= List of teams and cyclists in the 1986 Tour de France =

List of cyclists

The number of riders per nation participated in the 1986 Tour de France: 20+ / 10–19 / 2–9 / 1

The 1986 Tour de France was the 73rd edition of Tour de France, one of cycling's Grand Tours. The Tour began in Boulogne-Billancourt on 4 July and finished on the Champs-Élysées in Paris on 23 July.

In June, 23 teams had requested to start in the 1986 Tour. The Tour direction accepted 21 applications, so a total of 21 teams participated in the 1986 Tour de France. The two teams whose application was denied were Skala-Skil and Miko. Each team sent a squad of ten riders, which meant that the race would start with a peloton of 210 cyclists, a record setting total. From the 210 riders that began this edition, 132 made it to the finish in Paris.

7-Eleven became the Tour's first team from the United States, with a squad consisting of eight Americans, one Canadian and one Mexican. Jim Ochowicz, 7-Eleven's founder and manager, met with the Amaury Sport Organisation (ASO) and persuaded them to invite his team. In the Spring, the team withdrew from competition in Europe (missing the opportunity to become the first American team in the history of the Vuelta a España) due to the United States conflict with Libya, losing out on much needed competitive racing unavailable in the United States.

== Teams ==
- La Vie Claire
- Carrera Jeans–Vagabond
- Kas
- Panasonic–Merckx–Agu
- Système U
- PDM–Ultima–Concorde
- Café de Colombia–Varta
- Reynolds
- Peugeot–Shell
- Kwantum–Decosol–Yoko
- Joker–Emerxil–Merckx
- Hitachi–Robland
- Zor–BH
- Fagor
- RMO–Cycles Méral–Mavic
- Postobón–Manzana–Ryalcao
- Seat–Orbea
- Gis Gelati
- Teka
- Malvor–Bottecchia–Sidi
- 7-Eleven

== Cyclists ==
Legend
| No. | Starting number worn by the rider during the Tour |
| Pos. | Position in the general classification |
| Time | Deficit to the winner of the general classification |
| General classification | Denotes the winner of the general classification |
| Points classification | Denotes the winner of the points classification |
| Mountains classification | Denotes the winner of the mountains classification |
| Young rider classification | Denotes the winner of the Young Cyclist under 25 classification |
| Intermediate Sprint classification | Denotes the winner of the intermediate sprints classification |
| Combination classification | Denotes the winner of the combination classification |
| Team classification | Denotes the winner of the team classification |
| Combativity award | Denotes the winner of the combativity award |
| DNF | Denotes a rider who did not finish |
| NP | Denotes a rider who was a non-participant |
| AB | Denotes a rider who abandoned |
| HD | Denotes a rider who was outside the time limit (French: Hors Delai) |
Age correct as of 4 July 1986, the date on which the Tour began

=== By starting number ===
| No. | Name | Nationality | Team | Age | Pos. | Time | Ref |
|---|---|---|---|---|---|---|---|
| 1 | Bernard Hinault | France | La Vie Claire | 31 | 2 | + 3' 10" | |
| 2 | Steve Bauer | Canada | La Vie Claire | 27 | 23 | + 56' 02" | |
| 3 | Charly Bérard | France | La Vie Claire | 30 | 44 | + 1h 29' 02" | |
| 4 | Jean-François Bernard | France | La Vie Claire | 24 | 12 | + 35' 45" | |
| 5 | Andrew Hampsten | United States | La Vie Claire | 24 | 4 | + 18' 44" | |
| 6 | Philippe Leleu | France | La Vie Claire | 28 | 97 | + 2h 07' 03" | |
| 7 | Greg LeMond | United States | La Vie Claire | 25 | 1 | 110h 35' 19" | |
| 8 | Niki Rüttimann | Switzerland | La Vie Claire | 23 | 7 | + 30' 52" | |
| 9 | Alain Vigneron | France | La Vie Claire | 31 | 95 | + 2h 05' 08" | |
| 10 | Guido Winterberg | Switzerland | La Vie Claire | 23 | 127 | + 2h 27' 26" | |
| 11 | Stephen Roche | Ireland | Carrera Jeans–Vagabond | 26 | 48 | + 1h 32' 30" | |
| 12 | Guido Bontempi | Italy | Carrera Jeans–Vagabond | 26 | 92 | + 2h 03' 39" | |
| 13 | Beat Breu | Switzerland | Carrera Jeans–Vagabond | 28 | 74 | + 1h 51' 54" | |
| 14 | Davide Cassani | Italy | Carrera Jeans–Vagabond | 25 | DNF (NP-20) | — | |
| 15 | Bruno Leali | Italy | Carrera Jeans–Vagabond | 28 | 73 | + 1h 51' 49" | |
| 16 | Erich Maechler | Switzerland | Carrera Jeans–Vagabond | 25 | 49 | + 1h 32' 45" | |
| 17 | Jørgen Pedersen | Denmark | Carrera Jeans–Vagabond | 26 | 77 | + 1h 54' 32" | |
| 18 | Francesco Rossignoli | Italy | Carrera Jeans–Vagabond | 23 | 109 | + 2h 13' 56" | |
| 19 | Eddy Schepers | Belgium | Carrera Jeans–Vagabond | 30 | 37 | + 1h 18' 20" | |
| 20 | Urs Zimmermann | Switzerland | Carrera Jeans–Vagabond | 26 | 3 | + 10' 54" | |
| 21 | Jörg Müller | Switzerland | Kas | 25 | 99 | + 2h 07' 46" | |
| 22 | Patrice Esnault | France | Kas | 25 | DNF (HD-6) | — | |
| 23 | Dominique Garde | France | Kas | 27 | 45 | + 1h 29' 11" | |
| 24 | Jean-Claude Garde | France | Kas | 25 | 57 | + 1h 40' 57" | |
| 25 | Iñaki Gastón | Spain | Kas | 23 | 75 | + 1h 52' 35" | |
| 26 | Éric Guyot | France | Kas | 24 | DNF (AB-14) | — | |
| 27 | Jean-Claude Leclercq | France | Kas | 23 | 56 | + 1h 40' 43" | |
| 28 | Joël Pelier | France | Kas | 24 | DNF (NP-18) | — | |
| 29 | Jean-Luc Vandenbroucke | France | Kas | 31 | 119 | + 2h 17' 58" | |
| 30 | Frédéric Vichot | France | Kas | 27 | 100 | + 2h 08' 15" | |
| 31 | Robert Millar | Great Britain | Panasonic–Merckx–Agu | 27 | DNF (AB-21) | — | |
| 32 | Phil Anderson | Australia | Panasonic–Merckx–Agu | 28 | 39 | + 1h 19' 41" | |
| 33 | Jos Lammertink | Netherlands | Panasonic–Merckx–Agu | 28 | DNF (AB-4) | — | |
| 34 | Henk Lubberding | Netherlands | Panasonic–Merckx–Agu | 32 | DNF (NP-13) | — | |
| 35 | Guy Nulens | Belgium | Panasonic–Merckx–Agu | 28 | 54 | + 1h 39' 08" | |
| 36 | Eddy Planckaert | Belgium | Panasonic–Merckx–Agu | 27 | DNF (AB-12) | — | |
| 37 | Eric Vanderaerden | Belgium | Panasonic–Merckx–Agu | 24 | 125 | + 2h 22' 30" | |
| 38 | Johan van der Velde | Netherlands | Panasonic–Merckx–Agu | 29 | 52 | + 1h 37' 55" | |
| 39 | Eric Van Lancker | Belgium | Panasonic–Merckx–Agu | 25 | 89 | + 2h 01' 53" | |
| 40 | Peter Winnen | Netherlands | Panasonic–Merckx–Agu | 28 | DNF (AB-21) | — | |
| 41 | Laurent Fignon | France | Système U | 25 | DNF (NP-13) | — | |
| 42 | Laurent Biondi | France | Système U | 26 | DNF (AB-16) | — | |
| 43 | Alain Bondue | France | Système U | 27 | 124 | + 2h 22' 03" | |
| 44 | Éric Boyer | France | Système U | 22 | 98 | + 2h 07' 27" | |
| 45 | Dominique Gaigne | France | Système U | 25 | 85 | + 1h 59' 27" | |
| 46 | Bernard Gavillet | Switzerland | Système U | 26 | 28 | + 1h 08' 17" | |
| 47 | Christophe Lavainne | France | Système U | 22 | 88 | + 2h 01' 00" | |
| 48 | Yvon Madiot | France | Système U | 24 | 10 | + 33' 27" | |
| 49 | Thierry Marie | France | Système U | 23 | 108 | + 2h 13' 24" | |
| 50 | Charly Mottet | France | Système U | 23 | 16 | + 45' 58" | |
| 51 | Pedro Delgado | Spain | PDM–Ultima–Concorde | 26 | DNF (AB-18) | — | |
| 52 | Wim Arras | Belgium | PDM–Ultima–Concorde | 22 | DNF (HD-2) | — | |
| 53 | Henk Boeve | Netherlands | PDM–Ultima–Concorde | 28 | DNF (AB-16) | — | |
| 54 | Gerrie Knetemann | Netherlands | PDM–Ultima–Concorde | 35 | 84 | + 1h 58' 28" | |
| 55 | Steven Rooks | Netherlands | PDM–Ultima–Concorde | 25 | 9 | + 33' 22" | |
| 56 | Jan Simoens | Netherlands | PDM–Ultima–Concorde | 22 | DNF (HD-2) | — | |
| 57 | Peter Stevenhaagen | Netherlands | PDM–Ultima–Concorde | 21 | 29 | + 1h 10' 40" | |
| 58 | Marc van Orsouw | Netherlands | PDM–Ultima–Concorde | 22 | DNF (HD-2) | — | |
| 59 | Jan van Wijk | Netherlands | PDM–Ultima–Concorde | 24 | 90 | + 2h 02' 35" | |
| 60 | Gerard Veldscholten | Netherlands | PDM–Ultima–Concorde | 26 | 61 | + 1h 42' 57" | |
| 61 | Luis Herrera | Colombia | Café de Colombia–Varta | 25 | 22 | + 56' 00" | |
| 62 | Rafaël Antonio Acevedo | Colombia | Café de Colombia–Varta | 32 | DNF (HD-2) | — | |
| 63 | Edgar Corredor | Colombia | Café de Colombia–Varta | 26 | DNF (HD-18) | — | |
| 64 | Alfonso Flórez Ortiz | Colombia | Café de Colombia–Varta | 33 | 27 | + 1h 05' 54" | |
| 65 | José Patrocinio Jiménez | Colombia | Café de Colombia–Varta | 33 | 21 | + 55' 42" | |
| 66 | Marco-Antonio Leon | Colombia | Café de Colombia–Varta | 23 | 86 | + 2h 00' 49" | |
| 67 | Jose-Alfonso Lopez Lemus | Colombia | Café de Colombia–Varta | 34 | DNF (HD-2) | — | |
| 68 | Fabio Parra | Colombia | Café de Colombia–Varta | 26 | DNF (AB-4) | — | |
| 69 | Abelardo Rondón | Colombia | Café de Colombia–Varta | 22 | DNF (HD-2) | — | |
| 70 | Pedro Soler | Colombia | Café de Colombia–Varta | 25 | DNF (HD-2) | — | |
| 71 | José Luis Laguía | Spain | Reynolds | 26 | 121 | + 2h 19' 48" | |
| 72 | Dominique Arnaud | France | Reynolds | 30 | 76 | + 1h 53' 54" | |
| 73 | Samuel Cabrera | Colombia | Reynolds | 25 | 11 | + 35' 28" | |
| 74 | Marc Gomez | France | Reynolds | 31 | 123 | + 2h 21' 13" | |
| 75 | Julián Gorospe | Spain | Reynolds | 26 | 79 | + 1h 56' 11" | |
| 76 | Anastasio Greciano | Spain | Reynolds | 34 | DNF (AB-15) | — | |
| 77 | Carlos Hernández Bailo | Spain | Reynolds | 27 | 53 | + 1h 38' 13" | |
| 78 | Jesús Hernández Úbeda | Spain | Reynolds | 26 | 117 | + 2h 17' 26" | |
| 79 | Miguel Induráin | Spain | Reynolds | 21 | DNF (AB-12) | — | |
| 80 | Celestino Prieto | Spain | Reynolds | 25 | DNF (NP-15) | — | |
| 81 | Pascal Simon | France | Peugeot–Shell | 29 | 13 | + 37' 44" | |
| 82 | Frédéric Brun | France | Peugeot–Shell | 28 | 107 | + 2h 13' 11" | |
| 83 | Bruno Cornillet | France | Peugeot–Shell | 23 | DNF (HD-18) | — | |
| 84 | Gilbert Duclos-Lassalle | France | Peugeot–Shell | 31 | DNF (AB-12) | — | |
| 85 | Robert Forest | France | Peugeot–Shell | 24 | 35 | + 1h 16' 19" | |
| 86 | Gilbert Glaus | Switzerland | Peugeot–Shell | 30 | DNF (AB-15) | — | |
| 87 | Dag Otto Lauritzen | Norway | Peugeot–Shell | 29 | 34 | + 1h 15' 47" | |
| 88 | Éric Louvel | France | Peugeot–Shell | 24 | 111 | + 2h 14' 41" | |
| 89 | Ronan Pensec | France | Peugeot–Shell | 22 | 6 | + 25' 59" | |
| 90 | Sean Yates | Great Britain | Peugeot–Shell | 26 | 112 | + 2h 15' 20" | |
| 91 | Joop Zoetemelk | Netherlands | Kwantum–Decosol–Yoko | 39 | 24 | + 57' 04" | |
| 92 | Maarten Ducrot | Netherlands | Kwantum–Decosol–Yoko | 28 | 81 | + 1h 58' 02" | |
| 93 | Nico Emonds | Belgium | Kwantum–Decosol–Yoko | 25 | 70 | + 1h 49' 19" | |
| 94 | Jelle Nijdam | Netherlands | Kwantum–Decosol–Yoko | 22 | DNF (HD-6) | — | |
| 95 | Ludo Peeters | Belgium | Kwantum–Decosol–Yoko | 32 | 69 | + 1h 49' 11" | |
| 96 | Twan Poels | Netherlands | Kwantum–Decosol–Yoko | 22 | 65 | + 1h 44' 17" | |
| 97 | Cees Priem | Netherlands | Kwantum–Decosol–Yoko | 35 | DNF (AB-12) | — | |
| 98 | Luc Roosen | Belgium | Kwantum–Decosol–Yoko | 21 | 103 | + 2h 10' 46" | |
| 99 | Gerrit Solleveld | Netherlands | Kwantum–Decosol–Yoko | 25 | 101 | + 2h 09' 00" | |
| 100 | Adri van der Poel | Netherlands | Kwantum–Decosol–Yoko | 27 | 110 | + 2h 14' 20" | |
| 101 | Marc Sergeant | Belgium | Joker–Emerxil–Merckx | 26 | DNF (AB-17) | — | |
| 102 | Carlo Bomans | Belgium | Joker–Emerxil–Merckx | 23 | DNF (AB-17) | — | |
| 103 | Michel Dernies | Belgium | Joker–Emerxil–Merckx | 25 | 113 | + 2h 15' 29" | |
| 104 | Paul Haghedooren | Belgium | Joker–Emerxil–Merckx | 26 | 67 | + 1h 47' 59" | |
| 105 | Jozef Lieckens | Belgium | Joker–Emerxil–Merckx | 27 | 129 | + 2h 29' 21" | |
| 106 | André Lurquin | Belgium | Joker–Emerxil–Merckx | 24 | DNF (HD-2) | — | |
| 107 | Eric McKenzie | New Zealand | Joker–Emerxil–Merckx | 27 | DNF (AB-18) | — | |
| 108 | Jan Nevens | Belgium | Joker–Emerxil–Merckx | 27 | 51 | + 1h 37' 15" | |
| 109 | Wim Van Eynde | Belgium | Joker–Emerxil–Merckx | 25 | 102 | + 2h 10' 46" | |
| 110 | Ronny Van Holen | Belgium | Joker–Emerxil–Merckx | 27 | DNF (AB-16) | — | |
| 111 | Claude Criquielion | Belgium | Hitachi–Robland | 29 | 5 | + 24' 36" | |
| 112 | Philippe Delaurier | France | Hitachi–Robland | 25 | DNF (HD-13) | — | |
| 113 | Hendrik Devos | Belgium | Hitachi–Robland | 30 | 43 | + 1h 24' 43" | |
| 114 | Dirk De Wolf | Belgium | Hitachi–Robland | 25 | 64 | + 1h 44' 17" | |
| 115 | Rudy Dhaenens | Belgium | Hitachi–Robland | 25 | 122 | + 2h 19' 58" | |
| 116 | Jos Haex | Belgium | Hitachi–Robland | 26 | 78 | + 1h 54' 38" | |
| 117 | Stefan Morjean | Belgium | Hitachi–Robland | 26 | DNF (HD-16) | — | |
| 118 | Rudy Rogiers | Belgium | Hitachi–Robland | 25 | 104 | + 2h 11' 09" | |
| 119 | Jean-Philippe Vandenbrande | Belgium | Hitachi–Robland | 30 | 58 | + 1h 41' 23" | |
| 120 | Jan Wijnants | Belgium | Hitachi–Robland | 27 | 105 | + 2h 11' 14" | |
| 121 | Álvaro Pino | Spain | Zor–BH | 29 | 8 | + 33' 00" | |
| 122 | Francisco Antequera | Spain | Zor–BH | 22 | 94 | + 2h 05' 08" | |
| 123 | Philippe Bouvatier | France | Zor–BH | 22 | DNF (AB-15) | — | |
| 124 | Ángel Camarillo Llorens | Spain | Zor–BH | 27 | DNF (HD-18) | — | |
| 125 | Juan Fernández Martín | Spain | Zor–BH | 29 | DNF (AB-17) | — | |
| 126 | Anselmo Fuerte | Spain | Zor–BH | 24 | 31 | + 1h 12' 13" | |
| 127 | Francisco Rodríguez Maldonado | Colombia | Zor–BH | 26 | DNF (HD-3) | — | |
| 128 | Jesús Rodríguez Magro | Spain | Zor–BH | 26 | 40 | + 1h 20' 09" | |
| 129 | Juan-Carlos Rozas Salgado | Spain | Zor–BH | 23 | 59 | + 1h 41' 51" | |
| 130 | Guido Van Calster | Belgium | Zor–BH | 30 | 72 | + 1h 50' 42" | |
| 131 | Éric Caritoux | France | Fagor | 25 | 20 | + 52' 39" | |
| 132 | Jean-Claude Bagot | France | Fagor | 28 | 19 | + 51' 38" | |
| 133 | Jean-René Bernaudeau | France | Fagor | 29 | 26 | + 1h 03' 56" | |
| 134 | Argemiro Bohórquez | Colombia | Fagor | 26 | DNF (AB-17) | — | |
| 135 | Martin Earley | Ireland | Fagor | 24 | 46 | + 1h 30' 30" | |
| 136 | Frank Hoste | Belgium | Fagor | 30 | 116 | + 2h 17' 06" | |
| 137 | François Lemarchand | France | Fagor | 25 | 68 | + 1h 49' 05" | |
| 138 | Pedro Muñoz Machín Rodríguez | Spain | Fagor | 27 | DNF (AB-5) | — | |
| 139 | Martín Ramírez | Colombia | Fagor | 25 | 42 | + 1h 22' 26" | |
| 140 | Pol Verschuere | Belgium | Fagor | 31 | DNF (AB-14) | — | |
| 141 | Thierry Claveyrolat | France | RMO–Cycles Méral–Mavic | 27 | 17 | + 46' 00" | |
| 142 | Vincent Barteau | France | RMO–Cycles Méral–Mavic | 24 | DNF (HD-2) | — | |
| 143 | Francis Castaing | France | RMO–Cycles Méral–Mavic | 27 | 130 | + 2h 41' 56" | |
| 144 | André Chappuis | France | RMO–Cycles Méral–Mavic | 30 | 118 | + 2h 17' 36" | |
| 145 | Jean-Louis Gauthier | France | RMO–Cycles Méral–Mavic | 30 | DNF (AB-12) | — | |
| 146 | Bruno Huger | France | RMO–Cycles Méral–Mavic | 23 | DNF (AB-12) | — | |
| 147 | Paul Kimmage | Ireland | RMO–Cycles Méral–Mavic | 24 | 131 | + 2h 44' 06" | |
| 148 | Gilles Mas | France | RMO–Cycles Méral–Mavic | 25 | 47 | + 1h 31' 56" | |
| 149 | Régis Simon | France | RMO–Cycles Méral–Mavic | 28 | 93 | + 2h 05' 06" | |
| 150 | Bernard Vallet | France | RMO–Cycles Méral–Mavic | 32 | 62 | + 1h 43' 12" | |
| 151 | Omar Hernández | Colombia | Postobón–Manzana–Ryalcao | 24 | DNF (AB-12) | — | |
| 152 | Raul Acosta Arias | Colombia | Postobón–Manzana–Ryalcao | 24 | DNF (HD-2) | — | |
| 153 | Israel Corredor | Colombia | Postobón–Manzana–Ryalcao | 26 | 106 | + 2h 12' 04" | |
| 154 | Carlos Jaramillo | Colombia | Postobón–Manzana–Ryalcao | 25 | 55 | + 1h 39' 48" | |
| 155 | Sergio Jaramillo | Colombia | Postobón–Manzana–Ryalcao | 28 | DNF (HD-2) | — | |
| 156 | Antonio Londoño | Colombia | Postobón–Manzana–Ryalcao | 31 | DNF (AB-12) | — | |
| 157 | Gerardo Moncada | Colombia | Postobón–Manzana–Ryalcao | 23 | DNF (AB-12) | — | |
| 158 | Reynel Montoya | Colombia | Postobón–Manzana–Ryalcao | 26 | 15 | + 45' 36" | |
| 159 | Néstor Mora | Colombia | Postobón–Manzana–Ryalcao | 22 | 83 | + 1h 58' 26" | |
| 160 | Heriberto Uran | Colombia | Postobón–Manzana–Ryalcao | 31 | 50 | + 1h 36' 35" | |
| 161 | Marino Lejarreta | Spain | Seat–Orbea | 29 | 18 | + 49' 09" | |
| 162 | Antonio Esparza | Spain | Seat–Orbea | 24 | 126 | + 2h 22' 45" | |
| 163 | Mathieu Hermans | Netherlands | Seat–Orbea | 23 | DNF (AB-17) | — | |
| 164 | Pascal Jules | France | Seat–Orbea | 24 | DNF (HD-2) | — | |
| 165 | Jokin Mújika | Spain | Seat–Orbea | 23 | 30 | + 1h 11' 01" | |
| 166 | Erwin Nijboer | Netherlands | Seat–Orbea | 22 | DNF (AB-18) | — | |
| 167 | Vicente Ridaura | Spain | Seat–Orbea | 22 | 87 | + 2h 00' 59" | |
| 168 | Pello Ruiz Cabestany | Spain | Seat–Orbea | 24 | 36 | + 1h 16' 22" | |
| 169 | José Salvador Sanchis | Spain | Seat–Orbea | 23 | DNF (HD-18) | — | |
| 170 | Jaime Vilamajó | Spain | Seat–Orbea | 26 | 115 | + 2h 16' 41" | |
| 171 | Silvano Contini | Italy | Gis Gelati | 28 | 41 | + 1h 22' 18" | |
| 172 | Marco Giovannetti | Italy | Gis Gelati | 24 | DNF (AB-12) | — | |
| 173 | Walter Magnago | Italy | Gis Gelati | 25 | DNF (AB-12) | — | |
| 174 | Palmiro Masciarelli | Italy | Gis Gelati | 33 | DNF (AB-16) | — | |
| 175 | Giuseppe Petito | Italy | Gis Gelati | 26 | DNF (AB-13) | — | |
| 176 | Marino Polini | Italy | Gis Gelati | 27 | DNF (AB-17) | — | |
| 177 | Alessandro Pozzi | Italy | Gis Gelati | 31 | 91 | + 2h 03' 39" | |
| 178 | Ennio Salvador | Italy | Gis Gelati | 25 | 132 | + 2h 55' 51" | |
| 179 | Graziano Salvietti | Italy | Gis Gelati | 30 | DNF (AB-13) | — | |
| 180 | Ennio Vanotti | Italy | Gis Gelati | 30 | 66 | + 1h 45' 20" | |
| 181 | Reimund Dietzen | West Germany | Teka | 27 | DNF (AB-13) | — | |
| 182 | José Antonio Agudelo Gómez | Colombia | Teka | 26 | 33 | + 1h 15' 13" | |
| 183 | Enrique Alberto Aja Cagigas | Spain | Teka | 26 | 60 | + 1h 42' 32" | |
| 184 | Guillermo Arenas | Spain | Teka | 23 | DNF (AB-13) | — | |
| 185 | Jesús Blanco Villar | Spain | Teka | 23 | 25 | + 1h 03' 16" | |
| 186 | Manuel Cárdenas Espitia | Colombia | Teka | 25 | 71 | + 1h 50' 11" | |
| 187 | Eduardo Chozas | Spain | Teka | 25 | 14 | + 38' 48" | |
| 188 | Federico Echave | Spain | Teka | 25 | 38 | + 1h 18' 53" | |
| 189 | Alfonso Gutiérrez | Spain | Teka | 24 | DNF (AB-13) | — | |
| 190 | Ángel Sarrapio | Spain | Teka | 27 | DNF (AB-13) | — | |
| 191 | Mario Beccia | Italy | Malvor–Bottecchia–Sidi | 30 | DNF (AB-12) | — | |
| 192 | Stefano Allocchio | Italy | Malvor–Bottecchia–Sidi | 24 | DNF (AB-13) | — | |
| 193 | Pierangelo Bincoletto | Italy | Malvor–Bottecchia–Sidi | 27 | 128 | + 2h 27' 28" | |
| 194 | Primož Čerin | Yugoslavia | Malvor–Bottecchia–Sidi | 24 | 32 | + 1h 14' 40" | |
| 195 | Acácio da Silva | Portugal | Malvor–Bottecchia–Sidi | 25 | 82 | + 1h 58' 05" | |
| 196 | Robert Dill-Bundi | Switzerland | Malvor–Bottecchia–Sidi | 27 | DNF (AB-12) | — | |
| 197 | Renan Ferraro | Brazil | Malvor–Bottecchia–Sidi | 24 | DNF (HD-6) | — | |
| 198 | Luigi Furlan | Italy | Malvor–Bottecchia–Sidi | 23 | DNF (AB-17) | — | |
| 199 | Roberto Pagnin | Italy | Malvor–Bottecchia–Sidi | 23 | DNF (AB-12) | — | |
| 200 | Renato Piccolo | Italy | Malvor–Bottecchia–Sidi | 23 | DNF (AB-12) | — | |
| 201 | Alexi Grewal | United States | 7-Eleven | 25 | DNF (AB-17) | — | |
| 202 | Raúl Alcalá | Mexico | 7-Eleven | 22 | 114 | + 2h 15' 53" | |
| 203 | Chris Carmichael | United States | 7-Eleven | 24 | DNF (AB-12) | — | |
| 204 | Eric Heiden | United States | 7-Eleven | 28 | DNF (AB-18) | — | |
| 205 | Ron Kiefel | United States | 7-Eleven | 26 | 96 | + 2h 06' 38" | |
| 206 | Davis Phinney | United States | 7-Eleven | 26 | DNF (AB-15) | — | |
| 207 | Jeff Pierce | United States | 7-Eleven | 27 | 80 | + 1h 56' 57" | |
| 208 | Bob Roll | United States | 7-Eleven | 25 | 63 | + 1h 43' 26" | |
| 209 | Doug Shapiro | United States | 7-Eleven | 26 | DNF (AB-12) | — | |
| 210 | Alex Stieda | Canada | 7-Eleven | 25 | 120 | + 2h 19' 47" | |

=== By team ===
La Vie Claire
| No. | Rider | Pos. |
|---|---|---|
| 1 | Bernard Hinault (FRA) | 2 |
| 2 | Steve Bauer (CAN) | 23 |
| 3 | Charly Bérard (FRA) | 44 |
| 4 | Jean-François Bernard (FRA) | 12 |
| 5 | Andrew Hampsten (USA) | 4 |
| 6 | Philippe Leleu (FRA) | 97 |
| 7 | Greg LeMond (USA) | 1 |
| 8 | Niki Rüttimann (SUI) | 7 |
| 9 | Alain Vigneron (FRA) | 95 |
| 10 | Guido Winterberg (SUI) | 127 |
Directeur sportif: Paul Köchli

Carrera Jeans–Vagabond
| No. | Rider | Pos. |
|---|---|---|
| 11 | Stephen Roche (IRL) | 48 |
| 12 | Guido Bontempi (ITA) | 92 |
| 13 | Beat Breu (SUI) | 74 |
| 14 | Davide Cassani (ITA) | NP-20 |
| 15 | Bruno Leali (ITA) | 73 |
| 16 | Erich Maechler (SUI) | 49 |
| 17 | Jørgen Pedersen (DEN) | 77 |
| 18 | Francesco Rossignoli (ITA) | 109 |
| 19 | Eddy Schepers (BEL) | 37 |
| 20 | Urs Zimmermann (SUI) | 3 |
Directeur sportif: Davide Boifava

Kas
| No. | Rider | Pos. |
|---|---|---|
| 21 | Jörg Müller (SUI) | 99 |
| 22 | Patrice Esnault (FRA) | HD-6 |
| 23 | Dominique Garde (FRA) | 45 |
| 24 | Jean-Claude Garde (FRA) | 57 |
| 25 | Iñaki Gastón (ESP) | 75 |
| 26 | Éric Guyot (FRA) | AB-14 |
| 27 | Jean-Claude Leclercq (FRA) | 56 |
| 28 | Joël Pelier (FRA) | NP-18 |
| 29 | Jean-Luc Vandenbroucke (FRA) | 119 |
| 30 | Frédéric Vichot (FRA) | 100 |
Directeur sportif: Jean de Gribaldy

Panasonic–Merckx–Agu
| No. | Rider | Pos. |
|---|---|---|
| 31 | Robert Millar (GBR) | AB-21 |
| 32 | Phil Anderson (AUS) | 39 |
| 33 | Jos Lammertink (NED) | AB-4 |
| 34 | Henk Lubberding (NED) | NP-13 |
| 35 | Guy Nulens (BEL) | 54 |
| 36 | Eddy Planckaert (BEL) | AB-12 |
| 37 | Eric Vanderaerden (BEL) | 125 |
| 38 | Johan van der Velde (NED) | 52 |
| 39 | Eric Van Lancker (BEL) | 89 |
| 40 | Peter Winnen (NED) | AB-21 |
Directeur sportif: Peter Post

Système U
| No. | Rider | Pos. |
|---|---|---|
| 41 | Laurent Fignon (FRA) | NP-13 |
| 42 | Laurent Biondi (FRA) | AB-16 |
| 43 | Alain Bondue (FRA) | 124 |
| 44 | Éric Boyer (FRA) | 98 |
| 45 | Dominique Gaigne (FRA) | 85 |
| 46 | Bernard Gavillet (SUI) | 28 |
| 47 | Christophe Lavainne (FRA) | 88 |
| 48 | Yvon Madiot (FRA) | 10 |
| 49 | Thierry Marie (FRA) | 108 |
| 50 | Charly Mottet (FRA) | 16 |
Directeur sportif: Cyrille Guimard

PDM–Ultima–Concorde
| No. | Rider | Pos. |
|---|---|---|
| 51 | Pedro Delgado (ESP) | AB-18 |
| 52 | Wim Arras (BEL) | HD-2 |
| 53 | Henk Boeve (NED) | AB-16 |
| 54 | Gerrie Knetemann (NED) | 84 |
| 55 | Steven Rooks (NED) | 9 |
| 56 | Jan Simoens (NED) | HD-2 |
| 57 | Peter Stevenhaagen (NED) | 29 |
| 58 | Marc van Orsouw (NED) | HD-2 |
| 59 | Jan van Wijk (NED) | 90 |
| 60 | Gerard Veldscholten (NED) | 61 |
Directeur sportif: Jan Gijsbers

Café de Colombia–Varta
| No. | Rider | Pos. |
|---|---|---|
| 61 | Luis Herrera (COL) | 22 |
| 62 | Rafaël Antonio Acevedo (COL) | HD-2 |
| 63 | Edgar Corredor (COL) | HD-18 |
| 64 | Alfonso Flórez Ortiz (COL) | 27 |
| 65 | José Patrocinio Jiménez (COL) | 21 |
| 66 | Marco-Antonio Leon (COL) | 86 |
| 67 | Jose-Alfonso Lopez Lemus (COL) | HD-2 |
| 68 | Fabio Parra (COL) | AB-4 |
| 69 | Abelardo Rondón (COL) | HD-2 |
| 70 | Pedro Soler (COL) | HD-2 |
Directeur sportif: Raphaël Géminiani

Reynolds
| No. | Rider | Pos. |
|---|---|---|
| 71 | José Luis Laguía (ESP) | 121 |
| 72 | Dominique Arnaud (FRA) | 76 |
| 73 | Samuel Cabrera (COL) | 11 |
| 74 | Marc Gomez (FRA) | 123 |
| 75 | Julián Gorospe (ESP) | 79 |
| 76 | Anastasio Greciano (ESP) | AB-15 |
| 77 | Carlos Hernández Bailo (ESP) | 53 |
| 78 | Jesús Hernández Úbeda (ESP) | 117 |
| 79 | Miguel Induráin (ESP) | AB-12 |
| 80 | Celestino Prieto (ESP) | NP-15 |
Directeur sportif: José Miguel Echavarri

Peugeot–Shell
| No. | Rider | Pos. |
|---|---|---|
| 81 | Pascal Simon (FRA) | 13 |
| 82 | Frédéric Brun (FRA) | 107 |
| 83 | Bruno Cornillet (FRA) | HD-18 |
| 84 | Gilbert Duclos-Lassalle (FRA) | AB-12 |
| 85 | Robert Forest (FRA) | 35 |
| 86 | Gilbert Glaus (SUI) | AB-15 |
| 87 | Dag Otto Lauritzen (NOR) | 34 |
| 88 | Éric Louvel (FRA) | 111 |
| 89 | Ronan Pensec (FRA) | 6 |
| 90 | Sean Yates (GBR) | 112 |
Directeur sportif: Roger Legeay

Kwantum–Decosol–Yoko
| No. | Rider | Pos. |
|---|---|---|
| 91 | Joop Zoetemelk (NED) | 24 |
| 92 | Maarten Ducrot (NED) | 81 |
| 93 | Nico Emonds (BEL) | 70 |
| 94 | Jelle Nijdam (NED) | HD-6 |
| 95 | Ludo Peeters (BEL) | 69 |
| 96 | Twan Poels (NED) | 65 |
| 97 | Cees Priem (NED) | AB-12 |
| 98 | Luc Roosen (BEL) | 103 |
| 99 | Gerrit Solleveld (NED) | 101 |
| 100 | Adri van der Poel (NED) | 110 |
Directeur sportif: Jan Raas

Joker–Emerxil–Merckx
| No. | Rider | Pos. |
|---|---|---|
| 101 | Marc Sergeant (BEL) | AB-17 |
| 102 | Carlo Bomans (BEL) | AB-17 |
| 103 | Michel Dernies (BEL) | 113 |
| 104 | Paul Haghedooren (BEL) | 67 |
| 105 | Jozef Lieckens (BEL) | 129 |
| 106 | André Lurquin (BEL) | HD-2 |
| 107 | Eric McKenzie (NZL) | AB-18 |
| 108 | Jan Nevens (BEL) | 51 |
| 109 | Wim Van Eynde (BEL) | 102 |
| 110 | Ronny Van Holen (BEL) | AB-16 |
Directeur sportif: Patrick Lefevere

Hitachi–Robland
| No. | Rider | Pos. |
|---|---|---|
| 111 | Claude Criquielion (BEL) | 5 |
| 112 | Philippe Delaurier (FRA) | HD-13 |
| 113 | Hendrik Devos (BEL) | 43 |
| 114 | Dirk De Wolf (BEL) | 64 |
| 115 | Rudy Dhaenens (BEL) | 122 |
| 116 | Jos Haex (BEL) | 78 |
| 117 | Stefan Morjean (BEL) | HD-16 |
| 118 | Rudy Rogiers (BEL) | 104 |
| 119 | Jean-Philippe Vandenbrande (BEL) | 58 |
| 120 | Jan Wijnants (BEL) | 105 |
Directeur sportif: Albert De Kimpe

Zor–BH
| No. | Rider | Pos. |
|---|---|---|
| 121 | Álvaro Pino (ESP) | 8 |
| 122 | Francisco Antequera (ESP) | 94 |
| 123 | Philippe Bouvatier (FRA) | AB-15 |
| 124 | Ángel Camarillo Llorens (ESP) | HD-18 |
| 125 | Juan Fernández Martín (ESP) | AB-17 |
| 126 | Anselmo Fuerte (ESP) | 31 |
| 127 | Francisco Rodríguez Maldonado (COL) | HD-3 |
| 128 | Jesús Rodríguez Magro (ESP) | 40 |
| 129 | Juan-Carlos Rozas Salgado (ESP) | 59 |
| 130 | Guido Van Calster (BEL) | 72 |
Directeur sportif: Javier Mínguez

Fagor
| No. | Rider | Pos. |
|---|---|---|
| 131 | Éric Caritoux (FRA) | 20 |
| 132 | Jean-Claude Bagot (FRA) | 19 |
| 133 | Jean-René Bernaudeau (FRA) | 26 |
| 134 | Argemiro Bohórquez (COL) | AB-17 |
| 135 | Martin Earley (IRL) | 46 |
| 136 | Frank Hoste (BEL) | 116 |
| 137 | François Lemarchand (FRA) | 68 |
| 138 | Pedro Muñoz Machín Rodríguez (ESP) | AB-5 |
| 139 | Martín Ramírez (COL) | 42 |
| 140 | Pol Verschuere (BEL) | AB-14 |
Directeur sportif: Miguel Gómez

RMO–Cycles Méral–Mavic
| No. | Rider | Pos. |
|---|---|---|
| 141 | Thierry Claveyrolat (FRA) | 17 |
| 142 | Vincent Barteau (FRA) | HD-2 |
| 143 | Francis Castaing (FRA) | 130 |
| 144 | André Chappuis (FRA) | 118 |
| 145 | Jean-Louis Gauthier (FRA) | AB-12 |
| 146 | Bruno Huger (FRA) | AB-12 |
| 147 | Paul Kimmage (IRL) | 131 |
| 148 | Gilles Mas (FRA) | 47 |
| 149 | Régis Simon (FRA) | 93 |
| 150 | Bernard Vallet (FRA) | 62 |
Directeur sportif: Bernard Thévenet

Postobón–Manzana–Ryalcao
| No. | Rider | Pos. |
|---|---|---|
| 151 | Omar Hernández (COL) | AB-12 |
| 152 | Raul Acosta Arias (COL) | HD-2 |
| 153 | Israel Corredor (COL) | 106 |
| 154 | Carlos Jaramillo (COL) | 55 |
| 155 | Sergio Jaramillo (COL) | HD-2 |
| 156 | Antonio Londoño (COL) | AB-12 |
| 157 | Gerardo Moncada (COL) | AB-12 |
| 158 | Reynel Montoya (COL) | 15 |
| 159 | Néstor Mora (COL) | 83 |
| 160 | Heriberto Uran (COL) | 50 |
Directeur sportif: José Raúl Meza Orozco

Seat–Orbea
| No. | Rider | Pos. |
|---|---|---|
| 161 | Marino Lejarreta (ESP) | 18 |
| 162 | Antonio Esparza (ESP) | 126 |
| 163 | Mathieu Hermans (NED) | AB-17 |
| 164 | Pascal Jules (FRA) | HD-2 |
| 165 | Jokin Mújika (ESP) | 30 |
| 166 | Erwin Nijboer (NED) | AB-18 |
| 167 | Vicente Ridaura (ESP) | 87 |
| 168 | Pello Ruiz Cabestany (ESP) | 36 |
| 169 | José Salvador Sanchis (ESP) | HD-18 |
| 170 | Jaime Vilamajó (ESP) | 115 |
Directeur sportif: Domingo Perurena

Gis Gelati
| No. | Rider | Pos. |
|---|---|---|
| 171 | Silvano Contini (ITA) | 41 |
| 172 | Marco Giovannetti (ITA) | AB-12 |
| 173 | Walter Magnago (ITA) | AB-12 |
| 174 | Palmiro Masciarelli (ITA) | AB-16 |
| 175 | Giuseppe Petito (ITA) | AB-13 |
| 176 | Marino Polini (ITA) | AB-17 |
| 177 | Alessandro Pozzi (ITA) | 91 |
| 178 | Ennio Salvador (ITA) | 132 |
| 179 | Graziano Salvietti (ITA) | AB-13 |
| 180 | Ennio Vanotti (ITA) | 66 |
Directeur sportif: Luciano Pezzi

Teka
| No. | Rider | Pos. |
|---|---|---|
| 181 | Reimund Dietzen (FRG) | AB-13 |
| 182 | José Antonio Agudelo Gómez (COL) | 33 |
| 183 | Enrique Alberto Aja Cagigas (ESP) | 60 |
| 184 | Guillermo Arenas (ESP) | AB-13 |
| 185 | Jesús Blanco Villar (ESP) | 25 |
| 186 | Manuel Cárdenas Espitia (COL) | 71 |
| 187 | Eduardo Chozas (ESP) | 14 |
| 188 | Federico Echave (ESP) | 38 |
| 189 | Alfonso Gutiérrez (ESP) | AB-13 |
| 190 | Ángel Sarrapio (ESP) | AB-13 |
Directeur sportif: José António González Linares

Malvor–Bottecchia–Sidi
| No. | Rider | Pos. |
|---|---|---|
| 191 | Mario Beccia (ITA) | AB-12 |
| 192 | Stefano Allocchio (ITA) | AB-13 |
| 193 | Pierangelo Bincoletto (ITA) | 128 |
| 194 | Primož Čerin (YUG) | 32 |
| 195 | Acácio da Silva (POR) | 82 |
| 196 | Robert Dill-Bundi (SUI) | AB-12 |
| 197 | Renan Ferraro (BRA) | HD-6 |
| 198 | Luigi Furlan (ITA) | AB-17 |
| 199 | Roberto Pagnin (ITA) | AB-12 |
| 200 | Renato Piccolo (ITA) | AB-12 |
Directeur sportif: Dino Zandegù

7-Eleven
| No. | Rider | Pos. |
|---|---|---|
| 201 | Alexi Grewal (USA) | AB-17 |
| 202 | Raúl Alcalá (MEX) | 114 |
| 203 | Chris Carmichael (USA) | AB-12 |
| 204 | Eric Heiden (USA) | AB-18 |
| 205 | Ron Kiefel (USA) | 96 |
| 206 | Davis Phinney (USA) | AB-15 |
| 207 | Jeff Pierce (USA) | 80 |
| 208 | Bob Roll (USA) | 63 |
| 209 | Doug Shapiro (USA) | AB-12 |
| 210 | Alex Stieda (CAN) | 120 |
Directeur sportif: Jim Ochowicz

=== By nationality ===
The 210 riders that competed in the 1986 Tour de France were represented by 20 different countries.

| Country | No. of riders | Finishers | Stage wins |
|---|---|---|---|
| Australia | 1 | 1 | |
| Belgium | 30 | 22 | 5 (Pol Verschuere, Ludo Peeters, Eddy Planckaert, Rudy Dhaenens, Frank Hoste) |
| Brazil | 1 | 0 | |
| Canada | 2 | 2 | |
| Colombia | 26 | 13 | |
| Denmark | 1 | 1 | |
| France | 47 | 34 | 5 (Thierry Marie, Bernard Hinault ×3, Jean-François Bernard) |
| Great Britain | 2 | 1 | |
| Ireland | 3 | 3 | |
| Italy | 21 | 8 | 3 (Guido Bontempi ×3) |
| Mexico | 1 | 1 | |
| Netherlands | 21 | 11 | 1 (Johan van der Velde) |
| New Zealand | 1 | 0 | |
| Norway | 1 | 1 | |
| Portugal | 1 | 1 | |
| Spain | 31 | 20 | 5 (Pello Ruiz Cabestany, José Ángel Sarrapio, Pedro Delgado, Eduardo Chozas, Julián Gorospe) |
| Switzerland | 9 | 7 | 2 (Niki Rüttimann, Erich Maechler) |
| United States | 10 | 5 | 2 (Davis Phinney, Greg LeMond) |
| Yugoslavia | 1 | 1 | |
| West Germany | 1 | 0 | |
| Total | 210 | 132 | 23 (Note: The team time trial on stage 2, won by Système U, is not counted in this total.) |
