= 1986 Tour de France, Stage 12 to Stage 23 =

Stages of cycle race

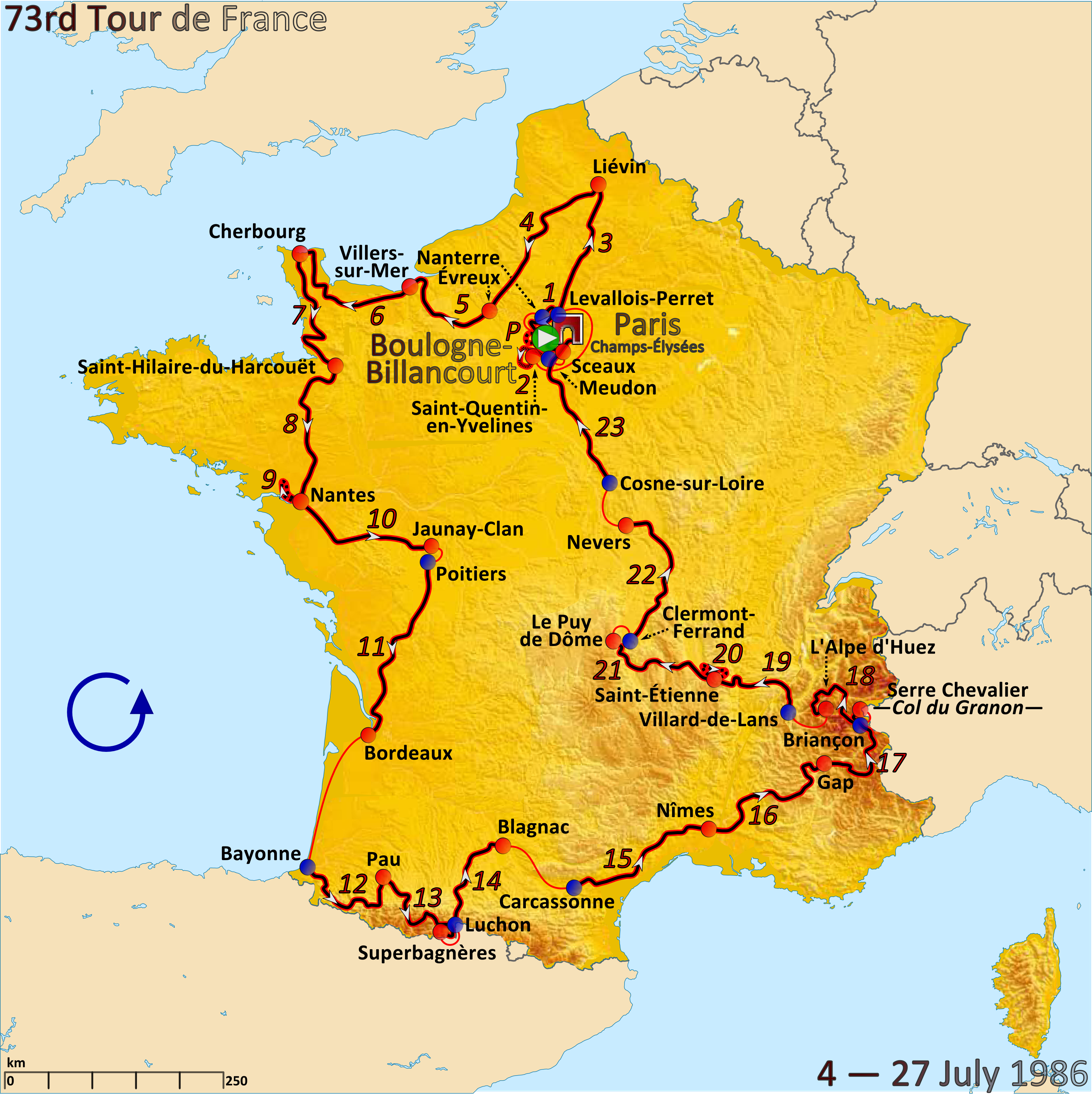
Route of the 1986 Tour de France

The 1986 Tour de France was the 73rd edition of Tour de France, one of cycling's Grand Tours. The Tour began in Boulogne-Billancourt with a prologue individual time trial on 4 July and Stage 12 occurred on 15 July with a mountainous stage from Bayonne. The race finished on the Champs-Élysées in Paris on 27 July.

== Stage 12 ==
15 July 1986 — Bayonne to Pau, 217.5 km (135.1 mi)

This mountainous stage departed from Bayonne heading south through Villefranque and then south-east to Hasparren. With the race turning south to the Category 4 Côte de Mendionde and then south-east to the Category 4 Côte d'Hélette, the riders gently descended south through Irissarry and west to Ossès. The race then headed south to Saint-Jean-Pied-de-Port and turned east to Saint-Jean-le-Vieux. Continuing south-east through Ahaxe and Mendive, over the Category 1 Col de Burdincurutcheta to 1,135 metres (3,724 ft), and then east over the Category 2 Col Bagargui to 1,327 metres (4,354 ft), the riders partially descended to the brief ascent of the Category 3 Côte de Larrau at 600 metres (2,000 ft). After fully descending north-east through Licq and north to Tardets, the race headed east over the Category 4 Côte du Monument Lopez, continuing through Lanne-en-Barétous to Aramits. The riders then turned south to Lourdios-Ichère, and east over the Category 2 Col d'Ichère to 680 metres (2,230 ft), descending to Sarrance. The route then continued north to Escot, before turning east for the Category 1 Col de Marie-Blanque to 1,035 metres (3,396 ft), descending to Bielle. The race then turned north to Sévignacq-Meyracq, continuing through Rebenacq and Gan, over the Category 4 climb of the Côte de Larroude to the finish line in Pau.

Stage 12 result

Rank	Rider	Team	Time
1	Pedro Delgado (ESP)	PDM–Ultima–Concorde	6h 03' 18"
2	Bernard Hinault (FRA)	La Vie Claire	+ 1"
3	Greg LeMond (USA)	La Vie Claire	+ 4' 37"
4	Luis Herrera (COL)	Café de Colombia–Varta	+ 4' 38"
5	Steve Bauer (CAN)	La Vie Claire	+ 5' 09"
6	Claude Criquielion (BEL)	Hitachi–Robland	+ 5' 31"
7	Steven Rooks (NED)	PDM–Ultima–Concorde	s.t.
8	Andrew Hampsten (USA)	La Vie Claire	s.t.
9	Peter Winnen (NED)	Panasonic–Merckx–Agu	+ 5' 32"
10	Urs Zimmermann (SUI)	Carrera Jeans–Vagabond	s.t.

General classification after stage 12

Rank	Rider	Team	Time
1	Bernard Hinault (FRA)	La Vie Claire	51h 36' 29"
2	Greg LeMond (USA)	La Vie Claire	+ 5' 25"
3	Urs Zimmermann (SUI)	Carrera Jeans–Vagabond	+ 6' 22"
4	Pedro Delgado (ESP)	PDM–Ultima–Concorde	+ 6' 57"
5	Robert Millar (GBR)	Panasonic–Merckx–Agu	+ 7' 03"
6	Jean-François Bernard (FRA)	La Vie Claire	+ 7' 47"
7	Steve Bauer (CAN)	La Vie Claire	+ 7' 49"
8	Yvon Madiot (FRA)	Système U	+ 8' 42"
9	Claude Criquielion (BEL)	Hitachi–Robland	+ 9' 55"
10	Peter Winnen (NED)	Panasonic–Merckx–Agu	+ 10' 36"

== Stage 13 ==
16 July 1986 — Pau to Superbagnères, 186 km (115.6 mi)

This mountainous stage departed from Pau and headed south-east through Aressy, Assat, Boeil-Bezing, Igon and Lestelle-Bétharram to Saint-Pé-de-Bigorre. The route then turned east through Peyrouse to Lourdes. After turning south-west to Agos-Vidalos and then south through Argelès-Gazost, Pierrefitte and Sassis to Luz-Saint-Sauveur, the riders began the climb through Barèges to the Hors catégorie Col du Tourmalet at 2,115 metres (6,939 ft). Descending east and then north through La Mongie to Sainte-Marie-de-Campan, the riders then turned south-east to begin the climb through La Séoube for the Category 1 Col d'Aspin to 1,489 metres (4,885 ft), with a descent to Arreau. The riders then began climbing south through Bordères-Louron, continuing south and then east to the Category 1 Col de Peyresourde at 1,570 metres (5,150 ft). The final descent was east through Garin to Luchon, before the Hors catégorie climb to the ski station of Superbagnères at 1,770 metres (5,810 ft).

Stage 13 result

Rank	Rider	Team	Time
1	Greg LeMond (USA)	La Vie Claire	6h 06' 37"
2	Robert Millar (GBR)	Panasonic–Merckx–Agu	+ 1' 12"
3	Urs Zimmermann (SUI)	Carrera Jeans–Vagabond	+ 1' 15"
4	Luis Herrera (COL)	Café de Colombia–Varta	+ 1' 51"
5	Andrew Hampsten (USA)	La Vie Claire	+ 2' 20"
6	Thierry Claveyrolat (FRA)	RMO–Cycles Méral–Mavic	+ 3' 43"
7	Steven Rooks (NED)	PDM–Ultima–Concorde	+ 3' 47"
8	Álvaro Pino (ESP)	Zor–BH	+ 3' 55"
9	Samuel Cabrera (COL)	Reynolds	+ 4' 05"
10	Pedro Delgado (ESP)	PDM–Ultima–Concorde	+ 4' 30"

General classification after stage 13

Rank	Rider	Team	Time
1	Bernard Hinault (FRA)	La Vie Claire	57h 47' 45"
2	Greg LeMond (USA)	La Vie Claire	+ 40"
3	Urs Zimmermann (SUI)	Carrera Jeans–Vagabond	+ 2' 58"
4	Robert Millar (GBR)	Panasonic–Merckx–Agu	+ 3' 32"
5	Pedro Delgado (ESP)	PDM–Ultima–Concorde	+ 6' 48"
6	Andrew Hampsten (USA)	La Vie Claire	+ 8' 26"
7	Luis Herrera (COL)	Café de Colombia–Varta	+ 9' 08"
8	Steven Rooks (NED)	PDM–Ultima–Concorde	+ 12' 58"
9	Claude Criquielion (BEL)	Hitachi–Robland	+ 13' 00"
10	Peter Winnen (NED)	Panasonic–Merckx–Agu	+ 15' 19"

== Stage 14 ==
17 July 1986 — Luchon to Blagnac, 154 km (95.7 mi)

This descending hilly stage departed from Luchon gently descending north through Cazaux-Layrisse and Cierp-Gaud to Martres-de-Rivière. The riders continued east to Saint-Gaudens and turned north over the Category 4 Côte de la Serre through Saint-Marcet and then over the Category 4 Côte de Saint-Patatin to Montgaillard. The riders then turned north-east to Anan and continued through L'Isle-en-Dodon to Lombez. The race then headed east, travelling through Bragayrac to Sainte-Foy-de-Peyrolières. Turning north-east again, the race continued through Saint-Lys and Fonsorbes to Plaisance-du-Touch. The route then turned north, travelling through Pibrac to Cornebarrieu. Finally, heading south-east around Toulouse–Blagnac Airport to the finish line at Blagnac.

Stage 14 result

Rank	Rider	Team	Time
1	Niki Rüttimann (SUI)	La Vie Claire	3h 47' 44"
2	Christophe Lavainne (FRA)	Système U	+ 32"
3	Twan Poels (NED)	Kwantum–Decosol–Yoko	s.t.
4	Paul Haghedooren (BEL)	Joker–Emerxil–Merckx	+ 33"
5	Hendrik Devos (BEL)	Hitachi–Robland	+ 7' 17"
6	Marino Polini (ITA)	Gis Gelati	s.t.
7	Eric Vanderaerden (BEL)	Panasonic–Merckx–Agu	+ 8' 02"
8	Carlo Bomans (BEL)	Joker–Emerxil–Merckx	s.t.
9	Jean-Philippe Vandenbrande (BEL)	Hitachi–Robland	s.t.
10	Guido Bontempi (ITA)	Carrera Jeans–Vagabond	s.t.

General classification after stage 14

Rank	Rider	Team	Time
1	Bernard Hinault (FRA)	La Vie Claire	61h 43' 31"
2	Greg LeMond (USA)	La Vie Claire	+ 34"
3	Urs Zimmermann (SUI)	Carrera Jeans–Vagabond	+ 2' 58"
4	Robert Millar (GBR)	Panasonic–Merckx–Agu	+ 3' 32"
5	Pedro Delgado (ESP)	PDM–Ultima–Concorde	+ 6' 48"
6	Andrew Hampsten (USA)	La Vie Claire	+ 8' 26"
7	Luis Herrera (COL)	Café de Colombia–Varta	+ 9' 08"
8	Steven Rooks (NED)	PDM–Ultima–Concorde	+ 12' 58"
9	Claude Criquielion (BEL)	Hitachi–Robland	+ 13' 00"
10	Peter Winnen (NED)	Panasonic–Merckx–Agu	+ 15' 19"

== Stage 15 ==
18 July 1986 — Carcassonne to Nîmes, 225.5 km (140.1 mi)

Stage 15 result

Rank	Rider	Team	Time
1	Frank Hoste (BEL)	Fagor	5h 52' 31"
2	Silvano Contini (ITA)	Gis Gelati	s.t.
3	Ronny Van Holen (BEL)	Joker–Emerxil–Merckx	+ 6"
4	Mathieu Hermans (NED)	Seat–Orbea	+ 8"
5	Acácio da Silva (POR)	Malvor–Bottecchia–Vaporella	s.t.
6	Thierry Marie (FRA)	Système U	s.t.
7	Carlo Bomans (BEL)	Joker–Emerxil–Merckx	s.t.
8	Eric Vanderaerden (BEL)	Panasonic–Merckx–Agu	s.t.
9	Federico Echave (ESP)	Teka	s.t.
10	Iñaki Gastón (ESP)	Kas	s.t.

General classification after stage 15

Rank	Rider	Team	Time
1	Bernard Hinault (FRA)	La Vie Claire	67h 38' 10"
2	Greg LeMond (USA)	La Vie Claire	+ 34"
3	Urs Zimmermann (SUI)	Carrera Jeans–Vagabond	+ 2' 58"
4	Robert Millar (GBR)	Panasonic–Merckx–Agu	+ 3' 32"
5	Pedro Delgado (ESP)	PDM–Ultima–Concorde	+ 7' 37"
6	Andrew Hampsten (USA)	La Vie Claire	+ 8' 26"
7	Luis Herrera (COL)	Café de Colombia–Varta	+ 9' 57"
8	Niki Rüttimann (SUI)	La Vie Claire	+ 10' 25"
9	Steven Rooks (NED)	PDM–Ultima–Concorde	+ 12' 58"
10	Claude Criquielion (BEL)	Hitachi–Robland	+ 13' 00"

== Stage 16 ==
19 July 1986 — Nîmes to Gap, 246.5 km (153.2 mi)

Stage 16 result

Rank	Rider	Team	Time
1	Jean-François Bernard (FRA)	La Vie Claire	7h 39' 54"
2	Jozef Lieckens (BEL)	Joker–Emerxil–Merckx	+ 3' 02"
3	Dominique Garde (FRA)	Kas	s.t.
4	Philippe Leleu (FRA)	La Vie Claire	s.t.
5	Jean-Claude Bagot (FRA)	Fagor	s.t.
6	Peter Winnen (NED)	Panasonic–Merckx–Agu	s.t.
7	Dominique Gaigne (FRA)	Système U	s.t.
8	Charly Bérard (FRA)	La Vie Claire	s.t.
9	Ronan Pensec (FRA)	Peugeot–Shell	s.t.
10	Bernard Vallet (FRA)	RMO–Cycles Méral–Mavic	s.t.

General classification after stage 16

Rank	Rider	Team	Time
1	Bernard Hinault (FRA)	La Vie Claire	75h 24' 20"
2	Greg LeMond (USA)	La Vie Claire	+ 34"
3	Urs Zimmermann (SUI)	Carrera Jeans–Vagabond	+ 2' 58"
4	Robert Millar (GBR)	Panasonic–Merckx–Agu	+ 3' 32"
5	Pedro Delgado (ESP)	PDM–Ultima–Concorde	+ 7' 37"
6	Andrew Hampsten (USA)	La Vie Claire	+ 8' 26"
7	Luis Herrera (COL)	Café de Colombia–Varta	+ 9' 57"
8	Peter Winnen (NED)	Panasonic–Merckx–Agu	+ 10' 01"
9	Niki Rüttimann (SUI)	La Vie Claire	+ 10' 25"
10	Ronan Pensec (FRA)	Peugeot–Shell	+ 11' 58"

== Stage 17 ==
20 July 1986 — Gap to Serre Chevalier, 190 km (120 mi)

This mountainous stage departed from Gap heading east through La Bâtie-Neuve and Chorges, across the Lac de Serre-Ponçon to Savines-le-Lac. The riders then turned south-west over the Category 3 Côte des Demoiselles to Le Sauze and then south-east to Le Lauzet-Ubaye. The race continued east through Les Thuiles and Barcelonnette to Jausiers. Turning north, the riders travelled through La Condamine and Saint-Paul-sur-Ubaye, ascending the Category 1 Col de Vars to 2,108 m (6,916 ft), before descending through Saint Marie to Guillestre. Climbing north-east and then north through Arvieux, the riders then ascended the Hors catégorie Col d'Izoard to 2,361 m (7,746 ft) and descended through Cervières to Briançon. The final ascent was the Hors catégorie climb of the Col du Granon to 2,413 m (7,917 ft), for the finish line above Serre Chevalier.

Stage 17 result

Rank	Rider	Team	Time
1	Eduardo Chozas (ESP)	Teka	5h 52' 52"
2	Urs Zimmermann (SUI)	Carrera Jeans–Vagabond	+ 6' 26"
3	Greg LeMond (USA)	La Vie Claire	s.t.
4	Samuel Cabrera (COL)	Reynolds	+ 6' 35"
5	Pedro Delgado (ESP)	PDM–Ultima–Concorde	+ 7' 23"
6	Anselmo Fuerte (ESP)	Zor–BH	+ 8' 52"
7	Andrew Hampsten (USA)	La Vie Claire	+ 8' 53"
8	Claude Criquielion (BEL)	Hitachi–Robland	+ 9' 33"
9	Yvon Madiot (FRA)	Système U	+ 9' 35"
10	Charly Mottet (FRA)	Système U	+ 9' 39"

General classification after stage 17

Rank	Rider	Team	Time
1	Greg LeMond (USA)	La Vie Claire	81h 24' 12"
2	Urs Zimmermann (SUI)	Carrera Jeans–Vagabond	+ 2' 24"
3	Bernard Hinault (FRA)	La Vie Claire	+ 2' 47"
4	Robert Millar (GBR)	Panasonic–Merckx–Agu	+ 6' 19"
5	Pedro Delgado (ESP)	PDM–Ultima–Concorde	+ 8' 00"
6	Andrew Hampsten (USA)	La Vie Claire	+ 10' 20"
7	Ronan Pensec (FRA)	Peugeot–Shell	+ 15' 04"
8	Claude Criquielion (BEL)	Hitachi–Robland	+ 15' 33"
9	Niki Rüttimann (SUI)	La Vie Claire	+ 16' 29"
10	Steven Rooks (NED)	PDM–Ultima–Concorde	+ 17' 11"

== Stage 18 ==
21 July 1986 — Briançon to Alpe d'Huez, 162.5 km (101.0 mi)

This mountainous stage contained the ascent of the Hors catégorie Col du Galibier to 2,460 m (8,070 ft) descending to Saint-Jean-de-Maurienne, followed by the Category 1 climb of the Col de la Croix de Fer to 2,067 m (6,781 ft). After a descent into Le Bourg-d'Oisans, the final ascent was the Hors catégorie climb to the finish line at Alpe d'Huez at 1,860 m (6,100 ft).

Stage 18 result

Rank	Rider	Team	Time
1	Bernard Hinault (FRA)	La Vie Claire	5h 03' 03"
2	Greg LeMond (USA)	La Vie Claire	s.t.
3	Urs Zimmermann (SUI)	Carrera Jeans–Vagabond	+ 5' 15"
4	Reynel Montoya (COL)	Postobón–Manzana–Ryalcao	+ 6' 06"
5	Yvon Madiot (FRA)	Système U	+ 6' 21"
6	Andrew Hampsten (USA)	La Vie Claire	+ 6' 22"
7	Ronan Pensec (FRA)	Peugeot–Shell	+ 6' 26"
8	Samuel Cabrera (COL)	Reynolds	+ 6' 34"
9	Pascal Simon (FRA)	Peugeot–Shell	+ 6' 45"
10	Álvaro Pino (ESP)	Zor–BH	+ 6' 48"

General classification after stage 18

Rank	Rider	Team	Time
1	Greg LeMond (USA)	La Vie Claire	86h 27' 11"
2	Bernard Hinault (FRA)	La Vie Claire	+ 2' 45"
3	Urs Zimmermann (SUI)	Carrera Jeans–Vagabond	+ 7' 41"
4	Andrew Hampsten (USA)	La Vie Claire	+ 16' 46"
5	Ronan Pensec (FRA)	Peugeot–Shell	+ 21' 34"
6	Claude Criquielion (BEL)	Hitachi–Robland	+ 22' 27"
7	Niki Rüttimann (SUI)	La Vie Claire	+ 23' 37"
8	Robert Millar (GBR)	Panasonic–Merckx–Agu	+ 26' 00"
9	Steven Rooks (NED)	PDM–Ultima–Concorde	+ 26' 30"
10	Álvaro Pino (ESP)	Zor–BH	+ 27' 46"

22 July 1986 — Rest day

== Stage 19 ==
23 July 1986 — Villard-de-Lans to Saint-Étienne, 179.5 km (111.5 mi)

Stage 19 result

Rank	Rider	Team	Time
1	Julián Gorospe (ESP)	Reynolds	5h 06' 10"
2	Phil Anderson (AUS)	Panasonic–Merckx–Agu	+ 2' 04"
3	Dominique Garde (FRA)	Kas	+ 2' 12"
4	Wim Van Eynde (BEL)	Joker–Emerxil–Merckx	+ 2' 25"
5	Steve Bauer (CAN)	La Vie Claire	+ 2' 26"
6	Bernard Hinault (FRA)	La Vie Claire	+ 2' 27"
7	Guido Van Calster (BEL)	Zor–BH	s.t.
8	Greg LeMond (USA)	La Vie Claire	s.t.
9	Peter Stevenhaagen (NED)	PDM–Ultima–Concorde	s.t.
10	Federico Echave (ESP)	Teka	s.t.

General classification after stage 19

Rank	Rider	Team	Time
1	Greg LeMond (USA)	La Vie Claire	91h 35' 48"
2	Bernard Hinault (FRA)	La Vie Claire	+ 2' 43"
3	Urs Zimmermann (SUI)	Carrera Jeans–Vagabond	+ 7' 41"
4	Andrew Hampsten (USA)	La Vie Claire	+ 16' 46"
5	Ronan Pensec (FRA)	Peugeot–Shell	+ 21' 32"
6	Claude Criquielion (BEL)	Hitachi–Robland	+ 22' 15"
7	Niki Rüttimann (SUI)	La Vie Claire	+ 23' 37"
8	Steven Rooks (NED)	PDM–Ultima–Concorde	+ 26' 30"
9	Álvaro Pino (ESP)	Zor–BH	+ 27' 46"
10	Samuel Cabrera (COL)	Reynolds	+ 28' 32"

== Stage 20 ==
24 July 1986 — Saint-Étienne to Saint-Étienne, 58 km (36 mi) (ITT)

Stage 20 result

Rank	Rider	Team	Time
1	Bernard Hinault (FRA)	La Vie Claire	1h 15' 36"
2	Greg LeMond (USA)	La Vie Claire	+ 25"
3	Julián Gorospe (ESP)	Reynolds	+ 2' 01"
4	Jean-François Bernard (FRA)	La Vie Claire	+ 2' 05"
5	Marino Lejarreta (ESP)	Seat–Orbea	+ 2' 31"
6	Jean-Luc Vandenbroucke (FRA)	Kas	+ 2' 35"
7	Peter Stevenhaagen (NED)	PDM–Ultima–Concorde	+ 2' 56"
8	Urs Zimmermann (SUI)	Carrera Jeans–Vagabond	+ 2' 59"
9	Claude Criquielion (BEL)	Hitachi–Robland	+ 3' 03"
10	Andrew Hampsten (USA)	La Vie Claire	+ 3' 12"

General classification after stage 20

Rank	Rider	Team	Time
1	Greg LeMond (USA)	La Vie Claire	92h 51' 49"
2	Bernard Hinault (FRA)	La Vie Claire	+ 2' 18"
3	Urs Zimmermann (SUI)	Carrera Jeans–Vagabond	+ 10' 15"
4	Andrew Hampsten (USA)	La Vie Claire	+ 19' 33"
5	Claude Criquielion (BEL)	Hitachi–Robland	+ 24' 53"
6	Ronan Pensec (FRA)	Peugeot–Shell	+ 25' 31"
7	Niki Rüttimann (SUI)	La Vie Claire	+ 28' 17"
8	Álvaro Pino (ESP)	Zor–BH	+ 32' 32"
9	Steven Rooks (NED)	PDM–Ultima–Concorde	+ 33' 32"
10	Yvon Madiot (FRA)	Système U	+ 34' 05"

== Stage 21 ==
25 July 1986 — Saint-Étienne to Puy de Dôme, 190 km (120 mi)

Stage 21 result

Rank	Rider	Team	Time
1	Erich Maechler (SUI)	Carrera Jeans–Vagabond	5h 32' 40"
2	Ludo Peeters (BEL)	Kwantum–Decosol–Yoko	+ 34"
3	Guido Van Calster (BEL)	Zor–BH	+ 56"
4	Martin Earley (FRA)	Fagor	+ 1' 22"
5	Hendrik Devos (BEL)	Hitachi–Robland	+ 1' 55"
6	Charly Mottet (FRA)	Système U	+ 2' 08"
7	Martín Ramírez (COL)	Fagor	+ 4' 08"
8	Andrew Hampsten (USA)	La Vie Claire	+ 5' 17"
9	Yvon Madiot (FRA)	Système U	+ 5' 22"
10	Reynel Montoya (COL)	Postobón–Manzana–Ryalcao	+ 5' 37"

General classification after stage 21

Rank	Rider	Team	Time
1	Greg LeMond (USA)	La Vie Claire	98h 30' 29"
2	Bernard Hinault (FRA)	La Vie Claire	+ 3' 10"
3	Urs Zimmermann (SUI)	Carrera Jeans–Vagabond	+ 10' 54"
4	Andrew Hampsten (USA)	La Vie Claire	+ 18' 50"
5	Claude Criquielion (BEL)	Hitachi–Robland	+ 24' 36"
6	Ronan Pensec (FRA)	Peugeot–Shell	+ 25' 59"
7	Niki Rüttimann (SUI)	La Vie Claire	+ 30' 52"
8	Álvaro Pino (ESP)	Zor–BH	+ 33' 00"
9	Steven Rooks (NED)	PDM–Ultima–Concorde	+ 33' 24"
10	Yvon Madiot (FRA)	Système U	+ 33' 27"

== Stage 22 ==
26 July 1986 — Clermont-Ferrand to Nevers, 194 km (121 mi)

Stage 22 result

Rank	Rider	Team	Time
1	Guido Bontempi (ITA)	Carrera Jeans–Vagabond	5h 12' 55"
2	Frank Hoste (BEL)	Fagor	s.t.
3	Eric Vanderaerden (BEL)	Panasonic–Merckx–Agu	s.t.
4	Adri van der Poel (NED)	Kwantum–Decosol–Yoko	s.t.
5	Guido Van Calster (BEL)	Zor–BH	s.t.
6	Jozef Lieckens (BEL)	Joker–Emerxil–Merckx	s.t.
7	Jean-Philippe Vandenbrande (BEL)	Hitachi–Robland	s.t.
8	Bernard Hinault (FRA)	La Vie Claire	s.t.
9	Peter Stevenhaagen (NED)	PDM–Ultima–Concorde	s.t.
10	Steve Bauer (CAN)	La Vie Claire	s.t.

General classification after stage 22

Rank	Rider	Team	Time
1	Greg LeMond (USA)	La Vie Claire	103h 43' 24"
2	Bernard Hinault (FRA)	La Vie Claire	+ 3' 10"
3	Urs Zimmermann (SUI)	Carrera Jeans–Vagabond	+ 10' 54"
4	Andrew Hampsten (USA)	La Vie Claire	+ 18' 44"
5	Claude Criquielion (BEL)	Hitachi–Robland	+ 24' 36"
6	Ronan Pensec (FRA)	Peugeot–Shell	+ 25' 59"
7	Niki Rüttimann (SUI)	La Vie Claire	+ 30' 52"
8	Álvaro Pino (ESP)	Zor–BH	+ 33' 00"
9	Steven Rooks (NED)	PDM–Ultima–Concorde	+ 33' 24"
10	Yvon Madiot (FRA)	Système U	+ 33' 27"

== Stage 23 ==
27 July 1986 — Cosne-sur-Loire to Paris, 255 km (158 mi)

Stage 23 result

Rank	Rider	Team	Time
1	Guido Bontempi (ITA)	Carrera Jeans–Vagabond	6h 51' 55"
2	Jozef Lieckens (BEL)	Joker–Emerxil–Merckx	s.t.
3	Eric Vanderaerden (BEL)	Panasonic–Merckx–Agu	s.t.
4	Bernard Hinault (FRA)	La Vie Claire	s.t.
5	Frank Hoste (BEL)	Fagor	s.t.
6	Steve Bauer (CAN)	La Vie Claire	s.t.
7	Régis Simon (FRA)	RMO–Cycles Méral–Mavic	s.t.
8	Nico Emonds (BEL)	Kwantum–Decosol–Yoko	s.t.
9	Guido Van Calster (BEL)	Zor–BH	s.t.
10	Francis Castaing (FRA)	RMO–Cycles Méral–Mavic	s.t.

General classification after stage 23

Rank	Rider	Team	Time
1	Greg LeMond (USA)	La Vie Claire	110h 35' 19"
2	Bernard Hinault (FRA)	La Vie Claire	+ 3' 10"
3	Urs Zimmermann (SUI)	Carrera Jeans–Vagabond	+ 10' 54"
4	Andrew Hampsten (USA)	La Vie Claire	+ 18' 44"
5	Claude Criquielion (BEL)	Hitachi–Robland	+ 24' 36"
6	Ronan Pensec (FRA)	Peugeot–Shell	+ 25' 59"
7	Niki Rüttimann (SUI)	La Vie Claire	+ 30' 52"
8	Álvaro Pino (ESP)	Zor–BH	+ 33' 00"
9	Steven Rooks (NED)	PDM–Ultima–Concorde	+ 33' 22"
10	Yvon Madiot (FRA)	Système U	+ 33' 27"
