= 1986 Tour de France, Prologue to Stage 11 =

Cycling race stages

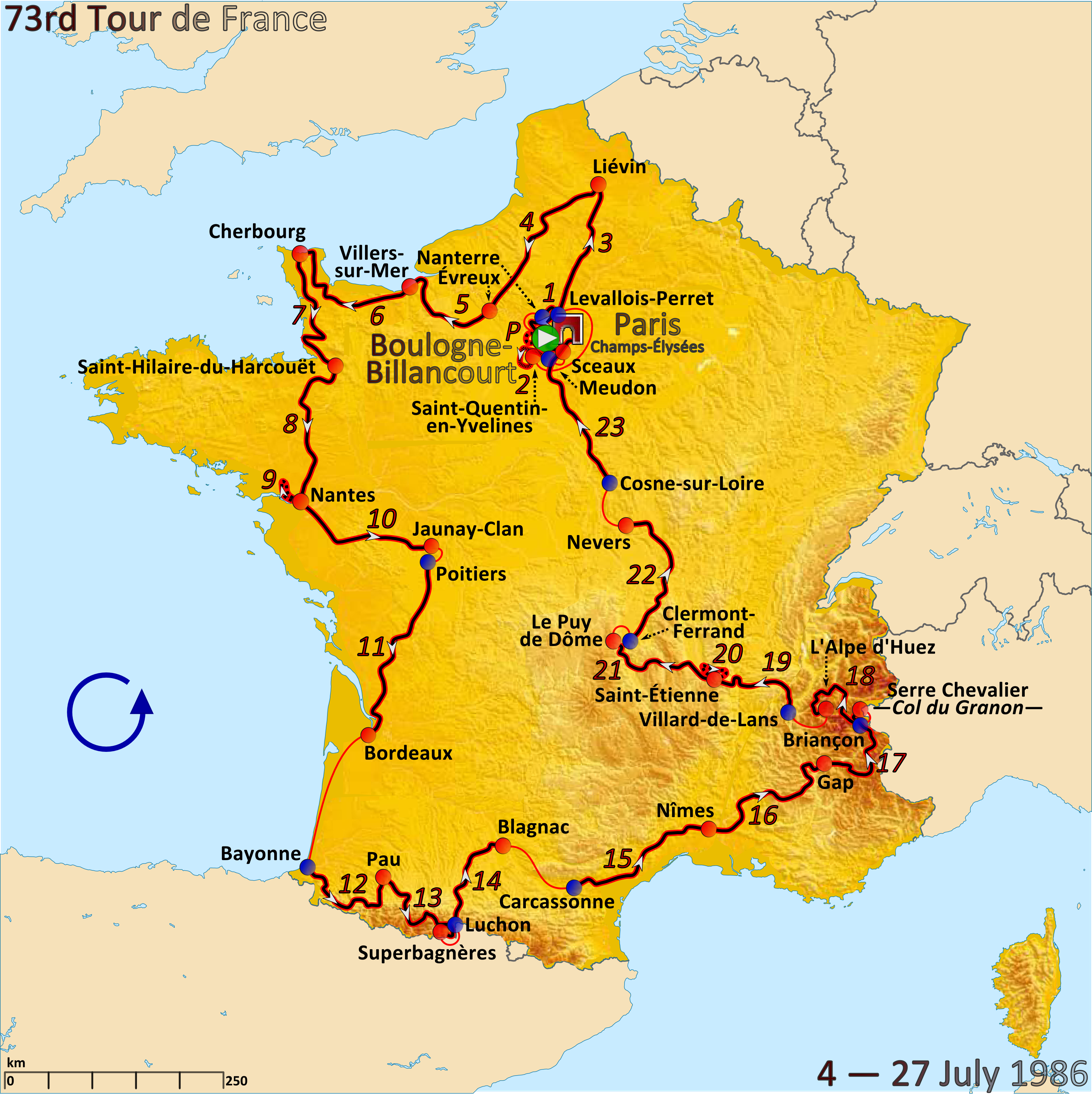
Route of the 1986 Tour de France

The 1986 Tour de France was the 73rd edition of Tour de France, one of cycling's Grand Tours. The Tour began in Boulogne-Billancourt with a prologue individual time trial on 4 July and Stage 11 occurred on 14 July with a flat stage to Bordeaux. The race finished on the Champs-Élysées in Paris on 27 July.

== Prologue ==
4 July 1986 — Boulogne-Billancourt, 4.6 km (2.9 mi) (ITT)

Prologue result and general classification after prologue

Rank	Rider	Team	Time
1	Thierry Marie (FRA)	Système U	5' 21"
2	Eric Vanderaerden (BEL)	Panasonic–Merckx–Agu	s.t.
3	Bernard Hinault (FRA)	La Vie Claire	+ 2"
4	Jean-Luc Vandenbroucke (BEL)	Kas	+ 3"
5	Jelle Nijdam (NED)	Kwantum–Decosol–Yoko	s.t.
6	Dominique Gaigne (FRA)	Système U	s.t.
7	Laurent Fignon (FRA)	Système U	+ 4"
8	Greg LeMond (USA)	La Vie Claire	s.t.
9	Erich Maechler (SUI)	Carrera Jeans–Vagabond	+ 5"
10	Jesús Blanco Villar (ESP)	Teka	s.t.

== Stage 1 ==
5 July 1986 — Nanterre to Sceaux, 85 km (52.8 mi)

Stage 1 result

Rank	Rider	Team	Time
1	Pol Verschuere (BEL)	Fagor	1h 58' 33"
2	Michel Dernies (BEL)	Joker–Emerxil–Merckx	+ 2"
3	Gerrit Solleveld (NED)	Kwantum–Decosol–Yoko	+ 3"
4	Phil Anderson (AUS)	Panasonic–Merckx–Agu	+ 9"
5	Alex Stieda (CAN)	7-Eleven	s.t.
6	Éric Guyot (FRA)	Kas	s.t.
7	Wim Arras (BEL)	PDM–Ultima–Concorde	+ 11"
8	Eddy Planckaert (BEL)	Panasonic–Merckx–Agu	s.t.
9	Eric McKenzie (NZL)	Joker–Emerxil–Merckx	s.t.
10	Joël Pelier (FRA)	Kas	s.t.

General classification after stage 1

Rank	Rider	Team	Time
1	Alex Stieda (CAN)	7-Eleven	2h 03' 39"
2	Eric Vanderaerden (BEL)	Panasonic–Merckx–Agu	+ 8"
3	Steve Bauer (CAN)	La Vie Claire	+ 22"
4	Thierry Marie (FRA)	Système U	+ 26"
5	Gerrit Solleveld (NED)	Kwantum–Decosol–Yoko	+ 3"
6	Bernard Hinault (FRA)	La Vie Claire	+ 28"
7	Jean-Luc Vandenbroucke (BEL)	Kas	+ 29"
8	Jelle Nijdam (NED)	Kwantum–Decosol–Yoko	s.t.
9	Dominique Gaigne (FRA)	Système U	s.t.
10	Laurent Fignon (FRA)	Système U	+ 30"

== Stage 2 ==
5 July 1986 — Meudon to Saint-Quentin-en-Yvelines, 56 km (34.8 mi) (TTT)

Stage 2 result

Rank	Team	Time
1	Système U	1h 10' 27"
2	Carrera Jeans–Vagabond	+ 38"
3	Panasonic–Merckx–Agu	+ 1' 02"
4	Kas	+ 1' 42"
5	La Vie Claire	+ 1' 55"
6	Peugeot–Shell	+ 2' 04"
7	Hitachi–Robland	+ 2' 17"
8	Gis Gelati	+ 2' 58"
9	Kwantum–Decosol–Yoko	+ 3' 19"
10	PDM–Ultima–Concorde	+ 3' 33"

General classification after stage 2

Rank	Rider	Team	Time
1	Thierry Marie (FRA)	Système U	3h 14' 32"
2	Dominique Gaigne (FRA)	Système U	+ 3"
3	Laurent Fignon (FRA)	Système U	+ 4"
4	Alain Bondue (FRA)	Système U	+ 7"
5	Yvon Madiot (FRA)	Système U	+ 17"
6	Charly Mottet (FRA)	Système U	s.t.
7	Éric Boyer (FRA)	Système U	+ 20"
8	Jelle Nijdam (NED)	Kwantum–Decosol–Yoko	s.t.
9	Erich Maechler (SUI)	Carrera Jeans–Vagabond	+ 43"
10	Stephen Roche (IRL)	Carrera Jeans–Vagabond	+ 48"

== Stage 3 ==
6 July 1986 — Levallois-Perret to Liévin, 214 km (133 mi)

Stage 3 result

Rank	Rider	Team	Time
1	Davis Phinney (USA)	7-Eleven	5h 45' 31"
2	Henk Boeve (NED)	PDM–Ultima–Concorde	s.t.
3	Robert Dill-Bundi (SUI)	Malvor–Bottecchia–Sidi	s.t.
4	Charly Mottet (FRA)	Système U	s.t.
5	Wim Van Eynde (BEL)	Joker–Emerxil–Merckx	s.t.
6	Dag Otto Lauritzen (NOR)	Peugeot–Shell	s.t.
7	Jean-Claude Garde (FRA)	Kas	s.t.
8	Laurent Biondi (FRA)	Système U	+ 3"
9	François Lemarchand (FRA)	Fagor	s.t.
10	Eric Vanderaerden (BEL)	Panasonic–Merckx–Agu	+ 5"

General classification after stage 3

Rank	Rider	Team	Time
1	Thierry Marie (FRA)	Système U	9h 00' 08"
2	Charly Mottet (FRA)	Système U	s.t.
3	Dominique Gaigne (FRA)	Système U	+ 3"
4	Laurent Fignon (FRA)	Système U	+ 4"
5	Alain Bondue (FRA)	Système U	+ 7"
6	Yvon Madiot (FRA)	Système U	+ 17"
7	Éric Boyer (FRA)	Système U	+ 20"
8	Erich Maechler (SUI)	Carrera Jeans–Vagabond	+ 43"
9	Eric Vanderaerden (BEL)	Panasonic–Merckx–Agu	+ 44"
10	Stephen Roche (IRL)	Carrera Jeans–Vagabond	+ 48"

== Stage 4 ==
7 July 1986 — Liévin to Évreux, 243 km (151 mi)

Stage 4 result

Rank	Rider	Team	Time
1	Pello Ruiz Cabestany (ESP)	Seat–Orbea	6h 57' 05"
2	Eric Vanderaerden (BEL)	Panasonic–Merckx–Agu	+ 2"
3	Mathieu Hermans (NED)	Seat–Orbea	s.t.
4	Jozef Lieckens (BEL)	Joker–Emerxil–Merckx	s.t.
5	Frank Hoste (BEL)	Fagor	s.t.
6	Jean-Philippe Vandenbrande (BEL)	Hitachi–Robland	s.t.
7	Jörg Müller (SUI)	Kas	s.t.
8	Marc Gomez (FRA)	Reynolds	s.t.
9	Francesco Rossignoli (ITA)	Carrera Jeans–Vagabond	s.t.
10	Peter Stevenhaagen (NED)	PDM–Ultima–Concorde	s.t.

General classification after stage 4

Rank	Rider	Team	Time
1	Dominique Gaigne (FRA)	Système U	15h 57' 06"
2	Thierry Marie (FRA)	Système U	+ 6"
3	Charly Mottet (FRA)	Système U	+ 9"
4	Laurent Fignon (FRA)	Système U	+ 13"
5	Yvon Madiot (FRA)	Système U	+ 26"
6	Éric Boyer (FRA)	Système U	+ 29"
7	Erich Maechler (SUI)	Carrera Jeans–Vagabond	+ 52"
8	Eric Vanderaerden (BEL)	Panasonic–Merckx–Agu	+ 53"
9	Stephen Roche (IRL)	Carrera Jeans–Vagabond	+ 57"
10	Bruno Leali (ITA)	Carrera Jeans–Vagabond	+ 1' 02"

== Stage 5 ==
8 July 1986 — Évreux to Villers-sur-Mer, 124 km (77 mi)

Stage 5 result

Rank	Rider	Team	Time
1	Johan van der Velde (NED)	Panasonic–Merckx–Agu	3h 04' 05"
2	Joël Pelier (FRA)	Kas	+ 2"
3	Eddy Planckaert (BEL)	Panasonic–Merckx–Agu	+ 39"
4	Miguel Induráin (ESP)	Reynolds	+ 40"
5	Alfonso Gutiérrez (ESP)	Teka	+ 1' 15"
6	Eric Vanderaerden (BEL)	Panasonic–Merckx–Agu	s.t.
7	Jozef Lieckens (BEL)	Joker–Emerxil–Merckx	s.t.
8	Mathieu Hermans (NED)	Seat–Orbea	s.t.
9	Eric McKenzie (NZL)	Joker–Emerxil–Merckx	s.t.
10	Guido Bontempi (ITA)	Carrera Jeans–Vagabond	s.t.

General classification after stage 5

Rank	Rider	Team	Time
1	Johan van der Velde (NED)	Panasonic–Merckx–Agu	19h 01' 50"
2	Dominique Gaigne (FRA)	Système U	+ 36"
3	Thierry Marie (FRA)	Système U	+ 42"
4	Charly Mottet (FRA)	Système U	+ 45"
5	Laurent Fignon (FRA)	Système U	+ 49"
6	Joël Pelier (FRA)	Kas	+ 56"
7	Yvon Madiot (FRA)	Système U	+ 1' 02"
8	Éric Boyer (FRA)	Système U	+ 1' 05"
9	Erich Maechler (SUI)	Carrera Jeans–Vagabond	+ 1' 28"
10	Eric Vanderaerden (BEL)	Panasonic–Merckx–Agu	+ 1' 29"

== Stage 6 ==
9 July 1986 — Villers-sur-Mer to Cherbourg, 200 km (120 mi)

Stage 6 result

Rank	Rider	Team	Time
1	Guido Bontempi (ITA)	Carrera Jeans–Vagabond	4h 47' 01"
2	Roberto Pagnin (ITA)	Malvor–Bottecchia–Vaporella	+ 2"
3	Jean-René Bernaudeau (BEL)	Fagor	s.t.
4	Marc Sergeant (BEL)	Joker–Emerxil–Merckx	s.t.
5	Jean-Claude Garde (FRA)	Kas	+ 12"
6	Jozef Lieckens (BEL)	Joker–Emerxil–Merckx	+ 56"
7	Eric Vanderaerden (BEL)	Panasonic–Merckx–Agu	s.t.
8	Mathieu Hermans (NED)	Seat–Orbea	s.t.
9	Peter Stevenhaagen (NED)	PDM–Ultima–Concorde	s.t.
10	Francis Castaing (FRA)	RMO–Cycles Méral–Mavic	s.t.

General classification after stage 6

Rank	Rider	Team	Time
1	Johan van der Velde (NED)	Panasonic–Merckx–Agu	23h 49' 47"
2	Dominique Gaigne (FRA)	Système U	+ 36"
3	Guido Bontempi (ITA)	Carrera Jeans–Vagabond	+ 37"
4	Thierry Marie (FRA)	Système U	+ 42"
5	Charly Mottet (FRA)	Système U	+ 45"
6	Laurent Fignon (FRA)	Système U	+ 49"
7	Joël Pelier (FRA)	Kas	+ 56"
8	Yvon Madiot (FRA)	Système U	+ 1' 02"
9	Éric Boyer (FRA)	Système U	+ 1' 05"
10	Erich Maechler (SUI)	Carrera Jeans–Vagabond	+ 1' 28"

== Stage 7 ==
10 July 1986 — Cherbourg to Saint-Hilaire-du-Harcouët, 201 km (125 mi)

Stage 7 result

Rank	Rider	Team	Time
1	Ludo Peeters (BEL)	Kwantum–Decosol–Yoko	4h 57' 00"
2	Ron Kiefel (USA)	7-Eleven	s.t.
3	Miguel Induráin (ESP)	Reynolds	s.t.
4	Jørgen V. Pedersen (DEN)	Carrera Jeans–Vagabond	s.t.
5	Jesús Blanco Villar (ESP)	Teka	s.t.
6	Peter Stevenhaagen (NED)	PDM–Ultima–Concorde	s.t.
7	Éric Caritoux (FRA)	Fagor	s.t.
8	Antonio Esparza (ESP)	Seat–Orbea	s.t.
9	Paul Kimmage (IRL)	RMO–Cycles Méral–Mavic	s.t.
10	Dirk De Wolf (BEL)	Hitachi–Robland	s.t.

General classification after stage 7

Rank	Rider	Team	Time
1	Jørgen V. Pedersen (DEN)	Carrera Jeans–Vagabond	28h 48' 36"
2	Johan van der Velde (NED)	Panasonic–Merckx–Agu	+ 11"
3	Guido Bontempi (ITA)	Carrera Jeans–Vagabond	+ 27"
4	Laurent Fignon (FRA)	Système U	+ 45"
5	Dominique Gaigne (FRA)	Système U	+ 50"
6	Thierry Marie (FRA)	Système U	+ 56"
7	Charly Mottet (FRA)	Système U	+ 59"
8	Joël Pelier (FRA)	Kas	+ 1' 10"
9	Éric Boyer (FRA)	Système U	+ 1' 13"
10	Yvon Madiot (FRA)	Système U	+ 1' 16"

== Stage 8 ==
11 July 1986 — Saint-Hilaire-du-Harcouët to Nantes, 204 km (127 mi)

Stage 8 result

Rank	Rider	Team	Time
1	Eddy Planckaert (BEL)	Panasonic–Merckx–Agu	4h 39' 55"
2	Eric Vanderaerden (BEL)	Panasonic–Merckx–Agu	s.t.
3	Jozef Lieckens (BEL)	Joker–Emerxil–Merckx	s.t.
4	Carlo Bomans (BEL)	Joker–Emerxil–Merckx	s.t.
5	Guido Bontempi (ITA)	Carrera Jeans–Vagabond	s.t.
6	Cees Priem (NED)	Kwantum–Decosol–Yoko	s.t.
7	Alex Stieda (CAN)	7-Eleven	s.t.
8	Francis Castaing (FRA)	RMO–Cycles Méral–Mavic	s.t.
9	Jean-Philippe Vandenbrande (BEL)	Hitachi–Robland	s.t.
10	Mathieu Hermans (NED)	Seat–Orbea	s.t.

General classification after stage 8

Rank	Rider	Team	Time
1	Jørgen V. Pedersen (DEN)	Carrera Jeans–Vagabond	33h 28' 31"
2	Johan van der Velde (NED)	Panasonic–Merckx–Agu	+ 8"
3	Guido Bontempi (ITA)	Carrera Jeans–Vagabond	+ 27"
4	Dominique Gaigne (FRA)	Système U	+ 44"
5	Laurent Fignon (FRA)	Système U	+ 45"
6	Thierry Marie (FRA)	Système U	+ 56"
7	Charly Mottet (FRA)	Système U	+ 59"
8	Éric Boyer (FRA)	Système U	+ 1' 07"
9	Bruno Cornillet (FRA)	Peugeot–Shell	+ 1' 09"
10	Joël Pelier (FRA)	Kas	+ 1' 10"

== Stage 9 ==
12 July 1986 — Nantes to Nantes, 61.5 km (38.2 mi) (ITT)

Stage 9 result

Rank	Rider	Team	Time
1	Bernard Hinault (FRA)	La Vie Claire	1h 18' 46"
2	Greg LeMond (USA)	La Vie Claire	+ 44"
3	Stephen Roche (IRL)	Carrera Jeans–Vagabond	+ 1' 01"
4	Julián Gorospe (ESP)	Reynolds	+ 1' 24"
5	Urs Zimmermann (SUI)	Carrera Jeans–Vagabond	+ 1' 42"
6	Jørgen V. Pedersen (DEN)	Carrera Jeans–Vagabond	s.t.
7	Joël Pelier (FRA)	Kas	+ 1' 48"
8	Silvano Contini (ITA)	Gis Gelati	+ 1' 58"
9	Robert Millar (GBR)	Panasonic–Merckx–Agu	+ 2' 00"
10	Jean-François Bernard (FRA)	La Vie Claire	+ 2' 06"

General classification after stage 9

Rank	Rider	Team	Time
1	Jørgen V. Pedersen (DEN)	Carrera Jeans–Vagabond	34h 49' 00"
2	Stephen Roche (IRL)	Carrera Jeans–Vagabond	+ 1' 05"
3	Bernard Hinault (FRA)	La Vie Claire	+ 1' 10"
4	Joël Pelier (FRA)	Kas	+ 1' 15"
5	Thierry Marie (FRA)	Système U	+ 1' 24"
6	Charly Mottet (FRA)	Système U	+ 1' 43"
7	Urs Zimmermann (SUI)	Carrera Jeans–Vagabond	+ 1' 53"
8	Greg LeMond (USA)	La Vie Claire	+ 1' 59"
9	Eric Vanderaerden (BEL)	Panasonic–Merckx–Agu	+ 2' 26"
10	Robert Millar (GBR)	Panasonic–Merckx–Agu	+ 2' 34"

== Stage 10 ==
13 July 1986 — Nantes to Futuroscope, 183 km (114 mi)

Stage 10 result

Rank	Rider	Team	Time
1	Ángel Sarrapio (ESP)	Teka	4h 27' 16"
2	Jean-Claude Bagot (FRA)	Fagor	+ 1"
3	Eric Vanderaerden (BEL)	Panasonic–Merckx–Agu	+ 2' 42"
4	Frank Hoste (BEL)	Fagor	s.t.
5	Jozef Lieckens (BEL)	Joker–Emerxil–Merckx	s.t.
6	Johan van der Velde (NED)	Panasonic–Merckx–Agu	s.t.
7	Jean-Louis Gauthier (FRA)	RMO–Cycles Méral–Mavic	s.t.
8	Francis Castaing (FRA)	RMO–Cycles Méral–Mavic	s.t.
9	Jean-Philippe Vandenbrande (BEL)	Hitachi–Robland	s.t.
10	Mathieu Hermans (NED)	Seat–Orbea	s.t.

General classification after stage 10

Rank	Rider	Team	Time
1	Jørgen V. Pedersen (DEN)	Carrera Jeans–Vagabond	39h 18' 58"
2	Joël Pelier (FRA)	Kas	+ 1' 03"
3	Stephen Roche (IRL)	Carrera Jeans–Vagabond	+ 1' 05"
4	Bernard Hinault (FRA)	La Vie Claire	+ 1' 10"
5	Thierry Marie (FRA)	Système U	+ 1' 24"
6	Charly Mottet (FRA)	Système U	+ 1' 43"
7	Urs Zimmermann (SUI)	Carrera Jeans–Vagabond	+ 1' 53"
8	Greg LeMond (USA)	La Vie Claire	+ 1' 59"
9	Eric Vanderaerden (BEL)	Panasonic–Merckx–Agu	+ 2' 26"
10	Robert Millar (GBR)	Panasonic–Merckx–Agu	+ 2' 34"

== Stage 11 ==
14 July 1986 — Poitiers to Bordeaux, 258.5 km (160.6 mi)

Stage 11 result

Rank	Rider	Team	Time
1	Rudy Dhaenens (BEL)	Hitachi–Robland	6h 12' 40"
2	Mathieu Hermans (NED)	Seat–Orbea	s.t.
3	Laurent Biondi (FRA)	Système U	+ 2"
4	Sean Yates (GBR)	Peugeot–Shell	+ 9"
5	Philippe Leleu (FRA)	La Vie Claire	s.t.
6	Guy Nulens (NED)	Panasonic–Merckx–Agu	s.t.
7	Nico Emonds (BEL)	Kwantum–Decosol–Yoko	s.t.
8	Claude Criquielion (BEL)	Hitachi–Robland	s.t.
9	Martin Earley (IRL)	Fagor	s.t.
10	Jesús Rodríguez Magro (ESP)	Zor–BH	s.t.

General classification after stage 11

Rank	Rider	Team	Time
1	Jørgen V. Pedersen (DEN)	Carrera Jeans–Vagabond	45h 32' 08"
2	Joël Pelier (FRA)	Kas	+ 1' 00"
3	Stephen Roche (IRL)	Carrera Jeans–Vagabond	+ 1' 05"
4	Bernard Hinault (FRA)	La Vie Claire	+ 1' 10"
5	Thierry Marie (FRA)	Système U	+ 1' 24"
6	Charly Mottet (FRA)	Système U	+ 1' 43"
7	Urs Zimmermann (SUI)	Carrera Jeans–Vagabond	+ 1' 53"
8	Greg LeMond (USA)	La Vie Claire	s.t.
9	Eric Vanderaerden (BEL)	Panasonic–Merckx–Agu	+ 2' 23"
10	Robert Millar (GBR)	Panasonic–Merckx–Agu	+ 2' 34"
