= List of teams and cyclists in the 1985 Giro d'Italia =

The 1985 Giro d'Italia was the 68th edition of the Giro d'Italia, one of cycling's Grand Tours. The field consisted of 180 riders, and 135 riders finished the race.

== By rider ==
Legend
No.	Starting number worn by the rider during the Giro
Pos.	Position in the general classification
DNF	Denotes a rider who did not finish

No.	Name	Nationality	Team	Ref
1	Francesco Moser	Italy	Gis Gelati	
2	David Akam	Great Britain	Gis Gelati	
3	Roberto Calovi	Italy	Gis Gelati	
4	Walter Dalgal	Belgium	Gis Gelati	
5	Stefano Giuliani	Italy	Gis Gelati	
6	Piero Ghibaudo	Italy	Gis Gelati	
7	Walter Magnago	Italy	Gis Gelati	
8	Harald Maier	Austria	Gis Gelati	
9	Palmiro Masciarelli	Italy	Gis Gelati	
11	Marino Lejarreta	Spain	Alpilatte–Olmo–Cierre	
12	Marino Amadori	Italy	Alpilatte–Olmo–Cierre	
13	Serge Demierre	Switzerland	Alpilatte–Olmo–Cierre	
14	Michael Wilson	Australia	Alpilatte–Olmo–Cierre	
15	Salvatore Maccali	Italy	Alpilatte–Olmo–Cierre	
16	Orlando Maini	Italy	Alpilatte–Olmo–Cierre	
17	Romano Randi	Italy	Alpilatte–Olmo–Cierre	
18	Maurizio Rossi	Italy	Alpilatte–Olmo–Cierre	
19	Mauro Angelucci	Italy	Alpilatte–Olmo–Cierre	
21	Silvano Contini	Italy	Ariostea–Oece	
22	Gregor Braun	West Germany	Ariostea–Oece	
23	Marco Giovannetti	Italy	Ariostea–Oece	
24	Wladimiro Panizza	Italy	Ariostea–Oece	
25	Giuseppe Petito	Italy	Ariostea–Oece	
26	Alessandro Pozzi	Italy	Ariostea–Oece	
27	Ennio Salvador	Italy	Ariostea–Oece	
28	Guido Van Calster	Belgium	Ariostea–Oece	
29	Ennio Vanotti	Italy	Ariostea–Oece	
31	Salvatore Cavallaro	Italy	Atala	
32	Urs Freuler	Switzerland	Atala	
33	Pierino Gavazzi	Italy	Atala	
34	Daniel Gisiger	Switzerland	Atala	
35	Dante Morandi	Italy	Atala	
36	Ezio Moroni	Italy	Atala	
37	Mario Noris	Italy	Atala	
38	Emilio Ravasio	Italy	Atala	
39	Gerhard Zadrobilek	Austria	Atala	
41	Roberto Visentini	Italy	Carrera–Inoxpran	
42	Guido Bontempi	Italy	Carrera–Inoxpran	
43	Bruno Leali	Italy	Carrera–Inoxpran	
44	Czesław Lang	Poland	Carrera–Inoxpran	
45	Claudio Chiappucci	Italy	Carrera–Inoxpran	
46	Massimo Ghirotto	Italy	Carrera–Inoxpran	
47	Erich Maechler	Switzerland	Carrera–Inoxpran	
48	Urs Zimmermann	Switzerland	Carrera–Inoxpran	
49	Stefan Mutter	Switzerland	Carrera–Inoxpran	
51	Giuseppe Saronni	Italy	Del Tongo–Colnago	
52	Emanuele Bombini	Italy	Del Tongo–Colnago	
53	Roberto Ceruti	Italy	Del Tongo–Colnago	
54	Frank Hoste	Belgium	Del Tongo–Colnago	
55	Luciano Loro	Italy	Del Tongo–Colnago	
56	Maurizio Piovani	Italy	Del Tongo–Colnago	
57	Rudy Pevenage	Belgium	Del Tongo–Colnago	
58	Dirk Wayenberg	Belgium	Del Tongo–Colnago	
59	Marco Vitali	Italy	Del Tongo–Colnago	
61	Alfio Vandi	Italy	Dromedario–Laminox	
62	Silvano Riccò	Italy	Dromedario–Laminox	
63	Marco Franceschini	Italy	Dromedario–Laminox	
64	Gottfried Schmutz	Switzerland	Dromedario–Laminox	
65	Leo Schönenberger	Switzerland	Dromedario–Laminox	
66	Giuseppe Montella	Italy	Dromedario–Laminox	
67	Stefano Colagè	Italy	Dromedario–Laminox	
68	Daniele Ferrari	Italy	Dromedario–Laminox	
69	Enrico Pochini	Italy	Dromedario–Laminox	
71	Ángel Arroyo	Spain	Zor–Gemeaz Cusin	
72	Domenico Cavallo	Italy	Zor–Gemeaz Cusin	
73	José Luis Navarro	Spain	Zor–Gemeaz Cusin	
74	Aladino Garcia	Spain	Zor–Gemeaz Cusin	
75	Ángel Camarillo	Spain	Zor–Gemeaz Cusin	
76	Peter Pieters	Netherlands	Zor–Gemeaz Cusin	
77	Francisco Antequera	Spain	Zor–Gemeaz Cusin	
78	Anselmo Fuerte	Spain	Zor–Gemeaz Cusin	
79	Roberto Córdoba	Spain	Zor–Gemeaz Cusin	
81	Bernard Hinault	France	La Vie Claire	
82	Dominique Arnaud	France	La Vie Claire	
83	Benno Wiss	Switzerland	La Vie Claire	
84	Kim Eriksen	Denmark	La Vie Claire	
85	Marc Gomez	France	La Vie Claire	
86	Christian Jourdan	France	La Vie Claire	
87	Greg LeMond	United States	La Vie Claire	
88	Éric Salomon	France	La Vie Claire	
89	Bernard Vallet	France	La Vie Claire	
91	Franco Chioccioli	Italy	Maggi Mobili–Fanini	
92	Cesare Cipollini	Italy	Maggi Mobili–Fanini	
93	Mario Bonzi	Italy	Maggi Mobili–Fanini	
94	Fabrizio Vannucci	Italy	Maggi Mobili–Fanini	
95	Benedetto Patellaro	Italy	Maggi Mobili–Fanini	
96	Fabio Patuelli	Italy	Maggi Mobili–Fanini	
97	Filippo Piersanti	Italy	Maggi Mobili–Fanini	
98	Steen-Michael Petersen	Denmark	Maggi Mobili–Fanini	
99	Jens Veggerby	Denmark	Maggi Mobili–Fanini	
101	Gilbert Glaus	Switzerland	Cilo–Aufina–Magniflex	
102	Hubert Seiz	Switzerland	Cilo–Aufina–Magniflex	
103	Laurent Vial	Switzerland	Cilo–Aufina–Magniflex	
104	Mike Gutmann	Switzerland	Cilo–Aufina–Magniflex	
105	André Massard	Switzerland	Cilo–Aufina–Magniflex	
106	Heinz Imboden	Switzerland	Cilo–Aufina–Magniflex	
107	Bernard Gavillet	Switzerland	Cilo–Aufina–Magniflex	
108	Alfred Achermann	Switzerland	Cilo–Aufina–Magniflex	
109	Daniel Wyder	Switzerland	Cilo–Aufina–Magniflex	
111	Stefano Allocchio	Italy	Malvor–Bottecchia–Vaporella	
112	Mario Beccia	Italy	Malvor–Bottecchia–Vaporella	
113	Leonardo Bevilacqua	Italy	Malvor–Bottecchia–Vaporella	
114	Mauro Longo	Italy	Malvor–Bottecchia–Vaporella	
115	Silvestro Milani	Italy	Malvor–Bottecchia–Vaporella	
116	Roberto Pagnin	Italy	Malvor–Bottecchia–Vaporella	
117	Renan Ferraro	Brazil	Malvor–Bottecchia–Vaporella	
118	Jürg Bruggmann	Switzerland	Malvor–Bottecchia–Vaporella	
119	Acácio da Silva	Portugal	Malvor–Bottecchia–Vaporella	
121	Stefano Bizzoni	Italy	Murella–Rossin	
122	Tullio Cortinovis	Italy	Murella–Rossin	
123	Raniero Gradi	Italy	Murella–Rossin	
124	Dag Erik Pedersen	Norway	Murella–Rossin	
125	Alessandro Paganessi	Italy	Murella–Rossin	
126	Marino Polini	Italy	Murella–Rossin	
127	Giovanni Renosto	Italy	Murella–Rossin	
128	Luca Rota	Italy	Murella–Rossin	
129	Daniele Del Ben	Italy	Murella–Rossin	
131	Argemiro Bohórquez	Colombia	Varta–Café de Colombia–Mavic	
132	Armando Aristizabal	Colombia	Varta–Café de Colombia–Mavic	
133	Rafael Acevedo	Colombia	Varta–Café de Colombia–Mavic	
134	Néstor Mora	Colombia	Varta–Café de Colombia–Mavic	
135	Alfonso Lopez	Colombia	Varta–Café de Colombia–Mavic	
136	Reynel Montoya	Colombia	Varta–Café de Colombia–Mavic	
137	Abelardo Ríos	Colombia	Varta–Café de Colombia–Mavic	
138	Juan Carlos Castillo	Colombia	Varta–Café de Colombia–Mavic	
139	Antonio Londoño	Colombia	Varta–Café de Colombia–Mavic	
141	Moreno Argentin	Italy	Sammontana–Bianchi	
142	Tullio Bertacco	Italy	Sammontana–Bianchi	
143	Dario Mariuzzo	Italy	Sammontana–Bianchi	
144	Tommy Prim	Sweden	Sammontana–Bianchi	
145	Paolo Rosola	Italy	Sammontana–Bianchi	
146	Alf Segersäll	Sweden	Sammontana–Bianchi	
147	Alberto Volpi	Italy	Sammontana–Bianchi	
148	Jesper Worre	Denmark	Sammontana–Bianchi	
149	Claudio Torelli	Italy	Sammontana–Bianchi	
151	Lucien Van Impe	Belgium	Santini	
152	Daniele Caroli	Italy	Santini	
153	Davide Cassani	Italy	Santini	
154	Giuseppe Lanzoni	Italy	Santini	
155	Patrizio Gambirasio	Italy	Santini	
156	Maurizio Conti	Italy	Santini	
157	Giuliano Pavanello	Italy	Santini	
158	Rigobert Matt	West Germany	Santini	
159	Elio Festa	Italy	Santini	
161	Jeff Bradley	United States	7-Eleven	
162	Jonathan Boyer	United States	7-Eleven	
163	Chris Carmichael	United States	7-Eleven	
164	Andrew Hampsten	United States	7-Eleven	
165	Eric Heiden	United States	7-Eleven	
166	Ron Kiefel	United States	7-Eleven	
167	Davis Phinney	United States	7-Eleven	
168	Bob Roll	United States	7-Eleven	
169	Tom Schuler	United States	7-Eleven	
171	Alain Von Allmen	Switzerland	Skil–Sem–Kas–Miko	
172	Frits Pirard	Netherlands	Skil–Sem–Kas–Miko	
173	Gerrie Knetemann	Netherlands	Skil–Sem–Kas–Miko	
174	Jacques van Meer	Netherlands	Skil–Sem–Kas–Miko	
175	Ronan Onghena	Belgium	Skil–Sem–Kas–Miko	
176	Ralf Hofeditz	West Germany	Skil–Sem–Kas–Miko	
177	Philippe Poissonnier	France	Skil–Sem–Kas–Miko	
178	Jacques Decrion	France	Skil–Sem–Kas–Miko	
179	René Bittinger	France	Skil–Sem–Kas–Miko	
181	Gianbattista Baronchelli	Italy	Supermercati Brianzoli	
182	Claudio Corti	Italy	Supermercati Brianzoli	
183	Giovanni Mantovani	Italy	Supermercati Brianzoli	
184	Alfredo Chinetti	Italy	Supermercati Brianzoli	
185	Gaetano Baronchelli	Italy	Supermercati Brianzoli	
186	Antonio Bevilacqua	Italy	Supermercati Brianzoli	
187	Giovanni Bottoia	Italy	Supermercati Brianzoli	
188	Gianni Zola	Italy	Supermercati Brianzoli	
189	Antonio Ferretti	Switzerland	Supermercati Brianzoli	
191	Vittorio Algeri	Italy	Vini Ricordi–Pinarello–Sidermec	
192	Pierangelo Bincoletto	Italy	Vini Ricordi–Pinarello–Sidermec	
193	Riccardo Magrini	Italy	Vini Ricordi–Pinarello–Sidermec	
194	Franco Pica	Italy	Vini Ricordi–Pinarello–Sidermec	
195	Luciano Rabottini	Italy	Vini Ricordi–Pinarello–Sidermec	
196	Claudio Savini	Italy	Vini Ricordi–Pinarello–Sidermec	
197	Sergio Scremin	Italy	Vini Ricordi–Pinarello–Sidermec	
198	Johan van der Velde	Netherlands	Vini Ricordi–Pinarello–Sidermec	
199	Wies Van Dongen	Netherlands	Vini Ricordi–Pinarello–Sidermec	
