= Siemons =

Siemons is a Dutch patronymic surname, where Siemon is an archaic spelling of Simon. Notable people with the surname include:

- Amy Siemons (born 1985), Dutch wheelchair racer
- Jan Siemons (born 1964), Dutch cyclist
