= Anan, Haute-Garonne =

Anan
- Commune
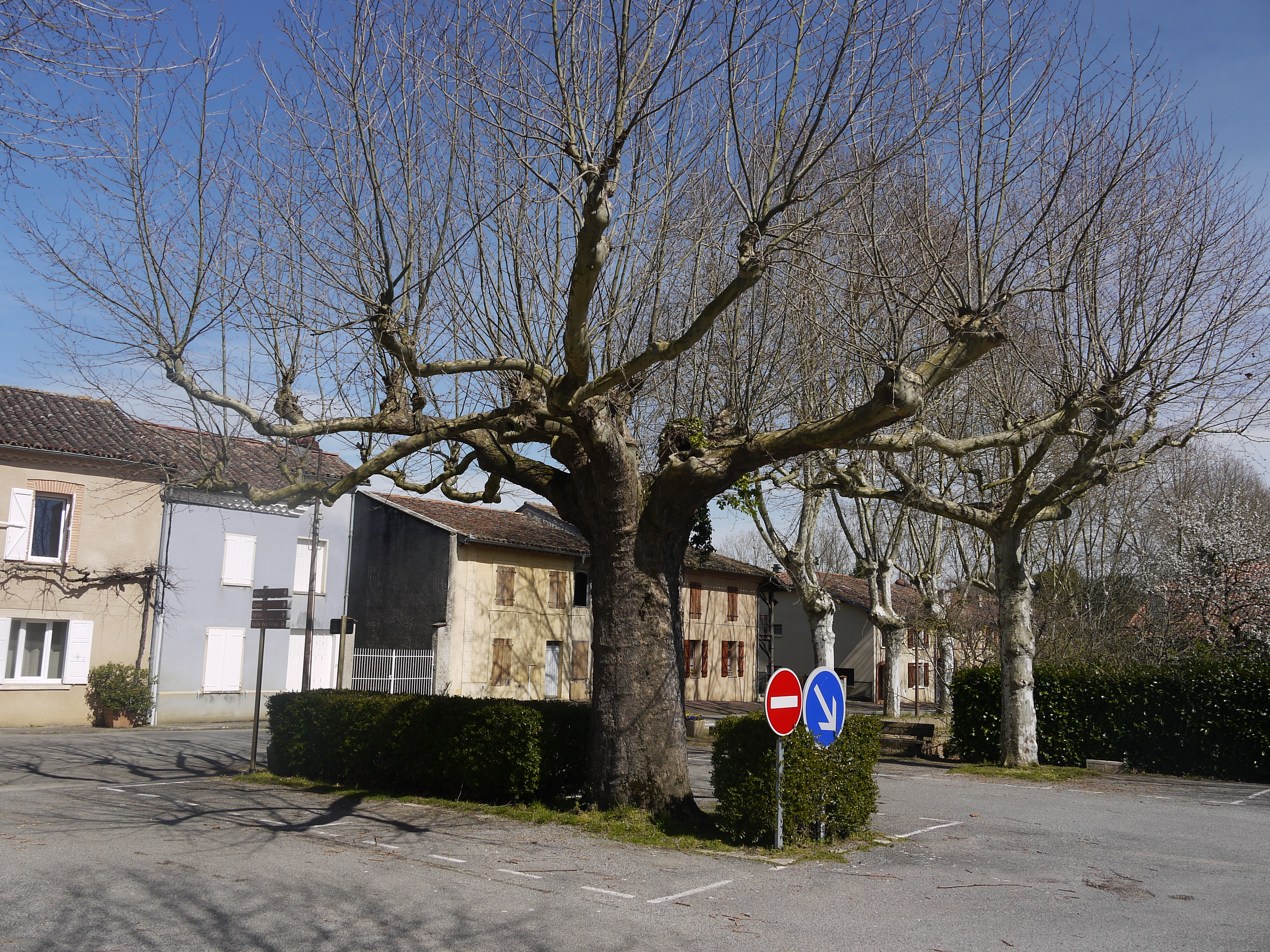
- A street in Anan.
- Location of Anan
- Location within France Location within Occitanie
- Coordinates: 43°21′23″N 0°48′54″E
- Country: France
- Region: Occitania
- Department: Haute-Garonne
- Arrondissement: Saint-Gaudens
- Canton: Cazères
- Intercommunality: Cœur et Coteaux du Comminges

Government
  - Mayor (2020–2026): Laurent Briol
- Area^{1}: 13.43 km^{2} (5.19 sq mi)
- Elevation: 210 m (690 ft)
- Highest elevation: 327 m (1,073 ft)
- Lowest elevation: 199 m (653 ft)
- Population (2023): 267
  - Density: 19.9/km^{2} (51.5/sq mi)
- Time zone: UTC+01:00 (CET)
  - Summer (DST): UTC+02:00 (CEST)
- INSEE/Postal code: 31008 /31230
- ^{1} French Land Register data, which excludes lakes, ponds, glaciers > 1 km^{2} (0.386 sq mi or 247 acres) and river estuaries.

Anan (French pronunciation: [anɑ̃]) is a commune in the Haute-Garonne department in southwestern France.

== Population ==
Historical population
Year	Pop.	±% p.a.
1968	270	—
1975	261	−0.48%
1982	244	−0.96%
1990	238	−0.31%
1999	230	−0.38%
2007	221	−0.50%
2012	221	+0.00%
2017	243	+1.92%
2023	267	+1.58%
Source: INSEE

== See also ==
- Communes of the Haute-Garonne department
