= Marco Antonio León =

Colombian cyclist

Personal information
- Born: 16 December 1962 (age 63) Bogotá, Colombia

Cycling career
- Sport: Cycling
- Current team: Retired
- Discipline: Road
- Role: Rider

Professional teams
- 1985: Colpatria
- 1985–1989: Varta–Café de Colombia–Mavic

Marco Antonio León (born 16 December 1962) is a Colombian former professional racing cyclist. He rode in three editions of the Tour de France.

== Major results ==
1984
1st Stage 4 Clásico RCN

=== Grand Tour general classification results timeline ===
Grand Tour	1986	1987	1988	1989
Giro d'Italia	—	—	—	—
Tour de France	86	44	73	—
Vuelta a España	64	26	—	83
