= Martres-de-Rivière =

- Commune
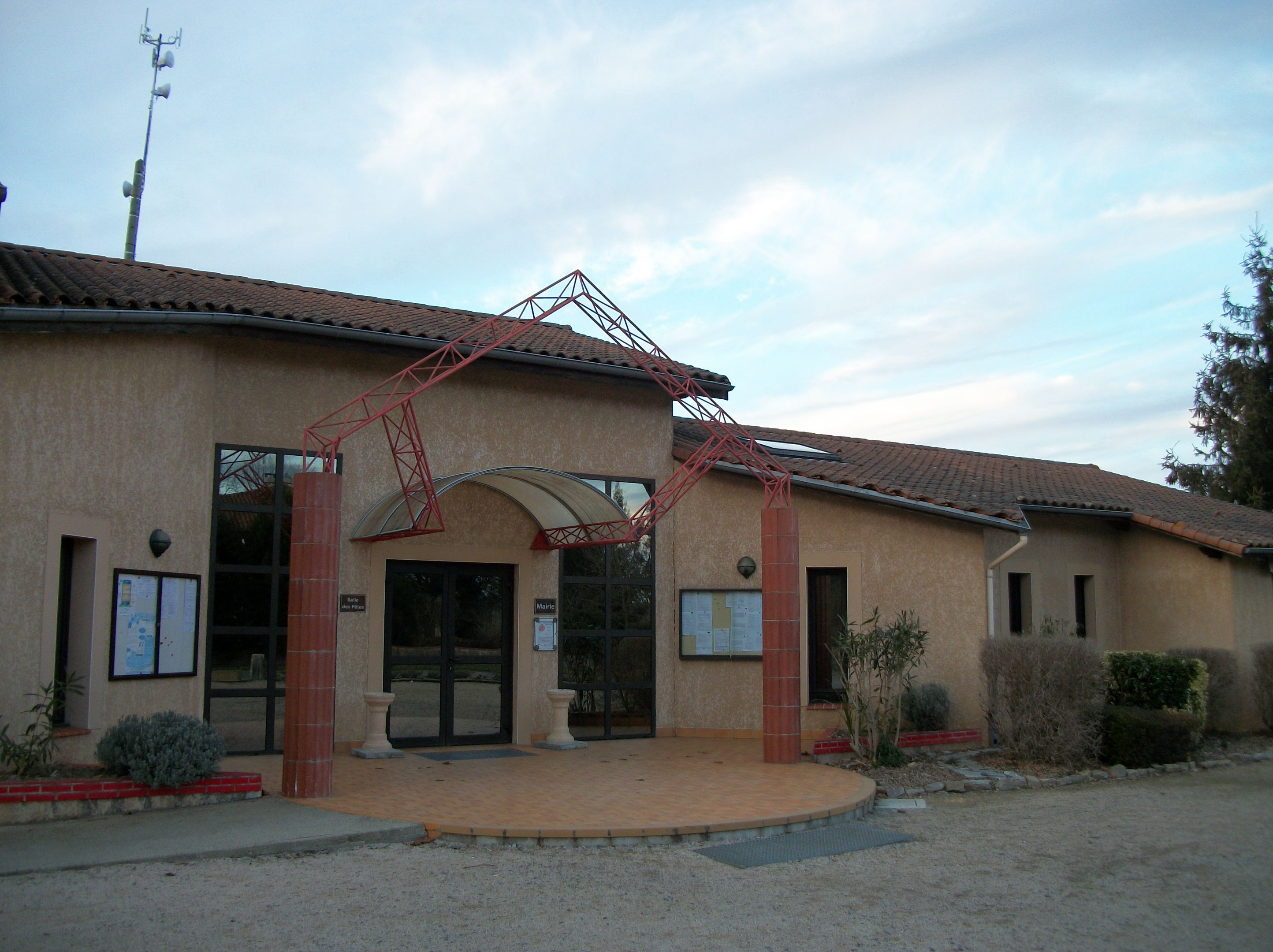
- The town hall in Martres-de-Rivière

- Coat of arms
- Location of Martres-de-Rivière
- Location within France Location within Occitanie
- Coordinates: 43°04′48″N 0°38′32″E
- Country: France
- Region: Occitania
- Department: Haute-Garonne
- Arrondissement: Saint-Gaudens
- Canton: Bagnères-de-Luchon
- Intercommunality: Pyrénées Haut-Garonnaises

Government
  - Mayor (2020–2026): Jean-Paul Salvatico
- Area^{1}: 3.59 km^{2} (1.39 sq mi)
- Highest elevation: 569 m (1,867 ft)
- Lowest elevation: 391 m (1,283 ft)
- Population (2023): 418
  - Density: 116/km^{2} (302/sq mi)
- Time zone: UTC+01:00 (CET)
  - Summer (DST): UTC+02:00 (CEST)
- INSEE/Postal code: 31323 /31210
- ^{1} French Land Register data, which excludes lakes, ponds, glaciers > 1 km^{2} (0.386 sq mi or 247 acres) and river estuaries.

Martres-de-Rivière (French pronunciation: [maʁtʁ də ʁivjɛʁ]; Occitan: Martras de Ribèra) is a commune in the Haute-Garonne department in southwestern France.

== Population ==
Historical population
Year	Pop.	±% p.a.
1968	229	—
1975	240	+0.67%
1982	276	+2.02%
1990	292	+0.71%
1999	307	+0.56%
2007	363	+2.12%
2012	404	+2.16%
2017	357	−2.44%
2023	418	+2.66%
Source: INSEE

== See also ==
- Communes of the Haute-Garonne department
