= Cazaux-Layrisse =

- Commune
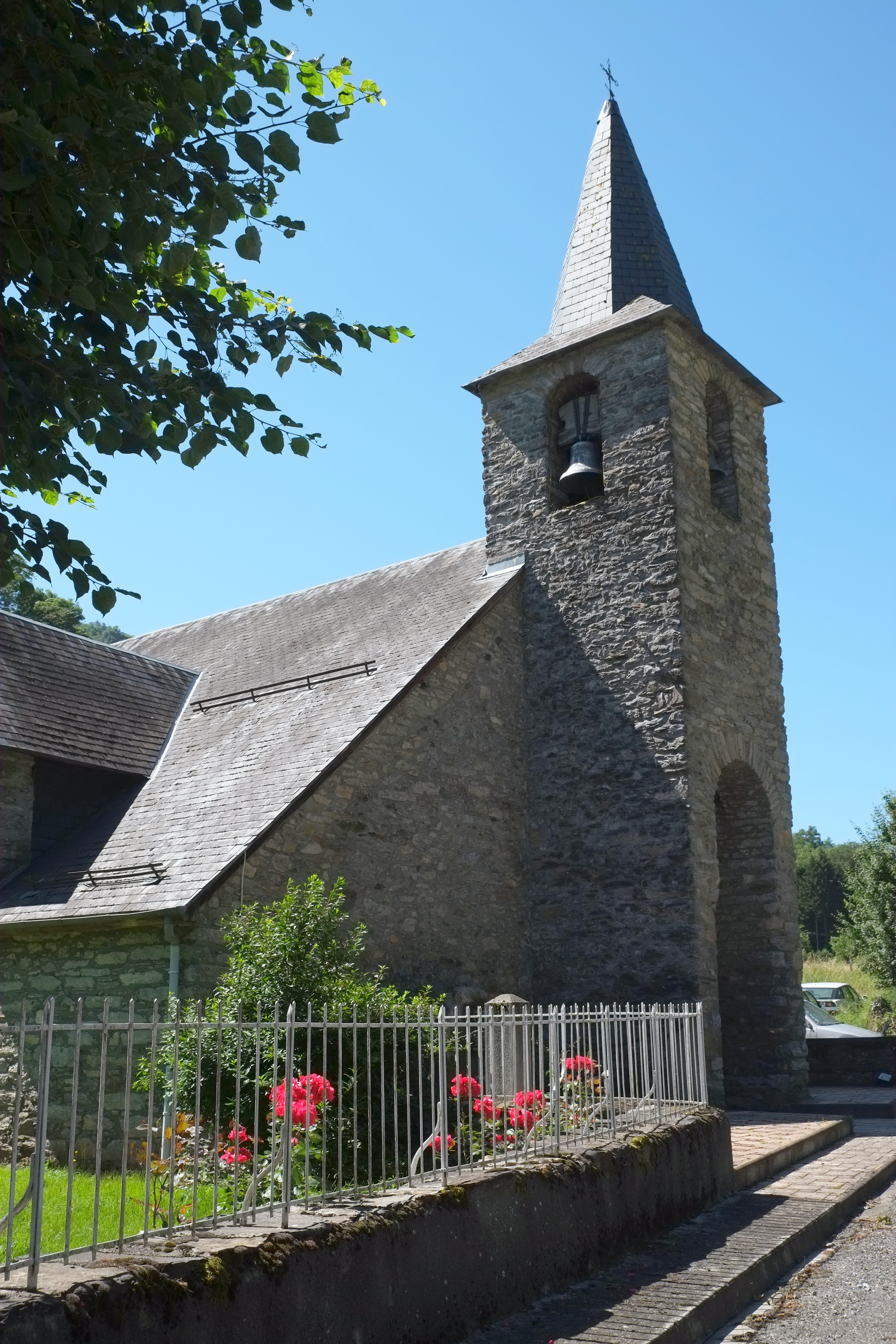
- The church in Cazaux-Layrisse
- Location of Cazaux-Layrisse
- Location within France Location within Occitanie
- Coordinates: 42°52′27″N 0°36′31″E
- Country: France
- Region: Occitania
- Department: Haute-Garonne
- Arrondissement: Saint-Gaudens
- Canton: Bagnères-de-Luchon
- Intercommunality: Pyrénées Haut Garonnaises

Government
  - Mayor (2020–2026): Jean-Pierre Dore
- Area^{1}: 2.76 km^{2} (1.07 sq mi)
- Elevation: 685 m (2,247 ft)
- Highest elevation: 1,776 m (5,827 ft)
- Lowest elevation: 589 m (1,932 ft)
- Population (2023): 59
  - Density: 21/km^{2} (55/sq mi)
- Time zone: UTC+01:00 (CET)
  - Summer (DST): UTC+02:00 (CEST)
- INSEE/Postal code: 31132 /31440
- ^{1} French Land Register data, which excludes lakes, ponds, glaciers > 1 km^{2} (0.386 sq mi or 247 acres) and river estuaries.

Cazaux-Layrisse is a commune in the Haute-Garonne department in southwestern France.

== Population ==
Historical population
Year	Pop.	±% p.a.
1968	49	—
1975	49	+0.00%
1982	56	+1.93%
1990	69	+2.64%
1999	86	+2.48%
2007	68	−2.89%
2012	59	−2.80%
2017	60	+0.34%
2023	59	−0.28%
Source: INSEE

== See also ==
- Communes of the Haute-Garonne department
