= Sergio Jaramillo =

Colombian cyclist

Personal information
- Born: 22 June 1958 (age 68) Medellín, Colombia

Cycling career
- Sport: Cycling
- Role: Rider

Sergio Jaramillo (born 22 June 1958) is a Colombian former professional racing cyclist. He rode in the 1986 Tour de France.
