= Bruno Huger =

French cyclist

Personal information
- Born: 10 August 1962 (age 64) Montoire-sur-le-Loir, France

Cycling career
- Sport: Cycling
- Role: Rider

Bruno Huger (born 10 August 1962) is a French former professional racing cyclist. He rode in the 1986 Tour de France.
