= Pedro Soler =

Colombian cyclist

Personal information
- Born: 20 January 1961 (age 65)

Cycling career
- Sport: Cycling
- Role: Rider

Pedro Soler (born 20 January 1961) is a Colombian former professional racing cyclist. He rode in the 1986 Tour de France.
