= Juan-Carlos Rozas Salgado =

Spanish cyclist

Personal information
- Born: 5 May 1963 (age 63) Valladolid, Spain

Cycling career
- Sport: Cycling
- Role: Rider

Juan-Carlos Rozas Salgado (born 5 May 1963) is a Spanish former professional racing cyclist. He rode in the 1986 Tour de France.
