= Montgaillard-sur-Save =

- Commune
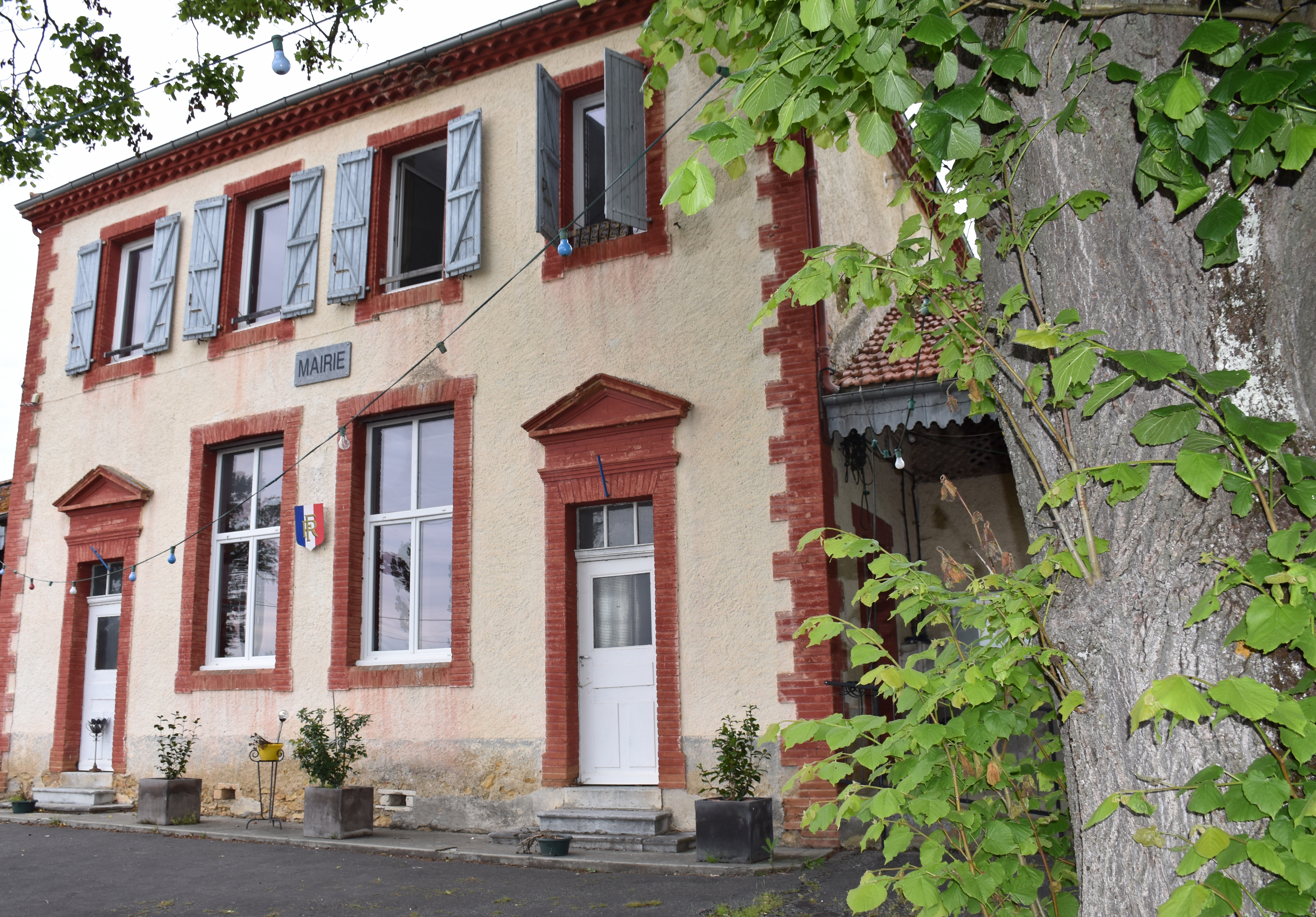
- Montgaillard-sur-Save Town Hall
- Location of Montgaillard-sur-Save
- Location within France Location within Occitanie
- Coordinates: 43°15′18″N 0°43′48″E
- Country: France
- Region: Occitania
- Department: Haute-Garonne
- Arrondissement: Saint-Gaudens
- Canton: Saint-Gaudens

Government
  - Mayor (2020–2026): Julien Chainet
- Area^{1}: 4.13 km^{2} (1.59 sq mi)
- Elevation: 369 m (1,211 ft)
- Highest elevation: 363 m (1,191 ft)
- Lowest elevation: 255 m (837 ft)
- Population (2023): 66
  - Density: 16/km^{2} (41/sq mi)
- Time zone: UTC+01:00 (CET)
  - Summer (DST): UTC+02:00 (CEST)
- INSEE/Postal code: 31378 /31350
- ^{1} French Land Register data, which excludes lakes, ponds, glaciers > 1 km^{2} (0.386 sq mi or 247 acres) and river estuaries.

Montgaillard-sur-Save (French pronunciation: [mɔ̃ɡajaʁ syʁ sav], literally Montgaillard on Save; Occitan: Montgalhard de Sava) is a commune in the Haute-Garonne department of southwestern France.

== Population ==
Historical population
| Year | Pop. | ±% p.a. |
|---|---|---|
| 1968 | 83 | — |
| 1975 | 64 | −3.65% |
| 1982 | 63 | −0.22% |
| 1990 | 69 | +1.14% |
| 1999 | 66 | −0.49% |
| 2007 | 77 | +1.95% |
| 2012 | 76 | −0.26% |
| 2017 | 84 | +2.02% |
| 2023 | 66 | −3.94% |
Source: INSEE

== See also ==
- Communes of the Haute-Garonne department
