= Renan Ferraro =

Brazilian cyclist

Personal information
- Born: 22 January 1962 (age 64) Rio de Janeiro, Brazil

Cycling career
- Sport: Cycling
- Role: Rider

Renan Ferraro (born 22 January 1962) is a Brazilian former professional racing cyclist. He rode in the 1986 Tour de France. He also rode in the team time trial at the 1984 Summer Olympics.
