= Jean-Claude Garde =

French cyclist

Personal information
- Born: 12 September 1960 (age 66) Condrieu, France

Cycling career
- Sport: Cycling
- Discipline: Road
- Role: Rider

Professional teams
- 1984–1985: Skil–Reydel–Sem–Mavic
- 1986: Kas
- 1987: La Vie Claire
- 1988–1989: Système U–Gitane

Jean-Claude Garde (born 12 September 1960) is a French former professional racing cyclist. He rode in the 1986 Tour de France and the 1985 Vuelta a España, finishing 57th overall. He also placed 69th overall in the 1985 Vuelta a España.

== Major results ==
1985
3rd Overall Tour du Limousin
1988
10th Grand Prix d'Isbergues
1989
7th GP de la Ville de Rennes
