= Argemiro Bohórquez =

Colombian cyclist

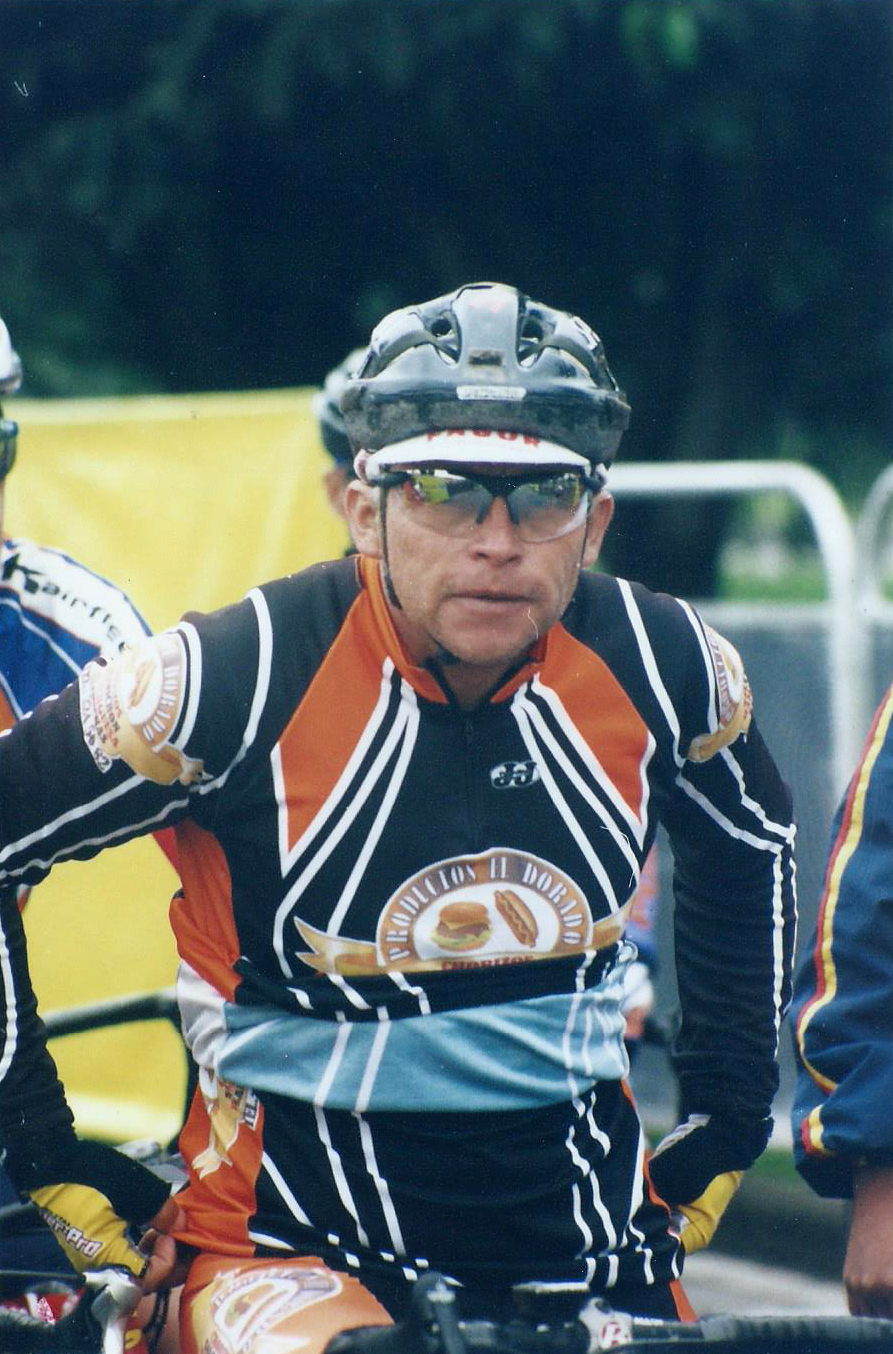
- Argemiro Bohorquez in 2007

Personal information
- Born: 28 January 1960 (age 66) Bogotá, Colombia

Cycling career
- Sport: Cycling
- Discipline: Road
- Role: Rider

Amateur teams
- 1980: Onix Sello Negro
- 1981: Perfumería Yaneth
- 1982: Champaña Madame Collette-Hotel Barlovento
- 1983: Banco de Colombia
- 1984: Pilas Varta
- 1985: Colpatria

Professional teams
- 1985: Varta–Café de Colombia–Mavic
- 1986: Fagor
- 1987–1988: Café de Colombia–Varta
- 1989: Pony Malta

Argemiro Bohórquez (born 28 January 1960) is a Colombian former professional racing cyclist. He rode in two editions of the Tour de France.

== Major results ==
1983
1st Overall Tour de Guadeloupe
1984
1st Stages 2 & 3 Vuelta a Colombia
8th Overall Tour de l'Avenir
1987
1st Stage 4 Clásico RCN

=== Grand Tour general classification results timeline ===
Grand Tour	1985	1986	1987
Giro d'Italia	DNF	DNF	—
Tour de France	—	DNF	69
Vuelta a España	—	—	20
