= Antonio Londoño =

Colombian cyclist

Personal information
- Nickname: Toño
- Born: 15 December 1954 (age 71) Medellín, Colombia

Cycling career
- Sport: Cycling
- Discipline: Road
- Role: Rider

Amateur teams
- 1974–1975: Ferretería Reina
- 1976: Polímeros Colombianos
- 1977–1978: Castalia
- 1979–1982: Freskola
- 1983: Canada Dry

Professional teams
- 1985: Varta–Renault
- 1985: Varta–Café de Colombia–Mavic
- 1986: Felipe Almacenes y Joyerías
- 1986: Coca Cola–Caja Social
- 1986: Postobón–Manzana
- 1987: Western–Rossin
- 1988: Pony Malta–Avianca

Antonio Londoño (born 15 December 1954) is a Colombian former professional racing cyclist. He rode in the 1986 Tour de France and the 1985 Giro d'Italia.

== Major results ==
1977
1st Overall Vuelta Ciclista de Chile

1st Stage 8

2nd Overall Clásica de Antioquia
1978
1st Overall Clásica Domingo a Domingo
2nd Team time trial, Pan American Road Championships
3rd Team time trial, Central American and Caribbean Games
1979
3rd Overall Vuelta Ciclista de Chile

1st Prologue (TTT)

1980
1st Stage 7 Vuelta a Colombia
2nd Overall Coors Classic
1981
1st Stage 1 (TTT) Vuelta a Colombia
1983
1st Stage 2a Clásico RCN
1st Stage 2 (TTT) Vuelta a Colombia
1984
2nd Overall Vuelta a Guatemala
1985
1st Overall Clásica de Antioquia
1986
1st Road race, National Road Championships
1st Stage 2 (TTT) Vuelta a Colombia
