= Hendrik Devos =

Belgian cyclist

Personal information
- Born: 13 October 1955 (age 71) Waregem, Belgium

Cycling career
- Sport: Cycling
- Role: Rider

Professional teams
- 1978–1979: Flandria-Velda
- 1980–1982: DAF Trucks–TeVe Blad
- 1983–: Splendor–Euro Shop
- –1989: Hitachi–VTM
- 1990: Isoglass–Garden Wood

Hendrik Devos (born 13 October 1955) is a former Belgian racing cyclist. He rode in eleven Grand Tours between 1979 and 1989.
