= Walter Magnago =

Italian cyclist

Personal information
- Born: 10 November 1960 (age 65) Trento, Italy

Cycling career
- Sport: Cycling
- Role: Rider

Walter Magnago (born 10 November 1960) is an Italian former racing cyclist. He rode in the Tour de France and the Giro d'Italia.
