= Joël Pelier =

French cyclist

Personal information
- Full name: Joël Pelier
- Born: 23 March 1962 (age 64) Valentigney, France

Cycling career
- Sport: Cycling
- Current team: Retired
- Discipline: Road
- Role: Rider

Professional teams
- 1985: Skil–Sem–Kas–Miko
- 1986: Kas
- 1987–1988: Système U
- 1987–1988: BH

Major wins
- Grand Tours Tour de France 1 individual stage (1989)

Joël Pelier (born 23 March 1962, in Valentigney) is a French former professional road bicycle racer.

After the final climb of stage 17 in the 1986 Tour de France, Pelier collapsed from exhaustion and fell into a 7-hour coma.

In the 1989 Tour de France, then 27-year-old domestique had never been watched in his pro career by his parents who were dedicated to caring for Pelier's severely disabled sibling who needed constant attention. His parents made arrangements to watch stage 6 from near the finish line to which he responded with an attempted lone breakaway, and held out to win the stage by 1 minute and 34 seconds. He rode on his own for 4 and a 1/2 hours through wind and rain for 102 of the stage's 161 miles. It was the then second longest breakaway in Tour de France history after Albert Bourlon in 1947 and since surpassed by Thierry Marie. On the podium for the day's presentations a tear drenched Pelier was seen on television saying, "Mon per, mon per". and "This win is so special to me because today is the first time that my mother and father have seen me in the Tour de France".

== Major results ==
1985
1st Stage 4a Paris–Nice
3rd Overall Tour d'Armorique
10th Overall Étoile de Bessèges
1986
2nd Overall Tour Méditerranéen
10th Overall Grand Prix du Midi Libre
1987
1st Stage 1 Tour de la Communauté Européenne
3rd Overall Tour d'Armorique
4th Overall Nissan Classic

1st Stage 2

5th GP Ouest–France
7th Overall Tour Midi-Pyrénées

1st Stage 4

1988
1st Stage 1a (ITT) Grand Prix du Midi Libre
6th Overall Tour d'Armorique
6th Trophée des Grimpeurs
7th Tour du Haut Var
1989
1st Stage 6 Tour de France
7th Overall Grand Prix du Midi Libre
10th Overall Tour Méditerranéen
1990
1st Stage 5 Tour de la Communauté Européenne

=== Grand Tour general classification results timeline ===
| Grand Tour | 1985 | 1986 | 1987 | 1988 | 1989 | 1990 |
|---|---|---|---|---|---|---|
| Vuelta a España | — | — | — | — | — | DNF |
| Giro d'Italia | — | — | — | — | — | — |
| Tour de France | 78 | DNF | — | 120 | 128 | — |

Legend
| — | Did not compete |
| DNF | Did not finish |
