= Francesco Rossignoli =

Italian cyclist

Personal information
- Born: 3 February 1963 (age 63) Isola della Scala, Italy

Cycling career
- Sport: Cycling
- Role: Rider

Francesco Rossignoli (born 3 February 1963) is a former Italian racing cyclist. He rode in the Tour de France and the Giro d'Italia.
