= Twan Poels =

Dutch cyclist

Toine Poels
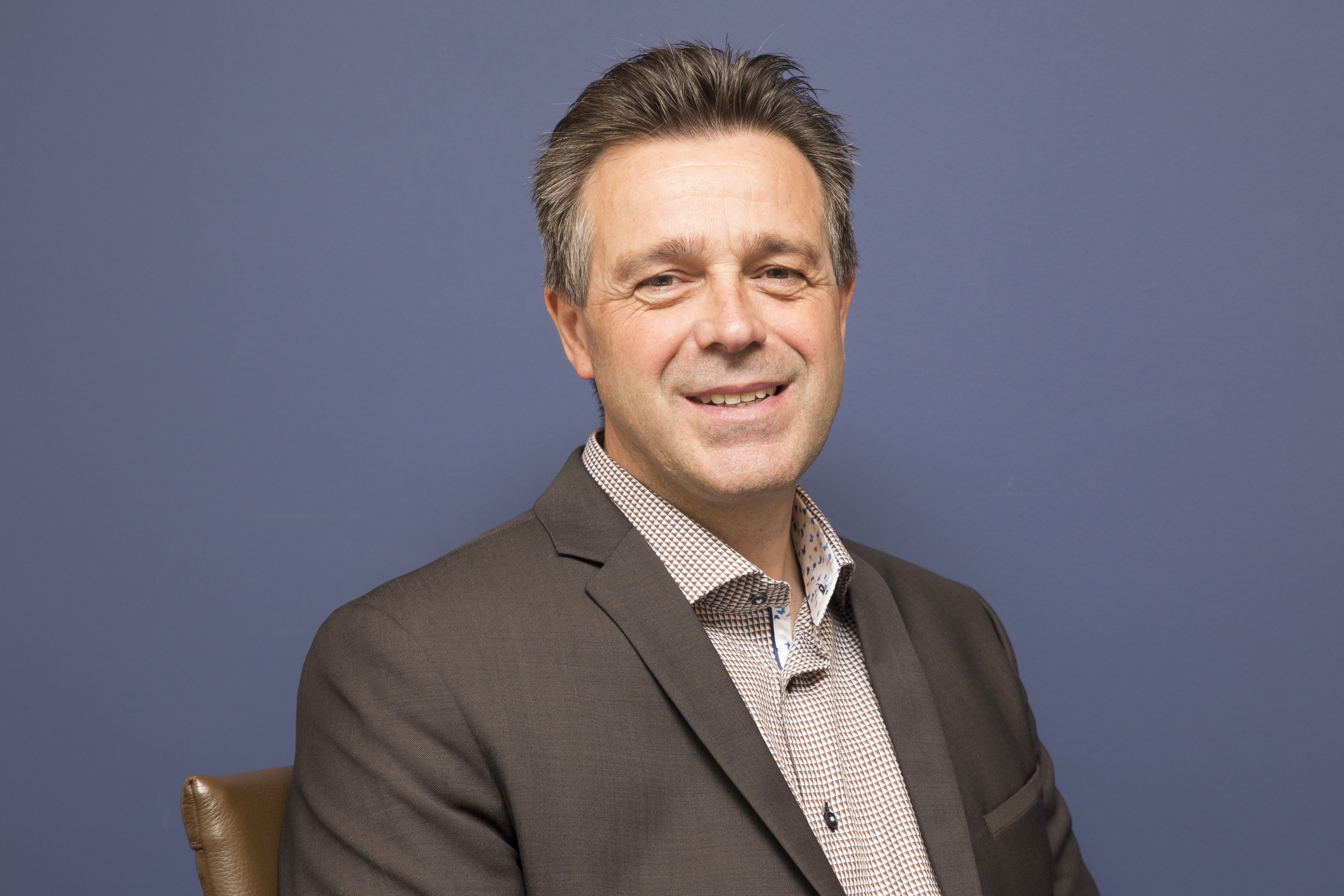
- Twan Poels

Personal information
- Full name: Antonius Johannes Petrus Poels
- Born: 27 July 1963 (age 63) Oeffelt, the Netherlands

Cycling career
- Sport: Cycling
- Current team: Retired
- Discipline: Road
- Role: Rider

Professional team
- 1985-1992: Kwantum–Decosol–Yoko

Antonius Johannes Petrus Poels (born 27 July 1963 in Oeffelt) is a retired Dutch professional cyclist.

In 1984, Poels rode the road race in the 1984 Summer Olympics as a member of the Dutch team, but did not finish.

Poels became a professional cyclist in 1985 for the Kwantum–Decosol–Yoko team. He stayed with this team (that became Superconfex–Kwantum–Yoko–Colnago in 1987 and Buckler–Colnago–Decca in 1990) until he retired in 1992. He rode the Tour de France five times, finishing every time. After his professional career, he became an estate agent.

== See also ==
- List of Dutch Olympic cyclists
