= Henk Boeve =

Dutch cyclist

Personal information
- Born: 28 August 1957 (age 69) Nijverdal, Netherlands

Cycling career
- Sport: Cycling
- Role: Rider
Medal record
Representing Netherlands
Summer Universiade
Silver medal – second place	1983 Edmonton	Road team trial

Henk Boeve (born 28 August 1957) is a Dutch former professional racing cyclist. He rode in the 1986 Tour de France.
