= Dominique Gaigne =

French cyclist

Personal information
- Full name: Dominique Gaigne
- Born: 3 July 1961 (age 65) Pacé France

Cycling career
- Sport: Cycling
- Discipline: Road
- Role: Rider

Major wins
- One stage Tour de France; One stage Vuelta a España

Dominique Gaigne (born 3 July 1961 in Pacé, France) is a former French professional road bicycle racer. He won one stage in the 1983 Tour de France and wore the yellow jersey for one day in the 1986 Tour de France. After retiring from competition he became a builder.

== Major results ==
1983
Le Horps
Vuelta a España:

Winner prologue

Tour de France:

Winner stage 5

1986
Tour du Limousin
Tour de France:

Wearing yellow jersey for one day

1989
Binche - Tournai - Binche
