= Wim Van Eynde =

Belgian cyclist

Personal information
- Full name: Wim Van Eynde
- Born: 24 July 1960 (age 66) Lier, Belgium

Cycling career
- Sport: Cycling
- Role: Rider

Professional teams
- 1983: Jacky Aernoudt–Rossin–Campagnolo
- 1984: Splendor–Jacky Aernoudt Meubelen
- 1985–1991: Lotto
- 1981–1983: Varta - ELK - NÖ
- 1993: La William–Duvel

Wim Van Eynde (born 24 July 1960) is a Belgian former racing cyclist. He rode in four editions of the Tour de France.
