= Marino Polini =

Italian cyclist

Personal information
- Born: 9 March 1959 (age 67) Dalmine, Italy

Cycling career
- Sport: Cycling
- Role: Rider

Marino Polini (born 9 March 1959) is an Italian former professional racing cyclist. He rode in the 1986 Tour de France.
