= List of teams and cyclists in the 1987 Vuelta a España =

For the 1987 Vuelta a España, the field consisted of 179 riders; 88 finished the race.

== By rider ==
Legend
No.	Starting number worn by the rider during the Vuelta
Pos.	Position in the general classification
Time	Deficit to the winner of the general classification
DNF	Denotes a rider who did not finish

No.	Name	Nationality	Team	Pos.	Time	Ref
1	Jesús Cruz Martín	Spain	BH	85	+ 2h 00' 20"	
2	Laudelino Cubino	Spain	BH	DNF	—	
3	Juan-Carlos Rozas Salgado	Spain	BH	37	+ 47' 37"	
4	Philippe Bouvatier	France	BH	38	+ 47' 56"	
5	Manuel Jorge Domínguez	Spain	BH	62	+ 1h 27' 32"	
6	Federico Echave	Spain	BH	17	+ 23' 30"	
7	Anselmo Fuerte	Spain	BH	7	+ 4' 59"	
8	José Luis Navarro	Spain	BH	58	+ 1h 20' 30"	
9	Francisco Rodríguez Maldonado	Colombia	BH	48	+ 58' 29"	
10	Guido Van Calster	Belgium	BH	33	+ 40' 58"	
11	Juan Gomila Alcaraz	Spain	Dormilón	87	+ 2h 09' 16"	
12	Roberto Córdoba Asensi	Spain	Dormilón	DNF	—	
13	José Rafael Garcia Martinez	Spain	Dormilón	74	+ 1h 40' 34"	
14	José Maria Gonzalez Barcala	Spain	Dormilón	49	+ 58' 32"	
15	Aurelio Robles Jiménez	Spain	Dormilón	DNF	—	
16	Jaime Salva Lull	Spain	Dormilón	54	+ 1h 15' 18"	
17	Mariano Sánchez Martinez	Spain	Dormilón	46	+ 58' 18"	
18	Francisco Navarro Fuster	Spain	Dormilón	DNF	—	
19	Luc Suykerbuyk	Netherlands	Dormilón	71	+ 1h 37' 56"	
20	Leo Wellens	Belgium	Dormilón	DNF	—	
21	Miguel Ángel Iglesias	Spain	Frinca–Colchón CR	75	+ 1h 42' 13"	
22	Ricardo Zúñiga Carrasco	Spain	Frinca–Colchón CR	84	+ 1h 59' 50"	
23	Jesús Rodríguez Rodríguez	Spain	Frinca–Colchón CR	DNF	—	
24	Juan Alberto Reig Esteban	Spain	Frinca–Colchón CR	81	+ 1h 56' 15"	
25	Hipolito Verdu Falco	Spain	Frinca–Colchón CR	DNF	—	
26	Joaquim Faura	Spain	Frinca–Colchón CR	DNF	—	
27	Javier Ruiz Frances	Spain	Frinca–Colchón CR	DNF	—	
28	Emilio Garcia	Spain	Frinca–Colchón CR	59	+ 1h 22' 07"	
29	Antonio Provencio Garcia	Spain	Frinca–Colchón CR	DNF	—	
30	José Antonio Borja Valera	Spain	Frinca–Colchón CR	DNF	—	
31	Sean Kelly	Ireland	Kas	DNF	—	
32	Jean-Luc Vandenbroucke	Belgium	Kas	DNF	—	
33	Iñaki Gastón	Spain	Kas	12	+ 8' 49"	
34	Celestino Prieto	Spain	Kas	41	+ 50' 00"	
35	Jesús Montoya	Spain	Kas	67	+ 1h 33' 55"	
36	Alfred Achermann	Switzerland	Kas	DNF	—	
37	Acácio da Silva	Portugal	Kas	DNF	—	
38	Jacques Decrion	France	Kas	DNF	—	
39	Francisco Espinosa	Spain	Kas	78	+ 1h 44' 39"	
40	Luis Javier Lukin	Spain	Kas	52	+ 1h 06' 01"	
41	Vicente Belda	Spain	Kelme	6	+ 4' 40"	
42	José Recio	Spain	Kelme	DNF	—	
43	Antonio Coll	Spain	Kelme	55	+ 1h 16' 38"	
44	José María Moreno Ramírez	Spain	Kelme	DNF	—	
45	Juan Martínez Oliver	Spain	Kelme	DNF	—	
46	Carlos Emiro Gutiérrez	Colombia	Kelme	39	+ 49' 40"	
47	José Alirio Chizabas Torres	Colombia	Kelme	DNF	—	
48	Javier Castellar	Spain	Kelme	60	+ 1h 26' 07"	
49	Joaquim Llach Ramisa	Spain	Kelme	DNF	—	
50	Joaquín Hernández Hernández	Spain	Kelme	82	+ 1h 57' 07"	
51	Pello Ruiz Cabestany	Spain	Caja Rural–Orbea	DNF	—	
52	Marino Lejarreta	Spain	Caja Rural–Orbea	34	+ 42' 21"	
53	Erwin Nijboer	Netherlands	Caja Rural–Orbea	DNF	—	
54	Manuel Murga Sáez De Ormijana	Spain	Caja Rural–Orbea	DNF	—	
55	Jaime Vilamajó	Spain	Caja Rural–Orbea	73	+ 1h 40' 10"	
56	Vicente Ridaura	Spain	Caja Rural–Orbea	DNF	—	
57	José Salvador Sanchis	Spain	Caja Rural–Orbea	61	+ 1h 26' 55"	
58	Antonio Esparza	Spain	Caja Rural–Orbea	DNF	—	
59	Manuel Guijarro Doménech	Spain	Caja Rural–Orbea	63	+ 1h 31' 41"	
60	Roque de la Cruz	Spain	Caja Rural–Orbea	28	+ 35' 02"	
61	Ángel Arroyo	Spain	Reynolds	11	+ 8' 15"	
62	Dominique Arnaud	France	Reynolds	50	+ 1h 02' 09"	
63	Samuel Cabrera	Colombia	Reynolds	44	+ 54' 57"	
64	Marc Gomez	France	Reynolds	DNF	—	
65	Julián Gorospe	Spain	Reynolds	30	+ 39' 18"	
66	Rubén Gorospe	Spain	Reynolds	65	+ 1h 32' 40"	
67	Jesús Hernández Úbeda	Spain	Reynolds	DNF	—	
68	José Fernando Pacheco Sáez	Spain	Reynolds	DNF	—	
69	Miguel Induráin	Spain	Reynolds	DNF	—	
70	José Enrique Carrera	Spain	Reynolds	DNF	—	
71	Jesús Blanco Villar	Spain	Teka	25	+ 31' 07"	
72	Enrique Aja	Spain	Teka	19	+ 24' 36"	
73	Reimund Dietzen	West Germany	Teka	2	+ 1' 04"	
74	Alfonso Gutiérrez	Spain	Teka	88	+ 2h 12' 37"	
75	Eduardo Chozas	Spain	Teka	36	+ 44' 22"	
76	Jesús Rodríguez Magro	Spain	Teka	76	+ 1h 43' 07"	
77	Ángel Camarillo	Spain	Teka	80	+ 1h 50' 50"	
78	Peter Hilse	West Germany	Teka	DNF	—	
79	Ángel Sarrapio	Spain	Teka	DNF	—	
80	Carlos Hernández Bailo	Spain	Teka	23	+ 27' 16"	
81	Juan Fernández Martín	Spain	Zahor	70	+ 1h 36' 00"	
82	Jesús Suárez Cueva	Spain	Zahor	DNF	—	
83	Juan Maria Eguiarte Soleagui	Spain	Zahor	DNF	—	
84	Manuel Carrera Punzón	Spain	Zahor	86	+ 2h 03' 41"	
85	Roberto Torres	Spain	Zahor	68	+ 1h 34' 51"	
86	Juan Tomás Martínez	Spain	Zahor	14	+ 17' 34"	
87	Ángel de las Heras	Spain	Zahor	43	+ 52' 35"	
88	Jesús Ignacio Ibáñez Loyo	Spain	Zahor	66	+ 1h 33' 43"	
89	Santiago Portillo Rosado	Spain	Zahor	35	+ 42' 31"	
90	Jesús Rodriguez Carballido	Spain	Zahor	77	+ 1h 43' 38"	
91	Gregor Braun	West Germany	AD Renting–Fangio–IOC–MBK	DNF	—	
92	Francis Castaing	France	AD Renting–Fangio–IOC–MBK	DNF	—	
93	Robert D'Hont	Belgium	AD Renting–Fangio–IOC–MBK	DNF	—	
94	Dirk Wayenberg	Belgium	AD Renting–Fangio–IOC–MBK	DNF	—	
95	Martin Durant	Belgium	AD Renting–Fangio–IOC–MBK	DNF	—	
96	Matt Eaton	United States	AD Renting–Fangio–IOC–MBK	DNF	—	
97	Philippe Galvez	France	AD Renting–Fangio–IOC–MBK	DNF	—	
98	Eric Salomon	France	AD Renting–Fangio–IOC–MBK	DNF	—	
99	Marco van der Hulst	Netherlands	AD Renting–Fangio–IOC–MBK	DNF	—	
100	Luc Wallays	Belgium	AD Renting–Fangio–IOC–MBK	DNF	—	
101	Laurent Fignon	France	Système U	3	+ 3' 13"	
102	Laurent Biondi	France	Système U	32	+ 40' 11"	
103	Bernard Gavillet	Switzerland	Système U	DNF	—	
104	Éric Guyot	France	Système U	45	+ 57' 39"	
105	Søren Lilholt	Denmark	Système U	51	+ 1h 05' 13"	
106	Yvon Madiot	France	Système U	8	+ 5' 25"	
107	Gérard Rué	France	Système U	DNF	—	
108	Christophe Lavainne	France	Système U	69	+ 1h 35' 01"	
109	Pascal Poisson	France	Système U	15	+ 20' 14"	
110	Jonas Tegström	Sweden	Système U	79	+ 1h 50' 30"	
111	Luis Herrera	Colombia	Café de Colombia–Varta	1	105h 34' 25"	
112	Martín Ramírez	Colombia	Café de Colombia–Varta	18	+ 24' 13"	
113	José Patrocinio Jiménez	Colombia	Café de Colombia–Varta	16	+ 21' 38"	
114	Henry Cárdenas	Colombia	Café de Colombia–Varta	9	+ 7' 08"	
115	Froylan Morales Landazabal	Colombia	Café de Colombia–Varta	DNF	—	
116	Marco Antonio Léon Castro	Colombia	Café de Colombia–Varta	26	+ 31' 41"	
117	Abelardo Rondón	Colombia	Café de Colombia–Varta	DNF	—	
118	Juan Carlos Castillo	Colombia	Café de Colombia–Varta	31	+ 39' 52"	
119	Israel Corredor	Colombia	Café de Colombia–Varta	DNF	—	
120	Argemiro Bohórquez	Colombia	Café de Colombia–Varta	20	+ 25' 54"	
121	Felipe Yáñez	Spain	DYC–Lucas	DNF	—	
122	José del Ramo Núñez	Spain	DYC–Lucas	DNF	—	
123	Ronny Van Holen	Belgium	DYC–Lucas	DNF	—	
124	Noël Segers	Belgium	DYC–Lucas	DNF	—	
125	Bjarne Riis	Denmark	DYC–Lucas	DNF	—	
126	Patrick Deneut	Belgium	DYC–Lucas	DNF	—	
127	Guido Verdeyen	Belgium	DYC–Lucas	DNF	—	
128	Leon Nevels	Netherlands	DYC–Lucas	DNF	—	
129	Steen Michael Petersen	Denmark	DYC–Lucas	DNF	—	
130	Werner Devos	Belgium	DYC–Lucas	DNF	—	
131	Martin Earley	Ireland	Fagor–Larios	22	+ 27' 15"	
132	Bernard Richard	France	Fagor–Larios	DNF	—	
133	François Lemarchand	France	Fagor–Larios	40	+ 49' 55"	
134	Johnny Weltz	Denmark	Fagor–Larios	42	+ 51' 10"	
135	Pol Verschuere	Belgium	Fagor–Larios	DNF	—	
136	Karl Maxon	United States	Fagor–Larios	DNF	—	
137	Henri Abadie	France	Fagor–Larios	47	+ 58' 22"	
138	Gaxento Oñaederra	Spain	Fagor–Larios	DNF	—	
139	Jean-Jacques Philipp	France	Fagor–Larios	DNF	—	
140	Claude Séguy	France	Fagor–Larios	57	+ 1h 18' 02"	
141	Moreno Argentin	Italy	Gewiss–Bianchi	DNF	—	
142	Emanuele Bombini	Italy	Gewiss–Bianchi	DNF	—	
143	Stefan Brykt	Sweden	Gewiss–Bianchi	DNF	—	
144	Tullio Cortinovis	Italy	Gewiss–Bianchi	DNF	—	
145	Dario Mariuzzo	Italy	Gewiss–Bianchi	DNF	—	
146	Silvio Martinello	Italy	Gewiss–Bianchi	DNF	—	
147	Roberto Pagnin	Italy	Gewiss–Bianchi	DNF	—	
148	Renato Piccolo	Italy	Gewiss–Bianchi	DNF	—	
149	Paolo Rosola	Italy	Gewiss–Bianchi	DNF	—	
150	Arno Küttel	Switzerland	Gewiss–Bianchi	DNF	—	
151	Wim Arras	Belgium	PDM–Ultima–Concorde	DNF	—	
152	René Beuker	Netherlands	PDM–Ultima–Concorde	DNF	—	
153	Henk Boeve	Netherlands	PDM–Ultima–Concorde	DNF	—	
154	Pedro Delgado	Spain	PDM–Ultima–Concorde	4	+ 3' 52"	
155	José Luis Laguía	Spain	PDM–Ultima–Concorde	29	+ 35' 40"	
156	Jörg Müller	Switzerland	PDM–Ultima–Concorde	DNF	—	
157	Marc van Orsouw	Netherlands	PDM–Ultima–Concorde	72	+ 1h 38' 48"	
158	Henri Manders	Netherlands	PDM–Ultima–Concorde	DNF	—	
159	Gert-Jan Theunisse	Netherlands	PDM–Ultima–Concorde	DNF	—	
160	Peter Hoondert	Netherlands	PDM–Ultima–Concorde	DNF	—	
161	Omar Hernández	Colombia	Postobón–Manzana–Ryalcao	10	+ 7' 33"	
162	Óscar de Jesús Vargas	Colombia	Postobón–Manzana–Ryalcao	5	+ 4' 03"	
163	Pablo Wilches	Colombia	Postobón–Manzana–Ryalcao	24	+ 30' 21"	
164	Pedro Saúl Morales	Colombia	Postobón–Manzana–Ryalcao	13	+ 13' 51"	
165	Néstor Mora	Colombia	Postobón–Manzana–Ryalcao	21	+ 26' 35"	
166	Carlos Jaramillo	Colombia	Postobón–Manzana–Ryalcao	53	+ 1h 07' 43"	
167	Segundo Leopoldo Chaparro Cardoso	Colombia	Postobón–Manzana–Ryalcao	DNF	—	
168	Héctor Julio Patarroyo	Colombia	Postobón–Manzana–Ryalcao	56	+ 1h 16' 40"	
169	Luis Fernando Mosquera Restredo	Colombia	Postobón–Manzana–Ryalcao	DNF	—	
170	Gerardo Moncada	Colombia	Postobón–Manzana–Ryalcao	27	+ 33' 15"	
171	Marco Chagas	Portugal	Sporting–Vitalis	DNF	—	
172	Jose Antonio Xavier Guimares Viera	Portugal	Sporting–Vitalis	DNF	—	
173	Jacinto Paulinho Coelho	Portugal	Sporting–Vitalis	64	+ 1h 32' 37"	
174	Joaquim Gomes	Portugal	Sporting–Vitalis	DNF	—	
175	Serafim Vieira da Araújo	Portugal	Sporting–Vitalis	83	+ 1h 57' 35"	
176	Vitor Paulo Rodrigues Gomes	Portugal	Sporting–Vitalis	DNF	—	
178	Adelino Teixeira	Portugal	Sporting–Vitalis	DNF	—	
179	Luis Fernando Domingos Gabirro	Portugal	Sporting–Vitalis	DNF	—	
180	Manuel Zeferino	Portugal	Sporting–Vitalis	DNF	—	
