= 1987 Vuelta a España, Stage 12 to Stage 22 =

Cycling race stages

The 1987 Vuelta a España was the 42nd edition of the Vuelta a España, one of cycling's Grand Tours. The Vuelta began in Benidorm, with a prologue individual time trial on 23 April, and Stage 12 occurred on 5 May with a stage from Cangas de Onís. The race finished in Madrid on 15 May.

== Stage 12 ==
5 May 1987 — Cangas de Onís to Oviedo, 142 km (88 mi)

Stage 12 result

Rank	Rider	Team	Time
1	Carlos Hernández Bailo (ESP)	Teka	3h 34' 18"
2	Christophe Lavainne (FRA)	Système U	+ 13"
3	Pascal Poisson (FRA)	Système U	s.t.
4	Moreno Argentin (ITA)	Gewiss–Bianchi	+ 19"
5	José Maria Gonzalez Barcala (ESP)	Dormilón	s.t.
6	Sean Kelly (IRL)	Kas	+ 21"
7	Alfonso Gutiérrez (ESP)	Teka	s.t.
8	Javier Castellar (ESP)	Kelme	s.t.
9	Martin Earley (IRL)	Fagor–MBK	s.t.
10	José Salvador Sanchis (ESP)	Caja Rural–Orbea	s.t.

General classification after Stage 12

Rank	Rider	Team	Time
1	Luis Herrera (COL)	Café de Colombia–Varta	58h 15' 07"
2	Sean Kelly (IRL)	Kas	+ 39"
3	Reimund Dietzen (FRG)	Teka	+ 50"
4	Óscar Vargas (COL)	Postobón–Manzana–Ryalcao	+ 2' 07"
5	Vicente Belda (ESP)	Kelme	+ 2' 37"
6	Pedro Delgado (ESP)	PDM–Ultima–Concorde	+ 2' 49"
7	Laudelino Cubino (ESP)	BH	+ 3' 37"
8	Anselmo Fuerte (ESP)	BH	+ 3' 57"
9	Yvon Madiot (FRA)	Système U	+ 4' 27"
10	Ángel Arroyo (ESP)	Reynolds	+ 5' 10"

== Stage 13 ==
6 May 1987 — Luarca to Ferrol, 223 km (139 mi)

Stage 13 result

Rank	Rider	Team	Time
1	Carlos Emiro Gutiérrez (COL)	Kelme	5h 58' 33"
2	José Rafael Garcia Martinez (ESP)	Dormilón	+ 1' 10"
3	Ricardo Zúñiga Carrasco (ESP)	Frinca-Colchón CR	s.t.
4	Jesús Blanco Villar (ESP)	Teka	+ 3' 57"
5	Jacinto Paulinho Coelho (POR)	Sporting–Vitalis	s.t.
6	Federico Echave (ESP)	BH	s.t.
7	Pedro Saúl Morales (COL)	Postobón–Manzana–Ryalcao	s.t.
8	Laurent Fignon (FRA)	Système U	+ 4' 00"
9	Alfonso Gutiérrez (ESP)	Teka	+ 5' 04"
10	Antonio Esparza (ESP)	Caja Rural–Orbea	s.t.

General classification after Stage 13

Rank	Rider	Team	Time
1	Luis Herrera (COL)	Café de Colombia–Varta	64h 18' 44"
2	Sean Kelly (IRL)	Kas	+ 39"
3	Reimund Dietzen (FRG)	Teka	+ 50"
4	Óscar Vargas (COL)	Postobón–Manzana–Ryalcao	+ 2' 07"
5	Vicente Belda (ESP)	Kelme	+ 2' 37"
6	Pedro Delgado (ESP)	PDM–Ultima–Concorde	+ 2' 49"
7	Laudelino Cubino (ESP)	BH	+ 3' 37"
8	Anselmo Fuerte (ESP)	BH	+ 3' 57"
9	Yvon Madiot (FRA)	Système U	+ 4' 27"
10	Laurent Fignon (FRA)	Système U	+ 4' 55"

== Stage 14 ==
7 May 1987 — Ferrol to A Coruña, 220 km (140 mi)

Stage 14 result

Rank	Rider	Team	Time
1	Juan Fernández Martín (ESP)	Zahor Chocolates	3h 55' 42"
2	René Beuker (NED)	PDM–Ultima–Concorde	s.t.
3	Roberto Pagnin (ITA)	Gewiss–Bianchi	+ 5' 58"
4	Éric Guyot (FRA)	Système U	s.t.
5	José Enrique Carrera (ESP)	Reynolds	+ 6' 24"
6	Sean Kelly (IRL)	Kas	+ 6' 25"
7	Johnny Weltz (DEN)	Fagor–MBK	s.t.
8	Miguel Ángel Iglesias (ESP)	Frinca-Colchón CR	s.t.
9	Alfonso Gutiérrez (ESP)	Teka	s.t.
10	Antonio Esparza (ESP)	Caja Rural–Orbea	s.t.

General classification after Stage 14

Rank	Rider	Team	Time
1	Luis Herrera (COL)	Café de Colombia–Varta	68h 20' 51"
2	Sean Kelly (IRL)	Kas	+ 39"
3	Reimund Dietzen (FRG)	Teka	+ 50"
4	Óscar Vargas (COL)	Postobón–Manzana–Ryalcao	+ 2' 07"
5	Vicente Belda (ESP)	Kelme	+ 2' 37"
6	Pedro Delgado (ESP)	PDM–Ultima–Concorde	+ 2' 49"
7	Laudelino Cubino (ESP)	BH	+ 3' 37"
8	Anselmo Fuerte (ESP)	BH	+ 3' 57"
9	Yvon Madiot (FRA)	Système U	+ 4' 27"
10	Laurent Fignon (FRA)	Système U	+ 4' 55"

== Stage 15 ==
8 May 1987 — A Coruña to Vigo, 185 km (115 mi)

Stage 15 result

Rank	Rider	Team	Time
1	Antonio Esparza (ESP)	Caja Rural–Orbea	4h 57' 31"
2	Alfonso Gutiérrez (ESP)	Teka	+ 3' 44"
3	Sean Kelly (IRL)	Kas	s.t.
4	Miguel Ángel Iglesias (ESP)	Frinca-Colchón CR	s.t.
5	Roberto Pagnin (ITA)	Gewiss–Bianchi	s.t.
6	José Luis Laguía (ESP)	PDM–Ultima–Concorde	s.t.
7	Laurent Biondi (FRA)	Système U	s.t.
8	Søren Lilholt (DEN)	Système U	s.t.
9	Federico Echave (ESP)	BH	s.t.
10	Johnny Weltz (DEN)	Fagor–MBK	s.t.

General classification after Stage 15

Rank	Rider	Team	Time
1	Luis Herrera (COL)	Café de Colombia–Varta	73h 22' 06"
2	Sean Kelly (IRL)	Kas	+ 39"
3	Reimund Dietzen (FRG)	Teka	+ 50"
4	Óscar Vargas (COL)	Postobón–Manzana–Ryalcao	+ 2' 07"
5	Vicente Belda (ESP)	Kelme	+ 2' 37"
6	Pedro Delgado (ESP)	PDM–Ultima–Concorde	+ 2' 49"
7	Laudelino Cubino (ESP)	BH	+ 3' 37"
8	Anselmo Fuerte (ESP)	BH	+ 3' 57"
9	Yvon Madiot (FRA)	Système U	+ 4' 27"
10	Laurent Fignon (FRA)	Système U	+ 4' 48"

== Stage 16 ==
9 May 1987 — Ponteareas to Ponferrada, 237 km (147 mi)

Stage 16 result

Rank	Rider	Team	Time
1	Dominique Arnaud (FRA)	Reynolds	6h 25' 58"
2	Henri Abadie (FRA)	Fagor–MBK	+ 1' 16"
3	Santiago Portillo Rosado (ESP)	Zahor Chocolates	s.t.
4	Pello Ruiz Cabestany (ESP)	Caja Rural–Orbea	+ 8' 59"
5	Roberto Córdoba Asensi (ESP)	Dormilón	s.t.
6	Néstor Mora (COL)	Postobón–Manzana–Ryalcao	s.t.
7	René Beuker (NED)	PDM–Ultima–Concorde	+ 9' 23"
8	Miguel Ángel Iglesias (ESP)	Frinca-Colchón CR	s.t.
9	Henri Manders (NED)	PDM–Ultima–Concorde	s.t.
10	Pedro Delgado (ESP)	PDM–Ultima–Concorde	s.t.

General classification after Stage 16

Rank	Rider	Team	Time
1	Luis Herrera (COL)	Café de Colombia–Varta	79h 57' 27"
2	Sean Kelly (IRL)	Kas	+ 39"
3	Reimund Dietzen (FRG)	Teka	+ 50"
4	Óscar Vargas (COL)	Postobón–Manzana–Ryalcao	+ 2' 07"
5	Vicente Belda (ESP)	Kelme	+ 2' 37"
6	Pedro Delgado (ESP)	PDM–Ultima–Concorde	+ 2' 49"
7	Laudelino Cubino (ESP)	BH	+ 3' 37"
8	Anselmo Fuerte (ESP)	BH	+ 3' 57"
9	Yvon Madiot (FRA)	Système U	+ 4' 27"
10	Laurent Fignon (FRA)	Système U	+ 4' 48"

== Stage 17 ==
10 May 1987 — Ponferrada to Valladolid, 221 km (137 mi)

Stage 17 result

Rank	Rider	Team	Time
1	Roberto Pagnin (ITA)	Gewiss–Bianchi	4h 51' 05"
2	Francisco Navarro Fuster (ESP)	Dormilón	+ 31"
3	René Beuker (NED)	PDM–Ultima–Concorde	s.t.
4	Jaime Vilamajó (ESP)	Caja Rural–Orbea	+ 10' 24"
5	Henri Manders (NED)	PDM–Ultima–Concorde	s.t.
6	Reimund Dietzen (FRG)	Teka	s.t.
7	Serafin Vieira De Araujo (POR)	Sporting–Vitalis	s.t.
8	Søren Lilholt (DEN)	Système U	s.t.
9	Javier Castellar (ESP)	Kelme	s.t.
10	Sean Kelly (IRL)	Kas	s.t.

General classification after Stage 17

Rank	Rider	Team	Time
1	Luis Herrera (COL)	Café de Colombia–Varta	84h 58' 56"
2	Sean Kelly (IRL)	Kas	+ 39"
3	Reimund Dietzen (FRG)	Teka	+ 50"
4	Óscar Vargas (COL)	Postobón–Manzana–Ryalcao	+ 2' 07"
5	Vicente Belda (ESP)	Kelme	+ 2' 37"
6	Pedro Delgado (ESP)	PDM–Ultima–Concorde	+ 2' 49"
7	Laudelino Cubino (ESP)	BH	+ 3' 37"
8	Anselmo Fuerte (ESP)	BH	+ 3' 57"
9	Yvon Madiot (FRA)	Système U	+ 4' 27"
10	Laurent Fignon (FRA)	Système U	+ 4' 48"

== Stage 18 ==
11 May 1987 — Valladolid to Valladolid, 24 km (15 mi) (ITT)

Stage 18 result

Rank	Rider	Team	Time
1	Jesús Blanco Villar (ESP)	Teka	29' 24.5"
2	Sean Kelly (IRL)	Kas	+ 11.3"
3	Pascal Poisson (FRA)	Système U	+ 15.69"
4	Pello Ruiz Cabestany (ESP)	Caja Rural–Orbea	+ 19.47"
5	Julián Gorospe (ESP)	Reynolds	+ 33.3"
6	Federico Echave (ESP)	BH	+ 48.72"
7	Reimund Dietzen (FRG)	Teka	+ 51.86"
8	Guido Van Calster (BEL)	BH	+ 53.01"
9	Roberto Córdoba Asensi (ESP)	Dormilón	+ 58.41"
10	Carlos Hernández Bailo (ESP)	Teka	+ 1' 05.54"

General classification after Stage 18

Rank	Rider	Team	Time
1	Sean Kelly (IRL)	Kas	85h 29' 10"
2	Luis Herrera (COL)	Café de Colombia–Varta	+ 42"
3	Reimund Dietzen (FRG)	Teka	+ 52"
4	Pedro Delgado (ESP)	PDM–Ultima–Concorde	+ 3' 39"
5	Óscar Vargas (COL)	Postobón–Manzana–Ryalcao	s.t.
6	Vicente Belda (ESP)	Kelme	+ 4' 22"
7	Laudelino Cubino (ESP)	BH	+ 4' 42"
8	Jesús Blanco Villar (ESP)	Teka	+ 4' 46"
9	Anselmo Fuerte (ESP)	BH	+ 4' 47"
10	Yvon Madiot (FRA)	Système U	+ 5' 07"

== Stage 19 ==
12 May 1987 — El Barco de Ávila to Ávila, 213 km (132 mi)

Stage 19 result

Rank	Rider	Team	Time
1	Laurent Fignon (FRA)	Système U	5h 47' 25"
2	Luis Herrera (COL)	Café de Colombia–Varta	+ 1' 10"
3	Pascal Poisson (FRA)	Système U	s.t.
4	Yvon Madiot (FRA)	Système U	s.t.
5	Omar Hernández (COL)	Postobón–Manzana–Ryalcao	s.t.
6	Roberto Córdoba Asensi (ESP)	Dormilón	s.t.
7	Óscar Vargas (COL)	Postobón–Manzana–Ryalcao	s.t.
8	Pedro Delgado (ESP)	PDM–Ultima–Concorde	s.t.
9	Reimund Dietzen (FRG)	Teka	s.t.
10	Henry Cárdenas (COL)	Café de Colombia–Varta	s.t.

General classification after Stage 19

Rank	Rider	Team	Time
1	Luis Herrera (COL)	Café de Colombia–Varta	91h 18' 25"
2	Reimund Dietzen (FRG)	Teka	+ 1' 04"
3	Laurent Fignon (FRA)	Système U	+ 3' 22"
4	Pedro Delgado (ESP)	PDM–Ultima–Concorde	+ 3' 54"
5	Óscar Vargas (COL)	Postobón–Manzana–Ryalcao	+ 3' 57"
6	Vicente Belda (ESP)	Kelme	+ 4' 40"
7	Laudelino Cubino (ESP)	BH	+ 5' 00"
8	Anselmo Fuerte (ESP)	BH	+ 5' 01"
9	Yvon Madiot (FRA)	Système U	+ 5' 25"
10	Henry Cárdenas (COL)	Café de Colombia–Varta	+ 7' 02"

== Stage 20 ==
13 May 1987 — Ávila to Palazuelos de Eresma (Destilerías DYC), 183 km (114 mi)

Stage 20 result

Rank	Rider	Team	Time
1	Omar Hernández (COL)	Postobón–Manzana–Ryalcao	5h 10' 54"
2	Reimund Dietzen (FRG)	Teka	+ 1' 40"
3	Søren Lilholt (DEN)	Système U	s.t.
4	Iñaki Gastón (ESP)	Kas	s.t.
5	Pedro Delgado (ESP)	PDM–Ultima–Concorde	s.t.
6	Laurent Fignon (FRA)	Système U	s.t.
7	Ángel Arroyo (ESP)	Reynolds	s.t.
8	Anselmo Fuerte (ESP)	BH	s.t.
9	Yvon Madiot (FRA)	Système U	s.t.
10	Guido Van Calster (BEL)	BH	s.t.

General classification after Stage 20

Rank	Rider	Team	Time
1	Luis Herrera (COL)	Café de Colombia–Varta	96h 30' 59"
2	Reimund Dietzen (FRG)	Teka	+ 1' 04"
3	Laurent Fignon (FRA)	Système U	+ 3' 20"
4	Pedro Delgado (ESP)	PDM–Ultima–Concorde	+ 3' 54"
5	Óscar Vargas (COL)	Postobón–Manzana–Ryalcao	+ 4' 03"
6	Vicente Belda (ESP)	Kelme	+ 4' 40"
7	Anselmo Fuerte (ESP)	BH	+ 4' 59"
8	Laudelino Cubino (ESP)	BH	+ 5' 00"
9	Yvon Madiot (FRA)	Système U	+ 5' 25"
10	Henry Cárdenas (COL)	Café de Colombia–Varta	+ 7' 08"

== Stage 21 ==
14 May 1987 — Palazuelos de Eresma (Destilerías DYC) to Collado Villalba, 160 km (99 mi)

Stage 21 result

Rank	Rider	Team	Time
1	Francisco Rodríguez Maldonado (COL)	BH	4h 18' 03"
2	Pascal Poisson (FRA)	Système U	+ 4' 12"
3	Guido Van Calster (BEL)	BH	s.t.
4	Enrique Aja (ESP)	Teka	s.t.
5	Roberto Córdoba Asensi (ESP)	Dormilón	s.t.
6	Laurent Biondi (FRA)	Système U	s.t.
7	Reimund Dietzen (FRG)	Teka	s.t.
8	Laurent Fignon (FRA)	Système U	s.t.
9	Martin Earley (IRL)	Fagor–MBK	s.t.
10	Celestino Prieto (ESP)	Kas	s.t.

General classification after Stage 21

Rank	Rider	Team	Time
1	Luis Herrera (COL)	Café de Colombia–Varta	100h 05' 31"
2	Reimund Dietzen (FRG)	Teka	+ 1' 04"
3	Laurent Fignon (FRA)	Système U	+ 3' 17"
4	Pedro Delgado (ESP)	PDM–Ultima–Concorde	+ 3' 52"
5	Óscar Vargas (COL)	Postobón–Manzana–Ryalcao	+ 4' 03"
6	Vicente Belda (ESP)	Kelme	+ 4' 40"
7	Anselmo Fuerte (ESP)	BH	+ 4' 59"
8	Yvon Madiot (FRA)	Système U	+ 5' 25"
9	Henry Cárdenas (COL)	Café de Colombia–Varta	+ 7' 08"
10	Omar Hernández (COL)	Postobón–Manzana–Ryalcao	+ 7' 33"

== Stage 22 ==
15 May 1987 — Alcalá de Henares to Madrid, 173 km (107 mi)

Stage 22 result

Rank	Rider	Team	Time
1	Jaime Vilamajó (ESP)	Caja Rural–Orbea	4h 41' 10"
2	Manuel Jorge Domínguez (ESP)	BH	+ 1"
3	Alfonso Gutiérrez (ESP)	Teka	s.t.
4	Miguel Ángel Iglesias (ESP)	Frinca-Colchón CR	s.t.
5	Søren Lilholt (DEN)	Système U	s.t.
6	Guido Van Calster (BEL)	BH	s.t.
7	Laurent Biondi (FRA)	Système U	s.t.
8	Juan Fernández Martín (ESP)	Zahor Chocolates	s.t.
9	Jesús Blanco Villar (ESP)	Teka	s.t.
10	Johnny Weltz (DEN)	Fagor–MBK	s.t.

General classification after Stage 22

Rank	Rider	Team	Time
1	Luis Herrera (COL)	Café de Colombia–Varta	105h 34' 25"
2	Reimund Dietzen (FRG)	Teka	+ 1' 04"
3	Laurent Fignon (FRA)	Système U	+ 3' 13"
4	Pedro Delgado (ESP)	PDM–Ultima–Concorde	+ 3' 52"
5	Óscar Vargas (COL)	Postobón–Manzana–Ryalcao	+ 4' 03"
6	Vicente Belda (ESP)	Kelme	+ 4' 40"
7	Anselmo Fuerte (ESP)	BH	+ 4' 59"
8	Yvon Madiot (FRA)	Système U	+ 5' 25"
9	Henry Cárdenas (COL)	Café de Colombia–Varta	+ 7' 08"
10	Omar Hernández (COL)	Postobón–Manzana–Ryalcao	+ 7' 33"
