= 1987 Vuelta a España, Prologue to Stage 11 =

Cycling race stages

The 1987 Vuelta a España was the 42nd edition of the Vuelta a España, one of cycling's Grand Tours. The Vuelta began in Benidorm, with a prologue individual time trial on 23 April, and Stage 11 occurred on 4 May with a stage to the Lakes of Covadonga. The race finished in Madrid on 14 May.

== Prologue ==
23 April 1987 — Benidorm to Benidorm, 6.6 km (4.1 mi) (ITT)

Prologue result and general classification after Prologue

Rank	Rider	Team	Time
1	Jean-Luc Vandenbroucke (BEL)	Kas	8' 09"
2	Sean Kelly (IRL)	Kas	+ 6"
3	Jesús Blanco Villar (ESP)	Teka	+ 9"
4	Alfred Achermann (SUI)	Kas	+ 15"
5	Federico Echave (ESP)	BH	+ 16"
6	Philippe Bouvatier (FRA)	BH	+ 17"
7	Pello Ruiz Cabestany (ESP)	Caja Rural–Orbea	+ 19"
8	Marc Gomez (FRA)	Reynolds	+ 20"
9	Jesús Montoya (ESP)	Kas	s.t.
10	Samuel Cabrera (COL)	Reynolds	+ 21"

== Stage 1 ==
24 April 1987 — Benidorm to Albacete, 219 km (136 mi)

Stage 1 result

Rank	Rider	Team	Time
1	Sean Kelly (IRL)	Kas	5h 49' 56"
2	Alfonso Gutiérrez (ESP)	Teka	s.t.
3	Manuel Jorge Domínguez (ESP)	BH	s.t.
4	Wim Arras (BEL)	PDM–Ultima–Concorde	s.t.
5	Paolo Rosola (ITA)	Gewiss–Bianchi	s.t.
6	Werner Devos (BEL)	DYC-Lucas	s.t.
7	Roberto Pagnin (ITA)	Gewiss–Bianchi	s.t.
8	Jesús Suárez Cueva (ESP)	Zahor Chocolates	s.t.
9	Patrick Deneut (BEL)	DYC-Lucas	s.t.
10	Manuel Murga Saez De Ormijana (ESP)	Caja Rural–Orbea	s.t.

General classification after Stage 1

Rank	Rider	Team	Time
1	Sean Kelly (IRL)	Kas	5h 58' 05"
2	Jean-Luc Vandenbroucke (BEL)	Kas	s.t.
3	Jesús Blanco Villar (ESP)	Teka	+ 10"
4	José Enrique Carrera (ESP)	Reynolds	+ 12"
5	Pello Ruiz Cabestany (ESP)	Caja Rural–Orbea	s.t.
6	Federico Echave (ESP)	BH	+ 17"
7	Philippe Bouvatier (FRA)	BH	+ 18"
8	Marc Gomez (FRA)	Reynolds	+ 21"
9	José Recio (ESP)	Kelme	+ 22"
10	Roberto Pagnin (ITA)	Gewiss–Bianchi	+ 23"

== Stage 2 ==
25 April 1987 — Albacete to Valencia, 217 km (135 mi)

Stage 2 result

Rank	Rider	Team	Time
1	Paolo Rosola (ITA)	Gewiss–Bianchi	5h 20' 15"
2	Sean Kelly (IRL)	Kas	s.t.
3	Wim Arras (BEL)	PDM–Ultima–Concorde	s.t.
4	Werner Devos (BEL)	DYC-Lucas	s.t.
5	Alfonso Gutiérrez (ESP)	Teka	s.t.
6	Antonio Esparza (ESP)	Caja Rural–Orbea	s.t.
7	Manuel Jorge Domínguez (ESP)	BH	s.t.
8	Joaquín Hernández Hernández (ESP)	Kelme	s.t.
9	Francis Castaing (FRA)	AD Renting–Fangio–IOC–MBK	s.t.
10	José Recio (ESP)	Kelme	s.t.

General classification after Stage 2

Rank	Rider	Team	Time
1	Roberto Pagnin (ITA)	Gewiss–Bianchi	11h 18' 15"
2	Sean Kelly (IRL)	Kas	+ 5"
3	Jean-Luc Vandenbroucke (BEL)	Kas	s.t.
4	Jesús Blanco Villar (ESP)	Teka	+ 15"
5	Pello Ruiz Cabestany (ESP)	Caja Rural–Orbea	+ 17"
6	Federico Echave (ESP)	BH	+ 22"
7	Philippe Bouvatier (FRA)	BH	+ 23"
8	Marc Gomez (FRA)	Reynolds	+ 26"
9	José Recio (ESP)	Kelme	+ 27"
10	Pascal Poisson (FRA)	Système U	+ 28"

== Stage 3 ==
26 April 1987 — Valencia to Valencia, 34.8 km (21.6 mi) (ITT)

Stage 3 result

Rank	Rider	Team	Time
1	Sean Kelly (IRL)	Kas	44' 51"
2	Jesús Blanco Villar (ESP)	Teka	+ 19"
3	Pello Ruiz Cabestany (ESP)	Caja Rural–Orbea	+ 22"
4	Reimund Dietzen (FRG)	Teka	+ 33"
5	Pascal Poisson (FRA)	Système U	+ 35"
6	Julián Gorospe (ESP)	Reynolds	+ 37"
7	Jean-Luc Vandenbroucke (BEL)	Kas	+ 46"
8	Karl Maxon (USA)	Fagor–MBK	+ 1' 03"
9	Iñaki Gastón (ESP)	Kas	+ 1' 07"
10	Federico Echave (ESP)	BH	+ 1' 12"

General classification after Stage 3

Rank	Rider	Team	Time
1	Sean Kelly (IRL)	Kas	12h 03' 11"
2	Jesús Blanco Villar (ESP)	Teka	+ 29"
3	Pello Ruiz Cabestany (ESP)	Caja Rural–Orbea	+ 34"
4	Jean-Luc Vandenbroucke (BEL)	Kas	+ 46"
5	Pascal Poisson (FRA)	Système U	+ 58"
6	Julián Gorospe (ESP)	Reynolds	+ 1' 05"
7	Reimund Dietzen (FRG)	Teka	+ 1' 16"
8	Federico Echave (ESP)	BH	+ 1' 29"
9	Philippe Bouvatier (FRA)	BH	+ 1' 37"
10	Iñaki Gastón (ESP)	Kas	+ 1' 40"

== Stage 4 ==
27 April 1987 — Valencia to Villarreal, 169 km (105 mi)

Stage 4 result

Rank	Rider	Team	Time
1	Alfonso Gutiérrez (ESP)	Teka	4h 30' 32"
2	Werner Devos (BEL)	DYC-Lucas	s.t.
3	Manuel Jorge Domínguez (ESP)	BH	s.t.
4	Paolo Rosola (ITA)	Gewiss–Bianchi	s.t.
5	Jean-Jacques Philipp (FRA)	Fagor–MBK	s.t.
6	Antonio Esparza (ESP)	Caja Rural–Orbea	s.t.
7	Patrick Deneut (BEL)	DYC-Lucas	s.t.
8	Jesús Suárez Cueva (ESP)	Zahor Chocolates	s.t.
9	Yvon Madiot (FRA)	Système U	s.t.
10	Sean Kelly (IRL)	Kas	s.t.

General classification after Stage 4

Rank	Rider	Team	Time
1	Sean Kelly (IRL)	Kas	16h 33' 43"
2	Jesús Blanco Villar (ESP)	Teka	+ 29"
3	Pello Ruiz Cabestany (ESP)	Caja Rural–Orbea	+ 34"
4	Pascal Poisson (FRA)	Système U	+ 58"
5	Julián Gorospe (ESP)	Reynolds	+ 1' 05"
6	Reimund Dietzen (FRG)	Teka	+ 1' 16"
7	Federico Echave (ESP)	BH	+ 1' 29"
8	Philippe Bouvatier (FRA)	BH	+ 1' 37"
9	Iñaki Gastón (ESP)	Kas	+ 1' 40"
10	Miguel Induráin (ESP)	Reynolds	+ 1' 57"

== Stage 5 ==
28 April 1987 — Salou to Barcelona, 165 km (103 mi)

Stage 5 result

Rank	Rider	Team	Time
1	Roberto Pagnin (ITA)	Gewiss–Bianchi	4h 37' 16"
2	Henri Abadie (FRA)	Fagor–MBK	s.t.
3	Pello Ruiz Cabestany (ESP)	Caja Rural–Orbea	s.t.
4	José Recio (ESP)	Kelme	s.t.
5	Sean Kelly (IRL)	Kas	s.t.
6	Iñaki Gastón (ESP)	Kas	s.t.
7	Manuel Jorge Domínguez (ESP)	BH	s.t.
8	Martin Earley (IRL)	Fagor–MBK	s.t.
9	Emanuele Bombini (ITA)	Gewiss–Bianchi	s.t.
10	José Luis Laguía (ESP)	PDM–Ultima–Concorde	s.t.

General classification after Stage 5

Rank	Rider	Team	Time
1	Roberto Pagnin (ITA)	Gewiss–Bianchi	21h 13' 52"
2	Sean Kelly (IRL)	Kas	+ 7"
3	Jesús Blanco Villar (ESP)	Teka	+ 36"
4	Pello Ruiz Cabestany (ESP)	Caja Rural–Orbea	+ 41"
5	Pascal Poisson (FRA)	Système U	+ 1' 05"
6	Julián Gorospe (ESP)	Reynolds	+ 1' 12"
7	Reimund Dietzen (FRG)	Teka	+ 1' 23"
8	Federico Echave (ESP)	BH	+ 1' 36"
9	Philippe Bouvatier (FRA)	BH	+ 1' 44"
10	Iñaki Gastón (ESP)	Kas	+ 1' 47"

== Stage 6 ==
29 April 1987 — Barcelona to Grau Roig, 220 km (140 mi)

Stage 6 result

Rank	Rider	Team	Time
1	Jesús Ignacio Ibáñez Loyo (ESP)	Zahor Chocolates	5h 57' 34"
2	Vicente Belda (ESP)	Kelme	+ 2' 02"
3	Luis Herrera (COL)	Café de Colombia–Varta	+ 2' 03"
4	Laudelino Cubino (ESP)	BH	+ 2' 20"
5	Henry Cárdenas (COL)	Café de Colombia–Varta	s.t.
6	Ángel Arroyo (ESP)	Reynolds	+ 2' 21"
7	Óscar Vargas (COL)	Postobón–Manzana–Ryalcao	+ 2' 22"
8	Pedro Delgado (ESP)	PDM–Ultima–Concorde	+ 2' 24"
9	Martín Ramírez (COL)	Café de Colombia–Varta	+ 2' 38"
10	Israel Corredor (COL)	Café de Colombia–Varta	+ 2' 42"

General classification after Stage 6

Rank	Rider	Team	Time
1	Sean Kelly (IRL)	Kas	27h 14' 37"
2	Julián Gorospe (ESP)	Reynolds	+ 1' 05"
3	Reimund Dietzen (FRG)	Teka	+ 1' 16"
4	Pedro Delgado (ESP)	PDM–Ultima–Concorde	+ 1' 43"
5	José Recio (ESP)	Kelme	+ 2' 01"
6	Ángel Arroyo (ESP)	Reynolds	+ 2' 18"
7	Henry Cárdenas (COL)	Café de Colombia–Varta	+ 2' 21"
8	Luis Herrera (COL)	Café de Colombia–Varta	+ 2' 38"
9	Óscar Vargas (COL)	Postobón–Manzana–Ryalcao	+ 2' 44"
10	Jesús Ignacio Ibáñez Loyo (ESP)	Zahor Chocolates	s.t.

== Stage 7 ==
30 April 1987 — La Seu d'Urgell to Cerler, 186 km (116 mi)

Stage 7 result

Rank	Rider	Team	Time
1	Laudelino Cubino (ESP)	BH	5h 32' 04"
2	Luis Herrera (COL)	Café de Colombia–Varta	+ 9"
3	Vicente Belda (ESP)	Kelme	+ 10"
4	Martin Earley (IRL)	Fagor–MBK	+ 41"
5	Pedro Delgado (ESP)	PDM–Ultima–Concorde	+ 42"
6	Yvon Madiot (FRA)	Système U	s.t.
7	Reimund Dietzen (FRG)	Teka	s.t.
8	Omar Hernández (COL)	Postobón–Manzana–Ryalcao	s.t.
9	Martín Ramírez (COL)	Café de Colombia–Varta	s.t.
10	Óscar Vargas (COL)	Postobón–Manzana–Ryalcao	s.t.

General classification after Stage 7

Rank	Rider	Team	Time
1	Reimund Dietzen (FRG)	Teka	32h 48' 39"
2	Sean Kelly (IRL)	Kas	+ 2"
3	Pedro Delgado (ESP)	PDM–Ultima–Concorde	+ 27"
4	Luis Herrera (COL)	Café de Colombia–Varta	+ 49"
5	Julián Gorospe (ESP)	Reynolds	+ 1' 07"
6	Óscar Vargas (COL)	Postobón–Manzana–Ryalcao	+ 1' 28"
7	Vicente Belda (ESP)	Kelme	+ 2' 00"
8	Martin Earley (IRL)	Fagor–MBK	+ 2' 05"
9	Martín Ramírez (COL)	Café de Colombia–Varta	+ 2' 09"
10	Yvon Madiot (FRA)	Système U	+ 2' 19"

== Stage 8 ==
1 May 1987 — Benasque to Zaragoza, 219 km (136 mi)

Stage 8 result

Rank	Rider	Team	Time
1	Iñaki Gastón (ESP)	Kas	5h 43' 04"
2	Alfonso Gutiérrez (ESP)	Teka	+ 1"
3	Sean Kelly (IRL)	Kas	s.t.
4	Manuel Jorge Domínguez (ESP)	BH	s.t.
5	Patrick Deneut (BEL)	DYC-Lucas	s.t.
6	Miguel Induráin (ESP)	Reynolds	s.t.
7	Jesús Suárez Cueva (ESP)	Zahor Chocolates	s.t.
8	Emanuele Bombini (ITA)	Gewiss–Bianchi	s.t.
9	Henri Manders (NED)	PDM–Ultima–Concorde	s.t.
10	Søren Lilholt (DEN)	Système U	s.t.

General classification after Stage 8

Rank	Rider	Team	Time
1	Reimund Dietzen (FRG)	Teka	38h 31' 44"
2	Sean Kelly (IRL)	Kas	+ 2"
3	Pedro Delgado (ESP)	PDM–Ultima–Concorde	+ 27"
4	Luis Herrera (COL)	Café de Colombia–Varta	+ 49"
5	Julián Gorospe (ESP)	Reynolds	+ 1' 07"
6	Óscar Vargas (COL)	Postobón–Manzana–Ryalcao	+ 1' 28"
7	Vicente Belda (ESP)	Kelme	+ 2' 00"
8	Martin Earley (IRL)	Fagor–MBK	+ 2' 05"
9	Martín Ramírez (COL)	Café de Colombia–Varta	+ 2' 09"
10	Yvon Madiot (FRA)	Système U	+ 2' 19"

== Stage 9 ==
2 May 1987 — Zaragoza to Pamplona, 180 km (110 mi)

Stage 9 result

Rank	Rider	Team	Time
1	Felipe Yáñez (ESP)	DYC-Lucas	4h 17' 15"
2	Antonio Esparza (ESP)	Caja Rural–Orbea	+ 2' 20"
3	Roberto Pagnin (ITA)	Gewiss–Bianchi	s.t.
4	José Recio (ESP)	Kelme	s.t.
5	René Beuker (NED)	PDM–Ultima–Concorde	s.t.
6	Néstor Mora (COL)	Postobón–Manzana–Ryalcao	s.t.
7	Henri Manders (NED)	PDM–Ultima–Concorde	+ 2' 23"
8	Alfonso Gutiérrez (ESP)	Teka	s.t.
9	Manuel Jorge Domínguez (ESP)	BH	s.t.
10	Reimund Dietzen (FRG)	Teka	s.t.

General classification after Stage 9

Rank	Rider	Team	Time
1	Reimund Dietzen (FRG)	Teka	42h 51' 22"
2	Sean Kelly (IRL)	Kas	+ 2"
3	Pedro Delgado (ESP)	PDM–Ultima–Concorde	+ 27"
4	Luis Herrera (COL)	Café de Colombia–Varta	+ 49"
5	Julián Gorospe (ESP)	Reynolds	+ 1' 07"
6	Óscar Vargas (COL)	Postobón–Manzana–Ryalcao	+ 1' 28"
7	Vicente Belda (ESP)	Kelme	+ 2' 00"
8	Martin Earley (IRL)	Fagor–MBK	+ 2' 05"
9	Martín Ramírez (COL)	Café de Colombia–Varta	+ 2' 09"
10	Yvon Madiot (FRA)	Système U	+ 2' 19"

== Stage 10 ==
3 May 1987 — Miranda de Ebro to Alto Campoo, 213 km (132 mi)

Stage 10 result

Rank	Rider	Team	Time
1	Enrique Aja (ESP)	Teka	6h 27' 19"
2	Erwin Nijboer (NED)	Caja Rural–Orbea	+ 1' 17"
3	Luis Herrera (COL)	Café de Colombia–Varta	+ 4' 18"
4	Jesús Blanco Villar (ESP)	Teka	s.t.
5	Martin Earley (IRL)	Fagor–MBK	s.t.
6	Yvon Madiot (FRA)	Système U	s.t.
7	Sean Kelly (IRL)	Kas	s.t.
8	Federico Echave (ESP)	BH	s.t.
9	Vicente Belda (ESP)	Kelme	s.t.
10	Iñaki Gastón (ESP)	Kas	s.t.

General classification after Stage 10

Rank	Rider	Team	Time
1	Reimund Dietzen (FRG)	Teka	49h 23' 29"
2	Sean Kelly (IRL)	Kas	+ 2"
3	Pedro Delgado (ESP)	PDM–Ultima–Concorde	+ 27"
4	Luis Herrera (COL)	Café de Colombia–Varta	+ 49"
5	Julián Gorospe (ESP)	Reynolds	+ 1' 07"
6	Óscar Vargas (COL)	Postobón–Manzana–Ryalcao	+ 1' 28"
7	Vicente Belda (ESP)	Kelme	+ 2' 00"
8	Martin Earley (IRL)	Fagor–MBK	+ 2' 05"
9	Yvon Madiot (FRA)	Système U	+ 2' 19"
10	Laudelino Cubino (ESP)	BH	+ 2' 29"

== Stage 11 ==
4 May 1987 — Santander to Lakes of Covadonga, 179 km (111 mi)

Stage 11 result

Rank	Rider	Team	Time
1	Luis Herrera (COL)	Café de Colombia–Varta	5h 16' 10"
2	Vicente Belda (ESP)	Kelme	+ 1' 26"
3	Sean Kelly (IRL)	Kas	+ 1' 28"
4	Óscar Vargas (COL)	Postobón–Manzana–Ryalcao	+ 1' 39"
5	Jesús Blanco Villar (ESP)	Teka	s.t.
6	Reimund Dietzen (FRG)	Teka	s.t.
7	Omar Hernández (COL)	Postobón–Manzana–Ryalcao	s.t.
8	Pablo Wilches (COL)	Postobón–Manzana–Ryalcao	s.t.
9	Ángel Arroyo (ESP)	Reynolds	+ 1' 48"
10	Laudelino Cubino (ESP)	BH	+ 1' 57"

General classification after Stage 11

Rank	Rider	Team	Time
1	Luis Herrera (COL)	Café de Colombia–Varta	54h 40' 28"
2	Sean Kelly (IRL)	Kas	+ 39"
3	Reimund Dietzen (FRG)	Teka	+ 50"
4	Óscar Vargas (COL)	Postobón–Manzana–Ryalcao	+ 2' 07"
5	Vicente Belda (ESP)	Kelme	+ 2' 37"
6	Pedro Delgado (ESP)	PDM–Ultima–Concorde	+ 2' 49"
7	Laudelino Cubino (ESP)	BH	+ 3' 37"
8	Anselmo Fuerte (ESP)	BH	+ 3' 57"
9	Yvon Madiot (FRA)	Système U	+ 4' 27"
10	Ángel Arroyo (ESP)	Reynolds	+ 5' 10"
