= List of teams and cyclists in the 1986 Vuelta a España =

For the 1986 Vuelta a España, the field consisted of 170 riders; 107 finished the race.

== By rider ==
Legend
No.	Starting number worn by the rider during the Vuelta
Pos.	Position in the general classification
Time	Deficit to the winner of the general classification
DNF	Denotes a rider who did not finish

No.	Name	Nationality	Team	Pos.	Time	Ref
1	Pedro Delgado	Spain	PDM–Ultima–Concorde	10	+ 11' 50"	
2	Gerrie Knetemann	Netherlands	PDM–Ultima–Concorde	59	+ 1h 34' 30"	
3	Stefan Mutter	Switzerland	PDM–Ultima–Concorde	19	+ 29' 16"	
4	Gerard Veldscholten	Netherlands	PDM–Ultima–Concorde	31	+ 57' 35"	
5	Jan van Wijk	Netherlands	PDM–Ultima–Concorde	DNF	—	
6	Peter Hoondert	Netherlands	PDM–Ultima–Concorde	94	+ 2h 19' 43"	
7	Wim Arras	Belgium	PDM–Ultima–Concorde	DNF	—	
8	René Beuker	Netherlands	PDM–Ultima–Concorde	96	+ 2h 22' 38"	
9	Hans Langerijs	Netherlands	PDM–Ultima–Concorde	DNF	—	
10	Henk Boeve	Netherlands	PDM–Ultima–Concorde	63	+ 1h 41' 34"	
11	Francisco Rodríguez Maldonado	Colombia	Zor–BH	DNF	—	
12	Álvaro Pino	Spain	Zor–BH	1	98h 16' 04"	
13	José Luis Navarro	Spain	Zor–BH	DNF	—	
14	Juan Fernández Martín	Spain	Zor–BH	DNF	—	
15	Philippe Bouvatier	France	Zor–BH	DNF	—	
16	Guido Van Calster	Belgium	Zor–BH	47	+ 1h 21' 00"	
17	Anselmo Fuerte	Spain	Zor–BH	9	+ 10' 50"	
18	Jesús Rodríguez Magro	Spain	Zor–BH	33	+ 59' 06"	
19	Francisco Antequera	Spain	Zor–BH	83	+ 2h 07' 12"	
20	Ángel Camarillo	Spain	Zor–BH	46	+ 1h 19' 17"	
21	Sean Kelly	Ireland	Kas	3	+ 5' 19"	
22	Jean-Luc Vandenbroucke	Belgium	Kas	78	+ 2h 01' 52"	
23	Iñaki Gastón	Spain	Kas	12	+ 14' 51"	
24	Dominique Garde	France	Kas	42	+ 1h 13' 24"	
25	Éric Guyot	France	Kas	18	+ 28' 38"	
26	Luis Javier Lukin	Spain	Kas	55	+ 1h 30' 25"	
27	Philippe Poissonnier	France	Kas	105	+ 2h 42' 49"	
28	Guy Gallopin	France	Kas	104	+ 2h 41' 10"	
29	Jacques Decrion	France	Kas	DNF	—	
30	Ronan Onghena	Belgium	Kas	DNF	—	
31	José Recio	Spain	Kelme	28	+ 56' 26"	
32	Vicente Belda	Spain	Kelme	30	+ 57' 09"	
33	Mariano Sánchez Martínez	Spain	Kelme	45	+ 1h 18' 57"	
34	Arsenio González	Spain	Kelme	43	+ 1h 13' 36"	
35	José Alirio Chizabas Torres	Colombia	Kelme	DNF	—	
36	Carlos Emiro Gutiérrez	Colombia	Kelme	17	+ 27' 26"	
37	Miguel Ángel Iglesias	Spain	Kelme	82	+ 2h 07' 07"	
38	Javier Castellar	Spain	Kelme	DNF	—	
39	Ricardo Martínez Matey	Spain	Kelme	90	+ 2h 15' 11"	
40	Bernardo Alfonsel	Spain	Kelme	81	+ 2h 04' 37"	
41	Pello Ruiz Cabestany	Spain	Seat–Orbea	6	+ 7' 26"	
42	Marino Lejarreta	Spain	Seat–Orbea	5	+ 7' 12"	
43	Jokin Mújika	Spain	Seat–Orbea	76	+ 1h 58' 51"	
44	Roland Le Clerc	France	Seat–Orbea	57	+ 1h 31' 13"	
45	Imanol Murga	Spain	Seat–Orbea	50	+ 1h 25' 09"	
46	Pascal Jules	France	Seat–Orbea	77	+ 1h 58' 57"	
47	Erwin Nijboer	Netherlands	Seat–Orbea	41	+ 1h 12' 19"	
48	José Salvador Sanchis	Spain	Seat–Orbea	62	+ 1h 39' 53"	
49	Jeronimo Ibañez Escribano	Spain	Seat–Orbea	80	+ 2h 02' 37"	
50	Manuel Jorge Domínguez	Spain	Seat–Orbea	75	+ 1h 58' 01"	
51	Robert Millar	Great Britain	Panasonic–Merckx–Agu	2	+ 56"	
52	Allan Peiper	Australia	Panasonic–Merckx–Agu	DNF	—	
53	Gert-Jan Theunisse	Netherlands	Panasonic–Merckx–Agu	79	+ 2h 02' 01"	
54	Peter Winnen	Netherlands	Panasonic–Merckx–Agu	15	+ 24' 13"	
55	Theo de Rooij	Netherlands	Panasonic–Merckx–Agu	89	+ 2h 14' 20"	
56	Jos Lammertink	Netherlands	Panasonic–Merckx–Agu	DNF	—	
57	Guy Nulens	Belgium	Panasonic–Merckx–Agu	48	+ 1h 22' 47"	
58	Eddy Planckaert	Belgium	Panasonic–Merckx–Agu	DNF	—	
59	Peter Harings	Netherlands	Panasonic–Merckx–Agu	DNF	—	
60	Danny Vanderaerden	Belgium	Panasonic–Merckx–Agu	DNF	—	
61	Miguel Induráin	Spain	Reynolds	92	+ 2h 17' 17"	
62	Julián Gorospe	Spain	Reynolds	DNF	—	
63	Ángel Arroyo	Spain	Reynolds	DNF	—	
64	Marc Gomez	France	Reynolds	74	+ 1h 57' 20"	
65	Celestino Prieto	Spain	Reynolds	DNF	—	
66	José Luis Laguía	Spain	Reynolds	25	+ 40' 59"	
67	Carlos Hernández Bailo	Spain	Reynolds	51	+ 1h 26' 27"	
68	Samuel Cabrera	Colombia	Reynolds	35	+ 1h 04' 38"	
69	Rubén Gorospe	Spain	Reynolds	58	+ 1h 31' 29"	
70	Anastasio Greciano	Spain	Reynolds	DNF	—	
71	Patrick Versluys	Belgium	Lois-Fangio	DNF	—	
72	Filip Van Vooren	Belgium	Lois-Fangio	DNF	—	
73	Edwin Bafcop	Belgium	Lois-Fangio	DNF	—	
74	William Tackaert	Belgium	Lois-Fangio	DNF	—	
75	Luc Wallays	Belgium	Lois-Fangio	DNF	—	
76	Patrick Verplancke	Belgium	Lois-Fangio	DNF	—	
77	Bruno Geuens	Belgium	Lois-Fangio	DNF	—	
78	Gery Verlinden	Belgium	Lois-Fangio	DNF	—	
79	Christian Wauters	Belgium	Lois-Fangio	DNF	—	
80	Dirk Demol	Belgium	Lois-Fangio	DNF	—	
81	Jesús Blanco Villar	Spain	Teka	16	+ 25' 14"	
82	Reimund Dietzen	West Germany	Teka	4	+ 5' 58"	
83	Peter Hilse	West Germany	Teka	DNF	—	
84	Alfonso Gutiérrez	Spain	Teka	103	+ 2h 38' 08"	
85	Eduardo Chozas	Spain	Teka	24	+ 40' 57"	
86	Ángel Sarrapio	Spain	Teka	99	+ 2h 27' 35"	
87	Antonio Agudelo	Colombia	Teka	DNF	—	
88	Enrique Aja	Spain	Teka	20	+ 30' 47"	
89	Federico Echave	Spain	Teka	36	+ 1h 05' 27"	
90	José Fernando Pacheco Sáez	Spain	Teka	106	+ 2h 43' 04"	
91	Laurent Fignon	France	Système U	7	+ 7' 29"	
92	Alain Bondue	France	Système U	102	+ 2h 37' 34"	
93	Éric Boyer	France	Système U	40	+ 1h 11' 13"	
94	Christophe Lavainne	France	Système U	67	+ 1h 48' 16"	
95	Dominique Lecrocq	France	Système U	DNF	—	
96	Yvon Madiot	France	Système U	14	+ 24' 07"	
97	Thierry Marie	France	Système U	DNF	—	
98	Charly Mottet	France	Système U	22	+ 36' 16"	
99	Pascal Robert	France	Système U	93	+ 2h 17' 54"	
100	Denis Roux	France	Système U	DNF	—	
101	Vladimir Muravski	Soviet Union	USSR (Amateur)	61	+ 1h 39' 51"	
102	Ivan Ivanov	Soviet Union	USSR (Amateur)	27	+ 53' 41"	
103	Viktor Demidenko	Soviet Union	USSR (Amateur)	39	+ 1h 09' 12"	
104	Andrei Vedernikov	Soviet Union	USSR (Amateur)	60	+ 1h 39' 09"	
105	Yury Kashirin	Soviet Union	USSR (Amateur)	56	+ 1h 30' 49"	
106	Alexander Osipov	Soviet Union	USSR (Amateur)	DNF	—	
107	Vladimir Voloshin	Soviet Union	USSR (Amateur)	DNF	—	
108	Oleg Logvin	Soviet Union	USSR (Amateur)	DNF	—	
109	Sergey Ermachenko	Soviet Union	USSR (Amateur)	DNF	—	
110	Sergey Sukhoruchenkov	Soviet Union	USSR (Amateur)	70	+ 1h 53' 58"	
111	Krzysztof Chrabąszcz	Poland	Poland (Amateur)	DNF	—	
112	Sławomir Podwójniak	Poland	Poland (Amateur)	DNF	—	
113	Darius Kaiser	Poland	Poland (Amateur)	97	+ 2h 22' 53"	
114	Zbigniew Ludwiniak	Poland	Poland (Amateur)	DNF	—	
115	Andrzej Półkośnik	Poland	Poland (Amateur)	101	+ 2h 35' 54"	
116	Tadeusz Piotrowicz	Poland	Poland (Amateur)	DNF	—	
117	Roman Rękosiewicz	Poland	Poland (Amateur)	DNF	—	
118	Wiesław Stopa	Poland	Poland (Amateur)	DNF	—	
119	Zbigniew Haitner	Poland	Poland (Amateur)	DNF	—	
120	Tadeusz Mytnik	Poland	Poland (Amateur)	DNF	—	
121	Felipe Yáñez	Spain	Zahor Chocolates	26	+ 52' 43"	
122	Juan Tomás Martínez	Spain	Zahor Chocolates	21	+ 33' 43"	
123	Jesús Suárez Cueva	Spain	Zahor Chocolates	71	+ 1h 54' 07"	
124	Isidro Juárez	Spain	Zahor Chocolates	66	+ 1h 46' 09"	
125	Sabino Angoitia	Spain	Zahor Chocolates	84	+ 2h 07' 33"	
126	Manuel Carrera Punzón	Spain	Zahor Chocolates	87	+ 2h 10' 31"	
127	Alberto Leanizbarrutia	Spain	Zahor Chocolates	73	+ 1h 57' 13"	
128	Jesús Gabriel Arguintxona Abarrategui	Spain	Zahor Chocolates	54	+ 1h 29' 50"	
129	Juan María Eguiarte	Spain	Zahor Chocolates	91	+ 2h 16' 20"	
130	Santiago Portillo Rosado	Spain	Zahor Chocolates	85	+ 2h 07' 34"	
131	Lucien Van Impe	Belgium	Dormilón	11	+ 14' 26"	
132	Roberto Córdoba	Spain	Dormilón	DNF	—	
133	Francisco Espinosa	Spain	Dormilón	DNF	—	
134	José Rafael García Martínez	Spain	Dormilón	98	+ 2h 24' 37"	
135	Jesús Guzmán Delgado	Spain	Dormilón	88	+ 2h 13' 45"	
136	Juan Martínez Oliver	Spain	Dormilón	65	+ 1h 44' 08"	
137	José María Moreno Ramírez	Spain	Dormilón	100	+ 2h 28' 46"	
138	Juan Alberto Reig Esteban	Spain	Dormilón	68	+ 1h 50' 30"	
139	José Del Ramo Nunez	Spain	Dormilón	72	+ 1h 55' 01"	
140	Benny Van Brabant	Belgium	Dormilón	86	+ 2h 09' 29"	
141	Rogelio Arango	Colombia	Postobón–Manzana–Ryalcao	DNF	—	
142	Reynel Montoya	Colombia	Postobón–Manzana–Ryalcao	DNF	—	
143	Néstor Mora	Colombia	Postobón–Manzana–Ryalcao	23	+ 39' 39"	
144	Omar Hernández	Colombia	Postobón–Manzana–Ryalcao	13	+ 21' 47"	
145	Pablo Wilches	Colombia	Postobón–Manzana–Ryalcao	29	+ 56' 28"	
146	Carlos Jaramillo	Colombia	Postobón–Manzana–Ryalcao	34	+ 1h 03' 04"	
147	Segundo Leopoldo Chaparro Cardoso	Colombia	Postobón–Manzana–Ryalcao	53	+ 1h 28' 54"	
148	Marco Aurelio Bernal	Colombia	Postobón–Manzana–Ryalcao	DNF	—	
149	Luis Fernando Mosquera	Colombia	Postobón–Manzana–Ryalcao	DNF	—	
150	Héctor Julio Patarroyo	Colombia	Postobón–Manzana–Ryalcao	DNF	—	
151	Fabio Parra	Colombia	Café de Colombia–Varta	8	+ 7' 44"	
152	Edgar Corredor	Colombia	Café de Colombia–Varta	37	+ 1h 08' 08"	
153	José Patrocinio Jiménez	Colombia	Café de Colombia–Varta	32	+ 58' 45"	
154	Rafael Acevedo	Colombia	Café de Colombia–Varta	44	+ 1h 13' 42"	
155	Abelardo Rondón	Colombia	Café de Colombia–Varta	52	+ 1h 27' 12"	
156	Jose-Alfonso López	Colombia	Café de Colombia–Varta	38	+ 1h 08' 28"	
157	Hernan Cristobal Diaz	Colombia	Café de Colombia–Varta	DNF	—	
158	Marco Antonio Léon Castro	Colombia	Café de Colombia–Varta	64	+ 1h 42' 06"	
159	Hernan Loayza Martínez	Colombia	Café de Colombia–Varta	DNF	—	
160	Juan Carlos Castillo	Colombia	Café de Colombia–Varta	DNF	—	
161	Ricardo Zúñiga	Spain	Colchón CR	69	+ 1h 51' 08"	
162	Faustino Cuelli	Spain	Colchón CR	DNF	—	
163	Hipolito Verdu Falco	Spain	Colchón CR	107	+ 2h 43' 14"	
164	Vicente Barberá Gómez	Spain	Colchón CR	DNF	—	
165	Valentín Dorronsoro Uranga	Spain	Colchón CR	DNF	—	
166	José Coll Pontanilla	Spain	Colchón CR	DNF	—	
167	Francisco Cambil Ruiz	Spain	Colchón CR	95	+ 2h 22' 16"	
168	Jesús Rodríguez Rodríguez	Spain	Colchón CR	DNF	—	
169	Guillermo De La Peña Garrido	Spain	Colchón CR	49	+ 1h 24' 40"	
170	José Claramunt Gallardo	Spain	Colchón CR	DNF	—	
