= List of teams and cyclists in the 1987 Giro d'Italia =

The 1987 Giro d'Italia was the 70th edition of the Giro d'Italia, one of cycling's Grand Tours. The field consisted of 180 riders, and 133 riders finished the race.

== By rider ==
Legend
No.	Starting number worn by the rider during the Giro
Pos.	Position in the general classification
DNF	Denotes a rider who did not finish

No.	Name	Nationality	Team	Pos.	Ref
1	Roberto Visentini	Italy	Carrera Jeans–Vagabond	DNF	
2	Guido Bontempi	Italy	Carrera Jeans–Vagabond	108	
3	Stephen Roche	Ireland	Carrera Jeans–Vagabond	1	
4	Bruno Leali	Italy	Carrera Jeans–Vagabond	57	
5	Massimo Ghirotto	Italy	Carrera Jeans–Vagabond	60	
6	Davide Cassani	Italy	Carrera Jeans–Vagabond	43	
7	Eddy Schepers	Belgium	Carrera Jeans–Vagabond	12	
8	Francesco Rossignoli	Italy	Carrera Jeans–Vagabond	87	
9	Claudio Chiappucci	Italy	Carrera Jeans–Vagabond	48	
11	Gianni Bugno	Italy	Atala–Ofmega	DNF	
12	Giuseppe Calcaterra	Italy	Atala–Ofmega	106	
13	Salvatore Cavallaro	Italy	Atala–Ofmega	116	
14	Dante Morandi	Italy	Atala–Ofmega	133	
15	Ezio Moroni	Italy	Atala–Ofmega	DNF	
16	Mario Noris	Italy	Atala–Ofmega	75	
17	Marco Vitali	Italy	Atala–Ofmega	63	
18	Massimo Podenzana	Italy	Atala–Ofmega	DNF	
19	Urs Freuler	Switzerland	Atala–Ofmega	104	
21	Marino Amadori	Italy	Ecoflam	40	
22	Daniele Caroli	Italy	Ecoflam	DNF	
23	Maurizio Rossi	Italy	Ecoflam	89	
24	Orlando Maini	Italy	Ecoflam	86	
25	Maurizio Fondriest	Italy	Ecoflam	DNF	
26	Camillo Passera	Italy	Ecoflam	81	
27	Marco Zen	Italy	Ecoflam	DNF	
28	Jiří Škoda	Czechoslovakia	Ecoflam	19	
29	Luciano Boffo	Italy	Ecoflam	97	
31	Kjell Nilsson	Sweden	Ariostea–Gres	34	
32	Alessandro Paganessi	Italy	Ariostea–Gres	29	
33	Dag Erik Pedersen	Norway	Ariostea–Gres	59	
34	Valerio Piva	Italy	Ariostea–Gres	74	
35	Fabio Roscioli	Italy	Ariostea–Gres	103	
36	Patrick Serra	Sweden	Ariostea–Gres	73	
37	Marco Saligari	Italy	Ariostea–Gres	54	
38	Maurizio Vandelli	Italy	Ariostea–Gres	50	
39	Alfio Vandi	Italy	Ariostea–Gres	33	
41	Giuseppe Saronni	Italy	Del Tongo	DNF	
42	Gianbattista Baronchelli	Italy	Del Tongo	DNF	
43	Francesco Cesarini	Italy	Del Tongo	DNF	
44	Maurizio Colombo	Italy	Del Tongo	118	
45	Flavio Giupponi	Italy	Del Tongo	5	
46	Alessandro Pozzi	Italy	Del Tongo	22	
47	Ennio Vanotti	Italy	Del Tongo	39	
48	Czesław Lang	Poland	Del Tongo	51	
49	Lech Piasecki	Poland	Del Tongo	53	
51	Pedro Muñoz	Spain	Fagor	18	
52	Frank Hoste	Belgium	Fagor	119	
53	Sean Yates	Great Britain	Fagor	DNF	
54	Pol Verschuere	Belgium	Fagor	DNF	
55	Jean-Claude Bagot	France	Fagor	25	
56	Robert Forest	France	Fagor	28	
57	Christian Chaubet	France	Fagor	123	
58	Éric Caritoux	France	Fagor	21	
59	Jean-René Bernaudeau	France	Fagor	DNF	
61	Stefano Colagè	Italy	Fibok	DNF	
62	Marco Franceschini	Italy	Fibok	91	
63	Silvano Riccò	Italy	Fibok	121	
64	Claudio Savini	Italy	Fibok	13	
65	Claudio Vandelli	Italy	Fibok	DNF	
66	Enrico Pochini	Italy	Fibok	46	
67	Gottfried Schmutz	Switzerland	Fibok	93	
68	Richard Trinkler	Switzerland	Fibok	61	
69	Bruno Hürlimann	Switzerland	Fibok	DNF	
71	Moreno Argentin	Italy	Gewiss–Bianchi	31	
72	Emanuele Bombini	Italy	Gewiss–Bianchi	20	
73	Stefan Brykt	Sweden	Gewiss–Bianchi	DNF	
74	Dario Mariuzzo	Italy	Gewiss–Bianchi	115	
75	Roberto Pagnin	Italy	Gewiss–Bianchi	41	
76	Renato Piccolo	Italy	Gewiss–Bianchi	47	
77	Paolo Rosola	Italy	Gewiss–Bianchi	126	
78	Alberto Volpi	Italy	Gewiss–Bianchi	23	
79	Lars Wahlqvist	Sweden	Gewiss–Bianchi	DNF	
81	Adriano Baffi	Italy	Gis Gelati–Jollyscarpe	125	
82	Franco Chioccioli	Italy	Gis Gelati–Jollyscarpe	14	
83	Federico Ghiotto	Italy	Gis Gelati–Jollyscarpe	DNF	
84	Marco Giovannetti	Italy	Gis Gelati–Jollyscarpe	6	
85	Giuseppe Petito	Italy	Gis Gelati–Jollyscarpe	77	
86	Johan van der Velde	Netherlands	Gis Gelati–Jollyscarpe	9	
87	Palmiro Masciarelli	Italy	Gis Gelati–Jollyscarpe	110	
88	Ennio Salvador	Italy	Gis Gelati–Jollyscarpe	82	
89	Giuseppe Manenti	Italy	Gis Gelati–Jollyscarpe	DNF	
91	Daniel Wyder	Switzerland	Transvemij-Van Schilt	72	
92	Jos Lammertink	Netherlands	Transvemij-Van Schilt	107	
93	Peter Pieters	Netherlands	Transvemij-Van Schilt	DNF	
94	Rob Kleinsman	Netherlands	Transvemij-Van Schilt	95	
95	Jean Habets	Netherlands	Transvemij-Van Schilt	62	
96	Frank Verleyen	Belgium	Transvemij-Van Schilt	DNF	
97	Jan Bogaert	Belgium	Transvemij-Van Schilt	132	
98	Corneille Daems	Belgium	Transvemij-Van Schilt	DNF	
99	Martin Schalkers	Netherlands	Transvemij-Van Schilt	102	
101	Enrico Grimani	Italy	Magniflex	129	
102	Franco Ballerini	Italy	Magniflex	124	
103	Angelo Canzonieri	Italy	Magniflex	DNF	
104	Bruno Cenghialta	Italy	Magniflex	84	
105	Flavio Chesini	Italy	Magniflex	98	
106	Enrico Galleschi	Italy	Magniflex	96	
107	Alessandro Giannelli	Italy	Magniflex	42	
108	Rodolfo Massi	Italy	Magniflex	24	
109	Mauro-Antonio Santaromita	Italy	Magniflex	38	
111	Marino Lejarreta	Spain	Orbea	4	
112	Jokin Mújika	Spain	Orbea	11	
113	Mathieu Hermans	Netherlands	Orbea	DNF	
114	Wim Meijer	Netherlands	Orbea	DNF	
115	Pascal Jules	France	Orbea	85	
116	Roland Le Clerc	France	Orbea	79	
117	Jesús Arambarri	Spain	Orbea	DNF	
118	Jaime Vilamajó	Spain	Orbea	99	
119	José Julián Balaguer	Spain	Orbea	105	
121	Rocco Cattaneo	Switzerland	Paini–Bottecchia–Sidi	DNF	
122	Mauro Gianetti	Switzerland	Paini–Bottecchia–Sidi	DNF	
123	Gianluca Brugnami	Italy	Paini–Bottecchia–Sidi	35	
124	Paul Popp	Austria	Paini–Bottecchia–Sidi	101	
125	Harald Maier	Austria	Paini–Bottecchia–Sidi	DNF	
126	Primož Čerin	Yugoslavia	Paini–Bottecchia–Sidi	DNF	
127	Luigi Furlan	Italy	Paini–Bottecchia–Sidi	49	
128	Mauro Longo	Italy	Paini–Bottecchia–Sidi	DNF	
129	Sergio Scremin	Italy	Paini–Bottecchia–Sidi	80	
131	Phil Anderson	Australia	Panasonic–Isostar	7	
132	Robert Millar	Great Britain	Panasonic–Isostar	2	
133	Eddy Planckaert	Belgium	Panasonic–Isostar	117	
134	Erik Breukink	Netherlands	Panasonic–Isostar	3	
135	Henk Lubberding	Netherlands	Panasonic–Isostar	69	
136	John Talen	Netherlands	Panasonic–Isostar	114	
137	Guy Nulens	Belgium	Panasonic–Isostar	27	
138	Theo de Rooij	Netherlands	Panasonic–Isostar	111	
139	Peter Winnen	Netherlands	Panasonic–Isostar	8	
141	Mario Beccia	Italy	Remac-Fanini	17	
142	Pierino Gavazzi	Italy	Remac-Fanini	71	
143	Luigi Botteon	Italy	Remac-Fanini	70	
144	Alberto Elli	Italy	Remac-Fanini	36	
145	Sergio Finazzi	Italy	Remac-Fanini	67	
146	Marco Tabai	Italy	Remac-Fanini	66	
147	Stefano Tomasini	Italy	Remac-Fanini	30	
148	Alessio Di Basco	Italy	Remac-Fanini	122	
149	Paolo Cimini	Italy	Remac-Fanini	88	
151	Hennie Kuiper	Netherlands	Roland	44	
152	Dietrich Thurau	West Germany	Roland	52	
153	John Bogers	Netherlands	Roland	DNF	
154	Johan Capiot	Belgium	Roland	131	
155	Herman Frison	Belgium	Roland	DNF	
156	Jesper Skibby	Denmark	Roland	DNF	
157	Brian Holm	Denmark	Roland	100	
158	Rudy Patry	Belgium	Roland	113	
159	Ludwig Wijnants	Belgium	Roland	90	
161	Roberto Conti	Italy	Selca	15	
162	Patrizio Gambirasio	Italy	Selca	DNF	
163	Giovanni Mantovani	Italy	Selca	DNF	
164	Michele Moro	Italy	Selca	DNF	
165	Romano Randi	Italy	Selca	92	
166	Edoardo Rocchi	Italy	Selca	58	
167	Fabrizio Vannucci	Italy	Selca	64	
168	Benny Van Brabant	Belgium	Selca	68	
169	Jesper Worre	Denmark	Selca	DNF	
171	Hubert Seiz	Switzerland	Supermercati Brianzoli–Chateau d'Ax	65	
172	Claudio Corti	Italy	Supermercati Brianzoli–Chateau d'Ax	DNF	
173	Stefano Allocchio	Italy	Supermercati Brianzoli–Chateau d'Ax	128	
174	Gerhard Zadrobilek	Austria	Supermercati Brianzoli–Chateau d'Ax	DNF	
175	Antonio Bevilacqua	Italy	Supermercati Brianzoli–Chateau d'Ax	78	
176	Franco Vona	Italy	Supermercati Brianzoli–Chateau d'Ax	32	
177	Stefano Zanatta	Italy	Supermercati Brianzoli–Chateau d'Ax	112	
178	Tony Rominger	Switzerland	Supermercati Brianzoli–Chateau d'Ax	DNF	
179	Milan Jurčo	Czechoslovakia	Supermercati Brianzoli–Chateau d'Ax	107	
181	Juan Fernández Martín	Spain	Zahor	94	
182	Juan Tomás Martínez	Spain	Zahor	37	
183	Jesús Ibáñez	Spain	Zahor	56	
184	Santiago Portillo	Spain	Zahor	76	
185	Juan María Eguiarte	Spain	Zahor	DNF	
186	Ángel de las Heras	Spain	Zahor	45	
187	Manuel Carrera	Spain	Zahor	DNF	
188	Vicente Prado	Spain	Zahor	DNF	
189	José María Palacín	Spain	Zahor	130	
191	Kim Andersen	Denmark	Toshiba–Look	DNF	
192	Steve Bauer	Canada	Toshiba–Look	10	
193	Jean-François Bernard	France	Toshiba–Look	16	
194	Philippe Chevallier	France	Toshiba–Look	55	
195	Othmar Häfliger	Switzerland	Toshiba–Look	109	
196	Christian Jourdan	France	Toshiba–Look	DNF	
197	Andreas Kappes	West Germany	Toshiba–Look	26	
198	Jaanus Kuum	Norway	Toshiba–Look	82	
199	Johan Lammerts	Netherlands	Toshiba–Look	120	
