= 1987 Vuelta a España =

Race details
- Dates: 23 April - 15 May
- Stages: 22 + Prologue
- Distance: 3,921 km (2,436 mi)
- Winning time: 105h 34' 25"

Results
Jersey awarded to the overall winner	Winner	Luis Herrera (COL)	(Café de Colombia–Varta)
	Second	Raimund Dietzen (GER)	(Teka)
	Third	Laurent Fignon (FRA)	(Système U)
Jersey awarded to the points classification winner	Points	Alfonso Gutiérrez (ESP)	(Teka)
Jersey awarded to the mountains classification winner	Mountains	Luis Herrera (COL)	(Café de Colombia–Varta)
Jersey awarded to the youth classification winner	Youth	Johnny Weltz (DEN)	(Fagor–MBK)
Jersey awarded to the combination classification winner	Combination	Laurent Fignon (FRA)	(Système U)
Jersey awarded to the sprints classification winner	Sprints	Miguel Ángel Iglesias (ESP)	(Frinca Colchón-CR)
	Team	(Colombia) Ryalcao Postobón	

The 42nd Edition Vuelta a España (Tour of Spain), a long-distance bicycle stage race and one of the 3 grand tours, was held from 23 April to 15 May 1987. It consisted of 22 stages covering a total of 3,921 km, and was won by Luis Herrera of the Café de Colombia cycling team. It was the first win of a Grand Tour by a Colombian and also the first of a South American.

With the 1986 Vuelta Champion, Álvaro Pino was absent due to health problems, the principal favourites for the overall classification were Laurent Fignon, Pedro Delgado and Sean Kelly. Jean Luc Vandenbroucke won the prologue and wore the first leader's jersey. Kelly who was in form after winning Paris–Nice for the sixth time won the first stage and took the jersey. The sixth stage saw the beginning of the fight for the overall classification. Luis Herrera in the company of Ángel Arroyo and Vicente Belda attacked several times on the final ascent of the stage. However Kelly was still able to ride into the leader's jersey again. On the following stage to Cerler which was won by the Spaniard Laudelino Cubino, Herrera put time into Kelly and Dietzen finished ahead of Kelly and took the leader's jersey. Herrera took the jersey after the 11th stage that finished on the Lagos de Covadonga. However Kelly retook the leader's jersey in the stage 18 time trial and with four stages to go it looked as if he was going to win his first grand tour. However Kelly was forced to withdraw from the race the following day due to a saddle boil. Fignon won the following stage and moved up to third place overall ahead of Delgado. Herrera took back the jersey which he kept to the end to win the race. It was the first win of a Grand Tour by a Colombian and also the first of a South American.

== Route ==
List of stages
Stage	Date	Course	Distance	Type	Winner
P	23 April	Benidorm to Benidorm	6.6 km (4 mi)	Individual time trial	Jean-Luc Vandenbroucke (BEL)
1	24 April	Benidorm to Albacete	219 km (136 mi)		Sean Kelly (IRL)
2	25 April	Albacete to Valencia	217 km (135 mi)		Paolo Rosola (ITA)
3	26 April	Valencia to Valencia	34.8 km (22 mi)	Individual time trial	Sean Kelly (IRL)
4	27 April	Valencia to Villarreal	169 km (105 mi)		Alfonso Gutiérrez (ESP)
5	28 April	Salou to Barcelona	165 km (103 mi)		Roberto Pagnin (ITA)
6	29 April	Barcelona to Grau Roig (Andorra)	220 km (137 mi)		Jesús Ignacio Ibáñez Loyo (ESP)
7	30 April	La Seu d'Urgell to Cerler	186 km (116 mi)		Laudelino Cubino (ESP)
8	1 May	Benasque to Zaragoza	219 km (136 mi)		Iñaki Gastón (ESP)
9	2 May	Zaragoza to Pamplona	180 km (112 mi)		Antonio Esparza (ESP)
10	3 May	Miranda de Ebro to Alto Campoo	213 km (132 mi)		Enrique Aja (ESP)
11	4 May	Santander to Lakes of Covadonga	179 km (111 mi)		Luis Herrera (COL)
12	5 May	Cangas de Onís to Oviedo	142 km (88 mi)		Carlos Hernández (ESP)
13	6 May	Luarca to Ferrol	223 km (139 mi)		Carlos Emiro Gutiérrez (COL)
14	7 May	Ferrol to A Coruña	220 km (137 mi)		Juan Fernández (ESP)
15	8 May	A Coruña to Vigo	185 km (115 mi)		Antonio Esparza (ESP)
16	9 May	Ponteareas to Ponferrada	237 km (147 mi)		Dominique Arnaud (FRA)
17	10 May	Ponferrada to Valladolid	221 km (137 mi)		Roberto Pagnin (ITA)
18	11 May	Valladolid to Valladolid	24 km (15 mi)	Individual time trial	Jesús Blanco Villar (ESP)
19	12 May	El Barco de Ávila to Ávila	213 km (132 mi)		Laurent Fignon (FRA)
20	13 May	Ávila to Palazuelos de Eresma (Destilerías DYC)	183 km (114 mi)		Omar Hernández (COL)
21	14 May	Palazuelos de Eresma (Destilerías DYC) to Collado Villalba	160 km (99 mi)		Francisco Rodríguez (COL)
22	15 May	Alcalá de Henares to Madrid	173 km (107 mi)		Jaime Vilamajó (ESP)
	Total		3,921 km (2,436 mi)		

== Classification leadership ==
Classification leadership by stage
Stage	Winner	General classification	Points classification	Mountains classification	Young rider classification	Team classification	Sprint classification	Flying goal classification
P	Jean-Luc Vandenbroucke	Jean-Luc Vandenbroucke	Jean-Luc Vandenbroucke	Not Awarded	Jesús Montoya	Kas	Not Awarded	Not Awarded
1	Sean Kelly	Sean Kelly	Sean Kelly	Henri Abadie	Johnny Weltz	Kas	José Enrique Carrera	Pello Ruiz Cabestany
2	Paolo Rosola	Roberto Pagnin	Sean Kelly	Omar Hernández	Luc Suykerbuyk	Kas	Roberto Pagnin	Pello Ruiz Cabestany
3	Sean Kelly	Sean Kelly	Sean Kelly	Omar Hernández	Jesús Montoya	Kas	Roberto Pagnin	Pello Ruiz Cabestany
4	Alfonso Gutiérrez	Sean Kelly	Sean Kelly	Mariano Sánchez Martinez	Jesús Montoya	Kas	Jesús Suárez Cueva	Miguel Ángel Iglesias
5	Roberto Pagnin	Roberto Pagnin	Sean Kelly	Henri Abadie	Jesús Montoya	Kas	Roberto Pagnin	Roberto Pagnin
6	Jesús Ignacio Ibáñez Loyo	Sean Kelly	Sean Kelly	Jesús Ignacio Ibáñez Loyo	Johnny Weltz	Kas	Roberto Pagnin	Miguel Ángel Iglesias
7	Laudelino Cubino	Reimund Dietzen	Sean Kelly	Luis Herrera	Johnny Weltz	Postobón–Manzana–Ryalcao	Henri Abadie	Miguel Ángel Iglesias
8	Iñaki Gastón	Reimund Dietzen	Sean Kelly	Luis Herrera	Johnny Weltz	Postobón–Manzana–Ryalcao	Jesús Suárez Cueva	Miguel Ángel Iglesias
9	Felipe Yáñez	Reimund Dietzen	Sean Kelly	Luis Herrera	Johnny Weltz	Postobón–Manzana–Ryalcao	Jesús Suárez Cueva	Miguel Ángel Iglesias
10	Enrique Aja	Reimund Dietzen	Sean Kelly	Luis Herrera	Johnny Weltz	Postobón–Manzana–Ryalcao	Jesús Suárez Cueva	Miguel Ángel Iglesias
11	Luis Herrera	Luis Herrera	Sean Kelly	Luis Herrera	Johnny Weltz	Postobón–Manzana–Ryalcao	Jesús Suárez Cueva	Miguel Ángel Iglesias
12	Carlos Hernández Bailo	Luis Herrera	Sean Kelly	Luis Herrera	Johnny Weltz	Postobón–Manzana–Ryalcao	Henri Abadie	Miguel Ángel Iglesias
13	Carlos Emiro Gutiérrez	Luis Herrera	Sean Kelly	Luis Herrera	Johnny Weltz	Postobón–Manzana–Ryalcao	Henri Abadie	Miguel Ángel Iglesias
14	Juan Fernández Martín	Luis Herrera	Sean Kelly	Luis Herrera	Johnny Weltz	Postobón–Manzana–Ryalcao	Jesús Suárez Cueva	Miguel Ángel Iglesias
15	Antonio Esparza	Luis Herrera	Sean Kelly	Luis Herrera	Johnny Weltz	Postobón–Manzana–Ryalcao	Henri Abadie	Miguel Ángel Iglesias
16	Dominique Arnaud	Luis Herrera	Sean Kelly	Luis Herrera	Johnny Weltz	Postobón–Manzana–Ryalcao	Henri Abadie	Miguel Ángel Iglesias
17	Roberto Pagnin	Luis Herrera	Sean Kelly	Luis Herrera	Johnny Weltz	Postobón–Manzana–Ryalcao	Henri Abadie	Miguel Ángel Iglesias
18	Jesús Blanco Villar	Sean Kelly	Sean Kelly	Luis Herrera	Johnny Weltz	Teka	Henri Abadie	Miguel Ángel Iglesias
19	Laurent Fignon	Luis Herrera	Alfonso Gutiérrez	Luis Herrera	Johnny Weltz	Postobón–Manzana–Ryalcao	Henri Abadie	Miguel Ángel Iglesias
20	Omar Hernández	Luis Herrera	Alfonso Gutiérrez	Luis Herrera	Johnny Weltz	Postobón–Manzana–Ryalcao	Henri Abadie	Miguel Ángel Iglesias
21	Francisco Rodríguez Maldonado	Luis Herrera	Alfonso Gutiérrez	Luis Herrera	Johnny Weltz	Postobón–Manzana–Ryalcao	Henri Abadie	Miguel Ángel Iglesias
22	Jaime Vilamajó	Luis Herrera	Alfonso Gutiérrez	Luis Herrera	Johnny Weltz	Postobón–Manzana–Ryalcao	Henri Abadie	Miguel Ángel Iglesias
Final		Luis Herrera	Alfonso Gutiérrez	Luis Herrera	Johnny Weltz	Postobón–Manzana–Ryalcao	Henri Abadie	Miguel Ángel Iglesias

== Final classification standings ==
=== General classification ===
Final general classification (1–10)
Rank	Rider	Team	Time
1	Luis Herrera (COL)	Café de Colombia–Varta	105h 34' 25"
2	Reimund Dietzen (FRG)	Teka	+ 1' 04"
3	Laurent Fignon (FRA)	Système U	+ 3' 13"
4	Pedro Delgado (ESP)	PDM–Ultima–Concorde	+ 3' 52"
5	Óscar Vargas (COL)	Postobón–Manzana–Ryalcao	+ 4' 03"
6	Vicente Belda (ESP)	Kelme	+ 4' 40"
7	Anselmo Fuerte (ESP)	BH	+ 4' 59"
8	Yvon Madiot (FRA)	Système U	+ 5' 25"
9	Henry Cárdenas (COL)	Café de Colombia–Varta	+ 7' 08"
10	Omar Hernández (COL)	Postobón–Manzana–Ryalcao	+ 7' 33"

=== Points classification ===
Final points classification (1–10)
Rank	Rider	Team	Points
1	Alfonso Gutiérrez (ESP)	Teka	149
2	Luis Herrera (COL)	Café de Colombia–Varta	104
3	Jesús Blanco Villar (ESP)	Teka	104
4	Reimund Dietzen (FRG)	Teka	100
5	Manuel Jorge Domínguez (ESP)	BH	92
6	Pascal Poisson (FRA)	Système U	85
7	Iñaki Gastón (ESP)	Kas	72
8	Vicente Belda (ESP)	Kelme	70
9	Søren Lilholt (DEN)	Système U	62
10	Laurent Fignon (FRA)	Système U	61

=== Mountains classification ===
Final mountains classification (1–10)
Rank	Rider	Team	Points
1	Luis Herrera (COL)	Café de Colombia–Varta	174
2	Vicente Belda (ESP)	Kelme	105
3	Henri Abadie (FRA)	Fagor-Larios	97
4	Omar Hernández (COL)	Postobón–Manzana–Ryalcao	89
5	Pablo Wilches (COL)	Postobón–Manzana–Ryalcao	68
6	Francisco Rodríguez Maldonado (COL)	BH	63
7	Jesús Ignacio Ibáñez Loyo (ESP)	Zahor	49
8	Enrique Aja (ESP)	Teka	42
9	Laurent Biondi (FRA)	Système U	42
10	Mariano Sánchez Martinez (ESP)	Dormilón	42

=== Young rider classification ===
Final young rider classification (1–6)
Rank	Rider	Team	Time
1	Johnny Weltz (DEN)	Fagor-Larios	106h 25' 35"
2	Henri Abadie (FRA)	Fagor-Larios	+ 7' 12"
3	Jesús Montoya (ESP)	Kas	+ 42' 45"
4	Roberto Torres (ESP)	Zahor	+ 43' 41"
5	Joaquín Hernández Hernández (ESP)	Kelme	+ 1h 05' 57"
6	Serafin Vieira De Araujo (POR)	Sporting–Vitalis	+ 1h 06' 25"

=== Team classification ===
Final team classification (1–10)
Rank	Team	Time
1	Postobón–Manzana–Ryalcao	316h 51' 36"
2	BH	+ 1' 42"
3	Café de Colombia–Varta	+ 3' 20"
4	Système U	+ 13' 13"
5	Teka	+ 24' 58"
6	Kas	+ 1h 02' 20"
7	Zahor	+ 1h 09' 07"
8	PDM–Ultima–Concorde	+ 1h 14' 41"
9	Reynolds	+ 1h 20' 17"
10	Kelme	+ 1h 22' 11"

=== Sprint classification ===
Final sprint classification (1–10)
Rank	Rider	Team	Points
1	Henri Abadie (FRA)	Fagor-Larios	25
2	Laurent Fignon (FRA)	Système U	14
3	Carlos Emiro Gutiérrez (COL)	Kelme	9
4	Antonio Coll (ESP)	Kelme	9
5	Pascal Poisson (FRA)	Système U	6
6	Juan Fernández Martín (ESP)	Zahor	6
7	Éric Guyot (FRA)	Système U	6
8	Jesús Ignacio Ibáñez Loyo (ESP)	Zahor	6
9	Santiago Portillo Rosado (ESP)	Zahor	6
10	Ricardo Zúñiga Carrasco (ESP)	Frinca-Colchón CR	5

=== Flying goal classification ===
Final flying goal classification (1–10)
Rank	Rider	Team	Points
1	Miguel Ángel Iglesias (ESP)	Frinca-Colchón CR	31
2	Henri Abadie (FRA)	Fagor-Larios	12
3	Laurent Fignon (FRA)	Système U	9
4	Antonio Coll (ESP)	Kelme	8
5	Carlos Emiro Gutiérrez (COL)	Kelme	8
6	Laurent Biondi (FRA)	Système U	7
7	Ricardo Zúñiga Carrasco (ESP)	Frinca-Colchón CR	7
8	Marino Lejarreta (ESP)	Caja Rural–Orbea	6
9	Jesús Ignacio Ibáñez Loyo (ESP)	Zahor	6
10	Éric Guyot (FRA)	Système U	6
