= 1990 GP Ouest-France =

Race details
- Dates: 21 August 1990
- Stages: 1
- Distance: 208 km (129.2 mi)
- Winning time: 5h 00' 08"

Results
	Winner	Bruno Cornillet (FRA)	(Z–Tomasso)
	Second	Martial Gayant (FRA)	(Toshiba)
	Third	Thomas Wegmüller (SUI)	(Weinmann–SMM–Uster)

The 1990 GP Ouest-France was the 54th edition of the GP Ouest-France cycle race and was held on 21 August 1990. The race started and finished in Plouay. The race was won by Bruno Cornillet of the Z–Tomasso team.

== General classification ==
Final general classification

Rank	Rider	Team	Time
1	Bruno Cornillet (FRA)	Z–Tomasso	5h 00' 08"
2	Martial Gayant (FRA)	Toshiba	+ 0"
3	Thomas Wegmüller (SUI)	Weinmann–SMM–Uster	+ 5"
4	Robert Millar (GBR)	Z–Tomasso	+ 54"
5	Pascal Lance (FRA)	Toshiba	+ 55"
6	Søren Lilholt (DEN)	Histor–Sigma	+ 1' 32"
7	Yvon Madiot (FRA)	Toshiba	+ 1' 44"
8	Luigi Furlan (ITA)	Helvetia–La Suisse	+ 1' 44"
9	Johan Verstrepen (BEL)	Histor–Sigma	+ 2' 35"
10	Adri van der Poel (NED)	Weinmann–SMM–Uster	+ 3' 22"
