= Juan Carlos Castillo =

Colombian cyclist

Personal information
- Born: 19 August 1964 Manizales, Colombia
- Died: 25 November 1993 (aged 29) Chinchiná, Colombia

Cycling career
- Sport: Cycling
- Discipline: Road
- Role: Rider

Professional teams
- 1985–1988: Varta–Café de Colombia–Mavic
- 1989–1991: Postobón–Manzana
- 1992: Gaseosas Glacial

Juan Carlos Castillo (19 August 1964 – 25 November 1993) was a Colombian racing cyclist. He rode in two editions of the Tour de France. He was shot dead in his car in Colombia.

== Major results ==
1984
1st Overall Vuelta de la Juventud de Colombia
1985
1st Stage 5 Vuelta al Ecuador

=== Grand Tour general classification results timeline ===
Grand Tour	1985	1986	1987	1988	1989	1990
Vuelta a España	—	DNF	31	—	DNF	—
Giro d'Italia	DNF	—	—	—	—	—
Tour de France	—	—	36	—	—	79
