= Madiot =

Madiot (English: /mædiˈoʊ/, French: [madjo]) is a French surname. Notable people with the surname include:

- Marc Madiot (born 1959), French cyclist
- Yvon Madiot (born 1962), French cyclist, brother of Marc
