= 1987 Gent–Wevelgem =

Race details
- Dates: 8 April 1987
- Stages: 1
- Distance: 243 km (151 mi)
- Winning time: 5h 44' 00"

Results
	Winner	Teun van Vliet (NED)	(Panasonic–Isostar)
	Second	Etienne De Wilde (BEL)	(Sigma–Fina)
	Third	Herman Frison (BEL)	(Roland–Skala)

The 1987 Gent–Wevelgem was the 49th edition of the Belgian Gent–Wevelgem cycle race and was held on 8 April 1987. The race started in Ghent and finished in Wevelgem. The race was won by Teun van Vliet of the Panasonic team.

== General classification ==
Final general classification

Rank	Rider	Team	Time
1	Teun van Vliet (NED)	Panasonic–Isostar	5h 44' 00"
2	Etienne De Wilde (BEL)	Sigma–Fina	+ 0"
3	Herman Frison (BEL)	Roland–Skala	+ 9"
4	Roberto Pagnin (ITA)	Gewiss–Bianchi	+ 9"
5	Allan Peiper (AUS)	Panasonic–Isostar	+ 9"
6	Rudy Dhaenens (BEL)	Hitachi–Marc	+ 9"
7	Yvon Madiot (FRA)	Système U	+ 12"
8	Eric Vanderaerden (BEL)	Panasonic–Isostar	+ 32"
9	Ludo Peeters (BEL)	Superconfex–Kwantum–Yoko–Colnago	+ 32"
10	Phil Anderson (AUS)	Panasonic–Isostar	+ 32"
