= Carlos Emiro Gutiérrez =

Colombian cyclist (born 1960)

Personal information
- Full name: Carlos Emiro Gutiérrez Jerez
- Born: 3 November 1960 (age 65) Bucaramanga, Colombia

Cycling career
- Sport: Cycling
- Current team: Retired
- Discipline: Road
- Role: Rider

Professional teams
- 1985: Varta–Café de Colombia–Mavic
- 1985–1987: Kelme–Merckx
- 1988–1990: Postobón–Manzana

Major wins
- Grand Tours Vuelta a España 1 individual stage (1987)

Carlos Emiro Gutiérrez Jerez (born 3 November 1960) is a Colombian former road cyclist. Professional from 1985 to 1990, he most notably won a stage of the 1987 Vuelta a España.

== Major results ==
1980
1st Stage 2b Vuelta de la Juventud de Colombia
1983
1st Stage 8 Vuelta a Colombia
1984
1st Overall Tour de Martinique
1987
1st Stage 13 Vuelta a España
9th Trofeo Masferrer

=== Grand Tour general classification results timeline ===
Grand Tour	1986	1987
Vuelta a España	17	39
Giro d'Italia	—	—
Tour de France	—	—

Legend
—	Did not compete
DNF	Did not finish
