= Stefan Brykt =

Swedish cyclist

Personal information
- Born: 14 July 1964 (age 62) Mora, Sweden

Cycling career
- Sport: Cycling

Stefan Brykt (born 14 July 1964) is a Swedish former cyclist. He competed in the individual road race event at the 1984 Summer Olympics.
