= Jesús Ignacio Ibáñez Loyo =

Spanish cyclist

Personal information
- Born: 18 March 1960 (age 66) Ametzaga, Zuia, Spain

Cycling career
- Sport: Cycling
- Current team: Retired
- Discipline: Road
- Role: Rider

Professional teams
- 1983–1986: Zor–Gemeaz Cusin
- 1987–1988: Zahor Chocolates

Major wins
- Grand Tours Vuelta a España 1 individual stage (1987) One-day races and Classics National Road Race Championships (1984)

Jesús Ignacio Ibáñez Loyo (born 18 March 1960 in Ametzaga, Zuia) is a retired Spanish cyclist.

== Major results ==
1983
3rd Vuelta a Castilla
1st stage 4
1984
National Road Race Champion
1st stage 6 Vuelta a Asturias
2nd Memorial Manuel Galera
3rd Vuelta a Asturias
1987
1st stage 6 Vuelta a España
