= Johnny Weltz =

Danish cyclist (born 1962)

Personal information
- Full name: Johnny Weltz
- Born: 20 March 1962 (age 64) Copenhagen, Denmark
- Height: 1.78 m (5 ft 10 in)
- Weight: 65 kg (143 lb; 10 st 3 lb)

Cycling career
- Sport: Cycling
- Current team: Retired
- Discipline: Road
- Role: Rider

Professional teams
- 1987–1988: Fagor–MBK
- 1989–1993: ONCE
- 1994: Artiach–Nabisco
- 1995: Motorola

Managerial teams
- 1996: Motorola
- 1997–1999: U.S. Postal Service
- 2000–2004: Memory Card–Jack & Jones
- 2005–2016: TIAA–CREF

Major wins
- Grand Tours Tour de France 1 individual Stage (1988) Vuelta a España 1 individual Stage (1988) 1 TTT Stage (1991) One-day races and Classics National Road Race Championships (1989)
Medal record
Men's road bicycle racing
Representing Denmark
World Championships
Silver medal – second place	1985 Giavara del Montello	Amateur's Road Race

Johnny Weltz (born 20 March 1962) is a Danish retired road bicycle racer. He rode most of his career for the Spanish ONCE team.

In 1985 he won silver at the world championship for amateurs. The high point of his career was his victory at stage 19 (a mountain stage) of the 1988 Tour de France, and was 54 overall. He also won a stage in Vuelta a España the same year.

After his active career, he worked in various capacities for the professional teams Motorola, U.S. Postal Service, and Team CSC (back then called MemoryCard – Jack&Jones, and later CSC – World Online). Weltz was most recently a directeur sportif with Team Slipstream.

== Major results ==
1985
2nd Road race, UCI Amateur World Road Championships
8th Overall Milk Race
9th Overall Tour of Ireland
1986
8th Overall Milk Race
1987
1st Grand Prix La Marseillaise
1st GP de Plumelec-Morbihan
6th Grand Prix de Rennes
7th Overall Tour du Limousin
7th Bretagne Classic
8th Overall Route d'Occitanie
9th Overall Étoile de Bessèges
9th Overall Tour of Ireland
9th Critérium des As
1988
1st Stage 15 Vuelta a España
1st Stage 19 Tour de France
3rd Overall Tour du Limousin
4th Subida a Urkiola
1989
1st Road race, National Road Championships
1st Stage 1 Tour of the Basque Country
7th GP Villafranca de Ordizia
9th Overall Tour de l'Avenir
1990
2nd GP de la Libération (TTT)
7th road race, UCI World Road Championships
1991
1st Stage 2 (TTT) Vuelta a España
1st Stage 7 Vuelta a Asturias
1st Stage 1 (TTT) Volta a Catalunya
2nd TTT GP de la Libération
2nd Circuito de Getxo
9th Milan–San Remo
1992
1st Stage 1 Vuelta a Mallorca
9th Overall Tour de Picardie
1993
1st GP Miguel Induráin
1st Stage 2 TTT Paris–Nice

=== Grand Tour general classification results timeline ===
Grand Tour	1987	1988	1989	1990	1991	1992	1993	1994	1995
Vuelta a España	42	53	—	28	48	—	—	51	90
Giro d'Italia	Did not contest during his career								
Tour de France	—	54	—	DNF	DNF	102	—	—	—

Legend
—	Did not compete
DNF	Did not finish
