= Luigi Furlan =

Italian cyclist

Personal information
- Born: 22 June 1963 (age 63) Geneva, Switzerland

Cycling career
- Sport: Cycling
- Role: Rider

Luigi Furlan (born 22 June 1963) is an Italian former professional racing cyclist. He rode in the 1986 Tour de France.
