= Serafim Vieira =

Portuguese cyclist

Personal information
- Full name: Serafim da Araújo Vieira
- Born: 7 November 1966 (age 59) Marco de Canaveses, Portugal

Cycling career
- Sport: Cycling
- Current team: Retired
- Discipline: Road
- Role: Rider

Professional teams
- 1986–1987: Sporting–Vitalis
- 1988–1989: Louletano–Vale do Lobo
- 1990–1995: Sicasal–Acral
- 1996–1997: LA Alumínios–A.C. Malveira

Major wins
- One-day races and Classics National Road Race Championships (1987, 1988)

Serafim da Araújo Vieira (born 7 November 1966) is a Portuguese former road cyclist. Professional from 1986 to 1997, he most notably won the Portuguese National Road Race Championships in 1987 and 1988. He also rode in seven editions of the Vuelta a España as well as in the 1995 Giro d'Italia.

== Major results ==
1986
10th Overall Troféu Joaquim Agostinho
1987
1st Road race, National Road Championships
1st Stages 4b, 9 & 14 Volta a Portugal
1st Stage 3 Grande Prémio Jornal de Notícias
1st Stages 1a & 1b GP Costa Azul
1st Stage 8 Troféu Joaquim Agostinho
1988
1st Road race, National Road Championships
6th Overall Volta ao Algarve
1989
4th Overall Volta ao Algarve

1st Stages 2 & 3

4th Overall Troféu Joaquim Agostinho
1995
3rd Road race, National Road Championships

=== Grand Tour general classification results timeline ===
Grand Tour	1987	1988	1989	1990	1991	1992	1993	1994	1995
Giro d'Italia	—	—	—	—	—	—	—	—	91
Tour de France	—	—	—	—	—	—	—	—	—
Vuelta a España	83	—	—	77	108	45	28	DNF	73

Legend
DSQ	Disqualified
DNF	Did not finish
