= Jacques Decrion =

French cyclist

Personal information
- Born: 18 November 1961 (age 64) Besançon, France

Cycling career
- Sport: Cycling
- Role: Rider

Jacques Decrion (born 18 November 1961) is a French former professional racing cyclist. He rode in one edition of the Tour de France, two editions of the Giro d'Italia and three editions of the Vuelta a España.
