= Israel Corredor =

Colombian cyclist

Personal information
- Born: 25 July 1959 (age 67) La Calera, Colombia

Cycling career
- Sport: Cycling
- Role: Rider

Israel Corredor (born 25 July 1959) is a Colombian former professional racing cyclist. He rode in three editions of the Tour de France and two editions of the Vuelta a España.
