= Søren Lilholt =

Danish cyclist (born 1965)

Personal information
- Born: 22 September 1965 (age 61) Copenhagen, Denmark

Cycling career
- Sport: Cycling
- Current team: Retired
- Discipline: Road
- Role: Rider

Professional teams
- 1986–1987: Système U
- 1988: Sigma
- 1989–1991: Histor–Sigma
- 1992: Tulip Computers

Søren Lilholt (born 22 September 1965) is a Danish former racing cyclist. He rode in eight Grand Tours between 1987 and 1992 completing five of them. He also competed at the 1984 Summer Olympics. During the 1990 Tour de France he was involved in many breakaway attempts as he placed in the top ten for the overall Combativity award.

== Major results ==
1983
World Road Championships

1st Junior road race
1st Junior team time trial (with Kim Olsen, Alex Pedersen and Rolf Sørensen)

1984
1st Stage 1 Tour of Sweden
1985
2nd Overall Circuit Franco Belge
2nd Grand Prix de la Ville de Lillers
1986
1st Stage 2 Tour of Sweden
1st Stage 2 Étoile de Bessèges
2nd Tour de Vendée
2nd Overall Tour de Luxembourg
3rd Grand Prix de Plouay
1987
1st Overall Tour de Luxembourg

1st Stage 1

2nd Omloop van het Waasland
3rd Overall Danmark Rundt
1988
1st National Road Race Championships
1st Stage 4 Tour of Sweden
1st Stage 2 Paris–Nice
1st Overall Tour d'Armorique
1st Stages 3 & 4B Tour de Luxembourg
3rd Overall Danmark Rundt
3rd Overall Étoile de Bessèges
1989
2nd Giro del Piemonte
1990
1st E3 Harelbeke
1st Stage 3 Volta a la Comunitat Valenciana
1st Stage 4 Tour of Britain
1st Stage 1 Tour d'Armorique
1st Flèche Hesbignonne
2nd Grand Prix de Fourmies
2nd National Time Trial Championships
3rd Grand Prix Pino Cerami
1991
1st Stage 4 Volta a la Comunitat Valenciana
3rd A Travers le Morbihan

=== Grand Tour general classification results timeline ===
| Grand Tour | 1987 | 1988 | 1989 | 1990 | 1991 | 1992 |
|---|---|---|---|---|---|---|
| Giro d'Italia | — | — | — | — | — | 100 |
| Tour de France | — | 99 | DNF | 85 | DNF | 99 |
| Vuelta a España | 51 | — | DNF | — | — | — |

Legend
| — | Did not compete |
| DNF | Did not finish |
