= Luis Herrera (cyclist) =

Colombian cyclist (born 1961)

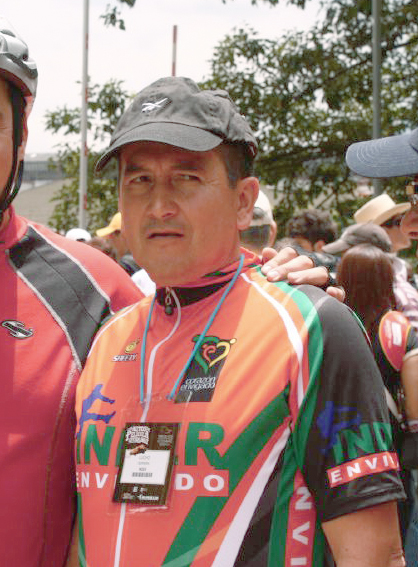

Personal information
- Full name: Luis Alberto Herrera
- Nicknames: Lucho; El jardinerito de Fusagasugá
- Born: May 4, 1961 (age 65) Fusagasugá, Colombia

Cycling career
- Sport: Cycling
- Discipline: Road
- Role: Rider
- Rider type: Climbing specialist

Amateur teams
- 1981: Valyin de Pereira
- 1982: Lotería de Boyacá
- 1983: Leche La Gran Vía
- 1984: Varta Nacional A

Professional teams
- 1985–1990: Café de Colombia
- 1991–1992: Ryalco Postobon

Major wins
- Grand Tours Tour de France Mountains classification (1985, 1987) 3 individual stages (1984, 1985) Giro d'Italia Mountains classification (1989) 3 individual stages (1989, 1992) Vuelta a España General classification (1987) Mountains classification (1987, 1991) 2 individual stages (1987, 1991) Stage races Critérium du Dauphiné Libéré (1988, 1991) Vuelta a Colombia (1984, 1985, 1986, 1988) Clásico RCN (1982, 1983, 1984, 1986)

Luis Alberto "Lucho" Herrera Herrera, known as "El jardinerito" ("the little gardener"; born May 4, 1961, in Fusagasugá, Colombia), is a retired Colombian road racing cyclist. Herrera was a professional from 1985 to 1992 but had a successful amateur career before that in Colombia.

He entered his first Vuelta a Colombia in 1981 where he finished 16th overall and 3rd in the New Rider competition. Although he abandoned his second Vuelta a Colombia in 1982, he won Colombia's second major stage-race, the Clásico RCN. In 1983 Herrera won Clásico RCN again as well as two stages and finished second overall to Alfonso Florez Ortiz in the 1983 Vuelta a Colombia. In 1984 he won the Vuelta a Colombia, and the Clásico RCN.

In 1984 he won stage 17 to Alpe d'Huez in the 1984 Tour de France, becoming the first Colombian to win a stage of the race, and the first amateur cyclist to win a stage in the history of the Tour de France. He won the Vuelta a Colombia and the Clásico RCN four times each. His greatest achievement was in 1987, when he won the Vuelta a España, the first South American to win a Grand Tour. Herrera also won the Critérium du Dauphiné Libéré in 1988 and 1991.

Herrera won five "King of the Mountains" jerseys from the three Grand Tours. He is the second rider to win the King of the Mountains jersey in all three Grand Tours. The first was Federico Bahamontes of Spain.

In 2025, Harrera was accused by an ex-paramilitary fighter of being involved in the killings of four farmers in Fusagasugá in 2003.

== Career achievements ==
=== Major results ===
1981
1st Stage 5 Clásico RCN
1982
1st Overall Clásico RCN

1st Stages 2, 7 & 10

4th Overall Tour de l'Avenir

1st Stage 10

1983
1st Overall Clásico RCN

1st Stage 8

Coors Classic

1st Stages 1 & 3

1st Stage 6b Grand Prix Guillaume Tell
2nd Overall Vuelta a Colombia

1st Stages 9 & 14

1984
1st Overall Clásico RCN

1st Stage 8

1st Overall Vuelta a Colombia

1st Stages 6, 9 & 10

1st Stage 17 Tour de France
1985
1st Overall Vuelta a Colombia

1st Stages 5 & 8

2nd Overall Clásico RCN
7th Overall Tour de France

1st Mountains classification
1st Stages 11 & 14

1986
1st Overall Clásico RCN

1st Prologue, Stages 2 & 4 (ITT)

1st Overall Vuelta a Colombia

1st Stage 6

1987
1st Overall Vuelta a España

1st Mountains classification
1st Stage 11

2nd Overall Vuelta a Colombia

1st Prologue

5th Overall Tour de France

1st Mountains classification

1988
1st Overall Critérium du Dauphiné Libéré

1st Stage 6b

1st Overall Vuelta a Colombia

1st Stages 2 & 11

6th Overall Tour de France
1989
Giro d'Italia

1st Mountains classification
1st Stages 13 & 18 (ITT)

1990
4th Overall Clásico RCN

1st Prologue

1991
1st Overall Critérium du Dauphiné Libéré

1st Stage 5

Vuelta a España

1st Mountains classification
1st Stage 16

Volta a Catalunya

1st Mountains classification
1st Stage 6

6th Overall Setmana Catalana de Ciclisme
9th Overall Vuelta a Murcia
1992
1st Overall Vuelta a Aragón

1st Stage 5

1st Prologue Vuelta a Colombia
8th Overall Giro d'Italia

1st Stage 9

=== Grand Tour general classification results timeline ===
Grand Tour	1984	1985	1986	1987	1988	1989	1990	1991	1992
Vuelta a España	—	DNF	—	1	20	—	12	13	DNF
Giro d'Italia	—	—	—	—	—	18	—	—	8
Tour de France	27	7	22	5	6	19	—	31	—

Legend
—	Did not compete
DNF	Did not finish

==== Grand Tour record ====
	1984	1985	1986	1987	1988	1989	1990	1991	1992
Vuelta a España	DNE	DNS-13	DNE	1	20	DNE	12	13	DNF-12
Stages won	—	0	—	1	0	—	0	1	0
Points classification	—	—	—	2	NR	—	NR	9	—
Mountains classification	—	—	—	1	NR	—	NR	1	—
Giro d'Italia	DNE	DNE	DNE	DNE	DNE	18	DNE	DNE	8
Stages won	—	—	—	—	—	2	—	—	1
Points classification	—	—	—	—	—	NR	—	—	16
Mountains classification	—	—	—	—	—	1	—	—	9
Tour de France	27	7	22	5	6	19	DNE	31	DNE
Stages won	1	2	0	0	0	0	—	0	—
Points classification	NR	8	NR	6	NR	NR	—	NR	—
Mountains classification	4	1	2	1	10	10	—	38	—

Legend
1	Winner
2–3	Top three-finish
4–10	Top ten-finish
11–	Other finish
DNE	Did not enter
DNF-x	Did not finish (retired on stage x)
DNS-x	Did not start (not started on stage x)
HD-x	Finished outside time limit (occurred on stage x)
DSQ	Disqualified
N/A	Race/classification not held
NR	Not ranked in this classification
