= Miguel Ángel Iglesias =

Spanish cyclist

Personal information
- Full name: Miguel Ángel Iglesias Guerrero
- Born: 9 June 1961 (age 65) Valls, Spain

Cycling career
- Sport: Cycling
- Current team: Retired
- Discipline: Road
- Role: Rider
- Rider type: Sprinter

Professional teams
- 1982–1986: Kelme–Merckx
- 1987–1989: Colchón CR
- 1990–1992: Puertas Mavisa

Miguel Ángel Iglesias Guerrero (born 9 June 1961) is a Spanish former road cyclist, who competed as a professional from 1982 to 1992. He won the intermediate sprints classification in the Vuelta a España five times, between 1987 and 1991.

== Major results ==
1982
1st Overall Volta a Lleida
1983
1st Stage 3 Vuelta a La Rioja
3rd Trofeo Masferrer
4th Subida al Naranco
1984
2nd Clásica de Sabiñánigo
3rd Trofeo Masferrer
8th Overall Vuelta a Aragón
1985
1st Torrejón-DYC
3rd Overall Vuelta a Castilla y León

1st Stage 1

4th Clásica de San Sebastián
1987
1st Intermediate sprints classification, Vuelta a España
1st Stage 1 Vuelta a La Rioja
1988
1st Intermediate sprints classification, Vuelta a España
1st Stage 4 Volta a Catalunya
3rd Trofeo Masferrer
1989
1st Intermediate sprints classification, Vuelta a España
1990
1st Intermediate sprints classification, Vuelta a España
1991
1st Intermediate sprints classification, Vuelta a España

=== Grand Tour general classification results timeline ===
Grand Tour	1983	1984	1985	1986	1987	1988	1989	1990	1991	1992
Giro d'Italia	—	—	—	—	—	—	—	—	—	—
Tour de France	—	—	—	—	—	—	—	—	—	—
Vuelta a España	DNF	42	55	82	75	88	77	96	100	DNF

Legend
—	Did not compete
DNF	Did not finish
