= Wim Arras =

Belgian cyclist

Personal information
- Full name: Wim Arras
- Born: 7 February 1964 (age 62) Lier, Belgium

Cycling career
- Sport: Cycling
- Discipline: Road
- Role: Rider
- Rider type: Sprinter

Wim Arras (born 7 February 1964 in Lier) is a Belgian former cyclist who specialized in sprinting. He won the Paris–Brussels race. His cycling career ended abruptly when he had to retire due to a motorcycle accident in 1990.
