= Henri Abadie =

French cyclist

Personal information
- Born: 13 February 1963 (age 63) Tarbes, France

Cycling career
- Sport: Cycling
- Role: Rider

Henri Abadie (born 13 February 1963) is a French former professional racing cyclist. He rode in two editions of the Tour de France, two editions of the Giro d'Italia and one edition of the Vuelta a España.
