= René Beuker =

Dutch cyclist

Personal information
- Born: 15 May 1965 (age 61) Bussum, Netherlands

Cycling career
- Sport: Cycling
- Role: Rider

René Beuker (born 15 May 1965) is a former Dutch racing cyclist. He rode in seven Grand Tours between 1986 and 1991.
