= Ricardo Zúñiga Carrasco =

Spanish cyclist

Personal information
- Born: 17 September 1957 (age 69) Sabadell, Spain

Cycling career
- Sport: Cycling
- Discipline: Road
- Role: Rider

Professional teams
- 1979–1980: Colchón CR–Peña Hermanos
- 1981–1984: Reynolds
- 1985: Orbea–Gin MG
- 1986–1987: Colchón–CR

Ricardo Zúñiga Carrasco (born 17 September 1957) is a Spanish former professional racing cyclist. He rode in one edition of the Tour de France and eight editions of the Vuelta a España.

== Major results ==
1979
10th Overall Volta a Catalunya

1st Stage 5

1980
1st Stage 1 Vuelta a los Valles Mineros
1981
8th Overall Vuelta a Andalucía
10th Overall Volta a Catalunya
1983
3rd Clásica de Sabiñánigo
8th Overall Vuelta a Andalucía
