= Alfonso Gutiérrez =

Spanish cyclist

Personal information
- Born: 17 November 1961 (age 64) Lantueno, Spain

Cycling career
- Sport: Cycling
- Discipline: Road
- Role: Rider

Professional teams
- 1983–1989: Teka
- 1990: BH–Amaya Seguros
- 1991: Paternina–Don Zoilo
- 1992–1994: Artiach–Royal

Major wins
- Grand Tours Vuelta a España Points classification (1987) 3 individual stages (1986, 1987, 1993) One-day races and Classics National Road Race Championships (1986)

Alfonso Gutiérrez (born 17 November 1961) is a Spanish former professional racing cyclist. He rode in three editions of the Tour de France, one edition of the Giro d'Italia and seven editions of the Vuelta a España.

== Major results ==
1983
1st GP Pascuas
1st Stage 3 Vuelta a Castilla y León
1st Stage 5 Vuelta a Asturias
1st Stage 2a Vuelta a Cantabria
2nd Road race, National Road Championships
1984
1st Clásica de Sabiñánigo
Tour of Galicia

1st Stages 1 & 5

Vuelta a La Rioja

1st Stages 2 & 3a

1st Stage 2 Volta a Catalunya
1st Stage 1 Vuelta a Aragón
1st Stage 3 Setmana Catalana de Ciclisme
1st Stage 2 Vuelta a Burgos
1st Stage 2 Vuelta a los Valles Mineros
2nd Circuito de Getxo
1985
1st Stage 1 Volta a Catalunya
1st Stage 3a Vuelta a La Rioja
2nd Trofeo Masferrer
1986
1st Road race, National Road Championships
1st Overall Vuelta a Castilla y León

1st Stages 3, 4, 5 & 6

1st Stage 4 Vuelta a España
1st Stage 7a Paris–Nice
Vuelta a Burgos

1st Points classification
1st Stages 1, 2a, 3 & 5

Vuelta a Cantabria

1st Stages 1 & 4

6th Road race, UCI Road World Championships
1987
1st Overall Vuelta a Castilla y León

1st Stages 4, 7 & 9

Vuelta a España

1st Points classification
1st Stage 4

Vuelta a Cantabria

1st Stages 2 & 5b

1st Stage 6 Vuelta a Andalucía
1st Stage 2 Vuelta a La Rioja
2nd Road race, National Road Championships
1988
1st Clásica de Sabiñánigo
Volta a Catalunya

1st Points classification
1st Stage 2

1st Stage 3 Vuelta a Andalucía
1st Stage 5 Vuelta a Burgos
1989
Troféu Joaquim Agostinho

1st Stages 2 & 4

1st Stage 2 Vuelta a Castilla y León
1990
1st Overall Vuelta a La Rioja

1st Stage 4

Tour of Galicia

1st Stages 1 & 5

2nd Circuito de Getxo
6th Trofeo Masferrer
1991
Vuelta a Asturias

1st Stages 3 & 5

1st Stage 4 Volta a Catalunya
1st Stage 2 Setmana Catalana de Ciclisme
1st Stage 2 Tour of Galicia
3rd Overall Vuelta a Castilla y León
1992
Vuelta a Mallorca

1st Stages 3 & 4

1st Stage 2 Vuelta a Asturias
2nd Clásica de Almería
7th Circuito de Getxo
1993
1st Overall Vuelta a Aragón
1st Stage 2 Vuelta a España
1st Stage 1 Volta a la Comunitat Valenciana
1st Stage 3 Vuelta a Murcia
1st Stage 3 Vuelta a Castilla y León
1st Stage 3 Vuelta a Burgos
2nd Trofeo Masferrer
3rd Trofeo Luis Puig
1994
Vuelta a Mallorca

1st Stages 3a & 5

5th Clásica de Almería

=== Grand Tour general classification results timeline ===
Grand Tour	1986	1987	1988	1989	1990	1991	1992	1993
Vuelta a España	103	88	73	—	86	84	131	89
Giro d'Italia	—	—	—	—	—	—	—	—
Tour de France	DNF	DNF	DNF	—	—	—	—	—

Legend
—	Did not compete
DNF	Did not finish
