= Éric Guyot =

French cyclist

Personal information
- Born: 10 March 1962 (age 64) Belfort, France

Cycling career
- Sport: Cycling
- Role: Rider

Éric Guyot (French: [eʁik ɡɥijo]; born 10 March 1962) is a French former professional racing cyclist. He rode in one edition of the Tour de France and four editions of the Vuelta a España.
