= Omar Hernández =

Colombian cyclist

Personal information
- Born: 20 January 1962 (age 64) Bogotá, Colombia

Cycling career
- Sport: Cycling
- Role: Rider

Major wins
- Grand Tours Vuelta a España Young Rider Classification (1986) 1 individual stage (1987)

Omar Hernández (born 20 January 1962) is a former Colombian racing cyclist. He rode in eleven Grand Tours between 1986 and 1991.
