= Roberto Pagnin =

Italian cyclist

Personal information
- Born: 8 July 1962 (age 64) Vigonovo, Italy
- Height: 1.78 m (5 ft 10 in)
- Weight: 74 kg (163 lb)

Cycling career
- Sport: Cycling
- Discipline: Road
- Role: Rider
- Rider type: Sprinter

Amateur teams
- 1982–1983: Quarella Marmi
- 1984: Isal Tessari

Professional teams
- 1985–1986: Malvor–Bottecchia–Vaporella
- 1987–1988: Gewiss–Bianchi
- 1989–1990: Malvor–Sidi
- 1992–1992: Lotus–Festina
- 1993–1994: Navigare–Blue Storm
- 1995: ZG Mobili–Selle Italia
- 1996: Force Sud

Major wins
- Grand Tours Giro d'Italia 1 individual stage (1992) Vuelta a España 3 individual stages (1987, 1989)

Roberto Pagnin (born 8 July 1962) is an Italian former professional racing cyclist. He rode in one edition of the Tour de France, ten editions of the Giro d'Italia and five editions of the Vuelta a España. He also rode in the individual road race at the 1984 Summer Olympics.

== Major results ==
1978
1st Coppa d'Oro
1980
1st Stage 1 Giro della Lunigiana
1982
2nd Piccolo Giro di Lombardia
1983
2nd Giro del Belvedere
1984
1st Trofeo Piva
1st Coppa San Geo
1st Stage 3 Giro delle Regioni
1st Stage 4 Girobio
4th Gran Premio della Liberazione
1985
5th GP du canton d'Argovie
6th Giro dell'Umbria
1986
1st Overall Giro di Puglia

1st Stage 5

1st Stage 5 Tirreno–Adriatico
2nd Giro dell'Umbria
3rd Trofeo Laigueglia
3rd Tre Valli Varesine
3rd Milano–Vignola
5th GP Industria & Commercio di Prato
8th Liège–Bastogne–Liège
1987
1st Giro del Lazio
1st Stages 5 & 17 Vuelta a España
3rd Giro del Friuli
3rd Giro di Toscana
4th Gent–Wevelgem
6th Trofeo Baracchi
7th Firenze–Pistoia
1988
7th Trofeo Baracchi
1989
1st Giro del Veneto
1st Stage 4 Vuelta a España
5th Giro di Lombardia
6th Giro dell'Etna
9th Trofeo Baracchi
1990
3rd Giro di Toscana
7th Giro del Veneto
8th Giro dell'Etna
1991
1st Giro del Veneto
1st Stage 3 Vuelta a Murcia
1st Stage 1 Vuelta Ciclista a la Comunidad Valenciana
3rd Trofeo Luis Puig
1992
1st Stage 10 Giro d'Italia
1st Stage 9 Tour de Suisse
1993
1st Stage 3 Setmana Catalana de Ciclisme
5th Giro di Romagna
1994
1st Stage 8 Tirreno–Adriatico
4th Coppa Bernocchi
