= Enrique Aja =

Spanish cyclist (born 1960)

Personal information
- Full name: Enrique Alberto Aja Cagigas
- Born: 23 March 1960 (age 66) Solares, Spain

Cycling career
- Sport: Cycling
- Role: Rider

Enrique Alberto Aja Cagigas (born 23 March 1960) is a Spanish former professional racing cyclist. He rode in six editions of the Tour de France and eight editions of the Vuelta a España.
