= Yvon Madiot =

French cyclist

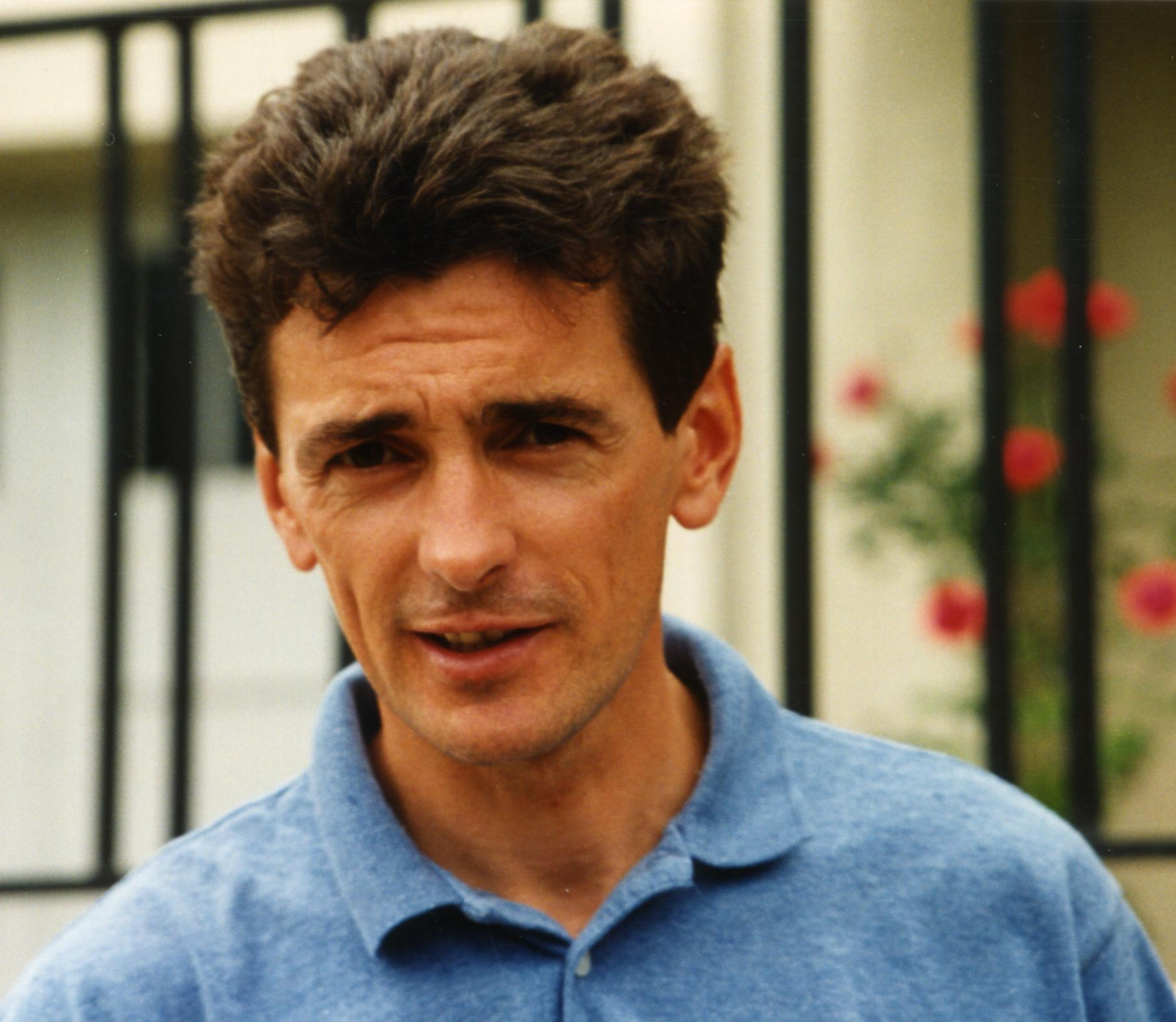
- Yvon Madiot

Personal information
- Full name: Yvon Madiot
- Born: 21 June 1962 (age 64) Renazé, France

Cycling career
- Sport: Cycling
- Disciplines: Road; Cyclo-cross
- Role: Rider (retired); Directeur sportif

Amateur teams
- 1976–1982: CC Renazé
- 1982–1983: CC Châteaubriant

Professional teams
- 1983–1985: Renault–Elf
- 1986–1987: Système U
- 1988–1990: Toshiba–Look
- 1991: RMO
- 1992: Team Telekom
- 1993: Subaru–Montgomery
- 1994: Catavana–AS Corbeil–Essonnes–Cedico

Managerial team
- 1997–: Française des Jeux

Yvon Madiot (French: [ivɔ̃ madjo]; born 21 June 1962) is a French former racing cyclist. He won the French national road race title in 1986, going on to finish tenth in that year's Tour de France.

He is the younger brother of fellow retired racing cyclist and double winner of Paris–Roubaix, Marc Madiot, and works alongside Marc as part of the management of the Groupama–FDJ cycling team as an assistant sports director. He has played a particularly important role in developing young riders, mentoring Arthur Vichot, Jérémy Roy, Cédric Pineau, Mathieu Ladagnous, Mickaël Delage, Arnaud Démare and William Bonnet, among others.

== Major results ==
=== Road ===
1983
1st Stage 10 Course de la Paix
1st Stage 5 Tour de Normandie
5th Overall Tour de l'Avenir
1984
1st Grand Prix de Cannes
1985
2nd Chanteloup-les-Vignes
3rd Grand Prix de Plumelec
5th La Flèche Wallonne
5th Overall Settimana Internazionale di Coppi e Bartali
9th Paris–Camembert
1986
1st Road race, National Road Championships
7th Bordeaux–Paris
7th Grand Prix de Cannes
8th Overall Paris–Nice
9th Tour of Flanders
10th Overall Tour de France
1987
2nd Boucles Parisiennes
4th Liège–Bastogne–Liège
4th Overall Tour Midi-Pyrénées
5th La Flèche Wallonne
6th Grand Prix de Wallonie
7th Gent–Wevelgem
8th Overall Vuelta a España
8th Overall Tour du Haut Var
1988
4th Overall Grand Prix du Midi Libre
5th Grand Prix des Amériques
7th La Flèche Wallonne
9th Overall Critérium du Dauphiné Libéré
1989
2nd Grand Prix des Amériques
5th Giro dell'Emilia
9th Overall Grand Prix du Midi Libre
9th Kuurne–Brussels–Kuurne
1990
3rd Giro dell'Emilia
4th GP de Fourmies
7th GP Ouest–France
1991
1st Grand Prix de Cannes
1992
9th Overall Four Days of Dunkirk

==== Grand Tour general classification results timeline ====
Grand Tour	1984	1985	1986	1987	1988	1989	1990	1991	1992
Vuelta a España	—	—	14	8	—	—	43	—	—
Giro d'Italia	—	—	—	—	—	—	—	—	—
Tour de France	46	72	10	73	DNF	47	DNF	DNF	67

=== Cyclo-cross ===
1984
1st National Championships
1985
1st National Championships
1986
1st Cyclo-cross du Mingant
2nd National Championships
1987
1st National Championships
1988
1st Cyclo-cross du Mingant
3rd National Championships
