= Zahor Chocolates =

Spanish professional cycling team (1985-89)

Team information
- UCI code: ZAH
- Registered: Spain
- Founded: 1985
- Disbanded: 1989
- Discipline: Road
- Status: Retired
- Bicycles: Campagnolo (1985); Macario (1986–1989)

Key personnel
- General manager: Miguel Moreno Cachinero

Team name history
- 1985–1988 1989: Zahor Chocolates; Lotus - Zahor

Zahor Chocolates was a Spanish professional cycling team that was active between 1985 and 1989.

== History ==
The team was led primarily by Miguel Moreno Cachinero, who led the team for four years. They were primarily supplied bikes by Macario, with the exception of the first season in 1985. The team's most successful race was the Vuelta a España, where they won a total of four stages. For the 1987 Giro d'Italia the team was renamed Zahor Chocolates-Tokke, when Tokke became a co-sponsor. The team was also briefly renamed to Zahor Chocolates-Pralin for the 1988 Giro d'Italia, with the acquisition of the sponsor Pralin.

== Major wins ==
=== Grand Tours ===
==== Vuelta a España ====
- 4 stages (2 in 1986, 1 in 1987, 1 in 1989)

=== Other races ===
2 stages in the Vuelta a Murcia (1 stage in 1985, 1 stage in 1987)
