= Postobón (cycling team) =

Team information
- Registered: Colombia
- Founded: 1986
- Disbanded: 1996
- Discipline: Road

Team name history
- 1986–1988 1989 1990–1992 1993–1996: Postobón–Manzana / Postobón–Ryalcao (Europe); Postobón–Manzana; Postobón–Manzana–Ryalcao; Postobón–Manzana

Postobón was a Colombian based professional road bicycle racing cycling team active from 1986 to 1996. The team was sponsored by the Colombian beverage manufacturers Postobón. The team name was sometimes Manzana–Postobón after one of the most popular drinks that the beverage manufacturer produced.

The team came into existence the year after the creation of the Café de Colombia-Pilas Varta-Mavic. The first manager of the Café de Colombia team was José Raúl Meza Orozco but he joined Postóbon. Asdrubal Salazar, Elkin Dario Rendón Rojas, José Alfonso López Lemus and Narsutis Dumbauskas would be involved in the managing of the team of the ten years of its existence.

Luis Herrera rode the last two years of his career with the team. Chepe González, a stage winner in the Tour de France and Giro d'Italia began his career with the team. The team obtained success and challenged the dominance of Café de Colombia in the Vuelta a Colombia with Pablo Wilches, Gustavo Wilches and José González. On February 22, 1995, three cyclists of the team - Néstor Mora, Hernán Patiño and Augusto Triana were killed while training on a highway in Colombia when they were hit by a truck.

== Major wins ==
1986
Stage Vuelta a Colombia
1987
General classification and one stage Vuelta a Colombia
Stage Clásico RCN
1988
General classification Clásica Ciudad de Girardot
General classification Vuelta a Boyacà
Two stages Clásico RCN
1989
Mountains classification and one stage Vuelta a España
Stage Clásico RCN
1990
Stage Vuelta a España
Stage 7 Dauphiné Libéré
Stage 2 Vuelta a Venezuela
General classification Vuelta a El Salvador
General classification Clásico RCN
1991
General classification and one stage Dauphiné Libéré
Stage 6 Volta a Catalunya
Mountains classification and Stage 16 Vuelta a España
1992
General classification Clásico RCN
General classification Vuelta a los valles Mineros
General classification Vuelta a Costa Rica
General classification Vuelta Ciclista an Aragón
General classification and one stage Route du Sud
General classification Vuelta Ciclista a Murcia
Stage 7 Dauphiné Libéré

1994

Stage Clásico RCN
1995
National Colombia road race championships (Efraín Rico)
General classification and one stage Ruta Mexico
Stage Clásico RCN
1996
Stage wins Vuelta a Colombia
