= Système U (cycling team) =

French professional cycling team (1986–1988)

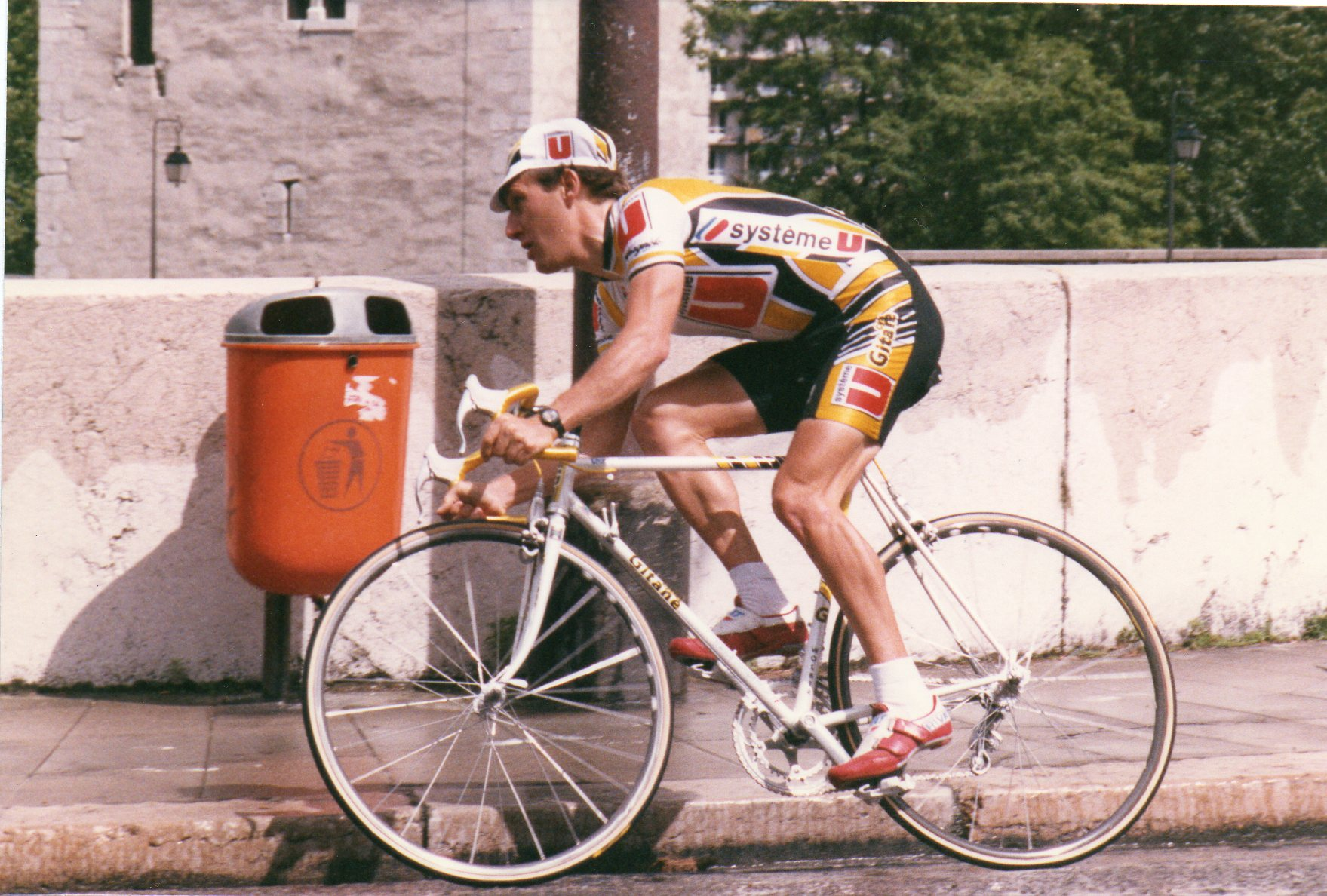
- Charly Mottet at the 1988 Critérium du Dauphiné libéré

Team information
- UCI code: SUG
- Registered: France
- Founded: 1986
- Disbanded: 1989
- Disciplines: Road; Cyclo-cross
- Status: Retired

Key personnel
- General manager: Cyrille Guimard

Team name history
- 1986–1987 1988 1989: Système U Système U–Gitane; Super U–Raleigh–Fiat

Système U (UCI team code: SUG) was a French professional cycling team that existed from 1986 to 1988 and rode Gitane racing bikes. In 1989 the team was renamed Super U–Raleigh–Fiat and rode Raleigh bicycles. Super U was a chain of supermarkets owned by the Système U group.

== History ==
A Système U team existed during the 1984 season (see Wolber–Spidel) with Marcel Boishardy as manager and was a continuation of the Wolber–Spidel team from the 1983 season. This team included riders such as Jean-René Bernaudeau and Colombian Martín Ramírez Ramírez. The sponsor Système U decided to take over the sponsorship of the highly successful Renault–Elf–Gitane team when Renault decided to retire from the peloton.

Renault–Elf–Gitane which was directed by former French cycling champion Cyrille Guimard dominated the Tour de France between 1978 and 1984. The 1986 season started well with Laurent Fignon winning the spring semi-classic La Flèche Wallonne and Thierry Marie winning the prologue of the 1986 Tour de France.

Marie wore the yellow jersey as leader of the general classification for several days as the team also won the Team time trial of that year's Tour but the best for the general classification was the 10th place of French Champion Yvon Madiot.

The following year, the team achieved success with Charly Mottet who won the Critérium du Dauphiné Libéré stage race and then wore the yellow jersey as leader of the general classification for several days in the 1987 Tour de France and finished fourth overall. The team won the team classification of that Tour. Mottet also won the Individual time trial classic at the end of the season, the Grand Prix des Nations.

In 1988, Fignon showed good form to win the Milan–San Remo Classic as well as the stage race the Tour de l'Avenir while Mottet won the Giro di Lombardia. In 1989, the team was renamed Super U after one of the supermarkets that the Système U cooperative owned and Gitane cycles stopped their long association with Guimard's team. Raleigh cycles took their place and became the second sponsor as well.

The year marked Fignon's return to form with a second win in Milan–San Remo, a win in the 1989 Giro d'Italia and the closest ever second place in the history of the Tour de France in the 1989 Tour de France. During this time Cyrille Guimard was the main directeur sportif with Bernard Quilfen and Jacques Cadicou being the other directeur sportifs. After Système U decided to withdraw sponsorship, Castorama a French retailer of DIY and home improvement supplies took over as main sponsor making the Castorama cycling team.

== Notable riders ==
Riders who have won a Grand Tour, held the leader's jersey of a Grand Tour, won a stage of a Grand Tour, won a classic or won a national championship. Their wins may have been at any time in their careers, not necessarily during their time in the Système U team:

- Laurent Fignon
- Charly Mottet
- Éric Boyer
- Yvon Madiot
- Marc Madiot
- Thierry Marie
- Christophe Lavainne
- Martial Gayant
- Jacky Durand
- Bjarne Riis
- Pascal Simon

== Major wins ==
- Giro d'Italia General classification 1989
- France Cyclo Cross Championship 1986, 1987, 1988
- France Road Race Championship 1986, 1987
- Milan–San Remo 1988, 1989
- Giro di Lombardia 1988
- La Flèche Wallonne 1986
- Tour de l'Avenir 1988
- Paris–Bourges General classification 1986
- Grand Prix Eddy Merckx 1986
- Grand Prix des Nations 1987, 1988, 1989
- Critérium du Dauphiné Libéré General classification 1987
- GP Ouest-France 1986
- Paris–Camembert 1988
- Ronde van Nederland 1988, 1989
- Tour du Haut Var 1989
