= Café de Colombia =

Colombian road bicycle racing team

Team information
- UCI code: CAF
- Registered: Colombia
- Founded: 1983
- Disbanded: 1990
- Discipline: Road

Team name history
- 1983 1984 1985 1986–1987 1988–1990: Varta–Colombia; Varta–Café de Colombia; Varta–Café de Colombia–Mavic; Café de Colombia–Varta; Café de Colombia
Café de Colombia jersey
Jersey

Café de Colombia (UCI team code: CAF) was a Colombian based professional road bicycle racing Cycling team active from 1983 to 1990. The team was sponsored by the Colombian coffee growers Federación Nacional de Cafeteros de Colombia.

== History ==
The team came into existence just as Colombian cyclists were achieving successes in Europe. This started with a Colombian National Cycling team entering and winning the Tour de l'Avenir in 1980 with Alfonso Flórez. The 1983 Tour de France was the first time that the race was "open" to accommodate amateurs to compete. As a result, the Colombian cyclists were able to compete in a Colombian national cycling team. The following year the Colombian national team, with sponsorship from VARTA batteries, returned to the 1984 Tour de France where Luis Herrera, still an amateur, won the stage to the Alpe d'Huez. After these successes, a professional cycling team was set up that would give contracts and a chance of success in Europe to Colombian cyclists. In 1985 this team was called Varta–Café de Colombia–Mavic and had as manager José Raúl Meza Orozco. The team was composed of 24 riders from Colombia, 20 of which Café de Colombia had given them their first professional contracts, which included Luis Herrera and Fabio Parra.

The following year Raphaël Géminiani was team manager together with Jorge Humberto Tenjo Porras. In 1987 the team, under the guidance of team manager Rafael Antonio Niño and directeur sportif Roberto Sánchez, obtained perhaps its greatest success in 1987 when Luis Herrera won the Vuelta a España. Pedro Pablo Valdivieso Ayala and José Gabriel Castro Medina would also be directeur sportifs with the team. The team stopped after 1990.

== Major wins ==
1985
Stage 8 Tour de l'Avenir
Stage 7 Vuelta a España
Stage 11, 14 and Mountains classification 1985 Tour de France
Stage 3 Dauphiné Libéré
General classification Clásico RCN
1986
General classification Vuelta a la Costa
General classification Clásico RCN
1987
Stage 6 Dauphiné Libéré
General classification Clásico RCN
General classification, one stage and Mountains classification Vuelta a España
1988
General classification Dauphiné Libéré
Clasico Centenario de Armenia
Stage 1 Vuelta Americas
Stage 2 part b Vuelta al Táchira
Stage 3, 7a and General classification Postgirot Open
General classification Tour of the Americas
1990
Clasica Duitama
