= List of teams and cyclists in the 1988 Vuelta a España =

For the 1988 Vuelta a España, the field consisted of 180 riders; 116 finished the race.

== By rider ==
Legend
No.	Starting number worn by the rider during the Vuelta
Pos.	Position in the general classification
Time	Deficit to the winner of the general classification
DNF	Denotes a rider who did not finish

No.	Name	Nationality	Team	Pos.	Time	Ref
1	Luis Herrera	Colombia	Café de Colombia	20	+ 26' 42"	
2	Martín Ramírez	Colombia	Café de Colombia	16	+ 18' 36"	
3	José Antonio Agudelo Gómez	Colombia	Café de Colombia	44	+ 1' 03' 04"	
4	Julio César Cadena	Colombia	Café de Colombia	57	+ 1' 22' 25"	
5	Argemiro Bohórquez	Colombia	Café de Colombia	DNF	—	
6	Henry Cárdenas	Colombia	Café de Colombia	DNF	—	
7	Samuel Cabrera	Colombia	Café de Colombia	DNF	—	
8	Marco Antonio León	Colombia	Café de Colombia	DNF	—	
9	Rubén Darío Beltrán Pérez	Colombia	Café de Colombia	DNF	—	
10	Rafael Acevedo	Colombia	Café de Colombia	DNF	—	
11	Álvaro Pino	Spain	BH	8	+ 8' 25"	
12	Anselmo Fuerte	Spain	BH	3	+ 1' 29"	
13	Federico Echave	Spain	BH	13	+ 13' 44"	
14	Manuel Jorge Domínguez	Spain	BH	56	+ 1' 21' 09"	
15	Fernando Quevedo	Spain	BH	99	+ 2' 11' 54"	
16	Laudelino Cubino	Spain	BH	4	+ 2' 17"	
17	Jørgen Pedersen	Denmark	BH	43	+ 1' 01' 29"	
18	Roberto Córdoba Asensi	Spain	BH	10	+ 10' 28"	
19	Philippe Bouvatier	France	BH	DNF	—	
20	Francisco Antequera	Spain	BH	81	+ 1' 47' 11"	
21	Marino Lejarreta	Spain	Caja Rural–Orbea	DNF	—	
22	Jokin Mújika	Spain	Caja Rural–Orbea	14	+ 14' 56"	
23	Mathieu Hermans	Netherlands	Caja Rural–Orbea	106	+ 2' 31' 52"	
24	Imanol Murga	Spain	Caja Rural–Orbea	70	+ 1' 34' 20"	
25	Roque de la Cruz	Spain	Caja Rural–Orbea	45	+ 1' 03' 27"	
26	Roland Le Clerc	France	Caja Rural–Orbea	91	+ 1h 59' 30"	
27	René Beuker	Netherlands	Caja Rural–Orbea	102	+ 2' 21' 13"	
28	Erwin Nijboer	Netherlands	Caja Rural–Orbea	111	+ 2' 38' 32"	
29	Juan Maria Eguiarte Soleagui	Spain	Caja Rural–Orbea	83	+ 1' 54' 43"	
30	Vicente Ridaura	Spain	Caja Rural–Orbea	24	+ 37' 05"	
31	Sean Kelly	Ireland	Kas–Canal 10	1	89h 19' 23"	
32	Pello Ruiz Cabestany	Spain	Kas–Canal 10	23	+ 36' 11"	
33	Acácio da Silva	Portugal	Kas–Canal 10	38	+ 54' 51"	
34	Éric Caritoux	France	Kas–Canal 10	11	+ 12' 37"	
35	Jon Unzaga	Spain	Kas–Canal 10	47	+ 1' 09' 48"	
36	Guido Van Calster	Belgium	Kas–Canal 10	50	+ 1' 14' 46"	
37	Celestino Prieto	Spain	Kas–Canal 10	DNF	—	
38	Thomas Wegmüller	Switzerland	Kas–Canal 10	DNF	—	
39	Martin Earley	Ireland	Kas–Canal 10	19	+ 25' 27"	
40	Jesús Montoya	Spain	Kas–Canal 10	104	+ 2' 25' 13"	
41	Fabio Parra	Colombia	Kelme	5	+ 2' 25"	
42	Iñaki Gastón	Spain	Kelme	35	+ 52' 24"	
43	Vicente Belda	Spain	Kelme	68	+ 1' 30' 53"	
44	Eduardo Chozas	Spain	Kelme	67	+ 1' 30' 14"	
45	Antonio Coll	Spain	Kelme	89	+ 1' 56' 41"	
46	José Recio	Spain	Kelme	40	+ 56' 56"	
47	José Hipolito Roncancio	Colombia	Kelme	59	+ 1' 23' 58"	
48	Juan Martínez Oliver	Spain	Kelme	75	+ 1' 37' 35"	
49	Jaime Vilamajó	Spain	Kelme	86	+ 1' 55' 31"	
50	Manuel Guijarro Doménech	Spain	Kelme	DNF	—	
51	Julián Gorospe	Spain	Reynolds	39	+ 56' 53"	
52	Ángel Arroyo	Spain	Reynolds	DNF	—	
53	Miguel Induráin	Spain	Reynolds	DNF	—	
54	José Luis Laguía	Spain	Reynolds	17	+ 18' 40"	
55	William Palacio	Colombia	Reynolds	12	+ 13' 30"	
56	Rubén Gorospe	Spain	Reynolds	85	+ 1' 55' 20"	
57	Jesús Hernández Úbeda	Spain	Reynolds	DNF	—	
58	José Enrique Carrera	Spain	Reynolds	97	+ 2' 10' 33"	
59	Pedro Díaz Zabala	Spain	Reynolds	65	+ 1' 29' 32"	
60	Luis Javier Lukin	Spain	Reynolds	60	+ 1' 24' 48"	
61	Reimund Dietzen	West Germany	Teka	2	+ 1' 27"	
62	Jesús Blanco Villar	Spain	Teka	7	+ 8' 19"	
63	Peter Hilse	West Germany	Teka	46	+ 1' 03' 44"	
64	Marino Alonso	Spain	Teka	DNF	—	
65	Carlos Hernández Bailo	Spain	Teka	27	+ 43' 07"	
66	Enrique Aja	Spain	Teka	DNF	—	
67	José Fernando Pacheco Sáez	Spain	Teka	74	+ 1' 36' 59"	
68	Ángel Sarrapio	Spain	Teka	DNF	—	
69	Alfonso Gutiérrez	Spain	Teka	73	+ 1' 36' 15"	
70	Mariano Sánchez Martinez	Spain	Teka	18	+ 19' 35"	
71	Robert Millar	Great Britain	Boss–Fagor	6	+ 3' 22"	
72	Pedro Muñoz Machín Rodríguez	Spain	Boss–Fagor	DNF	—	
73	Jean-Claude Bagot	France	Boss–Fagor	29	+ 44' 28"	
74	Eddy Schepers	Belgium	Boss–Fagor	9	+ 9' 45"	
75	Malcolm Elliott	Great Britain	Boss–Fagor	76	+ 1' 38' 06"	
76	Sean Yates	Great Britain	Boss–Fagor	71	+ 1' 34' 40"	
77	Marc Gomez	France	Boss–Fagor	66	+ 1' 29' 37"	
78	Bernard Richard	France	Boss–Fagor	28	+ 43' 13"	
79	Johnny Weltz	Denmark	Boss–Fagor	53	+ 1' 17' 21"	
80	John Carlsen	Denmark	Boss–Fagor	105	+ 2' 31' 38"	
81	Paul Haghedooren	Belgium	Boss–Fagor	34	+ 49' 37"	
82	Roger Ilegems	Belgium	Sigma–Dormilon	113	+ 2' 52' 23"	
83	Wilfried Peeters	Belgium	Sigma–Dormilon	95	+ 2' 07' 08"	
84	Willem Wijnant	Belgium	Sigma–Dormilon	112	+ 2' 48' 01"	
85	Philippe Boulanger	France	Sigma–Dormilon	DNF	—	
86	Eddy Vanhaerens	Belgium	Sigma–Dormilon	115	+ 2' 55' 06"	
87	Rik Van Slycke	Belgium	Sigma–Dormilon	DNF	—	
88	Walter Dalgal	Belgium	Sigma–Dormilon	DNF	—	
89	Ludwig Wijnants	Belgium	Sigma–Dormilon	DNF	—	
90	André Meuwissen	Belgium	Sigma–Dormilon	108	+ 2' 35' 15"	
91	Francisco Javier Quevedo Prades	Spain	CLAS	DNF	—	
92	Casimiro Moreda	Spain	CLAS	49	+ 1' 14' 01"	
93	Américo José Neves Da Silva	Portugal	CLAS	DNF	—	
94	Manuel Cunha	Portugal	CLAS	30	+ 44' 54"	
95	Jesús Rodríguez Carballido	Spain	CLAS	DNF	—	
96	Javier Duch Ballester	Spain	CLAS	79	+ 1' 45' 46"	
97	Francisco Javier Ochaíta Sanz	Spain	CLAS	DNF	—	
98	Carlos Muñiz Menéndez	Spain	CLAS	31	+ 45' 44"	
99	Jesús Ignacio Alonso Ortega	Spain	CLAS	80	+ 1' 45' 56"	
100	Jesús Cruz Martín	Spain	CLAS	DNF	—	
101	Miguel Ángel Iglesias	Spain	Helios CR	88	+ 1' 56' 08"	
102	Felipe Yáñez	Spain	Helios CR	DNF	—	
103	José Julián Balaguer Albamonte	Spain	Helios CR	58	+ 1' 23' 36"	
104	Juan Ramón Martín	Spain	Helios CR	107	+ 2' 33' 35"	
105	Jose Antonio Miralles	Spain	Helios CR	DNF	—	
106	José Del Ramo Nunez	Spain	Helios CR	DNF	—	
107	Jose Ignacio Moratinos	Spain	Helios CR	DNF	—	
108	Jesús Rodríguez Rodríguez	Spain	Helios CR	52	+ 1' 16' 03"	
109	José Antonio Casajus Cabrera	Spain	Helios CR	101	+ 2' 17' 37"	
110	Francisco López Gonzalvo	Spain	Helios CR	DNF	—	
111	Noël Dejonckheere	Belgium	Seur–Campagnolo–Bic	DNF	—	
112	Javier Castellar	Spain	Seur–Campagnolo–Bic	37	+ 53' 25"	
113	Jean-Jacques Philipp	France	Seur–Campagnolo–Bic	116	+ 3' 05' 08"	
114	Leo Wellens	Belgium	Seur–Campagnolo–Bic	DNF	—	
115	Antonio Provencio García	Spain	Seur–Campagnolo–Bic	109	+ 2' 35' 21"	
116	Modesto Urrutibeazcoa	Spain	Seur–Campagnolo–Bic	103	+ 2' 22' 16"	
117	José Rafael García Martínez	Spain	Seur–Campagnolo–Bic	78	+ 1' 44' 34"	
118	Francisco Navarro Fuster	Spain	Seur–Campagnolo–Bic	114	+ 2' 54' 25"	
119	Juan Gomila Alcaraz	Spain	Seur–Campagnolo–Bic	DNF	—	
120	Pablo Moreno Rebollo	Spain	Seur–Campagnolo–Bic	110	+ 2' 37' 58"	
121	Luc Suykerbuyk	Netherlands	Zahor	22	+ 35' 45"	
122	Juan Fernández Martín	Spain	Zahor	DNF	—	
123	Manuel Carrera Punzón	Spain	Zahor	51	+ 1' 15' 10"	
124	Benny Van Brabant	Belgium	Zahor	54	+ 1' 18' 31"	
125	Juan Tomás Martínez Gutiérrez	Spain	Zahor	25	+ 39' 18"	
126	Ángel Ocaña	Spain	Zahor	33	+ 47' 22"	
127	Juan Martin Zapatero Marcos	Spain	Zahor	72	+ 1' 36' 14"	
128	Antonio Martínez Martínez	Spain	Zahor	DNF	—	
129	Roberto Torres	Spain	Zahor	90	+ 1' 59' 00"	
130	Santiago Portillo Rosado	Spain	Zahor	48	+ 1' 10' 31"	
131	Francisco Rodríguez Maldonado	Colombia	Postobón–Manzana–Ryalcao	DNF	—	
132	Óscar Vargas	Colombia	Postobón–Manzana–Ryalcao	DNF	—	
133	Pedro Saúl Morales	Colombia	Postobón–Manzana–Ryalcao	DNF	—	
134	Héctor Julio Patarroyo	Colombia	Postobón–Manzana–Ryalcao	DNF	—	
135	Victor Hugo Olarte Cortes	Colombia	Postobón–Manzana–Ryalcao	87	+ 1' 55' 52"	
136	Néstor Mora	Colombia	Postobón–Manzana–Ryalcao	42	+ 1' 00' 26"	
137	Carlos Jaramillo	Colombia	Postobón–Manzana–Ryalcao	21	+ 27' 15"	
138	Luis Fernando Mosquera Restredo	Colombia	Postobón–Manzana–Ryalcao	94	+ 2' 06' 53"	
139	Gerardo Moncada	Colombia	Postobón–Manzana–Ryalcao	DNF	—	
140	Pablo Wilches	Colombia	Postobón–Manzana–Ryalcao	DNF	—	
141	Luis Alberto González	Colombia	Pony Malta	DNF	—	
142	Reynel Montoya	Colombia	Pony Malta	DNF	—	
143	Manuel Cárdenas Espitia	Colombia	Pony Malta	DNF	—	
144	José Alirio Chizabas Torres	Colombia	Pony Malta	41	+ 1' 00' 02"	
145	Lino Casas	Colombia	Pony Malta	DNF	—	
146	Elio Villamizar	Colombia	Pony Malta	DNF	—	
147	Celio Roncancio	Colombia	Pony Malta	DNF	—	
148	Álvaro Lozano	Colombia	Pony Malta	55	+ 1' 19' 02"	
149	Rafael Tolosa	Colombia	Pony Malta	61	+ 1' 25' 49"	
150	Ramon Tolosa	Colombia	Pony Malta	DNF	—	
151	Stefano Colagè	Italy	Alba Cucine	DNF	—	
152	Marco Franceschini	Italy	Alba Cucine	96	+ 2' 09' 53"	
153	Flavio Chesini	Italy	Alba Cucine	DNF	—	
154	Rodolfo Massi	Italy	Alba Cucine	36	+ 53' 07"	
155	Sauro Varocchi	Italy	Alba Cucine	DNF	—	
156	Mauro-Antonio Santaromita	Italy	Alba Cucine	32	+ 46' 09"	
157	Alessandro Giannelli	Italy	Alba Cucine	DNF	—	
158	Claudio Savini	Italy	Alba Cucine	63	+ 1' 27' 11"	
159	Micol Gianelli	Italy	Alba Cucine	DNF	—	
160	Félipe Enríquez	Mexico	Alba Cucine	DNF	—	
161	Eduardo Manuel Correia	Portugal	Sicasal–Torrense	DNF	—	
162	Antonio Joaquim De Castro Oliveira Pinto	Portugal	Sicasal–Torrense	62	+ 1' 26' 20"	
163	Fernando Fernandes	Portugal	Sicasal–Torrense	DNF	—	
164	Joao Manuel Santos	Portugal	Sicasal–Torrense	DNF	—	
165	Alexandre Manuel Costa Rua	Portugal	Sicasal–Torrense	93	+ 2' 02' 18"	
166	Paulo Jorge Silva	Portugal	Sicasal–Torrense	69	+ 1' 33' 17"	
167	Manuel De Sa Neves	Portugal	Sicasal–Torrense	92	+ 2' 00' 35"	
168	Antonino Araujo	Portugal	Sicasal–Torrense	84	+ 1' 55' 06"	
169	Jose Poeira	Portugal	Sicasal–Torrense	DNF	—	
170	Paulo de Oliveira Pinto	Portugal	Sicasal–Torrense	98	+ 2' 11' 16"	
171	Ettore Pastorelli	Italy	Carrera Jeans–Vagabond	DNF	—	
172	Marco Franco Votolo	Italy	Carrera Jeans–Vagabond	15	+ 18' 21"	
173	Mario Chiesa	Italy	Carrera Jeans–Vagabond	82	+ 1' 50' 24"	
174	Primož Čerin	Yugoslavia	Carrera Jeans–Vagabond	DNF	—	
175	Fabio Bordonali	Italy	Carrera Jeans–Vagabond	64	+ 1' 28' 56"	
176	Claudio Chiappucci	Italy	Carrera Jeans–Vagabond	26	+ 42' 14"	
177	Francesco Rossignoli	Italy	Carrera Jeans–Vagabond	DNF	—	
178	Deno Davie	Great Britain	Carrera Jeans–Vagabond	100	+ 2' 12' 07"	
179	Marco Bergamo	Italy	Carrera Jeans–Vagabond	77	+ 1' 44' 27"	
180	Raimondo Vairetti	Italy	Carrera Jeans–Vagabond	DNF	—	
