= 1988 Vuelta a España, Stage 1 to Stage 11 =

Cycling race stages

The 1988 Vuelta a España was the 43rd edition of the Vuelta a España, one of cycling's Grand Tours. The Vuelta began in Santa Cruz de Tenerife, with an individual time trial on 25 April. Stage 11 took place on 5 May and ended in Valdezcaray. The race finished in Madrid on 15 May.

== Stage 1 ==
25 April 1988 — Santa Cruz de Tenerife to Santa Cruz de Tenerife, 17.4 km (10.8 mi) (ITT)

Stage 1 result and general classification after Stage 1

Rank	Rider	Team	Time
1	Ettore Pastorelli (ITA)	Carrera Jeans–Vagabond	19' 58"
2	Modesto Urrutibeazcoa (ESP)	Seur–Campagnolo–Bic	s.t.
3	Francisco Javier Quevedo (ESP)	CLAS	s.t.
4	José Recio (ESP)	Kelme	s.t.
5	Stefano Colagè (ITA)	Alba–Cucine	s.t.
6	Paulo Jorge Silva (POR)	Sicasal–Torrense	s.t.
7	Sean Kelly (IRL)	Kas–Canal 10	s.t.
8	Claudio Chiappucci (ITA)	Carrera Jeans–Vagabond	s.t.
9	Noël Dejonckheere (BEL)	Seur–Campagnolo–Bic	s.t.
10	Miguel Ángel Iglesias (ESP)	Helios CR	s.t.

== Stage 2 ==
26 April 1988 — San Cristóbal de La Laguna to Santa Cruz de Tenerife, 210 km (130 mi)

Stage 2 result

Rank	Rider	Team	Time
1	Iñaki Gastón (ESP)	Kelme	5h 25' 41"
2	Jokin Mújika (ESP)	Caja Rural–Orbea	s.t.
3	Laudelino Cubino (ESP)	BH	+ 3"
4	Reimund Dietzen (FRG)	Teka	+ 1' 14"
5	Manuel Jorge Domínguez (ESP)	BH	s.t.
6	Eddy Schepers (BEL)	Fagor–MBK	s.t.
7	Jesús Blanco Villar (ESP)	Teka	s.t.
8	Sean Kelly (IRL)	Kas–Canal 10	s.t.
9	Álvaro Pino (ESP)	BH	s.t.
10	Jesús Rodríguez Rodríguez (ESP)	Helios CR	s.t.

General classification after Stage 2

Rank	Rider	Team	Time
1	Laudelino Cubino (ESP)	BH	5h 45' 26"
2	Iñaki Gastón (ESP)	Kelme	+ 52"
3	Jokin Mújika (ESP)	Caja Rural–Orbea	+ 54"
4	Sean Kelly (IRL)	Kas–Canal 10	+ 1' 27"
5	Reimund Dietzen (FRG)	Teka	s.t.
6	Álvaro Pino (ESP)	BH	s.t.
7	Marino Lejarreta (ESP)	Caja Rural–Orbea	s.t.
8	Robert Millar (GBR)	Fagor–MBK	s.t.
9	Henry Cárdenas (COL)	Café de Colombia	s.t.
10	Julián Gorospe (ESP)	Reynolds	s.t.

== Stage 3 ==
27 April 1988 — Las Palmas to Las Palmas, 34 km (21 mi) (TTT)

Stage 3 result

Rank	Team	Time
1	BH	44' 24"
2	Teka	+ 15"
3	Reynolds	+ 29"
4	Caja Rural–Orbea	+ 45"
5	Fagor–MBK	+ 54"
6	Kas–Canal 10	+ 1' 11"
7	Kelme	+ 1' 16"
8	Carrera Jeans–Vagabond	+ 1' 36"
9	Postobón–Manzana–Ryalcao	+ 1' 47"
10	Zahor Chocolates	+ 2' 01"

General classification after Stage 3

Rank	Rider	Team	Time
1	Laudelino Cubino (ESP)	BH	6h 29' 50"
2	Álvaro Pino (ESP)	BH	+ 1' 27"
3	Jokin Mújika (ESP)	Caja Rural–Orbea	+ 1' 39"
4	Reimund Dietzen (FRG)	Teka	+ 1' 42"
5	Julián Gorospe (ESP)	Reynolds	+ 1' 56"
6	Enrique Aja (ESP)	Teka	+ 2' 03"
7	Iñaki Gastón (ESP)	Kelme	+ 2' 08"
8	Marino Lejarreta (ESP)	Caja Rural–Orbea	+ 2' 12"
9	Anselmo Fuerte (ESP)	BH	s.t.
10	Jørgen Pedersen (DEN)	BH	s.t.

== Stage 4 ==
28 April 1988 — Alcalá del Río to Badajoz, 210 km (130 mi)

Stage 4 result

Rank	Rider	Team	Time
1	Mathieu Hermans (NED)	Caja Rural–Orbea	5h 27' 10"
2	Manuel Jorge Domínguez (ESP)	BH	s.t.
3	Malcolm Elliott (GBR)	Fagor–MBK	s.t.
4	Alfonso Gutiérrez (ESP)	Teka	s.t.
5	Francisco Javier Quevedo (ESP)	CLAS	s.t.
6	Flavio Chesini (ITA)	Alba-Cucine	s.t.
7	Sean Kelly (IRL)	Kas–Canal 10	s.t.
8	Roger Ilegems (BEL)	Sigma–Dormilon	s.t.
9	José Enrique Carrera (ESP)	Reynolds	s.t.
10	Ettore Pastorelli (ITA)	Carrera Jeans–Vagabond	s.t.

General classification after Stage 4

Rank	Rider	Team	Time
1	Laudelino Cubino (ESP)	BH	11h 57' 07"
2	Álvaro Pino (ESP)	BH	+ 1' 38"
3	Reimund Dietzen (FRG)	Teka	+ 1' 42"
4	Jokin Mújika (ESP)	Caja Rural–Orbea	+ 1' 50"
5	Julián Gorospe (ESP)	Reynolds	+ 2' 12"
6	Enrique Aja (ESP)	Teka	+ 2' 14"
7	Iñaki Gastón (ESP)	Kelme	+ 2' 19"
8	Anselmo Fuerte (ESP)	BH	+ 2' 23"
9	Sean Kelly (IRL)	Kas–Canal 10	+ 2' 27"
10	Jesús Blanco Villar (ESP)	Teka	s.t.

== Stage 5 ==
29 April 1988 — Badajoz to Béjar, 234 km (145 mi)

Stage 5 result

Rank	Rider	Team	Time
1	Francisco Navarro Fuster (ESP)	Seur–Campagnolo–Bic	6h 13' 13"
2	Primož Čerin (YUG)	Carrera Jeans–Vagabond	+ 4' 23"
3	Ángel Ocaña (ESP)	Zahor Chocolates	s.t.
4	Martín Ramírez (COL)	Café de Colombia	s.t.
5	Sean Kelly (IRL)	Kas–Canal 10	+ 4' 47"
6	Acácio da Silva (POR)	Kas–Canal 10	s.t.
7	Claudio Chiappucci (ITA)	Carrera Jeans–Vagabond	s.t.
8	Manuel Jorge Domínguez (ESP)	BH	s.t.
9	Laudelino Cubino (ESP)	BH	s.t.
10	Jokin Mújika (ESP)	Caja Rural–Orbea	s.t.

General classification after Stage 5

Rank	Rider	Team	Time
1	Laudelino Cubino (ESP)	BH	18h 15' 07"
2	Reimund Dietzen (FRG)	Teka	+ 1' 38"
3	Álvaro Pino (ESP)	BH	s.t.
4	Jokin Mújika (ESP)	Caja Rural–Orbea	+ 1' 50"
5	Julián Gorospe (ESP)	Reynolds	+ 2' 12"
6	Enrique Aja (ESP)	Teka	+ 2' 14"
7	Sean Kelly (IRL)	Kas–Canal 10	+ 2' 15"
8	Iñaki Gastón (ESP)	Kelme	+ 2' 19"
9	Jørgen Pedersen (DEN)	BH	+ 2' 22"
10	Anselmo Fuerte (ESP)	BH	+ 2' 23"

== Stage 6 ==
30 April 1988 — Béjar to Valladolid, 202 km (126 mi)

Stage 6 result

Rank	Rider	Team	Time
1	Mathieu Hermans (NED)	Caja Rural–Orbea	4h 06' 41"
2	Malcolm Elliott (GBR)	Fagor–MBK	s.t.
3	Sean Kelly (IRL)	Kas–Canal 10	s.t.
4	Anselmo Fuerte (ESP)	BH	s.t.
5	Américo José Neves Da Silva (ESP)	CLAS	s.t.
6	Marino Alonso (ESP)	Teka	s.t.
7	Fabio Bordonali (ITA)	Carrera Jeans–Vagabond	s.t.
8	Miguel Ángel Iglesias (ESP)	Helios CR	s.t.
9	Manuel Carrera Punzón (ESP)	Zahor Chocolates	s.t.
10	Manuel Jorge Domínguez (ESP)	BH	s.t.

General classification after Stage 6

Rank	Rider	Team	Time
1	Laudelino Cubino (ESP)	BH	22h 21' 56"
2	Reimund Dietzen (FRG)	Teka	+ 1' 30"
3	Álvaro Pino (ESP)	BH	s.t.
4	Jokin Mújika (ESP)	Caja Rural–Orbea	+ 1' 42"
5	Sean Kelly (IRL)	Kas–Canal 10	+ 1' 51"
6	Jørgen Pedersen (DEN)	BH	+ 1' 56"
7	Julián Gorospe (ESP)	Reynolds	+ 2' 04"
8	Enrique Aja (ESP)	Teka	+ 2' 06"
9	Anselmo Fuerte (ESP)	BH	+ 2' 11"
10	Iñaki Gastón (ESP)	Kelme	s.t.

== Stage 7 ==
1 May 1988 — Valladolid to León, 160 km (99 mi)

Stage 7 result

Rank	Rider	Team	Time
1	Mathieu Hermans (NED)	Caja Rural–Orbea	3h 35' 49"
2	Alfonso Gutiérrez (ESP)	Teka	s.t.
3	Sean Kelly (IRL)	Kas–Canal 10	s.t.
4	Manuel Jorge Domínguez (ESP)	BH	s.t.
5	Malcolm Elliott (GBR)	Fagor–MBK	s.t.
6	Flavio Chesini (ITA)	Alba-Cucine	s.t.
7	Américo José Neves Da Silva (ESP)	CLAS	s.t.
8	Casimiro Moreda (ESP)	CLAS	s.t.
9	José Luis Laguía (ESP)	Reynolds	s.t.
10	Fabio Bordonali (ITA)	Carrera Jeans–Vagabond	s.t.

General classification after Stage 7

Rank	Rider	Team	Time
1	Laudelino Cubino (ESP)	BH	25h 57' 45"
2	Reimund Dietzen (FRG)	Teka	+ 1' 22"
3	Sean Kelly (IRL)	Kas–Canal 10	+ 1' 25"
4	Jokin Mújika (ESP)	Caja Rural–Orbea	+ 1' 42"
5	Anselmo Fuerte (ESP)	BH	+ 2' 11"
6	Marino Lejarreta (ESP)	Caja Rural–Orbea	+ 2' 14"
7	Jesús Blanco Villar (ESP)	Teka	+ 2' 19"
8	Robert Millar (GBR)	Fagor–MBK	+ 2' 24"
9	Roberto Córdoba Asensi (ESP)	BH	+ 2' 39"
10	Ángel Arroyo (ESP)	Reynolds	+ 2' 40"

== Stage 8 ==
2 May 1988 — León to Brañillín, 176.7 km (109.8 mi)

Stage 8 result

Rank	Rider	Team	Time
1	Álvaro Pino (ESP)	BH	5h 18' 29"
2	Laudelino Cubino (ESP)	BH	+ 1' 36"
3	Ángel Arroyo (ESP)	Reynolds	+ 1' 37"
4	Anselmo Fuerte (ESP)	BH	s.t.
5	Fabio Parra (COL)	Kelme	s.t.
6	Robert Millar (GBR)	Fagor–MBK	+ 2' 12"
7	Federico Echave (ESP)	BH	+ 2' 29"
8	Pedro Saúl Morales (COL)	Postobón–Manzana–Ryalcao	s.t.
9	Roberto Córdoba Asensi (ESP)	BH	s.t.
10	Sean Kelly (IRL)	Kas–Canal 10	s.t.

General classification after Stage 8

Rank	Rider	Team	Time
1	Laudelino Cubino (ESP)	BH	31h 17' 50"
2	Anselmo Fuerte (ESP)	BH	+ 2' 12"
3	Reimund Dietzen (FRG)	Teka	+ 2' 15"
4	Sean Kelly (IRL)	Kas–Canal 10	+ 2' 18"
5	Ángel Arroyo (ESP)	Reynolds	+ 2' 43"
6	Jokin Mújika (ESP)	Caja Rural–Orbea	+ 2' 49"
7	Fabio Parra (COL)	Kelme	+ 2' 52"
8	Robert Millar (GBR)	Fagor–MBK	+ 3' 00"
9	Jesús Blanco Villar (ESP)	Teka	+ 3' 12"
10	Roberto Córdoba Asensi (ESP)	BH	+ 3' 32"

== Stage 9 ==
3 May 1988 — Oviedo to Monte Naranco, 6.8 km (4.2 mi) (ITT)

Stage 9 result

Rank	Rider	Team	Time
1	Álvaro Pino (ESP)	BH	14' 41"
2	Sean Kelly (IRL)	Kas–Canal 10	+ 23"
3	Luis Herrera (COL)	Café de Colombia	+ 30"
4	Laudelino Cubino (ESP)	BH	+ 30"
5	Julián Gorospe (ESP)	Reynolds	+ 32"
6	Anselmo Fuerte (ESP)	BH	+ 35"
7	Reimund Dietzen (FRG)	Teka	+ 39"
8	Fabio Parra (COL)	Kelme	+ 48"
9	Éric Caritoux (FRA)	Kas–Canal 10	+ 49"
10	Robert Millar (GBR)	Fagor–MBK	+ 50"

General classification after Stage 9

Rank	Rider	Team	Time
1	Laudelino Cubino (ESP)	BH	31h 33' 02"
2	Sean Kelly (IRL)	Kas–Canal 10	+ 2' 10"
3	Anselmo Fuerte (ESP)	BH	+ 2' 16"
4	Reimund Dietzen (FRG)	Teka	+ 2' 34"
5	Fabio Parra (COL)	Kelme	+ 3' 10"
6	Ángel Arroyo (ESP)	Reynolds	+ 3' 15"
7	Robert Millar (GBR)	Fagor–MBK	+ 3' 19"
8	Jesús Blanco Villar (ESP)	Teka	+ 3' 53"
9	Jokin Mújika (ESP)	Caja Rural–Orbea	s.t.
10	Roberto Córdoba Asensi (ESP)	BH	+ 4' 52"

== Stage 10 ==
4 May 1988 — Oviedo to Santander, 197.3 km (122.6 mi)

Stage 10 result

Rank	Rider	Team	Time
1	Mathieu Hermans (NED)	Caja Rural–Orbea	4h 26' 53"
2	Manuel Jorge Domínguez (ESP)	BH	s.t.
3	Benny Van Brabant (BEL)	Zahor Chocolates	s.t.
4	Francisco Javier Quevedo (ESP)	CLAS	s.t.
5	Malcolm Elliott (GBR)	Fagor–MBK	s.t.
6	Sean Kelly (IRL)	Kas–Canal 10	s.t.
7	Flavio Chesini (ITA)	Alba-Cucine	s.t.
8	Fabio Bordonali (ITA)	Carrera Jeans–Vagabond	s.t.
9	Casimiro Moreda (ESP)	CLAS	s.t.
10	Willem Wijnant (BEL)	Sigma–Dormilon	s.t.

General classification after Stage 10

Rank	Rider	Team	Time
1	Laudelino Cubino (ESP)	BH	35h 59' 55"
2	Sean Kelly (IRL)	Kas–Canal 10	+ 2' 04"
3	Anselmo Fuerte (ESP)	BH	+ 2' 16"
4	Reimund Dietzen (FRG)	Teka	+ 2' 24"
5	Fabio Parra (COL)	Kelme	+ 3' 10"
6	Ángel Arroyo (ESP)	Reynolds	+ 3' 15"
7	Robert Millar (GBR)	Fagor–MBK	+ 3' 19"
8	Jesús Blanco Villar (ESP)	Teka	+ 3' 53"
9	Jokin Mújika (ESP)	Caja Rural–Orbea	s.t.
10	Roberto Córdoba Asensi (ESP)	BH	+ 4' 52"

== Stage 11 ==
5 May 1988 — Santander to Valdezcaray, 217.2 km (135.0 mi)

Stage 11 result

Rank	Rider	Team	Time
1	Sean Kelly (IRL)	Kas–Canal 10	6h 12' 46"
2	Benny Van Brabant (BEL)	Zahor Chocolates	s.t.
3	Reimund Dietzen (FRG)	Teka	s.t.
4	Laudelino Cubino (ESP)	BH	s.t.
5	Luis Herrera (COL)	Café de Colombia	s.t.
6	Álvaro Pino (ESP)	BH	s.t.
7	Mariano Sánchez Martinez (ESP)	Teka	s.t.
8	Eddy Schepers (BEL)	Fagor–MBK	s.t.
9	Carlos Jaramillo (COL)	Postobón–Manzana–Ryalcao	s.t.
10	Anselmo Fuerte (ESP)	BH	s.t.

General classification after Stage 11

Rank	Rider	Team	Time
1	Laudelino Cubino (ESP)	BH	42h 12' 41"
2	Sean Kelly (IRL)	Kas–Canal 10	+ 2' 04"
3	Anselmo Fuerte (ESP)	BH	+ 2' 16"
4	Reimund Dietzen (FRG)	Teka	+ 2' 24"
5	Fabio Parra (COL)	Kelme	+ 3' 10"
6	Ángel Arroyo (ESP)	Reynolds	+ 3' 15"
7	Robert Millar (GBR)	Fagor–MBK	+ 3' 19"
8	Jesús Blanco Villar (ESP)	Teka	+ 3' 53"
9	Roberto Córdoba Asensi (ESP)	BH	+ 4' 52"
10	Álvaro Pino (ESP)	BH	+ 6' 26"
