= 1988 Vuelta a España, Stage 12 to Stage 21 =

Cycling race stages

The 1988 Vuelta a España was the 43rd edition of the Vuelta a España, one of cycling's Grand Tours. The Vuelta began in Santa Cruz de Tenerife, with an individual time trial on 25 April, and Stage 12 occurred on 6 May with a stage from Logroño. The race finished in Madrid on 15 May.

== Stage 12 ==
6 May 1988 — Logroño to Jaca, 197.5 km (122.7 mi)

Stage 12 result

Rank	Rider	Team	Time
1	Sean Yates (GBR)	Fagor–MBK	5h 36' 35"
2	Deno Davie (GBR)	Carrera Jeans–Vagabond	+ 2"
3	Mathieu Hermans (NED)	Caja Rural–Orbea	+ 3"
4	Francisco Javier Quevedo (ESP)	CLAS	s.t.
5	Benny Van Brabant (BEL)	Zahor Chocolates	s.t.
6	Alexandre Manuel Costa Rua (POR)	Sicasal–Torrense	s.t.
7	Sean Kelly (IRL)	Kas–Canal 10	s.t.
8	Fabio Bordonali (ITA)	Carrera Jeans–Vagabond	s.t.
9	Alfonso Gutiérrez (ESP)	Teka	s.t.
10	Eddy Vanhaerens (BEL)	Sigma–Dormilon	s.t.

General classification after Stage 12

Rank	Rider	Team	Time
1	Laudelino Cubino (ESP)	BH	47h 49' 19"
2	Sean Kelly (IRL)	Kas–Canal 10	+ 2' 04"
3	Anselmo Fuerte (ESP)	BH	+ 2' 16"
4	Reimund Dietzen (FRG)	Teka	+ 2' 24"
5	Fabio Parra (COL)	Kelme	+ 3' 10"
6	Ángel Arroyo (ESP)	Reynolds	+ 3' 15"
7	Robert Millar (GBR)	Fagor–MBK	+ 3' 19"
8	Jesús Blanco Villar (ESP)	Teka	+ 3' 53"
9	Roberto Córdoba Asensi (ESP)	BH	+ 4' 52"
10	Álvaro Pino (ESP)	BH	+ 6' 26"

== Stage 13 ==
7 May 1988 — Jaca to Cerler, 178.2 km (110.7 mi)

Stage 13 result

Rank	Rider	Team	Time
1	Fabio Parra (COL)	Kelme	4h 59' 01"
2	Anselmo Fuerte (ESP)	BH	s.t.
3	Robert Millar (GBR)	Fagor–MBK	+ 42"
4	Sean Kelly (IRL)	Kas–Canal 10	s.t.
5	Reimund Dietzen (FRG)	Teka	s.t.
6	José Alirio Chizabas Torres (COL)	Pony Malta	s.t.
7	Álvaro Pino (ESP)	BH	+ 1' 37"
8	Luis Herrera (COL)	Café de Colombia	+ 1' 48"
9	Mariano Sánchez Martinez (ESP)	Teka	+ 2' 03"
10	Acácio da Silva (POR)	Kas–Canal 10	s.t.

General classification after Stage 13

Rank	Rider	Team	Time
1	Laudelino Cubino (ESP)	BH	52h 50' 33"
2	Anselmo Fuerte (ESP)	BH	+ 3"
3	Sean Kelly (IRL)	Kas–Canal 10	+ 33"
4	Reimund Dietzen (FRG)	Teka	+ 53"
5	Fabio Parra (COL)	Kelme	+ 57"
6	Robert Millar (GBR)	Fagor–MBK	+ 1' 48"
7	Jesús Blanco Villar (ESP)	Teka	+ 4' 37"
8	Roberto Córdoba Asensi (ESP)	BH	+ 5' 16"
9	Álvaro Pino (ESP)	BH	+ 5' 50"
10	Eddy Schepers (BEL)	Fagor–MBK	+ 7' 24"

== Stage 14 ==
8 May 1988 — Benasque to Andorra, 190.3 km (118.2 mi)

Stage 14 result

Rank	Rider	Team	Time
1	Iñaki Gastón (ESP)	Kelme	5h 14' 28"
2	Robert Millar (GBR)	Fagor–MBK	s.t.
3	Paul Haghedooren (BEL)	Fagor–MBK	s.t.
4	Benny Van Brabant (BEL)	Zahor Chocolates	s.t.
5	Álvaro Pino (ESP)	BH	s.t.
6	Casimiro Moreda (ESP)	CLAS	s.t.
7	William Palacio (COL)	Reynolds	s.t.
8	Sean Kelly (IRL)	Kas–Canal 10	s.t.
9	Anselmo Fuerte (ESP)	BH	s.t.
10	Jesús Blanco Villar (ESP)	Teka	s.t.

General classification after Stage 14

Rank	Rider	Team	Time
1	Laudelino Cubino (ESP)	BH	58h 05' 01"
2	Anselmo Fuerte (ESP)	BH	+ 3"
3	Sean Kelly (IRL)	Kas–Canal 10	+ 33"
4	Reimund Dietzen (FRG)	Teka	+ 53"
5	Fabio Parra (COL)	Kelme	+ 57"
6	Robert Millar (GBR)	Fagor–MBK	+ 1' 48"
7	Jesús Blanco Villar (ESP)	Teka	+ 4' 37"
8	Roberto Córdoba Asensi (ESP)	BH	+ 5' 16"
9	Álvaro Pino (ESP)	BH	+ 5' 50"
10	Eddy Schepers (BEL)	Fagor–MBK	+ 7' 24"

== Stage 15 ==
9 May 1988 — La Seu d'Urgell to Sant Quirze del Vallès, 166 km (103 mi)

Stage 15 result

Rank	Rider	Team	Time
1	Johnny Weltz (DEN)	Fagor–MBK	4h 04' 13"
2	Fabio Bordonali (ITA)	Carrera Jeans–Vagabond	s.t.
3	Luis Herrera (COL)	Café de Colombia	s.t.
4	Luc Suykerbuyk (NED)	Zahor Chocolates	s.t.
5	Enrique Aja (ESP)	Teka	s.t.
6	René Beuker (NED)	Caja Rural–Orbea	s.t.
7	Marco Bergamo (ITA)	Carrera Jeans–Vagabond	s.t.
8	Francisco Javier Quevedo (ESP)	CLAS	s.t.
9	Roger Ilegems (BEL)	Sigma–Dormilon	+ 17"
10	Juan Martínez Oliver (ESP)	Kelme	s.t.

General classification after Stage 15

Rank	Rider	Team	Time
1	Laudelino Cubino (ESP)	BH	62h 14' 23"
2	Anselmo Fuerte (ESP)	BH	+ 3"
3	Sean Kelly (IRL)	Kas–Canal 10	+ 33"
4	Reimund Dietzen (FRG)	Teka	+ 53"
5	Fabio Parra (COL)	Kelme	+ 57"
6	Robert Millar (GBR)	Fagor–MBK	+ 1' 48"
7	Jesús Blanco Villar (ESP)	Teka	+ 4' 37"
8	Roberto Córdoba Asensi (ESP)	BH	+ 5' 16"
9	Álvaro Pino (ESP)	BH	+ 5' 50"
10	Eddy Schepers (BEL)	Fagor–MBK	+ 7' 24"

== Stage 16 ==
10 May 1988 — Valencia to Albacete, 192.1 km (119.4 mi)

Stage 16 result

Rank	Rider	Team	Time
1	Mathieu Hermans (NED)	Caja Rural–Orbea	4h 28' 55"
2	Claudio Chiappucci (ITA)	Carrera Jeans–Vagabond	s.t.
3	Benny Van Brabant (BEL)	Zahor Chocolates	s.t.
4	Jean-Claude Bagot (FRA)	Fagor–MBK	s.t.
5	Mauro-Antonio Santaromita (ITA)	Alba Cucine	s.t.
6	Erwin Nijboer (NED)	Caja Rural–Orbea	+ 2"
7	Malcolm Elliott (GBR)	Fagor–MBK	+ 1' 34"
8	José Enrique Carrera (ESP)	Reynolds	s.t.
9	Alexandre Manuel Costa Rua (POR)	Sicasal–Torrense	s.t.
10	Sean Kelly (IRL)	Kas–Canal 10	s.t.

General classification after Stage 16

Rank	Rider	Team	Time
1	Anselmo Fuerte (ESP)	BH	66h 44' 53"
2	Sean Kelly (IRL)	Kas–Canal 10	+ 28"
3	Reimund Dietzen (FRG)	Teka	+ 52"
4	Laudelino Cubino (ESP)	BH	+ 54"
5	Fabio Parra (COL)	Kelme	+ 56"
6	Robert Millar (GBR)	Fagor–MBK	+ 1' 47"
7	Roberto Córdoba Asensi (ESP)	BH	+ 5' 15"
8	Jesús Blanco Villar (ESP)	Teka	+ 5' 31"
9	Eddy Schepers (BEL)	Fagor–MBK	+ 7' 23"
10	Álvaro Pino (ESP)	BH	+ 8' 21"

== Stage 17 ==
11 May 1988 — Albacete to Toledo, 244.4 km (151.9 mi)

Stage 17 result

Rank	Rider	Team	Time
1	Malcolm Elliott (GBR)	Fagor–MBK	6h 01' 29"
2	Sean Kelly (IRL)	Kas–Canal 10	s.t.
3	Benny Van Brabant (BEL)	Zahor Chocolates	s.t.
4	Casimiro Moreda (ESP)	CLAS	s.t.
5	Jon Unzaga (ESP)	Kas–Canal 10	s.t.
6	Martin Earley (IRL)	Kas–Canal 10	s.t.
7	Claudio Chiappucci (ITA)	Carrera Jeans–Vagabond	s.t.
8	Robert Millar (GBR)	Fagor–MBK	s.t.
9	Federico Echave (ESP)	BH	s.t.
10	Anselmo Fuerte (ESP)	BH	s.t.

General classification after Stage 17

Rank	Rider	Team	Time
1	Anselmo Fuerte (ESP)	BH	72h 46' 22"
2	Sean Kelly (IRL)	Kas–Canal 10	+ 21"
3	Reimund Dietzen (FRG)	Teka	+ 52"
4	Laudelino Cubino (ESP)	BH	+ 54"
5	Fabio Parra (COL)	Kelme	+ 56"
6	Robert Millar (GBR)	Fagor–MBK	+ 1' 47"
7	Roberto Córdoba Asensi (ESP)	BH	+ 5' 15"
8	Jesús Blanco Villar (ESP)	Teka	+ 5' 31"
9	Eddy Schepers (BEL)	Fagor–MBK	+ 7' 23"
10	Álvaro Pino (ESP)	BH	+ 8' 21"

== Stage 18 ==
12 May 1988 — Toledo to Ávila, 212.5 km (132.0 mi)

Stage 18 result

Rank	Rider	Team	Time
1	Juan Martínez Oliver (ESP)	Kelme	6h 37' 34"
2	Jesús Rodríguez Rodríguez (ESP)	Helios CR	+ 19"
3	Jørgen Pedersen (DEN)	BH	+ 2' 27"
4	Mariano Sánchez Martinez (ESP)	Teka	s.t.
5	Ángel Ocaña (ESP)	Zahor Chocolates	s.t.
6	Santiago Portillo Rosado (ESP)	Zahor Chocolates	s.t.
7	Benny Van Brabant (BEL)	Zahor Chocolates	+ 3' 03"
8	Sean Kelly (IRL)	Kas–Canal 10	s.t.
9	Iñaki Gastón (ESP)	Kelme	s.t.
10	Claudio Chiappucci (ITA)	Carrera Jeans–Vagabond	s.t.

General classification after Stage 18

Rank	Rider	Team	Time
1	Anselmo Fuerte (ESP)	BH	79h 26' 59"
2	Sean Kelly (IRL)	Kas–Canal 10	+ 21"
3	Reimund Dietzen (FRG)	Teka	+ 52"
4	Laudelino Cubino (ESP)	BH	+ 54"
5	Fabio Parra (COL)	Kelme	+ 56"
6	Robert Millar (GBR)	Fagor–MBK	+ 1' 47"
7	Roberto Córdoba Asensi (ESP)	BH	+ 5' 15"
8	Jesús Blanco Villar (ESP)	Teka	+ 5' 31"
9	Eddy Schepers (BEL)	Fagor–MBK	+ 7' 23"
10	Álvaro Pino (ESP)	BH	+ 8' 21"

== Stage 19 ==
13 May 1988 — Ávila to Segovia, 150 km (93 mi)

Stage 19 result

Rank	Rider	Team	Time
1	Ángel Ocaña (ESP)	Zahor Chocolates	3h 56' 56"
2	Reimund Dietzen (FRG)	Teka	s.t.
3	Benny Van Brabant (BEL)	Zahor Chocolates	s.t.
4	Martin Earley (IRL)	Kas–Canal 10	s.t.
5	Sean Kelly (IRL)	Kas–Canal 10	s.t.
6	Anselmo Fuerte (ESP)	BH	s.t.
7	Juan Tomás Martínez Gutiérrez (ESP)	Zahor Chocolates	s.t.
8	Roland Le Clerc (FRA)	Caja Rural–Orbea	s.t.
9	Eddy Schepers (BEL)	Fagor–MBK	s.t.
10	Marco Franco Votolo (ITA)	Carrera Jeans–Vagabond	s.t.

General classification after Stage 19

Rank	Rider	Team	Time
1	Anselmo Fuerte (ESP)	BH	83h 23' 35"
2	Sean Kelly (IRL)	Kas–Canal 10	+ 21"
3	Reimund Dietzen (FRG)	Teka	+ 52"
4	Laudelino Cubino (ESP)	BH	+ 54"
5	Fabio Parra (COL)	Kelme	+ 56"
6	Robert Millar (GBR)	Fagor–MBK	+ 1' 47"
7	Roberto Córdoba Asensi (ESP)	BH	+ 6' 53"
8	Jesús Blanco Villar (ESP)	Teka	+ 7' 09"
9	Eddy Schepers (BEL)	Fagor–MBK	+ 7' 23"
10	Álvaro Pino (ESP)	BH	+ 8' 21"

== Stage 20 ==
14 May 1988 — Las Rozas to Villalba, 30 km (19 mi) (ITT)

Stage 20 result

Rank	Rider	Team	Time
1	Sean Kelly (IRL)	Kas–Canal 10	42' 38"
2	Reimund Dietzen (FRG)	Teka	+ 1' 07"
3	Jørgen Pedersen (DEN)	BH	+ 1' 14"
4	Álvaro Pino (ESP)	BH	+ 1' 25"
5	Jesús Blanco Villar (ESP)	Teka	+ 1' 30"
6	José Recio (ESP)	Kelme	+ 1' 35"
7	Erwin Nijboer (NED)	Caja Rural–Orbea	+ 1' 42"
8	Laudelino Cubino (ESP)	BH	+ 1' 44"
9	Roger Ilegems (BEL)	Sigma–Dormilon	+ 1' 45"
10	Fabio Parra (COL)	Kelme	+ 1' 50"

General classification after Stage 20

Rank	Rider	Team	Time
1	Sean Kelly (IRL)	Kas–Canal 10	84h 06' 54"
2	Anselmo Fuerte (ESP)	BH	+ 1' 36"
3	Reimund Dietzen (FRG)	Teka	+ 1' 38"
4	Laudelino Cubino (ESP)	BH	+ 2' 17"
5	Fabio Parra (COL)	Kelme	+ 2' 25"
6	Robert Millar (GBR)	Fagor–MBK	+ 3' 22"
7	Jesús Blanco Villar (ESP)	Teka	+ 8' 19"
8	Álvaro Pino (ESP)	BH	+ 9' 25"
9	Eddy Schepers (BEL)	Fagor–MBK	+ 9' 45"
10	Roberto Córdoba Asensi (ESP)	BH	+ 10' 28"

== Stage 21 ==
15 May 1988 — Villalba to Madrid, 202 km (126 mi)

Stage 21 result

Rank	Rider	Team	Time
1	Mathieu Hermans (NED)	Caja Rural–Orbea	5h 12' 29"
2	Antonio Joaquim De Castro Oliveira Pinto (POR)	Sicasal–Torrense	s.t.
3	Casimiro Moreda (ESP)	CLAS	s.t.
4	Benny Van Brabant (BEL)	Zahor Chocolates	s.t.
5	Sean Kelly (IRL)	Kas–Canal 10	s.t.
6	Roger Ilegems (BEL)	Sigma–Dormilon	s.t.
7	Malcolm Elliott (GBR)	Fagor–MBK	s.t.
8	Alfonso Gutiérrez (ESP)	Teka	s.t.
9	Miguel Ángel Iglesias (ESP)	Helios CR	s.t.
10	Fabio Bordonali (ITA)	Carrera Jeans–Vagabond	s.t.

General classification after Stage 21

Rank	Rider	Team	Time
1	Sean Kelly (IRL)	Kas–Canal 10	89h 19' 23"
2	Reimund Dietzen (FRG)	Teka	+ 1' 27"
3	Anselmo Fuerte (ESP)	BH	+ 1' 29"
4	Laudelino Cubino (ESP)	BH	+ 2' 17"
5	Fabio Parra (COL)	Kelme	+ 2' 25"
6	Robert Millar (GBR)	Fagor–MBK	+ 3' 22"
7	Jesús Blanco Villar (ESP)	Teka	+ 8' 19"
8	Álvaro Pino (ESP)	BH	+ 9' 25"
9	Eddy Schepers (BEL)	Fagor–MBK	+ 9' 45"
10	Roberto Córdoba Asensi (ESP)	BH	+ 10' 28"
