= 1988 Vuelta a España =

Race details
- Dates: 25 April – 15 May
- Stages: 20 + Prologue
- Distance: 3,425 km (2,128 mi)
- Winning time: 89h 19' 23"

Results
Jersey awarded to the overall winner	Winner	Sean Kelly (IRL)	(Kas–Canal 10)
	Second	Reimund Dietzen (GER)	(Teka)
	Third	Anselmo Fuerte (ESP)	(BH)
Jersey awarded to the points classification winner	Points	Sean Kelly (IRL)	(Kas–Canal 10)
Jersey awarded to the mountains classification winner	Mountains	Álvaro Pino (ESP)	(BH)
Jersey awarded to the youth classification winner	Youth	Carlos Muñiz (ESP)	(CLAS)
Jersey awarded to the combination classification winner	Combination	Sean Kelly (IRL)	(Kas–Canal 10)
Jersey awarded to the sprints classification winner	Sprints	Miguel Ángel Iglesias (ESP)	(Helios–CR)
	Team	BH	

The 1988 Vuelta a España was the 43rd Edition Vuelta a España, taking place from 25 April to 15 May 1988. It was a bicycle race which consisted of 20 stages over 3,425 km (2,128 mi), ridden at an average speed of 38.506 km/h (23.927 mph). Sean Kelly started the race as the principal favourite after performance in the 1987 Vuelta a España in which he was leading the General classification with several days remaining in the race when he was forced to withdraw due to injury. Luis "Lucho" Herrera returned to defend his title while 1985 Vuelta winner Pedro Delgado had decided to ride the 1988 Giro d'Italia in preparation for the 1988 Tour de France. The BH team directed by Javier Mínguez, presented solid opposition with the strong climbers Álvaro Pino (winner of the 1986 Vuelta a España) and Anselmo Fuerte. In the end, Kelly won the race and became the first Irish winner of the Vuelta a España, completing a hat-trick of consecutive Irish Grand Tour victories: Stephen Roche having won the 1987 Giro d'Italia and the 1987 Tour de France.

== Route ==
The first stage introduced an innovative format of five heats, each with two riders per team, with the team leaders appearing in the final heat.

List of stages
Stage	Date	Course	Distance	Type	Winner
1	25 April	Santa Cruz de Tenerife	17.4 km (10.8 mi)	Individual time trial	Ettore Pastorelli (ITA)
2	26 April	San Cristóbal de La Laguna to Santa Cruz de Tenerife	210 km (130 mi)		Iñaki Gastón (ESP)
3	27 April	Las Palmas to Las Palmas	34 km (21 mi)	Team time trial	BH
4	28 April	Alcalá del Río to Badajoz	210 km (130 mi)		Mathieu Hermans (NED)
5	29 April	Badajoz to Béjar	234 km (145 mi)		Francisco Navarro (ESP)
6	30 April	Béjar to Valladolid	202 km (126 mi)		Mathieu Hermans (NED)
7	1 May	Valladolid to León	160 km (99 mi)		Mathieu Hermans (NED)
8	2 May	León to Brañillín	176.7 km (109.8 mi)		Álvaro Pino (ESP)
9	3 May	Oviedo to Monte Naranco	6.8 km (4.2 mi)	Individual time trial	Álvaro Pino (ESP)
10	4 May	Oviedo to Santander	197.3 km (122.6 mi)		Mathieu Hermans (NED)
11	5 May	Santander to Valdezcaray	217.2 km (135.0 mi)		Sean Kelly (IRL)
12	6 May	Logroño to Jaca	197.5 km (122.7 mi)		Sean Yates (GBR)
13	7 May	Jaca to Cerler	178.2 km (110.7 mi)		Fabio Parra (COL)
14	8 May	Benasque to Andorra	190.3 km (118.2 mi)		Iñaki Gastón (ESP)
15	9 May	La Seu d'Urgell to Sant Quirze del Vallès	166 km (103 mi)		Johnny Weltz (DEN)
16	10 May	Valencia to Albacete	192 km (119 mi)		Mathieu Hermans (NED)
17	11 May	Albacete to Toledo	244.4 km (151.9 mi)		Malcolm Elliott (GBR)
18	12 May	Toledo to Ávila	212.5 km (132.0 mi)		Juan Martínez Oliver (ESP)
19	13 May	Ávila to Segovia	150 km (93 mi)		Ángel Ocaña (ESP)
20	14 May	Las Rozas to Villalba	30 km (19 mi)	Individual time trial	Sean Kelly (IRL)
21	15 May	Villalba to Madrid	202 km (126 mi)		Mathieu Hermans (NED)
	Total		3,425 km (2,128 mi)		

== Results ==
=== Final General classification ===
Rank	Rider	Team	Time
1	(Republic of Ireland) Sean Kelly	Kas-Mavic	89h 19' 23"
2	(Germany) Reimund Dietzen	Teka-Mavi-Alanc	+ 1' 27"
3	(Spain) Anselmo Fuerte	BH	+ 1' 29"
4	(Spain) Laudelino Cubino	BH	+ 2' 17"
5	(Colombia) Fabio Parra Pinto	Kelme	+ 2' 25"
6	(United Kingdom) Robert Millar	Fagor-MBK	+ 3' 22"
7	(Spain) Jesús Blanco Villar	Teka-Mavi-Alanc	+ 8' 19"
8	(Spain) Álvaro Pino	BH	+ 8' 25"
9	(Belgium) Eddy Schepers	Fagor-MBK	+ 9' 45"
10	(Spain) Roberto Córdoba Asensi	BH	+ 10' 28"
11	(France) Éric Caritoux	Kas-Mavic	
12	(Colombia) William Palacio Navarro	Reynolds-Pinarello	
13	(Spain) Federico Echave Musatadi	BH	
14	(Spain) Jokin Mújika Aramburu	Caja Rural–Orbea	
15	(Italy) Franco Votolo	Carrera Jeans–Vagabond	
16	(Colombia) Martín Ramírez	Café de Colombia	
17	(Spain) José Luis Laguía	Reynolds-Pinarello	
18	(Spain) Mariano Sanchez Martinez	Teka-Mavi-Alanc	
19	(Republic of Ireland) Martin Earley	Kas-Mavic	
20	(Colombia) Luis Herrera	Café de Colombia	
21	(Colombia) Carlos Jaramillo	Postobón	
22	(Netherlands) Luc Suykerbuyk	Zahor Chocolates	
23	(Spain) Pello Ruiz Cabestany	Kas-Mavic	
24	(Spain) Vicente Ridaura	Caja Rural–Orbea	
25	(Spain) Juan Tomas Martinez Gutierrez	Zahor Chocolates	

=== KOM Classification ===
	Cyclist	Team	Points
1	(Spain) Álvaro Pino	BH	100
2	(Spain) Anselmo Fuerte	BH	62
3	(Republic of Ireland) Sean Kelly	KAS	60

=== Points Classification ===
	Cyclist	Team	Points
1	(Republic of Ireland) Sean Kelly	KAS	248
2	(Netherlands) Mathieu Hermans	CAJ	166
3	(Belgium) Benny Van Brabant	ZAH	138

=== Team classification ===
	Team	Country	Time
1	BH	Spain	-

=== Best First Year Professional ===
	Cyclist	Team	Time
1	(Spain) Carlos Muñiz Menéndez	CLAS	
