= Robert Forest (cyclist) =

French cyclist

Personal information
- Full name: Robert Forest
- Born: 18 November 1961 (age 64) Toulouse, France

Cycling career
- Sport: Cycling
- Discipline: Road
- Role: Rider

Professional teams
- 1984–1986: Peugeot
- 1987–1989: Fagor
- 1990: Café de Colombia
- 1991: Z
- 1992–1993: Chazal

Major wins
- Grand Tours Giro d'Italia 1 Stage (1987)

Robert Forest (born 18 November 1961) is a former French professional cyclist. He is most known for winning one stage in the 1987 Giro d'Italia.
