= 1989 Vuelta a Andalucía =

Race details
- Dates: 7–12 February 1989
- Stages: 5 + Prologue
- Distance: 828.7 km (514.9 mi)
- Winning time: 22h 25' 57"

Results
	Winner	Fabio Bordonali (ITA)
	Second	Luc Roosen (BEL)
	Third	Peter Hilse (FRG)

The 1989 Vuelta a Andalucía was the 35th edition of the Vuelta a Andalucía cycle race and was held on 7 February to 12 February 1989. The race started in Málaga and finished in Granada. The race was won by Fabio Bordonali.

== General classification ==
Final general classification

Rank	Rider	Time
1	Fabio Bordonali (ITA)	22h 25' 57"
2	Luc Roosen (BEL)	+ 8"
3	Peter Hilse (FRG)	+ 49"
4	Juan Tomás Martínez (ESP)	+ 1' 01"
5	Pedro Muñoz (ESP)	+ 1' 07"
6	Luc Suykerbuyk (NED)	+ 1' 10"
7	Guy Nulens (BEL)	s.t.
8	Nico Verhoeven (NED)	+ 1' 16"
9	Benny Van Brabant (BEL)	+ 1' 17"
10	Moreno Argentin (ITA)	+ 1' 19"
