= 1987 Giro d'Italia =

- Map of the 1987 Giro d'Italia route, from San Remo to Saint-Vincent (stage courses in red; connections between host towns in green)

Race details
- Dates: 21 May – 13 June 1987
- Stages: 22 + Prologue, including one split stage
- Distance: 3,915 km (2,433 mi)
- Winning time: 105h 39' 42"

Results
Jersey awarded to the overall winner	Winner	Stephen Roche (IRL)	(Carrera Jeans–Vagabond)
	Second	Robert Millar (GBR)	(Panasonic–Isostar)
	Third	Erik Breukink (NED)	(Panasonic–Isostar)
Jersey awarded to the points classification winner	Points	Johan van der Velde (NED)	(Gis Gelati–Jollyscarpe)
Jersey awarded to the mountains classification winner	Mountains	Robert Millar (GBR)	(Panasonic–Isostar)
Jersey awarded to the young rider classification winner	Young rider	Roberto Conti (ITA)	(Selca–Conti)
	Combination	Stephen Roche (IRL)	(Carrera Jeans–Vagabond)
	Sprints	Milan Jurčo (CSK)	(Brianzoli)
	Team	Panasonic–Isostar	

The 1987 Giro d'Italia was the 70th edition of the bicycle race. It began on 21 May with a 4 km (2.5 mi) prologue in San Remo, and concluded on 13 June with a 32 km (19.9 mi) individual time trial in Saint-Vincent. A total of 180 riders from 20 teams entered the 22-stage, 3,915 km (2,433 mi)-long race, which was won by Irishman Stephen Roche of the Carrera Jeans–Vagabond team. Second and third places were taken by British rider Robert Millar and Dutchman Erik Breukink, respectively. It was the second time in the history of the Giro that the podium was occupied solely by non-Italian riders. Roche's victory in the 1987 Giro was his first step in completing the Triple Crown of Cycling – winning the Giro d'Italia, the Tour de France, and the World Championship road race in one calendar year – becoming the second rider ever to do so.

Roche's teammate and defending champion Roberto Visentini took the first race leader's maglia rosa (English: pink jersey) after winning the opening prologue, only to lose it to Breukink the following stage. Roche took the overall lead after his team, Carrera Jeans–Vagabond, won the stage three team time trial. Visentini regained the lead for a two-day period after the stage 13 individual time trial. The fifteenth stage of the 1987 Giro has been recognized as an iconic event in the history of the race because Roche rode ahead of teammate Visentini, despite orders from the team management, and took the race lead. Roche successfully defended the overall lead from attacks by Visentini and other general classification contenders until the event's finish in Saint-Vincent.

Stephen Roche became the first Irishman to win the Giro d'Italia. In addition to the general classification, Roche also won the combination classification. In the other race classifications, Johan van der Velde of Gis Gelati–Jollyscarpe won the points classification, Robert Millar of Panasonic–Isostar took the mountains classification green jersey, and Selca–Conti's Roberto Conti completed the Giro as the best neo-professional in the general classification, finishing fifteenth overall. Panasonic–Isostar finished as the winners of the team classification, which ranks each of the twenty teams contesting the race by lowest cumulative time.

== Teams ==
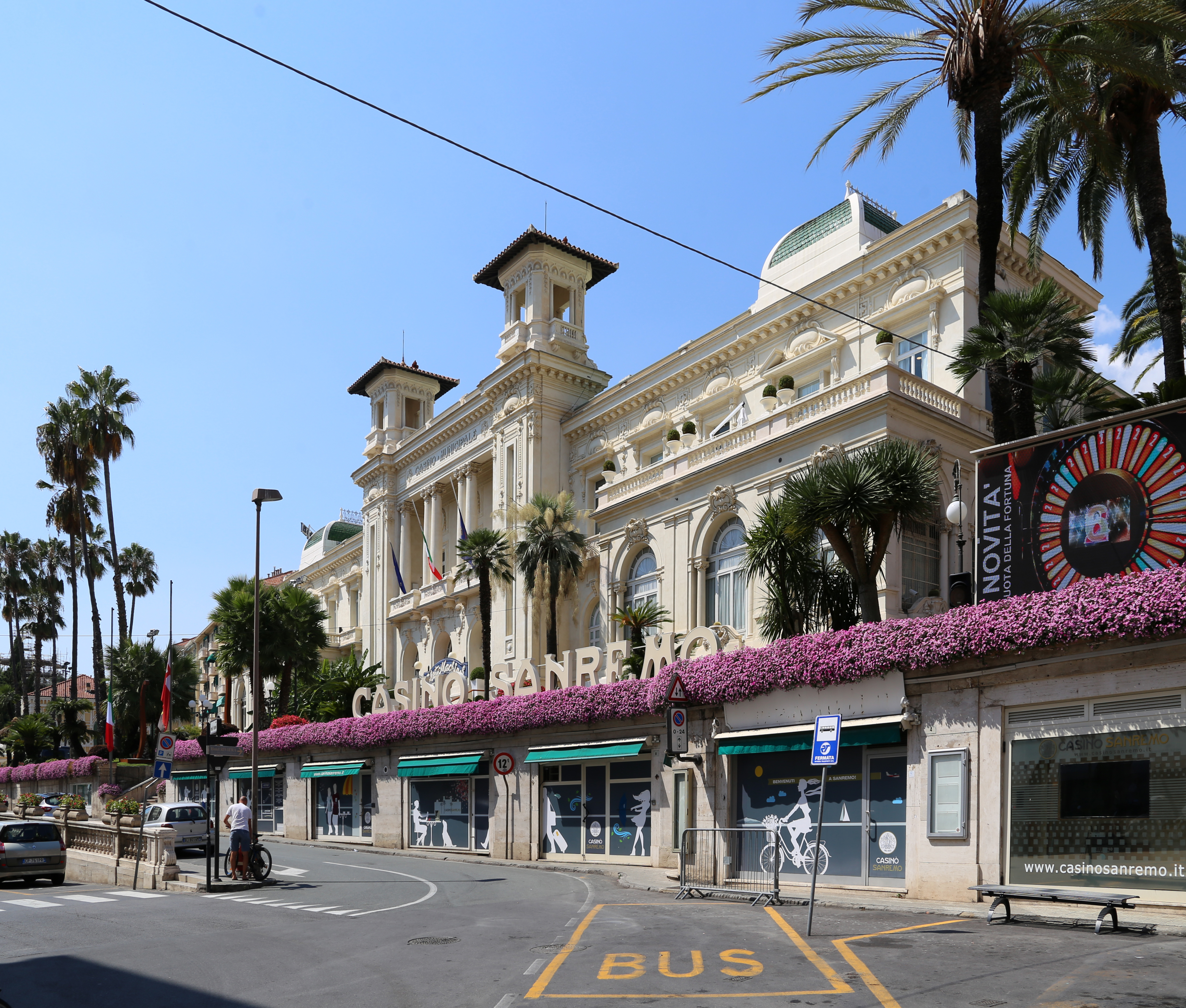
The team presentation ceremony took place on 21 May outside the Casino of San Remo.

A total of 20 teams were invited to participate in the 1987 Giro d'Italia. Each team sent a squad of nine riders, which meant that the race started with a peloton of 180 cyclists. The starting peloton featured riders from 17 different countries. Italy (91), the Netherlands (16), Spain (15), Belgium (13), Switzerland (10), and France (10) all had more than 10 or more riders.

Of those starting, 74 were riding the Giro d'Italia for the first time. The average age of riders was 26.52 years, ranging from 21–year–old Andreas Kappes from Toshiba–Look to 38–year–old Hennie Kuiper of Roland–Skala. The team with the youngest average rider age was Magniflex–Centroscarpa (23), while the oldest was Fagor–MBK (28). The presentation of the teams – where each team's roster and manager are introduced in front of the media and local dignitaries – took place on 20 May, outside the Casino of San Remo. From the riders that began this edition, 133 completed the race.

The teams entering the race were:

- Ariostea–Gres
- Atala–Ofmega
- Supermercati Brianzoli–Chateau d'Ax
- Caja Rural–Orbea
- Carrera Jeans–Vagabond
- Del Tongo
- Ecoflam–BFB Bruciatori–Mareco–Alfa Lum
- Fagor–MBK
- Fibok–Müller
- Gewiss–Bianchi
- Gis Gelati–Jollyscarpe
- Magniflex–Centroscarpa
- Paini–Bottecchia–Sidi
- Panasonic–Isostar
- Remac–Fanini
- Roland–Skala
- Selca
- Toshiba–Look
- Transvemij–Van Schilt–Hoonved
- Zahor Chocolates–Tokke

== Pre-race favorites ==
Reigning champion Roberto Visentini returned to the race in 1987 to defend his crown, despite not winning many races in his spring campaign. Francesco Moser, who won in 1984 and finished in the top three in 1985 and 1986, did not participate because of a head trauma and bruises sustained in a crash in the weeks prior to the race. Spanish sports newspaper El Mundo Deportivo and Gian Paolo Ormezzano from Italy's La Stampa named several other riders as contenders for the overall classification, such as Giuseppe Saronni, then-world champion Moreno Argentin, Stephen Roche, and Robert Millar. Since Toshiba–Look team leader Greg LeMond did not participate in the race due to injuries sustained in a hunting accident, El Mundo Deportivo believed Jean-François Bernard to be a dark horse. L'Unità writer Gino Sala believed Roche, Saronni, and Visentini were the top three challengers for the overall crown.

Climbers Gianbattista Baronchelli, Éric Caritoux, Franco Chioccioli, Marino Lejarreta, and Millar were expected to contend for mountains classification. Several writers felt Argentin, Guido Bontempi, Urs Freuler, Eddy Planckaert, and Paolo Rosola all had a great chance to win a stage in the race. Mario Fossati of La Repubblica also thought that Bernard, Bontempi, and Phil Anderson could take a stage win. Anderson returned to cycling at the Giro following a lengthy battle with a virus. Due to Rolf Sørensen's victory at the Tirreno–Adriatico he was seen as an outside contender, but there were questions over his ability to climb in the high mountains.

There was a strong belief that the race would be a battle between Carrera Jeans–Vagabond teammates Visentini and Roche. El Mundo Deportivo stated that Visentini had the edge in the time trial discipline and sprinting, while Roche had the advantage in climbing mountains. However, unlike Visentini, Roche came into the race in great shape after winning the Tour de Romandie and placing second in the Liège–Bastogne–Liège and the Critérium International. Cycling expert and author Bill McGann thought that the race would be disputed between Visentini and Baronchelli.

== Route and stages ==
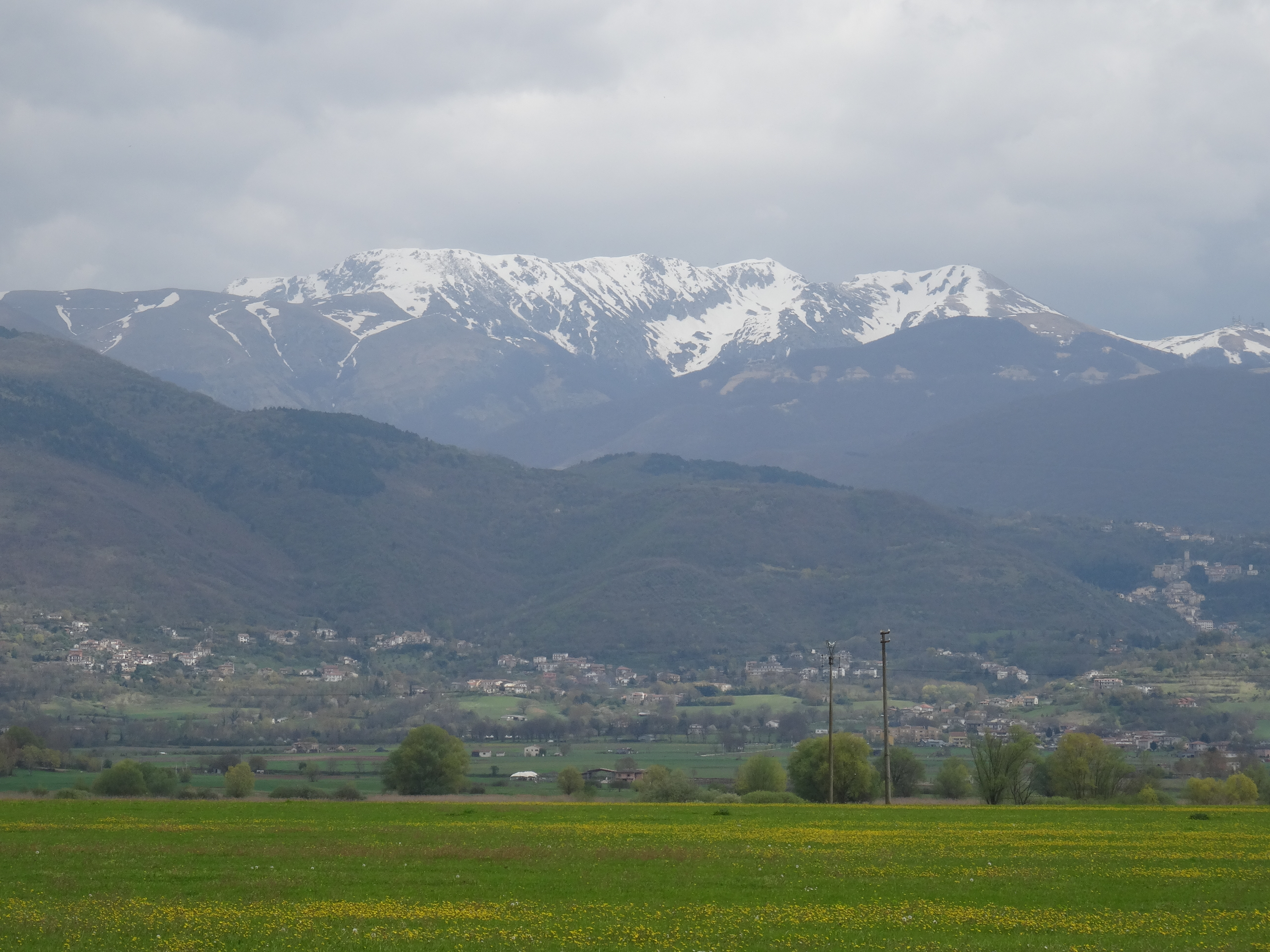
Monte Terminillo hosted the end of the 134 km (83 mi) sixth stage and the start of the 205 km (127 mi) seventh stage.

The route for the 1987 edition of the Giro d'Italia was revealed to the public on television by head organizer Vincenzo Torriani on 21 February 1987. Covering a total of 3,915 km (2,433 mi), it included five time trials (four individual and one for teams), and thirteen stages with categorized climbs that awarded mountains classification points. The course featured a total of 25,380 m (83,270 ft) climbing, 4,220 m (13,850 ft) more than the previous edition. Five of these thirteen stages had summit finishes: stage 1a, to San Romolo; stage 6, to Monte Terminillo; stage 15, to Sappada; stage 19, to Madesimo; and stage 21, to Pila. Another stage with a mountain-top finish was stage 13, which consisted of a climbing time trial to San Marino. The organizers chose to include one rest day between stages 10 and 11. When compared to the previous Giro, the race had the same number of stages – although one stage consisted of two half-stages – but was 56.4 km (35 mi) longer and contained an additional individual time trial. The sixteenth stage, which ran from Sappada to Canazei, was named the queen stage for its five categorized climbs.

Race director Torriani was happy with the success the 1985 Giro d'Italia had when passing through the Aosta Valley and chose to include this mountainous region, which lies adjacent to the Rhône-Alpes, in the 1987 route. With the Giro's return to the valley, La Stampa and the regional cycling federation director, Maggiorino Ferrero, speculated that the stages taking place in this region would be critical in deciding the general classification. Carlo Champvillair, a climbing champion of Aosta Valley, believed it to be a well-constructed, technical race route. The time trial in San Marino, the sixth stage with the finish atop Monte Terminillo, and the stages including the Dolomites were seen by L'Unità writer Gino Sala as stages that would heavily influence the general classification. In addition, he said that the route was suited to well-rounded, strong, and durable riders. The prologue contained a descent of the Poggio, a mountain used frequently in the Milan–San Remo, and was considered dangerous by some critics. However, Torriani decided to include the descent.

Stage characteristics and winners
Stage	Date	Course	Distance	Type	Winner
P	21 May	San Remo	4 km (2 mi)	Individual time trial	Roberto Visentini (ITA)
1a	22 May	San Remo to San Romolo	31 km (19 mi)	Stage with mountain(s)	Erik Breukink (NED)
1b	22 May	Poggio di San Remo to San Remo	8 km (5 mi)	Individual time trial	Stephen Roche (IRL)
2	23 May	Imperia to Borgo Val di Taro	242 km (150 mi)	Stage with mountain(s)	Moreno Argentin (ITA)
3	24 May	Lerici to Camaiore	43 km (27 mi)	Team time trial	Carrera Jeans–Vagabond
4	25 May	Camaiore to Montalcino	203 km (126 mi)	Stage with mountain(s)	Moreno Argentin (ITA)
5	26 May	Montalcino to Terni	208 km (129 mi)	Plain stage	Eddy Planckaert (BEL)
6	27 May	Terni to Monte Terminillo	134 km (83 mi)	Stage with mountain(s)	Jean-Claude Bagot (FRA)
7	28 May	Rieti to Roccaraso	205 km (127 mi)	Stage with mountain(s)	Moreno Argentin (ITA)
8	29 May	Roccaraso to San Giorgio del Sannio	168 km (104 mi)	Plain stage	Paolo Rosola (ITA)
9	30 May	San Giorgio del Sannio to Bari	257 km (160 mi)	Plain stage	Urs Freuler (SUI)
10	31 May	Bari to Termoli	210 km (130 mi)	Plain stage	Paolo Rosola (ITA)
	1 June	Rest day			
11	2 June	Giulianova to Osimo	245 km (152 mi)	Stage with mountain(s)	Robert Forest (FRA)
12	3 June	Osimo to Bellaria	197 km (122 mi)	Plain stage	Guido Bontempi (ITA)
13	4 June	Rimini to City of San Marino (San Marino)	46 km (29 mi)	Individual time trial	Roberto Visentini (ITA)
14	5 June	City of San Marino (San Marino) to Lido di Jesolo	260 km (162 mi)	Plain stage	Paolo Cimini (ITA)
15	6 June	Lido di Jesolo to Sappada	224 km (139 mi)	Stage with mountain(s)	Johan van der Velde (NED)
16	7 June	Sappada to Canazei	211 km (131 mi)	Stage with mountain(s)	Johan van der Velde (NED)
17	8 June	Canazei to Riva del Garda	206 km (128 mi)	Stage with mountain(s)	Marco Vitali (ITA)
18	9 June	Riva del Garda to Trescore Balneario	213 km (132 mi)	Plain stage	Giuseppe Calcaterra (ITA)
19	10 June	Trescore Balneario to Madesimo	160 km (99 mi)	Stage with mountain(s)	Jean-François Bernard (FRA)
20	11 June	Madesimo to Como	156 km (97 mi)	Plain stage	Paolo Rosola (ITA)
21	12 June	Como to Pila	252 km (157 mi)	Stage with mountain(s)	Robert Millar (GBR)
22	13 June	Aosta to Saint-Vincent	32 km (20 mi)	Individual time trial	Stephen Roche (IRL)
	Total		3,915 km (2,433 mi)		

Stage 20 was run as a "Giri-sprint": the stage ended with 10 laps of 4 km around Como, and a small time bonus was given every time that the finish line was crossed.

== Race overview ==
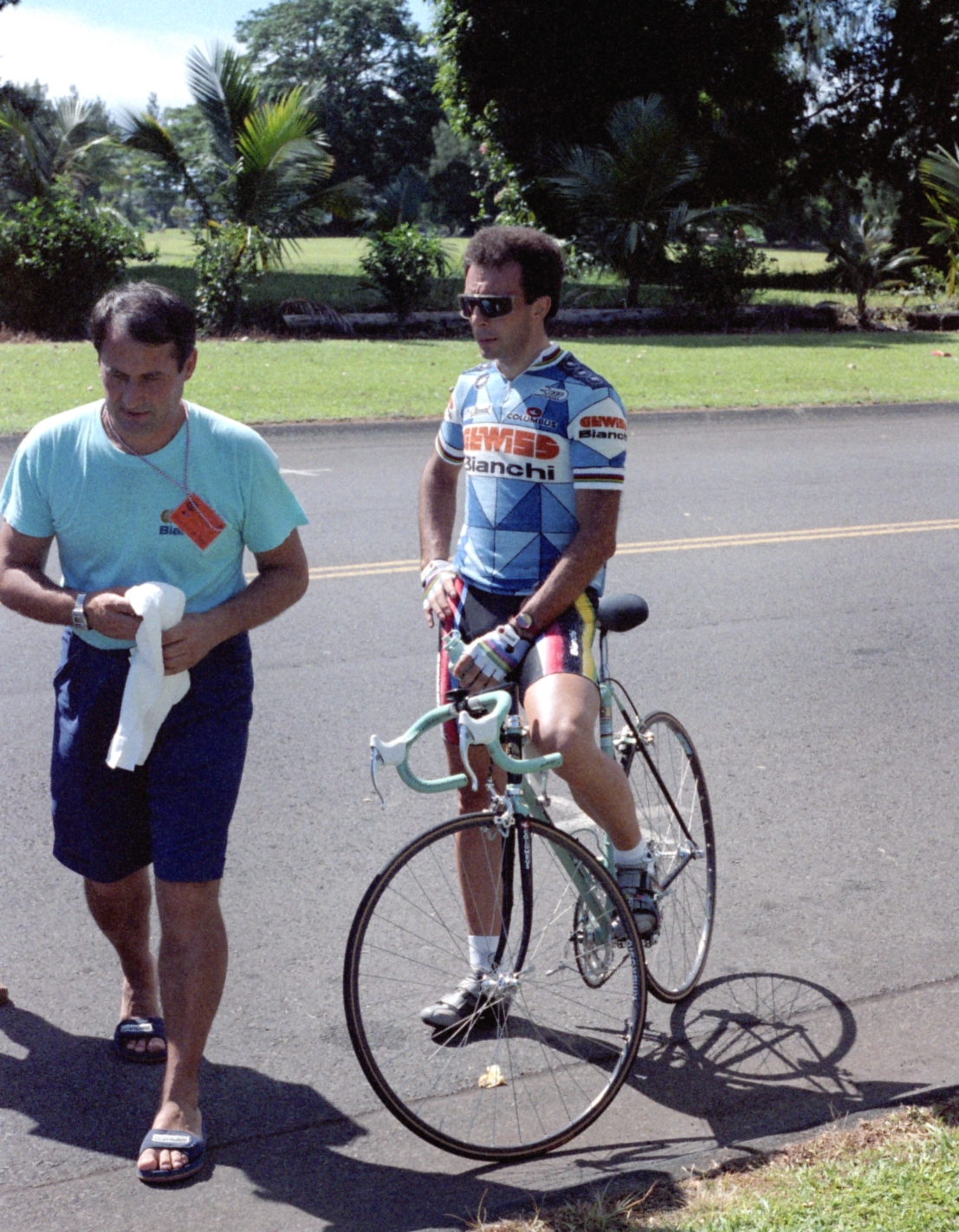
Moreno Argentin (pictured during the Coors Classic in 1987) won three individual stages at the 1987 Giro.

The Giro began with a 4 km (2.5 mi) prologue through the streets of San Remo. The returning winner of the Giro, Roberto Visentini, won the prologue by two tenths of a second over the Canadian rider Steve Bauer. The next race day held two stages: a 31 km (19.3 mi) stage with a summit finish, followed by a downhill individual time trial. Panasonic–Isostar's Erik Breukink took the climbing half-stage win with a solo attack. His performance earned him the race leader's maglia rosa (English: pink jersey), which he kept until the third stage. Stephen Roche won the time trial half-stage with a three-second margin over Del Tongo's Lech Piasecki. Johan van der Velde formed a lead group with about 30 km (18.6 mi) to go in the second stage, but as he posed a threat to the race lead, he was not given a large advantage and was subsequently caught by the chasing peloton 7 km (4.3 mi) from the finish. The main field remained intact for the remaining kilometers and the race geared up for a sprint finish won by Moreno Argentin.

The third stage was a lengthy team time trial that stretched for 43 km (26.7 mi) between Lerici and Camaiore. Carrera Jeans–Vagabond beat out the Del Tongo squad by fifty-four seconds to win the leg. In addition to the stage victory, Carrera Jeans–Vagabond's Roche took the overall lead. As the leading group approached the fourth stage finish line, Argentin sprinted away with 800 m (2,625 ft) to go and created a two-second gap between himself and the rider in second place that was enough to earn him a second stage win. The fifth stage was relatively flat and was used to set up the race to enter the Apennine Mountains the following day. The leg culminated in a mass sprint that was won by Panasonic–Isostar's Belgian rider Eddy Planckaert, after overcoming Paolo Rosola in the closing meters.

Roche defended his race lead until stage thirteen, a 46 km (28.6 mi) climbing individual time trial to Monte Titano in San Marino, where he lost the pink jersey to his teammate and stage winner Visentini. Roche claimed his performance in the stage was hampered due to injuries sustained from a crash in the tenth stage. At 260 km (161.6 mi), the fourteenth stage was the longest of the race. It was won in a mass sprint by Remac Fanini's Paolo Cimini, who overtook Rosola in the final meters.

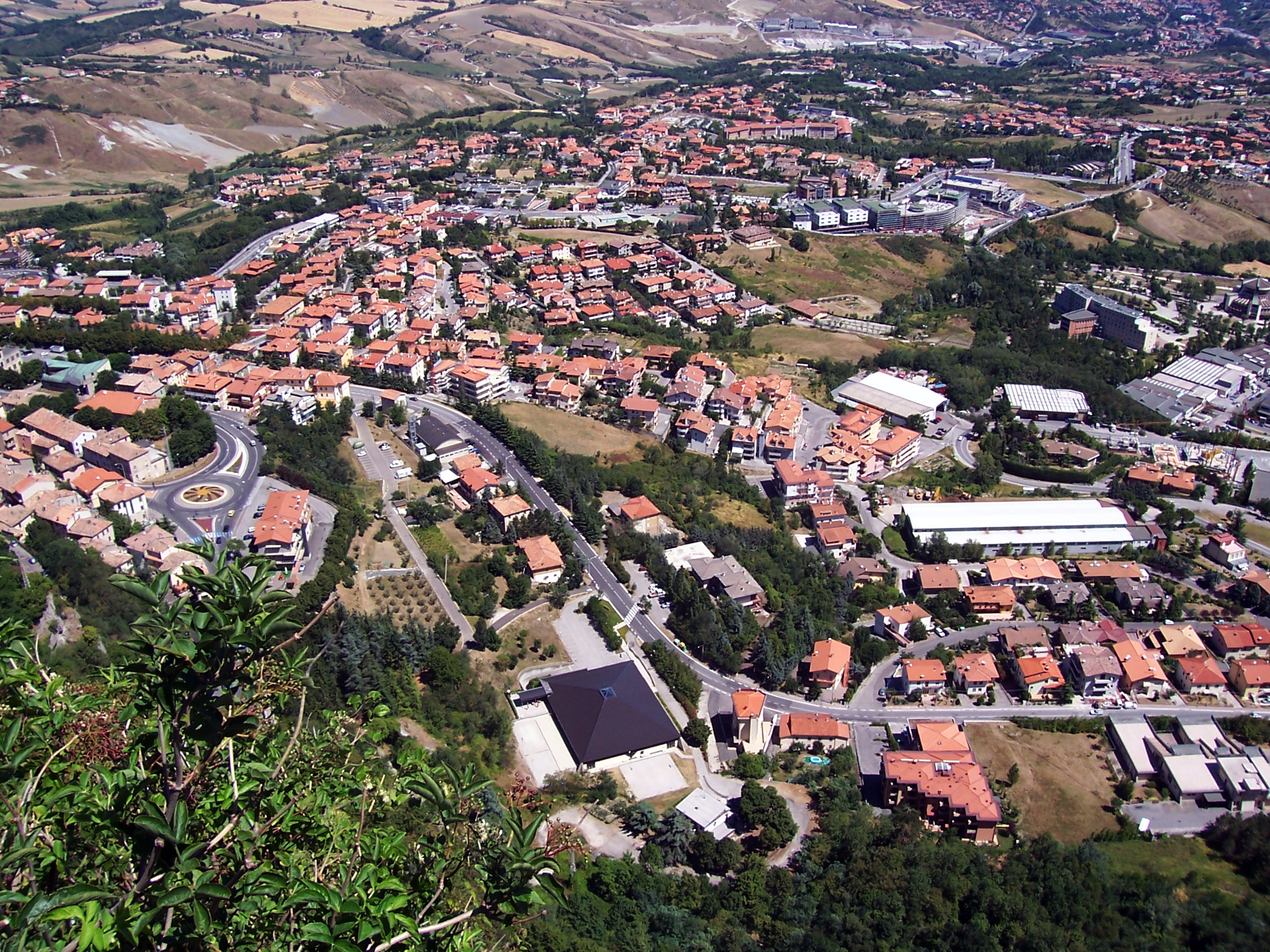
San Marino hosted the end of the stage 13 individual time trial, as well as the start of the 260 km (161.6 mi) fourteenth stage.

The fifteenth stage saw the race enter the Dolomites and traverse three major climbs within the mountain chain. On the descent of the Monte Rest, Roche formed a leading group with two other riders after speeding away from the race leader's group. Despite orders from his team management, Roche continued with the move. The Carrera Jeans-Vagabond pack chased after the Roche group to protect the advantage of Roche's teammate and race leader Visentini. Roche crossed the finish line in twelfth place, fifty-six seconds after the stage winner van der Velde, which allowed him to don again the pink jersey by five seconds over Tony Rominger. Roche's actions, taking the race lead away from Visentini and disobeying team commands, gained him the hatred of the Italian cycling fans.

The sixteenth leg of the race included five categorized climbs before concluding in the municipality of Canazei. On the descent of the Pordoi Pass, van der Velde broke away and caught up to the leader on the road before winning his second consecutive stage. Meanwhile, behind van der Velde, Visentini tried several times to attack Roche on the slopes of the Passo Fedaia; however, Roche marked all of his moves and the two raced to the finish in the same group. Stage 17, the race's final day in the Dolomites, was marred by poor weather. A breakaway group of three was given a significant gap as the main general classification contenders rode behind in a collective group. Atala Ofmega's Italian rider Marco Vitali out-sprinted his two fellow breakaway members to win his first Grand Tour stage win.

As the eighteenth stage began, the peloton felt they deserved a rest day after three difficult stages in the Dolomites and collectively rode at a non-aggressive pace for over three-quarters of the stage. Riders began to attack and form breakaway groups with about 30 km (18.6 mi) to go; however, the sprinters' teams reeled in all attacks and prepared for a sprint finish that was eventually won by Giuseppe Calcaterra, making it the second consecutive stage win for Atala-Ofmega. During the nineteenth stage, Jean-François Bernard launched an attack after the leading group finished the climb of the San Marco Pass. Three riders joined Bernard before the start of the final climb in Madesimo, but Bernard dropped them early on in the climb and rode the final 18 km (11.2 mi) alone to win the stage. Millar and Lejarreta managed to gain over thirty seconds on Roche after they attacked on the final climb. Despite a crash within the final kilometer of stage twenty, the main field managed to hold a bunch sprint that was won by Rosola.

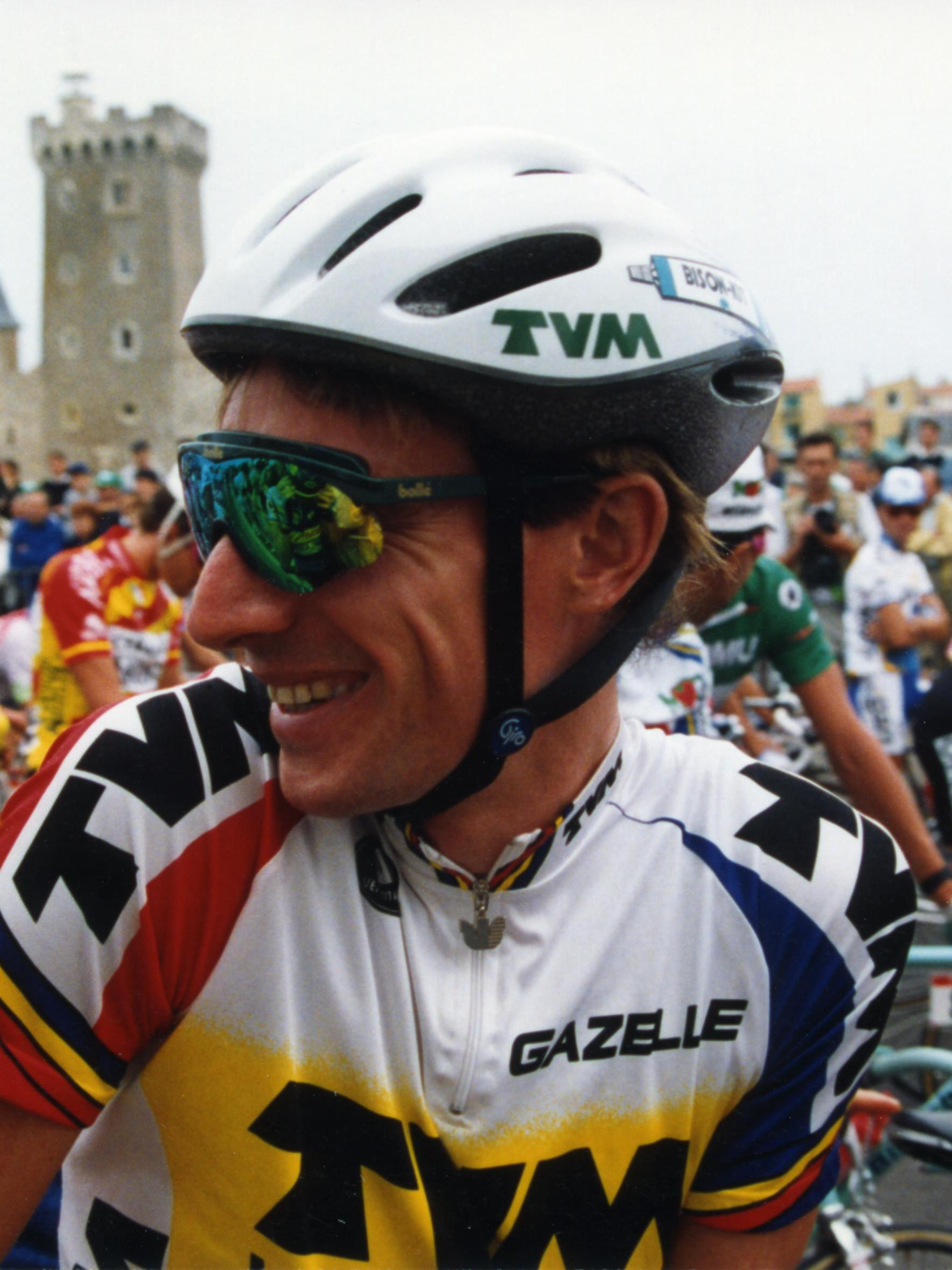
By winning the twenty-first stage, Robert Millar (pictured here on the Tour de France in 1993) vaulted to second overall.

In the twenty-first leg, the general classification contenders were a part of the same leading group until the final climb to the summit finish in Pila. Lejarreta attacked 12 km (7.5 mi) from the finish and only seven other riders were able to mark, including Millar and Roche. Over 6 km (3.7 mi) later, the Spaniard attacked again and only Roche and Millar remained with him. Despite further attacks by Lejarreta, the group rode together up to the finish. With over 300 m (984.3 ft) to go, Millar unleashed a sprint that won him the stage. Millar's performance on the stay brought him to second place overall. The final stage of the 1987 Giro d'Italia was a 32 km (19.9 mi) individual time trial. Visentini, who had crashed in the previous stage, did not start and abandoned the race. Roche beat out the second-place finisher, Dietrich Thurau, by fourteen seconds to win the day and the overall race itself. In doing so, Roche became the first Irishman to win the Giro d'Italia. The other podium positions were filled by non-Italian riders for the second time in the history of the race.

Four riders achieved multiple stage victories: Argentin (stages 2, 4, and 7), Rosola (stages 8, 10, and 20), Visentini (prologue and stage 13), and Roche (stages 1b and 22). Stage wins were achieved by seven of the twenty competing squads, five of which won multiple stages. Gewiss-Bianchi collected a total of six stage wins through two riders, Argentin and Rosola. Carrera Jeans-Vagabond achieved the same feat with individual stage wins from Bontempi (stage 12), Roche and Visentini (two wins each), and a team time trial win (stage 3). Panasonic–Isostar amassed a total of three stage victories through Breukink (stage 1a), Planckaert (stage 5), and Millar (stage 21). Atala-Ofmega also secured three stage wins, through Freuler (stage 9), Vitali (stage 17), and Calcaterra (stage 18). Gis Gelati–Jollyscarpe won two stages with van der Velde (stages 15 and 16). Fagor–MBK also collected two stage successes, with Jean-Claude Bagot (stage 6) and Robert Forest (stage 11). Remac–Fanini and Toshiba–Look both won a single stage at the Giro, the first through Cimini (stage 14), and the second through Bernard (stage 19).

== Classification leadership ==
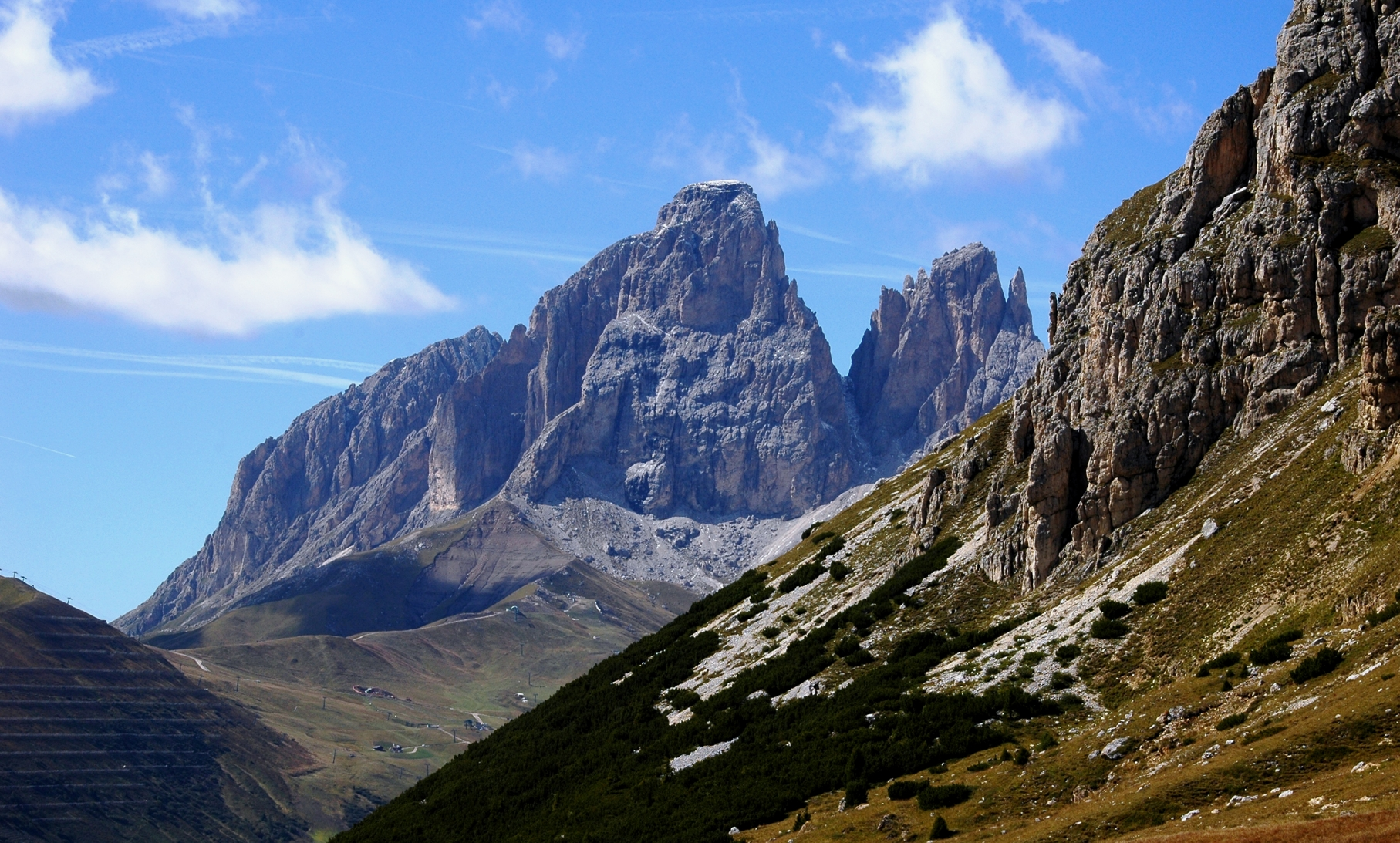
The Pordoi Pass was the Cima Coppi for the 1987 running of the Giro d'Italia.

Four different jerseys were worn during the 1987 Giro d'Italia. The leader of the general classification – calculated by adding the stage finish times of each rider, and allowing time bonuses for the first three finishers on mass-start stages – wore a pink jersey. The time bonuses for the 1987 Giro were twenty seconds for the first place, fifteen seconds for the second place, ten seconds for the third place, and five seconds for the fourth place on the stage. This classification is the most important of the race, and its winner is considered to be the winner of the Giro.

For the points classification, which awarded a purple (or cyclamen) jersey to its leader, cyclists were given points for finishing a stage in the top 15.No points were given at intermediate sprints.

The green jersey was awarded to the mountains classification leader. In this ranking, points were won by reaching the summit of a climb ahead of other cyclists. Each climb was ranked as either first, second or third category, with more points available for higher category climbs. The Cima Coppi, the race's highest point of elevation, awarded more points than the other first category climbs.The Cima Coppi for this edition of the Giro was the Passo Pordoi, and the first rider to cross it was Fagor–MBK's Jean-Claude Bagot.

The white jersey was worn by the leader of young rider classification, a ranking decided the same way as the general classification, but considering only neo-professional cyclists (in their first three years of professional racing).

Although no jersey was awarded, there was also one classification for the teams, in which the stage finish times of the best three cyclists per team were added; the leading team was the one with the lowest total time.

Additionally, there were several minor classifications. There was a FIAT Uno classification, which gave points to the first riders that reached the red triangle 1 km before the finish line. There were two intermediate sprint classifications, the "Traguardi rotanti" and the "Vola al Cinema". There was also a combination classification.

Classification leadership by stage
Stage	Winner	General classification	Points classification	Mountains classification	Young rider classification	Team classification
P	Roberto Visentini	Roberto Visentini	not awarded	not awarded	Lech Piasecki	Carrera Jeans–Vagabond
1a	Erik Breukink	Erik Breukink	Erik Breukink	Erik Breukink	Lech Piasecki	Panasonic–Isostar
1b	Stephen Roche	Erik Breukink	Erik Breukink	Erik Breukink	Lech Piasecki	Panasonic–Isostar
2	Moreno Argentin	Erik Breukink	Erik Breukink	Robert Millar	Lech Piasecki	Panasonic–Isostar
3	Carrera Jeans–Vagabond	Stephen Roche	Erik Breukink	Robert Millar	Lech Piasecki	Carrera Jeans–Vagabond
4	Moreno Argentin	Stephen Roche	Stephen Roche	Robert Millar	Lech Piasecki	Carrera Jeans–Vagabond
5	Eddy Planckaert	Stephen Roche	Stephen Roche	Robert Millar	Lech Piasecki	Carrera Jeans–Vagabond
6	Jean-Claude Bagot	Stephen Roche	Stephen Roche	Robert Millar	Tony Rominger	Carrera Jeans–Vagabond
7	Moreno Argentin	Stephen Roche	Moreno Argentin	Robert Millar	Tony Rominger	Carrera Jeans–Vagabond
8	Paolo Rosola	Stephen Roche	Moreno Argentin	Robert Millar	Tony Rominger	Carrera Jeans–Vagabond
9	Urs Freuler	Stephen Roche	Moreno Argentin	Robert Millar	Tony Rominger	Carrera Jeans–Vagabond
10	Paolo Rosola	Stephen Roche	Paolo Rosola	Robert Millar	Tony Rominger	Carrera Jeans–Vagabond
11	Robert Forest	Stephen Roche	Paolo Rosola	Robert Millar	Tony Rominger	Carrera Jeans–Vagabond
12	Guido Bontempi	Stephen Roche	Paolo Rosola	Robert Millar	Tony Rominger	Carrera Jeans–Vagabond
13	Roberto Visentini	Roberto Visentini	Paolo Rosola	Robert Millar	Tony Rominger	Carrera Jeans–Vagabond
14	Paolo Cimini	Roberto Visentini	Paolo Rosola	Robert Millar	Tony Rominger	Carrera Jeans–Vagabond
15	Johan van der Velde	Stephen Roche	Paolo Rosola	Robert Millar	Tony Rominger	Panasonic–Isostar
16	Johan van der Velde	Stephen Roche	Paolo Rosola	Robert Millar	Tony Rominger	Panasonic–Isostar
17	Marco Vitali	Stephen Roche	Johan van der Velde	Robert Millar	Tony Rominger	Panasonic–Isostar
18	Giuseppe Calcaterra	Stephen Roche	Johan van der Velde	Robert Millar	Tony Rominger	Panasonic–Isostar
19	Jean-François Bernard	Stephen Roche	Johan van der Velde	Robert Millar	Roberto Conti	Panasonic–Isostar
20	Paolo Rosola	Stephen Roche	Johan van der Velde	Robert Millar	Roberto Conti	Panasonic–Isostar
21	Robert Millar	Stephen Roche	Johan van der Velde	Robert Millar	Roberto Conti	Panasonic–Isostar
22	Stephen Roche	Stephen Roche	Johan van der Velde	Robert Millar	Roberto Conti	Panasonic–Isostar
Final		Stephen Roche	Johan van der Velde	Robert Millar	Roberto Conti	Panasonic–Isostar

== Final standings ==
Legend
Pink jersey	Denotes the winner of the General classification
Green jersey	Denotes the winner of the Mountains classification
Purple jersey	Denotes the winner of the Points classification
White jersey	Denotes the winner of the Young rider classification

=== General classification ===
Final general classification (1–10)
Rank	Name	Team	Time
1	Stephen Roche (IRL)	Carrera Jeans–Vagabond	105h 39' 42"
2	Robert Millar (GBR)	Panasonic–Isostar	+ 3' 40"
3	Erik Breukink (NED)	Panasonic–Isostar	+ 4' 17"
4	Marino Lejarreta (ESP)	Caja Rural–Seat	+ 5' 11"
5	Flavio Giupponi (ITA)	Del Tongo	+ 7' 42"
6	Marco Giovannetti (ITA)	Gis Gelati–Jollyscarpe	+ 11' 05"
7	Phil Anderson (AUS)	Panasonic–Isostar	+ 13' 36"
8	Peter Winnen (NED)	Panasonic–Isostar	+ 13' 56"
9	Johan van der Velde (NED)	Gis Gelati–Jollyscarpe	+ 13' 57"
10	Steve Bauer (CAN)	Toshiba–Look	+ 14' 41"

Final general classification (11–133)
Rank	Name	Team	Time
11	Jokin Mújika (ESP)	Caja Rural–Seat	+ 15' 14"
12	Eddy Schepers (BEL)	Carrera Jeans–Vagabond	+ 18' 26"
13	Claudio Savini (ITA)	Fibok–Müller	+ 20' 07"
14	Franco Chioccioli (ITA)	Gis Gelati–Jollyscarpe	+ 20' 39"
15	Roberto Conti (ITA)	Selca–Conti	+ 20' 49"
16	Jean-François Bernard (FRA)	Toshiba–Look	+ 21' 39"
17	Mario Beccia (ITA)	Remac–Fanini	+ 22' 12"
18	Pedro Muñoz Machín Rodríguez (ESP)	Fagor–MBK	+ 23' 29"
19	Jiří Škoda (CZE)	Ecoflam–B.F.B.–Mareco	+ 26' 37"
20	Emmanuele Bombini (ITA)	Gewiss–Bianchi	+ 27' 15"
21	Éric Caritoux (FRA)	Fagor–MBK	+ 28' 15"
22	Alessandro Pozzi (ITA)	Del Tongo	+ 28' 37"
23	Alberto Volpi (ITA)	Gewiss–Bianchi	+ 29' 51"
24	Rodolfo Massi (ITA)	Magniflex	+ 35' 11"
25	Jean-Claude Bagot (FRA)	Fagor–MBK	+ 36' 30"
26	Andreas Kappes (FRG)	Toshiba–Look	+ 37' 18"
27	Guy Nulens (BEL)	Panasonic–Isostar	+ 40' 21"
28	Robert Forest (FRA)	Fagor–MBK	+ 41' 31"
29	Alessandro Paganessi (ITA)	Ariostea–Gres	+ 42' 23"
30	Stefano Tomasini (ITA)	Remac–Fanini	+ 43' 29"
31	Moreno Argentin (ITA)	Gewiss–Bianchi	+ 45' 15"
32	Franco Vona (ITA)	Brianzoli	+ 48' 01"
33	Alfio Vandi (ITA)	Ariostea–Gres	+ 48' 56"
34	Kjell Nilsson (SWE)	Ariostea–Gres	+ 49' 53"
35	Gianluca Brugnami (ITA)	Paini–Bottecchia	+ 55' 35"
36	Alberto Elli (ITA)	Remac–Fanini	+ 57' 10"
37	Juan Tomas Martínez (ESP)	Zahor Chocolates–Tokke	+ 59' 51"
38	Mauro-Antonio Santaromita (ITA)	Magniflex	+ 1h 01' 05"
39	Ennio Vanotti (ITA)	Del Tongo	+ 1h 04' 46"
40	Marino Amadori (ITA)	Ecoflam–B.F.B.–Mareco	+ 1h 15' 54"
41	Roberto Pagnin (ITA)	Gewiss–Bianchi	+ 1h 16' 09"
42	Alessandro Giannelli (ITA)	Magniflex	+ 1h 20' 03"
43	Davide Cassani (ITA)	Carrera Jeans–Vagabond	+ 1h 21' 09"
44	Hennie Kuiper (NED)	Roland–Skala	+ 1h 21' 44"
45	Angel de las Heras (ESP)	Zahor Chocolates–Tokke	+ 1h 23' 37"
46	Enrico Pochini (ITA)	Fibok–Müller	+ 1h 26' 42"
47	Renato Piccolo (ITA)	Gewiss–Bianchi	+ 1h 29' 01"
48	Claudio Chiappucci (ITA)	Carrera Jeans–Vagabond	+ 1h 29' 23"
49	Luigi Furlan (ITA)	Paini–Bottecchia	+ 1h 29' 29"
50	Maurizio Vandelli (ITA)	Ariostea–Gres	+ 1h 29' 36"
51	Czesław Lang (POL)	Del Tongo	+ 1h 34' 11"
52	Dietrich Thurau (FRG)	Roland-Skala	+ 1h 34' 59"
53	Lech Piasecki (POL)	Del Tongo	+ 1h 39' 22"
54	Marco Saligari (ITA)	Ariostea–Gres	+ 1h 40' 43"
55	Philippe Chevallier (FRA)	Toshiba–Look	+ 1h 41' 06"
56	Jesus Ibañez (ESP)	Zahor Chocolates–Tokke	+ 1h 43' 20"
57	Bruno Leali (ITA)	Carrera Jeans–Vagabond	+ 1h 43' 48"
58	Eduardo Rocchi (ITA)	Selca–Conti	+ 1h 44' 12"
59	Dag Erik Pedersen (NOR)	Ariostea–Gres	+ 1h 44' 53"
60	Massimo Ghirotto (ITA)	Carrera Jeans–Vagabond	+ 1h 45' 39"
61	Richard Trinkler (SUI)	Fibok–Müller	+ 1h 45' 51"
62	Jean Habets (NED)	Transvemij–Van Schilt–Hoonved	+ 1h 47' 56"
63	Marco Vitali (ITA)	Atala–Ofmega	+ 1h 50' 51"
64	Fabrizio Vannucci (ITA)	Selca–Conti	+ 1h 51' 12"
65	Hubert Seize (SUI)	Brianzoli	+ 1h 52' 15"
66	Marco Tabai (ITA)	Remac–Fanini	+ 1h 54' 58"
67	Sergio Finazzi (ITA)	Remac–Fanini	+ 1h 55' 35"
68	Benny Van Brabant (BEL)	Selca–Conti	+ 1h 58' 42"
69	Henk Lubberding (NED)	Panasonic–Isostar	+ 1h 59' 45"
70	Luigi Botteon (ITA)	Remac–Fanini	+ 2h 00' 19"
71	Pierino Gavazzi (ITA)	Remac–Fanini	+ 2h 00' 29"
72	Daniël Wyder (SUI)	Transvemij–Van Schilt–Hoonved	+ 2h 05' 12"
73	Patrick Serra (SWE)	Ariostea–Gres	+ 2h 06' 37"
74	Valerio Piva (ITA)	Ariostea–Gres	+ 2h 10' 34"
75	Mario Noris (ITA)	Atala–Ofmega	+ 2h 15' 31"
76	Santiago Portillo (ESP)	Zahor Chocolates–Tokke	+ 2h 23' 41"
77	Giuseppe Petito (ITA)	Gis Gelati–Jollyscarpe	+ 2h 24' 00"
78	Antonio Bevilacqua (ITA)	Brianzoli	+ 2h 24' 23"
79	Roland le Clerc (FRA)	Caja Rural–Seat	+ 2h 24' 26"
80	Sergio Scremin (ITA)	Paini–Bottecchia	+ 2h 25' 54"
81	Camillo Passera (ITA)	Ecoflam–B.F.B.–Mareco	+ 2h 27' 05"
82	Januus Kuum (NOR)	Toshiba–Look	+ 2h 25' 15"
83	Ennio Salvador (ITA)	Gis Gelati–Jollyscarpe	+ 2h 28' 43"
84	Bruno Cenghialta (ITA)	Magniflex	+ 2h 29' 27"
85	Pascal Jules (FRA)	Caja Rural–Seat	+ 2h 30' 40"
86	Orlando Maini (ITA)	Ecoflam–B.F.B.–Mareco	+ 2h 31' 43"
87	Francesco Rossignoli (ITA)	Carrera Jeans–Vagabond	+ 2h 32' 07"
88	Paolo Cimini (ITA)	Remac–Fanini	+ 2h 33' 16"
89	Maurizio Rossi (ITA)	Ecoflam–B.F.B.–Mareco	+ 2h 34' 58"
90	Ludwig Wijnants (BEL)	Roland–Skala	+ 2h 34' 59"
91	Marco Franceschini (ITA)	Fibok–Müller	+ 2h 26' 55"
92	Romano Randi (ITA)	Selca–Conti	+ 2h 40' 40"
93	Gody Schmutz (SUI)	Fibok–Müller	+ 2h 41' 02"
94	Juan Fernández Martín (ESP)	Zahor Chocolates–Tokke	+ 2h 41' 45"
95	Rob Kleinsman (NED)	Transvemij–Van Schilt–Hoonved	+ 2h 42' 09"
96	Enrico Galleschi (ITA)	Magniflex	+ 2h 43' 59"
97	Luciano Boffo (ITA)	Ecoflam–B.F.B.–Mareco	+ 2h 49' 02"
98	Flavio Chesini (ITA)	Magniflex	+ 2h 51' 26"
99	Jaime Vilamajo (ESP)	Caja Rural–Seat	+ 2h 52' 54"
100	Brian Holm (DEN)	Roland–Skala	+ 2h 53' 00"
101	Paul Popp (AUT)	Paini–Bottecchia	+ 2h 55' 02"
102	Martin Schalkers (NED)	Transvemij–Van Schilt–Hoonved	+ 2h 55' 28"
103	Fabio Roscioli (ITA)	Ariostea–Gres	+ 2h 56' 45"
104	Urs Freuler (SUI)	Atala–Ofmega	+ 2h 59' 40"
105	José Julian Balaguer (ESP)	Caja Rural–Seat	+ 3h 00' 18"
106	Giuseppe Calcaterra (ITA)	Atala–Ofmega	+ 3h 04' 35"
107	Milan Jurčo (CZE)	Brianzoli	+ 3h 07' 43"
108	Guido Bontempi (ITA)	Carrera Jeans–Vagabond	+ 3h 10' 14"
109	Othmar Häfliger (SUI)	Toshiba–Look	+ 3h 12' 13"
110	Palmiro Masciarelli (ITA)	Gis Gelati–Jollyscarpe	+ 3h 12' 14"
111	Theo de Rooij (NED)	Panasonic–Isostar	+ 3h 12' 30"
112	Stefano Zanatta (ITA)	Brianzoli	+ 3h 14' 17"
113	Rudy Patry (BEL)	Roland–Skala	+ 3h 15' 09"
114	John Talen (NED)	Panasonic–Isostar	+ 3h 16' 08"
115	Dario Mariuzzo (ITA)	Gewiss–Bianchi	+ 3h 17' 37"
116	Salvatore Cavallaro (ITA)	Atala–Ofmega	+ 3h 20' 51"
117	Eddy Planckaert (BEL)	Panasonic–Isostar	+ 3h 24' 57"
118	Maurizio Colombo (ITA)	Del Tongo	+ 3h 25' 44"
119	Frank Hoste (BEL)	Fagor–MBK	+ 3h 29' 04"
120	Johan Lammerts (NED)	Toshiba–Look	+ 3h 30' 22"
121	Silvano Ricco (ITA)	Fibok–Müller	+ 3h 31' 02"
122	Alessio Di Basco (ITA)	Remac–Fanini	+ 3h 31' 30"
123	Christian Chaubet (FRA)	Fagor–MBK	+ 3h 32' 40"
124	Franco Ballerini (ITA)	Magniflex	+ 3h 35' 43"
125	Adriano Baffi (ITA)	Gis Gelati–Jollyscarpe	+ 3h 36' 38"
126	Paolo Rosola (ITA)	Gewiss–Bianchi	+ 3h 38' 57"
127	Jos Lammertink (NED)	Transvemij–Van Schilt–Hoonved	+ 3h 46' 39"
128	Stefano Allocchio (ITA)	Brianzoli	+ 3h 47' 14"
129	Enrico Grimani (ITA)	Magniflex	+ 3h 50' 02"
130	José Maria Palacin Salgado (ESP)	Zahor Chocolates–Tokke	+ 4h 02' 31"
131	Johan Capiot (BEL)	Roland–Skala	+ 4h 04' 03"
132	Jan Bogaert (BEL)	Transvemij–Van Schilt–Hoonved	+ 4h 17' 39"
133	Dante Morandi (ITA)	Atala–Ofmega	+ 4h 25' 33"

=== Points classification ===
Final points classification (1–5)
	Rider	Team	Points
1	Johan van der Velde (NED)	Gis Gelati–Jollyscarpe	175
2	Paolo Rosola (ITA)	Gewiss–Bianchi	171
3	Stephen Roche (IRL)	Carrera Jeans–Vagabond	153
4	Erik Breukink (NED)	Panasonic–Isostar	144
5	Marino Lejarreta (ESP)	Caja Rural–Seat	110

=== Mountains classification ===
Final mountains classification (1–5)
	Rider	Team	Points
1	Robert Millar (GBR)	Panasonic–Isostar	97
2	Jean-Claude Bagot (FRA)	Fagor–MBK	53
3	Johan van der Velde (NED)	Gis Gelati–Jollyscarpe	32
4	Roberto Pagnin (ITA)	Gewiss–Bianchi	26
4	Marino Lejarreta (ESP)	Caja Rural–Seat	26

=== Young rider classification ===
Final young rider classification (1–5)
	Rider	Team	Time
1	Roberto Conti (ITA)	Selca–Conti	106h 00' 33"
2	Jiří Škoda (CZE)	Ecoflam–B.F.B.–Mareco	+ 5' 48"
3	Rodolfo Massi (ITA)	Magniflex	+ 14' 22"
4	Andreas Kappes (FRG)	Toshiba–Look	+ 16' 29"
5	Stefano Tomasini (ITA)	Remac–Fanini	+ 20' 40"

=== Combination classification ===
Final combination classification (1–5)
	Rider	Team	Points
1	Stephen Roche (IRL)	Carrera Jeans–Vagabond	90
2	Robert Millar (GBR)	Panasonic–Isostar	69
3	Paolo Rosola (ITA)	Gewiss–Bianchi	60
4	Johan van der Velde (NED)	Gis Gelati–Jollyscarpe	59
5	Erik Breukink (NED)	Panasonic–Isostar	47

=== Traguardi Fiat Uno classification ===
Final traguardi fiat uno classification (1–5)
	Rider	Team	Points
1	Marco Vitali (ITA)	Atala–Ofmega	15
2	Erik Breukink (NED)	Panasonic–Isostar	14
3	Johan van der Velde (NED)	Gis Gelati–Jollyscarpe	12
4	Marino Lejarreta (ESP)	Caja Rural–Seat	11
5	Roberto Pagnin (ITA)	Gewiss–Bianchi	11

=== Vola al cinema classification ===
Final vola al cinema classification (1–5)
	Rider	Team	Points
1	Dante Morandi (ITA)	Atala–Ofmega	33
2	Flavio Chesini (ITA)	Magniflex	19
3	Marco Vitali (ITA)	Atala–Ofmega	17
4	John Talen (NED)	Panasonic–Isostar	15
5	Luigi Botteon (ITA)	Remac–Fanini	15

=== Intermediate sprints classification ===
Final intermediate sprints classification (1–5)
	Rider	Team	Points
1	Milan Jurčo (CZE)	Brianzoli	43
2	Luciano Boffo (ITA)	Ecoflam–B.F.B.–Mareco	21
3	Dante Morandi (ITA)	Atala–Ofmega	17
4	John Talen (NED)	Panasonic–Isostar	15
5	Flavio Chesini (ITA)	Magniflex	13

=== Team classification ===
Final team classification (1–3)
	Team	Time
1	Panasonic–Isostar–Colnago–Agu	313h 06' 14"
2	Carrera Jeans–Vagabond	+ 9' 03"
3	Gis Gelati–Jollyscarpe	+ 21' 25"

== Aftermath ==
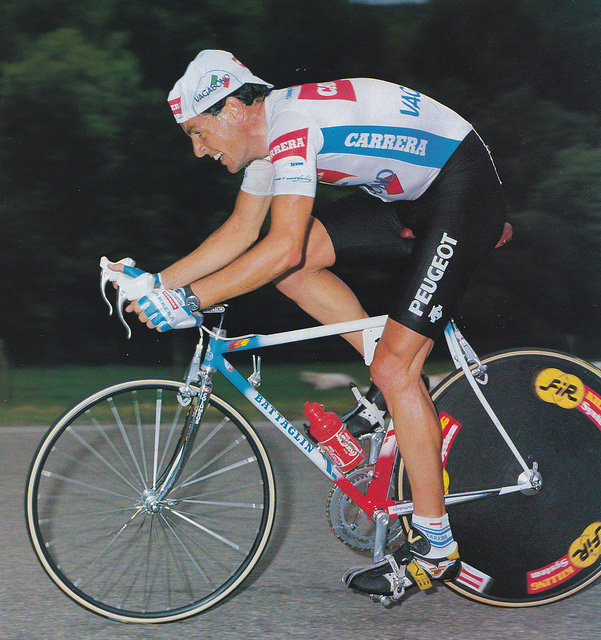
Stephen Roche (pictured during the 1987 Tour de France) won the Tour and the men's road race at the UCI Road World Championships in the same calendar year.

Upon completing the final stage, Roche told the media that by winning the final time trial he felt he silenced any critics who doubted whether he should have won the race. In addition, Roche announced his intention to compete in the Tour de France in July. He won the Tour with a margin of forty seconds over the second-place finisher and thus became the fifth rider to win the Giro and Tour in the same year. In September, Roche won the men's road race at the 1987 UCI Road World Championships and became the second rider to achieve the Triple Crown of Cycling, which consists of winning two Grand Tour races and the men's road race at the UCI Road World Championships in a calendar year. For his career successes in the Giro d'Italia, Roche was inducted into the race's Hall of Fame in 2014. After dropping out of the 1987 edition of the Giro, Visentini did not win any further stages or classifications in major races, and retired from cycling in 1990, at the age of 33.

La Repubblica stated that the Italian riders had the second worst performance in the history of the Giro after 1972, since none finished inside the top four and many famous Italian cyclists failed to complete the race. Mario Fossati, of La Repubblica, thought that van der Velde and Bernard performed very strongly, along with Argentin, who he said was operating on "alternating current". Fossati also said that Cimini and Calcaterra could have promising careers, based on their efforts during the race.

The 1987 Giro has become famous for the series of events involving teammates Roche and Visentini. Many writers highlight the fifteenth stage as the defining moment of the race. The Corriere delle Alpi and cycling book author Bill McGann even named it as one of the most famous in the Giro d'Italia and cycling history. On that day, Roche – who was second in the general classification and over two minutes behind race leader Visentini – attacked the lead, despite orders from his team to stop. Upon completing the stage, Visentini told the press that either Roche or himself would not start the following day, while Roche independently held a press conference from his hotel and answered questions. Carrera Jeans-Vagabond manager David Boifava ordered Roche and Visentini to stay silent. The following day, many Italian newspapers called Roche a betrayer or cheat for his actions. Despite Visentini's statement, both riders started the sixteenth stage after receiving orders from Carrera company boss Tito Tachella. In the days that followed, Italian fans threw things and spat at Roche, which led him to receive police protection until the race's conclusion. Looking back on the incident, Roche claimed that he just descended the mountain quicker than Visentini and did nothing wrong, while Visentini maintained that Roche attacked him when he should have been aiding him. Visentini accused Roche of dashing the team's morale and strategy, but some critics believed that Roche's actions were acceptable because he was the stronger rider.
