= Juan Tomás Martínez =

Personal information
- Full name: Juan Tomás Martínez Gutierrez
- Nickname: El volcán de Baracaldo (The volcano of Barakaldo)
- Born: 16 July 1962 (age 64) Barakaldo, Spain

Cycling career
- Sport: Cycling
- Current team: Retired
- Discipline: Road
- Role: Rider

Professional teams
- 1985: Hueso Chocolates
- 1986–1989: Zahor Chocolates
- 1990–1992: Lotus–Festina
- 1993: Sicasal–Acral
- 1994–1995: Euskadi–Petronor

Juan Tomás Martínez Gutierrez (born 16 July 1962 in Barakaldo) is a Spanish former professional road cyclist.

== Major results ==
1985
3rd Subida a Arrate
10th Clásica de San Sebastián
1986
2nd Overall Vuelta a los Valles Mineros

1st Stage 2a

1987
8th Overall Euskal Bizikleta
1988
3rd Overall Vuelta a Murcia
9th Overall Euskal Bizikleta
1989
4th Overall Vuelta a Andalucía
4th Overall Euskal Bizikleta
6th Overall Setmana Catalana de Ciclisme
7th Subida al Naranco
9th Clásica de San Sebastián
1990
4th Road race, National Road Championships
1994
6th Subida a Urkiola

=== Grand Tour general classification results timeline ===
Grand Tour	1985	1986	1987	1988	1989	1990	1991	1992	1993	1994
Giro d'Italia	—	—	37	16	—	—	19	15	—	—
Tour de France	—	—	—	—	—	—	—	—	—	—
Vuelta a España	16	21	14	25	32	—	34	—	42	57
