= Marco Bergamo (cyclist) =

Italian cyclist

Personal information
- Born: 12 April 1964 (age 62) Cles, Italy

Cycling career
- Sport: Cycling
- Role: Rider

Marco Bergamo (born 12 April 1964) is an Italian former professional racing cyclist. He rode in one edition of the Tour de France, Giro d'Italia and the Vuelta a España.
