= Francisco Navarro Fuster =

Spanish cyclist

Personal information
- Born: 20 December 1962 (age 63) Bétera, Spain
- Height: 1.87 m (6 ft 2 in)
- Weight: 77 kg (170 lb)

Cycling career
- Sport: Cycling
- Discipline: Road
- Role: Rider

Professional teams
- 1985–1986: Reynolds
- 1987: Dormilón
- 1988–1989: Seur–Campagnolo–Bic
- 1990: Tulip Computers

Major wins
- Grand Tours Vuelta a España 1 individual stage (1988)

Francisco Navarro Fuster (born 20 December 1962) is a Spanish former professional racing cyclist. He rode in the 1985 Tour de France.

== Major results ==
1988
1st Stage 4 Vuelta a España
1st Stage 5a Vuelta a Cantabria
1989
1st Stage 6a (ITT) Volta ao Algarve

=== Grand Tour general classification results timeline ===
Grand Tour	1985	1986	1987	1988
Vuelta a España	—	—	DNF	113
Giro d'Italia	—	—	—	—
Tour de France	DNF	—	—	—

Legend
—	Did not compete
DNF	Did not finish
