= Modesto Urrutibeazcoa =

Spanish cyclist

Personal information
- Born: 29 September 1959 (age 67) Ibarra, Spain

Cycling career
- Sport: Cycling
- Role: Rider

Modesto Urrutibeazcoa (born 29 September 1959) is a Spanish former professional racing cyclist. He rode in two editions of the Tour de France.
