= Fabio Bordonali =

Italian bicycle racer

Personal information
- Born: 25 December 1963 (age 62) Brescia, Italy

Cycling career
- Sport: Cycling
- Discipline: Road
- Role: Rider; Directeur sportif

Professional teams
- 1985–1988: Carrera–Inoxpran
- 1989: Malvor–Sidi
- 1990: Diana–Colnago–Animex
- 1991: Gis Gelati–Ballan
- 1992–1993: Mercatone Uno–Medeghini–Zucchini
- 1994: Brescialat–Ceramiche Refin

Managerial teams
- 1995–2001: Brescialat–Fago
- 2002: Cage Maglierie
- 2003–2007: Tenax
- 2008–2009: LPR Brakes–Ballan
- 2011–2015: De Rosa–Ceramica Flaminia

Fabio Bordonali (born 25 December 1963 in Brescia) is an Italian former road cyclist. Professional from 1985 to 1994, he most notably won the 1989 Vuelta a Andalucía. After retiring from cycling, he worked as a directeur sportif on several teams.

== Major results ==
1986
7th GP Industria & Artigianato di Larciano
1989
1st Overall Vuelta a Andalucía

1st Stage 1

1990
1st Overall Cronostaffetta
1991
2nd Overall Settimana Ciclistica Lombarda
10th Trofeo Laigueglia

=== Grand Tour general classification results timeline ===
Grand Tour	1986	1987	1988	1989	1990	1991	1992	1993	1994
Vuelta a España	—	—	64	96	DNF	—	87	77	DNF
Giro d'Italia	90	—	84	82	121	73	DNF	29	DNF
Tour de France	—	—	—	—	—	—	—	—	—

Legend
—	Did not compete
DNF	Did not finish
