= Willem Wijnant =

Belgian cyclist

Personal information
- Born: 16 July 1961 (age 65)

Cycling career
- Sport: Cycling
- Role: Rider

Willem Wijnant (born 16 July 1961) is a Belgian racing cyclist. He rode in the 1988 Tour de France.
