= Eddy Schepers =

Belgian cyclist

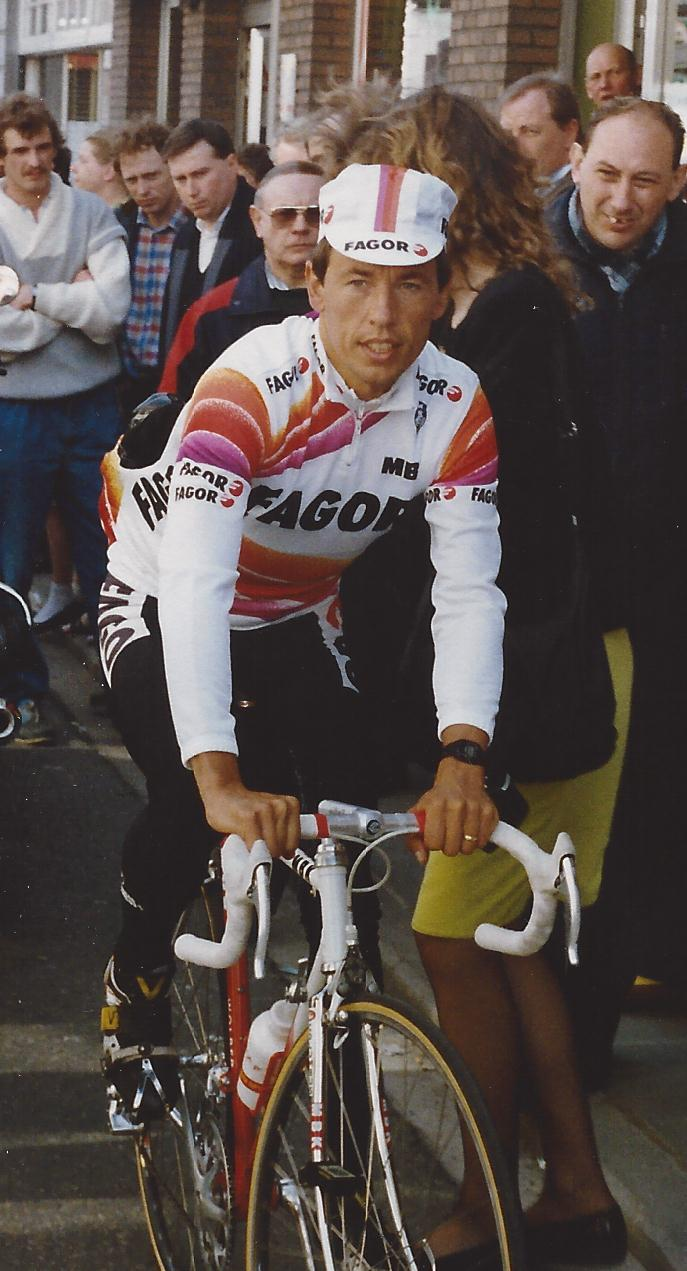
- Schepers, c. 1988-89

Personal information
- Born: 11 December 1955 (age 70) Tienen, Belgium

Cycling career
- Sport: Cycling
- Current team: Retired
- Discipline: Road
- Role: Rider

Professional teams
- 1978: C&A
- 1979–1981: DAF Trucks–Aida
- 1982: Gis Gelati
- 1983: Perlav–Eurosoap
- 1984: Dromedario
- 1985: Lotto
- 1986–1987: Carrera–Inoxpran
- 1988–1989: Fagor–MBK
- 1990: IOC–Tulip Computers

Eddy Schepers (born 12 December 1955) is a Belgian former professional cyclist. He was a professional cyclist from 1978 to 1990 where he rode for many teams including C&A, Carrera and Fagor–MBK. He started out in the C&A cycling team of Belgian Eddy Merckx before riding for various teams. He competed in the individual road race event at the 1976 Summer Olympics.

In 1986 he rode alongside Irish cyclist Stephen Roche for the first time in the Carrera cycling team and he became a loyal teammate of Roche that year. During the following year, Schepers was instrumental in Roche winning the 1987 Giro d'Italia and the Tour de France in supporting him on the road and also against the rest of the team who wanted the Italian Roberto Visentini to win the Giro d'Italia. On the fifth stage of the 1987 Giro d'Italia, Schepers let his breakaway companion Jean-Claude Bagot take the stage win in exchange for team support from Bagot's Fagor team if it was called upon in the future. In spite of working for Roche in the Giro d'Italia, Schepers still managed to place 12th in the general classification. Again in the 1987 edition of the Tour de France, Schepers provided Roche with crucial support while the rest of the team did not. Afterwards Schepers went with Roche to the Fagor team but with Roche past his peak due to chronic knee injury, their association stopped. Schepers spent his last year in the peloton riding for the Belgian team Tulip Computers.

His career victories include the overall of the Tour de l'Avenir stage race in 1977 and the first stage of the 1985 Tour de Romandie.

== Major results ==
1977
1st Overall Tour de l'Avenir
1st Overall Giro delle Regioni
1978
3rd Overall Tour de l'Aude
1979
2nd Road race, National Road Championships
3rd Brabantse Pijl
5th Liège–Bastogne–Liège
9th Overall GP du Midi-Libre
1980
3rd Road race, National Road Championships
10th Liège–Bastogne–Liège
1981
6th Züri-Metzgete
6th Liège–Bastogne–Liège
7th Rund um den Henninger Turm
8th La Flèche Wallonne
1983
4th La Flèche Wallonne
1985
1st Stage 1 Tour de Romandie
6th Overall Tour of Belgium
1986
8th Overall Critérium International
1987
1st Stage 3 (TTT) Giro d'Italia
4th Overall Critérium International
8th Liège–Bastogne–Liège
1988
9th Overall Vuelta a España

== Notes ==
The Agony and the Ecstasy: Stephen Roche's World of Cycling (Hardcover) by Stephen Roche (Author), David Walsh (Author) 1988
