= Anselmo Fuerte =

Spanish cyclist (born 1962)

Personal information
- Born: 27 January 1962 (age 64) Madrid, Spain

Cycling career
- Sport: Cycling
- Current team: Retired
- Discipline: Road
- Role: Rider

Professional teams
- 1985–1989: Zor–Gemeaz Cusin
- 1990–1992: ONCE
- 1993: Kelme–Xacobeo

Anselmo Fuerte Abelenda (born 27 January 1962 in Madrid) is a former Spanish racing cyclist. He finished third in the 1988 and 1990 Vuelta a España.

== Major results ==
1984
1st Overall Vuelta a la Comunidad de Madrid
1986
3rd Overall Vuelta a Burgos
4th Overall Tour of the Basque Country

1st Stage 4

4th Overall Volta Ciclista a Catalunya
5th Overall Route du Sud
9th Overall Vuelta a España
9th Overall Critérium International
1987
1st Overall Vuelta a Aragón
3rd Overall Vuelta a Asturias
7th Overall Vuelta a España
8th Overall Tour de France
1988
2nd Overall Setmana Catalana de Ciclisme
3rd Overall Vuelta a España
8th Overall Tour of the Basque Country
1990
3rd Overall Vuelta a España
1991
2nd Overall Setmana Catalana de Ciclisme
1992
6th Overall Vuelta a Andalucía
