= Jesús Blanco Villar =

Spanish cyclist

Personal information
- Born: 26 March 1963 (age 63) Rois, Spain

Cycling career
- Sport: Cycling
- Current team: Retired
- Discipline: Road
- Role: Rider

Professional teams
- 1982–1988: Teka
- 1989: Seur
- 1990–1991: Lotus–Festina
- 1992: Seur
- 1993–1994: Deportpublic
- 1995–1996: W52–Paredes Móvel
- 1997–1998: LA Alumínios–Pecol–A.C. Malveira

Major wins
- Grand Tours Vuelta a España 3 individual stages (1986, 1987)

Jesús Blanco Villar (born 26 March 1963) is a Spanish former professional racing cyclist. He rode in three editions of the Tour de France, one edition of the Giro d'Italia and ten editions of the Vuelta a España.

== Major results ==
1983
3rd Circuito de Getxo
5th Overall Vuelta a Andalucía
1984
1st Prologue Volta a Catalunya
3rd Overall Vuelta a los Valles Mineros
3rd Overall Vuelta a La Rioja
3rd Overall Vuelta a Andalucía
7th Trofeo Masferrer
1985
1st Overall Volta a la Comunitat Valenciana

1st Prologue & Stage 4

1st Overall Vuelta a Castilla y Leon

1st Stage 3

1st Overall Vuelta a Asturias

1st Stages 1a & 1b

1st Overall Tour of Galicia

1st Prologue & Stage 3

2nd Overall Vuelta a Murcia

1st Stage 2

3rd Overall Vuelta a La Rioja
3rd Overall Vuelta a Andalucía

1st Prologue

3rd Overall Vuelta a Cantabria
4th Overall Setmana Catalana de Ciclisme
7th Trofeo Masferrer
1986
1st Stages 5 & 19 Vuelta a España
1st Prologue Vuelta a Burgos
2nd Overall Volta a la Comunitat Valenciana
5th Overall Tour of the Basque Country
6th Overall Vuelta a Andalucía
9th Subida al Naranco
1987
1st Overall Vuelta a Cantabria

1st Stages 3 & 5a

1st Stage 18 (ITT) Vuelta a España
1st Stage 6 Vuelta a Castilla y Leon
1st Prologue Tour of Galicia
2nd Overall Vuelta a Andalucía

1st Prologue

2nd Overall Volta a la Comunitat Valenciana
6th Overall Tour of the Basque Country
6th Clásica de San Sebastián
1988
2nd Overall Vuelta a Andalucía
3rd Overall Volta a la Comunitat Valenciana
7th Overall Vuelta a España
7th Clásica de San Sebastián
8th Trofeo Masferrer
1989
3rd Overall Tour of the Basque Country
5th Subida al Naranco
7th Overall Vuelta a La Rioja
1991
1st Overall Volta ao Alentejo
3rd Paris–Camembert
1992
7th Overall Vuelta a Andalucía
1995
10th Overall Volta ao Algarve
1997
5th Overall Trofeu Joaquim Agostinho

=== Grand Tour general classification results timeline ===
Grand Tour	1983	1984	1985	1986	1987	1988	1989	1990	1991	1992	1993
Giro d'Italia	—	—	—	—	—	—	25	—	—	—	—
Tour de France	—	—	—	25	DNF	35	—	—	—	—	—
Vuelta a España	45	30	DNF	16	25	7	15	DNF	36	—	25

Legend
—	Did not compete
DNF	Did not finish
