= Roberto Córdoba =

Spanish cyclist (born 1962)

Personal information
- Full name: Roberto Córdoba Asensi
- Born: 4 December 1962 (age 63) Madrid, Spain

Cycling career
- Sport: Cycling
- Current team: Retired
- Discipline: Road
- Role: Rider

Professional teams
- 1985: Zor–Gemeaz Cusin
- 1986–1987: Dormilón
- 1987: Colchón CR
- 1988: BH
- 1989–1990: Teka
- 1991–1992: Wigarma–JM Catering

Roberto Córdoba Asensi (born 4 December 1962) is a Spanish former road cyclist, who competed as a professional from 1985 to 1992.

== Major results ==
1986
5th Barcelona–Andorra
8th Overall Vuelta a Murcia

1st Stage 5

8th Trofeo Masferrer
1987
1st Clásica a los Puertos de Guadarrama
1st Trofeo Masferrer
9th Overall Euskal Bizikleta
1988
10th Overall Vuelta a España

=== Grand Tour general classification results timeline ===
Grand Tour	1985	1986	1987	1988	1989	1990	1991	1992
Giro d'Italia	110	—	—	—	—	—	—	—
Tour de France	—	—	—	—	—	—	—	—
Vuelta a España	—	DNF	DNF	10	DNF	DNF	DNF	85
