= Jørgen V. Pedersen =

Danish cyclist (born 1959)

Jørgen Pedersen
Personal information
- Full name: Jørgen Vagn Pedersen
- Born: 8 October 1959 (age 67) Copenhagen, Denmark
- Height: 1.80 m (5 ft 11 in)
- Weight: 74 kg (163 lb)

Cycling career
- Sport: Cycling
- Current team: Retired
- Discipline: Road
- Role: Rider

Major wins
- One stage Tour de France

Jørgen Vagn Pedersen (born 8 October 1959) is a Danish retired road bicycle racer, and as of 2007 sports director at Team CSC.

He participated in Tour de France in 1985, 1986, and 1987 for the Carrera Jeans–Vagabond team. In 1988 he rode the tour for BH. In 1985 he won the 10th stage. In 1986 he rode, as the second Dane, five days in the yellow jersey. In 1986 he was second overall in the stage race Danmark Rundt.

He also competed at the 1980 Summer Olympics and the 1984 Summer Olympics.

== Major results ==
1981
Denmark national amateur road race champion
1985
Tour de France:

Winner stage 10

1986
Tour de France:

Wearing yellow jersey for five days

1988
Klasika Primavera
