= Titanbonifica–Benotto =

Cycling team (1983-1987)

Team information
- Registered: Italy
- Founded: 1986
- Disbanded: 1989
- Discipline: Road

Key personnel
- General manager: Riccardo Magrini
- Team managers: Marcello Perugi; Carlo Menicagli; Domenico Garbelli; Alfredo Lami; Roberto Poggiali

Team name history
- 1986–1987 1988 1989: Magniflex–Centroscarpa; Alba Cucine–Benotto–Sidermec; Titanbonifica–Benotto

Titanbonifica–Benotto, also known as Magniflex–Centroscarpa or Alba Cucine–Benotto, was an Italian professional cycling team that existed from 1986 to 1989.

The team competed in three consecutive editions of the Giro d'Italia and two editions of the Vuelta a España.

== Major wins ==
1987
Tre Valli Varesine, Franco Ballerini
1989
Giro dell'Umbria, Stefano Colagè
Giro di Romagna, Max Sciandri
