= Ángel Ocaña =

Spanish cyclist

Personal information
- Born: 7 June 1960 (age 66) Granada, Spain

Cycling career
- Sport: Cycling
- Role: Rider

Ángel Ocaña (born 7 June 1960) is a Spanish former professional racing cyclist. He rode in one edition of the Tour de France and five editions of the Vuelta a España.
