= Fagor (cycling team, 1985–1989) =

French professional cycling team (1985–1989)

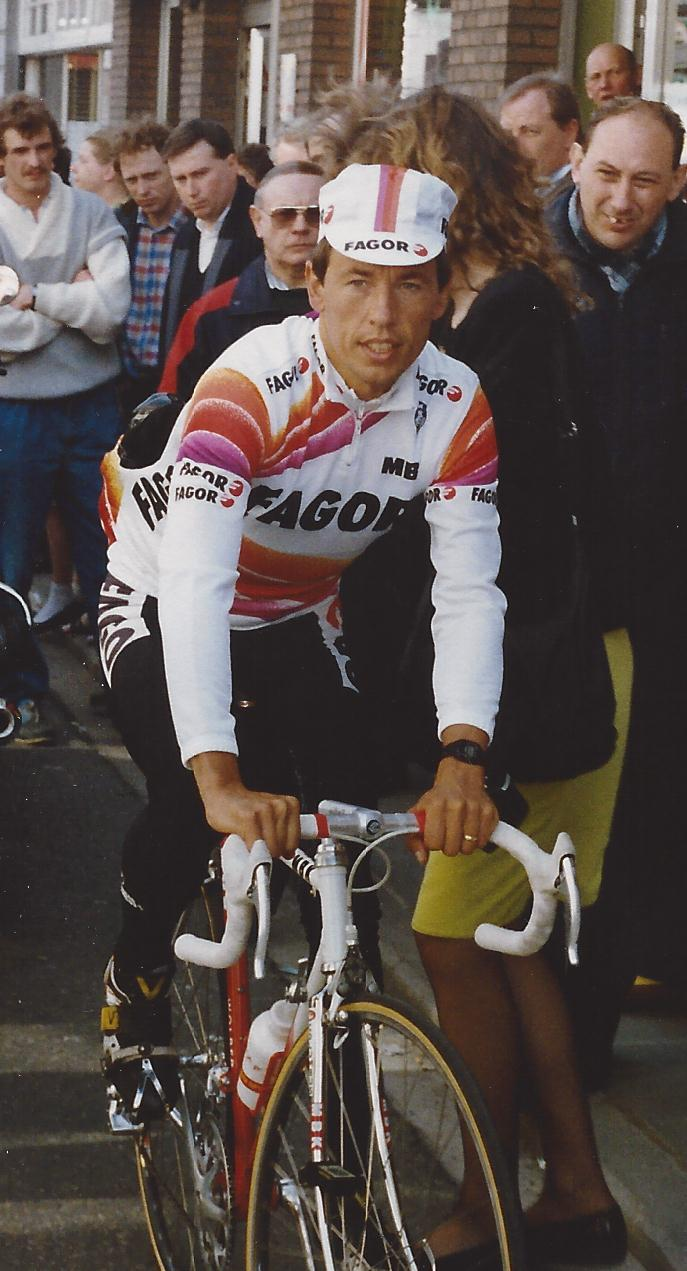
- Eddy Schepers c. 1988–1989

Team information
- Registered: France
- Founded: 1985
- Disbanded: 1989
- Discipline: Road

Team name history
- 1985–1986 1987–1989: Fagor; Fagor–MBK

Fagor was a French professional cycling team that existed from 1985 to 1989. Its main sponsor was Spanish domestic and commercial appliance manufacturer Fagor.
