= Vuelta a Cundinamarca =

Colombian multi-day road cycling race

Vuelta a Antioquia
Race details
- Date: June
- Region: Cundinamarca Department
- English name: Tour of Cundinamarca
- Discipline: Road
- Type: Stage race
- Organiser: Liga de ciclismo de Cundinamarca

History
- First edition: 1974
- Editions: 44 (as of 2023)
- First winner: Norberto Cáceres (COL)
- Most wins: José Patrocinio Jiménez (COL); Luis Alberto González (COL); (3 wins)
- Most recent: Rafael Pineda (COL)

The Vuelta a Cundinamarca is a road cycling race held annually in the Cundinamarca Department of Colombia.

The race was first held in 1974, when it was known as the Clásica de Cundinamarca. It was renamed the Vuelta a Cundinamarca in 1996.

A women's race, the Vuelta a Cundinamarca Femenina, was created in 2010.

== Winners ==
=== Men ===
Year	Winner	Second	Third
1974	(Colombia) Norberto Cáceres	(Colombia) Álvaro Gómez Bedoya	(Colombia) Julio Alberto Rubiano
1975	(Colombia) Julio Alberto Rubiano	(Colombia) Norberto Cáceres	(Colombia) Plinio Casas
1976	(Colombia) Norberto Cáceres	(Colombia) Victor Ladino	(Colombia) Filadelfo Camacho
1977	(Colombia) Julio Alberto Rubiano	(Colombia) Rafael Antonio Niño	(Colombia) José Alfonso López
1978	(Colombia) José Patrocinio Jiménez	(Colombia) Álvaro Pachón	(Colombia) Luis Enrique Murillo
1979-1980	No race
1981	(Colombia) José Patrocinio Jiménez	(Colombia) Heriberto Urán	(Colombia) Alfonso Flórez
1982	No race
1983	(Colombia) José Patrocinio Jiménez	(Colombia) Edgar Corredor	(Colombia) Ramón Tolosa
1984	(Colombia) Fabio Parra	(Colombia) Pacho Rodríguez	(Colombia) Martín Ramírez
1985	(Colombia) Fabio Parra (Note: Parra was announced as the winner after Pablo Wilches was stripped of the title for a soping violation.)	(Colombia) Samuel Cabrera	(Colombia) Carlos Mario Jaramillo
1986	(Colombia) Edgar Corredor	(Colombia) Heriberto Urán	(Colombia) Álvaro Lozano
1987	(Colombia) Reynel Montoya	(Colombia) Omar Hernández	(Colombia) Óscar de Jesús Vargas
1988	(Colombia) Luis Alberto González	(Colombia) Héctor Patarroyo	(Colombia) Pacho Rodríguez
1989	(Colombia) Pacho Rodríguez	(Colombia) Fabio Hernán Rodríguez	(Colombia) Augusto Triana
1990	(Colombia) Pacho Rodríguez	(Colombia) Luis Alberto González	(Colombia) Gustavo Wilches
1991	(Colombia) Néstor Mora	(Colombia) Ángel Yesid Camargo	(Colombia) Pablo Wilches
1992	(Colombia) Luis Alberto González	(Colombia) Alberto Camargo	(Colombia) Hernán Patiño
1993	(Colombia) Luis Alberto González	(Colombia) Álvaro Sierra	(Colombia) José Jaime González
1994	(Colombia) Efraín Rico	(Colombia) Álvaro Sierra	(Colombia) Héctor Castaño
1995	(Colombia) Javier de Jesús Zapata	(Colombia) Luis Alberto González	(Colombia) Libardo Niño
1996	(Colombia) Ángel Yesid Camargo	(Colombia) Jairo Hernández	(Colombia) Luis Espinosa
1997	(Colombia) Dubán Ramírez	(Colombia) Germán Ospina	(Colombia) Israel Ochoa
1998	(Colombia) Israel Ochoa	(Colombia) Álvaro Sierra	(Colombia) Iván Ramiro Parra
1999	(Colombia) Ángel Yesid Camargo	(Colombia) Libardo Niño	(Colombia) Raúl Montaña
2000	(Colombia) Uberlino Mesa	(Colombia) Israel Ochoa	(Colombia) Javier de Jesús Zapata
2001	(Colombia) Ismael Sarmiento	(Colombia) Daniel Rincón	(Colombia) Marlon Pérez
2002	(Colombia) Miguel Ángel Sanabria	(Colombia) Daniel Rincón	(Colombia) Johnny Ruiz
2003	(Colombia) Javier Alberto González	(Colombia) Javier de Jesús Zapata	(Colombia) Marlon Pérez
2004	(Colombia) Álvaro Sierra	(Colombia) Hernán Darío Muñoz	(Colombia) Walter Fernando Pedraza
2005	No race
2006	(Colombia) Diego Calderón	(Colombia) Alexis Castro	(Colombia) Wilson Marentes
2007	(Colombia) Daniel Rincón	(Colombia) Wilson Marentes	(Colombia) Rafael Aníbal Montiel
2008	(Colombia) Santiago Ojeda	(Colombia) Álvaro Sierra	(Colombia) John Martínez
2009	(Spain) Óscar Sevilla	(Colombia) Iván Ramiro Parra	(Colombia) Javier Alberto González
2010	(Colombia) ~~Libardo Niño~~ (Note: Niño was stripped of the title after a doping violation.)	(Colombia) Robinson Chalapud	(Colombia) Álvaro Yamid Gómez
2011	(Colombia) Freddy Montaña	(Colombia) Fernando Camargo	(Colombia) Víctor Niño
2012	(Colombia) Alejandro Ramírez	(Colombia) John Martínez	(Colombia) Rodolfo Torres
2013	(Colombia) Luis Alberto Largo	(Colombia) Fernando Camargo	(Colombia) José Salazar
2014	(Colombia) Freddy Montaña	(Colombia) Fernando Camargo	(Venezuela) José Rujano
2015	(Colombia) Óscar Mauricio Pachón	(Colombia) Rafael Infantino	(Colombia) Hernando Bohórquez
2016	(Colombia) Fabio Montenegro	(Colombia) Freddy Montaña	(Colombia) Óscar Javier Rivera
2017	(Colombia) Álvaro Yamid Gómez	(Colombia) Diego Calderón	(Colombia) Rubén Darío Acosta
2018	(Colombia) Wldy Sandoval	(Colombia) Miguel Ángel Reyes	(Colombia) Rubén Darío Acosta
2019	(Colombia) Fabio Duarte	(Colombia) Nicolás Paredes	(Colombia) Yerson Sánchez
2021	(Colombia) Marlon Garzón	(Colombia) Javier Jamaica	(Colombia) Yerzon Sánchez
2023	(Colombia) Rafael Pineda	(Colombia) Rodrigo Contreras	(Colombia) Jhonatan Chaves

=== Women ===
Year	Winner	Second	Third
2010	(Colombia) Lorena Colmenares	(Colombia) Flor Marina Delgadillo	(Colombia) Serika Gulumá
2011	(Colombia) Lorena Vargas	(Colombia) Ana Cristina Sanabria	(Colombia) Nury Torres
2012	(Colombia) Ana Cristina Sanabria	(Colombia) Laura Lozano	(Colombia) Lorena Vargas
2013	No race
2014	(Colombia) Leidy Natalia Muñoz	(Colombia) Laura Lozano	(Colombia) Lorena Beltrán
2015	(Colombia) Luz Adriana Tovar	(Colombia) Jeniffer Medellín	(Colombia) Ana Cristina Sanabria
2016	(Colombia) Liliana Moreno	(Colombia) Ana Cristina Sanabria	(Colombia) Estefanía Herrera
2017	(Colombia) Liliana Moreno	(Colombia) Ana Cristina Sanabria	(Colombia) Lorena Colmenares
2018	(Colombia) Yolanda Valderrama	(Colombia) Tatiana Ducuara	(Colombia) Laura Castillo
2019	(Venezuela) Lilibeth Chacón	(Colombia) Luz Adriana Tovar	(Colombia) Yelitza Hernández
