= Vuelta a Boyacá =

Annual cycling road race in Colombia

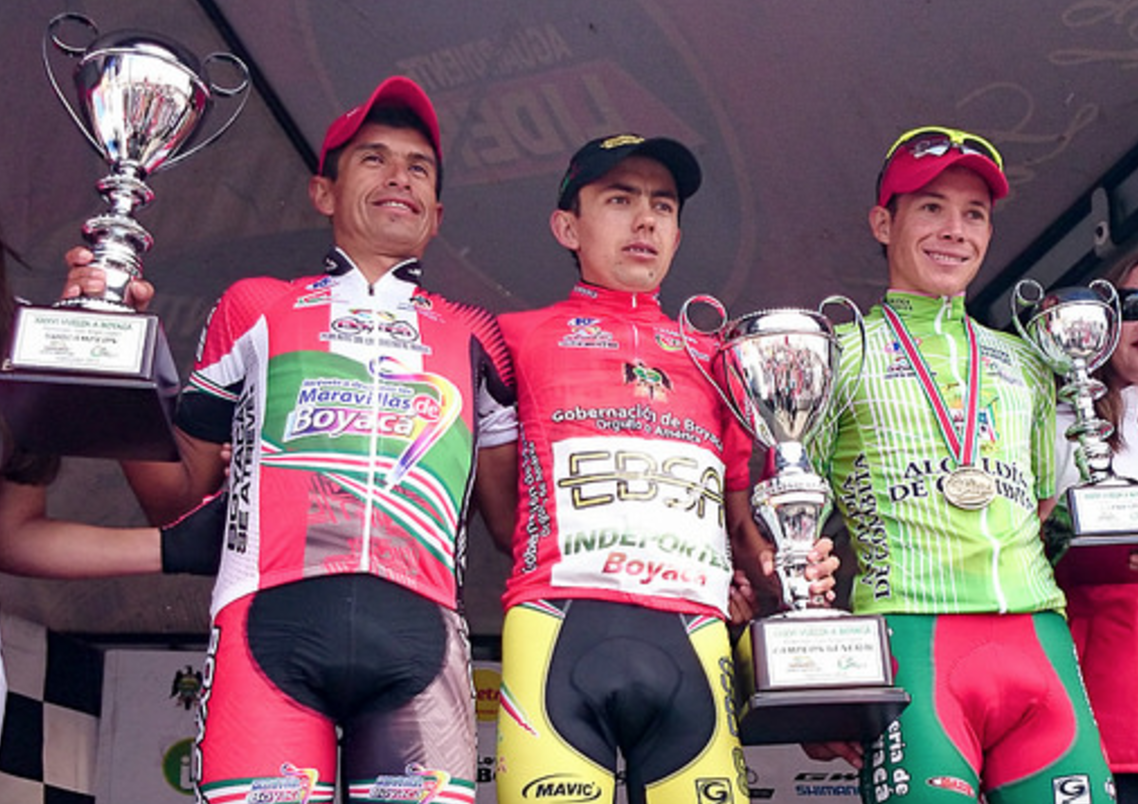
- Podium of the 2014 Vuelta a Boyacá

Race details
- Date: Varies
- Region: Boyacá Department
- English name: Tour of Boyacá
- Discipline: Road
- Type: Stage race
- Organiser: Boyacá Cycling League

History
- First edition: 1976
- Editions: 46 (as of 2025)
- First winner: Cristóbal Pérez (COL)
- Most wins: Álvaro Sierra (COL); Julio Alberto Rubiano (COL); Israel Ochoa (COL); Óscar Javier Rivera (COL); Rodrigo Contreras (COL); (3 wins)
- Most recent: Rodrigo Contreras (COL)

The Vuelta a Boyacá is a road cycling race held annually since 1976 in the Boyacá Department of Colombia. Prior to 1996, the race was known as the Clásica de Boyacá.

== Winners ==
=== Men ===
Year	Winner	Second	Third
1976	(Colombia) Cristóbal Pérez	(Colombia) Luis Gutiérrez	(Colombia) Efraín Pulido
1977	(Colombia) Manuel Ignacio León	(Colombia) Plinio Casas	(Colombia) Julio Alberto Rubiano
1978	(Colombia) Julio Alberto Rubiano	(Colombia) Luis Manrique	(Colombia) Manuel Ignacio Gutiérrez
1979	No race
1980	(Colombia) Julio Alberto Rubiano	(Colombia) José Patrocinio Jiménez	(Colombia) Fabio Navarro
1981	(Colombia) Julio Alberto Rubiano	(Colombia) Fabio Parra	(Colombia) Edgar Corredor
1982	No race
1983	(Colombia) Segundo Chaparro	(Colombia) Rafael Tolosa	(Colombia) Fabio Casas
1984	No race
1985	(Colombia) Omar Hernández	(Colombia) José Patrocinio Jiménez	(Colombia) Edgar Corredor
1986	(Colombia) Fabio Parra	(Colombia) Heriberto Urán	(Colombia) Gustavo Wilches
1987	(Colombia) Pablo Wilches	(Colombia) Reynel Montoya	(Colombia) Fabio Parra
1988	(Colombia) Néstor Mora	(Colombia) Pablo Wilches	(Colombia) Fabio Parra
1989	(Colombia) Luis Alberto González	(Colombia) Néstor Mora
1990	(Colombia) Pacho Rodríguez	(Colombia) Heriberto Urán
1991	(Colombia) Néstor Mora	(Colombia) Ángel Yesid Camargo	(Colombia) Federico Muñoz
1992	(Ecuador) Juan Carlos Rosero	(Colombia) Luis Alberto González	(Colombia) Hernán Buenahora
1993	(Colombia) Raúl Montaña	(Colombia) Álvaro Sierra	(Colombia) Libardo Niño
1994	(Colombia) Juan Diego Ramírez	(Colombia) Javier de Jesús Zapata
1995	(Colombia) Félix Cárdenas	(Colombia) Alberto Camargo
1996	(Colombia) Julio César Rangel	(Colombia) Juan Diego Ramírez	(Colombia) Ángel Yesid Camargo
1997	(Colombia) Israel Ochoa	(Colombia) Jair Bernal	(Colombia) Álvaro Sierra
1998	(Colombia) Álvaro Sierra	(Colombia) Ángel Yesid Camargo	(Colombia) Israel Ochoa
1999	(Colombia) Álvaro Sierra	(Colombia) Israel Ochoa	(Colombia) Félix Cárdenas
2000	(Colombia) Libardo Niño	(Colombia) Álvaro Sierra	(Colombia) Raúl Montaña
2001	(Colombia) Álvaro Sierra	(Colombia) Ángel Yesid Camargo	(Colombia) Libardo Niño
2002	(Colombia) Libardo Niño	(Colombia) Álvaro Sierra	(Colombia) Daniel Rincón
2003	(Colombia) Israel Ochoa	(Colombia) Félix Cárdenas	(Colombia) Javier de Jesús Zapata
2004	(Colombia) Víctor Niño	(Colombia) Ismael Sarmiento	(Colombia) Hernán Dario Bonilla
2005	(Colombia) Ismael Sarmiento	(Colombia) Graciano Fonseca	(Colombia) Israel Ochoa
2006	(Colombia) Israel Ochoa	(Colombia) Santiago Ojeda	(Colombia) Giovanny Báez
2007	(Colombia) Iván Casas	(Colombia) José Castelblanco	(Colombia) Uberlino Mesa
2008	(Colombia) Fernando Camargo	(Colombia) Víctor Niño	(Colombia) Uberlino Mesa
2009	(Colombia) Freddy Montaña	(Colombia) Javier Alberto González	(Colombia) Iván Parra
2010	(Colombia) Iván Casas	(Colombia) Mauricio Neiza	(Colombia) Álvaro Yamid Gómez
2011	(Colombia) Víctor Niño	(Colombia) Iván Parra	(Colombia) Fernando Camargo
2012	(Spain) Óscar Sevilla	(Colombia) Alex Cano	(Colombia) Luis Largo
2013	(Colombia) Jahir Pérez	(Colombia) Freddy Montaña	(Colombia) Camilo Gómez
2014	(Colombia) Óscar Javier Rivera	(Colombia) Fernando Camargo	(Colombia) Miguel Ángel López
2015	(Colombia) Javier Gómez	(Colombia) Robinson Chalapud	(Colombia) Omar Mendoza
2016	(Colombia) Óscar Javier Rivera	(Colombia) Alexis Camacho	(Colombia) Miguel Ángel López
2017	(Colombia) Óscar Javier Rivera	(Colombia) Rodrigo Contreras	(Colombia) Freddy Montaña
2018	(Colombia) Germán Chaves	(Colombia) Diego Ochoa	(Colombia) Óscar Javier Rivera
2019	(Colombia) Diego Camargo	(Colombia) Brandon Rivera	(Colombia) Marco Tulio Suesca
2020	No race
2021	(Colombia) Jeisson Casallas	(Colombia) Wilson Peña	(Colombia) Rubén Darío Acosta
2022	(Colombia) Rodrigo Contreras	(Colombia) Marco Tulio Suesca	(Colombia) Germán Chaves
2023	(Colombia) Rodrigo Contreras	(Colombia) Daniel Méndez	(Colombia) Marco Tulio Suesca
2024	(Colombia) Adrián Bustamante	(Colombia) Edgar Pinzón	(Colombia) Juan Carlos Lopez Moreno
2025	(Colombia) Rodrigo Contreras	(Colombia) Diego Camargo	(Colombia) Javier Jamaica

==== Repeat winners ====
Name	Wins	Years
(Colombia) Julio Alberto Rubiano	3	1978, 1980, 1981
(Colombia) Álvaro Sierra	3	1998, 1999, 2001
(Colombia) Israel Ochoa	3	1997, 2003, 2006
(Colombia) Óscar Javier Rivera	3	2014, 2016, 2017
(Colombia) Rodrigo Contreras	3	2022, 2023, 2025
(Colombia) Néstor Mora	2	1988, 1991
(Colombia) Libardo Niño	2	2000, 2002
(Colombia) Iván Casas	2	2007, 2010
(Colombia) Víctor Niño	2	2004, 2011

=== Women ===
Year	Winner	Second	Third
2014	(Colombia) Ana Milena Fagua	(Colombia) Lorena Colmenares	(Colombia) Jessenia Meneses
2015	(Colombia) Lorena Colmenares	(Colombia) Ana Cristina Sanabria	(Colombia) Ana Milena Fagua
2016	(Colombia) Ana Cristina Sanabria	(Colombia) Lorena Colmenares	(Colombia) Liliana Moreno
2017	(Colombia) Liliana Moreno	(Colombia) Lorena Colmenares	(Colombia) Jessica Parra
2018	(Colombia) Ana Cristina Sanabria	(Colombia) Jennyfer Ducuara	(Colombia) Serika Gulumá
2019	(Colombia) Ana Cristina Sanabria	(Colombia) Serika Gulumá	(Colombia) Jennifer Ducuara
2020	No race
2021	(Colombia) Camila Valbuena	(Colombia) Ana Cristina Sanabria	(Colombia) Milena Fagua
2022	(Colombia) Sara Juliana Moreno	(Colombia) Ana Cristina Sanabria	(Colombia) Estefanía Herrera
2023	(Colombia) Ana Cristina Sanabria	(Colombia) Sara Moreno	(Colombia) Estefanía Herrera
2024	(Colombia) Ana Cristina Sanabria	(Colombia) Laura Daniela Rojas	(Colombia) Paula Andrea Carrasco
2025	(Colombia) Laura Daniela Rojas	(Colombia) Sara Moreno	(Colombia) Juanita Salcedo
