= Wilches =

Wilches is a surname. Notable people with the surname include:

- Gustavo Wilches (born 1962), Colombian road cyclist
- Pablo Wilches (born 1955), Colombian road cyclist

== See also ==
- Puerto Wilches, town and municipality in the Santander Department of Colombia
