= Gustavo Wilches =

Colombian road cyclist (born 1962)

Personal information
- Full name: Gustavo Wilches Tumbia
- Born: 23 August 1962 (age 64) Facatativá, Colombia

Cycling career
- Sport: Cycling
- Discipline: Road
- Role: Rider

Professional teams
- 1987–1991: Postobón–Manzana
- 1992–1993: Gaseosas Glacial
- 1994: Jaisa–Banco popular–Philips

Major wins
- Vuelta a Colombia (1990); Clásico RCN (1990)

Gustavo Wilches Tumbia (born 23 August 1962) is a Colombian former road cyclist. He notably won the Vuelta a Colombia and the Clásico RCN in 1990. He also rode in the 1988 and 1990 Vuelta a España. His brothers Pablo, Ricardo and Marcos were also cyclists.

In 2001, Wilches was arrested and charged for attempting to smuggle 40 capsules of heroin through the El Dorado International Airport.

== Major results ==
1986
3rd Overall Vuelta a Boyacá
7th Overall Vuelta a Colombia

1st Stage 8

1987
3rd Overall Vuelta a Colombia
1990
1st Overall Vuelta a Colombia
1st Overall Clásico RCN

1st Stage 8

1st Overall Vuelta a Antioquia
3rd Overall Vuelta a Cundinamarca
1991
1st Stage 8 Clásico RCN
1993
1st Overall Vuelta a Chiriquí
