= Iván Casas =

Colombian cyclist (born 1980)

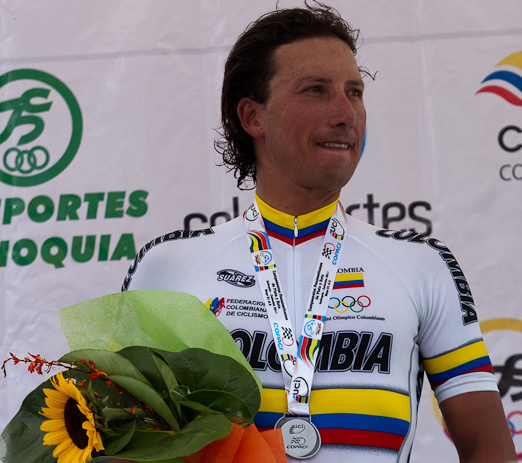
- Casas in 2011

Personal information
- Full name: Iván Mauricio Casas Buitrago
- Born: 12 June 1980 (age 46) Tunja, Boyacá, Colombia

Cycling career
- Sport: Cycling
- Current team: Retired
- Discipline: Road
- Role: Rider
- Rider type: Time trialist

Amateur teams
- 2004–2006: Lotería de Boyacá
- 2008: Lotería de Boyacá
- 2009: Orbea Racing Team América Colombia
- 2010: Boyacá es Para Vivirla–Orgullo de América
- 2010–2012: Formesán–Pinturas Bler
- 2012: EBSA–Indeportes Boyacá

Professional team
- 2007: Boyacá es Para Vivirla–Marche
Medal record
Men's road bicycle racing
Representing Colombia
Pan American Championships
Gold medal – first place	2010 Aguascalientes	Time trial
Silver medal – second place	2011 Medellín	Time trial

Iván Mauricio Casas Buitrago (born 12 June 1980) is a Colombian former professional racing cyclist.

== Major results ==
2005
2nd Overall Clásica de Girardot

1st Stage 4

2nd Overall Doble Copacabana GP Fides

1st Stage 3 (TTT)

2006
1st Stage 1 Doble Copacabana GP Fides
1st Stage 2 Clásica de Girardot
2nd Road race, National Road Championships
9th Overall Vuelta por un Chile Líder
2007
1st Overall Vuelta a Boyacà

1st Stages 3 & 5 (ITT)

1st Stage 3 Giro del Friuli-Venezia Giulia
2008
1st Overall Clásica de Fusagasugá

1st Stage 1

1st Stage 1 Vuelta a la Independencia Nacional
3rd Overall Vuelta al Tolima
2009
4th Road race, National Road Championships
2010
1st Time trial, Pan American Road Championships
1st Overall Vuelta a Boyacá
1st Stage 4 (ITT) Vuelta a Venezuela
1st Stage 1 (ITT) Vuelta a Chiapas
1st Stage 2 Clásico RCN
2011
1st Time trial, National Road Championships
1st Overall Vuelta al Uruguay

1st Stage 7a (ITT)

1st Overall Vuelta a Chiapas
Pan American Road Championships

2nd Time trial
7th Road race

7th Time trial, Pan American Games
2012
1st Time trial, National Road Championships
1st Stages 1 & 8 Vuelta a Chiriquí
1st Stage 1 Vuelta a Boyacá
5th Overall Vuelta al Uruguay
2013
2nd Time trial, National Road Championships
2nd Overall Vuelta al Valle del Cauca
