= Samuel Cabrera =

Colombian cyclist (1960–2022)

Personal information
- Full name: Samuel Cabrera Castañeda
- Born: 15 August 1960 Pacho, Colombia
- Died: 21 March 2022 (aged 61) Pacho, Colombia

Cycling career
- Sport: Cycling
- Discipline: Road
- Role: Rider

Amateur teams
- 1982: Aguardiente Superior
- 1983–1984: Colombia–Piles Varta

Professional teams
- 1985: Reynolds
- 1986–1987: Reynolds
- 1988–1989: Café de Colombia

Samuel Cabrera Castañeda (15 August 1960 – 21 March 2022) was a Colombian professional road cyclist.

Cabrera died on 21 March 2022, after being struck by lightning while working on his farm. He was 61.

== Major results ==
1980
1st overall Vuelta a Guatemala
1981
5th overall Vuelta a Colombia
7th overall Tour de l'Avenir
1982
1st overall Vuelta Ciclista a Costa Rica

1st stages 7 and 8

1st stage 7 Vuelta a Guatemala
3rd overall Clásico RCN
1983
5th overall Clásico RCN
6th overall Vuelta a Colombia
1985
2nd overall Vuelta a Cundinamarca
3rd overall Tour de l'Avenir

1st Mountains classification

1988
2nd overall Vuelta a Venezuela

1st stage 1

2nd overall Tour the Americas

1st stage 1

=== Grand Tour general classification results timeline ===
Grand Tour	1983	1984	1985	1986	1987	1988	1989
Giro d'Italia	—	—	—	—	—	—	21
Tour de France	57	32	—	11	DNF	31	49
Vuelta a España	—	—	DNF	35	44	DNF	—
