= Ángel Camargo =

Colombian cyclist

Personal information
- Full name: Ángel Yesid Camargo Ochoa
- Born: 22 May 1967 (age 59) Boyacá, Boyacá, Colombia

Cycling career
- Sport: Cycling
- Current team: Retired
- Discipline: Road
- Role: Rider

Amateur teams
- 1989–1990: Café de Colombia
- 1997: Gaseosas Glacial
- 1998–2001: Lotería de Boyacá

Professional teams
- 1992–1995: Kelme–Don Cafe
- 1996: Glacial–Selle Italia

Ángel Yesid Camargo Ochoa (born May 22, 1967) is a Colombian former road racing cyclist, who was a professional from 1992 to 1998. He rode in two editions each of the Tour de France, the Giro d'Italia and the Vuelta a España.

== Major results ==
1990
1st Stage 3 Vuelta a Colombia
1991
1st Overall Vuelta al Táchira
2nd Overall Vuelta a Boyacá
2nd Overall Vuelta a Cundinamarca
1992
1st Stage 2 Grand Prix du Midi Libre
1st Stage 4 Vuelta a Colombia
10th Clásica de Almería
1993
3rd Clásica a los Puertos
1994
1st Stage 10 Vuelta a España
4th Overall Setmana Catalana de Ciclisme
8th Overall Vuelta a Burgos
1996
3rd Overall Vuelta a Boyacá
1998
2nd Overall Vuelta a Boyacá
1999
1st Overall Clásica de Fusagasugá
1st Overall Vuelta a Cundinamarca
2001
2nd Overall Vuelta a Boyacá
