= Germán Chaves =

Colombian cyclist (1995–2023)

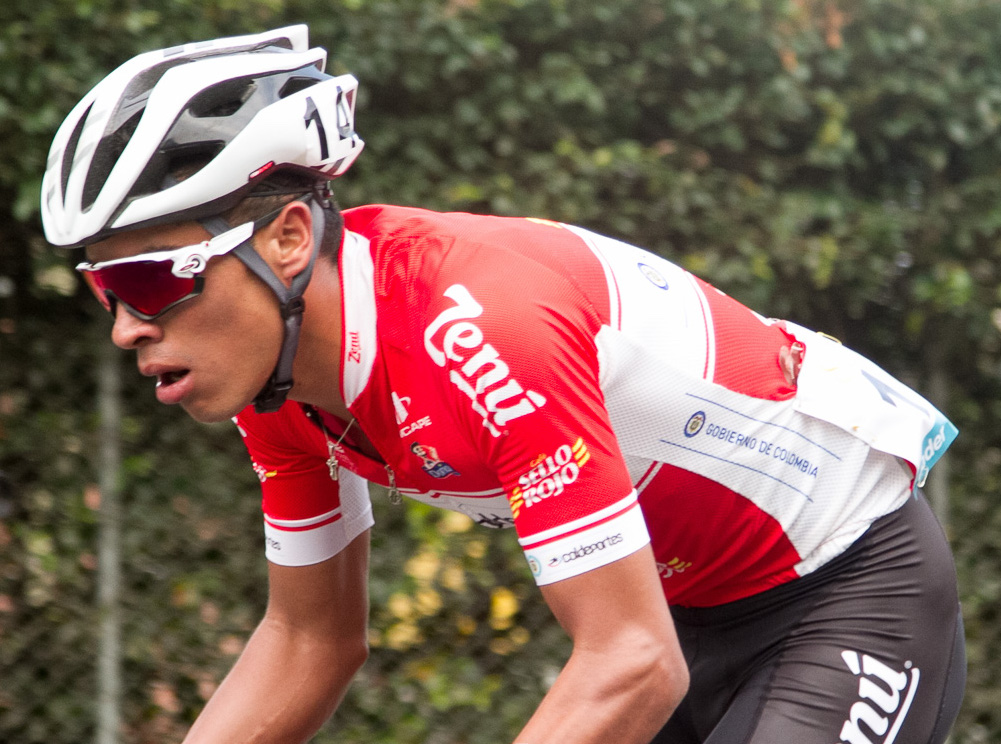
- Chaves in 2018

Personal information
- Full name: Germán Enrique Chaves Torres
- Born: 9 March 1995 Chocontá, Colombia
- Died: 4 June 2023 (aged 28) Chocontá, Colombia
- Height: 1.78 m (5 ft 10 in)
- Weight: 60 kg (132 lb)

Cycling career
- Sport: Cycling
- Discipline: Road
- Role: Rider

Amateur teams
- 2014–2016: Coldeportes–Zenú
- 2021–2022: EPM–Scott
- 2023: Team Sistecrédito–GW

Professional teams
- 2017–2019: Coldeportes–Zenú
- 2020: EPM–Scott

Germán Enrique Chaves Torres (9 March 1995 – 4 June 2023) was a Colombian professional cyclist. He last raced for Team Sistecredito–GW.

Chaves died on 4 June 2023, after being hit by a truck while he was training with his father in Cundinamarca. He was 28.

== Major results ==
2013
1st Stage 3 Vuelta del Porvenir
2014
3rd Overall Clásica de Rionegro
2017
2nd Overall Vuelta de la Juventud de Colombia

1st Stage 1

National Under-23 Road Championships

2nd Time trial
4th Road race

2018
1st Overall Vuelta a Boyacá
8th Overall Vuelta a la Comunidad de Madrid
2019
5th Overall Vuelta a Boyacá

1st Stage 1

2020
1st Overall Clásica de Cómbita

1st Stage 2

2021
1st Overall Clásica Nacional Marco Fidel Suárez

1st Stage 2

3rd Overall Vuelta al Tolima

1st Stage 4

5th Overall Vuelta a Boyacá

1st Prologue

2022
1st Stage 1 (TTT) Clásica de El Carmen de Viboral
3rd Overall Vuelta a Boyacá
3rd Overall Clásica de Fusagasugá

1st Mountains classification

4th Overall Vuelta a Antioquia

1st Stage 5

2023
1st Overall Clásica de Fusagasugá

1st Points classification
1st Mountains classification
1st Stage 1
