= Rubén Darío Acosta =

Colombian cyclist

Personal information
- Full name: Rubén Darío Acosta Ospina
- Born: 20 August 1996 (age 30)

Cycling career
- Sport: Cycling
- Current team: Astemo Utsunomiya Blitzen
- Discipline: Road
- Role: Rider

Amateur teams
- 2021: Strongman–Relojes G-Force
- 2022: JB–Calzado Power–Arroz Zulia
- 2022: EBSA–Indeportes Boyacá
- 2022–2023: Team Fundecom
- 2023: Teo Copajebal Totonicapán

Professional teams
- 2017–2018: Bicicletas Strongman
- 2019: Nippo–Vini Fantini–Faizanè
- 2020: Equipo Continental Supergiros
- 2024–: Utsunomiya Blitzen

Rubén Darío Acosta Ospina (born 20 August 1996) is a Colombian cyclist, who currently rides for UCI Continental team Astemo Utsunomiya Blitzen.

== Major results ==
2017
3rd Overall Vuelta a Cundinamarca
2018
1st Stage 2 Vuelta de la Juventud de Colombia
3rd Overall Vuelta a Cundinamarca
2021
3rd Overall Vuelta a Boyacá

2024
3rd Oita Urban Classic
8th Overall Tour de Taiwan
10th Overall Tour de Kumano

2025
6th Oita Urban Classic
