= José Patrocinio Jiménez =

Colombian cyclist (born 1953)

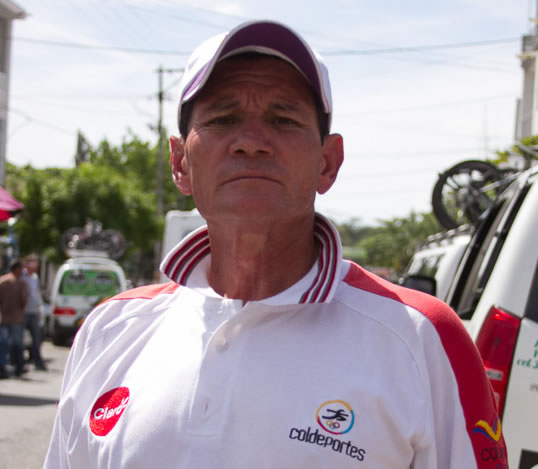
- José Patrocinio Jiménez in 2013

Personal information
- Full name: José Patrocinio Jiménez Bautista
- Born: 17 January 1953 (age 73) Ramiriquí, Colombia

Cycling career
- Sport: Cycling
- Discipline: Road
- Role: Rider
- Rider type: Climber

Amateur teams
- 1974–1975: Ministerio de Obras Públicas
- 1976: Banco Cafetero
- 1977: Ministerio de Obras Públicas
- 1978: Libreta de Plata
- 1979: Ministerio de Obras Públicas
- 1980–1981: Freskola
- 1982: Leche Sana
- 1983: Colombia–Pilas Varta

Professional teams
- 1984: Teka
- 1985–1988: Varta–Café de Colombia–Mavic

Major wins
- Stage races Coors Classic (1982) Vuelta a Colombia (1976) Clásico RCN (1976)

José Patrocinio Jiménez Bautista (born 17 January 1953) is a Colombian former professional racing cyclist. He rode in four editions of the Tour de France and three editions of the Vuelta a España.

== Major results ==
1974
3rd Road race, National Road Championships
6th Overall Vuelta a Venezuela
8th Overall Vuelta a Colombia

1st Young rider classification

1975
2nd Overall Vuelta a Colombia
1976
1st Overall Vuelta a Colombia

1st Mountains classification
1st Stage 9

1st Overall Clásico RCN

1st Stage 2

1st Overall Vuelta a Guatemala

1st Mountains classification
1st Points classification
1st Stages 2, 7, 8 & 12

1977
1st Overall Vuelta al Táchira

1st Stage 2

1st Overall Vuelta a Guatemala

1st Mountains classification
1st Stages 2, 4 & 8

2nd Overall Vuelta a Colombia
2nd Overall Clásico RCN
1978
1st Overall Vuelta a Cundinamarca

1st Points classification
1st Stage 2

2nd Overall Vuelta al Táchira

1st Mountains classification
1st Points classification
1st Stage 5

2nd Overall Vuelta Ciclista de Chile

1st Mountains classification

6th Overall Clásico RCN
1979
2nd Overall Clásico RCN

1st Mountains classification

2nd Overall Vuelta Ciclista de Chile

1st Stage 3

3rd Overall Vuelta a Colombia

1st Mountains classification
1st Stage 7

1980
1st Overall Vuelta a Antioquia

1st Mountains classification
1st Stage 1

2nd Overall Vuelta a Boyacá

1st Mountains classification
1st Stages 3 & 4

3rd Overall Vuelta a Colombia

1st Mountains classification

3rd Overall Coors Classic
6th Overall Tour de l'Avenir

1st Stage 7

7th Overall Clásico RCN

1st Mountains classification

1981
1st Overall Vuelta a Cundinamarca
2nd Overall GP Tell

1st Stages 6a & 6b

3rd Overall Tour de l'Avenir

1st Mountains classification
1st Stage 8

4th Overall Clásico RCN
5th Overall Vuelta a Colombia

1st Mountains classification
1st Stage 10

1982
1st Overall Coors Classic

1st Stages 3 & 6

1st Overall Vuelta a Antioquia
3rd Overall Vuelta Ciclista de Chile

1st Stage 2

4th Overall Clásico RCN

1st Stage 9

5th Overall Vuelta a Colombia
1983
1st Overall Vuelta a Cundinamarca
3rd Overall Vuelta a Colombia
4th Overall Clásico RCN
1984
2nd Subida al Naranco
6th Trofeo Masferrer
7th Overall Vuelta a España
8th Subida a Urkiola
9th Overall Volta a Catalunya
1985
6th Overall Escalada a Montjuïc
1986
1st Stage 4b Vuelta a Boyacá

=== Grand Tour general classification results timeline ===
Grand Tour	1983	1984	1985	1986	1987	1988
Giro d'Italia	—	—	—	—	—	—
Tour de France	17	15	—	21	—	51
Vuelta a España	—	7	—	32	16	—
