= Liliana Moreno =

Colombian cyclist

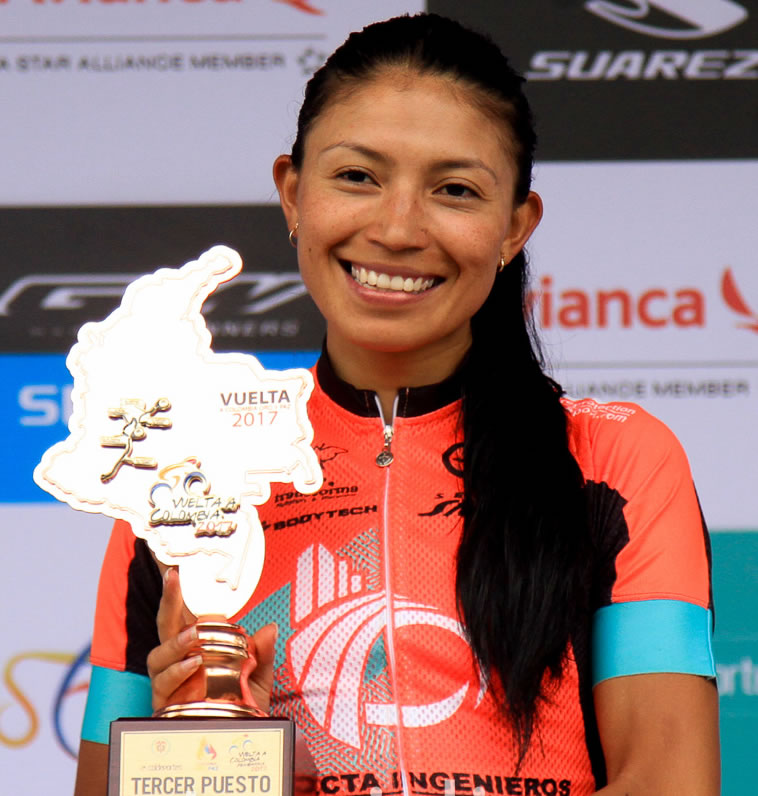
- Moreno in 2017

Personal information
- Full name: Blanca Liliana Moreno Canchon
- Born: 8 July 1992 (age 34)

Cycling career
- Sport: Cycling
- Discipline: Road
- Role: Rider

Amateur team
- 2017–2018: Proyecta Ingenieros Olmo

Professional team
- 2018–2020: Astana

Major wins
- National Road Race Championships (2019)

Blanca Liliana Moreno Canchon (born 8 July 1992) is a Colombian professional racing cyclist, who most recently rode for UCI Women's Continental Team Astana.

== Major results ==
2010
5th Overall Vuelta a Cundinamarca

2011
3rd Overall Vuelta Femenino del Porvenir
8th Time Trial, National Road Championships

2012
1st Overall Vuelta Femenino del Porvenir

1st Stage 2

1st Overall Clasica Ciudad de Soacha

1st Stage 3

7th Time Trial, National Road Championships

2013
1st Overall Vuelta Femenino del Porvenir

1st Prologue, Stages 2 & 3 (ITT)

2nd Overall Clasica Ciudad de Soacha
3rd Overall Clasica Ciudad de Bogota

1st Stage 2 (ITT)

2016
1st Overall Vuelta a Cundinamarca

1st Stage 2 (ITT)

2nd Overall Clasica Ciudad de Soacha
National Road Championships

2nd Road Race
9th Time Trial

3rd Overall Vuelta a Boyaca
3rd Overall Clasica IDRD Esteban Chaves (Bogota)

1st Stage 1

3rd Overall Vuelta Al Tolima
3rd Overall Clasica Alcaldia de Anapoima

1st Stage 2

4th Overall Vuelta a Colombia
4th Overall Vuelta Internacional Femenina a Costa Rica
9th Overall Vuelta Femenino del Porvenir

1st Stage 3

2017
1st Overall Clasica Ciudad de Soacha

1st Stage 3

1st Overall Clasica IDRD Esteban Chaves

1st Stage 1 (ITT) & 4

1st Overall Clasica 20 de Julio

1st Stage 1 (ITT)

1st Overall Vuelta a Boyaca

1st Stage 2 (ITT)

1st Overall Vuelta a Cundinamarca

1st Stage 2 (ITT)

2nd Overall Vuelta Internacional Femenina a Costa Rica

1st Stage 2 (ITT)

3rd Overall Vuelta a Colombia
3rd Overall Clasica Alcaldia de Anapoima
5th Time Trial, National Road Championships
7th Overall Vuelta Femenino del Porvenir

2018
1st Overall Vuelta Internacional Femenina a Costa Rica

1st Stage 2 (ITT)

1st Overall Clasica Nacional Ciudad de Anapoima

1st Stages 1 (ITT) & 2

2019
1st Road race, National Road Championships
1st Overall Vuelta Femenina a Guatemala
