= Julio Rubiano =

Colombian cyclist (1953–2019)

Personal information
- Full name: Julio Alberto Rubiano Pachón
- Born: 19 August 1953 Nemocón, Colombia
- Died: 8 January 2019 (aged 65) Bogotá, Colombia

Cycling career
- Sport: Cycling

Julio Alberto Rubiano Pachón (19 August 1953 – 8 January 2019) was a Colombian racing cyclist. He competed in the team time trial event at the 1976 Summer Olympics.

== Career ==
1974
1st in General Classification Vuelta a Colombia Sub-23 (COL)
2nd in Pan American Championships, Road, TTT, Cali (COL)
1978
2nd in General Classification Clásico RCN (COL)
1979
1st in Colombia National Championships, Road, Amateur, (COL)
2nd in General Classification Vuelta a Colombia (COL)
1981
2nd in General Classification Vuelta a Colombia (COL)
3rd in General Classification Clásico RCN (COL)
1982
1st in General Classification Vuelta Ciclista de Chile (CHI)
1984
3rd in Pan American Championship, Medellín (COL)
