= Heriberto Urán =

Colombian cyclist

Personal information
- Born: 20 August 1954 Urrao, Colombia
- Died: 1 January 2001 (aged 46)

Cycling career
- Sport: Cycling
- Role: Rider

Heriberto Urán (20 August 1954 – 1 January 2001) was a Colombian professional racing cyclist. He rode in the 1986 Tour de France.
