= Pablo Wilches =

Colombian cyclist

Personal information
- Full name: Pablo Emilio Wilches Tumbia
- Born: 13 July 1955 (age 71) Fusagasugá, Colombia

Cycling career
- Sport: Cycling
- Discipline: Road
- Role: Rider

Amateur teams
- 1983: Ahorros Banco de Colombia
- 1984: Leche La Gran Vía

Professional teams
- 1984: Splendor–Mondial Moquettes–Marc
- 1985: Varta–Café de Colombia–Mavic
- 1986–1989: Postobón–Manzana
- 1990–1991: Pony Malta
- 1992–1993: Gaseosas Glacial

Major wins
- Vuelta a Colombia (1987)

Pablo Wilches (born 13 July 1955) is a Colombian former professional racing cyclist. He rode in three editions of the Tour de France, one edition of the Giro d'Italia and five editions of the Vuelta a España. In the 1987 Tour de France, Wilches was in 7th overall going into stage 20, but was unable to finish. He also won the Vuelta a Colombia the same year.

== Major results ==
1982
1st Stage 10 Vuelta a Colombia
1984
6th Overall Vuelta a Colombia
1985
5th Overall Critérium du Dauphiné Libéré
1986
1st Stage 11 Vuelta a Colombia
1987
1st Overall Vuelta a Colombia

1st Stage 4 (ITT)

2nd Overall Clásico RCN

1st Stages 6 & 8 (ITT)

1988
1st Stage 9 Coors Classic
3rd Overall Vuelta a Colombia

1st Stage 7

3rd Overall Clásico RCN

1st Stage 1

1989
3rd Overall Clásico RCN

1st Stage 6

4th Overall Vuelta a Colombia

1st Stage 10

1991
1st Stages 2 & 11 Vuelta a Colombia
1st Prologue & Stages 4 (ITT) & 9 Clásico RCN

=== Grand Tour general classification results timeline ===
Grand Tour	1984	1985	1986	1987	1988	1989	1990	1991
Giro d'Italia	—	—	—	—	—	—	—	DNF
Tour de France	DNF	DNF	—	DNF	—	—	—	—
Vuelta a España	—	39	29	24	—	33	24	—
