= List of teams and cyclists in the 1990 Vuelta a España =

For the 1990 Vuelta a España, the field consisted of 198 riders; 133 finished the race.

== By rider ==
Legend
No.	Starting number worn by the rider during the Vuelta
Pos.	Position in the general classification
DNF	Denotes a rider who did not finish

No.	Name	Nationality	Team	Pos.	Ref
1	Pedro Delgado	Spain	Banesto	2	
2	Marino Alonso	Spain	Banesto	75	
3	Miguel Induráin	Spain	Banesto	7	
4	Julián Gorospe	Spain	Banesto	21	
5	Luis Javier Lukin	Spain	Banesto	49	
6	Juan Martínez Oliver	Spain	Banesto	88	
7	Jokin Mújika	Spain	Banesto	62	
8	Jesús Rodríguez Magro	Spain	Banesto	29	
9	Abelardo Rondón	Colombia	Banesto	46	
11	Djamolidine Abdoujaparov	Soviet Union	Alfa Lum	DNF	
12	Oleg Iarochenko	Soviet Union	Alfa Lum	DNF	
13	Ivan Ivanov	Soviet Union	Alfa Lum	8	
14	Vasily Zhdanov	Soviet Union	Alfa Lum	DNF	
15	Viktor Klimov	Soviet Union	Alfa Lum	DNF	
16	Vladimir Poulnikov	Soviet Union	Alfa Lum	DNF	
17	Asiat Saitov	Soviet Union	Alfa Lum	129	
18	Andrei Tchmil	Soviet Union	Alfa Lum	106	
19	Nikolai Golovatenko	Soviet Union	Alfa Lum	50	
21	Francisco Antequera	Spain	BH–Amaya	DNF	
22	Jesús Montoya	Spain	BH–Amaya	18	
23	Juan Carlos Arribas	Spain	BH–Amaya	108	
24	Jacques Decrion	France	BH–Amaya	DNF	
25	Patrice Esnault	France	BH–Amaya	DNF	
26	Alfonso Gutiérrez	Spain	BH–Amaya	86	
27	Javier Murguialday	Spain	BH–Amaya	27	
28	Joël Pelier	France	BH–Amaya	DNF	
29	Fernando Quevedo	Spain	BH–Amaya	44	
31	Juan Carlos Arias Acosta	Colombia	Café de Colombia	DNF	
32	Julio César Cadena	Colombia	Café de Colombia	DNF	
33	Alberto Camargo	Colombia	Café de Colombia	22	
34	Henry Cárdenas	Colombia	Café de Colombia	32	
35	Robert Forest	France	Café de Colombia	102	
36	Luis Herrera	Colombia	Café de Colombia	12	
37	Jørgen V. Pedersen	Denmark	Café de Colombia	67	
38	Álvaro Sierra	Colombia	Café de Colombia	19	
39	Jesper Worre	Denmark	Café de Colombia	51	
41	Javier Duch	Spain	CLAS–Cajastur	98	
42	Guillermo Arenas	Spain	CLAS–Cajastur	DNF	
43	Ángel Camarillo	Spain	CLAS–Cajastur	63	
44	Federico Echave	Spain	CLAS–Cajastur	6	
45	Iñaki Gastón	Spain	CLAS–Cajastur	14	
46	Francisco Javier Mauleón	Spain	CLAS–Cajastur	47	
47	Casimiro Moreda	Spain	CLAS–Cajastur	97	
48	José Manuel Oliveira	Spain	CLAS–Cajastur	74	
49	Gonzalo Aguiar	Spain	CLAS–Cajastur	128	
51	Mario Kummer	East Germany	Chateau d'Ax	92	
52	Luigi Botteon	Italy	Chateau d'Ax	DNF	
53	Giuseppe Calcaterra	Italy	Chateau d'Ax	DNF	
54	Camillo Passera	Italy	Chateau d'Ax	91	
55	Tony Rominger	Switzerland	Chateau d'Ax	16	
56	Mario Scirea	Italy	Chateau d'Ax	117	
57	Valerio Tebaldi	Italy	Chateau d'Ax	DNF	
58	Ennio Vanotti	Italy	Chateau d'Ax	76	
59	Franco Vona	Italy	Chateau d'Ax	DNF	
61	Davide Bramati	Italy	Diana–Colnago–Animex	DNF	
62	Fabrizio Bontempi	Italy	Diana–Colnago–Animex	DNF	
63	Fabio Bordonali	Italy	Diana–Colnago–Animex	DNF	
64	Zenon Jaskuła	Poland	Diana–Colnago–Animex	DNF	
65	Marek Kulas	Poland	Diana–Colnago–Animex	DNF	
66	Lech Piasecki	Poland	Diana–Colnago–Animex	DNF	
67	Maurizio Piovani	Italy	Diana–Colnago–Animex	DNF	
68	Giuseppe Saronni	Italy	Diana–Colnago–Animex	DNF	
69	Marek Szerszyński	Poland	Diana–Colnago–Animex	DNF	
71	Claudio Brandini	Italy	Jolly Componibili–Club 88	79	
72	Stefano Cecini	Italy	Jolly Componibili–Club 88	DNF	
73	Stefano Giuliani	Italy	Jolly Componibili–Club 88	132	
74	Bruno Leali	Italy	Jolly Componibili–Club 88	DNF	
75	Silvio Martinello	Italy	Jolly Componibili–Club 88	DNF	
76	Ettore Pastorelli	Italy	Jolly Componibili–Club 88	DNF	
77	Maurizio Rossi	Italy	Jolly Componibili–Club 88	87	
78	Francesco Rossignoli	Italy	Jolly Componibili–Club 88	DNF	
79	Roberto Visentini	Italy	Jolly Componibili–Club 88	DNF	
81	José Martín Farfán	Colombia	Kelme–Ibexpress	11	
82	Ricardo Martinez	Spain	Kelme–Ibexpress	DNF	
83	Néstor Mora	Colombia	Kelme–Ibexpress	42	
84	Pedro Saúl Morales	Colombia	Kelme–Ibexpress	30	
85	Fabio Parra	Colombia	Kelme–Ibexpress	5	
86	Francisco Cabello	Spain	Kelme–Ibexpress	118	
87	Juan Reina	Spain	Kelme–Ibexpress	107	
88	Ramon Rota	Spain	Kelme–Ibexpress	115	
89	Ángel Sarrapio	Spain	Kelme–Ibexpress	94	
91	Enrique Alonso	Spain	Lotus	61	
92	Jesús Blanco Villar	Spain	Lotus	DNF	
93	Manuel Carrera	Spain	Lotus	109	
94	Carlos Hernández Bailo	Spain	Lotus	31	
95	José Luis Laguía	Spain	Lotus	23	
96	Ángel Ocaña	Spain	Lotus	DNF	
97	Luis Pérez García	Spain	Lotus	54	
98	Luc Suykerbuyk	Netherlands	Lotus	64	
99	Roberto Torres	Spain	Lotus	72	
101	Emilio Cuadrado	Spain	Puertas Mavisa	131	
102	Manuel Delgado de Andrés	Spain	Puertas Mavisa	133	
103	Antonio Esparza	Spain	Puertas Mavisa	111	
104	Manuel Guijarro Doménech	Spain	Puertas Mavisa	73	
105	Miguel Ángel Iglesias	Spain	Puertas Mavisa	96	
106	Rafael Lorenzana	Spain	Puertas Mavisa	DNF	
107	Fernando Martínez de Guereñu Ochoa	Spain	Puertas Mavisa	52	
108	José Luis Morán	Spain	Puertas Mavisa	81	
109	Jesús Rodríguez Rodríguez	Spain	Puertas Mavisa	DNF	
111	Eduardo Chozas	Spain	ONCE	33	
112	Anselmo Fuerte	Spain	ONCE	3	
113	Santos Hernández	Spain	ONCE	38	
114	Marino Lejarreta	Spain	ONCE	55	
115	Miguel Ángel Martínez	Spain	ONCE	DNF	
116	Melcior Mauri	Spain	ONCE	71	
117	Pedro Muñoz Machín Rodríguez	Spain	ONCE	DNF	
118	Pello Ruiz Cabestany	Spain	ONCE	4	
119	Johnny Weltz	Denmark	ONCE	28	
121	Uwe Ampler	East Germany	PDM	9	
122	Dirk De Wolf	Belgium	PDM	DNF	
123	Peter Hoondert	Netherlands	PDM	126	
124	Gert Jakobs	Netherlands	PDM	114	
125	Atle Pedersen	Norway	PDM	89	
126	Uwe Raab	East Germany	PDM	58	
127	John van den Akker	Netherlands	PDM	110	
128	John Vos	Netherlands	PDM	127	
129	Gerhard Zadrobilek	Austria	PDM	84	
131	Marco Antonio Carreño	Colombia	Pony Malta	125	
132	Demetrio Cuspoca	Colombia	Pony Malta	34	
133	Luis Alberto González	Colombia	Pony Malta	DNF	
134	Álvaro Lozano	Colombia	Pony Malta	60	
135	Martín Ramírez	Colombia	Pony Malta	45	
136	Fabio Rodríguez	Colombia	Pony Malta	DNF	
137	Francisco Rodríguez Maldonado	Colombia	Pony Malta	15	
138	Celio Roncancio	Colombia	Pony Malta	DNF	
139	Pablo Wilches	Colombia	Pony Malta	24	
141	Arsenio Chaparro Cardoso	Colombia	Ryalco-Postobón	41	
142	Omar Hernández	Colombia	Ryalco-Postobón	56	
143	Carlos Jaramillo	Colombia	Ryalco-Postobón	13	
144	Álvaro Mejía	Colombia	Ryalco-Postobón	17	
145	Gerardo Moncada	Colombia	Ryalco-Postobón	25	
146	William Palacio	Colombia	Ryalco-Postobón	39	
147	Hector Patarroyo	Colombia	Ryalco-Postobón	DNF	
148	Gustavo Wilches	Colombia	Ryalco-Postobón	DNF	
149	Óscar Vargas	Colombia	Ryalco-Postobón	DNF	
151	Marco Giovannetti	Italy	Seur	1	
152	Mathieu Hermans	Netherlands	Seur	DNF	
153	Jean-Pierre Heynderickx	Belgium	Seur	DNF	
154	Joaquín Hernández Hernández	Spain	Seur	57	
155	Pablo Moreno	Spain	Seur	DNF	
156	José Luis Navarro	Spain	Seur	99	
157	Álvaro Pino	Spain	Seur	DNF	
158	José Salvador Sanchis	Spain	Seur	DNF	
159	Jon Unzaga	Spain	Seur	20	
161	Manuel Luis Abreu Campos	Portugal	Sicasal	113	
162	Jose Poeira	Portugal	Sicasal	103	
163	Cássio Freitas	Brazil	Sicasal	95	
164	Joaquim Gomes	Portugal	Sicasal	DNF	
165	Fernando Mota	Portugal	Sicasal	123	
166	Antonio Joaquim Pinto	Portugal	Sicasal	93	
167	Jorge-Manuel Silva	Portugal	Sicasal	100	
168	Serafim Vieira	Portugal	Sicasal	77	
169	Rui Vitorino	Portugal	Sicasal	DNF	
171	Udo Bölts	West Germany	Stuttgart	53	
172	Hartmut Bölts	West Germany	Stuttgart	DNF	
173	Bernd Gröne	West Germany	Stuttgart	121	
174	Josef Holzmann	West Germany	Stuttgart	78	
175	Darius Kaiser	Poland	Stuttgart	26	
176	Erwin Nijboer	Netherlands	Stuttgart	119	
177	Ad Wijnands	Netherlands	Stuttgart	122	
178	Dean Woods	Australia	Stuttgart	124	
179	Marcel Arntz	Netherlands	Stuttgart	DNF	
181	Enrique Aja	Spain	Teka	40	
182	Roberto Córdoba	Spain	Teka	DNF	
183	Malcolm Elliott	United Kingdom	Teka	116	
184	Nico Emonds	Belgium	Teka	35	
185	Peter Hilse	West Germany	Teka	66	
186	Jaanus Kuum	Norway	Teka	DNF	
187	Alberto Leanizbarrutia	Spain	Teka	69	
188	José Fernando Pacheco Sáez	Spain	Teka	120	
189	Mariano Sánchez Martinez	Spain	Teka	36	
191	Jean-François Bernard	France	Toshiba	59	
192	Thierry Bourguignon	France	Toshiba	37	
193	John Carlsen	Denmark	Toshiba	DNF	
194	Laurent Jalabert	France	Toshiba	70	
195	Pascal Lance	France	Toshiba	68	
196	Philippe Louviot	France	Toshiba	48	
197	Yvon Madiot	France	Toshiba	43	
198	Denis Roux	France	Toshiba	10	
199	Claude Séguy	France	Toshiba	90	
201	Eddy Schepers	Belgium	Tulip Computers	85	
202	Antonio Balboa Rico	Spain	Tulip Computers	DNF	
203	Manuel Jorge Domínguez	Spain	Tulip Computers	105	
204	Jaime Vilamajó	Spain	Tulip Computers	DNF	
205	Jesús Hernández Úbeda	Spain	Tulip Computers	DNF	
206	Daniele Caroli	Italy	Tulip Computers	101	
207	Vicente Prado Huergo	Spain	Tulip Computers	DNF	
208	José Andrès Ripoll	Spain	Tulip Computers	80	
209	Joaquim Llach Ramisa	Spain	Tulip Computers	65	
211	Edwin Bafcop	Belgium	Isoglass	DNF	
212	Stefan De Beleyr	Belgium	Isoglass	DNF	
213	Patrick Roelandt	Belgium	Isoglass	130	
214	Patrick Hendrickx	Belgium	Isoglass	82	
215	Stefan Rakers	Netherlands	Isoglass	DNF	
216	Rudy Rogiers	Belgium	Isoglass	104	
217	Benny Van Brabant	Belgium	Isoglass	83	
218	Frank Van Himst	Belgium	Isoglass	DNF	
219	Peter Verbeken	Belgium	Isoglass	112	
