= 1990 Vuelta a España, Stage 1 to Stage 11 =

Cycling race stages

The 1990 Vuelta a España was the 45th edition of the Vuelta a España, one of cycling's Grand Tours. The Vuelta began in Benicàssim, with an individual time trial on 24 April, and Stage 11 occurred on 4 May with a stage to San Isidro. The race finished in Madrid on 15 May.

== Stage 1 ==
24 April 1990 — Benicàssim to Benicàssim, 11.5 km (7.1 mi) (ITT)

Stage 1 result and general classification after Stage 1

| Rank | Rider | Team | Time |
|---|---|---|---|
| 1 | Pello Ruiz Cabestany (ESP) | ONCE | 13' 22" |
| 2 | Anselmo Fuerte (ESP) | ONCE | s.t. |
| 3 | Melcior Mauri (ESP) | ONCE | s.t. |
| 4 | Nico Emonds (BEL) | Teka | + 12" |
| 5 | Jaanus Kuum (NOR) | Teka | s.t. |
| 6 | Malcolm Elliott (GBR) | Teka | s.t. |
| 7 | Zenon Jaskuła (POL) | Diana–Colnago–Animex | + 13" |
| 8 | Giuseppe Saronni (ITA) | Diana–Colnago–Animex | s.t. |
| 9 | Miguel Induráin (ESP) | Banesto | + 15" |
| 10 | Julián Gorospe (ESP) | Banesto | s.t. |

== Stage 2a ==
25 April 1990 — Oropesa to Castellón, 108 km (67 mi)

Stage 2a result

| Rank | Rider | Team | Time |
|---|---|---|---|
| 1 | Emilio Cuadrado (ESP) | Puertas Mavisa | 2h 34' 04" |
| 2 | Marek Kulas (POL) | Diana–Colnago–Animex | s.t. |
| 3 | Viktor Klimov (URS) | Alfa Lum | s.t. |
| 4 | Stefano Cecini (ITA) | Jolly Componibili–Club 88 | s.t. |
| 5 | Uwe Raab (DDR) | PDM–Concorde–Ultima | + 8' 06" |
| 6 | Jean-Pierre Heynderickx (BEL) | Seur | s.t. |
| 7 | Ad Wijnands (NED) | Stuttgart–Mercedes–Merckx–Puma | s.t. |
| 8 | Laurent Jalabert (FRA) | Toshiba | s.t. |
| 9 | Asiat Saitov (URS) | Alfa Lum | s.t. |
| 10 | Giuseppe Calcaterra (ITA) | Chateau d'Ax–Salotti | s.t. |

General classification after Stage 2a

| Rank | Rider | Team | Time |
|---|---|---|---|
| 1 | Viktor Klimov (URS) | Alfa Lum | 2h 47' 41" |
| 2 | Stefano Cecini (ITA) | Jolly Componibili–Club 88 | + 16" |
| 3 | Marek Kulas (POL) | Diana–Colnago–Animex | + 17" |

== Stage 2b ==
25 April 1990 — Benicàssim to Borriana, 36.3 km (22.6 mi) (TTT)

Stage 2b result

| Rank | Team | Time |
|---|---|---|
| 1 | Lotus–Festina | 42' 43" |
| 2 | CLAS–Cajastur | + 3" |
| 3 | Seur | + 3" |
| 4 | ONCE | + 8" |
| 5 | Teka | + 17" |
| 6 | PDM–Concorde–Ultima | + 23" |
| 7 | Toshiba | + 25" |
| 8 | Kelme–Ibexpress | + 34" |
| 9 | Alfa Lum | + 34" |
| 10 | Café de Colombia | + 41" |

General classification after Stage 2b

| Rank | Rider | Team | Time |
|---|---|---|---|
| 1 | Viktor Klimov (URS) | Alfa Lum | 3h 30' 58" |
| 2 | Marek Kulas (POL) | Diana–Colnago–Animex | + 24" |
| 3 | Emilio Cuadrado (ESP) | Puertas Mavisa | + 1' 17" |
| 4 | Stefano Cecini (ITA) | Jolly Componibili–Club 88 | + 1' 26" |
| 5 | Pello Ruiz Cabestany (ESP) | ONCE | + 7' 05" |
| 6 | Anselmo Fuerte (ESP) | ONCE | s.t. |
| 7 | Melcior Mauri (ESP) | ONCE | s.t. |
| 8 | Johnny Weltz (DEN) | ONCE | + 7' 22" |
| 9 | Marino Lejarreta (ESP) | ONCE | s.t. |
| 10 | Malcolm Elliott (GBR) | Teka | + 7' 26" |

== Stage 3 ==
26 April 1990 — Dénia to Murcia, 204.3 km (126.9 mi)

Stage 3 result

| Rank | Rider | Team | Time |
|---|---|---|---|
| 1 | Nico Emonds (BEL) | Teka | 4h 29' 24" |
| 2 | Silvio Martinello (ITA) | Jolly Componibili–Club 88 | s.t. |
| 3 | Uwe Raab (DDR) | PDM–Concorde–Ultima | s.t. |
| 4 | Casimiro Moreda (ESP) | CLAS–Cajastur | s.t. |
| 5 | Ettore Pastorelli (ITA) | Jolly Componibili–Club 88 | s.t. |
| 6 | Jean-Pierre Heynderickx (BEL) | Seur | s.t. |
| 7 | Benny Van Brabant (BEL) | Isoglass | s.t. |
| 8 | Manuel Luis Abreu Campos (POR) | Sicasal | s.t. |
| 9 | Patrick Hendrickx (BEL) | Isoglass | s.t. |
| 10 | Ad Wijnands (NED) | Stuttgart–Mercedes–Merckx–Puma | s.t. |

General classification after Stage 3

| Rank | Rider | Team | Time |
|---|---|---|---|
| 1 | Viktor Klimov (URS) | Alfa Lum | 8h 01' 15" |
| 2 | Marek Kulas (POL) | Diana–Colnago–Animex | + 24" |
| 3 | Emilio Cuadrado (ESP) | Puertas Mavisa | + 1' 17" |
| 4 | Stefano Cecini (ITA) | Jolly Componibili–Club 88 | + 1' 26" |
| 5 | Nico Emonds (BEL) | Teka | + 6' 33" |
| 6 | Pello Ruiz Cabestany (ESP) | ONCE | + 7' 05" |
| 7 | Anselmo Fuerte (ESP) | ONCE | s.t. |
| 8 | Melcior Mauri (ESP) | ONCE | s.t. |
| 9 | Johnny Weltz (DEN) | ONCE | + 7' 22" |
| 10 | Marino Lejarreta (ESP) | ONCE | s.t. |

== Stage 4 ==
27 April 1990 — Murcia to Almería, 233.2 km (144.9 mi)

Stage 4 result

| Rank | Rider | Team | Time |
|---|---|---|---|
| 1 | Erwin Nijboer (NED) | Stuttgart–Mercedes–Merckx–Puma | 5h 14' 50" |
| 2 | Valerio Tebaldi (ITA) | Chateau d'Ax–Salotti | + 1" |
| 3 | Uwe Raab (DDR) | PDM–Concorde–Ultima | + 8" |
| 4 | Jesús Blanco Villar (ESP) | Lotus–Festina | s.t. |
| 5 | Joaquín Hernández Hernández (ESP) | Seur | s.t. |
| 6 | Laurent Jalabert (FRA) | Toshiba | s.t. |
| 7 | Andrei Tchmil (URS) | Alfa Lum | s.t. |
| 8 | Johnny Weltz (DEN) | ONCE | s.t. |
| 9 | Miguel Induráin (ESP) | Banesto | s.t. |
| 10 | Manuel Jorge Domínguez (ESP) | IOC–Tulip Computers | s.t. |

General classification after Stage 4

| Rank | Rider | Team | Time |
|---|---|---|---|
| 1 | Viktor Klimov (URS) | Alfa Lum | 13h 16' 13" |
| 2 | Marek Kulas (POL) | Diana–Colnago–Animex | + 1' 16" |
| 3 | Emilio Cuadrado (ESP) | Puertas Mavisa | + 5' 04" |
| 4 | Anselmo Fuerte (ESP) | ONCE | + 7' 05" |
| 5 | Johnny Weltz (DEN) | ONCE | + 7' 22" |
| 6 | Nico Emonds (BEL) | Teka | + 7' 25" |
| 7 | Uwe Raab (DDR) | PDM–Concorde–Ultima | + 7' 36" |
| 8 | Iñaki Gastón (ESP) | CLAS–Cajastur | + 7' 46" |
| 9 | Jesús Blanco Villar (ESP) | Lotus–Festina | + 7' 51" |
| 10 | Joaquín Hernández Hernández (ESP) | Seur | + 7' 56" |

== Stage 5 ==
28 April 1990 — Almería to Sierra Nevada, 198 km (123 mi)

Stage 5 result

| Rank | Rider | Team | Time |
|---|---|---|---|
| 1 | Patrice Esnault (FRA) | BH–Amaya Seguros | 5h 38' 37" |
| 2 | José Martín Farfán (COL) | Kelme–Ibexpress | + 2' 04" |
| 3 | Carlos Jaramillo (COL) | Postobón–Manzana–Ryalcao | + 3' 06" |
| 4 | Tony Rominger (SUI) | Chateau d'Ax–Salotti | + 3' 16" |
| 5 | Luis Herrera (COL) | Café de Colombia | + 3' 25" |
| 6 | Iñaki Gastón (ESP) | CLAS–Cajastur | + 3' 27" |
| 7 | Anselmo Fuerte (ESP) | ONCE | s.t. |
| 8 | Pedro Delgado (ESP) | Banesto | s.t. |
| 9 | Fabio Parra (COL) | Kelme–Ibexpress | s.t. |
| 10 | Uwe Ampler (DDR) | PDM–Concorde–Ultima | s.t. |

General classification after Stage 5

| Rank | Rider | Team | Time |
|---|---|---|---|
| 1 | Viktor Klimov (URS) | Alfa Lum | 19h 03' 18" |
| 2 | Anselmo Fuerte (ESP) | ONCE | + 2' 04" |
| 3 | Patrice Esnault (FRA) | BH–Amaya Seguros | + 2' 23" |
| 4 | Iñaki Gastón (ESP) | CLAS–Cajastur | + 2' 45" |
| 5 | Pello Ruiz Cabestany (ESP) | ONCE | + 2' 56" |
| 6 | Miguel Induráin (ESP) | Banesto | + 3' 01" |
| 7 | Pedro Delgado (ESP) | Banesto | s.t. |
| 8 | Fabio Parra (COL) | Kelme–Ibexpress | + 3' 15" |
| 9 | Luis Herrera (COL) | Café de Colombia | + 3' 23" |
| 10 | Julián Gorospe (ESP) | Banesto | s.t. |

== Stage 6 ==
29 April 1990 — Loja to Ubrique, 195.2 km (121.3 mi)

Stage 6 result

| Rank | Rider | Team | Time |
|---|---|---|---|
| 1 | Jesper Worre (DEN) | Café de Colombia | 5h 08' 49" |
| 2 | Udo Bölts (FRG) | Stuttgart–Mercedes–Merckx–Puma | + 1' 01" |
| 3 | Fernando Quevedo (ESP) | BH–Amaya Seguros | + 1' 02" |
| 4 | Johnny Weltz (DEN) | ONCE | + 1' 05" |
| 5 | Marco Giovannetti (ITA) | Seur | s.t. |
| 6 | Néstor Mora (COL) | Kelme–Ibexpress | s.t. |
| 7 | Fernando Martínez de Guereñu Ochoa (ESP) | Puertas Mavisa | s.t. |
| 8 | Carlos Hernández Bailo (ESP) | Lotus–Festina | s.t. |
| 9 | Jon Unzaga (ESP) | Seur | s.t. |
| 10 | Julián Gorospe (ESP) | Banesto | s.t. |

General classification after Stage 6

| Rank | Rider | Team | Time |
|---|---|---|---|
| 1 | Julián Gorospe (ESP) | Banesto | 24h 16' 35" |
| 2 | Marco Giovannetti (ITA) | Seur | + 25" |
| 3 | Viktor Klimov (URS) | Alfa Lum | + 45" |
| 4 | Julio César Cadena (COL) | Café de Colombia | + 56" |
| 5 | Ivan Ivanov (URS) | Alfa Lum | + 1' 56" |
| 6 | Jon Unzaga (ESP) | Seur | + 2' 30" |
| 7 | José Martín Farfán (COL) | Kelme–Ibexpress | + 2' 41" |
| 8 | Anselmo Fuerte (ESP) | ONCE | + 2' 49" |
| 9 | Patrice Esnault (FRA) | BH–Amaya Seguros | + 3' 08" |
| 10 | Iñaki Gastón (ESP) | CLAS–Cajastur | + 3' 30" |

== Stage 7 ==
30 April 1990 — Jerez to Seville, 187.3 km (116.4 mi)

Stage 7 result

| Rank | Rider | Team | Time |
|---|---|---|---|
| 1 | Benny Van Brabant (BEL) | Isoglass | 4h 29' 19" |
| 2 | Malcolm Elliott (GBR) | Teka | s.t. |
| 3 | Ettore Pastorelli (ITA) | Jolly Componibili–Club 88 | s.t. |
| 4 | Djamolidine Abdoujaparov (URS) | Alfa Lum | s.t. |
| 5 | Laurent Jalabert (FRA) | Toshiba | s.t. |
| 6 | Antonio Esparza (ESP) | Puertas Mavisa | s.t. |
| 7 | Fabrizio Bontempi (ITA) | Diana–Colnago–Animex | s.t. |
| 8 | Manuel Luis Abreu Campos (POR) | Sicasal | s.t. |
| 9 | Giuseppe Calcaterra (ITA) | Chateau d'Ax–Salotti | s.t. |
| 10 | Miguel Ángel Iglesias (ESP) | Puertas Mavisa | s.t. |

General classification after Stage 7

| Rank | Rider | Team | Time |
|---|---|---|---|
| 1 | Julián Gorospe (ESP) | Banesto | 28h 45' 54" |
| 2 | Marco Giovannetti (ITA) | Seur | + 25" |
| 3 | Viktor Klimov (URS) | Alfa Lum | + 45" |
| 4 | Julio César Cadena (COL) | Café de Colombia | + 56" |
| 5 | Ivan Ivanov (URS) | Alfa Lum | + 1' 56" |
| 6 | Jon Unzaga (ESP) | Seur | + 2' 30" |
| 7 | José Martín Farfán (COL) | Kelme–Ibexpress | + 2' 41" |
| 8 | Anselmo Fuerte (ESP) | ONCE | + 2' 49" |
| 9 | Patrice Esnault (FRA) | BH–Amaya Seguros | + 3' 08" |
| 10 | Iñaki Gastón (ESP) | CLAS–Cajastur | + 3' 30" |

== Stage 8 ==
1 May 1990 — Seville to Mérida, 199.6 km (124.0 mi)

Stage 8 result

| Rank | Rider | Team | Time |
|---|---|---|---|
| 1 | Atle Pedersen (NOR) | PDM–Concorde–Ultima | 4h 59' 06" |
| 2 | Mario Scirea (ITA) | Chateau d'Ax–Salotti | s.t. |
| 3 | Mariano Sánchez Martinez (ESP) | Teka | s.t. |
| 4 | Laurent Jalabert (FRA) | Toshiba | s.t. |
| 5 | Luis Javier Lukin (ESP) | Banesto | s.t. |
| 6 | Jacques Decrion (FRA) | BH–Amaya Seguros | s.t. |
| 7 | Darius Kaiser (POL) | Stuttgart–Mercedes–Merckx–Puma | s.t. |
| 8 | Maurizio Rossi (ITA) | Jolly Componibili–Club 88 | s.t. |
| 9 | Miguel Ángel Martínez (ESP) | ONCE | s.t. |
| 10 | Francisco Javier Mauleón (ESP) | CLAS–Cajastur | s.t. |

General classification after Stage 8

| Rank | Rider | Team | Time |
|---|---|---|---|
| 1 | Julián Gorospe (ESP) | Banesto | 33h 49' 45" |
| 2 | Marco Giovannetti (ITA) | Seur | + 25" |
| 3 | Viktor Klimov (URS) | Alfa Lum | + 45" |
| 4 | Julio César Cadena (COL) | Café de Colombia | + 56" |
| 5 | Ivan Ivanov (URS) | Alfa Lum | + 1' 56" |
| 6 | Jon Unzaga (ESP) | Seur | + 2' 30" |
| 7 | Denis Roux (FRA) | Toshiba | + 2' 47" |
| 8 | Anselmo Fuerte (ESP) | ONCE | + 2' 49" |
| 9 | Patrice Esnault (FRA) | BH–Amaya Seguros | + 3' 08" |
| 10 | Iñaki Gastón (ESP) | CLAS–Cajastur | + 3' 30" |

== Stage 9 ==
2 May 1990 — Cáceres to Guijuelo, 192.7 km (119.7 mi)

Stage 9 result

| Rank | Rider | Team | Time |
|---|---|---|---|
| 1 | Néstor Mora (COL) | Kelme–Ibexpress | 5h 31' 57" |
| 2 | Nico Emonds (BEL) | Teka | + 3" |
| 3 | Melcior Mauri (ESP) | ONCE | s.t. |
| 4 | José Andrès Ripoll (ESP) | IOC–Tulip Computers | + 5" |
| 5 | Yvon Madiot (FRA) | Toshiba | + 8" |
| 6 | Demetrio Cuspoca (COL) | Pony Malta | s.t. |
| 7 | Philippe Louviot (FRA) | Toshiba | s.t. |
| 8 | Jean-François Bernard (FRA) | Toshiba | s.t. |
| 9 | Jorge-Manuel Silva (POR) | Sicasal | + 11" |
| 10 | Iñaki Gastón (ESP) | CLAS–Cajastur | + 14" |

General classification after Stage 9

| Rank | Rider | Team | Time |
|---|---|---|---|
| 1 | Julián Gorospe (ESP) | Banesto | 39h 21' 56" |
| 2 | Marco Giovannetti (ITA) | Seur | + 25" |
| 3 | Julio César Cadena (COL) | Café de Colombia | + 56" |
| 4 | Ivan Ivanov (URS) | Alfa Lum | + 1' 56" |
| 5 | Viktor Klimov (URS) | Alfa Lum | + 2' 19" |
| 6 | Jon Unzaga (ESP) | Seur | + 2' 30" |
| 7 | Denis Roux (FRA) | Toshiba | + 2' 47" |
| 8 | Anselmo Fuerte (ESP) | ONCE | + 2' 49" |
| 9 | Iñaki Gastón (ESP) | CLAS–Cajastur | + 3' 30" |
| 10 | Pello Ruiz Cabestany (ESP) | ONCE | + 3' 41" |

== Stage 10 ==
3 May 1990 — Peñaranda de Bracamonte to León, 230 km (140 mi)

Stage 10 result

| Rank | Rider | Team | Time |
|---|---|---|---|
| 1 | Uwe Raab (DDR) | PDM–Concorde–Ultima | 5h 20' 00" |
| 2 | Djamolidine Abdoujaparov (URS) | Alfa Lum | s.t. |
| 3 | Malcolm Elliott (GBR) | Teka | s.t. |
| 4 | Bernd Gröne (FRG) | Stuttgart–Mercedes–Merckx–Puma | s.t. |
| 5 | Laurent Jalabert (FRA) | Toshiba | s.t. |
| 6 | Fabrizio Bontempi (ITA) | Diana–Colnago–Animex | s.t. |
| 7 | Benny Van Brabant (BEL) | Isoglass | s.t. |
| 8 | Claudio Brandini (ITA) | Jolly Componibili–Club 88 | s.t. |
| 9 | Giuseppe Calcaterra (ITA) | Chateau d'Ax–Salotti | s.t. |
| 10 | Casimiro Moreda (ESP) | CLAS–Cajastur | s.t. |

General classification after Stage 10

| Rank | Rider | Team | Time |
|---|---|---|---|
| 1 | Julián Gorospe (ESP) | Banesto | 44h 41' 56" |
| 2 | Marco Giovannetti (ITA) | Seur | + 25" |
| 3 | Julio César Cadena (COL) | Café de Colombia | + 56" |
| 4 | Ivan Ivanov (URS) | Alfa Lum | + 1' 56" |
| 5 | Viktor Klimov (URS) | Alfa Lum | + 2' 19" |
| 6 | Jon Unzaga (ESP) | Seur | + 2' 30" |
| 7 | Denis Roux (FRA) | Toshiba | + 2' 47" |
| 8 | Anselmo Fuerte (ESP) | ONCE | + 2' 49" |
| 9 | Iñaki Gastón (ESP) | CLAS–Cajastur | + 3' 30" |
| 10 | Pello Ruiz Cabestany (ESP) | ONCE | + 3' 41" |

== Stage 11 ==
4 May 1990 — León to San Isidro, 203 km (126 mi)

Stage 11 result

| Rank | Rider | Team | Time |
|---|---|---|---|
| 1 | Carlos Hernández Bailo (ESP) | Lotus–Festina | 5h 42' 04" |
| 2 | Álvaro Mejía (COL) | Postobón–Manzana–Ryalcao | + 42" |
| 3 | Tony Rominger (SUI) | Chateau d'Ax–Salotti | + 44" |
| 4 | Miguel Induráin (ESP) | Banesto | + 46" |
| 5 | Anselmo Fuerte (ESP) | ONCE | + 50" |
| 6 | Iñaki Gastón (ESP) | CLAS–Cajastur | s.t. |
| 7 | Álvaro Pino (ESP) | Seur | s.t. |
| 8 | Fabio Parra (COL) | Kelme–Ibexpress | s.t. |
| 9 | Pedro Delgado (ESP) | Banesto | s.t. |
| 10 | Henry Cárdenas (COL) | Café de Colombia | s.t. |

General classification after Stage 11

| Rank | Rider | Team | Time |
|---|---|---|---|
| 1 | Marco Giovannetti (ITA) | Seur | 50h 25' 28" |
| 2 | Julio César Cadena (COL) | Café de Colombia | + 41" |
| 3 | Anselmo Fuerte (ESP) | ONCE | + 2' 11" |
| 4 | Julián Gorospe (ESP) | Banesto | + 2' 40" |
| 5 | Iñaki Gastón (ESP) | CLAS–Cajastur | + 2' 52" |
| 6 | Ivan Ivanov (URS) | Alfa Lum | + 2' 55" |
| 7 | Miguel Induráin (ESP) | Banesto | + 3' 04" |
| 8 | Pedro Delgado (ESP) | Banesto | + 3' 08" |
| 9 | Fabio Parra (COL) | Kelme–Ibexpress | + 3' 22" |
| 10 | Pello Ruiz Cabestany (ESP) | ONCE | + 3' 26" |
