= 1990 Vuelta a España, Stage 12 to Stage 22 =

Cycling race stages

The 1990 Vuelta a España was the 45th edition of the Vuelta a España, one of cycling's Grand Tours. The Vuelta began in Benicàssim, with an individual time trial on 24 April, and Stage 12 occurred on 5 May with a stage from San Isidro. The race finished in Madrid on 15 May.

== Stage 12 ==
5 May 1990 — San Isidro to Naranco, 156 km (97 mi)

Stage 12 result

Rank	Rider	Team	Time
1	Alberto Camargo (COL)	Café de Colombia	3h 56' 18"
2	José Martín Farfán (COL)	Kelme–Ibexpress	+ 1' 25"
3	Josef Holzmann (FRG)	Stuttgart–Mercedes–Merckx–Puma	+ 1' 27"
4	Luis Javier Lukin (ESP)	Banesto	+ 1' 43"
5	Luis Pérez García (ESP)	Lotus–Festina	+ 1' 51"
6	Gerardo Moncada (COL)	Postobón–Manzana–Ryalcao	s.t.
7	Franco Vona (ITA)	Chateau d'Ax–Salotti	+ 2' 01"
8	Óscar Vargas (COL)	Postobón–Manzana–Ryalcao	+ 2' 06"
9	Luis Herrera (COL)	Café de Colombia	s.t.
10	Dirk De Wolf (BEL)	PDM–Concorde–Ultima	+ 2' 12"

General classification after Stage 12

Rank	Rider	Team	Time
1	Marco Giovannetti (ITA)	Seur	54h 24' 21"
2	Julio César Cadena (COL)	Café de Colombia	+ 41"
3	Anselmo Fuerte (ESP)	ONCE	+ 1' 58"
4	Iñaki Gastón (ESP)	CLAS–Cajastur	+ 2' 31"
5	Miguel Induráin (ESP)	Banesto	+ 2' 47"
6	Pedro Delgado (ESP)	Banesto	+ 2' 51"
7	Fabio Parra (COL)	Kelme–Ibexpress	+ 3' 13"
8	Pello Ruiz Cabestany (ESP)	ONCE	+ 3' 16"
9	Álvaro Pino (ESP)	Seur	+ 3' 39"
10	José Martín Farfán (COL)	Kelme–Ibexpress	+ 3' 46"

== Stage 13 ==
6 May 1990 — Oviedo to Santander, 193.3 km (120.1 mi)

Stage 13 result

Rank	Rider	Team	Time
1	Nico Emonds (BEL)	Teka	4h 21' 27"
2	Laurent Jalabert (FRA)	Toshiba	+ 3' 00"
3	Andrei Tchmil (URS)	Alfa Lum	s.t.
4	Dirk De Wolf (BEL)	PDM–Concorde–Ultima	s.t.
5	Jesús Montoya (ESP)	BH–Amaya Seguros	s.t.
6	José Luis Navarro (ESP)	Seur	s.t.
7	Carlos Hernández Bailo (ESP)	Lotus–Festina	s.t.
8	Patrick Roelandt (BEL)	Isoglass	s.t.
9	Henry Cárdenas (COL)	Café de Colombia	s.t.
10	Philippe Louviot (FRA)	Toshiba	s.t.

General classification after Stage 13

Rank	Rider	Team	Time
1	Marco Giovannetti (ITA)	Seur	58h 51' 19"
2	Julio César Cadena (COL)	Café de Colombia	+ 41"
3	Anselmo Fuerte (ESP)	ONCE	+ 1' 58"
4	Iñaki Gastón (ESP)	CLAS–Cajastur	+ 2' 31"
5	Miguel Induráin (ESP)	Banesto	+ 2' 47"
6	Pedro Delgado (ESP)	Banesto	+ 2' 51"
7	Fabio Parra (COL)	Kelme–Ibexpress	+ 3' 13"
8	Pello Ruiz Cabestany (ESP)	ONCE	+ 3' 16"
9	Álvaro Pino (ESP)	Seur	+ 3' 39"
10	José Martín Farfán (COL)	Kelme–Ibexpress	+ 3' 46"

== Stage 14 ==
7 May 1990 — Santander to Nájera, 207 km (129 mi)

Stage 14 result

Rank	Rider	Team	Time
1	Bernd Gröne (FRG)	Stuttgart–Mercedes–Merckx–Puma	5h 14' 25"
2	Uwe Raab (DDR)	PDM–Concorde–Ultima	s.t.
3	Giuseppe Calcaterra (ITA)	Chateau d'Ax–Salotti	s.t.
4	Mario Scirea (ITA)	Chateau d'Ax–Salotti	s.t.
5	Manuel Luis Abreu Campos (POR)	Sicasal	s.t.
6	Miguel Ángel Iglesias (ESP)	Puertas Mavisa	s.t.
7	Casimiro Moreda (ESP)	CLAS–Cajastur	s.t.
8	Ad Wijnands (NED)	Stuttgart–Mercedes–Merckx–Puma	s.t.
9	Ettore Pastorelli (ITA)	Jolly Componibili–Club 88	s.t.
10	Pello Ruiz Cabestany (ESP)	ONCE	s.t.

General classification after Stage 14

Rank	Rider	Team	Time
1	Marco Giovannetti (ITA)	Seur	64h 05' 44"
2	Julio César Cadena (COL)	Café de Colombia	+ 41"
3	Anselmo Fuerte (ESP)	ONCE	+ 1' 58"
4	Iñaki Gastón (ESP)	CLAS–Cajastur	+ 2' 31"
5	Miguel Induráin (ESP)	Banesto	+ 2' 47"
6	Pedro Delgado (ESP)	Banesto	+ 2' 51"
7	Fabio Parra (COL)	Kelme–Ibexpress	+ 3' 13"
8	Pello Ruiz Cabestany (ESP)	ONCE	+ 3' 16"
9	Álvaro Pino (ESP)	Seur	+ 3' 39"
10	José Martín Farfán (COL)	Kelme–Ibexpress	+ 3' 46"

== Stage 15 ==
8 May 1990 — Ezcaray to Valdezcaray, 24 km (15 mi) (ITT)

Stage 15 result

Rank	Rider	Team	Time
1	Jean-François Bernard (FRA)	Toshiba	52' 14"
2	Vladimir Poulnikov (URS)	Alfa Lum	+ 1' 03"
3	Philippe Louviot (FRA)	Toshiba	+ 2' 41"
4	Uwe Ampler (DDR)	PDM–Concorde–Ultima	+ 3' 01"
5	Joaquim Llach Ramisa (ESP)	IOC–Tulip Computers	+ 3' 04"
6	Álvaro Mejía (COL)	Postobón–Manzana–Ryalcao	s.t.
7	Julián Gorospe (ESP)	Banesto	+ 3' 05"
8	Carlos Jaramillo (COL)	Postobón–Manzana–Ryalcao	+ 3' 06"
9	Pello Ruiz Cabestany (ESP)	ONCE	+ 3' 26"
10	Juan Martínez Oliver (ESP)	Banesto	+ 3' 34"

General classification after Stage 15

Rank	Rider	Team	Time
1	Marco Giovannetti (ITA)	Seur	65h 03' 08"
2	Anselmo Fuerte (ESP)	ONCE	+ 1' 31"
3	Pello Ruiz Cabestany (ESP)	ONCE	+ 1' 32"
4	Pedro Delgado (ESP)	Banesto	+ 2' 00"
5	Julián Gorospe (ESP)	Banesto	+ 2' 01"
6	Ivan Ivanov (URS)	Alfa Lum	+ 2' 29"
7	Fabio Parra (COL)	Kelme–Ibexpress	+ 2' 35"
8	Miguel Induráin (ESP)	Banesto	+ 2' 53"
9	Álvaro Pino (ESP)	Seur	+ 3' 02"
10	José Martín Farfán (COL)	Kelme–Ibexpress	+ 4' 34"

== Stage 16 ==
9 May 1990 — Logroño to Pamplona, 165 km (103 mi)

Stage 16 result

Rank	Rider	Team	Time
1	Uwe Raab (DDR)	PDM–Concorde–Ultima	4h 44' 19"
2	Malcolm Elliott (GBR)	Teka	s.t.
3	Camillo Passera (ITA)	Chateau d'Ax–Salotti	s.t.
4	Giuseppe Calcaterra (ITA)	Chateau d'Ax–Salotti	s.t.
5	Asiat Saitov (URS)	Alfa Lum	s.t.
6	Manuel Luis Abreu Campos (POR)	Sicasal	s.t.
7	Ettore Pastorelli (ITA)	Jolly Componibili–Club 88	s.t.
8	Udo Bölts (FRG)	Stuttgart–Mercedes–Merckx–Puma	s.t.
9	Benny Van Brabant (BEL)	Isoglass	s.t.
10	Laurent Jalabert (FRA)	Toshiba	s.t.

General classification after Stage 16

Rank	Rider	Team	Time
1	Marco Giovannetti (ITA)	Seur	69h 47' 27"
2	Anselmo Fuerte (ESP)	ONCE	+ 1' 31"
3	Pello Ruiz Cabestany (ESP)	ONCE	+ 1' 32"
4	Pedro Delgado (ESP)	Banesto	+ 2' 00"
5	Julián Gorospe (ESP)	Banesto	+ 2' 01"
6	Ivan Ivanov (URS)	Alfa Lum	+ 2' 29"
7	Fabio Parra (COL)	Kelme–Ibexpress	+ 2' 35"
8	Miguel Induráin (ESP)	Banesto	+ 2' 53"
9	Álvaro Pino (ESP)	Seur	+ 3' 02"
10	José Martín Farfán (COL)	Kelme–Ibexpress	+ 4' 34"

== Stage 17 ==
10 May 1990 — Pamplona to Jaca, 151 km (94 mi)

Stage 17 result

Rank	Rider	Team	Time
1	Federico Echave (ESP)	CLAS–Cajastur	3h 55' 47"
2	Cássio Freitas (BRA)	Sicasal	s.t.
3	Fernando Quevedo (ESP)	BH–Amaya Seguros	+ 26"
4	Vicente Prado Huergo (ESP)	IOC–Tulip Computers	+ 43"
5	Giuseppe Calcaterra (ITA)	Chateau d'Ax–Salotti	+ 1' 00"
6	Vladimir Poulnikov (URS)	Alfa Lum	+ 3' 43"
7	Nico Emonds (BEL)	Teka	s.t.
8	Marino Lejarreta (ESP)	ONCE	s.t.
9	Marino Alonso (ESP)	Banesto	s.t.
10	Abelardo Rondón (ESP)	Banesto	+ 3' 49"

General classification after Stage 17

Rank	Rider	Team	Time
1	Marco Giovannetti (ITA)	Seur	73h 48' 16"
2	Anselmo Fuerte (ESP)	ONCE	+ 1' 31"
3	Pello Ruiz Cabestany (ESP)	ONCE	+ 1' 32"
4	Pedro Delgado (ESP)	Banesto	+ 2' 00"
5	Julián Gorospe (ESP)	Banesto	+ 2' 01"
6	Ivan Ivanov (URS)	Alfa Lum	+ 2' 29"
7	Fabio Parra (COL)	Kelme–Ibexpress	+ 2' 35"
8	Federico Echave (ESP)	CLAS–Cajastur	+ 2' 37"
9	Miguel Induráin (ESP)	Banesto	+ 2' 53"
10	Álvaro Pino (ESP)	Seur	+ 3' 02"

== Stage 18 ==
11 May 1990 — Jaca to Cerler, 178 km (111 mi)

Stage 18 result

Rank	Rider	Team	Time
1	José Martín Farfán (COL)	Kelme–Ibexpress	4h 34' 05"
2	Fabio Parra (COL)	Kelme–Ibexpress	s.t.
3	Iñaki Gastón (ESP)	CLAS–Cajastur	+ 52"
4	Pello Ruiz Cabestany (ESP)	ONCE	+ 1' 00"
5	Álvaro Mejía (COL)	Postobón–Manzana–Ryalcao	s.t.
6	Anselmo Fuerte (ESP)	ONCE	s.t.
7	Carlos Jaramillo (COL)	Postobón–Manzana–Ryalcao	s.t.
8	Marco Giovannetti (ITA)	Seur	s.t.
9	Pedro Delgado (ESP)	Banesto	s.t.
10	Óscar Vargas (COL)	Postobón–Manzana–Ryalcao	s.t.

General classification after Stage 18

Rank	Rider	Team	Time
1	Marco Giovannetti (ITA)	Seur	78h 23' 21"
2	Anselmo Fuerte (ESP)	ONCE	+ 1' 31"
3	Pello Ruiz Cabestany (ESP)	ONCE	+ 1' 32"
4	Fabio Parra (COL)	Kelme–Ibexpress	+ 1' 35"
5	Pedro Delgado (ESP)	Banesto	+ 2' 00"
6	José Martín Farfán (COL)	Kelme–Ibexpress	+ 3' 34"
7	Miguel Induráin (ESP)	Banesto	+ 3' 43"
8	Ivan Ivanov (URS)	Alfa Lum	+ 3' 44"
9	Federico Echave (ESP)	CLAS–Cajastur	+ 3' 52"
10	Álvaro Pino (ESP)	Seur	+ 4' 17"

== Stage 19 ==
12 May 1990 — Benasque to Zaragoza, 223 km (139 mi)

Stage 19 result

Rank	Rider	Team	Time
1	Asiat Saitov (URS)	Alfa Lum	5h 29' 43"
2	Uwe Raab (DDR)	PDM–Concorde–Ultima	s.t.
3	Camillo Passera (ITA)	Chateau d'Ax–Salotti	s.t.
4	Mario Kummer (DDR)	Chateau d'Ax–Salotti	s.t.
5	Manuel Jorge Domínguez (ESP)	IOC–Tulip Computers	s.t.
6	Alfonso Gutiérrez (ESP)	BH–Amaya Seguros	s.t.
7	Laurent Jalabert (FRA)	Toshiba	s.t.
8	Ad Wijnands (NED)	Stuttgart–Mercedes–Merckx–Puma	s.t.
9	Casimiro Moreda (ESP)	CLAS–Cajastur	s.t.
10	Antonio Esparza (ESP)	Puertas Mavisa	s.t.

General classification after Stage 19

Rank	Rider	Team	Time
1	Marco Giovannetti (ITA)	Seur	83h 53' 04"
2	Anselmo Fuerte (ESP)	ONCE	+ 1' 31"
3	Pello Ruiz Cabestany (ESP)	ONCE	+ 1' 32"
4	Fabio Parra (COL)	Kelme–Ibexpress	+ 1' 35"
5	Pedro Delgado (ESP)	Banesto	+ 2' 00"
6	José Martín Farfán (COL)	Kelme–Ibexpress	+ 3' 34"
7	Miguel Induráin (ESP)	Banesto	+ 3' 43"
8	Ivan Ivanov (URS)	Alfa Lum	+ 3' 44"
9	Federico Echave (ESP)	CLAS–Cajastur	+ 3' 52"
10	Álvaro Pino (ESP)	Seur	+ 4' 17"

== Stage 20 ==
13 May 1990 — Zaragoza to Zaragoza, 39 km (24 mi) (ITT)

Stage 20 result

Rank	Rider	Team	Time
1	Pello Ruiz Cabestany (ESP)	ONCE	48' 34"
2	Pedro Delgado (ESP)	Banesto	+ 36"
3	Uwe Ampler (DDR)	PDM–Concorde–Ultima	+ 42"
4	Miguel Induráin (ESP)	Banesto	+ 51"
5	Marco Giovannetti (ITA)	Seur	+ 1' 08"
6	Federico Echave (ESP)	CLAS–Cajastur	s.t.
7	Melcior Mauri (ESP)	ONCE	+ 1' 11"
8	Erwin Nijboer (NED)	Stuttgart–Mercedes–Merckx–Puma	s.t.
9	Philippe Louviot (FRA)	Toshiba	+ 1' 21"
10	Anselmo Fuerte (ESP)	ONCE	+ 1' 25"

General classification after Stage 20

Rank	Rider	Team	Time
1	Marco Giovannetti (ITA)	Seur	84h 42' 46"
2	Pello Ruiz Cabestany (ESP)	ONCE	+ 24"
3	Pedro Delgado (ESP)	Banesto	+ 1' 28"
4	Anselmo Fuerte (ESP)	ONCE	+ 1' 48"
5	Fabio Parra (COL)	Kelme–Ibexpress	+ 3' 07"
6	Miguel Induráin (ESP)	Banesto	+ 3' 26"
7	Federico Echave (ESP)	CLAS–Cajastur	+ 3' 52"
8	José Martín Farfán (COL)	Kelme–Ibexpress	+ 6' 35"
9	Ivan Ivanov (URS)	Alfa Lum	+ 6' 48"
10	Óscar Vargas (COL)	Postobón–Manzana–Ryalcao	+ 6' 55"

== Stage 21 ==
14 May 1990 — Collado Villalba to Palazuelos de Eresma, 188 km (117 mi)

Stage 21 result

Rank	Rider	Team	Time
1	Denis Roux (FRA)	Toshiba	5h 09' 26"
2	Uwe Ampler (DDR)	PDM–Concorde–Ultima	+ 4"
3	Federico Echave (ESP)	CLAS–Cajastur	s.t.
4	Pedro Delgado (ESP)	Banesto	s.t.
5	Anselmo Fuerte (ESP)	ONCE	s.t.
6	Marco Giovannetti (ITA)	Seur	s.t.
7	Ivan Ivanov (URS)	Alfa Lum	s.t.
8	Fabio Parra (COL)	Kelme–Ibexpress	s.t.
9	Álvaro Mejía (COL)	Postobón–Manzana–Ryalcao	s.t.
10	Francisco Rodríguez Maldonado (COL)	Pony Malta	s.t.

General classification after Stage 21

Rank	Rider	Team	Time
1	Marco Giovannetti (ITA)	Seur	89h 52' 16"
2	Pedro Delgado (ESP)	Banesto	+ 1' 28"
3	Anselmo Fuerte (ESP)	ONCE	+ 1' 48"
4	Pello Ruiz Cabestany (ESP)	ONCE	+ 2' 16"
5	Fabio Parra (COL)	Kelme–Ibexpress	+ 3' 07"
6	Federico Echave (ESP)	CLAS–Cajastur	+ 3' 52"
7	Miguel Induráin (ESP)	Banesto	+ 6' 22"
8	Ivan Ivanov (URS)	Alfa Lum	+ 6' 48"
9	Uwe Ampler (DDR)	PDM–Concorde–Ultima	+ 7' 15"
10	Denis Roux (FRA)	Toshiba	+ 7' 56"

== Stage 22 ==
15 May 1990 — Segovia to Madrid, 176 km (109 mi)

Stage 22 result

Rank	Rider	Team	Time
1	Uwe Raab (DDR)	PDM–Concorde–Ultima	4h 44' 24"
2	Malcolm Elliott (GBR)	Teka	s.t.
3	Benny Van Brabant (BEL)	Isoglass	s.t.
4	Camillo Passera (ITA)	Chateau d'Ax–Salotti	s.t.
5	Casimiro Moreda (ESP)	CLAS–Cajastur	s.t.
6	Asiat Saitov (URS)	Alfa Lum	s.t.
7	Ad Wijnands (NED)	Stuttgart–Mercedes–Merckx–Puma	s.t.
8	Johnny Weltz (DEN)	ONCE	s.t.
9	Manuel Luis Abreu Campos (POR)	Sicasal	s.t.
10	Alfonso Gutiérrez (ESP)	BH–Amaya Seguros	s.t.

General classification after Stage 22

Rank	Rider	Team	Time
1	Marco Giovannetti (ITA)	Seur	94h 36' 40"
2	Pedro Delgado (ESP)	Banesto	+ 1' 28"
3	Anselmo Fuerte (ESP)	ONCE	+ 1' 48"
4	Pello Ruiz Cabestany (ESP)	ONCE	+ 2' 16"
5	Fabio Parra (COL)	Kelme–Ibexpress	+ 3' 07"
6	Federico Echave (ESP)	CLAS–Cajastur	+ 3' 52"
7	Miguel Induráin (ESP)	Banesto	+ 6' 22"
8	Ivan Ivanov (URS)	Alfa Lum	+ 6' 48"
9	Uwe Ampler (DDR)	PDM–Concorde–Ultima	+ 7' 15"
10	Denis Roux (FRA)	Toshiba	+ 7' 56"
