= 1987 Tirreno–Adriatico =

Race details
- Dates: 12–18 March 1987
- Stages: 6 + Prologue
- Distance: 935.65 km (581.4 mi)
- Winning time: 25h 22' 21"

Results
	Winner	Rolf Sørensen (DEN)	(Remac–Fanini)
	Second	Giuseppe Calcaterra (ITA)	(Atala–Ofmega)
	Third	Tony Rominger (SUI)	(Supermercati Brianzoli–Chateau d'Ax)

The 1987 Tirreno–Adriatico was the 22nd edition of the Tirreno–Adriatico cycle race and was held from 12 March to 18 March 1987. The race started in Latina and finished in San Benedetto del Tronto. The race was won by Rolf Sørensen of the Remac–Fanini team.

== General classification ==
Final general classification

Rank	Rider	Team	Time
1	Rolf Sørensen (DEN)	Remac–Fanini	25h 22' 21"
2	Giuseppe Calcaterra (ITA)	Atala–Ofmega	+ 5"
3	Tony Rominger (SUI)	Supermercati Brianzoli–Chateau d'Ax	+ 6"
4	Teun van Vliet (NED)	Panasonic–Isostar	+ 13"
5	Francesco Moser (ITA)	Supermercati Brianzoli–Chateau d'Ax	+ 22"
6	Jesper Worre (DEN)	Selca	+ 28"
7	Guido Winterberg (SUI)	Toshiba–Look	+ 28"
8	Franco Chioccioli (ITA)	Gis Gelati–Jollyscarpe	+ 31"
9	Giuseppe Petito (ITA)	Gis Gelati–Jollyscarpe	+ 36"
10	Daniele Caroli (ITA)	Ecoflam–BFB Bruciatori–Mareco–Alfa Lum	+ 49"
