= 1987 Grand Prix d'Automne =

Race details
- Dates: 11 October 1987
- Stages: 1
- Distance: 255 km (158.4 mi)
- Winning time: 6h 35' 46"

Results
	Winner	Adri van der Poel (NED)	(PDM–Ultima–Concorde)
	Second	Teun van Vliet (NED)	(Panasonic–Isostar)
	Third	Maurizio Fondriest (ITA)	(Ecoflam–BFB Bruciatori–Mareco–Alfa Lum)

The 1987 Grand Prix d'Automne was the 81st edition of the Paris–Tours cycle race and was held on 11 October 1987. The race started in Créteil and finished in Chaville. The race was won by Adri van der Poel of the PDM team.

== General classification ==
Final general classification

Rank	Rider	Team	Time
1	Adri van der Poel (NED)	PDM–Ultima–Concorde	6h 35' 46"
2	Teun van Vliet (NED)	Panasonic–Isostar	+ 0"
3	Maurizio Fondriest (ITA)	Ecoflam–BFB Bruciatori–Mareco–Alfa Lum	+ 0"
4	Charly Mottet (FRA)	Système U	+ 0"
5	Bruno Leali (ITA)	Carrera Jeans–Vagabond	+ 0"
6	Eric Vanderaerden (BEL)	Panasonic–Isostar	+ 41"
7	Moreno Argentin (ITA)	Gewiss–Bianchi	+ 41"
8	Claudio Chiappucci (ITA)	Carrera Jeans–Vagabond	+ 41"
9	Gilbert Glaus (SUI)	Vétements Z–Peugeot	+ 41"
10	Camillo Passera (ITA)	Ecoflam–BFB Bruciatori–Mareco–Alfa Lum	+ 41"
