= 1987 Tour de Suisse =

Race details
- Dates: 16–25 June 1987
- Stages: 10 + Prologue
- Distance: 1,699 km (1,056 mi)
- Winning time: 44h 14' 17"

Results
	Winner	Andrew Hampsten (USA)	(7-Eleven)
	Second	Peter Winnen (NED)	(Panasonic–Isostar)
	Third	Fabio Parra (COL)	(Café de Colombia–Varta)
	Points	Marc Sergeant (BEL)	(Lotto–Merckx)
	Mountains	Fabio Parra (COL)	(Café de Colombia–Varta)
	Combination	Marc Sergeant (BEL)	(Lotto–Merckx)
	Team	Carrera Jeans–Vagabond	

The 1987 Tour de Suisse was the 51st edition of the Tour de Suisse cycle race and was held from 16 June to 25 June 1987. The race started in Affoltern am Albis and finished in Zürich. The race was won by Andrew Hampsten of the 7-Eleven team.

== Teams ==
In total, fourteen teams of up to nine riders, plus eight independent riders started the race.

7 Eleven–Hoonved
No.	Rider	Pos.
1	Andrew Hampsten (USA)	1
2	Ron Kiefel (USA)	71
3	Bob Roll (USA)	56
4	Jeff Pierce (USA)	32
5	Davis Phinney (USA)	DNF
6	Jeff Bradley (USA)	DNF
7	Raúl Alcalá (MEX)	20
9	Dag Otto Lauritzen (NOR)	62
10	Jacques Boyer (USA)	59
Directeur sportif: Mike Neel

Panasonic–Isostar–Merckx
No.	Rider	Pos.
11	Eric Vanderaerden (BEL)	DNF
12	Eric Van Lancker (BEL)	41
13	Ludo de Keulenaer (BEL)	81
14	Peter Harings (NED)	87
15	Peter Winnen (NED)	2
16	Teun van Vliet (NED)	72
18	Allan Peiper (AUS)	74
19	Urs Freuler (SUI)	82
20	John Talen (NED)	DNF
Directeur sportif: Peter Post

Toshiba–Look
No.	Rider	Pos.
21	Niki Rüttimann (SUI)	31
22	Othmar Haefliger (SUI)	DNF
23	Heinz Imboden (SUI)	37
24	Pascal Richard (SUI)	DNF
25	Guido Winterberg (SUI)	13
26	Jean-Claude Leclercq (FRA)	DNF
27	Vincent Barteau (FRA)	DNF
28	Dominique Garde (FRA)	63
29	Andreas Kappes (GER)	8
Directeur sportif: Paul Köchli

Carrera
No.	Rider	Pos.
32	Walter Magnago (ITA)	36
33	Fabio Bordonali (ITA)	69
34	Marco Bergamo (ITA)	43
35	Giancarlo Perini (ITA)	30
36	Bruno Leali (ITA)	DNF
37	Urs Zimmermann (SUI)	68
38	Erich Maechler (SUI)	35
39	Jørgen Pedersen (DEN)	18
40	Franco Votolo (ITA)	52
Directeur sportif: Davide Boifava

Système U
No.	Rider	Pos.
41	Laurent Fignon (FRA)	DNF
42	Laurent Biondi (FRA)	DNF
44	Christophe Lavainne (FRA)	55
45	Joël Pelier (FRA)	DNF
46	Gérard Rué (FRA)	65
47	Bernard Gavillet (SUI)	17
49	Jonas Tegstroem (SWE)	53
50	Charly Mottet (FRA)	39
Directeur sportif: Cyrille Guimard

PDM
No.	Rider	Pos.
51	Pedro Delgado (ESP)	40
52	José Luis Laguía (ESP)	DNF
54	Steven Rooks (NED)	11
55	Peter Stevenhaagen (NED)	26
56	Gert-Jan Theunisse (NED)	47
57	Gerard Veldscholten (NED)	48
58	Jörg Müller (SUI)	44
59	Stefan Mutter (SUI)	34
60	Hans Daams (SUI)	89
Directeur sportif: Jan Gijsbers

Isotonic–Cynderella–Blacky–Look
No.	Rider	Pos.
61	Beat Breu (SUI)	15
62	Daniel Gisiger (SUI)	22
63	Bruno Holenweger (SUI)	DNF
64	Rolf Järmann (SUI)	80
65	Pius Schwarzentruber (SUI)	85
66	Kurt Steinmann (SUI)	76
67	Wener Stutz (SUI)	DNF
68	Fabian Fuchs (SUI)	29
69	Markuks Eberli (SUI)	DNF
Directeur sportif: Unknown

Kas–Miko/Supermercati Brianzoli–Chateau d'Ax
No.	Rider	Pos.
71	Acácio da Silva (POR)	9
72	Stephen Hodge (AUS)	16
73	Stephan Joho (SUI)	66
74	Alfred Achermann (SUI)	75
75	Thomas Wegmüller (SUI)	70
76	Peter Steiger (SUI)	90
77	Sigmund Hermann (SUI)	DNF
78	Tony Rominger (SUI)	60
79	Hubert Seiz (SUI)	25
Directeur sportif: Christian Rumeau

Muller–Fibok
No.	Rider	Pos.
81	Enrico Pocchinni (ITA)	38
83	Gody Schmutz (SUI)	10
84	Serge Demierre (SUI)	DNF
85	Edi Kaegi (SUI)	85
86	Bruno Hurlimann (SUI)	51
87	John Baldi (ITA)	12
88	Stefano Colage (ITA)	DNF
89	Claudio Vandelli (ITA)	50
90	Giancarlo Montedori (ITA)	DNF
Directeur sportif: Unknown

Café de Colombia
No.	Rider	Pos.
91	Rafaël Antonio Acevedo (COL)	33
92	Antonio Agudelo (COL)	DNF
93	Fabio Parra (COL)	3
94	Julio César Cadena (COL)	23
95	Edgar Corredor (COL)	DNF
96	Martín Ramírez (COL)	24
98	Omar Neira (COL)	49
100	Marco León (COL)	57
Directeur sportif: Rafael Antonio Niño

GIS Gelati-Jollyscarpe
No.	Rider	Pos.
101	Franco Chioccioli (ITA)	DNF
102	Marco Giovannetti (ITA)	4
104	Palmiro Masciarelli (ITA)	DNF
105	Filipo Piersanti (ITA)	DNF
106	Ennio Salvador (ITA)	61
107	Giuseppe Petito (ITA)	DNF
108	Luigi Severini (NED)	DNF
109	Johan Van de Velde (NED)	DNF
110	Adriano Baffi (ITA)	78
Directeur sportif: Unknown

Ariostea-Gres
No.	Rider	Pos.
111	Alessandro Paganessi (ITA)	6
112	Valerio Piva (ITA)	DNF
113	Kjell Nilsson (SWE)	45
114	Domenico Cavallo (ITA)	DNF
116	Maurizio Vandelli (ITA)	DNF
117	Alfio Vandi (ITA)	19
118	Sergio Santimaria (ITA)	58
119	Dag Erik Pedersen (NOR)	DNF
120	Marcello Siboni (ITA)	21
Directeur sportif: Unknown

Lotto-Emerxil-Merckx
No.	Rider	Pos.
121	Marc Sergeant (BEL)	54
123	Michel Dernies (BEL)	84
124	Jan Goessens (BEL)	77
125	Frank Van de Vijver (BEL)	79
126	Wim Van Eynde (BEL)	64
128	Willem Wijnant (BEL)	DNF
129	Jan Nevens (BEL)	27
130	Geert Vandewalle (BEL)	88
Directeur sportif: Walter Godefroot

Paini–Bottecchia
No.	Rider	Pos.
131	Marco Vitali (ITA)	DNF
132	André Massard (SUI)	89
133	Alain von Allmen (SUI)	67
134	Mauro Gianetti (SUI)	28
135	Rocco Cattaneo (SUI)	5
136	Paul Popp (AUT)	DNF
137	Jürg Bruggmann (SUI)	DNF
140	Walter Delle Case (ITA)	DNF
141	Daniel Wyder (SUI)	DNF
Directeur sportif: Unknown

Individuals
No.	Rider	Pos.
142	Albert Sweifel (SUI)	DNF
144	Guido Frei (SUI)	83
145	Max Hurrzeler (SUI)	DNF
146	Antonio Ferretti (SUI)	14
147	Dietrich Thurau (FRG)	7
148	Roy Knickmann (USA)	42
149	Hansruedi Marki (SUI)	DNF
150	Doug Shapiro (USA)	DNF
Directeur sportif: None

== General classification ==
Final general classification

Rank	Rider	Team	Time
1	Andrew Hampsten (USA)	7-Eleven	44h 14' 17"
2	Peter Winnen (NED)	Panasonic–Isostar	+ 1"
3	Fabio Parra (COL)	Café de Colombia–Varta	+ 7"
4	Marco Giovannetti (ITA)	Gis Gelati–Jollyscarpe	+ 28"
5	Rocco Cattaneo (SUI)	Paini–Bottecchia–Sidi	+ 1' 04"
6	Alessandro Paganessi (ITA)	Ariostea–Gres	+ 1' 25"
7	Dietrich Thurau (FRG)	Individual	+ 2' 01"
8	Andreas Kappes (FRG)	Toshiba–Look	+ 2' 10"
9	Acácio da Silva (POR)	Kas	+ 3' 01"
10	Gottfried Schmutz (SUI)	Fibok-Müller	+ 3' 25"

== Stages ==
=== Prologue ===
Affoltern am Albis, 8.5 km ITT

1. Werner Stutz in 11'21"
2. Andrew Hampsten at 2"
3. Guido Winterberg at 7"
4. Tony Rominger at 9"
5. Eric Pedersen at 10"
6. Dag-Otto Lauritzen
7. Stephan Joho at 11"
8. Alan Peiper at 14"
9. Acácio da Silva
10. Marco Giovannetti at 15"

=== Stage 1 ===
Affoltern am Albis-Rugell/Lie, 170 km

1. Adriano Baffi in 4h31'15"
2. Alan Peiper
3. Raúl Alcalá at 2"
4. Marc Sergeant at 11"
5. Gert-Jan Theunisse
6. Jean-Claude Leclercq
7. Hans Daams at 30"
8. Peter Stevenhaagen
9. Max Hürzeler
10. Davis Phinney

=== Stage 2 ===
Rugell/Bendern-Leibstadt, 178.5 km

1. Steven Rooks in 4h39'16"
2. Acácio da Silva
3. Marc Sergeant at 14"
4. Marco Vitali
5. Erich Maechler
6. Andreas Kappes
7. Heinz Imboden
8. Alan Peiper at 1'05"
9. Andrew Hampsten
10. Daniel Gisiger at 1'23"

=== Stage 3 ===
Leibstadt-Basel, 141.5 km

1. Johan van der Velde in 3h48'59"
2. Teun van Vliet
3. Adriano Baffi at 7"
4. Marc Sergeant
5. Erik Pedersen
6. Christophe Lavainne
7. Jean-Claude Leclercq
8. Stefano Colage
9. Steven Rooks
10. Acácio da Silva

=== Stage 4 ===
Basel/Birsfelden, 25 km ITT

1. Dietrich Thurau in 30'59"
2. Tony Rominger at 7"
3. Erich Maechler at 14"
4. Alan Peiper at 27"
5. Stephan Joho at 51"
6. Gerard Veldscholten at 56"
7. Andrew Hampsten at 57"
8. Guido Winterberg at 58"
9. Eric Vanderaerden at 1'01"
10. Steven Rooks

=== Stage 5 ===
Basel-Brügg bei Biel, 129.5 km

1. Teun van Vliet in 3h19'59"
2. Ron Kiefel
3. Bruno Leali
4. Gert-Jan Theunisse
5. Guido Winterberg at 3"
6. Walter Magagno at 19"
7. Stephen Hodge
8. Valerio Piva at 50"
9. Marco Bergamo at 1'01"
10. Markus Eberli

=== Stage 6 ===
Brügg bei Biel-Täsch, 265.5 km

1. Marco Giovannetti in 6h52'58"
2. Fabio Parra at 20"
3. Jonas Tegstroem at 1'19"
4. Stephen Hodge at 1'45"
5. Claudio Vandelli
6. Andreas Kappes at 1'48"
7. Erich Maechler
8. Enrico Pocchini at 1'54"
9. Johan Van de Velde
10. Stephan Mutter

=== Stage 7 ===
Täsch-Cademario, 211.5 km

1. Peter Winnen in 5h16'20"
2. Fabio Parra at 20"
3. Alessandro Paganessi
4. Johan van der Velde at 1'29"
5. Charly Mottet at 1'57"
6. Rafael Acevedo at 2'11"
7. Andrew Hampsten at 2'12"
8. Acácio da Silva at 2'21"
9. Bernard Gavillet at 2'24"
10. Marco Giovannetti at 2'29"

=== Stage 8 ===
Cademario/Agno-Scuol, 253.5 km

1. Roy Knickmann in 7h08'51"
2. Jeff Pierce at 44"
3. Rocco Cattaneo at 48"
4. John Baldi
5. Daniel Gisiger at 1'33"
6. Claudio Vandelli
7. Giancarlo Perini
8. Valerio Piva
9. Antonio Ferretti
10. Dietrich Thurau

=== Stage 9 ===
Scuol-Laax, 145.5 km

1. Alessandro Paganessi in 3h48'18"
2. Jan Nevens at 12"
3. Heinz Imboden at 1'23"
4. Peter Winnen at 1'31"
5. Alfio Vandi at 1'38"
6. Fabio Parra
7. Andrew Hampsten
8. Jörg Pedersen at 1'42"
9. Acácio da Silva at 1'52"
10. Hubert Seiz

=== Stage 10 ===
Laax-Zürich, 170 km

1. Urs Freuler in 3h48'29"
2. Andreas Kappes
3. Adriano Baffi
4. Stephan Joho
5. Max Hurzeler
6. Marc Sergeant
7. Jörg Müller
8. Daniel Gisiger
9. Pius Schwarzentruber
10. Peter Winnen
