= Alfa Lum =

Team information
- Registered: Italy
- Founded: 1982
- Disbanded: 1990
- Discipline: Road

Team name history
- 1982 1983–1984 1985 1986 1987 1988 1989 1990: Alfa Lum–Sauber; Alfa Lum–Olmo; Alpilatte–Olmo–Cierre; Ecoflam–Jollyscarpe–BFB Bruciatori–Alfa Lum; Ecoflam–BFB Bruciatori–Mareco–Alfa Lum; Alfa Lum–Legnano–Ecoflam; Alfa Lum–STM; Alfa Lum

Alfa Lum was an Italian professional cycling team that existed from 1982 to 1990. The team is best remembered for introducing many successful riders from the former Soviet Union in 1989 and 1990. The team rode in a riding kit of distinctive red and white horizontal stripes. The team sponsored the Italian company of Alfa Lum, an aluminium door and windows manufacturer.

== History ==
The team was formed in 1982 with Alfa Lum as the main sponsor. It was a modest team consisting of mainly Italian riders along with the Australian Micheal Wilson and the Swede Anders Adamsson. In 1983 the team was strengthened considerably as Italian bicycle manufacturers Olmo were brought on board as co-sponsors and Spanish rider Marino Lejarreta who had won the 1982 edition of the Vuelta a España was introduced to the squad as team leader. Marino brought along his brother Ismael to the team. In 1983 Marino Lejarreta finished second in the Vuelta a España for the Alfa Lum-Olmo team, in 1984 the team were invited to ride the Giro d'Italia and Lejarreta finished 4th overall and took a stage win.

Alfa Lum returned as the main sponsor in 1988, taking over from the Ecoflam team when the sponsors pulled out at the end of 1987. The rising star of the team was 23-year-old Maurizio Fondriest who had won a stage of the Volta a Catalunya the previous season and had some good placings in other highly ranked races. Fondriest performed beyond all expectations in 1988 culminating when he surprisingly won the World Championship Road Race in Ronse, Belgium in August. Fondriest also won stages in Tirreno–Adriatico and the Tour de Suisse, as well as the GP Prato for the team that year.

At the end of 1988, Fondriest not unsurprisingly left Alfa Lum to join the Del Tongo team and the rest of the Italians also departed, leaving Alfa Lum to completely rebuild for 1989. They did this by importing fifteen riders from the Soviet Union which had decided to lift its ban on riders turning professional. This turned out to be an inspired action by Alfa Lum as riders such as the veteran Sergei Sukhoruchenkov, the 1980 Olympic road race champion were brought into the squad. However, there were many younger riders who performed admirably and went on to have much success riding for western European teams.

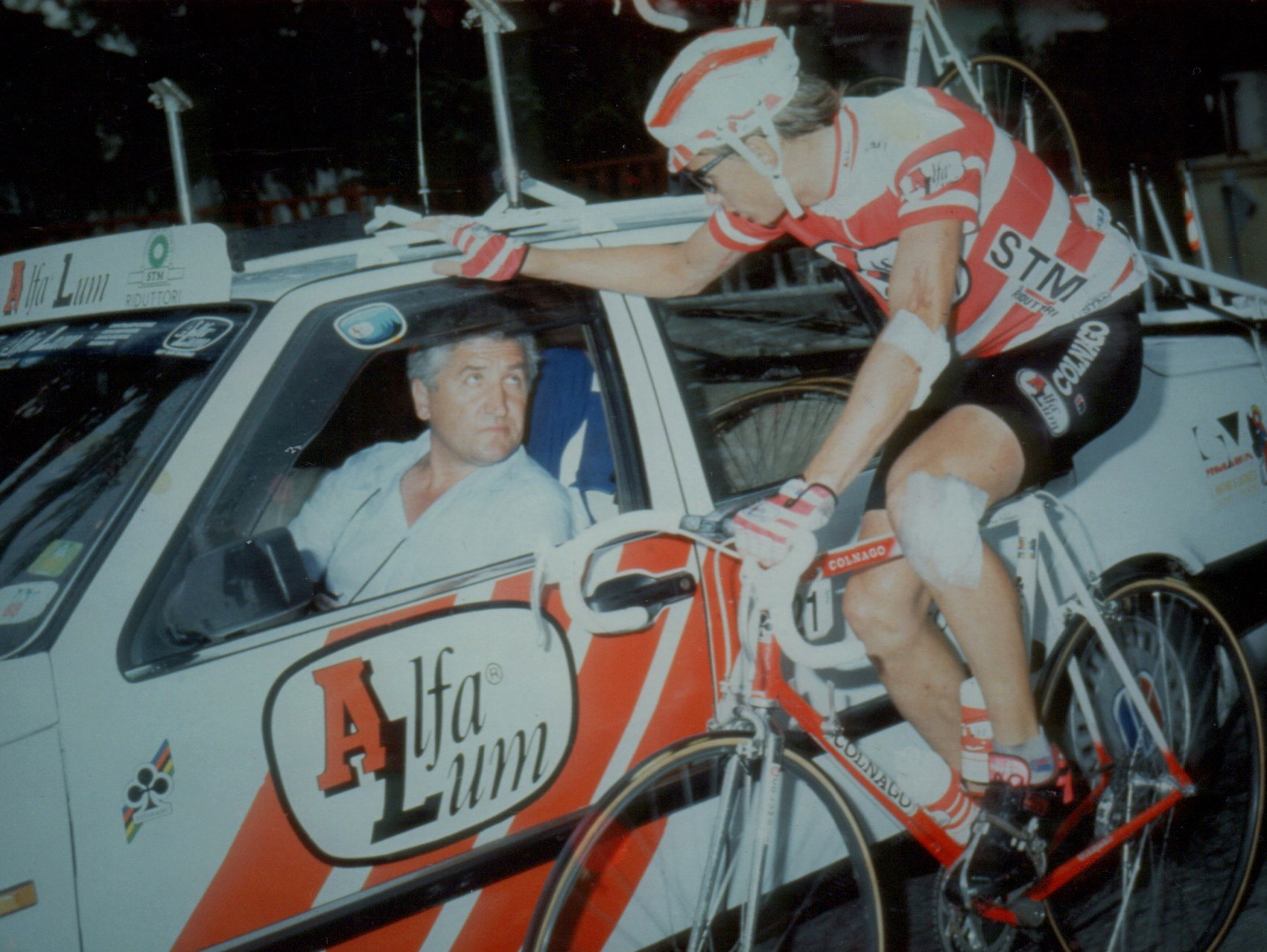
Dimitri Konyshev at the team car in the 1989 Giro d'Italia

The team rode in 1989 and 1990 with it Soviet riders and introduced riders such as Andrei Tchmil, Piotr Ugrumov, Djamolidine Abdoujaparov, Viktor Klimov, Dimitri Konyshev, Vladimir Poulnikov, Ivan Ivanov to the sport. Over the two years the team had much success and surprised the cycling world. Klimov held the leader's jersey for five days in the 1990 Vuelta a Espana. Poulnikov finished fourth overall in the 1990 Giro d’Italia. Asyat Saitov won a stage in the 1990 Vuelta a España, Konyshev finished second in the 1989 UCI Road World Championships road race in Chambéry, France.

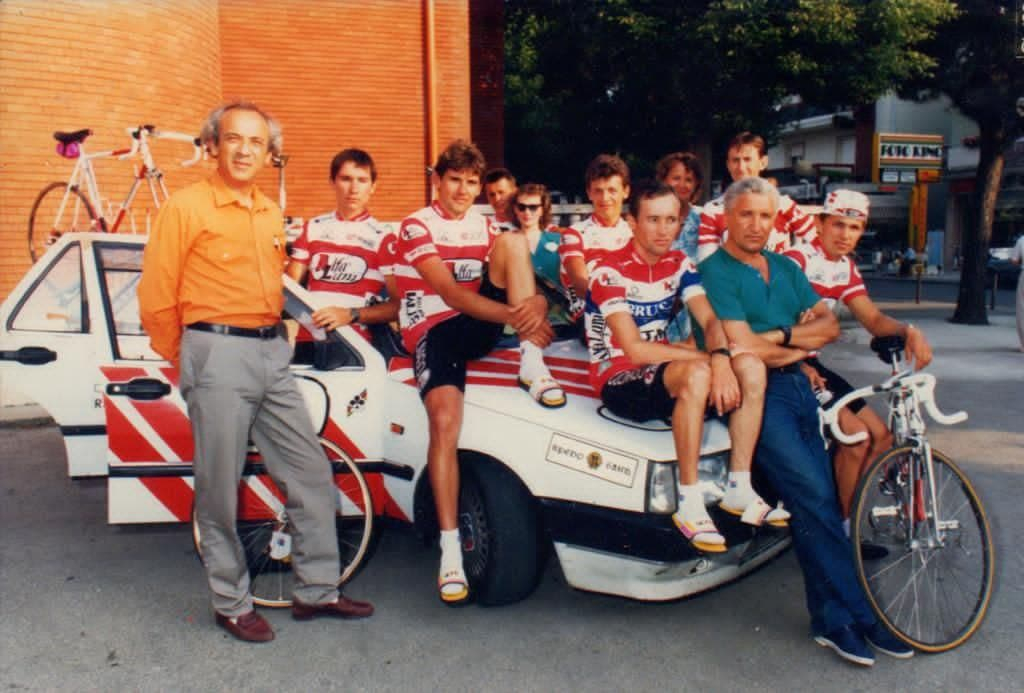
Nikolay Morozov with the team in 1989 or 1990

At the end of 1990 Alfa Lum left cycling sponsorship and the team folded. Many of the riders made moves to bigger teams and had outstanding success in the years to come. Poulnikov and Abdoujaparov moved to Carrera, with “Abdou” taking the Green jersey in the Tour de France in 1991, 1993 and 1994. Ugroumov moved to the Spanish team SEUR along with Klimov and Ivanov, Ugroumov won two Alpine stages in the 1994 Tour de France and finished second to Miguel Indurain in the 1993 Giro d’Italia. Konyshev moved to the Dutch squad TVM and had an outstanding career in one-day races. Andrei Tchmil went to ride for Belgian teams and became one of the top one day riders of the 1990s, winning Paris–Roubaix (1994), Milan–San Remo (1999) and the Tour of Flanders (2000).

== Women's cycling ==
Alfa Lum have been involved in sponsoring women's professional cycling. In the year 2000 the team had Joane Somarriba and Edita Pučinskaitė in the squad as team leaders. Somarriba took the overall at the Grande Boucle while Pučinskaitė took second in the same race. In 2001 Mari Holden joined Somarriba as team leader as Pučinskaitė left. In 2002 Alfa Lum reduced their commitment to women's cycling becoming a co-sponsor and then leaving the sport completely at the end of that season.

== Final roster ==
As of 31 December 1990

Rider	Date of birth
Djamolidine Abdoujaparov (URS)	28 February 1964 (aged 26)
Ouldis Ansons (URS)	19 August 1959 (aged 31)
Konstantin Bankin (URS)	25 July 1962 (aged 28)
Oleg Petrovich Chuzhda (URS)	23 July 1963 (aged 27)
Nikolai Golovatenko (URS)	27 February 1963 (aged 27)
Oleg Iarochenko (URS)	12 October 1962 (aged 28)
Ivan Ivanov (URS)	9 May 1960 (aged 30)
Viktor Klimov (URS)	10 December 1964 (aged 26)
Dimitri Konyshev (URS)	18 February 1966 (aged 24)

Rider	Date of birth
Uladzimir Murauski (URS)	22 September 1959 (aged 31)
Vladimir Poulnikov (URS)	6 June 1965 (aged 25)
Asiat Saitov (URS)	1 January 1965 (aged 25)
Igor Sumnikov (URS)	20 September 1966 (aged 24)
Andrei Tchmil (URS)	22 January 1963 (aged 27)
Alexandre Trubine (URS)	8 June 1966 (aged 24)
Piotr Ugrumov (URS)	21 January 1961 (aged 29)
Sergei Uslamin (URS)	23 February 1963 (aged 27)
Vasily Zhdanov (URS)	12 January 1963 (aged 27)

== Major results ==
1982
Stage 2 Giro d'Italia, Michael Wilson
Prologue & Stage 1 Tour of Sweden, Giuseppe Petito
Stages 3, 4 & 8 Herald Sun Tour, Clyde Sefton
1983
Vuelta a España

Points classification, Marino Lejarreta
Stage 3, Giuseppe Petito
Stages 6, 8 & 13, Marino Lejarreta
Stage 20, Michael Wilson

Giro dell'Appennino, Marino Lejarreta
Overall Escalada a Montjuïc, Marino Lejarreta

Stages 1 & 2, Marino Lejarreta

1984
Trofeo Laigueglia, Giuseppe Petito
Stage 9 Vuelta a España, Orlando Maini
Coppa Cicogna, Romano Randi
GP Citta di Empoli, Marcus Burns
Coppa Varignana, Romano Randi
Stage 19 Giro d'Italia, Marino Lejarreta
Giro delle Valli Aretine, Romano Randi
Trofeo Matteotti, Michael Wilson
1985
Stage 7 Giro d'Italia, Orlando Maini
Coppa Sabatini, Marino Amadori
1986
Stage 2 Tirreno–Adriatico, Daniele Caroli
Stage 1 Tour of the Basque Country, Maurizio Rossi
Stage 8 Giro d'Italia, Franco Chioccioli
Stage 6 Tour de Suisse, Franco Chioccioli
Coppa Ugo Agostoni, Marino Amadori
Coppa Bernocchi, Roberto Gaggioli
Giro del Veneto, Maurizio Rossi
1987
Overall Settimana Internazionale di Coppi e Bartali, Maurizio Rossi

Stage 1, Maurizio Rossi

Trofeo Pantalica, Daniele Caroli
Gran Premio Industria e Commercio di Prato, Daniele Caroli
Coppa della Pace, Daniele Caroli
GP Industria & Artigianato di Larciano, Marino Amadori
Volta a Catalunya

Stage 3, Daniele Caroli
Stage 4, Maurizio Fondriest

1988
Stage 3 Settimana Internazionale di Coppi e Bartali, Camillo Passera
Stage 4 Tirreno–Adriatico, Maurizio Fondriest
Gran Premio Industria e Commercio di Prato, Maurizio Fondriest
Stage 4 Tour de Suisse, Maurizio Fondriest
Criterium d'Abruzzo, Maurizio Fondriest
1989
Stage 1 Vuelta a Cuba, Viktor Klimov
Overall Settimana Ciclistica Lombarda, Ivan Ivanov

Stage 2, Dimitri Konyshev
Stages 4 & 6, Ivan Ivanov
Stage 5, Vladimir Pulnikov

Stage 19 Vuelta a España, Ivan Ivanov
Coppa Agostoni, Dimitri Konyshev
Cronostafetta, Dimitri Konyshev
Giro dell'Emilia, Dimitri Konyshev
Soviet Union National Road race championships, Ivan Ivanov
1990
Stage 6 Settimana Ciclistica Lombarda, Piotr Ugrumov
Stage 20 Vuelta a España, Asiat Saitov
Stage 10 Giro d'Italia, Vladimir Pulnikov
Stage 17 Tour de France, Dimitri Konyshev
GP Industria & Artigianato di Larciano, Dimitri Konyshev
Trofeo della Scalatore, Piotr Ugrumov
Soviet Union National Road race championships, Dimitri Konyshev

=== Supplementary statistics ===
Grand Tours by highest finishing position
Race	1982	1983	1984	1985	1986	1987	1988	1989	1990
Vuelta a España	–	2	26	–	–	–	–	6	8
Giro d'Italia	43	6	4	5	6	9	26	11	4
Tour de France	–	–	–	–	–	–	–	–	25
Major week-long stage races by highest finishing position
Race	1982	1983	1984	1985	1986	1987	1988	1989	1990
Paris–Nice	–	–	–	–	–	–	–	–	–
/ Tirreno–Adriatico	13	6	6	13	–	10	6	15	25
Volta a Catalunya	–	–	–	–	–	–	–	–	–
Tour of the Basque Country	–	3	3	3	2	–	–	–	–
Giro del Trentino	–	–	–	6	–	–	18	17	2
Tour de Romandie	–	–	–	–	–	–	–	–	–
Critérium du Dauphiné	–	–	–	–	–	–	–	–	–
Tour de Suisse	–	–	–	–	5	–	37	–	–
Tour de Pologne	–	–	–	–	–	–	–	–	–
Ronde van Nederland	–	–	–	–	–	–	–	–	–
Monument races by highest finishing position
Race	1982	1983	1984	1985	1986	1987	1988	1989	1990
Milan–San Remo	59	39	55	33	41	22	2	–	–
Tour of Flanders	–	–	18	–	–	–	76	–	79
Paris–Roubaix	–	–	–	–	–	–	17	–	52
Liège–Bastogne–Liège	–	–	–	–	–	–	–	–	57
Giro di Lombardia	14	11	21	4	20	11	16	–	39
Classics by highest finishing position
Classic	1982	1983	1984	1985	1986	1987	1988	1989	1990
Omloop Het Volk	–	–	–	–	NH	–	–	–	–
Kuurne–Brussels–Kuurne	–	–	–	–	NH	–	–	–	–
E3 Harelbeke	–	–	–	–	–	–	–	–	33
Gent–Wevelgem	–	–	60	–	–	49	–	–	8
Amstel Gold Race	–	–	–	–	–	–	–	–	23
La Flèche Wallonne	–	–	–	–	–	–	–	–	–
Clásica de San Sebastián	–	–	–	–	–	–	–	–	–
Paris–Tours	–	–	–	–	–	3	–	–	–

== National and world champions ==
1988
World Road Race, Maurizio Fondriest
1989
Soviet Union Road race, Ivan Ivanov
1990
Soviet Union Road race, Dimitri Konyshev
