= Juan Carlos Arias Acosta =

Colombian cyclist (born 1964)

Personal information
- Nickname: Machete
- Born: December 3, 1964 (age 61) Pereira, Risaralda, Colombia
- Height: 5 ft 10 in (1.78 m)
- Weight: 176 lb (80 kg)

Cycling career
- Sport: Cycling
- Discipline: Road
- Role: Rider
- Rider type: Road and mountain biking

Professional teams
- 1989–1990: Café de Colombia
- 1991: Pony Malta–Avianca

Juan Carlos Arias Acosta (born December 3, 1964) a.k.a "Machete" is a two-time Olympian cyclist from Pereira, Colombia. Arias is a Pan American Champion, who has raced in the Giro d'Italia and the UCI Road World Championships, among other events.

Juan Carlos Arias is the only Colombian athlete to date to represent the country in two different sports in the Olympics. Juan Carlos Arias has been riding since 1982 out of Colombia S.A. and currently resides in Atlanta, Georgia with his family and children. Prior to becoming a professional cyclist, Juan Carlos Arias played soccer for Maracaneiro Football Club in Bogotá, Colombia.

== Teams ==
Year	Team
1984	Selección Colombia Ruta (Colombia)
1985	Laboratorios Gen-far, Selección Colombia Ruta (Colombia)
1986	Ferreterīa Reina, Selección Colombia Ruta (Colombia)
1987	Equipo Olimpico Pilas Varta, Selección Colombia Ruta (Colombia)
1988	Selección Olympica Colombia Ruta (Colombia)
1989	Café de Colombia - Mavic (Colombia)
1990	Café de Colombia (Colombia)
1991	Pony Malta - Avianca, Selección Colombia (Colombia)
1993	Rust-Oleum (Colombia)
1994	Equipo Postobón MTB, Selección Colombia MTB (Colombia)
1995	Equipo Bike House, Selección Colombia MTB (Colombia)
1996	Selección Olympica Colombia MTB (Colombia)
1997	Equipo BikeHouse (Colombia)
2012	Ford - Lifetime Bikes (Atlanta, Georgia, US)

== Accolades ==
- 1984 - Road Champion Colombia
- 1985 - Champion Trinidad & Togabo Classic
- 1987 - Pan-American Games Route Champion
- 1987 - Champion Tour of Guadeloupe, France
- 1987 - Sub-Champion Giro de Veneto, Italy
- 1987 - Vuelta de Malaga, Spain, Sub-Champion (Ganador de Etapa y de la Montaña)
- 1988 - 31st in Olympic Games, Road, Amateurs, Tongillo Road, Seoul
- 1991 - National Championship, Road, Elite, Colombia
- 1996 - Placed 34 in Olympic Games in Atlanta, United States
- 2015 - Champion Georgia State Road Race, United States
- 2017 - Sub Champion Grand Fondo, New York, United States
- 2017 - Champion Georgia State Road Race, United States

== Achievements ==
- 1984 – Departmental Champion Cundinamarca
- 1985 – Champion Tour Trinidad and Tobago
- 1986 – Colombian National Route Champion
- 1986 – Placed 27 in Colorado Spring Route World Championship
- 1987 – Pan-American Route Champion
- 1987 – Second place in Giro de Venneto – Italy- winner of one stage and of the mountain
- 1987 – Winner of the Regularity, winner of one stage and sub-champion of the Tour of Malaga in Spain
- 1987 – Champion of the Tour of Guadalupe
- 1987 – Champion of the regularity and of the bonus sprint in the Tour of Colombia
- 1987 – Sub-champion of the bonus sprint in classic RCN
- 1987 – Placed 17 in the world championship of the route in Austria
- 1988 – Placed 31 in the Olympic Games in Seoul – Korea
- 1988 – Sub-champion of the Tour de Malaga in Spain
- 1988 – National route Sub-Champion of Colombia
- 1989 – Placed 41 in Tour de Spain
- 1989 – Placed 71 Giro de Italy
- 1989 – Placed 17 and sub-champion of the mountain of the week in Catalana in Spain
- 1989 – champion of the "Clasica Roldanillo" – Colombia
- 1990 – Participation Tour de Spain
- 1990 – Participation Giro de Italy
- 1990 – Placed 16 in the race "Paris NLZA" in France
- 1990 – Champion of the regularity and of the bonus sprint in the Tour of Colombia
- 1990 – Champion of the bonus sprint in "El Classico RCN" and subchampion of the regularity in Colombia
- 1991 – Participation in the Giro de Italy
- 1991 – Sub-champion Profesional of route
- 1991 – Champion of the regularity and winner of two stages in LAS "Clasicas de Boyaca and Cundinmarca"
- 1991 – Placed 21 in the "Tour do Portugal"
- 1992 – Sub-champion of the regularity in the Tour a Colombia and ninth place in the general
- 1993 – Sub-champion of Yardley Gold of mountain biking and winner of 1 Valida
- 1994 – Champion national of mountain biking, winner of 3 Validas of the championship and champion of the Yardley Gold tournament
- 1994 – Placed 41 in the world championship of mountain biking in Colorado (US), best Colombian
- 1995 – Third in the national championship of mountain biking and sub-champion of the Yardley Gold tournament
- 1995 – Placed 71 in the world championship and best Colombian
- 1995 – Placed 10 in the Latin-American championship of mountain biking in Cordoba (Argentina)
- 1995 – Champion of the rally totoritas in Lima (Peru) of mountain biking
- 1996 – National champion of mountain biking in "Producciones Tournament" world championship of mountain biking, winner of 3 stages
- 1996 – Placed 34 in Olympic Games in Atlanta US
- 1996 – Fourth place in "Bolivarianos of Quito" Ecuador
- 1996 – Subchampion of the "Rally Totoritas in Lima" – Peru
- 1997 – Fourth place in the Pan-American Championship in Santiago de Chile
- 1997 – Subchampion Latin American mountain biking
- 1997 – National subchampion of mountain biking cross-country – Colombia
- 1997 – Winner of 3 stages of the national championship and 4 place in championship
- 1997 – Champion of the "Rally de Totoritas in Lima"- Peru
- 1997 – Champion of one "Valida Copa Norva" in U.S.
- 1997 – Second place "Valida Copa Norva" IN U.S.
- 1997 – Placed 30 in "Parada de Copa" of the world U.S.
- 1998 – Subchampion of the super mountain bike in Chile
- 1998 – Subchampion tour of "Volcan Villa Rica" – Chile
- 1998 – Second in championship national cross country of mountain biking for stages – Colombia
- 1998 – 10th place in Pan-American Toluca - Mexico
- 1998 – 3 place in Rally Totoritas - Peru
- 2000 – 5 place in Championship Pan-American in Puerto Rico
- 2000 – 3 place in Championship National per stage cross country - Colombia
- 2015 - Champion Georgia State Road Race, United States
- 2017 - Sub Champion Grand Fondo, New York, United States
- 2017 - Champion Georgia State Road Race, United States
