= Settimana Ciclistica Lombarda =

Race details
- Date: Early April
- Region: Lombardy, Italy
- English name: Lombardic Cycling Week
- Local name(s): Settimana Ciclistica Lombarda (in Italian)
- Discipline: Road race
- Type: Stage race
- Web site: www.settimanaciclisticalombarda.it

History
- First edition: 1970
- Editions: 42
- Final edition: 2013
- First winner: Giuliano Marcuzzi (ITA)
- Most wins: Pavel Tonkov (RUS) (3 wins)
- Final winner: Patrik Sinkewitz (GER)

The Settimana Ciclistica Lombarda (English: Lombardic Cycling Week) was an Italian cycle road race. In 2007, the race was organised as a 2.1 event on the UCI Europe Tour, previously being a 2.2 race. It was previously known as Giro Ciclistico Bergamasco and Settimana Ciclistica Bergamasca.

While usually held in the Spring, the 2011 edition was held in late August. The 2012 edition was cancelled after several sponsors withdrew. When the race returned to the Europe Tour calendar in 2013, it was held in September. That was the last edition of the race.

It was announced that the race could be back in 2024.

== List of winners ==
Year	Country	Rider	Team
1970	Italy	Giuliano Marcuzzi	
1971	Czechoslovakia	Rudolf Labus	
1972	Italy	Fausto Bertoglio	
1973	Czechoslovakia	Jiří Mainuš	
1974	Italy	Stanisław Szozda	
1975	Soviet Union	Valeri Chaplygin	
1976	Italy	Vittorio Algeri	
1977	Poland	Janusz Bienek	
1978	Italy	Alessandro Pozzi	
1979	Italy	Alberto Minetti	
1980	Poland	Czesław Lang	
1981	Italy	Alessandro Fedrigo	
1982	Czechoslovakia	Vladimir Kozarek	
1983	Poland	Andrej Serediuk	
1984	Italy	Flavio Giupponi	
1985	Soviet Union	Yury Kashirin	
1986	Poland	Zenon Jaskuła	
1987	Soviet Union	Vladimir Pulnikov	
1988	No race		
1989	Soviet Union	Ivan Ivanov	Alfa Lum–STM
1990	Soviet Union	Nikolai Golovatenko	Alfa Lum
1991	United States	Lance Armstrong	United States men's national cycling team
1992	Russia	Pavel Tonkov	Russ–Baikal
1993	Italy	Enrico Zaina	Mercatone Uno–Zucchini–Medeghini
1994	Italy	Wladimir Belli	Lampre–Panaria
1995	Italy	Massimiliano Lelli	Mercatone Uno–Saeco
1996	Russia	Pavel Tonkov	Scrigno–Blue Storm
1997	Italy	Emanuele Lupi	Amore & Vita–ForzArcore
1998	Russia	Pavel Tonkov	Mapei–Bricobi
1999	Lithuania	Raimondas Rumšas	Mróz
2000	Ukraine	Serhiy Honchar	Liquigas–Pata
2001	Ukraine	Serhiy Honchar	Liquigas–Pata
2002	Slovenia	Tadej Valjavec	Fassa Bortolo
2003	Mexico	Julio Alberto Pérez	Panaria–Fiordo
2004	Italy	Michele Scarponi	Domina Vacanze
2005	Italy	Riccardo Riccò	Grassi–Marco Pantani
2006	Netherlands	Robert Gesink	Rabobank Continental Team
2007	Russia	Alexander Efimkin	Barloworld
2008	Italy	Danilo Di Luca	LPR Brakes–Ballan
2009	Italy	Daniele Pietropolli	LPR Brakes–Farnese Vini
2010	Italy	Michele Scarponi	Androni Giocattoli
2011	France	Thibaut Pinot	FDJ
2012	No race		
2013	Germany	Patrik Sinkewitz	Meridiana–Kamen
