= Maurizio Rossi (cyclist) =

Personal information
- Born: 20 December 1962 (age 63) Forlì, Italy

Cycling career
- Sport: Cycling
- Current team: Retired
- Discipline: Road
- Role: Rider

Amateur team
- 1982–1984: Lambrusco Giacobazzi

Professional teams
- 1984–1988: Alfa Lum–Olmo
- 1989–1990: Jolly Componibili–Club 88

Maurizio Rossi (born 20 December 1962) is an Italian former road cyclist who competed as a professional from 1984 to 1990.

== Career ==
Rossi almost won the 1986 Tour of the Basque Country, after winning the first stage in a solo victory 3:40 ahead of the peloton. He held the lead all the way to the last stage, which was an eighteen-kilometre individual time trial. Irish cyclist Sean Kelly finished the time trial 3:58 ahead of Rossi, therefore taking the final victory by eighteen seconds over Rossi, who still managed to finish second.

During his career, Rossi also won the Giro del Veneto in 1986 as well as the overall classification and a stage of the 1987 Settimana Internazionale di Coppi e Bartali.

== Major results ==
1983
1st Trofeo Papà Cervi
1985
7th Giro di Toscana
1986
1st Giro del Veneto
2nd Overall Tour of the Basque Country

1st Stage 1

5th Giro del Lazio
7th Coppa Sabatini
1987
1st Overall Settimana Internazionale di Coppi e Bartali

1st Stage 2

2nd Giro di Campania
1989
3rd Gran Premio Industria e Commercio di Prato

=== Grand Tour general classification results timeline ===
Grand Tour	1985	1986	1987	1988	1989	1990
Giro d'Italia	102	73	89	DNF	43	55
Tour de France	—	—	—	—	—	—
Vuelta a España	—	—	—	—	—	87
