= Darius Kaiser =

German cyclist

Personal information
- Full name: Dariusz Kajzer
- Born: 15 October 1961 (age 65) Tychowo, Poland
- Died: 11 February 2026 Poland, Bydgoszcz

Cycling career
- Sport: Cycling
- Discipline: Road
- Role: Rider

Professional team
- 1989–1991: Stuttgart–Merckx–Gonsor

Major wins
- One-Day Races and Classics National Road Race Championships (1989)

Darius Kaiser (born 15 October 1961) is a Polish-born German racing cyclist. He won the German National Road Race in 1989.

== Major results ==
1985
1st Stage 5 Tour de Pologne
1986
9th Overall Tour de Pologne
1989
1st Road race, National Road Championships
1st Dekra Open Stuttgart Sprint classification

1st Stage 1

2nd Overall Tour de Luxembourg

1st Mountain classification

1990
2nd Road race, National Road Championships
6th Tour du Haut Var
7th GP Cannes
10th Overall Dekra Open Stuttgart

Grand Tour	1986	1987	1988	1989	1990	1991
Vuelta a España	97	–	–	–	26	73
Giro d'Italia	Did not Race					
Tour de France	Did not Race					
