= Viktor Klimov =

Soviet cyclist

Personal information
- Born: 10 December 1964 (age 61) Simferopol, Ukrainian SSR, Soviet Union

Cycling career
- Sport: Cycling
- Current team: Retired
- Discipline: Road
- Role: Rider

Professional teams
- 1990: Alfa Lum
- 1991–1992: Seur–Otero
- 1993: Deportpublic

Viktor Klimov (born 10 December 1964) is a Soviet and Ukrainian former cyclist. He competed in the team time trial at the 1988 Summer Olympics.

== Major results ==
1984
1st Team time trial, Soviet National Road Championships
2nd Overall Tour of Bulgaria
1985
1st Team time trial, UCI Road World Championships
1st Stage 2 (TTT) Peace Race
2nd Overall Settimana Ciclistica Bergamasca

1st Stage 1

1986
1st Team time trial, Soviet National Road Championships
1st Stage 3 (TTT) Peace Race
1987
Soviet National Road Championships

1st Duo time trial (with Vasily Zhdanov)
1st Team time trial

2nd Team time trial, UCI Road World Championships
2nd Overall Settimana Ciclistica Bergamasca

1st Stage 2

1988
1st Team time trial, Soviet National Road Championships
1989
Soviet National Road Championships

1st Road race
1st Team time trial

1st Stage 1 Vuelta a Cuba
3rd Team time trial, UCI Road World Championships
1990
5th Firenze–Pistoia
1991
1st Overall Troféu Joaquim Agostinho
1st Memorial Manuel Galera
1st Stage 4 Paris–Nice
1st Stage 5 Tour of Galicia
3rd Trofeo Comunidad Foral de Navarra
7th Overall Vuelta a los Valles Mineros
7th Grand Prix La Marseillaise
1992
3rd Overall Vuelta a La Rioja
3rd Trofeo Comunidad Foral de Navarra
1993
3rd Memorial Manuel Galera

=== Grand Tour general classification results timeline ===
Grand Tour	1990	1991	1992	1993
Giro d'Italia	103	34	67	—
Tour de France	—	—	—	—
Vuelta a España	DNF	DNF	100	36
