= José Martín Farfán =

Colombian cyclist

Personal information
- Full name: José Martín Farfán Pulido
- Nickname: Farfantastico
- Born: 21 August 1965 (age 61) Facatativá, Cundinamarca, Colombia

Cycling career
- Sport: Cycling
- Discipline: Road
- Role: Rider

Professional teams
- 1988–1989: Café de Colombia
- 1990–1993: Kelme–Ibexpress
- 1994: Postobón–Manzana
- 1995: Kelme–Sureña

Major wins
- Grand Tours Vuelta a España Mountains classification (1990) 1 individual stage (1990)

José Martín Farfán Pulido (born 21 August 1965) is a Colombian former road cyclist, who was a professional from 1988 to 1995. He was nicknamed Farfantastico during his career. Farfán is one of only 4 Colombians to win the Mountain jersey at the Vuelta a España.

== Career ==
In the 1989 Vuelta a España while racing the Stage 15 Time trial Farfán finished in third this was enough to put him into the lead of the race by 2 seconds to eventual winner Pedro Delgado. Farfán's biggest win of his career was Stage 18 of the 1990 Vuelta a España which he won ahead of teammate and fellow Colombian Fabio Parra. This victory would move Farfán up to 6th overall, he would lose time in the remaining stages to finish eleventh at the end of the Vuelta. He did end up winning the Mountains classification for most mountain points that year.

== Major results ==
1987
2nd Overall Vuelta de la Juventud de Colombia
1988
4th Overall Vuelta al Táchira

1st Stage 2b

1989
1st Stage 3 Clásico RCN
Vuelta a España

Wore after Stage 15

1990
Vuelta a España

1st Mountains classification
1st Stage 18

7th Overall Vuelta a Colombia
1991
3rd Overall Vuelta a Burgos
3rd Overall Vuelta a Colombia

1st Combination classification
1st Stage 6

9th Overall Critérium du Dauphiné Libéré
9th Overall Tour of Galicia
1992
1st Stage 8 Vuelta a Colombia
1st Stage 2 Vuelta a Burgos
4th Overall Vuelta a Boyacá
8th Overall Critérium du Dauphiné Libéré

1st Stage 6

10th Overall Vuelta a Burgos
1993
5th Clásica de Almería
10th Overall Vuelta a Murcia
1994
1st Overall Vuelta al Tolima
2nd Overall Clásico RCN

1st Stage 2

1995
1st Mountains classification, Clásico RCN

=== Grand Tour general classification results timeline ===
Grand Tour	1989	1990	1991	1992	1993	1994	1995
Vuelta a España	23	11	53	38	40	—	DNF
Giro d'Italia	—	—	—	—	DNF	—	49
Tour de France	—	DNF	—	—	—	—	—

Legend
—	Did not compete
DNF	Did not finish
