= Marek Kulas =

Polish cyclist

Personal information
- Born: 6 July 1963 (age 63) Kościerzyna, Poland

Cycling career
- Sport: Cycling
- Discipline: Road
- Role: Rider

Professional teams
- 1989: Exbud
- 1990: Diana–Colnago–Animex
- 1991–1992: La William–Saltos

Marek Kulas (born 6 July 1963) is a Polish former racing cyclist. He won the Tour de Pologne in 1986. He also rode in the 1990 Vuelta a España, placing second on stage 2a.

== Major results ==
1986
1st Overall Tour de Pologne
1989
4th Overall Tour du Limousin
10th Overall Grand Prix du Midi Libre
1990
7th Overall Three Days of De Panne
1991
2nd Overall Paris–Bourges
6th Tour du Nord-Ouest
10th Grand Prix Cerami
1992
1st Stage 1 Herald Sun Tour
1st Stage 2 Niederösterreich-Rundfahrt
6th Grand Prix de Wallonie
7th Druivenkoers Overijse
10th Grand Prix d'Isbergues
