= Néstor Mora =

Colombian cyclist (1963–1995)

- Mora with Kelme

Personal information
- Born: 20 September 1963 Bogotá, Colombia
- Died: 20 February 1995 (aged 31) Manizales, Colombia

Cycling career
- Sport: Cycling
- Discipline: Road
- Role: Rider

Professional teams
- 1985: Varta–Café de Colombia–Mavic
- 1986–1988: Postobón–Manzana
- 1989–1994: Kelme
- 1995: Postobón–Manzana

Néstor Oswaldo Mora Zárate (20 September 1963 – 20 February 1995) was a racing cyclist from Colombia, who represented his native country in the individual road race at the 1984 Summer Olympics in Los Angeles.

Mora was born in Bogotá. He was a professional from 1985 to 1995, most notably winning a stage of the 1990 Vuelta a España. He died in 1995, aged 31, when he was hit by a truck in Manizales while training.

== Major results ==
1984
1st Road race, National Road Championships
8th Road race, Summer Olympics
1986
7th Overall Route du Sud
1987
1st Stage 2 Vuelta a Colombia
1st Stage 9 Clásico RCN
1988
1st Stage 10 Vuelta a Colombia
1990
1st Stage 9 Vuelta a España
1st Stage 2 Vuelta a Colombia
1991
1st Clásica de Cundinamarca
1st Clásica de Boyacá
1st Stages 1 & 3 Setmana Catalana de Ciclisme
1st Stages 3 & 13 Vuelta a Colombia
1992
1st Clásica a los Puertos
1993
1st Stage 10 Vuelta a Colombia
1st Stage 5 Clásico RCN
3rd Road race, National Road Championships

=== Grand Tour general classification results timeline ===
Grand Tour	1985	1986	1987	1988	1989	1990	1991	1992	1993	1994
Giro d'Italia	67	—	—	—	—	—	—	—	37	71
Tour de France	118	83	63	—	—	86	—	—	—	—
Vuelta a España	—	23	21	42	46	42	29	35	33	60

== See also ==
- List of racing cyclists and pacemakers with a cycling-related death
