= Luis Javier Lukin =

Spanish cyclist

Personal information
- Born: 5 August 1963 (age 63) Oteiza, Spain

Cycling career
- Sport: Cycling
- Current team: Retired
- Discipline: Road
- Role: Rider

Professional teams
- 1986–1987: Kas
- 1988–1992: Reynolds

Luis Javier Lukin (born 5 August 1963) is a former Spanish racing cyclist. He rode in twelve Grand Tours between 1986 and 1992.

== Major results ==
1987
3rd Overall Vuelta a Cantabria

=== Grand Tour general classification results timeline ===
Grand Tour	1986	1987	1988	1989	1990	1991	1992
Giro d'Italia	—	—	32	—	—	—	77
Tour de France	—	DNF	82	56	DNF	119	—
Vuelta a España	55	52	60	73	49	—	—

Legend
—	Did not compete
DNF	Did not finish
