= Emilio Cuadrado =

Spanish cyclist (born 1964)

Personal information
- Full name: José Emilio Cuadrado Taravillo
- Born: 18 August 1964 (age 62) Onil, Spain

Cycling career
- Sport: Cycling
- Discipline: Road
- Role: Rider

Professional team
- 1989–1992: Puertas Mavisa

Major wins
- Grand Tours Vuelta a España 1 individual stage (1990)

José Emilio Cuadrado Taravillo (born 18 August 1964) is a Spanish former racing cyclist. Professional from 1989 to 1992, he won stage 2a of the 1990 Vuelta a España.
