= Bernd Gröne =

German cyclist

Personal information
- Born: 19 February 1963 (age 63) Recklinghausen, North Rhine-Westphalia, West Germany

Cycling career
- Sport: Cycling
- Current team: Retired
- Discipline: Road
- Role: Rider

Professional team
- 1989–1995: Stuttgart–Merckx–Gonsor

Major wins
- Grand Tours Vuelta a España 1 individual stage (1990) One-Day Races and Classics National Road Race Championships (1993)
Medal record
Men's cycling
Representing West Germany
Olympic Games
Silver medal – second place	1988 Seoul	Individual Road Race

Bernd Gröne (born 19 February 1963) is a retired road racing cyclist from Germany, who won the silver medal for West Germany in the men's individual road race at the 1988 Summer Olympics in Seoul, South Korea. He was a professional rider from 1989 to 1995. He won the German National Road Race in 1993.

== Major results ==
1986
1st Stage 7 GP Tell
1987
2nd Gran Premio della Liberazione
1988
1st Gran Premio della Liberazione
2nd Road race, Olympic Games
1990
1st Stage 14 Vuelta a España
1993
1st Road race, National Road Championships

Grand Tour	1990	1991	1992	1993
Giro d'Italia	–	–	144	DNF
Tour de France	–	–	DNF	–
Vuelta a España	121	DNF	–	–
