= Daniele Caroli =

Italian cyclist

Personal information
- Born: 10 January 1959 (age 67) Faenza, Italy

Cycling career
- Sport: Cycling
- Role: Rider

Daniele Caroli (born 10 January 1959) is an Italian former professional racing cyclist. He rode in one edition of the Tour de France, three editions of the Giro d'Italia and one edition of the Vuelta a España.
