= Giuseppe Calcaterra =

Italian cyclist

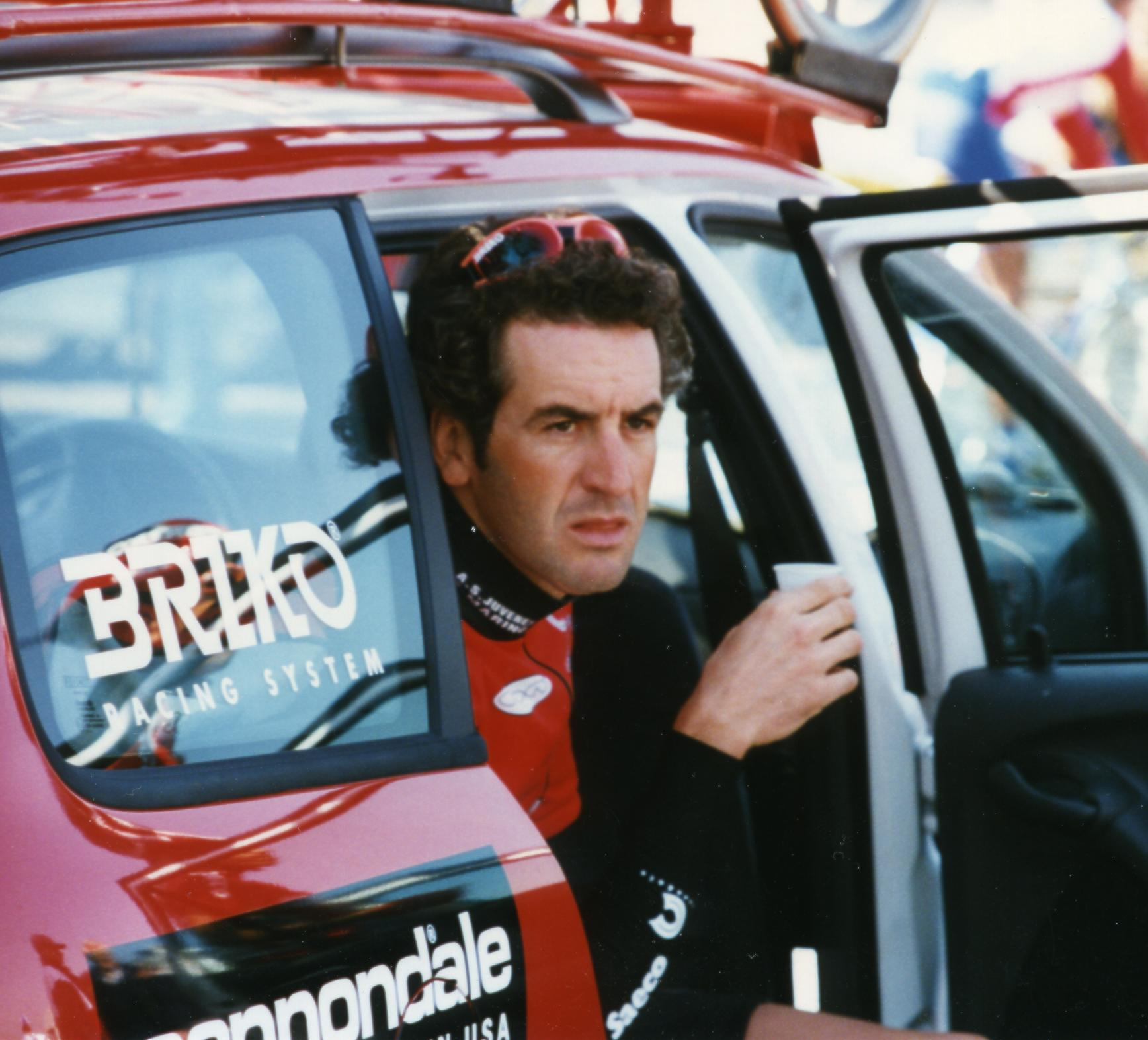

Personal information
- Full name: Giuseppe Calcaterra
- Born: 9 December 1964 (age 61) Cuggiono, Italy

Cycling career
- Sport: Cycling
- Discipline: Road
- Role: Rider

Professional teams
- 1985–1989: Atala
- 1990–1991: Chateau d'Ax–Salotti
- 1992–1994: Amore & Vita–Fanini
- 1995: Mercatone Uno–Saeco
- 1996–2001: Saeco–AS Juvenes San Marino

Major wins
- Giro d'Italia, 1 stage (1987); Vuelta a España, 1 stage (1994); Nice–Alassio (1987); Giro dell'Appennino (1993); Giro di Puglia (1993)

Giuseppe Calcaterra (born 9 December 1964) is an Italian racing cyclist.

His name was on the list of doping tests published by the French Senate on 24 July 2013 that were collected during the 1998 Tour de France and found suspicious for EPO when retested in 2004.

== Major results ==
1985
5th Firenze–Pistoia
1986
2nd Trofeo Laigueglia
9th Giro di Romagna
10th Tre Valli Varesine
1987
1st Stage 18 Giro d'Italia
1st Stage 6 Settimana Internazionale di Coppi e Bartali
1st Nice-Alassio
2nd Overall Tirreno–Adriatico
5th Milan–San Remo
1988
6th Milan–San Remo
6th Trofeo Laigueglia
10th Tour of Flanders
1989
9th Milan–San Remo
1990
1st Stage 4 GP du Midi-Libre
1992
9th G.P. Camaiore
1993
1st Overall Giro di Puglia

1st Stage 2

1st Giro dell'Appennino
8th G.P. Camaiore
9th Giro di Romagna
1994
1st Stage 18 Vuelta a España
1st Stage 3 Tour of Sweden
4th Nice-Alassio
1997
10th Gent–Wevelgem
