= Erwin Nijboer =

Dutch cyclist

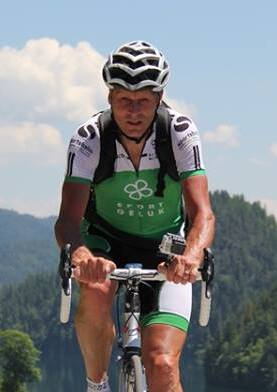

Personal information
- Full name: Erwin Nijboer
- Born: 2 June 1964 (age 62) Denekamp, Netherlands

Cycling career
- Sport: Cycling
- Current team: Retired
- Discipline: Road
- Role: Rider

Amateur team
- 1983: Amstel Bier

Professional teams
- 1985–1989: Seat–Orbea
- 1990–1991: Stuttgart–Mercedes–Merckx–Puma
- 1992–1993: Artiach–Royal
- 1994–1996: Banesto

Major wins
- Grand Tours Vuelta a España 1 Individual stage (1990) 1 TTT stage (1989)

Erwin Nijboer (born 2 June 1964) is a former Dutch racing cyclist. He rode in seventeen Grand Tours between 1986 and 1996.

== Major results ==
1986
7th Klasika Primavera
1989
1st Stage 3a TTT Vuelta a España
7th TTT Grand Prix de la Libération
1990
1st Overall Driedaagse van De Panne-Koksijde
1st Stage 4 Vuelta a España
1992
1st Sprint classification Vuelta a Aragón
2nd Porto–Lisboa
1993
1st Stage 5b Vuelta a Murcia
9th Vuelta a los Valles Mineros

Grand Tour	1985	1986	1987	1988	1989	1990	1991	1992	1993	1994	1995	1996
Giro d'Italia	–	–	–	–	–	–	–	–	–	87	103	–
Tour de France	–	DNF	DNF	DNF	DNF	–	–	–	–	99	–	–
Vuelta a España	–	41	DNF	110	138	119	DNF	124	111	–	74	DNF
