= Julio César Cadena =

Colombian cyclist

Personal information
- Full name: Julio César Cadena Villegas
- Born: 29 August 1963 (age 63) Fusagasugá, Colombia

Cycling career
- Sport: Cycling
- Current team: Retired
- Discipline: Road
- Role: Rider

Professional teams
- 1987–1990: Café de Colombia–Varta
- 1991–1994: Kelme–Ibexpress

Julio César Cadena (born 29 August 1963) is a Colombian former racing cyclist. He rode in ten Grand Tours between 1987 and 1994.

== Major results ==
1984
1st Overall Tour de Guadeloupe
1986
1st Overall Ronde de l'Isard
1990
1st Stage 3 GP Internacional de Café
1991
10th Overall Vuelta a Andalucía
1992
1st Stage 10 Vuelta a España

=== Grand Tour general classification results timeline ===
Grand Tour	1987	1988	1989	1990	1991	1992	1993	1994
Vuelta a España	—	57	—	DNF	—	30	—	50
Giro d'Italia	—	—	33	—	—	—	51	—
Tour de France	46	42	76	—	—	—	—	85
