= Nico Emonds =

Belgian cyclist

Personal information
- Born: 4 April 1961 (age 65) Hasselt, Belgium

Cycling career
- Sport: Cycling
- Discipline: Road
- Role: Rider

Professional teams
- 1983: Jacky Aernoudt–Rossin–Campagnolo
- 1984: Teka
- 1985: Fagor
- 1986–1988: Kwantum–Decosol–Yoko
- 1989–1990: Teka
- 1991: CLAS–Cajastur
- 1992: Mercatone Uno–Medeghini–Zucchini
- 1993: Willy Naessens
- 1994: Mapei–CLAS
- 1995–1996: S.E.F.B.–Espace Card

Major wins
- Grand Tours Vuelta a España 1 individual stage (1990) Stage races Tour of Belgium (1986)

Nico Emonds (born 4 April 1961) is a Belgian former professional racing cyclist. Professional from 1983 to 1996, he rode in five editions of the Tour de France, four editions of the Vuelta a España and two editions of the Giro d'Italia. he also took 16 professional wins in his career, including a stage of the 1990 Vuelta a España, the 1986 Tour of Belgium, the 1990 Vuelta a Aragón and the 1988 Binche–Tournai–Binche.
