= Ettore Pastorelli =

Italian cyclist

Personal information
- Born: 24 May 1966 (age 60) Concesio, Italy

Cycling career
- Sport: Cycling
- Discipline: Road
- Role: Rider

Professional teams
- 1988–1989: Carrera Jeans–Vagabond
- 1990: Jolly Componibili–Club 88
- 1991: Gis Gelati–Ballan
- 1992: Mercatone Uno–Medeghini–Zucchini

Major wins
- Grand Tours Vuelta a España 1 individual stage (1988)

Ettore Pastorelli (born 24 May 1966) is an Italian former racing cyclist. Professional from 1988 to 1992, he won the opening stage of the 1988 Vuelta a España, taking the leader's jersey for the following day in the process.

== Major results ==
1988
Vuelta a España

1st Stage 1
Held after Stage 1

1989
4th Trofeo Luis Puig
1990
9th Giro della Provincia di Reggio Calabria
1991
6th Philadelphia International Cycling Classic
1992
1st Stage 6b Vuelta a la Argentina
5th Milano–Vignola
