= Denis Roux =

French cyclist

Personal information
- Born: 5 November 1961 (age 64) Montreuil, Seine-Saint-Denis

Cycling career
- Sport: Cycling
- Current team: Retired
- Discipline: Road
- Role: Rider

Professional teams
- 1984: Coop–Hoonved
- 1985: Renault–Elf–Gitane
- 1986: Système U–Gitane
- 1987–1988: Z
- 1989–1991: La Vie Claire
- 1992: Subaru-Montgomery

Major wins
- 1 stage Vuelta a España (1990)

Denis Roux (born 5 November 1961 in Montreuil) is a former French cyclist.

Roux was professional from 1984 to 1992 and recorded a total of eleven victories including a stage of the Vuelta a España in 1990. He participated in the Tour de France six times. His best result was tenth place in 1988.

After he retired, he became a coach at the Canadian and French Cycling Federation and the sports director of Crédit Agricole. He is married to the French skier Sarah Hemery.

== Major results ==
1983
1st Overall Tour du Vaucluse
1988
1st Critérium de Castillon-la-Bataille
10th Overall Tour de France
1989
2nd Trophée des Grimpeurs
1990
9th Overall Critérium du Dauphiné Libéré
10th Overall Vuelta a España

1st Stage 21

1991
2nd Overall Tour du Limousin
8th GP Ouest France-Plouay

== Grand Tour results ==
=== Tour de France ===
- 1985: 56th
- 1987: 20th
- 1988: 10th
- 1989: DNF
- 1990: 77th
- 1991: 16th

=== Vuelta a España ===
- 1986: DNF
- 1990: 10th (winner of the 21st stage)
