= Uwe Raab =

German cyclist (born 1962)

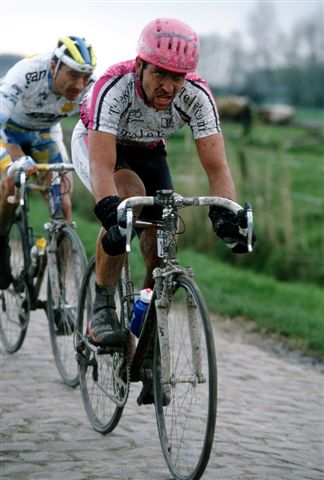
- Raab at the 1994 Paris–Roubaix

Personal information
- Full name: Uwe Raab
- Born: 26 July 1962 (age 64) Wittenberg, East Germany

Cycling career
- Sport: Cycling
- Discipline: Road

Professional teams
- 1990–1992: PDM–Concorde
- 1993–1995: Team Telekom

Major wins
- Grand Tours Vuelta a España Points classification (1990, 1991) 4 individual stages (1990, 1991) One-day races and Classics World Road Race Championships (1983)
Medal record
Representing East Germany
Men's road bicycle racing
World Championships
Gold medal – first place	1983 Altenrhein	Amateur's Road Race
Bronze medal – third place	1986 Colorado Springs	Team time trial

Uwe Raab (born 26 July 1962) is a German former professional cyclist born in Wittenberg, East Germany. He is most known for winning the Points classification in the 1990 and 1991 Vuelta a Españas. He also competed in the road race at the 1988 Summer Olympics.

== Major results ==
1982
Troféu Joaquim Agostinho

1st Stages 3b, 5 & 6a

1st Prologue Tour de l'Avenir
1983
Peace Race

1st Stages 1, 6 & 9

1st Stage 4 Okolo Slovenska
1st Amateur's road race 1983 UCI Road World Championships
1984
1st Stage 1 Peace Race
1985
1st Stage 12 Peace Race
1986
3rd Team time trial 1986 UCI Road World Championships
1987
1st Stage 2 Peace Race
1988
1st Overall DDR Rundfahrt
1989
Peace Race

1st Stages 5 & 8

1st Stage 3 Circuit Cycliste Sarthe
1st Prologue GP Tell
1990
Vuelta a España

1st Points classification
1st Stages 10, 16 & 22

1st Stage 4 Volta a la Comunitat Valenciana
6th Overall Ronde van Nederland
9th Overall Tour of Sweden
1991
Vuelta a España

1st Points classification
1st Stage 5

1st Stage 6 Vuelta a Aragón (ITT)
2nd Dwars door België
3rd E3 Harelbeke
8th Milan–San Remo
10th Overall KBC Driedaagse van De Panne-Koksijde
1992
1st Stage 1 Vuelta a Burgos
1st Stage 3 Settimana Internazionale di Coppi e Bartali
1st Stage 6 Vuelta a Asturias
1st Stage 1a Vuelta a los Valles Mineros
4th Milan–San Remo
6th Gent–Wevelgem
7th Overall KBC Driedaagse van De Panne-Koksijde
1993
1st Stage 6 Tirreno–Adriatico
8th Overall 4 Jours de Dunkerque
10th E3 Harelbeke

Preceded by Bernd Drogan	East German Sportsman of the Year; 1983	Succeeded by Uwe Hohn
