= Fabio Parra =

Colombian cyclist

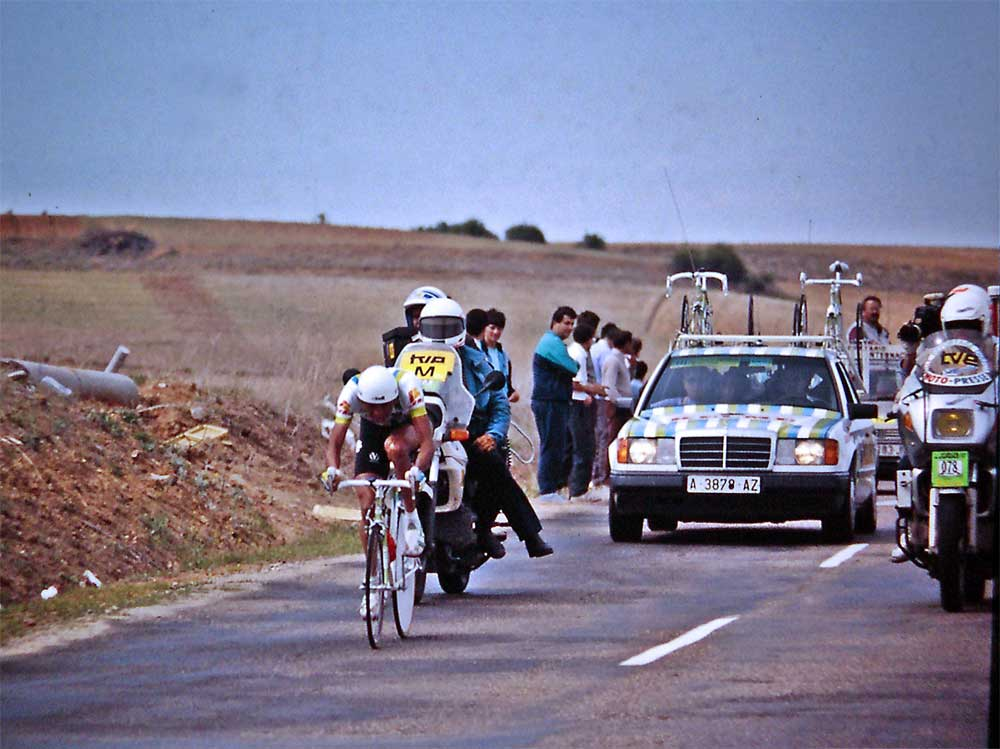
- Parra during the 1989 Vuelta a España

Personal information
- Full name: Fabio Enrique Parra Pinto
- Born: November 22, 1959 (age 66) Sogamoso, Colombia

Cycling career
- Sport: Cycling
- Discipline: Road
- Role: Rider
- Rider type: Climbing specialist

Amateur teams
- 1979–1981: Lotería de Boyacá A
- 1982: Perfumería Yanneth
- 1984: Leche La Gran Vía A

Professional teams
- 1985–1987: Varta–Café de Colombia–Mavic
- 1988–1990: Kelme
- 1991–1992: Amaya Seguros

Major wins
- Grand Tours Tour de France Young rider classification (1985) 2 individual stages (1985, 1988) Vuelta a España 2 individual stages (1988, 1991) Stage races Vuelta a Colombia (1981, 1992) Clásico RCN (1987)

Fabio Enrique Parra Pinto (born November 22, 1959, in Sogamoso, Boyacá) is a retired Colombian road racing cyclist. Parra was successful as an amateur in Colombia, winning the Novatos classification for new riders or riders riding their first edition of the race, and finishing 14th in the 1979 Vuelta a Colombia and then the General classification in the 1981 Vuelta a Colombia. He also competed in the individual road race event at the 1984 Summer Olympics.

Parra turned professional for the first Colombian cycling team, Café de Colombia, in 1985. He was a professional from 1985 to 1992 and won stages in the Tour de France and Vuelta a España. His success occurred at the same time as his compatriot Luis Herrera. While Herrera won stages and the King of the Mountains competitions in the grand tours, Parra could contend for the overall classification. His greatest achievements were a third place in the 1988 Tour de France, highest placing of a South American for 25 years, until his countryman Nairo Quintana finished second in the 2013 Tour de France, and, in the following year in the Vuelta a España, finishing second to Pedro Delgado at 35 seconds.

Fabio Parra has two younger brothers who also became professionals, Humberto Parra Pinto and Iván Parra. Humberto rode for three years for Kelme while Iván won 2 stages of the 2005 Giro d'Italia.

== Career achievements ==
=== Major results ===
1979
1st Novatos New rider classification, Vuelta a Colombia
1980
9th Overall Vuelta a Colombia
1981
1st Overall Vuelta a Colombia
2nd Overall Clásico RCN
1982
2nd Overall Clásico RCN
1984
3rd Overall Vuelta a Colombia
5th Overall Clásico RCN
1985
2nd Overall Vuelta a Colombia

1st Stage 11

5th Overall Vuelta a España
8th Overall Tour de France

Young rider classification
1st Stage 12

1986
8th Overall Vuelta a España
1987
1st Overall Clásico RCN

1st Stages 1 & 6

3rd Overall Tour de Suisse
6th Overall Tour de France
1988
3rd Overall Tour de France

1st Stage 11

4th Overall Vuelta a Colombia
5th Overall Vuelta a España

1st Stage 13

1989
2nd Overall Vuelta a España
2nd Overall Clásico RCN

1st Stage 3

2nd Overall Vuelta a Colombia

1st Stage 10

1990
5th Overall Vuelta a España
5th Overall Critérium du Dauphiné Libéré
1991
5th Overall Vuelta a España

1st Stage 13

6th Overall Vuelta a Colombia
8th GP Cafe de Colombia
1992
1st Overall Vuelta a Colombia

1st Stage 11

7th Overall Vuelta a España

=== Grand Tour general classification results timeline ===
Grand Tour	1985	1986	1987	1988	1989	1990	1991	1992
Vuelta a España	5	8	—	5	2	5	5	7
Giro d'Italia	—	—	—	—	—	—	—	—
Tour de France	8	—	6	3	—	13	—	—

Legend
—	Did not compete
DNF	Did not finish
