= Marco Giovannetti =

Italian cyclist (born 1962)

Personal information
- Full name: Marco Giovannetti
- Born: 4 April 1962 (age 64) Milan, Italy

Cycling career
- Sport: Cycling
- Current team: Retired
- Discipline: Road
- Role: Rider

Professional teams
- 1985: Ariostea
- 1986-1988: Gis Gelati
- 1989-1990: Seur
- 1991-1992: Chateau d'Ax - Gatorade
- 1993-1994: Mapei

Major wins
- 1984 Olympic team road race 1990 Vuelta a España
Medal record
Representing Italy
Men's road bicycle racing
Olympic Games
Gold medal – first place	1984 Los Angeles	Team Road Race

Marco Giovannetti (born 4 April 1962) is an Italian former professional road bicycle racer and Olympic gold medalist who won the Vuelta a España in 1990. He has also won stages at the Tour de Suisse and the Giro d'Italia.

Giovannetti was born in Milan, Italy to a Tuscan family. Early in his career as an amateur, Giovannetti won the gold medal in the Team Road Race at the 1984 Summer Olympics in Los Angeles, California, together with Claudio Vandelli, Marcello Bartalini and Eros Poli.

Giovannetti's overall win in the 1990 Vuelta a España was due to a decisive attack on stage 6 over the Las Palomas mountain range. Although he placed fifth on the stage, his competitors fared worse and Giovannetti moved into second place and by stage 11 he had moved into the lead and eventually defeating the defending champion Pedro Delgado, who finished in second place. He became only the fourth Italian to win the Spanish Grand Tour.

In 1991, Giovannetti finished all three Grand Tours in a single season.

== Career achievements ==
=== Major results ===
1984 – Amateur
Gold Medal, Summer Olympics Men's Team Road Race
1986
Giro d'Italia:

Winner Maglia bianca (youth classification)
8th place overall classification

1987 – GIS Gelati-Jollyscarpe
4th overall and Stage 6 win, Tour de Suisse
6th overall, Giro d'Italia
1988 – GIS Gelati-Bruiatori Ecoflam
6th overall, Giro d'Italia
1989 – Seur
8th overall, Giro d'Italia
26th overall, Vuelta a España
1990 – Seur
1st overall, Vuelta a España
3rd overall, Giro d'Italia
1991 – Gatorade-Chateau d'Ax
8th overall, Giro d'Italia
30th overall, Tour de France
18th overall, Vuelta a España
1992 – Gatorade-Chateau d'Ax
Italian National Road Race Championship
4th overall, Giro d'Italia
1993 – Mapei
28th overall, Giro d'Italia

=== Grand Tour general classification results timeline ===
Grand Tour	1985	1986	1987	1988	1989	1990	1991	1992	1993	1994
Vuelta a España	—	—	—	—	26	1	18	4	DNF	—
Giro d'Italia	14	8	6	6	8	3	8	4	28	DNF
Tour de France	—	DNF	—	—	—	DNF	30	—	—	—

Legend
—	Did not compete
DNF	Did not finish
