= Ivan Ivanov (cyclist) =

Soviet cyclist

Personal information
- Born: 9 May 1960 (age 66)

Cycling career
- Sport: Cycling
- Role: Rider

Amateur team
- 1987–1988: Soviet Union National Team

Professional teams
- 1989–1990: Alfa Lum
- 1991–1992: Seur
- 1993: Deportpublic

Major wins
- Vuelta a España 2 individual stages (1989, 1991) Young riders' classification (1989) National Road Race Championships (1989)

Ivan Ivanov (born 9 May 1960) is a Soviet former racing cyclist. In the 1989 Vuelta a España, he finished sixth overall and won one stage. He came in eighth place overall the following year and won another stage in 1991. He also rode in the 1990 Tour de France, but did not finish the race.
