= 1990 Vuelta a España =

Race details
- Dates: 24 April - 15 May
- Stages: 22
- Distance: 3,680 km (2,287 mi)
- Winning time: 94h 36' 40"

Results
Jersey awarded to the overall winner	Winner	Marco Giovannetti (ITA)	(Seur)
	Second	Pedro Delgado (ESP)	(Banesto)
	Third	Anselmo Fuerte (ESP)	(ONCE)
Jersey awarded to the points classification winner	Points	Uwe Raab (GDR)	(PDM)
Jersey awarded to the mountains classification winner	Mountains	José Martín Farfán (COL)	(Kelme-Ibexpress)
Jersey awarded to the youth classification winner	Youth	Uwe Ampler (GDR)	(PDM)
Jersey awarded to the combination classification winner	Combination	Federico Echave (ESP)	(CLAS-Cajastur)
Jersey awarded to the sprints classification winner	Sprints	Miguel Ángel Iglesias (ESP)	(Puertas Mavisa)
	Team	ONCE	

The 45th Edition Vuelta a España (Tour of Spain), a long-distance bicycle stage race and one of the three grand tours, was held from 24 April to 15 May 1990. It consisted of 22 stages covering a total of 3,680 km (2,287 mi), and was won by Marco Giovannetti of the Seur cycling team.

Defending champion Pedro Delgado was the principal favourite for the win of the race. Delgado was joined by a strong Banesto team that included Miguel Induráin and Julián Gorospe. The other Spanish favourites included 1986 winner Álvaro Pino as well as Anselmo Fuerte and 1982 winner Marino Lejarreta. Of the potential foreign winners were the strong Colombians which included Fabio Parra and Lucho Herrera.

Pello Ruiz Cabestany won the opening time trial and took the first leader's jersey. The following day a breakaway got away and Viktor Klimov took the jersey. On the sixth stage a break won the day and took an advantage of over four minutes. Gorospe took the leader's jersey. However, on the eleventh stage, Gorospe had a bad day and lost the jersey to Marco Giovannetti who had been second on the general classification and had been in the break that gained the time on the favourites. Delgado tried to close the gap to Giovannetti over the remainder of the race but could not. Giovannetti won his first and only grand tour ahead of Delgado and Anselmo Fuerte.

== Route ==
List of stages
Stage	Date	Course	Distance	Type	Winner
1	24 April	Benicàssim to Benicàssim	10.3 km (6 mi)	Individual time trial	Pello Ruiz Cabestany (ESP)
2a	25 April	Oropesa to Castellón	108 km (67 mi)		Emilio Cuadrado (ESP)
2b	25 April	Benicàssim to Borriana	36.3 km (23 mi)	Team time trial	Lotus–Festina
3	26 April	Dénia to Murcia	196.3 km (122 mi)		Silvio Martinello (ITA)
4	27 April	Murcia to Almería	226.2 km (141 mi)		Erwin Nijboer (NED)
5	28 April	Almería to Sierra Nevada	198 km (123 mi)		Patrice Esnault (FRA)
6	29 April	Loja to Ubrique	195.2 km (121 mi)		Jesper Worre (DEN)
7	30 April	Jerez to Seville	190.3 km (118 mi)		Benny Van Brabant (BEL)
8	1 May	Seville to Mérida	187.6 km (117 mi)		Atle Pedersen (NOR)
9	2 May	Cáceres to Guijuelo	192.7 km (120 mi)		Néstor Mora (COL)
10	3 May	Peñaranda de Bracamonte to León	226.8 km (141 mi)		Uwe Raab (DDR)
11	4 May	León to San Isidro	203 km (126 mi)		Carlos Hernández (ESP)
12	5 May	San Isidro to Naranco	156 km (97 mi)		Alberto Camargo (COL)
13	6 May	Oviedo to Santander	193.3 km (120 mi)		Nico Emonds (BEL)
14	7 May	Santander to Nájera	207.5 km (129 mi)		Bernd Gröne (FRG)
15	8 May	Ezcaray to Valdezcaray	24.1 km (15 mi)	Individual time trial	Jean-François Bernard (FRA)
16	9 May	Logroño to Pamplona	165.5 km (103 mi)		Uwe Raab (DDR)
17	10 May	Pamplona to Jaca	155.3 km (96 mi)		Federico Echave (ESP)
18	11 May	Jaca to Cerler	178.5 km (111 mi)		José Martín Farfán (COL)
19	12 May	Benasque to Zaragoza	223.6 km (139 mi)		Asiat Saitov (URS)
20	13 May	Zaragoza to Zaragoza	40 km (25 mi)	Individual time trial	Pello Ruiz Cabestany (ESP)
21	14 May	Collado Villalba to Palazuelos de Eresma	188.6 km (117 mi)		Denis Roux (FRA)
22	15 May	Segovia to Madrid	177 km (110 mi)		Uwe Raab (DDR)
	Total		3,680 km (2,287 mi)		

== Results ==
=== Final General Classification ===
Rank	Rider	Team	Time
1	(Italy) Marco Giovannetti	Seur	94h 36' 40s
2	(Spain) Pedro Delgado	Banesto	a 1' 28s
3	(Spain) Anselmo Fuerte	ONCE	a 1' 48s
4	(Spain) Pello Ruiz Cabestany	ONCE	a 2' 16s
5	(Colombia) Fabio Parra	Kelme-Ibexpress	a 3' 07s
6	(Spain) Federico Echave	CLAS-Cajastur	a 3' 52s
7	(Spain) Miguel Induráin	Banesto	a 6' 22s
8	(Soviet Union) Ivan Ivanov	Alfa Lum	a 6' 48s
9	(East Germany) Uwe Ampler	PDM-Concorde	a 7' 15s
10	(France) Denis Roux	Toshiba	a 7' 56s
11	(Colombia) José Martín Farfán	Kelme-Ibexpress	
12	(Colombia) Luis Herrera	Café de Colombia	
13	(Colombia) Carlos Jaramillo	Postóbon	
14	(Spain) Ignacio Gaston Crespo	CLAS-Cajastur	
15	(Colombia) Francisco Rodríguez	Pony Malta-Avianca	
16	(Switzerland) Tony Rominger	Chateaux d'Ax	
17	(Colombia) Alvaro Mejia	Postóbon	
18	(Spain) Jesús Montoya	BH-Amaya	
19	(Colombia) Álvaro Sierra	Café de Colombia	
20	(Spain) Jon Unzaga Bombin	Seur	
21	(Spain) Julián Gorospe	Banesto	
22	(Colombia) Alberto Luis Camargo	Café de Colombia	
23	(Spain) José Luis Laguia	Lotus-Festina	
24	(Colombia) Pablo Wilches	Pony Malta-Avianca	
25	(Colombia) Gerardo Moncada	Postóbon	
