= Camillo Passera =

Italian cyclist

Personal information
- Born: 24 March 1965 (age 61) Varese, Italy

Cycling career
- Sport: Cycling
- Role: Rider

Camillo Passera (born 24 March 1965) is a former Italian racing cyclist. He rode in six Grand Tours between 1987 and 1991.
