= Jesper Worre =

Danish cyclist

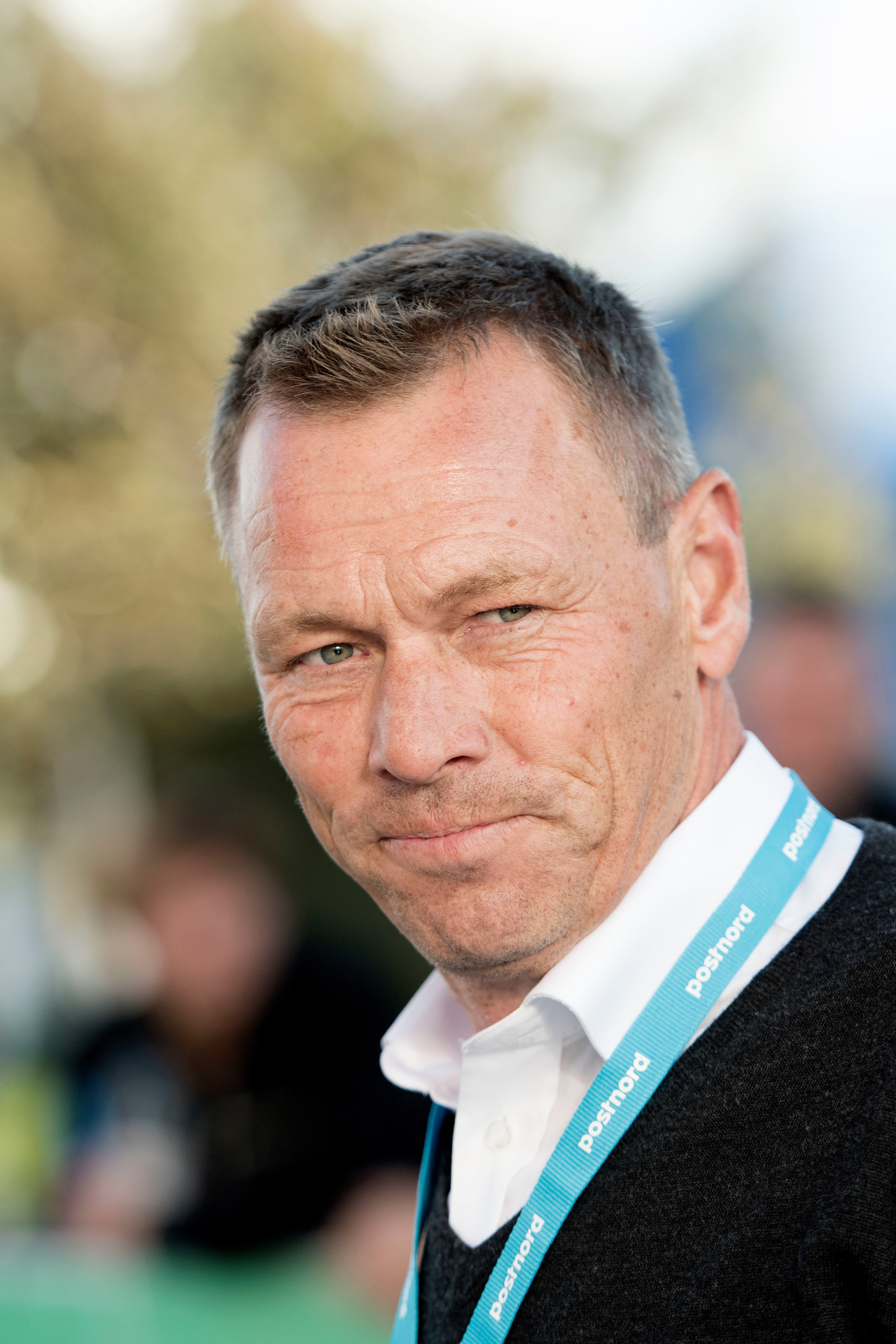

Personal information
- Full name: Jesper Worre
- Born: 5 June 1959 (age 67) Frederiksberg, Denmark

Cycling career
- Sport: Cycling
- Current team: Retired
- Discipline: Road
- Role: Rider

Professional teams
- 1982–1985: Sammontana
- 1986: Santini – Cierre
- 1987: Selca – Conti – Galli
- 1988–1990: Café de Colombia
- 1991: Scott – BiKyle Flyers
- 1992: Amore & Vita – Fanini

Jesper Worre (born 5 June 1959) is a former Danish professional bicycle racer and a former director of the Danmarks Cykle Union (DCU) by the board of directors.

== Biography ==
Worre competed in the team time trial event at the 1980 Summer Olympics.

He was a professional between 1982 and 1992 and took part in the 1989 Tour de France, finishing 88th in the general classification.

Worre has once been tested positive for amineptine in 1992, he confessed to the use of doping, receiving a conditional suspension. Amineptine is a mild but pleasant stimulant and a fast-acting mood-brightener. Amineptine had been on the doping list for a couple of months before Worres confession of using amineptine, and was removed again from the list of banned performance-enhancing drugs shortly after. Worre was caught a doping a second time, making him the only Danish rider aside from Kim Andersen to be caught doping multiple times.

On the other hand, Worre fights doping in professional cycling through his influence in the media and within the Danish Cycling Union (DCU)

== Doping ==
- 1992: Jesper Worre found guilty of the abuse of amineptine during competition.

== Road honours ==
1977

- Junior road Champion of Denmark

1980

- Champion of Denmark in amateur teams- mountains

1983

- Giro del Veneto
- third in the GP Industria & Artigianato di Larciano

1984

- Stage 1, Tirreno–Adriatico

1985

- Prologue of the Danmark Rundt
- second in the GP Industria & Artigianato di Larciano

1986

- Danmark Rundt
- third in the Grand Prix Eddy Merckx

1987

- second in the Gran Premio Città di Camaiore

1988

- Stages 3 and 7, Tour of Sweden
- Tour of Sweden
- Tour of the Americas

1990

- Stage 6, Vuelta a España

1991

- Stage 11, Vuelta a la Argentina

== Track honours ==
=== World championships ===
Colorado Springs 1986

- (bronze) Individual pursuit

Vienna 1987

- (silver) Individual pursuit

Gand 1988

- (bronze) Individual pursuit
