= Pony Malta (cycling team) =

Cycling team (1987–1991)

Team information
- Registered: Colombia
- Founded: 1987
- Disbanded: 1991
- Discipline: Road

Key personnel
- Team managers: Manuel Ignacio Gutiérrez; Héctor Julio Mayorga

Team name history
- 1987 1987–1989 1990–1991 1996: Western–Rossin; Pony Malta–Bavaria; Pony Malta–Avianca; Pony Malta

Pony Malta, was a Colombian professional cycling team that raced from 1987 to 1993, and again in 1996.

The team was also known as Western-Rossin in 1987 and supplied with Rossin bikes. The team continued racing until mid-April 1987, after which it was succeeded, in turn, by Punto Sport and then Catalina. From May onwards, the Colombian federation took over, and by the middle of that month, a strong new sponsor was secured in Pony Malta.

The team competed in the 1991 Giro d'Italia and in two editions of the Vuelta a España, but had no stage victories in any.
