= List of teams and cyclists in the 1990 Tour de France =

The number of riders per nation participated in the 1990 Tour de France: 20+ / 10–19 / 2–9 / 1

The 1990 Tour de France started with 198 cyclists, divided into 22 teams of 9 cyclists: Sixteen teams qualified based on the FICP team ranking, while six teams were given wildcards.

== Teams ==
Qualified teams

- Z–Tomasso
- Castorama
- Banesto
- PDM–Concorde–Ultima
- ONCE
- RMO
- Panasonic–Sportlife
- Chateau d'Ax–Salotti
- 7-Eleven
- Weinmann–SMM–Uster
- Helvetia–La Suisse
- Histor–Sigma
- Lotto–Superclub
- Carrera Jeans–Vagabond
- Buckler–Colnago–Decca
- Ariostea

Invited teams

- Seur
- Toshiba
- Postobón–Manzana–Ryalcao
- TVM
- Kelme–Ibexpress
- Alfa Lum

== Cyclists ==
=== By starting number ===
Legend
No.	Starting number worn by the rider during the Tour
Pos.	Position in the general classification
Time	Deficit to the winner of the general classification
General classification	Denotes the winner of the general classification
Points classification	Denotes the winner of the points classification
Mountains classification	Denotes the winner of the mountains classification
Team classification	Denotes the winner of the team classification
Combativity award	Denotes the winner of the combativity award
DNF	Denotes a rider who did not finish
NP	Denotes a rider who was a non-participant
AB	Denotes a rider who abandoned
EL	Denotes a rider who was eliminated
HD	Denotes a rider who was outside the time limit (French: Hors Delai)
Age correct as of 30 June 1990, the date on which the Tour began

No.	Name	Nationality	Team	Age	Pos.	Time	Ref
1	Greg LeMond	United States	Z–Tomasso	29	1	90h 43' 20"	
2	Éric Boyer	France	Z–Tomasso	26	19	+ 22' 09"	
3	Bruno Cornillet	France	Z–Tomasso	27	39	+ 53' 00"	
4	Gilbert Duclos-Lassalle	France	Z–Tomasso	35	65	+ 1h 22' 34"	
5	Atle Kvålsvoll	Norway	Z–Tomasso	28	26	+ 32' 03"	
6	François Lemarchand	France	Z–Tomasso	29	104	+ 1h 54' 12"	
7	Robert Millar	Great Britain	Z–Tomasso	31	DNF (AB-15)	—	
8	Ronan Pensec	France	Z–Tomasso	26	20	+ 22' 54"	
9	Jérôme Simon	France	Z–Tomasso	29	22	+ 27' 23"	
11	Laurent Fignon	France	Castorama–Raleigh	29	DNF (AB-5)	—	
12	Vincent Barteau	France	Castorama–Raleigh	28	133	+ 2h 17' 41"	
13	Christophe Lavainne	France	Castorama–Raleigh	26	DNF (AB-14)	—	
14	Luc Leblanc	France	Castorama–Raleigh	23	73	+ 1h 31' 13"	
15	Thierry Marie	France	Castorama–Raleigh	27	121	+ 2h 06' 58"	
16	Fabrice Philipot	France	Castorama–Raleigh	24	14	+ 15' 49"	
17	Bjarne Riis	Denmark	Castorama–Raleigh	26	DNF (NP-17)	—	
18	Gérard Rué	France	Castorama–Raleigh	24	DNF (AB-10)	—	
19	Pascal Simon	France	Castorama–Raleigh	33	35	+ 45' 47"	
21	Pedro Delgado	Spain	Banesto	30	4	+ 5' 01"	
22	Marino Alonso	Spain	Banesto	24	96	+ 1h 47' 19"	
23	Dominique Arnaud	France	Banesto	34	59	+ 1h 18' 28"	
24	Julián Gorospe	Spain	Banesto	30	DNF (AB-11)	—	
25	Miguel Induráin	Spain	Banesto	25	10	+ 12' 47"	
26	Luis Javier Lukin	Spain	Banesto	26	DNF (AB-17)	—	
27	Juan Martínez Oliver	Spain	Banesto	26	98	+ 1h 48' 34"	
28	Jesús Rodríguez Magro	Spain	Banesto	30	41	+ 53' 44"	
29	Abelardo Rondón	Colombia	Banesto	26	28	+ 35' 37"	
31	Erik Breukink	Netherlands	PDM–Concorde	26	3	+ 2' 29"	
32	Raúl Alcalá	Mexico	PDM–Concorde	26	8	+ 11' 14"	
33	Uwe Ampler	East Germany	PDM–Concorde	25	DNF (AB-13)	—	
34	Rudy Dhaenens	Belgium	PDM–Concorde	29	43	+ 59' 51"	
35	Martin Earley	Ireland	PDM–Concorde	28	DNF (AB-11)	—	
36	Gert Jakobs	Netherlands	PDM–Concorde	26	140	+ 2h 24' 04"	
37	Sean Kelly	Ireland	PDM–Concorde	34	30	+ 38' 42"	
38	Uwe Raab	East Germany	PDM–Concorde	27	87	+ 1h 41' 05"	
39	Jos van Aert	Netherlands	PDM–Concorde	27	125	+ 2h 09' 31"	
41	Marino Lejarreta	Spain	ONCE	33	5	+ 5' 05"	
42	Eduardo Chozas	Spain	ONCE	29	6	+ 9' 14"	
43	Herminio Díaz Zabala	Spain	ONCE	25	90	+ 1h 43' 18"	
44	Anselmo Fuerte	Spain	ONCE	28	24	+ 31' 18"	
45	Stephen Hodge	Australia	ONCE	28	34	+ 44' 22"	
46	Miguel Martínez	Spain	ONCE	23	29	+ 38' 39"	
47	Melcior Mauri	Spain	ONCE	24	78	+ 1h 33' 40"	
48	Pello Ruiz Cabestany	Spain	ONCE	28	12	+ 13' 39"	
49	Johnny Weltz	Denmark	ONCE	28	DNF (AB-14)	—	
51	Charly Mottet	France	RMO–Mavic–Liberia	27	49	+ 1h 06' 57"	
52	Jean-Claude Bagot	France	RMO–Mavic–Liberia	32	52	+ 1h 10' 21"	
53	Frédéric Brun	France	RMO–Mavic–Liberia	32	91	+ 1h 43' 52"	
54	Éric Caritoux	France	RMO–Mavic–Liberia	29	DNF (AB-11)	—	
55	Thierry Claveyrolat	France	RMO–Mavic–Liberia	31	21	+ 23' 33"	
56	Jean-Claude Colotti	France	RMO–Mavic–Liberia	22	50	+ 1h 08' 31"	
57	Thierry Laurent	France	RMO–Mavic–Liberia	23	107	+ 1h 55' 43"	
58	Pascal Lino	France	RMO–Mavic–Liberia	23	23	+ 30' 38"	
59	Michel Vermote	Belgium	RMO–Mavic–Liberia	27	144	+ 2h 32' 12"	
61	Steven Rooks	Netherlands	Panasonic–Sportlife	29	33	+ 42' 09"	
62	Viatcheslav Ekimov	Soviet Union	Panasonic–Sportlife	24	55	+ 1h 14' 32"	
63	Olaf Ludwig	East Germany	Panasonic–Sportlife	30	141	+ 2h 26' 33"	
64	Guy Nulens	Belgium	Panasonic–Sportlife	32	54	+ 1h 10' 53"	
65	Allan Peiper	Australia	Panasonic–Sportlife	30	DNF (AB-8)	—	
66	Eddy Planckaert	Belgium	Panasonic–Sportlife	31	DNF (AB-9)	—	
67	Marc Sergeant	Belgium	Panasonic–Sportlife	30	62	+ 1h 21' 26"	
68	Eric Van Lancker	Belgium	Panasonic–Sportlife	29	100	+ 1h 50' 11"	
69	Jean-Paul van Poppel	Netherlands	Panasonic–Sportlife	27	146	+ 2h 34' 55"	
71	Gianni Bugno	Italy	Chateau d'Ax	26	7	+ 9' 39"	
72	Giuseppe Calcaterra	Italy	Chateau d'Ax	25	118	+ 2h 04' 51"	
73	Giovanni Fidanza	Italy	Chateau d'Ax	24	147	+ 2h 35' 11"	
74	Roberto Gusmeroli	Italy	Chateau d'Ax	23	76	+ 1h 33' 16"	
75	Mario Kummer	East Germany	Chateau d'Ax	28	88	+ 1h 42' 38"	
76	Tony Rominger	Switzerland	Chateau d'Ax	29	57	+ 1h 15' 51"	
77	Mauro-Antonio Santaromita	Italy	Chateau d'Ax	25	131	+ 2h 14' 45"	
78	Jan Schur	East Germany	Chateau d'Ax	27	105	+ 1h 54' 13"	
79	Alberto Volpi	Italy	Chateau d'Ax	27	74	+ 1h 31' 19"	
81	Andrew Hampsten	United States	7-Eleven–Hoonved	28	11	+ 12' 54"	
82	Norman Alvis	United States	7-Eleven–Hoonved	26	142	+ 2h 26' 41"	
83	Steve Bauer	Canada	7-Eleven–Hoonved	31	27	+ 34' 05"	
84	Andy Bishop	United States	7-Eleven–Hoonved	25	116	+ 2h 03' 10"	
85	Ron Kiefel	United States	7-Eleven–Hoonved	30	83	+ 1h 39' 11"	
86	Dag Otto Lauritzen	Norway	7-Eleven–Hoonved	33	56	+ 1h 15' 25"	
87	Davis Phinney	United States	7-Eleven–Hoonved	30	153	+ 2h 59' 29"	
88	Bob Roll	United States	7-Eleven–Hoonved	29	132	+ 2h 14' 50"	
89	Sean Yates	Great Britain	7-Eleven–Hoonved	30	119	+ 2h 05' 43"	
91	Marco Giovannetti	Italy	Seur	28	DNF (AB-5)	—	
92	Roque de la Cruz	Spain	Seur	25	DNF (AB-3)	—	
93	Mathieu Hermans	Netherlands	Seur	27	DNF (HD-5)	—	
94	Jean-Pierre Heynderickx	Belgium	Seur	25	DNF (AB-11)	—	
95	Pablo Moreno	Spain	Seur	26	124	+ 2h 08' 58"	
96	Álvaro Pino	Spain	Seur	33	DNF (AB-8)	—	
97	Vicente Ridaura	Spain	Seur	26	63	+ 1h 21' 38"	
98	José Rodríguez	Spain	Seur	30	92	+ 1h 44' 16"	
99	José Urea	Spain	Seur	22	89	+ 1h 42' 53"	
101	Adri van der Poel	Netherlands	Weinmann–SMM Uster	31	111	+ 1h 58' 31"	
102	Alfred Achermann	Switzerland	Weinmann–SMM Uster	30	DNF (AB-11)	—	
103	Carlo Bomans	Belgium	Weinmann–SMM Uster	27	110	+ 1h 58' 24"	
104	Beat Breu	Switzerland	Weinmann–SMM Uster	32	42	+ 59' 13"	
105	Michel Dernies	Belgium	Weinmann–SMM Uster	29	58	+ 1h 17' 44	
106	Jan Goessens	Belgium	Weinmann–SMM Uster	27	114	+ 2h 01' 19"	
107	Patrick Robeet	Belgium	Weinmann–SMM Uster	25	36	+ 46' 59"	
108	Kurt Steinmann	Switzerland	Weinmann–SMM Uster	27	94	+ 1h 45' 44"	
109	Thomas Wegmüller	Switzerland	Weinmann–SMM Uster	29	112	+ 1h 59' 03"	
111	Pascal Richard	Switzerland	Helvetia–La Suisse	26	DNF (AB-14)	—	
112	Gilles Delion	France	Helvetia–La Suisse	23	15	+ 16' 57"	
113	Mauro Gianetti	Switzerland	Helvetia–La Suisse	26	61	+ 1h 21' 06"	
114	Othmar Haefliger	Switzerland	Helvetia–La Suisse	27	DNF (AB-13)	—	
115	Jean-Claude Leclercq	France	Helvetia–La Suisse	27	139	+ 2h 23' 36"	
116	Hans-Rudi Maerki	Switzerland	Helvetia–La Suisse	30	DNF (AB-19)	—	
117	Henri Manders	Netherlands	Helvetia–La Suisse	30	113	+ 1h 59' 15"	
118	Niki Rüttimann	Switzerland	Helvetia–La Suisse	27	DNF (NP-17)	—	
119	Guido Winterberg	Switzerland	Helvetia–La Suisse	27	DNF (AB-17)	—	
121	Jean-François Bernard	France	Toshiba	28	DNF (AB-11)	—	
122	John Carlsen	Denmark	Toshiba	28	DNF (AB-8)	—	
123	Christian Chaubet	France	Toshiba	28	149	+ 2h 43' 40"	
124	Andreas Kappes	West Germany	Toshiba	24	136	+ 2h 20' 55"	
125	Pascal Lance	France	Toshiba	26	51	+ 1h 09' 37"	
126	Roland Le Clerc	France	Toshiba	27	84	+ 1h 39' 28"	
127	Philippe Louviot	France	Toshiba	26	47	+ 1h 03' 18"	
128	Yvon Madiot	France	Toshiba	28	DNF (AB-6)	—	
129	Denis Roux	France	Toshiba	28	77	+ 1h 33' 30"	
131	Álvaro Mejía	Colombia	Ryalcao–Postobón	23	48	+ 1h 05' 04"	
132	Juan Carlos Castillo	Colombia	Ryalcao–Postobón	25	79	+ 1h 34' 19"	
133	Omar Hernández	Colombia	Ryalcao–Postobón	28	46	+ 1h 02' 46"	
134	Carlos Jaramillo	Colombia	Ryalcao–Postobón	29	53	+ 1h 10' 47"	
135	Gerardo Moncada	Colombia	Ryalcao–Postobón	27	40	+ 53' 36"	
136	Reynel Montoya	Colombia	Ryalcao–Postobón	30	37	+ 50' 16"	
137	William Palacio	Colombia	Ryalcao–Postobón	25	16	+ 19' 43"	
138	William Pulido	Colombia	Ryalcao–Postobón	25	70	+ 1h 29' 36"	
139	Óscar Vargas	Colombia	Ryalcao–Postobón	26	38	+ 52' 11"	
141	Stephen Roche	Ireland	Histor–Sigma	30	44	+ 1h 00' 07"	
142	Laurent Biondi	France	Histor–Sigma	30	82	+ 1h 35' 49"	
143	Etienne De Wilde	Belgium	Histor–Sigma	32	DNF (NP-6)	—	
144	Paul Haghedooren	Belgium	Histor–Sigma	30	106	+ 1h 54' 29"	
145	Brian Holm	Denmark	Histor–Sigma	27	60	+ 1h 20' 54"	
146	Søren Lilholt	Denmark	Histor–Sigma	24	85	+ 1h 40' 11"	
147	Francis Moreau	France	Histor–Sigma	24	DNF (HD-11)	—	
148	Wilfried Peeters	Belgium	Histor–Sigma	25	120	+ 2h 05' 43"	
149	Laurent Pillon	France	Histor–Sigma	26	103	+ 1h 53' 58"	
151	Claude Criquielion	Belgium	Lotto–Superclub	33	9	+ 12' 04"	
152	Johan Bruyneel	Belgium	Lotto–Superclub	25	17	+ 20' 24"	
153	Peter De Clercq	Belgium	Lotto–Superclub	23	137	+ 2h 21' 26"	
154	Jos Haex	Belgium	Lotto–Superclub	30	68	+ 1h 25' 04"	
155	Johan Museeuw	Belgium	Lotto–Superclub	24	81	+ 1h 35' 10"	
156	Hendrik Redant	Belgium	Lotto–Superclub	27	150	+ 2h 47' 53"	
157	Peter Roes	Belgium	Lotto–Superclub	26	93	+ 1h 45' 22"	
158	Wim Van Eynde	Belgium	Lotto–Superclub	29	97	+ 1h 47' 48"	
159	Patrick Verschueren	Belgium	Lotto–Superclub	27	129	+ 2h 13' 06"	
161	Phil Anderson	Australia	TVM	32	71	+ 1h 30' 01"	
162	Johan Capiot	Belgium	TVM	26	DNF (AB-9)	—	
163	Maarten Ducrot	Netherlands	TVM	32	66	+ 1h 23' 38"	
164	Patrick Jacobs	Belgium	TVM	27	DNF (AB-11)	—	
165	Jörg Müller	Switzerland	TVM	29	31	+ 39' 50"	
166	Martin Schalkers	Netherlands	TVM	28	128	+ 2h 12' 32"	
167	Eddy Schurer	Netherlands	TVM	25	DNF (AB-10)	—	
168	Jan Siemons	Netherlands	TVM	26	143	+ 2h 27' 30"	
169	Jesper Skibby	Denmark	TVM	26	DNF (NP-11)	—	
171	Claudio Chiappucci	Italy	Carrera Jeans–Vagabond	27	2	+ 2' 16"	
172	Guido Bontempi	Italy	Carrera Jeans–Vagabond	30	122	+ 2h 08' 05"	
173	Acácio da Silva	Portugal	Carrera Jeans–Vagabond	29	108	+ 1h 56' 25"	
174	Massimo Ghirotto	Italy	Carrera Jeans–Vagabond	29	95	+ 1h 46' 57"	
175	Alessandro Giannelli	Italy	Carrera Jeans–Vagabond	26	69	+ 1h 25' 12"	
176	Flavio Giupponi	Italy	Carrera Jeans–Vagabond	26	DNF (AB-14)	—	
177	Erich Maechler	Switzerland	Carrera Jeans–Vagabond	29	130	+ 2h 13' 58"	
178	Giancarlo Perini	Italy	Carrera Jeans–Vagabond	30	99	+ 1h 49' 17"	
179	Max Sciandri	Great Britain	Carrera Jeans–Vagabond	23	154	+ 3h 00' 11"	
181	Edwig Van Hooydonck	Belgium	Buckler–Colnago–Decca	23	101	+ 1h 53' 05"	
182	Gerrit de Vries	Netherlands	Buckler–Colnago–Decca	23	67	+ 1h 23' 54"	
183	Frans Maassen	Netherlands	Buckler–Colnago–Decca	25	64	+ 1h 22' 14"	
184	Jelle Nijdam	Netherlands	Buckler–Colnago–Decca	26	127	+ 2h 11' 12"	
185	Twan Poels	Netherlands	Buckler–Colnago–Decca	26	115	+ 2h 02' 28"	
186	Gerrit Solleveld	Netherlands	Buckler–Colnago–Decca	29	117	+ 2h 04' 50"	
187	Patrick Tolhoek	Netherlands	Buckler–Colnago–Decca	25	123	+ 2h 08' 10"	
188	Eric Vanderaerden	Belgium	Buckler–Colnago–Decca	28	DNF (EL-11)	—	
189	Peter Winnen	Netherlands	Buckler–Colnago–Decca	32	DNF (AB-11)	—	
191	Moreno Argentin	Italy	Ariostea	29	DNF (NP-6)	—	
192	Adriano Baffi	Italy	Ariostea	27	134	+ 2h 18' 39"	
193	Davide Cassani	Italy	Ariostea	29	80	+ 1h 34' 21"	
194	Bruno Cenghialta	Italy	Ariostea	27	102	+ 1h 53' 46"	
195	Roberto Conti	Italy	Ariostea	25	18	+ 20' 43"	
196	Alberto Elli	Italy	Ariostea	26	72	+ 1h 30' 40"	
197	Rodolfo Massi	Italy	Ariostea	24	156	+ 3h 16' 26"	
198	Valerio Piva	Italy	Ariostea	31	109	+ 1h 57' 31"	
199	Marcello Siboni	Italy	Ariostea	25	75	+ 1h 33' 12"	
201	Fabio Parra	Colombia	Kelme–Ibexpress	30	13	+ 14' 35"	
202	Antonio Miguel Díaz	Spain	Kelme–Ibexpress	21	138	+ 2h 22' 37"	
203	Antonio Espejo	Spain	Kelme–Ibexpress	22	155	+ 3h 13' 27"	
204	José Martín Farfán	Colombia	Kelme–Ibexpress	24	DNF (AB-8)	—	
205	Mario Lara	Spain	Kelme–Ibexpress	24	DNF (HD-7)	—	
206	Néstor Mora	Colombia	Kelme–Ibexpress	26	86	+ 1h 40' 50"	
207	Nelson Rodríguez Serna	Colombia	Kelme–Ibexpress	24	32	+ 39' 56"	
208	Jesus Rosado	Spain	Kelme–Ibexpress	22	152	+ 2h 56' 11"	
209	Ángel Sarrapio	Spain	Kelme–Ibexpress	31	135	+ 2h 20' 22"	
211	Dimitri Konyshev	Soviet Union	Alfa Lum	24	25	+ 31' 21"	
212	Djamolidine Abdoujaparov	Soviet Union	Alfa Lum	26	145	+ 2h 32' 48"	
213	Nikolai Golovatenko	Soviet Union	Alfa Lum	27	151	+ 2h 49' 08"	
214	Ivan Ivanov	Soviet Union	Alfa Lum	30	DNF (NP-15)	—	
215	Vasily Zhdanov	Soviet Union	Alfa Lum	27	148	+ 2h 42' 53"	
216	Asiat Saitov	Soviet Union	Alfa Lum	25	DNF (AB-15)	—	
217	Alexandre Trubine	Soviet Union	Alfa Lum	24	126	+ 2h 11' 01"	
218	Piotr Ugrumov	Soviet Union	Alfa Lum	29	45	+ 1h 01' 42"	
219	Sergei Uslamin	Soviet Union	Alfa Lum	27	DNF (AB-11)	—	

=== By team ===
Z–Tomasso
No.	Rider	Pos.
1	Greg LeMond (USA)	1
2	Éric Boyer (FRA)	19
3	Bruno Cornillet (FRA)	39
4	Gilbert Duclos-Lassalle (FRA)	65
5	Atle Kvålsvoll (NOR)	26
6	François Lemarchand (FRA)	104
7	Robert Millar (GBR)	AB-15
8	Ronan Pensec (FRA)	20
9	Jérôme Simon (FRA)	22
Directeur sportif: Roger Legeay

Castorama–Raleigh
No.	Rider	Pos.
11	Laurent Fignon (FRA)	AB-5
12	Vincent Barteau (FRA)	133
13	Christophe Lavainne (FRA)	AB-14
14	Luc Leblanc (FRA)	73
15	Thierry Marie (FRA)	121
16	Fabrice Philipot (FRA)	14
17	Bjarne Riis (DEN)	NP-17
18	Gérard Rué (FRA)	AB-10
19	Pascal Simon (FRA)	35
Directeur sportif: Cyrille Guimard

Banesto
No.	Rider	Pos.
21	Pedro Delgado (ESP)	4
22	Marino Alonso (ESP)	96
23	Dominique Arnaud (FRA)	59
24	Julián Gorospe (ESP)	AB-11
25	Miguel Induráin (ESP)	10
26	Luis Javier Lukin (ESP)	AB-17
27	Juan Martínez Oliver (ESP)	98
28	Jesús Rodríguez Magro (ESP)	41
29	Abelardo Rondón (COL)	28
Directeur sportif: José Miguel Echavarri

PDM–Concorde
No.	Rider	Pos.
31	Erik Breukink (NED)	3
32	Raúl Alcalá (MEX)	8
33	Uwe Ampler (DDR)	AB-13
34	Rudy Dhaenens (BEL)	43
35	Martin Earley (IRL)	AB-11
36	Gert Jakobs (NED)	140
37	Sean Kelly (IRL)	30
38	Uwe Raab (DDR)	87
39	Jos van Aert (NED)	125
Directeur sportif: Jan Gijsbers

ONCE
No.	Rider	Pos.
41	Marino Lejarreta (ESP)	5
42	Eduardo Chozas (ESP)	6
43	Herminio Díaz Zabala (ESP)	90
44	Anselmo Fuerte (ESP)	24
45	Stephen Hodge (AUS)	34
46	Miguel Martínez (ESP)	29
47	Melcior Mauri (ESP)	78
48	Pello Ruiz Cabestany (ESP)	12
49	Johnny Weltz (DEN)	AB-14
Directeur sportif: Manuel Saiz

RMO–Mavic–Liberia
No.	Rider	Pos.
51	Charly Mottet (FRA)	49
52	Jean-Claude Bagot (FRA)	52
53	Frédéric Brun (FRA)	91
54	Éric Caritoux (FRA)	AB-11
55	Thierry Claveyrolat (FRA)	21
56	Jean-Claude Colotti (FRA)	50
57	Thierry Laurent (FRA)	107
58	Pascal Lino (FRA)	23
59	Michel Vermote (BEL)	144
Directeur sportif: Bernard Vallet

Panasonic–Sportlife
No.	Rider	Pos.
61	Steven Rooks (NED)	33
62	Viatcheslav Ekimov (URS)	55
63	Olaf Ludwig (DDR)	141
64	Guy Nulens (BEL)	54
65	Allan Peiper (AUS)	AB-8
66	Eddy Planckaert (BEL)	AB-9
67	Marc Sergeant (BEL)	62
68	Eric Van Lancker (BEL)	100
69	Jean-Paul van Poppel (NED)	146
Directeurs sportifs: Walter Planckaert, Peter Post

Chateau d'Ax
No.	Rider	Pos.
71	Gianni Bugno (ITA)	7
72	Giuseppe Calcaterra (ITA)	118
73	Giovanni Fidanza (ITA)	147
74	Roberto Gusmeroli (ITA)	76
75	Mario Kummer (DDR)	88
76	Tony Rominger (SUI)	57
77	Mauro-Antonio Santaromita (ITA)	131
78	Jan Schur (DDR)	105
79	Alberto Volpi (ITA)	74
Directeur sportif: Gianluigi Stanga

7-Eleven–Hoonved
No.	Rider	Pos.
81	Andrew Hampsten (USA)	11
82	Norman Alvis (USA)	142
83	Steve Bauer (CAN)	27
84	Andy Bishop (USA)	116
85	Ron Kiefel (USA)	83
86	Dag Otto Lauritzen (NOR)	56
87	Davis Phinney (USA)	153
88	Bob Roll (USA)	132
89	Sean Yates (GBR)	119
Directeur sportif: Noël Dejonckheere

Seur
No.	Rider	Pos.
91	Marco Giovannetti (ITA)	AB-5
92	Roque de la Cruz (ESP)	AB-3
93	Mathieu Hermans (NED)	HD-5
94	Jean-Pierre Heynderickx (BEL)	AB-11
95	Pablo Moreno (ESP)	124
96	Álvaro Pino (ESP)	AB-8
97	Vicente Ridaura (ESP)	63
98	José Rodríguez (ESP)	92
99	José Urea (ESP)	89
Directeur sportif: Maximino Pérez

Weinmann–SMM Uster
No.	Rider	Pos.
101	Adri van der Poel (NED)	111
102	Alfred Achermann (SUI)	AB-11
103	Carlo Bomans (BEL)	110
104	Beat Breu (SUI)	42
105	Michel Dernies (BEL)	58
106	Jan Goessens (BEL)	114
107	Patrick Robeet (BEL)	36
108	Kurt Steinmann (SUI)	94
109	Thomas Wegmüller (SUI)	112
Directeur sportif: Walter Godefroot

Helvetia–La Suisse
No.	Rider	Pos.
111	Pascal Richard (SUI)	AB-14
112	Gilles Delion (FRA)	15
113	Mauro Gianetti (SUI)	61
114	Othmar Haefliger (SUI)	AB-13
115	Jean-Claude Leclercq (FRA)	139
116	Hans-Rudi Maerki (SUI)	AB-19
117	Henri Manders (NED)	113
118	Niki Rüttimann (SUI)	NP-17
119	Guido Winterberg (SUI)	AB-17
Directeur sportif: Paul Köchli

Toshiba
No.	Rider	Pos.
121	Jean-François Bernard (FRA)	AB-11
122	John Carlsen (DEN)	AB-8
123	Christian Chaubet (FRA)	149
124	Andreas Kappes (FRG)	136
125	Pascal Lance (FRA)	51
126	Roland Le Clerc (FRA)	84
127	Philippe Louviot (FRA)	47
128	Yvon Madiot (FRA)	AB-6
129	Denis Roux (FRA)	77
Directeur sportif: Yves Hézard

Ryalcao–Postobón
No.	Rider	Pos.
131	Álvaro Mejía (COL)	48
132	Juan Carlos Castillo (COL)	79
133	Omar Hernández (COL)	46
134	Carlos Jaramillo (COL)	53
135	Gerardo Moncada (COL)	40
136	Reynel Montoya (COL)	37
137	William Palacio (COL)	16
138	William Pulido (COL)	70
139	Óscar Vargas (COL)	38
Directeur sportif: Raul Mesa

Histor–Sigma
No.	Rider	Pos.
141	Stephen Roche (IRL)	44
142	Laurent Biondi (FRA)	82
143	Etienne De Wilde (BEL)	NP-6
144	Paul Haghedooren (BEL)	106
145	Brian Holm (DEN)	60
146	Søren Lilholt (DEN)	85
147	Francis Moreau (FRA)	HD-11
148	Wilfried Peeters (BEL)	120
149	Laurent Pillon (FRA)	103
Directeur sportif: Willy Teirlinck

Lotto–Superclub
No.	Rider	Pos.
151	Claude Criquielion (BEL)	9
152	Johan Bruyneel (BEL)	17
153	Peter De Clercq (BEL)	137
154	Jos Haex (BEL)	68
155	Johan Museeuw (BEL)	81
156	Hendrik Redant (BEL)	150
157	Peter Roes (BEL)	93
158	Wim Van Eynde (BEL)	97
159	Patrick Verschueren (BEL)	129
Directeur sportif: Jean-Luc Vandenbroucke

TVM
No.	Rider	Pos.
161	Phil Anderson (AUS)	71
162	Johan Capiot (BEL)	AB-9
163	Maarten Ducrot (NED)	66
164	Patrick Jacobs (BEL)	AB-11
165	Jörg Müller (SUI)	31
166	Martin Schalkers (NED)	128
167	Eddy Schurer (NED)	AB-10
168	Jan Siemons (NED)	143
169	Jesper Skibby (DEN)	NP-11
Directeur sportif: Cees Priem

Carrera Jeans–Vagabond
No.	Rider	Pos.
171	Claudio Chiappucci (ITA)	2
172	Guido Bontempi (ITA)	122
173	Acácio da Silva (POR)	108
174	Massimo Ghirotto (ITA)	95
175	Alessandro Giannelli (ITA)	69
176	Flavio Giupponi (ITA)	AB-14
177	Erich Maechler (SUI)	130
178	Giancarlo Perini (ITA)	99
179	Max Sciandri (GBR)	154
Directeur sportif: Davide Boifava

Buckler–Colnago–Decca
No.	Rider	Pos.
181	Edwig Van Hooydonck (BEL)	101
182	Gerrit de Vries (NED)	67
183	Frans Maassen (NED)	64
184	Jelle Nijdam (NED)	127
185	Twan Poels (NED)	115
186	Gerrit Solleveld (NED)	117
187	Patrick Tolhoek (NED)	123
188	Eric Vanderaerden (BEL)	EL-11
189	Peter Winnen (NED)	AB-11
Directeur sportif: Jan Raas

Ariostea
No.	Rider	Pos.
191	Moreno Argentin (ITA)	NP-6
192	Adriano Baffi (ITA)	134
193	Davide Cassani (ITA)	80
194	Bruno Cenghialta (ITA)	102
195	Roberto Conti (ITA)	18
196	Alberto Elli (ITA)	72
197	Rodolfo Massi (ITA)	156
198	Valerio Piva (ITA)	109
199	Marcello Siboni (ITA)	75
Directeur sportif: Giancarlo Ferretti

Kelme–Ibexpress
No.	Rider	Pos.
201	Fabio Parra (COL)	13
202	Antonio Miguel Díaz (ESP)	138
203	Antonio Espejo (ESP)	155
204	José Martín Farfán (COL)	AB-8
205	Mario Lara (ESP)	HD-7
206	Néstor Mora (COL)	86
207	Nelson Rodríguez Serna (COL)	32
208	Jesus Rosado (ESP)	152
209	Ángel Sarrapio (ESP)	135
Directeur sportif: Rafael Carrasco

Alfa Lum
No.	Rider	Pos.
211	Dimitri Konyshev (URS)	25
212	Djamolidine Abdoujaparov (URS)	145
213	Nikolai Golovatenko (URS)	151
214	Ivan Ivanov (URS)	NP-15
215	Vasily Zhdanov (URS)	148
216	Asiat Saitov (URS)	AB-15
217	Alexandre Troubine (URS)	126
218	Piotr Ugrumov (URS)	45
219	Sergei Uslamin (URS)	AB-11
Directeur sportif: Primo Franchini

=== By nationality ===
The 198 riders that competed in the 1990 Tour de France represented 19 different countries. Riders from eight countries won stages during the race; riders from Italy and Netherlands equally won the largest number of stages.

Country	No. of riders	Finishers	Stage wins
Australia	3	2	
Belgium	27	21	2 (Johan Museeuw ×2)
Canada	1	1	
Colombia	14	13	
Denmark	6	2	
East Germany	5	4	1 (Olaf Ludwig)
France	35	28	3 (Thierry Marie, Thierry Claveyrolat, Charly Mottet)
Ireland	3	2	
Italy	22	19	5 (Moreno Argentin, Massimo Ghirotto, Gianni Bugno ×2, Guido Bontempi)
Mexico	1	1	1 (Raúl Alcalá)
Netherlands	19	16	5 (Frans Maassen, Gerrit Solleveld, Jelle Nijdam, Erik Breukink ×2)
Norway	2	2	
Portugal	1	1	
Soviet Union	10	7	1 (Dimitri Konyshev)
Spain	25	20	3 (Eduardo Chozas, Marino Lejarreta, Miguel Induráin)
Switzerland	13	7	
Great Britain	3	2	
United States	7	7	
West Germany	1	1	
Total	198	156	21 (Note: The team time trial on stage 2, won by Panasonic–Sportlife, is not counted in this total.)
