= List of teams and cyclists in the 1989 Giro d'Italia =

The 1989 Giro d'Italia was the 72nd edition of the Giro d'Italia, one of cycling's Grand Tours. The field consisted of 197 riders, and 141 riders finished the race.

== By rider ==
Legend
No.	Starting number worn by the rider during the Giro
Pos.	Position in the general classification
DNF	Denotes a rider who did not finish

No.	Name	Nationality	Team	Pos.	Ref
1	Andrew Hampsten	United States	7-Eleven	3	
2	Sean Yates	Great Britain	7-Eleven	DNF	
3	Dag Otto Lauritzen	Norway	7-Eleven	64	
4	Davis Phinney	United States	7-Eleven	DNF	
5	Ron Kiefel	United States	7-Eleven	102	
6	Gerhard Zadrobilek	Austria	7-Eleven	63	
7	Bob Roll	United States	7-Eleven	114	
8	Jeff Pierce	United States	7-Eleven	59	
9	Jens Veggerby	Denmark	7-Eleven	DNF	
11	Greg LeMond	United States	AD Renting–W-Cup–Bottecchia	39	
12	Miguel Arroyo	Mexico	AD Renting–W-Cup–Bottecchia	60	
13	Alfons De Wolf	Belgium	AD Renting–W-Cup–Bottecchia	70	
14	Frank Hoste	Belgium	AD Renting–W-Cup–Bottecchia	125	
15	Johan Lammerts	Belgium	AD Renting–W-Cup–Bottecchia	136	
16	Bo André Namtvedt	Norway	AD Renting–W-Cup–Bottecchia	DNF	
17	Noël Szostek	Belgium	AD Renting–W-Cup–Bottecchia	133	
18	Chris Bailey	United States	AD Renting–W-Cup–Bottecchia	DNF	
19	Mike Carter	United States	AD Renting–W-Cup–Bottecchia	DNF	
21	Dimitri Konyshev	Soviet Union	Alfa Lum–STM	DNF	
22	Sergei Sukhoruchenkov	Soviet Union	Alfa Lum–STM	54	
23	Ivan Ivanov	Soviet Union	Alfa Lum–STM	DNF	
24	Vladimir Poulnikov	Soviet Union	Alfa Lum–STM	11	
25	Andrei Tchmil	Soviet Union	Alfa Lum–STM	93	
26	Piotr Ugrumov	Soviet Union	Alfa Lum–STM	16	
27	Sergei Uslamin	Soviet Union	Alfa Lum–STM	42	
28	Vasily Zhdanov	Soviet Union	Alfa Lum–STM	80	
29	Nikolai Golovatenko	Soviet Union	Alfa Lum–STM	58	
31	Daniele Bruschi	Italy	Atala–Campagnolo	135	
32	Giuseppe Calcaterra	Italy	Atala–Campagnolo	123	
33	Tullio Cortinovis	Italy	Atala–Campagnolo	DNF	
34	Danilo Gioia	Italy	Atala–Campagnolo	119	
35	Massimo Podenzana	Italy	Atala–Campagnolo	DNF	
36	Massimiliano Lelli	Italy	Atala–Campagnolo	DNF	
37	Rodolfo Massi	Italy	Atala–Campagnolo	85	
38	Silvio Martinello	Italy	Atala–Campagnolo	108	
39	Maurizio Vandelli	Italy	Atala–Campagnolo	DNF	
41	Álvaro Sierra	Colombia	Café de Colombia	DNF	
42	Juan Carlos Arias	Colombia	Café de Colombia	DNF	
43	Samuel Cabrera	Colombia	Café de Colombia	21	
44	Julio César Cadena	Colombia	Café de Colombia	33	
45	Henry Cárdenas	Colombia	Café de Colombia	44	
46	Luis Herrera	Colombia	Café de Colombia	18	
47	Jørgen Pedersen	Denmark	Café de Colombia	DNF	
48	Mario Scirea	Italy	Café de Colombia	131	
49	Jesper Worre	Denmark	Café de Colombia	71	
51	Marino Lejarreta	Spain	Caja Rural	10	
52	Jokin Mújika	Spain	Caja Rural	19	
53	Marcel Arntz	Netherlands	Caja Rural	113	
54	Javier Garciandia	Spain	Caja Rural	111	
55	Jesus Arambarri	Spain	Caja Rural	45	
56	José Sánchez Valencia	Spain	Caja Rural	98	
57	Paul Popp	Austria	Caja Rural	117	
58	Dick Dekker	Netherlands	Caja Rural	129	
59	José Salvador Sanchis	Spain	Caja Rural	24	
61	Urs Zimmermann	Switzerland	Carrera Jeans–Vagabond	6	
62	Acácio da Silva	Portugal	Carrera Jeans–Vagabond	48	
63	Jure Pavlič	Yugoslavia	Carrera Jeans–Vagabond	35	
64	Christian Henn	West Germany	Carrera Jeans–Vagabond	107	
65	Claudio Chiappucci	Italy	Carrera Jeans–Vagabond	46	
66	Massimo Ghirotto	Italy	Carrera Jeans–Vagabond	68	
67	Mario Chiesa	Italy	Carrera Jeans–Vagabond	92	
68	Giancarlo Perini	Italy	Carrera Jeans–Vagabond	56	
69	Marco Votolo	Italy	Carrera Jeans–Vagabond	DNF	
71	Adriano Baffi	Italy	Ariostea	128	
72	Sergio Carcano	Italy	Ariostea	DNF	
73	Bruno Cenghialta	Italy	Ariostea	79	
74	Francesco Cesarini	Italy	Ariostea	DNF	
75	Stephan Joho	Switzerland	Ariostea	DNF	
76	Giuseppe Petito	Italy	Ariostea	109	
77	Luciano Rabottini	Italy	Ariostea	94	
78	Alberto Elli	Italy	Ariostea	DNF	
79	Rolf Sørensen	Denmark	Ariostea	DNF	
81	Marino Amadori	Italy	Del Tongo	55	
82	Marco Bergamo	Italy	Del Tongo	96	
83	Luigi Bielli	Italy	Del Tongo	97	
84	Franco Chioccioli	Italy	Del Tongo	5	
85	Mario Cipollini	Italy	Del Tongo	DNF	
86	Maurizio Fondriest	Italy	Del Tongo	28	
87	Luca Gelfi	Italy	Del Tongo	27	
88	Angelo Lecchi	Italy	Del Tongo	78	
89	Marco Zen	Italy	Del Tongo	101	
91	Stephen Roche	Ireland	Fagor–MBK	9	
92	Paul Kimmage	Ireland	Fagor–MBK	84	
93	Francis Moreau	France	Fagor–MBK	DNF	
94	John Carlsen	Denmark	Fagor–MBK	40	
95	Francesco Rossignoli	Italy	Fagor–MBK	90	
96	Laurent Biondi	France	Fagor–MBK	31	
97	Christian Chaubet	France	Fagor–MBK	DNF	
98	Robert Forest	France	Fagor–MBK	52	
99	Eddy Schepers	Belgium	Fagor–MBK	22	
101	Jürg Bruggmann	Switzerland	Frank–Toyo–Magniflex	106	
102	Bruno Hürlimann	Switzerland	Frank–Toyo–Magniflex	DNF	
103	Rolf Järmann	Switzerland	Frank–Toyo–Magniflex	38	
104	Karl Kalin	Switzerland	Frank–Toyo–Magniflex	100	
105	Omar Pedretti	Switzerland	Frank–Toyo–Magniflex	DNF	
106	Pius Schwarzentruber	Switzerland	Frank–Toyo–Magniflex	126	
107	Pascal Ducrot	Switzerland	Frank–Toyo–Magniflex	DNF	
108	Kurt Steinmann	Switzerland	Frank–Toyo–Magniflex	115	
109	Werner Stutz	Switzerland	Frank–Toyo–Magniflex	62	
111	Moreno Argentin	Italy	Gewiss–Bianchi	15	
112	Emanuele Bombini	Italy	Gewiss–Bianchi	DNF	
113	Davide Cassani	Italy	Gewiss–Bianchi	DNF	
114	Arno Wohlfahrter	Austria	Gewiss–Bianchi	DNF	
115	Bruno Leali	Italy	Gewiss–Bianchi	DNF	
116	Dario Mariuzzo	Italy	Gewiss–Bianchi	DNF	
117	Paolo Rosola	Italy	Gewiss–Bianchi	127	
118	Ennio Salvador	Italy	Gewiss–Bianchi	32	
119	Gianluca Tonetti	Italy	Gewiss–Bianchi	DNF	
121	Claude Criquielion	Belgium	Hitachi–Zonca	7	
122	Jos Lieckens	Belgium	Hitachi–Zonca	DNF	
123	Dirk De Wolf	Belgium	Hitachi–Zonca	DNF	
124	Bruno Bruyere	Belgium	Hitachi–Zonca	49	
125	Hendrik Devos	Belgium	Hitachi–Zonca	73	
126	Jos Haex	Belgium	Hitachi–Zonca	34	
127	Stefan Morjean	Belgium	Hitachi–Zonca	103	
128	Jos van Aert	Netherlands	Hitachi–Zonca	30	
129	Jan Wijnants	Belgium	Hitachi–Zonca	DNF	
131	Luciano Boffo	Italy	Jolly Componibili–Club 88	91	
132	Gianluca Brugnami	Italy	Jolly Componibili–Club 88	61	
133	Stefano Cecini	Italy	Jolly Componibili–Club 88	134	
134	Paolo Cimini	Italy	Jolly Componibili–Club 88	121	
135	Daniele Del Ben	Italy	Jolly Componibili–Club 88	120	
136	Rafaele De Francesco	Italy	Jolly Componibili–Club 88	DNF	
137	Stefano Giuliani	Italy	Jolly Componibili–Club 88	88	
138	Fabrizio Nespoli	Italy	Jolly Componibili–Club 88	DNF	
139	Maurizio Rossi	Italy	Jolly Componibili–Club 88	43	
141	Giuseppe Saronni	Italy	Malvor–Sidi	75	
142	Stefano Allocchio	Italy	Malvor–Sidi	140	
143	Silvano Contini	Italy	Malvor–Sidi	53	
144	Maurizio Piovani	Italy	Malvor–Sidi	50	
145	Fabio Bordonali	Italy	Malvor–Sidi	82	
146	Czesław Lang	Poland	Malvor–Sidi	77	
147	Flavio Giupponi	Italy	Malvor–Sidi	2	
148	Luca Rota	Italy	Malvor–Sidi	DNF	
149	Lech Piasecki	Poland	Malvor–Sidi	67	
151	Erik Breukink	Netherlands	Panasonic–Isostar–Colnago–Agu	4	
152	Peter Winnen	Netherlands	Panasonic–Isostar–Colnago–Agu	29	
153	John Talen	Netherlands	Panasonic–Isostar–Colnago–Agu	105	
154	Allan Peiper	Australia	Panasonic–Isostar–Colnago–Agu	DNF	
155	Jean-Paul van Poppel	Netherlands	Panasonic–Isostar–Colnago–Agu	132	
156	Henk Lubberding	Netherlands	Panasonic–Isostar–Colnago–Agu	69	
157	Eric Van Lancker	Belgium	Panasonic–Isostar–Colnago–Agu	74	
158	Urs Freuler	Switzerland	Panasonic–Isostar–Colnago–Agu	DNF	
159	Hansruedi Märki	Switzerland	Panasonic–Isostar–Colnago–Agu	122	
161	Christian Thary	France	Pepsi-Cola–Alba Cucine	118	
162	Walter Brugna	Italy	Pepsi-Cola–Alba Cucine	DNF	
163	Simone Bruscoli	Italy	Pepsi-Cola–Alba Cucine	137	
164	Angelo Canzonieri	Italy	Pepsi-Cola–Alba Cucine	83	
165	Enrico Galleschi	Italy	Pepsi-Cola–Alba Cucine	DNF	
166	Alessio Di Basco	Italy	Pepsi-Cola–Alba Cucine	138	
167	Giuseppe Franzoni	Italy	Pepsi-Cola–Alba Cucine	DNF	
168	Mauro Santaromita	Italy	Pepsi-Cola–Alba Cucine	36	
169	Stefano Tomasini	Italy	Pepsi-Cola–Alba Cucine	26	
171	Gianni Bugno	Italy	Chateau d'Ax	23	
172	Tony Rominger	Switzerland	Chateau d'Ax	DNF	
173	Claudio Corti	Italy	Chateau d'Ax	95	
174	Giovanni Fidanza	Italy	Chateau d'Ax	110	
175	Alessandro Pozzi	Italy	Chateau d'Ax	41	
176	Alberto Volpi	Italy	Chateau d'Ax	DNF	
177	Franco Vona	Italy	Chateau d'Ax	17	
178	Ennio Vanotti	Italy	Chateau d'Ax	DNF	
179	Stefano Zanatta	Italy	Chateau d'Ax	112	
181	Roberto Conti	Italy	Selca	12	
182	Davide Carli	Italy	Selca	139	
183	Fabiano Fontanelli	Italy	Selca	DNF	
184	Claudio Rio	Italy	Selca	130	
185	Patrizio Gambirasio	Italy	Selca	141	
186	Michele Moro	Italy	Selca	DNF	
187	Edoardo Rocchi	Italy	Selca	89	
188	Fabrizio Vannucci	Italy	Selca	DNF	
189	Bernard Gavillet	Switzerland	Selca	DNS	
191	Marco Giovannetti	Italy	Seur	8	
192	Salvatore Cavallaro	Italy	Seur	87	
193	Jesús Blanco Villar	Spain	Seur	25	
194	Miguel Martínez	Spain	Seur	DNF	
195	Francisco Espinosa	Spain	Seur	81	
196	José Rodríguez García	Spain	Seur	DNF	
197	Luis Díaz De Otazu	Spain	Seur	124	
198	Jon Unzaga	Spain	Seur	20	
199	José Rafael Garcia	Spain	Seur	72	
201	Laurent Fignon	France	Super U–Raleigh–Fiat	1	
202	Dominique Garde	France	Super U–Raleigh–Fiat	37	
203	Pascal Dubois	France	Super U–Raleigh–Fiat	DNF	
204	Thierry Marie	France	Super U–Raleigh–Fiat	116	
205	Jean-Louis Peillon	France	Super U–Raleigh–Fiat	65	
206	Vincent Barteau	France	Super U–Raleigh–Fiat	DNF	
207	Bjarne Riis	Denmark	Super U–Raleigh–Fiat	86	
208	Jacques Decrion	France	Super U–Raleigh–Fiat	47	
209	Éric Salomon	France	Super U–Raleigh–Fiat	57	
211	Phil Anderson	Australia	TVM–Ragno	13	
212	Peter Pieters	Netherlands	TVM–Ragno	DNF	
213	Jan Siemons	Netherlands	TVM–Ragno	99	
214	Rob Kleinsman	Netherlands	TVM–Ragno	104	
215	Martin Schalkers	Netherlands	TVM–Ragno	66	
216	Daan Luyckx	Netherlands	TVM–Ragno	76	
217	Jean-Philippe Vandenbrande	Belgium	TVM–Ragno	51	
218	Johan van der Velde	Netherlands	TVM–Ragno	DNF	
219	Jesper Skibby	Denmark	TVM–Ragno	14	
