= List of teams and cyclists in the 1989 Vuelta a España =

For the 1989 Vuelta a España, the field consisted of 189 riders; 143 finished the race.

== By rider ==
Legend
No.	Starting number worn by the rider during the Vuelta
Pos.	Position in the general classification
Time	Deficit to the winner of the general classification
DNF	Denotes a rider who did not finish

No.	Name	Nationality	Team	Pos.	Time	Ref
1	Reimund Dietzen	West Germany	Teka	DNF	—	
2	Malcolm Elliott	Great Britain	Teka	90	+ 2h 11' 19"	
3	Roberto Córdoba	Spain	Teka	DNF	—	
4	Marino Alonso	Spain	Teka	28	+ 35' 35"	
5	Peter Hilse	West Germany	Teka	39	+ 50' 25"	
6	Enrique Aja	Spain	Teka	21	+ 22' 43"	
7	Alberto Leanizbarrutia	Spain	Teka	80	+ 2h 00' 45"	
8	José Fernando Pacheco Sáez	Spain	Teka	114	+ 2h 39' 56"	
9	Mariano Sánchez Martinez	Spain	Teka	45	+ 1h 05' 03"	
11	Álvaro Pino	Spain	BH	5	+ 4' 28"	
12	Anselmo Fuerte	Spain	BH	DNF	—	
13	Federico Echave	Spain	BH	4	+ 3' 24"	
14	Javier Murguialday	Spain	BH	22	+ 23' 24"	
15	Fernando Quevedo	Spain	BH	49	+ 1h 13' 42"	
16	Philippe Bouvatier	France	BH	42	+ 1h 00' 42"	
17	Jaime Tomás	Spain	BH	68	+ 1h 43' 58"	
18	Manuel Jorge Domínguez	Spain	BH	62	+ 1h 37' 01"	
19	Eduardo Ruiz Santamaría	Spain	BH	94	+ 2h 17' 20"	
21	Pedro Delgado	Spain	Reynolds	1	93h 01' 17"	
22	Miguel Induráin	Spain	Reynolds	DNF	—	
23	Julián Gorospe	Spain	Reynolds	DNF	—	
24	José Luis Laguía	Spain	Reynolds	44	+ 1h 04' 52"	
25	Jesús Rodríguez Magro	Spain	Reynolds	53	+ 1h 18' 58"	
26	William Palacio	Colombia	Reynolds	30	+ 38' 30"	
27	Luis Javier Lukin	Spain	Reynolds	73	+ 1h 50' 00"	
28	Melcior Mauri	Spain	Reynolds	130	+ 3h 04' 48"	
29	Dominique Arnaud	France	Reynolds	38	+ 49' 36"	
31	Eddy Planckaert	Belgium	AD Renting–W-Cup–Bottecchia	95	+ 2h 17' 36"	
32	Jaanus Kuum	Norway	AD Renting–W-Cup–Bottecchia	14	+ 13' 04"	
33	Ronny Van Holen	Belgium	AD Renting–W-Cup–Bottecchia	100	+ 2h 25' 19"	
34	Marnix Lameire	Belgium	AD Renting–W-Cup–Bottecchia	141	+ 3h 25' 10"	
35	Gino De Bakker	Belgium	AD Renting–W-Cup–Bottecchia	DNF	—	
36	René Martens	Belgium	AD Renting–W-Cup–Bottecchia	DNF	—	
37	Filip Van Vooren	Belgium	AD Renting–W-Cup–Bottecchia	143	+ 3h 33' 41"	
38	Adrie Kools	Belgium	AD Renting–W-Cup–Bottecchia	DNF	—	
39	Torjus Larsen	Norway	AD Renting–W-Cup–Bottecchia	115	+ 2h 40' 28"	
41	Erich Maechler	Switzerland	Carrera Jeans–Vagabond	58	+ 1h 28' 38"	
42	Massimo Ghirotto	Italy	Carrera Jeans–Vagabond	76	+ 1h 54' 43"	
43	Primož Čerin	Yugoslavia	Carrera Jeans–Vagabond	93	+ 2h 15' 54"	
44	Deno Davie	Great Britain	Carrera Jeans–Vagabond	116	+ 2h 42' 16"	
45	Walter Magnago	Italy	Carrera Jeans–Vagabond	DNF	—	
46	Ettore Pastorelli	Italy	Carrera Jeans–Vagabond	DNF	—	
47	Bruno Bonnet	France	Carrera Jeans–Vagabond	125	+ 2h 52' 32"	
48	Felice Puttini	Switzerland	Carrera Jeans–Vagabond	123	+ 2h 51' 28"	
49	Enrico Zaina	Italy	Carrera Jeans–Vagabond	DNF	—	
51	Marino Lejarreta	Spain	Caja Rural	20	+ 19' 19"	
52	Helmut Wechselberger	Austria	Caja Rural	37	+ 49' 13"	
53	Mathieu Hermans	Netherlands	Caja Rural	140	+ 3h 23' 11"	
54	Roland Le Clerc	France	Caja Rural	63	+ 1h 37' 49"	
55	Erwin Nijboer	Netherlands	Caja Rural	138	+ 3h 21' 07"	
56	René Beuker	Netherlands	Caja Rural	DNF	—	
57	José Salvador Sanchis	Spain	Caja Rural	48	+ 1h 12' 07"	
58	Guillermo Arenas	Spain	Caja Rural	47	+ 1h 08' 04"	
59	Marcel Arntz	Netherlands	Caja Rural	127	+ 2h 57' 33"	
61	Herman Frison	Belgium	Histor–Sigma	DNF	—	
62	Søren Lilholt	Denmark	Histor–Sigma	DNF	—	
63	Brian Holm	Denmark	Histor–Sigma	101	+ 2h 25' 49"	
64	Rob Harmeling	Netherlands	Histor–Sigma	139	+ 3h 21' 39"	
65	Jean-Pierre Heynderickx	Belgium	Histor–Sigma	124	+ 2h 51' 31"	
66	Dominique Gaigne	France	Histor–Sigma	82	+ 2h 02' 51"	
67	Jan Nevens	Belgium	Histor–Sigma	78	+ 1h 57' 44"	
68	Didier Virvaleix	France	Histor–Sigma	25	+ 27' 25"	
69	Robert D’Hondt	Belgium	Histor–Sigma	DNF	—	
71	Fabio Parra	Colombia	Kelme	2	+ 35"	
72	Pedro Saúl Morales	Colombia	Kelme	8	+ 7' 59"	
73	Iñaki Gastón	Spain	Kelme	7	+ 6' 24"	
74	José Recio	Spain	Kelme	85	+ 2h 04' 18"	
75	Omar Hernández	Colombia	Kelme	41	+ 56' 16"	
76	Juan Martínez Oliver	Spain	Kelme	131	+ 3h 05' 07"	
77	Ricardo Martínez Matey	Spain	Kelme	122	+ 2h 49' 24"	
78	Néstor Mora	Colombia	Kelme	46	+ 1h 05' 55"	
79	Jaime Vilamajó	Spain	Kelme	135	+ 3h 12' 54"	
81	Éric Caritoux	France	RMO	DNF	—	
82	Jean-Claude Colotti	France	RMO	DNF	—	
83	Thierry Claveyrolat	France	RMO	65	+ 1h 41' 23"	
84	Jean-Claude Bagot	France	RMO	9	+ 8' 23"	
85	Patrice Esnault	France	RMO	59	+ 1h 34' 17"	
86	Thierry Laurent	France	RMO	106	+ 2h 29' 11"	
87	Alex Pedersen	Denmark	RMO	133	+ 3h 06' 34"	
88	Franck Pineau	France	RMO	43	+ 1h 00' 58"	
89	Christian Jourdan	France	RMO	126	+ 2h 55' 07"	
91	Juan Tomás Martínez	Spain	Lotus–Zahor	32	+ 41' 21"	
92	Luc Suykerbuyk	Netherlands	Lotus–Zahor	10	+ 9' 44"	
93	Santiago Portillo Rosado	Spain	Lotus–Zahor	84	+ 2h 04' 03"	
94	Ángel Ocaña	Spain	Lotus–Zahor	11	+ 12' 08"	
95	Benny Van Brabant	Belgium	Lotus–Zahor	64	+ 1h 40' 53"	
96	José Luis Morán	Spain	Lotus–Zahor	DNF	—	
97	Luis Pérez García	Spain	Lotus–Zahor	DNF	—	
98	Roberto Torres	Spain	Lotus–Zahor	74	+ 1h 51' 42"	
99	Enrique Alonso	Spain	Lotus–Zahor	71	+ 1h 48' 42"	
101	Casimiro Moreda	Spain	CLAS	121	+ 2h 48' 07"	
102	Francisco Javier Mauleón	Spain	CLAS	61	+ 1h 35' 43"	
103	Américo José Neves Da Silva	Portugal	CLAS	120	+ 2h 46' 48"	
104	José Manuel Oliveira Boga	Spain	CLAS	119	+ 2h 46' 19"	
105	Manuel Cunha	Portugal	CLAS	98	+ 2h 24' 28"	
106	Carlos Muñiz Menéndez	Spain	CLAS	DNF	—	
107	Antonio Sampedro	Spain	CLAS	DNF	—	
108	Javier Duch Ballester	Spain	CLAS	104	+ 2h 27' 48"	
109	Jesús Rodriguez Carballido	Spain	CLAS	72	+ 1h 49' 29"	
111	Pello Ruiz Cabestany	Spain	ONCE	18	+ 18' 38"	
112	Pedro Muñoz Machín Rodríguez	Spain	ONCE	34	+ 44' 00"	
113	Eduardo Chozas	Spain	ONCE	24	+ 27' 21"	
114	Herminio Díaz Zabala	Spain	ONCE	110	+ 2h 36' 41"	
115	José Luis Villanueva	Spain	ONCE	129	+ 3h 03' 55"	
116	Johnny Weltz	Denmark	ONCE	DNF	—	
117	Santos Hernández	Spain	ONCE	27	+ 34' 42"	
118	Jesús Hernández Úbeda	Spain	ONCE	103	+ 2h 26' 45"	
119	Celestino Prieto	Spain	ONCE	DNF	—	
121	Fernando Martinez De Guerenu Ochoa De Olano	Spain	Helios-CR	29	+ 36' 05"	
122	Joaquim Llach	Spain	Helios-CR	86	+ 2h 04' 23"	
123	Antonio Esparza	Spain	Helios-CR	89	+ 2h 09' 55"	
124	Miguel Ángel Iglesias	Spain	Helios-CR	77	+ 1h 57' 37"	
125	Jesús Rodríguez Rodríguez	Spain	Helios-CR	40	+ 53' 42"	
126	José Antonio Casajus Cabrera	Spain	Helios-CR	87	+ 2h 05' 21"	
127	Juan Guillén	Spain	Helios-CR	70	+ 1h 47' 35"	
128	José Andrés Ripoll Jover	Spain	Helios-CR	55	+ 1h 21' 40"	
129	José Ignacio Moratinos Guerra	Spain	Helios-CR	97	+ 2h 24' 01"	
131	Jesús Blanco Villar	Spain	Seur	16	+ 17' 16"	
132	Marco Giovannetti	Italy	Seur	26	+ 32' 33"	
133	Joaquín Hernández Hernández	Spain	Seur	56	+ 1h 22' 42"	
134	Pablo Moreno Rebollo	Spain	Seur	113	+ 2h 39' 16"	
135	José Luis Navarro	Spain	Seur	91	+ 2h 11' 35"	
136	Vicente Ridaura	Spain	Seur	DNF	—	
137	Juan-Carlos Rozas Salgado	Spain	Seur	36	+ 48' 30"	
138	Jon Unzaga	Spain	Seur	23	+ 25' 19"	
139	José Urea	Spain	Seur	107	+ 2h 29' 44"	
141	Óscar Vargas	Colombia	Postobón	3	+ 3' 09"	
142	Pablo Wilches	Colombia	Postobón	33	+ 42' 22"	
143	Carlos Jaramillo	Colombia	Postobón	13	+ 12' 41"	
144	Héctor Julio Patarroyo	Colombia	Postobón	17	+ 17' 32"	
145	Gerardo Moncada	Colombia	Postobón	19	+ 19' 10"	
146	Juan Carlos Castillo	Colombia	Postobón	DNF	—	
147	William Pulido	Colombia	Postobón	118	+ 2h 44' 54"	
148	Luis Fernando Mosquera Restredo	Colombia	Postobón	81	+ 2h 01' 54"	
149	Arsenio Chaparro Cardoso	Colombia	Postobón	57	+ 1h 27' 43"	
151	Giuseppe Saronni	Italy	Malvor–Sidi	DNF	—	
152	Flavio Giupponi	Italy	Malvor–Sidi	DNF	—	
153	Silvano Contini	Italy	Malvor–Sidi	52	+ 1h 16' 17"	
154	Stefano Allocchio	Italy	Malvor–Sidi	137	+ 3h 19' 17"	
155	Roberto Pagnin	Italy	Malvor–Sidi	DNF	—	
156	Fabio Bordonali	Italy	Malvor–Sidi	96	+ 2h 18' 19"	
157	Flavio Vanzella	Italy	Malvor–Sidi	DNF	—	
158	Maurizio Piovani	Italy	Malvor–Sidi	75	+ 1h 54' 27"	
159	Gianni Faresin	Italy	Malvor–Sidi	50	+ 1h 14' 41"	
161	Gilles Mas	France	Puertas Mavisa	DNF	—	
162	Stéphane Guay	France	Puertas Mavisa	136	+ 3h 18' 08"	
163	Sabino Angoitia	Spain	Puertas Mavisa	128	+ 3h 02' 41"	
164	Isaac Lisaso	Spain	Puertas Mavisa	DNF	—	
165	José María Palacín	Spain	Puertas Mavisa	DNF	—	
166	Jens Jentner	Switzerland	Puertas Mavisa	142	+ 3h 30' 58"	
167	Pascal Kohvelter	Luxembourg	Puertas Mavisa	DNF	—	
168	Emilio Cuadrado	Spain	Puertas Mavisa	DNF	—	
169	Rafael Lorenzana	Spain	Puertas Mavisa	DNF	—	
171	Alberto Camargo	Colombia	Café de Colombia	51	+ 1h 14' 44"	
172	Martín Ramírez	Colombia	Café de Colombia	12	+ 12' 18"	
173	José Martín Farfán	Colombia	Café de Colombia	15	+ 16' 17"	
174	Eduardo Acevedo Porras	Colombia	Café de Colombia	109	+ 2h 34' 15"	
175	José Antonio Agudelo Gómez	Colombia	Café de Colombia	92	+ 2h 13' 00"	
176	Israel Corredor	Colombia	Café de Colombia	108	+ 2h 31' 14"	
177	Rubén Darío Beltrán Pérez	Colombia	Café de Colombia	54	+ 1h 19' 52"	
178	Marco Antonio Léon Castro	Colombia	Café de Colombia	83	+ 2h 03' 05"	
179	Bernard Richard	France	Café de Colombia	102	+ 2h 26' 32"	
181	Vladimir Poulnikov	Soviet Union	Alfa Lum–STM	31	+ 40' 09"	
182	Piotr Ugrumov	Soviet Union	Alfa Lum–STM	35	+ 47' 51"	
183	Sergei Sukhoruchenkov	Soviet Union	Alfa Lum–STM	69	+ 1h 44' 07"	
184	Ivan Ivanov	Soviet Union	Alfa Lum–STM	6	+ 5' 00"	
185	Alexandre Zinoviev	Soviet Union	Alfa Lum–STM	132	+ 3h 05' 11"	
186	Sergei Uslamin	Soviet Union	Alfa Lum–STM	DNF	—	
187	Vasily Zhdanov	Soviet Union	Alfa Lum–STM	99	+ 2h 25' 13"	
188	Nikolai Golovatenko	Soviet Union	Alfa Lum–STM	60	+ 1h 35' 37"	
189	Vladimir Muravski	Soviet Union	Alfa Lum–STM	88	+ 2h 06' 38"	
191	Stefano Colagè	Italy	Viscontea	79	+ 1h 58' 49"	
192	Max Sciandri	Great Britain	Viscontea	DNF	—	
193	Uwe Bolten	West Germany	Viscontea	DNF	—	
194	Marco Franceschini	Italy	Viscontea	DNF	—	
195	Joachim Schlaphoff	West Germany	Viscontea	DNF	—	
196	Claudio Savini	Italy	Viscontea	DNF	—	
197	Bruno Surra	Italy	Viscontea	DNF	—	
198	Alessandro Giannelli	Italy	Viscontea	67	+ 1h 41' 53"	
199	Antonio Bevilacqua	Italy	Viscontea	117	+ 2h 42' 17"	
201	Paulo de Oliveira Pinto	Portugal	Sicasal–Acral	DNF	—	
202	Paulo Jorge Silva	Portugal	Sicasal–Acral	105	+ 2h 28' 02"	
203	Joaquim Gomes	Portugal	Sicasal–Acral	DNF	—	
204	António Joaquim De Castro Oliveira Pinto	Portugal	Sicasal–Acral	111	+ 2h 37' 21"	
205	Manuel De Sa Neves	Portugal	Sicasal–Acral	112	+ 2h 37' 56"	
206	Fernando Sousa Fernandes	Portugal	Sicasal–Acral	66	+ 1h 41' 28"	
207	Antonio Araujo	Portugal	Sicasal–Acral	DNF	—	
208	Jorge Santos	Portugal	Sicasal–Acral	DNF	—	
209	José Joaquim Costa Poeira	Portugal	Sicasal–Acral	134	+ 3h 11' 03"	
