= List of teams and cyclists in the 1991 Giro d'Italia =

The 1991 Giro d'Italia was the 74th edition of the Giro d'Italia, one of cycling's Grand Tours. The field consisted of 180 riders, and 133 riders finished the race.

== By rider ==
Legend
No.	Starting number worn by the rider during the Giro
Pos.	Position in the general classification
DNF	Denotes a rider who did not finish

No.	Name	Nationality	Team	Ref
1	Gianni Bugno	Italy	Chateau d'Ax–Gatorade	
2	Stefano Zanatta	Italy	Chateau d'Ax–Gatorade	
3	Mario Kummer	Germany	Chateau d'Ax–Gatorade	
4	Roberto Gusmeroli	Italy	Chateau d'Ax–Gatorade	
5	Giuseppe Calcaterra	Italy	Chateau d'Ax–Gatorade	
6	Valerio Tebaldi	Italy	Chateau d'Ax–Gatorade	
7	Giovanni Fidanza	Italy	Chateau d'Ax–Gatorade	
8	Mario Scirea	Italy	Chateau d'Ax–Gatorade	
9	Marco Giovannetti	Italy	Chateau d'Ax–Gatorade	
11	Andrea Chiurato	Italy	Amore & Vita–Fanini	
12	Daniele Castro	Italy	Amore & Vita–Fanini	
13	Fabrizio Convalle	Italy	Amore & Vita–Fanini	
14	Stefano Della Santa	Italy	Amore & Vita–Fanini	
15	Florido Barale	Italy	Amore & Vita–Fanini	
16	Maurizio Molinari	Italy	Amore & Vita–Fanini	
17	Brian Petersen	Denmark	Amore & Vita–Fanini	
18	Roberto Pelliconi	Italy	Amore & Vita–Fanini	
19	Edward Salas	Australia	Amore & Vita–Fanini	
21	Pedro Delgado	Spain	Banesto	
22	Fabian Fuchs	Switzerland	Banesto	
23	Dominique Arnaud	France	Banesto	
24	Armand de Las Cuevas	France	Banesto	
25	Julián Gorospe	Spain	Banesto	
26	Rubén Gorospe	Spain	Banesto	
27	Aitor Garmendia	Spain	Banesto	
28	Juan Martínez	Spain	Banesto	
29	Jean-François Bernard	France	Banesto	
31	Claudio Chiappucci	Italy	Carrera Jeans–Tassoni	
32	Flavio Giupponi	Italy	Carrera Jeans–Tassoni	
33	Vladimir Poulnikov	Soviet Union	Carrera Jeans–Tassoni	
34	Djamolidine Abdoujaparov	Soviet Union	Carrera Jeans–Tassoni	
35	Max Sciandri	Italy	Carrera Jeans–Tassoni	
36	Massimo Ghirotto	Italy	Carrera Jeans–Tassoni	
37	Giancarlo Perini	Italy	Carrera Jeans–Tassoni	
38	Alessandro Giannelli	Italy	Carrera Jeans–Tassoni	
39	Enrico Zaina	Italy	Carrera Jeans–Tassoni	
41	Laurent Fignon	France	Castorama–Raleigh	
42	Dominique Arnould	France	Castorama–Raleigh	
43	Jean-Claude Bagot	France	Castorama–Raleigh	
44	Jacky Durand	France	Castorama–Raleigh	
45	Dominique Garde	France	Castorama–Raleigh	
46	Bjarne Riis	Denmark	Castorama–Raleigh	
47	Jean-Philippe Rouxel	France	Castorama–Raleigh	
48	Didier Thueux	France	Castorama–Raleigh	
49	Frédéric Vichot	France	Castorama–Raleigh	
51	Adriano Baffi	Italy	Ariostea	
52	Davide Cassani	Italy	Ariostea	
53	Roberto Conti	Italy	Ariostea	
54	Giorgio Furlan	Italy	Ariostea	
55	Federico Ghiotto	Italy	Ariostea	
56	Bruno Cenghialta	Italy	Ariostea	
57	Massimiliano Lelli	Italy	Ariostea	
58	Marco Lietti	Italy	Ariostea	
59	Rolf Sørensen	Denmark	Ariostea	
61	Federico Echave	Spain	CLAS–Cajastur	
62	Nico Emonds	Belgium	CLAS–Cajastur	
63	Casimiro Moreda	Spain	CLAS–Cajastur	
64	Ángel Camarillo	Spain	CLAS–Cajastur	
65	Iñaki Gastón	Spain	CLAS–Cajastur	
66	Fernando Escartín	Spain	CLAS–Cajastur	
67	Francisco Espinosa	Spain	CLAS–Cajastur	
68	Alberto Leanizbarrutia	Italy	CLAS–Cajastur	
69	Javier Duch	Spain	CLAS–Cajastur	
71	Luigi Botteon	Italy	Colnago–Lampre	
72	Gianluca Bortolami	Italy	Colnago–Lampre	
73	Davide Bramati	Italy	Colnago–Lampre	
74	Stefano Cortinovis	Italy	Colnago–Lampre	
75	Dario Nicoletti	Italy	Colnago–Lampre	
76	Maurizio Piovani	Italy	Colnago–Lampre	
77	Oscar Pelliccioli	Italy	Colnago–Lampre	
78	Ján Svorada	Czechoslovakia	Colnago–Lampre	
79	Marek Szerszyński	Poland	Colnago–Lampre	
81	Franco Ballerini	Italy	Del Tongo–MG Boys	
82	Luigi Bielli	Italy	Del Tongo–MG Boys	
83	Francesco Cesarini	Italy	Del Tongo–MG Boys	
84	Franco Chioccioli	Italy	Del Tongo–MG Boys	
85	Mario Cipollini	Italy	Del Tongo–MG Boys	
86	Luca Gelfi	Italy	Del Tongo–MG Boys	
87	Zenon Jaskuła	Poland	Del Tongo–MG Boys	
88	Eros Poli	Italy	Del Tongo–MG Boys	
89	Fabio Roscioli	Italy	Del Tongo–MG Boys	
91	Maurizio Vandelli	Italy	Gis Gelati–Ballan	
92	Giuseppe Petito	Italy	Gis Gelati–Ballan	
93	Silvio Martinello	Italy	Gis Gelati–Ballan	
94	Bruno Leali	Italy	Gis Gelati–Ballan	
95	Enrico Galleschi	Italy	Gis Gelati–Ballan	
96	Walter Magnago	Italy	Gis Gelati–Ballan	
97	Fabio Bordonali	Italy	Gis Gelati–Ballan	
98	Dario Bottaro	Italy	Gis Gelati–Ballan	
99	Germano Pierdomenico	Italy	Gis Gelati–Ballan	
101	Stefano Allocchio	Italy	Italbonifica–Navigare	
102	Michele Moro	Italy	Italbonifica–Navigare	
103	Massimo Podenzana	Italy	Italbonifica–Navigare	
104	Michele Coppolillo	Italy	Italbonifica–Navigare	
105	Fabiano Fontanelli	Italy	Italbonifica–Navigare	
106	Sergio Carcano	Italy	Italbonifica–Navigare	
107	Stefano Zanini	Italy	Italbonifica–Navigare	
108	Fabrizio Settembrini	Italy	Italbonifica–Navigare	
109	William Dazzani	Italy	Italbonifica–Navigare	
111	Daniel Steiger	Switzerland	Jolly Componibili–Club 88	
112	Paolo Botarelli	Italy	Jolly Componibili–Club 88	
113	Stefano Giuliani	Italy	Jolly Componibili–Club 88	
114	Endrio Leoni	Italy	Jolly Componibili–Club 88	
115	Edoardo Rocchi	Italy	Jolly Componibili–Club 88	
116	Claudio Brandini	Italy	Jolly Componibili–Club 88	
117	Giovanni Strazzer	Italy	Jolly Componibili–Club 88	
118	Marco Vitali	Italy	Jolly Componibili–Club 88	
119	Franco Vona	Italy	Jolly Componibili–Club 88	
121	Roberto Pagnin	Italy	Lotus–Festina	
122	Acácio da Silva	Portugal	Lotus–Festina	
123	Juan Tomás Martínez	Spain	Lotus–Festina	
124	Mathieu Hermans	Netherlands	Lotus–Festina	
125	Luc Suykerbuyk	Netherlands	Lotus–Festina	
126	Juan Valbuena	Spain	Lotus–Festina	
127	Ramón González Arrieta	Spain	Lotus–Festina	
128	Vadim Chabalkine	Soviet Union	Lotus–Festina	
129	Andrei Zoubiv	Soviet Union	Lotus–Festina	
131	Stephen Hodge	Australia	ONCE	
132	Miguel Martínez	Spain	ONCE	
133	Marino Lejarreta	Spain	ONCE	
134	Eduardo Chozas	Spain	ONCE	
135	Kenneth Weltz	Denmark	ONCE	
136	Pedro Díaz Zabala	Spain	ONCE	
137	Xabier Aldanondo	Spain	ONCE	
138	Luis María Díaz De Otazu	Spain	ONCE	
139	Santos Hernández	Spain	ONCE	
141	Pablo Wilches	Colombia	Pony Malta–Avianca	
142	Dubán Ramírez	Colombia	Pony Malta–Avianca	
143	Miguel Sanabria	Colombia	Pony Malta–Avianca	
144	Demetrio Cuspoca	Colombia	Pony Malta–Avianca	
145	Nelson Rodríguez	Colombia	Pony Malta–Avianca	
146	Álvaro Lozano	Colombia	Pony Malta–Avianca	
147	Edilberto Mariño Reyes	Colombia	Pony Malta–Avianca	
148	Juan Carlos Arias	Colombia	Pony Malta–Avianca	
149	Rafael Tolosa	Colombia	Pony Malta–Avianca	
151	Leonardo Sierra	Venezuela	Selle Italia–Vetta	
152	Andrea Tafi	Italy	Selle Italia–Vetta	
153	Raimondo Vairetti	Italy	Selle Italia–Vetta	
154	Daniel Wyder	Switzerland	Selle Italia–Vetta	
155	Arno Wohlfahrter	Austria	Selle Italia–Vetta	
156	Roberto Caruso	Italy	Selle Italia–Vetta	
157	Richard Parra	Venezuela	Selle Italia–Vetta	
158	Andrea Michelucci	Italy	Selle Italia–Vetta	
159	Andrea De Mitri	Italy	Selle Italia–Vetta	
161	Ronan Pensec	France	Seur–Otero	
162	Viktor Klimov	Soviet Union	Seur–Otero	
163	José Recio	Spain	Seur–Otero	
164	José Cano Camacho	Spain	Seur–Otero	
165	Eleuterio Anguita	Spain	Seur–Otero	
166	Federico García Meliá	Spain	Seur–Otero	
167	Roque de la Cruz	Spain	Seur–Otero	
168	José Salvador Sanchis	Spain	Seur–Otero	
169	José Urea	Spain	Seur–Otero	
171	Jos van der Pas	Netherlands	TVM–Sanyo	
172	Johan Capiot	Belgium	TVM–Sanyo	
173	Jaanus Kuum	Norway	TVM–Sanyo	
174	Jörg Müller	Switzerland	TVM–Sanyo	
175	Marc Siemons	Netherlands	TVM–Sanyo	
176	Martin Schalkers	Netherlands	TVM–Sanyo	
177	Peter Meinert	Denmark	TVM–Sanyo	
178	Rob Harmeling	Netherlands	TVM–Sanyo	
179	Scott Sunderland	Australia	TVM–Sanyo	
181	Stefano Colagè	Italy	ZG Mobili–Bottecchia	
182	Giuseppe Citterio	Italy	ZG Mobili–Bottecchia	
183	Mauro Consonni	Italy	ZG Mobili–Bottecchia	
184	Gianni Faresin	Italy	ZG Mobili–Bottecchia	
185	Silvano Lorenzon	Italy	ZG Mobili–Bottecchia	
186	Gianluca Pierobon	Italy	ZG Mobili–Bottecchia	
187	Davide Perona	Italy	ZG Mobili–Bottecchia	
188	Mario Mantovan	Italy	ZG Mobili–Bottecchia	
189	Flavio Vanzella	Italy	ZG Mobili–Bottecchia	
191	Greg LeMond	United States	Z	
192	Éric Boyer	France	Z	
193	Christophe Capelle	France	Z	
194	Philippe Casado	France	Z	
195	Atle Kvålsvoll	Norway	Z	
196	Miguel Arroyo	Mexico	Z	
197	Gilbert Duclos-Lassalle	France	Z	
198	François Lemarchand	France	Z	
199	Robert Forest	France	Z	
