= List of teams and cyclists in the 1992 Vuelta a España =

For the 1992 Vuelta a España, the field consisted of 189 riders; 139 finished the race.

== By rider ==
Legend
No.	Starting number worn by the rider during the Vuelta
Pos.	Position in the general classification
Time	Deficit to the winner of the general classification
DNF	Denotes a rider who did not finish

No.	Name	Nationality	Team	Pos.	Time	Ref
1	Melcior Mauri	Spain	ONCE	DNF	—	
2	Johan Bruyneel	Belgium	ONCE	16	+ 22' 48"	
3	Herminio Díaz Zabala	Spain	ONCE	DNF	—	
4	Anselmo Fuerte	Spain	ONCE	DNF	—	
5	Stephen Hodge	Australia	ONCE	26	+ 37' 41"	
6	Joan Llaneras	Spain	ONCE	DNF	—	
7	Miguel Ángel Martínez	Spain	ONCE	104	+ 2h 32' 27"	
8	Neil Stephens	Australia	ONCE	66	+ 1h 50' 04"	
9	Alex Zülle	Switzerland	ONCE	DNF	—	
11	Steven Rooks	Netherlands	Buckler–Colnago–Decca	10	+ 18' 57"	
12	Edwig Van Hooydonck	Belgium	Buckler–Colnago–Decca	116	+ 2h 52' 29"	
13	Jelle Nijdam	Netherlands	Buckler–Colnago–Decca	103	+ 2h 31' 28"	
14	Eric Vanderaerden	Belgium	Buckler–Colnago–Decca	132	+ 3h 15' 21"	
15	Gerrit de Vries	Netherlands	Buckler–Colnago–Decca	28	+ 40' 54"	
16	Gerrit Solleveld	Netherlands	Buckler–Colnago–Decca	88	+ 2h 17' 49"	
17	Martin Kokkelkoren	Netherlands	Buckler–Colnago–Decca	134	+ 3h 23' 02"	
18	Patrick Robeet	Belgium	Buckler–Colnago–Decca	DNF	—	
19	Rob Mulders	Netherlands	Buckler–Colnago–Decca	117	+ 2h 53' 02"	
21	Pedro Delgado	Spain	Banesto	3	+ 1' 42"	
22	Marino Alonso	Spain	Banesto	94	+ 2h 20' 52"	
23	José Luis de Santos	Spain	Banesto	63	+ 1h 45' 52"	
24	Aitor Garmendia	Spain	Banesto	47	+ 1h 22' 41"	
25	Julián Gorospe	Spain	Banesto	51	+ 1h 27' 52"	
26	Roberto Lezaun	Spain	Banesto	96	+ 2h 26' 13"	
27	Fabrice Philipot	France	Banesto	DNF	—	
28	Jesús Rodríguez Magro	Spain	Banesto	73	+ 1h 59' 50"	
29	Francisco Ignacio San Román	Spain	Banesto	50	+ 1h 25' 51"	
31	Stephen Roche	Ireland	Carrera Jeans–Vagabond	15	+ 22' 40"	
32	Djamolidine Abdoujaparov	Uzbekistan	Carrera Jeans–Vagabond	105	+ 2h 34' 16"	
33	Guido Bontempi	Italy	Carrera Jeans–Vagabond	62	+ 1h 44' 50"	
34	Remo Rossi	Italy	Carrera Jeans–Vagabond	138	+ 3h 47' 55"	
35	Vladimir Poulnikov	Ukraine	Carrera Jeans–Vagabond	44	+ 1h 17' 04"	
36	Mario Chiesa	Italy	Carrera Jeans–Vagabond	118	+ 2h 53' 41"	
37	Henry Cárdenas	Colombia	Carrera Jeans–Vagabond	DNF	—	
38	Andrea Tafi	Italy	Carrera Jeans–Vagabond	98	+ 2h 28' 09"	
39	Andrey Teteryuk	Kazakhstan	Carrera Jeans–Vagabond	DNF	—	
41	Tony Rominger	Switzerland	CLAS–Cajastur	1	96h 14' 50"	
42	Ángel Camarillo	Spain	CLAS–Cajastur	57	+ 1h 34' 34"	
43	Manuel Jorge Domínguez	Spain	CLAS–Cajastur	53	+ 1h 29' 49"	
44	Federico Echave	Spain	CLAS–Cajastur	5	+ 5' 34"	
45	Fabio Hernán Rodríguez	Colombia	CLAS–Cajastur	21	+ 31' 34"	
46	Iñaki Gastón	Spain	CLAS–Cajastur	DNF	—	
47	Arsenio González	Spain	CLAS–Cajastur	24	+ 37' 06"	
48	Francisco Javier Mauleón	Spain	CLAS–Cajastur	9	+ 15' 44"	
49	Jon Unzaga	Spain	CLAS–Cajastur	23	+ 36' 26"	
51	Raúl Alcalá	Mexico	PDM–Ultima–Concorde	8	+ 12' 50"	
52	Erik Breukink	Netherlands	PDM–Ultima–Concorde	27	+ 40' 06"	
53	Tom Cordes	Netherlands	PDM–Ultima–Concorde	80	+ 2h 08' 38"	
54	Gert Jakobs	Netherlands	PDM–Ultima–Concorde	136	+ 3h 31' 40"	
55	Harald Maier	Austria	PDM–Ultima–Concorde	42	+ 1h 09' 56"	
56	Uwe Raab	Germany	PDM–Ultima–Concorde	61	+ 1h 44' 13"	
57	John Talen	Netherlands	PDM–Ultima–Concorde	DNF	—	
58	Jean-Paul van Poppel	Netherlands	PDM–Ultima–Concorde	123	+ 2h 56' 18"	
59	Nico Verhoeven	Netherlands	PDM–Ultima–Concorde	119	+ 2h 54' 17"	
61	Laudelino Cubino	Spain	Amaya Seguros	6	+ 6' 24"	
62	Francisco Antequera	Spain	Amaya Seguros	DNF	—	
63	Jesús Montoya	Spain	Amaya Seguros	2	+ 1' 04"	
64	Javier Murguialday	Spain	Amaya Seguros	31	+ 52' 46"	
65	Fabio Parra	Colombia	Amaya Seguros	7	+ 7' 24"	
66	Per Pedersen	Denmark	Amaya Seguros	106	+ 2h 37' 57"	
67	Fernando Quevedo	Spain	Amaya Seguros	34	+ 57' 15"	
68	Juan Romero	Spain	Amaya Seguros	84	+ 2h 13' 50"	
69	Óscar Vargas	Colombia	Amaya Seguros	45	+ 1h 21' 50"	
71	Gert-Jan Theunisse	Netherlands	TVM–Sanyo	12	+ 19' 41"	
72	Bo Hamburger	Denmark	TVM–Sanyo	49	+ 1h 25' 33"	
73	Rob Harmeling	Netherlands	TVM–Sanyo	109	+ 2h 40' 43"	
74	Dimitri Konyshev	Russia	TVM–Sanyo	DNF	—	
75	Scott Sunderland	Australia	TVM–Sanyo	93	+ 2h 20' 16"	
76	Robert Millar	Great Britain	TVM–Sanyo	11	+ 19' 39"	
77	Jan Siemons	Netherlands	TVM–Sanyo	56	+ 1h 32' 32"	
78	Jesper Skibby	Denmark	TVM–Sanyo	137	+ 3h 39' 14"	
79	Sergei Uslamin	Russia	TVM–Sanyo	58	+ 1h 39' 38"	
81	Eduardo Chozas	Spain	Artiach–Royal	43	+ 1h 14' 22"	
82	Alfonso Gutiérrez	Spain	Artiach–Royal	131	+ 3h 11' 53"	
83	José Luis Laguía	Spain	Artiach–Royal	DNF	—	
84	Santos Hernández	Spain	Artiach–Royal	39	+ 1h 07' 00"	
85	Erwin Nijboer	Netherlands	Artiach–Royal	124	+ 3h 00' 27"	
86	Joaquim Llach Ramisa	Spain	Artiach–Royal	68	+ 1h 53' 29"	
87	Manuel Pascual	Spain	Artiach–Royal	76	+ 2h 06' 25"	
88	Carmelo Miranda	Spain	Artiach–Royal	37	+ 1h 05' 33"	
89	Américo José Neves Da Silva	Portugal	Artiach–Royal	82	+ 2h 10' 14"	
91	Marco Giovannetti	Italy	Gatorade–Chateau d'Ax	4	+ 5' 19"	
92	Pello Ruiz Cabestany	Spain	Gatorade–Chateau d'Ax	13	+ 21' 55"	
93	Rudy Verdonck	Belgium	Gatorade–Chateau d'Ax	DNF	—	
94	Stefano Zanatta	Italy	Gatorade–Chateau d'Ax	122	+ 2h 56' 06"	
95	Mario Scirea	Italy	Gatorade–Chateau d'Ax	129	+ 3h 06' 25"	
96	Oscar Pelliccioli	Italy	Gatorade–Chateau d'Ax	95	+ 2h 22' 35"	
97	Andrea Chiurato	Italy	Gatorade–Chateau d'Ax	DNF	—	
98	Valerio Tebaldi	Italy	Gatorade–Chateau d'Ax	48	+ 1h 24' 00"	
99	Mauro-Antonio Santaromita	Italy	Gatorade–Chateau d'Ax	DNF	—	
101	Piotr Ugrumov	Latvia	Seur	19	+ 25' 35"	
102	Ivan Ivanov	Russia	Seur	33	+ 56' 02"	
103	Viktor Klimov	Ukraine	Seur	100	+ 2h 29' 24"	
104	Eleuterio Anguita	Spain	Seur	110	+ 2h 42' 49"	
105	Malcolm Elliott	Great Britain	Seur	115	+ 2h 49' 43"	
106	José Luis Rodríguez	Spain	Seur	90	+ 2h 18' 15"	
107	Oleg Petrovich Chuzhda	Ukraine	Seur	DNF	—	
108	José Urea	Spain	Seur	91	+ 2h 18' 55"	
109	Federico García Meliá	Spain	Seur	102	+ 2h 31' 23"	
111	Jean-Pierre Heynderickx	Belgium	Collstrop	DNF	—	
112	Paul Haghedooren	Belgium	Collstrop	78	+ 2h 06' 38"	
113	Marc Bouillon	Belgium	Collstrop	107	+ 2h 39' 45"	
114	Peter Verbeken	Belgium	Collstrop	DNF	—	
115	Daniel Beelen	Belgium	Collstrop	DNF	—	
116	Nick Botteldoorn	Belgium	Collstrop	DNF	—	
117	Laurenzo Lapage	Belgium	Collstrop	DNF	—	
118	Jan Wijnants	Belgium	Collstrop	DNF	—	
119	Klaus De Muynck	Belgium	Collstrop	130	+ 3h 07' 24"	
121	Pascal Richard	Switzerland	Lotus–Festina	DNF	—	
122	Thomas Wegmüller	Switzerland	Lotus–Festina	128	+ 3h 04' 23"	
123	Mathieu Hermans	Netherlands	Lotus–Festina	DNF	—	
124	Luc Suykerbuyk	Netherlands	Lotus–Festina	79	+ 2h 07' 05"	
125	Carlos Hernández Bailo	Spain	Lotus–Festina	22	+ 34' 39"	
126	Roberto Torres	Spain	Lotus–Festina	60	+ 1h 41' 15"	
127	Fernando Piñero	Spain	Lotus–Festina	92	+ 2h 19' 11"	
128	Luis Pérez García	Spain	Lotus–Festina	25	+ 37' 31"	
129	Roberto Pagnin	Italy	Lotus–Festina	DNF	—	
131	Franco Ballerini	Italy	GB–MG Maglificio	DNF	—	
132	Patrick Jacobs	Belgium	GB–MG Maglificio	DNF	—	
133	Miguel Arroyo	Mexico	GB–MG Maglificio	36	+ 1h 01' 00"	
134	Fabio Baldato	Italy	GB–MG Maglificio	DNF	—	
135	Joachim Halupczok	Poland	GB–MG Maglificio	64	+ 1h 46' 13"	
136	Ludwig Willems	Belgium	GB–MG Maglificio	DNF	—	
137	Laurent Pillon	France	GB–MG Maglificio	54	+ 1h 30' 42"	
138	Eduardo Rocchi	Italy	GB–MG Maglificio	DNF	—	
139	Johan Verstrepen	Belgium	GB–MG Maglificio	135	+ 3h 26' 38"	
141	Oliverio Rincón	Colombia	Kelme–Don Cafe	DNF	—	
142	José Martín Farfán	Colombia	Kelme–Don Cafe	38	+ 1h 05' 43"	
143	Néstor Mora	Colombia	Kelme–Don Cafe	35	+ 1h 00' 52"	
144	Antonio Miguel Díaz	Spain	Kelme–Don Cafe	67	+ 1h 52' 37"	
145	Asiat Saitov	Russia	Kelme–Don Cafe	72	+ 1h 59' 32"	
146	Hernán Buenahora	Colombia	Kelme–Don Cafe	17	+ 25' 24"	
147	Juan Martínez Oliver	Spain	Kelme–Don Cafe	75	+ 2h 04' 22"	
148	Julio César Cadena	Colombia	Kelme–Don Cafe	30	+ 47' 09"	
149	Bernardo González	Spain	Kelme–Don Cafe	83	+ 2h 12' 59"	
151	Javier Claramunt	Spain	Puertas Mavisa	DNF	—	
152	José Luis Díaz Díaz	Spain	Puertas Mavisa	52	+ 1h 29' 43"	
153	Juan Carlos González Salvador	Spain	Puertas Mavisa	108	+ 2h 40' 12"	
154	Manuel Guijarro Doménech	Spain	Puertas Mavisa	125	+ 3h 01' 17"	
155	Miguel Ángel Iglesias	Spain	Puertas Mavisa	DNF	—	
156	Juan Ramón Martín	Spain	Puertas Mavisa	77	+ 2h 06' 31"	
157	Casimiro Moreda	Spain	Puertas Mavisa	113	+ 2h 46' 40"	
158	José Pedrero	Spain	Puertas Mavisa	40	+ 1h 08' 20"	
159	Jesús Rodríguez Rodríguez	Spain	Puertas Mavisa	59	+ 1h 40' 58"	
161	Fernando Martínez de Guereñu	Spain	Wigarma	DNF	—	
162	Enrique Guerrikagoitia	Spain	Wigarma	DNF	—	
163	José Andrés Ripoll Jover	Spain	Wigarma	41	+ 1h 08' 35"	
164	Antonio Esparza	Spain	Wigarma	139	+ 4h 09' 16"	
165	José Fernando Pacheco Sáez	Spain	Wigarma	121	+ 2h 55' 46"	
166	Ángel Sarrapio	Spain	Wigarma	112	+ 2h 45' 38"	
167	Juan Guillén	Spain	Wigarma	DNF	—	
168	Roberto Córdoba	Spain	Wigarma	85	+ 2h 14' 40"	
169	Jesús Cruz Martín	Spain	Wigarma	74	+ 2h 00' 55"	
171	Luis Herrera	Colombia	Ryalcao–Postobón	DNF	—	
172	Álvaro Mejía	Colombia	Ryalcao–Postobón	29	+ 41' 37"	
173	Alberto Camargo	Colombia	Ryalcao–Postobón	14	+ 22' 39"	
174	William Palacio	Colombia	Ryalcao–Postobón	18	+ 25' 32"	
175	Carlos Jaramillo	Colombia	Ryalcao–Postobón	DNF	—	
176	Artūras Kasputis	Lithuania	Ryalcao–Postobón	32	+ 53' 59"	
177	Remigijus Lupeikis	Lithuania	Ryalcao–Postobón	DNF	—	
178	Naglis Ciplijauskas	Lithuania	Ryalcao–Postobón	71	+ 1h 56' 20"	
179	Arunas Cepele	Lithuania	Ryalcao–Postobón	DNF	—	
181	Edgar Corredor	Colombia	Sicasal–Acral	20	+ 27' 57"	
182	Orlando Rodrigues	Portugal	Sicasal–Acral	65	+ 1h 48' 41"	
183	Andrzej Dulas	Poland	Sicasal–Acral	81	+ 2h 08' 41"	
184	Pedro Manuel Silva Rodrigues	Portugal	Sicasal–Acral	DNF	—	
185	Fernando Manuel Mota Dos Santos	Portugal	Sicasal–Acral	70	+ 1h 55' 03"	
186	Joaquim Andrade	Portugal	Sicasal–Acral	97	+ 2h 26' 30"	
187	Jorge Manuel Silva Dos Santos	Portugal	Sicasal–Acral	DNF	—	
188	Carlos Manuel Pereira de Jesus	Portugal	Sicasal–Acral	120	+ 2h 55' 27"	
189	Serafim Vieira da Araújo	Portugal	Sicasal–Acral	46	+ 1h 21' 58"	
191	Silvio Martinello	Italy	Mercatone Uno–Medeghini–Zucchini	127	+ 3h 03' 16"	
192	Roberto Pelliconi	Italy	Mercatone Uno–Medeghini–Zucchini	133	+ 3h 19' 41"	
193	Nico Emonds	Belgium	Mercatone Uno–Medeghini–Zucchini	69	+ 1h 54' 25"	
194	Enrico Zaina	Italy	Mercatone Uno–Medeghini–Zucchini	55	+ 1h 30' 48"	
195	Bruno Leali	Italy	Mercatone Uno–Medeghini–Zucchini	89	+ 2h 18' 01"	
196	Flavio Giupponi	Italy	Mercatone Uno–Medeghini–Zucchini	101	+ 2h 29' 39"	
197	Maurizio Vandelli	Italy	Mercatone Uno–Medeghini–Zucchini	DNF	—	
198	Dario Bottaro	Italy	Mercatone Uno–Medeghini–Zucchini	126	+ 3h 02' 19"	
199	Fabio Bordonali	Italy	Mercatone Uno–Medeghini–Zucchini	87	+ 2h 17' 46"	
201	Alichere Abdourakhmanov	Russia	Russ–Baikal	DNF	—	
202	Valery Sapronov	Russia	Russ–Baikal	DNF	—	
203	Nikolai Galitchanin	Russia	Russ–Baikal	86	+ 2h 14' 41"	
204	Alexandre Lysenko	Russia	Russ–Baikal	111	+ 2h 44' 20"	
205	Oleg Ripa	Russia	Russ–Baikal	DNF	—	
206	Andrei Sitnov	Russia	Russ–Baikal	DNF	—	
207	Pavel Tonkov	Russia	Russ–Baikal	DNF	—	
208	Roustam Toukhvatoulin	Russia	Russ–Baikal	99	+ 2h 28' 45"	
209	Viatcheslav Djavanian	Russia	Russ–Baikal	114	+ 2h 49' 08"	
