= 1990 Tour de France, Prologue to Stage 10 =

Cycling race stages

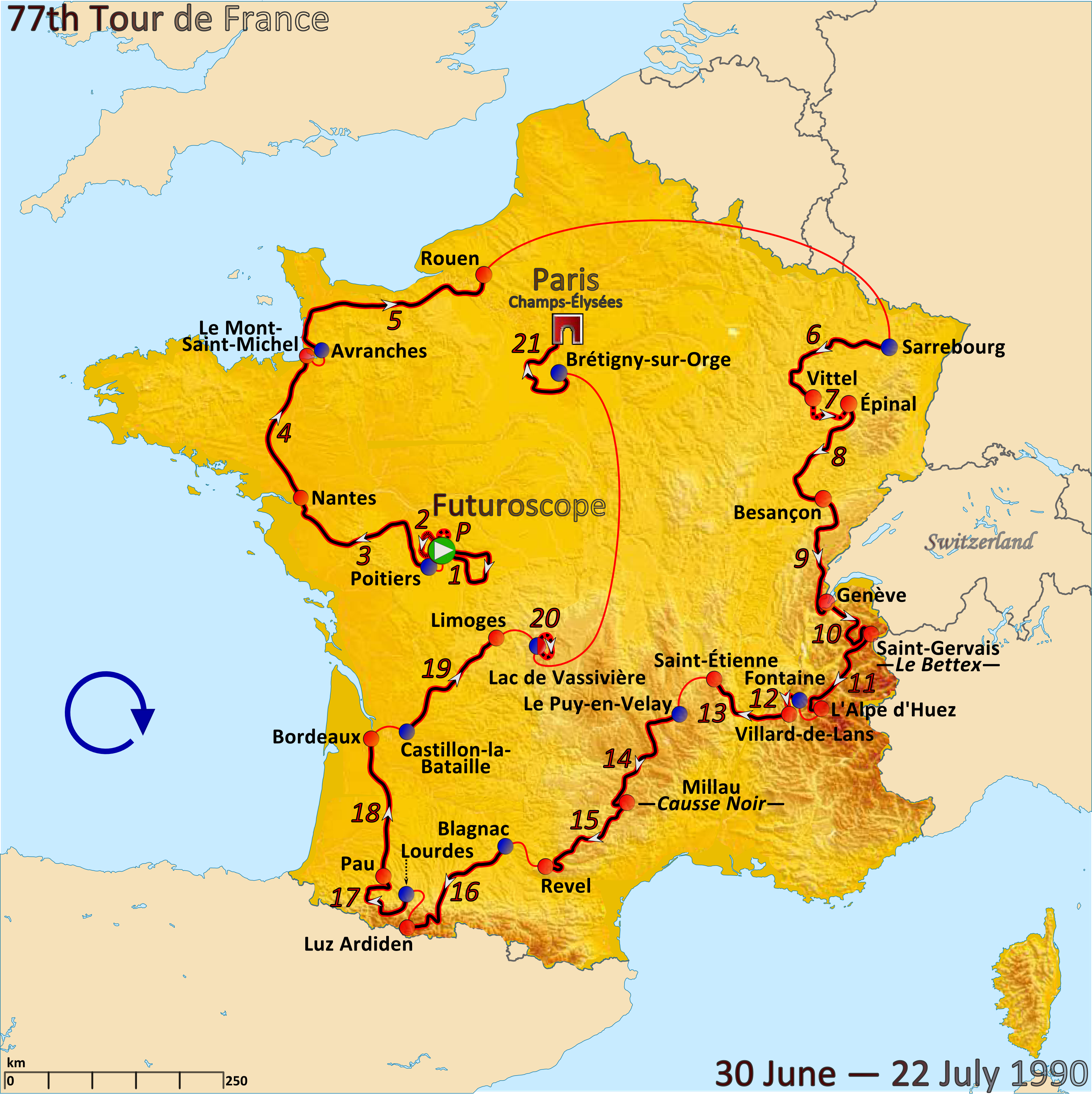
Route of the 1990 Tour de France

The 1990 Tour de France was the 77th edition of Tour de France, one of cycling's Grand Tours. The Tour began in Futuroscope with a prologue individual time trial on 30 June and Stage 10 occurred on 10 July with a mountain stage to Saint-Gervais. The race finished on the Champs-Élysées in Paris on 22 July.

== Prologue ==
30 June 1990 — Futuroscope, 6.3 km (3.9 mi) (individual time trial)

Prologue result and general classification after prologue

Rank	Rider	Team	Time
1	Thierry Marie (FRA)	Castorama–Raleigh	7' 49"
2	Greg LeMond (USA)	Z–Tomasso	+ 4"
3	Raúl Alcalá (MEX)	PDM–Concorde	s.t.
4	Francis Moreau (FRA)	Histor–Sigma	+ 10"
5	Eric Vanderaerden (BEL)	Buckler–Colnago–Decca	+ 12"
6	Viatcheslav Ekimov (URS)	Panasonic–Sportlife	+ 13"
7	Pello Ruiz Cabestany (ESP)	ONCE	+ 17"
8	Miguel Induráin (ESP)	Banesto	s.t.
9	Jelle Nijdam (NED)	Buckler–Colnago–Decca	+ 18"
10	Stephen Roche (IRL)	Histor–Sigma	s.t.

== Stage 1 ==
1 July 1990 — Futuroscope to Futuroscope, 138.5 km (86.1 mi)

Stage 1 result

Rank	Rider	Team	Time
1	Frans Maassen (NED)	Buckler–Colnago–Decca	3h 19' 01"
2	Ronan Pensec (FRA)	Z–Tomasso	s.t.
3	Claudio Chiappucci (ITA)	Carrera Jeans–Vagabond	s.t.
4	Steve Bauer (CAN)	7-Eleven–Hoonved	s.t.
5	John Carlsen (DEN)	Toshiba	+ 8' 36"
6	Guido Winterberg (SUI)	Helvetia–La Suisse	+ 9' 24"
7	Olaf Ludwig (DDR)	Panasonic–Sportlife	+ 10' 35"
8	Jean-Paul van Poppel (NED)	Panasonic–Sportlife	s.t.
9	Giovanni Fidanza (ITA)	Chateau d'Ax	s.t.
10	Djamolidine Abdoujaparov (URS)	Alfa Lum	s.t.

General classification after stage 1

Rank	Rider	Team	Time
1	Steve Bauer (CAN)	7-Eleven–Hoonved	3h 27' 01"
2	Frans Maassen (NED)	Buckler–Colnago–Decca	+ 2"
3	Claudio Chiappucci (ITA)	Carrera Jeans–Vagabond	+ 9"
4	Ronan Pensec (FRA)	Z–Tomasso	+ 21"
5	John Carlsen (DEN)	Toshiba	+ 9' 03"
6	Guido Winterberg (SUI)	Helvetia–La Suisse	+ 9' 44"
7	Thierry Marie (FRA)	Castorama–Raleigh	+ 10' 24"
8	Greg LeMond (USA)	Z–Tomasso	+ 10' 28"
9	Raúl Alcalá (MEX)	PDM–Concorde	s.t.
10	Francis Moreau (FRA)	Histor–Sigma	+ 10' 34"

== Stage 2 ==
1 July 1990 — Futuroscope to Futuroscope, 44.5 km (27.7 mi) (team time trial)

Stage 2 result

Rank	Team	Time
1	Panasonic–Sportlife	53' 24"
2	PDM–Concorde	+ 7"
3	ONCE	+ 22"
4	Histor–Sigma	s.t.
5	Castorama–Raleigh	+ 33"
6	7-Eleven–Hoonved	+ 48"
7	Z–Tomasso	+ 53"
8	Buckler–Colnago–Decca	+ 56"
9	Helvetia–La Suisse	+ 1' 15"
10	Weinmann–SMM Uster	+ 1' 18"

General classification after stage 2

Rank	Rider	Team	Time
1	Steve Bauer (CAN)	7-Eleven–Hoonved	4h 21' 13"
2	Frans Maassen (NED)	Buckler–Colnago–Decca	+ 10"
3	Ronan Pensec (FRA)	Z–Tomasso	+ 26"
4	Claudio Chiappucci (ITA)	Carrera Jeans–Vagabond	+ 50"
5	Raúl Alcalá (MEX)	PDM–Concorde	+ 9' 47"
6	Viatcheslav Ekimov (URS)	Panasonic–Sportlife	+ 9' 49"
7	Steven Rooks (NED)	Panasonic–Sportlife	+ 10' 01"
8	Sean Kelly (IRL)	PDM–Concorde	s.t.
9	Eric Van Lancker (BEL)	Panasonic–Sportlife	+ 10' 03"
10	Allan Peiper (AUS)	Panasonic–Sportlife	s.t.

== Stage 3 ==
2 July 1990 — Poitiers to Nantes, 228.0 km (141.7 mi)

Stage 3 result

Rank	Rider	Team	Time
1	Moreno Argentin (ITA)	Ariostea	5h 46' 13"
2	Christophe Lavainne (FRA)	Castorama–Raleigh	+ 2' 29"
3	Uwe Raab (DDR)	PDM–Concorde	s.t.
4	Olaf Ludwig (DDR)	Panasonic–Sportlife	s.t.
5	Johan Capiot (BEL)	TVM	s.t.
6	Sean Kelly (IRL)	PDM–Concorde	s.t.
7	Jelle Nijdam (NED)	Buckler–Colnago–Decca	s.t.
8	Søren Lilholt (DEN)	Histor–Sigma	s.t.
9	Asiat Saitov (URS)	Alfa Lum	s.t.
10	Marc Sergeant (BEL)	Panasonic–Sportlife	s.t.

General classification after stage 3

Rank	Rider	Team	Time
1	Steve Bauer (CAN)	7-Eleven–Hoonved	10h 09' 55"
2	Frans Maassen (NED)	Buckler–Colnago–Decca	+ 8"
3	Ronan Pensec (FRA)	Z–Tomasso	+ 26"
4	Claudio Chiappucci (ITA)	Carrera Jeans–Vagabond	+ 50"
5	Moreno Argentin (ITA)	Ariostea	+ 8' 23"
6	Raúl Alcalá (MEX)	PDM–Concorde	+ 9' 47"
7	Viatcheslav Ekimov (URS)	Panasonic–Sportlife	+ 9' 49"
8	Steven Rooks (NED)	Panasonic–Sportlife	+ 10' 01"
9	Sean Kelly (IRL)	PDM–Concorde	s.t.
10	Eric Van Lancker (BEL)	Panasonic–Sportlife	+ 10' 03"

== Stage 4 ==
3 July 1990 — Nantes to Mont Saint-Michel, 203.0 km (126.1 mi)

Stage 4 result

Rank	Rider	Team	Time
1	Johan Museeuw (BEL)	Lotto–Superclub	5h 23' 33"
2	Guido Bontempi (ITA)	Carrera Jeans–Vagabond	s.t.
3	Olaf Ludwig (DDR)	Panasonic–Sportlife	s.t.
4	Davis Phinney (USA)	7-Eleven–Hoonved	s.t.
5	Adriano Baffi (ITA)	Ariostea	s.t.
6	Johan Capiot (BEL)	TVM	s.t.
7	Sean Kelly (IRL)	PDM–Concorde	s.t.
8	Jean-Paul van Poppel (NED)	Panasonic–Sportlife	s.t.
9	Etienne De Wilde (BEL)	Histor–Sigma	s.t.
10	Martin Schalkers (NED)	TVM	s.t.

General classification after stage 4

Rank	Rider	Team	Time
1	Steve Bauer (CAN)	7-Eleven–Hoonved	15h 33' 24"
2	Ronan Pensec (FRA)	Z–Tomasso	+ 30"
3	Frans Maassen (NED)	Buckler–Colnago–Decca	+ 33"
4	Claudio Chiappucci (ITA)	Carrera Jeans–Vagabond	+ 1' 01"
5	Moreno Argentin (ITA)	Ariostea	+ 8' 27"
6	Raúl Alcalá (MEX)	PDM–Concorde	+ 9' 58"
7	Steven Rooks (NED)	Panasonic–Sportlife	+ 10' 05"
8	Sean Kelly (IRL)	PDM–Concorde	s.t.
9	Eric Van Lancker (BEL)	Panasonic–Sportlife	+ 10' 14"
10	Allan Peiper (AUS)	Panasonic–Sportlife	s.t.

== Stage 5 ==
4 July 1990 — Avranches to Rouen, 301.0 km (187.0 mi)

Stage 5 result

Rank	Rider	Team	Time
1	Gerrit Solleveld (NED)	Buckler–Colnago–Decca	7h 43' 07"
2	Johan Museeuw (BEL)	Lotto–Superclub	+ 4' 27"
3	Etienne De Wilde (BEL)	Histor–Sigma	s.t.
4	Olaf Ludwig (DDR)	Panasonic–Sportlife	+ 4' 30"
5	Eric Vanderaerden (BEL)	Buckler–Colnago–Decca	s.t.
6	Adriano Baffi (ITA)	Ariostea	s.t.
7	Davis Phinney (USA)	7-Eleven–Hoonved	s.t.
8	Sean Kelly (IRL)	PDM–Concorde	s.t.
9	Søren Lilholt (DEN)	Histor–Sigma	s.t.
10	Adri van der Poel (NED)	Weinmann–SMM Uster	s.t.

General classification after stage 5

Rank	Rider	Team	Time
1	Steve Bauer (CAN)	7-Eleven–Hoonved	23h 20' 57"
2	Ronan Pensec (FRA)	Z–Tomasso	+ 34"
3	Frans Maassen (NED)	Buckler–Colnago–Decca	+ 37"
4	Claudio Chiappucci (ITA)	Carrera Jeans–Vagabond	+ 1' 05"
5	Gerrit Solleveld (NED)	Buckler–Colnago–Decca	+ 7' 26"
6	Raúl Alcalá (MEX)	PDM–Concorde	+ 10' 02"
7	Sean Kelly (IRL)	PDM–Concorde	+ 10' 03"
8	Steven Rooks (NED)	Panasonic–Sportlife	+ 10' 09"
9	Allan Peiper (AUS)	Panasonic–Sportlife	+ 10' 16"
10	Guy Nulens (BEL)	Panasonic–Sportlife	s.t.

== Stage 6 ==
6 July 1990 — Sarrebourg to Vittel, 202.5 km (125.8 mi)

Stage 6 result

Rank	Rider	Team	Time
1	Jelle Nijdam (NED)	Buckler–Colnago–Decca	5h 23' 56"
2	Jesper Skibby (DEN)	TVM	s.t.
3	Johan Museeuw (BEL)	Lotto–Superclub	s.t.
4	Giovanni Fidanza (ITA)	Chateau d'Ax	s.t.
5	Viatcheslav Ekimov (URS)	Panasonic–Sportlife	s.t.
6	Guy Nulens (BEL)	Panasonic–Sportlife	+ 3"
7	Adriano Baffi (ITA)	Ariostea	+ 8"
8	Olaf Ludwig (DDR)	Panasonic–Sportlife	s.t.
9	Adri van der Poel (NED)	Weinmann–SMM Uster	s.t.
10	Djamolidine Abdoujaparov (URS)	Alfa Lum	s.t.

General classification after stage 6

Rank	Rider	Team	Time
1	Steve Bauer (CAN)	7-Eleven–Hoonved	28h 45' 01"
2	Ronan Pensec (FRA)	Z–Tomasso	+ 34"
3	Frans Maassen (NED)	Buckler–Colnago–Decca	+ 37"
4	Claudio Chiappucci (ITA)	Carrera Jeans–Vagabond	+ 1' 05"
5	Gerrit Solleveld (NED)	Buckler–Colnago–Decca	+ 7' 26"
6	Raúl Alcalá (MEX)	PDM–Concorde	+ 10' 02"
7	Sean Kelly (IRL)	PDM–Concorde	+ 10' 03"
8	Steven Rooks (NED)	Panasonic–Sportlife	+ 10' 09"
9	Guy Nulens (BEL)	Panasonic–Sportlife	+ 10' 11"
10	Allan Peiper (AUS)	Panasonic–Sportlife	+ 10' 16"

== Stage 7 ==
7 July 1990 — Vittel to Épinal, 61.5 km (38.2 mi) (individual time trial)

Stage 7 result

Rank	Rider	Team	Time
1	Raúl Alcalá (MEX)	PDM–Concorde	1h 17' 05"
2	Miguel Induráin (ESP)	Banesto	+ 1' 24"
3	Gianni Bugno (ITA)	Chateau d'Ax	+ 1' 47"
4	Pedro Delgado (ESP)	Banesto	+2' 05"
5	Greg LeMond (USA)	Z–Tomasso	+ 2' 11"
6	Jean-François Bernard (FRA)	Toshiba	+ 2' 26"
7	Ronan Pensec (FRA)	Z–Tomasso	s.t.
8	Uwe Ampler (DDR)	PDM–Concorde	+ 2' 30"
9	Tony Rominger (SUI)	Chateau d'Ax	+ 2' 32"
10	Gerrit Solleveld (NED)	Buckler–Colnago–Decca	+ 2' 40"

General classification after stage 7

Rank	Rider	Team	Time
1	Steve Bauer (CAN)	7-Eleven–Hoonved	30h 04' 49"
2	Ronan Pensec (FRA)	Z–Tomasso	+ 17"
3	Claudio Chiappucci (ITA)	Carrera Jeans–Vagabond	+ 1' 11"
4	Frans Maassen (NED)	Buckler–Colnago–Decca	+ 1' 16"
5	Raúl Alcalá (MEX)	PDM–Concorde	+ 7' 19"
6	Gerrit Solleveld (NED)	Buckler–Colnago–Decca	+ 7' 23"
7	Greg LeMond (USA)	Z–Tomasso	+ 10' 09"
8	Uwe Ampler (DDR)	PDM–Concorde	+ 10' 14"
9	Sean Kelly (IRL)	PDM–Concorde	+ 10' 15"
10	Viatcheslav Ekimov (URS)	Panasonic–Sportlife	+ 10' 26"

== Stage 8 ==
8 July 1990 — Épinal to Besançon, 181.5 km (112.8 mi)

Stage 8 result

Rank	Rider	Team	Time
1	Olaf Ludwig (DDR)	Panasonic–Sportlife	4h 26' 53"
2	Johan Museeuw (BEL)	Lotto–Superclub	s.t.
3	Ron Kiefel (USA)	7-Eleven–Hoonved	s.t.
4	Jean-Claude Colotti (FRA)	RMO–Mavic–Liberia	s.t.
5	Andreas Kappes (FRG)	Toshiba	s.t.
6	Christophe Lavainne (FRA)	Castorama–Raleigh	s.t.
7	Guido Winterberg (SUI)	Helvetia–La Suisse	s.t.
8	Massimo Ghirotto (ITA)	Carrera Jeans–Vagabond	s.t.
9	Pascal Lance (FRA)	Toshiba	s.t.
10	Patrick Jacobs (BEL)	TVM	s.t.

General classification after stage 8

Rank	Rider	Team	Time
1	Steve Bauer (CAN)	7-Eleven–Hoonved	34h 32' 03"
2	Ronan Pensec (FRA)	Z–Tomasso	+ 17"
3	Claudio Chiappucci (ITA)	Carrera Jeans–Vagabond	+ 1' 07"
4	Frans Maassen (NED)	Buckler–Colnago–Decca	+ 1' 16"
5	Raúl Alcalá (MEX)	PDM–Concorde	+ 7' 19"
6	Gerrit Solleveld (NED)	Buckler–Colnago–Decca	+ 7' 23"
7	Greg LeMond (USA)	Z–Tomasso	+ 10' 09"
8	Uwe Ampler (DDR)	PDM–Concorde	+ 10' 14"
9	Sean Kelly (IRL)	PDM–Concorde	+ 10' 15"
10	Guido Winterberg (SUI)	Helvetia–La Suisse	+ 10' 26"

== Stage 9 ==
9 July 1990 — Besançon to Geneva, 196.0 km (121.8 mi)

Stage 9 result

Rank	Rider	Team	Time
1	Massimo Ghirotto (ITA)	Carrera Jeans–Vagabond	4h 46' 07"
2	Eduardo Chozas (ESP)	ONCE	s.t.
3	Christophe Lavainne (FRA)	Castorama–Raleigh	+ 16"
4	Brian Holm (DEN)	Histor–Sigma	+ 19"
5	Philippe Louviot (FRA)	Toshiba	s.t.
6	Jörg Müller (SUI)	TVM	s.t.
7	Gilles Delion (FRA)	Helvetia–La Suisse	+ 25"
8	Giuseppe Calcaterra (ITA)	Chateau d'Ax	+ 27"
9	Bjarne Riis (DEN)	Castorama–Raleigh	s.t.
10	Andreas Kappes (FRG)	Toshiba	s.t.

General classification after stage 9

Rank	Rider	Team	Time
1	Steve Bauer (CAN)	7-Eleven–Hoonved	39h 18' 47"
2	Ronan Pensec (FRA)	Z–Tomasso	+ 17"
3	Frans Maassen (NED)	Buckler–Colnago–Decca	+ 1' 06"
4	Claudio Chiappucci (ITA)	Carrera Jeans–Vagabond	+ 1' 07"
5	Raúl Alcalá (MEX)	PDM–Concorde	+ 7' 19"
6	Greg LeMond (USA)	Z–Tomasso	+ 10' 09"
7	Uwe Ampler (DDR)	PDM–Concorde	+ 10' 14"
8	Sean Kelly (IRL)	PDM–Concorde	+ 10' 15"
9	Guido Winterberg (SUI)	Helvetia–La Suisse	+ 10' 26"
10	Viatcheslav Ekimov (URS)	Panasonic–Sportlife	s.t.

== Stage 10 ==
10 July 1990 — Geneva to Saint-Gervais Mont Blanc, 118.5 km (73.6 mi)

Stage 10 result

Rank	Rider	Team	Time
1	Thierry Claveyrolat (FRA)	RMO–Mavic–Liberia	3h 24' 31"
2	Uwe Ampler (DDR)	PDM–Concorde	+ 1' 54"
3	Charly Mottet (FRA)	RMO–Mavic–Liberia	s.t.
4	Reynel Montoya (COL)	Ryalcao–Postobón	+ 2' 10"
5	Marino Lejarreta (ESP)	ONCE	s.t.
6	Éric Boyer (FRA)	Z–Tomasso	s.t.
7	Pedro Delgado (ESP)	Banesto	s.t.
8	Guido Winterberg (SUI)	Helvetia–La Suisse	+ 2' 11"
9	Roberto Conti (ITA)	Ariostea	+ 2' 24"
10	Greg LeMond (USA)	Z–Tomasso	+ 2' 29"

General classification after stage 10

Rank	Rider	Team	Time
1	Ronan Pensec (FRA)	Z–Tomasso	42h 46' 04"
2	Claudio Chiappucci (ITA)	Carrera Jeans–Vagabond	+ 50"
3	Steve Bauer (CAN)	7-Eleven–Hoonved	+ 1' 21"
4	Frans Maassen (NED)	Buckler–Colnago–Decca	+ 2' 27"
5	Raúl Alcalá (MEX)	PDM–Concorde	+ 7' 02"
6	Uwe Ampler (DDR)	PDM–Concorde	+ 9' 22"
7	Guido Winterberg (SUI)	Helvetia–La Suisse	+ 9' 51"
8	Greg LeMond (USA)	Z–Tomasso	+ 9' 52"
9	Sean Kelly (IRL)	PDM–Concorde	+ 9' 58"
10	Erik Breukink (NED)	PDM–Concorde	+ 10' 15"
