= Golovatenko =

Golovatenko is a Russian-language surname Головатенко. Notable people with the surname include:

- Jekaterina Golovatenko (born 1979), Estonian former competitive figure skater
- Nikolai Golovatenko (born 1963), Soviet former racing cyclist
