= 1989 Omloop Het Volk =

Race details
- Dates: 4 March 1989
- Stages: 1
- Distance: 244 km (152 mi)
- Winning time: 6h 46' 00"

Results
	Winner	Etienne De Wilde (BEL)
	Second	Sean Kelly (IRL)
	Third	Remig Stumpf (FRG)

The 1989 Omloop Het Volk was the 43rd edition of the Omloop Het Volk cycle race and was held on 4 March 1989. The race started and finished in Sint-Amandsberg. The race was won by Etienne De Wilde.

== General classification ==
Final general classification
Rank	Rider	Time
1	Etienne De Wilde (BEL)	6h 46' 00"
2	Sean Kelly (IRL)	+ 5"
3	Remig Stumpf (FRG)	+ 5"
4	Jean-Claude Colotti (FRA)	+ 5"
5	Eric Vanderaerden (BEL)	+ 5"
6	Othmar Haefliger (SUI)	+ 5"
7	Steve Bauer (CAN)	+ 5"
8	Ludo Peeters (BEL)	+ 5"
9	Ad Wijnands (NED)	+ 5"
10	Patrick Verschueren (BEL)	+ 5"
