= Pablo Moreno (cyclist) =

Spanish cyclist

Personal information
- Full name: Pablo Moreno Rebollo
- Born: 19 August 1963 (age 63) Arganda del Rey, Spain

Cycling career
- Sport: Cycling
- Discipline: Road
- Role: Rider

Professional team
- 1988–1992: Seur–Campagnolo–Bic

Pablo Moreno (born 19 August 1963) is a Spanish former racing cyclist. He rode in the 1990 Tour de France, the 1992 Giro d'Italia and four editions of the Vuelta a España.
