= Antonio Espejo (cyclist) =

Spanish cyclist (born 1968)

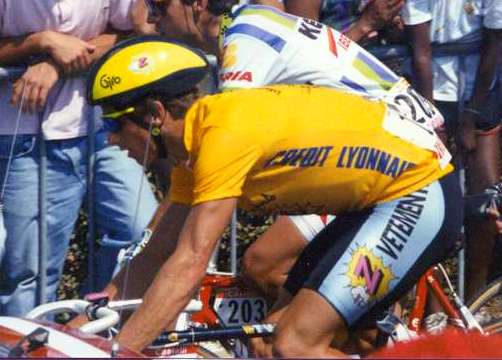

Personal information
- Full name: Antonio Espejo Ruiz
- Born: 5 April 1968 (age 58) Montilla, Spain

Cycling career
- Sport: Cycling
- Current team: Retired
- Discipline: Road
- Role: Rider

Professional teams
- 1990–1991: Kelme–Ibexpress
- 1992: Puertas Mavisa

Antonio Espejo (born 5 April 1968) is a Spanish former racing cyclist. He rode in the 1990 Tour de France.
