= Mario Lara =

Spanish cyclist

Personal information
- Full name: Mario Lara Galindo
- Born: 8 April 1966 (age 60) Ronda, Spain

Cycling career
- Sport: Cycling
- Discipline: Road
- Role: Rider

Professional team
- 1990–1991: Kelme–Ibexpress

Mario Lara (born 8 April 1966) is a Spanish former racing cyclist. He rode in the 1990 Tour de France.
