= Alexandre Trubine =

Russian cyclist

Personal information
- Born: 8 June 1966 (age 60)

Cycling career
- Sport: Cycling
- Role: Rider

Alexandre Trubine (born 8 June 1966) is a Russian racing cyclist. He rode in the 1990 Tour de France.
