= Vicente Ridaura =

Spanish cyclist

Personal information
- Born: 22 August 1963 (age 63) Valencia, Spain

Cycling career
- Sport: Cycling
- Discipline: Road
- Role: Rider

Professional teams
- 1985–1988: Orbea–Gin MG
- 1989–1990: Seur
- 1991–1993: Artiach–Royal

Vicente Ridaura (born 22 August 1963) is a Spanish former professional racing cyclist. He rode in three editions of the Tour de France, two editions of the Giro d'Italia and four editions of the Vuelta a España.

== Major results ==
1986
1st Memorial Manuel Galera
1st Stage 9 Vuelta a Castilla y León
7th Trofeo Masferrer
1987
2nd Clásica a los Puertos de Guadarrama
1988
3rd Klasika Primavera
1989
1st Overall Tour of Galicia

1st Stage 3

6th Overall Volta a Portugal
1991
3rd Overall Volta a Portugal

1st Stage 4

5th Overall Vuelta a los Valles Mineros
1992
1st Stage 9 Volta a Portugal

=== Grand Tour general classification results timeline ===
Grand Tour	1986	1987	1988	1989	1990	1991	1992	1993
Vuelta a España	—	DNF	24	DNF	—	DNF	—	—
Giro d'Italia	—	—	—	—	72	—	—	102
Tour de France	87	107	—	63	—	—	—	—
