= Othmar Haefliger =

Swiss cyclist (born 1963)

Personal information
- Born: 18 March 1963 (age 63) Unterägeri, Switzerland

Cycling career
- Sport: Cycling
- Current team: Retired
- Discipline: Road
- Role: Rider

Professional teams
- 1986–1987: La Vie Claire
- 1988–1990: Weinmann–La Suisse–SMM Uster

Othmar Haefliger (born 18 March 1963) is a Swiss racing cyclist. He rode in the 1990 Tour de France and the 1987 Giro d'Italia.

== Major results ==
1986
1st Stage 4 GP Tell
1987
3rd GP du canton d'Argovie
3rd Wartenberg Rundfahrt
7th Tour du Nord-Ouest
8th Overall Circuit Cycliste Sarthe

1st Stage 5

8th Züri-Metzgete
1988
7th GP du canton d'Argovie
1989
1st Stage 5 Tour of Galicia
1st Stage 1b Route du Sud
6th Omloop Het Volk
