= Guido Winterberg =

Swiss cyclist

Personal information
- Born: 19 October 1962 (age 63) Sursee, Switzerland

Cycling career
- Sport: Cycling
- Discipline: Road
- Role: Rider

Professional teams
- 1985–1987: La Vie Claire
- 1988–1992: Weinmann–La Suisse–SMM Uster

Guido Winterberg (born 19 October 1962) is a Swiss former professional racing cyclist. He rode in five editions of the Tour de France.

== Major results ==
1984
1st Overall Grand Prix Guillaume Tell

1st Stages 1, 3, 4 & 6 (ITT)

1985
1st Overall Circuit Franco-Belge
1st GP Brissago
1st Stage 4 (TTT) Tour de l'Avenir
3rd Overall Tour de Suisse

1st Stage 2

1986
1st Stage 8 Tour de Suisse
2nd Overall Grand Prix Guillaume Tell

1st Stage 2a

3rd Overall Setmana Catalana de Ciclisme

1st Stage 4a (ITT)

8th Overall Tour de la Communauté Européenne
1987
1st Overall Grand Prix Guillaume Tell
3rd Overall Etoile de Bessèges
7th Overall Tirreno–Adriatico
1988
1st Wartenberg Rundfahrt
2nd Road race, National Road Championships
8th Tour du Nord-Ouest
1989
2nd Grand Prix La Marseillaise
3rd GP Lugano
8th Overall Tour of Britain
10th Overall Etoile de Bessèges
1992
6th Overall Tour DuPont
