= José Salvador Sanchis =

Spanish cyclist (born 1963)

Personal information
- Born: 26 March 1963 (age 63) Genovés, Valencia, Spain

Cycling career
- Sport: Cycling
- Current team: Retired
- Discipline: Road
- Role: Rider

Professional teams
- 1985–1989: Seat–Orbea
- 1990–1991: Seur

José Salvador Sanchis (born 26 March 1963) is a Spanish former professional racing cyclist. He rode in four editions of the Tour de France, two editions of the Giro d'Italia and five editions of the Vuelta a España. He also competed in the men's road race at the 1984 Summer Olympics.

== Major results ==
1982
1st Vuelta a Murcia
1986
1st Stage 5a Vuelta a Cantabria
1989
5th Road race, National Road Championships
1991
3rd Circuito de Getxo

=== Grand Tour general classification results timeline ===
Grand Tour	1985	1986	1987	1988	1989	1990	1991
Giro d'Italia	—	—	—	—	24	—	DNF
Tour de France	128	DNF	35	111	—	—	—
Vuelta a España	—	62	61	—	48	DNF	70

Legend
—	Did not compete
DNF	Did not finish
