= Jos van Aert =

Dutch cyclist (born 1962)

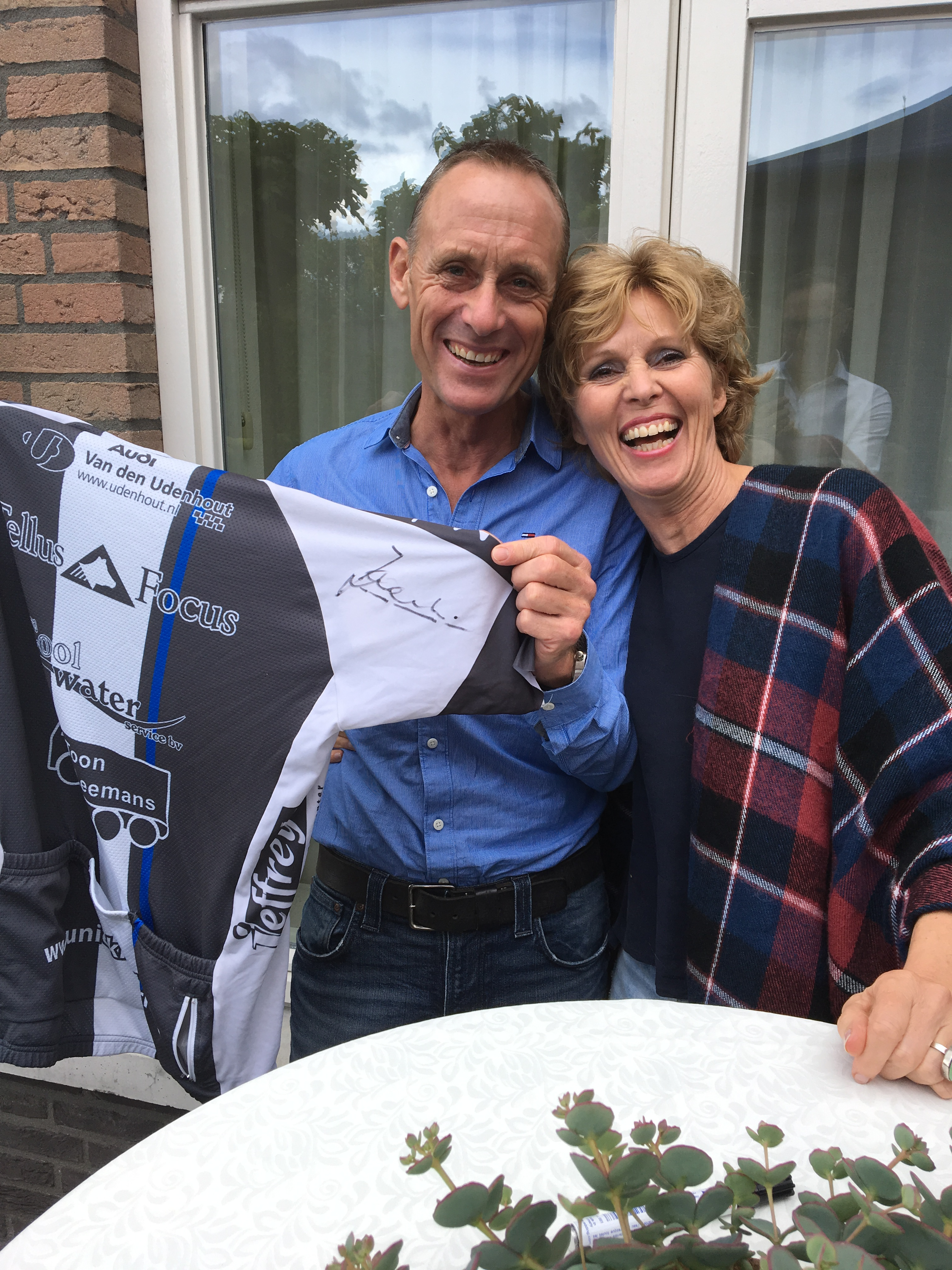

Personal information
- Born: 26 August 1962 (age 64) Rijsbergen, Netherlands

Cycling career
- Sport: Cycling
- Role: Rider

Jos van Aert (born 26 August 1962) is a Dutch former racing cyclist. He rode in six Grand Tours between 1989 and 1993. He is a cousin of the father of Belgian racing cyclist Wout van Aert.
