= Roque de la Cruz (cyclist) =

Spanish cyclist (born 1964)

Personal information
- Born: 13 December 1964 (age 61) Cenizate, Spain

Cycling career
- Sport: Cycling
- Role: Rider

Roque de la Cruz (born 13 December 1964) is a Spanish former professional racing cyclist. He rode in three editions of the Tour de France, one edition of the Giro d'Italia and two editions of the Vuelta a España.
