= William Pulido =

Colombian cyclist

Personal information
- Born: 23 February 1965 (age 61) Villavicencio, Colombia

Cycling career
- Sport: Cycling
- Role: Rider

William Pulido (born 23 February 1965) is a Colombian former racing cyclist. He rode in the 1990 Tour de France.
