= Hansruedi Märki =

Swiss cyclist (born 1960)

Personal information
- Born: 18 June 1960 (age 66) Handbach, Switzerland

Cycling career
- Sport: Cycling

Hansruedi Märki (born 18 June 1960) is a Swiss former cyclist. He competed in the team pursuit event at the 1984 Summer Olympics.
