= Jos Haex =

Belgian cyclist (born 1959)

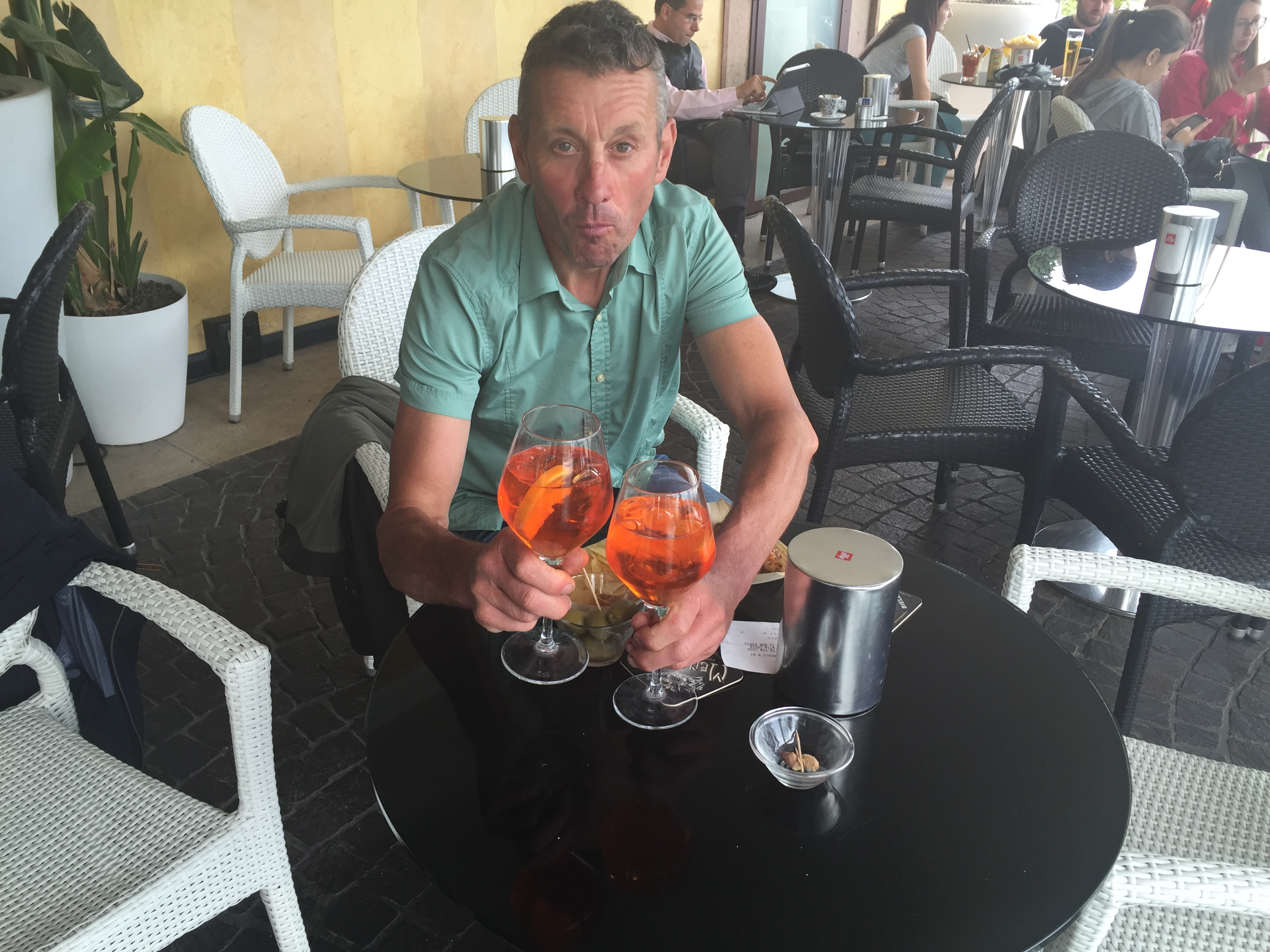

Personal information
- Born: 19 August 1959 (age 67) Meeuwen-Gruitrode, Belgium

Cycling career
- Sport: Cycling
- Role: Rider

Jos Haex (born 19 August 1959) is a former Belgian racing cyclist. He rode in five editions of the Tour de France between 1986 and 1990.
