= Javier Duch =

Spanish cyclist (born 1964)

Personal information
- Born: 23 June 1964 (age 62)

Cycling career
- Sport: Cycling
- Role: Rider

Javier Duch (born 23 June 1964) is a Spanish racing cyclist. He rode in the 1991 Tour de France and scored the 122nd position.
