= Kurt Steinmann =

Swiss cyclist

Personal information
- Born: 3 November 1962 (age 63)

Cycling career
- Sport: Cycling
- Role: Rider

Kurt Steinmann (born 3 November 1962) is a Swiss racing cyclist. He rode in the 1990 Tour de France.
