= José Rodríguez (cyclist) =

Spanish cyclist

Personal information
- Full name: José Rodríguez García
- Born: 30 April 1966 (age 60) Madrid, Spain

Cycling career
- Sport: Cycling
- Current team: Retired
- Discipline: Road
- Role: Rider

Professional teams
- 1989–1992: Seur
- 1993–1994: Deportpublic
- 1995–1998: Kelme–Sureña

José Rodríguez García (born 30 April 1966) is a Spanish former cyclist. He competed in the team time trial at the 1988 Summer Olympics.

== Major results ==
1991
1st Overall Vuelta a Castilla y León

1st Stage 2

2nd Clásica Internacional de Alcobendas
2nd National Road Race Championships
1992
2nd Mémorial Manuel Galera
1993
1st Trofeo Masferrer
1994
3rd Overall Vuelta a Aragón
3rd Circuito de Getxo
1995
1st Stage 4 Vuelta a Burgos
1997
1st GP Llodio
