= Patrick Jacobs =

Belgian cyclist

Personal information
- Born: 25 July 1962 (age 64) Halle, Belgium

Cycling career
- Sport: Cycling
- Role: Rider

Patrick Jacobs (born 25 July 1962) is a former Belgian racing cyclist. He rode in four editions of the Tour de France between 1987 and 1991.
