= José Urea =

Spanish cyclist (born 1967)

Personal information
- Full name: José Urea Pulido
- Born: 6 July 1967 (age 59) Jaén, Spain

Cycling career
- Sport: Cycling
- Current team: Retired
- Discipline: Road
- Role: Rider

Professional team
- 1988–1992: Seur–Campagnolo–Bic

José Urea (born 6 July 1967) is a Spanish former racing cyclist. He rode in the 1990 Tour de France as well as two editions of the Giro d'Italia and Vuelta a España.

== Major results ==
1989
1st Stage 11 Volta a Portugal
3rd Overall Volta ao Alentejo
1999
2nd Overall Vuelta a Navarra
