= Alessandro Giannelli =

Italian cyclist

Personal information
- Born: 9 August 1963 (age 63) Seravezza, Italy

Cycling career
- Sport: Cycling
- Discipline: Road
- Role: Rider

Professional teams
- 1986–1987: Magniflex–Centroscarpa
- 1988–1989: Alba Cucine–Benotto
- 1990–1994: Carrera Jeans–Vagabond

Alessandro Giannelli (born 9 August 1963) is an Italian former racing cyclist. He rode in three editions of the Tour de France, two editions of the Vuelta a España, and five editions of the Giro d'Italia.

== Major results ==
1991
2nd Coppa Bernocchi
8th Tre Valli Varesine
1992
1st Giro del Friuli
1st Stage 4 Clásico RCN

=== Grand Tour general classification results timeline ===
Grand Tour	1986	1987	1988	1989	1990	1991	1992
Giro d'Italia	DNF	42	DNF	—	—	27	71
Tour de France	—	—	—	—	69	40	DNF
Vuelta a España	—	—	DNF	67	—	—	—

Legend
—	Did not compete
DNF	Did not finish
