= Jan Siemons =

Dutch cyclist

Personal information
- Born: 26 May 1964 (age 62) Zundert, Netherlands

Cycling career
- Sport: Cycling
- Role: Rider

Jan Siemons (born 26 May 1964) is a Dutch former racing cyclist. He rode in the Giro d'Italia and the Tour de France.
