= Vasily Zhdanov =

Soviet cyclist

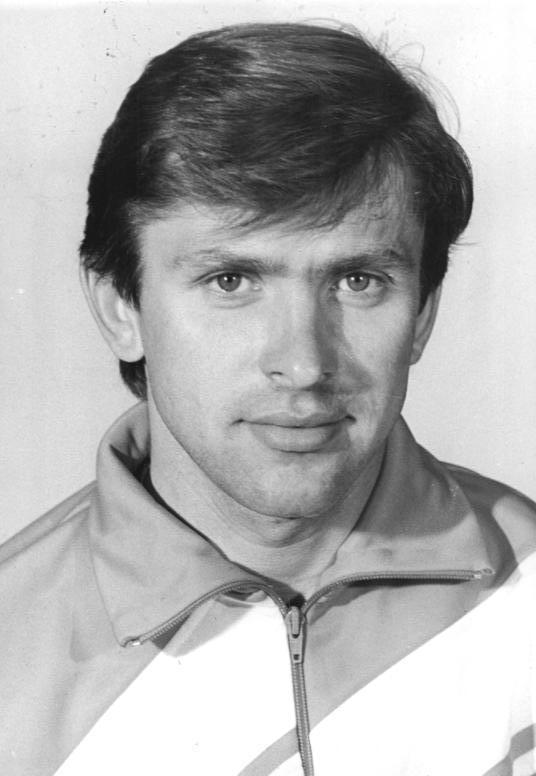
- Vasily Zhdanov in 1987

Personal information
- Born: 12 January 1963 (age 63) Zalomnoye, Belgorod Oblast, Russian SFSR, Soviet Union
- Height: 1.81 m (5 ft 11 in)
- Weight: 77 kg (170 lb)

Sport
- Sport: Cycling
- Club: Soviet Army
Medal record
Representing the Soviet Union
World Championships
Gold medal – first place	1985 Giavera del Montello	Team time trial

Vasily Ivanovich Zhdanov (Russian: Василий Иванович Жданов; born 12 January 1963) is a retired Soviet road cyclist. He was part of the Soviet team that won the 100 km team time trial at the 1985 World Championships. He competed in the same event at the 1988 Summer Olympics and finished in seventh place. The same year he won the Milk Race.

Zhdanov was born in Russia, but in 1987 graduated from the University of Physical Education in Kiyv (Kharkiv branch), Ukraine, and since the 1980s took various sport and business related positions in Kharkiv and Kiyv. Between 1994 and 1996 he was the head coach of the Ukrainian road racing team, then until 2005 he was a personal assistant of Oleg Blokhin in Ukraine's parliament matters. Between 2005 and 2010 he was responsible for sport and tourism in the city administration of Kharkiv. Since 2011 he is an assistant manager of the Italian racing team Lampre-Merida.
