= Maurizio Piovani =

Italian cyclist

Personal information
- Born: 17 July 1959 (age 67) Cremona, Italy

Cycling career
- Sport: Cycling
- Role: Rider

Maurizio Piovani (born 17 July 1959) is an Italian former professional racing cyclist. He rode in the 1987 Tour de France.
