= Martin Schalkers =

Dutch cyclist

Personal information
- Born: 5 April 1962 (age 64) Katwijk, Netherlands

Cycling career
- Sport: Cycling
- Discipline: Road
- Role: Rider

Professional teams
- 1987: Transvemij–Van Schilt
- 1988–1991: TVM–Van Schilt

Martin Schalkers (born 5 April 1962) is a Dutch former racing cyclist. He rode the 1990 Tour de France as well as four editions of the Giro d'Italia.

== Major results ==
1987
4th Grand Prix de Fourmies
7th Grote Prijs Jef Scherens
1988
5th Dwars door België
6th Grand Prix Impanis-Van Petegem
1989
1st Grand Prix de la Libération (TTT)
5th Kuurne–Brussels–Kuurne
1991
2nd Grand Prix de Denain
5th Veenendaal–Veenendaal
