= Juan Martínez Oliver =

Spanish cyclist

Personal information
- Full name: Juan Martínez Oliver
- Born: 4 February 1962 (age 64) Almeria, Spain

Cycling career
- Sport: Cycling
- Current team: Retired
- Discipline: Road
- Role: Rider

Major wins
- 1 stage 1988 Tour de France

Juan Martínez Oliver (born 4 February 1962 in Almeria) is a former Spanish professional road bicycle racer. He won a stage in the 1988 Tour de France. He also competed in the two events at the 1996 Summer Olympics.

== Major results ==
1987
Memorial Manuel Galera
1988
Fuengirola - Mijas
Tour de France:

Winner stage 21
