= Sergei Uslamin =

Russian cyclist

Personal information
- Born: 23 February 1963 (age 63)

Cycling career
- Sport: Cycling
- Role: Rider

Sergei Uslamin (born 23 February 1963) is a Russian racing cyclist. He rode in the 1990 Tour de France.
