= Nikolai Golovatenko =

Soviet cyclist

Personal information
- Born: 27 February 1963 (age 63) Kostanay, Soviet Union

Cycling career
- Sport: Cycling
- Role: Rider

Nikolai Golovatenko (born 27 February 1963) is a Soviet former racing cyclist. He rode in the 1990 Tour de France.
