= Chateau d'Ax (cycling team) =

Italian professional cycling team

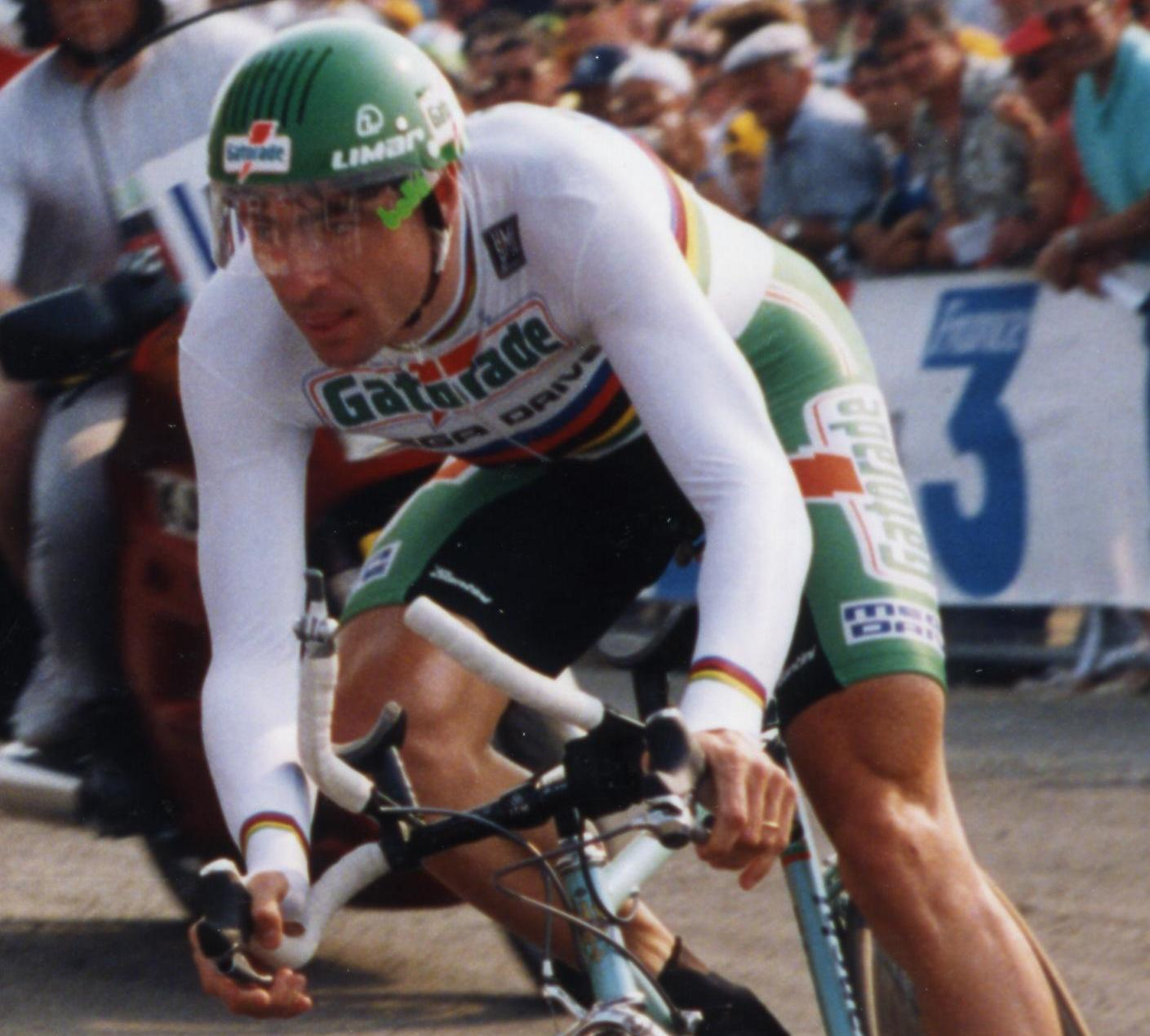
- Gianni Bugno at the 1993 Tour de France

Team information
- Registered: Italy
- Founded: 1983
- Disbanded: 1993
- Discipline: Road

Team name history
- 1983 1984–1985 1986 1987 1988–1990 1991–1992 1993 1993: Mareno–Wilier Triestina; Supermercati Brianzoli; Supermercati Brianzoli–Essebi; Supermercati Brianzoli–Chateau d'Ax; Chateau d'Ax–Salotti; Gatorade–Chateau d'Ax; Gatorade; Gatorade–Mega Drive–Kenwood

Chateau d'Ax was an Italian professional cycling team that existed from 1983 to 1993, when it was succeeded by Team Polti. Among its various sponsors was Chateau d'Ax, an Italian furniture manufacturer.
