= Seur (cycling team) =

Team information
- Registered: Spain
- Founded: 1988
- Disbanded: 1992
- Discipline: Road

Team name history
- 1988 1989–1990 1991 1992: Seur–Campagnolo–Bic; Seur; Seur–Otero; Seur

Seur was a Spanish professional cycling team that existed from 1988 to 1992. It was sponsored by Spanish transport company Seur. Marco Giovannetti won the general classification of the 1990 Vuelta a España with the team.
