= List of teams and cyclists in the 1985 Vuelta a España =

For the 1985 Vuelta a España, the field consisted of 170 riders; 101 finished the race.

== By rider ==
Legend
No.	Starting number worn by the rider during the Vuelta
Pos.	Position in the general classification
DNF	Denotes a rider who did not finish
DNS	Denotes a rider who did not start

No.	Name	Nationality	Team	Pos.	Ref
1	Éric Caritoux	FRA	Kas-Miko-Skil	6	
2	René Bittinger	FRA	Kas-Miko-Skil	DNF	
3	Patrice Esnault	FRA	Kas-Miko-Skil	DNF	
4	Guy Gallopin	FRA	Kas-Miko-Skil	DNF	
5	Dominique Garde	FRA	Kas-Miko-Skil	24	
6	Jean-Claude Garde	FRA	Kas-Miko-Skil	69	
7	Éric Guyot	FRA	Kas-Miko-Skil	34	
8	Sean Kelly	IRL	Kas-Miko-Skil	9	
9	Gilles Mas	FRA	Kas-Miko-Skil	25	
10	Philippe Poissonnier	FRA	Kas-Miko-Skil	66	
11	Mariano Bayón Magdaleno	ESP	Dormillon	DNF	
12	Francisco Caro	ESP	Dormillon	87	
13	Francisco Espinosa	ESP	Dormillon	56	
14	José Maria Moreno Ramírez	ESP	Dormillon	DNF	
15	José-Rafael Garcia	ESP	Dormillon	60	
16	Ludo Loos	BEL	Dormillon	DNF	
17	Juan Martínez Oliver	ESP	Dormillon	92	
18	Juan-Alberto Reig	ESP	Dormillon	89	
19	Camilo Santos	ESP	Dormillon	99	
20	Jesús Rodriguez Rodríguez	ESP	Dormillon	58	
21	Guido Beyens	BEL	Safir	88	
22	Luc Branckaerts	BEL	Safir	DNF	
23	Werner Devos	BEL	Safir	DNF	
24	Patrick Cocquyt	BEL	Safir	DNF	
25	Marc Dierickx	BEL	Safir	DNF	
26	Diederik Foubert	BEL	Safir	DNF	
27	Herman Frison	BEL	Safir	93	
28	Marc Van Geel	BEL	Safir	90	
29	Ronny Van Holen	BEL	Safir	74	
30	Patrick Verschueren	BEL	Safir	DNF	
31	Jean-Claude Bagot	FRA	Fagor	28	
32	Pierre Bazzo	FRA	Fagor	15	
33	Jean-René Bernaudeau	FRA	Fagor	DNF	
34	Jacques Bossis	FRA	Fagor	DNF	
35	Alfons De Wolf	BEL	Fagor	81	
36	François Lemarchand	FRA	Fagor	51	
37	Pedro Muñoz Machín Rodríguez	ESP	Fagor	DNF	
38	René Martens	BEL	Fagor	73	
39	Thierry Peloso	FRA	Fagor	DNF	
40	Pol Verschuere	BEL	Fagor	DNF	
41	Sabino Angoitia	ESP	Hueso	86	
42	Ángel de las Heras	ESP	Hueso	22	
43	Guillermo de la Peña	ESP	Hueso	DNF	
44	Juan-Marîa Eguiarte	ESP	Hueso	79	
45	Isidro Juárez	ESP	Hueso	63	
46	Carlos Machín	ESP	Hueso	70	
47	Juan Tomás Martínez	ESP	Hueso	16	
48	Jaime Salva	ESP	Hueso	DNF	
49	Jesús Suárez Cueva	ESP	Hueso	78	
50	Jon Urien	ESP	Hueso	65	
51	Bernardo Alfonsel	ESP	Kelme	40	
52	Vicente Belda	ESP	Kelme	18	
53	Francisco Cambil	ESP	Kelme	96	
54	Javier Castellar	ESP	Kelme	85	
55	Antonio Esparza	ESP	Kelme	DNF	
56	Arsenio González	ESP	Kelme	35	
57	Miguel Ángel Iglesias	ESP	Kelme	55	
58	Francisco López Gonzalvo	ESP	Kelme	100	
59	José Recio	ESP	Kelme	DNF	
60	Mariano Sánchez Martínez	ESP	Kelme	41	
61	Benjamin Carvalho	POR	Lousa-Trinaranus	91	
62	Abel Cuelho	POR	Lousa-Trinaranus	DNF	
63	Manuel Cunha	POR	Lousa-Trinaranus	30	
64	Luís Domingos	POR	Lousa-Trinaranus	80	
65	Carlos Ferreira	POR	Lousa-Trinaranus	DNF	
66	Carlos Marta	POR	Lousa-Trinaranus	DNF	
67	Jacinto Paulinho	POR	Lousa-Trinaranus	57	
68	João Battista Silva Paulo	POR	Lousa-Trinaranus	DNF	
69	José Poeira	POR	Lousa-Trinaranus	=47	
70	Adelino Teixeira	POR	Lousa-Trinaranus	DNF	
71	Pedro Delgado	ESP	MG-Orbea	1	
72	Manuel Jorge Domínguez	ESP	MG-Orbea	DNF	
73	Anastasio Greciano	ESP	MG-Orbea	=47	
74	Mathieu Hermans	NED	MG-Orbea	67	
75	Jerónimo Ibáñez Escribano	ESP	MG-Orbea	DNF	
76	Jokin Mújika	ESP	MG-Orbea	43	
77	Pello Ruiz Cabestany	ESP	MG-Orbea	4	
78	Jaime Vilamajó	ESP	MG-Orbea	DNF	
79	Felipe Yáñez	ESP	MG-Orbea	DNF	
80	Ricardo Zúñiga Carrasco	ESP	MG-Orbea	82	
81	Jos Alberts	NED	Panasonic-Raleigh	DNF	
82	Theo de Rooij	NED	Panasonic-Raleigh	38	
83	Alexi Grewal	USA	Panasonic-Raleigh	DNF	
84	Eddy Planckaert	BEL	Panasonic-Raleigh	DNF	
85	Walter Planckaert	BEL	Panasonic-Raleigh	DNF	
86	Bert Oosterbosch	NED	Panasonic-Raleigh	DNF	
87	Steven Rooks	NED	Panasonic-Raleigh	DNF	
88	Gerard Veldscholten	NED	Panasonic-Raleigh	13	
89	Bert Wekema	NED	Panasonic-Raleigh	DNF	
90	Peter Winnen	NED	Panasonic-Raleigh	DNF	
91	Régis Clère	FRA	Peugeot-Shell	DNF	
92	Francis Castaing	FRA	Peugeot-Shell	101	
93	Gilbert Duclos-Lassalle	FRA	Peugeot-Shell	49	
94	Ronan Pensec	FRA	Peugeot-Shell	44	
95	Frederic Brun	FRA	Peugeot-Shell	98	
96	Dominique Lecrocq	FRA	Peugeot-Shell	DNF	
97	Éric Louvel	FRA	Peugeot-Shell	97	
98	Robert Millar	GBR	Peugeot-Shell	2	
99	Pascal Simon	FRA	Peugeot-Shell	14	
100	Sean Yates	GBR	Peugeot-Shell	DNF	
101	José Antonio Agudelo Gómez	COL	Varta-Café de Colombia	DNF	
102	Rogelio Arango	COL	Varta-Café de Colombia	DNF	
103	Samuel Cabrera	COL	Varta-Café de Colombia	DNF	
104	Edgar Corredor	COL	Varta-Café de Colombia	DNF	
105	Alfonso Flórez Ortiz	COL	Varta-Café de Colombia	DNF	
106	Luis Herrera	COL	Varta-Café de Colombia	DNF	
107	Carlos Jaramillo	COL	Varta-Café de Colombia	46	
108	Fabio Parra	COL	Varta-Café de Colombia	5	
109	Martín Ramírez	COL	Varta-Café de Colombia	23	
110	Pablo Wilches	COL	Varta-Café de Colombia	39	
111	Enrique Aja	ESP	Reynolds	DNF	
112	Guillermo Arenas	ESP	Reynolds	61	
113	Eduardo Chozas	ESP	Reynolds	29	
114	Iñaki Gastón	ESP	Reynolds	21	
115	Julián Gorospe	ESP	Reynolds	11	
116	Carlos Hernández	ESP	Reynolds	36	
117	Jesús Hernández Úbeda	ESP	Reynolds	45	
118	Miguel Induráin	ESP	Reynolds	84	
119	José Luis Laguía	ESP	Reynolds	27	
120	Celestino Prieto	ESP	Reynolds	12	
121	Gaetano Baronchelli	ITA	Supermercati Brianzoli	DNF	
122	Gianbattista Baronchelli	ITA	Supermercati Brianzoli	DNF	
123	Antonio Bevilacqua	ITA	Supermercati Brianzoli	DNF	
124	Giovanni Bottoia	ITA	Supermercati Brianzoli	DNS (DNS-P)	
125	Maurizio Colombo	ITA	Supermercati Brianzoli	DNF	
126	Alfredo Chinetti	ITA	Supermercati Brianzoli	DNF	
127	Claudio Corti	ITA	Supermercati Brianzoli	54	
128	Antonio Ferretti	ITA	Supermercati Brianzoli	83	
129	Giovanni Mantovani	ITA	Supermercati Brianzoli	DNF	
130	Gianni Zola	ITA	Supermercati Brianzoli	75	
131	Jesús Blanco Villar	ESP	Teka	DNF	
132	Antonio Coll	ESP	Teka	17	
133	Faustino Cuelli	ESP	Teka	31	
134	Noël Dejonckheere	BEL	Teka	94	
135	Pedro Díaz Zabala	ESP	Teka	DNF	
136	Reimund Dietzen	FRG	Teka	7	
137	Federico Echave	ESP	Teka	33	
138	José-María González Barcala	ESP	Teka	59	
139	Ángel Sarrapio	ESP	Teka	62	
140	Modesto Urrutibeazkoa	ESP	Teka	68	
141	Sergey Ermachenko	URS	USSR Selection (amateur)	53	
142	Ivan Ivanov	URS	USSR Selection (amateur)	20	
143	Nikolay Kosyakov	URS	USSR Selection (amateur)	76	
144	Vladimir Malakhov	URS	USSR Selection (amateur)	71	
145	Yuri Barinov	URS	USSR Selection (amateur)	72	
146	Aleksandr Osipov	URS	USSR Selection (amateur)	52	
147	Yurij Perunovsky	URS	USSR Selection (amateur)	77	
148	Andrey Toporichev	URS	USSR Selection (amateur)	37	
149	Andrey Vedernikov	URS	USSR Selection (amateur)	DNF	
150	Vladimir Voloshin	URS	USSR Selection (amateur)	32	
151	Michael Carter	USA	Xerox-Philadelphia Lasers	DNF	
152	David Cech	USA	Xerox-Philadelphia Lasers	DNF	
153	John Eustice	USA	Xerox-Philadelphia Lasers	DNF	
154	Greg Gilmore	USA	Xerox-Philadelphia Lasers	DNF	
155	André Chappuis	FRA	Xerox-Philadelphia Lasers	DNF	
156	Claude Michely	LUX	Xerox-Philadelphia Lasers	DNF	
157	Anthony Mortimore	NZL	Xerox-Philadelphia Lasers	DNF	
158	Peter Moody	USA	Xerox-Philadelphia Lasers	DNF	
159	Greg Saunders	USA	Xerox-Philadelphia Lasers	DNF	
160	Rudi Weber	FRG	Xerox-Philadelphia Lasers	DNF	
161	Jesus I. Alonso	ESP	Zor-Gemeaz	64	
162	Ángel Camarillo	ESP	Zor-Gemeaz	50	
163	Marc Durant	FRA	Zor-Gemeaz	42	
164	Juan Fernandez	ESP	Zor-Gemeaz	DNF	
165	José Luis Navarro	ESP	Zor-Gemeaz	10	
166	Álvaro Pino	ESP	Zor-Gemeaz	8	
167	Faustino Rupérez	ESP	Zor-Gemeaz	19	
168	Francisco Rodríguez	COL	Zor-Gemeaz	3	
169	Jesús Rodríguez Magro	ESP	Zor-Gemeaz	26	
170	Manuel Zeferino	POR	Zor-Gemeaz	95	
