= 1985 Vuelta a España, Stage 10 to Stage 19 =

Cycling race stages

The 1985 Vuelta a España was the 40th edition of the Vuelta a España, one of cycling's Grand Tours. The Vuelta began in Valladolid, with a prologue individual time trial on 23 April, and Stage 10 occurred on 3 May with a stage from Sabiñánigo. The race finished in Salamanca on 12 May.

== Stage 10 ==
3 May 1985 — Sabiñánigo to Tremp, 209 km (130 mi)

Stage 10 result

Rank	Rider	Team	Time
1	Sean Kelly (IRL)	Skil–Sem–Kas–Miko	5h 31' 31"
2	Gianbattista Baronchelli (ITA)	Supermercati Brianzoli	s.t.
3	Álvaro Pino (ESP)	Zor–Gemeaz Cusin	s.t.
4	Francisco Rodríguez (COL)	Zor–Gemeaz Cusin	s.t.
5	Ivan Ivanov (URS)	USSR Selection (amateur)	s.t.
6	Robert Millar (GBR)	Peugeot–Shell–Michelin	s.t.
7	Fabio Parra (COL)	Varta–Café de Colombia–Mavic	s.t.
8	Martín Ramírez (COL)	Varta–Café de Colombia–Mavic	s.t.
9	Pello Ruiz Cabestany (ESP)	Orbea–Gin MG	+ 30"
10	José Luis Navarro (ESP)	Zor–Gemeaz Cusin	s.t.

General classification after Stage 10

Rank	Rider	Team	Time
1	Robert Millar (GBR)	Peugeot–Shell–Michelin	57h 22' 49"
2	Pello Ruiz Cabestany (ESP)	Orbea–Gin MG	+ 24"
3	Francisco Rodríguez (COL)	Zor–Gemeaz Cusin	+ 37"
4	Fabio Parra (COL)	Varta–Café de Colombia–Mavic	+ 1' 52"
5	Reimund Dietzen (FRG)	Teka	+ 3' 20"
6	Pedro Delgado (ESP)	Orbea–Gin MG	+ 3' 48"
7	José Luis Navarro (ESP)	Zor–Gemeaz Cusin	+ 3' 53"
8	Julián Gorospe (ESP)	Reynolds	+ 4' 15"
9	Éric Caritoux (FRA)	Skil–Sem–Kas–Miko	+ 4' 59"
10	Pascal Simon (FRA)	Peugeot–Shell–Michelin	+ 5' 08"

== Stage 11 ==
4 May 1985 — Tremp to Andorra, 124 km (77 mi)

Stage 11 result

Rank	Rider	Team	Time
1	Francisco Rodríguez (COL)	Zor–Gemeaz Cusin	3h 29' 06"
2	Éric Caritoux (FRA)	Skil–Sem–Kas–Miko	s.t.
3	Pello Ruiz Cabestany (ESP)	Orbea–Gin MG	s.t.
4	Pedro Delgado (ESP)	Orbea–Gin MG	s.t.
5	Fabio Parra (COL)	Varta–Café de Colombia–Mavic	s.t.
6	Álvaro Pino (ESP)	Zor–Gemeaz Cusin	s.t.
7	Robert Millar (GBR)	Peugeot–Shell–Michelin	+ 14"
8	Julián Gorospe (ESP)	Reynolds	s.t.
9	Ángel de las Heras (ESP)	Hueso	s.t.
10	Reimund Dietzen (FRG)	Teka	s.t.

General classification after Stage 11

Rank	Rider	Team	Time
1	Robert Millar (GBR)	Peugeot–Shell–Michelin	60h 52' 09"
2	Pello Ruiz Cabestany (ESP)	Orbea–Gin MG	+ 10"
3	Francisco Rodríguez (COL)	Zor–Gemeaz Cusin	+ 23"
4	Fabio Parra (COL)	Varta–Café de Colombia–Mavic	+ 1' 38"
5	Reimund Dietzen (FRG)	Teka	+ 3' 20"
6	Pedro Delgado (ESP)	Orbea–Gin MG	+ 3' 34"
7	Julián Gorospe (ESP)	Reynolds	+ 4' 15"
8	Éric Caritoux (FRA)	Skil–Sem–Kas–Miko	+ 4' 45"
9	José Luis Navarro (ESP)	Zor–Gemeaz Cusin	+ 4' 46"
10	Faustino Rupérez (ESP)	Zor–Gemeaz Cusin	+ 5' 33"

== Stage 12 ==
5 May 1985 — Andorra to Pal, 16 km (9.9 mi) (ITT)

Stage 12 result

Rank	Rider	Team	Time
1	Francisco Rodríguez (COL)	Zor–Gemeaz Cusin	34' 51"
2	Robert Millar (GBR)	Peugeot–Shell–Michelin	+ 10"
3	Luis Herrera (COL)	Varta–Café de Colombia–Mavic	+ 14"
4	Julián Gorospe (ESP)	Reynolds	+ 36"
5	Antonio Coll (ESP)	Teka	+ 49"
6	Antonio Agudelo (COL)	Varta–Café de Colombia–Mavic	+ 57"
7	Pablo Wilches (COL)	Varta–Café de Colombia–Mavic	s.t.
8	Pedro Delgado (ESP)	Orbea–Gin MG	+ 1' 17"
9	Fabio Parra (COL)	Varta–Café de Colombia–Mavic	+ 1' 26"
10	Sean Kelly (IRL)	Skil–Sem–Kas–Miko	+ 1' 47"

General classification after Stage 12

Rank	Rider	Team	Time
1	Robert Millar (GBR)	Peugeot–Shell–Michelin	61h 27' 10"
2	Francisco Rodríguez (COL)	Zor–Gemeaz Cusin	+ 13"
3	Pello Ruiz Cabestany (ESP)	Orbea–Gin MG	+ 1' 59"
4	Fabio Parra (COL)	Varta–Café de Colombia–Mavic	+ 2' 54"
5	Pedro Delgado (ESP)	Orbea–Gin MG	+ 4' 41"
6	Julián Gorospe (ESP)	Reynolds	s.t.
7	Reimund Dietzen (FRG)	Teka	+ 5' 21"
8	Éric Caritoux (FRA)	Skil–Sem–Kas–Miko	+ 6' 22"
9	Faustino Rupérez (ESP)	Zor–Gemeaz Cusin	+ 8' 05"
10	José Luis Navarro (ESP)	Zor–Gemeaz Cusin	+ 8' 19"

== Stage 13 ==
6 May 1985 — Andorra to Sant Quirze del Vallès, 193 km (120 mi)

Stage 13 result

Rank	Rider	Team	Time
1	Ángel Sarrapio (ESP)	Teka	4h 47' 37"
2	Antonio Coll (ESP)	Teka	+ 3' 14"
3	Pello Ruiz Cabestany (ESP)	Orbea–Gin MG	s.t.
4	Sean Kelly (IRL)	Skil–Sem–Kas–Miko	s.t.
5	Reimund Dietzen (FRG)	Teka	s.t.
6	José Recio (ESP)	Kelme–Merckx	s.t.
7	Pedro Delgado (ESP)	Orbea–Gin MG	+ 3' 15"
8	Federico Echave (ESP)	Teka	+ 3' 18"
9	Gerard Veldscholten (NED)	Panasonic–Raleigh	s.t.
10	Jean Zola (ITA)	Supermercati Brianzoli	s.t.

General classification after Stage 13

Rank	Rider	Team	Time
1	Robert Millar (GBR)	Peugeot–Shell–Michelin	66h 18' 05"
2	Francisco Rodríguez (COL)	Zor–Gemeaz Cusin	+ 13"
3	Pello Ruiz Cabestany (ESP)	Orbea–Gin MG	+ 1' 55"
4	Fabio Parra (COL)	Varta–Café de Colombia–Mavic	+ 2' 54"
5	Pedro Delgado (ESP)	Orbea–Gin MG	+ 4' 38"
6	Julián Gorospe (ESP)	Reynolds	+ 4' 41"
7	Reimund Dietzen (FRG)	Teka	+ 5' 17"
8	Éric Caritoux (FRA)	Skil–Sem–Kas–Miko	+ 6' 22"
9	Faustino Rupérez (ESP)	Zor–Gemeaz Cusin	+ 8' 05"
10	Álvaro Pino (ESP)	Zor–Gemeaz Cusin	+ 8' 24"

== Stage 14 ==
7 May 1985 — Valencia to Benidorm, 201 km (125 mi)

Stage 14 result

Rank	Rider	Team	Time
1	José Recio (ESP)	Kelme–Merckx	5h 12' 19"
2	Dominique Garde (FRA)	Skil–Sem–Kas–Miko	+ 3' 48"
3	Federico Echave (ESP)	Teka	+ 3' 57"
4	Bernardo Alfonsel (ESP)	Kelme–Merckx	s.t.
5	Eduardo Chozas (ESP)	Reynolds	s.t.
6	Sean Kelly (IRL)	Skil–Sem–Kas–Miko	+ 5' 41"
7	Pello Ruiz Cabestany (ESP)	Orbea–Gin MG	s.t.
8	Alexander Osipov (URS)	USSR Selection (amateur)	s.t.
9	Serguei Ermatchenko (URS)	USSR Selection (amateur)	s.t.
10	Pierre Bazzo (FRA)	Fagor	s.t.

General classification after Stage 14

Rank	Rider	Team	Time
1	Robert Millar (GBR)	Peugeot–Shell–Michelin	71h 36' 05"
2	Francisco Rodríguez (COL)	Zor–Gemeaz Cusin	+ 13"
3	Pello Ruiz Cabestany (ESP)	Orbea–Gin MG	+ 1' 55"
4	Fabio Parra (COL)	Varta–Café de Colombia–Mavic	+ 2' 54"
5	Pedro Delgado (ESP)	Orbea–Gin MG	+ 4' 38"
6	Julián Gorospe (ESP)	Reynolds	+ 4' 41"
7	Reimund Dietzen (FRG)	Teka	+ 5' 17"
8	Éric Caritoux (FRA)	Skil–Sem–Kas–Miko	+ 6' 22"
9	Álvaro Pino (ESP)	Zor–Gemeaz Cusin	+ 8' 24"
10	José Luis Navarro (ESP)	Zor–Gemeaz Cusin	+ 8' 29"

== Stage 15 ==
8 May 1985 — Benidorm to Albacete, 208 km (129 mi)

Stage 15 result

Rank	Rider	Team	Time
1	Sean Kelly (IRL)	Skil–Sem–Kas–Miko	6h 21' 33"
2	Francis Castaing (FRA)	Peugeot–Shell–Michelin	s.t.
3	Noël Dejonckheere (BEL)	Teka	s.t.
4	Ronny Van Holen (BEL)	Safir–Van de Ven	s.t.
5	Mathieu Hermans (NED)	Orbea–Gin MG	s.t.
6	Iñaki Gastón (ESP)	Reynolds	s.t.
7	Jesús Suárez Cueva (ESP)	Hueso	s.t.
8	Juan Tomás Martínez (ESP)	Hueso	s.t.
9	Sabino Angoitia (ESP)	Hueso	s.t.
10	Vladimir Malakhov (URS)	USSR Selection (amateur)	s.t.

General classification after Stage 15

Rank	Rider	Team	Time
1	Robert Millar (GBR)	Peugeot–Shell–Michelin	77h 57' 38"
2	Francisco Rodríguez (COL)	Zor–Gemeaz Cusin	+ 13"
3	Pello Ruiz Cabestany (ESP)	Orbea–Gin MG	+ 1' 55"
4	Fabio Parra (COL)	Varta–Café de Colombia–Mavic	+ 2' 54"
5	Pedro Delgado (ESP)	Orbea–Gin MG	+ 4' 38"
6	Julián Gorospe (ESP)	Reynolds	+ 4' 41"
7	Reimund Dietzen (FRG)	Teka	+ 5' 17"
8	Éric Caritoux (FRA)	Skil–Sem–Kas–Miko	+ 6' 22"
9	Álvaro Pino (ESP)	Zor–Gemeaz Cusin	+ 8' 24"
10	José Luis Navarro (ESP)	Zor–Gemeaz Cusin	+ 8' 29"

== Stage 16 ==
9 May 1985 — Albacete to Alcalá de Henares, 252 km (157 mi)

Stage 16 result

Rank	Rider	Team	Time
1	Isidro Juárez (ESP)	Hueso	7h 10' 49"
2	Vladimir Malakhov (URS)	USSR Selection (amateur)	+ 43"
3	Noël Dejonckheere (BEL)	Teka	s.t.
4	Sean Kelly (IRL)	Skil–Sem–Kas–Miko	s.t.
5	Ronny Van Holen (BEL)	Safir–Van de Ven	s.t.
6	Javier Castellar (ESP)	Kelme–Merckx	s.t.
7	Jesús Suárez Cueva (ESP)	Hueso	s.t.
8	Guy Gallopin (FRA)	Skil–Sem–Kas–Miko	s.t.
9	Sabino Angoitia (ESP)	Hueso	s.t.
10	Patrick Verschueren (BEL)	Safir–Van de Ven	s.t.

General classification after Stage 16

Rank	Rider	Team	Time
1	Robert Millar (GBR)	Peugeot–Shell–Michelin	85h 09' 10"
2	Francisco Rodríguez (COL)	Zor–Gemeaz Cusin	+ 13"
3	Pello Ruiz Cabestany (ESP)	Orbea–Gin MG	+ 1' 55"
4	Fabio Parra (COL)	Varta–Café de Colombia–Mavic	+ 2' 54"
5	Pedro Delgado (ESP)	Orbea–Gin MG	+ 4' 38"
6	Julián Gorospe (ESP)	Reynolds	+ 4' 41"
7	Reimund Dietzen (FRG)	Teka	+ 5' 17"
8	Éric Caritoux (FRA)	Skil–Sem–Kas–Miko	+ 6' 22"
9	Álvaro Pino (ESP)	Zor–Gemeaz Cusin	+ 8' 24"
10	José Luis Navarro (ESP)	Zor–Gemeaz Cusin	+ 8' 29"

== Stage 17 ==
10 May 1985 — Alcalá de Henares to Alcalá de Henares, 43 km (27 mi) (ITT)

Stage 17 result

Rank	Rider	Team	Time
1	Pello Ruiz Cabestany (ESP)	Orbea–Gin MG	59' 32"
2	Francisco Rodríguez (COL)	Zor–Gemeaz Cusin	+ 37"
3	Robert Millar (GBR)	Peugeot–Shell–Michelin	+ 40"
4	Reimund Dietzen (FRG)	Teka	+ 43"
5	Gilbert Duclos-Lassalle (FRA)	Peugeot–Shell–Michelin	+ 1' 06"
6	Iñaki Gastón (ESP)	Reynolds	+ 1' 09"
7	Julián Gorospe (ESP)	Reynolds	+ 1' 12"
8	Gerard Veldscholten (NED)	Panasonic–Raleigh	+ 1' 31"
9	Sean Kelly (IRL)	Skil–Sem–Kas–Miko	s.t.
10	Pascal Simon (FRA)	Peugeot–Shell–Michelin	+ 1' 44"

General classification after Stage 17

Rank	Rider	Team	Time
1	Robert Millar (GBR)	Peugeot–Shell–Michelin	86h 09' 22"
2	Francisco Rodríguez (COL)	Zor–Gemeaz Cusin	+ 10"
3	Pello Ruiz Cabestany (ESP)	Orbea–Gin MG	+ 1' 15"
4	Julián Gorospe (ESP)	Reynolds	+ 5' 13"
5	Reimund Dietzen (FRG)	Teka	+ 5' 20"
6	Pedro Delgado (ESP)	Orbea–Gin MG	+ 6' 13"
7	Fabio Parra (COL)	Varta–Café de Colombia–Mavic	+ 6' 25"
8	Éric Caritoux (FRA)	Skil–Sem–Kas–Miko	+ 8' 53"
9	Álvaro Pino (ESP)	Zor–Gemeaz Cusin	+ 10' 26"
10	Sean Kelly (IRL)	Skil–Sem–Kas–Miko	+ 10' 37"

== Stage 18 ==
11 May 1985 — Alcalá de Henares to Palazuelos de Eresma (Destilerías DYC), 200 km (120 mi)

Stage 18 result

Rank	Rider	Team	Time
1	José Recio (ESP)	Kelme–Merckx	5h 27' 13"
2	Pedro Delgado (ESP)	Orbea–Gin MG	+ 1"
3	Sean Kelly (IRL)	Skil–Sem–Kas–Miko	+ 3' 29"
4	Celestino Prieto (ESP)	Reynolds	s.t.
5	José Luis Navarro (ESP)	Zor–Gemeaz Cusin	s.t.
6	Ángel de las Heras (ESP)	Hueso	s.t.
7	Álvaro Pino (ESP)	Zor–Gemeaz Cusin	s.t.
8	Pierre Bazzo (FRA)	Fagor	s.t.
9	Éric Caritoux (FRA)	Skil–Sem–Kas–Miko	s.t.
10	Fabio Parra (COL)	Varta–Café de Colombia–Mavic	s.t.

General classification after Stage 18

Rank	Rider	Team	Time
1	Pedro Delgado (ESP)	Orbea–Gin MG	91h 42' 49"
2	Robert Millar (GBR)	Peugeot–Shell–Michelin	+ 36"
3	Francisco Rodríguez (COL)	Zor–Gemeaz Cusin	+ 46"
4	Pello Ruiz Cabestany (ESP)	Orbea–Gin MG	+ 1' 51"
5	Fabio Parra (COL)	Varta–Café de Colombia–Mavic	+ 3' 40"
6	Éric Caritoux (FRA)	Skil–Sem–Kas–Miko	+ 6' 08"
7	Reimund Dietzen (FRG)	Teka	+ 6' 36"
8	Álvaro Pino (ESP)	Zor–Gemeaz Cusin	+ 7' 41"
9	Sean Kelly (IRL)	Skil–Sem–Kas–Miko	+ 7' 52"
10	José Luis Navarro (ESP)	Zor–Gemeaz Cusin	+ 8' 56"

== Stage 19 ==
12 May 1985 — Palazuelos de Eresma (Destilerías DYC) to Salamanca, 175 km (109 mi)

Stage 19 result

Rank	Rider	Team	Time
1	Vladimir Malakhov (URS)	USSR Selection (amateur)	4h 15' 11"
2	Noël Dejonckheere (BEL)	Teka	s.t.
3	Sean Kelly (IRL)	Skil–Sem–Kas–Miko	s.t.
4	Jesús Suárez Cueva (ESP)	Hueso	s.t.
5	Francis Castaing (FRA)	Peugeot–Shell–Michelin	s.t.
6	Mathieu Hermans (NED)	Orbea–Gin MG	s.t.
7	Miguel Ángel Iglesias (ESP)	Kelme–Merckx	s.t.
8	José Luis Navarro (ESP)	Zor–Gemeaz Cusin	s.t.
9	Dominique Garde (FRA)	Skil–Sem–Kas–Miko	s.t.
10	Ronny Van Holen (BEL)	Safir–Van de Ven	s.t.

General classification after Stage 19

Rank	Rider	Team	Time
1	Pedro Delgado (ESP)	Orbea–Gin MG	95h 58' 00"
2	Robert Millar (GBR)	Peugeot–Shell–Michelin	+ 36"
3	Francisco Rodríguez (COL)	Zor–Gemeaz Cusin	+ 46"
4	Pello Ruiz Cabestany (ESP)	Orbea–Gin MG	+ 1' 51"
5	Fabio Parra (COL)	Varta–Café de Colombia–Mavic	+ 3' 40"
6	Éric Caritoux (FRA)	Skil–Sem–Kas–Miko	+ 6' 08"
7	Reimund Dietzen (FRG)	Teka	+ 6' 36"
8	Álvaro Pino (ESP)	Zor–Gemeaz Cusin	+ 7' 41"
9	Sean Kelly (IRL)	Skil–Sem–Kas–Miko	+ 7' 52"
10	José Luis Navarro (ESP)	Zor–Gemeaz Cusin	+ 8' 56"
