= 1985 Vuelta a España, Prologue to Stage 9 =

Cycling race stages

The 1985 Vuelta a España was the 40th edition of the Vuelta a España, one of cycling's Grand Tours. The Vuelta began in Valladolid, with a prologue individual time trial on 23 April, and Stage 9 occurred on 2 May with a stage to Balneario de Panticosa. The race finished in Salamanca on 12 May.

== Prologue ==
23 April 1985 — Valladolid to Valladolid, 5.6 km (3.5 mi) (ITT)

Prologue result

Rank	Rider	Team	Time
1	Bert Oosterbosch (NED)	Panasonic–Raleigh	6' 25"
2	Miguel Induráin (ESP)	Reynolds	+ 8"
3	Gilbert Duclos-Lassalle (FRA)	Peugeot–Shell–Michelin	+ 10"
4	Sean Yates (GBR)	Peugeot–Shell–Michelin	s.t.
5	Julián Gorospe (ESP)	Reynolds	+ 11"
6	Sean Kelly (IRL)	Skil–Sem–Kas–Miko	+ 13"
7	Pello Ruiz Cabestany (ESP)	Orbea–Gin MG	+ 14"
8	Jesús Blanco Villar (ESP)	Teka	s.t.
9	Eduardo Chozas (ESP)	Reynolds	+ 15"
10	Gianbattista Baronchelli (ITA)	Supermercati Brianzoli	+ 16"

== Stage 1 ==
24 April 1985 — Valladolid to Zamora, 177 km (110 mi)

Stage 1 result

Rank	Rider	Team	Time
1	Eddy Planckaert (BEL)	Panasonic–Raleigh	4h 29' 20"
2	Francis Castaing (FRA)	Peugeot–Shell–Michelin	s.t.
3	Werner Devos (BEL)	Safir–Van de Ven	s.t.
4	Jesús Suárez Cueva (ESP)	Hueso	s.t.
5	Dominique Lecrocq (FRA)	Peugeot–Shell–Michelin	s.t.
6	Patrick Verschueren (BEL)	Safir–Van de Ven	s.t.
7	Sean Kelly (IRL)	Skil–Sem–Kas–Miko	s.t.
8	Giovanni Mantovani (ITA)	Supermercati Brianzoli	s.t.
9	José Luis Navarro (ESP)	Zor–Gemeaz Cusin	s.t.
10	Ronny Van Holen (BEL)	Safir–Van de Ven	s.t.

General classification after Stage 1

Rank	Rider	Team	Time
1	Bert Oosterbosch (NED)	Panasonic–Raleigh	4h 35' 35"
2	Miguel Induráin (ESP)	Reynolds	+ 8"
3	Gilbert Duclos-Lassalle (FRA)	Peugeot–Shell–Michelin	+ 10"
4	Sean Yates (GBR)	Peugeot–Shell–Michelin	s.t.
5	Julián Gorospe (ESP)	Reynolds	+ 11"
6	Sean Kelly (IRL)	Skil–Sem–Kas–Miko	+ 13"
7	Pello Ruiz Cabestany (ESP)	Orbea–Gin MG	+ 14"
8	Jesús Blanco Villar (ESP)	Teka	s.t.
9	Eduardo Chozas (ESP)	Reynolds	+ 15"
10	José Recio (ESP)	Kelme–Merckx	+ 17"

== Stage 2 ==
25 April 1985 — Zamora to Orense, 262 km (163 mi)

Stage 2 result

Rank	Rider	Team	Time
1	Sean Kelly (IRL)	Skil–Sem–Kas–Miko	6h 26' 03"
2	José Luis Laguía (ESP)	Reynolds	s.t.
3	Juan Fernandez (ESP)	Zor–Gemeaz Cusin	s.t.
4	José Luis Navarro (ESP)	Zor–Gemeaz Cusin	s.t.
5	Steven Rooks (NED)	Panasonic–Raleigh	s.t.
6	José Recio (ESP)	Kelme–Merckx	s.t.
7	Mathieu Hermans (NED)	Orbea–Gin MG	s.t.
8	Pello Ruiz Cabestany (ESP)	Orbea–Gin MG	s.t.
9	Gianbattista Baronchelli (ITA)	Supermercati Brianzoli	s.t.
10	Peter Winnen (NED)	Panasonic–Raleigh	s.t.

General classification after Stage 2

Rank	Rider	Team	Time
1	Miguel Induráin (ESP)	Reynolds	11h 01' 56"
2	Julián Gorospe (ESP)	Reynolds	+ 3"
3	Sean Kelly (IRL)	Skil–Sem–Kas–Miko	+ 5"
4	Pello Ruiz Cabestany (ESP)	Orbea–Gin MG	s.t.
5	Jesús Blanco Villar (ESP)	Teka	s.t.
6	Eduardo Chozas (ESP)	Reynolds	+ 7"
7	José Recio (ESP)	Kelme–Merckx	+ 9"
8	Pascal Simon (FRA)	Peugeot–Shell–Michelin	+ 10"
9	Francisco Rodríguez (COL)	Zor–Gemeaz Cusin	+ 11"
10	Antonio Coll (ESP)	Teka	s.t.

== Stage 3 ==
26 April 1985 — Ourense to Santiago de Compostela, 197 km (122 mi)

Stage 3 result

Rank	Rider	Team	Time
1	Gianbattista Baronchelli (ITA)	Supermercati Brianzoli	5h 11' 25"
2	Giovanni Mantovani (ITA)	Supermercati Brianzoli	+ 4"
3	Mathieu Hermans (NED)	Orbea–Gin MG	s.t.
4	José Luis Navarro (ESP)	Zor–Gemeaz Cusin	s.t.
5	Jesús Blanco Villar (ESP)	Teka	s.t.
6	Jesús Suárez Cueva (ESP)	Hueso	s.t.
7	Pedro Delgado (ESP)	Orbea–Gin MG	s.t.
8	Francis Castaing (FRA)	Peugeot–Shell–Michelin	s.t.
9	Sean Kelly (IRL)	Skil–Sem–Kas–Miko	s.t.
10	Juan Fernandez (ESP)	Zor–Gemeaz Cusin	s.t.

General classification after Stage 3

Rank	Rider	Team	Time
1	Miguel Induráin (ESP)	Reynolds	16h 13' 25"
2	Sean Kelly (IRL)	Skil–Sem–Kas–Miko	+ 5"
3	Pello Ruiz Cabestany (ESP)	Orbea–Gin MG	+ 6"
4	Jesús Blanco Villar (ESP)	Teka	s.t.
5	José Recio (ESP)	Kelme–Merckx	+ 9"
6	Steven Rooks (NED)	Panasonic–Raleigh	+ 12"
7	Peter Winnen (NED)	Panasonic–Raleigh	+ 14"
8	Gerard Veldscholten (NED)	Panasonic–Raleigh	s.t.
9	Pedro Muñoz (ESP)	Fagor	s.t.
10	Éric Caritoux (FRA)	Skil–Sem–Kas–Miko	+ 15"

== Stage 4 ==
27 April 1985 — Santiago de Compostela to Lugo, 162 km (101 mi)

Stage 4 result

Rank	Rider	Team	Time
1	Eddy Planckaert (BEL)	Panasonic–Raleigh	4h 19' 40"
2	Francis Castaing (FRA)	Peugeot–Shell–Michelin	s.t.
3	Sean Kelly (IRL)	Skil–Sem–Kas–Miko	s.t.
4	Miguel Ángel Iglesias (ESP)	Kelme–Merckx	s.t.
5	José Luis Navarro (ESP)	Zor–Gemeaz Cusin	s.t.
6	Jesús Blanco Villar (ESP)	Teka	s.t.
7	Giovanni Mantovani (ITA)	Supermercati Brianzoli	s.t.
8	Alfons De Wolf (BEL)	Fagor	s.t.
9	Jean-René Bernaudeau (FRA)	Fagor	s.t.
10	Dominique Garde (FRA)	Skil–Sem–Kas–Miko	s.t.

General classification after Stage 4

Rank	Rider	Team	Time
1	Miguel Induráin (ESP)	Reynolds	20h 33' 05"
2	Sean Kelly (IRL)	Skil–Sem–Kas–Miko	+ 5"
3	Pello Ruiz Cabestany (ESP)	Orbea–Gin MG	+ 6"
4	Jesús Blanco Villar (ESP)	Teka	s.t.
5	José Recio (ESP)	Kelme–Merckx	+ 9"
6	Steven Rooks (NED)	Panasonic–Raleigh	+ 12"
7	Peter Winnen (NED)	Panasonic–Raleigh	+ 14"
8	Gerard Veldscholten (NED)	Panasonic–Raleigh	s.t.
9	Pedro Muñoz (ESP)	Fagor	s.t.
10	Éric Caritoux (FRA)	Skil–Sem–Kas–Miko	+ 15"

== Stage 5 ==
28 April 1985 — Lugo to Oviedo, 238 km (148 mi)

Stage 5 result

Rank	Rider	Team	Time
1	Federico Echave (ESP)	Teka	7h 13' 50"
2	Sean Kelly (IRL)	Skil–Sem–Kas–Miko	+ 1"
3	Eddy Planckaert (BEL)	Panasonic–Raleigh	s.t.
4	Jesús Suárez Cueva (ESP)	Hueso	s.t.
5	Antonio Esparza (ESP)	Kelme–Merckx	s.t.
6	José Luis Navarro (ESP)	Zor–Gemeaz Cusin	s.t.
7	Noël Dejonckheere (BEL)	Teka	s.t.
8	Miguel Ángel Iglesias (ESP)	Kelme–Merckx	s.t.
9	Pello Ruiz Cabestany (ESP)	Orbea–Gin MG	s.t.
10	Patrick Verschueren (BEL)	Safir–Van de Ven	s.t.

General classification after Stage 5

Rank	Rider	Team	Time
1	Miguel Induráin (ESP)	Reynolds	27h 46' 56"
2	Sean Kelly (IRL)	Skil–Sem–Kas–Miko	+ 5"
3	Pello Ruiz Cabestany (ESP)	Orbea–Gin MG	+ 6"
4	Jesús Blanco Villar (ESP)	Teka	s.t.
5	José Recio (ESP)	Kelme–Merckx	+ 9"
6	Steven Rooks (NED)	Panasonic–Raleigh	+ 12"
7	Peter Winnen (NED)	Panasonic–Raleigh	+ 14"
8	Gerard Veldscholten (NED)	Panasonic–Raleigh	s.t.
9	Pedro Muñoz (ESP)	Fagor	s.t.
10	Éric Caritoux (FRA)	Skil–Sem–Kas–Miko	+ 15"

== Stage 6 ==
29 April 1985 — Oviedo to Lakes of Covadonga, 145 km (90 mi)

Stage 6 result

Rank	Rider	Team	Time
1	Pedro Delgado (ESP)	Orbea–Gin MG	4h 33' 08"
2	Robert Millar (GBR)	Peugeot–Shell–Michelin	+ 12"
3	Álvaro Pino (ESP)	Zor–Gemeaz Cusin	+ 16"
4	Fabio Parra (COL)	Varta–Café de Colombia–Mavic	+ 20"
5	Pello Ruiz Cabestany (ESP)	Orbea–Gin MG	s.t.
6	Luis Herrera (COL)	Varta–Café de Colombia–Mavic	+ 26"
7	Francisco Rodríguez (COL)	Zor–Gemeaz Cusin	s.t.
8	Reimund Dietzen (FRG)	Teka	+ 1' 11"
9	Pablo Wilches (COL)	Varta–Café de Colombia–Mavic	+ 1' 28"
10	Iñaki Gastón (ESP)	Reynolds	+ 1' 38"

General classification after Stage 6

Rank	Rider	Team	Time
1	Pedro Delgado (ESP)	Orbea–Gin MG	32h 20' 23"
2	Pello Ruiz Cabestany (ESP)	Orbea–Gin MG	+ 7"
3	Robert Millar (GBR)	Peugeot–Shell–Michelin	+ 13"
4	Álvaro Pino (ESP)	Zor–Gemeaz Cusin	+ 33"
5	Francisco Rodríguez (COL)	Zor–Gemeaz Cusin	+ 42"
6	Fabio Parra (COL)	Varta–Café de Colombia–Mavic	+ 1' 19"
7	Reimund Dietzen (FRG)	Teka	+ 1' 28"
8	Pedro Muñoz (ESP)	Fagor	+ 1' 35"
9	Jesús Rodríguez Magro (ESP)	Zor–Gemeaz Cusin	+ 1' 43"
10	Iñaki Gastón (ESP)	Reynolds	+ 1' 58"

== Stage 7 ==
30 April 1985 — Cangas de Onís to Alto Campoo, 190 km (120 mi)

Stage 7 result

Rank	Rider	Team	Time
1	Antonio Agudelo (COL)	Varta–Café de Colombia–Mavic	5h 56' 49"
2	Robert Millar (GBR)	Peugeot–Shell–Michelin	s.t.
3	Pello Ruiz Cabestany (ESP)	Orbea–Gin MG	s.t.
4	Samuel Cabrera (COL)	Varta–Café de Colombia–Mavic	+ 8"
5	Francisco Rodríguez (COL)	Zor–Gemeaz Cusin	s.t.
6	Pedro Muñoz (ESP)	Fagor	+ 58"
7	Reimund Dietzen (FRG)	Teka	+ 1' 03"
8	Fabio Parra (COL)	Varta–Café de Colombia–Mavic	+ 1' 08"
9	Pascal Simon (FRA)	Peugeot–Shell–Michelin	+ 1' 15"
10	José Luis Navarro (ESP)	Zor–Gemeaz Cusin	+ 1' 22"

General classification after Stage 7

Rank	Rider	Team	Time
1	Pello Ruiz Cabestany (ESP)	Orbea–Gin MG	38h 17' 19"
2	Robert Millar (GBR)	Peugeot–Shell–Michelin	+ 6"
3	Francisco Rodríguez (COL)	Zor–Gemeaz Cusin	+ 43"
4	Fabio Parra (COL)	Varta–Café de Colombia–Mavic	+ 2' 20"
5	Reimund Dietzen (FRG)	Teka	+ 2' 24"
6	Pedro Muñoz (ESP)	Fagor	+ 2' 26"
7	Iñaki Gastón (ESP)	Reynolds	+ 3' 13"
8	José Luis Navarro (ESP)	Zor–Gemeaz Cusin	+ 3' 16"
9	Jesús Blanco Villar (ESP)	Teka	+ 3' 30"
10	Antonio Agudelo (COL)	Varta–Café de Colombia–Mavic	+ 3' 36"

== Stage 8 ==
1 May 1985 — Aguilar de Campoo to Logroño, 224 km (139 mi)

Stage 8 result

Rank	Rider	Team	Time
1	Ángel Camarillo (ESP)	Zor–Gemeaz Cusin	6h 25' 12"
2	Juan Fernandez (ESP)	Zor–Gemeaz Cusin	+ 6' 57"
3	José Recio (ESP)	Kelme–Merckx	s.t.
4	Iñaki Gastón (ESP)	Reynolds	s.t.
5	Alexander Osipov (URS)	USSR Selection (amateur)	s.t.
6	Vladimir Voloshin (URS)	USSR Selection (amateur)	s.t.
7	Sean Kelly (IRL)	Skil–Sem–Kas–Miko	+ 6' 59"
8	Giovanni Mantovani (ITA)	Supermercati Brianzoli	s.t.
9	Francis Castaing (FRA)	Peugeot–Shell–Michelin	s.t.
10	Herman Frison (BEL)	Safir–Van de Ven	s.t.

General classification after Stage 8

Rank	Rider	Team	Time
1	Pello Ruiz Cabestany (ESP)	Orbea–Gin MG	44h 49' 30"
2	Robert Millar (GBR)	Peugeot–Shell–Michelin	+ 6"
3	Francisco Rodríguez (COL)	Zor–Gemeaz Cusin	+ 43"
4	Fabio Parra (COL)	Varta–Café de Colombia–Mavic	+ 2' 20"
5	Reimund Dietzen (FRG)	Teka	+ 2' 24"
6	Pedro Muñoz (ESP)	Fagor	+ 2' 26"
7	Iñaki Gastón (ESP)	Reynolds	+ 3' 11"
8	José Luis Navarro (ESP)	Zor–Gemeaz Cusin	+ 3' 16"
9	Jesús Blanco Villar (ESP)	Teka	+ 3' 30"
10	Antonio Agudelo (COL)	Varta–Café de Colombia–Mavic	+ 3' 36"

== Stage 9 ==
2 May 1985 — Logroño to Balneario de Panticosa, 253 km (157 mi)

Stage 9 result

Rank	Rider	Team	Time
1	Alfons De Wolf (BEL)	Fagor	6h 42' 14"
2	Philippe Poissonnier (FRA)	Skil–Sem–Kas–Miko	+ 3' 04"
3	Fabio Parra (COL)	Varta–Café de Colombia–Mavic	+ 19' 06"
4	Pedro Delgado (ESP)	Orbea–Gin MG	+ 19' 10"
5	Pablo Wilches (COL)	Varta–Café de Colombia–Mavic	+ 19' 12"
6	Antonio Agudelo (COL)	Varta–Café de Colombia–Mavic	+ 19' 25"
7	Pello Ruiz Cabestany (ESP)	Orbea–Gin MG	+ 19' 28"
8	Francisco Rodríguez (COL)	Zor–Gemeaz Cusin	s.t.
9	Robert Millar (GBR)	Peugeot–Shell–Michelin	s.t.
10	Julián Gorospe (ESP)	Reynolds	s.t.

General classification after Stage 9

Rank	Rider	Team	Time
1	Pello Ruiz Cabestany (ESP)	Orbea–Gin MG	51h 51' 12"
2	Robert Millar (GBR)	Peugeot–Shell–Michelin	+ 6"
3	Francisco Rodríguez (COL)	Zor–Gemeaz Cusin	+ 43"
4	Fabio Parra (COL)	Varta–Café de Colombia–Mavic	+ 1' 58"
5	Reimund Dietzen (FRG)	Teka	+ 2' 56"
6	Pedro Delgado (ESP)	Orbea–Gin MG	+ 3' 24"
7	Iñaki Gastón (ESP)	Reynolds	s.t.
8	José Luis Navarro (ESP)	Zor–Gemeaz Cusin	+ 3' 29"
9	Antonio Agudelo (COL)	Varta–Café de Colombia–Mavic	+ 3' 33"
10	Julián Gorospe (ESP)	Reynolds	+ 3' 51"
