= 1986 Volta a Catalunya =

Race details
- Dates: 9–18 September 1986
- Stages: 8 + Prologue
- Distance: 1,148.9 km (713.9 mi)
- Winning time: 30h 07' 03"

Results
	Winner	Sean Kelly (IRL)	(Kas)
	Second	Álvaro Pino (ESP)	(Zor–BH)
	Third	Charly Mottet (FRA)	(Système U)
	Points	Sean Kelly (IRL)	(Kas)
	Mountains	Juan Fernández (ESP)	(Zor–BH)
	Sprints	Isidro Juárez (ESP)	(Zahor Chocolates)
	Team	Kas	

The 1986 Volta a Catalunya was the 66th edition of the Volta a Catalunya cycle race and was held from 9 September to 18 September 1986. The race started in Platja d'Aro and finished in Barcelona. The race was won by Sean Kelly of the Kas team.

== General classification ==
Final general classification

Rank	Rider	Team	Time
1	Sean Kelly (IRL)	Kas	30h 07' 03"
2	Álvaro Pino (ESP)	Zor–BH	+ 1' 33"
3	Charly Mottet (FRA)	Système U	+ 1' 37"
4	Anselmo Fuerte (ESP)	Zor–BH	+ 1' 41"
5	Acácio da Silva (POR)	Kas	+ 2' 09"
6	Marino Lejarreta (ESP)	Seat–Orbea	+ 2' 09"
7	Pedro Delgado (ESP)	PDM–Ultima–Concorde	+ 3' 05"
8	Carlos Hernández (ESP)	Reynolds	+ 3' 23"
9	José Recio (ESP)	Kelme	+ 3' 47"
10	Pello Ruiz Cabestany (ESP)	Seat–Orbea	+ 5' 02"
