= Vladimir Malakhov (cyclist) =

Soviet cyclist

Personal information
- Born: 1958 (age 67–68) Soviet Union

Cycling career
- Sport: Cycling
- Discipline: Road
- Role: Rider

Major wins
- Grand Tours Vuelta a España 1 individual stage (1985)

Vladimir Malakhov (Russian Владимир Малахов; born 1958) is a Soviet and Russian former road cyclist.

Malakhov was the first Soviet cyclist to win a stage in a Grand Tour. He won Stage 19 of the 1985 Vuelta a España as part of the USSR amateur team. He won the mass sprint ahead of Noël Dejonckheere and Sean Kelly. Originally Dejonckheere was declared the winner of the stage but after looking at the finish photo Malakhov was announced to have won. In Stage 16 he won the bunch sprint for second place, 43 seconds behind winner Isidro Juárez. He finished the race 71st overall over two hours down from winner Pedro Delgado. Malakhov also finished second in two of the race's other classifications: the sprint classification behind Ronny Van Holen and in the special sprint classification behind Jesús Suárez Cueva.

== Major results ==
1980
1st Overall Triptyque Ardennaise

1st Stage 3a

1981
1st Overall Gyros Thysias
1982
National Road Championships

2nd Road race
3rd Criterium

9th Overall Giro Ciclistico d'Italia

1st Prologue (TTT)

1983
1st Stages 5 & 8 Giro Ciclistico d'Italia
1984
1st Trofeo Papà Cervi
1st Criterium, National Road Championships
1985
1st Stage 19 Vuelta a España

=== Grand Tour result ===
| Grand Tour | 1985 |
|---|---|
| Vuelta a España | 71 |
| Giro d'Italia | – |
| Tour de France | – |
