= 1983 Volta a Catalunya =

Race details
- Dates: 7–14 September 1983
- Stages: 7 + Prologue
- Distance: 1,270.1 km (789.2 mi)
- Winning time: 32h 28' 11"

Results
	Winner	José Recio (ESP)	(Kelme)
	Second	Faustino Rupérez (ESP)	(Zor–Gemeaz Cusin)
	Third	Julius Thalmann (SUI)	(Cilo–Aufina)
	Points	Frank Hoste (BEL)	(Europ Decor–Dries)
	Mountains	Ángel Ocaña (ESP)	(Zor–Gemeaz Cusin)
	Sprints	Ronny Van Holen (BEL)	(Safir–Van de Ven)
	Team	TI–Raleigh–Campagnolo	

The 1983 Volta a Catalunya was the 63rd edition of the Volta a Catalunya cycle race and was held from 7 September to 14 September 1983. The race started in Salou and finished at Igualada. The race was won by José Recio of the Kelme team.

== General classification ==
Final general classification

Rank	Rider	Team	Time
1	José Recio (ESP)	Kelme	32h 28' 11"
2	Faustino Rupérez (ESP)	Zor–Gemeaz Cusin	+ 4' 26"
3	Julius Thalmann (SUI)	Cilo–Aufina	+ 4' 27"
4	Gerard Veldscholten (NED)	TI–Raleigh–Campagnolo	+ 4' 34"
5	Pedro Delgado (ESP)	Reynolds	+ 5' 01"
6	Julián Gorospe (ESP)	Reynolds	+ 6' 05"
7	Henk Lubberding (NED)	TI–Raleigh–Campagnolo	+ 6' 07"
8	José Luis Laguía (ESP)	Reynolds	+ 6' 43"
9	Faustino Cuelli (ESP)	Teka	+ 7' 02"
10	Vicente Belda (ESP)	Kelme	+ 7' 07"
