= 1985 Tour of the Basque Country =

Race details
- Dates: 1–5 April 1985
- Stages: 5
- Distance: 877 km (544.9 mi)
- Winning time: 22h 44' 27"

Results
	Winner	Pello Ruiz Cabestany (ESP)	(Orbea–Gin MG)
	Second	Greg LeMond (USA)	(La Vie Claire)
	Third	Marino Lejarreta (ESP)	(Alpilatte–Olmo–Cierre)

The 1985 Tour of the Basque Country was the 25th edition of the Tour of the Basque Country cycle race and was held from 1 April to 5 April 1985. The race started in Bera and finished in Erauskin. The race was won by Pello Ruiz Cabestany of the Orbea–Gin MG team.

== General classification ==
Final general classification

Rank	Rider	Team	Time
1	Pello Ruiz Cabestany (ESP)	Orbea–Gin MG	22h 44' 27"
2	Greg LeMond (USA)	La Vie Claire	+ 29"
3	Marino Lejarreta (ESP)	Alpilatte–Olmo–Cierre	+ 46"
4	José Recio (ESP)	Kelme–Merckx	+ 1' 15"
5	Pedro Delgado (ESP)	Orbea–Gin MG	+ 1' 18"
6	Sean Kelly (IRL)	Skil–Sem–Kas–Miko	+ 1' 31"
7	José Luis Laguía (ESP)	Reynolds	+ 1' 53"
8	Jörg Muller (SUI)	Skil–Sem–Kas–Miko	+ 2' 07"
9	Claude Criquielion (BEL)	Hitachi–Splendor–Sunair	+ 2' 39"
10	Federico Echave (ESP)	Teka	+ 2' 49"
