= 1986 Tour of the Basque Country =

Race details
- Dates: 7–11 April 1986
- Stages: 5
- Distance: 787.7 km (489.5 mi)
- Winning time: 20h 21' 53"

Results
	Winner	Sean Kelly (IRL)	(Kas)
	Second	Maurizio Rossi (ITA)	(Ecoflam–Jollyscarpe–BFB Bruciatori–Alfa Lum)
	Third	Federico Echave (ESP)	(Teka)

The 1986 Tour of the Basque Country was the 26th edition of the Tour of the Basque Country cycle race and was held from 7 April to 11 April 1986. The race started in Antzuola and finished in Andoain. The race was won by Sean Kelly of the Kas team.

== General classification ==
Final general classification

Rank	Rider	Team	Time
1	Sean Kelly (IRL)	Kas	20h 21' 53"
2	Maurizio Rossi (ITA)	Ecoflam–Jollyscarpe–BFB Bruciatori–Alfa Lum	+ 18"
3	Federico Echave (ESP)	Teka	+ 1' 08"
4	Anselmo Fuerte (ESP)	Zor–BH	+ 1' 12"
5	Jesús Blanco Villar (ESP)	Teka	+ 1' 21"
6	Iñaki Gastón (ESP)	Kas	+ 1' 24"
7	Reimund Dietzen (FRG)	Teka	+ 1' 25"
8	Martin Earley (IRL)	Fagor	+ 1' 33"
9	Pello Ruiz Cabestany (ESP)	Seat–Orbea	+ 1' 42"
10	Ángel Arroyo (ESP)	Reynolds	+ 1' 46"
