= 1985 Vuelta a España =

Race details
- Dates: 23 April – 12 May
- Stages: 19 + prologue
- Distance: 3,474 km (2,159 mi)
- Winning time: 95h 58' 00"

Results
Jersey awarded to the overall winner	Winner	Pedro Delgado (ESP)	(Orbea)
	Second	Robert Millar (GBR)	(Peugeot–Shell–Michelin)
	Third	Francisco Rodríguez (COL)	(Zor)
Jersey awarded to the points classification winner	Points	Sean Kelly (IRL)	(Skil–Sem–Reydel)
Jersey awarded to the mountains classification winner	Mountains	José Luis Laguía (ESP)	(Reynolds)
Jersey awarded to the young rider classification winner	Young rider	Fabio Parra (COL)	(Café de Colombia)
Jersey awarded to the combination classification winner	Combination	Robert Millar (GBR)	(Peugeot–Shell–Michelin)
Jersey awarded to the sprints classification winner	Sprints	Ronny Van Holen (BEL)	(Safir)
	Team	Zor–Gemeaz	

The 40th Edition Vuelta a España (Tour of Spain), a long-distance bicycle stage race and one of the 3 grand tours, was held from 23 April to 12 May 1985. It consisted of 19 stages covering a total of 3,474 km. The race was won by Pedro Delgado of the Orbea cycling team.

== Pre-race favourites ==
The Spanish favourites for the general classification of the race were Pedro Delgado, Faustino Rupérez and Pello Ruiz Cabestany and the potential foreign favourites included Robert Millar – now known as Philippa York, Sean Kelly, Éric Caritoux, Peter Winnen and Gianbattista Baronchelli.

== Route ==
List of stages
Stage	Date	Course	Distance	Type	Winner
P	23 April	Valladolid to Valladolid	5.6 km (3 mi)	Individual time trial	Bert Oosterbosch (NED)
1	24 April	Valladolid to Zamora	177 km (110 mi)		Eddy Planckaert (BEL)
2	25 April	Zamora to Orense	262 km (163 mi)		Sean Kelly (IRL)
3	26 April	Ourense to Santiago de Compostela	197 km (122 mi)		Gianbattista Baronchelli (ITA)
4	27 April	Santiago de Compostela to Lugo	162 km (101 mi)		Eddy Planckaert (BEL)
5	28 April	Lugo to Oviedo	238 km (148 mi)		Federico Echave (ESP)
6	29 April	Oviedo to Lakes of Covadonga	145 km (90 mi)		Pedro Delgado (ESP)
7	30 April	Cangas de Onís to Alto Campoo	190 km (118 mi)		Antonio Agudelo (COL)
8	1 May	Aguilar de Campoo to Logroño	224 km (139 mi)		Ángel Camarillo (ESP)
9	2 May	Logroño to Balneario de Panticosa	253 km (157 mi)		Alfons De Wolf (BEL)
10	3 May	Sabiñánigo to Tremp	209 km (130 mi)		Sean Kelly (IRL)
11	4 May	Tremp to Andorra	124 km (77 mi)		Francisco Rodríguez (COL)
12	5 May	Andorra to Pal (Andorra)	16 km (10 mi)	Individual time trial	Francisco Rodríguez (COL)
13	6 May	Andorra to Sant Quirze del Vallès	193 km (120 mi)		Ángel Sarrapio (ESP)
14	7 May	Valencia to Benidorm	201 km (125 mi)		José Recio (ESP)
15	8 May	Benidorm to Albacete	208 km (129 mi)		Sean Kelly (IRL)
16	9 May	Albacete to Alcalá de Henares	252 km (157 mi)		Isidro Juárez (ESP)
17	10 May	Alcalá de Henares to Alcalá de Henares	43 km (27 mi)	Individual time trial	Pello Ruiz Cabestany (ESP)
18	11 May	Alcalá de Henares to Palazuelos de Eresma (Destilerías DYC)	200 km (124 mi)		José Recio (ESP)
19	12 May	Palazuelos de Eresma (Destilerías DYC) to Salamanca	175 km (109 mi)		Vladimir Malakhov (URS)
	Total		3,474 km (2,159 mi)		

== Race overview ==
In 1985 the Vuelta a España was still held in its April – May slot as the first of the three grand tours of the season. A young Miguel Induráin took the lead on stage 2. Pedro Delgado won stage 6 to the Lagos de Covadonga and took over the race leader's jersey. Delgado lost the lead the following day to Pello Ruiz Cabestany. Robert Millar – now known as Philippa York – then took the lead after the tenth stage, a stage won by Kelly.

Millar held the lead going into what has become one of the most infamous days in the history of the event, the penultimate day of the race, stage 18. Millar started the day 10 seconds ahead of Colombian Francisco 'Pacho' Rodríguez, with Spain's Pello Ruiz Cabestany 65 seconds further behind in third. With the following day's last stage of the race little more than ceremonial, Millar said to the press, "I just have to stick to Pacho Rodríguez's wheel and it's done." A mountainous stage with three major climbs, Rodriguez tried but was unable to make a successful attack on Millar on the first climb of the day, the Morcuera. At the foot of the second climb, the Cotos, Millar punctured meaning once the puncture had been fixed Millar had to chase to get back to Rodrigues and Cabestany. By the time the riders reached the third climb, Los Leones, Millar had not only reached the main GC favorites, but was also taking their congratulations indicating their submission that the race over as a contest.

Millar, however, was unaware that Delgado, in the mountains around his Segovia hometown that he knew like the back of his hand, had launched an attack. None of the riders in Millar's group made him aware of the attack by Delgado – an elite specialist climber like Millar, and in this case with the knowledge of the roads allowing him to descend aggressively. Delgado had support in his break from a second rider, José Recio. Delgado had started the day in sixth place and 6 minutes behind Millar. Working with Recio, Delgado was now nearly 7 minutes ahead of Millar on the road. Millar had none of his teammates in this group with the other contenders and was isolated. Recio won the stage and Delgado took overall lead of the race. With the race now referred to as "The stolen Vuelta", because of the collusion among the Spanish-speaking riders, Millar finished second overall. Peugeot directeur sportif, Roland Berland, said, "It's rotten, the whole peloton was against us. It seems a Spaniard had to win at all costs." L'Équipe's Philip Bouvet stated, Millar was "the victim of a formidable Spanish coalition". Millar said afterwards, "I'll never return to Spain." In the television documentary on York, "The High Life", Millar criticised Berland for his handling of the situation on the road when Delgado attacked. Berland had been unable to negotiate support from other non-Spanish-speaking teams during the stage to give Millar the required support to chase down Delgado's lead.

In 1985 and 1986, a national team of the communist Soviet Union participated in the Vuelta. At the time, it was unusual for Soviet riders to participate in professional races.

1985 also saw the Vuelta participation of a U.S. professional team for the first time; the team was sponsored by Rank-Xerox and managed by Robin Morton, the first woman to manage a men's professional cycling team.

== General classification (final) ==
Rank	Rider	Team	Time
1	(Spain) Pedro Delgado	Orbea	95h 58' 00"
2	(United Kingdom) Robert Millar	Peugeot–Shell–Michelin	+ 36"
3	(Colombia) Francisco Rodríguez	Zor	+ 46"
4	(Spain) Pello Ruiz Cabestany	Orbea	+ 1' 51"
5	(Colombia) Fabio Parra	Café de Colombia	+ 3' 40"
6	(France) Éric Caritoux	Skil–Sem–Reydel	+ 6' 08"
7	(Germany) Raimund Dietzen	Teka	+ 6' 36"
8	(Spain) Álvaro Pino	Zor	+ 7' 41"
9	(Republic of Ireland) Sean Kelly	Skil–Sem–Reydel	+ 7' 52"
10	(Spain) José Luis Navarro	Zor	+ 8' 56"
11	(Spain) Julián Gorospe	Reynolds	
12	(Spain) Celestino Prieto Rodriguez	Reynolds	
13	(Netherlands) Gerard Veldscholten	Panasonic	
14	(France) Pascal Simon	Peugeot–Shell–Michelin	
15	(France) Pierre Bazzo	Fagor	
16	(Spain) Juan Tomás Martínez Gutierrez	Hueso–Motta	
17	(Spain) Antonio Coll Pontanilla	Teka	
18	(Spain) Vicente Belda	Kelme–Merckx	
19	(Spain) Faustino Rupérez Rincón	Zor	
20	(Soviet Union) Ivan Ivanov	Soviet National Team	
21	(Spain) Ignacio Gaston Crespo	Reynolds	
22	(Spain) Ángel de las Heras	Hueso–Motta	
23	(Colombia) Martín Ramírez	Café de Colombia	
24	(France) Dominique Garde	Skil–Sem–Reydel	
25	(France) Gilles Mas	Skil–Sem–Reydel	
