= Artiach (cycling team) =

Team information
- Registered: Spain
- Founded: 1984
- Disbanded: 1995
- Discipline: Road

Team name history
- 1984 January 1985 – June 1985 July 1985 – 1986 January 1987 – March 1987 April 1987 – 1988 January 1989 – June 1989 July 1989 – December 1989 January 1990 – June 1990 July 1990 – 1992 1993 1994 1995: Orbea–Danena; Orbea–Gin MG; Seat–Orbea; Seat–Orbea–Danena; Caja Rural–Orbea; Caja Rural; Paternina; Orbea–Alimentos de España; Artiach–Royal; Artiach–Filipinos–Chiquilin; Artiach–Nabisco; Artiach–Chiquilin

Artiach was a Spanish professional cycling team that existed from 1984 to 1995. It was merged into the Kelme–Sureña team for the 1996 season, becoming Kelme–Artiach. Pedro Delgado won the general classification of the 1985 Vuelta a España with the team.

== Team Sponsors ==
Artiach had a number of co-sponsors over the team history.

The 1993 Team Artiach - Filipinos - Chiquilin was supplied by Rossin Bikes.

== 1995 Roster ==
As at 31 December 1995

Rider	Date of birth
Alfredo Clavero (ESP)	27 September 1971 (aged 24)
Daniel Clavero (ESP)	9 August 1968 (aged 27)
Julio Coello (ESP)	18 February 1969 (aged 26)
Américo José Neves Da Silva (POR)	12 July 1964 (aged 31)
Unai Etxebarria (VEN)	21 November 1972 (aged 23)
Ramón Garcia (ESP)	13 December 1970 (aged 25)
José Manuel Garcia (ESP)	16 March 1968 (aged 27)
Félix García Casas (ESP)	29 December 1968 (aged 27)
Leon Giner (ESP)	22 January 1969 (aged 26)
Junichi Kikuta (JPN)	8 December 1966 (aged 29)

Rider	Date of birth
Mariano Moreda (ESP)	11 February 1971 (aged 24)
Asensio Navarro (ESP)	17 November 1970 (aged 25)
Manuel Pascual (ESP)	20 October 1969 (aged 26)
Orlando Rodrigues (POR)	21 October 1969 (aged 26)
José Luis Rubiera (ESP)	27 January 1973 (aged 22)
Rafael Ruiz (ESP)	21 September 1971 (aged 24)
Asiat Saitov (RUS)	1 January 1965 (aged 30)
Antonio Sánchez (ESP)	1 October 1970 (aged 25)
Jose Luis Santamaria (ESP)	28 December 1968 (aged 27)

== Major wins ==
1984
Stage 4 Volta a la Comunitat Valenciana, Pello Ruiz
Stage 2 Setmana Catalana de Ciclisme, Felipe Yáñez De La Torre
Stage 2 Tour of the Basque Country, Jon Koldo Urien Gomez
Stage 2 Volta a Galicia, Jokin Mújika
1985
Stage 4 Vuelta a Murcia, Felipe Yáñez De La Torre
Overall Tour of the Basque Country, Pello Ruiz
Stage 5 Vuelta a Cantabria, Manuel Murga Sáez De Ormijana
Stage 4 Vuelta a Castilla y León, Mathieu Hermans
Overall Vuelta a España, Pedro Delgado

Stage 6, Pedro Delgado
Stage 17, Pello Ruiz

Stage 17 Tour de France, Pedro Delgado
Stage 4 Vuelta a Burgos, Santiago Izuzkiza Aguirrebengoa
Prologue and Stage 5 Griffin 1000, Manuel Jorge Domínguez
Stage 7 Vuelta a Castilla y León, Felipe Yáñez De La Torre
1986
Vuelta al Bidasoa, Jesus Arambarri Arregui
Vuelta a Murcia

Stage 2, Manuel Jorge Domínguez
Stage 3 TTT

Vuelta a España

Stage 2, Manuel Jorge Domínguez
Stage 8, Marino Lejarreta

Stage 3 Tour de Romandie, Mathieu Hermans
Stage 5 Vuelta a los Valles Mineros, Jaime Vilamajo Ipiens
Stages 2 & 7 Vuelta a Aragón, Mathieu Hermans
Stage 3 GP du Midi Libre, Pello Ruiz
Stage 5 Vuelta a Cantabria, Jose Salvador Sanchis
Stage 9 Vuelta a Castilla y León, Vicente Ridaura
Stage 4 Tour de France, Pello Ruiz
Overall Vuelta a Burgos, Marino Lejarreta
Trofeo Masferrer, Antonio Esparza
Stage 7 Volta Catalunya, Pello Ruiz
Stage 3 Vuelta a La Rioja, Manuel Jorge Domínguez
Subida al Naranco, Marino Lejarreta
Memorial Manuel Galera, Vicente Ridaura
1987
Stage 4 Vuelta a Andalucía, Pascal Jules
GP Albacete, Marcel Arntz
GP Camp de Morvedre, Roland Le Clerc
Trofeo Luis Puig, Pello Ruiz
Stages 1, 2 & 3 Comunitat Valenciana, Mathieu Hermans
Overall Vuelta a Murcia, Pello Ruiz

Stages 4 & 6, Pello Ruiz

Stage 2 Vuelta a Castilla y León, Pello Ruiz
Paris–Camembert, Mathieu Hermans
Vuelta a España

Stages 9 & 15, Antonio Esparza
Stage 22, Jaime Vilamajo Ipiens

Stage 1 Vuelta a los Valles Mineros, Antonio Esparza
Stage 6 Vuelta a Asturias, Manuel Murga Sáez De Ormijana
Overall Euskal Bizikleta, Marino Lejarreta
GP Caboalles de Abajo, Pello Ruiz
Gran Premio de Llodio, Pello Ruiz
Overall Vuelta a Burgos, Marino Lejarreta

Prologue & Stage 5, Marino Lejarreta
Stage 2 TTT

Clásica Ciclista de San Sebastián, Marino Lejarreta
Subida a Urkiola, Marino Lejarreta
Stage 4 Ronde van Nederland, Mathieu Hermans
Volta a Galicia, Jokin Mújika
1988
GP Albacete, Mathieu Hermans
Stages 3 & 6 Comunitat Valenciana, Mathieu Hermans
Vuelta a Murcia

Stages 1, 2, 3 & 4, Mathieu Hermans
Stage 5, TTT

Stages 1, 2 & 3 Setmana Catalana de Ciclisme, Mathieu Hermans
Stages 4, 6, 7, 10, 16 & 21 Vuelta a España, Mathieu Hermans
Overall Euskal Bizikleta, Jokin Mújika

Stage 3, Jokin Mújika

Prueba Villafranca de Ordizia, Marino Lejarreta
Overall Vuelta a Burgos, Marino Lejarreta

Prologue, Marino Lejarreta

Subida a Urkiola, Marino Lejarreta
Stage 4 Ronde van Nederland, Mathieu Hermans
Volta a Galicia, Marino Lejarreta
Trofeo Masferrer, Mathieu Hermans
Stage 1 Volta Catalunya, Mathieu Hermans
Overall Escalada a Montjuïc, Marino Lejarreta

Stages 1 & 2, Marino Lejarreta

1989
Trofeo Luis Puig, Mathieu Hermans
Grand Prix de Cannes, Roland Le Clerc
Route du Pays Basque, Roland Le Clerc
Klasika Primavera, Marino Lejarreta
Omloop Leiedal, Ludo Peeters
Vuelta a España

Stage 3 TTT
Stages 14, 15 & 20, Mathieu Hermans

Tour de Luxembourg

Stage 1, Mathieu Hermans
Stage 5, Roland Le Clerc

Stage 11 Tour de France, Mathieu Hermans
Prueba Villafranca de Ordizia, Marino Lejarreta
Clásica a los Puertos de Guadarrama, Jokin Mújika
Overall Volta a Catalunya, Marino Lejarreta

Stage 1, Mathieu Hermans

Stage 2 Vuelta a La Rioja, Marino Lejarreta
Trio Normand, Roland Le Clerc
Overall Herald Sun Tour, Marcel Arntz

Stage 11, Stephen Hodge
Stage 15, Marcel Arntz

1990
Stage 7 Olympia's Tour, Dick Dekker
Stages 3a, 4 & 6 Troféu Joaquim Agostinho, Neil Stephens
Volta a Portugal

Stages 2 & 3, Dick Dekker
Stage 5, Neil Stephens
Stage 11, José Antonio Sanchez Valencia

Stages 1 & 2 Vuelta Ciclista a La Rioja, Dick Dekker
Stage 9 Herald Sun Tour, Neil Stephens
1991
Stage 1 Troféu Joaquim Agostinho, Juan Carlos Arribas
Volta a Portugal

Stage 2, José Antonio Sánchez
Stage 4, Vicente Juan Ridaura
Stage 5, José Santiago

1992
Stages 3 & 4 Vuelta a Mallorca, Alfonso Gutiérrez
Stage 2 Vuelta Asturias, Alfonso Gutiérrez
Stages 2 & 4 Volta a Portugal, Asier Guenetxea
Stage 5 Vuelta a Castilla y León, Asier Guenetxea
Stage 9 Volta a Portugal, Vicente Juan Ridaura
1993
Stage 1 Vuelta Ciclista a la Comunidad Valenciana, Alfonso Gutiérrez
Vuelta a Murcia

Stage 3, Alfonso Gutiérrez
Stage 5b, Erwin Nijboer

Stage 2 Vuelta a España, Alfonso Gutiérrez
Grande Prémio Jornal de Notícias

Stage 4, Orlando Sergio Rodrigues
Stage 6, Américo José Neves Da Silva

Clásica de Sabiñánigo, Asier Guenetxea
Vuelta a Castilla y León

Stage 2, Asier Guenetxea
Stage 3, Alfonso Gutiérrez

Volta a Portugal

Stage 5, Luis Espinosa
Stage 7, Américo José Neves Da Silva

Stage 3 Vuelta a Burgos, Alfonso Gutiérrez
1994
Circuito de Getxo, Orlando Sergio Rodrigues
Vuelta a Mallorca

Stages 3a & 5, Alfonso Gutiérrez
Stage 3b, Asier Guenetxea

Stage 2 Vuelta a los Valles Mineros, Juan Rodrigo Arenas
Stage 5 Vuelta Asturias, Luis Alberto Camargo
Portugal Portuguese National Road Race Championships, Orlando Sergio Rodrigues
Troféu Joaquim Agostinho

Stage 1, Américo José Neves Da Silva
Stage 3, Asier Guenetxea
Stage 7, Orlando Sergio Rodrigues

Overall Volta a Portugal, Orlando Sergio Rodrigues

Stage 3, Orlando Sergio Rodrigues

1995
Trofeo Comunidad Foral de Navarra, Felix Manuel García Casas
Stage 5a Vuelta Ciclista al Pais Vasco, Asiat Saitov
Stage 3 Vuelta a los Valles Mineros, Rafael Ruiz
Overall Volta ao Alentejo, Asiat Saitov

Stages 1 & 2, Asiat Saitov

Stage 2 Grande Prémio Jornal de Notícias, Mariano Moreda
Stage 3 Vuelta Ciclista a La Rioja, Mariano Moreda
Russia Russian National Road Race Championships, Asiat Saitov
Overall Troféu Joaquim Agostinho, Orlando Sergio Rodrigues

Stages 1 & 2, Mariano Moreda

Overall Volta a Portugal, Orlando Sergio Rodrigues

Stage 5, Orlando Sergio Rodrigues

Stage 18 Vuelta a España, Asiat Saitov

== Supplementary statistics ==
Grand Tours by highest finishing position
Race	1984	1985	1986	1987	1988	1989	1990	1991	1992	1993	1994	1995
Giro d'Italia	–	–	–	4	–	10	–	–	–	32	–	–
Tour de France	–	6	18	10	16	5	–	–	–	–	–	–
Vuelta a España	15	1	5	28	14	19	–	49	37	22	10	8
Major week-long stage races by highest finishing position
Race	1984	1985	1986	1987	1988	1989	1990	1991	1992	1993	1994	1995
Paris–Nice	–	19	–	–	–	–	–	–	–	–	–	DNF
Tirreno–Adriatico	–	–	–	–	22	–	–	–	–	–	–	–
Volta a Catalunya	13	9	6	9	3	1	55	38	15	18	5	7
Tour of the Basque Country	8	1	11	10	4	8	–	13	20	35	39	16
Tour de Romandie	–	–	? (Note: A Stage was won by a rider but no record of top placing rider exists)	–	–	–	–	–	–	–	–	–
Critérium du Dauphiné	Never Raced											
Tour de Suisse	–	–	–	–	–	23	–	–	–	–	–	–
Vuelta a Burgos	10	7	1	1	1	7	–	9	19	16	18	15
Ronde van Nederland	–	11	15	4	16	–	–	–	–	45	–	–
Monument races by highest finishing position
Race	1984	1985	1986	1987	1988	1989	1990	1991	1992	1993	1994	1995
Milan–San Remo	–	–	–	55	29	48	–	–	–	–	–	–
Tour of Flanders	–	–	–	49	–	5	–	–	–	–	–	–
Paris–Roubaix	–	–	37	24	67	11	–	–	–	–	–	–
Liège–Bastogne–Liège	–	–	–	24	46	34	–	–	–	–	–	–
Giro di Lombardia	–	–	–	–	3	30	–	–	–	–	–	–
Classics by highest finishing position
Classic	1984	1985	1986	1987	1988	1989	1990	1991	1992	1993	1994	1995
Omloop Het Volk	–	–	–	27	–	8	–	–	–	–	–	–
E3 Harelbeke	–	–	–	–	4	9	–	–	–	–	–	–
Gent–Wevelgem	–	–	–	11	26	13	–	–	–	–	–	–
Amstel Gold Race	–	–	33	69	38	27	–	–	–	–	–	–
La Flèche Wallonne	–	–	–	28	–	–	–	–	–	–	–	–
Clásica de San Sebastián	11	7	2	1	4	63	–	–	57	–	34	73

== National champions ==
1994
Portuguese National Road Race Championships, Orlando Sergio Rodrigues
1995
Russian National Road Race Championships, Asiat Saitov
