= Marcel Arntz =

Dutch cyclist

Personal information
- Full name: Marcellus Wilhelmus Arntz
- Born: 18 November 1965 (age 60) Lobith, Netherlands

Cycling career
- Sport: Cycling

Marcel Arntz (born 18 November 1965) is a Dutch former cyclist. He competed in the men's cross-country mountain biking event at the 1996 Summer Olympics.

He competed in road racing, cyclo-cross, and mountain biking. He was a three-time Dutch champion in mountain biking.
