= Ángel Sarrapio =

Spanish cyclist

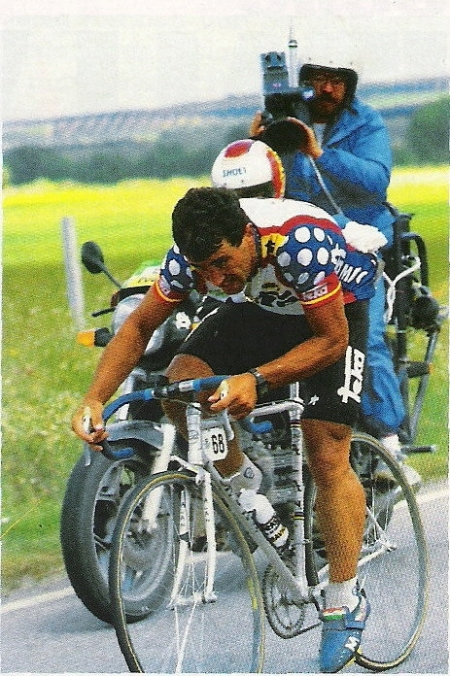

Personal information
- Full name: José Ángel Sarrapio Borboja
- Born: 21 February 1959 (age 67) Las Arenas, Spain

Cycling career
- Sport: Cycling
- Current team: Retired
- Discipline: Road
- Role: Rider

Professional teams
- 1984–1989: Teka
- 1990: Kelme
- 1991–1992: Wigarma

Major wins
- Grand Tours Tour de France 1 Individual Stage (1986) Vuelta a España 1 Individual Stage (1985)

José Ángel Sarrapio Borboja (born 21 February 1959) is a Spanish former professional road bicycle racer. In 1986 he won stage 10 of the Tour de France.

== Major results ==
1985
1st Overall Vuelta a los Valles Mineros

1st Stage 3

1st Stage 13 Vuelta a España
1st Stage 2 Troféu Joaquim Agostinho
1986
1st Stage 10 Tour de France
1987
1st Stage 1 Troféu Joaquim Agostinho
1988
1st Stage 6 Vuelta a Aragón
1989
1st GP Cuprosan

=== Grand Tour general classification results timeline ===
Grand Tour	1985	1986	1987	1988	1989	1990	1991	1992
Vuelta a España	62	99	—	—	—	94	DNF	DNF
Giro d'Italia	Did not Compete							
Tour de France	—	DNF	—	—	—	135	—	—

Legend
—	Did not compete
DNF	Did not finish
