= Panticosa =

Panticosa Pandicosa (Aragonese)
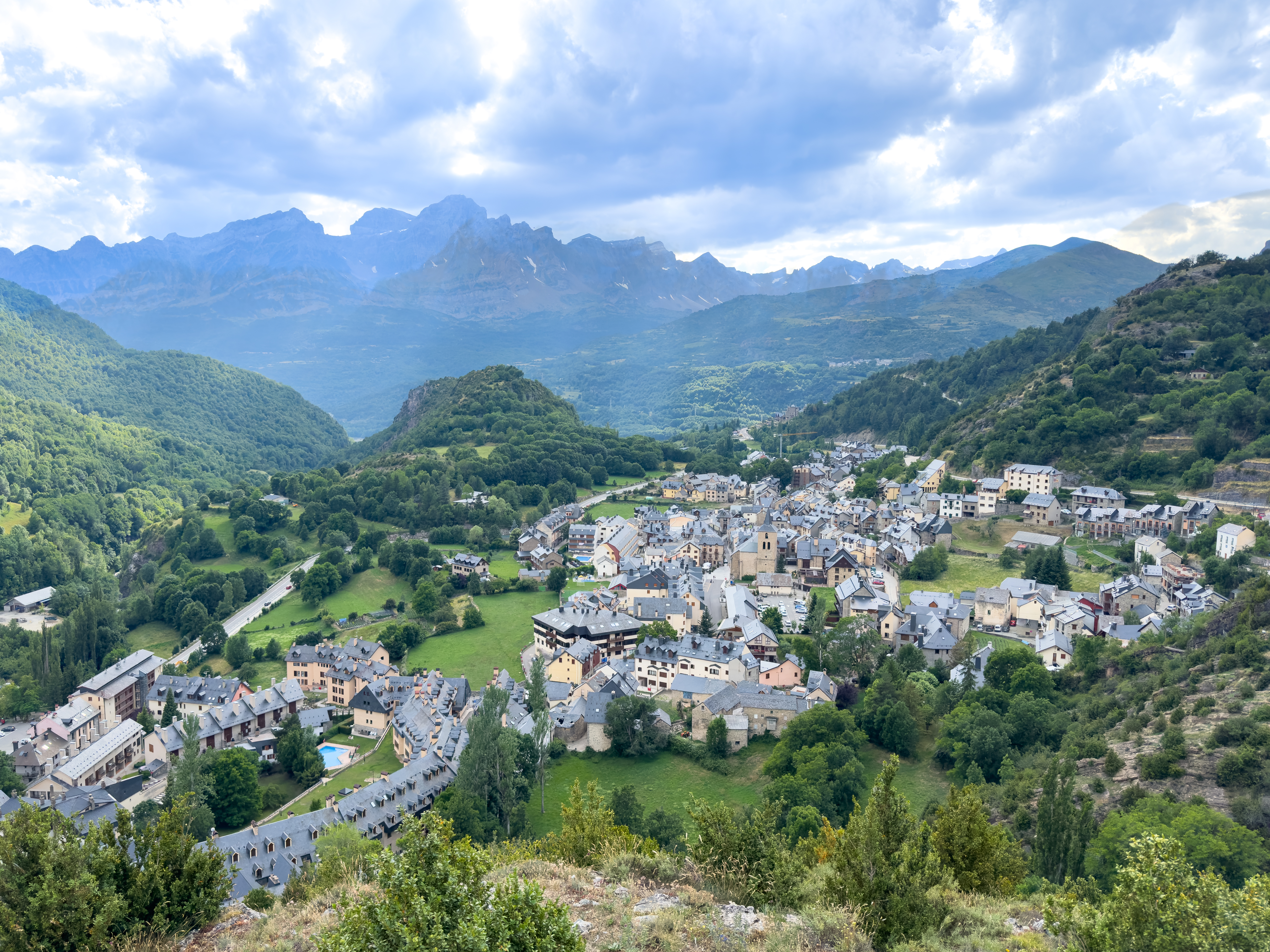

- Coat of arms

- Location of Panticosa in Spain. Panticosa (Spain)
- Coordinates: 42°43′27″N 0°17′14″E
- Country: Spain
- Autonomous community: Aragon
- Province: Huesca
- Comarca: Alto Gállego

Government
  - Mayor: José Luis Pueyo Belio

Area
  - Total: 95.9 km^{2} (37.0 sq mi)
- Elevation: 1,184 m (3,885 ft)

Population (2025-01-01)
  - Total: 910
  - Density: 9.5/km^{2} (25/sq mi)
- Time zone: UTC+1 (CET)
  - Summer (DST): UTC+2 (CEST)
- Website: Official website

Panticosa (in Aragonese: Pandicosa) is a municipality located in the province of Huesca, Aragon, Spain.

During the late 19th century and early 20th century, it was a successful spa town, famous for its pure mountain waters which supposedly cured everything from liver disease to herpes.

Its Belle Époque spa buildings are well-kept and still in use.

The first-ever FAI World Paragliding Hike and Fly Championship will take place in Panticosa from June 6 to June 13, 2027.

== See also ==
- List of municipalities in Huesca

== Gallery ==
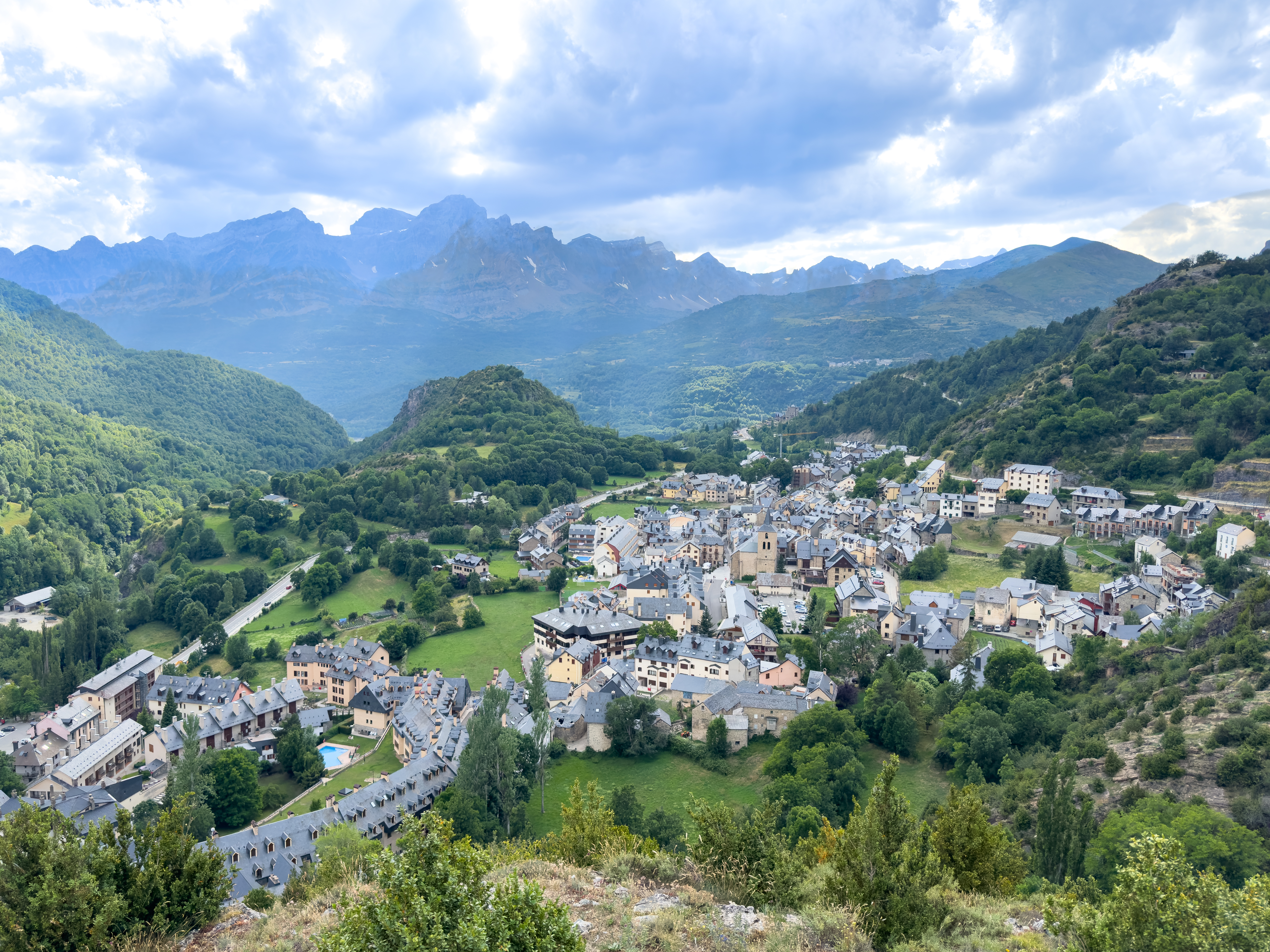

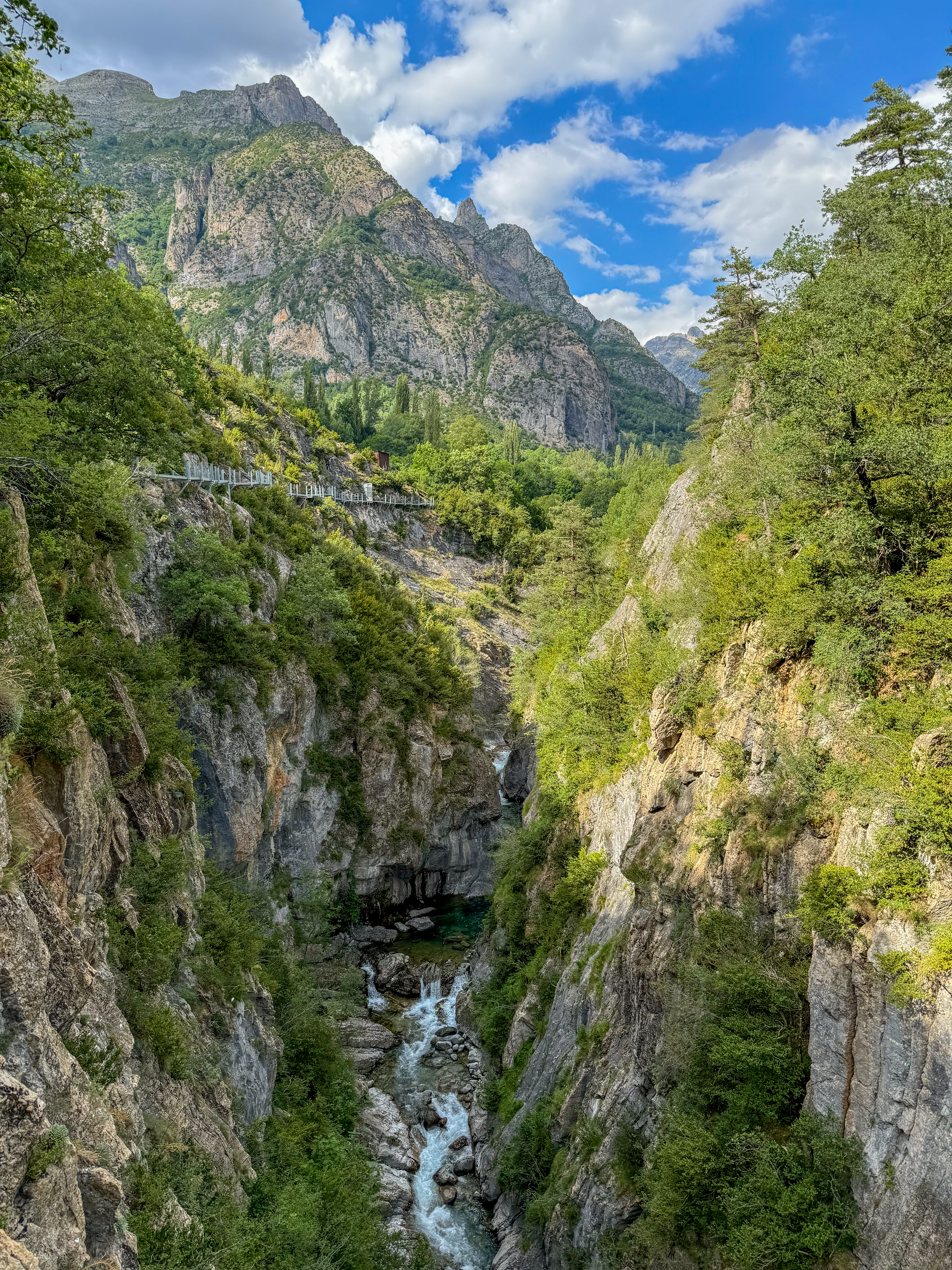

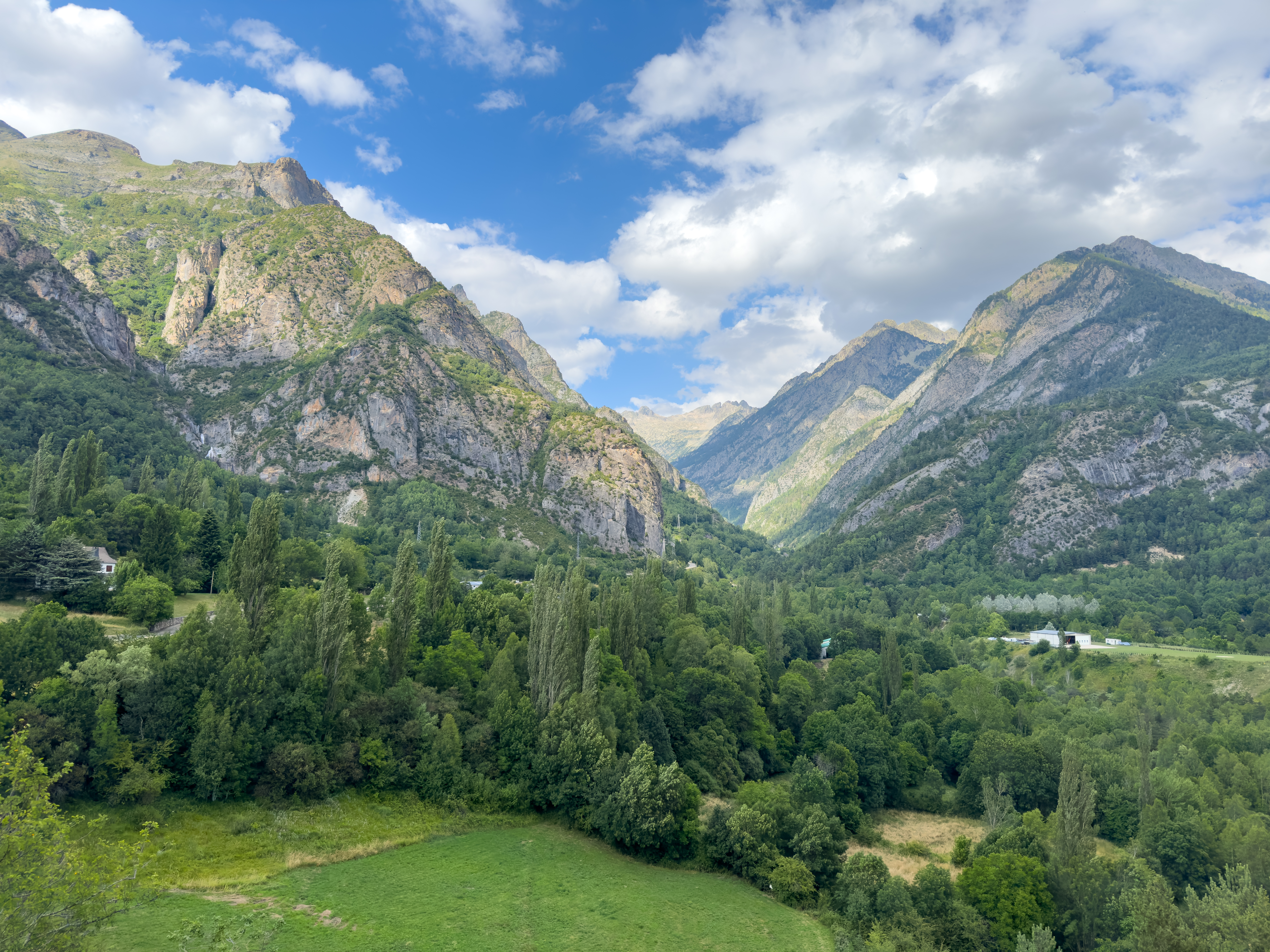

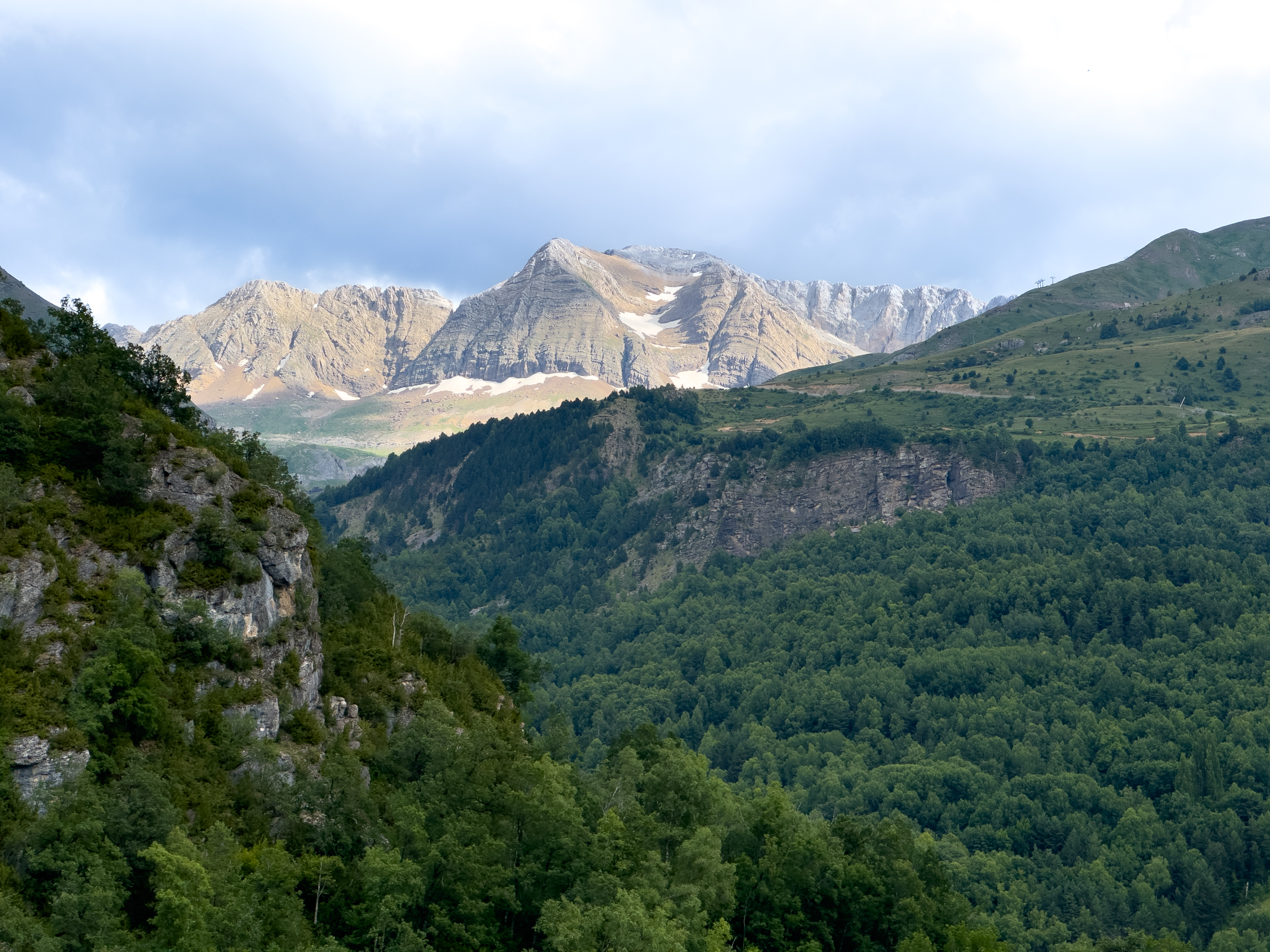
