= Pacho Rodríguez =

Colombian cyclist

Personal information
- Full name: Francisco Rodríguez Maldonado
- Born: 5 June 1960 (age 66) Duitama, Colombia

Cycling career
- Sport: Cycling
- Current team: Retired
- Discipline: Road
- Role: Rider

Professional teams
- 1984: Splendor–Mondial Moquettes–Marc
- 1985–1987: Zor–Gemeaz Cusin
- 1988: Postobón–Manzana
- 1989–1991: Pony Malta–Bavaria–Avianca

Major wins
- Grand Tours Vuelta a España 3 individual stages (1985, 1987)

Francisco "Pacho" Rodríguez Maldonado (born 5 June 1960) is a Colombian former professional racing cyclist. He rode in four editions of the Tour de France and five editions of the Vuelta a España.

== Major results ==
1981
1st Stages 7 & 8 Vuelta a Colombia
1983
1st Stage 13 Vuelta a Colombia
1st Stage 4 Clásico RCN
1984
1st Stages 3 & 5 Critérium du Dauphiné Libéré
2nd Overall Clásico RCN

1st Stages 3 & 6

2nd Overall Vuelta a Colombia

1st Stage 12

1985
1st Overall Clásico RCN

1st Stage 5

3rd Overall Vuelta a España

1st Stages 11 & 12

5th Overall Volta a Catalunya
7th Overall Vuelta a Murcia
8th Overall Setmana Catalana de Ciclisme
1987
1st Stage 21 Vuelta a España
1989
1st Overall Clásica de Cundinamarca
1990
1st Overall Vuelta a Boyacá
1st Overall Clásica de Cundinamarca
3rd Overall Vuelta a Colombia

1st Stages 8 & 13
