= José Antonio Agudelo Gómez =

Colombian cyclist

Antonio Agudelo
Personal information
- Born: 7 August 1959 (age 67) Don Matías, Colombia

Cycling career
- Sport: Cycling
- Current team: Retired
- Discipline: Road
- Role: Rider

Professional teams
- 1985: Varta–Café de Colombia–Mavic
- 1985: Varta–Renault
- 1986: Teka
- 1987–1989: Café de Colombia–Varta

Major wins
- Grand Tours Vuelta a España 1 individual stage (1985)

José Antonio Agudelo Gómez (born 7 August 1959) is a Colombian former professional racing cyclist. He rode in three editions of the Tour de France and four editions of the Vuelta a España.

== Major results ==
1981
1st Stage 5 Vuelta a Colombia
1983
1st Stage 10 Vuelta a Colombia
1984
6th Overall Clásico RCN
1985
1st Stage 7 Vuelta a España
5th Overall Tour de l'Avenir

1st Stage 7

=== Grand Tour general classification results timeline ===
Grand Tour	1984	1985	1986	1987	1988	1989
Giro d'Italia	—	—	—	—	—	—
Tour de France	19	DNF	33	—	—	—
Vuelta a España	—	DNF	DNF	—	44	92
