= José Luis Navarro (cyclist) =

Spanish cyclist

Personal information
- Born: 28 July 1962 (age 64) Madrid, Spain

Cycling career
- Sport: Cycling
- Current team: Retired
- Discipline: Road
- Role: Rider

Professional teams
- 1984–1987: Zor–Gemeaz Cusin
- 1988: Teka
- 1989–1990: Seur
- 1991: Wigarma

José Luis Navarro (born 28 July 1962) is a Spanish former professional racing cyclist. He rode in one edition of the Tour de France, one edition of the Giro d'Italia and seven editions of the Vuelta a España. He won the mountains classification of the 1985 Giro d'Italia.

== Major results ==
1982
3rd Overall Volta a Lleida
3rd Overall Vuelta a Burgos
1984
1st Klasika Primavera
1st Mémorial Manuel Galera
1985
1st Road race, National Road Championships
1st Mountains classification, Giro d'Italia
1st Stage 3 Tirreno–Adriatico
1st Stage 6 Vuelta a Asturias
1st Stage 3 Ruota d'Oro
10th Overall Vuelta a España
1986
1st Six Days of Madrid (with Gerrie Knetemann)
