= Peio Ruiz Cabestany =

Spanish cyclist (born 1962)

Pedro (Pello) Ruiz Cabestany
Personal information
- Full name: Pedro (Pello) Ruiz Cabestany
- Born: 13 March 1962 (age 64) San Sebastián, Spain

Cycling career
- Sport: Cycling
- Current team: Retired
- Discipline: Road
- Role: Rider

Professional teams
- 1984–1987: Orbea–Danena
- 1988: Kas–Canal 10
- 1989–1990: ONCE
- 1991: CLAS–Cajastur
- 1992–1993: Gatorade–Chateau d'Ax
- 1994: Euskadi–Petronor

Major wins
- Tour of the Basque Country (1985); Tour de France, 1 stage Vuelta a España, 3 stages

Pello Ruiz Cabestany (born 13 March 1962 in San Sebastián) is a Spanish former professional road racing cyclist.

== Major results ==
1980
1st Pursuit, National Track Championships
1982
1st Subida a Gorla
1st Stages 8b & 11 Vuelta a Guatemala
1st Stage 2 Vuelta a Segovia
2nd Overall Vuelta al Bidasoa
2nd Overall Cinturó de l'Empordà
1983
1st Overall Vuelta al Bidasoa
1st Prologue Grand Prix Guillaume Tell
2nd Overall Vuelta Ciclista a Navarra
2nd Overall Volta a Tarragona
2nd Subida a Gorla
1984
2nd Overall Volta a la Comunitat Valenciana

1st Stage 3

3rd Overall Vuelta a Aragón
4th Trofeo Masferrer
6th Subida a Arrate
1985
1st Overall Tour of the Basque Country
1st Stage 6 Vuelta a Colombia
2nd Road race, National Road Championships
4th Overall Vuelta a España

1st Stage 17

1986
1st Stage 4 Tour de France
2nd Overall Vuelta a Murcia
3rd Overall Grand Prix du Midi Libre

1st Stage 3

4th Subida al Naranco
6th Overall Vuelta a España
6th Overall Setmana Catalana de Ciclisme
9th Overall Tour of the Basque Country
10th Overall Volta a Catalunya

1st Stage 5b

1987
1st Overall Vuelta a Murcia

1st Stages 3 & 5

1st Gran Premio de Llodio
1st Trofeo Luis Puig
1st Stage 2 Vuelta a Castilla y León
10th Clásica de San Sebastián
1988
1st Stage 6 Tour Méditerranéen
4th Trofeo Masferrer
5th Overall Volta a Catalunya
7th Subida al Naranco
1989
1st Overall Volta a la Comunitat Valenciana

1st Stage 5b (ITT)

3rd Overall Vuelta a Burgos
5th Overall Tour de la Communauté Européenne
7th Overall Vuelta Asturias
1990
4th Overall Vuelta a España

1st Prologue & Stage 19

7th Overall Tour of the Basque Country
1991
6th Overall Vuelta a España
10th Overall Route du Sud
1992
5th Overall Vuelta a Castilla y León
1993
1st Stage 3 Euskal Bizikleta
7th Overall Tour de Romandie
1994
6th GP Villafranca de Ordizia
7th Clásica de San Sebastián

=== Grand Tour general classification results timeline ===
Grand Tour	1984	1985	1986	1987	1988	1989	1990	1991	1992	1993	1994
Vuelta a España	15	4	6	DNF	23	18	4	6	12	—	30
Giro d'Italia	—	—	—	—	—	—	—	—	—	DNF	—
Tour de France	—	54	36	DNF	—	—	12	33	72	—	—
