= José Recio =

Spanish cyclist

Personal information
- Full name: José Recio Ariza
- Born: January 24, 1957 Fernán Núñez, Spain

Cycling career
- Sport: Cycling
- Current team: Retired
- Discipline: Road
- Role: Rider

Professional teams
- 1980: Colchón CR
- 1982–1989: Kelme–Merckx
- 1990–1991: Seur

Major wins
- Grand Tours Vuelta a España 5 individual stages (1982, 1984, 1985, 1986) Stage races Volta a Catalunya (1983) Setmana Catalana de Ciclisme (1985) Vuelta a Burgos (1985)

José Recio Ariza (born January 24, 1957, in Fernán Núñez) is a Spanish former professional road racing cyclist. He won five stages of the Vuelta a España and several Spanish stage races including the Volta a Catalunya, Setmana Catalana de Ciclisme and Vuelta a Burgos.

Recio turned professional in 1980, and started in the Vuelta a Espana. This was not a success; he dropped out soon, stopped riding, and became a bricklayer for one year. In 1982, he returned as a professional rider, started the Vuelta again, and won a stage. 1983 also was good, as he won the Volta a Catalunya. In 1984, he was one of the leaders of his team in the Vuelta a Espana, and won a stage, finishing in the top ten overall.

== Major results ==
1982
1st Stage 13 Vuelta a España
1983
1st Overall Volta a Catalunya

1st Stage 6

1st Prueba Villafranca de Ordizia
1st Stage 3 Vuelta Asturias
2nd Overall Vuelta a Aragon

1st Stage 3b (ITT)

2nd GP Pascuas
1984
1st Overall Vuelta a Aragon
2nd Overall Tour of Galicia

1st Prologue

4th Overall Setmana Catalana de Ciclisme

1st Prologue

9th Overall Vuelta a España

1st Stage 17

1985
1st Overall Vuelta a Burgos

1st Prologue & Stage 2b

1st Overall Setmana Catalana de Ciclisme

1st Stage 4b (ITT)

1st Overall Vuelta a Aragon

1st Stage 4

1st Overall Vuelta a Murcia
1st Stages 14 & 18 Vuelta a España
1st Prologue & Stages 3 & 7a (ITT) Volta a Catalunya
2nd Klasika Primavera
4th Overall Tour of the Basque Country

1st Stage 2

4th Overall Tour of Galicia

1st Mountains classification

1986
1st Stage 14 Vuelta a España
1st Stage 5a Vuelta a Asturias
1st Stage 1 Vuelta a Castilla y Leon
9th Overall Volta a Catalunya
1987
5th Clásica de San Sebastián
8th Overall Volta a Catalunya
1988
1st Prologue & Stage 4b Vuelta a Aragon
2nd Overall Vuelta a Cantabria
1989
1st Stage 2 Setmana Catalana de Ciclisme
4th Overall Vuelta a Asturias
1990
1st Overall Volta ao Alentejo

1st Stages 2, 3b & 4
