= Patrick Verschueren =

Belgian cyclist

Personal information
- Born: 12 September 1962 (age 64) Mechelen, Belgium

Cycling career
- Sport: Cycling
- Role: Rider

Patrick Verschueren (born 12 September 1962) is a Belgian former racing cyclist. He rode in four editions of the Tour de France.
