= Isidro Juárez =

Spanish cyclist

Personal information
- Full name: Isidro Juárez del Moral
- Born: 2 January 1956 (age 70) Burgos, Spain

Cycling career
- Sport: Cycling
- Current team: Retired
- Discipline: Road
- Role: Rider

Professional teams
- 1977–1978: Novostil-Transmallorca-Gios
- 1979–1980: Colchón CR-Atún TAM
- 1981–1982: Zor–Helios–Novostil
- 1983–1985: Hueso Chocolates
- 1986: Zahor Chocolates

Major wins
- Grand Tours Vuelta a España 1 individual stage (1985)

Isidro Juárez del Moral (born 2 January 1956) is a Spanish former professional racing cyclist. He rode in one edition of the Giro d'Italia and ten editions of the Vuelta a España. He notably won stage 16 of the 1985 Vuelta a España and the 1981 Vuelta a La Rioja.

At the 1979 Spanish National Road Race Championships, Juárez initially won but was disqualified after a positive doping test. The title was awarded to second-place finisher Faustino Rupérez.

== Major results ==
1979
1st Stage 5 Tour of the Basque Country
1st Stage 4a Vuelta a Cantabria
1980
2nd Overall Vuelta a Aragón

1st Stage 6

1981
1st Overall Vuelta a La Rioja

1st Stage 3

7th Overall Vuelta a Burgos
1982
1st Stage 2 Vuelta a Burgos
1984
1st Stage 5 Vuelta a Asturias
10th Overall Vuelta a Aragón
10th Overall Herald Sun Tour
1985
1st Stage 16 Vuelta a España

=== Grand Tour general classification results timeline ===
Grand Tour	1977	1978	1979	1980	1981	1982	1983	1984	1985	1986
Giro d'Italia	—	—	—	—	—	56	—	—	—	—
Tour de France	—	—	—	—	—	—	—	—	—	—
Vuelta a España	49	DNF	49	48	DNF	42	39	55	63	66

Legend
—	Did not compete
DNF	Did not finish
