= Pedro Delgado =

Spanish cyclist (born 1960)

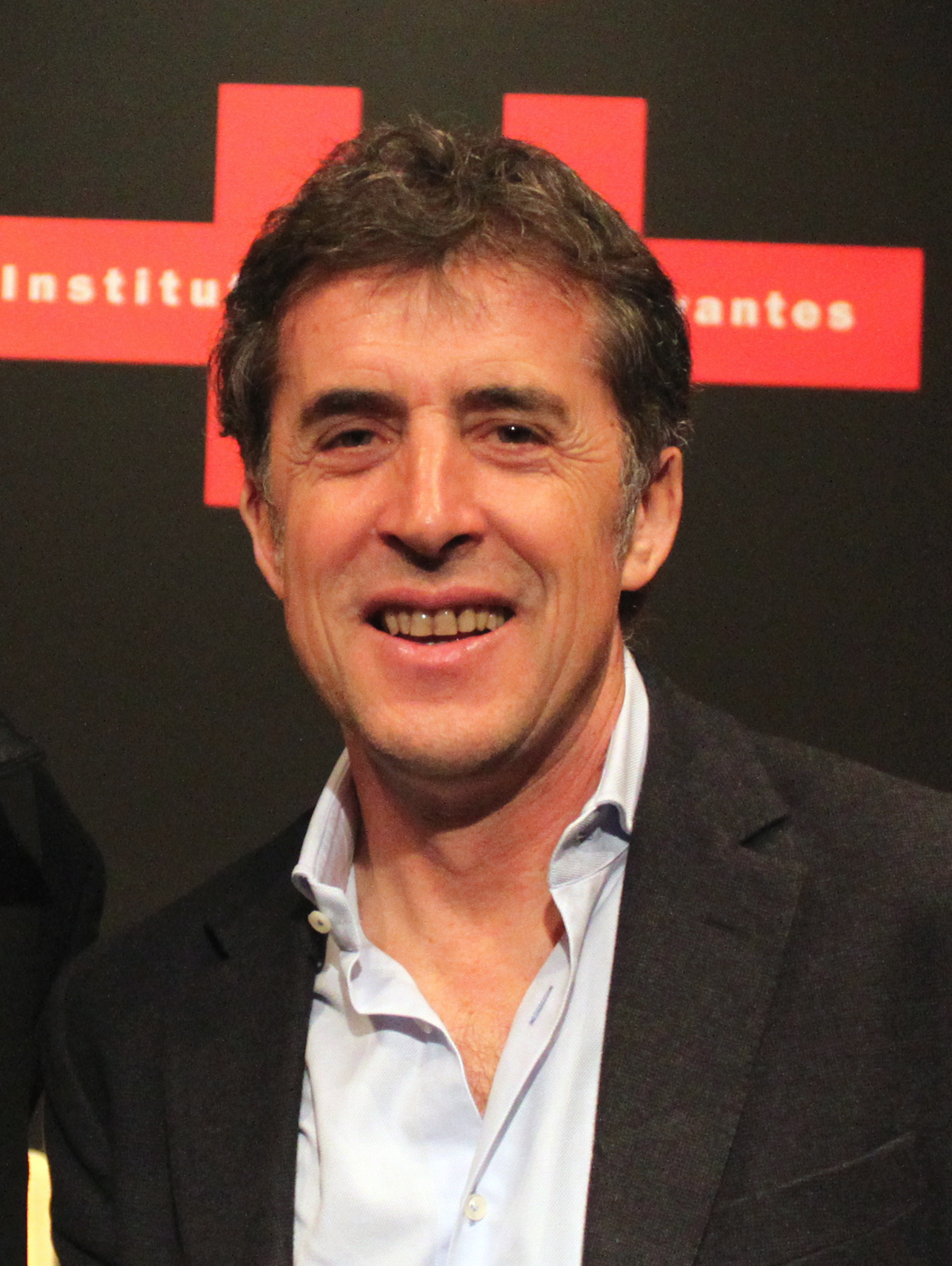
- Delgado in 2016

Personal information
- Full name: Pedro Delgado Robledo
- Nickname: Perico
- Born: 15 April 1960 (age 66) Segovia, Castile and León, Spain
- Height: 1.71 m (5 ft 7 1/2 in)
- Weight: 64 kg (141 lb; 10 st 1 lb)

Cycling career
- Sport: Cycling
- Discipline: Road
- Role: Rider
- Rider type: Climbing specialist

Professional teams
- 1982–1984: Reynolds
- 1985: Orbea–Gin MG
- 1986–1987: PDM–Ultima–Concorde
- 1988–1994: Reynolds

Major wins
- Grand Tours Tour de France General classification (1988) 4 individual stages (1985, 1986, 1987, 1988) Vuelta a España General classification (1985, 1989) 5 individual stages (1985, 1989, 1992) Stage races Vuelta a Burgos (1991)

Pedro Delgado Robledo (pronounced [ˈpeðɾo ðelˈɣaðo roˈβleðo]; born 15 April 1960), also known as Perico ([peˈɾiko]), is a Spanish former professional road bicycle racer. He won the 1988 Tour de France, as well as the Vuelta a España in 1985 and 1989. He finished in the top 10 of eighteen Grand Tours.

Delgado tested positive for the known masking agent Probenecid during the 1988 tour. The drug, which had been placed on the International Olympic Committee's list of banned substances in January of that year, had not yet been banned by the sport's governing body, the Union Cycliste Internationale; as a consequence, Delgado was allowed to continue racing and was not charged with any doping offence.

Since 1995, he works as a sports commentator for Televisión Española during important cycling events, first along with journalist Pedro González, and, after his death in January 2000, with Carlos de Andrés.

== Tour de France record ==
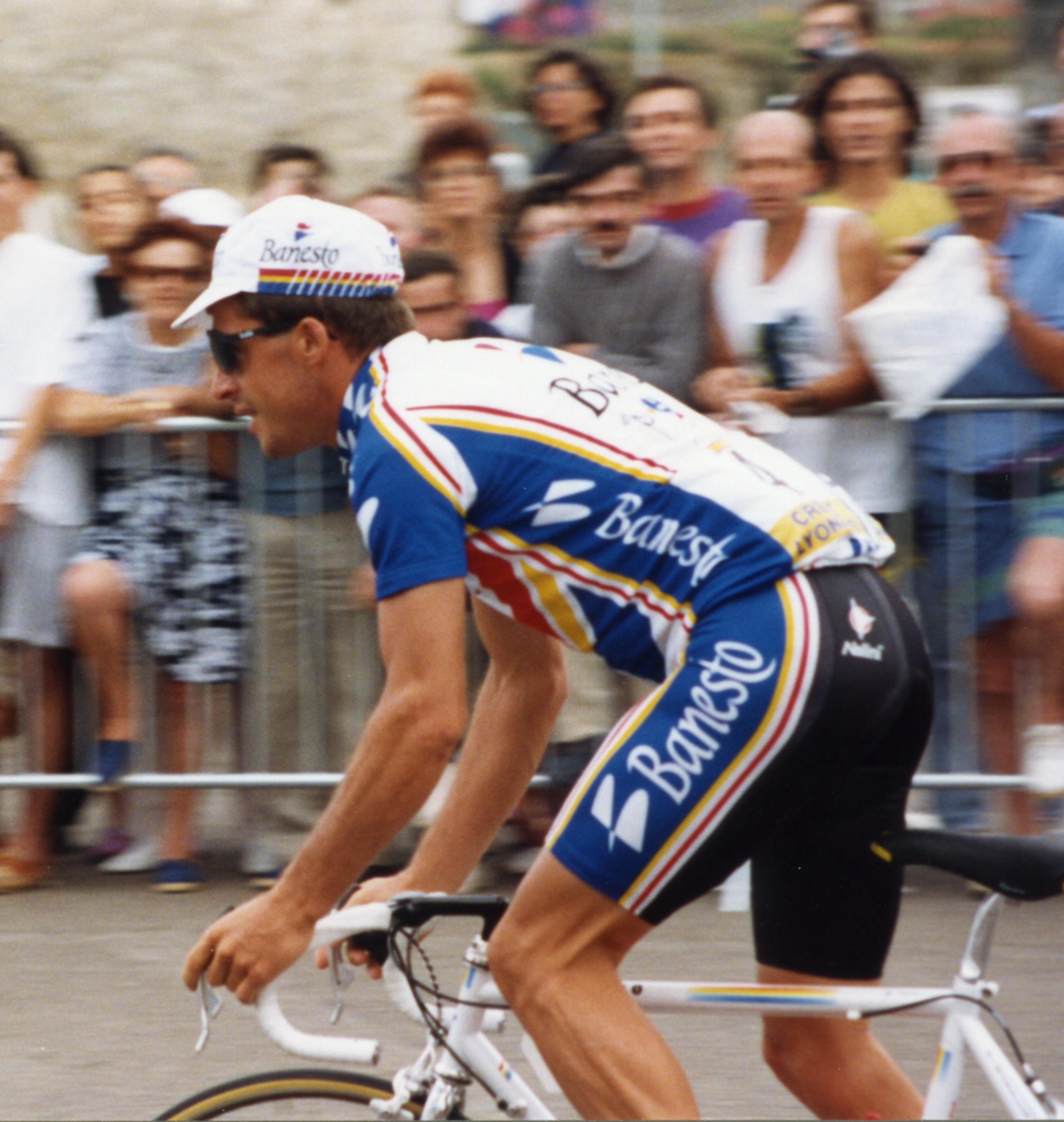
Delgado at the 1993 Tour de France

Delgado took part in the Tour de France eleven times. During his first participation, when he was 23, he rose to second place in the overall classification after the 17th stage, before falling back later in the event.

In 1983, the Reynolds team participated in the Tour for the first time. Delgado was a young rider, and Ángel Arroyo was the star of the team. That year the Tour had four individual time trials (ITT), plus the prologue, and six mountainous stages. After the 17th stage Delgado was second in the overall classification, 1m08s behind Laurent Fignon, another 23-year-old rider competing in the Tour for the first time. However, Delgado drank a spoilt milk shake that caused him a stomach cramp during the next stage, ending in Morzine. He lost 25 minutes 34 seconds that day, and his first chance of winning the Tour. He finished in 15th position, 25 minutes 44 seconds behind Fignon.

=== 1987 Tour de France ===
Delgado fought a long battle with Stephen Roche during the 1987 Tour de France, that was resolved in favour of Roche only in the penultimate stage, an ITT. The final difference was 40 seconds, at the time the second smallest difference ever recorded. Delgado was regarded as the third best time-trialist that year, with Roche considered the best. Roche later said:

"We were on French TV after the descent into Morzine [the last mountain stage, after which Delgado was still leader of the overall classification] and, off camera, he came up to me, hugged me, and said 'Bravo, you deserve the yellow jersey'. The TV people couldn't believe it! He's a fabulous competitor, but he's also a great, incredibly gallant guy and I think that's another reason why that Tour was so special."

=== 1988 Tour de France ===
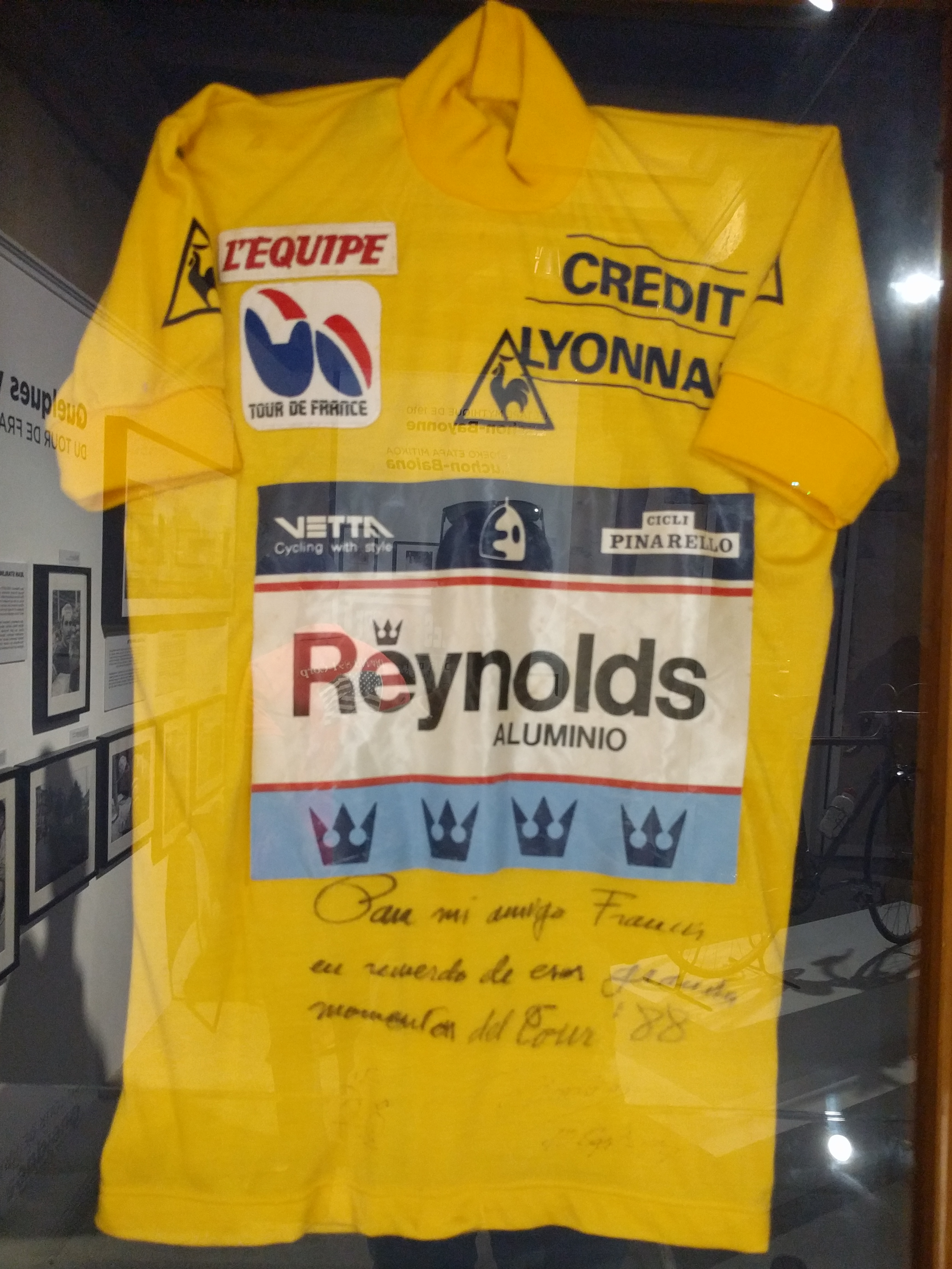
Delgado's yellow jersey of the 1988 Tour de France

Delgado won the 1988 Tour de France by a comfortable margin. The evening after the 17th stage, the television channel "Antenne2" reported that Delgado had tested positive in a doping test. His team director José Miguel Echevarri was informed hours after by the Tour organization without mention of the substance. That night, Xavier Louy, director of the race, went to the hotel where Echavarri was and suggested to him that Delgado should withdraw. This was similar to the "Merckx affaire" in the 1969 Giro.

The following morning Echevarri received the official communication. The substance was probenecid, a medicine for the kidney and also a masking agent for anabolic steroids. In 1988, every sport had a different list of banned substances and the International Olympic Committee (IOC) had its own, although there was a commitment to unify the lists in 1990. Probenecid was in the IOC list, but not in the Union Cycliste Internationale (UCI) list (it would be one month later) and rule number 35 of the 1988 Tour regulations stated that the doping test would be carried out in accordance with the UCI rules. The technical jury declared that Delgado had not broken any UCI rule.

However, the Director of the Tour de France, Jean-Pierre Courcol, said "I now know that the letter can replace the spirit of the law and that the regulations can be played with, in order to give the appearance of utter innocence. Today, I am ashamed" and his deputy, Jean-Marie Leblanc, described it as a "dismal verdict". Other riders were also unhappy, with Andy Hampsten saying "Delgado took a drug to mask steroids. It's not on the banned list but it's a masking drug and that's what the commissaries should have acknowledged. I think it's a crime to let him wear the yellow jersey, a crime against the public and against the sport."

In 1988 the sanction for this type of doping was a penalty of 10 minutes, which was applied to Gert-Jan Theunisse during the same 1988 Tour de France; Delgado, having been cleared, received no such penalty. His final advantage over the second rider in the overall classification, Steven Rooks, was 7:13 minutes. Third, 9:58 behind, was Fabio Parra.

Delgado wore the yellow jersey for eleven days, and passed doping tests every day. There was no trace of probenecid nor steroids in any other test. He thanked the public for their support and claimed he would always be grateful for the support he received during the competition.

Xavier Louy was replaced as Tour director months later.

=== 1989 Tour de France ===
At the 1989 Tour de France, Delgado arrived 2m 40s late for the prologue. He covered the distance only 14 seconds slower than Erik Breukink, the stage winner, but nevertheless became the first defending champion to begin the race in last place, 2:54 behind Breukink. He later said that he was very nervous and had not slept the previous night. The following day there were two stages. Due to this he was very weak and suffered hypoglycemia in the second stage, a decisive team time-trial. That day he would have been dropped by his team had they not waited, and he lost more time than in the previous stage, 4:32. After that second stage, he remained last in the overall classification, more than seven minutes behind the best-classified of the favourites, Laurent Fignon.

Delgado rode the rest of the race on the offensive. His reaction started in the 5th stage, a 73 km individual time-trial. He was second in the stage, 24 seconds behind Greg LeMond. In the first mountain stage, Delgado attacked during the last climb, gaining 29", but in the next stage Delgado, together with Robert Millar, finished 3:26 ahead of Fignon and 3:38 ahead of LeMond. Delgado was now 4th overall, 2:53 behind the leader, Fignon. After the 17th stage, finishing in Alpe d´Huez, final victory still seemed possible, Delgado was third overall, 1:55 behind Fignon and 1:29 behind LeMond, but he was unable to make up all the time he had lost in the early stages, and the final fight of that Tour had only two major figures: Laurent Fignon and the final winner, Greg LeMond.

== Major results ==
1979
1st Stage 11 Tour de l'Avenir
1980
1st Stage 8 Giro Ciclistico d'Italia
1st Stage 5 GP Tell
1981
1st Overall Vuelta a Murcia
1982
1st Clásica de Sabiñánigo
1st Stage 4a Vuelta a Cantabria
3rd Clásica de San Sebastián
1983
1st Overall Vuelta a Aragón

1st Stage 3

1st Stage 3a Vuelta a los Valles Mineros
2nd Subida al Naranco
4th Clásica de San Sebastián
5th Overall Volta a Catalunya
1984
4th Overall Vuelta a España

Held after stages 7–11

9th Overall Vuelta Ciclista al Pais Vasco
9th Overall Vuelta a Aragón
1985
1st Overall Vuelta a España

1st Stage 6

3rd Overall Vuelta a Murcia
5th Overall Vuelta Ciclista al Pais Vasco
6th Overall Tour de France

1st Stage 17

9th Overall Volta a Catalunya
1986
1st Stage 12 Tour de France
2nd Subida al Naranco
3rd Overall Escalada a Montjuïc
6th Overall Tour de Suisse
7th Overall Volta a Catalunya
8th Overall Setmana Catalana de Ciclisme
10th Overall Vuelta a España
1987
2nd Overall Tour de France

1st Stage 19
Held after stages 20–23

4th Overall Vuelta a España
7th Overall Volta a Catalunya
1988
1st Overall Tour de France

1st Stage 13 (ITT)

1st GP Miguel Induráin
4th Overall Setmana Catalana de Ciclisme
5th Trophée des Grimpeurs
6th Overall Vuelta Ciclista al Pais Vasco
6th Overall Tour de Romandie
7th Overall Giro d'Italia
8th La Flèche Wallonne
1989
1st Overall Vuelta a España

1st Stages 12, 15 (ITT) & 20 (ITT)

2nd Overall Setmana Catalana de Ciclisme
2nd Overall Volta a Catalunya
3rd Overall Tour de France
3rd Overall Escalada a Montjuïc
3rd La Poly Normande
4th Liège–Bastogne–Liège
1990
1st Stage 2 Setmana Catalana de Ciclisme
1st GP Miguel Induráin
2nd Overall Vuelta a España
3rd Overall Volta a Catalunya
4th Overall Tour de France
4th Subida al Naranco
1991
1st Overall Vuelta a Burgos

1st Mountains classification
1st Stage 4

1st Subida a Urkiola
1st Clásica a los Puertos
2nd Overall Volta a Catalunya
2nd Clásica de San Sebastián
9th Overall Tour de France
10th Overall Tour de Romandie
1992
2nd Subida a Urkiola
3rd Overall Vuelta a España

1st Stage 14

5th La Flèche Wallonne
6th Overall Tour de France
8th Overall Setmana Catalana de Ciclisme
10th Overall Volta a Catalunya
1993
1st Overall Setmana Catalana de Ciclisme
2nd Klasika Primavera
3rd Overall Vuelta Asturias
6th Overall Vuelta a España
9th Overall Tour de France
1994
2nd Overall Vuelta Asturias
2nd Subida al Naranco
3rd Overall Vuelta a España
3rd Overall Volta a Catalunya
5th Overall Escalada a Montjuïc
7th Overall Vuelta a Murcia

=== Grand Tour general classification results timeline ===
Grand Tour	1982	1983	1984	1985	1986	1987	1988	1989	1990	1991	1992	1993	1994
Vuelta a España	29	15	4	1	10	4	DNF	1	2	DNF	3	6	3
Giro d'Italia	—	—	—	—	DNF	—	7	—	—	15	—	—	—
Tour de France	—	15	DNF	6	DNF	2	1	3	4	9	6	9	—

Legend
—	Did not compete
DNF	Did not finish
