= 1992 Vuelta a España, Stage 1 to Stage 10 =

Cycling race stages

The 1992 Vuelta a España was the 47th edition of the Vuelta a España, one of cycling's Grand Tours. The Vuelta began in Jerez de la Frontera, with an individual time trial on 27 April, and Stage 10 occurred on 6 May with a stage to Sabiñánigo. The race finished in Madrid on 17 May.

== Stage 1 ==
27 April 1992 — Jerez de la Frontera to Jerez de la Frontera, 9.2 km (5.7 mi) (ITT)

Stage 1 result and general classification after Stage 1

Rank	Rider	Team	Time
1	Jelle Nijdam (NED)	Buckler–Colnago–Decca	11' 13"
2	Melcior Mauri (ESP)	ONCE	+ 9"
3	Raúl Alcalá (MEX)	PDM–Ultima–Concorde	+ 11"
4	Alex Zülle (SUI)	ONCE	+ 14"
5	Artūras Kasputis (LTU)	Postobón–Manzana–Ryalcao	+ 21"
6	Stephen Roche (IRL)	Carrera Jeans–Vagabond	+ 22"
7	Thomas Wegmüller (SUI)	Lotus–Festina	s.t.
8	Tony Rominger (SUI)	CLAS–Cajastur	s.t.
9	Fabio Parra (COL)	Amaya Seguros	s.t.
10	Juan Martínez Oliver (ESP)	Kelme–Don Cafe	s.t.

== Stage 2a ==
28 April 1992 — San Fernando to Jerez de la Frontera, 135.5 km (84.2 mi)

Stage 2a result

Rank	Rider	Team	Time
1	Djamolidine Abdoujaparov (UZB)	Carrera Jeans–Vagabond	3h 42' 28"
2	Jelle Nijdam (NED)	Buckler–Colnago–Decca	s.t.
3	Nico Verhoeven (NED)	PDM–Ultima–Concorde	s.t.
4	Uwe Raab (GER)	PDM–Ultima–Concorde	s.t.
5	Fabio Baldato (ITA)	GB–MG Maglificio	s.t.
6	Alfonso Gutiérrez (ESP)	Artiach–Royal	s.t.
7	Manuel Jorge Domínguez (ESP)	CLAS–Cajastur	s.t.
8	Casimiro Moreda (ESP)	Puertas Mavisa	s.t.
9	Jesper Skibby (DEN)	TVM–Sanyo	s.t.
10	Mathieu Hermans (NED)	Lotus–Festina	s.t.

General classification after Stage 2a

Rank	Rider	Team	Time
1	Jelle Nijdam (NED)	Buckler–Colnago–Decca	
2	Melcior Mauri (ESP)	ONCE	+ 17"
3	Raúl Alcalá (MEX)	PDM–Ultima–Concorde	+ 19"

== Stage 2b ==
28 April 1992 — Arcos de la Frontera to Jerez de la Frontera, 32.6 km (20.3 mi) (TTT)

Stage 2b result

Rank	Team	Time
1	Gatorade–Chateau d'Ax	37' 51"
2	Carrera Jeans–Vagabond	+ 34"
3	CLAS–Cajastur	+ 35"
4	ONCE	+ 37"
5	Banesto	+ 43"
6	Amaya Seguros	+ 44"
7	TVM–Sanyo	+ 1' 02"
8	PDM–Ultima–Concorde	+ 1' 05"
9	Seur	+ 1' 14"
10	Kelme–Don Cafe	+ 1' 18"

General classification after Stage 2b

Rank	Rider	Team	Time
1	Pello Ruiz Cabestany (ESP)	Gatorade–Chateau d'Ax	
2	Andrea Chiurato (ITA)	Gatorade–Chateau d'Ax	+ 3"
3	Marco Giovannetti (ITA)	Gatorade–Chateau d'Ax	+ 15"
4	Mario Scirea (ITA)	Gatorade–Chateau d'Ax	+ 16"
5	Melcior Mauri (ESP)	ONCE	+ 21"
6	Alex Zülle (SUI)	ONCE	+ 26"
7	Tony Rominger (SUI)	CLAS–Cajastur	s.t.
8	Rudy Verdonck (BEL)	Gatorade–Chateau d'Ax	+ 32"
9	Stefano Zanatta (ITA)	Gatorade–Chateau d'Ax	+ 36"
10	Fabio Parra (COL)	Amaya Seguros	+ 41"

== Stage 3 ==
29 April 1992 — Jerez de la Frontera to Córdoba, 205 km (127 mi)

Stage 3 result

Rank	Rider	Team	Time
1	Jean-Paul van Poppel (NED)	PDM–Ultima–Concorde	6h 12' 20"
2	Djamolidine Abdoujaparov (UZB)	Carrera Jeans–Vagabond	s.t.
3	Jelle Nijdam (NED)	Buckler–Colnago–Decca	s.t.
4	Roberto Pagnin (ITA)	Lotus–Festina	s.t.
5	Juan Carlos González Salvador (ESP)	Puertas Mavisa	s.t.
6	Manuel Jorge Domínguez (ESP)	CLAS–Cajastur	s.t.
7	Dimitri Konyshev (RUS)	TVM–Sanyo	s.t.
8	Nico Verhoeven (NED)	PDM–Ultima–Concorde	s.t.
9	Alex Zülle (SUI)	ONCE	s.t.
10	Silvio Martinello (ITA)	Mercatone Uno–Medeghini–Zucchini	s.t.

General classification after Stage 3

Rank	Rider	Team	Time
1	Pello Ruiz Cabestany (ESP)	Gatorade–Chateau d'Ax	10h 44' 17"
2	Andrea Chiurato (ITA)	Gatorade–Chateau d'Ax	+ 3"
3	Marco Giovannetti (ITA)	Gatorade–Chateau d'Ax	+ 15"
4	Mario Scirea (ITA)	Gatorade–Chateau d'Ax	+ 16"
5	Melcior Mauri (ESP)	ONCE	+ 21"
6	Alex Zülle (SUI)	ONCE	+ 26"
7	Tony Rominger (SUI)	CLAS–Cajastur	s.t.
8	Rudy Verdonck (BEL)	Gatorade–Chateau d'Ax	+ 32"
9	Stefano Zanatta (ITA)	Gatorade–Chateau d'Ax	+ 36"
10	Fabio Parra (COL)	Amaya Seguros	+ 41"

== Stage 4 ==
30 April 1992 — Linares to Albacete, 229 km (142 mi)

Stage 4 result

Rank	Rider	Team	Time
1	Djamolidine Abdoujaparov (UZB)	Carrera Jeans–Vagabond	6h 04' 06"
2	Fabio Baldato (ITA)	GB–MG Maglificio	s.t.
3	Mathieu Hermans (NED)	Lotus–Festina	s.t.
4	Dimitri Konyshev (RUS)	TVM–Sanyo	s.t.
5	Casimiro Moreda (ESP)	Puertas Mavisa	s.t.
6	Jelle Nijdam (NED)	Buckler–Colnago–Decca	s.t.
7	Jean-Pierre Heynderickx (BEL)	Collstrop	s.t.
8	Guido Bontempi (ITA)	Carrera Jeans–Vagabond	s.t.
9	Stefano Zanatta (ITA)	Gatorade–Chateau d'Ax	s.t.
10	José Luis Rodriguez (ESP)	Seur	s.t.

General classification after Stage 4

Rank	Rider	Team	Time
1	Pello Ruiz Cabestany (ESP)	Gatorade–Chateau d'Ax	16h 48' 23"
2	Melcior Mauri (ESP)	ONCE	+ 21"
3	Stefano Zanatta (ITA)	Gatorade–Chateau d'Ax	+ 36"
4	Marco Giovannetti (ITA)	Gatorade–Chateau d'Ax	+ 44"
5	Jelle Nijdam (NED)	Buckler–Colnago–Decca	+ 45"
6	Mario Scirea (ITA)	Gatorade–Chateau d'Ax	s.t.
7	Johan Bruyneel (BEL)	ONCE	+ 49"
8	Joan Llaneras (ESP)	ONCE	s.t.
9	Anselmo Fuerte (ESP)	ONCE	+ 50"
10	Raúl Alcalá (MEX)	PDM–Ultima–Concorde	+ 51"

== Stage 5 ==
1 May 1992 — Albacete to Gandia, 213.5 km (132.7 mi)

Stage 5 result

Rank	Rider	Team	Time
1	Jean-Paul van Poppel (NED)	PDM–Ultima–Concorde	5h 22' 38"
2	Djamolidine Abdoujaparov (UZB)	Carrera Jeans–Vagabond	s.t.
3	Oleg Petrovich Chuzhda (UKR)	Seur	s.t.
4	Jelle Nijdam (NED)	Buckler–Colnago–Decca	s.t.
5	Jean-Pierre Heynderickx (BEL)	Collstrop	s.t.
6	Asiat Saitov (RUS)	Kelme–Don Cafe	s.t.
7	Jesper Skibby (DEN)	TVM–Sanyo	s.t.
8	Uwe Raab (GER)	PDM–Ultima–Concorde	s.t.
9	Dimitri Konyshev (RUS)	TVM–Sanyo	s.t.
10	Fabio Baldato (ITA)	GB–MG Maglificio	s.t.

General classification after Stage 5

Rank	Rider	Team	Time
1	Pello Ruiz Cabestany (ESP)	Gatorade–Chateau d'Ax	22h 10' 57"
2	Melcior Mauri (ESP)	ONCE	+ 25"
3	Stefano Zanatta (ITA)	Gatorade–Chateau d'Ax	+ 40"
4	Marco Giovannetti (ITA)	Gatorade–Chateau d'Ax	+ 48"
5	Jelle Nijdam (NED)	Buckler–Colnago–Decca	+ 49"
6	Mario Scirea (ITA)	Gatorade–Chateau d'Ax	s.t.
7	Johan Bruyneel (BEL)	ONCE	+ 53"
8	Joan Llaneras (ESP)	ONCE	s.t.
9	Anselmo Fuerte (ESP)	ONCE	+ 54"
10	Raúl Alcalá (MEX)	PDM–Ultima–Concorde	+ 55"

== Stage 6 ==
2 May 1992 — Gandia to Benicàssim, 202.8 km (126.0 mi)

Stage 6 result

Rank	Rider	Team	Time
1	Edwig Van Hooydonck (BEL)	Buckler–Colnago–Decca	5h 02' 28"
2	Alex Zülle (SUI)	ONCE	+ 1' 51"
3	Juan Carlos González Salvador (ESP)	Puertas Mavisa	s.t.
4	Herminio Díaz Zabala (ESP)	ONCE	s.t.
5	Iñaki Gastón (ESP)	CLAS–Cajastur	s.t.
6	Nico Verhoeven (NED)	PDM–Ultima–Concorde	s.t.
7	Dimitri Konyshev (RUS)	TVM–Sanyo	s.t.
8	Uwe Raab (GER)	PDM–Ultima–Concorde	s.t.
9	Joachim Halupczok (POL)	GB–MG Maglificio	s.t.
10	Harald Maier (AUT)	PDM–Ultima–Concorde	s.t.

General classification after Stage 6

Rank	Rider	Team	Time
1	Pello Ruiz Cabestany (ESP)	Gatorade–Chateau d'Ax	27h 15' 16"
2	Melcior Mauri (ESP)	ONCE	+ 25"
3	Alex Zülle (SUI)	ONCE	+ 47"
4	Marco Giovannetti (ITA)	Gatorade–Chateau d'Ax	+ 48"
5	Johan Bruyneel (BEL)	ONCE	+ 53"
6	Joan Llaneras (ESP)	ONCE	s.t.
7	Anselmo Fuerte (ESP)	ONCE	+ 54"
8	Raúl Alcalá (MEX)	PDM–Ultima–Concorde	+ 55"
9	Stephen Roche (IRL)	Carrera Jeans–Vagabond	+ 56"
10	Laudelino Cubino (ESP)	Amaya Seguros	s.t.

== Stage 7 ==
3 May 1992 — Alquerías del Niño Perdido to Oropesa, 49.5 km (30.8 mi) (ITT)

Stage 7 result

Rank	Rider	Team	Time
1	Erik Breukink (NED)	PDM–Ultima–Concorde	1h 10' 50"
2	Jesús Montoya (ESP)	Amaya Seguros	+ 9"
3	Eric Vanderaerden (BEL)	Buckler–Colnago–Decca	+ 46"
4	Johan Bruyneel (BEL)	ONCE	+ 51"
5	Melcior Mauri (ESP)	ONCE	s.t.
6	Raúl Alcalá (MEX)	PDM–Ultima–Concorde	+ 1' 13"
7	Federico Echave (ESP)	CLAS–Cajastur	+ 1' 22"
8	Pedro Delgado (ESP)	Banesto	+ 1' 30"
9	Thomas Wegmüller (SUI)	Lotus–Festina	+ 1' 33"
10	Alex Zülle (SUI)	ONCE	+ 1' 53"

General classification after Stage 7

Rank	Rider	Team	Time
1	Jesús Montoya (ESP)	Amaya Seguros	28h 27' 17"
2	Melcior Mauri (ESP)	ONCE	+ 5"
3	Johan Bruyneel (BEL)	ONCE	+ 33"
4	Raúl Alcalá (MEX)	PDM–Ultima–Concorde	+ 57"
5	Alex Zülle (SUI)	ONCE	+ 1' 29"
6	Federico Echave (ESP)	CLAS–Cajastur	+ 1' 33"
7	Pedro Delgado (ESP)	Banesto	+ 1' 41"
8	Pello Ruiz Cabestany (ESP)	Gatorade–Chateau d'Ax	+ 1' 50"
9	Stephen Hodge (AUS)	ONCE	+ 1' 54"
10	Stephen Roche (IRL)	Carrera Jeans–Vagabond	+ 2' 11"

== Stage 8 ==
4 May 1992 — Lleida to Pla de Beret, 240.5 km (149.4 mi)

Stage 8 result

Rank	Rider	Team	Time
1	Jon Unzaga (ESP)	CLAS–Cajastur	7h 19' 42"
2	José Martín Farfán (COL)	Kelme–Don Cafe	s.t.
3	Alex Zülle (SUI)	ONCE	+ 11"
4	Johan Bruyneel (BEL)	ONCE	s.t.
5	Laudelino Cubino (ESP)	Amaya Seguros	s.t.
6	Tony Rominger (SUI)	CLAS–Cajastur	s.t.
7	Carlos Hernández Bailo (ESP)	Lotus–Festina	s.t.
8	Pedro Delgado (ESP)	Banesto	s.t.
9	Fabio Parra (COL)	Amaya Seguros	s.t.
10	Marco Giovannetti (ITA)	Gatorade–Chateau d'Ax	s.t.

General classification after Stage 8

Rank	Rider	Team	Time
1	Jesús Montoya (ESP)	Amaya Seguros	35h 47' 38"
2	Johan Bruyneel (BEL)	ONCE	+ 5"
3	Raúl Alcalá (MEX)	PDM–Ultima–Concorde	+ 29"
4	Alex Zülle (SUI)	ONCE	+ 1' 01"
5	Pedro Delgado (ESP)	Banesto	+ 1' 13"
6	Federico Echave (ESP)	CLAS–Cajastur	+ 1' 22"
7	Stephen Roche (IRL)	Carrera Jeans–Vagabond	+ 1' 43"
8	Pello Ruiz Cabestany (ESP)	Gatorade–Chateau d'Ax	+ 1' 50"
9	Tony Rominger (SUI)	CLAS–Cajastur	+ 2' 10"
10	Marco Giovannetti (ITA)	Gatorade–Chateau d'Ax	+ 2' 15"

== Stage 9 ==
5 May 1992 — Vielha to Luz Ardiden, 144 km (89 mi)

Stage 9 result

Rank	Rider	Team	Time
1	Laudelino Cubino (ESP)	Amaya Seguros	4h 52' 36"
2	Tony Rominger (SUI)	CLAS–Cajastur	+ 19"
3	Jesús Montoya (ESP)	Amaya Seguros	+ 1' 22"
4	Federico Echave (ESP)	CLAS–Cajastur	+ 1' 41"
5	Fabio Parra (COL)	Amaya Seguros	+ 1' 43"
6	Marco Giovannetti (ITA)	Gatorade–Chateau d'Ax	s.t.
7	Pedro Delgado (ESP)	Banesto	s.t.
8	Robert Millar (GBR)	TVM–Sanyo	+ 5' 07"
9	Francisco Javier Mauleón (ESP)	CLAS–Cajastur	+ 6' 21"
10	Iñaki Gastón (ESP)	CLAS–Cajastur	+ 6' 23"

General classification after Stage 9

Rank	Rider	Team	Time
1	Jesús Montoya (ESP)	Amaya Seguros	40h 41' 36"
2	Tony Rominger (SUI)	CLAS–Cajastur	+ 1' 07"
3	Laudelino Cubino (ESP)	Amaya Seguros	+ 1' 19"
4	Pedro Delgado (ESP)	Banesto	+ 1' 34"
5	Federico Echave (ESP)	CLAS–Cajastur	+ 1' 41"
6	Marco Giovannetti (ITA)	Gatorade–Chateau d'Ax	+ 2' 36"
7	Fabio Parra (COL)	Amaya Seguros	+ 3' 10"
8	Stephen Roche (IRL)	Carrera Jeans–Vagabond	+ 7' 44"
9	Alex Zülle (SUI)	ONCE	+ 8' 32"
10	Pello Ruiz Cabestany (ESP)	Gatorade–Chateau d'Ax	+ 9' 50"

== Stage 10 ==
6 May 1992 — Luz-Saint-Sauveur to Sabiñánigo, 196 km (122 mi)

Stage 10 result

Rank	Rider	Team	Time
1	Julio César Cadena (COL)	Kelme–Don Cafe	5h 15' 49"
2	Arsenio González (ESP)	CLAS–Cajastur	+ 3' 13"
3	Roberto Torres (ESP)	Lotus–Festina	+ 3' 27"
4	Jesper Skibby (DEN)	TVM–Sanyo	+ 4' 21"
5	Roberto Pagnin (ITA)	Lotus–Festina	s.t.
6	Harald Maier (AUT)	PDM–Ultima–Concorde	s.t.
7	Franco Ballerini (ITA)	GB–MG Maglificio	s.t.
8	Juan Carlos González Salvador (ESP)	Puertas Mavisa	s.t.
9	Uwe Raab (GER)	PDM–Ultima–Concorde	s.t.
10	Américo José Neves Da Silva (POR)	Artiach–Royal	s.t.

General classification after Stage 10

Rank	Rider	Team	Time
1	Jesús Montoya (ESP)	Amaya Seguros	46h 01' 46"
2	Tony Rominger (SUI)	CLAS–Cajastur	+ 1' 07"
3	Laudelino Cubino (ESP)	Amaya Seguros	+ 1' 19"
4	Pedro Delgado (ESP)	Banesto	+ 1' 34"
5	Federico Echave (ESP)	CLAS–Cajastur	+ 1' 41"
6	Marco Giovannetti (ITA)	Gatorade–Chateau d'Ax	+ 2' 36"
7	Fabio Parra (COL)	Amaya Seguros	+ 3' 10"
8	Stephen Roche (IRL)	Carrera Jeans–Vagabond	+ 7' 44"
9	Pello Ruiz Cabestany (ESP)	Gatorade–Chateau d'Ax	+ 9' 50"
10	Raúl Alcalá (MEX)	PDM–Ultima–Concorde	+ 10' 24"
