= 1991 Vuelta a España, Stage 1 to Stage 10 =

Cycling race stages

The 1991 Vuelta a España was the 46th edition of the Vuelta a España, one of cycling's Grand Tours. The Vuelta began in Mérida, with an individual time trial on 29 April, and Stage 10 occurred on 8 May with a stage to Andorra la Vella. The race finished in Madrid on 19 May.

== Stage 1 ==
29 April 1991 — Mérida to Mérida, 8.8 km (5.5 mi) (TTT)

Stage 1 result and general classification after Stage 1

Rank	Rider	Team	Time
1	Melcior Mauri (ESP)	ONCE	10' 57"
2	Anselmo Fuerte (ESP)	ONCE	s.t.
3	Herminio Díaz Zabala (ESP)	ONCE	s.t.
4	Raúl Alcalá (MEX)	PDM–Concorde–Ultima	+ 8"
5	Tom Cordes (NED)	PDM–Concorde–Ultima	s.t.
6	Julián Gorospe (ESP)	Banesto	+ 12"
7	Miguel Induráin (ESP)	Banesto	s.t.
8	José Luis Santamaría (ESP)	Banesto	s.t.
9	Uwe Raab (GER)	PDM–Concorde–Ultima	+ 13"
10	Marino Lejarreta (ESP)	ONCE	+ 16"

== Stage 2a ==
30 April 1991 — Mérida to Cáceres, 134.5 km (83.6 mi)

Stage 2a result

Rank	Rider	Team	Time
1	Michel Zanoli (NED)	Tulip Computers	3h 13' 56"
2	Eddy Planckaert (BEL)	Panasonic–Sportlife	s.t.
3	Juan Carlos González (ESP)	Puertas Mavisa	s.t.
4	Jesper Skibby (DEN)	TVM–Sanyo	s.t.
5	Urs Freuler (SUI)	Team Telekom	s.t.
6	Uwe Raab (GER)	PDM–Concorde–Ultima	s.t.
7	Asiat Saitov (URS)	Kelme–Ibexpress	s.t.
8	Olaf Ludwig (GER)	Panasonic–Sportlife	s.t.
9	Malcolm Elliott (GBR)	Seur–Otero	s.t.
10	Mathieu Hermans (NED)	Lotus–Festina	s.t.

General classification after Stage 2a

Rank	Rider	Team	Time
1	Anselmo Fuerte (ESP)	ONCE	
2	Melcior Mauri (ESP)	ONCE	s.t.
3	Herminio Díaz Zabala (ESP)	ONCE	s.t.

== Stage 2b ==
30 April 1991 — Montijo to Badajoz, 40.4 km (25.1 mi) (TTT)

Stage 2b result

Rank	Team	Time
1	ONCE	50' 27"
2	CLAS–Cajastur	+ 41"
3	PDM–Concorde–Ultima	+ 55"
4	TVM–Sanyo	+ 1' 37"
5	Seur–Otero	s.t.
6	Panasonic–Sportlife	+ 1' 38"
7	Buckler–Colnago–Decca	+ 1' 44"
8	Banesto	+ 1' 46"
9	Postobón–Manzana–Ryalcao	+ 2' 02"
10	Tulip Computers	+ 2' 08"

General classification after Stage 2b

Rank	Rider	Team	Time
1	Melcior Mauri (ESP)	ONCE	4h 14' 30"
2	Anselmo Fuerte (ESP)	ONCE	s.t.
3	Herminio Díaz Zabala (ESP)	ONCE	s.t.
4	Johnny Weltz (DEN)	ONCE	+ 16"
5	José Luis Villanueva (ESP)	ONCE	s.t.
6	Marino Lejarreta (ESP)	ONCE	s.t.
7	Eduardo Chozas (ESP)	ONCE	+ 33"
8	Luis María Díaz De Otazu (ESP)	ONCE	s.t.
9	Santos Hernández (ESP)	ONCE	s.t.
10	Tom Cordes (NED)	PDM–Concorde–Ultima	+ 1' 03"

== Stage 3 ==
1 May 1991 — Badajoz to Seville, 233.2 km (144.9 mi)

Stage 3 result

Rank	Rider	Team	Time
1	Jesper Skibby (DEN)	TVM–Sanyo	5h 33' 13"
2	Uwe Raab (GER)	PDM–Concorde–Ultima	s.t.
3	Alfonso Gutiérrez (ESP)	Paternina–Don Zoilo	s.t.
4	Manuel Jorge Domínguez (ESP)	CLAS–Cajastur	s.t.
5	Dimitri Konyshev (URS)	TVM–Sanyo	s.t.
6	Guido Bontempi (ITA)	Carrera Jeans–Tassoni	s.t.
7	Iñaki Gastón (ESP)	CLAS–Cajastur	s.t.
8	Juan Guillén (ESP)	Puertas Mavisa	s.t.
9	Jorge Silva (POR)	Sicasal-Acral	s.t.
10	José Rodriguez (ESP)	Seur–Otero	s.t.

General classification after Stage 3

Rank	Rider	Team	Time
1	Herminio Díaz Zabala (ESP)	ONCE	9h 47' 43"
2	Melcior Mauri (ESP)	ONCE	s.t.
3	Anselmo Fuerte (ESP)	ONCE	s.t.
4	Johnny Weltz (DEN)	ONCE	+ 16"
5	José Luis Villanueva (ESP)	ONCE	s.t.
6	Marino Lejarreta (ESP)	ONCE	s.t.
7	Eduardo Chozas (ESP)	ONCE	+ 33"
8	Santos Hernández (ESP)	ONCE	s.t.
9	Tom Cordes (NED)	PDM–Concorde–Ultima	+ 1' 03"
10	Raúl Alcalá (MEX)	PDM–Concorde–Ultima	s.t.

== Stage 4 ==
2 May 1991 — Seville to Jaén, 292 km (181 mi)

Stage 4 result

Rank	Rider	Team	Time
1	Jesús Cruz Martín (ESP)	Wigarma	6h 47' 04"
2	Malcolm Elliott (GBR)	Seur–Otero	+ 9' 24"
3	Eddy Planckaert (BEL)	Panasonic–Sportlife	s.t.
4	Mario De Clercq (BEL)	Buckler–Colnago–Decca	s.t.
5	Mario Manzoni (ITA)	Chateau d'Ax–Gatorade	s.t.
6	Asiat Saitov (URS)	Kelme–Ibexpress	s.t.
7	Giovanni Fidanza (ITA)	Chateau d'Ax–Gatorade	s.t.
8	Alfonso Gutiérrez (ESP)	Paternina–Don Zoilo	s.t.
9	Acácio da Silva (POR)	Lotus–Festina	s.t.
10	Uwe Raab (GER)	PDM–Concorde–Ultima	s.t.

General classification after Stage 4

Rank	Rider	Team	Time
1	Melcior Mauri (ESP)	ONCE	16h 44' 11"
2	Anselmo Fuerte (ESP)	ONCE	s.t.
3	Herminio Díaz Zabala (ESP)	ONCE	s.t.
4	Johnny Weltz (DEN)	ONCE	+ 16"
5	Marino Lejarreta (ESP)	ONCE	s.t.
6	José Luis Villanueva (ESP)	ONCE	s.t.
7	Eduardo Chozas (ESP)	ONCE	+ 33"
8	Santos Hernández (ESP)	ONCE	s.t.
9	Tom Cordes (NED)	PDM–Concorde–Ultima	+ 1' 03"
10	Raúl Alcalá (MEX)	PDM–Concorde–Ultima	s.t.

== Stage 5 ==
3 May 1991 — Linares to Albacete, 227.8 km (141.5 mi)

Stage 5 result

Rank	Rider	Team	Time
1	Uwe Raab (GER)	PDM–Concorde–Ultima	5h 36' 51"
2	Adri van der Poel (NED)	Tulip Computers	s.t.
3	Alfonso Gutiérrez (ESP)	Paternina–Don Zoilo	s.t.
4	Melcior Mauri (ESP)	ONCE	s.t.
5	Manuel Jorge Domínguez (ESP)	CLAS–Cajastur	s.t.
6	Américo Silva (POR)	Artiach–Royal	s.t.
7	Antonio Esparza (ESP)	Wigarma	s.t.
8	Max Sciandri (ITA)	Carrera Jeans–Tassoni	s.t.
9	Juan Carlos González (ESP)	Puertas Mavisa	s.t.
10	José Rodriguez (ESP)	Seur–Otero	s.t.

General classification after Stage 5

Rank	Rider	Team	Time
1	Melcior Mauri (ESP)	ONCE	22h 21' 03"
2	Anselmo Fuerte (ESP)	ONCE	s.t.
3	Herminio Díaz Zabala (ESP)	ONCE	s.t.
4	Johnny Weltz (DEN)	ONCE	+ 16"
5	Marino Lejarreta (ESP)	ONCE	s.t.
6	José Luis Villanueva (ESP)	ONCE	s.t.
7	Eduardo Chozas (ESP)	ONCE	+ 33"
8	Santos Hernández (ESP)	ONCE	+ 56"
9	Raúl Alcalá (MEX)	PDM–Concorde–Ultima	+ 1' 03"
10	Uwe Raab (GER)	PDM–Concorde–Ultima	+ 1' 08"

== Stage 6 ==
4 May 1991 — Albacete to Valencia, 236.5 km (147.0 mi)

Stage 6 result

Rank	Rider	Team	Time
1	Jean-Paul van Poppel (NED)	PDM–Concorde–Ultima	5h 09' 49"
2	Olaf Ludwig (GER)	Panasonic–Sportlife	s.t.
3	Eddy Planckaert (BEL)	Panasonic–Sportlife	s.t.
4	Eric Vanderaerden (BEL)	Buckler–Colnago–Decca	s.t.
5	Uwe Raab (GER)	PDM–Concorde–Ultima	s.t.
6	Mario Manzoni (ITA)	Chateau d'Ax–Gatorade	s.t.
7	Juan Carlos González (ESP)	Puertas Mavisa	s.t.
8	Michel Zanoli (NED)	Tulip Computers	s.t.
9	John Talen (NED)	PDM–Concorde–Ultima	s.t.
10	Giovanni Fidanza (ITA)	Chateau d'Ax–Gatorade	s.t.

General classification after Stage 6

Rank	Rider	Team	Time
1	Melcior Mauri (ESP)	ONCE	27h 30' 52"
2	Anselmo Fuerte (ESP)	ONCE	s.t.
3	Herminio Díaz Zabala (ESP)	ONCE	s.t.
4	Johnny Weltz (DEN)	ONCE	+ 16"
5	Marino Lejarreta (ESP)	ONCE	s.t.
6	José Luis Villanueva (ESP)	ONCE	s.t.
7	Eduardo Chozas (ESP)	ONCE	+ 33"
8	Santos Hernández (ESP)	ONCE	+ 56"
9	Raúl Alcalá (MEX)	PDM–Concorde–Ultima	+ 1' 03"
10	Uwe Raab (GER)	PDM–Concorde–Ultima	+ 1' 08"

== Stage 7 ==
5 May 1991 — Palma de Mallorca to Palma de Mallorca, 188 km (117 mi)

Stage 7 result

Rank	Rider	Team	Time
1	Jesper Skibby (DEN)	TVM–Sanyo	4h 20' 07"
2	Steven Rooks (NED)	Buckler–Colnago–Decca	s.t.
3	Max Sciandri (ITA)	Carrera Jeans–Tassoni	s.t.
4	Acácio da Silva (POR)	Lotus–Festina	s.t.
5	Malcolm Elliott (GBR)	Seur–Otero	s.t.
6	Melcior Mauri (ESP)	ONCE	s.t.
7	Pello Ruiz Cabestany (ESP)	CLAS–Cajastur	s.t.
8	Jesús Rodríguez Rodríguez (ESP)	Puertas Mavisa	s.t.
9	Darius Kaiser (GER)	Team Telekom	s.t.
10	Herminio Díaz Zabala (ESP)	ONCE	s.t.

General classification after Stage 7

Rank	Rider	Team	Time
1	Melcior Mauri (ESP)	ONCE	32h 12' 59"
2	Herminio Díaz Zabala (ESP)	ONCE	s.t.
3	Anselmo Fuerte (ESP)	ONCE	s.t.
4	Johnny Weltz (DEN)	ONCE	+ 16"
5	Marino Lejarreta (ESP)	ONCE	s.t.
6	José Luis Villanueva (ESP)	ONCE	s.t.
7	Eduardo Chozas (ESP)	ONCE	+ 33"
8	Santos Hernández (ESP)	ONCE	+ 56"
9	Raúl Alcalá (MEX)	PDM–Concorde–Ultima	+ 1' 03"
10	Iñaki Gastón (ESP)	CLAS–Cajastur	+ 1' 08"

== Stage 8 ==
6 May 1991 — Cala d'Or to Cala d'Or, 47 km (29 mi) (ITT)

Stage 8 result

Rank	Rider	Team	Time
1	Melcior Mauri (ESP)	ONCE	1h 00' 22"
2	Raúl Alcalá (MEX)	PDM–Concorde–Ultima	+ 11"
3	Tom Cordes (NED)	PDM–Concorde–Ultima	+ 46"
4	Federico Echave (ESP)	CLAS–Cajastur	s.t.
5	Miguel Induráin (ESP)	Banesto	+ 56"
6	Eric Vanderaerden (BEL)	Buckler–Colnago–Decca	+ 1' 47"
7	Steven Rooks (NED)	Buckler–Colnago–Decca	+ 1' 59"
8	Julián Gorospe (ESP)	Banesto	+ 2' 02"
9	Pello Ruiz Cabestany (ESP)	CLAS–Cajastur	+ 2' 06"
10	José Luis Villanueva (ESP)	ONCE	+ 2' 08"

General classification after Stage 8

Rank	Rider	Team	Time
1	Melcior Mauri (ESP)	ONCE	33h 13' 21"
2	Raúl Alcalá (MEX)	PDM–Concorde–Ultima	+ 1' 14"
3	Federico Echave (ESP)	CLAS–Cajastur	+ 1' 54"
4	Tom Cordes (NED)	PDM–Concorde–Ultima	+ 2' 12"
5	Herminio Díaz Zabala (ESP)	ONCE	+ 2' 23"
6	José Luis Villanueva (ESP)	ONCE	+ 2' 24"
7	Miguel Induráin (ESP)	Banesto	+ 2' 54"
8	Marino Lejarreta (ESP)	ONCE	+ 2' 59"
9	Pello Ruiz Cabestany (ESP)	CLAS–Cajastur	+ 3' 14"
10	Eduardo Chozas (ESP)	ONCE	+ 3' 18"

== Stage 9 ==
7 May 1991 — Sant Cugat del Vallès to Lloret de Mar, 140 km (87 mi)

Stage 9 result

Rank	Rider	Team	Time
1	Jean-Paul van Poppel (NED)	PDM–Concorde–Ultima	3h 14' 50"
2	Uwe Raab (GER)	PDM–Concorde–Ultima	s.t.
3	Michel Zanoli (NED)	Tulip Computers	s.t.
4	Juan Carlos González (ESP)	Puertas Mavisa	s.t.
5	Giovanni Fidanza (ITA)	Chateau d'Ax–Gatorade	s.t.
6	Olaf Ludwig (GER)	Panasonic–Sportlife	s.t.
7	José Rodriguez (ESP)	Seur–Otero	s.t.
8	Marcel Wüst (GER)	RMO	s.t.
9	Asiat Saitov (URS)	Kelme–Ibexpress	s.t.
10	Urs Freuler (SUI)	Team Telekom	s.t.

General classification after Stage 9

Rank	Rider	Team	Time
1	Melcior Mauri (ESP)	ONCE	36h 28' 11"
2	Raúl Alcalá (MEX)	PDM–Concorde–Ultima	+ 1' 14"
3	Federico Echave (ESP)	CLAS–Cajastur	+ 1' 54"
4	Tom Cordes (NED)	PDM–Concorde–Ultima	+ 2' 12"
5	Herminio Díaz Zabala (ESP)	ONCE	+ 2' 23"
6	José Luis Villanueva (ESP)	ONCE	+ 2' 24"
7	Miguel Induráin (ESP)	Banesto	+ 2' 54"
8	Marino Lejarreta (ESP)	ONCE	+ 2' 59"
9	Pello Ruiz Cabestany (ESP)	CLAS–Cajastur	+ 3' 14"
10	Eduardo Chozas (ESP)	ONCE	+ 3' 18"

== Stage 10 ==
8 May 1991 — Lloret de Mar to Andorra la Vella, 229 km (142 mi)

Stage 10 result

Rank	Rider	Team	Time
1	Guido Bontempi (ITA)	Carrera Jeans–Tassoni	6h 35' 44"
2	Udo Bölts (GER)	Team Telekom	+ 4"
3	Uwe Raab (GER)	PDM–Concorde–Ultima	+ 13"
4	Juan Carlos González (ESP)	Puertas Mavisa	s.t.
5	Mario De Clercq (BEL)	Buckler–Colnago–Decca	s.t.
6	Eric Vanderaerden (BEL)	Buckler–Colnago–Decca	s.t.
7	Eduardo Chozas (ESP)	ONCE	s.t.
8	Max Sciandri (ITA)	Carrera Jeans–Tassoni	s.t.
9	Luis María Díaz De Otazu (ESP)	ONCE	s.t.
10	Marc van Orsouw (NED)	Panasonic–Sportlife	s.t.

General classification after Stage 10

Rank	Rider	Team	Time
1	Melcior Mauri (ESP)	ONCE	43h 04' 08"
2	Raúl Alcalá (MEX)	PDM–Concorde–Ultima	+ 1' 14"
3	Federico Echave (ESP)	CLAS–Cajastur	+ 1' 54"
4	Tom Cordes (NED)	PDM–Concorde–Ultima	+ 2' 12"
5	Herminio Díaz Zabala (ESP)	ONCE	+ 2' 13"
6	José Luis Villanueva (ESP)	ONCE	+ 2' 24"
7	Miguel Induráin (ESP)	Banesto	+ 2' 54"
8	Marino Lejarreta (ESP)	ONCE	+ 2' 59"
9	Pello Ruiz Cabestany (ESP)	CLAS–Cajastur	+ 3' 14"
10	Eduardo Chozas (ESP)	ONCE	+ 3' 34"
