= 1992 Vuelta a España, Stage 11 to Stage 21 =

Cycling race stages

The 1992 Vuelta a España was the 47th edition of the Vuelta a España, one of cycling's Grand Tours. The Vuelta began in Jerez de la Frontera, with an individual time trial on 27 April, and Stage 11 occurred on 7 May with a stage from Sabiñánigo. The race finished in Madrid on 17 May.

== Stage 11 ==
7 May 1992 — Sabiñánigo to Pamplona, 162.9 km (101.2 mi)

Stage 11 result

Rank	Rider	Team	Time
1	Djamolidine Abdoujaparov (UZB)	Carrera Jeans–Vagabond	3h 50' 41"
2	Uwe Raab (GER)	PDM–Ultima–Concorde	s.t.
3	Jean-Paul van Poppel (NED)	PDM–Ultima–Concorde	s.t.
4	Juan Carlos González Salvador (ESP)	Puertas Mavisa	s.t.
5	Roberto Pagnin (ITA)	Lotus–Festina	s.t.
6	Jelle Nijdam (NED)	Buckler–Colnago–Decca	s.t.
7	Oleg Petrovich Chuzhda (UKR)	Seur	s.t.
8	Scott Sunderland (AUS)	TVM–Sanyo	s.t.
9	Malcolm Elliott (GBR)	Seur	s.t.
10	Marc Bouillon (BEL)	Collstrop	s.t.

General classification after Stage 11

Rank	Rider	Team	Time
1	Jesús Montoya (ESP)	Amaya Seguros	49h 52' 27"
2	Tony Rominger (SUI)	CLAS–Cajastur	+ 1' 07"
3	Laudelino Cubino (ESP)	Amaya Seguros	+ 1' 19"
4	Pedro Delgado (ESP)	Banesto	+ 1' 34"
5	Federico Echave (ESP)	CLAS–Cajastur	+ 1' 41"
6	Marco Giovannetti (ITA)	Gatorade–Chateau d'Ax	+ 2' 36"
7	Fabio Parra (COL)	Amaya Seguros	+ 3' 10"
8	Stephen Roche (IRL)	Carrera Jeans–Vagabond	+ 7' 44"
9	Pello Ruiz Cabestany (ESP)	Gatorade–Chateau d'Ax	+ 9' 50"
10	Raúl Alcalá (MEX)	PDM–Ultima–Concorde	+ 10' 24"

== Stage 12 ==
8 May 1992 — Pamplona to Burgos, 200.1 km (124.3 mi)

Stage 12 result

Rank	Rider	Team	Time
1	Johan Bruyneel (BEL)	ONCE	4h 48' 03"
2	Fabio Hernán Rodríguez (COL)	CLAS–Cajastur	s.t.
3	Scott Sunderland (AUS)	TVM–Sanyo	+ 12"
4	Jorge Manuel Silva Dos Santos (POR)	Sicasal–Acral	s.t.
5	Fernando Piñero (ESP)	Lotus–Festina	s.t.
6	Guido Bontempi (ITA)	Carrera Jeans–Vagabond	s.t.
7	Piotr Ugrumov (LAT)	Seur	s.t.
8	Luis Pérez García (ESP)	Lotus–Festina	s.t.
9	José Andrés Ripoll Jover (ESP)	Wigarma	s.t.
10	Edwig Van Hooydonck (BEL)	Buckler–Colnago–Decca	s.t.

General classification after Stage 12

Rank	Rider	Team	Time
1	Jesús Montoya (ESP)	Amaya Seguros	54h 41' 25"
2	Tony Rominger (SUI)	CLAS–Cajastur	+ 1' 07"
3	Laudelino Cubino (ESP)	Amaya Seguros	+ 1' 19"
4	Pedro Delgado (ESP)	Banesto	+ 1' 34"
5	Federico Echave (ESP)	CLAS–Cajastur	+ 1' 41"
6	Marco Giovannetti (ITA)	Gatorade–Chateau d'Ax	+ 2' 36"
7	Fabio Parra (COL)	Amaya Seguros	+ 3' 10"
8	Stephen Roche (IRL)	Carrera Jeans–Vagabond	+ 7' 44"
9	Pello Ruiz Cabestany (ESP)	Gatorade–Chateau d'Ax	+ 9' 50"
10	Raúl Alcalá (MEX)	PDM–Ultima–Concorde	+ 10' 24"

== Stage 13 ==
9 May 1992 — Burgos to Santander, 178.3 km (110.8 mi)

Stage 13 result

Rank	Rider	Team	Time
1	Roberto Torres (ESP)	Lotus–Festina	4h 25' 30"
2	Orlando Rodrigues (POR)	Sicasal–Acral	+ 2' 51"
3	Nico Emonds (BEL)	Mercatone Uno–Medeghini–Zucchini	+ 2' 52"
4	Gert-Jan Theunisse (NED)	TVM–Sanyo	s.t.
5	José Luis Rodríguez (ESP)	Seur	s.t.
6	Serafim Vieira da Araújo (POR)	Sicasal–Acral	s.t.
7	Nikolai Galitchanin (RUS)	USSR	s.t.
8	Pedro Delgado (ESP)	Banesto	s.t.
9	Tony Rominger (SUI)	CLAS–Cajastur	s.t.
10	Federico Echave (ESP)	CLAS–Cajastur	s.t.

General classification after Stage 13

Rank	Rider	Team	Time
1	Jesús Montoya (ESP)	Amaya Seguros	59h 09' 47"
2	Tony Rominger (SUI)	CLAS–Cajastur	+ 1' 07"
3	Laudelino Cubino (ESP)	Amaya Seguros	+ 1' 25"
4	Pedro Delgado (ESP)	Banesto	+ 1' 34"
5	Federico Echave (ESP)	CLAS–Cajastur	+ 1' 41"
6	Marco Giovannetti (ITA)	Gatorade–Chateau d'Ax	+ 2' 36"
7	Fabio Parra (COL)	Amaya Seguros	+ 3' 16"
8	Stephen Roche (IRL)	Carrera Jeans–Vagabond	+ 7' 50"
9	Pello Ruiz Cabestany (ESP)	Gatorade–Chateau d'Ax	+ 9' 56"
10	Raúl Alcalá (MEX)	PDM–Ultima–Concorde	+ 10' 30"

== Stage 14 ==
10 May 1992 — Santander to Lakes of Covadonga, 213.4 km (132.6 mi)

Stage 14 result

Rank	Rider	Team	Time
1	Pedro Delgado (ESP)	Banesto	5h 51' 50"
2	Tony Rominger (SUI)	CLAS–Cajastur	+ 39"
3	Jesús Montoya (ESP)	Amaya Seguros	+ 51"
4	Fabio Hernán Rodríguez (COL)	CLAS–Cajastur	+ 1' 15"
5	Raúl Alcalá (MEX)	PDM–Ultima–Concorde	+ 1' 18"
6	Federico Echave (ESP)	CLAS–Cajastur	+ 1' 35"
7	Francisco Javier Mauleón (ESP)	CLAS–Cajastur	s.t.
8	José Martín Farfán (COL)	Kelme–Don Cafe	+ 1' 56"
9	Marco Giovannetti (ITA)	Gatorade–Chateau d'Ax	+ 2' 05"
10	Gert-Jan Theunisse (NED)	TVM–Sanyo	+ 2' 42"

General classification after Stage 14

Rank	Rider	Team	Time
1	Jesús Montoya (ESP)	Amaya Seguros	65h 02' 28"
2	Pedro Delgado (ESP)	Banesto	+ 43"
3	Tony Rominger (SUI)	CLAS–Cajastur	+ 55"
4	Federico Echave (ESP)	CLAS–Cajastur	+ 2' 25"
5	Laudelino Cubino (ESP)	Amaya Seguros	+ 3' 20"
6	Marco Giovannetti (ITA)	Gatorade–Chateau d'Ax	+ 3' 50"
7	Fabio Parra (COL)	Amaya Seguros	+ 5' 11"
8	Stephen Roche (IRL)	Carrera Jeans–Vagabond	+ 10' 30"
9	Raúl Alcalá (MEX)	PDM–Ultima–Concorde	+ 10' 57"
10	Francisco Javier Mauleón (ESP)	CLAS–Cajastur	+ 11' 58"

== Stage 15 ==
11 May 1992 — Cangas de Onís to Alto del Naranco, 163 km (101 mi)

Stage 15 result

Rank	Rider	Team	Time
1	Francisco Javier Mauleón (ESP)	CLAS–Cajastur	4h 01' 36"
2	Jesús Montoya (ESP)	Amaya Seguros	s.t.
3	Tony Rominger (SUI)	CLAS–Cajastur	s.t.
4	Pedro Delgado (ESP)	Banesto	+ 6"
5	Laudelino Cubino (ESP)	Amaya Seguros	+ 10"
6	Stephen Roche (IRL)	Carrera Jeans–Vagabond	+ 13"
7	Steven Rooks (NED)	Buckler–Colnago–Decca	s.t.
8	Fabio Hernán Rodríguez (COL)	CLAS–Cajastur	+ 17"
9	Federico Echave (ESP)	CLAS–Cajastur	s.t.
10	Joaquim Llach Ramisa (ESP)	Artiach–Royal	+ 19"

General classification after Stage 15

Rank	Rider	Team	Time
1	Jesús Montoya (ESP)	Amaya Seguros	69h 04' 04"
2	Pedro Delgado (ESP)	Banesto	+ 49"
3	Tony Rominger (SUI)	CLAS–Cajastur	+ 55"
4	Federico Echave (ESP)	CLAS–Cajastur	+ 2' 42"
5	Laudelino Cubino (ESP)	Amaya Seguros	+ 3' 30"
6	Marco Giovannetti (ITA)	Gatorade–Chateau d'Ax	+ 4' 12"
7	Fabio Parra (COL)	Amaya Seguros	+ 5' 59"
8	Stephen Roche (IRL)	Carrera Jeans–Vagabond	+ 10' 43"
9	Raúl Alcalá (MEX)	PDM–Ultima–Concorde	+ 11' 19"
10	Francisco Javier Mauleón (ESP)	CLAS–Cajastur	+ 11' 58"

== Stage 16 ==
12 May 1992 — Oviedo to León, 162 km (101 mi)

Stage 16 result

Rank	Rider	Team	Time
1	Tom Cordes (NED)	PDM–Ultima–Concorde	4h 06' 08"
~~2~~	~~Bernardo González (ESP)~~	~~Kelme–Don Cafe~~	~~s.t.~~
2	Álvaro Mejía (COL)	Postobón–Manzana–Ryalcao	s.t.
4	Aitor Garmendia (ESP)	Banesto	s.t.
5	Robert Millar (GBR)	TVM–Sanyo	s.t.
6	Santos Hernández (ESP)	Artiach–Royal	+ 5"
7	Hernán Buenahora (COL)	Kelme–Don Cafe	s.t.
8	William Palacio (COL)	Postobón–Manzana–Ryalcao	+ 10"
9	Oliverio Rincón (COL)	Kelme–Don Cafe	+ 15"
10	Djamolidine Abdoujaparov (UZB)	Carrera Jeans–Vagabond	+ 3' 49"

General classification after Stage 16

Rank	Rider	Team	Time
1	Jesús Montoya (ESP)	Amaya Seguros	73h 14' 01"
2	Pedro Delgado (ESP)	Banesto	+ 49"
3	Tony Rominger (SUI)	CLAS–Cajastur	+ 55"
4	Federico Echave (ESP)	CLAS–Cajastur	+ 2' 42"
5	Laudelino Cubino (ESP)	Amaya Seguros	+ 3' 30"
6	Marco Giovannetti (ITA)	Gatorade–Chateau d'Ax	+ 4' 12"
7	Fabio Parra (COL)	Amaya Seguros	+ 5' 59"
8	Stephen Roche (IRL)	Carrera Jeans–Vagabond	+ 10' 43"
9	Raúl Alcalá (MEX)	PDM–Ultima–Concorde	+ 11' 19"
10	Francisco Javier Mauleón (ESP)	CLAS–Cajastur	+ 11' 58"

== Stage 17 ==
13 May 1992 — León to Salamanca, 200.6 km (124.6 mi)

Stage 17 result

Rank	Rider	Team	Time
1	Eric Vanderaerden (BEL)	Buckler–Colnago–Decca	6h 27' 51"
2	Jelle Nijdam (NED)	Buckler–Colnago–Decca	s.t.
3	Jean-Paul van Poppel (NED)	PDM–Ultima–Concorde	s.t.
4	Silvio Martinello (ITA)	Mercatone Uno–Medeghini–Zucchini	s.t.
5	Juan Carlos González Salvador (ESP)	Puertas Mavisa	s.t.
6	Uwe Raab (GER)	PDM–Ultima–Concorde	s.t.
7	Djamolidine Abdoujaparov (UZB)	Carrera Jeans–Vagabond	s.t.
8	Casimiro Moreda (ESP)	Puertas Mavisa	+ 4"
9	Roustam Toukhvatoulin (RUS)	USSR	+ 5"
10	Tony Rominger (SUI)	CLAS–Cajastur	s.t.

General classification after Stage 17

Rank	Rider	Team	Time
1	Jesús Montoya (ESP)	Amaya Seguros	79h 41' 57"
2	Pedro Delgado (ESP)	Banesto	+ 49"
3	Tony Rominger (SUI)	CLAS–Cajastur	+ 55"
4	Federico Echave (ESP)	CLAS–Cajastur	+ 2' 42"
5	Laudelino Cubino (ESP)	Amaya Seguros	+ 3' 30"
6	Marco Giovannetti (ITA)	Gatorade–Chateau d'Ax	+ 4' 12"
7	Fabio Parra (COL)	Amaya Seguros	+ 6' 10"
8	Stephen Roche (IRL)	Carrera Jeans–Vagabond	+ 10' 43"
9	Raúl Alcalá (MEX)	PDM–Ultima–Concorde	+ 11' 19"
10	Francisco Javier Mauleón (ESP)	CLAS–Cajastur	+ 11' 58"

== Stage 18 ==
14 May 1992 — Salamanca to Ávila, 218.9 km (136.0 mi)

Stage 18 result

Rank	Rider	Team	Time
1	Enrico Zaina (ITA)	Mercatone Uno–Medeghini–Zucchini	6h 28' 02"
2	Francisco Javier Mauleón (ESP)	CLAS–Cajastur	s.t.
3	Robert Millar (GBR)	TVM–Sanyo	s.t.
4	Pedro Delgado (ESP)	Banesto	+ 9"
5	Tony Rominger (SUI)	CLAS–Cajastur	s.t.
6	José Martín Farfán (COL)	Kelme–Don Cafe	s.t.
7	Steven Rooks (NED)	Buckler–Colnago–Decca	+ 12"
8	Jesús Montoya (ESP)	Amaya Seguros	s.t.
9	Gert-Jan Theunisse (NED)	TVM–Sanyo	s.t.
10	Federico Echave (ESP)	CLAS–Cajastur	s.t.

General classification after Stage 18

Rank	Rider	Team	Time
1	Jesús Montoya (ESP)	Amaya Seguros	86h 10' 11"
2	Pedro Delgado (ESP)	Banesto	+ 46"
3	Tony Rominger (SUI)	CLAS–Cajastur	+ 52"
4	Federico Echave (ESP)	CLAS–Cajastur	+ 2' 42"
5	Laudelino Cubino (ESP)	Amaya Seguros	+ 3' 36"
6	Marco Giovannetti (ITA)	Gatorade–Chateau d'Ax	+ 4' 31"
7	Fabio Parra (COL)	Amaya Seguros	+ 6' 29"
8	Raúl Alcalá (MEX)	PDM–Ultima–Concorde	+ 11' 19"
9	Francisco Javier Mauleón (ESP)	CLAS–Cajastur	+ 11' 46"
10	Robert Millar (GBR)	TVM–Sanyo	+ 14' 03"

== Stage 19 ==
15 May 1992 — Fuenlabrada to Fuenlabrada, 37.9 km (23.5 mi) (ITT)

Stage 19 result

Rank	Rider	Team	Time
1	Tony Rominger (SUI)	CLAS–Cajastur	46' 18"
2	Eric Vanderaerden (BEL)	Buckler–Colnago–Decca	+ 52"
3	Erik Breukink (NED)	PDM–Ultima–Concorde	+ 1' 08"
4	Marco Giovannetti (ITA)	Gatorade–Chateau d'Ax	+ 1' 33"
5	Fabio Parra (COL)	Amaya Seguros	+ 1' 40"
6	Pedro Delgado (ESP)	Banesto	+ 1' 41"
7	Jesús Montoya (ESP)	Amaya Seguros	+ 1' 49"
8	Thomas Wegmüller (SUI)	Lotus–Festina	+ 1' 53"
9	Artūras Kasputis (LTU)	Postobón–Manzana–Ryalcao	+ 1' 59"
10	Stephen Hodge (AUS)	ONCE	+ 2' 05"

General classification after Stage 19

Rank	Rider	Team	Time
1	Tony Rominger (SUI)	CLAS–Cajastur	86h 57' 21"
2	Jesús Montoya (ESP)	Amaya Seguros	+ 57"
3	Pedro Delgado (ESP)	Banesto	+ 1' 35"
4	Marco Giovannetti (ITA)	Gatorade–Chateau d'Ax	+ 5' 12"
5	Federico Echave (ESP)	CLAS–Cajastur	+ 5' 27"
6	Laudelino Cubino (ESP)	Amaya Seguros	+ 6' 17"
7	Fabio Parra (COL)	Amaya Seguros	+ 7' 17"
8	Raúl Alcalá (MEX)	PDM–Ultima–Concorde	+ 12' 43"
9	Francisco Javier Mauleón (ESP)	CLAS–Cajastur	+ 15' 37"
10	Steven Rooks (NED)	Buckler–Colnago–Decca	+ 18' 50"

== Stage 20 ==
16 May 1992 — Collado Villalba to Palazuelos de Eresma (Destilerías DYC), 188.3 km (117.0 mi)

Stage 20 result

Rank	Rider	Team	Time
1	Óscar Vargas (COL)	Amaya Seguros	4h 56' 00"
2	Tony Rominger (SUI)	CLAS–Cajastur	+ 32"
3	Jesús Montoya (ESP)	Amaya Seguros	+ 39"
4	Pedro Delgado (ESP)	Banesto	s.t.
5	Alberto Camargo (COL)	Postobón–Manzana–Ryalcao	s.t.
6	Gert-Jan Theunisse (NED)	TVM–Sanyo	s.t.
7	Luis Pérez García (ESP)	Lotus–Festina	s.t.
8	Francisco Javier Mauleón (ESP)	CLAS–Cajastur	s.t.
9	Federico Echave (ESP)	CLAS–Cajastur	s.t.
10	Marco Giovannetti (ITA)	Gatorade–Chateau d'Ax	s.t.

General classification after Stage 20

Rank	Rider	Team	Time
1	Tony Rominger (SUI)	CLAS–Cajastur	91h 53' 53"
2	Jesús Montoya (ESP)	Amaya Seguros	+ 1' 04"
3	Pedro Delgado (ESP)	Banesto	+ 1' 42"
4	Marco Giovannetti (ITA)	Gatorade–Chateau d'Ax	+ 5' 19"
5	Federico Echave (ESP)	CLAS–Cajastur	+ 5' 34"
6	Laudelino Cubino (ESP)	Amaya Seguros	+ 6' 24"
7	Fabio Parra (COL)	Amaya Seguros	+ 7' 24"
8	Raúl Alcalá (MEX)	PDM–Ultima–Concorde	+ 12' 50"
9	Francisco Javier Mauleón (ESP)	CLAS–Cajastur	+ 15' 44"
10	Steven Rooks (NED)	Buckler–Colnago–Decca	+ 18' 57"

== Stage 21 ==
17 May 1992 — Palazuelos de Eresma (Destilerías DYC) to Madrid, 175 km (109 mi)

Stage 21 result

Rank	Rider	Team	Time
1	Djamolidine Abdoujaparov (UZB)	Carrera Jeans–Vagabond	4h 20' 57"
2	Alfonso Gutiérrez (ESP)	Artiach–Royal	s.t.
3	Juan Carlos González Salvador (ESP)	Puertas Mavisa	s.t.
4	Silvio Martinello (ITA)	Mercatone Uno–Medeghini–Zucchini	s.t.
5	Jean-Paul van Poppel (NED)	PDM–Ultima–Concorde	s.t.
6	Stefano Zanatta (ITA)	Gatorade–Chateau d'Ax	s.t.
7	Jelle Nijdam (NED)	Buckler–Colnago–Decca	s.t.
8	Uwe Raab (GER)	PDM–Ultima–Concorde	s.t.
9	Roberto Pelliconi (ITA)	Mercatone Uno–Medeghini–Zucchini	s.t.
10	Casimiro Moreda (ESP)	Puertas Mavisa	s.t.

General classification after Stage 21

Rank	Rider	Team	Time
1	Tony Rominger (SUI)	CLAS–Cajastur	96h 14' 50"
2	Jesús Montoya (ESP)	Amaya Seguros	+ 1' 04"
3	Pedro Delgado (ESP)	Banesto	+ 1' 42"
4	Marco Giovannetti (ITA)	Gatorade–Chateau d'Ax	+ 5' 19"
5	Federico Echave (ESP)	CLAS–Cajastur	+ 5' 34"
6	Laudelino Cubino (ESP)	Amaya Seguros	+ 6' 24"
7	Fabio Parra (COL)	Amaya Seguros	+ 7' 24"
8	Raúl Alcalá (MEX)	PDM–Ultima–Concorde	+ 12' 50"
9	Francisco Javier Mauleón (ESP)	CLAS–Cajastur	+ 15' 44"
10	Steven Rooks (NED)	Buckler–Colnago–Decca	+ 18' 57"
