= 1991 Vuelta a España, Stage 11 to Stage 21 =

Cycling race stages

The 1991 Vuelta a España was the 46th edition of the Vuelta a España, one of cycling's Grand Tours. The Vuelta began in Mérida, with an individual time trial on April 29. Stage 11 was cancelled on May 9, after snowfall, and stage 12 took place on May 10 with a stage from Bossòst. The race finished in Madrid on 19 May.

== Stage 11 ==
9 May 1991 — Andorra la Vella ~~to Pla-de-Beret~~

This stage was planned to be 134.5 km (83.6 mi) in length, passing over the Port del Cantó, the Port de la Bonaigua and finishing atop the Pla de Beret. The stage was cancelled due to heavy snowfall.

== Stage 12 ==
10 May 1991 — Bossòst to Cerler, 111 km (69 mi)

Stage 12 result

Rank	Rider	Team	Time
1	Ivan Ivanov (URS)	Seur–Otero	3h 11' 44"
2	Fabio Parra (COL)	Amaya Seguros	+ 21"
3	Oliverio Rincón (COL)	Kelme–Ibexpress	+ 33"
4	Luis Herrera (COL)	Postobón–Manzana–Ryalcao	+ 45"
5	Miguel Induráin (ESP)	Banesto	s.t.
6	Marino Lejarreta (ESP)	ONCE	s.t.
7	Federico Echave (ESP)	CLAS–Cajastur	+ 1' 23"
8	Fernando Martínez de Guereñu Ochoa (ESP)	Puertas Mavisa	+ 1' 30"
9	Eduardo Chozas (ESP)	ONCE	+ 1' 48"
10	Henry Cárdenas (COL)	Postobón–Manzana–Ryalcao	s.t.

General classification after Stage 12

Rank	Rider	Team	Time
1	Melcior Mauri (ESP)	ONCE	46h 17' 40"
2	Raúl Alcalá (MEX)	PDM–Concorde–Ultima	+ 1' 14"
3	Federico Echave (ESP)	CLAS–Cajastur	+ 1' 29"
4	Miguel Induráin (ESP)	Banesto	+ 1' 51"
5	Marino Lejarreta (ESP)	ONCE	+ 1' 56"
6	Pello Ruiz Cabestany (ESP)	CLAS–Cajastur	+ 3' 14"
7	Eduardo Chozas (ESP)	ONCE	+ 3' 18"
8	Anselmo Fuerte (ESP)	ONCE	+ 3' 34"
9	Tom Cordes (NED)	PDM–Concorde–Ultima	+ 4' 05"
10	Fabio Parra (COL)	Amaya Seguros	+ 4' 11"

== Stage 13 ==
11 May 1991 — Benasque to Zaragoza, 219 km (136 mi)

Stage 13 result

Rank	Rider	Team	Time
1	Jean-Paul van Poppel (NED)	PDM–Concorde–Ultima	5h 17' 37"
2	John Talen (NED)	PDM–Concorde–Ultima	s.t.
3	Uwe Raab (GER)	PDM–Concorde–Ultima	s.t.
4	Eric Vanderaerden (BEL)	Buckler–Colnago–Decca	s.t.
5	Marcel Arntz (NED)	Team Telekom	s.t.
6	Acácio da Silva (POR)	Lotus–Festina	s.t.
7	Juan Carlos González (ESP)	Puertas Mavisa	s.t.
8	Christian Henn (GER)	Carrera Jeans–Tassoni	s.t.
9	Darius Kaiser (GER)	Team Telekom	s.t.
10	Alfonso Gutiérrez (ESP)	Paternina-Don Zoilo	s.t.

General classification after Stage 13

Rank	Rider	Team	Time
1	Melcior Mauri (ESP)	ONCE	51h 35' 17"
2	Raúl Alcalá (MEX)	PDM–Concorde–Ultima	+ 1' 14"
3	Federico Echave (ESP)	CLAS–Cajastur	+ 1' 29"
4	Miguel Induráin (ESP)	Banesto	+ 1' 51"
5	Marino Lejarreta (ESP)	ONCE	+ 1' 56"
6	Pello Ruiz Cabestany (ESP)	CLAS–Cajastur	+ 3' 14"
7	Eduardo Chozas (ESP)	ONCE	+ 3' 18"
8	Anselmo Fuerte (ESP)	ONCE	+ 3' 34"
9	Tom Cordes (NED)	PDM–Concorde–Ultima	+ 4' 05"
10	Fabio Parra (COL)	Amaya Seguros	+ 4' 11"

== Stage 14 ==
12 May 1991 — Ezcaray to Valdezcaray, 24.1 km (15.0 mi) (ITT)

Stage 14 result

Rank	Rider	Team	Time
1	Fabio Parra (COL)	Amaya Seguros	50' 59"
2	Luis Herrera (COL)	Postobón–Manzana–Ryalcao	+ 57"
3	Ivan Ivanov (URS)	Seur–Otero	+ 1' 08"
4	Marino Lejarreta (ESP)	ONCE	+ 1' 22"
5	Jon Unzaga (ESP)	Seur–Otero	+ 1' 30"
6	Melcior Mauri (ESP)	ONCE	+ 1' 35"
7	Oliverio Rincón (COL)	Kelme–Ibexpress	+ 1' 40"
8	Miguel Induráin (ESP)	Banesto	+ 2' 17"
9	Federico Echave (ESP)	CLAS–Cajastur	+ 2' 22"
10	Anselmo Fuerte (ESP)	ONCE	+ 2' 26"

General classification after Stage 14

Rank	Rider	Team	Time
1	Melcior Mauri (ESP)	ONCE	52h 27' 51"
2	Marino Lejarreta (ESP)	ONCE	+ 1' 43"
3	Federico Echave (ESP)	CLAS–Cajastur	+ 2' 16"
4	Miguel Induráin (ESP)	Banesto	+ 2' 33"
5	Fabio Parra (COL)	Amaya Seguros	+ 2' 36"
6	Raúl Alcalá (MEX)	PDM–Concorde–Ultima	+ 3' 27"
7	Pello Ruiz Cabestany (ESP)	CLAS–Cajastur	+ 4' 08"
8	Anselmo Fuerte (ESP)	ONCE	+ 4' 25"
9	Eduardo Chozas (ESP)	ONCE	+ 6' 23"
10	Oliverio Rincón (COL)	Kelme–Ibexpress	+ 6' 39"

== Stage 15 ==
13 May 1991 — Santo Domingo de la Calzada to Santander, 219.5 km (136.4 mi)

Stage 15 result

Rank	Rider	Team	Time
1	Guido Bontempi (ITA)	Carrera Jeans–Tassoni	5h 40' 05"
2	Malcolm Elliott (GBR)	Seur–Otero	s.t.
3	Acácio da Silva (POR)	Lotus–Festina	s.t.
4	Christophe Manin (FRA)	RMO	s.t.
5	Gerrit de Vries (NED)	Buckler–Colnago–Decca	s.t.
6	Enrique Aja (ESP)	Paternina-Don Zoilo	s.t.
7	Romes Gainetdinov (URS)	Lotus–Festina	s.t.
8	Manuel Ángel Antón Renard (ESP)	Artiach–Royal	+ 8"
9	Antonio Miguel Díaz (ESP)	Kelme–Ibexpress	s.t.
10	Néstor Mora (COL)	Kelme–Ibexpress	s.t.

General classification after Stage 15

Rank	Rider	Team	Time
1	Melcior Mauri (ESP)	ONCE	58h 07' 56"
2	Marino Lejarreta (ESP)	ONCE	+ 1' 43"
3	Federico Echave (ESP)	CLAS–Cajastur	+ 2' 16"
4	Miguel Induráin (ESP)	Banesto	+ 2' 33"
5	Fabio Parra (COL)	Amaya Seguros	+ 2' 36"
6	Raúl Alcalá (MEX)	PDM–Concorde–Ultima	+ 3' 27"
7	Pello Ruiz Cabestany (ESP)	CLAS–Cajastur	+ 4' 08"
8	Anselmo Fuerte (ESP)	ONCE	+ 4' 25"
9	Eduardo Chozas (ESP)	ONCE	+ 6' 23"
10	Oliverio Rincón (COL)	Kelme–Ibexpress	+ 6' 39"

== Stage 16 ==
14 May 1991 — Santander to Lagos de Covadonga, 186.6 km (115.9 mi)

Stage 16 result

Rank	Rider	Team	Time
1	Luis Herrera (COL)	Postobón–Manzana–Ryalcao	5h 26' 56"
2	Piotr Ugrumov (URS)	Seur–Otero	+ 58"
3	Marino Lejarreta (ESP)	ONCE	+ 1' 00"
4	Federico Echave (ESP)	CLAS–Cajastur	s.t.
5	Miguel Induráin (ESP)	Banesto	s.t.
6	Oliverio Rincón (COL)	Kelme–Ibexpress	+ 1' 03"
7	Melcior Mauri (ESP)	ONCE	+ 1' 28"
8	Steven Rooks (NED)	Buckler–Colnago–Decca	s.t.
9	Fabio Parra (COL)	Amaya Seguros	+ 1' 33"
10	Laudelino Cubino (ESP)	Amaya Seguros	+ 1' 50"

General classification after Stage 16

Rank	Rider	Team	Time
1	Melcior Mauri (ESP)	ONCE	63h 36' 52"
2	Marino Lejarreta (ESP)	ONCE	+ 1' 15"
3	Federico Echave (ESP)	CLAS–Cajastur	+ 1' 48"
4	Miguel Induráin (ESP)	Banesto	+ 2' 05"
5	Fabio Parra (COL)	Amaya Seguros	+ 2' 41"
6	Raúl Alcalá (MEX)	PDM–Concorde–Ultima	+ 4' 38"
7	Pello Ruiz Cabestany (ESP)	CLAS–Cajastur	+ 4' 43"
8	Oliverio Rincón (COL)	Kelme–Ibexpress	+ 6' 14"
9	Piotr Ugrumov (URS)	Seur–Otero	+ 7' 43"
10	Luis Herrera (COL)	Postobón–Manzana–Ryalcao	+ 8' 24"

== Stage 17 ==
15 May 1991 — Cangas de Onís to Alto del Naranco, 152 km (94 mi)

Stage 17 result

Rank	Rider	Team	Time
1	Laudelino Cubino (ESP)	Amaya Seguros	4h 06' 00"
2	Marino Lejarreta (ESP)	ONCE	+ 3"
3	Luis Herrera (COL)	Postobón–Manzana–Ryalcao	+ 8"
4	Piotr Ugrumov (URS)	Seur–Otero	+ 13"
5	Miguel Induráin (ESP)	Banesto	s.t.
6	Federico Echave (ESP)	CLAS–Cajastur	s.t.
7	Steven Rooks (NED)	Buckler–Colnago–Decca	+ 21"
8	Pello Ruiz Cabestany (ESP)	CLAS–Cajastur	s.t.
9	Raúl Alcalá (MEX)	PDM–Concorde–Ultima	s.t.
10	Fabio Parra (COL)	Amaya Seguros	s.t.

General classification after Stage 17

Rank	Rider	Team	Time
1	Melcior Mauri (ESP)	ONCE	67h 43' 24"
2	Marino Lejarreta (ESP)	ONCE	+ 46"
3	Federico Echave (ESP)	CLAS–Cajastur	+ 1' 29"
4	Miguel Induráin (ESP)	Banesto	+ 1' 46"
5	Fabio Parra (COL)	Amaya Seguros	+ 2' 30"
6	Raúl Alcalá (MEX)	PDM–Concorde–Ultima	+ 4' 27"
7	Pello Ruiz Cabestany (ESP)	CLAS–Cajastur	+ 4' 32"
8	Oliverio Rincón (COL)	Kelme–Ibexpress	+ 7' 03"
9	Piotr Ugrumov (URS)	Seur–Otero	+ 7' 19"
10	Luis Herrera (COL)	Postobón–Manzana–Ryalcao	+ 8' 00"

== Stage 18 ==
16 May 1991 — León to Valladolid, 137.5 km (85.4 mi)

Stage 18 result

Rank	Rider	Team	Time
1	Antonio Miguel Díaz (ESP)	Kelme–Ibexpress	3h 11' 42"
2	Mario Kummer (GER)	Chateau d'Ax–Gatorade	+ 1"
3	Jean-Paul van Poppel (NED)	PDM–Concorde–Ultima	+ 8"
4	Uwe Raab (GER)	PDM–Concorde–Ultima	s.t.
5	Giovanni Fidanza (ITA)	Chateau d'Ax–Gatorade	s.t.
6	Jesper Skibby (DEN)	TVM–Sanyo	s.t.
7	Adri van der Poel (NED)	Tulip Computers	s.t.
8	Acácio da Silva (POR)	Lotus–Festina	s.t.
9	Alfonso Gutiérrez (ESP)	Paternina-Don Zoilo	s.t.
10	Mathieu Hermans (NED)	Lotus–Festina	s.t.

General classification after Stage 18

Rank	Rider	Team	Time
1	Melcior Mauri (ESP)	ONCE	70h 55' 14"
2	Marino Lejarreta (ESP)	ONCE	+ 46"
3	Federico Echave (ESP)	CLAS–Cajastur	+ 1' 29"
4	Miguel Induráin (ESP)	Banesto	+ 1' 46"
5	Fabio Parra (COL)	Amaya Seguros	+ 2' 30"
6	Raúl Alcalá (MEX)	PDM–Concorde–Ultima	+ 4' 27"
7	Pello Ruiz Cabestany (ESP)	CLAS–Cajastur	+ 4' 32"
8	Oliverio Rincón (COL)	Kelme–Ibexpress	+ 7' 03"
9	Piotr Ugrumov (URS)	Seur–Otero	+ 7' 19"
10	Luis Herrera (COL)	Postobón–Manzana–Ryalcao	+ 8' 00"

== Stage 19 ==
17 May 1991 — Valladolid to Valladolid, 53.2 km (33.1 mi) (ITT)

Stage 19 result

Rank	Rider	Team	Time
1	Melcior Mauri (ESP)	ONCE	1h 06' 15"
2	Miguel Induráin (ESP)	Banesto	+ 1' 06"
3	Eric Vanderaerden (NED)	Buckler–Colnago–Decca	+ 1' 36"
4	Guido Bontempi (ITA)	Carrera Jeans–Tassoni	+ 2' 14"
5	Pello Ruiz Cabestany (ESP)	CLAS–Cajastur	+ 2' 18"
6	Federico Echave (ESP)	CLAS–Cajastur	+ 2' 25"
7	Marino Lejarreta (ESP)	ONCE	s.t.
8	Raúl Alcalá (MEX)	PDM–Concorde–Ultima	+ 2' 30"
9	Tom Cordes (NED)	PDM–Concorde–Ultima	s.t.
10	Alberto Leanizbarrutia (ESP)	CLAS–Cajastur	+ 2' 35"

General classification after Stage 19

Rank	Rider	Team	Time
1	Melcior Mauri (ESP)	ONCE	72h 01' 29"
2	Miguel Induráin (ESP)	Banesto	+ 2' 52"
3	Marino Lejarreta (ESP)	ONCE	+ 3' 11"
4	Federico Echave (ESP)	CLAS–Cajastur	+ 3' 54"
5	Fabio Parra (COL)	Amaya Seguros	+ 5' 38"
6	Pello Ruiz Cabestany (ESP)	CLAS–Cajastur	+ 6' 50"
7	Raúl Alcalá (MEX)	PDM–Concorde–Ultima	+ 6' 57"
8	Piotr Ugrumov (URS)	Seur–Otero	+ 10' 43"
9	Steven Rooks (NED)	Buckler–Colnago–Decca	+ 12' 09"
10	Oliverio Rincón (COL)	Kelme–Ibexpress	+ 12' 11"

== Stage 20 ==
18 May 1991 — Palazuelos de Eresma to Palazuelos de Eresma, 212.7 km (132.2 mi)

Stage 20 result

Rank	Rider	Team	Time
1	Jesús Montoya (ESP)	Amaya Seguros	6h 01' 27"
2	Iñaki Gastón (ESP)	CLAS–Cajastur	s.t.
3	Néstor Mora (COL)	Kelme–Ibexpress	s.t.
4	Udo Bölts (GER)	Team Telekom	s.t.
5	Gerrit de Vries (NED)	Buckler–Colnago–Decca	s.t.
6	Jon Unzaga (ESP)	Seur–Otero	s.t.
7	Malcolm Elliott (GBR)	Seur–Otero	+ 6"
8	Pello Ruiz Cabestany (ESP)	CLAS–Cajastur	s.t.
9	Steven Rooks (NED)	Buckler–Colnago–Decca	s.t.
10	José Pedrero (ESP)	Puertas Mavisa	s.t.

General classification after Stage 20

Rank	Rider	Team	Time
1	Melcior Mauri (ESP)	ONCE	78h 03' 02"
2	Miguel Induráin (ESP)	Banesto	+ 2' 52"
3	Marino Lejarreta (ESP)	ONCE	+ 3' 11"
4	Federico Echave (ESP)	CLAS–Cajastur	+ 3' 54"
5	Fabio Parra (COL)	Amaya Seguros	+ 5' 38"
6	Pello Ruiz Cabestany (ESP)	CLAS–Cajastur	+ 6' 50"
7	Raúl Alcalá (MEX)	PDM–Concorde–Ultima	+ 6' 57"
8	Piotr Ugrumov (URS)	Seur–Otero	+ 10' 43"
9	Steven Rooks (NED)	Buckler–Colnago–Decca	+ 12' 09"
10	Oliverio Rincón (COL)	Kelme–Ibexpress	+ 12' 11"

== Stage 21 ==
19 May 1991 — Collado Villalba to Madrid, 169.6 km (105.4 mi)

Stage 21 result

Rank	Rider	Team	Time
1	Jean-Paul van Poppel (NED)	PDM–Concorde–Ultima	4h 45' 05"
2	Giovanni Fidanza (ITA)	Chateau d'Ax–Gatorade	s.t.
3	Mathieu Hermans (NED)	Lotus–Festina	s.t.
4	Uwe Raab (GER)	PDM–Concorde–Ultima	s.t.
5	Eric Vanderaerden (NED)	Buckler–Colnago–Decca	s.t.
6	Malcolm Elliott (GBR)	Seur–Otero	s.t.
7	Alfonso Gutiérrez (ESP)	Paternina-Don Zoilo	s.t.
8	Adri van der Poel (NED)	Tulip Computers	s.t.
9	Guido Bontempi (ITA)	Carrera Jeans–Tassoni	s.t.
10	Christian Henn (GER)	Carrera Jeans–Tassoni	s.t.

General classification after Stage 21

Rank	Rider	Team	Time
1	Melcior Mauri (ESP)	ONCE	82h 48' 07"
2	Miguel Induráin (ESP)	Banesto	+ 2' 52"
3	Marino Lejarreta (ESP)	ONCE	+ 3' 11"
4	Federico Echave (ESP)	CLAS–Cajastur	+ 3' 54"
5	Fabio Parra (COL)	Amaya Seguros	+ 5' 38"
6	Pello Ruiz Cabestany (ESP)	CLAS–Cajastur	+ 6' 50"
7	Raúl Alcalá (MEX)	PDM–Concorde–Ultima	+ 6' 57"
8	Piotr Ugrumov (URS)	Seur–Otero	+ 10' 43"
9	Steven Rooks (NED)	Buckler–Colnago–Decca	+ 12' 09"
10	Oliverio Rincón (COL)	Kelme–Ibexpress	+ 12' 11"
