= 1994 Volta a la Comunitat Valenciana =

Race details
- Dates: 22–27 February 1994
- Stages: 6
- Winning time: 24h 34' 06"

Results
	Winner	Viatcheslav Ekimov (RUS)	(WordPerfect–Colnago–Decca)
	Second	Miguel Induráin (ESP)	(Banesto)
	Third	Tony Rominger (SUI)	(Mapei–CLAS)

The 1994 Volta a la Comunitat Valenciana was the 52nd edition of the Volta a la Comunitat Valenciana road cycling stage race, which was held from 22 February to 27 February 1994. The race started in Calpe and finished in Valencia. The race was won by Viatcheslav Ekimov of the WordPerfect–Colnago–Decca team.

== General classification ==
Final general classification

Rank	Rider	Team	Time
1	Viatcheslav Ekimov (RUS)	WordPerfect–Colnago–Decca	23h 03' 51"
2	Miguel Induráin (ESP)	Banesto	+ 10"
3	Tony Rominger (SUI)	Mapei–CLAS	+ 11"
4	Melcior Mauri (ESP)	Banesto	+ 20"
5	Guido Bontempi (ITA)	Gewiss–Ballan	+ 32"
6	Herminio Díaz Zabala (ESP)	ONCE	+ 53"
7	Adriano Baffi (ITA)	Mercatone Uno–Medeghini	+ 54"
8	Alex Zülle (SUI)	ONCE	s.t.
9	Raúl Alcalá (MEX)	Motorola	+ 55"
10	Beat Zberg (SUI)	Carrera Jeans–Tassoni	+ 1' 05"
