= 1992 Volta a la Comunitat Valenciana =

Race details
- Dates: 18–23 February 1992
- Stages: 5
- Winning time: 17h 30' 52"

Results
| | Winner | Melcior Mauri (ESP) | (ONCE) |
| | Second | Erik Breukink (NED) | (PDM–Ultima–Concorde) |
| | Third | Andrea Chiurato (ITA) | (Gatorade–Chateau d'Ax) |

The 1992 Volta a la Comunitat Valenciana was the 50th edition of the Volta a la Comunitat Valenciana road cycling stage race, which was held from 18 February to 23 February 1992. The race started in Jávea and finished in Valencia. The race was won by Melcior Mauri of the ONCE team.

== General classification ==
Final general classification

| Rank | Rider | Team | Time |
|---|---|---|---|
| 1 | Melcior Mauri (ESP) | ONCE | 17h 30' 52" |
| 2 | Erik Breukink (NED) | PDM–Ultima–Concorde | + 10" |
| 3 | Andrea Chiurato (ITA) | Gatorade–Chateau d'Ax | + 13" |
| 4 | Johan Museeuw (BEL) | Lotto–Mavic–MBK | + 20" |
| 5 | Luca Gelfi (ITA) | GB–MG Maglificio | + 21" |
| 6 | Herminio Díaz Zabala (ESP) | ONCE | + 26" |
| 7 | Johan Bruyneel (BEL) | ONCE | + 27" |
| 8 | John Talen (NED) | PDM–Ultima–Concorde | + 29" |
| 9 | Francisco Antequera (ESP) | Amaya Seguros | + 39" |
| 10 | Laurent Jalabert (FRA) | ONCE | + 43" |
