= Memorial Manuel Galera =

Single-day road bicycle race

Race details
- Region: Province of Granada, Spain
- Discipline: Road race
- Type: One-day race

History
- First edition: 1972
- Editions: 33
- Final edition: 2004
- First winner: Esteban García Roldán (ESP)
- Final winner: Luis Pasamontes (ESP)

Memorial Manuel Galera was a single-day road bicycle race held annually in the Province of Granada, Spain from 1972 until 2004. From 1972 to 1979, the race was reserved for amateurs. The race was named in honor of Manuel Galera, a Spanish cyclist who died during the 1972 Vuelta a Andalucía.

== Winners ==
Amateur editions highlighted in yellow.

Year	Winner	Second	Third
1972	(Spain) Esteban García Roldán	(Spain) Ramón Guerrero Pozas	(Spain) José Domínguez Pérez
1973	(Spain) Ramón Guerrero Pozas	(Spain) Juan Cantero López	(Spain) Alfonso Vílchez García
1974	(Spain) Francisco Martín Peregrín	(Spain) Juan José Ariza Neri	(Spain) José López Iglesias
1975	(Spain) Juán Cantero López	(Spain) Enrique Bayo	(Spain) Enrique Guerrero
1976	(Spain) Juán Cantero López	(Spain) Ramón Guerrero Pozas	(Spain) Jorge Díaz Aguado
1977	(Spain) Juán Enrique Bayo	(Spain)	(Spain)
1978	(Spain) Francisco Martín Peregrín	(Spain) Juán Cantero López	(Spain) Juán Enrique Bayo
1979	(Spain) Miguel Ángel Fernández Vico	(Spain) Jesús Gómez Vergara	(Spain) José Luis Blanco
1980	(Spain) Ángel Arroyo	(Spain) Enrique Aja	(Spain) Jesús Manzaneque
1981	(Spain) Juan Fernández Martín	(Spain) Ángel Ocaña	(Spain) Enrique Martínez Heredia
1982	(Spain) Jesús Guzmán	(Spain) Francisco Albelda	(Spain) Ignacio Fandos
1983	(Spain) Jesús Guzmán	(Spain) José Recio	(Spain) Ángel Arroyo
1984	(Spain) José Luis Navarro	(Spain) Jerónimo Ibáñez	(Spain) José María González Barcala
1985	(Spain) Ángel Ocaña	(Spain) Francisco Espinosa	(Spain) José Luis Laguía
1986	(Spain) Vicente Ridaura	(Spain) Francisco Espinosa	(Spain) Eduardo Chozas
1987	(Spain) Juan Martínez Oliver	(Spain) Francisco Espinosa	(Spain) Roque de la Cruz
1988	(Spain) Miguel Ángel Martínez Torres	(Spain) Pedro Delgado	(Spain) Juan Martínez Oliver
1989	(Spain) Jesús Cruz Martín	(Spain) Arturo Geriz	(Spain) Pedro Delgado
1990	(Spain) Jesús Blanco Villar	(Spain) Jesús Cruz Martín	(Spain) Antonio Miguel Díaz
1991	(Soviet Union) Viktor Klimov	(Soviet Union) Oleg Petrovich Chuzhda	(Spain) Enrique Aja
1992	(Spain) Francisco Cabello	(Spain) José Luis Rodríguez García	(Spain) Rafael Ruiz Erencia
1993	(Australia) Stephen Hodge	(Spain) José María Jiménez	(Ukraine) Viktor Klimov
1994	(Spain) José María Jiménez	(Spain) Pedro Delgado	(Spain) Ignacio García Camacho
1995	(Spain) Ignacio García Camacho	(Russia) Asiat Saitov	(Spain) José Antonio Espinosa
1996	(Spain) Inaki Ayarzaguena	(Spain) José Vicente García Acosta	(Spain) Francisco Cabello
1997	(Spain) Pablo Lastras	(Spain) Eladio Jiménez	(Spain) Txema del Olmo
1998	(Spain) Iñigo González de Heredia	(Spain) Francisco Javier Cerezo	(Spain) Aitor Kintana
1999	(Spain) Juan Carlos Vicario	(Spain) Manuel Beltrán	(Spain) Juan Miguel Mercado
2000	(Spain) Óscar Sevilla	(United States) David Clinger	(Spain) José Enrique Gutiérrez
2001	(Spain) Pablo Lastras	(Spain) César García Calvo	(Russia) Borislav Vladislav
2002	(Spain) Carlos García Quesada	(Spain) Manuel Beltrán	(Spain) Antonio Tauler
2003	(Spain) Pedro Díaz Lobato	(Spain) Francisco Mancebo	(Spain) David Navas
2004	(Spain) Luis Pasamontes	(Spain) José Antonio López	(Spain) Koldo Fernández
