= Andrea Chiurato =

Italian cyclist

Personal information
- Full name: Andrea Chiurato
- Born: 7 February 1965 (age 61) Montebelluna, Italy

Cycling career
- Sport: Cycling
- Current team: Retired
- Discipline: Road
- Role: Rider

Professional teams
- 1989–1991: Polli–Mobiexport
- 1992–1993: Gatorade–Chateau d'Ax
- 1994–1995: Mapei–CLAS
- 1996: Roslotto–ZG Mobili
- 1997: Batik–Del Monte
- 1998: Mobilvetta Design–Northwave
Medal record
Representing Italy
Men's road bicycle racing
World Championships
Silver medal – second place	1994 Catania	Elite Men's Time Trial

Andrea Chiurato (born 7 February 1965 in Montebelluna) is an Italian former road bicycle racer.

== Major results ==
1989
1st Stage 14 Herald Sun Tour
4th Trofeo Pantalica
9th Trofeo Laigueglia
1990
8th Coppa Sabatini
9th Overall Giro di Calabria

1st Stage 1

10th Giro di Toscana
1991
2nd Firenze–Pistoia
3rd Overall Vuelta a Aragón
9th Gran Premio Industria e Commercio di Prato
1992
3rd Overall Volta a la Comunitat Valenciana
4th Overall Tirreno–Adriatico
5th Firenze–Pistoia
1993
4th Overall Tirreno–Adriatico
4th Overall Herald Sun Tour
5th La Flèche Wallonne
1994
1st Gran Premio di Lugano
Herald Sun Tour

1st Stages 4 & 11

2nd Time trial, UCI Road World Championships
2nd Trofeo Laigueglia
3rd Grand Prix Eddy Merckx
4th Overall Tour DuPont
10th Grand Prix des Nations
1995
1st Grand Prix de Wallonie
1st Telekom Grand Prix (with Tony Rominger)
Vuelta a Asturias

1st Stages 2 & 3

2nd Time trial, National Road Championships
4th Grand Prix Eddy Merckx
1996
6th Trofeo Luis Puig
7th Overall Tour de Luxembourg
1998
7th Overall Course de Solidarność et des Champions Olympiques

=== Grand Tours general classification results timeline ===
Grand Tour	1989	1990	1991	1992	1993	1994	1995	1996	1997	1998
/ Vuelta a España	—	—	—	DNF	—	—	—	—	—	—
Giro d'Italia	—	32	DNF	—	DNF	45	DNF	—	—	—
Tour de France	—	—	—	112	—	—	—	—	—	—

Legend
—	Did not compete
DNF	Did not finish
