= Scirea =

Scirea is an Italian surname. Notable people with the surname include:

- Gaetano Scirea (1953–1989), Italian footballer
- Mariella Cavanna Scirea (born 1949), Italian politician
- Mario Scirea (born 1964), Italian cyclist
