= Mario Scirea =

Italian cyclist

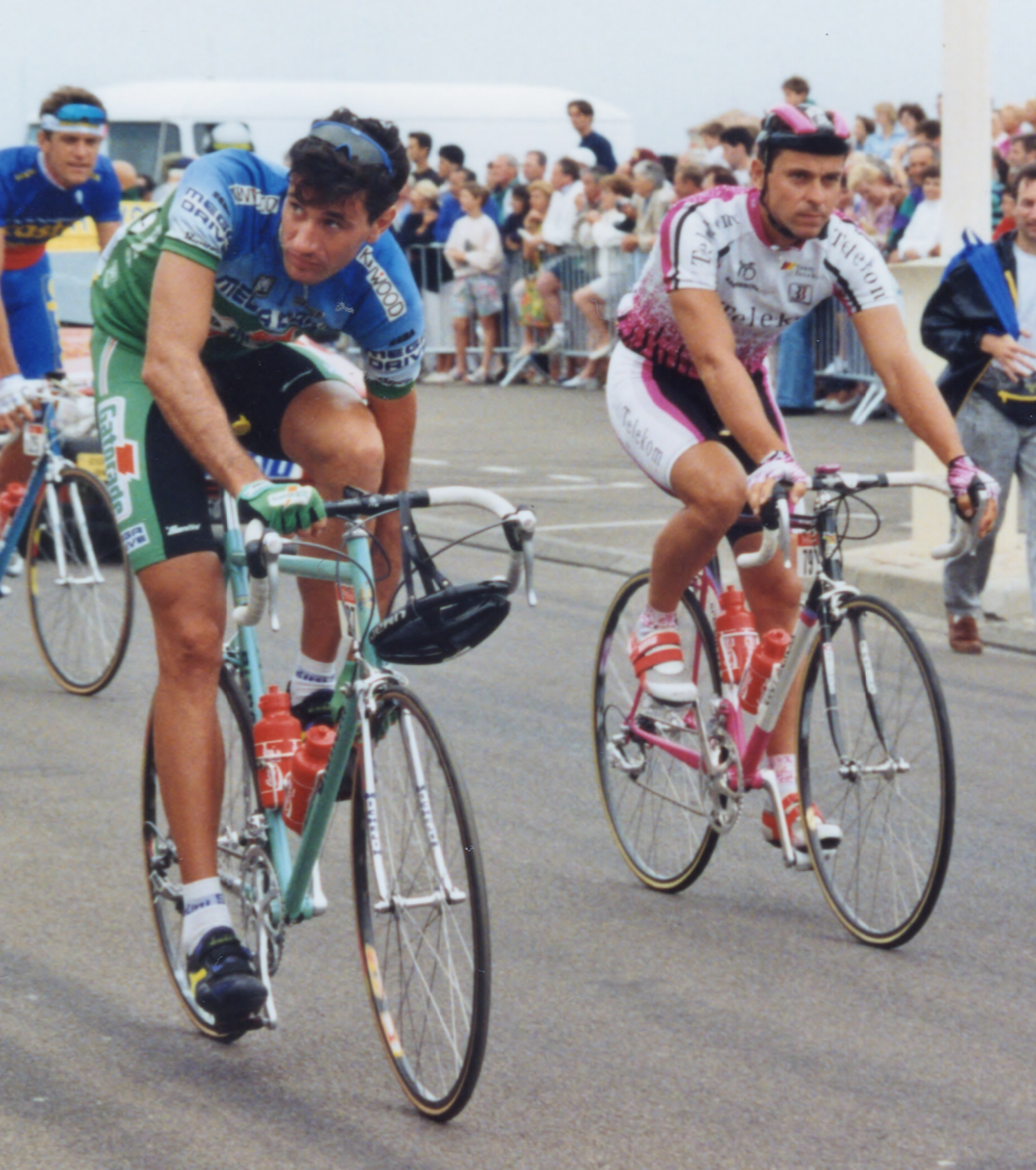

Personal information
- Born: 7 August 1964 (age 62) Oltre il Colle, Italy

Cycling career
- Sport: Cycling
- Current team: Retired
- Discipline: Road
- Role: Rider

Professional teams
- 1989: Café de Colombia
- 1990–1993: Chateau d'Ax–Salotti
- 1994–1995: Team Polti–Vaporetto
- 1996–2001: Saeco–AS Juvenes San Marino
- 2002: Acqua & Sapone
- 2003–2004: Domina Vacanze–Elitron

Mario Scirea (Italian pronunciation: [ˈmaːrjo ʃʃiˈrɛːa]; born 7 August 1964) is an Italian former racing cyclist.

== Career ==
Scirea was a professional for 15 years, riding with six different teams throughout his career. He rode in 29 Grand Tours between 1989 and 2004. He also rode in the team time trial event at the 1988 Summer Olympics. From 1996 until the end of his career in 2004, he rode with Mario Cipollini and was a key member of Cipollini's legendary sprint train.

Scirea's only major victory was in 1987, when he won the World Time Trial Team Championships with teammates Roberto Fortunato, Eros Poli and Flavio Vanzella. He also finished second in the same event the previous year.

His only notable win as a professional was stage two of the Hofbrau Cup in 1996.

== Major results ==
1986
2nd World Time Trial Team Championships
1987
1st World Time Trial Team Championships (with Roberto Fortunato, Eros Poli and Flavio Vanzella)
1996
1st Stage 2 Hofbrau Cup

=== Grand Tour general classification results timeline ===
Grand Tour	1989	1990	1991	1992	1993	1994	1995	1996	1997	1998	1999	2000	2001	2002	2003	2004
Giro d'Italia	131	—	105	—	115	85	102	95	DNF	61	67	56	121	109	84	121
Tour de France	DNF	—	—	107	120	DNF	98	DNF	—	DNF	DNF	DNF	—	—	—	—
Vuelta a España	—	117	106	112	—	—	DNF	—	113	—	—	—	—	DNF	—	—

Legend
—	Did not compete
DNF	Did not finish
