= 1994 Vuelta a Murcia =

Race details
- Dates: 8–13 March 1994
- Stages: 5 + Prologue
- Distance: 693.1 km (430.7 mi)
- Winning time: 17h 52' 02"

Results
	Winner	Melcior Mauri (ESP)
	Second	Aitor Garmendia (ESP)
	Third	Herminio Díaz Zabala (ESP)

The 1994 Vuelta a Murcia was the tenth edition of the Vuelta a Murcia cycle race and was held on 8 March to 13 March 1994. The race started in La Manga and finished in Murcia. The race was won by Melcior Mauri.

== General classification ==
Final general classification

Rank	Rider	Time
1	Melcior Mauri (ESP)	17h 52' 02"
2	Aitor Garmendia (ESP)	+ 23"
3	Herminio Díaz Zabala (ESP)	+ 31"
4	Andrea Noè (ITA)	+ 38"
5	Mariano Rojas (ESP)	+ 40"
6	Álvaro Mejía (COL)	+ 41"
7	Pedro Delgado (ESP)	+ 51"
8	Manuel Pascual (ESP)	+ 1' 02"
9	Pavel Tonkov (RUS)	+ 1' 03"
10	Alberto Camargo (COL)	+ 1' 05"
