= Iñigo González de Heredia =

Spanish cyclist

Personal information
- Full name: Iñigo González de Heredia Aranzábal
- Born: 15 March 1971 (age 55) Gasteiz, Spain

Cycling career
- Sport: Cycling
- Discipline: Road
- Role: Rider

Professional teams
- 1994–1997: Euskadi–Petronor
- 1998–1999: Vitalicio Seguros

Iñigo González de Heredia Aranzábal (born 15 March 1971 in Gasteiz) is a Spanish former professional racing cyclist. He participated three times in a Grand Tour, but only finished the 1995 Vuelta a Espana, where he finished in 70th place.

== Major results ==
1991
3rd Vuelta a Zamora
1996
1st Time trial, National Road Championships
1997
1st Stage 1b (TTT) Vuelta a La Rioja
1998
1st Memorial Manuel Galera
