= 1991 Tirreno–Adriatico =

Race details
- Dates: 13–20 March 1991
- Stages: 8
- Distance: 1,317 km (818.3 mi)
- Winning time: 35h 12' 46"

Results
	Winner	Herminio Díaz Zabala (ESP)	(ONCE)
	Second	Federico Ghiotto (ITA)	(Ariostea)
	Third	Raúl Alcalá (MEX)	(PDM–Concorde–Ultima)

The 1991 Tirreno–Adriatico was the 26th edition of the Tirreno–Adriatico cycle race and was held from 13 March to 20 March 1991. The race started in Pompei and finished in San Benedetto del Tronto. The race was won by Herminio Díaz Zabala of the ONCE team.

== General classification ==
Final general classification

Rank	Rider	Team	Time
1	Herminio Díaz Zabala (ESP)	ONCE	35h 12' 46"
2	Federico Ghiotto (ITA)	Ariostea	+ 4"
3	Raúl Alcalá (MEX)	PDM–Concorde–Ultima	+ 52"
4	Thomas Wegmüller (SUI)	Weinmann–EVS	+ 52"
5	Maarten den Bakker (NED)	PDM–Concorde–Ultima	+ 2' 01"
6	Jesper Skibby (DEN)	TVM–Sanyo	+ 2' 45"
7	Gérard Rué (FRA)	Helvetia–La Suisse	+ 2' 45"
8	Giuseppe Petito (ITA)	Gis Gelati–Ballan	+ 3' 22"
9	Scott Sunderland (AUS)	TVM–Sanyo	+ 3' 32"
10	Luc Leblanc (FRA)	Castorama–Raleigh	+ 3' 35"
