= Fabio Hernán Rodríguez =

Personal information
- Full name: Fabio Hernán Rodríguez Hernández
- Born: 21 September 1966 (age 60) Cogua, Colombia

Cycling career
- Sport: Cycling
- Current team: Retired
- Discipline: Road
- Role: Rider

Professional teams
- 1989–1991: Pony Malta–Avianca
- 1992–1993: CLAS–Cajastur
- 1994: Mapei–CLAS
- 1995–1996: ZG Mobili–Selle Italia

Fabio Hernán Rodríguez Hernández (born 21 September 1966 in Cogua) is a Colombian former professional road cyclist. He most notably won the Vuelta a los Valles Mineros in 1993 and the Clásico RCN in 1991.

== Major results ==
1989
5th Overall Vuelta a Colombia
5th Overall Clásico RCN
1991
1st Overall Clásico RCN
1993
1st Overall Vuelta a los Valles Mineros
1994
5th GP Industria & Artigianato
1995
10th Overall Vuelta a Colombia

=== Grand Tour general classification results timeline ===
Grand Tour	1990	1991	1992	1993
Giro d'Italia	—	—	—	—
Tour de France	—	—	—	—
Vuelta a España	DNF	—	21	44
