= José Luis Villanueva Orihuela =

Spanish cyclist

Personal information
- Born: 28 April 1965 (age 61)

Cycling career
- Sport: Cycling
- Role: Rider

José Luis Villanueva Orihuela (born 28 April 1965) is a Spanish former racing cyclist. He rode in the 1991 Tour de France.
