= Jesús Cruz Martín =

Spanish cyclist (born 1963)

Personal information
- Full name: Jesús Cruz Martín Pérez
- Born: 14 November 1963 (age 62) Vertavillo, Spain

Cycling career
- Sport: Cycling
- Discipline: Road
- Role: Rider

Professional teams
- 1986–1987: Zor–BH
- 1988: CLAS
- 1989: ONCE
- 1990: Banesto
- 1991–1992: Wigarma–JM Catering

Major wins
- Grand Tours Vuelta a España 1 individual stage (1991)

Jesús Cruz Martín Pérez (born 14 November 1963) is a Spanish former racing cyclist. Professional from 1986 to 1992, he won a stage of the 1991 Vuelta a España.

== Major results ==
1986 (1 pro win)
1st Stage 3 Vuelta a los Valles Mineros
1987
3rd Clásica a los Puertos de Guadarrama
1989 (1)
1st Memorial Manuel Galera
1990
2nd Memorial Manuel Galera
1991 (2)
1st Stage 4 Vuelta a España
1st Stage 13 Vuelta y Ruta de Mexico
