= Antonio Miguel Díaz =

Spanish cyclist (born 1968)

Personal information
- Full name: Antonio Miguel Díaz Rodríguez
- Born: 24 August 1968 (age 58) Alhendin, Spain

Cycling career
- Sport: Cycling
- Current team: Retired
- Discipline: Road
- Role: Rider

Professional teams
- 1990–1993: Kelme–Ibexpress
- 1994–1996: Deportpublic

Antonio Miguel Díaz Rodríguez (born 24 August 1968 in Alhendin) is a Spanish former cyclist.

== Career achievements ==
=== Major results ===
1986
1st Road race, National Junior Road Championships
1991
1st Stage 18 Vuelta a España
4th Overall Vuelta a Aragón
1993
1st Stage 6 Volta a Portugal

=== Grand Tour general classification results timeline ===
Grand Tour	1990	1991	1992	1993	1994	1995	1996
Giro d'Italia	—	—	—	—	—	—	DNF
Tour de France	138	—	—	—	—	—	—
Vuelta a España	—	78	67	41	81	—	—
