= José Luis Santamaría =

Spanish footballer

Personal information
- Full name: José Luis Santamaría Buitrago
- Date of birth: 14 January 1973 (age 53)
- Place of birth: Madrid, Spain
- Height: 1.78 m (5 ft 10 in)
- Position: Defender

Youth career
- Real Madrid

Senior career*
Years	Team	Apps	(Gls)
1992–1995	Real Madrid B	61	(0)
1995–2004	Valladolid	165	(1)
Total		226	(1)
- * Club domestic league appearances and goals

José Luis Santamaría Buitrago (born 14 January 1973) is a Spanish former professional footballer who played mainly as a central defender.

== Club career ==
After unsuccessfully rising through the ranks of Real Madrid, Madrid-born Santamaría joined Real Valladolid for the 1995–96 campaign, appearing in 41 La Liga matches in his second season and subsequently becoming an essential defensive player. For three years, he often partnered another Real Madrid youth product in the back-four, José García Calvo.

From 2000 to 2004, however, a bad run with injuries and subsequent loss of form limited Santamaría to just 18 games (none in his last year), and he retired in June 2004 with 185 competitive appearances for the Castile and León club. His only goal as a professional and in the top flight occurred on 1 March 1998, when he opened a 2–1 home win against CD Tenerife.

== Personal life ==
Santamaría was nicknamed "Funny One" during his playing career, due to his love for books.
