= Francisco Espinosa (cyclist) =

Spanish cyclist (born 1962)

Personal information
- Born: 7 May 1962 (age 64) Granada, Spain

Cycling career
- Sport: Cycling
- Role: Rider

Francisco Espinosa (born 7 May 1962) is a Spanish former professional racing cyclist. He rode in the Tour de France and Giro d'Italia. He won 4 races (in 1989 Volta a Portugal | 13º Etapa, in 1989 Volta a Portugal | 2º Etapa, in 1988 Vuelta a Aragón | 1º Etapa, and 1986 at Vuelta a Castilla y León | 8º Etapa)
