= Roberto Torres (cyclist) =

Spanish cyclist

Personal information
- Born: 29 August 1964 (age 62) Montpellier, France

Cycling career
- Sport: Cycling
- Role: Rider

Professional teams
- 1987: Zahor Chocolates
- 1989–1995: Lotus–Zahor

Roberto Torres (born 29 August 1964) is a Spanish former professional racing cyclist. He rode in one edition of the Tour de France, one edition of the Giro d'Italia and nine editions of the Vuelta a España.

== Major results ==
1987
2nd Overall Vuelta a los Valles Mineros
1989
2nd Overall Vuelta a Aragón

1st Stage 4

1990
1st Overall Tour d'Armorique

1st Stage 2

1st Stage 3a ITT Route du Sud
1991
1st Stage 2 Volta ao Alentejo
6th Overall GP du Midi-Libre
1992
1st Stage 13 Vuelta a España
1993
1st Stage 5a Vuelta a la Comunidad Valenciana
