= 1991 Vuelta a España =

Race details
- Dates: 29 April – 19 May
- Stages: 21, including one split stage
- Distance: 3,215.5 km (1,998 mi)
- Winning time: 82h 48' 07"

Results
Jersey awarded to the overall winner	Winner	Melcior Mauri (ESP)	(ONCE)
	Second	Miguel Induráin (ESP)	(Banesto)
	Third	Marino Lejarreta (ESP)	(ONCE)
Jersey awarded to the points classification winner	Points	Uwe Raab (GER)	(PDM)
Jersey awarded to the mountains classification winner	Mountains	Luis Herrera (COL)	(Ryalcao Postobón)
Jersey awarded to the youth classification winner	Youth	Oliverio Rincón (COL)	(Kelme–CAM)
Jersey awarded to the combination classification winner	Combination	Federico Echave (ESP)	(CLAS–Cajastur)
Jersey awarded to the sprints classification winner	Sprints	Miguel Ángel Iglesias (ESP)	(Puertas Mavisa)
	Team	ONCE	

The 46th Edition Vuelta a España (Tour of Spain), a long-distance bicycle stage race and one of the three grand tours, was held from 29 April to 19 May 1991. It consisted of 21 stages covering a total of 3,215.5 km (1,998 mi), and was won by Melcior Mauri of the ONCE cycling team.

== Race preview and favorites ==
Miguel Induráin, Laudelino Cubino and Anselmo Fuerte were the Spanish favourites for the race. Defending champion Marco Giovannetti was also a favourite together with Steven Rooks, Raúl Alcalá and the Colombians Fabio Parra and Luis ‘Lucho’ Herrera.

In the end Melcior Mauri was the revelation of the race and beat the future winner of the Tour de France Miguel Induráin in all the time trials. Indurain was forced to ride an aggressive race in the mountain stages but Mauri was able to defend his lead.

== Route and stages ==
Stages and winners
Stage	Date	Course	Distance	Type	Winner
1	29 April	Mérida (Note: The opening stage was competed as a three-man time trial.)	8.8 km (5 mi)	Team time trial	Melcior Mauri (ESP)
2a	30 April	Mérida to Cáceres	134.5 km (84 mi)		Michel Zanoli (NED)
2b	30 April	Montijo to Badajoz	40.4 km (25 mi)	Team time trial	ONCE (ESP)
3	1 May	Badajoz to Seville	233.2 km (145 mi)		Jesper Skibby (DEN)
4	2 May	Seville to Jaén	292 km (181 mi)		Jesus Cruz Martin (ESP)
5	3 May	Linares to Albacete	227.8 km (142 mi)		Uwe Raab (GER)
6	4 May	Albacete to Valencia	236.5 km (147 mi)		Jean-Paul van Poppel (NED)
7	5 May	Palma de Mallorca	188 km (117 mi)		Jesper Skibby (DEN)
8	6 May	Cala d'Or	47 km (29 mi)	Individual time trial	Melcior Mauri (ESP)
9	7 May	Sant Cugat del Vallès to Lloret de Mar	140 km (87 mi)		Jean-Paul van Poppel (NED)
10	8 May	Lloret de Mar to Andorra la Vella, Andorra	229 km (142 mi)		Guido Bontempi (ITA)
11	9 May	~~Andorra la Vella, Andorra to Pla-de-Beret~~	~~134.5 km (84 mi)~~	Mountain stage	Stage cancelled
12	10 May	Bossòst to Cerler	111 km (69 mi)		Ivan Ivanov (URS)
13	11 May	Benasque to Zaragoza	219 km (136 mi)		Jean-Paul van Poppel (NED)
14	12 May	Ezcaray to Valdezcaray	24.1 km (15 mi)	Individual time trial	Fabio Parra (COL)
15	13 May	Santo Domingo de la Calzada to Santander	219.5 km (136 mi)		Guido Bontempi (ITA)
16	14 May	Santander to Lagos de Covadonga	186.6 km (116 mi)		Luis Herrera (COL)
17	15 May	Cangas de Onís to Alto del Naranco	152 km (94 mi)		Laudelino Cubino (ESP)
18	16 May	León to Valladolid	137.5 km (85 mi)		Antonio Miguel Díaz (ESP)
19	17 May	Valladolid	53.2 km (33 mi)	Individual time trial	Melcior Mauri (ESP)
20	18 May	Palazuelos de Eresma	212.7 km (132 mi)		Jesús Montoya (ESP)
21	19 May	Collado Villalba to Madrid	169.6 km (105 mi)		Jean-Paul van Poppel (NED)

== Race overview ==
The opening stage consisted, on this occasion, of a three-man team time trial. The winning trio consisted of ONCE's Melcior Mauri, Anselmo Fuerte and Herminio Díaz-Zabala. Coupled with ONCE's win in the following day's Team Time Trial, meant the leader's jersey alternated between these three riders for the first week of the race. The team time trial would turn out to have a large impact as Induráin lost almost two minutes to Mauri on this stage.

Stage 8, a 47 km (29 mi) individual time trial, was the first decisive stage of the Vuelta. Riders such as Laudelino Cubino and Anselmo Fuerte lost most of their chances that day. Mauri increased his lead by winning the stage, a little less than a minute ahead of Induráin.

The Pyrenean stages were awaited with anticipation, to see if ONCE's Catalunyan rider would be capable of withstanding the high mountains. However, the queen stage ending at Pla de Beret had to be suspended due to adverse weather. Russian rider Ivan Ivanov won the 12th stage to the mountaintop ski resort at Cerler, but Mauri held on, losing less than a minute to Induráin.

Stage 14 was a mountain time trial finishing at the ski station in Valdezcaray, where Parra and Herrera set the leading times. Mauri once again put in a good performance, gaining more time on Induráin and leading the general classification ahead of his teammate Lejarreta, Echave and Induráin.

The third and final week of the race featured two high mountain stages in the Cordillera Cantábrica mountain range: the historic ascensions to the Alto del Naranco and the Covadonga Lakes. Herrera and Cubino took the stages, but Mauri managed to hang on. Mauri lost some time, but not enough to lose his overall lead. At this point he was the leader and there was still one time trial to go.

Mauri didn't disappoint, winning the Valladolid time trial ahead of Induráin by over a minute to seal his Vuelta win. He would never again perform at such a high standard. Induráin finished second overall, and Lejarreta third.

== Results ==
=== Final General Classification ===
Rank	Rider	Team	Time
1	(Spain) Melcior Mauri	ONCE	82h 48' 07s
2	(Spain) Miguel Induráin	Banesto	a 2' 52s
3	(Spain) Marino Lejarreta	ONCE	a 3' 11s
4	(Spain) Federico Echave	CLAS–Cajastur	a 3' 54s
5	(Colombia) Fabio Parra	Amaya Seguros	a 5' 38s
6	(Spain) Pello Ruiz Cabestany	CLAS–Cajastur	a 6' 50s
7	(Mexico) Raúl Alcalá	PDM–Concorde	a 6' 57s
8	(Latvia) Piotr Ugrumov	Seur	a 10' 43s
9	(Netherlands) Steven Rooks	Buckler	a 12' 09s
10	(Colombia) Oliverio Rincón	Kelme	a 12' 11s
11	(Spain) Eduardo Chozas	ONCE	
12	(Netherlands) Tom Cordes	PDM–Ultima–Concorde	
13	(Colombia) Luis Herrera	Ryalco–Postobón	
14	(Spain) Ignacio Gaston Crespo	CLAS–Cajastur	
15	(Spain) Laudelino Cubino Gonzalez	Amaya	
16	(Spain) Jon Unzaga Bombín	Seur	
17	(Germany) Udo Bölts	Telekom-Mercedes-Merckx	
18	(Italy) Marco Giovannetti	Gatorade-Chateau d'Ax	
19	(Soviet Union) Ivan Ivanov	Seur	
20	(Spain) Fernando Martinez De Guerenu	Puertas Mavisa	
21	(Spain) Francisco Javier Mauleón	CLAS–Cajastur	
22	(Colombia) Alvaro Meija Castrillon	Ryalco–Postobón	
23	(Spain) Jesus Montoya Alarcon	Amaya	
24	(France) Fabrice Philipot	Banesto	
25	(Colombia) Gerardo Moncada	Ryalco–Postobón	
