= Herminio Díaz Zabala =

Spanish cyclist (born 1964)

Personal information
- Born: 12 December 1964 (age 61) Reocín, Spain

Cycling career
- Sport: Cycling
- Discipline: Road
- Role: Rider

Professional teams
- 1986: Teka
- 1987–1988: Reynolds
- 1989–1998: ONCE

Managerial team
- 2004–2006: Liberty Seguros

Major wins
- Grand Tours Vuelta a España 1 individual stage (1989) 1 TTT stage (1991) Stage races Tirreno–Adriatico (1991)

Herminio Díaz Zabala (born 12 December 1964) is a Spanish former professional racing cyclist. He rode in nine editions of the Tour de France, one edition of the Giro d'Italia and nine editions of the Vuelta a España. His brother Pedro also competed as a professional cyclist.

== Major results ==
1987
1st Stage 4b Vuelta a Cantabria
1988
1st Stage 5b Vuelta a Cantabria
1989
1st Stage 10 Vuelta a España
1991
1st Overall Tirreno–Adriatico
1st Stage 2b (TTT) Vuelta a España
1st Stage 1 (TTT) Volta a Catalunya
10th Grand Prix La Marseillaise
1992
3rd Overall Vuelta a Andalucía
1994
3rd Overall Vuelta a Murcia

1st Stage 2

6th Overall Volta a la Comunitat Valenciana
1996
2nd Overall Vuelta a La Rioja
1997
7th Overall Volta ao Alentejo
8th Subida al Naranco
1998
4th Overall Volta a la Comunitat Valenciana

=== Grand Tour general classification results timeline ===
Grand Tour	1988	1989	1990	1991	1992	1993	1994	1995	1996	1997	1998
Giro d'Italia	—	—	78	—	—	—	—	—	—	—	—
Tour de France	118	—	90	75	97	102	109	35	53	—	DNF
Vuelta a España	—	110	—	42	51	54	63	58	63	68	72

Legend
—	Did not compete
DNF	Did not finish
