= Francisco Javier Mauleón =

Spanish cyclist (born 1965)

Personal information
- Full name: Francisco Javier Mauleón Unsuain
- Born: 16 September 1965 (age 61) Vitoria-Gasteiz, Spain

Cycling career
- Sport: Cycling
- Current team: Retired
- Discipline: Road
- Role: Rider

Professional teams
- 1988: Kas–Canal 10
- 1989–1993: CLAS
- 1994–1996: Mapei–CLAS
- 1997–1998: ONCE

Francisco Javier Mauleón (born 16 September 1965) is a Spanish former professional racing cyclist. He rode in six editions of the Tour de France, two editions of the Giro d'Italia and seven editions of the Vuelta a España.

== Major results ==
1987
1st Overall Circuito Montañés
1st Overall Cinturó de l'Empordà
1988
1st Overall Vuelta a Aragón
1989
1st Stage 3 Vuelta a Burgos
1990
2nd National Road Race Championships
3rd Overall Euskal Bizikleta
1992
2nd Subida al Naranco
9th Overall Vuelta a España

1st Stage 15

1996
1st Subida al Naranco
1997
2nd Overall Volta ao Alentejo
