= Raúl Alcalá =

Mexican cyclist (born 1964)

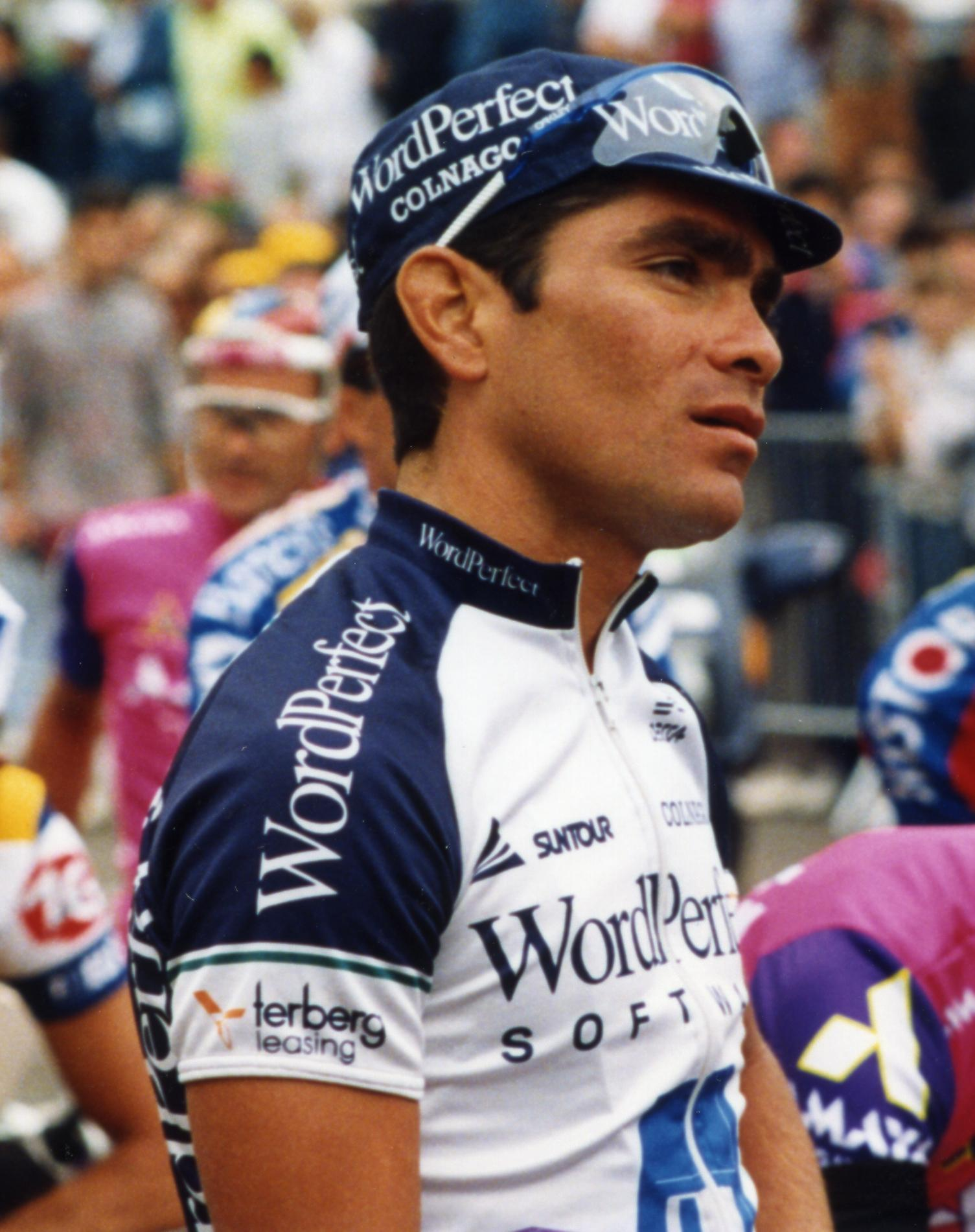
- Alcalá at the 1993 Tour de France

Personal information
- Full name: Raúl Alcalá Gallegos
- Nickname: The Goblin (El Duende)
- Born: 3 March 1964 (age 62) Monterrey, Mexico

Cycling career
- Sport: Cycling
- Discipline: Road
- Role: Rider

Professional teams
- 1985: Denti–Valtron
- 1986–1988: 7-Eleven
- 1989–1992: PDM–Ultima–Concorde
- 1993: WordPerfect–Colnago–Decca
- 1994: Motorola
- 1998: Team GT
- 2009: Team Arreola Hnos.
- 2010: Canel's Turbo

Major wins
- Grand Tours Tour de France Young rider classification (1987) 2 individual stages (1989, 1990) One-day races and Classics National Time Trial Championships (2010) Clásica de San Sebastián (1992)

Raúl Alcalá Gallegos (born 3 March 1964) is a Mexican former professional road racing cyclist, who competed between 1985 and 1999 and again in 2008 and 2010. As an amateur, Alcalá competed in the 1984 Summer Olympics in Los Angeles, finishing in eleventh place and 17th with his team in the 100 km team time trial. In 1986, Alcalá became the first Mexican cyclist to compete in the Tour de France. In the 1987 Tour de France, he won the young rider classification. In both 1989 and 1990, he won a stage in the Tour de France and finished in 8th place. A capable General Classification rider Alcalá finished in the top 10 during five different Grand Tours. In 2008, Alcalá returned to professional racing by competing in the Vuelta Chihuahua. In 2010, he won the national time trial championship at the age of 46. In early 2011, he stated his intention to race at the 2011 Pan American Games, but eventually did not compete.

== Career achievements ==
=== Major results ===
1984
9th Overall Coors Classic
1985
3rd Overall Redlands Classic
1986
2nd Overall Redlands Classic

1st Prologue

9th Overall Coors Classic

1st Stage 6

1987
1st Overall Coors Classic

1st Prologue, Stages 1 & 13

2nd Züri-Metzgete
5th Overall Giro del Trentino

1st Stage 1

9th Overall Tour de France

1st Young rider classification

1988
8th Clásica de San Sebastián
1989
1st Overall Ruta Mexico

1st Points classification
1st Stages 10, 11, 14 & 15

4th Giro di Lombardia
5th Züri-Metzgete
5th Grand Prix de la Libération
7th Overall Setmana Catalana de Ciclisme
8th Overall Tour de France

1st Stage 3

9th Overall Volta a Catalunya

1st Stage 2b (TTT)

9th UCI Road World Cup
1990
1st Overall Ruta Mexico

1st Points classification
1st Stages 7 & 14

1st Overall Tour de Trump

1st Prologue & Stage 8 (ITT)

1st Overall Vuelta a Asturias

1st Prologue

3rd Overall Setmana Catalana de Ciclisme
5th Overall Tour of Ireland
8th Overall Tour de France

1st Stage 7 (ITT)

8th Overall Tour of the Basque Country
8th La Flèche Wallonne
1991
1st Stage 5 Tour of the Basque Country
3rd Overall Tirreno–Adriatico
6th Liège–Bastogne–Liège
7th Overall Vuelta a España
8th Overall Tour of Ireland
1992
1st Clásica de San Sebastián
2nd Overall Tour of the Basque Country
2nd Overall Tirreno–Adriatico
2nd Overall Vuelta a Burgos

1st Mountains classification

2nd Overall Tour of Ireland
3rd Overall Setmana Catalana de Ciclisme

1st Stage 3

4th UCI Road World Cup
4th Giro di Lombardia
6th Wincanton Classic
8th Overall Vuelta a España
1993
1st Overall Tour DuPont

1st Stage 11

2nd Overall Vuelta a Burgos

1st Stage 5

8th Overall Critérium du Dauphiné Libéré

1st Prologue & Stage 3 (ITT)

8th Overall Ronde van Nederland
1994
1st Overall Ruta Mexico

1st Stages 4 (TTT) & 9

3rd Klasika Primavera
7th Overall Setmana Catalana de Ciclisme
9th Overall Volta a la Comunitat Valenciana
9th Overall Tour DuPont

1st Prologue

1999
7th Overall Ruta Mexico
2010
1st Time trial, National Road Championships

=== Grand Tour general classification results timeline ===
| Grand Tour | 1986 | 1987 | 1988 | 1989 | 1990 | 1991 | 1992 | 1993 | 1994 |
|---|---|---|---|---|---|---|---|---|---|
| Vuelta a España | — | — | — | — | — | 7 | 8 | — | — |
| Giro d'Italia | — | — | 14 | — | — | — | — | — | DNF |
| Tour de France | 114 | 9 | 20 | 8 | 8 | DNF | 21 | 27 | 70 |

Legend
| — | Did not compete |
| DNF | Did not finish |
