= Melcior Mauri =

Spanish cyclist

Personal information
- Full name: Melcior Mauri Prat
- Born: 8 April 1966 (age 60) Vic, Spain

Cycling career
- Sport: Cycling
- Discipline: Road
- Role: Rider

Professional teams
- 1987–1989: Reynolds
- 1990–1992: ONCE
- 1993: Amaya Seguros
- 1994: Banesto
- 1995–1998: ONCE
- 1999–2000: Benfica
- 2001–2002: Milaneza–MSS

Major wins
- Grand Tours Vuelta a España General classification (1991) 4 individual stages (1991, 1993, 1997) One-day races and Classics National Time Trial Championships (1995)
Medal record
Men's road bicycle racing
Representing Spain
World Championships
Silver medal – second place	1998 Valkenburg	Elite Men's Time Trial

Melcior Mauri Prat (born 8 April 1966 in Vic) is a Spanish retired cyclist who won the 1991 Vuelta a España, as well as numerous smaller stage races, mainly due to his abilities as a time triallist. He won the silver medal at the time trial World Championship (1998), and was also Spanish national champion in this discipline (1995).

In November 2007 he won the second edition of the Titan Desert mountain bike 5 stage race over 293 km in Morocco.

== Career achievements ==
=== Major results ===
1988
3rd Circuito de Getxo
1990
4th Overall Vuelta a Aragón
7th Overall Volta a la Comunitat Valenciana
1991
1st Overall Vuelta a España

1st Stages 1 (TTT), 8 (ITT) & 19 (ITT)

1st Overall Volta a la Comunitat Valenciana

1st Stage 6

Vuelta a Andalucía

1st Stages 3 & 6

9th Grand Prix des Nations
1992
1st Overall Volta a la Comunitat Valenciana

1st Stage 5b (ITT)

1st Stage 1 Vuelta Ciclista a La Rioja
2nd Overall Tour du Limousin
3rd Overall Vuelta a Murcia

1st Stage 4 (ITT)

9th Grand Prix des Nations
1993
3rd Overall Vuelta a Aragón

1st Stage 6

7th Trofeo Masferrer
8th Overall Vuelta a España

1st Stage 13 (ITT)

1994
1st Overall Vuelta a Castilla y León
1st Overall Vuelta a Murcia
1st Klasika Primavera
2nd Overall Vuelta a Aragón
3rd Overall Tour de Luxembourg
3rd Road race, National Road Championships
1995
National Road Championships

1st Time trial
5th Road race

2nd Overall Volta a Catalunya

1st Stage 6 (ITT)

4th Overall Vuelta a España
6th Overall Tour de France
1996
1st Overall Vuelta a Aragón

1st Stage 4b (ITT)

1st Overall Vuelta a Murcia

1st Stage 5b (ITT)

1st Stage 5b (ITT) Volta a la Comunitat Valenciana
5th Trofeo Luis Puig
6th Road race, Olympic Games
7th Klasika Primavera
10th Overall Setmana Catalana de Ciclisme
1997
1st Overall Circuit de la Sarthe

1st Stage 4 (ITT)

1st Stage 9 (ITT) Vuelta a España
UCI Road World Championships

5th Road race
6th Time trial

7th Overall Setmana Catalana de Ciclisme
8th Overall Escalada a Montjuïc
9th Overall Tour du Limousin
1998
1st Overall Circuit de la Sarthe

1st Stage 4 (ITT)

1st Overall Volta ao Alentejo

1st Stage 5 (ITT)

2nd Time trial, UCI Road World Championships
2nd Time trial, National Road Championships
3rd Overall Escalada a Montjuïc
4th Overall Vuelta a Castilla y León
5th Overall Vuelta a Murcia
8th Overall Grand Prix du Midi Libre

1st Stage 3 (ITT)

1999
1st Overall Volta ao Algarve

1st Stage 4 (ITT)

2nd Overall Escalada a Montjuïc

1st Stage 1b (ITT)

2nd Overall Volta ao Alentejo
3rd Overall Volta a Portugal

1st Stage 13 (ITT)

5th Time trial, UCI Road World Championships
6th Overall Setmana Catalana de Ciclisme
7th Overall Volta a la Comunitat Valenciana
2001
3rd Overall Volta ao Algarve
5th Overall Volta ao Alentejo

==== Grand Tour general classification results timeline ====
Grand Tour	1988	1989	1990	1991	1992	1993	1994	1995	1996	1997	1998	1999	2000	2001	2002
/ Vuelta a España	—	130	71	1	DNF	8	18	4	32	22	35	26	—	120	DNF
Giro d'Italia	98	—	—	—	—	—	—	—	—	—	—	—	—	—	—
Tour de France	—	92	78	64	—	DNF	95	6	38	—	DNF	—	—	—	—

Legend
—	Did not compete
DNF	Did not finish
