= 1992 Vuelta a España =

Race details
- Dates: 27 April – 17 May
- Stages: 20 + Prologue, including one split stage
- Distance: 3,395 km (2,110 mi)
- Winning time: 96h 14' 50"

Results
Jersey awarded to the overall winner	Winner	Tony Rominger (SUI)	(CLAS–Cajastur)
	Second	Jesús Montoya (ESP)	(Amaya Seguros)
	Third	Pedro Delgado (ESP)	(Banesto)
Jersey awarded to the points classification winner	Points	Djamolidine Abdoujaparov (UZB)	(Carrera Jeans–Vagabond)
Jersey awarded to the mountains classification winner	Mountains	Carlos Hernández Bailo (ESP)	(Lotus–Festina)
Jersey awarded to the youth classification winner	Youth	Artūras Kasputis (LIT)	(Postobón–Manzana–Ryalcao)
Jersey awarded to the combination classification winner	Combination	Tony Rominger (SUI)	(CLAS–Cajastur)
Jersey awarded to the sprints classification winner	Sprints	Antonio Esparza (ESP)	(Wigarma)
	Team	Amaya Seguros	

The 47th Edition Vuelta a España (Tour of Spain), a long-distance bicycle stage race and one of the three grand tours, was held from 27 April to 17 May 1992. It consisted of 20 stages covering a total of 3,395 km (2,110 mi), and was won by Tony Rominger of the Clas-Cajastur cycling team.

== Race preview and favorites ==
Among the starters in Jerez de la Frontera were such big names as Erik Breukink, Robert Millar, Steven Rooks and Stephen Roche. However, none of them seemed to arrive in good form, and none of them lived up to their reputation. Among the locals, the defending champion Melchor Mauri, Pedro Delgado and Laudelino Cubino were the favorites.

== Route ==
List of stages
Stage	Date	Course	Distance	Type	Winner
1	27 April	Jerez de la Frontera to Jerez de la Frontera	9.2 km (6 mi)	Individual time trial	Jelle Nijdam (NED)
2a	28 April	San Fernando to Jerez de la Frontera	135.5 km (84 mi)		Djamolidine Abdoujaparov (UZB)
2b	28 April	Arcos de la Frontera to Jerez de la Frontera	32.6 km (20 mi)	Team time trial	Gatorade–Chateau d'Ax
3	29 April	Jerez de la Frontera to Córdoba	205 km (127 mi)		Jean-Paul van Poppel (NED)
4	30 April	Linares to Albacete	229 km (142 mi)		Djamolidine Abdoujaparov (UZB)
5	1 May	Albacete to Gandia	213.5 km (133 mi)		Jean-Paul van Poppel (NED)
6	2 May	Gandia to Benicàssim	202.8 km (126 mi)		Edwig Van Hooydonck (BEL)
7	3 May	Alquerías del Niño Perdido to Oropesa	49.5 km (31 mi)	Individual time trial	Erik Breukink (NED)
8	4 May	Lleida to Pla de Beret	240.5 km (149 mi)		Jon Unzaga (ESP)
9	5 May	Vielha to Luz Ardiden (France)	144 km (89 mi)		Laudelino Cubino (ESP)
10	6 May	Luz-Saint-Sauveur (France) to Sabiñánigo	196 km (122 mi)		Julio César Cadena (COL)
11	7 May	Sabiñánigo to Pamplona	162.9 km (101 mi)		Djamolidine Abdoujaparov (UZB)
12	8 May	Pamplona to Burgos	200.1 km (124 mi)		Johan Bruyneel (BEL)
13	9 May	Burgos to Santander	178.3 km (111 mi)		Roberto Torres (ESP)
14	10 May	Santander to Lakes of Covadonga	213.4 km (133 mi)		Pedro Delgado (ESP)
15	11 May	Cangas de Onís to Alto del Naranco	163 km (101 mi)		Francisco Javier Mauleón (ESP)
16	12 May	Oviedo to León	162 km (101 mi)		Tom Cordes (NED)
17	13 May	León to Salamanca	200.6 km (125 mi)		Eric Vanderaerden (BEL)
18	14 May	Salamanca to Ávila	218.9 km (136 mi)		Enrico Zaina (ITA)
19	15 May	Fuenlabrada to Fuenlabrada	37.9 km (24 mi)	Individual time trial	Tony Rominger (SUI)
20	16 May	Collado Villalba to Palazuelos de Eresma (Destilerías DYC)	188.3 km (117 mi)		~~Óscar Vargas~~; Tony Rominger (SUI)
21	17 May	Palazuelos de Eresma (Destilerías DYC) to Madrid	175 km (109 mi)		Djamolidine Abdoujaparov (UZB)
	Total		3,395 km (2,110 mi)		

== Race overview ==
The first decisive stage was the first individual time trial, won by Dutch rider Erik Breukink. The big surprise that day was pure climber Jesús Montoya who managed second on the stage and took the leader's jersey. Rominger, suffering from a concussion and a knee injury due to an earlier crash, lost almost three minutes.

Two days later, during the queen stage in the Pyrenees, with 5 major mountain passes ending with the ascensions of the Tourmalet and Luz Ardiden, the names of the contenders became clear, as Mauri lost over forty minutes and Rominger dropped the other contenders on the final climb, to finish second to the stage winner Lale Cubino who had spent the day in a breakaway. Cubino, who until then seemed like a candidate for the overall win, lost time on the ascension of Lagos de Covadonga, where Delgado took the stage and rose to second overall. Montoya limited his losses to Delgado, and Rominger finished right with him after being initially dropped.

As Montoya and Delgado closely marked each other's attacks, they were unable to increase their advantage on Rominger who took the lead with a commanding performance in the final flat time trial. After this, Montoya and Delgado joined forces over the final mountain stage, but were unable to unseat Rominger who once again won the stage.

Thus, Rominger became the first Swiss rider to win the Vuelta. He was joined on the final podium by Jesús Montoya and Pedro Delgado.

=== Doping ===
Óscar Vargas initially won stage 20, but tested positive for caffeine in the subsequent doping test. He was stripped of his result and given a three-month suspension.

== Results ==
=== Final General Classification ===
Rank	Rider	Team	Time
1	(Switzerland) Tony Rominger	CLAS-Cajastur	96h 14' 50"
2	(Spain) Jesús Montoya	Amaya Seguros	1' 04"
3	(Spain) Pedro Delgado	Banesto	1' 42"
4	(Italy) Marco Giovannetti	Gatorade – Chateau D'ax	5' 19"
5	(Spain) Federico Echave	CLAS-Cajastur	5' 34"
6	(Spain) Laudelino Cubino	Amaya Seguros	6' 24"
7	(Colombia) Fabio Parra	Amaya Seguros	7' 24"
8	(Mexico) Raúl Alcalá	PDM-Concorde	12' 50"
9	(Spain) Francisco Javier Mauleón	CLAS-Cajastur	15' 44"
10	(Netherlands) Steven Rooks	Buckler	18' 57"
11	(Netherlands) Gert-Jan Theunisse	TVM-Sanyo	19' 39"
12	(Spain) Pello Ruiz Cabestany	Gatorada-Chateaux d'Ax	19' 41"
13	(Colombia) Luis Camargo	Ryalco–Postobón	
14	(Republic of Ireland) Stephen Roche	Carrera Jeans–Vagabond	
15	(Belgium) Johan Bruyneel	ONCE	
16	(Colombia) Hernán Buenahora	Kelme-Don Café	
17	(Colombia) William Palacio	Ryalco-Postobón	
18	(Latvia) Piotr Ugrumov	Seur	
19	(Colombia) Edgar Corredor	Sicasal-Arcal	
20	(United Kingdom) Robert Millar	TVM-Sanyo	
21	(Colombia) Fabio Rodríguez	Clas-Cajastur	
22	(Spain) Carlos Hernández Bailo	Lotus-Festina	
23	(Spain) Jon Unzaga Bombín	Clas-Cajastur	
24	(Spain) Arsenio González	Clas-Cajastur	
25	(Spain) Luis Perez Garcia	Lotus-Festina	
