= List of teams and cyclists in the 1993 Vuelta a España =

For the 1993 Vuelta a España, the field consisted of 169 riders; 114 finished the race.

== By rider ==
Legend
No.	Starting number worn by the rider during the Vuelta
Pos.	Position in the general classification
Time	Deficit to the winner of the general classification
DNF	Denotes a rider who did not finish

No.	Name	Nationality	Team	Pos.	Time	Ref
1	Tony Rominger	Switzerland	CLAS–Cajastur	1	96h 07' 03"	
2	Federico Echave	Spain	CLAS–Cajastur	24	+ 43' 37"	
3	Fernando Escartín	Spain	CLAS–Cajastur	10	+ 23' 27"	
4	Francisco Espinosa	Spain	CLAS–Cajastur	75	+ 2h 14' 14"	
5	Iñaki Gastón	Spain	CLAS–Cajastur	11	+ 27' 45"	
6	Arsenio González	Spain	CLAS–Cajastur	23	+ 43' 16"	
7	Francisco Javier Mauleón	Spain	CLAS–Cajastur	20	+ 41' 06"	
8	Fabio Hernán Rodríguez	Colombia	CLAS–Cajastur	44	+ 1h 26' 15"	
9	José Roberto Sierra	Spain	CLAS–Cajastur	47	+ 1h 31' 19"	
10	Jon Unzaga	Spain	CLAS–Cajastur	18	+ 37' 11"	
11	Jesús Montoya	Spain	Amaya Seguros	5	+ 10' 27"	
12	Melcior Mauri	Spain	Amaya Seguros	8	+ 19' 53"	
13	Laudelino Cubino	Spain	Amaya Seguros	3	+ 8' 54"	
14	Javier Murguialday	Spain	Amaya Seguros	16	+ 34' 59"	
15	Tom Cordes	Netherlands	Amaya Seguros	53	+ 1h 40' 39"	
16	Oliverio Rincón	Colombia	Amaya Seguros	4	+ 9' 25"	
17	Antonio Sánchez García	Spain	Amaya Seguros	86	+ 2h 28' 45"	
18	Fernando Quevedo	Spain	Amaya Seguros	49	+ 1h 33' 14"	
19	Vicente Aparicio	Spain	Amaya Seguros	34	+ 1h 05' 41"	
20	Mikel Zarrabeitia	Spain	Amaya Seguros	12	+ 28' 25"	
21	Pedro Delgado	Spain	Banesto	6	+ 11' 17"	
22	Marino Alonso	Spain	Banesto	21	+ 41' 47"	
23	Jean-François Bernard	France	Banesto	DNF	—	
24	Armand de Las Cuevas	France	Banesto	DNF	—	
25	José Luis de Santos	Spain	Banesto	31	+ 1h 03' 59"	
26	Aitor Garmendia	Spain	Banesto	DNF	—	
27	Julián Gorospe	Spain	Banesto	29	+ 57' 39"	
28	Roberto Lezaun	Spain	Banesto	72	+ 2h 12' 03"	
29	José Luis Santamaría	Spain	Banesto	61	+ 1h 58' 08"	
30	José Ramón Uriarte	Spain	Banesto	17	+ 37' 05"	
31	Jean-Paul van Poppel	Netherlands	Festina–Lotus	110	+ 2h 55' 00"	
32	Thierry Marie	France	Festina–Lotus	109	+ 2h 52' 17"	
33	Gert Jakobs	Netherlands	Festina–Lotus	112	+ 3h 10' 19"	
34	Roberto Torres	Spain	Festina–Lotus	79	+ 2h 19' 39"	
35	Luis Pérez García	Spain	Festina–Lotus	27	+ 48' 34"	
36	Ramón González Arrieta	Spain	Festina–Lotus	60	+ 1h 58' 04"	
37	Romes Gainetdinov	Russia	Festina–Lotus	32	+ 1h 04' 23"	
38	Harald Maier	Austria	Festina–Lotus	DNF	—	
39	Fernando Piñero	Spain	Festina–Lotus	84	+ 2h 28' 06"	
40	Martin Earley	Ireland	Festina–Lotus	DNF	—	
41	Djamolidine Abdoujaparov	Uzbekistan	Lampre–Polti	63	+ 2h 04' 13"	
42	Marco Lietti	Italy	Lampre–Polti	70	+ 2h 09' 48"	
43	Acácio da Silva	Portugal	Lampre–Polti	64	+ 2h 04' 34"	
44	Zbigniew Spruch	Poland	Lampre–Polti	46	+ 1h 30' 25"	
45	Davide Bramati	Italy	Lampre–Polti	94	+ 2h 36' 19"	
46	Serguei Outschakov	Ukraine	Lampre–Polti	50	+ 1h 34' 22"	
47	Marek Szerszyński	Poland	Lampre–Polti	83	+ 2h 26' 44"	
48	Stefano Cortinovis	Italy	Lampre–Polti	DNF	—	
49	Mirco Gualdi	Italy	Lampre–Polti	DNF	—	
50	Giovanni Lombardi	Italy	Lampre–Polti	DNF	—	
51	Flavio Giupponi	Italy	Mercatone Uno–Zucchini–Medeghini	DNF	—	
52	Bruno Leali	Italy	Mercatone Uno–Zucchini–Medeghini	51	+ 1h 35' 03"	
53	Fabio Bordonali	Italy	Mercatone Uno–Zucchini–Medeghini	77	+ 2h 14' 42"	
54	Adriano Baffi	Italy	Mercatone Uno–Zucchini–Medeghini	90	+ 2h 30' 10"	
55	Germano Pierdomenico	Italy	Mercatone Uno–Zucchini–Medeghini	DNF	—	
56	Roberto Pelliconi	Italy	Mercatone Uno–Zucchini–Medeghini	58	+ 1h 55' 43"	
57	Massimo Donati	Italy	Mercatone Uno–Zucchini–Medeghini	DNF	—	
58	Angelo Lecchi	Italy	Mercatone Uno–Zucchini–Medeghini	DNF	—	
59	Antonio Politano	Italy	Mercatone Uno–Zucchini–Medeghini	52	+ 1h 37' 57"	
60	Enrico Zaina	Italy	Mercatone Uno–Zucchini–Medeghini	39	+ 1h 21' 19"	
61	Eduardo Chozas	Spain	Artiach–Filipinos–Chiquilin	22	+ 41' 56"	
62	Alberto Camargo	Colombia	Artiach–Filipinos–Chiquilin	DNF	—	
63	Luis Espinosa	Colombia	Artiach–Filipinos–Chiquilin	DNF	—	
64	Félix García Casas	Spain	Artiach–Filipinos–Chiquilin	80	+ 2h 20' 29"	
65	Álvaro González de Galdeano	Spain	Artiach–Filipinos–Chiquilin	DNF	—	
66	Alfonso Gutiérrez	Spain	Artiach–Filipinos–Chiquilin	89	+ 2h 30' 00"	
67	Carmelo Miranda	Spain	Artiach–Filipinos–Chiquilin	56	+ 1h 51' 50"	
68	Erwin Nijboer	Netherlands	Artiach–Filipinos–Chiquilin	111	+ 2h 56' 58"	
69	Manuel Pascual	Spain	Artiach–Filipinos–Chiquilin	93	+ 2h 32' 21"	
70	Orlando Rodrigues	Portugal	Artiach–Filipinos–Chiquilin	76	+ 2h 14' 27"	
71	Jesús Blanco Villar	Spain	Deportpublic	25	+ 47' 06"	
72	Carlos Galarreta	Spain	Deportpublic	78	+ 2h 19' 29"	
73	Viktor Rjaksinski	Ukraine	Deportpublic	82	+ 2h 22' 44"	
74	Viktor Klimov	Ukraine	Deportpublic	36	+ 1h 14' 24"	
75	José Rodríguez	Spain	Deportpublic	67	+ 2h 06' 33"	
76	Eleuterio Anguita	Spain	Deportpublic	65	+ 2h 04' 58"	
77	Alfredo Irusta Sampedro	Spain	Deportpublic	69	+ 2h 09' 19"	
78	Federico García Meliá	Spain	Deportpublic	30	+ 59' 18"	
79	José Antonio Espinosa Hernández	Spain	Deportpublic	114	+ 3h 51' 21"	
80	Ivan Ivanov	Russia	Deportpublic	DNF	—	
81	Anselmo Fuerte	Spain	Kelme–Xacobeo	45	+ 1h 27' 43"	
82	Hernán Buenahora	Colombia	Kelme–Xacobeo	13	+ 31' 24"	
83	Ángel Edo	Spain	Kelme–Xacobeo	73	+ 2h 12' 21"	
84	José Martín Farfán	Colombia	Kelme–Xacobeo	40	+ 1h 24' 00"	
85	Ignacio García Camacho	Spain	Kelme–Xacobeo	106	+ 2h 47' 43"	
86	Asiat Saitov	Russia	Kelme–Xacobeo	59	+ 1h 57' 58"	
87	José Ángel Vidal	Spain	Kelme–Xacobeo	81	+ 2h 22' 03"	
88	Ángel Camargo	Colombia	Kelme–Xacobeo	DNF	—	
89	Néstor Mora	Colombia	Kelme–Xacobeo	33	+ 1h 05' 36"	
90	Antonio Miguel Díaz Rodríguez	Spain	Kelme–Xacobeo	41	+ 1h 24' 13"	
91	Erik Breukink	Netherlands	ONCE	7	+ 17' 18"	
92	Johan Bruyneel	Belgium	ONCE	9	+ 20' 01"	
93	Herminio Díaz Zabala	Spain	ONCE	54	+ 1h 44' 28"	
94	Laurent Dufaux	Switzerland	ONCE	37	+ 1h 19' 35"	
95	Stephen Hodge	Australia	ONCE	85	+ 2h 28' 32"	
96	Laurent Jalabert	France	ONCE	35	+ 1h 13' 05"	
97	Alberto Leanizbarrutia	Spain	ONCE	66	+ 2h 05' 15"	
98	Miguel Ángel Martínez	Spain	ONCE	38	+ 1h 19' 53"	
99	Luis María Díaz De Otazu	Spain	ONCE	88	+ 2h 29' 41"	
100	Alex Zülle	Switzerland	ONCE	2	+ 29"	
101	Hendrik Redant	Belgium	Collstrop–Assur Carpets	97	+ 2h 39' 17"	
102	Marc Bouillon	Belgium	Collstrop–Assur Carpets	DNF	—	
103	Johnny Dauwe	Belgium	Collstrop–Assur Carpets	102	+ 2h 44' 11"	
104	Klaus De Muynck	Belgium	Collstrop–Assur Carpets	DNF	—	
105	Patrick Evenepoel	Belgium	Collstrop–Assur Carpets	113	+ 3h 14' 51"	
106	Jan Goessens	Belgium	Collstrop–Assur Carpets	100	+ 2h 42' 14"	
107	Danny In 't Ven	Belgium	Collstrop–Assur Carpets	95	+ 2h 37' 53"	
108	Peter Verbeken	Belgium	Collstrop–Assur Carpets	105	+ 2h 47' 00"	
109	Willy Willems	Belgium	Collstrop–Assur Carpets	101	+ 2h 43' 36"	
111	Marco Giovannetti	Italy	Eldor–Viner	DNF	—	
112	Santos Hernández	Spain	Eldor–Viner	43	+ 1h 25' 39"	
113	Juan Carlos González Salvador	Spain	Eldor–Viner	DNF	—	
114	Fabrizio Bontempi	Italy	Eldor–Viner	96	+ 2h 39' 08"	
115	Mauro Consonni	Italy	Eldor–Viner	108	+ 2h 48' 53"	
116	Luca Gelfi	Italy	Eldor–Viner	14	+ 34' 44"	
117	Dario Nicoletti	Italy	Eldor–Viner	99	+ 2h 41' 48"	
118	Andrea Noè	Italy	Eldor–Viner	68	+ 2h 06' 42"	
119	Andrey Teteryuk	Kazakhstan	Eldor–Viner	104	+ 2h 46' 18"	
120	Gianluca Tonetti	Italy	Eldor–Viner	57	+ 1h 53' 53"	
121	José Fabio Moreno Guerrero	Colombia	Gaseosas Glacial	DNF	—	
122	Rubén Darío Beltrán Pérez	Colombia	Gaseosas Glacial	DNF	—	
123	Demetrio Cuspoca Fonseca	Colombia	Gaseosas Glacial	DNF	—	
124	Luis Alberto González	Colombia	Gaseosas Glacial	DNF	—	
125	Armando Moreno Guerrero	Colombia	Gaseosas Glacial	DNF	—	
126	Israel Ochoa	Colombia	Gaseosas Glacial	DNF	—	
127	Álvaro Sierra	Colombia	Gaseosas Glacial	DNF	—	
128	Julio César Rangel	Colombia	Gaseosas Glacial	DNF	—	
129	Miguel Ángel Sanabria	Colombia	Gaseosas Glacial	DNF	—	
130	Santiago Amador	Colombia	Gaseosas Glacial	DNF	—	
131	Massimo Podenzana	Italy	Navigare–Blue Storm	74	+ 2h 14' 11"	
132	Michele Coppolillo	Italy	Navigare–Blue Storm	DNF	—	
133	Stefano Zanini	Italy	Navigare–Blue Storm	91	+ 2h 31' 16"	
134	Fabiano Fontanelli	Italy	Navigare–Blue Storm	DNF	—	
135	Roberto Pagnin	Italy	Navigare–Blue Storm	DNF	—	
136	Giuseppe Guerini	Italy	Navigare–Blue Storm	DNF	—	
137	Luboš Lom	Czech Republic	Navigare–Blue Storm	DNF	—	
138	Walter Castignola	Italy	Navigare–Blue Storm	DNF	—	
139	Vassili Davidenko	Georgia	Navigare–Blue Storm	DNF	—	
140	Fabrizio Settembrini	Italy	Navigare–Blue Storm	98	+ 2h 41' 45"	
141	Juan Tomás Martínez	Spain	Sicasal–Acral	42	+ 1h 25' 36"	
142	Arximiro Blanco Costas	Spain	Sicasal–Acral	87	+ 2h 29' 12"	
143	Manuel Cunha	Portugal	Sicasal–Acral	62	+ 2h 01' 58"	
144	Antonio Pinto	Portugal	Sicasal–Acral	DNF	—	
145	Jorge Silva	Portugal	Sicasal–Acral	DNF	—	
146	Pedro Silva	Portugal	Sicasal–Acral	DNF	—	
147	Serafin De Araújo Vieira	Portugal	Sicasal–Acral	28	+ 57' 36"	
148	Manuel Luis Abreu Campos	Portugal	Sicasal–Acral	DNF	—	
149	Joaquim Sampaio	Portugal	Sicasal–Acral	55	+ 1h 47' 53"	
150	Paulo Ferreira	Portugal	Sicasal–Acral	DNF	—	
151	Robert Millar	Great Britain	TVM–Bison Kit	15	+ 34' 52"	
152	Tristan Hoffman	Netherlands	TVM–Bison Kit	103	+ 2h 44' 21"	
153	Scott Sunderland	Australia	TVM–Bison Kit	DNF	—	
154	Gerrit de Vries	Netherlands	TVM–Bison Kit	26	+ 47' 46"	
155	Maarten den Bakker	Netherlands	TVM–Bison Kit	71	+ 2h 10' 56"	
156	Mathieu Hermans	Netherlands	TVM–Bison Kit	DNF	—	
157	Bart Voskamp	Netherlands	TVM–Bison Kit	92	+ 2h 32' 19"	
158	Dag Otto Lauritzen	Norway	TVM–Bison Kit	48	+ 1h 32' 10"	
159	John Talen	Netherlands	TVM–Bison Kit	107	+ 2h 48' 19"	
160	Peter Meinert Nielsen	Denmark	TVM–Bison Kit	19	+ 39' 16"	
161	Christoph Demel	Austria	Varta-Elk-Basso-No	DNF	—	
162	Josef Lontscharitsch	Austria	Varta-Elk-Basso-No	DNF	—	
163	Alois Pfleger	Austria	Varta-Elk-Basso-No	DNF	—	
164	Jozef Regec	Czech Republic	Varta-Elk-Basso-No	DNF	—	
165	Nigel Perry	Great Britain	Varta-Elk-Basso-No	DNF	—	
166	Patrick Schoovaerts	Belgium	Varta-Elk-Basso-No	DNF	—	
167	Uwe Nepp	Germany	Varta-Elk-Basso-No	DNF	—	
168	Paul Popp	Austria	Varta-Elk-Basso-No	DNF	—	
169	Bernhard Rassinger	Austria	Varta-Elk-Basso-No	DNF	—	
170	Robert Matwew	Germany	Varta-Elk-Basso-No	DNF	—	
