= 1993 Vuelta a España, Stage 12 to Stage 21 =

Cycling race stages

The 1993 Vuelta a España was the 48th edition of the Vuelta a España, one of cycling's Grand Tours. The Vuelta began in A Coruña, with an individual time trial on 26 April, and Stage 12 occurred on 7 May with a stage from Benasque. The race finished in Santiago de Compostela on 16 May.

== Stage 12 ==
7 May 1993 — Benasque to Zaragoza, 220.7 km (137.1 mi)

Stage 12 result

Rank	Rider	Team	Time
1	Djamolidine Abdoujaparov (UZB)	Lampre–Polti	5h 58' 52"
2	John Talen (NED)	TVM–Bison Kit	s.t.
3	Jean-Paul van Poppel (NED)	Festina–Lotus	s.t.
4	Adriano Baffi (ITA)	Mercatone Uno–Zucchini–Medeghini	s.t.
5	Alfonso Gutiérrez (ESP)	Artiach–Filipinos–Chiquilin	s.t.
6	Juan Carlos González Salvador (ESP)	Eldor–Viner	s.t.
7	Pedro Silva (POR)	Sicasal–Acral	s.t.
8	Laurent Jalabert (FRA)	ONCE	s.t.
9	Zbigniew Spruch (POL)	Lampre–Polti	s.t.
10	Johnny Dauwe (BEL)	Collstrop–Assur Carpets	s.t.

General classification after Stage 12

Rank	Rider	Team	Time
1	Alex Zülle (SUI)	ONCE	57h 26' 14"
2	Tony Rominger (SUI)	CLAS–Cajastur	+ 18"
3	Laudelino Cubino (ESP)	Amaya Seguros	+ 2' 02"
4	Oliverio Rincón (COL)	Amaya Seguros	+ 3' 36"
5	Marino Alonso (ESP)	Banesto	+ 3' 59"
6	Pedro Delgado (ESP)	Banesto	+ 4' 45"
7	Melcior Mauri (ESP)	Amaya Seguros	+ 4' 48"
8	Jesús Montoya (ESP)	Amaya Seguros	+ 5' 06"
9	Johan Bruyneel (BEL)	ONCE	+ 6' 39"
10	Hernán Buenahora (COL)	Kelme–Xacobeo	+ 7' 33"

== Stage 13 ==
8 May 1993 — Zaragoza to Zaragoza, 37.1 km (23.1 mi) (ITT)

Stage 13 result

Rank	Rider	Team	Time
1	Melcior Mauri (ESP)	Amaya Seguros	44' 56"
2	Tony Rominger (SUI)	CLAS–Cajastur	+ 1"
3	Erik Breukink (NED)	ONCE	+ 7"
4	Marino Alonso (ESP)	Banesto	+ 13"
5	Alex Zülle (SUI)	ONCE	+ 15"
6	Johan Bruyneel (BEL)	ONCE	+ 43"
7	Aitor Garmendia (ESP)	Banesto	+ 55"
8	Jesús Montoya (ESP)	Amaya Seguros	+ 57"
9	Pedro Delgado (ESP)	Banesto	+ 58"
10	Luca Gelfi (ITA)	Eldor–Viner	+ 1' 10"

General classification after Stage 13

Rank	Rider	Team	Time
1	Alex Zülle (SUI)	ONCE	58h 11' 25"
2	Tony Rominger (SUI)	CLAS–Cajastur	+ 4"
3	Laudelino Cubino (ESP)	Amaya Seguros	+ 3' 03"
4	Marino Alonso (ESP)	Banesto	+ 3' 57"
5	Melcior Mauri (ESP)	Amaya Seguros	+ 4' 33"
6	Pedro Delgado (ESP)	Banesto	+ 5' 28"
7	Oliverio Rincón (COL)	Amaya Seguros	+ 5' 37"
8	Jesús Montoya (ESP)	Amaya Seguros	+ 5' 48"
9	Johan Bruyneel (BEL)	ONCE	+ 7' 07"
10	Julián Gorospe (ESP)	Banesto	+ 9' 30"

== Stage 14 ==
9 May 1993 — Tudela to Alto de la Cruz de la Demanda (Ezcaray), 197.2 km (122.5 mi)

Stage 14 result

Rank	Rider	Team	Time
1	Tony Rominger (SUI)	CLAS–Cajastur	4h 46' 45"
2	Alex Zülle (SUI)	ONCE	+ 37"
3	Oliverio Rincón (COL)	Amaya Seguros	+ 41"
4	Laudelino Cubino (ESP)	Amaya Seguros	s.t.
5	Jesús Montoya (ESP)	Amaya Seguros	+ 5"
6	Luca Gelfi (ITA)	Eldor–Viner	+ 1' 25"
7	Mikel Zarrabeitia (ESP)	Amaya Seguros	s.t.
8	Pedro Delgado (ESP)	Banesto	s.t.
9	Iñaki Gastón (ESP)	CLAS–Cajastur	+ 1' 36"
10	Fabio Hernán Rodríguez (COL)	CLAS–Cajastur	+ 1' 43"

General classification after Stage 14

Rank	Rider	Team	Time
1	Tony Rominger (SUI)	CLAS–Cajastur	62h 58' 14"
2	Alex Zülle (SUI)	ONCE	+ 33"
3	Laudelino Cubino (ESP)	Amaya Seguros	+ 3' 40"
4	Oliverio Rincón (COL)	Amaya Seguros	+ 6' 14"
5	Marino Alonso (ESP)	Banesto	+ 6' 24"
6	Jesús Montoya (ESP)	Amaya Seguros	+ 6' 43"
7	Pedro Delgado (ESP)	Banesto	+ 6' 49"
8	Melcior Mauri (ESP)	Amaya Seguros	+ 7' 09"
9	Johan Bruyneel (BEL)	ONCE	+ 10' 21"
10	Erik Breukink (NED)	ONCE	+ 12' 00"

== Stage 15 ==
10 May 1993 — Santo Domingo de la Calzada to Santander, 226.2 km (140.6 mi)

Stage 15 result

Rank	Rider	Team	Time
1	Dag Otto Lauritzen (NOR)	TVM–Bison Kit	5h 49' 15"
2	Laurent Jalabert (FRA)	ONCE	+ 2"
3	Alfonso Gutiérrez (ESP)	Artiach–Filipinos–Chiquilin	s.t.
4	Asiat Saitov (RUS)	Kelme–Xacobeo	s.t.
5	Juan Carlos González Salvador (ESP)	Eldor–Viner	s.t.
6	Eleuterio Anguita (ESP)	Deportpublic	s.t.
7	Djamolidine Abdoujaparov (UZB)	Lampre–Polti	s.t.
8	Roberto Pelliconi (ITA)	Mercatone Uno–Zucchini–Medeghini	s.t.
9	Fabio Bordonali (ITA)	Mercatone Uno–Zucchini–Medeghini	s.t.
10	Tony Rominger (SUI)	CLAS–Cajastur	s.t.

General classification after Stage 15

Rank	Rider	Team	Time
1	Tony Rominger (SUI)	CLAS–Cajastur	68h 47' 31"
2	Alex Zülle (SUI)	ONCE	+ 33"
3	Laudelino Cubino (ESP)	Amaya Seguros	+ 3' 40"
4	Oliverio Rincón (COL)	Amaya Seguros	+ 6' 14"
5	Marino Alonso (ESP)	Banesto	+ 6' 24"
6	Jesús Montoya (ESP)	Amaya Seguros	+ 6' 43"
7	Pedro Delgado (ESP)	Banesto	+ 6' 49"
8	Melcior Mauri (ESP)	Amaya Seguros	+ 7' 09"
9	Johan Bruyneel (BEL)	ONCE	+ 10' 21"
10	Erik Breukink (NED)	ONCE	+ 12' 00"

== Stage 16 ==
11 May 1993 — Santander to Alto Campoo, 160 km (99 mi)

Stage 16 result

Rank	Rider	Team	Time
1	Jesús Montoya (ESP)	Amaya Seguros	5h 01' 22"
2	Tony Rominger (SUI)	CLAS–Cajastur	+ 1' 06"
3	Alex Zülle (SUI)	ONCE	s.t.
4	Laudelino Cubino (ESP)	Amaya Seguros	s.t.
5	Oliverio Rincón (COL)	Amaya Seguros	+ 1' 12"
6	Fernando Escartín (ESP)	CLAS–Cajastur	+ 1' 22"
7	Johan Bruyneel (BEL)	ONCE	+ 1' 30"
8	Pedro Delgado (ESP)	Banesto	s.t.
9	José Martín Farfán (COL)	Kelme–Xacobeo	+ 1' 34"
10	Melcior Mauri (ESP)	Amaya Seguros	+ 2' 18"

General classification after Stage 16

Rank	Rider	Team	Time
1	Tony Rominger (SUI)	CLAS–Cajastur	73h 49' 59"
2	Alex Zülle (SUI)	ONCE	+ 33"
3	Laudelino Cubino (ESP)	Amaya Seguros	+ 3' 40"
4	Jesús Montoya (ESP)	Amaya Seguros	+ 5' 37"
5	Oliverio Rincón (COL)	Amaya Seguros	+ 6' 20"
6	Pedro Delgado (ESP)	Banesto	+ 7' 13"
7	Melcior Mauri (ESP)	Amaya Seguros	+ 8' 21"
8	Johan Bruyneel (BEL)	ONCE	+ 10' 45"
9	Erik Breukink (NED)	ONCE	+ 13' 20"
10	Hernán Buenahora (COL)	Kelme–Xacobeo	+ 13' 55"

== Stage 17 ==
12 May 1993 — Santander to Lakes of Covadonga, 179.5 km (111.5 mi)

Stage 17 result

Rank	Rider	Team	Time
1	Oliverio Rincón (COL)	Amaya Seguros	5h 25' 19"
2	Tony Rominger (SUI)	CLAS–Cajastur	+ 1' 15"
3	Alex Zülle (SUI)	ONCE	s.t.
4	Laudelino Cubino (ESP)	Amaya Seguros	s.t.
5	Jesús Montoya (ESP)	Amaya Seguros	+ 1' 18"
6	Pedro Delgado (ESP)	Banesto	+ 1' 24"
7	Mikel Zarrabeitia (ESP)	Amaya Seguros	s.t.
8	Erik Breukink (NED)	ONCE	+ 1' 30"
9	Fernando Escartín (ESP)	CLAS–Cajastur	s.t.
10	Fabio Hernán Rodríguez (COL)	CLAS–Cajastur	+ 3' 18"

General classification after Stage 17

Rank	Rider	Team	Time
1	Tony Rominger (SUI)	CLAS–Cajastur	79h 16' 33"
2	Alex Zülle (SUI)	ONCE	+ 33"
3	Laudelino Cubino (ESP)	Amaya Seguros	+ 3' 40"
4	Oliverio Rincón (COL)	Amaya Seguros	+ 5' 05"
5	Jesús Montoya (ESP)	Amaya Seguros	+ 5' 40"
6	Pedro Delgado (ESP)	Banesto	+ 7' 22"
7	Melcior Mauri (ESP)	Amaya Seguros	+ 9' 58"
8	Johan Bruyneel (BEL)	ONCE	+ 12' 58"
9	Erik Breukink (NED)	ONCE	+ 13' 35"
10	Fernando Escartín (ESP)	CLAS–Cajastur	+ 14' 56"

== Stage 18 ==
13 May 1993 — Cangas de Onís to Gijón, 170 km (110 mi)

Stage 18 result

Rank	Rider	Team	Time
1	Serguei Outschakov (UKR)	Lampre–Polti	4h 21' 10"
2	Peter Meinert Nielsen (DEN)	TVM–Bison Kit	+ 2"
3	Adriano Baffi (ITA)	Mercatone Uno–Zucchini–Medeghini	+ 26"
4	Asiat Saitov (RUS)	Kelme–Xacobeo	+ 55"
5	Orlando Rodrigues (POR)	Artiach–Filipinos–Chiquilin	s.t.
6	Tom Cordes (NED)	Amaya Seguros	s.t.
7	Roberto Torres (ESP)	Festina–Lotus	s.t.
8	José Ramón Uriarte (ESP)	Banesto	+ 58"
9	Fabrizio Bontempi (ITA)	Eldor–Viner	+ 8' 55"
10	Marek Szerszyński (POL)	Lampre–Polti	s.t.

General classification after Stage 18

Rank	Rider	Team	Time
1	Tony Rominger (SUI)	CLAS–Cajastur	83h 46' 38"
2	Alex Zülle (SUI)	ONCE	+ 33"
3	Laudelino Cubino (ESP)	Amaya Seguros	+ 3' 40"
4	Oliverio Rincón (COL)	Amaya Seguros	+ 5' 05"
5	Jesús Montoya (ESP)	Amaya Seguros	+ 5' 40"
6	Pedro Delgado (ESP)	Banesto	+ 7' 22"
7	Melcior Mauri (ESP)	Amaya Seguros	+ 9' 58"
8	Johan Bruyneel (BEL)	ONCE	+ 12' 58"
9	Erik Breukink (NED)	ONCE	+ 13' 35"
10	Fernando Escartín (ESP)	CLAS–Cajastur	+ 15' 56"

== Stage 19 ==
14 May 1993 — Gijón to Alto del Naranco, 153 km (95 mi)

Stage 19 result

Rank	Rider	Team	Time
1	Tony Rominger (SUI)	CLAS–Cajastur	3h 59' 41"
2	Laudelino Cubino (ESP)	Amaya Seguros	+ 35"
3	Alex Zülle (SUI)	ONCE	+ 44"
4	Oliverio Rincón (COL)	Amaya Seguros	s.t.
5	Jesús Montoya (ESP)	Amaya Seguros	+ 54"
6	Pedro Delgado (ESP)	Banesto	+ 59"
7	Enrico Zaina (ITA)	Mercatone Uno–Zucchini–Medeghini	+ 2' 02"
8	Johan Bruyneel (BEL)	ONCE	s.t.
9	Erik Breukink (NED)	ONCE	s.t.
10	José Luis de Santos (ESP)	Banesto	+ 2' 11"

General classification after Stage 19

Rank	Rider	Team	Time
1	Tony Rominger (SUI)	CLAS–Cajastur	87h 46' 19"
2	Alex Zülle (SUI)	ONCE	+ 1' 17"
3	Laudelino Cubino (ESP)	Amaya Seguros	+ 4' 15"
4	Oliverio Rincón (COL)	Amaya Seguros	+ 5' 49"
5	Jesús Montoya (ESP)	Amaya Seguros	+ 6' 34"
6	Pedro Delgado (ESP)	Banesto	+ 8' 21"
7	Johan Bruyneel (BEL)	ONCE	+ 15' 00"
8	Erik Breukink (NED)	ONCE	+ 15' 37"
9	Melcior Mauri (ESP)	Amaya Seguros	+ 15' 44"
10	Fernando Escartín (ESP)	CLAS–Cajastur	+ 18' 07"

== Stage 20 ==
15 May 1993 — Salas to Ferrol, 247 km (153 mi)

Stage 20 result

Rank	Rider	Team	Time
1	Djamolidine Abdoujaparov (UZB)	Lampre–Polti	7h 18' 58"
2	Alfonso Gutiérrez (ESP)	Artiach–Filipinos–Chiquilin	s.t.
3	Asiat Saitov (RUS)	Kelme–Xacobeo	s.t.
4	Johnny Dauwe (BEL)	Collstrop–Assur Carpets	s.t.
5	Adriano Baffi (ITA)	Mercatone Uno–Zucchini–Medeghini	s.t.
6	Laurent Jalabert (FRA)	ONCE	s.t.
7	Thierry Marie (FRA)	Festina–Lotus	s.t.
8	Fabrizio Bontempi (ITA)	Eldor–Viner	s.t.
9	Ángel Edo (ESP)	Kelme–Xacobeo	s.t.
10	José Luis Santamaría (ESP)	Banesto	s.t.

General classification after Stage 20

Rank	Rider	Team	Time
1	Tony Rominger (SUI)	CLAS–Cajastur	95h 05' 16"
2	Alex Zülle (SUI)	ONCE	+ 1' 17"
3	Laudelino Cubino (ESP)	Amaya Seguros	+ 4' 15"
4	Oliverio Rincón (COL)	Amaya Seguros	+ 5' 49"
5	Jesús Montoya (ESP)	Amaya Seguros	+ 6' 34"
6	Pedro Delgado (ESP)	Banesto	+ 8' 21"
7	Johan Bruyneel (BEL)	ONCE	+ 15' 00"
8	Erik Breukink (NED)	ONCE	+ 15' 37"
9	Melcior Mauri (ESP)	Amaya Seguros	+ 15' 44"
10	Fernando Escartín (ESP)	CLAS–Cajastur	+ 18' 07"

== Stage 21 ==
16 May 1993 — Padrón to Santiago de Compostela, 44.6 km (27.7 mi) (ITT)

Stage 21 result

Rank	Rider	Team	Time
1	Alex Zülle (SUI)	ONCE	1h 00' 59"
2	Tony Rominger (SUI)	CLAS–Cajastur	+ 48"
3	Erik Breukink (NED)	ONCE	+ 2' 29"
4	Pedro Delgado (ESP)	Banesto	+ 3' 44"
5	Oliverio Rincón (COL)	Amaya Seguros	+ 4' 24"
6	Jesús Montoya (ESP)	Amaya Seguros	+ 4' 41"
7	Melcior Mauri (ESP)	Amaya Seguros	+ 4' 57"
8	Luca Gelfi (ITA)	Eldor–Viner	+ 5' 11"
9	Laudelino Cubino (ESP)	Amaya Seguros	+ 5' 27"
10	Mikel Zarrabeitia (ESP)	Amaya Seguros	+ 5' 28"

General classification after Stage 21

Rank	Rider	Team	Time
1	Tony Rominger (SUI)	CLAS–Cajastur	96h 07' 03"
2	Alex Zülle (SUI)	ONCE	+ 29"
3	Laudelino Cubino (ESP)	Amaya Seguros	+ 8' 54"
4	Oliverio Rincón (COL)	Amaya Seguros	+ 9' 25"
5	Jesús Montoya (ESP)	Amaya Seguros	+ 10' 27"
6	Pedro Delgado (ESP)	Banesto	+ 11' 17"
7	Erik Breukink (NED)	ONCE	+ 17' 18"
8	Melcior Mauri (ESP)	Amaya Seguros	+ 19' 53"
9	Johan Bruyneel (BEL)	ONCE	+ 20' 01"
10	Fernando Escartín (ESP)	CLAS–Cajastur	+ 23' 27"
