= 1993 Vuelta a España, Stage 1 to Stage 11 =

Cycling race stages

The 1993 Vuelta a España was the 48th edition of the Vuelta a España, one of cycling's Grand Tours. The Vuelta began in A Coruña, with an individual time trial on 26 April, and Stage 11 occurred on 6 May with a stage to Cerler. The race finished in Santiago de Compostela on 16 May.

== Stage 1 ==
26 April 1993 — A Coruña to A Coruña, 10 km (6.2 mi) (ITT)

Stage 1 result and general classification after Stage 1

Rank	Rider	Team	Time
1	Alex Zülle (SUI)	ONCE	11' 55"
2	Erik Breukink (NED)	ONCE	+ 30"
3	Tony Rominger (SUI)	CLAS–Cajastur	s.t.
4	Laurent Jalabert (FRA)	ONCE	+ 31"
5	Marino Alonso (ESP)	Banesto	+ 32"
6	Julián Gorospe (ESP)	Banesto	s.t.
7	Aitor Garmendia (ESP)	Banesto	+ 35"
8	Stephen Hodge (AUS)	ONCE	+ 36"
9	Melcior Mauri (ESP)	Amaya Seguros	s.t.
10	Thierry Marie (FRA)	Festina–Lotus	+ 38"

== Stage 2 ==
27 April 1993 — A Coruña to Vigo, 251.1 km (156.0 mi)

Stage 2 result

Rank	Rider	Team	Time
1	Alfonso Gutiérrez (ESP)	Artiach–Filipinos–Chiquilin	5h 20' 47"
2	Jean-Paul van Poppel (NED)	Festina–Lotus	s.t.
3	Djamolidine Abdoujaparov (UZB)	Lampre–Polti	s.t.
4	Luboš Lom (CZE)	Navigare–Blue Storm	s.t.
5	Scott Sunderland (AUS)	TVM–Bison Kit	s.t.
6	Tristan Hoffman (NED)	TVM–Bison Kit	s.t.
7	Roberto Pagnin (ITA)	Navigare–Blue Storm	s.t.
8	Fabiano Fontanelli (ITA)	Navigare–Blue Storm	s.t.
9	Hendrik Redant (BEL)	Collstrop–Assur Carpets	s.t.
10	Mathieu Hermans (NED)	TVM–Bison Kit	s.t.

General classification after Stage 2

Rank	Rider	Team	Time
1	Alex Zülle (SUI)	ONCE	5h 32' 42"
2	Erik Breukink (NED)	ONCE	+ 30"
3	Tony Rominger (SUI)	CLAS–Cajastur	s.t.
4	Laurent Jalabert (FRA)	ONCE	+ 31"
5	Marino Alonso (ESP)	Banesto	+ 32"
6	Julián Gorospe (ESP)	Banesto	s.t.
7	Aitor Garmendia (ESP)	Banesto	+ 35"
8	Stephen Hodge (AUS)	ONCE	+ 36"
9	Melcior Mauri (ESP)	Amaya Seguros	s.t.
10	Thierry Marie (FRA)	Festina–Lotus	+ 38"

== Stage 3 ==
28 April 1993 — Vigo to Ourense, 171.4 km (106.5 mi)

Stage 3 result

Rank	Rider	Team	Time
1	Laurent Jalabert (FRA)	ONCE	4h 19' 21"
2	Djamolidine Abdoujaparov (UZB)	Lampre–Polti	s.t.
3	Tony Rominger (SUI)	CLAS–Cajastur	+ 2"
4	Scott Sunderland (AUS)	TVM–Bison Kit	s.t.
5	Adriano Baffi (ITA)	Mercatone Uno–Zucchini–Medeghini	s.t.
6	Juan Carlos González Salvador (ESP)	Eldor–Viner	s.t.
7	Roberto Pagnin (ITA)	Navigare–Blue Storm	s.t.
8	Laudelino Cubino (ESP)	Amaya Seguros	s.t.
9	Fabrizio Bontempi (ITA)	Eldor–Viner	s.t.
10	Pedro Silva (POR)	Sicasal–Acral	s.t.

General classification after Stage 3

Rank	Rider	Team	Time
1	Alex Zülle (SUI)	ONCE	9h 52' 05"
2	Laurent Jalabert (FRA)	ONCE	+ 29"
3	Erik Breukink (NED)	ONCE	+ 30"
4	Tony Rominger (SUI)	CLAS–Cajastur	s.t.
5	Marino Alonso (ESP)	Banesto	+ 32"
6	Julián Gorospe (ESP)	Banesto	s.t.
7	Aitor Garmendia (ESP)	Banesto	+ 35"
8	Stephen Hodge (AUS)	ONCE	+ 36"
9	Melcior Mauri (ESP)	Amaya Seguros	s.t.
10	Thierry Marie (FRA)	Festina–Lotus	+ 38"

== Stage 4 ==
29 April 1993 — A Gudiña to Salamanca, 233.4 km (145.0 mi)

Stage 4 result

Rank	Rider	Team	Time
1	Jean-Paul van Poppel (NED)	Festina–Lotus	5h 45' 50"
2	Adriano Baffi (ITA)	Mercatone Uno–Zucchini–Medeghini	s.t.
3	Laurent Jalabert (FRA)	ONCE	s.t.
4	Roberto Pagnin (ITA)	Navigare–Blue Storm	s.t.
5	Asiat Saitov (RUS)	Kelme–Xacobeo	s.t.
6	José Rodríguez (ESP)	Deportpublic	s.t.
7	Scott Sunderland (AUS)	TVM–Bison Kit	s.t.
8	Alfonso Gutiérrez (ESP)	Artiach–Filipinos–Chiquilin	s.t.
9	Juan Carlos González Salvador (ESP)	Eldor–Viner	s.t.
10	José Luis Santamaría (ESP)	Banesto	s.t.

General classification after Stage 4

Rank	Rider	Team	Time
1	Alex Zülle (SUI)	ONCE	15h 37' 55"
2	Laurent Jalabert (FRA)	ONCE	+ 29"
3	Erik Breukink (NED)	ONCE	+ 30"
4	Tony Rominger (SUI)	CLAS–Cajastur	s.t.
5	Marino Alonso (ESP)	Banesto	+ 32"
6	Julián Gorospe (ESP)	Banesto	s.t.
7	Aitor Garmendia (ESP)	Banesto	+ 35"
8	Stephen Hodge (AUS)	ONCE	+ 36"
9	Melcior Mauri (ESP)	Amaya Seguros	s.t.
10	Thierry Marie (FRA)	Festina–Lotus	+ 38"

== Stage 5 ==
30 April 1993 — Salamanca to Ávila, 219.8 km (136.6 mi)

Stage 5 result

Rank	Rider	Team	Time
1	Marino Alonso (ESP)	Banesto	6h 08' 29"
2	Tony Rominger (SUI)	CLAS–Cajastur	+ 28"
3	Jesús Montoya (ESP)	Amaya Seguros	s.t.
4	Enrico Zaina (ITA)	Mercatone Uno–Zucchini–Medeghini	s.t.
5	Alex Zülle (SUI)	ONCE	s.t.
6	Laurent Jalabert (FRA)	ONCE	s.t.
7	Melcior Mauri (ESP)	Amaya Seguros	s.t.
8	Pedro Delgado (ESP)	Banesto	s.t.
9	Erik Breukink (NED)	ONCE	s.t.
10	Luca Gelfi (ITA)	Eldor–Viner	s.t.

General classification after Stage 5

Rank	Rider	Team	Time
1	Alex Zülle (SUI)	ONCE	21h 46' 52"
2	Marino Alonso (ESP)	Banesto	+ 4"
3	Laurent Jalabert (FRA)	ONCE	+ 29"
4	Erik Breukink (NED)	ONCE	+ 30"
5	Tony Rominger (SUI)	CLAS–Cajastur	s.t.
6	Julián Gorospe (ESP)	Banesto	+ 32"
7	Aitor Garmendia (ESP)	Banesto	+ 35"
8	Melcior Mauri (ESP)	Amaya Seguros	+ 36"
9	Luca Gelfi (ITA)	Eldor–Viner	+ 39"
10	Mikel Zarrabeitia (ESP)	Amaya Seguros	+ 44"

== Stage 6 ==
1 May 1993 — Palazuelos de Eresma (Destilerías DYC) to Navacerrada, 24.1 km (15.0 mi) (ITT)

Stage 6 result

Rank	Rider	Team	Time
1	Alex Zülle (SUI)	ONCE	41' 59"
2	Tony Rominger (SUI)	CLAS–Cajastur	+ 35"
3	Laudelino Cubino (ESP)	Amaya Seguros	+ 59"
4	Jesús Montoya (ESP)	Amaya Seguros	+ 1' 42"
5	Oliverio Rincón (COL)	Amaya Seguros	s.t.
6	Marino Alonso (ESP)	Banesto	+ 2' 31"
7	Pedro Delgado (ESP)	Banesto	+ 2' 36"
8	Melcior Mauri (ESP)	Amaya Seguros	+ 2' 48"
9	Luca Gelfi (ITA)	Eldor–Viner	+ 2' 57"
10	Julián Gorospe (ESP)	Banesto	+ 3' 14"

General classification after Stage 6

Rank	Rider	Team	Time
1	Alex Zülle (SUI)	ONCE	22h 28' 51"
2	Tony Rominger (SUI)	CLAS–Cajastur	+ 1' 05"
3	Laudelino Cubino (ESP)	Amaya Seguros	+ 2' 02"
4	Jesús Montoya (ESP)	Amaya Seguros	+ 2' 30"
5	Marino Alonso (ESP)	Banesto	+ 2' 35"
6	Oliverio Rincón (COL)	Amaya Seguros	+ 3' 11"
7	Pedro Delgado (ESP)	Banesto	+ 3' 21"
8	Melcior Mauri (ESP)	Amaya Seguros	+ 3' 24"
9	Luca Gelfi (ITA)	Eldor–Viner	+ 3' 36"
10	Julián Gorospe (ESP)	Banesto	+ 3' 46"

== Stage 7 ==
2 May 1993 — Palazuelos de Eresma (Destilerías DYC) to Madrid, 184 km (114 mi)

Stage 7 result

Rank	Rider	Team	Time
1	Laurent Jalabert (FRA)	ONCE	4h 07' 20"
2	Mathieu Hermans (NED)	TVM–Bison Kit	s.t.
3	Juan Carlos González Salvador (ESP)	Eldor–Viner	s.t.
4	Scott Sunderland (AUS)	TVM–Bison Kit	s.t.
5	Roberto Pagnin (ITA)	Navigare–Blue Storm	s.t.
6	Manuel Luis Abreu Campos (POR)	Sicasal–Acral	s.t.
7	Fabiano Fontanelli (ITA)	Navigare–Blue Storm	s.t.
8	Hendrik Redant (BEL)	Collstrop–Assur Carpets	s.t.
9	Roberto Pelliconi (ITA)	Mercatone Uno–Zucchini–Medeghini	s.t.
10	Johnny Dauwe (BEL)	Collstrop–Assur Carpets	s.t.

General classification after Stage 7

Rank	Rider	Team	Time
1	Alex Zülle (SUI)	ONCE	26h 36' 11"
2	Tony Rominger (SUI)	CLAS–Cajastur	+ 1' 05"
3	Laudelino Cubino (ESP)	Amaya Seguros	+ 2' 02"
4	Marino Alonso (ESP)	Banesto	+ 2' 35"
5	Pedro Delgado (ESP)	Banesto	+ 3' 21"
6	Melcior Mauri (ESP)	Amaya Seguros	+ 3' 24"
7	Jesús Montoya (ESP)	Amaya Seguros	+ 3' 42"
8	Julián Gorospe (ESP)	Banesto	+ 3' 46"
9	Erik Breukink (NED)	ONCE	+ 3' 56"
10	Aitor Garmendia (ESP)	Banesto	+ 3' 59"

== Stage 8 ==
3 May 1993 — Aranjuez to Albacete, 225.1 km (139.9 mi)

Stage 8 result

Rank	Rider	Team	Time
1	Jean-Paul van Poppel (NED)	Festina–Lotus	6h 29' 28"
2	Roberto Pagnin (ITA)	Navigare–Blue Storm	s.t.
3	Adriano Baffi (ITA)	Mercatone Uno–Zucchini–Medeghini	s.t.
4	Laurent Jalabert (FRA)	ONCE	s.t.
5	José Ramón Uriarte (ESP)	Banesto	s.t.
6	Fabiano Fontanelli (ITA)	Navigare–Blue Storm	s.t.
7	Fabrizio Bontempi (ITA)	Eldor–Viner	s.t.
8	Roberto Pelliconi (ITA)	Mercatone Uno–Zucchini–Medeghini	s.t.
9	Paulo Ferreira (POR)	Sicasal–Acral	s.t.
10	Djamolidine Abdoujaparov (UZB)	Lampre–Polti	s.t.

General classification after Stage 8

Rank	Rider	Team	Time
1	Alex Zülle (SUI)	ONCE	33h 05' 39"
2	Tony Rominger (SUI)	CLAS–Cajastur	+ 1' 05"
3	Laudelino Cubino (ESP)	Amaya Seguros	+ 2' 02"
4	Marino Alonso (ESP)	Banesto	+ 2' 35"
5	Pedro Delgado (ESP)	Banesto	+ 3' 21"
6	Melcior Mauri (ESP)	Amaya Seguros	+ 3' 24"
7	Jesús Montoya (ESP)	Amaya Seguros	+ 3' 42"
8	Julián Gorospe (ESP)	Banesto	+ 3' 46"
9	Erik Breukink (NED)	ONCE	+ 3' 56"
10	Aitor Garmendia (ESP)	Banesto	+ 3' 59"

== Stage 9 ==
4 May 1993 — Albacete to Valencia, 224 km (139 mi)

Stage 9 result

Rank	Rider	Team	Time
1	Djamolidine Abdoujaparov (UZB)	Lampre–Polti	6h 12' 20"
2	Giovanni Lombardi (ITA)	Lampre–Polti	s.t.
3	Jean-Paul van Poppel (NED)	Festina–Lotus	s.t.
4	Juan Carlos González Salvador (ESP)	Eldor–Viner	s.t.
5	Laurent Jalabert (FRA)	ONCE	s.t.
6	Ángel Edo (ESP)	Kelme–Xacobeo	s.t.
7	Adriano Baffi (ITA)	Mercatone Uno–Zucchini–Medeghini	s.t.
8	Alfonso Gutiérrez (ESP)	Artiach–Filipinos–Chiquilin	s.t.
9	Zbigniew Spruch (POL)	Lampre–Polti	s.t.
10	Johnny Dauwe (BEL)	Collstrop–Assur Carpets	s.t.

General classification after Stage 9

Rank	Rider	Team	Time
1	Alex Zülle (SUI)	ONCE	39h 17' 59"
2	Tony Rominger (SUI)	CLAS–Cajastur	+ 1' 05"
3	Laudelino Cubino (ESP)	Amaya Seguros	+ 2' 02"
4	Marino Alonso (ESP)	Banesto	+ 2' 35"
5	Pedro Delgado (ESP)	Banesto	+ 3' 21"
6	Melcior Mauri (ESP)	Amaya Seguros	+ 3' 24"
7	Jesús Montoya (ESP)	Amaya Seguros	+ 3' 42"
8	Julián Gorospe (ESP)	Banesto	+ 3' 46"
9	Erik Breukink (NED)	ONCE	+ 3' 56"
10	Aitor Garmendia (ESP)	Banesto	+ 3' 59"

== Stage 10 ==
5 May 1993 — Valencia to La Sénia, 206 km (128 mi)

Stage 10 result

Rank	Rider	Team	Time
1	Juan Carlos González Salvador (ESP)	Eldor–Viner	5h 59' 08"
2	Zbigniew Spruch (POL)	Lampre–Polti	s.t.
3	Alfonso Gutiérrez (ESP)	Artiach–Filipinos–Chiquilin	s.t.
4	Djamolidine Abdoujaparov (UZB)	Lampre–Polti	s.t.
5	Roberto Pagnin (ITA)	Navigare–Blue Storm	s.t.
6	Laurent Jalabert (FRA)	ONCE	s.t.
7	Johnny Dauwe (BEL)	Collstrop–Assur Carpets	s.t.
8	Fabrizio Bontempi (ITA)	Eldor–Viner	s.t.
9	Manuel Luis Abreu Campos (POR)	Sicasal–Acral	s.t.
10	Asiat Saitov (RUS)	Kelme–Xacobeo	s.t.

General classification after Stage 10

Rank	Rider	Team	Time
1	Alex Zülle (SUI)	ONCE	45h 17' 07"
2	Tony Rominger (SUI)	CLAS–Cajastur	+ 1' 05"
3	Laudelino Cubino (ESP)	Amaya Seguros	+ 2' 02"
4	Marino Alonso (ESP)	Banesto	+ 2' 35"
5	Pedro Delgado (ESP)	Banesto	+ 3' 21"
6	Melcior Mauri (ESP)	Amaya Seguros	+ 3' 24"
7	Jesús Montoya (ESP)	Amaya Seguros	+ 3' 42"
8	Julián Gorospe (ESP)	Banesto	+ 3' 46"
9	Erik Breukink (NED)	ONCE	+ 3' 56"
10	Aitor Garmendia (ESP)	Banesto	+ 3' 59"

== Stage 11 ==
6 May 1993 — Lleida to Cerler, 221 km (137 mi)

Stage 11 result

Rank	Rider	Team	Time
1	Tony Rominger (SUI)	CLAS–Cajastur	6h 09' 28"
2	Oliverio Rincón (COL)	Amaya Seguros	s.t.
3	Alex Zülle (SUI)	ONCE	+ 47"
4	Laudelino Cubino (ESP)	Amaya Seguros	s.t.
5	Pedro Delgado (ESP)	Banesto	+ 2' 11"
6	Melcior Mauri (ESP)	Amaya Seguros	s.t.
7	Hernán Buenahora (COL)	Kelme–Xacobeo	s.t.
8	Jesús Montoya (ESP)	Amaya Seguros	s.t.
9	Marino Alonso (ESP)	Banesto	s.t.
10	José Martín Farfán (COL)	Kelme–Xacobeo	s.t.

General classification after Stage 11

Rank	Rider	Team	Time
1	Alex Zülle (SUI)	ONCE	51h 27' 22"
2	Tony Rominger (SUI)	CLAS–Cajastur	+ 18"
3	Laudelino Cubino (ESP)	Amaya Seguros	+ 2' 02"
4	Oliverio Rincón (COL)	Amaya Seguros	+ 3' 36"
5	Marino Alonso (ESP)	Banesto	+ 3' 59"
6	Pedro Delgado (ESP)	Banesto	+ 4' 45"
7	Melcior Mauri (ESP)	Amaya Seguros	+ 4' 48"
8	Jesús Montoya (ESP)	Amaya Seguros	+ 5' 06"
9	Johan Bruyneel (BEL)	ONCE	+ 6' 39"
10	Hernán Buenahora (COL)	Kelme–Xacobeo	+ 7' 33"
