= List of teams and cyclists in the 1995 Giro d'Italia =

The 1995 Giro d'Italia was the 78th edition of the Giro d'Italia, one of cycling's Grand Tours. The field consisted of 198 riders, and 122 riders finished the race.

== By rider ==
Legend
No.	Starting number worn by the rider during the Giro
Pos.	Position in the general classification
DNF	Denotes a rider who did not finish

No.	Name	Nationality	Team	Ref
1	Evgeni Berzin	Russia	Gewiss–Ballan	
2	Vladislav Bobrik	Russia	Gewiss–Ballan	
3	Giorgio Furlan	Italy	Gewiss–Ballan	
4	Piotr Ugrumov	Russia	Gewiss–Ballan	
5	Bruno Cenghialta	Italy	Gewiss–Ballan	
6	Mauro-Antonio Santaromita	Italy	Gewiss–Ballan	
7	Alberto Volpi	Italy	Gewiss–Ballan	
8	Nicola Minali	Italy	Gewiss–Ballan	
9	Francesco Frattini	Italy	Gewiss–Ballan	
11	Dimitri Konyshev	Russia	Aki–Gipiemme	
12	Zenon Jaskuła	Poland	Aki–Gipiemme	
13	Gilberto Simoni	Italy	Aki–Gipiemme	
14	Andrey Teteryuk	Kazakhstan	Aki–Gipiemme	
15	Mauro Bettin	Italy	Aki–Gipiemme	
16	Giuseppe Citterio	Italy	Aki–Gipiemme	
17	Roberto Dal Sie	Italy	Aki–Gipiemme	
18	Stefano Zanatta	Italy	Aki–Gipiemme	
19	Denis Zanette	Italy	Aki–Gipiemme	
21	Simone Borgheresi	Italy	Amore & Vita–Galatron	
22	Davide Dall'ollio	Italy	Amore & Vita–Galatron	
23	Alessio Di Basco	Italy	Amore & Vita–Galatron	
24	Antonio Fanelli	Italy	Amore & Vita–Galatron	
25	Riccardo Forconi	Italy	Amore & Vita–Galatron	
26	Michel Lafis	Sweden	Amore & Vita–Galatron	
27	Maurizio Molinari	Italy	Amore & Vita–Galatron	
28	Sandro Giacomelli	Italy	Amore & Vita–Galatron	
29	Marco Villa	Italy	Amore & Vita–Galatron	
31	José Luis Arrieta	Spain	Banesto	
32	Thomas Davy	France	Banesto	
33	Andrew Hampsten	United States	Banesto	
34	Stéphane Heulot	France	Banesto	
35	Prudencio Induráin	Spain	Banesto	
36	José María Jiménez	Spain	Banesto	
37	Óscar López Uriarte	Spain	Banesto	
38	Jesús Montoya	Spain	Banesto	
39	Erwin Nijboer	Netherlands	Banesto	
41	Massimo Podenzana	Italy	Brescialat–Fago	
42	Paolo Lanfranchi	Italy	Brescialat–Fago	
43	Mario Manzoni	Italy	Brescialat–Fago	
44	Fabrizio Bontempi	Italy	Brescialat–Fago	
45	Filippo Casagrande	Italy	Brescialat–Fago	
46	Luca Gelfi	Italy	Brescialat–Fago	
47	Giancarlo Perini	Italy	Brescialat–Fago	
48	Mariano Piccoli	Italy	Brescialat–Fago	
49	Omar Pumar	Venezuela	Brescialat–Fago	
51	Claudio Chiappucci	Italy	Carrera Jeans–Tassoni	
52	Nicola Miceli	Italy	Carrera Jeans–Tassoni	
53	Enrico Zaina	Italy	Carrera Jeans–Tassoni	
54	Marcello Siboni	Italy	Carrera Jeans–Tassoni	
55	Stefano Checchin	Italy	Carrera Jeans–Tassoni	
56	Mario Chiesa	Italy	Carrera Jeans–Tassoni	
57	Mario Mantovan	Italy	Carrera Jeans–Tassoni	
58	Alessandro Bertolini	Italy	Carrera Jeans–Tassoni	
59	Sergio Barbero	Italy	Carrera Jeans–Tassoni	
61	Eleuterio Anguita	Spain	Castellblanch	
62	Francisco Cerezo	Spain	Castellblanch	
63	Antonio Miguel Díaz	Spain	Castellblanch	
64	Carlos Galarreta	Spain	Castellblanch	
65	Alfredo Irusta Sampedro	Spain	Castellblanch	
66	Carlos Maya	Venezuela	Castellblanch	
67	Germán Nieto	Spain	Castellblanch	
68	José Manuel Uría	Spain	Castellblanch	
69	Juan Carlos Vicario	Spain	Castellblanch	
71	Armand de Las Cuevas	France	Castorama	
72	Laurent Desbiens	France	Castorama	
73	Philippe Gaumont	France	Castorama	
74	Laurent Madouas	France	Castorama	
75	Emmanuel Magnien	France	Castorama	
76	Stéphane Pétilleau	France	Castorama	
77	François Simon	France	Castorama	
78	Gilles Talmant	France	Castorama	
79	Bruno Thibout	France	Castorama	
81	Heinz Imboden	Switzerland	Refin	
82	Felice Puttini	Italy	Refin	
83	Frank Van Den Abbeele	Belgium	Refin	
84	Rodolfo Massi	Italy	Refin	
85	Stefano Giraldi	Italy	Refin	
86	Leonardo Piepoli	Italy	Refin	
87	Roberto Pelliconi	Italy	Refin	
88	Andreas Kappes	Germany	Refin	
89	Johan Capiot	Belgium	Refin	
91	Laurent Dufaux	Switzerland	Festina–Lotus	
92	Pascal Hervé	France	Festina–Lotus	
93	Stephen Hodge	Australia	Festina–Lotus	
94	Roberto Torres	Spain	Festina–Lotus	
95	Francisque Teyssier	France	Festina–Lotus	
96	Jean-Jacques Henry	France	Festina–Lotus	
97	Fabian Jeker	Switzerland	Festina–Lotus	
98	Juan-Rodrigo Arenas	Spain	Festina–Lotus	
99	Bruno Boscardin	Italy	Festina–Lotus	
101	Laudelino Cubino	Spain	Kelme–Sureña	
102	Ignacio García Camacho	Spain	Kelme–Sureña	
103	José Rodriguez Garcia	Spain	Kelme–Sureña	
104	Hernán Buenahora	Colombia	Kelme–Sureña	
105	Ángel Camargo	Colombia	Kelme–Sureña	
106	Federico Muñoz	Colombia	Kelme–Sureña	
107	Chepe González	Colombia	Kelme–Sureña	
108	Julio César Aguirre	Colombia	Kelme–Sureña	
109	José Martín Farfán	Colombia	Kelme–Sureña	
111	Maurizio Fondriest	Italy	Lampre–Panaria	
112	Wladimir Belli	Italy	Lampre–Panaria	
113	Davide Bramati	Italy	Lampre–Panaria	
114	Roberto Conti	Italy	Lampre–Panaria	
115	Gianni Faresin	Italy	Lampre–Panaria	
116	Ján Svorada	Slovakia	Lampre–Panaria	
117	Zbigniew Spruch	Poland	Lampre–Panaria	
118	Pavel Tonkov	Russia	Lampre–Panaria	
119	Marco Zen	Italy	Lampre–Panaria	
121	Fabio Baldato	Italy	MG Maglificio–Technogym	
122	Alberto Elli	Italy	MG Maglificio–Technogym	
123	Nicola Loda	Italy	MG Maglificio–Technogym	
124	Davide Rebellin	Italy	MG Maglificio–Technogym	
125	Pascal Richard	Switzerland	MG Maglificio–Technogym	
126	Marco Saligari	Italy	MG Maglificio–Technogym	
127	Luca Scinto	Italy	MG Maglificio–Technogym	
128	Rolf Sørensen	Denmark	MG Maglificio–Technogym	
129	Franco Vona	Italy	MG Maglificio–Technogym	
131	Andrea Chiurato	Italy	Mapei–GB–Latexco	
132	Miguel Ángel Peña	Spain	Mapei–GB–Latexco	
133	Arsenio González	Spain	Mapei–GB–Latexco	
134	Francisco Javier Mauleón	Spain	Mapei–GB–Latexco	
135	Daniele Nardello	Italy	Mapei–GB–Latexco	
136	Andrea Noè	Italy	Mapei–GB–Latexco	
137	Tony Rominger	Switzerland	Mapei–GB–Latexco	
138	Andrea Tafi	Italy	Mapei–GB–Latexco	
139	Jon Unzaga	Spain	Mapei–GB–Latexco	
141	Mario Cipollini	Italy	Mercatone Uno–Saeco	
142	Francesco Casagrande	Italy	Mercatone Uno–Saeco	
143	Massimiliano Lelli	Italy	Mercatone Uno–Saeco	
144	Massimo Donati	Italy	Mercatone Uno–Saeco	
145	Silvio Martinello	Italy	Mercatone Uno–Saeco	
146	Roberto Petito	Italy	Mercatone Uno–Saeco	
147	Paolo Fornaciari	Italy	Mercatone Uno–Saeco	
148	Angelo Canzonieri	Italy	Mercatone Uno–Saeco	
149	Giuseppe Calcaterra	Italy	Mercatone Uno–Saeco	
151	Michele Coppolillo	Italy	Navigare–Blue Storm	
152	Massimo Strazzer	Italy	Navigare–Blue Storm	
153	Giuseppe Guerini	Italy	Navigare–Blue Storm	
154	Alexandr Shefer	Kazakhstan	Navigare–Blue Storm	
155	Sauro Gallorini	Italy	Navigare–Blue Storm	
156	Angelo Citracca	Italy	Navigare–Blue Storm	
157	Andrea Vatteroni	Italy	Navigare–Blue Storm	
158	Vassili Davidenko	Russia	Navigare–Blue Storm	
159	Francesco Secchiari	Italy	Navigare–Blue Storm	
161	Erik Breukink	Netherlands	ONCE	
162	Luis María Díaz De Otazu	Spain	ONCE	
163	Marcelino García Alonso	Spain	ONCE	
164	Santos Hernández	Spain	ONCE	
165	Patrick Jonker	Australia	ONCE	
166	Alberto Leanizbarrutia	Spain	ONCE	
167	Juan Llaneras	Spain	ONCE	
168	Oliverio Rincón	Colombia	ONCE	
169	José Roberto Sierra	Spain	ONCE	
171	Marcel Abreu	Portugal	Sicasal–Acral	
172	Michael Andersson	Sweden	Sicasal–Acral	
173	Dariusz Bigos	Poland	Sicasal–Acral	
174	Joaquin Gomes	Portugal	Sicasal–Acral	
175	Carlos Pinho	Portugal	Sicasal–Acral	
176	Karol Rychlik	Poland	Sicasal–Acral	
177	Quintino Rodrigues	Portugal	Sicasal–Acral	
178	Pedro Silva	Portugal	Sicasal–Acral	
179	Serafin Vieira	Portugal	Sicasal–Acral	
181	Dirk Baldinger	Germany	Polti–Granarolo–Santini	
182	Éric Boyer	France	Polti–Granarolo–Santini	
183	Giovanni Fidanza	Italy	Polti–Granarolo–Santini	
184	Daisuke Imanaka	Japan	Polti–Granarolo–Santini	
185	Giovanni Lombardi	Italy	Polti–Granarolo–Santini	
186	Serguei Outschakov	Ukraine	Polti–Granarolo–Santini	
187	Oscar Pelliccioli	Italy	Polti–Granarolo–Santini	
188	Mario Scirea	Italy	Polti–Granarolo–Santini	
189	Georg Totschnig	Austria	Polti–Granarolo–Santini	
191	Udo Bölts	Germany	Team Telekom	
192	Christian Henn	Germany	Team Telekom	
193	Jens Heppner	Germany	Team Telekom	
194	Kai Hundertmarck	Germany	Team Telekom	
195	Mario Kummer	Germany	Team Telekom	
196	Vladimir Poulnikov	Russia	Team Telekom	
197	Heinrich Trumheller	Germany	Team Telekom	
198	Jürgen Werner	Germany	Team Telekom	
199	Steffen Wesemann	Germany	Team Telekom	
201	Lars Kristian Johnsen	Norway	TVM–Polis Direct	
202	Jim Van De Laer	Belgium	TVM–Polis Direct	
203	Roland Meier	Switzerland	TVM–Polis Direct	
204	Peter Meinert Nielsen	Denmark	TVM–Polis Direct	
205	Peter Van Petegem	Belgium	TVM–Polis Direct	
206	Steven Rooks	Netherlands	TVM–Polis Direct	
207	Jesper Skibby	Denmark	TVM–Polis Direct	
208	Bart Voskamp	Netherlands	TVM–Polis Direct	
209	Bo Hamburger	Denmark	TVM–Polis Direct	
211	Stefano Cattai	Italy	ZG Mobili–Selle Italia	
212	Andrea Ferrigato	Italy	ZG Mobili–Selle Italia	
213	Fabiano Fontanelli	Italy	ZG Mobili–Selle Italia	
214	Carlo Finco	Italy	ZG Mobili–Selle Italia	
215	Massimo Ghirotto	Italy	ZG Mobili–Selle Italia	
216	Roberto Menegotto	Italy	ZG Mobili–Selle Italia	
217	Raúl Montaña	Colombia	ZG Mobili–Selle Italia	
218	Roberto Pagnin	Italy	ZG Mobili–Selle Italia	
219	Nelson Rodríguez Serna	Colombia	ZG Mobili–Selle Italia	
