= 1995 Giro d'Italia, Stage 12 to Stage 22 =

Cycling race stages

The 1995 Giro d'Italia was the 78th edition of the Giro d'Italia, one of cycling's Grand Tours. The Giro began in Perugia on 13 May, and Stage 12 occurred on 25 May with a stage from Borgo a Mozzano. The race finished in Milan on 4 June.

== Stage 12 ==
25 May 1995 — Borgo a Mozzano to Cento, 201 km (125 mi)

Stage 12 result

Rank	Rider	Team	Time
1	Ján Svorada (SVK)	Lampre–Panaria	5h 04' 50"
2	Giovanni Lombardi (ITA)	Polti–Granarolo–Santini	s.t.
3	Giuseppe Citterio (ITA)	Aki–Gipiemme	s.t.
4	Mario Manzoni (ITA)	Brescialat–Fago	s.t.
5	Jean-Jacques Henry (FRA)	Festina–Lotus	s.t.
6	Johan Capiot (BEL)	Refin	s.t.
7	Michel Lafis (SWE)	Amore & Vita–Galatron	s.t.
8	Nicola Minali (ITA)	Gewiss–Ballan	s.t.
9	Rolf Sørensen (DEN)	MG Maglificio–Technogym	s.t.
10	Roberto Pelliconi (ITA)	Refin	s.t.

General classification after Stage 12

Rank	Rider	Team	Time
1	Tony Rominger (SUI)	Mapei–GB–Latexco	49h 14' 49"
2	Piotr Ugrumov (RUS)	Gewiss–Ballan	+ 3' 08"
3	Evgeni Berzin (RUS)	Gewiss–Ballan	+ 3' 16"
4	Francesco Casagrande (ITA)	Mercatone Uno–Saeco	+ 3' 20"
5	Claudio Chiappucci (ITA)	Carrera Jeans–Tassoni	+ 5' 12"
6	Enrico Zaina (ITA)	Carrera Jeans–Tassoni	+ 6' 24"
7	Bruno Cenghialta (ITA)	Gewiss–Ballan	+ 6' 48"
8	Pavel Tonkov (RUS)	Lampre–Panaria	+ 6' 52"
9	Alberto Elli (ITA)	MG Maglificio–Technogym	+ 7' 02"
10	Davide Rebellin (ITA)	MG Maglificio–Technogym	+ 7' 12"

== Stage 13 ==
26 May 1995 — Pieve di Cento to Rovereto, 218 km (135 mi)

Stage 13 result

Rank	Rider	Team	Time
1	Pascal Richard (SUI)	MG Maglificio–Technogym	5h 44' 07"
2	Oliverio Rincón (COL)	ONCE	s.t.
3	Vladislav Bobrik (RUS)	Gewiss–Ballan	+ 3"
4	Giuseppe Guerini (ITA)	Navigare–Blue Storm	+ 26"
5	Mariano Piccoli (ITA)	Brescialat–Fago	+ 46"
6	Davide Rebellin (ITA)	MG Maglificio–Technogym	+ 1' 22"
7	Claudio Chiappucci (ITA)	Carrera Jeans–Tassoni	s.t.
8	Francesco Casagrande (ITA)	Mercatone Uno–Saeco	s.t.
9	Jens Heppner (GER)	Team Telekom	s.t.
10	Enrico Zaina (ITA)	Carrera Jeans–Tassoni	s.t.

General classification after Stage 13

Rank	Rider	Team	Time
1	Tony Rominger (SUI)	Mapei–GB–Latexco	55h 00' 18"
2	Piotr Ugrumov (RUS)	Gewiss–Ballan	+ 3' 08"
3	Evgeni Berzin (RUS)	Gewiss–Ballan	+ 3' 16"
4	Francesco Casagrande (ITA)	Mercatone Uno–Saeco	+ 3' 20"
5	Claudio Chiappucci (ITA)	Carrera Jeans–Tassoni	+ 5' 12"
6	Enrico Zaina (ITA)	Carrera Jeans–Tassoni	+ 6' 24"
7	Bruno Cenghialta (ITA)	Gewiss–Ballan	+ 6' 48"
8	Pavel Tonkov (RUS)	Lampre–Panaria	+ 6' 52"
9	Davide Rebellin (ITA)	MG Maglificio–Technogym	+ 7' 12"
10	Heinz Imboden (SUI)	Refin	+ 7' 14"

== Stage 14 ==
27 May 1995 — Trento to Schnals, 240 km (150 mi)

Stage 14 result

Rank	Rider	Team	Time
1	Oliverio Rincón (COL)	ONCE	7h 32' 07"
2	Georg Totschnig (AUT)	Polti–Granarolo–Santini	+ 1' 18"
3	Tony Rominger (SUI)	Mapei–GB–Latexco	+ 1' 20"
4	Piotr Ugrumov (RUS)	Gewiss–Ballan	+ 1' 22"
5	Claudio Chiappucci (ITA)	Carrera Jeans–Tassoni	+ 1' 29"
6	Evgeni Berzin (RUS)	Gewiss–Ballan	s.t.
7	Heinz Imboden (SUI)	Refin	s.t.
8	Pavel Tonkov (RUS)	Lampre–Panaria	+ 1' 26"
9	Hernán Buenahora (COL)	Kelme–Sureña	+ 2' 28"
10	Arsenio González (ESP)	Mapei–GB–Latexco	s.t.

General classification after Stage 14

Rank	Rider	Team	Time
1	Tony Rominger (SUI)	Mapei–GB–Latexco	62h 33' 41"
2	Piotr Ugrumov (RUS)	Gewiss–Ballan	+ 3' 14"
3	Evgeni Berzin (RUS)	Gewiss–Ballan	+ 3' 29"
4	Francesco Casagrande (ITA)	Mercatone Uno–Saeco	+ 4' 43"
5	Claudio Chiappucci (ITA)	Carrera Jeans–Tassoni	+ 5' 25"
6	Oliverio Rincón (COL)	ONCE	+ 6' 13"
7	Heinz Imboden (SUI)	Refin	+ 7' 27"
8	Georg Totschnig (AUT)	Polti–Granarolo–Santini	+ 7' 50"
9	Pavel Tonkov (RUS)	Lampre–Panaria	+ 8' 04"
10	Enrico Zaina (ITA)	Carrera Jeans–Tassoni	+ 9' 11"

== Stage 15 ==
28 May 1995 — Schnals to Lenzerheide, 185 km (115 mi)

Stage 15 result

Rank	Rider	Team	Time
1	Mariano Piccoli (ITA)	Brescialat–Fago	4h 42' 09"
2	Giuseppe Guerini (ITA)	Navigare–Blue Storm	s.t.
3	Francesco Frattini (ITA)	Gewiss–Ballan	+ 1' 23"
4	François Simon (FRA)	Castorama	+ 2' 06"
5	Enrico Zaina (ITA)	Carrera Jeans–Tassoni	s.t.
6	Georg Totschnig (AUT)	Polti–Granarolo–Santini	s.t.
7	Heinz Imboden (SUI)	Refin	s.t.
8	Claudio Chiappucci (ITA)	Carrera Jeans–Tassoni	+ 2' 18"
9	Oliverio Rincón (COL)	ONCE	s.t.
10	Piotr Ugrumov (RUS)	Gewiss–Ballan	s.t.

General classification after Stage 15

Rank	Rider	Team	Time
1	Tony Rominger (SUI)	Mapei–GB–Latexco	67h 18' 06"
2	Piotr Ugrumov (RUS)	Gewiss–Ballan	+ 3' 14"
3	Evgeni Berzin (RUS)	Gewiss–Ballan	+ 3' 29"
4	Claudio Chiappucci (ITA)	Carrera Jeans–Tassoni	+ 5' 25"
5	Oliverio Rincón (COL)	ONCE	+ 6' 13"
6	Heinz Imboden (SUI)	Refin	+ 7' 25"
7	Georg Totschnig (AUT)	Polti–Granarolo–Santini	+ 7' 38"
8	Pavel Tonkov (RUS)	Lampre–Panaria	+ 8' 04"
9	Enrico Zaina (ITA)	Carrera Jeans–Tassoni	+ 8' 59"
10	Francesco Casagrande (ITA)	Mercatone Uno–Saeco	+ 9' 34"

== Stage 16 ==
29 May 1995 — Lenzerheide to Treviglio, 224 km (139 mi)

Stage 16 result

Rank	Rider	Team	Time
1	Giuseppe Citterio (ITA)	Aki–Gipiemme	5h 44' 44"
2	Roberto Pagnin (ITA)	ZG Mobili–Selle Italia	s.t.
3	Davide Bramati (ITA)	Lampre–Panaria	s.t.
4	Silvio Martinello (ITA)	Mercatone Uno–Saeco	s.t.
5	François Simon (FRA)	Castorama	s.t.
6	Rolf Sørensen (DEN)	MG Maglificio–Technogym	s.t.
7	Giovanni Fidanza (ITA)	Polti–Granarolo–Santini	s.t.
8	Michel Lafis (SWE)	Amore & Vita–Galatron	s.t.
9	Marco Villa (ITA)	Amore & Vita–Galatron	s.t.
10	Andreas Kappes (GER)	Refin	s.t.

General classification after Stage 16

Rank	Rider	Team	Time
1	Tony Rominger (SUI)	Mapei–GB–Latexco	73h 02' 52"
2	Piotr Ugrumov (RUS)	Gewiss–Ballan	+ 3' 14"
3	Evgeni Berzin (RUS)	Gewiss–Ballan	+ 3' 29"
4	Claudio Chiappucci (ITA)	Carrera Jeans–Tassoni	+ 5' 25"
5	Oliverio Rincón (COL)	ONCE	+ 6' 13"
6	Heinz Imboden (SUI)	Refin	+ 7' 15"
7	Georg Totschnig (AUT)	Polti–Granarolo–Santini	+ 7' 38"
8	Pavel Tonkov (RUS)	Lampre–Panaria	+ 8' 04"
9	Enrico Zaina (ITA)	Carrera Jeans–Tassoni	+ 8' 59"
10	Francesco Casagrande (ITA)	Mercatone Uno–Saeco	+ 9' 34"

== Stage 17 ==
30 May 1995 — Cenate Sotto to Selvino, 43 km (27 mi) (ITT)

Stage 17 result

Rank	Rider	Team	Time
1	Tony Rominger (SUI)	Mapei–GB–Latexco	1h 05' 39"
2	Evgeni Berzin (RUS)	Gewiss–Ballan	+ 1' 39"
3	Piotr Ugrumov (RUS)	Gewiss–Ballan	+ 2' 03"
4	Francesco Casagrande (ITA)	Mercatone Uno–Saeco	+ 3' 11"
5	Pavel Tonkov (RUS)	Lampre–Panaria	+ 3' 27"
6	Zenon Jaskuła (POL)	Aki–Gipiemme	+ 3' 44"
7	Oliverio Rincón (COL)	ONCE	+ 4' 08"
8	Claudio Chiappucci (ITA)	Carrera Jeans–Tassoni	+ 4' 10"
9	Heinz Imboden (SUI)	Refin	+ 4' 37"
10	Georg Totschnig (AUT)	Polti–Granarolo–Santini	+ 4' 44"

General classification after Stage 17

Rank	Rider	Team	Time
1	Tony Rominger (SUI)	Mapei–GB–Latexco	74h 08' 51"
2	Evgeni Berzin (RUS)	Gewiss–Ballan	+ 5' 08"
3	Piotr Ugrumov (RUS)	Gewiss–Ballan	+ 5' 17"
4	Claudio Chiappucci (ITA)	Carrera Jeans–Tassoni	+ 9' 35"
5	Oliverio Rincón (COL)	ONCE	+ 10' 21"
6	Pavel Tonkov (RUS)	Lampre–Panaria	+ 11' 31"
7	Heinz Imboden (SUI)	Refin	+ 11' 52"
8	Georg Totschnig (AUT)	Polti–Granarolo–Santini	+ 12' 22"
9	Francesco Casagrande (ITA)	Mercatone Uno–Saeco	+ 12' 45"
10	Enrico Zaina (ITA)	Carrera Jeans–Tassoni	+ 13' 44"

== Stage 18 ==
31 May 1995 — Stradella to Sanctuary of Vicoforte, 221 km (137 mi)

Stage 18 result

Rank	Rider	Team	Time
1	Denis Zanette (ITA)	Aki–Gipiemme	5h 30' 44"
2	Giuseppe Guerini (ITA)	Navigare–Blue Storm	s.t.
3	Serguei Outschakov (UKR)	Polti–Granarolo–Santini	+ 1' 11"
4	Vladimir Poulnikov (RUS)	Team Telekom	s.t.
5	Roberto Pelliconi (ITA)	Refin	s.t.
6	Lars Kristian Johnsen (NOR)	TVM–Polis Direct	s.t.
7	Roberto Pagnin (ITA)	ZG Mobili–Selle Italia	s.t.
8	Andrey Teteryuk (KAZ)	Aki–Gipiemme	s.t.
9	Davide Rebellin (ITA)	MG Maglificio–Technogym	s.t.
10	Mario Chiesa (ITA)	Carrera Jeans–Tassoni	s.t.

General classification after Stage 18

Rank	Rider	Team	Time
1	Tony Rominger (SUI)	Mapei–GB–Latexco	79h 55' 00"
2	Evgeni Berzin (RUS)	Gewiss–Ballan	+ 5' 08"
3	Piotr Ugrumov (RUS)	Gewiss–Ballan	+ 5' 17"
4	Claudio Chiappucci (ITA)	Carrera Jeans–Tassoni	+ 9' 35"
5	Oliverio Rincón (COL)	ONCE	+ 10' 21"
6	Pavel Tonkov (RUS)	Lampre–Panaria	+ 11' 31"
7	Heinz Imboden (SUI)	Refin	+ 11' 52"
8	Georg Totschnig (AUT)	Polti–Granarolo–Santini	+ 12' 22"
9	Francesco Casagrande (ITA)	Mercatone Uno–Saeco	+ 12' 45"
10	Enrico Zaina (ITA)	Carrera Jeans–Tassoni	+ 13' 44"

== Stage 19 ==
1 June 1995 — Mondovì to Pontechianale, 129 km (80 mi)

Stage 19 result

Rank	Rider	Team	Time
1	Pascal Richard (SUI)	MG Maglificio–Technogym	4h 01' 11"
2	Rodolfo Massi (ITA)	Refin	s.t.
3	Nelson Rodríguez Serna (COL)	ZG Mobili–Selle Italia	s.t.
4	Hernán Buenahora (COL)	Kelme–Sureña	+ 10"
5	Massimo Ghirotto (ITA)	ZG Mobili–Selle Italia	+ 1' 06"
6	Marcello Siboni (ITA)	Carrera Jeans–Tassoni	+ 1' 08"
7	Thomas Davy (FRA)	Banesto	s.t.
8	Giancarlo Perini (ITA)	Brescialat–Fago	s.t.
9	Patrick Jonker (AUS)	ONCE	s.t.
10	Francesco Frattini (ITA)	Gewiss–Ballan	+ 4' 58"

General classification after Stage 19

Rank	Rider	Team	Time
1	Tony Rominger (SUI)	Mapei–GB–Latexco	84h 01' 09"
2	Evgeni Berzin (RUS)	Gewiss–Ballan	+ 5' 08"
3	Piotr Ugrumov (RUS)	Gewiss–Ballan	+ 5' 17"
4	Claudio Chiappucci (ITA)	Carrera Jeans–Tassoni	+ 9' 35"
5	Oliverio Rincón (COL)	ONCE	+ 10' 21"
6	Pavel Tonkov (RUS)	Lampre–Panaria	+ 11' 31"
7	Heinz Imboden (SUI)	Refin	+ 11' 52"
8	Georg Totschnig (AUT)	Polti–Granarolo–Santini	+ 12' 22"
9	Francesco Casagrande (ITA)	Mercatone Uno–Saeco	+ 12' 45"
10	Enrico Zaina (ITA)	Carrera Jeans–Tassoni	+ 13' 44"

== Stage 20 ==
2 June 1995 — Briançon to Gressoney-Saint-Jean, 203 km (126 mi)

Stage 20 result

Rank	Rider	Team	Time
1	Serguei Outschakov (UKR)	Polti–Granarolo–Santini	4h 59' 58"
2	Pascal Richard (SUI)	MG Maglificio–Technogym	+ 5"
3	Piotr Ugrumov (RUS)	Gewiss–Ballan	+ 8"
4	Evgeni Berzin (RUS)	Gewiss–Ballan	s.t.
5	Oliverio Rincón (COL)	ONCE	s.t.
6	Claudio Chiappucci (ITA)	Carrera Jeans–Tassoni	+ 26"
7	Pavel Tonkov (RUS)	Lampre–Panaria	s.t.
8	Tony Rominger (SUI)	Mapei–GB–Latexco	s.t.
9	Paolo Lanfranchi (ITA)	Brescialat–Fago	s.t.
10	Georg Totschnig (AUT)	Polti–Granarolo–Santini	s.t.

General classification after Stage 20

Rank	Rider	Team	Time
1	Tony Rominger (SUI)	Mapei–GB–Latexco	89h 01' 33"
2	Evgeni Berzin (RUS)	Gewiss–Ballan	+ 4' 50"
3	Piotr Ugrumov (RUS)	Gewiss–Ballan	+ 4' 55"
4	Claudio Chiappucci (ITA)	Carrera Jeans–Tassoni	+ 9' 35"
5	Oliverio Rincón (COL)	ONCE	+ 10' 03"
6	Pavel Tonkov (RUS)	Lampre–Panaria	+ 11' 31"
7	Heinz Imboden (SUI)	Refin	+ 11' 52"
8	Georg Totschnig (AUT)	Polti–Granarolo–Santini	+ 12' 22"
9	Francesco Casagrande (ITA)	Mercatone Uno–Saeco	+ 13' 07"
10	Enrico Zaina (ITA)	Carrera Jeans–Tassoni	+ 13' 44"

== Stage 21 ==
3 June 1995 — Pont-Saint-Martin to Luino, 190 km (120 mi)

Stage 21 result

Rank	Rider	Team	Time
1	Evgeni Berzin (RUS)	Gewiss–Ballan	5h 04' 59"
2	Claudio Chiappucci (ITA)	Carrera Jeans–Tassoni	+ 21"
3	Enrico Zaina (ITA)	Carrera Jeans–Tassoni	+ 25"
4	Pavel Tonkov (RUS)	Lampre–Panaria	s.t.
5	Piotr Ugrumov (RUS)	Gewiss–Ballan	s.t.
6	Tony Rominger (SUI)	Mapei–GB–Latexco	s.t.
7	Nelson Rodríguez Serna (COL)	ZG Mobili–Selle Italia	s.t.
8	Oliverio Rincón (COL)	ONCE	s.t.
9	Bruno Cenghialta (ITA)	Gewiss–Ballan	+ 4' 56"
10	Heinz Imboden (SUI)	Refin	s.t.

General classification after Stage 21

Rank	Rider	Team	Time
1	Tony Rominger (SUI)	Mapei–GB–Latexco	94h 06' 57"
2	Evgeni Berzin (RUS)	Gewiss–Ballan	+ 4' 13"
3	Piotr Ugrumov (RUS)	Gewiss–Ballan	+ 4' 55"
4	Claudio Chiappucci (ITA)	Carrera Jeans–Tassoni	+ 9' 23"
5	Oliverio Rincón (COL)	ONCE	+ 10' 03"
6	Pavel Tonkov (RUS)	Lampre–Panaria	+ 11' 31"
7	Enrico Zaina (ITA)	Carrera Jeans–Tassoni	+ 13' 40"
8	Heinz Imboden (SUI)	Refin	+ 16' 23"
9	Georg Totschnig (AUT)	Polti–Granarolo–Santini	+ 18' 05"
10	Francesco Casagrande (ITA)	Mercatone Uno–Saeco	+ 18' 50"

== Stage 22 ==
4 June 1995 — Luino to Milan, 148 km (92 mi)

Stage 22 result

Rank	Rider	Team	Time
1	Giovanni Lombardi (ITA)	Polti–Granarolo–Santini	3h 02' 53"
2	Mario Manzoni (ITA)	Brescialat–Fago	s.t.
3	Silvio Martinello (ITA)	Mercatone Uno–Saeco	s.t.
4	Roberto Pelliconi (ITA)	Refin	s.t.
5	Giuseppe Citterio (ITA)	Aki–Gipiemme	s.t.
6	Giovanni Fidanza (ITA)	Polti–Granarolo–Santini	s.t.
7	Andreas Kappes (GER)	Refin	s.t.
8	Roberto Pagnin (ITA)	ZG Mobili–Selle Italia	s.t.
9	Bo Hamburger (DEN)	TVM–Polis Direct	s.t.
10	Bruno Thibout (FRA)	Castorama	s.t.

General classification after Stage 22

Rank	Rider	Team	Time
1	Tony Rominger (SUI)	Mapei–GB–Latexco	97h 39' 50"
2	Evgeni Berzin (RUS)	Gewiss–Ballan	+ 4' 13"
3	Piotr Ugrumov (RUS)	Gewiss–Ballan	+ 4' 55"
4	Claudio Chiappucci (ITA)	Carrera Jeans–Tassoni	+ 9' 23"
5	Oliverio Rincón (COL)	ONCE	+ 10' 03"
6	Pavel Tonkov (RUS)	Lampre–Panaria	+ 11' 31"
7	Enrico Zaina (ITA)	Carrera Jeans–Tassoni	+ 13' 40"
8	Heinz Imboden (SUI)	Refin	+ 16' 23"
9	Georg Totschnig (AUT)	Polti–Granarolo–Santini	+ 18' 05"
10	Francesco Casagrande (ITA)	Mercatone Uno–Saeco	+ 18' 50"
