= 1991 Vuelta a Murcia =

Race details
- Dates: 12–17 March 1991
- Stages: 6
- Distance: 878 km (545.6 mi)
- Winning time: 22h 27' 59"

Results
	Winner	José Luis Villanueva (ESP)
	Second	Claudio Chiappucci (ITA)
	Third	Julián Gorospe (ESP)

The 1991 Vuelta a Murcia was the seventh edition of the Vuelta a Murcia cycle race and was held on 12 March to 17 March 1991. The race started and finished in Murcia. The race was won by José Luis Villanueva.

== General classification ==
Final general classification

Rank	Rider	Time
1	José Luis Villanueva (ESP)	22h 27' 59"
2	Claudio Chiappucci (ITA)	+ 3"
3	Julián Gorospe (ESP)	+ 4"
4	Viatcheslav Ekimov (RUS)	+ 5"
5	Eduardo Chozas (ESP)	+ 10"
6	Jesús Montoya (ESP)	+ 17"
7	Iñaki Gastón (ESP)	+ 24"
8	Hernán Buenahora (COL)	+ 29"
9	Luis Herrera (COL)	+ 32"
10	Oliverio Rincón (COL)	+ 32"
