= 1995 Tour de Romandie =

Race details
- Dates: 2–7 May 1995
- Stages: 5 + Prologue
- Distance: 888.8 km (552.3 mi)
- Winning time: 22h 42' 25"

Results
	Winner	Tony Rominger (SUI)	(Mapei–GB–Latexco)
	Second	Francesco Casagrande (ITA)	(Mercatone Uno–Saeco)
	Third	Piotr Ugrumov (LAT)	(Gewiss–Ballan)

The 1995 Tour de Romandie was the 49th edition of the Tour de Romandie cycle race and was held from 2 May to 7 May 1995. The race started in Bernex and finished in Geneva. The race was won by Tony Rominger of the Mapei team.

== General classification ==
Final general classification
Rank	Rider	Team	Time
1	Tony Rominger (SUI)	Mapei–GB–Latexco	22h 42' 25"
2	Francesco Casagrande (ITA)	Mercatone Uno–Saeco	+ 2' 33"
3	Piotr Ugrumov (LAT)	Gewiss–Ballan	+ 2' 33"
4	Davide Rebellin (ITA)	MG Maglificio–Technogym	+ 4' 03"
5	Beat Zberg (SUI)	Carrera Jeans–Tassoni	+ 4' 12"
6	Oliverio Rincón (COL)	ONCE	+ 4' 35"
7	Claudio Chiappucci (ITA)	Carrera Jeans–Tassoni	+ 6' 02"
8	Oscar Pelliccioli (ITA)	Polti–Granarolo–Santini	+ 6' 21"
9	Pavel Tonkov (RUS)	Lampre–Panaria	+ 6' 22"
10	Jesús Montoya (ESP)	Banesto	+ 6' 30"
