= 1995 Vuelta a Murcia =

Race details
- Dates: 1–5 March 1995
- Stages: 5
- Distance: 735.4 km (457.0 mi)
- Winning time: 20h 18' 46"

Results
	Winner	Adriano Baffi (ITA)
	Second	Erik Breukink (NED)
	Third	Maurizio Fondriest (ITA)

The 1995 Vuelta a Murcia was the 11th edition of the Vuelta a Murcia cycle race and was held on 1 March to 5 March 1995. The race started and finished in Murcia. The race was won by Adriano Baffi.

== General classification ==
Final general classification

Rank	Rider	Time
1	Adriano Baffi (ITA)	20h 18' 46"
2	Erik Breukink (NED)	+ 39"
3	Maurizio Fondriest (ITA)	+ 43"
4	Aitor Garmendia (ESP)	+ 56"
5	Edwig Van Hooydonck (BEL)	+ 58"
6	Andrea Peron (ITA)	+ 1' 04"
7	Asiat Saitov (RUS)	+ 1' 04"
8	Claudio Chiappucci (ITA)	+ 1' 08"
9	Francisco Cabello (ESP)	+ 1' 16"
10	Frans Maassen (NED)	+ 1' 17"
