= 1989 Vuelta a Murcia =

Race details
- Dates: 7–12 March 1989
- Stages: 6
- Distance: 846 km (525.7 mi)
- Winning time: 19h 06' 00"

Results
	Winner	Marino Alonso (ESP)
	Second	Silvano Contini (ITA)
	Third	Víctor Gonzalo (ESP)

The 1989 Vuelta a Murcia was the fifth edition of the Vuelta a Murcia cycle race and was held on 7 March to 12 March 1989. The race started in Mazarrón and finished in Murcia. The race was won by Marino Alonso.

== General classification ==
Final general classification

Rank	Rider	Time
1	Marino Alonso (ESP)	19h 06' 00"
2	Silvano Contini (ITA)	+ 59"
3	Víctor Gonzalo (ESP)	+ 1' 23"
4	Miguel-Angel Martinez Perez (ESP)	+ 1' 29"
5	Carlos Hernández Bailo (ESP)	+ 1' 37"
6	Marco Giovannetti (ITA)	+ 2' 02"
7	Mariano Sánchez Martinez (ESP)	+ 2' 09"
8	Francisco Javier Mauleón (ESP)	+ 2' 22"
9	Jon Unzaga (ESP)	+ 2' 29"
10	Abelardo Rondón (COL)	+ 2' 31"
