= 1995 Ronde van Nederland =

Dutch cycling race

These are the results for the 35th edition of the Ronde van Nederland cycling race, which was held from August 22 to August 26, 1995. The race started in Haarlem (North Holland) and finished in Valkenburg (Limburg).

== Final classification ==
RANK	NAME CYCLIST	TEAM	TIME
1.	Jelle Nijdam (NED)	TVM–Polis Direct	21:02:24
2.	Viatcheslav Ekimov (RUS)	Novell–Decca–Colnago	+ 0.14
3.	Flavio Vanzella (ITA)	MG Maglificio–Technogym	+ 0.18
4.	Zenon Jaskula (POL)	Aki–Gipiemme	+ 0.18
5.	Erik Breukink (NED)	ONCE	+ 0.45
6.	Frans Maassen (NED)	Novell–Decca–Colnago	+ 0.48
7.	Rolf Järmann (SUI)	MG Maglificio–Technogym	+ 0.49
8.	Maarten den Bakker (NED)	TVM–Polis Direct	+ 0.57
9.	Fabio Roscioli (ITA)	Refin	+ 1.11
10.	Aitor Garmendia (ESP)	Banesto	+ 1.25
