= 1994 Volta a Catalunya =

Race details
- Dates: 8–14 September 1994
- Stages: 7
- Distance: 978.4 km (607.9 mi)
- Winning time: 25h 22' 31"

Results
	Winner	Claudio Chiappucci (ITA)	(Carrera Jeans–Tassoni)
	Second	Fernando Escartín (ESP)	(Mapei–CLAS)
	Third	Pedro Delgado (ESP)	(Banesto)
	Mountains	José Manuel Uría (ESP)	(Deportpublic)
	Sprints	Stefano Cembali (ITA)	(Carrera Jeans–Tassoni)
	Team	Artiach–Nabisco	

The 1994 Volta a Catalunya was the 74th edition of the Volta a Catalunya cycle race and was held from 8 September to 14 September 1994. The race started in L'Hospitalet and finished in Sant Feliu de Guíxols. The race was won by Claudio Chiappucci of the Carrera team.

== General classification ==
Final general classification

Rank	Rider	Team	Time
1	Claudio Chiappucci (ITA)	Carrera Jeans–Tassoni	25h 22' 31"
2	Fernando Escartín (ESP)	Mapei–CLAS	+ 21"
3	Pedro Delgado (ESP)	Banesto	+ 30"
4	Wladimir Belli (ITA)	Lampre–Panaria	+ 1' 04"
5	Antonio Sánchez García (ESP)	Artiach–Nabisco	+ 1' 10"
–	~~Abraham Olano (ESP)~~	~~Mapei–CLAS~~	~~+ 1' 29"~~ (Note: Olano was penalised ten minutes in the general classification, and was disqualified from winning the first time trial. This was due to a positive drug test for caffeine, above the permitted limit.)
6	Johan Bruyneel (BEL)	ONCE	+ 1' 37"
7	Erik Breukink (NED)	ONCE	+ 1' 37"
8	Massimo Donati (ITA)	Mercatone Uno–Medeghini	+ 2' 22"
9	Daniel Clavero (ESP)	Artiach–Nabisco	+ 2' 25"
