= 1990 Volta a Catalunya =

Race details
- Dates: 7–13 September 1990
- Stages: 7
- Distance: 1,059.3 km (658.2 mi)
- Winning time: 26h 08' 31"

Results
	Winner	Laudelino Cubino (ESP)	(BH–Amaya Seguros)
	Second	Marino Lejarreta (ESP)	(ONCE)
	Third	Pedro Delgado (ESP)	(Banesto)
	Points	Marino Lejarreta (ESP)	(ONCE)
	Mountains	Thierry Claveyrolat (FRA)	(RMO)
	Sprints	Miguel Ángel Iglesias (ESP)	(Puertas Mavisa)
	Team	BH–Amaya Seguros	

The 1990 Volta a Catalunya was the 70th edition of the Volta a Catalunya cycle race and was held from 7 September to 13 September 1990. The race started in Barcelona and finished in Girona. The race was won by Laudelino Cubino of the BH team.

== General classification ==
Final general classification

Rank	Rider	Team	Time
1	Laudelino Cubino (ESP)	BH–Amaya Seguros	26h 08' 31"
2	Marino Lejarreta (ESP)	ONCE	+ 4"
3	Pedro Delgado (ESP)	Banesto	+ 26"
4	Iñaki Gastón (ESP)	CLAS–Cajastur	+ 37"
5	Federico Echave (ESP)	CLAS–Cajastur	+ 1' 36"
6	Enrique Aja (ESP)	Teka	+ 2' 16"
7	Óscar de Jesús Vargas (COL)	Postobón–Manzana–Ryalcao	+ 2' 30"
8	Jesús Montoya (ESP)	BH–Amaya Seguros	+ 3' 07"
9	Sean Kelly (IRL)	PDM–Concorde–Ultima	+ 3' 32"
10	Edgar Corredor (COL)	Café de Colombia	+ 5' 00"
