= Aitor Garmendia =

Spanish cyclist (born 1968)

Personal information
- Full name: Aitor Garmendia Arbilla
- Born: 3 March 1968 (age 58) Itsasondo, Spain
- Height: 1.75 m (5 ft 9 in)
- Weight: 68 kg (150 lb; 10 st 10 lb)

Cycling career
- Sport: Cycling
- Current team: Retired
- Discipline: Road
- Role: Rider
- Rider type: Time-trialist

Professional teams
- 1990–1995: Banesto
- 1996–1997: ONCE
- 1998–2000: Banesto
- 2001–2003: Team Coast

Aitor Garmendia (born 3 March 1968, in Itsasondo) is a former Spanish racing cyclist. He rode in 6 editions of the Tour de France, 8 editions of the Vuelta a España, and 1 edition of the Giro d'Italia.

== Major results ==
1990
1st GP Llodio
5th Overall Vuelta a Aragón
8th Overall Tour de la Communauté Européenne
1991
8th Subida a Urkiola
1992
9th Subida a Urkiola
1993
4th Overall Vuelta a Andalucía
1994
1st Stage 7 (ITT) Volta a Catalunya
2nd Overall Vuelta a Murcia
3rd Time trial, National Road Championships
5th GP Villafranca de Ordizia
6th Overall Tour de Luxembourg
1995
1st Subida a Txitxarro
2nd Overall Vuelta a Castilla y León

1st Stage 1

2nd Overall Vuelta a Aragón
3rd Time trial, National Road Championships
3rd Overall Setmana Catalana de Ciclisme
4th Overall Vuelta a Murcia
10th Overall Ronde van Nederland
1996
1st Prueba Villafranca de Ordizia
2nd Overall Vuelta a Aragón

1st Stage 2

6th Overall Critérium International
9th Trofeo Luis Puig
1997
1st Overall Volta ao Alentejo

1st Stage 5 (ITT)

1st Overall Vuelta a Aragón

1st Stage 4b (ITT)

1st Overall Tour of Galicia

1st Stage 3b (ITT)

4th GP Llodio
7th Trofeo Comunidad Foral de Navarra
9th Chrono des Herbiers
10th Overall Critérium International

1st Stage 3 (ITT)

1998
1st Overall Vuelta a Aragón

1st Stage 2

1st Overall Vuelta a Castilla y León

1st Stage 2

2nd Overall Euskal Bizikleta
5th Overall Tour of the Basque Country
7th Overall Vuelta a La Rioja
1999
3rd Trofeo Luis Ocana
2000
1st Stage 4 Euskal Bizikleta
2nd Overall Vuelta a Aragón
3rd Overall Vuelta a Andalucía
7th Overall Vuelta a Asturias
7th Overall Vuelta a La Rioja
8th Overall Tour of the Basque Country
8th Overall Setmana Catalana de Ciclisme
2001
2nd Overall Deutschland Tour
2nd Overall Peace Race
3rd Road race, National Road Championships
2002
2nd Overall Deutschland Tour

1st Stage 3

2nd Overall Volta a Catalunya

1st Stage 3 (ITT)

3rd Overall Peace Race
5th Overall Paris–Nice
2003
7th Luk-Cup Bühl

=== Grand Tour general classification results timeline ===
Grand Tour	1991	1992	1993	1994	1995	1996	1997	1998	1999	2000	2001	2002	2003
Giro d'Italia	89	—	—	—	—	—	—	—	—	—	—	—	—
Tour de France	—	108	DNF	—	95	35	63	—	—	—	—	—	70
Vuelta a España	—	46	DNF	72	—	—	121	DNF	—	—	DNF	85	122
