= 1993 Vuelta a España =

Race details
- Dates: 26 April – 15 May
- Stages: 21
- Distance: 3,605 km (2,240 mi)
- Winning time: 96h 07' 03"

Results
Jersey awarded to the overall winner	Winner	Tony Rominger (SUI)	(CLAS–Cajastur)
	Second	Alex Zülle (SUI)	(ONCE)
	Third	Laudelino Cubino (ESP)	(Amaya Seguros)
Jersey awarded to the points classification winner	Points	Tony Rominger (SUI)	(CLAS–Cajastur)
Jersey awarded to the mountains classification winner	Mountains	Tony Rominger (SUI)	(CLAS–Cajastur)
Jersey awarded to the combination classification winner	Combination	Jesús Montoya (ESP)	(Amaya Seguros)
Jersey awarded to the sprints classification winner	Sprints	Hendrik Redant (BEL)	(Collstrop)
	Team	Amaya Seguros	

The 48th Edition Vuelta a España (Tour of Spain), a long-distance bicycle stage race and one of the three grand tours, was held from 26 April to 15 May 1993. It consisted of 21 stages covering a total of 3,605 km (2,240 mi), and was won by Tony Rominger of the CLAS–Cajastur cycling team.

== Race preview and favorites ==
Tony Rominger, winner of the previous edition, started the race as the big favourite for the overall win. Among the other contenders were his rivals of the previous year, Jesús Montoya (supported by his Amaya Seguros team that included such names as Melcior Mauri, Laudelino Cubino and Oliverio Rincón), and Pedro Delgado. The ONCE team with Erik Breukink as team leader and riders of the calibre of Laurent Jalabert and Johan Bruyneel were also a strong candidates. Other candidates included Italian Marco Giovannetti and Scotsman Robert Millar, although they weren't supported by strong teams.

== Route ==
List of stages
Stage	Date	Course	Distance	Type	Winner
1	26 April	A Coruña to A Coruña	10 km (6 mi)	Individual time trial	Alex Zülle (SUI)
2	27 April	A Coruña to Vigo	251.1 km (156 mi)		Alfonso Gutiérrez (ESP)
3	28 April	Vigo to Ourense	171.4 km (107 mi)		Laurent Jalabert (FRA)
4	29 April	A Gudiña to Salamanca	233.4 km (145 mi)		Jean-Paul van Poppel (NED)
5	30 April	Salamanca to Ávila	219.8 km (137 mi)		Marino Alonso (ESP)
6	1 May	Palazuelos de Eresma (Destilerías DYC) to Navacerrada	24.1 km (15 mi)	Individual time trial	Alex Zülle (SUI)
7	2 May	Palazuelos de Eresma (Destilerías DYC) to Madrid	184 km (114 mi)		Laurent Jalabert (FRA)
8	3 May	Aranjuez to Albacete	225.1 km (140 mi)		Jean-Paul van Poppel (NED)
9	4 May	Albacete to Valencia	224 km (139 mi)		Djamolidine Abdoujaparov (UZB)
10	5 May	Valencia to La Sénia	206 km (128 mi)		Juan Carlos González Salvador (ESP)
11	6 May	Lleida to Cerler	221 km (137 mi)		Tony Rominger (SUI)
12	7 May	Benasque to Zaragoza	220.7 km (137 mi)		Djamolidine Abdoujaparov (UZB)
13	8 May	Zaragoza to Zaragoza	37.1 km (23 mi)	Individual time trial	Melcior Mauri (ESP)
14	9 May	Tudela to Alto de la Cruz de la Demanda (Ezcaray)	197.2 km (123 mi)		Tony Rominger (SUI)
15	10 May	Santo Domingo de la Calzada to Santander	226.2 km (141 mi)		Dag Otto Lauritzen (NOR)
16	11 May	Santander to Alto Campoo	160 km (99 mi)		Jesús Montoya (ESP)
17	12 May	Santander to Lakes of Covadonga	179.5 km (112 mi)		Oliverio Rincón (COL)
18	13 May	Cangas de Onís to Gijón	170 km (106 mi)		Serhiy Ushakov (UKR)
19	14 May	Gijón to Alto del Naranco	153 km (95 mi)		Tony Rominger (SUI)
20	15 May	Salas to Ferrol	247 km (153 mi)		Djamolidine Abdoujaparov (UZB)
21	16 May	Padrón to Santiago de Compostela	44.6 km (28 mi)	Individual time trial	Alex Zülle (SUI)
	Total		3,605 km (2,240 mi)		

== Race overview ==
A Swiss youngster, Alex Zülle, Breukink's ONCE teammate, who had been the revelation of the previous year's Tour de France, surprised by winning the prologue with a commanding lead of over half a minute over the rest of the contenders. He would keep the leader's jersey for the first week.

It was expected that the Swiss youngster, who had so far not shown climbing abilities, would lose the lead on the stage 5 mountain time trial to the Puerto de Navacerrada. Zülle not only kept his lead, he won the stage. Only Rominger seemed to be close to the rhythm of his young compatriot, as most of the favorites including Pedro Delgado lost over two minutes that day.

The high mountain stages started with the 11th, ending at Cerler. Rominger launched his first attack on the yellow jersey, winning the stage and taking almost a minute out of Zülle. He was now only 18 seconds down on the general classification. The rest of the favorites saw their chances slip away as they were now many minutes down. Only Cubino kept in touch, albeit at a deficit of two minutes.

After a close fought time trial in Zaragoza won by Mauri, the general classification was now solely a two-man fight. Two days later Rominger managed to distance Zülle on the climb to Valdezcaray and took the lead. Throughout most of the mountain stages on the Cordillera Cantabrica mountain range Rominger and Zülle closely marked each other, finishing together; However, on the final of those stages, Rominger hatched a plan to attack on a wet descent, taking advantage of Zülle's weak descending skills. Rominger managed to distance Zülle, which led to the inexperienced Zülle panicking, running wide at a corner and crashing, losing further time. By the end of the stage, Rominger had taken a famous solo win atop the Alto del Naranco and had taken another minute out of Zülle and his chasing ONCE team. This time gain would loom large by the end of the Vuelta.

The Vuelta's final stage was a 44 km individual time trial where Zülle was determined to take back Rominger's general classification lead of little over a minute. Rominger voiced his concern that a stomach illness he had contracted the day after the Naranco stage may cost him the overall win. In the end, Zülle took a dominant stage win but was unable to take back all the time he needed. Rominger thus took his second Vuelta with Zülle second and Cubino third.

Rominger dominated all three classifications and became only the second rider after Eddy Merckx in the 1968 Giro d'Italia and the 1969 Tour de France to achieve this in a Grand Tour.

== Results ==
=== Final General Classification ===
Rank	Rider	Team	Time
1	(Switzerland) Tony Rominger	CLAS–Cajastur	96h07'03''
2	(Switzerland) Alex Zülle	ONCE	29''
3	(Spain) Laudelino Cubino	Amaya Seguros	8'54''
4	(Colombia) Oliverio Rincón	Amaya Seguros	9'25''
5	(Spain) Jesús Montoya	Amaya Seguros	10'27''
6	(Spain) Pedro Delgado	Banesto	11'17''
7	(Netherlands) Erik Breukink	ONCE	17'58''
8	(Spain) Melcior Mauri	Amaya Seguros	19'53''
9	(Belgium) Johan Bruyneel	ONCE	20'01''
10	(Spain) Fernando Escartín	CLAS–Cajastur	23'27''
11	(Spain) Ignacio Gaston	CLAS–Cajastur	
12	(Spain) Mikel Zarrabeitia	Amaya Seguros	
13	(Colombia) Hernán Buenahora	Kelme–Xacobeo	
14	(Italy) Luca Gelfi	Banesto	
15	(United Kingdom) Robert Millar	TVM–Bison	
16	(Spain) Javier Murguialday	Amaya Seguros	
17	(Spain) José Ramon Uriarte Zubero	Banesto–Pinarello	
18	(Spain) Jon Unzaga Bombín	CLAS–Cajastur	
19	(Denmark) Peter Meinert Nielsen	TVM–Bison	
20	(Spain) Francisco Javier Mauleón	CLAS–Cajastur	
21	(Spain) Marino Alonso Monje	Banesto	
22	(Spain) Eduardo Chozas Olmo	Artiach–Filipinos	
23	(Spain) Arsenio González Gutiérrez	CLAS–Cajastur	
24	(Spain) Federico Echave Musatadi	CLAS–Cajastur	
25	(Spain) Jesús Blanco	Deportpublic–Otero	
