= José Roberto Sierra =

Spanish cyclist (born 1967)

Personal information
- Born: 21 March 1967 (age 59) Camargo, Spain
- Height: 1.80 m (5 ft 11 in)
- Weight: 66 kg (146 lb; 10 st 6 lb)

Cycling career
- Sport: Cycling
- Current team: Retired
- Discipline: Road
- Role: Rider

Professional teams
- 1989-1990: Teka
- 1991-1993: CLAS-Cajastur
- 1994-1999: ONCE

José Roberto Sierra Aguerro (born 21 March 1967 in Camargo) is a former Spanish cyclist. He participated in 5 Tours de France, 1 Giro d'Italia, and 4 Vuelta a España.

== Major results ==
1996
1st Vuelta a La Rioja
