= Marek Szerszyński =

Polish cyclist

Personal information
- Born: 8 October 1960 (age 66)

Cycling career
- Sport: Cycling
- Role: Rider

Marek Szerszyński (born 8 October 1960) is a Polish racing cyclist. He rode in the 1993 Tour de France.
