= Johnny Dauwe =

Belgian cyclist

Personal information
- Born: 31 May 1966 Antwerp, Belgium
- Died: 25 June 2003 (aged 37) Antwerp, Belgium

Cycling career
- Sport: Cycling

Johnny Dauwe (31 May 1966 – 25 June 2003) was a Belgian cyclist. He competed in the road race at the 1988 Summer Olympics.
