= Jon Unzaga =

Spanish cyclist

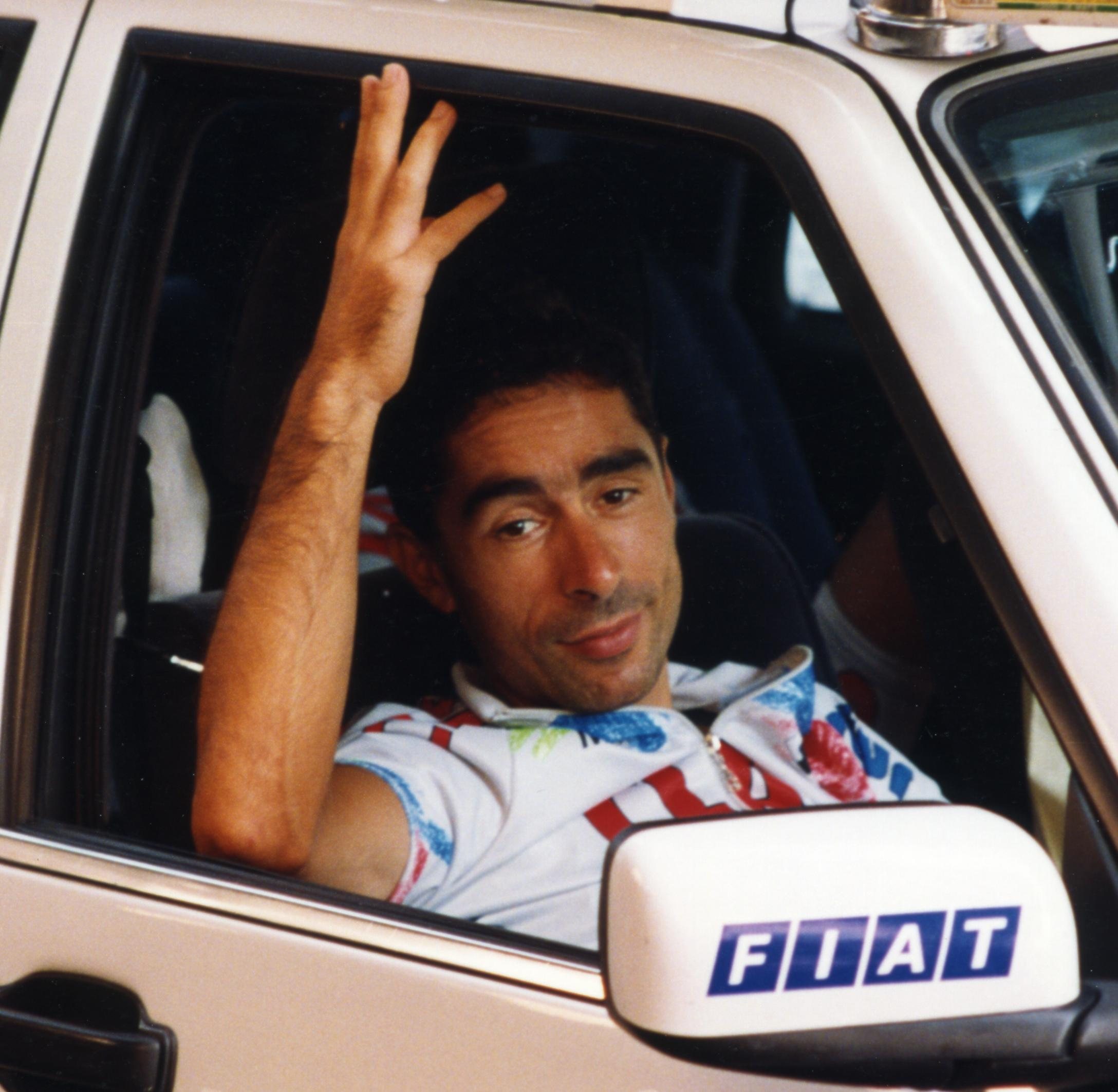
- Unzaga at the 1993 Tour de France

Personal information
- Full name: Jon Unzaga Bombín
- Born: August 20, 1962 (age 64) Laudio/Llodio, Spain

Cycling career
- Sport: Cycling
- Current team: Retired
- Discipline: Road
- Role: Rider

Professional teams
- 1987–1988: Kas
- 1989–1991: Seur
- 1992–1993: CLAS–Cajastur
- 1994–1996: Mapei

Major wins
- Vuelta a España, 1 stage Klasika Primavera (1993)

Jon Unzaga Bombín (born August 20, 1962) is a former Spanish professional road racing cyclist.

== Achievements and awards ==
1988
2nd GP Villafranca de Ordizia
1989
7th Overall Euskal Bizikleta
9th Overall Vuelta a Murcia
1990
10th Trofeo Masferrer
1991
1st Stage 4 Euskal Bizikleta
1st Stage 2 Troféu Joaquim Agostinho
3rd Klasika Primavera
1992
1st Stage 8 Vuelta a España
2nd Road race, National Road Championships
4th Overall Euskal Bizikleta
1993
1st Klasika Primavera
6th Vuelta a Murcia
1994
6th Subida al Naranco
1995
6th Overall Vuelta a los Valles Mineros
