= Marino Alonso =

Spanish cyclist (born 1965)

Personal information
- Born: 16 November 1965 (age 60) Zamora, Spain

Cycling career
- Sport: Cycling
- Discipline: Road
- Role: Rider

Professional teams
- 1985: Fagor
- 1986–1989: Teka
- 1990–1998: Banesto

Marino Alonso (born 16 November 1965) is a Spanish former professional racing cyclist. He rode in nine editions of the Tour de France and ten editions of the Vuelta a España. He also rode in the men's road race at the 1996 Summer Olympics.

== Major results ==
1987
1st Stage 7 Volta a Catalunya
1st Stage 2 Euskal Bizikleta
1988
1st Subida al Naranco
2nd Overall Vuelta a La Rioja

1st Stage 4

10th Overall Vuelta a Murcia
1989
1st Overall Vuelta a Murcia
1st Stage 4 Volta a Catalunya
2nd Trofeo Masferrer
1990
1st Stage 4b Vuelta a Cantabria
9th Overall Euskal Bizikleta

1st Stage 2

1992
1st Stage 3 Vuelta a Asturias
1993
1st Stage 5 Vuelta a España
1994
1st Stage 19 Vuelta a España
1st Overall Vuelta a Aragón
1st Trofeo Comunidad Foral de Navarra
2nd Time trial, National Road Championships
1995
1st Trofeo Luis Ocaña
10th Overall Vuelta a los Valles Mineros
1997
1st Trofeo Luis Ocaña
3rd Overall Vuelta a los Valles Mineros

1st Stage 2

9th Overall Volta a Catalunya

=== Grand Tour general classification results timeline ===
Grand Tour	1988	1989	1990	1991	1992	1993	1994	1995	1996	1997	1998
Giro d'Italia	—	—	—	—	—	—	—	—	—	—	—
Tour de France	—	—	96	123	98	72	DNF	78	66	61	DNF
Vuelta a España	DNF	28	75	56	94	21	34	46	57	35	—
