= Erik Breukink =

Dutch cyclist (born 1964)

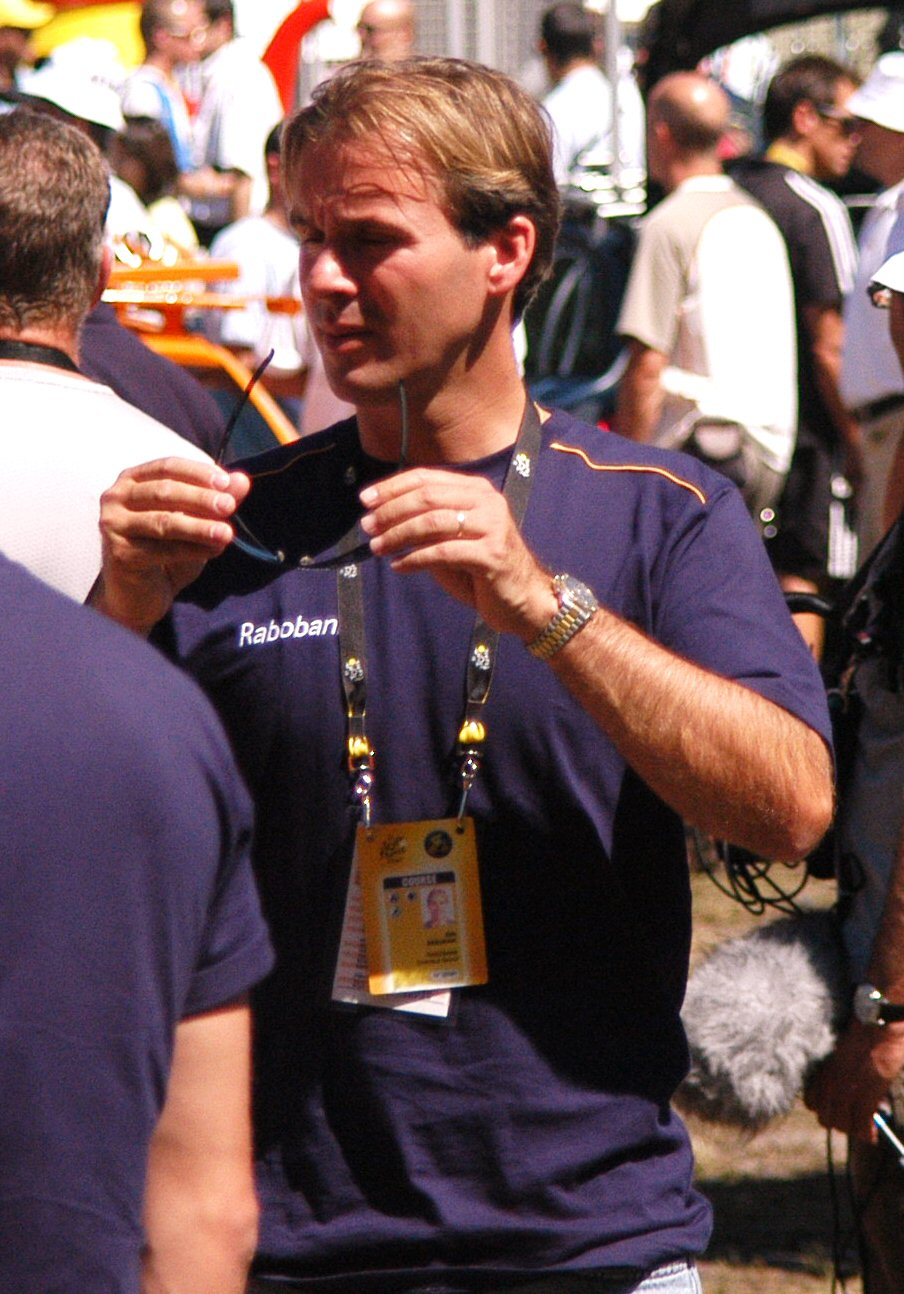
- Breukink at the 2007 Tour de France

Personal information
- Full name: Erik Breukink
- Born: 1 April 1964 (age 62) Rheden, the Netherlands
- Height: 1.85 m (6 ft 1 in)
- Weight: 70 kg (154 lb; 11 st 0 lb)

Cycling career
- Sport: Cycling
- Discipline: Road
- Role: Rider (retired); Team manager
- Rider type: All-rounder

Professional teams
- 1985: Skala-Gazelle
- 1986–1989: Panasonic–Merckx–Agu
- 1990–1992: PDM–Concorde–Ultima
- 1993–1995: ONCE
- 1996–1997: Rabobank

Managerial team
- 2004–2012: Rabobank

Major wins
- Grand Tours Tour de France Young rider classification (1988) 4 individual stages (1987, 1989, 1990) 1 TTT stage (1988) Giro d'Italia 2 individual stages (1987, 1988) Vuelta a España 1 individual stage (1992) Stage Races Critérium International (1988, 1993) Tour of the Basque Country (1988) One-day races and Classics National Road Race Championships (1993) National Time Trial Championships (1995, 1997) Giro del Piemonte (1992)

Erik Breukink (born 1 April 1964) is a former Dutch professional road racing cyclist. In 1988, Breukink won the youth competition in the Tour de France. In 1990, finished 3rd in the 1990 Tour de France. Most recently, he served as the manager of the Rabobank team.

== Biography ==
=== Amateur cycling years ===
Born in Rheden, Breukink was born in a cycling family, as his father Willem Breukink was director of the Gazelle bicycle factory. Despite this, he chose to be a footballer. In 1980 he changed to pursue a cycling career. In 1982, this appeared to be a good choice, when he won the Dutch national pursuit championship for juniors. At the 1984 Olympic Games, Erik Breukink competed with Gert Jakobs, Maarten Ducrot and Jos Alberts in the 100 km Team Pursuit and finish fourth place. In 1985, Breukink won 2 time trial stages in Olympia's Tour, and finished 3rd place overall. He decided to switch to a professional career.

=== Professional cycling years ===
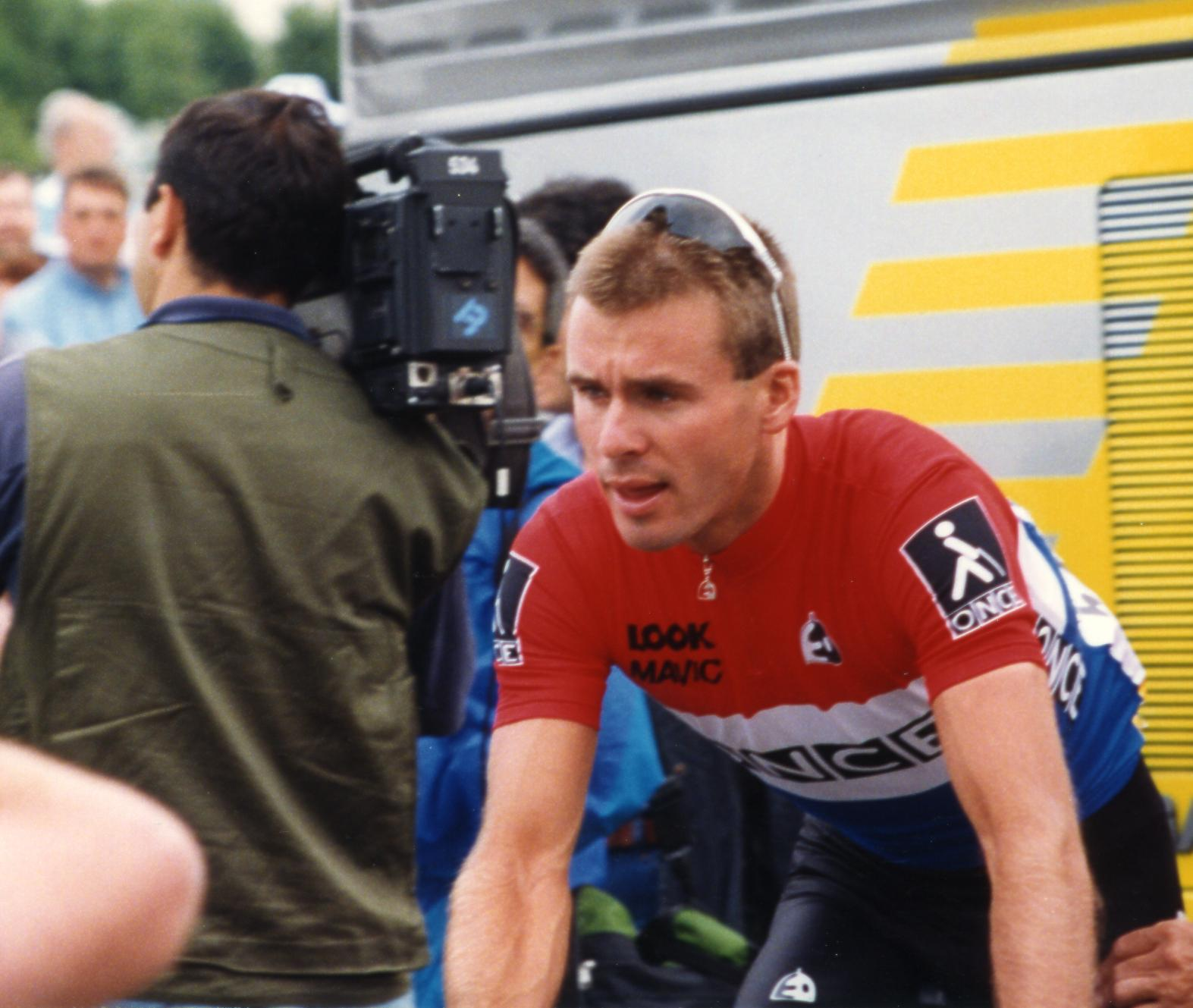
Breukink in the jersey of the Dutch national champion at the 1993 Tour de France

Breukink made his debut as a pro in 1986 for the Skala-Gazelle team. He turned out to be a time trial specialist and was a good climber. In his Tour de France debut in 1987, he won one stage and finished second in the young rider classification. His real breakthrough in the major courses was the 1988 Giro d'Italia, where he debuted with a 2nd place, winning the Gavia Pass stage in a snowstorm. In the 1988 Tour de France he won the young rider classification and finished 13th place. In the 1989 Tour de France, he showed his time trial skills by winning the prologue, and wearing the yellow jersey for one day. In that year's Giro d'Italia, he almost won, but lost the lead in the Dolomites due to hunger. In 1990, Breukink wanted to focus on the Tour de France, so he switched to the PDM team, that allowed him to do so. In the 1990 Tour de France, the result was good, winning two stages and finishing 3rd overall. The result could even have been better, but Breukink suffered from some bad luck: in the climb to the Tourmalet Breukink had to switch bicycles three times. In 1991, Breukink together with the entire PDM-team had to leave the tour ranked 3rd, officially due to food poisoning, but it was later exposed that it was due to Intralipid. In 1992, he appeared weak, especially in his favourite time trials. In 1993, Breukink switched to the ONCE team, where his performance improved again. Bad luck followed him however, as just before the start of the 1993 Tour de France, he was hit by a car test riding the new Lotus 110. The damage to his left knee caused him to give up during the Tour. Breukink rode the Tour de France four times afterwards, but never reached his old level. In 1997 he ended his professional cycling career, having ridden 11 Tours de France and won 4 stages. He garnered 61 career victories in total.

=== Sports commentator ===
After one year as a Public Relations officer for the Rabobank-team, Breukink started as co-commentator for the NOS, covering the Tour de France. In 2002 and 2003, the GP Erik Breukink, a UCI level 2.3 course, was run, with Erik Dekker and Fabian Cancellara as winners, but it was discontinued in 2004 due to financial problems.

=== Team manager ===
On 13 January 2004, it was announced that Erik Breukink started as a team manager for the Rabobank team. Thanks to his ONCE-years, Erik Breukink speaks Spanish fluently, which is helpful to communicate with the Spanish cyclists in the Rabobank team and cyclist Denis Menchov, who also speaks Spanish better than English. Since Breukink became team manager, the Rabobank cycling team's successes have included Paris–Tours, Milan–San Remo, the Brabantse Pijl (3×), the Tirreno–Adriatico (2×), the Tour de Romandie, the final classification and three stages in the Vuelta a España, 6 stages in the Tour de France and the mountains classification (2×) in the Tour de France. On, 20 July 2006, Breukink received the "médaille de la fidélité" from the Tour de France organisation, because he had been present in the Tour de France for 20 years. (11 times as rider, 1 time as PR-officer, 5 times as sports commentator and 3 times as team manager).

== Career achievements ==
=== Major results ===
1982
1st Team pursuit, National Track Championships
1984
3rd Overall Olympia's Tour

1st Stage 7a

1985
Olympia's Tour

1st Prologue & Stage 7a

1st Stage 4b Tour de Liège
1986
1st Stage 4 Tour de Suisse
1987
1st Stage 13 Tour de France
3rd Overall Giro d'Italia

1st Stage 1a
Held after Stages 1a–2
Held after Stages 1a–3
Held after Stages 1a & 1b

4th Grand Prix Eddy Merckx
4th Circuit des Frontières
6th Nokere Koerse
1988
1st Overall Tour of the Basque Country

1st Stages 5a & 5b (ITT)

1st Overall Critérium International

1st Stage 3 (ITT)

1st Omloop van het Waasland
Tour de France

1st Young rider classification
1st Stage 2 (TTT)

2nd Overall Giro d'Italia

1st Stage 14

2nd Overall Ronde van Nederland
1989
1st Overall Escalada a Montjuïc

1st Stages 1a & 1b (ITT)

Tour de Romandie

1st Prologue & Stage 4b

Tour de France

1st Prologue
Held & after Prologue

1st Stage 6b (ITT) Volta a Catalunya
4th Overall Giro d'Italia

Held after Stages 8 & 10–13

7th Overall Nissan Classic
9th Milano–Torino
1990
1st Overall Nissan Classic

1st Stage 2a (ITT)

1st Stage 4 (ITT) Tour de Suisse
1st Stage 8 (ITT) Tirreno–Adriatico
1st Stage 7a (ITT) Volta a Catalunya
1st Stage 1b (ITT) Vuelta a Asturias
1st Grand Prix de la Libération (TTT)
2nd Overall Ronde van Nederland
3rd Overall Tour de France

1st Stages 12 (ITT) & 20 (ITT)

3rd Overall Tour DuPont
10th Overall Tour of the Basque Country
1991
1st Overall Tour DuPont

1st Prologue & Stage 11

1st Grand Prix Eddy Merckx
1st Stage 8 (ITT) Tirreno–Adriatico
2nd Grand Prix des Nations
3rd Overall Escalada a Montjuïc
3rd Overall Vuelta a Asturias
3rd Road race, National Road Championships
5th Overall Critérium International
1992
1st Giro del Piemonte
Tirreno–Adriatico

1st Prologue & 7 (ITT)

1st Stage 7 (ITT) Vuelta a España
2nd Overall Volta a la Comunitat Valenciana
3rd Road race, National Road Championships
6th Overall Ronde van Nederland
7th Overall Tour de France
7th Overall Tour de Suisse
8th Overall Tour of the Basque Country
1993
1st Road race, National Road Championships
1st Overall Critérium International

1st Stage 3 (ITT)

1st Overall Ronde van Nederland

1st Stage 3b (ITT)

1st Overall Vuelta a Asturias

1st Stage 1

1st Stage 2 Volta a la Comunitat Valenciana
4th La Flèche Wallonne
5th Overall Paris–Nice
7th Overall Vuelta a España
8th Overall Tour of the Basque Country
1994
4th Time trial, UCI Road World Championships
8th Overall Volta a Catalunya
8th Overall Ronde van Nederland
1995
1st Time trial, National Road Championships
2nd Overall Vuelta a Murcia
2nd Subida a Urkiola
4th Overall Critérium International
5th Overall Ronde van Nederland
6th Time trial, UCI Road World Championships
1996
1st Druivenkoers Overijse
3rd Overall Tour de Luxembourg
7th Overall Ronde van Nederland
1997
National Road Championships

1st Time trial
2nd Road race

3rd Overall Tour de Luxembourg
5th Overall Ronde van Nederland
5th Grand Prix des Nations
7th Time trial, UCI Road World Championships

=== Grand Tour general classification results timeline ===
Grand Tour	1986	1987	1988	1989	1990	1991	1992	1993	1994	1995	1996	1997
Giro d'Italia	71	3	2	4	—	—	—	—	—	59	—	—
Tour de France	—	21	12	DNF	3	DNF	7	DNF	29	20	34	52
Vuelta a España	—	—	—	—	—	—	27	7	19	—	—	—

== See also ==
- List of Dutch Olympic cyclists
- List of Dutch cyclists who have led the Tour de France general classification

Awards
Preceded by Leo Visser	Dutch Sportsman of the Year; 1990	Succeeded by Edwin Jongejans; Arnold Vanderlyde
Sporting positions
Preceded by Tristan Hoffman	Dutch National Road Race Champion; 1993	Succeeded by Steven Rooks
Preceded by Mario Gutte; Erik Dekker	Dutch National Time Trial Champion; 1995; 1997	Succeeded by Erik Dekker; Patrick Jonker
