= Juan Carlos González Salvador =

Spanish cyclist

Personal information
- Full name: Juan Carlos González Salvador
- Born: 28 January 1964 (age 62) Bilbao, Spain

Cycling career
- Sport: Cycling
- Current team: Retired
- Discipline: Road
- Role: Rider

Professional teams
- 1987–1988: Kas
- 1989–1990: Reynolds
- 1991–1992: Puertas Mavisa
- 1993: Eldor–Viner
- 1994–1995: Euskadi–Petronor

Juan Carlos González Salvador (born 28 January 1964 in Bilbao) is a Spanish former cyclist.

== Major results ==
1987
1st National Road Race Championships
1st Stage 1 Étoile de Bessèges
1988
1st Stage 4 Vuelta a Aragón
1st Stage 6 Vuelta a Asturias
3rd Vuelta a La Rioja
1990
1st Stage 1b Vuelta a Venezuela
2nd Clásica de Sabiñánigo
1991
1st National Road Race Championships
2nd Overall Vuelta a Castilla y León
1992
1st Trofeo Soller
1st Stage 1b Vuelta a Castilla y León
2nd Clásica Internacional de Alcobendas
1993
1st Stage 10 Vuelta a España
2nd Trofeo Luis Puig
