= Fabrizio Bontempi =

Italian cyclist (born 1966)

Personal information
- Born: 1 November 1966 (age 59) Brescia, Italy

Cycling career
- Sport: Cycling
- Current team: Retired
- Discipline: Road
- Role: Rider

Fabrizio Bontempi (born 1 November 1966) is an Italian cyclist. He competed in the road race at the 1988 Summer Olympics.
