= Laudelino Cubino =

Spanish cyclist (born 1963)

Personal information
- Full name: Laudelino Cubino González
- Nickname: Lale Cubino
- Born: 31 May 1963 (age 63) Béjar, Spain

Cycling career
- Sport: Cycling
- Discipline: Road
- Role: Rider

Professional team
- 1986–1993: Zor–BH
- 1994–1996: Kelme–Avianca–Gios

Major wins
- Grand Tours Tour de France 1 individual stage (1988) Giro d'Italia 2 individual stages (1994, 1995) Vuelta a España 3 individual stages (1987, 1991, 1992) Stage races Volta a Catalunya (1990) One-day races and Classics National Road Race Championships (1990)

Laudelino Cubino González (born 31 May 1963) is a Spanish former professional road racing cyclist. He was born in Béjar, Spain.

== Major results ==
1986
1st Clásica a los Puertos de Guadarrama
6th Subida al Naranco
10th Overall Tour de la Communauté Européenne

1st Stage 7

1987
1st Stage 7 Vuelta a España
5th Trofeo Masferrer
9th Overall Vuelta a Murcia
10th Overall Vuelta a Burgos
1988
1st Clásica a los Puertos de Guadarrama
1st Stage 15 Tour de France
1st Stage 4a Vuelta a los Valles Mineros
2nd Overall Volta a Catalunya
3rd Overall Vuelta a Burgos

1st Stage 4

4th Overall Vuelta a España

Held after Stages 2–15

9th Trofeo Luis Puig
1989
1st Overall Vuelta a los Valles Mineros

1st Stage 1

1st Stage 4 Vuelta a Asturias
1st Stage 1 Tour of Galicia
1st Stage 3 (TTT) Vuelta a Burgos
4th Overall Volta a Catalunya
1990
1st Road race, National Road Championships
1st Overall Volta a Catalunya
1st Subida al Naranco
2nd Overall Tour of Galicia

1st Stage 3

4th Overall Vuelta a Burgos
9th Overall Escalada a Montjuïc
1991
1st Stage 17 Vuelta a España
1st Stage 9 Vuelta a Colombia
2nd Overall Critérium du Dauphiné Libéré

1st Stage 7

3rd Subida al Naranco
3rd Clásica a los Puertos de Guadarrama
5th Overall Escalada a Montjuïc
7th Overall Setmana Catalana de Ciclisme
1992
1st Stage 5 Critérium du Dauphiné Libéré
2nd Clásica a los Puertos de Guadarrama
3rd Subida al Naranco
6th Overall Vuelta a España

1st Stage 9

6th Overall Vuelta a Murcia

1st Stage 5

8th Overall Tour of Galicia
9th Overall Vuelta a Burgos
1993
1st Overall Vuelta a Burgos

1st Stage 2

1st Stage 3 Vuelta a Aragón
2nd Overall Vuelta a Murcia
2nd Overall Setmana Catalana de Ciclisme
3rd Overall Vuelta a España
1994
1st Overall Tour of Galicia

1st Stage 1

1st Stage 7 Giro d'Italia
2nd Overall Vuelta a Burgos
2nd Clásica a los Puertos de Guadarrama
8th Road race, UCI Road World Championships
1995
1st Stage 8 Giro d'Italia
3rd Overall Vuelta a Aragón
3rd Overall Vuelta a La Rioja

1st Stage 2

1996
1st Stage 1 Vuelta a Colombia
5th Overall Volta a Catalunya

1st Mountains classification

=== Grand Tour general classification results timeline ===
Grand Tour	1986	1987	1988	1989	1990	1991	1992	1993	1994	1995	1996
Vuelta a España	—	DNF	4	—	—	15	6	3	DNF	—	—
Giro d'Italia	—	—	—	—	—	—	—	—	DNF	40	—
Tour de France	—	DNF	13	DNF	—	—	DNF	42	DNF	27	DNF

Legend
—	Did not compete
DNF	Did not finish
