= Roberto Pelliconi =

Italian cyclist

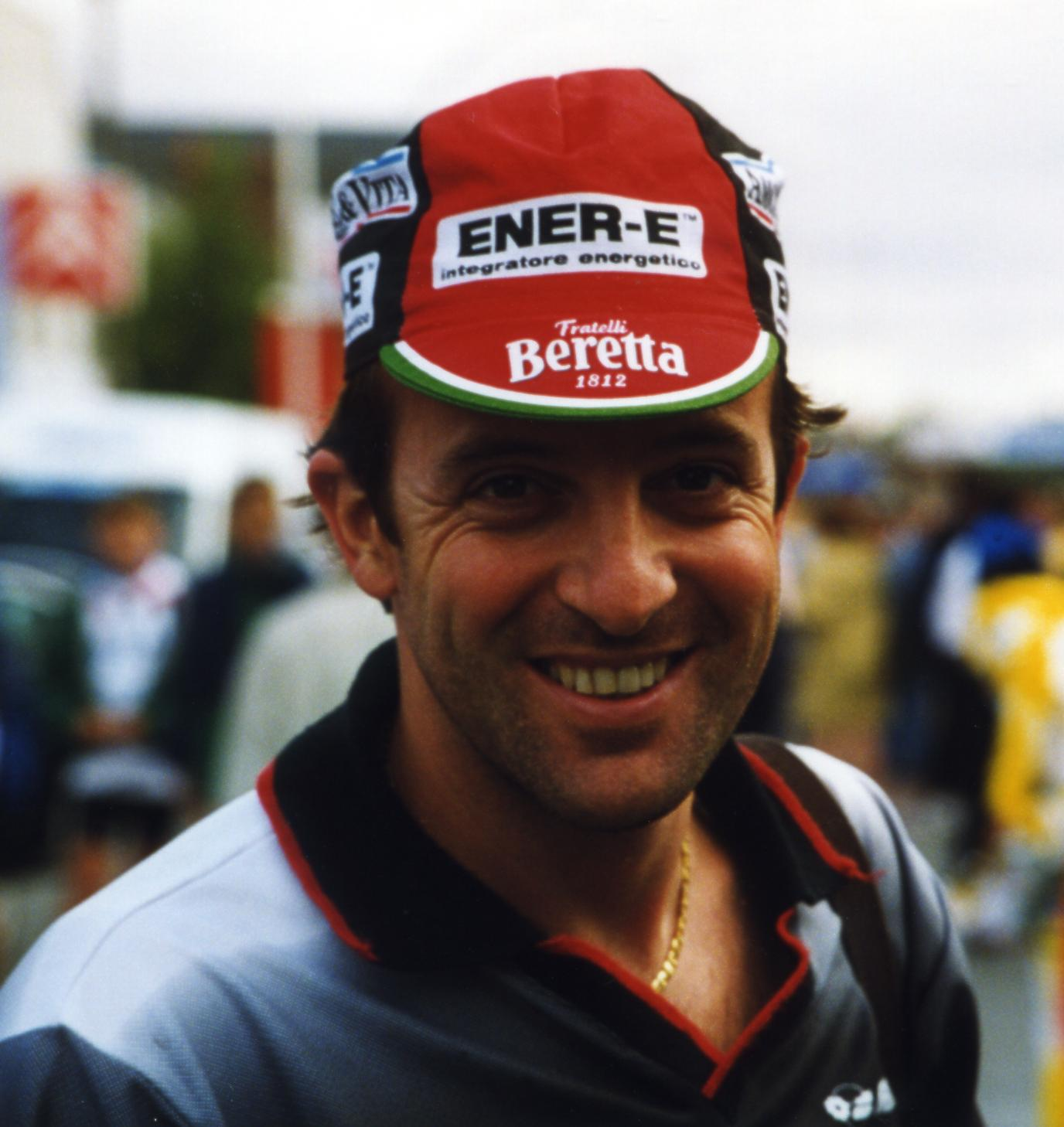

Personal information
- Born: 14 November 1962 (age 63) Imola, Italy

Cycling career
- Sport: Cycling
- Current team: Retired
- Discipline: Road
- Role: Rider

Professional teams
- 1989: Polli-Mobiexport
- 1990–1992: Amore & Vita-Fanini
- 1992–1993: Mercatone Uno
- 1994: Brescialat-Refin
- 1995: Ceramiche Refin
- 1996: Amore & Vita-Galatron

Roberto Pelliconi (born 14 November 1962) is a former Italian racing cyclist. He rode at the 1988 Summer Olympics and participated in eight Grand Tours.

== Palmares ==
1984
1st Coppa Collecchio
1988
7th Olympic Road Race
1989
1st Trofeo Matteotti
3rd New Jersey National Bank Classic
1990
2nd Gran Premio Città di Camaiore
2nd National Road Race Championships
1992
1st First Union Invitational
3rd Milano-Vignola
1993
2nd Coca-Cola Trophy
3rd Grand Prix du Midi Libre
