= Jesús Montoya =

Spanish cyclist (born 1963)

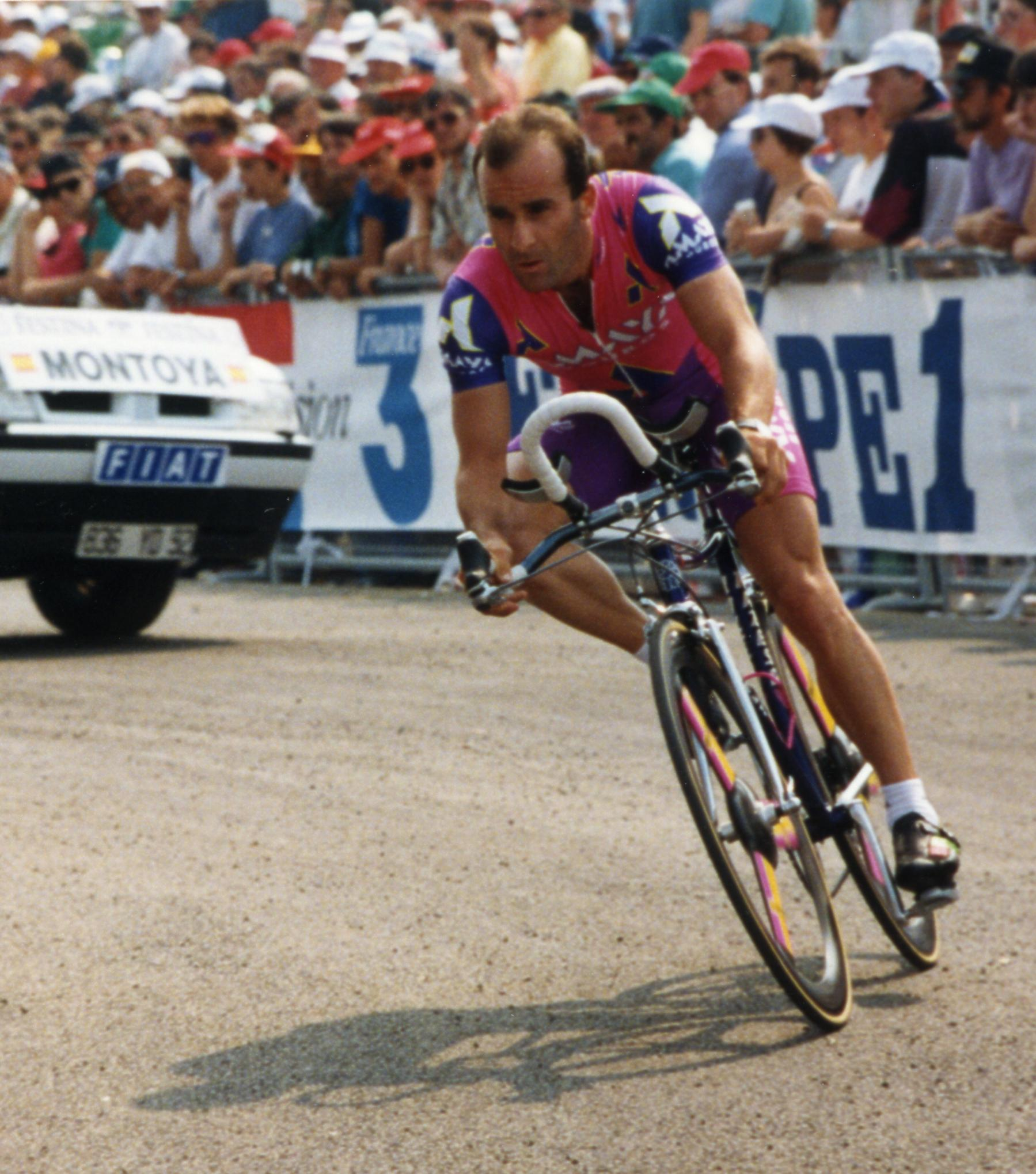
- Montoya at the 1993 Tour de France

Personal information
- Full name: Jesús Montoya Alarcon
- Born: 4 December 1963 (age 62) Cabezo de Torres, Spain

Cycling career
- Sport: Cycling
- Discipline: Road
- Role: Rider

Professional teams
- 1987–1988: Kas
- 1989: Teka
- 1990–1993: BH–Amaya Seguros
- 1994–1995: Banesto
- 1996: Motorola

Major wins
- Grand Tours Vuelta a España 2 individual stages (1991, 1993) Single-day races and Classics National Road Race Championships (1995)

Jesús Montoya Alarcon (born 4 December 1963) is a Spanish former road bicycle racer.

== Major results ==
1986
1st Overall Circuito Montañés
2nd Overall Vuelta al Bidasoa
3rd Overall Vuelta a Navarra
1987
6th Overall Vuelta a Murcia
1990
1st Overall Vuelta a los Valles Mineros
1st Stage 4 Volta a Catalunya
5th Overall Euskal Bizikleta
1991
1st Klasika Primavera
1st Stage 19 Vuelta a España
3rd Subida a Urkiola
6th Overall Vuelta a Murcia
1992
2nd Overall Vuelta a España
2nd Overall Vuelta a Andalucía

1st Stage 4

3rd Overall Vuelta a Asturias
4th Overall Paris–Nice
1993
1st Subida al Naranco
5th Overall Vuelta a España

1st Stage 15

8th Overall Volta a Catalunya
1994
1st Stage 6 Setmana Catalana de Ciclisme
2nd Overall Paris–Nice
2nd Klasika Primavera
1995
1st Road race, National Road Championships
3rd Overall Volta a Catalunya
10th Overall Tour de Romandie
1996
6th Overall Tour of the Basque Country
