= Oliverio Rincón =

Colombian cyclist

Personal information
- Full name: Oliverio Rincón Quintana
- Born: 24 April 1968 (age 58) Duitama, Boyacá, Colombia

Cycling career
- Sport: Cycling
- Current team: Retired
- Discipline: Road
- Role: Rider
- Rider type: Climbing specialist

Professional teams
- 1990: Postobón–Manzana–Ryalcao
- 1991–1992: Kelme–Ibexpress
- 1993: Amaya Seguros
- 1994–1996: ONCE
- 1998: Vitalicio Seguros

Major wins
- Grand Tours Tour de France 1 individual stage (1993) Giro d'Italia 1 individual stage (1995) Vuelta a España 2 individual stages (1993, 1996) Stage races Vuelta a Colombia (1989) Escalada a Montjuïc (1991)

Oliverio Rincón Quintana (born 24 April 1968) is a Colombian former road bicycle racer. He is the older brother of Daniel Rincón.

== Major results ==
1988
4th Overall Clásico RCN

1st Stage 8

1989
1st Overall Vuelta a Colombia

1st Stages 5 & 7

3rd Overall Clásico RCN
1990
10th Overall Critérium du Dauphiné Libéré
1991
1st Overall Escalada a Montjuïc

1st Stages 1 & 2

1st Stage 6 Vuelta a Burgos
2nd Subida al Naranco
5th Overall Critérium du Dauphiné Libéré
5th Overall Setmana Catalana de Ciclisme
6th Overall Vuelta a Colombia
8th Overall Volta a Catalunya
10th Overall Vuelta a España
10th Ov3rall Vuelta a Murcia
1992
3rd Overall Escalada a Montjuïc
3rd Overall Tour of Galicia
3rd Giro della Provincia di reggio Calabria
1993
2nd Overall Critérium du Dauphiné Libéré

1st Stage 6

1st Stage 15 Tour de France
1st Stage 5 Vuelta a Aragón
2nd Subida al Naranco
3rd Overall Escalada a Montjuïc
4th Overall Vuelta a España

1st Stage 17

7th Overall Volta a Catalunya
1994
1st Classique des Alpes
5th Overall Vuelta a España
9th Subida al Naranco
1995
4th Overall Vuelta a los Valles Mineros
5th Overall Giro d'Italia

1st Stage 14

6th Overall Tour de Romandie
8th Road race, UCI Road World Championships
1996
1st Stage 17 Vuelta a España

=== Grand Tour general classification results timeline ===
| Grand Tour | 1991 | 1992 | 1993 | 1994 | 1995 | 1996 | 1997 | 1998 |
|---|---|---|---|---|---|---|---|---|
| Giro d'Italia | — | — | — | — | 5 | — | — | — |
| Tour de France | — | — | 14 | DNF | — | — | — | DNF |
| Vuelta a España | 10 | DNF | 4 | 5 | 52 | 49 | — | — |
