= List of teams and cyclists in the 1995 Vuelta a España =

For the 1995 Vuelta a España, the field consisted of 180 riders; 118 finished the race.

== By rider ==
Legend
No.	Starting number worn by the rider during the Vuelta
Pos.	Position in the general classification
DNF	Denotes a rider who did not finish

No.	Name	Nationality	Team	Pos.	Ref
1	Adriano Baffi	Italy	Mapei–GB–Latexco	67	
2	Manuel Beltrán	Spain	Mapei–GB–Latexco	41	
3	Bart Leysen	Belgium	Mapei–GB–Latexco	78	
4	Stefano Della Santa	Italy	Mapei–GB–Latexco	10	
5	Federico Echave	Spain	Mapei–GB–Latexco	18	
6	Jon Unzaga	Spain	Mapei–GB–Latexco	DNF	
7	Manuel Fernández	Spain	Mapei–GB–Latexco	DNF	
8	Abraham Olano	Spain	Mapei–GB–Latexco	2	
9	Miguel Ángel Peña	Spain	Mapei–GB–Latexco	35	
11	Daniel Clavero	Spain	Artiach	8	
12	Félix García Casas	Spain	Artiach	12	
13	Ramón García España	Spain	Artiach	19	
14	Orlando Rodrigues	Portugal	Artiach	14	
15	José Manuel García	Spain	Artiach	34	
16	Manuel Pascual	Spain	Artiach	23	
17	Asiat Saitov	Russia	Artiach	52	
18	Antonio Sánchez	Spain	Artiach	44	
19	José Luis Santamaría	Spain	Artiach	DNF	
21	José Ramón Uriarte	Spain	Banesto	63	
22	Ángel Casero	Spain	Banesto	13	
23	David García	Spain	Banesto	7	
24	Marino Alonso	Spain	Banesto	46	
25	Erwin Nijboer	Netherlands	Banesto	74	
26	Carmelo Miranda	Spain	Banesto	51	
27	José Ramón Gonzalez Arrieta	Spain	Banesto	DNF	
28	Jesús Montoya	Spain	Banesto	37	
29	Vicente Aparicio	Spain	Banesto	DNF	
31	Marco Pantani	Italy	Carrera Jeans–Tassoni	DNF	
32	Leonardo Sierra	Venezuela	Carrera Jeans–Tassoni	DNF	
33	Remo Rossi	Italy	Carrera Jeans–Tassoni	111	
34	Peter Luttenberger	Austria	Carrera Jeans–Tassoni	DNF	
35	Mario Mantovan	Italy	Carrera Jeans–Tassoni	DNF	
36	Marco Artunghi	Italy	Carrera Jeans–Tassoni	DNF	
37	Filippo Simeoni	Italy	Carrera Jeans–Tassoni	118	
38	Stefano Cembali	Italy	Carrera Jeans–Tassoni	87	
39	Mario Chiesa	Italy	Carrera Jeans–Tassoni	112	
41	Eleuterio Anguita	Spain	Castellblanch	DNF	
42	Francisco Cerezo	Spain	Castellblanch	53	
43	Tom Cordes	Netherlands	Castellblanch	86	
44	José Manuel Uría	Spain	Castellblanch	15	
45	José Antonio Espinosa	Spain	Castellblanch	57	
46	Alfredo Irusta	Spain	Castellblanch	80	
47	Carlos Alberto Maya	Venezuela	Castellblanch	47	
48	Claus Møller	Denmark	Castellblanch	38	
49	Marcel Wüst	Germany	Castellblanch	93	
51	Jean-François Bernard	France	Chazal–König	DNF	
52	Miguel Arroyo	Mexico	Chazal–König	DNF	
53	Jean-Pierre Bourgeot	France	Chazal–König	DNF	
54	Pascal Chanteur	France	Chazal–König	85	
55	Jimmy Delbove	France	Chazal–König	DNF	
56	Gilles Delion	France	Chazal–König	DNF	
57	Martial Locatelli	France	Chazal–König	94	
58	Philippe Louviot	France	Chazal–König	DNF	
59	Bruno Cornillet	France	Chazal–König	DNF	
61	Ibon Ajuria	Spain	Equipo Euskadi	83	
62	Íñigo Cuesta	Spain	Equipo Euskadi	DNF	
63	Thierry Elissalde	France	Equipo Euskadi	DNF	
64	Asier Guenetxea	Spain	Equipo Euskadi	DNF	
65	Álvaro González de Galdeano	Spain	Equipo Euskadi	72	
66	Juan Carlos González	Spain	Equipo Euskadi	DNF	
67	Iñigo González	Spain	Equipo Euskadi	70	
68	Roberto Laiseka	Spain	Equipo Euskadi	76	
69	Roberto Lezaun	Spain	Equipo Euskadi	100	
71	Nicolas Aubier	France	GAN	DNF	
72	Jean-Claude Colotti	France	GAN	DNF	
73	Didier Rous	France	GAN	DNF	
74	Pascal Deramé	France	GAN	DNF	
75	Thierry Gouvenou	France	GAN	97	
76	Pascal Lance	France	GAN	DNF	
77	Arnaud Prétot	France	GAN	81	
78	Eddy Seigneur	France	GAN	DNF	
79	Cédric Vasseur	France	GAN	69	
81	Vladislav Bobrik	Russia	Gewiss–Ballan	DNF	
82	Ermanno Brignoli	Italy	Gewiss–Ballan	28	
83	Ivan Cerioli	Italy	Gewiss–Ballan	DNF	
84	Giorgio Furlan	Italy	Gewiss–Ballan	DNF	
85	Nicola Minali	Italy	Gewiss–Ballan	DNF	
86	Jon Odriozola	Spain	Gewiss–Ballan	DNF	
87	Bjarne Riis	Denmark	Gewiss–Ballan	DNF	
88	Piotr Ugrumov	Latvia	Gewiss–Ballan	22	
89	Stefano Zanini	Italy	Gewiss–Ballan	DNF	
91	Francisco Benítez	Spain	Kelme–Sureña	30	
92	Francisco Cabello	Spain	Kelme–Sureña	64	
93	Juan Carlos Domínguez	Spain	Kelme–Sureña	65	
94	Martín Farfán	Colombia	Kelme–Sureña	DNF	
95	Ignacio García Camacho	Spain	Kelme–Sureña	54	
96	José Rodríguez	Spain	Kelme–Sureña	68	
97	José Luis Sánchez	Spain	Kelme–Sureña	59	
98	Marcos-Antonio Serrano	Spain	Kelme–Sureña	11	
99	José Ángel Vidal	Spain	Kelme–Sureña	77	
101	Richard Virenque	France	Festina–Lotus	5	
102	Pascal Hervé	France	Festina–Lotus	39	
103	Jean-Cyril Robin	France	Festina–Lotus	DNF	
104	Valerio Tebaldi	Italy	Festina–Lotus	56	
105	Roberto Torres	Spain	Festina–Lotus	DNF	
106	Juan Arenas	Spain	Festina–Lotus	36	
107	David Plaza	Spain	Festina–Lotus	16	
108	Joona Laukka	Finland	Festina–Lotus	DNF	
109	Stéphane Goubert	France	Festina–Lotus	26	
111	Frankie Andreu	United States	Motorola	DNF	
112	Kevin Livingston	United States	Motorola	106	
113	George Hincapie	United States	Motorola	110	
114	Álvaro Mejía	Colombia	Motorola	DNF	
115	Axel Merckx	Belgium	Motorola	21	
116	Kaspars Ozers	Latvia	Motorola	101	
117	Andrea Peron	Italy	Motorola	79	
118	Johnny Weltz	Denmark	Motorola	90	
119	Cezary Zamana	Poland	Motorola	109	
121	Djamolidine Abdoujaparov	Uzbekistan	Novell–Decca–Colnago	DNF	
122	Michael Boogerd	Netherlands	Novell–Decca–Colnago	42	
123	Eddy Bouwmans	Netherlands	Novell–Decca–Colnago	27	
124	Viatcheslav Ekimov	Russia	Novell–Decca–Colnago	25	
125	Rob Mulders	Netherlands	Novell–Decca–Colnago	DNF	
126	Dainis Ozols	Latvia	Novell–Decca–Colnago	50	
127	Sven Teutenberg	Germany	Novell–Decca–Colnago	113	
128	Edwig Van Hooydonck	Belgium	Novell–Decca–Colnago	102	
129	Henk Vogels	Australia	Novell–Decca–Colnago	114	
131	Johan Bruyneel	Belgium	ONCE	3	
132	Herminio Díaz Zabala	Spain	ONCE	58	
133	Roberto Sierra	Spain	ONCE	55	
134	Laurent Jalabert	France	ONCE	1	
135	Alberto Leanizbarrutia	Spain	ONCE	43	
136	Melcior Mauri	Spain	ONCE	4	
137	Oliverio Rincón	Colombia	ONCE	62	
138	Neil Stephens	Australia	ONCE	29	
139	Alex Zülle	Switzerland	ONCE	20	
141	Íñigo Chaurreau	Spain	Polti–Granarolo–Santini	84	
142	Mauro Gianetti	Switzerland	Polti–Granarolo–Santini	17	
143	Mirco Gualdi	Italy	Polti–Granarolo–Santini	DNF	
144	Mirko Crepaldi	Italy	Polti–Granarolo–Santini	91	
145	Serguei Outschakov	Ukraine	Polti–Granarolo–Santini	DNF	
146	Oscar Pelliccioli	Italy	Polti–Granarolo–Santini	24	
147	Gianluca Pianegonda	Italy	Polti–Granarolo–Santini	DNF	
148	Roberto Pistore	Italy	Polti–Granarolo–Santini	6	
149	Mario Scirea	Italy	Polti–Granarolo–Santini	DNF	
151	Michele Bartoli	Italy	Mercatone Uno–Saeco	9	
152	Ruggero Borghi	Italy	Mercatone Uno–Saeco	60	
153	Simone Biasci	Italy	Mercatone Uno–Saeco	DNF	
154	Paolo Fornaciari	Italy	Mercatone Uno–Saeco	66	
155	Eros Poli	Italy	Mercatone Uno–Saeco	105	
156	Rosario Fina	Italy	Mercatone Uno–Saeco	49	
157	Giuseppe Calcaterra	Italy	Mercatone Uno–Saeco	115	
158	Giuseppe Petito	Italy	Mercatone Uno–Saeco	71	
159	Antonio Politano	Italy	Mercatone Uno–Saeco	DNF	
161	Romes Gainetdinov	Russia	Santa Clara–Cadena Master	61	
162	Jordi Gilabert	Spain	Santa Clara–Cadena Master	DNF	
163	Javier Pascual Rodríguez	Spain	Santa Clara–Cadena Master	96	
164	Manuel Rodríguez Gil	Spain	Santa Clara–Cadena Master	33	
165	Eloy Santamarta	Spain	Santa Clara–Cadena Master	DNF	
166	Dimitri Tcherkachine	Russia	Santa Clara–Cadena Master	95	
167	José Francisco Jarque	Spain	Santa Clara–Cadena Master	82	
168	Iñaki Aiarzagüena	Spain	Santa Clara–Cadena Master	40	
169	Andrei Zintchenko	Russia	Santa Clara–Cadena Master	DNF	
171	Manuel Abreu Campos	Portugal	Sicasal–Acral	75	
172	Michael Andersson	Sweden	Sicasal–Acral	98	
173	Vítor Gamito	Portugal	Sicasal–Acral	DNF	
174	Joaquim Gomes	Portugal	Sicasal–Acral	DNF	
175	Carlos Pinho	Portugal	Sicasal–Acral	88	
176	Carlos Carneiro	Portugal	Sicasal–Acral	DNF	
177	Gonçalo Amorim	Portugal	Sicasal–Acral	DNF	
178	Serafim Vieira	Portugal	Sicasal–Acral	73	
179	Ricardo Felgueiras	Portugal	Sicasal–Acral	DNF	
181	Rolf Aldag	Germany	Team Telekom	DNF	
182	Gerd Audehm	Germany	Team Telekom	DNF	
183	Bert Dietz	Germany	Team Telekom	32	
184	Christian Henn	Germany	Team Telekom	45	
185	Kai Hundertmarck	Germany	Team Telekom	89	
186	Mario Kummer	Germany	Team Telekom	107	
187	Jan Ullrich	Germany	Team Telekom	DNF	
188	Steffen Wesemann	Germany	Team Telekom	99	
189	Erik Zabel	Germany	Team Telekom	DNF	
191	Jeroen Blijlevens	Netherlands	TVM–Polis Direct	DNF	
192	Tristan Hoffman	Netherlands	TVM–Polis Direct	116	
193	Peter Meinert	Denmark	TVM–Polis Direct	31	
194	Peter Van Petegem	Belgium	TVM–Polis Direct	104	
195	Roland Meier	Switzerland	TVM–Polis Direct	108	
196	Raymond Thebes	Netherlands	TVM–Polis Direct	117	
197	Servais Knaven	Netherlands	TVM–Polis Direct	103	
198	Jesper Skibby	Denmark	TVM–Polis Direct	48	
199	Martin van Steen	Netherlands	TVM–Polis Direct	92	
