= 1995 Vuelta a España, Stage 11 to Stage 21 =

Cycling race stages

The 1995 Vuelta a España was the 50th edition of the Vuelta a España, one of cycling's Grand Tours. The Vuelta began with a prologue individual time trial in Zaragoza on 2 September, and Stage 11 occurred on 13 September with a stage from Seville. The race finished in Madrid on 24 September.

== Stage 11 ==
13 September 1995 — Seville to Marbella, 187 km (116 mi)

Stage 11 result

Rank	Rider	Team	Time
1	Nicola Minali (ITA)	Gewiss–Ballan	4h 18' 12"
2	Marcel Wüst (GER)	Castellblanch	s.t.
3	Asiat Saitov (RUS)	Artiach–Chiquilin	s.t.
4	Erik Zabel (GER)	Team Telekom	s.t.
5	Adriano Baffi (ITA)	Mapei–GB–Latexco	s.t.
6	Marco Pantani (ITA)	Carrera Jeans–Tassoni	s.t.
7	Juan Carlos González (ESP)	Equipo Euskadi	s.t.
8	Michele Bartoli (ITA)	Mercatone Uno–Saeco	s.t.
9	Juan Carlos Domínguez (ESP)	Kelme–Sureña	s.t.
10	Martin van Steen (NED)	TVM–Polis Direct	s.t.

General classification after Stage 11

Rank	Rider	Team	Time
1	Laurent Jalabert (FRA)	ONCE	49h 28' 18"
2	Abraham Olano (ESP)	Mapei–GB–Latexco	+ 5' 12"
3	Johan Bruyneel (BEL)	ONCE	+ 6' 24"
4	Melcior Mauri (ESP)	ONCE	+ 6' 35"
5	Alex Zülle (SUI)	ONCE	+ 7' 45"
6	Orlando Rodrigues (POR)	Artiach–Chiquilin	+ 8' 31"
7	Richard Virenque (FRA)	Festina–Lotus	+ 8' 46"
8	Roberto Pistore (ITA)	Polti–Granarolo–Santini	+ 8' 49"
9	Michele Bartoli (ITA)	Mercatone Uno–Saeco	+ 8' 51"
10	Peter Meinert (DEN)	TVM–Polis Direct	+ 9' 53"

== Stage 12 ==
14 September 1995 — Marbella to Sierra Nevada, 238 km (148 mi)

Stage 12 result

Rank	Rider	Team	Time
1	Bert Dietz (GER)	Team Telekom	6h 52' 20"
2	Laurent Jalabert (FRA)	ONCE	s.t.
3	Abraham Olano (ESP)	Mapei–GB–Latexco	+ 2"
4	Johan Bruyneel (BEL)	ONCE	+ 4"
5	Michele Bartoli (ITA)	Mercatone Uno–Saeco	+ 5"
6	Stefano Della Santa (ITA)	Mapei–GB–Latexco	s.t.
7	Melcior Mauri (ESP)	ONCE	s.t.
8	Roberto Pistore (ITA)	Polti–Granarolo–Santini	s.t.
9	Marcos-Antonio Serrano (ESP)	Kelme–Sureña	s.t.
10	David García (ESP)	Banesto	s.t.

General classification after Stage 12

Rank	Rider	Team	Time
1	Laurent Jalabert (FRA)	ONCE	56h 20' 30"
2	Abraham Olano (ESP)	Mapei–GB–Latexco	+ 5' 18"
3	Johan Bruyneel (BEL)	ONCE	+ 6' 36"
4	Melcior Mauri (ESP)	ONCE	+ 6' 48"
5	Roberto Pistore (ITA)	Polti–Granarolo–Santini	+ 9' 02"
6	Michele Bartoli (ITA)	Mercatone Uno–Saeco	+ 9' 04"
7	Richard Virenque (FRA)	Festina–Lotus	+ 9' 09"
8	Daniel Clavero (ESP)	Artiach–Chiquilin	+ 10' 08"
9	Félix García Casas (ESP)	Artiach–Chiquilin	+ 10' 13"
10	David García (ESP)	Banesto	+ 10' 26"

== Stage 13 ==
15 September 1995 — Olula del Río to Murcia, 181 km (112 mi)

Stage 13 result

Rank	Rider	Team	Time
1	Christian Henn (GER)	Team Telekom	4h 01' 07"
2	Manuel Rodríguez Gil (ESP)	Santa Clara-Cadena Master	s.t.
3	Eros Poli (ITA)	Mercatone Uno–Saeco	s.t.
4	Pascal Hervé (FRA)	Festina–Lotus	s.t.
5	José Rodríguez (ESP)	Kelme–Sureña	s.t.
6	Álvaro González de Galdeano (ESP)	Equipo Euskadi	+ 9' 44"
7	Marcel Wüst (GER)	Castellblanch	+ 9' 47"
8	Adriano Baffi (ITA)	Mapei–GB–Latexco	s.t.
9	Steffen Wesemann (GER)	Team Telekom	s.t.
10	Asiat Saitov (RUS)	Artiach–Chiquilin	s.t.

General classification after Stage 13

Rank	Rider	Team	Time
1	Laurent Jalabert (FRA)	ONCE	60h 31' 24"
2	Abraham Olano (ESP)	Mapei–GB–Latexco	+ 5' 18"
3	Johan Bruyneel (BEL)	ONCE	+ 6' 36"
4	Melcior Mauri (ESP)	ONCE	+ 6' 48"
5	Roberto Pistore (ITA)	Polti–Granarolo–Santini	+ 9' 02"
6	Michele Bartoli (ITA)	Mercatone Uno–Saeco	+ 9' 04"
7	Richard Virenque (FRA)	Festina–Lotus	+ 9' 09"
8	Daniel Clavero (ESP)	Artiach–Chiquilin	+ 10' 08"
9	Félix García Casas (ESP)	Artiach–Chiquilin	+ 10' 13"
10	David García (ESP)	Banesto	+ 10' 26"

== Stage 14 ==
16 September 1995 — Elche to Valencia, 207 km (129 mi)

Stage 14 result

Rank	Rider	Team	Time
1	Marcel Wüst (GER)	Castellblanch	5h 00' 31"
2	Erik Zabel (GER)	Team Telekom	s.t.
3	Nicola Minali (ITA)	Gewiss–Ballan	s.t.
4	Laurent Jalabert (FRA)	ONCE	s.t.
5	Abraham Olano (ESP)	Mapei–GB–Latexco	s.t.
6	Juan Carlos González (ESP)	Equipo Euskadi	s.t.
7	Asiat Saitov (RUS)	Artiach–Chiquilin	s.t.
8	Sven Teutenberg (GER)	Novell–Decca–Colnago	s.t.
9	Pascal Chanteur (FRA)	Chazal–König	s.t.
10	Adriano Baffi (ITA)	Mapei–GB–Latexco	s.t.

General classification after Stage 14

Rank	Rider	Team	Time
1	Laurent Jalabert (FRA)	ONCE	65h 31' 53"
2	Abraham Olano (ESP)	Mapei–GB–Latexco	+ 5' 20"
3	Johan Bruyneel (BEL)	ONCE	+ 6' 36"
4	Melcior Mauri (ESP)	ONCE	+ 6' 48"
5	Roberto Pistore (ITA)	Polti–Granarolo–Santini	+ 9' 04"
6	Michele Bartoli (ITA)	Mercatone Uno–Saeco	+ 9' 06"
7	Richard Virenque (FRA)	Festina–Lotus	+ 9' 11"
8	Daniel Clavero (ESP)	Artiach–Chiquilin	+ 10' 10"
9	Félix García Casas (ESP)	Artiach–Chiquilin	+ 10' 15"
10	David García (ESP)	Banesto	+ 10' 28"

== Stage 15 ==
17 September 1995 — Barcelona to Barcelona, 154 km (96 mi)

Stage 15 result

Rank	Rider	Team	Time
1	Laurent Jalabert (FRA)	ONCE	3h 59' 50"
2	Jesús Montoya (ESP)	Banesto	+ 5"
3	Michele Bartoli (ITA)	Mercatone Uno–Saeco	s.t.
4	Orlando Rodrigues (POR)	Artiach–Chiquilin	s.t.
5	Richard Virenque (FRA)	Festina–Lotus	+ 14"
6	Marcos-Antonio Serrano (ESP)	Kelme–Sureña	s.t.
7	Roberto Pistore (ITA)	Polti–Granarolo–Santini	+ 24"
8	David García (ESP)	Banesto	s.t.
9	Federico Echave (ESP)	Mapei–GB–Latexco	s.t.
10	Abraham Olano (ESP)	Mapei–GB–Latexco	s.t.

General classification after Stage 15

Rank	Rider	Team	Time
1	Laurent Jalabert (FRA)	ONCE	69h 31' 31"
2	Abraham Olano (ESP)	Mapei–GB–Latexco	+ 5' 56"
3	Johan Bruyneel (BEL)	ONCE	+ 7' 15"
4	Melcior Mauri (ESP)	ONCE	+ 7' 27"
5	Michele Bartoli (ITA)	Mercatone Uno–Saeco	+ 9' 19"
6	Richard Virenque (FRA)	Festina–Lotus	+ 9' 37"
7	Roberto Pistore (ITA)	Polti–Granarolo–Santini	+ 9' 39"
8	Daniel Clavero (ESP)	Artiach–Chiquilin	+ 10' 49"
9	Félix García Casas (ESP)	Artiach–Chiquilin	+ 10' 54"
10	Orlando Rodrigues (POR)	Artiach–Chiquilin	+ 11' 01"

== Rest day 2 ==
18 September 1995

== Stage 16 ==
19 September 1995 — Tàrrega to Pla de Beret, 197.3 km (122.6 mi)

Stage 16 result

Rank	Rider	Team	Time
1	Alex Zülle (SUI)	ONCE	5h 13' 24"
2	Laurent Jalabert (FRA)	ONCE	+ 3' 20"
3	Michele Bartoli (ITA)	Mercatone Uno–Saeco	s.t.
4	David García (ESP)	Banesto	s.t.
5	Richard Virenque (FRA)	Festina–Lotus	+ 3' 34"
6	Mauro Gianetti (SUI)	Polti–Granarolo–Santini	s.t.
7	Roberto Pistore (ITA)	Polti–Granarolo–Santini	s.t.
8	Melcior Mauri (ESP)	ONCE	s.t.
9	Abraham Olano (ESP)	Mapei–GB–Latexco	s.t.
10	Johan Bruyneel (BEL)	ONCE	s.t.

General classification after Stage 16

Rank	Rider	Team	Time
1	Laurent Jalabert (FRA)	ONCE	74h 48' 07"
2	Abraham Olano (ESP)	Mapei–GB–Latexco	+ 6' 18"
3	Johan Bruyneel (BEL)	ONCE	+ 7' 36"
4	Melcior Mauri (ESP)	ONCE	+ 7' 49"
5	Michele Bartoli (ITA)	Mercatone Uno–Saeco	+ 9' 23"
6	Richard Virenque (FRA)	Festina–Lotus	+ 9' 57"
7	Roberto Pistore (ITA)	Polti–Granarolo–Santini	+ 10' 01"
8	Daniel Clavero (ESP)	Artiach–Chiquilin	+ 11' 11"
9	David García (ESP)	Banesto	+ 11' 12"
10	Félix García Casas (ESP)	Artiach–Chiquilin	+ 11' 16"

== Stage 17 ==
20 September 1995 — Salardu to Luz Ardiden, 179.2 km (111.3 mi)

Stage 17 result

Rank	Rider	Team	Time
1	Laurent Jalabert (FRA)	ONCE	5h 34' 45"
2	Abraham Olano (ESP)	Mapei–GB–Latexco	+ 5"
3	Johan Bruyneel (BEL)	ONCE	+ 7"
4	Richard Virenque (FRA)	Festina–Lotus	+ 21"
5	David García (ESP)	Banesto	+ 26"
6	Roberto Pistore (ITA)	Polti–Granarolo–Santini	s.t.
7	Melcior Mauri (ESP)	ONCE	+ 52"
8	Daniel Clavero (ESP)	Artiach–Chiquilin	+ 1' 04"
9	Marcos-Antonio Serrano (ESP)	Kelme–Sureña	+ 2' 44"
10	Ermanno Brignoli (ITA)	Gewiss–Ballan	+ 2' 54"

General classification after Stage 17

Rank	Rider	Team	Time
1	Laurent Jalabert (FRA)	ONCE	80h 22' 39"
2	Abraham Olano (ESP)	Mapei–GB–Latexco	+ 6' 28"
3	Johan Bruyneel (BEL)	ONCE	+ 7' 50"
4	Melcior Mauri (ESP)	ONCE	+ 8' 51"
5	Richard Virenque (FRA)	Festina–Lotus	+ 10' 31"
6	Roberto Pistore (ITA)	Polti–Granarolo–Santini	+ 10' 40"
7	David García (ESP)	Banesto	+ 11' 51"
8	Daniel Clavero (ESP)	Artiach–Chiquilin	+ 12' 38"
9	Stefano Della Santa (ITA)	Mapei–GB–Latexco	+ 16' 24"
10	Marcos-Antonio Serrano (ESP)	Kelme–Sureña	+ 16' 26"

== Stage 18 ==
21 September 1995 — Luz-Saint-Sauveur to Sabiñánigo, 157.8 km (98.1 mi)

Stage 18 result

Rank	Rider	Team	Time
1	Asiat Saitov (RUS)	Artiach–Chiquilin	4h 05' 46"
2	Jesper Skibby (DEN)	TVM–Polis Direct	s.t.
3	José Antonio Espinosa (ESP)	Castellblanch	s.t.
4	Roberto Pistore (ITA)	Polti–Granarolo–Santini	s.t.
5	Viatcheslav Ekimov (RUS)	Novell–Decca–Colnago	s.t.
6	Richard Virenque (FRA)	Festina–Lotus	s.t.
7	Piotr Ugrumov (LAT)	Gewiss–Ballan	s.t.
8	Abraham Olano (ESP)	Mapei–GB–Latexco	s.t.
9	Laurent Jalabert (FRA)	ONCE	s.t.
10	José Rodríguez (ESP)	Kelme–Sureña	s.t.

General classification after Stage 18

Rank	Rider	Team	Time
1	Laurent Jalabert (FRA)	ONCE	84h 28' 25"
2	Abraham Olano (ESP)	Mapei–GB–Latexco	+ 6' 28"
3	Johan Bruyneel (BEL)	ONCE	+ 7' 50"
4	Melcior Mauri (ESP)	ONCE	+ 8' 51"
5	Richard Virenque (FRA)	Festina–Lotus	+ 10' 31"
6	Roberto Pistore (ITA)	Polti–Granarolo–Santini	+ 10' 40"
7	David García (ESP)	Banesto	+ 11' 51"
8	Daniel Clavero (ESP)	Artiach–Chiquilin	+ 12' 38"
9	Stefano Della Santa (ITA)	Mapei–GB–Latexco	+ 16' 24"
10	Marcos-Antonio Serrano (ESP)	Kelme–Sureña	+ 16' 26"

== Stage 19 ==
22 September 1995 — Sabiñánigo to Calatayud, 227.7 km (141.5 mi)

Stage 19 result

Rank	Rider	Team	Time
1	Adriano Baffi (ITA)	Mapei–GB–Latexco	5h 55' 26"
2	Asiat Saitov (RUS)	Artiach–Chiquilin	s.t.
3	Kaspars Ozers (LAT)	Motorola	s.t.
4	Steffen Wesemann (GER)	Team Telekom	s.t.
5	Martin van Steen (NED)	TVM–Polis Direct	s.t.
6	Pascal Chanteur (FRA)	Chazal–König	s.t.
7	Juan Carlos Domínguez (ESP)	Kelme–Sureña	s.t.
8	Cezary Zamana (POL)	Motorola	s.t.
9	Servais Knaven (NED)	TVM–Polis Direct	s.t.
10	Mirko Crepaldi (ITA)	Polti–Granarolo–Santini	s.t.

General classification after Stage 19

Rank	Rider	Team	Time
1	Laurent Jalabert (FRA)	ONCE	90h 23' 51"
2	Abraham Olano (ESP)	Mapei–GB–Latexco	+ 6' 28"
3	Johan Bruyneel (BEL)	ONCE	+ 7' 50"
4	Melcior Mauri (ESP)	ONCE	+ 8' 51"
5	Richard Virenque (FRA)	Festina–Lotus	+ 10' 31"
6	Roberto Pistore (ITA)	Polti–Granarolo–Santini	+ 10' 40"
7	David García (ESP)	Banesto	+ 11' 51"
8	Daniel Clavero (ESP)	Artiach–Chiquilin	+ 12' 38"
9	Stefano Della Santa (ITA)	Mapei–GB–Latexco	+ 16' 24"
10	Marcos-Antonio Serrano (ESP)	Kelme–Sureña	+ 16' 26"

== Stage 20 ==
23 September 1995 — Alcalá de Henares to Alcalá de Henares, 41.6 km (25.8 mi) (ITT)

Stage 20 result

Rank	Rider	Team	Time
1	Abraham Olano (ESP)	Mapei–GB–Latexco	49' 37"
2	Johan Bruyneel (BEL)	ONCE	+ 1' 04"
3	Melcior Mauri (ESP)	ONCE	+ 1' 19"
4	Piotr Ugrumov (LAT)	Gewiss–Ballan	+ 2' 00"
5	Laurent Jalabert (FRA)	ONCE	+ 2' 06"
6	Viatcheslav Ekimov (RUS)	Novell–Decca–Colnago	+ 2' 14"
7	Vladislav Bobrik (RUS)	Gewiss–Ballan	+ 2' 21"
8	Ángel Casero (ESP)	Banesto	+ 2' 26"
9	Ermanno Brignoli (ITA)	Gewiss–Ballan	+ 2' 29"
10	Michael Andersson (SWE)	Sicasal–Acral	+ 2' 30"

General classification after Stage 20

Rank	Rider	Team	Time
1	Laurent Jalabert (FRA)	ONCE	91h 15' 34"
2	Abraham Olano (ESP)	Mapei–GB–Latexco	+ 4' 22"
3	Johan Bruyneel (BEL)	ONCE	+ 6' 48"
4	Melcior Mauri (ESP)	ONCE	+ 8' 04"
5	Richard Virenque (FRA)	Festina–Lotus	+ 11' 38"
6	Roberto Pistore (ITA)	Polti–Granarolo–Santini	+ 11' 54"
7	David García (ESP)	Banesto	+ 13' 50"
8	Daniel Clavero (ESP)	Artiach–Chiquilin	+ 15' 03"
9	Michele Bartoli (ITA)	Mercatone Uno–Saeco	+ 19' 14"
10	Stefano Della Santa (ITA)	Mapei–GB–Latexco	+ 19' 42"

== Stage 21 ==
24 September 1995 — Alcalá de Henares to Madrid, 171.2 km (106.4 mi)

Stage 21 result

Rank	Rider	Team	Time
1	Marcel Wüst (GER)	Castellblanch	4h 14' 59"
2	Jesper Skibby (DEN)	TVM–Polis Direct	s.t.
3	Steffen Wesemann (GER)	Team Telekom	s.t.
4	Asiat Saitov (RUS)	Artiach–Chiquilin	s.t.
5	Adriano Baffi (ITA)	Mapei–GB–Latexco	s.t.
6	Mirko Crepaldi (ITA)	Polti–Granarolo–Santini	s.t.
7	Sven Teutenberg (GER)	Novell–Decca–Colnago	s.t.
8	Richard Virenque (FRA)	Festina–Lotus	s.t.
9	Paolo Fornaciari (ITA)	Mercatone Uno–Saeco	s.t.
10	Cezary Zamana (POL)	Motorola	s.t.

General classification after Stage 21

Rank	Rider	Team	Time
1	Laurent Jalabert (FRA)	ONCE	95h 30' 33"
2	Abraham Olano (ESP)	Mapei–GB–Latexco	+ 4' 22"
3	Johan Bruyneel (BEL)	ONCE	+ 6' 48"
4	Melcior Mauri (ESP)	ONCE	+ 8' 04"
5	Richard Virenque (FRA)	Festina–Lotus	+ 11' 38"
6	Roberto Pistore (ITA)	Polti–Granarolo–Santini	+ 11' 54"
7	David García (ESP)	Banesto	+ 13' 50"
8	Daniel Clavero (ESP)	Artiach–Chiquilin	+ 15' 03"
9	Michele Bartoli (ITA)	Mercatone Uno–Saeco	+ 19' 14"
10	Stefano Della Santa (ITA)	Mapei–GB–Latexco	+ 19' 42"
