= 1995 Vuelta a España, Prologue to Stage 10 =

Cycling race stages

The 1995 Vuelta a España was the 50th edition of the Vuelta a España, one of cycling's Grand Tours. The Vuelta began in Zaragoza, with a prologue individual time trial on 2 September, and Stage 10 occurred on 12 September with a flat stage to Seville. The race finished in Madrid on 24 September.

== Prologue ==
2 September 1995 — Zaragoza to Zaragoza, 7 km (4.3 mi) (ITT)

Prologue result and general classification after Prologue

Rank	Rider	Team	Time
1	Abraham Olano (ESP)	Mapei–GB–Latexco	7' 51"
2	Alex Zülle (SUI)	ONCE	+ 4"
3	Adriano Baffi (ITA)	Mapei–GB–Latexco	+ 12"
4	Johan Bruyneel (BEL)	ONCE	+ 13"
5	Laurent Jalabert (FRA)	ONCE	s.t.
6	Viatcheslav Ekimov (RUS)	Novell–Decca–Colnago	+ 14"
7	Bjarne Riis (DEN)	Gewiss–Ballan	+ 15"
8	Melcior Mauri (ESP)	ONCE	+ 21"
9	Ángel Casero (ESP)	Banesto	+ 22"
10	Michael Andersson (SUI)	Sicasal–Acral	s.t.

== Stage 1 ==
3 September 1995 — Zaragoza to Logroño, 186.6 km (115.9 mi)

Stage 1 result

Rank	Rider	Team	Time
1	Nicola Minali (ITA)	Gewiss–Ballan	5h 42' 45"
2	Jeroen Blijlevens (NED)	TVM–Polis Direct	s.t.
3	Laurent Jalabert (FRA)	ONCE	s.t.
4	Erik Zabel (GER)	Team Telekom	s.t.
5	Simone Biasci (ITA)	Mercatone Uno–Saeco	s.t.
6	Jean-Claude Colotti (FRA)	GAN	s.t.
7	Marcel Wüst (GER)	Castellblanch	s.t.
8	Eloy Santamarta (ESP)	Santa Clara-Cadena Master	s.t.
9	Eros Poli (ITA)	Mercatone Uno–Saeco	s.t.
10	Stefano Zanini (ITA)	Gewiss–Ballan	s.t.

General classification after Stage 1

Rank	Rider	Team	Time
1	Abraham Olano (ESP)	Mapei–GB–Latexco	5h 50' 36"
2	Alex Zülle (SUI)	ONCE	+ 4"
3	Laurent Jalabert (FRA)	ONCE	+ 9"
4	Adriano Baffi (ITA)	Mapei–GB–Latexco	+ 12"
5	Johan Bruyneel (BEL)	ONCE	+ 13"
6	Viatcheslav Ekimov (RUS)	Novell–Decca–Colnago	+ 14"
7	Bjarne Riis (DEN)	Gewiss–Ballan	+ 15"
8	Melcior Mauri (ESP)	ONCE	+ 21"
9	Ángel Casero (ESP)	Banesto	+ 22"
10	Michael Andersson (SUI)	Sicasal–Acral	s.t.

== Stage 2 ==
4 September 1995 — San Asensio to Santander, 223.5 km (138.9 mi)

Stage 2 result

Rank	Rider	Team	Time
1	Gianluca Pianegonda (ITA)	Polti–Granarolo–Santini	6h 12' 34"
2	Bert Dietz (GER)	Team Telekom	+ 13"
3	Orlando Rodrigues (POR)	Artiach–Chiquilin	s.t.
4	Melcior Mauri (ESP)	ONCE	s.t.
5	David García (ESP)	Banesto	s.t.
6	Pascal Chanteur (FRA)	Chazal–König	s.t.
7	Roberto Torres (ESP)	Festina–Lotus	s.t.
8	Álvaro Mejía (COL)	Motorola	s.t.
9	Piotr Ugrumov (LAT)	Gewiss–Ballan	s.t.
10	Francisco Benítez (ESP)	Kelme–Sureña	s.t.

General classification after Stage 2

Rank	Rider	Team	Time
1	Gianluca Pianegonda (ITA)	Polti–Granarolo–Santini	12h 03' 23"
2	Abraham Olano (ESP)	Mapei–GB–Latexco	+ 18"
3	Orlando Rodrigues (POR)	Artiach–Chiquilin	+ 21"
4	Melcior Mauri (ESP)	ONCE	s.t.
5	Alex Zülle (SUI)	ONCE	+ 23"
6	Laurent Jalabert (FRA)	ONCE	+ 24"
7	Piotr Ugrumov (LAT)	Gewiss–Ballan	+ 25"
8	Álvaro Mejía (COL)	Motorola	+ 29"
9	Adriano Baffi (ITA)	Mapei–GB–Latexco	+ 31"
10	Johan Bruyneel (BEL)	ONCE	+ 32"

== Stage 3 ==
5 September 1995 — Santander to Alto del Naranco, 206 km (128 mi)

Stage 3 result

Rank	Rider	Team	Time
1	Laurent Jalabert (FRA)	ONCE	5h 02' 39"
2	Abraham Olano (ESP)	Mapei–GB–Latexco	+ 10"
3	Alex Zülle (SUI)	ONCE	s.t.
4	Íñigo Cuesta (ESP)	Equipo Euskadi	+ 24"
5	Michele Bartoli (ITA)	Mercatone Uno–Saeco	s.t.
6	Melcior Mauri (ESP)	ONCE	s.t.
7	Stefano Della Santa (ITA)	Mapei–GB–Latexco	s.t.
8	Johan Bruyneel (BEL)	ONCE	s.t.
9	Félix García Casas (ESP)	Artiach–Chiquilin	+ 29"
10	Gianluca Pianegonda (ITA)	Polti–Granarolo–Santini	s.t.

General classification after Stage 3

Rank	Rider	Team	Time
1	Laurent Jalabert (FRA)	ONCE	17h 06' 14"
2	Abraham Olano (ESP)	Mapei–GB–Latexco	+ 8"
3	Alex Zülle (SUI)	ONCE	+ 17"
4	Gianluca Pianegonda (ITA)	Polti–Granarolo–Santini	s.t.
5	Melcior Mauri (ESP)	ONCE	+ 33"
6	Orlando Rodrigues (POR)	Artiach–Chiquilin	+ 44"
7	Johan Bruyneel (BEL)	ONCE	s.t.
8	Félix García Casas (ESP)	Artiach–Chiquilin	+ 50"
9	Michele Bartoli (ITA)	Mercatone Uno–Saeco	+ 54"
10	Piotr Ugrumov (LAT)	Gewiss–Ballan	+ 57"

== Stage 4 ==
6 September 1995 — Tapia de Casariego to A Coruña, 82.6 km (51.3 mi)

Stage 4 result

Rank	Rider	Team	Time
1	Marcel Wüst (GER)	Castellblanch	2h 15' 52"
2	Stefano Zanini (ITA)	Gewiss–Ballan	s.t.
3	Laurent Jalabert (FRA)	ONCE	s.t.
4	Asiat Saitov (RUS)	Artiach–Chiquilin	s.t.
5	Adriano Baffi (ITA)	Mapei–GB–Latexco	s.t.
6	Gianluca Pianegonda (ITA)	Polti–Granarolo–Santini	s.t.
7	Jesper Skibby (DEN)	TVM–Polis Direct	s.t.
8	Rob Mulders (NED)	Novell–Decca–Colnago	s.t.
9	Jean-Claude Colotti (FRA)	GAN	s.t.
10	José Luis Santamaría (ESP)	Artiach–Chiquilin	s.t.

General classification after Stage 4

Rank	Rider	Team	Time
1	Laurent Jalabert (FRA)	ONCE	19h 22' 02"
2	Abraham Olano (ESP)	Mapei–GB–Latexco	+ 12"
3	Alex Zülle (SUI)	ONCE	+ 21"
4	Gianluca Pianegonda (ITA)	Polti–Granarolo–Santini	s.t.
5	Melcior Mauri (ESP)	ONCE	+ 37"
6	Orlando Rodrigues (POR)	Artiach–Chiquilin	+ 48"
7	Johan Bruyneel (BEL)	ONCE	s.t.
8	Félix García Casas (ESP)	Artiach–Chiquilin	+ 54"
9	Michele Bartoli (ITA)	Mercatone Uno–Saeco	+ 58"
10	Piotr Ugrumov (LAT)	Gewiss–Ballan	+ 1' 01"

== Stage 5 ==
7 September 1995 — A Coruña to Ourense, 179.8 km (111.7 mi)

Stage 5 result

Rank	Rider	Team	Time
1	Laurent Jalabert (FRA)	ONCE	4h 41' 04"
2	Nicola Minali (ITA)	Gewiss–Ballan	s.t.
3	Adriano Baffi (ITA)	Mapei–GB–Latexco	s.t.
4	Michele Bartoli (ITA)	Mercatone Uno–Saeco	s.t.
5	Marcel Wüst (GER)	Castellblanch	s.t.
6	Mirko Crepaldi (ITA)	Polti–Granarolo–Santini	+ 2"
7	Abraham Olano (ESP)	Mapei–GB–Latexco	s.t.
8	Gianluca Pianegonda (ITA)	Polti–Granarolo–Santini	s.t.
9	Cezary Zamana (POL)	Motorola	s.t.
10	Jean-Claude Colotti (FRA)	GAN	s.t.

General classification after Stage 5

Rank	Rider	Team	Time
1	Laurent Jalabert (FRA)	ONCE	24h 02' 53"
2	Abraham Olano (ESP)	Mapei–GB–Latexco	+ 27"
3	Alex Zülle (SUI)	ONCE	+ 36"
4	Gianluca Pianegonda (ITA)	Polti–Granarolo–Santini	s.t.
5	Melcior Mauri (ESP)	ONCE	+ 49"
6	Orlando Rodrigues (POR)	Artiach–Chiquilin	+ 1' 03"
7	Johan Bruyneel (BEL)	ONCE	s.t.
8	Félix García Casas (ESP)	Artiach–Chiquilin	+ 1' 09"
9	Michele Bartoli (ITA)	Mercatone Uno–Saeco	+ 1' 11"
10	Piotr Ugrumov (LAT)	Gewiss–Ballan	+ 1' 16"

== Stage 6 ==
8 September 1995 — Ourense to Zamora, 264 km (164 mi)

Stage 6 result

Rank	Rider	Team	Time
1	Nicola Minali (ITA)	Gewiss–Ballan	7h 00' 27"
2	Marcel Wüst (GER)	Castellblanch	s.t.
3	Adriano Baffi (ITA)	Mapei–GB–Latexco	s.t.
4	Jeroen Blijlevens (NED)	TVM–Polis Direct	s.t.
5	Djamolidine Abdoujaparov (UZB)	Novell–Decca–Colnago	s.t.
6	Gianluca Pianegonda (ITA)	Polti–Granarolo–Santini	s.t.
7	Laurent Jalabert (FRA)	ONCE	s.t.
8	Michele Bartoli (ITA)	Mercatone Uno–Saeco	s.t.
9	Asiat Saitov (RUS)	Artiach–Chiquilin	s.t.
10	Simone Biasci (ITA)	Mercatone Uno–Saeco	s.t.

General classification after Stage 6

Rank	Rider	Team	Time
1	Laurent Jalabert (FRA)	ONCE	31h 03' 18"
2	Abraham Olano (ESP)	Mapei–GB–Latexco	+ 29"
3	Gianluca Pianegonda (ITA)	Polti–Granarolo–Santini	+ 38"
4	Melcior Mauri (ESP)	ONCE	+ 51"
5	Orlando Rodrigues (POR)	Artiach–Chiquilin	+ 1' 05"
6	Johan Bruyneel (BEL)	ONCE	s.t.
7	Michele Bartoli (ITA)	Mercatone Uno–Saeco	+ 1' 13"
8	Bjarne Riis (DEN)	Gewiss–Ballan	+ 1' 18"
9	Richard Virenque (FRA)	Festina–Lotus	+ 1' 31"
10	Peter Meinert (DEN)	TVM–Polis Direct	+ 1' 46"

== Stage 7 ==
9 September 1995 — Salamanca to Salamanca, 41 km (25 mi)

Stage 7 result

Rank	Rider	Team	Time
1	Abraham Olano (ESP)	Mapei–GB–Latexco	47' 37"
2	Laurent Jalabert (FRA)	ONCE	+ 23"
3	Alex Zülle (SUI)	ONCE	+ 43"
4	Johan Bruyneel (BEL)	ONCE	+ 48"
5	Michele Bartoli (ITA)	Mercatone Uno–Saeco	+ 55"
6	Bjarne Riis (DEN)	Gewiss–Ballan	+ 58"
7	Melcior Mauri (ESP)	ONCE	+ 1' 06"
8	Michael Andersson (SUI)	Sicasal–Acral	s.t.
9	Ángel Casero (ESP)	Banesto	+ 1' 08"
10	Viatcheslav Ekimov (RUS)	Novell–Decca–Colnago	+ 1' 27"

General classification after Stage 7

Rank	Rider	Team	Time
1	Laurent Jalabert (FRA)	ONCE	31h 51' 18"
2	Abraham Olano (ESP)	Mapei–GB–Latexco	+ 6"
3	Johan Bruyneel (BEL)	ONCE	+ 1' 30"
4	Melcior Mauri (ESP)	ONCE	+ 1' 34"
5	Michele Bartoli (ITA)	Mercatone Uno–Saeco	+ 1' 45"
6	Bjarne Riis (DEN)	Gewiss–Ballan	+ 1' 53"
7	Gianluca Pianegonda (ITA)	Polti–Granarolo–Santini	+ 2' 17"
8	Alex Zülle (SUI)	ONCE	+ 2' 39"
9	Ángel Casero (ESP)	Banesto	+ 3' 21"
10	Orlando Rodrigues (POR)	Artiach–Chiquilin	+ 3' 25"

== Stage 8 ==
10 September 1995 — Salamanca to Ávila, 219.8 km (136.6 mi)

Stage 8 result

Rank	Rider	Team	Time
1	Laurent Jalabert (FRA)	ONCE	6h 05' 01"
2	Roberto Pistore (ITA)	Polti–Granarolo–Santini	+ 3' 16"
3	Johan Bruyneel (BEL)	ONCE	+ 4' 32"
4	Richard Virenque (FRA)	Festina–Lotus	+ 4' 40"
5	Axel Merckx (BEL)	Motorola	s.t.
6	Orlando Rodrigues (POR)	Artiach–Chiquilin	s.t.
7	Abraham Olano (ESP)	Mapei–GB–Latexco	s.t.
8	Alex Zülle (SUI)	ONCE	s.t.
9	Melcior Mauri (ESP)	ONCE	s.t.
10	Marcos-Antonio Serrano (ESP)	Kelme–Sureña	s.t.

General classification after Stage 8

Rank	Rider	Team	Time
1	Laurent Jalabert (FRA)	ONCE	37h 56' 02"
2	Abraham Olano (ESP)	Mapei–GB–Latexco	+ 5' 03"
3	Johan Bruyneel (BEL)	ONCE	+ 6' 15"
4	Melcior Mauri (ESP)	ONCE	+ 6' 30"
5	Bjarne Riis (DEN)	Gewiss–Ballan	+ 6' 50"
6	Alex Zülle (SUI)	ONCE	+ 7' 36"
7	Orlando Rodrigues (POR)	Artiach–Chiquilin	+ 8' 22"
8	Richard Virenque (FRA)	Festina–Lotus	+ 8' 37"
9	Roberto Pistore (ITA)	Polti–Granarolo–Santini	+ 8' 40"
10	Michele Bartoli (ITA)	Mercatone Uno–Saeco	+ 8' 42"

== Stage 9 ==
11 September 1995 — Ávila to Palazuelos de Eresma, 122.5 km (76.1 mi)

Stage 9 result

Rank	Rider	Team	Time
1	Jesper Skibby (DEN)	TVM–Polis Direct	2h 51' 37"
2	Laurent Jalabert (FRA)	ONCE	+ 1' 10"
3	Melcior Mauri (ESP)	ONCE	s.t.
4	Michele Bartoli (ITA)	Mercatone Uno–Saeco	s.t.
5	David García (ESP)	Banesto	s.t.
6	Johan Bruyneel (BEL)	ONCE	s.t.
7	Abraham Olano (ESP)	Mapei–GB–Latexco	s.t.
8	Richard Virenque (FRA)	Festina–Lotus	s.t.
9	Bjarne Riis (DEN)	Gewiss–Ballan	s.t.
10	Roberto Pistore (ITA)	Polti–Granarolo–Santini	s.t.

General classification after Stage 9

Rank	Rider	Team	Time
1	Laurent Jalabert (FRA)	ONCE	40h 48' 41"
2	Abraham Olano (ESP)	Mapei–GB–Latexco	+ 5' 11"
3	Johan Bruyneel (BEL)	ONCE	+ 6' 23"
4	Melcior Mauri (ESP)	ONCE	+ 6' 34"
5	Bjarne Riis (DEN)	Gewiss–Ballan	+ 6' 58"
6	Alex Zülle (SUI)	ONCE	+ 7' 44"
7	Orlando Rodrigues (POR)	Artiach–Chiquilin	+ 8' 30"
8	Richard Virenque (FRA)	Festina–Lotus	+ 8' 45"
9	Roberto Pistore (ITA)	Polti–Granarolo–Santini	+ 8' 48"
10	Michele Bartoli (ITA)	Mercatone Uno–Saeco	+ 8' 50"

== Stage 10 ==
12 September 1995 — Córdoba to Seville, 208.5 km (129.6 mi)

Stage 10 result

Rank	Rider	Team	Time
1	Jeroen Blijlevens (NED)	TVM–Polis Direct	4h 21' 26"
2	Nicola Minali (ITA)	Gewiss–Ballan	s.t.
3	Sven Teutenberg (GER)	Novell–Decca–Colnago	s.t.
4	Marcel Wüst (GER)	Castellblanch	s.t.
5	Erik Zabel (GER)	Team Telekom	s.t.
6	Mirko Crepaldi (ITA)	Polti–Granarolo–Santini	s.t.
7	Juan Carlos González (ESP)	Equipo Euskadi	s.t.
8	Michele Bartoli (ITA)	Mercatone Uno–Saeco	s.t.
9	Marco Pantani (ITA)	Carrera Jeans–Tassoni	s.t.
10	Adriano Baffi (ITA)	Mapei–GB–Latexco	s.t.

General classification after Stage 10

Rank	Rider	Team	Time
1	Laurent Jalabert (FRA)	ONCE	45h 10' 06"
2	Abraham Olano (ESP)	Mapei–GB–Latexco	+ 5' 12"
3	Johan Bruyneel (BEL)	ONCE	+ 6' 24"
4	Melcior Mauri (ESP)	ONCE	+ 6' 35"
5	Alex Zülle (SUI)	ONCE	+ 7' 45"
6	Orlando Rodrigues (POR)	Artiach–Chiquilin	+ 8' 31"
7	Richard Virenque (FRA)	Festina–Lotus	+ 8' 46"
8	Roberto Pistore (ITA)	Polti–Granarolo–Santini	+ 8' 49"
9	Michele Bartoli (ITA)	Mercatone Uno–Saeco	+ 8' 51"
10	Peter Meinert (DEN)	TVM–Polis Direct	+ 9' 53"
