= List of teams and cyclists in the 1998 Tour de France =

List of cyclists

The 1998 Tour de France was the 85th edition of Tour de France, one of cycling's Grand Tours. This Tour featured 189 riders on 21 cycling teams, starting in Dublin, Ireland on 11 July and finishing on the Champs-Élysées in Paris on 2 August.

== Teams ==
Qualified teams

- Team Telekom
- Festina–Lotus
- Mercatone Uno–Bianchi
- Mapei–Bricobi
- ONCE
- Rabobank
- Casino–Ag2r
- Banesto
- GAN
- Lotto–Mobistar
- TVM–Farm Frites
- Saeco–Cannondale
- Française des Jeux
- Team Polti
- Kelme–Costa Blanca
- U.S. Postal Service

Invited teams

- Cofidis
- Asics–CGA
- Vitalicio Seguros
- Riso Scotti–MG Maglificio
- BigMat–Auber 93

== Cyclists ==
Legend
No.	Starting number worn by the rider during the Tour
Pos.	Position in the general classification
DNF	Denotes a rider who did not finish

=== By starting number ===
No.	Name	Nationality	Team	Pos.	Ref
1	Jan Ullrich	Germany	Team Telekom	2	
2	Rolf Aldag	Germany	Team Telekom	43	
3	Udo Bölts	Germany	Team Telekom	21	
4	Francesco Frattini	Italy	Team Telekom	93	
5	Christian Henn	Germany	Team Telekom	80	
6	Jens Heppner	Germany	Team Telekom	56	
7	Bjarne Riis	Denmark	Team Telekom	11	
8	Georg Totschnig	Austria	Team Telekom	27	
9	Erik Zabel	Germany	Team Telekom	62	
11	Richard Virenque	France	Festina–Lotus	DNF	
12	Laurent Brochard	France	Festina–Lotus	DNF	
13	Laurent Dufaux	Switzerland	Festina–Lotus	DNF	
14	Pascal Hervé	France	Festina–Lotus	DNF	
15	Armin Meier	Switzerland	Festina–Lotus	DNF	
16	Christophe Moreau	France	Festina–Lotus	DNF	
17	Didier Rous	France	Festina–Lotus	DNF	
18	Neil Stephens	Australia	Festina–Lotus	DNF	
19	Alex Zülle	Switzerland	Festina–Lotus	DNF	
21	Marco Pantani	Italy	Mercatone Uno–Bianchi	1	
22	Sergio Barbero	Italy	Mercatone Uno–Bianchi	DNF	
23	Simone Borgheresi	Italy	Mercatone Uno–Bianchi	52	
24	Roberto Conti	Italy	Mercatone Uno–Bianchi	60	
25	Fabiano Fontanelli	Italy	Mercatone Uno–Bianchi	72	
26	Riccardo Forconi	Italy	Mercatone Uno–Bianchi	46	
27	Dimitri Konyshev	Russia	Mercatone Uno–Bianchi	DNF	
28	Massimo Podenzana	Italy	Mercatone Uno–Bianchi	37	
29	Mario Traversoni	Italy	Mercatone Uno–Bianchi	95	
31	Franco Ballerini	Italy	Mapei–Bricobi	DNF	
32	Giuseppe Di Grande	Italy	Mapei–Bricobi	9	
33	Bart Leysen	Belgium	Mapei–Bricobi	92	
34	Daniele Nardello	Italy	Mapei–Bricobi	8	
35	Wilfried Peeters	Belgium	Mapei–Bricobi	68	
36	Tom Steels	Belgium	Mapei–Bricobi	85	
37	Ján Svorada	Czech Republic	Mapei–Bricobi	DNF	
38	Andrea Tafi	Italy	Mapei–Bricobi	42	
39	Stefano Zanini	Italy	Mapei–Bricobi	73	
41	Laurent Jalabert	France	ONCE	DNF	
42	Johan Bruyneel	Belgium	ONCE	DNF	
43	Rafael Díaz Justo	Spain	ONCE	DNF	
44	Herminio Díaz Zabala	Spain	ONCE	DNF	
45	Marcelino García	Spain	ONCE	DNF	
46	Javier Mauleón	Spain	ONCE	DNF	
47	Melcior Mauri	Spain	ONCE	DNF	
48	Luis Pérez Rodríguez	Spain	ONCE	DNF	
49	Roberto Sierra	Spain	ONCE	DNF	
51	Michael Boogerd	Netherlands	Rabobank	5	
52	Erik Dekker	Netherlands	Rabobank	DNF	
53	Maarten den Bakker	Netherlands	Rabobank	33	
54	Patrick Jonker	Netherlands	Rabobank	34	
55	Robbie McEwen	Australia	Rabobank	89	
56	Koos Moerenhout	Netherlands	Rabobank	44	
57	Léon van Bon	Netherlands	Rabobank	63	
58	Aart Vierhouten	Netherlands	Rabobank	88	
59	Beat Zberg	Switzerland	Rabobank	40	
61	Bo Hamburger	Denmark	Casino–Ag2r	15	
62	Christophe Agnolutto	France	Casino–Ag2r	31	
63	Stéphane Barthe	France	Casino–Ag2r	DNF	
64	Pascal Chanteur	France	Casino–Ag2r	35	
65	Jacky Durand	France	Casino–Ag2r	65	
66	Alberto Elli	Italy	Casino–Ag2r	29	
67	Jaan Kirsipuu	Estonia	Casino–Ag2r	DNF	
68	Rodolfo Massi	Italy	Casino–Ag2r	DNF	
69	Benoît Salmon	France	Casino–Ag2r	28	
71	Abraham Olano	Spain	Banesto	DNF	
72	Marino Alonso	Spain	Banesto	DNF	
73	José Luis Arrieta	Spain	Banesto	DNF	
74	Manuel Beltrán	Spain	Banesto	DNF	
75	Vicente Garcia-Acosta	Spain	Banesto	DNF	
76	José María Jiménez	Spain	Banesto	DNF	
77	Miguel Ángel Peña	Spain	Banesto	DNF	
78	Orlando Rodrigues	Portugal	Banesto	DNF	
79	César Solaun	Spain	Banesto	DNF	
81	Chris Boardman	Great Britain	GAN	DNF	
82	Magnus Bäckstedt	Sweden	GAN	70	
83	Frédéric Moncassin	France	GAN	DNF	
84	Stuart O'Grady	Australia	GAN	54	
85	Eros Poli	Italy	GAN	86	
86	Eddy Seigneur	France	GAN	DNF	
87	François Simon	France	GAN	57	
88	Cédric Vasseur	France	GAN	24	
89	Jens Voigt	Germany	GAN	83	
91	Laurent Madouas	France	Lotto–Mobistar	22	
92	Peter Farazijn	Belgium	Lotto–Mobistar	19	
93	Joona Laukka	Finland	Lotto–Mobistar	DNF	
94	Andrei Tchmil	Ukraine	Lotto–Mobistar	DNF	
95	Andrei Teteriuk	Kazakhstan	Lotto–Mobistar	20	
96	Kurt Van De Wouwer	Belgium	Lotto–Mobistar	16	
97	Paul Van Hyfte	Belgium	Lotto–Mobistar	64	
98	Rik Verbrugghe	Belgium	Lotto–Mobistar	69	
99	Geert Verheyen	Belgium	Lotto–Mobistar	23	
101	Laurent Roux	France	TVM–Farm Frites	DNF	
102	Jeroen Blijlevens	Netherlands	TVM–Farm Frites	DNF	
103	Steven de Jongh	Netherlands	TVM–Farm Frites	DNF	
104	Sergei Ivanov	Russia	TVM–Farm Frites	DNF	
105	Servais Knaven	Netherlands	TVM–Farm Frites	DNF	
106	Lars Michaelsen	Denmark	TVM–Farm Frites	DNF	
107	Serguei Outschakov	Ukraine	TVM–Farm Frites	DNF	
108	Peter Van Petegem	Belgium	TVM–Farm Frites	DNF	
109	Bart Voskamp	Netherlands	TVM–Farm Frites	DNF	
111	Mario Cipollini	Italy	Saeco–Cannondale	DNF	
112	Giuseppe Calcaterra	Italy	Saeco–Cannondale	DNF	
113	Massimo Donati	Italy	Saeco–Cannondale	50	
114	Gian Matteo Fagnini	Italy	Saeco–Cannondale	DNF	
115	Paolo Fornaciari	Italy	Saeco–Cannondale	90	
116	Eddy Mazzoleni	Italy	Saeco–Cannondale	71	
117	Massimiliano Mori	Italy	Saeco–Cannondale	91	
118	Leonardo Piepoli	Italy	Saeco–Cannondale	14	
119	Mario Scirea	Italy	Saeco–Cannondale	DNF	
121	Evgeni Berzin	Russia	Française des Jeux	25	
122	Franck Bouyer	France	Française des Jeux	94	
123	Frédéric Guesdon	France	Française des Jeux	67	
124	Stéphane Heulot	France	Française des Jeux	13	
125	Xavier Jan	France	Française des Jeux	77	
126	Emmanuel Magnien	France	Française des Jeux	DNF	
127	Christophe Mengin	France	Française des Jeux	66	
128	Damien Nazon	France	Française des Jeux	96	
129	Maximilian Sciandri	Great Britain	Française des Jeux	DNF	
131	Francesco Casagrande	Italy	Cofidis	DNF	
132	Laurent Desbiens	France	Cofidis	61	
133	Philippe Gaumont	France	Cofidis	DNF	
134	Nicolas Jalabert	France	Cofidis	49	
135	Bobby Julich	United States	Cofidis	3	
136	Massimiliano Lelli	Italy	Cofidis	36	
137	Kevin Livingston	United States	Cofidis	17	
138	Roland Meier	Switzerland	Cofidis	7	
139	Christophe Rinero	France	Cofidis	4	
141	Luc Leblanc	France	Team Polti	DNF	
142	Rossano Brasi	Italy	Team Polti	82	
143	Mirko Crepaldi	Italy	Team Polti	75	
144	Fabrizio Guidi	Italy	Team Polti	DNF	
145	Leonardo Guidi	Italy	Team Polti	DNF	
146	Jörg Jaksche	Germany	Team Polti	18	
147	Silvio Martinello	Italy	Team Polti	DNF	
148	Axel Merckx	Belgium	Team Polti	10	
149	Fabio Sacchi	Italy	Team Polti	47	
151	Carlo Marino Bianchi	Italy	Asics–CGA	DNF	
152	Alessio Bongioni	Italy	Asics–CGA	DNF	
153	Diego Ferrari	Italy	Asics–CGA	76	
154	Oscar Pozzi	Italy	Asics–CGA	32	
155	Fabio Roscioli	Italy	Asics–CGA	79	
156	Samuele Schiavina	Italy	Asics–CGA	DNF	
157	Aleksandre Shefer	Kazakhstan	Asics–CGA	DNF	
158	Filippo Simeoni	Italy	Asics–CGA	55	
159	Alain Turicchia	Italy	Asics–CGA	74	
161	Santiago Blanco	Spain	Vitalicio Seguros	DNF	
162	Francisco Benítez	Spain	Vitalicio Seguros	DNF	
163	Hernán Buenahora	Colombia	Vitalicio Seguros	DNF	
164	Ángel Casero	Spain	Vitalicio Seguros	DNF	
165	Andrea Ferrigato	Italy	Vitalicio Seguros	DNF	
166	David García	Spain	Vitalicio Seguros	DNF	
167	Francisco Tomás García	Spain	Vitalicio Seguros	DNF	
168	Prudencio Induráin	Spain	Vitalicio Seguros	DNF	
169	Oliverio Rincón	Colombia	Vitalicio Seguros	DNF	
171	Fernando Escartín	Spain	Kelme–Costa Blanca	DNF	
172	Francisco Cabello	Spain	Kelme–Costa Blanca	DNF	
173	Carlos Contreras	Colombia	Kelme–Costa Blanca	DNF	
174	Juan José de los Ángeles	Spain	Kelme–Costa Blanca	DNF	
175	José Javier Gómez	Spain	Kelme–Costa Blanca	DNF	
176	Santos González	Spain	Kelme–Costa Blanca	DNF	
177	José Rodríguez	Spain	Kelme–Costa Blanca	DNF	
178	Marcos Serrano	Spain	Kelme–Costa Blanca	DNF	
179	José Ángel Vidal	Spain	Kelme–Costa Blanca	DNF	
181	Jean-Cyril Robin	France	U.S. Postal Service	6	
182	Frankie Andreu	United States	U.S. Postal Service	58	
183	Dariusz Baranowski	Poland	U.S. Postal Service	12	
184	Pascal Deramé	France	U.S. Postal Service	84	
185	Viatcheslav Ekimov	Russia	U.S. Postal Service	38	
186	Tyler Hamilton	United States	U.S. Postal Service	51	
187	George Hincapie	United States	U.S. Postal Service	53	
188	Marty Jemison	United States	U.S. Postal Service	48	
189	Peter Meinert	Denmark	U.S. Postal Service	45	
191	Fabio Baldato	Italy	Riso Scotti–MG Maglificio	DNF	
192	Vladislav Bobrik	Russia	Riso Scotti–MG Maglificio	DNF	
193	Ermanno Brignoli	Italy	Riso Scotti–MG Maglificio	DNF	
194	Roberto Caruso	Italy	Riso Scotti–MG Maglificio	DNF	
195	Stefano Casagranda	Italy	Riso Scotti–MG Maglificio	DNF	
196	Federico de Beni	Italy	Riso Scotti–MG Maglificio	DNF	
197	Nicola Minali	Italy	Riso Scotti–MG Maglificio	DNF	
198	Roberto Pistore	Italy	Riso Scotti–MG Maglificio	DNF	
199	Alessandro Spezialetti	Italy	Riso Scotti–MG Maglificio	DNF	
201	Pascal Lino	France	BigMat–Auber 93	78	
202	Ludovic Auger	France	BigMat–Auber 93	DNF	
203	Philippe Bordenave	France	BigMat–Auber 93	30	
204	Thierry Bourguignon	France	BigMat–Auber 93	26	
205	Viatcheslav Djavanian	Russia	BigMat–Auber 93	81	
206	Thierry Gouvenou	France	BigMat–Auber 93	59	
207	Lylian Lebreton	France	BigMat–Auber 93	41	
208	Denis Leproux	France	BigMat–Auber 93	39	
209	Alexei Sivakov	Russia	BigMat–Auber 93	87	

=== By team ===
Team Telekom TEL
No.	Rider	Pos.
1	Jan Ullrich (GER)	2
2	Rolf Aldag (GER)	43
3	Udo Bölts (GER)	21
4	Francesco Frattini (ITA)	93
5	Christian Henn (GER)	80
6	Jens Heppner (GER)	56
7	Bjarne Riis (DEN)	11
8	Georg Totschnig (AUT)	27
9	Erik Zabel (GER)	62
Directeur sportif: Walter Godefroot

Festina–Lotus FES
No.	Rider	Pos.
11	Richard Virenque (FRA)	DNF
12	Laurent Brochard (FRA)	DNF
13	Laurent Dufaux (SUI)	DNF
14	Pascal Hervé (FRA)	DNF
15	Armin Meier (SUI)	DNF
16	Christophe Moreau (FRA)	DNF
17	Didier Rous (FRA)	DNF
18	Neil Stephens (AUS)	DNF
19	Alex Zülle (SUI)	DNF
Directeur sportif: Bruno Roussel

Mercatone Uno–Bianchi MER
No.	Rider	Pos.
21	Marco Pantani (ITA)	1
22	Sergio Barbero (ITA)	DNF
23	Simone Borgheresi (ITA)	52
24	Roberto Conti (ITA)	60
25	Fabiano Fontanelli (ITA)	72
26	Riccardo Forconi (ITA)	46
27	Dimitri Konyshev (RUS)	DNF
28	Massimo Podenzana (ITA)	37
29	Mario Traversoni (ITA)	95
Directeur sportif: Giuseppe Martinelli

Mapei–Bricobi MAP
No.	Rider	Pos.
31	Franco Ballerini (ITA)	DNF
32	Giuseppe Di Grande (ITA)	9
33	Bart Leysen (BEL)	92
34	Daniele Nardello (ITA)	8
35	Wilfried Peeters (BEL)	68
36	Tom Steels (BEL)	85
37	Ján Svorada (CZE)	DNF
38	Andrea Tafi (ITA)	42
39	Stefano Zanini (ITA)	73
Directeur sportif: Patrick Lefevere

ONCE ONC
No.	Rider	Pos.
41	Laurent Jalabert (FRA)	DNF
42	Johan Bruyneel (BEL)	DNF
43	Rafael Díaz Justo (ESP)	DNF
44	Herminio Díaz Zabala (ESP)	DNF
45	Marcelino García (ESP)	DNF
46	Javier Mauleón (ESP)	DNF
47	Melcior Mauri (ESP)	DNF
48	Luis Pérez Rodríguez (ESP)	DNF
49	Roberto Sierra (ESP)	DNF
Directeur sportif: Manolo Sáiz

Rabobank RAB
No.	Rider	Pos.
51	Michael Boogerd (NED)	5
52	Erik Dekker (NED)	DNF
53	Maarten den Bakker (NED)	33
54	Patrick Jonker (NED)	34
55	Robbie McEwen (AUS)	89
56	Koos Moerenhout (NED)	44
57	Léon van Bon (NED)	63
58	Aart Vierhouten (NED)	88
59	Beat Zberg (SUI)	40
Directeur sportif: Theo De Rooy

Casino–Ag2r CSO
No.	Rider	Pos.
61	Bo Hamburger (DEN)	15
62	Christophe Agnolutto (FRA)	31
63	Stéphane Barthe (FRA)	DNF
64	Pascal Chanteur (FRA)	35
65	Jacky Durand (FRA)	65
66	Alberto Elli (ITA)	29
67	Jaan Kirsipuu (EST)	DNF
68	Rodolfo Massi (ITA)	DNF
69	Benoît Salmon (FRA)	28
Directeur sportif: Vincent Lavenu

Banesto BAN
No.	Rider	Pos.
71	Abraham Olano (ESP)	DNF
72	Marino Alonso (ESP)	DNF
73	José Luis Arrieta (ESP)	DNF
74	Manuel Beltrán (ESP)	DNF
75	Vicente Garcia-Acosta (ESP)	DNF
76	José María Jiménez (ESP)	DNF
77	Miguel Ángel Peña (ESP)	DNF
78	Orlando Rodrigues (POR)	DNF
79	César Solaun (ESP)	DNF
Directeur sportif: Eusebio Unzué

GAN GAN
No.	Rider	Pos.
81	Chris Boardman (GBR)	DNF
82	Magnus Bäckstedt (SWE)	70
83	Frédéric Moncassin (FRA)	DNF
84	Stuart O'Grady (AUS)	54
85	Eros Poli (ITA)	86
86	Eddy Seigneur (FRA)	DNF
87	François Simon (FRA)	57
88	Cédric Vasseur (FRA)	24
89	Jens Voigt (GER)	83
Directeur sportif: Roger Legeay

Lotto–Mobistar LOT
No.	Rider	Pos.
91	Laurent Madouas (FRA)	22
92	Peter Farazijn (BEL)	19
93	Joona Laukka (FIN)	DNF
94	Andrei Tchmil (UKR)	DNF
95	Andrei Teteriuk (KAZ)	20
96	Kurt Van De Wouwer (BEL)	16
97	Paul Van Hyfte (BEL)	64
98	Rik Verbrugghe (BEL)	69
99	Geert Verheyen (BEL)	23
Directeur sportif: Jean-Luc Vandenbroucke

TVM–Farm Frites TVM
No.	Rider	Pos.
101	Laurent Roux (FRA)	DNF
102	Jeroen Blijlevens (NED)	DNF
103	Steven de Jongh (NED)	DNF
104	Sergei Ivanov (RUS)	DNF
105	Servais Knaven (NED)	DNF
106	Lars Michaelsen (DEN)	DNF
107	Serguei Outschakov (UKR)	DNF
108	Peter Van Petegem (BEL)	DNF
109	Bart Voskamp (NED)	DNF
Directeur sportif: Cees Priem

Saeco–Cannondale SAE
No.	Rider	Pos.
111	Mario Cipollini (ITA)	DNF
112	Giuseppe Calcaterra (ITA)	DNF
113	Massimo Donati (ITA)	50
114	Gian Matteo Fagnini (ITA)	DNF
115	Paolo Fornaciari (ITA)	90
116	Eddy Mazzoleni (ITA)	71
117	Massimiliano Mori (ITA)	91
118	Leonardo Piepoli (ITA)	14
119	Mario Scirea (ITA)	DNF
Directeur sportif: Antonio Salutini

Française des Jeux FDJ
No.	Rider	Pos.
121	Evgeni Berzin (RUS)	25
122	Franck Bouyer (FRA)	94
123	Frédéric Guesdon (FRA)	67
124	Stéphane Heulot (FRA)	13
125	Xavier Jan (FRA)	77
126	Emmanuel Magnien (FRA)	DNF
127	Christophe Mengin (FRA)	66
128	Damien Nazon (FRA)	96
129	Maximilian Sciandri (GBR)	DNF
Directeur sportif: Marc Madiot

Cofidis COF
No.	Rider	Pos.
131	Francesco Casagrande (ITA)	DNF
132	Laurent Desbiens (FRA)	61
133	Philippe Gaumont (FRA)	DNF
134	Nicolas Jalabert (FRA)	49
135	Bobby Julich (USA)	3
136	Massimiliano Lelli (ITA)	36
137	Kevin Livingston (USA)	17
138	Roland Meier (SUI)	7
139	Christophe Rinero (FRA)	4
Directeur sportif: Bernard Quilfen

Team Polti PLT
No.	Rider	Pos.
141	Luc Leblanc (FRA)	DNF
142	Rossano Brasi (ITA)	82
143	Mirko Crepaldi (ITA)	75
144	Fabrizio Guidi (ITA)	DNF
145	Leonardo Guidi (ITA)	DNF
146	Jörg Jaksche (GER)	18
147	Silvio Martinello (ITA)	DNF
148	Axel Merckx (BEL)	10
149	Fabio Sacchi (ITA)	47
Directeur sportif: Gianluigi Stanga

Asics–CGA ASI
No.	Rider	Pos.
151	Carlo Marino Bianchi (ITA)	DNF
152	Alessio Bongioni (ITA)	DNF
153	Diego Ferrari (ITA)	76
154	Oscar Pozzi (ITA)	32
155	Fabio Roscioli (ITA)	79
156	Samuele Schiavina (ITA)	DNF
157	Aleksandre Shefer (KAZ)	DNF
158	Filippo Simeoni (ITA)	55
159	Alain Turicchia (ITA)	74
Directeur sportif: Serge Parsani

Vitalicio Seguros VIT
No.	Rider	Pos.
161	Santiago Blanco (ESP)	DNF
162	Francisco Benítez (ESP)	DNF
163	Hernán Buenahora (COL)	DNF
164	Ángel Casero (ESP)	DNF
165	Andrea Ferrigato (ITA)	DNF
166	David García (ESP)	DNF
167	Francisco Tomás García (ESP)	DNF
168	Prudencio Induráin (ESP)	DNF
169	Oliverio Rincón (COL)	DNF
Directeur sportif: Javier Minguez

Kelme–Costa Blanca KEL
No.	Rider	Pos.
171	Fernando Escartín (ESP)	DNF
172	Francisco Cabello (ESP)	DNF
173	Carlos Contreras (COL)	DNF
174	Juan José de los Ángeles (ESP)	DNF
175	José Javier Gómez (ESP)	DNF
176	Santos González (ESP)	DNF
177	José Rodríguez (ESP)	DNF
178	Marcos Serrano (ESP)	DNF
179	José Ángel Vidal (ESP)	DNF
Directeur sportif: Álvaro Pino

U.S. Postal Service USP
No.	Rider	Pos.
181	Jean-Cyril Robin (FRA)	6
182	Frankie Andreu (USA)	58
183	Dariusz Baranowski (POL)	12
184	Pascal Deramé (FRA)	84
185	Viatcheslav Ekimov (RUS)	38
186	Tyler Hamilton (USA)	51
187	George Hincapie (USA)	53
188	Marty Jemison (USA)	48
189	Peter Meinert (DEN)	45
Directeur sportif: Mark Gorski

Riso Scotti–MG Maglificio RIS
No.	Rider	Pos.
191	Fabio Baldato (ITA)	DNF
192	Vladislav Bobrik (RUS)	DNF
193	Ermanno Brignoli (ITA)	DNF
194	Roberto Caruso (ITA)	DNF
195	Stefano Casagranda (ITA)	DNF
196	Federico de Beni (ITA)	DNF
197	Nicola Minali (ITA)	DNF
198	Roberto Pistore (ITA)	DNF
199	Alessandro Spezialetti (ITA)	DNF
Directeur sportif: Emmanuele Bombini

BigMat–Auber 93 BIG
No.	Rider	Pos.
201	Pascal Lino (FRA)	78
202	Ludovic Auger (FRA)	DNF
203	Philippe Bordenave (FRA)	30
204	Thierry Bourguignon (FRA)	26
205	Viatcheslav Djavanian (RUS)	81
206	Thierry Gouvenou (FRA)	59
207	Lylian Lebreton (FRA)	41
208	Denis Leproux (FRA)	39
209	Alexei Sivakov (RUS)	87
Directeur sportif: Stephane Javalet
