= List of teams and cyclists in the 1996 Giro d'Italia =

The 1996 Giro d'Italia was the 79th edition of the Giro d'Italia, one of cycling's Grand Tours. The field consisted of 160 riders, and 98 riders finished the race.

== By rider ==
Legend
No.	Starting number worn by the rider during the Giro
Pos.	Position in the general classification
DNF	Denotes a rider who did not finish

No.	Name	Nationality	Team	Ref
1	Abraham Olano	Spain	Mapei–GB	
2	Adriano Baffi	Italy	Mapei–GB	
3	Manuel Beltrán	Spain	Mapei–GB	
4	Gianluca Bortolami	Italy	Mapei–GB	
5	Giuseppe Di Grande	Italy	Mapei–GB	
6	Manuel Fernández Ginés	Spain	Mapei–GB	
7	Daniele Nardello	Italy	Mapei–GB	
8	Andrea Noè	Italy	Mapei–GB	
9	Paolo Lanfranchi	Italy	Mapei–GB	
11	Dimitri Konyshev	Russia	Aki–Gipiemme	
12	Giuseppe Citterio	Italy	Aki–Gipiemme	
13	Michelangelo Cauz	Italy	Aki–Gipiemme	
14	Stefano Faustini	Italy	Aki–Gipiemme	
15	Gianluca Gorini	Italy	Aki–Gipiemme	
16	Erwann Menthéour	France	Aki–Gipiemme	
17	Andrey Teteryuk	Kazakhstan	Aki–Gipiemme	
18	Franco Vona	Italy	Aki–Gipiemme	
19	Denis Zanette	Italy	Aki–Gipiemme	
21	Zenon Jaskuła	Poland	Brescialat	
22	Mariano Piccoli	Italy	Brescialat	
23	Fabrizio Bontempi	Italy	Brescialat	
24	Marco Milesi	Italy	Brescialat	
25	Massimo Strazzer	Italy	Brescialat	
26	Marco Velo	Italy	Brescialat	
27	Marco Della Vedova	Italy	Brescialat	
28	Daniele Contrini	Italy	Brescialat	
29	Fausto Dotti	Italy	Brescialat	
31	Claudio Chiappucci	Italy	Carrera Jeans–Tassoni	
32	Enrico Zaina	Italy	Carrera Jeans–Tassoni	
33	Beat Zberg	Switzerland	Carrera Jeans–Tassoni	
34	Oscar Pelliccioli	Italy	Carrera Jeans–Tassoni	
35	Sergio Barbero	Italy	Carrera Jeans–Tassoni	
36	Marco Artunghi	Italy	Carrera Jeans–Tassoni	
37	Stefano Checchin	Italy	Carrera Jeans–Tassoni	
38	Filippo Simeoni	Italy	Carrera Jeans–Tassoni	
39	Mario Traversoni	Italy	Carrera Jeans–Tassoni	
41	Pavel Tonkov	Russia	Panaria–Vinavil	
42	Wladimir Belli	Italy	Panaria–Vinavil	
43	Davide Bramati	Italy	Panaria–Vinavil	
44	Roberto Conti	Italy	Panaria–Vinavil	
45	Gianni Faresin	Italy	Panaria–Vinavil	
46	Alessio Galletti	Italy	Panaria–Vinavil	
47	Marco Serpellini	Italy	Panaria–Vinavil	
48	Gabriele Missaglia	Italy	Panaria–Vinavil	
49	Zbigniew Spruch	Poland	Panaria–Vinavil	
51	Bruno Boscardin	Italy	Festina–Lotus	
52	Félix García Casas	Spain	Festina–Lotus	
53	Pascal Hervé	France	Festina–Lotus	
54	Stephen Hodge	Australia	Festina–Lotus	
55	Jean-Cyril Robin	France	Festina–Lotus	
56	Juan-Rodrigo Arenas	Spain	Festina–Lotus	
57	Lylian Lebreton	France	Festina–Lotus	
58	Joona Laukka	Finland	Festina–Lotus	
59	David Plaza	Spain	Festina–Lotus	
61	Evgeni Berzin	Russia	Gewiss Playbus	
62	Gabriele Colombo	Italy	Gewiss Playbus	
63	Stefano Zanini	Italy	Gewiss Playbus	
64	Ermanno Brignoli	Italy	Gewiss Playbus	
65	Bruno Cenghialta	Italy	Gewiss Playbus	
66	Ivan Gotti	Italy	Gewiss Playbus	
67	Alberto Volpi	Italy	Gewiss Playbus	
68	Andrea Brognara	Italy	Gewiss Playbus	
69	Davide Perona	Italy	Gewiss Playbus	
71	Nelson Rodríguez Serna	Colombia	Glacial–Selle Italia	
72	Henry Cárdenas	Colombia	Glacial–Selle Italia	
73	Ángel Camargo	Colombia	Glacial–Selle Italia	
74	Celio Roncancio	Colombia	Glacial–Selle Italia	
75	Álvaro Sierra	Colombia	Glacial–Selle Italia	
76	Roberto Caruso	Italy	Glacial–Selle Italia	
77	Nicola Miceli	Italy	Glacial–Selle Italia	
78	Stefano Giraldi	Italy	Glacial–Selle Italia	
79	Jacques Jolidon	Switzerland	Glacial–Selle Italia	
81	Laudelino Cubino	Spain	Kelme–Artiach	
82	Hernán Buenahora	Colombia	Kelme–Artiach	
83	Juan Carlos Domínguez	Spain	Kelme–Artiach	
84	Ángel Edo	Spain	Kelme–Artiach	
85	José Ángel Vidal	Spain	Kelme–Artiach	
86	Quintino Rodrigues	Portugal	Kelme–Artiach	
87	José-Luis Sanchez De La Rocha	Spain	Kelme–Artiach	
88	Ignacio García Camacho	Spain	Kelme–Artiach	
89	Leon Giner Blas	Spain	Kelme–Artiach	
91	Gianni Bugno	Italy	MG Maglificio–Technogym	
92	Stefano Casagranda	Italy	MG Maglificio–Technogym	
93	Michele Coppolillo	Italy	MG Maglificio–Technogym	
94	Carlo Finco	Italy	MG Maglificio–Technogym	
95	Fabiano Fontanelli	Italy	MG Maglificio–Technogym	
96	Angelo Lecchi	Italy	MG Maglificio–Technogym	
97	Nicola Loda	Italy	MG Maglificio–Technogym	
98	Pascal Richard	Switzerland	MG Maglificio–Technogym	
99	Marco Saligari	Italy	MG Maglificio–Technogym	
101	Marcel Wüst	Germany	MX Onda	
102	Tom Cordes	Netherlands	MX Onda	
103	Claus Michael Møller	Denmark	MX Onda	
104	Antonio Miguel Díaz	Spain	MX Onda	
105	Germán Nieto	Spain	MX Onda	
106	José Luis Santamaría	Spain	MX Onda	
107	Alfredo Irusta	Spain	MX Onda	
108	Francisco Cerezo Perales	Spain	MX Onda	
109	José Manuel Uría	Spain	MX Onda	
111	Djamolidine Abdoujaparov	Uzbekistan	Refin–Mobilvetta	
112	Felice Puttini	Italy	Refin–Mobilvetta	
113	Rodolfo Massi	Italy	Refin–Mobilvetta	
114	Cristian Salvato	Italy	Refin–Mobilvetta	
115	Leonardo Piepoli	Italy	Refin–Mobilvetta	
116	Heinz Imboden	Switzerland	Refin–Mobilvetta	
117	Mauro Bettin	Italy	Refin–Mobilvetta	
118	Sergei Uslamin	Russia	Refin–Mobilvetta	
119	Asiat Saitov	Russia	Refin–Mobilvetta	
121	Piotr Ugrumov	Russia	Roslotto–ZG Mobili	
122	Alexander Gontchenkov	Ukraine	Roslotto–ZG Mobili	
123	Daniele Sgnaolin	Italy	Roslotto–ZG Mobili	
124	Marco Zen	Italy	Roslotto–ZG Mobili	
125	Mario Manzoni	Italy	Roslotto–ZG Mobili	
126	Stefano Cattai	Italy	Roslotto–ZG Mobili	
127	Vassili Davidenko	Russia	Roslotto–ZG Mobili	
128	Viatcheslav Djavanian	Russia	Roslotto–ZG Mobili	
129	Alexei Sivakov	Russia	Roslotto–ZG Mobili	
131	Mario Cipollini	Italy	Saeco–AS Juvenes San Marino	
132	Francesco Casagrande	Italy	Saeco–AS Juvenes San Marino	
133	Giorgio Furlan	Italy	Saeco–AS Juvenes San Marino	
134	Silvio Martinello	Italy	Saeco–AS Juvenes San Marino	
135	Mario Scirea	Italy	Saeco–AS Juvenes San Marino	
136	Massimo Donati	Italy	Saeco–AS Juvenes San Marino	
137	Dario Frigo	Italy	Saeco–AS Juvenes San Marino	
138	Roberto Petito	Italy	Saeco–AS Juvenes San Marino	
139	Giuseppe Calcaterra	Italy	Saeco–AS Juvenes San Marino	
141	Riccardo Forconi	Italy	Amore & Vita–ForzArcore	
142	Andrea Patuelli	Italy	Amore & Vita–ForzArcore	
143	Glenn Magnusson	Sweden	Amore & Vita–ForzArcore	
144	Dario Andriotto	Italy	Amore & Vita–ForzArcore	
145	Maurizio De Pasquale	Italy	Amore & Vita–ForzArcore	
146	Roberto Pelliconi	Italy	Amore & Vita–ForzArcore	
147	Marco Vergnani	Italy	Amore & Vita–ForzArcore	
148	Nicolaj Bo Larsen	Denmark	Amore & Vita–ForzArcore	
149	Michele Laddomada	Italy	Amore & Vita–ForzArcore	
151	Mirko Rossato	Italy	Scrigno–Blue Storm	
152	Fabrizio Guidi	Italy	Scrigno–Blue Storm	
153	Filippo Casagrande	Italy	Scrigno–Blue Storm	
154	Francesco Secchiari	Italy	Scrigno–Blue Storm	
155	Andrea Vatteroni	Italy	Scrigno–Blue Storm	
156	Davide Casarotto	Italy	Scrigno–Blue Storm	
157	Alexandr Shefer	Kazakhstan	Scrigno–Blue Storm	
158	Cristian Gasperoni	Italy	Scrigno–Blue Storm	
159	Amilcare Tronca	Italy	Scrigno–Blue Storm	
161	Dirk Baldinger	Germany	Team Polti	
162	Mirko Crepaldi	Italy	Team Polti	
163	Mauro Gianetti	Italy	Team Polti	
164	Giuseppe Guerini	Italy	Team Polti	
165	Giovanni Lombardi	Italy	Team Polti	
166	Serguei Outschakov	Ukraine	Team Polti	
167	Gianluca Pianegonda	Italy	Team Polti	
168	Davide Rebellin	Italy	Team Polti	
169	Georg Totschnig	Austria	Team Polti	
171	Lars Kristian Johnsen	Norway	TVM–Farm Frites	
172	Steffen Kjærgaard	Norway	TVM–Farm Frites	
173	Stéphane Pétilleau	France	TVM–Farm Frites	
174	Vladimir Poulnikov	Ukraine	TVM–Farm Frites	
175	Laurent Roux	France	TVM–Farm Frites	
176	Hendrik Redant	Belgium	TVM–Farm Frites	
177	Jesper Skibby	Denmark	TVM–Farm Frites	
178	Niels van der Steen	Netherlands	TVM–Farm Frites	
179	Martin van Steen	Netherlands	TVM–Farm Frites	
