= 1997 Ronde van Nederland =

Dutch cycling race

These are the results for the 37th edition of the Ronde van Nederland cycling race, which was held from August 26 to August 30, 1997. The race started in Tilburg (North Brabant) and finished after 895.7 kilometres in Landgraaf (Limburg).

== Stages ==
=== 26-08-1997: Tilburg-Alkmaar, 199 km ===
RANK	CYCLIST	TEAM	TIME
1.	Endrio Leoni (ITA)	Aki - Safi	04:53:57
2.	Jeroen Blijlevens (NED)	TVM - Farm Frites	—
3.	Ján Svorada (CZE)	Mapei - GB	—

=== 27-08-1997: Alkmaar-Haarlem, 168 km ===
RANK	CYCLIST	TEAM	TIME
1.	Robbie McEwen (AUS)	Rabobank	04:04:05
2.	Léon van Bon (NED)	Rabobank	—
3.	Endrio Leoni (ITA)	Aki - Safi	—

=== 28-08-1997: Hoogeveen-Denekamp, 91 km ===
RANK	CYCLIST	TEAM	TIME
1.	Robbie McEwen (AUS)	Rabobank	02:05:31
2.	Jeremy Hunt (GBR)	Banesto	—
3.	Léon van Bon (NED)	Rabobank	—

=== 28-08-1997: Nordhorn-Denekamp (Time Trial), 23 km ===
RANK	CYCLIST	TEAM	TIME
1.	Erik Dekker (NED)	Rabobank	00:27:02
2.	Peter Meinert Nielsen (DEN)	US Postal Service	+ 0.06
3.	Jan Ullrich (GER)	Team Deutsche Telekom	+ 0.14

=== 29-08-1997: Almelo-Venray, 178 km ===
RANK	CYCLIST	TEAM	TIME
1.	Erik Zabel (GER)	Team Deutsche Telekom	04:43:10
2.	Jeroen Blijlevens (NED)	TVM - Farm Frites	—
3.	Marco Zanotti (ITA)	Aki - Safi	—

=== 30-08-1997: Venray-Landgraaf, 236 km ===
RANK	CYCLIST	TEAM	TIME
1.	Giovanni Lombardi (ITA)	Team Deutsche Telekom	06:01:16
2.	Federico de Beni (ITA)	Brescialat - Oyster	—
3.	Viatcheslav Ekimov (RUS)	US Postal Service	—

== Final classification ==
RANK	CYCLIST	TEAM	TIME
1.	Erik Dekker (NED)	Rabobank	22:14:52
2.	Peter Meinert Nielsen (DEN)	US Postal Service	+ 0.15
3.	Jan Ullrich (GER)	Team Deutsche Telekom	+ 0.23
4.	Viatcheslav Ekimov (RUS)	US Postal Service	+ 0.24
5.	Erik Breukink (NED)	Rabobank	+ 0.36
6.	Johan Museeuw (BEL)	Mapei - GB	+ 0.40
7.	José Vicente García (ESP)	Banesto	+ 0.46
8.	Servais Knaven (NED)	TVM - Farm Frites	+ 0.49
9.	Peter Van Petegem (BEL)	TVM - Farm Frites	+ 0.55
10.	Bart Voskamp (NED)	TVM - Farm Frites	+ 1.01
