= Roberto Matute =

Spanish footballer

Personal information
- Full name: Roberto Matute Puras
- Date of birth: 26 August 1972 (age 54)
- Place of birth: San Asensio, Spain
- Height: 1.82 m (5 ft 11 1/2 in)
- Position: Forward

Youth career
- Náxara
- Logroñés

Senior career*
Years	Team	Apps	(Gls)
1991–1994	Logroñés B	88	(28)
1992–1996	Logroñés	55	(5)
1996–1998	Chaves	60	(12)
1998–1999	Belenenses	26	(8)
1999	Dundee	5	(1)
2000	Burgos	16	(4)
2000–2003	Gramenet	95	(16)
2003–2004	Recreación	3	(0)
Total		348	(74)
- * Club domestic league appearances and goals

Roberto Matute Puras (born 26 August 1972) is a Spanish former professional footballer who played as a forward.

== Club career ==
Born in San Asensio, La Rioja, Matute made his professional debut with local club CD Logroñés, but could never impose in its first team: after totalling just seven La Liga matches in his first two years he appeared relatively more, going on to experience one promotion and relegation. His only goals in the top flight came in the 1994–95 campaign, against Albacete Balompié (1–1 home draw) and RCD Español (same result and venue).

Aged 24, Matute moved to neighbouring Portugal where he would spend the next three seasons, with G.D. Chaves and C.F. Os Belenenses, helping the latter return to the country's Primeira Liga in 1998–99 with eight goals. In 1999 he signed with Dundee F.C. in the Scottish Premier League, but returned to his homeland after only two months – with one start and one goal against Hibernian to his credit– joining Segunda División B side Burgos CF.

Matute continued playing in the third tier until his retirement at the age of 32, with UDA Gramenet and CD Recreación (named Logroñés CF in 2005).
