= 1997 Grand Prix de Denain =

Race details
- Dates: 24 April 1997
- Stages: 1
- Distance: 189 km (117 mi)
- Winning time: 4h 14' 41"

Results
	Winner	Ludo Dierckxsens (BEL)
	Second	Henk Vogels (AUS)
	Third	Stuart O'Grady (AUS)

The 1997 Grand Prix de Denain was the 39th edition of the Grand Prix de Denain cycle race and was held on 24 April 1997. The race started in Raismes and finished in Denain. The race was won by Ludo Dierckxsens.

== General classification ==
Final general classification

Rank	Rider	Time
1	Ludo Dierckxsens (BEL)	4h 14' 41"
2	Henk Vogels (AUS)	+ 0"
3	Stuart O'Grady (AUS)	+ 0"
4	Davide Casarotto (ITA)	+ 0"
5	Rolf Järmann (SUI)	+ 0"
6	Frédéric Moncassin (FRA)	+ 16"
7	Jaan Kirsipuu (EST)	+ 16"
8	Marcel Wüst (GER)	+ 16"
9	Piotr Wadecki (POL)	+ 16"
10	Damien Nazon (FRA)	+ 16"
