= 1995 Vuelta a España =

Race details
- Dates: 2–24 September
- Stages: 21 + Prologue
- Distance: 3,750 km (2,330 mi)
- Winning time: 95h 30' 33"

Results
Jersey awarded to the overall winner	Winner	Laurent Jalabert (FRA)	(ONCE)
	Second	Abraham Olano (ESP)	(Mapei–GB–Latexco)
	Third	Johan Bruyneel (BEL)	(ONCE)
Jersey awarded to the points classification winner	Points	Laurent Jalabert (FRA)	(ONCE)
Jersey awarded to the mountains classification winner	Mountains	Laurent Jalabert (FRA)	(ONCE)
Jersey awarded to the sprints classification winner	Sprints	Steffen Wesemann (GER)	(Team Telekom)
	Team	ONCE	

The 50th Edition Vuelta a España (Tour of Spain), a long-distance bicycle stage race and one of the three grand tours, was held from 2 September to 24 September 1995. It consisted of 21 stages covering a total of 3,750 km (2,330 mi), and was won by Laurent Jalabert of the ONCE cycling team. Jalabert won the three classification competitions – the general classification, the points classification and the mountains classification being only the third rider (after Eddy Merckx in the 1968 Giro d'Italia and the 1969 Tour de France, and Tony Rominger in the 1993 Vuelta a España) to win all three major classifications in a Grand Tour.

The 1995 Vuelta was the first edition that was not held in April and May, as had previously been the case, but instead in September as the last of the three Grand Tours of the year. This was done to attract more high-profile riders, who before had preferred to ride the Giro d'Italia or the Tour de France, which both took place very closely to the Vuelta's timeslot.

== Background ==
The Mapei squad arrived in disarray, after one of their lead riders, Fernando Escartín, announced that he would move to Kelme the following year. He was therefore left out of the team, which was led by Abraham Olano. The starting field also included Laurent Jalabert, Alex Zülle, former winner Melcior Mauri (all ONCE), Marco Pantani (Carrera Jeans–Tassoni) and a then unknown Jan Ullrich (Team Telekom) in his first ever Grand Tour appearance.

== Route and stages ==
Stage characteristics and winners
Stage	Date	Course	Distance	Type	Winner
P	2 September	Zaragoza	7 km (4.3 mi)	Individual time trial	Abraham Olano (ESP)
1	3 September	Zaragoza to Logroño	186.6 km (115.9 mi)	Plain stage	Nicola Minali (ITA)
2	4 September	San Asensio to Santander	223.5 km (138.9 mi)	Plain stage	Gianluca Pianegonda (ITA)
3	5 September	Santander to Alto del Naranco	206.0 km (128.0 mi)	Hilly stage	Laurent Jalabert (FRA)
4	6 September	Tapia de Casariego to A Coruña	82.6 km (51.3 mi)	Plain stage	Marcel Wüst (GER)
5	7 September	A Coruña to Ourense	179.8 km (111.7 mi)	Plain stage	Laurent Jalabert (FRA)
6	8 September	Ourense to Zamora	264.0 km (164.0 mi)	Plain stage	Nicola Minali (ITA)
7	9 September	Salamanca	41.0 km (25.5 mi)	Individual time trial	Abraham Olano (ESP)
8	10 September	Salamanca to Ávila	219.8 km (136.6 mi)	Stage with mountain(s)	Laurent Jalabert (FRA)
9	11 September	Ávila to Palazuelos de Eresma	122.5 km (76.1 mi)	Stage with mountain(s)	Jesper Skibby (DEN)
10	12 September	Córdoba to Seville	208.5 km (129.6 mi)	Plain stage	Jeroen Blijlevens (NED)
11	13 September	Seville to Marbella	162.5 km (101.0 mi)	Plain stage	Nicola Minali (ITA)
12	14 September	Marbella to Sierra Nevada	238.5 km (148.2 mi)	Stage with mountain(s)	Bert Dietz (GER)
13	15 September	Olula del Río to Murcia	181.0 km (112.5 mi)	Hilly stage	Christian Henn (GER)
14	16 September	Elche to Valencia	207.0 km (128.6 mi)	Plain stage	Marcel Wüst (GER)
15	17 September	Barcelona to Estadi Olímpic Lluís Companys	154.0 km (95.7 mi)	Hilly stage	Laurent Jalabert (FRA)
	18 September	Rest day			
16	19 September	Tàrrega to Pla de Beret	197.3 km (122.6 mi)	Stage with mountain(s)	Alex Zülle (SUI)
17	20 September	Salardu (Naut Aran) to Luz Ardiden (France)	179.2 km (111.3 mi)	Stage with mountain(s)	Laurent Jalabert (FRA)
18	21 September	Luz-Saint-Sauveur (France) to Sabiñánigo	157.8 km (98.1 mi)	Stage with mountain(s)	Asiat Saitov (RUS)
19	22 September	Sabiñánigo to Calatayud	227.7 km (141.5 mi)	Plain stage	Adriano Baffi (ITA)
20	23 September	Alcalá de Henares	41.6 km (25.8 mi)	Individual time trial	Abraham Olano (ESP)
21	24 September	Alcalá de Henares to Madrid	147.5 km (91.7 mi)	Plain stage	Marcel Wüst (GER)
	Total		3,750 km (2,330 mi)		

== Race overview ==
The race started with a prologue time trial in Zaragoza, won by Olano, two seconds ahead of Jalabert. The latter would move into the leader's golden jersey after stage 3, based on a stage win at Alto del Naranco. Olano moved closer in the general classification after the stage-7 time trial in Salamanca, but only gained 23 seconds on Jalabert due to a fall and a puncture along the route. On stage 8 to Ávila, Jalabert attacked almost from the beginning. Olano, left isolated, lost 4:40 minutes and all hopes of winning the Vuelta. Over the course of the two time trials, Olano gained 2:42 minutes on Jalabert, enough to make up for his losses on all stages but the one to Ávila. From this point on, Jalabert only attacked the field close to the finish line, collecting few advantages and some bonus seconds. His lead was so comfortable that he was able to abort an attack on the way to Sierra Nevada and gift the stage win to escapee Bert Dietz (Team Telekom).

== Classification leadership ==
Classification leadership by stage
Stage	Winner	General classification	Points classification	Mountains classification
P	Abraham Olano	Abraham Olano	Abraham Olano	not awarded
1	Nicola Minali	Abraham Olano	Laurent Jalabert	Marco Artunghi
2	Gianluca Pianegonda	Gianluca Pianegonda	Laurent Jalabert	Laurent Jalabert
3	Laurent Jalabert	Laurent Jalabert	Laurent Jalabert	Laurent Jalabert
4	Marcel Wüst	Laurent Jalabert	Laurent Jalabert	Laurent Jalabert
5	Laurent Jalabert	Laurent Jalabert	Laurent Jalabert	Laurent Jalabert
6	Nicola Minali	Laurent Jalabert	Laurent Jalabert	Laurent Jalabert
7	Abraham Olano	Laurent Jalabert	Laurent Jalabert	Laurent Jalabert
8	Laurent Jalabert	Laurent Jalabert	Laurent Jalabert	Laurent Jalabert
9	Jesper Skibby	Laurent Jalabert	Laurent Jalabert	Laurent Jalabert
10	Jeroen Blijlevens	Laurent Jalabert	Laurent Jalabert	Laurent Jalabert
11	Nicola Minali	Laurent Jalabert	Laurent Jalabert	Laurent Jalabert
12	Bert Dietz	Laurent Jalabert	Laurent Jalabert	Laurent Jalabert
13	Christian Henn	Laurent Jalabert	Laurent Jalabert	Laurent Jalabert
14	Marcel Wüst	Laurent Jalabert	Laurent Jalabert	Laurent Jalabert
15	Laurent Jalabert	Laurent Jalabert	Laurent Jalabert	Laurent Jalabert
16	Alex Zülle	Laurent Jalabert	Laurent Jalabert	Laurent Jalabert
17	Laurent Jalabert	Laurent Jalabert	Laurent Jalabert	Laurent Jalabert
18	Asiat Saitov	Laurent Jalabert	Laurent Jalabert	Laurent Jalabert
19	Adriano Baffi	Laurent Jalabert	Laurent Jalabert	Laurent Jalabert
20	Abraham Olano	Laurent Jalabert	Laurent Jalabert	Laurent Jalabert
21	Marcel Wüst	Laurent Jalabert	Laurent Jalabert	Laurent Jalabert
Final		Laurent Jalabert	Laurent Jalabert	Laurent Jalabert

== Final classification ==
Rank	Rider	Team	Time
1	Laurent Jalabert (FRA)	ONCE	95h 30' 33s
2	Abraham Olano (ESP)	Mapei–GB–Latexco	4' 22s
3	Johan Bruyneel (BEL)	ONCE	6' 48s
4	Melcior Mauri (ESP)	ONCE	8' 04s
5	Richard Virenque (FRA)	Festina–Lotus	11' 38s
6	Roberto Pistore (ITA)	Polti–Vaporetto	11' 54s
7	David García (ESP)	Banesto	13' 50s
8	Daniel Clavero (ESP)	Artiach	15' 03s
9	Michele Bartoli (ITA)	Mercatone Uno–Saeco	19' 14s
10	Stefano Della Santa (ITA)	Mapei–GB	19' 42s
