= Alessio Bongioni =

Italian cyclist

Personal information
- Born: 24 April 1975 (age 51)

Cycling career
- Sport: Cycling
- Role: Rider

Alessio Bongioni (born 24 April 1975) is an Italian racing cyclist. He rode in the 1998 Tour de France.
