= Diego Ferrari =

Italian cyclist

Personal information
- Born: 17 November 1970 (age 55) Cremona, Italy

Cycling career
- Sport: Cycling
- Role: Rider

Diego Ferrari (born 17 November 1970) is an Italian former professional racing cyclist. He rode in three editions of the Giro d'Italia and won Coppa Collecchio in 1996.
