= Olula del Río =

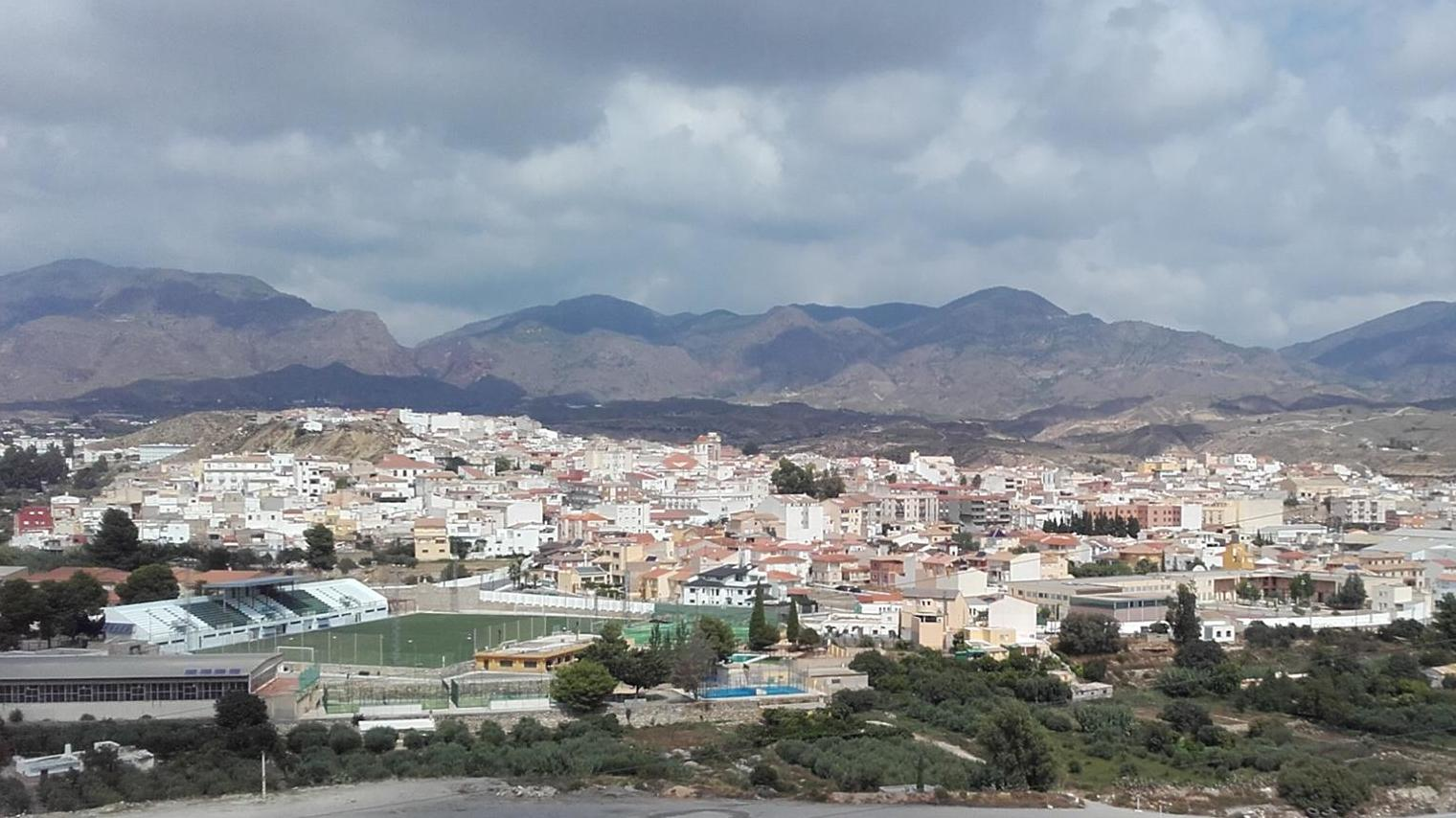

- Flag Coat of arms

- Location within Province of Almería Location within Andalusia Location within Spain
- Coordinates: 37°21′N 2°17′W
- Country: Spain
- Community: Andalusia
- Municipality: Almería

Government
  - Mayor: Antonio Martínez Pascual (PP)

Area
  - Total: 23 km^{2} (8.9 sq mi)
- Elevation: 482 m (1,581 ft)

Population (2025-01-01)
  - Total: 6,506
  - Density: 280/km^{2} (730/sq mi)
- Time zone: UTC+1 (CET)
  - Summer (DST): UTC+2 (CEST)

Olula del Río is a municipality of Almería province, in the autonomous community of Andalusia, Spain.

Located in the Almanzora valley, neighbouring villages are Macael, Purchena and Fines.

The village hosts the Museum Casa Ibáñez, a remarkable repository of modern and contemporary art including pictures of the Olula-born artist Andrés García Ibáñez and other works from Ibáñez personal collection.

== Demographics ==
Historical population
Year	Pop.	±%
1999	6,008	—
2000	5,927	−1.3%
2001	6,049	+2.1%
2002	6,141	+1.5%
2003	6,338	+3.2%
2004	6,272	−1.0%
2005	6,358	+1.4%
Source: INE (Spain)

== See also ==
- List of municipalities in Almería
