= Kaspars Ozers =

Latvian cyclist

Personal information
- Born: 15 September 1968 (age 58) Tukums, Latvia

Cycling career
- Sport: Cycling
- Current team: Retired
- Discipline: Road
- Role: Rider

Professional teams
- 1994–1996: Motorola
- 1997: Collstrop–Zeno Project
Medal record
Representing Latvia
Men's road bicycle racing
World Championships
Silver medal – second place	1993 Oslo	Amateur road race

Kaspars Ozers (born 15 September 1968, in Tukums) is a former Latvian professional cyclist who had a brief professional career during the 1990s. He took part in the Tour de France twice, as a teammate of Lance Armstrong. In 1995 one of his teammates was Fabio Casartelli. Ozers had already left the Tour when Casartelli died. He also competed in the men's individual road race at the 1996 Summer Olympics.

== Major results ==
1994
1st Stage 2 Tour de l'Eurométropole
1st Prologue Regio-Tour
8th Overall Tour of Poland

1st Points classification

1995
3rd Overall Danmark Rundt
1996
4th Overall Danmark Rundt
6th Druivenkoers-Overijse
