= Federico de Beni =

Italian cyclist

Personal information
- Full name: Federico de Beni
- Born: 23 January 1973 (age 53) Verona, Italy

Cycling career
- Sport: Cycling
- Discipline: Road
- Role: Rider

Professional teams
- 1996–1997: Brescialat
- 1998: Riso Scotti–MG Maglificio

Federico de Beni (born 23 January 1973, in Verona) is a retired road bicycle racer from Italy, who was a professional rider from 1996 to 1998.

== Teams ==
- 1996: Brescialat (Italy)
- 1997: Brescialat-Oyster (Italy)
- 1998: Riso Scotti-MG Maglificio (Italy)
