= David García (cyclist, born 1970) =

Spanish cyclist

Personal information
- Full name: David García Marquina
- Born: 11 April 1970 (age 56) Pamplona, Spain

Cycling career
- Sport: Cycling
- Current team: Retired
- Discipline: Road
- Role: Rider

Professional teams
- 1994–1995: Banesto
- 1996–1997: Equipo Euskadi
- 1998–1999: Vitalicio Seguros
- 2000: Jazztel-Costa de Almería

David García Marquina (born 11 April 1970 in Pamplona) is a Spanish former professional cyclist. He rode in 6 editions of the Vuelta a España and 1 Tour de France.

== Major results ==
1988
1st Road race, National Junior Road Championships
1993
1st Road race, Mediterranean Games
1994
1st Vuelta a Mallorca
3rd Vuelta a La Rioja
1995
7th Overall Vuelta a España
1996
3rd Overall Volta ao Alentejo
