= Gianluca Pianegonda =

Italian cyclist

Personal information
- Born: September 23, 1968 (age 58) Thiene, Italy

Cycling career
- Sport: Cycling
- Current team: Retired
- Discipline: Road
- Role: Rider

Professional teams
- 1995-1996: Polti
- 1997-1998: Mapei
- 1999: Lampre

Major wins
- 1 stage Vuelta a España (1995)

Gianluca Pianegonda (born September 23, 1968) is an Italian former racing cyclist. His most notable result was winning stage 2 of the 1995 Vuelta a España. He also held the leader's jersey for one day.

== Palmares ==
1986
1st Giro di Basilicata
1989
2nd Giro del Belvedere
1994
1st Gran Premio Palio del Recioto
1st Trofeo Gianfranco Bianchin
1st stage 8 Niedersachsen-Rundfahrt
1995
1st stage 1 Regio-Tour
1st stage 2 Vuelta a España
2nd Regio-Tour
3rd Grand Prix d'Ouverture La Marseillaise
1996
2nd Classic Haribo
3rd Brabantse Pijl
3rd Kuurne–Brussels–Kuurne
3rd Tirreno–Adriatico
1997
1st Brabantse Pijl
2nd Tirreno–Adriatico
