= San Asensio =

- Municipality
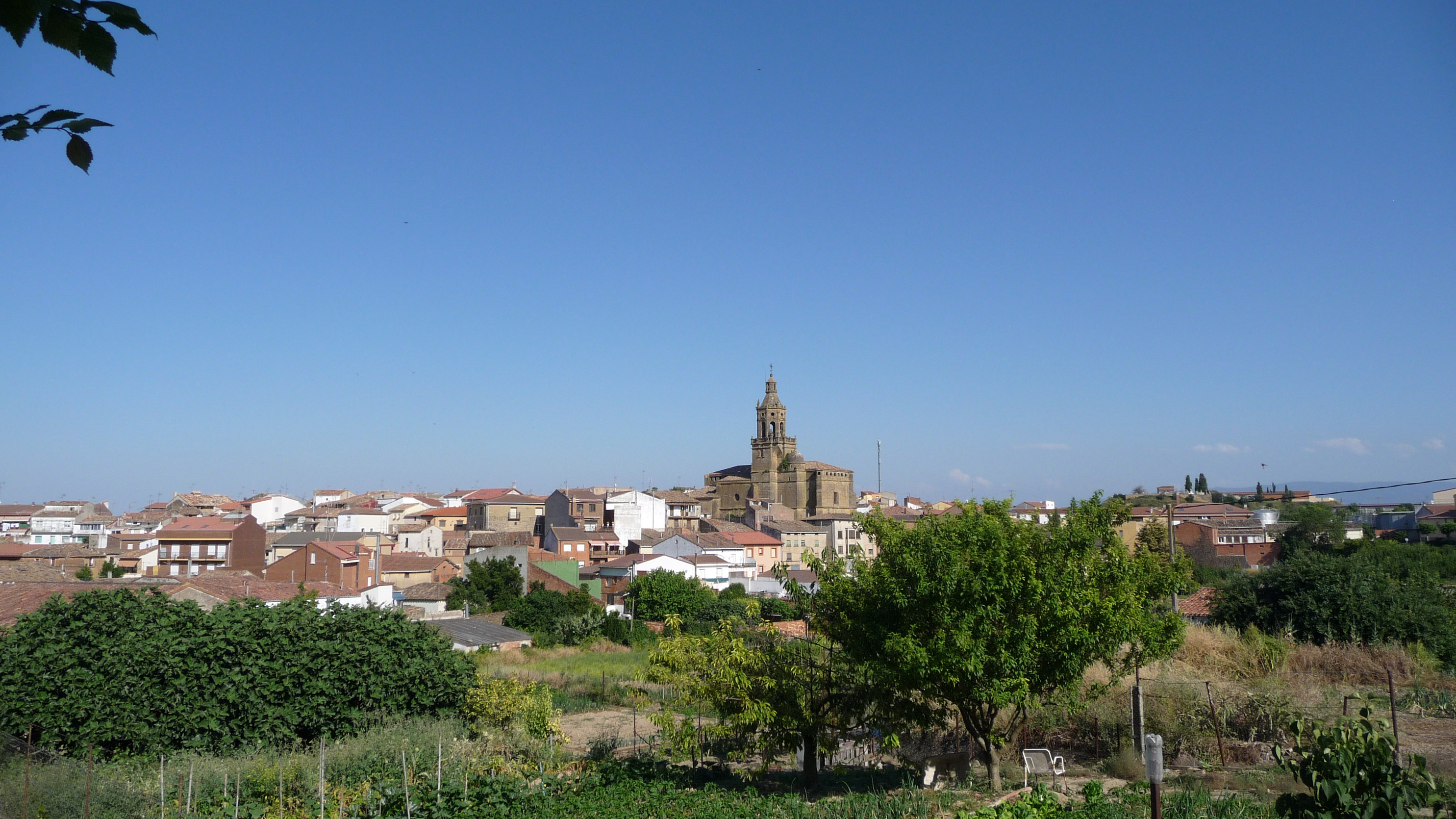

- Coat of arms

- Location within La Rioja, Spain Location within Spain
- Country: Spain
- Autonomous community: La Rioja
- Comarca: Haro

Government
  - Mayor: Juan Francisco Blanco Zalvidea (PSOE)

Area
  - Total: 32.33 km^{2} (12.48 sq mi)
- Elevation: 530 m (1,740 ft)

Population (2025-01-01)
  - Total: 1,088
  - Density: 33.65/km^{2} (87.16/sq mi)
- Demonym(s): sanasensiano, na
- Time zone: UTC+1 (CET)
  - Summer (DST): UTC+2 (CET)
- Website: www.sanasensio.org

San Asensio is a municipality and town in the La Rioja autonomous community, northern Spain.

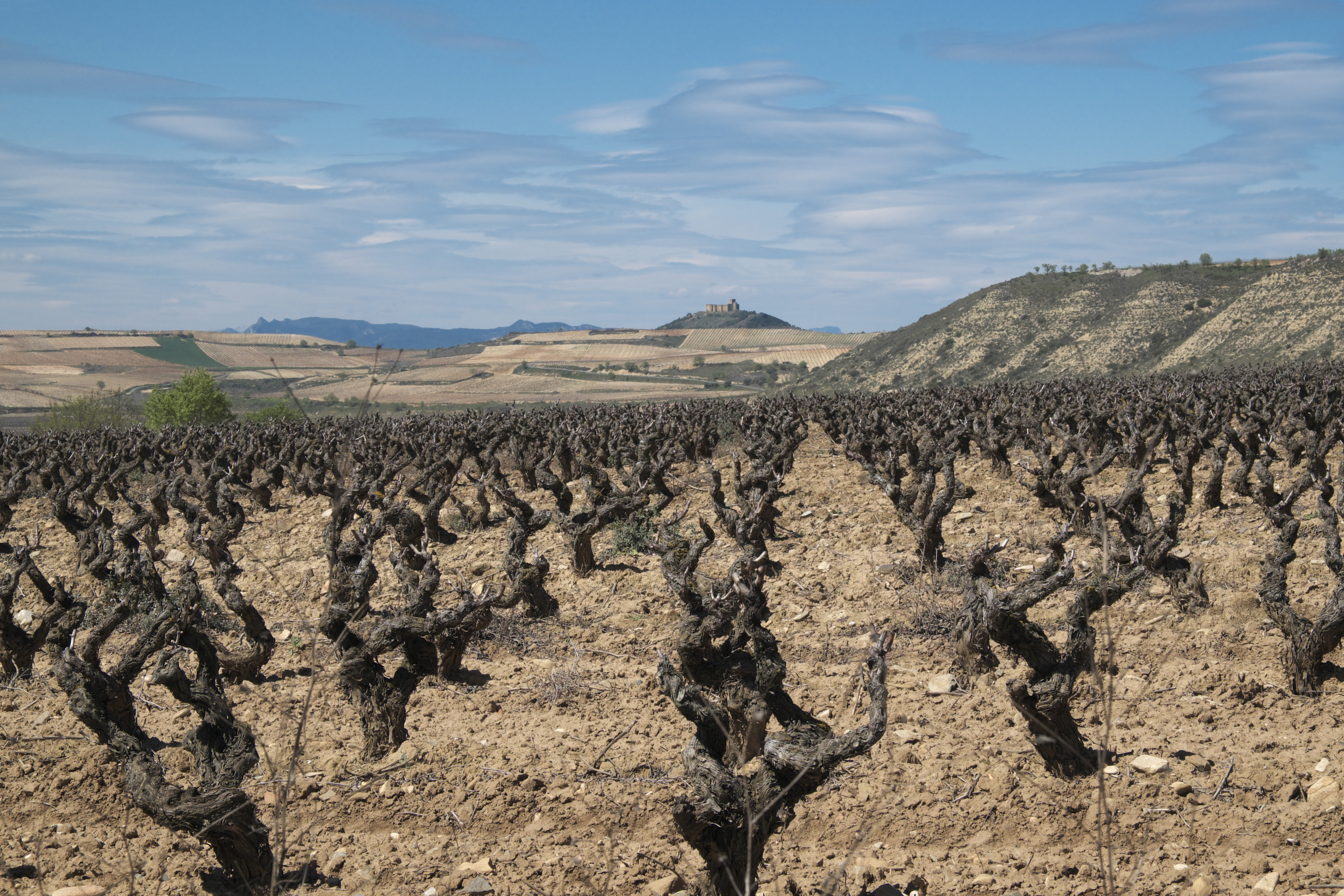
The vineyards of San Asensio. In the distance is a medieval castle.

== Viticulture ==
San Asensio has a tradition of wine production and is known for its rosés. Production is regulated by the Denominación de origen system. The Rioja DOC is divided into 3 sub-regions, San Asensio being in Rioja Alta.
