= Bert Dietz =

German cyclist (born 1969)

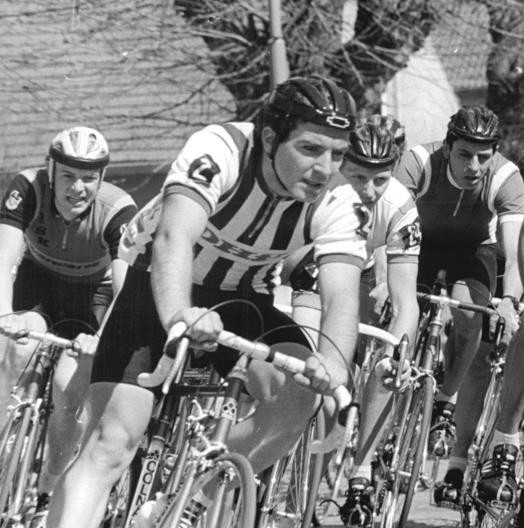
- Dietz in 1988

Personal information
- Born: 9 February 1969 (age 57) Leipzig, Germany

Cycling career
- Sport: Cycling
- Current team: Retired
- Discipline: Road
- Role: Rider

Professional teams
- 1994–1998: Team Telekom
- 1999–2000: Team Nürnberger

Major wins
- Grand Tours Vuelta a España 1 individual stage (1995)

Bert Dietz (born 9 February 1969) is a German former racing cyclist. He won the Hessen-Rundfahrt in 1992.

== Career ==
In 1993, Dietz became national amateur road race champion in Germany, and became professional cyclist for Team Telekom. The biggest win of his career came already in 1995, when he won the queen stage in the Vuelta a España; he had ridden in the attack that day and was caught by leader Laurent Jalabert, but Jalabert allowed Dietz to finish first.

In 1996, Dietz was second in the Tour of Sweden, and in 1997 he won a stage in the Vuelta an Aragon. In 1999 he moved to RSG Nürnberg, and in 2000 he ended his career, with the World Championship road race being his final race. The next year, he started as a team leader for Team Olympiapark München.

== Doping confession ==
On 21 May 2007, Dietz admitted in a TV-show for ARD that he had regularly used EPO since 1995, helped by the staff and medical team of the Telekom team. His confession triggered more confessions of former teammates, including Tour de France winner Bjarne Riis.

== Major results ==
1990
2nd Overall Peace Race

1st Stage 3

2nd Overall Tour du Loir et Cher E Provost
1991
7th Overall Peace Race

1st Stage 6

1992
2nd Overall Peace Race

1st Stage 5

1995
1st Stage 12 Vuelta a España
1996
2nd Overall Tour of Sweden

1st Stage 3b

2nd HEW Cyclassics
3rd Trofeo Luis Puig
1997
1st Stage 1 Vuelta a Aragón
2nd Overall Bayern Rundfahrt
5th Overall Driedaagse van De Panne-Koksijde
1998
1st Stage 7 Peace Race
1999
9th E3 Prijs Vlaanderen
2000
1st Stage 6 Peace Race
6th Overall Niedersachsen Rundfahrt
