= Ermanno Brignoli =

Italian cyclist (born 1969)

Personal information
- Born: 31 August 1969 (age 57) Alzano Lombardo, Italy

Cycling career
- Sport: Cycling
- Current team: Retired
- Discipline: Road
- Role: Rider

Professional teams
- 1995–1998: Gewiss–Ballan
- 1999–2002: Mercatone Uno

Ermanno Brignoli (born 31 August 1969) is a former Italian cyclist.

Grand Tour general classification results timeline

Grand Tour	1995	1996	1997	1998	1999	2000	2001
Giro d'Italia	—	75	DNF	69	DNF	82	97
Tour de France	—	—	—	DNF	—	59	—
Vuelta a España	28	97	—	—	—	—	DNF

Legend
—	Did not compete
DNF	Did not finish
