= Francisco Benítez (cyclist) =

Spanish cyclist

Personal information
- Full name: Francisco Benítez Esbri
- Born: 13 October 1970 (age 56) La Vall d'Uixó, Spain

Cycling career
- Sport: Cycling
- Discipline: Road
- Role: Rider

Professional teams
- 1993–1997: Kelme–Xacobeo
- 1998–1999: Vitalicio Seguros

Francisco Benítez Esbri (born 13 October 1970) is a Spanish former road cyclist, who was professional from 1993 to 1999. He rode in two editions of the Tour de France and two of the Vuelta a España.

== Major results ==
1993
9th Overall Volta ao Algarve
1997
2nd Overall Vuelta a Mexico

1st Stage 10

2nd Trofeo Serra de Tramuntana
2nd Overall Vuelta a Mallorca
