= Marco Artunghi =

Italian cyclist

Personal information
- Born: 12 July 1969 (age 57) Chiari, Lombardy, Italy

Cycling career
- Sport: Cycling
- Role: Rider

Marco Artunghi (born 12 July 1969) is an Italian former professional racing cyclist. He rode in four editions of the Tour de France, two editions of the Giro d'Italia and one edition of the Vuelta a España.
