= Peter Meinert Nielsen =

Danish cyclist

Personal information
- Full name: Peter Meinert Nielsen
- Born: 24 May 1966 (age 60) Vejle, Denmark
- Height: 1.90 m (6 ft 3 in)
- Weight: 73 kg (161 lb; 11 st 7 lb)

Cycling career
- Sport: Cycling
- Discipline: Road
- Role: Rider

Professional teams
- 1990–1995: TVM
- 1996: Team Telekom
- 1997–1999: U.S. Postal Service
- 2000: Team Fakta

Peter Meinert Nielsen (born 24 May 1966) is a retired road bicycle racer from Denmark, who was a professional rider from 1990 to 2000. He represented his native country in the men's individual road race at the 1988 Summer Olympics in Seoul, South Korea.

== Major results ==
1986
9th Overall Tour of Sweden
1987
2nd Grand Prix de France
1989
1st Stage 5 Tour of Sweden (ITT)
3rd Grand Prix de France
1990
2nd Overall GP Tell
1992
2nd Overall Hofbrau Cup
1993
2nd Overall Vuelta a Asturias
9th Grand Prix des Nations
1994
3rd Gran Piemonte
7th Grand Prix des Nations
1995
7th Overall 4 Jours de Dunkerque
7th Overall Danmark Rundt
1996
4th Road race, National Road Championships
1997
2nd Overall Ronde van Nederland
2nd Overall Danmark Rundt
3rd Time trial, National Road Championships
6th Overall Tour de Romandie
1998
2nd Time trial, National Road Championships
3rd Overall Danmark Rundt
