= Asiat Saitov =

Russian cyclist

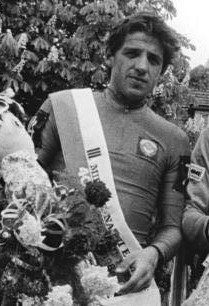
- Asiat Saitov in 1987

Personal information
- Full name: Asiat Saitov
- Born: 1 January 1965 (age 61) Samara, Russian SFSR, Soviet Union
- Height: 1.83 m (6 ft 0 in)
- Weight: 79 kg (174 lb)

Cycling career
- Sport: Cycling
- Current team: Retired
- Discipline: Road
- Role: Rider

Professional teams
- 1990: Alfa Lum
- 1991–1994: Kelme–Ibexpress
- 1995: Artiach–Chiquilin
- 1996: Refin–Mobilvetta

Major wins
- Grand Tours Vuelta a España 2 individual stages (1990, 1995) One-day races and Classics National Road Race Championships (1992, 1995)

Asyat Mansurovich Saitov (Russian: Асят Мансурович Саитов; born 1 January 1965) is a retired Russian cyclist. He missed the 1984 Summer Olympics due to their boycott by the Soviet Union and competed at the Friendship Games instead, winning a silver medal in the team road race. The same year he won the Tour of Greece and Olympia's Tour. He also won the GP Cuprosan in 1991, Vuelta a Castilla y León in 1992, Vuelta a Mallorca in 1993 and Gran Premio de Llodio in 1994.

In 1988 he competed at the Summer Olympics in the 100 km team time trial and in the individual road race and finished in seventh and 51st place, respectively.

He is married to Svetlana Masterkova, a Russian Olympic middle-distance runner.

== Major results ==
1984
1st Overall Olympia's Tour

1st Stage 6

1st Overall Tour of Greece
1986
3rd Overall Peace Race
1990
1st Stage 19 Vuelta a España
3rd Trofeo Pantalica
1992
1st Overall Vuelta a Castilla y León
1st Road race, National Road Championships
1st Stage 5a Tour of the Basque Country
7th Trofeo Masferrer
1993
1st Stage 5 Vuelta a Aragón
1st Stage 1 Vuelta a Mallorca
2nd Road race, National Road Championships
3rd Overall Vuelta a La Rioja
3rd Trofeo Masferrer
1994
Vuelta a Castilla y León

1st Stages 1 & 4

1st Stage 4 Route du Sud
1st Stage 1 Vuelta a La Rioja
2nd Clásica de Almería
1995
1st Overall Volta ao Alentejo

1st Stages 1 & 2

1st Road race, National Road Championships
1st Stage 18 Vuelta a España
1st Stage 5a Tour of the Basque Country
7th Overall Vuelta a Murcia
1996
1st Stage 13 Volta a Portugal
9th Overall Vuelta a Murcia

=== Grand Tour general classification results timeline ===
Grand Tour	1990	1991	1992	1993	1994	1995	1996
Vuelta a España	129	DNF	72	59	105	52	—
Giro d'Italia	79	—	—	113	—	—	DNF
Tour de France	DNF	—	—	—	—	—	—

Legend
DSQ	Disqualified
DNF	Did not finish
