= Marcel Wüst =

German cyclist (born 1967)

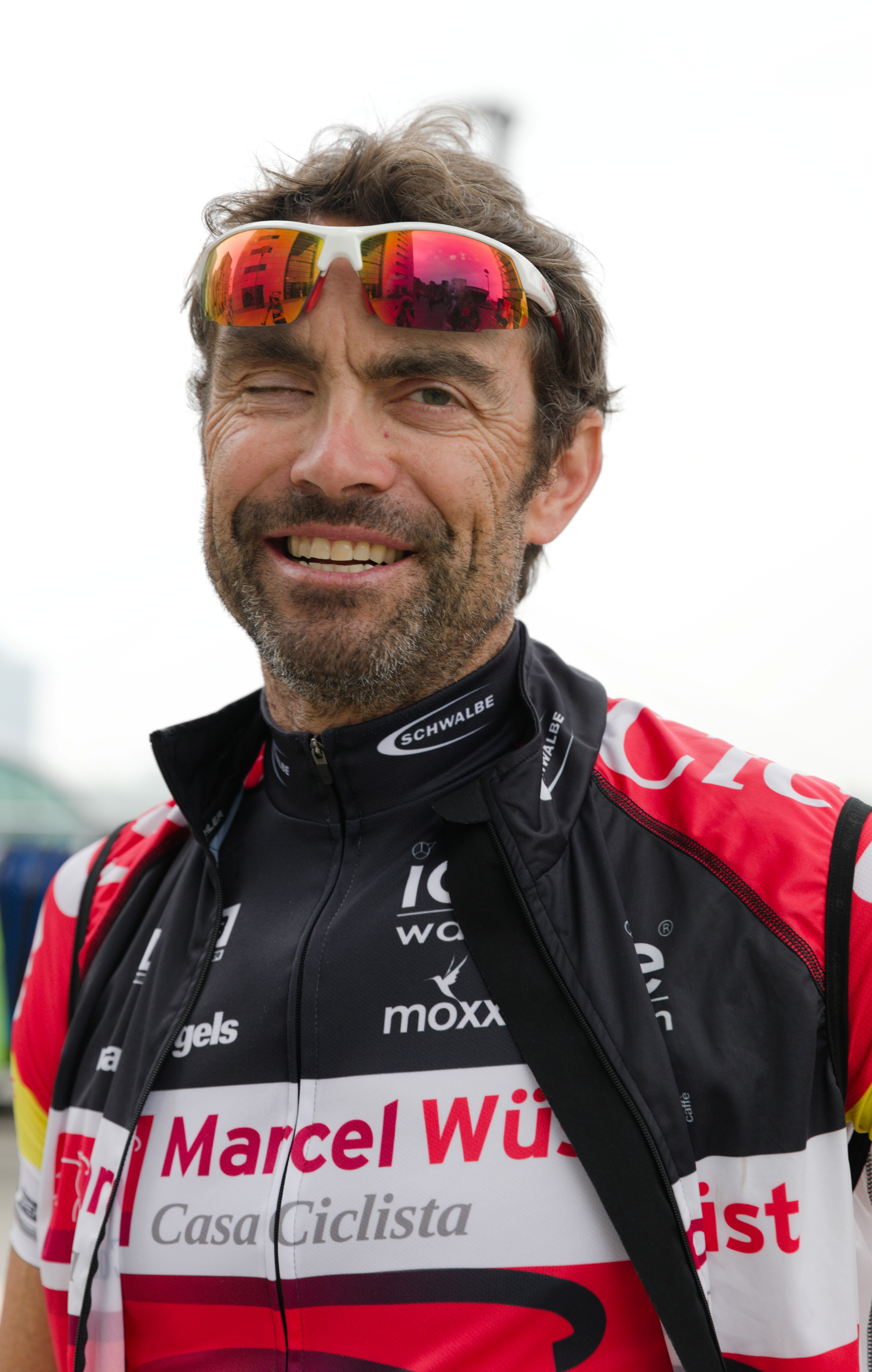
- Wüst in 2018

Personal information
- Born: 6 August 1967 (age 59) Cologne, Germany
- Height: 1.79 m (5 ft 10 1/2 in)
- Weight: 72 kg (159 lb; 11 st 5 lb)

Cycling career
- Sport: Cycling
- Current team: Retired
- Discipline: Road
- Role: Rider
- Rider type: Sprinter

Professional teams
- 1988–1992: RMO–Cycles Méral–Mavic
- 1993–1994: Novemail–Histor–Laser Computer
- 1995: Le Groupement
- 1995–1996: Castellblanch
- 1997–2001: Festina–Lotus

Managerial team
- 2002–2003: Team Coast

Major wins
- Grand Tours Tour de France 1 individual stage (2000) Vuelta a España 12 individual stages (1995, 1997, 1998, 1999) Giro d'Italia 1 individual stage (1997)

Marcel Wüst (born 6 August 1967) is a German former road bicycle racer. He won stages in all of the three Grand Tours; twelve stages in the Vuelta a España, one stage in the Tour de France and a stage in the Giro d'Italia.

In 2000, a crash left him without sight in one eye and prematurely ended his professional career. In 2002 and 2003, Wüst worked as a team manager for Team Coast. He also had a career as an analyst in broadcasting until 2008.

== Early life and family ==
Wüst was born in Cologne. He got his first taste for cycling when his family visited the 1973 Tour de France during vacation in France. He received his first racing bike at the age of ten, in 1977, before joining the local cycling club a year later. In 1984, Wüst won the opening stage of a stage race in Luxembourg. Three years later, he and fellow Cologne-based cyclist Heike Gasel became a couple. They married in January 1990. They have two sons, Alexander, born in 1998, and Oliver, born in 2006. Wüst spends three months a year in his elected second home, Noosa, Australia, while remaining a resident of his native Cologne.

== Cycling career ==
In mid-1988, Wüst turned professional with the French RMO team, taking part in that year's edition of Paris–Tours, where he won the first intermediate sprint. His first victory in the professional field came at the Ronde des Pyrenees in 1989. In 1990, he won three races and took part in his first Grand Tour, the Giro d'Italia. The following year, he started the Vuelta a España, but was forced to retire with intestinal problems after having held the point leader's jersey for a while. In 1992, he rode his first Tour de France, but retired with a broken collarbone on the first stage in San Sebastián. This gave him the unfortunate honour of being the first rider in the history of the race not to reach French soil.

For 1993, Wüst moved to the French team Novemail–Histor. Disillusioned with the lack of professionalism in the squad, he left for the Le Groupement team in 1995, only for the team to fold for financial reasons. He switched over to the Spanish Castellblanch team and started in the Vuelta a España, where he won three stages. He remained with the team for 1996, winning a stage in the Volta a Catalunya and two in the Tour DuPont. However, differences of opinion with the team's management led to Wüst signing with Festina for 1997.

With his new team, he won a stage at the 1997 Giro d'Italia and three stages of the 1997 Vuelta a España. A year later, with the team still embroiled in the Festina affair, Wüst again took two stage wins during that year's Vuelta a España. He was set to compete in the 1999 Tour de France, but a broken collarbone in a pre-Tour criterium race ruled him out. Instead, he once more started the Vuelta a España, this time taking four stage wins.

Even with his frequent victories, Wüst remained largely anonymous in his native Germany because he was riding for foreign squads as opposed to the popular Team Telekom. He moved into the public eye in 2000, when he started his second-ever Tour de France. The race began with an individual time trial at Futuroscope, which included a categorized climb. Wüst chose to go specifically for the point available for the fastest up the climb and managed to pull over the polka-dot jersey for the best climber at the end of the day, wearing it for the first days of the Tour. On stage five, he beat out his sprinting rivals to take the victory at Vitré. He eventually abandoned the Tour nine stages from the finish in Paris due to a bronchitis.

After the Tour, on 11 August 2000, Wüst took part in the Criterium d'Issoire to prepare for the upcoming Vuelta a España. Here, he collided with Jean-Michel Thilloy while competing for an intermediate sprint at 60 km/h (37 mph). Upon impact, he hit a sharp object, presumably the foot of a road barrier, head-on. He suffered severe injuries to his head, especially his right eye socket. He was treated in a clinic in Clermont-Ferrand and was soon out of mortal danger, but lost sight in his right eye. His team honoured his existing contract into 2001, but with his vision severely impaired, Wüst decided to retire from professional cycling.

=== Doping allegations ===
Following the Festina affair, which uncovered widespread use of doping on his team, Wüst was rumoured to have been using performance-enhancing drugs as well. He repeatedly denied these accusations. However, when Willy Voet, the team's soigneur, released a book about the affair in 1999, printed diary entries suggested that Wüst had injected erythropoietin (EPO) six times in January and February 1997. In his defence, Wüst pointed to his hematocrit level from mid-January of that year, which showed a level of 43.3, well below values usually considered an indication of EPO use.

== Post-cycling career ==
After his retirement, Wüst joined Team Coast as a directeur sportif. When the team folded in mid-2003 for financial problems after the signing of Jan Ullrich, he did not join the subsequent Team Bianchi, founded from the remainders of Coast. He worked as an analyst during cycling coverage for German TV station ARD. In this position, he was fired by ARD in 2007, after the broadcaster decided not to use former cyclists in their coverage in the wake of doping revelations at the Telekom team. He returned in 2008, but ARD decided not to continue its broadcast of the Tour de France after that year. On 1 April 2017, Wüst was elected into the office of vice-president, responsible for marketing and communication, of the Bund Deutscher Radfahrer, the German cycling federation.

== Major results ==
1986
1st National Junior Road race Championship
1988
1st Grand Prix de Waregem
1st Stage 3 Tour du Loir et Cher Am
1st Stage 7 Giro della Valle d'Aosta
8th GP de la Ville de Rennes
1989
1st Tour de Midi-Pyrénées
1st Stage 3a Tour de Picardie
1st Stage 4b Circuit de la Sarthe
3rd Brussels Cycling Classic
4th Cholet-Pays de la Loire
8th Paris–Tours
8th (TTT) Grand Prix de la Libération
10th Overall Route Adélie
1990
1st Stage 2 Circuit de la Sarthe
1st Stage 2b Paris–Bourges
1st Stage 6 (ITT) Vuelta a Burgos
1991
1st Stages 1 & 3 La Route du Sud
1st Stage 3 Tour Poitou-Charentes en Nouvelle-Aquitaine
Herald Sun Tour

1st Sprint classification
1st Stages 1, 11 & 14

1st Stages 6 & 8 Audax Alpine Classic
5th E3 Prijs Vlaanderen
5th Rund um Köln
6th Kuurne–Brussels–Kuurne
1992
1st Stages 1, 3, 4 & 6 La Route du Sud
1st Stage 5 Grand Prix du Midi Libre
1st Stages 4a, 6a & 10 Herald Sun Tour
1st Stages 1, 5 & 8 Audax Alpine Classic
1st Points classification Classic Brugge–De Panne
2nd Grand Prix du Morbihan
6th Grand Prix de Denain
10th Overall Tour de l'Avenir

1st Points classification
1st Stage 1

10th Dwars door België
1993
1st Grand Prix de Denain
1st Grand Prix de Plumelec-Morbihan
1st Stage 2 Volta a Catalunya
1st Stage 2 Vuelta a Burgos
Herald Sun Tour

1st Mountain classification
1st Points classification
1st Stages 3 & 7b

1st Sprint classification Vuelta a Murcia
2nd Binche–Chimay–Binche
3rd Rund um Köln
5th Paris–Camembert
7th Tour de Vendée
1994
1st Stage 1 Critérium du Dauphiné Libéré
1st Sprint classification Vuelta a Murcia
3rd Overall Herald Sun Tour

1st Points classification
1st Stage 1

1995
1st Stages 4, 14, 21 Vuelta a España
1st Stage 2 Quatre Jours de l'Aisne
1st Stage 6 Clásico RCN
Herald Sun Tour

1st Mountain classification

1st Stage 7
1996
1st Stages 3a & 11 Tour DuPont
1st Stage 4 Vuelta a Castilla y León
Volta a Catalunya

1st Points classification
1st Stage 7

Vuelta Ciclista a La Rioja

1st Points classification
1st Sprints classification
1st Stages 1a & 3

1997
1st Stages 2, 3 & 5 Vuelta a España
1st Stage 7 Giro d'Italia
1st Stage 4 La Route du Sud
Vuelta a Burgos

1st Points classification
1st Stage 5

7th Hennesee Rundfahrt
8th Grand Prix de Denain
10th Vuelta a Mallorca
1998
1st Stages 14 & 17 Vuelta a España
1st Stage 2 Circuit de la Sarthe
1st Stage 3 Vuelta a Burgos
1st Circuito de Getxo
3rd Overall Vuelta Ciclista de Chile

1st Stages 1, 6, 7, 8, 10 & 11

4th Clásica de Almería
1999
Vuelta a España

1st Stages 2, 3, 4 & 7
Held After stages 3 & 4
Held After stages 3–16

1st Stage 1 Setmana Catalana de Ciclisme
Vuelta a Aragón

1st Points classification
1st Stages 2 & 5

1st Stage 4 Tour of Galicia
1st Stage 5 Vuelta a Burgos
1st Stages 10 & 14 Commonwealth Classic
5th Trofeo Luis Puig
2000
1st Stage 5 Tour de France
1st Stages 1, 2, 3, 5 Circuit de la Sarthe
1st Stage 6 Deutschland Tour
1st Stage 1 Vuelta a Aragón
2nd Grand Prix de Rennes
5th Trofeo Palma
9th Philadelphia International Cycling Classic

=== Grand Tour results timeline ===
Grand Tour general classification results timeline
Grand Tour	1990	1991	1992	1993	1994	1995	1996	1997	1998	1999	2000
Giro d'Italia	143	—	—	—	—	—	DNF	105	DNF	—	—
Tour de France	—	—	DNF	—	—	—	—	—	—	—	DNF
/ Vuelta a España	—	DNF	—	—	—	93	—	109	106	DNF	—
