= Mirko Crepaldi =

Italian cyclist (1972–2019)

Personal information
- Born: 11 June 1972 Contarina, Italy
- Died: 28 December 2019 (aged 47) Porto Viro, Italy

Cycling career
- Sport: Cycling
- Discipline: Road
- Role: Rider

Professional teams
- 1995–2000: Polti–Granarolo–Santini
- 2001: De Nardi–Pasta Montegrappa

Mirko Crepaldi (11 June 1972 – 28 December 2019) was an Italian racing cyclist. He rode in four editions of the Tour de France, one Giro d'Italia and three editions of the Vuelta a España.

== Major results ==
1996
9th HEW Cyclassics

=== Grand Tour general classification results timeline ===
Grand Tour	1995	1996	1997	1998	1999	2000
Giro d'Italia	—	—	79	—	—	—
Tour de France	—	—	123	75	120	94
Vuelta a España	91	—	—	70	—	DNF

Legend
—	Did not compete
DNF	Did not finish
