= List of teams and cyclists in the 1994 Vuelta a España =

For the 1994 Vuelta a España, the field consisted of 169 riders; 122 finished the race.

== By rider ==
Legend
No.	Starting number worn by the rider during the Vuelta
Pos.	Position in the general classification
Time	Deficit to the winner of the general classification
DNF	Denotes a rider who did not finish

No.	Name	Nationality	Team	Pos.	Time	Ref
1	Tony Rominger	Switzerland	Mapei–CLAS	1	92h 07' 48"	
2	Federico Echave	Spain	Mapei–CLAS	22	+ 41' 14"	
3	Nico Emonds	Belgium	Mapei–CLAS	78	+ 2h 00' 39"	
4	Fernando Escartín	Spain	Mapei–CLAS	9	+ 16' 54"	
5	Iñaki Gastón	Spain	Mapei–CLAS	59	+ 1h 37' 50"	
6	Arsenio González	Spain	Mapei–CLAS	24	+ 43' 21"	
7	Jörg Müller	Switzerland	Mapei–CLAS	65	+ 1h 46' 11"	
8	Abraham Olano	Spain	Mapei–CLAS	20	+ 31' 11"	
9	Manuel Fernández Ginés	Spain	Mapei–CLAS	44	+ 1h 18' 36"	
10	Jon Unzaga	Spain	Mapei–CLAS	11	+ 20' 36"	
11	Ramón García España	Spain	Artiach–Nabisco	113	+ 2h 48' 41"	
12	Alberto Camargo	Colombia	Artiach–Nabisco	10	+ 20' 35"	
13	Luis Espinosa	Colombia	Artiach–Nabisco	12	+ 22' 43"	
14	Álvaro González de Galdeano	Spain	Artiach–Nabisco	95	+ 2h 23' 47"	
15	Félix García Casas	Spain	Artiach–Nabisco	21	+ 33' 09"	
16	Manuel Pascual	Spain	Artiach–Nabisco	76	+ 1h 58' 27"	
17	Orlando Rodrigues	Portugal	Artiach–Nabisco	96	+ 2h 24' 21"	
18	Antonio Sánchez García	Spain	Artiach–Nabisco	114	+ 2h 50' 33"	
19	Américo José Neves Da Silva	Portugal	Artiach–Nabisco	74	+ 1h 55' 04"	
20	Johnny Weltz	Denmark	Artiach–Nabisco	51	+ 1h 27' 42"	
21	Pedro Delgado	Spain	Banesto	3	+ 9' 27"	
22	Marino Alonso	Spain	Banesto	34	+ 1h 00' 23"	
23	Vicente Aparicio	Spain	Banesto	7	+ 15' 48"	
24	José Luis de Santos	Spain	Banesto	45	+ 1h 20' 05"	
25	Aitor Garmendia	Spain	Banesto	72	+ 1h 53' 38"	
26	David García Marquina	Spain	Banesto	67	+ 1h 49' 25"	
27	Melcior Mauri	Spain	Banesto	18	+ 25' 11"	
28	Carmelo Miranda	Spain	Banesto	33	+ 59' 29"	
29	Jesús Montoya	Spain	Banesto	DNF	—	
30	Mikel Zarrabeitia	Spain	Banesto	2	+ 7' 28"	
31	Eleuterio Anguita	Spain	Deportpublic	90	+ 2h 19' 11"	
32	Francisco Cerezo	Spain	Deportpublic	84	+ 2h 07' 54"	
33	Oleg Petrovich Chuzhda	Ukraine	Deportpublic	71	+ 1h 53' 22"	
34	Antonio Miguel Díaz	Spain	Deportpublic	81	+ 2h 05' 55"	
35	José Antonio Espinosa Hernández	Spain	Deportpublic	87	+ 2h 15' 49"	
36	Carlos Galarreta	Spain	Deportpublic	80	+ 2h 04' 42"	
37	Alfredo Irusta Sampedro	Spain	Deportpublic	47	+ 1h 24' 11"	
38	Luis Pérez García	Spain	Deportpublic	8	+ 16' 46"	
39	José Rodríguez	Spain	Deportpublic	37	+ 1h 04' 15"	
40	José Manuel Uría	Spain	Deportpublic	DNF	—	
41	Pello Ruiz Cabestany	Spain	Euskadi–Petronor	30	+ 54' 18"	
42	Juan Carlos González Salvador	Spain	Euskadi–Petronor	99	+ 2h 26' 20"	
43	Rubén Gorospe	Spain	Euskadi–Petronor	DNF	—	
44	Juan Tomás Martínez	Spain	Euskadi–Petronor	57	+ 1h 35' 28"	
45	Javier Murguialday	Spain	Euskadi–Petronor	48	+ 1h 24' 14"	
46	Agustín Sagasti	Spain	Euskadi–Petronor	DNF	—	
47	Íñigo Cuesta	Spain	Euskadi–Petronor	15	+ 23' 26"	
48	Roberto Laiseka	Spain	Euskadi–Petronor	54	+ 1h 31' 19"	
49	Javier Palacín	Spain	Euskadi–Petronor	DNF	—	
50	César Solaun	Spain	Euskadi–Petronor	69	+ 1h 52' 32"	
51	Laudelino Cubino	Spain	Kelme–Avianca–Gios	DNF	—	
52	Ignacio García Camacho	Spain	Kelme–Avianca–Gios	16	+ 24' 26"	
53	Ángel Edo	Spain	Kelme–Avianca–Gios	DNF	—	
54	Ángel Camargo	Colombia	Kelme–Avianca–Gios	40	+ 1h 11' 45"	
55	Francisco Benítez	Spain	Kelme–Avianca–Gios	27	+ 49' 02"	
56	Francisco Cabello	Spain	Kelme–Avianca–Gios	68	+ 1h 50' 40"	
57	Julio César Cadena	Colombia	Kelme–Avianca–Gios	50	+ 1h 26' 36"	
58	Asiat Saitov	Russia	Kelme–Avianca–Gios	105	+ 2h 34' 02"	
59	Néstor Mora	Colombia	Kelme–Avianca–Gios	60	+ 1h 38' 08"	
60	Marcos-Antonio Serrano	Spain	Kelme–Avianca–Gios	41	+ 1h 13' 16"	
61	Alex Zülle	Switzerland	ONCE	4	+ 10' 54"	
62	Erik Breukink	Netherlands	ONCE	19	+ 29' 34"	
63	Herminio Díaz Zabala	Spain	ONCE	63	+ 1h 43' 04"	
64	Laurent Jalabert	France	ONCE	75	+ 1h 55' 15"	
65	Santos Hernández	Spain	ONCE	36	+ 1h 02' 17"	
66	Alberto Leanizbarrutia	Spain	ONCE	82	+ 2h 06' 57"	
67	Luis María Díaz De Otazu	Spain	ONCE	101	+ 2h 28' 35"	
68	Oliverio Rincón	Colombia	ONCE	5	+ 13' 09"	
69	José Roberto Sierra	Spain	ONCE	32	+ 59' 19"	
70	Neil Stephens	Australia	ONCE	26	+ 46' 31"	
71	Giuseppe Calcaterra	Italy	Amore & Vita–Galatron	77	+ 1h 58' 29"	
72	Stefano Giraldi	Italy	Amore & Vita–Galatron	DNF	—	
73	Rodolfo Massi	Italy	Amore & Vita–Galatron	56	+ 1h 32' 05"	
74	Alessio Di Basco	Italy	Amore & Vita–Galatron	112	+ 2h 44' 11"	
75	Riccardo Forconi	Italy	Amore & Vita–Galatron	85	+ 2h 09' 31"	
76	Antonio Fanelli	Italy	Amore & Vita–Galatron	111	+ 2h 41' 17"	
77	Harry Lodge	Great Britain	Amore & Vita–Galatron	DNF	—	
78	Gianluca Pierobon	Italy	Amore & Vita–Galatron	104	+ 2h 31' 46"	
79	Michel Lafis	Sweden	Amore & Vita–Galatron	93	+ 2h 23' 36"	
81	Bruno Leali	Italy	Brescialat–Ceramiche Refin	DNF	—	
82	Fabrizio Bontempi	Italy	Brescialat–Ceramiche Refin	DNF	—	
83	Fabio Bordonali	Italy	Brescialat–Ceramiche Refin	DNF	—	
84	Luca Gelfi	Italy	Brescialat–Ceramiche Refin	53	+ 1h 29' 57"	
85	Flavio Giupponi	Italy	Brescialat–Ceramiche Refin	DNF	—	
86	Fabio Roscioli	Italy	Brescialat–Ceramiche Refin	55	+ 1h 31' 24"	
87	Marco Milesi	Italy	Brescialat–Ceramiche Refin	DNF	—	
88	Roberto Pelliconi	Italy	Brescialat–Ceramiche Refin	108	+ 2h 35' 33"	
89	Mauro Radaelli	Italy	Brescialat–Ceramiche Refin	118	+ 3h 03' 23"	
90	Eric Vanderaerden	Belgium	Brescialat–Ceramiche Refin	116	+ 2h 54' 11"	
91	Zenon Jaskuła	Poland	Jolly Componibili–Cage	DNF	—	
92	Sylvain Bolay	France	Jolly Componibili–Cage	DNF	—	
93	Philippe Casado	France	Jolly Componibili–Cage	119	+ 3h 04' 43"	
94	Stefano Cattai	Italy	Jolly Componibili–Cage	89	+ 2h 18' 36"	
95	Fausto Dotti	Italy	Jolly Componibili–Cage	98	+ 2h 25' 27"	
96	René Foucachon	France	Jolly Componibili–Cage	107	+ 2h 35' 25"	
97	Gianluca Gorini	Italy	Jolly Componibili–Cage	102	+ 2h 30' 36"	
98	Endrio Leoni	Italy	Jolly Componibili–Cage	DNF	—	
99	Gianni Vignaduzzi	Canada	Jolly Componibili–Cage	121	+ 3h 22' 30"	
100	Pavel Cherkasov	Russia	Jolly Componibili–Cage	DNF	—	
101	Luc Leblanc	France	Festina–Lotus	6	+ 15' 27"	
102	Jean-Claude Bagot	France	Festina–Lotus	58	+ 1h 35' 32"	
103	Arunas Cepele	Lithuania	Festina–Lotus	43	+ 1h 17' 49"	
104	Pascal Hervé	France	Festina–Lotus	28	+ 49' 19"	
105	Stephen Hodge	Australia	Festina–Lotus	31	+ 55' 16"	
106	Roberto Lezaun	Spain	Festina–Lotus	49	+ 1h 26' 15"	
107	Pascal Lino	France	Festina–Lotus	14	+ 23' 14"	
108	Roberto Torres	Spain	Festina–Lotus	88	+ 2h 18' 32"	
109	Jean-Paul van Poppel	Netherlands	Festina–Lotus	97	+ 2h 25' 04"	
110	Michel Vermote	Belgium	Festina–Lotus	109	+ 2h 37' 27"	
111	Mario Cipollini	Italy	Mercatone Uno–Medeghini	DNF	—	
112	Adriano Baffi	Italy	Mercatone Uno–Medeghini	DNF	—	
113	Simone Biasci	Italy	Mercatone Uno–Medeghini	DNF	—	
114	Massimo Donati	Italy	Mercatone Uno–Medeghini	46	+ 1h 23' 00"	
115	Gian Matteo Fagnini	Italy	Mercatone Uno–Medeghini	DNF	—	
116	Paolo Fornaciari	Italy	Mercatone Uno–Medeghini	106	+ 2h 34' 52"	
117	Paolo Lanfranchi	Italy	Mercatone Uno–Medeghini	13	+ 22' 52"	
118	Massimiliano Lelli	Italy	Mercatone Uno–Medeghini	23	+ 41' 44"	
119	Giuseppe Petito	Italy	Mercatone Uno–Medeghini	92	+ 2h 22' 35"	
120	Roberto Petito	Italy	Mercatone Uno–Medeghini	73	+ 1h 54' 02"	
121	Massimo Podenzana	Italy	Navigare–Blue Storm	29	+ 50' 28"	
122	Sergio Barbero	Italy	Navigare–Blue Storm	DNF	—	
123	Walter Castignola	Italy	Navigare–Blue Storm	DNF	—	
124	Michele Coppolillo	Italy	Navigare–Blue Storm	42	+ 1h 15' 39"	
125	Vassili Davidenko	Russia	Navigare–Blue Storm	DNF	—	
126	Roberto Giucolsi	Italy	Navigare–Blue Storm	DNF	—	
127	Luboš Lom	Czech Republic	Navigare–Blue Storm	DNF	—	
128	Roberto Pagnin	Italy	Navigare–Blue Storm	117	+ 2h 56' 23"	
129	Fabrizio Settembrini	Italy	Navigare–Blue Storm	DNF	—	
130	Massimo Strazzer	Italy	Navigare–Blue Storm	DNF	—	
131	Joaquim Gomes	Portugal	Recer–Boavista	17	+ 24' 51"	
132	Arximiro Blanco Costas	Spain	Recer–Boavista	91	+ 2h 19' 44"	
133	José Barros	Portugal	Recer–Boavista	DNF	—	
134	Cássio Freitas	Brazil	Recer–Boavista	79	+ 2h 03' 47"	
135	Fernando Manuel Dos Santos Mota	Portugal	Recer–Boavista	66	+ 1h 48' 05"	
136	Delmino Pereira	Portugal	Recer–Boavista	35	+ 1h 00' 44"	
137	José Rosa	Portugal	Recer–Boavista	DNF	—	
138	Alexandre Rodrigues Teixeira	Portugal	Recer–Boavista	83	+ 2h 07' 43"	
139	Luis Santos	Portugal	Recer–Boavista	DNF	—	
140	João Silva	Portugal	Recer–Boavista	86	+ 2h 12' 35"	
141	Romes Gainetdinov	Russia	Santa Clara-Samara	70	+ 1h 53' 18"	
142	Dimitri Tcherkachine	Russia	Santa Clara-Samara	103	+ 2h 31' 45"	
143	Vladimir Abramov	Uzbekistan	Santa Clara-Samara	122	+ 3h 37' 00"	
144	Evgueni Anachkine	Russia	Santa Clara-Samara	115	+ 2h 51' 16"	
145	Valery Batura	Russia	Santa Clara-Samara	DNF	—	
146	Vladimir Kliouchkine	Russia	Santa Clara-Samara	120	+ 3h 11' 49"	
147	Oleg Klevtsov	Russia	Santa Clara-Samara	DNF	—	
148	Manuel Rodríguez Gil	Spain	Santa Clara-Samara	DNF	—	
149	Jordi Gilabert	Spain	Santa Clara-Samara	94	+ 2h 23' 45"	
150	Eloy Santamarta	Spain	Santa Clara-Samara	DNF	—	
151	Manuel Luis Abreu Campos	Portugal	Sicasal–Acral	61	+ 1h 39' 43"	
152	David Assunção	Portugal	Sicasal–Acral	DNF	—	
153	Carlos Carneiro	Portugal	Sicasal–Acral	DNF	—	
154	Vítor Gamito	Portugal	Sicasal–Acral	DNF	—	
155	Carlos Manuel Oliveira Pinho	Portugal	Sicasal–Acral	39	+ 1h 10' 42"	
156	Quintino Rodrigues	Portugal	Sicasal–Acral	62	+ 1h 39' 52"	
157	Paulo Ferreira	Portugal	Sicasal–Acral	DNF	—	
158	Pedro Manuel Silva Rodrigues	Portugal	Sicasal–Acral	110	+ 2h 37' 28"	
159	Youri Sourkov	Kazakhstan	Sicasal–Acral	52	+ 1h 27' 59"	
160	Serafim Vieira	Portugal	Sicasal–Acral	DNF	—	
161	Robert Millar	Great Britain	TVM–Bison Kit	DNF	—	
162	Jesper Skibby	Denmark	TVM–Bison Kit	DNF	—	
163	Maarten den Bakker	Netherlands	TVM–Bison Kit	DNF	—	
164	Tristan Hoffman	Netherlands	TVM–Bison Kit	DNF	—	
165	Dag Otto Lauritzen	Norway	TVM–Bison Kit	64	+ 1h 44' 50"	
166	Roland Meier	Switzerland	TVM–Bison Kit	100	+ 2h 27' 13"	
167	Peter Meinert Nielsen	Denmark	TVM–Bison Kit	25	+ 45' 05"	
168	Rob Harmeling	Netherlands	TVM–Bison Kit	DNF	—	
169	Gert-Jan Theunisse	Netherlands	TVM–Bison Kit	DNF	—	
170	Bart Voskamp	Netherlands	TVM–Bison Kit	38	+ 1h 09' 21"	
