= 1994 Vuelta a España, Stage 1 to Stage 11 =

The 1994 Vuelta a España was the 49th edition of the Vuelta a España, one of cycling's Grand Tours. The Vuelta began in Valladolid, with an individual time trial on 25 April, and Stage 11 occurred on 5 May with a stage to Cerler. The race finished in Madrid on 15 May.

== Stage 1 ==
25 April 1994 — Valladolid to Valladolid, 9 km (5.6 mi) (ITT)

Stage 1 result and general classification after Stage 1

Rank	Rider	Team	Time
1	Tony Rominger (SUI)	Mapei–CLAS	10' 35"
2	Alex Zülle (SUI)	ONCE	+ 20"
3	Melcior Mauri (ESP)	Banesto	+ 24"
4	Gianluca Pierobon (ITA)	Amore & Vita–Galatron	+ 27"
5	Marino Alonso (ESP)	Banesto	+ 33"
6	Abraham Olano (ESP)	Mapei–CLAS	+ 34"
7	Stephen Hodge (AUS)	Festina–Lotus	s.t.
8	Adriano Baffi (ITA)	Mercatone Uno–Medeghini	+ 35"
9	Jesús Montoya (ESP)	Banesto	+ 38"
10	Pedro Delgado (ESP)	Banesto	+ 39"

== Stage 2 ==
26 April 1994 — Valladolid to Salamanca, 178.4 km (110.9 mi)

Stage 2 result

Rank	Rider	Team	Time
1	Laurent Jalabert (FRA)	ONCE	4h 34' 53"
2	Ángel Edo (ESP)	Kelme–Avianca–Gios	s.t.
3	Endrio Leoni (ITA)	Jolly Componibili–Cage	s.t.
4	Oleg Petrovich Chuzhda (UKR)	Deportpublic	s.t.
5	Juan Carlos González Salvador (ESP)	Euskadi–Petronor	s.t.
6	Antonio Fanelli (ITA)	Amore & Vita–Galatron	s.t.
7	Tristan Hoffman (NED)	TVM–Bison Kit	s.t.
8	Walter Castignola (ITA)	Navigare–Blue Storm	s.t.
9	Antonio Sánchez García (ESP)	Artiach–Nabisco	s.t.
10	Riccardo Forconi (ITA)	Amore & Vita–Galatron	s.t.

General classification after Stage 2

Rank	Rider	Team	Time
1	Tony Rominger (SUI)	Mapei–CLAS	4h 45' 28"
2	Alex Zülle (SUI)	ONCE	+ 20"
3	Melcior Mauri (ESP)	Banesto	+ 24"
4	Gianluca Pierobon (ITA)	Amore & Vita–Galatron	+ 27"
5	Adriano Baffi (ITA)	Mercatone Uno–Medeghini	s.t.
6	Marino Alonso (ESP)	Banesto	+ 33"
7	Abraham Olano (ESP)	Mapei–CLAS	+ 34"
8	Stephen Hodge (AUS)	Festina–Lotus	s.t.
9	Jesús Montoya (ESP)	Banesto	+ 38"
10	Pedro Delgado (ESP)	Banesto	+ 39"

== Stage 3 ==
27 April 1994 — Salamanca to Cáceres, 239 km (149 mi)

Stage 3 result

Rank	Rider	Team	Time
1	Laurent Jalabert (FRA)	ONCE	5h 53' 27"
2	Jean-Paul van Poppel (NED)	Festina–Lotus	s.t.
3	Adriano Baffi (ITA)	Mercatone Uno–Medeghini	s.t.
4	Ángel Edo (ESP)	Kelme–Avianca–Gios	s.t.
5	Fabrizio Bontempi (ITA)	Brescialat–Ceramiche Refin	s.t.
6	Endrio Leoni (ITA)	Jolly Componibili–Cage	s.t.
7	Juan Carlos González Salvador (ESP)	Euskadi–Petronor	s.t.
8	Manuel Luis Abreu Campos (POR)	Sicasal–Acral	s.t.
9	Tony Rominger (SUI)	Mapei–CLAS	s.t.
10	Alessio Di Basco (ITA)	Amore & Vita–Galatron	s.t.

General classification after Stage 3

Rank	Rider	Team	Time
1	Tony Rominger (SUI)	Mapei–CLAS	10h 38' 55"
2	Adriano Baffi (ITA)	Mercatone Uno–Medeghini	+ 16"
3	Melcior Mauri (ESP)	Banesto	+ 24"
4	Laurent Jalabert (FRA)	ONCE	+ 29"
5	Alex Zülle (SUI)	ONCE	s.t.
6	Gianluca Pierobon (ITA)	Amore & Vita–Galatron	+ 36"
7	Marino Alonso (ESP)	Banesto	+ 37"
8	Abraham Olano (ESP)	Mapei–CLAS	+ 38"
9	Stephen Hodge (AUS)	Festina–Lotus	s.t.
10	Jesús Montoya (ESP)	Banesto	+ 42"

== Stage 4 ==
28 April 1994 — Almendralejo to Córdoba, 235.6 km (146.4 mi)

Stage 4 result

Rank	Rider	Team	Time
1	Endrio Leoni (ITA)	Jolly Componibili–Cage	6h 36' 33"
2	Jesper Skibby (DEN)	TVM–Bison Kit	s.t.
3	Laurent Jalabert (FRA)	ONCE	s.t.
4	Ángel Edo (ESP)	Kelme–Avianca–Gios	s.t.
5	Jean-Paul van Poppel (NED)	Festina–Lotus	s.t.
6	Oleg Petrovich Chuzhda (UKR)	Deportpublic	s.t.
7	Fabrizio Bontempi (ITA)	Brescialat–Ceramiche Refin	s.t.
8	Luboš Lom (CZE)	Navigare–Blue Storm	s.t.
9	Manuel Luis Abreu Campos (POR)	Sicasal–Acral	s.t.
10	Juan Carlos González Salvador (ESP)	Euskadi–Petronor	s.t.

General classification after Stage 4

Rank	Rider	Team	Time
1	Tony Rominger (SUI)	Mapei–CLAS	17h 15' 28"
2	Laurent Jalabert (FRA)	ONCE	+ 25"
3	Melcior Mauri (ESP)	Banesto	+ 28"
4	Alex Zülle (SUI)	ONCE	+ 29"
5	Gianluca Pierobon (ITA)	Amore & Vita–Galatron	+ 36"
6	Marino Alonso (ESP)	Banesto	+ 37"
7	Abraham Olano (ESP)	Mapei–CLAS	+ 38"
8	Stephen Hodge (AUS)	Festina–Lotus	s.t.
9	Jesús Montoya (ESP)	Banesto	+ 42"
10	Pedro Delgado (ESP)	Banesto	+ 43"

== Stage 5 ==
29 April 1994 — Córdoba to Granada, 166.9 km (103.7 mi)

Stage 5 result

Rank	Rider	Team	Time
1	Laurent Jalabert (FRA)	ONCE	4h 24' 10"
2	Endrio Leoni (ITA)	Jolly Componibili–Cage	s.t.
3	Ángel Edo (ESP)	Kelme–Avianca–Gios	s.t.
4	Fabio Roscioli (ITA)	Brescialat–Ceramiche Refin	s.t.
5	Antonio Fanelli (ITA)	Amore & Vita–Galatron	s.t.
6	Simone Biasci (ITA)	Mercatone Uno–Medeghini	s.t.
7	Juan Carlos González Salvador (ESP)	Euskadi–Petronor	s.t.
8	Tony Rominger (SUI)	Mapei–CLAS	s.t.
9	Jesper Skibby (DEN)	TVM–Bison Kit	s.t.
10	Giuseppe Calcaterra (ITA)	Amore & Vita–Galatron	s.t.

General classification after Stage 5

Rank	Rider	Team	Time
1	Tony Rominger (SUI)	Mapei–CLAS	21h 39' 38"
2	Laurent Jalabert (FRA)	ONCE	+ 13"
3	Melcior Mauri (ESP)	Banesto	+ 28"
4	Alex Zülle (SUI)	ONCE	+ 29"
5	Gianluca Pierobon (ITA)	Amore & Vita–Galatron	+ 36"
6	Marino Alonso (ESP)	Banesto	+ 37"
7	Abraham Olano (ESP)	Mapei–CLAS	+ 38"
8	Stephen Hodge (AUS)	Festina–Lotus	s.t.
9	Jesús Montoya (ESP)	Banesto	+ 42"
10	Pedro Delgado (ESP)	Banesto	+ 43"

== Stage 6 ==
30 April 1994 — Granada to Sierra Nevada, 151.7 km (94.3 mi)

Stage 6 result

Rank	Rider	Team	Time
1	Tony Rominger (SUI)	Mapei–CLAS	4h 18' 09"
2	Laudelino Cubino (ESP)	Kelme–Avianca–Gios	+ 54"
3	Mikel Zarrabeitia (ESP)	Banesto	s.t.
4	Oliverio Rincón (COL)	ONCE	+ 1' 19"
5	Alex Zülle (SUI)	ONCE	s.t.
6	Luc Leblanc (FRA)	Festina–Lotus	+ 1' 27"
7	Pedro Delgado (ESP)	Banesto	+ 1' 31"
8	Jon Unzaga (ESP)	Mapei–CLAS	+ 1' 35"
9	Paolo Lanfranchi (ITA)	Mercatone Uno–Medeghini	+ 2' 36"
10	José Manuel Uría (ESP)	Deportpublic	s.t.

General classification after Stage 6

Rank	Rider	Team	Time
1	Tony Rominger (SUI)	Mapei–CLAS	25h 57' 35"
2	Mikel Zarrabeitia (ESP)	Banesto	+ 1' 53"
3	Alex Zülle (SUI)	ONCE	+ 2' 00"
4	Laudelino Cubino (ESP)	Kelme–Avianca–Gios	+ 2' 24"
5	Oliverio Rincón (COL)	ONCE	s.t.
6	Pedro Delgado (ESP)	Banesto	+ 2' 26"
7	Luc Leblanc (FRA)	Festina–Lotus	+ 3' 00"
8	Erik Breukink (NED)	ONCE	+ 3' 45"
9	Jesús Montoya (ESP)	Banesto	+ 3' 48"
10	Jon Unzaga (ESP)	Mapei–CLAS	+ 3' 53"

== Stage 7 ==
1 May 1994 — Baza to Alicante, 256.5 km (159.4 mi)

Stage 7 result

Rank	Rider	Team	Time
1	Simone Biasci (ITA)	Mercatone Uno–Medeghini	6h 08' 03"
2	Antonio Miguel Díaz Rodríguez (ESP)	Deportpublic	s.t.
3	Michel Vermote (BEL)	Festina–Lotus	+ 1' 09"
4	Massimo Strazzer (ITA)	Navigare–Blue Storm	s.t.
5	Laurent Jalabert (FRA)	ONCE	s.t.
6	Endrio Leoni (ITA)	Jolly Componibili–Cage	s.t.
7	Jesper Skibby (DEN)	TVM–Bison Kit	s.t.
8	Fabio Roscioli (ITA)	Brescialat–Ceramiche Refin	s.t.
9	Luboš Lom (CZE)	Navigare–Blue Storm	s.t.
10	Oleg Petrovich Chuzhda (UKR)	Deportpublic	s.t.

General classification after Stage 7

Rank	Rider	Team	Time
1	Tony Rominger (SUI)	Mapei–CLAS	32h 06' 47"
2	Mikel Zarrabeitia (ESP)	Banesto	+ 1' 53"
3	Alex Zülle (SUI)	ONCE	+ 2' 00"
4	Laudelino Cubino (ESP)	Kelme–Avianca–Gios	+ 2' 24"
5	Oliverio Rincón (COL)	ONCE	s.t.
6	Pedro Delgado (ESP)	Banesto	+ 2' 26"
7	Luc Leblanc (FRA)	Festina–Lotus	+ 3' 00"
8	Erik Breukink (NED)	ONCE	+ 3' 45"
9	Jesús Montoya (ESP)	Banesto	+ 3' 48"
10	Jon Unzaga (ESP)	Mapei–CLAS	+ 3' 53"

== Stage 8 ==
2 May 1994 — Benidorm to Benidorm, 39.5 km (24.5 mi) (ITT)

Stage 8 result

Rank	Rider	Team	Time
1	Tony Rominger (SUI)	Mapei–CLAS	48' 44"
2	Melcior Mauri (ESP)	Banesto	+ 53"
3	Mikel Zarrabeitia (ESP)	Banesto	+ 2' 17"
4	Jesús Montoya (ESP)	Banesto	+ 2' 18"
5	Alex Zülle (SUI)	ONCE	+ 2' 20"
6	Pedro Delgado (ESP)	Banesto	+ 2' 21"
7	Erik Breukink (NED)	ONCE	+ 2' 37"
8	Vicente Aparicio (ESP)	Banesto	+ 2' 46"
9	Abraham Olano (ESP)	Mapei–CLAS	+ 2' 56"
10	Luc Leblanc (FRA)	Festina–Lotus	+ 3' 09"

General classification after Stage 8

Rank	Rider	Team	Time
1	Tony Rominger (SUI)	Mapei–CLAS	32h 55' 31"
2	Mikel Zarrabeitia (ESP)	Banesto	+ 4' 10"
3	Alex Zülle (SUI)	ONCE	+ 4' 20"
4	Pedro Delgado (ESP)	Banesto	+ 4' 47"
5	Jesús Montoya (ESP)	Banesto	+ 6' 06"
6	Luc Leblanc (FRA)	Festina–Lotus	+ 6' 09"
7	Erik Breukink (NED)	ONCE	+ 6' 22"
8	Laudelino Cubino (ESP)	Kelme–Avianca–Gios	+ 6' 28"
9	Vicente Aparicio (ESP)	Banesto	+ 7' 02"
10	Oliverio Rincón (COL)	ONCE	+ 7' 31"

== Stage 9 ==
3 May 1994 — Benidorm to Valencia, 166 km (103 mi)

Stage 9 result

Rank	Rider	Team	Time
1	Jean-Paul van Poppel (NED)	Festina–Lotus	3h 55' 09"
2	Juan Carlos González Salvador (ESP)	Euskadi–Petronor	s.t.
3	Endrio Leoni (ITA)	Jolly Componibili–Cage	s.t.
4	Antonio Fanelli (ITA)	Amore & Vita–Galatron	s.t.
5	Michel Vermote (BEL)	Festina–Lotus	s.t.
6	Laurent Jalabert (FRA)	ONCE	s.t.
7	Ángel Edo (ESP)	Kelme–Avianca–Gios	s.t.
8	Jesper Skibby (DEN)	TVM–Bison Kit	s.t.
9	Fabio Roscioli (ITA)	Brescialat–Ceramiche Refin	s.t.
10	Gian Matteo Fagnini (ITA)	Mercatone Uno–Medeghini	s.t.

General classification after Stage 9

Rank	Rider	Team	Time
1	Tony Rominger (SUI)	Mapei–CLAS	36h 50' 40"
2	Mikel Zarrabeitia (ESP)	Banesto	+ 4' 10"
3	Alex Zülle (SUI)	ONCE	+ 4' 20"
4	Pedro Delgado (ESP)	Banesto	+ 4' 47"
5	Jesús Montoya (ESP)	Banesto	+ 6' 06"
6	Luc Leblanc (FRA)	Festina–Lotus	+ 6' 09"
7	Erik Breukink (NED)	ONCE	+ 6' 22"
8	Laudelino Cubino (ESP)	Kelme–Avianca–Gios	+ 6' 28"
9	Vicente Aparicio (ESP)	Banesto	+ 7' 02"
10	Oliverio Rincón (COL)	ONCE	+ 7' 31"

== Stage 10 ==
4 May 1994 — Igualada to Andorra-Arcalís, 205 km (127 mi)

Stage 10 result

Rank	Rider	Team	Time
1	Ángel Camargo (COL)	Kelme–Avianca–Gios	5h 18' 59"
2	Tony Rominger (SUI)	Mapei–CLAS	+ 23"
3	Alex Zülle (SUI)	ONCE	+ 25"
4	Mikel Zarrabeitia (ESP)	Banesto	s.t.
5	Laudelino Cubino (ESP)	Kelme–Avianca–Gios	s.t.
6	Oliverio Rincón (COL)	ONCE	+ 27"
7	Luc Leblanc (FRA)	Festina–Lotus	+ 29"
8	Luis Pérez García (ESP)	Deportpublic	+ 31"
9	Alberto Camargo (COL)	Artiach–Nabisco	+ 33"
10	José Manuel Uría (ESP)	Deportpublic	+ 41"

General classification after Stage 10

Rank	Rider	Team	Time
1	Tony Rominger (SUI)	Mapei–CLAS	42h 10' 02"
2	Mikel Zarrabeitia (ESP)	Banesto	+ 4' 12"
3	Alex Zülle (SUI)	ONCE	+ 4' 22"
4	Pedro Delgado (ESP)	Banesto	+ 5' 17"
5	Luc Leblanc (FRA)	Festina–Lotus	+ 6' 15"
6	Laudelino Cubino (ESP)	Kelme–Avianca–Gios	+ 6' 30"
7	Oliverio Rincón (COL)	ONCE	+ 7' 35"
8	Vicente Aparicio (ESP)	Banesto	+ 7' 39"
9	Fernando Escartín (ESP)	Mapei–CLAS	+ 8' 47"
10	Jesús Montoya (ESP)	Banesto	+ 9' 04"

== Stage 11 ==
5 May 1994 — Andorra la Vella to Cerler, 195.3 km (121.4 mi)

Stage 11 result

Rank	Rider	Team	Time
1	Tony Rominger (SUI)	Mapei–CLAS	5h 42' 50"
2	Oliverio Rincón (COL)	ONCE	+ 1"
3	Mikel Zarrabeitia (ESP)	Banesto	s.t.
4	Luis Pérez García (ESP)	Deportpublic	+ 3"
5	José Manuel Uría (ESP)	Deportpublic	+ 25"
6	Pedro Delgado (ESP)	Banesto	+ 26"
7	Jon Unzaga (ESP)	Mapei–CLAS	s.t.
8	Luc Leblanc (FRA)	Festina–Lotus	s.t.
9	Alex Zülle (SUI)	ONCE	+ 35"
10	Laudelino Cubino (ESP)	Kelme–Avianca–Gios	s.t.

General classification after Stage 11

Rank	Rider	Team	Time
1	Tony Rominger (SUI)	Mapei–CLAS	47h 52' 52"
2	Mikel Zarrabeitia (ESP)	Banesto	+ 4' 13"
3	Alex Zülle (SUI)	ONCE	+ 4' 57"
4	Pedro Delgado (ESP)	Banesto	+ 5' 43"
5	Luc Leblanc (FRA)	Festina–Lotus	+ 6' 41"
6	Laudelino Cubino (ESP)	Kelme–Avianca–Gios	+ 7' 05"
7	Oliverio Rincón (COL)	ONCE	+ 7' 36"
8	Vicente Aparicio (ESP)	Banesto	+ 9' 05"
9	Luis Pérez García (ESP)	Deportpublic	+ 9' 16"
10	Fernando Escartín (ESP)	Mapei–CLAS	+ 9' 28"
