= 1994 Vuelta a España, Stage 12 to Stage 21 =

49th edition of the Vuelta a España, one of cycling's Grand Tours

The 1994 Vuelta a España was the 49th edition of the Vuelta a España, one of cycling's Grand Tours. The Vuelta began in Valladolid, with an individual time trial on 25 April, and Stage 12 occurred on 6 May with a stage from Benasque. The race finished in Madrid on 15 May.

== Stage 12 ==
6 May 1994 — Benasque to Zaragoza, 226.7 km (140.9 mi)

Stage 12 result

Rank	Rider	Team	Time
1	Laurent Jalabert (FRA)	ONCE	5h 44' 39"
2	Jean-Paul van Poppel (NED)	Festina–Lotus	s.t.
3	Roberto Pelliconi (ITA)	Brescialat–Ceramiche Refin	+ 6"
4	Alessio Di Basco (ITA)	Amore & Vita–Galatron	s.t.
5	Roberto Pagnin (ITA)	Navigare–Blue Storm	s.t.
6	Giuseppe Petito (ITA)	Mercatone Uno–Medeghini	s.t.
7	Manuel Luis Abreu Campos (POR)	Sicasal–Acral	s.t.
8	Pedro Manuel Silva Rodrigues (POR)	Sicasal–Acral	s.t.
9	Neil Stephens (AUS)	ONCE	s.t.
10	Vassili Davidenko (ITA)	Navigare–Blue Storm	s.t.

General classification after Stage 12

Rank	Rider	Team	Time
1	Tony Rominger (SUI)	Mapei–CLAS	53h 37' 37"
2	Mikel Zarrabeitia (ESP)	Banesto	+ 4' 13"
3	Alex Zülle (SUI)	ONCE	+ 4' 57"
4	Pedro Delgado (ESP)	Banesto	+ 5' 43"
5	Luc Leblanc (FRA)	Festina–Lotus	+ 6' 41"
6	Oliverio Rincón (COL)	ONCE	+ 7' 36"
7	Vicente Aparicio (ESP)	Banesto	+ 9' 05"
8	Luis Pérez García (ESP)	Deportpublic	+ 9' 16"
9	Fernando Escartín (ESP)	Mapei–CLAS	+ 9' 28"
10	Jon Unzaga (ESP)	Mapei–CLAS	+ 10' 37"

== Stage 13 ==
7 May 1994 — Zaragoza to Pamplona, 201.6 km (125.3 mi)

Stage 13 result

Rank	Rider	Team	Time
1	Laurent Jalabert (FRA)	ONCE	5h 24' 29"
2	Endrio Leoni (ITA)	Jolly Componibili–Cage	s.t.
3	Ángel Edo (ESP)	Kelme–Avianca–Gios	s.t.
4	Juan Carlos González Salvador (ESP)	Euskadi–Petronor	s.t.
5	Javier Palacín (ESP)	Euskadi–Petronor	s.t.
6	Antonio Fanelli (ITA)	Amore & Vita–Galatron	s.t.
7	Oleg Petrovich Chuzhda (UKR)	Deportpublic	s.t.
8	Giuseppe Petito (ITA)	Mercatone Uno–Medeghini	s.t.
9	Roberto Pagnin (ITA)	Navigare–Blue Storm	s.t.
10	Roberto Pelliconi (ITA)	Brescialat–Ceramiche Refin	s.t.

General classification after Stage 13

Rank	Rider	Team	Time
1	Tony Rominger (SUI)	Mapei–CLAS	59h 02' 06"
2	Mikel Zarrabeitia (ESP)	Banesto	+ 4' 13"
3	Alex Zülle (SUI)	ONCE	+ 4' 57"
4	Pedro Delgado (ESP)	Banesto	+ 5' 43"
5	Luc Leblanc (FRA)	Festina–Lotus	+ 6' 41"
6	Oliverio Rincón (COL)	ONCE	+ 7' 36"
7	Vicente Aparicio (ESP)	Banesto	+ 9' 05"
8	Luis Pérez García (ESP)	Deportpublic	+ 9' 16"
9	Fernando Escartín (ESP)	Mapei–CLAS	+ 9' 28"
10	Jon Unzaga (ESP)	Mapei–CLAS	+ 10' 37"

== Stage 14 ==
8 May 1994 — Pamplona to Sierra de la Demanda, 174 km (108 mi)

Stage 14 result

Rank	Rider	Team	Time
1	Tony Rominger (SUI)	Mapei–CLAS	4h 23' 42"
2	Oliverio Rincón (COL)	ONCE	+ 37"
3	Alex Zülle (SUI)	ONCE	+ 45"
4	Mikel Zarrabeitia (ESP)	Banesto	s.t.
5	Pedro Delgado (ESP)	Banesto	+ 51"
6	Alberto Camargo (COL)	Artiach–Nabisco	+ 56"
7	Íñigo Cuesta (ESP)	Euskadi–Petronor	+ 1' 02"
8	Luc Leblanc (FRA)	Festina–Lotus	+ 1' 17"
9	Luis Pérez García (ESP)	Deportpublic	+ 1' 20"
10	José Manuel Uría (ESP)	Deportpublic	+ 1' 21"

General classification after Stage 14

Rank	Rider	Team	Time
1	Tony Rominger (SUI)	Mapei–CLAS	63h 25' 48"
2	Mikel Zarrabeitia (ESP)	Banesto	+ 4' 58"
3	Alex Zülle (SUI)	ONCE	+ 5' 42"
4	Pedro Delgado (ESP)	Banesto	+ 6' 34"
5	Luc Leblanc (FRA)	Festina–Lotus	+ 7' 58"
6	Oliverio Rincón (COL)	ONCE	+ 8' 13"
7	Vicente Aparicio (ESP)	Banesto	+ 10' 26"
8	Luis Pérez García (ESP)	Deportpublic	+ 10' 36"
9	Fernando Escartín (ESP)	Mapei–CLAS	+ 11' 39"
10	Alberto Camargo (COL)	Artiach–Nabisco	+ 11' 58"

== Stage 15 ==
9 May 1994 — Santo Domingo de la Calzada to Santander, 209.3 km (130.1 mi)

Stage 15 result

Rank	Rider	Team	Time
1	Alessio Di Basco (ITA)	Amore & Vita–Galatron	5h 44' 29"
2	Laurent Jalabert (FRA)	ONCE	s.t.
3	Roberto Pagnin (ITA)	Navigare–Blue Storm	s.t.
4	Vassili Davidenko (ITA)	Navigare–Blue Storm	s.t.
5	Américo José Neves Da Silva (POR)	Artiach–Nabisco	s.t.
6	Juan Carlos González Salvador (ESP)	Euskadi–Petronor	s.t.
7	Nico Emonds (BEL)	Mapei–CLAS	s.t.
8	Giuseppe Petito (ITA)	Mercatone Uno–Medeghini	s.t.
9	Gianluca Pierobon (ITA)	Amore & Vita–Galatron	s.t.
10	Paolo Lanfranchi (ITA)	Mercatone Uno–Medeghini	s.t.

General classification after Stage 15

Rank	Rider	Team	Time
1	Tony Rominger (SUI)	Mapei–CLAS	69h 10' 17"
2	Mikel Zarrabeitia (ESP)	Banesto	+ 4' 58"
3	Alex Zülle (SUI)	ONCE	+ 5' 42"
4	Pedro Delgado (ESP)	Banesto	+ 6' 34"
5	Luc Leblanc (FRA)	Festina–Lotus	+ 7' 58"
6	Oliverio Rincón (COL)	ONCE	+ 8' 13"
7	Vicente Aparicio (ESP)	Banesto	+ 10' 26"
8	Luis Pérez García (ESP)	Deportpublic	+ 10' 36"
9	Fernando Escartín (ESP)	Mapei–CLAS	+ 11' 39"
10	Alberto Camargo (COL)	Artiach–Nabisco	+ 11' 58"

== Stage 16 ==
10 May 1994 — Santander to Lakes of Covadonga, 147.7 km (91.8 mi)

Stage 16 result

Rank	Rider	Team	Time
1	Laurent Jalabert (FRA)	ONCE	3h 42' 20"
2	Roberto Torres (ESP)	Festina–Lotus	+ 9"
3	Arunas Cepele (LTU)	Festina–Lotus	+ 1' 05"
4	Juan Tomás Martínez (ESP)	Euskadi–Petronor	+ 1' 16"
5	Carlos Galarreta (ESP)	Deportpublic	+ 1' 57"
6	Fabio Roscioli (ITA)	Brescialat–Ceramiche Refin	+ 2' 09"
7	Johnny Weltz (DEN)	Artiach–Nabisco	+ 2' 22"
8	Tony Rominger (SUI)	Mapei–CLAS	+ 2' 47"
9	Oliverio Rincón (COL)	ONCE	+ 2' 49"
10	Mikel Zarrabeitia (ESP)	Banesto	+ 2' 51"

General classification after Stage 16

Rank	Rider	Team	Time
1	Tony Rominger (SUI)	Mapei–CLAS	72h 55' 24"
2	Mikel Zarrabeitia (ESP)	Banesto	+ 5' 02"
3	Pedro Delgado (ESP)	Banesto	+ 6' 55"
4	Alex Zülle (SUI)	ONCE	+ 7' 30"
5	Oliverio Rincón (COL)	ONCE	+ 8' 15"
6	Luc Leblanc (FRA)	Festina–Lotus	+ 9' 47"
7	Vicente Aparicio (ESP)	Banesto	+ 10' 49"
8	Luis Pérez García (ESP)	Deportpublic	+ 11' 21"
9	Fernando Escartín (ESP)	Mapei–CLAS	+ 13' 19"
10	Paolo Lanfranchi (ITA)	Mercatone Uno–Medeghini	+ 13' 45"

== Stage 17 ==
11 May 1994 — Cangas de Onís to Monte Naranco, 150.4 km (93.5 mi)

Stage 17 result

Rank	Rider	Team	Time
1	Bart Voskamp (NED)	TVM–Bison Kit	3h 52' 02"
2	Tony Rominger (SUI)	Mapei–CLAS	+ 23"
3	Pedro Delgado (ESP)	Banesto	+ 36"
4	Mikel Zarrabeitia (ESP)	Banesto	s.t.
5	Luc Leblanc (FRA)	Festina–Lotus	+ 38"
6	Laurent Jalabert (FRA)	ONCE	+ 43"
7	Alex Zülle (SUI)	ONCE	s.t.
8	Jon Unzaga (ESP)	Mapei–CLAS	s.t.
9	Ignacio García Camacho (ESP)	Kelme–Avianca–Gios	s.t.
10	Fernando Escartín (ESP)	Mapei–CLAS	s.t.

General classification after Stage 17

Rank	Rider	Team	Time
1	Tony Rominger (SUI)	Mapei–CLAS	76h 47' 49"
2	Mikel Zarrabeitia (ESP)	Banesto	+ 5' 15"
3	Pedro Delgado (ESP)	Banesto	+ 7' 08"
4	Alex Zülle (SUI)	ONCE	+ 7' 50"
5	Oliverio Rincón (COL)	ONCE	+ 8' 45"
6	Luc Leblanc (FRA)	Festina–Lotus	+ 10' 02"
7	Vicente Aparicio (ESP)	Banesto	+ 11' 09"
8	Luis Pérez García (ESP)	Deportpublic	+ 11' 41"
9	Fernando Escartín (ESP)	Mapei–CLAS	+ 13' 39"
10	Paolo Lanfranchi (ITA)	Mercatone Uno–Medeghini	+ 14' 05"

== Stage 18 ==
12 May 1994 — Ávila to Ávila, 189 km (117 mi)

Stage 18 result

Rank	Rider	Team	Time
1	Giuseppe Calcaterra (ITA)	Amore & Vita–Galatron	5h 12' 53"
2	Michele Coppolillo (ITA)	Navigare–Blue Storm	+ 1"
3	Alex Zülle (SUI)	ONCE	+ 1' 47"
4	José Rodríguez (ESP)	Deportpublic	+ 2' 02"
5	Massimiliano Lelli (ITA)	Mercatone Uno–Medeghini	+ 2' 03"
6	Abraham Olano (ESP)	Mapei–CLAS	s.t.
7	Jon Unzaga (ESP)	Mapei–CLAS	s.t.
8	Paolo Lanfranchi (ITA)	Mercatone Uno–Medeghini	s.t.
9	Pascal Lino (FRA)	Festina–Lotus	s.t.
10	Massimo Podenzana (ITA)	Navigare–Blue Storm	s.t.

General classification after Stage 18

Rank	Rider	Team	Time
1	Tony Rominger (SUI)	Mapei–CLAS	82h 02' 45"
2	Mikel Zarrabeitia (ESP)	Banesto	+ 5' 15"
3	Pedro Delgado (ESP)	Banesto	+ 7' 08"
4	Alex Zülle (SUI)	ONCE	+ 7' 34"
5	Oliverio Rincón (COL)	ONCE	+ 8' 45"
6	Luc Leblanc (FRA)	Festina–Lotus	+ 10' 02"
7	Luis Pérez García (ESP)	Deportpublic	+ 11' 41"
8	Vicente Aparicio (ESP)	Banesto	+ 13' 08"
9	Fernando Escartín (ESP)	Mapei–CLAS	+ 13' 39"
10	Paolo Lanfranchi (ITA)	Mercatone Uno–Medeghini	+ 14' 05"

== Stage 19 ==
13 May 1994 — Ávila to Palazuelos de Eresma, 171 km (106 mi)

Stage 19 result

Rank	Rider	Team	Time
1	Marino Alonso (ESP)	Banesto	4h 21' 04"
2	Roberto Pagnin (ITA)	Navigare–Blue Storm	+ 6' 49"
3	Riccardo Forconi (ITA)	Amore & Vita–Galatron	+ 6' 51"
4	Roberto Lezaun (ESP)	Festina–Lotus	+ 6' 57"
5	Néstor Mora (COL)	Kelme–Avianca–Gios	+ 7' 32"
6	Manuel Pascual (ESP)	Artiach–Nabisco	s.t.
7	Tony Rominger (SUI)	Mapei–CLAS	+ 8' 05"
8	Alex Zülle (SUI)	ONCE	+ 8' 10"
9	Pedro Delgado (ESP)	Banesto	s.t.
10	Mikel Zarrabeitia (ESP)	Banesto	s.t.

General classification after Stage 19

Rank	Rider	Team	Time
1	Tony Rominger (SUI)	Mapei–CLAS	86h 31' 54"
2	Mikel Zarrabeitia (ESP)	Banesto	+ 5' 20"
3	Pedro Delgado (ESP)	Banesto	+ 7' 13"
4	Alex Zülle (SUI)	ONCE	+ 7' 39"
5	Oliverio Rincón (COL)	ONCE	+ 8' 54"
6	Luc Leblanc (FRA)	Festina–Lotus	+ 10' 11"
7	Luis Pérez García (ESP)	Deportpublic	+ 11' 50"
8	Vicente Aparicio (ESP)	Banesto	+ 13' 17"
9	Fernando Escartín (ESP)	Mapei–CLAS	+ 13' 48"
10	Paolo Lanfranchi (ITA)	Mercatone Uno–Medeghini	+ 14' 31"

== Stage 20 ==
14 May 1994 — Segovia to Palazuelos de Eresma, 53 km (33 mi) (ITT)

Stage 20 result

Rank	Rider	Team	Time
1	Tony Rominger (SUI)	Mapei–CLAS	1h 08' 59"
2	Melcior Mauri (ESP)	Banesto	+ 1' 35"
3	Abraham Olano (ESP)	Mapei–CLAS	+ 2' 06"
4	Erik Breukink (NED)	ONCE	s.t.
5	Mikel Zarrabeitia (ESP)	Banesto	+ 2' 08"
6	Pedro Delgado (ESP)	Banesto	+ 2' 14"
7	Pascal Lino (FRA)	Festina–Lotus	+ 2' 21"
8	Vicente Aparicio (ESP)	Banesto	+ 2' 31"
9	Oleg Petrovich Chuzhda (UKR)	Deportpublic	+ 2' 43"
10	Fernando Escartín (ESP)	Mapei–CLAS	+ 3' 06"

General classification after Stage 20

Rank	Rider	Team	Time
1	Tony Rominger (SUI)	Mapei–CLAS	87h 40' 53"
2	Mikel Zarrabeitia (ESP)	Banesto	+ 7' 28"
3	Pedro Delgado (ESP)	Banesto	+ 9' 27"
4	Alex Zülle (SUI)	ONCE	+ 10' 54"
5	Oliverio Rincón (COL)	ONCE	+ 13' 09"
6	Luc Leblanc (FRA)	Festina–Lotus	+ 15' 27"
7	Vicente Aparicio (ESP)	Banesto	+ 15' 48"
8	Luis Pérez García (ESP)	Deportpublic	+ 16' 46"
9	Fernando Escartín (ESP)	Mapei–CLAS	+ 16' 54"
10	Alberto Camargo (COL)	Artiach–Nabisco	+ 20' 35"

== Stage 21 ==
15 May 1994 — Palazuelos de Eresma to Madrid, 165.7 km (103.0 mi)

Stage 21 result

Rank	Rider	Team	Time
1	Laurent Jalabert (FRA)	ONCE	4h 26' 55"
2	Eric Vanderaerden (BEL)	Brescialat–Ceramiche Refin	s.t.
3	Roberto Pelliconi (ITA)	Brescialat–Ceramiche Refin	s.t.
4	Antonio Fanelli (ITA)	Amore & Vita–Galatron	s.t.
5	Roberto Pagnin (ITA)	Navigare–Blue Storm	s.t.
6	Roland Meier (SUI)	TVM–Bison Kit	s.t.
7	José Luis de Santos (ESP)	Banesto	s.t.
8	Gianluca Gorini (ITA)	Jolly Componibili–Cage	s.t.
9	Alessio Di Basco (ITA)	Amore & Vita–Galatron	s.t.
10	Paolo Fornaciari (ITA)	Mercatone Uno–Medeghini	s.t.

General classification after Stage 21

Rank	Rider	Team	Time
1	Tony Rominger (SUI)	Mapei–CLAS	92h 07' 48"
2	Mikel Zarrabeitia (ESP)	Banesto	+ 7' 28"
3	Pedro Delgado (ESP)	Banesto	+ 9' 27"
4	Alex Zülle (SUI)	ONCE	+ 10' 54"
5	Oliverio Rincón (COL)	ONCE	+ 13' 09"
6	Luc Leblanc (FRA)	Festina–Lotus	+ 15' 27"
7	Vicente Aparicio (ESP)	Banesto	+ 15' 48"
8	Luis Pérez García (ESP)	Deportpublic	+ 16' 46"
9	Fernando Escartín (ESP)	Mapei–CLAS	+ 16' 54"
10	Alberto Camargo (COL)	Artiach–Nabisco	+ 20' 35"
