= List of teams and cyclists in the 1992 Tour de France =

List of cyclists

There were 22 teams in the 1992 Tour de France, each composed of 9 cyclists. Sixteen teams qualified because they were the top 16 of the FICP ranking in May 1992; six other teams were given wildcards in June 1992.

== Teams ==
Qualified teams

- Banesto
- Gatorade–Chateau d'Ax
- Carrera Jeans–Vagabond
- Castorama
- Z
- Motorola
- ONCE
- TVM–Sanyo
- Panasonic–Sportlife
- Buckler–Colnago–Decca
- Ariostea
- CLAS–Cajastur
- Lotto–Mavic–MBK
- Lotus–Festina
- GB–MG Maglificio
- PDM–Ultima–Concorde

Invited teams

- RMO–Onet
- Helvetia–Commodore
- Postobón–Manzana–Ryalcao
- Amaya Seguros
- Team Telekom
- Tulip Computers

== Cyclists ==
=== By starting number ===
Legend
No.	Starting number worn by the rider during the Tour
Pos.	Position in the general classification
DNF	Denotes a rider who did not finish

No.	Name	Nationality	Team	Pos.	Ref
1	Miguel Indurain	Spain	Banesto	1	
2	Marino Alonso	Spain	Banesto	98	
3	Jean-François Bernard	France	Banesto	39	
4	Armand de Las Cuevas	France	Banesto	DNF	
5	Pedro Delgado	Spain	Banesto	6	
6	Aitor Garmendia	Spain	Banesto	108	
7	Julián Gorospe	Spain	Banesto	47	
8	Fabrice Philipot	France	Banesto	DNF	
9	José Ramón Uriarte	Spain	Banesto	63	
11	Gianni Bugno	Italy	Gatorade–Chateau d'Ax	3	
12	Andrea Chiurato	Italy	Gatorade–Chateau d'Ax	112	
13	Dirk De Wolf	Belgium	Gatorade–Chateau d'Ax	86	
14	Giovanni Fidanza	Italy	Gatorade–Chateau d'Ax	103	
15	Laurent Fignon	France	Gatorade–Chateau d'Ax	23	
16	Abelardo Rondón	Colombia	Gatorade–Chateau d'Ax	55	
17	Pello Ruiz Cabestany	Spain	Gatorade–Chateau d'Ax	72	
18	Mario Scirea	Italy	Gatorade–Chateau d'Ax	107	
19	Valerio Tebaldi	Italy	Gatorade–Chateau d'Ax	DNF	
21	Claudio Chiappucci	Italy	Carrera Jeans–Vagabond	2	
22	Djamolidine Abdoujaparov	Uzbekistan	Carrera Jeans–Vagabond	DNF	
23	Guido Bontempi	Italy	Carrera Jeans–Vagabond	75	
24	Mario Chiesa	Italy	Carrera Jeans–Vagabond	117	
25	Massimo Ghirotto	Italy	Carrera Jeans–Vagabond	40	
26	Alessandro Gianelli	Italy	Carrera Jeans–Vagabond	DNF	
27	Giancarlo Perini	Italy	Carrera Jeans–Vagabond	8	
28	Stephen Roche	Ireland	Carrera Jeans–Vagabond	9	
29	Fabio Roscioli	Italy	Carrera Jeans–Vagabond	90	
31	Charly Mottet	France	RMO	DNF	
32	Éric Caritoux	France	RMO	37	
33	Thierry Laurent	France	RMO	79	
34	Pascal Lino	France	RMO	5	
35	Christophe Manin	France	RMO	105	
36	Ronan Pensec	France	RMO	52	
37	Dante Rezze	France	RMO	DNF	
38	Richard Virenque	France	RMO	25	
39	Marcel Wüst	Germany	RMO	DNF	
41	Luc Leblanc	France	Castorama	DNF	
42	Dominique Arnould	France	Castorama	48	
43	Jean-Claude Bagot	France	Castorama	DNF	
44	Thierry Bourguignon	France	Castorama	29	
45	Jacky Durand	France	Castorama	119	
46	Yvon Ledanois	France	Castorama	42	
47	Thierry Marie	France	Castorama	114	
48	Jean-Cyril Robin	France	Castorama	44	
49	Gérard Rué	France	Castorama	15	
51	Greg LeMond	United States	Z	DNF	
52	Éric Boyer	France	Z	12	
53	Thierry Claveyrolat	France	Z	33	
54	Jean-Claude Colotti	France	Z	95	
55	Bruno Cornillet	France	Z	DNF	
56	Gilbert Duclos-Lassalle	France	Z	DNF	
57	Atle Kvålsvoll	Norway	Z	49	
58	François Lemarchand	France	Z	104	
59	Jérôme Simon	France	Z	27	
61	Andrew Hampsten	United States	Motorola	4	
62	Phil Anderson	Australia	Motorola	81	
63	Frankie Andreu	United States	Motorola	110	
64	Steve Bauer	Canada	Motorola	DNF	
65	Andy Bishop	United States	Motorola	DNF	
66	Michel Dernies	Belgium	Motorola	106	
67	Ron Kiefel	United States	Motorola	DNF	
68	Max Sciandri	Italy	Motorola	DNF	
69	Sean Yates	Great Britain	Motorola	83	
71	Gilles Delion	France	Helvetia-Commodore	58	
72	Rolf Aldag	Germany	Helvetia-Commodore	DNF	
73	Laurent Dufaux	Switzerland	Helvetia-Commodore	DNF	
74	Fabian Jeker	Switzerland	Helvetia-Commodore	DNF	
75	Dominik Krieger	Germany	Helvetia-Commodore	53	
76	Jean-Claude Leclercq	France	Helvetia-Commodore	DNF	
77	Erich Maechler	Switzerland	Helvetia-Commodore	DNF	
78	Henri Manders	Netherlands	Helvetia-Commodore	129	
79	Jörg Müller	Switzerland	Helvetia-Commodore	94	
81	Herminio Díaz Zabala	Spain	ONCE	97	
82	Xabier Aldanondo	Spain	ONCE	116	
83	Stephen Hodge	Australia	ONCE	93	
84	Laurent Jalabert	France	ONCE	34	
85	Philippe Louviot	France	ONCE	57	
86	Miguel Martínez	Spain	ONCE	101	
87	Neil Stephens	Australia	ONCE	74	
88	Johnny Weltz	Denmark	ONCE	102	
89	Alex Zülle	Switzerland	ONCE	DNF	
91	Gert-Jan Theunisse	Netherlands	TVM–Sanyo	13	
92	Johan Capiot	Belgium	TVM–Sanyo	DNF	
93	Rob Harmeling	Netherlands	TVM–Sanyo	DNF	
94	Dimitri Konyshev	Russia	TVM–Sanyo	DNF	
95	Peter Meinert	Denmark	TVM–Sanyo	DNF	
96	Robert Millar	Great Britain	TVM–Sanyo	18	
97	Jan Siemons	Netherlands	TVM–Sanyo	DNF	
98	Jesper Skibby	Denmark	TVM–Sanyo	56	
99	Ad Wijnands	Netherlands	TVM–Sanyo	DNF	
101	Maurizio Fondriest	Italy	Panasonic–Sportlife	46	
102	Eddy Bouwmans	Netherlands	Panasonic–Sportlife	14	
103	Viatcheslav Ekimov	Russia	Panasonic–Sportlife	65	
104	Olaf Ludwig	Germany	Panasonic–Sportlife	96	
105	Wilfried Nelissen	Belgium	Panasonic–Sportlife	DNF	
106	Guy Nulens	Belgium	Panasonic–Sportlife	77	
107	Marc Sergeant	Belgium	Panasonic–Sportlife	66	
108	Eric Van Lancker	Belgium	Panasonic–Sportlife	DNF	
109	Dimitri Zhdanov	Russia	Panasonic–Sportlife	38	
111	Álvaro Mejía	Colombia	Ryalco-Postobón	DNF	
112	Alberto Camargo	Colombia	Ryalco-Postobón	DNF	
113	Arunas Cepele	Lithuania	Ryalco-Postobón	32	
114	Carlos Jaramillo	Colombia	Ryalco-Postobón	68	
115	Artūras Kasputis	Lithuania	Ryalco-Postobón	71	
116	Gerardo Moncada	Colombia	Ryalco-Postobón	54	
117	Julio César Ortegon	Colombia	Ryalco-Postobón	125	
118	William Palacio	Colombia	Ryalco-Postobón	DNF	
119	Efrain Rico	Colombia	Ryalco-Postobón	DNF	
121	Laudelino Cubino	Spain	Amaya Seguros	DNF	
122	Francisco Antequera	Spain	Amaya Seguros	109	
123	Juan Carlos Martín Martínez	Spain	Amaya Seguros	64	
124	Jesús Montoya	Spain	Amaya Seguros	69	
125	Javier Murguialday	Spain	Amaya Seguros	26	
126	Fabio Parra	Colombia	Amaya Seguros	DNF	
127	Per Pedersen	Denmark	Amaya Seguros	89	
128	Fernando Quevedo	Spain	Amaya Seguros	130	
129	Óscar de Jesús Vargas	Colombia	Amaya Seguros	24	
131	Steven Rooks	Netherlands	Buckler–Colnago–Decca	17	
132	Mario De Clercq	Belgium	Buckler–Colnago–Decca	DNF	
133	Gerrit de Vries	Netherlands	Buckler–Colnago–Decca	DNF	
134	Martin Kokkelkoren	Netherlands	Buckler–Colnago–Decca	118	
135	Frans Maassen	Netherlands	Buckler–Colnago–Decca	91	
136	Jelle Nijdam	Netherlands	Buckler–Colnago–Decca	113	
137	Noël Segers	Belgium	Buckler–Colnago–Decca	DNF	
138	Edwig Van Hooydonck	Belgium	Buckler–Colnago–Decca	DNF	
139	Eric Vanderaerden	Belgium	Buckler–Colnago–Decca	DNF	
141	Moreno Argentin	Italy	Ariostea	DNF	
142	Davide Cassani	Italy	Ariostea	DNF	
143	Bruno Cenghialta	Italy	Ariostea	DNF	
144	Roberto Conti	Italy	Ariostea	84	
145	Alberto Elli	Italy	Ariostea	28	
146	Rolf Gölz	Germany	Ariostea	DNF	
147	Rolf Järmann	Switzerland	Ariostea	62	
148	Massimiliano Lelli	Italy	Ariostea	DNF	
149	Rolf Sørensen	Denmark	Ariostea	DNF	
151	Uwe Ampler	Germany	Team Telekom	DNF	
152	Udo Bölts	Germany	Team Telekom	35	
153	Etienne De Wilde	Belgium	Team Telekom	120	
154	Bernd Gröne	Germany	Team Telekom	DNF	
155	Jens Heppner	Germany	Team Telekom	10	
156	Andreas Kappes	Germany	Team Telekom	128	
157	Marc Madiot	France	Team Telekom	70	
158	Yvon Madiot	France	Team Telekom	67	
159	Remig Stumpf	Germany	Team Telekom	DNF	
161	Federico Echave	Spain	Clas-Cajastur	DNF	
162	Fernando Escartín	Spain	Clas-Cajastur	45	
163	Francisco Espinosa	Spain	Clas-Cajastur	36	
164	Iñaki Gastón	Spain	Clas-Cajastur	DNF	
165	Arsenio González	Spain	Clas-Cajastur	20	
166	Alberto Leanizbarrutia	Spain	Clas-Cajastur	DNF	
167	Francisco Javier Mauleón	Spain	Clas-Cajastur	19	
168	Roberto Sierra	Spain	Clas-Cajastur	DNF	
169	Jon Unzaga	Spain	Clas-Cajastur	22	
171	Johan Museeuw	Belgium	Lotto–Mavic–MBK	73	
172	Peter De Clercq	Belgium	Lotto–Mavic–MBK	123	
173	Sammie Moreels	Belgium	Lotto–Mavic–MBK	100	
174	Jan Nevens	Belgium	Lotto–Mavic–MBK	51	
175	Hendrik Redant	Belgium	Lotto–Mavic–MBK	122	
176	Peter Roes	Belgium	Lotto–Mavic–MBK	121	
177	Rik Van Slycke	Belgium	Lotto–Mavic–MBK	124	
178	Patrick Verschueren	Belgium	Lotto–Mavic–MBK	DNF	
179	Marc Wauters	Belgium	Lotto–Mavic–MBK	DNF	
181	Sean Kelly	Ireland	Lotus–Festina	43	
182	Enrique Alonso	Spain	Lotus–Festina	31	
183	Acácio da Silva	Portugal	Lotus–Festina	61	
184	Mauro Gianetti	Switzerland	Lotus–Festina	DNF	
185	Ramón González Arrieta	Spain	Lotus–Festina	82	
186	Carlos Hernández Bailo	Spain	Lotus–Festina	85	
187	Luis Pérez García	Spain	Lotus–Festina	41	
188	Fernando Piñero Gallego	Spain	Lotus–Festina	60	
189	Pascal Richard	Switzerland	Lotus–Festina	DNF	
191	Franco Chioccioli	Italy	GB–MG Maglificio	16	
192	Franco Ballerini	Italy	GB–MG Maglificio	115	
193	Mario Cipollini	Italy	GB–MG Maglificio	DNF	
194	Zenon Jaskuła	Poland	GB–MG Maglificio	DNF	
195	Francis Moreau	France	GB–MG Maglificio	DNF	
196	Laurent Pillon	France	GB–MG Maglificio	88	
197	Eros Poli	Italy	GB–MG Maglificio	DNF	
198	Flavio Vanzella	Italy	GB–MG Maglificio	59	
199	Franco Vona	Italy	GB–MG Maglificio	11	
201	Luc Roosen	Belgium	Tulip	DNF	
202	Herman Frison	Belgium	Tulip	111	
203	Brian Holm	Denmark	Tulip	76	
204	Olaf Jentzsch	Germany	Tulip	DNF	
205	Søren Lilholt	Denmark	Tulip	99	
206	Allan Peiper	Australia	Tulip	126	
207	Peter Pieters	Netherlands	Tulip	DNF	
208	Jim Van De Laer	Belgium	Tulip	30	
209	Adri van der Poel	Netherlands	Tulip	DNF	
211	Erik Breukink	Netherlands	PDM–Ultima–Concorde	7	
212	Raúl Alcalá	Mexico	PDM–Ultima–Concorde	21	
213	Falk Boden	Germany	PDM–Ultima–Concorde	DNF	
214	Maarten den Bakker	Netherlands	PDM–Ultima–Concorde	92	
215	Martin Earley	Ireland	PDM–Ultima–Concorde	80	
216	Mario Kummer	Germany	PDM–Ultima–Concorde	78	
217	Harald Maier	Austria	PDM–Ultima–Concorde	50	
218	Jos van Aert	Netherlands	PDM–Ultima–Concorde	87	
219	Jean-Paul van Poppel	Netherlands	PDM–Ultima–Concorde	127	

=== By team ===
Banesto
No.	Rider	Pos.
1	Miguel Indurain (ESP)	1
2	Marino Alonso (ESP)	98
3	Jean-François Bernard (FRA)	39
4	Armand de Las Cuevas (FRA)	DNF
5	Pedro Delgado (ESP)	6
6	Aitor Garmendia (ESP)	108
7	Julián Gorospe (ESP)	47
8	Fabrice Philipot (FRA)	DNF
9	José Ramón Uriarte (ESP)	63

Gatorade–Chateau d'Ax
No.	Rider	Pos.
11	Gianni Bugno (ITA)	3
12	Andrea Chiurato (ITA)	112
13	Dirk De Wolf (BEL)	86
14	Giovanni Fidanza (ITA)	103
15	Laurent Fignon (FRA)	23
16	Abelardo Rondón (COL)	55
17	Pello Ruiz Cabestany (ESP)	72
18	Mario Scirea (ITA)	107
19	Valerio Tebaldi (ITA)	DNF

Carrera Jeans–Vagabond
No.	Rider	Pos.
21	Claudio Chiappucci (ITA)	2
22	Djamolidine Abdoujaparov (UZB)	DNF
23	Guido Bontempi (ITA)	75
24	Mario Chiesa (ITA)	117
25	Massimo Ghirotto (ITA)	40
26	Alessandro Gianelli (ITA)	DNF
27	Giancarlo Perini (ITA)	8
28	Stephen Roche (IRL)	9
29	Fabio Roscioli (ITA)	90

RMO
No.	Rider	Pos.
31	Charly Mottet (FRA)	DNF
32	Éric Caritoux (FRA)	37
33	Thierry Laurent (FRA)	79
34	Pascal Lino (FRA)	5
35	Christophe Manin (FRA)	105
36	Ronan Pensec (FRA)	52
37	Dante Rezze (FRA)	DNF
38	Richard Virenque (FRA)	25
39	Marcel Wüst (GER)	DNF

Castorama
No.	Rider	Pos.
41	Luc Leblanc (FRA)	DNF
42	Dominique Arnould (FRA)	48
43	Jean-Claude Bagot (FRA)	DNF
44	Thierry Bourguignon (FRA)	29
45	Jacky Durand (FRA)	119
46	Yvon Ledanois (FRA)	42
47	Thierry Marie (FRA)	114
48	Jean-Cyril Robin (FRA)	44
49	Gérard Rué (FRA)	15

Z
No.	Rider	Pos.
51	Greg LeMond (USA)	DNF
52	Éric Boyer (FRA)	12
53	Thierry Claveyrolat (FRA)	33
54	Jean-Claude Colotti (FRA)	95
55	Bruno Cornillet (FRA)	DNF
56	Gilbert Duclos-Lassalle (FRA)	DNF
57	Atle Kvålsvoll (NOR)	49
58	François Lemarchand (FRA)	104
59	Jérôme Simon (FRA)	27

Motorola
No.	Rider	Pos.
61	Andrew Hampsten (USA)	4
62	Phil Anderson (AUS)	81
63	Frankie Andreu (USA)	110
64	Steve Bauer (CAN)	DNF
65	Andy Bishop (USA)	DNF
66	Michel Dernies (BEL)	106
67	Ron Kiefel (USA)	DNF
68	Max Sciandri (GBR)	DNF
69	Sean Yates (GBR)	83

Helvetia-Commodore
No.	Rider	Pos.
71	Gilles Delion (FRA)	58
72	Rolf Aldag (GER)	DNF
73	Laurent Dufaux (SUI)	DNF
74	Fabian Jeker (SUI)	DNF
75	Dominik Krieger (GER)	53
76	Jean-Claude Leclercq (FRA)	DNF
77	Erich Maechler (SUI)	DNF
78	Henri Manders (NED)	129
79	Jörg Müller (SUI)	94

ONCE
No.	Rider	Pos.
81	Herminio Díaz Zabala (ESP)	97
82	Xabier Aldanondo (ESP)	116
83	Stephen Hodge (AUS)	93
84	Laurent Jalabert (FRA)	34
85	Philippe Louviot (FRA)	57
86	Miguel Martínez (ESP)	101
87	Neil Stephens (AUS)	74
88	Johnny Weltz (DEN)	102
89	Alex Zülle (SUI)	DNF

TVM–Sanyo
No.	Rider	Pos.
91	Gert-Jan Theunisse (NED)	13
92	Johan Capiot (BEL)	DNF
93	Rob Harmeling (NED)	DNF
94	Dimitri Konyshev (RUS)	DNF
95	Peter Meinert (DEN)	DNF
96	Robert Millar (GBR)	18
97	Jan Siemons (NED)	DNF
98	Jesper Skibby (DEN)	56
99	Ad Wijnands (NED)	DNF

Panasonic–Sportlife
No.	Rider	Pos.
101	Maurizio Fondriest (ITA)	46
102	Eddy Bouwmans (NED)	14
103	Viatcheslav Ekimov (RUS)	65
104	Olaf Ludwig (GER)	96
105	Wilfried Nelissen (BEL)	DNF
106	Guy Nulens (BEL)	77
107	Marc Sergeant (BEL)	66
108	Eric Van Lancker (BEL)	DNF
109	Dimitri Zhdanov (RUS)	38

Ryalco-Postobón
No.	Rider	Pos.
111	Álvaro Mejía (COL)	DNF
112	Alberto Camargo (COL)	DNF
113	Arunas Cepele (LTU)	32
114	Carlos Jaramillo (COL)	68
115	Artūras Kasputis (LTU)	71
116	Gerardo Moncada (COL)	54
117	Julio-Cesar Ortegon (COL)	125
118	William Palacio (COL)	DNF
119	Efrain Rico (COL)	DNF

Amaya Seguros
No.	Rider	Pos.
121	Laudelino Cubino (ESP)	DNF
122	Francisco Antequera (ESP)	109
123	Juan-Martin Martinez (ESP)	64
124	Jesús Montoya (ESP)	69
125	Javier Murguialday (ESP)	26
126	Fabio Parra (COL)	DNF
127	Per Pedersen (DEN)	89
128	Fernando Quevedo (ESP)	130
129	Óscar de Jesús Vargas (COL)	24

Buckler–Colnago–Decca
No.	Rider	Pos.
131	Steven Rooks (NED)	17
132	Mario De Clercq (BEL)	DNF
133	Gerrit de Vries (NED)	DNF
134	Martin Kokkelkoren (NED)	118
135	Frans Maassen (NED)	91
136	Jelle Nijdam (NED)	113
137	Noël Segers (BEL)	DNF
138	Edwig Van Hooydonck (BEL)	DNF
139	Eric Vanderaerden (BEL)	DNF

Ariostea
No.	Rider	Pos.
141	Moreno Argentin (ITA)	DNF
142	Davide Cassani (ITA)	DNF
143	Bruno Cenghialta (ITA)	DNF
144	Roberto Conti (ITA)	84
145	Alberto Elli (ITA)	28
146	Rolf Gölz (GER)	DNF
147	Rolf Järmann (SUI)	62
148	Massimiliano Lelli (ITA)	DNF
149	Rolf Sørensen (DEN)	DNF

Team Telekom
No.	Rider	Pos.
151	Uwe Ampler (GER)	DNF
152	Udo Bölts (GER)	35
153	Etienne De Wilde (BEL)	120
154	Bernd Gröne (GER)	DNF
155	Jens Heppner (GER)	10
156	Andreas Kappes (GER)	128
157	Marc Madiot (FRA)	70
158	Yvon Madiot (FRA)	67
159	Remig Stumpf (GER)	DNF

Clas-Cajastur
No.	Rider	Pos.
161	Federico Echave (ESP)	DNF
162	Fernando Escartín (ESP)	45
163	Francisco Espinosa (ESP)	36
164	Iñaki Gastón (ESP)	DNF
165	Arsenio González (ESP)	20
166	Alberto Leanizbarrutia (ESP)	DNF
167	Francisco Javier Mauleón (ESP)	19
168	Roberto Sierra (ESP)	DNF
169	Jon Unzaga (ESP)	22

Lotto–Mavic–MBK
No.	Rider	Pos.
171	Johan Museeuw (BEL)	73
172	Peter De Clercq (BEL)	123
173	Sammie Moreels (BEL)	100
174	Jan Nevens (BEL)	51
175	Hendrik Redant (BEL)	122
176	Peter Roes (BEL)	121
177	Rik Van Slycke (BEL)	124
178	Patrick Verschueren (BEL)	DNF
179	Marc Wauters (BEL)	DNF

Lotus–Festina
No.	Rider	Pos.
181	Sean Kelly (IRL)	43
182	Enrique Alonso (ESP)	31
183	Acácio da Silva (POR)	61
184	Mauro Gianetti (SUI)	DNF
185	Ramon Gonzales (ESP)	82
186	Carlos Hernández Bailo (ESP)	85
187	Luis Perez-Garcia (ESP)	41
188	Fernando Pinero (ESP)	60
189	Pascal Richard (SUI)	DNF

GB–MG Maglificio
No.	Rider	Pos.
191	Franco Chioccioli (ITA)	16
192	Franco Ballerini (ITA)	115
193	Mario Cipollini (ITA)	DNF
194	Zenon Jaskuła (POL)	DNF
195	Francis Moreau (FRA)	DNF
196	Laurent Pillon (FRA)	88
197	Eros Poli (ITA)	DNF
198	Flavio Vanzella (ITA)	59
199	Franco Vona (ITA)	11

Tulip
No.	Rider	Pos.
201	Luc Roosen (BEL)	DNF
202	Herman Frison (BEL)	111
203	Brian Holm (DEN)	76
204	Olaf Jentzsch (GER)	DNF
205	Søren Lilholt (DEN)	99
206	Allan Peiper (AUS)	126
207	Peter Pieters (NED)	DNF
208	Jim Van De Laer (BEL)	30
209	Adri van der Poel (NED)	DNF

PDM–Ultima–Concorde
No.	Rider	Pos.
211	Erik Breukink (NED)	7
212	Raúl Alcalá (MEX)	21
213	Falk Boden (GER)	DNF
214	Maarten den Bakker (NED)	92
215	Martin Earley (IRL)	80
216	Mario Kummer (GER)	78
217	Harald Maier (AUT)	50
218	Jos van Aert (NED)	87
219	Jean-Paul van Poppel (NED)	127

=== By nationality ===
Country	No. of riders	In competition	Stage wins
Australia	4	4	
Austria	1	1	
Belgium	24	14	2 (Jan Nevens, Peter De Clercq)
Canada	1	0	
Colombia	10	5	
Denmark	7	5	
France	36	36	6 (Dominique Arnould, Jean-Claude Colotti, Gilles Delion, Laurent Fignon. Laurent Jalabert, Thierry Marie)
Germany	14	8	1 (Olaf Ludwig)
Great Britain	2	2	
Republic of Ireland	3	3	1 (Stephen Roche)
Italy	26	17	3 (Guido Bontempi, Claudio Chiappucci, Franco Chioccioli)
Lithuania	2	2	
Mexico	1	1	
Netherlands	17	11	2 (Rob Harmeling, Jean-Paul van Poppel)
Norway	1	1	
Poland	1	0	
Portugal	1	1	
Russia	3	2	
Spain	30	25	4 (Miguel Indurain ×3, Javier Murguialday)
Switzerland	8	2	1 (Rolf Järmann)
United States	5	2	1 (Andrew Hampsten)
Uzbekistan	1	0	
Total	198	130	21
