= Coppa d'Oro =

Road cycling race for juniors

The Coppa d'Oro, also known as “ one lira” Race and Grand Prix of the Italian Sport Directors, is a men's one-day road cycling race reserved for junior riders (age 17-18). It takes place every September in the village of Borgo Valsugana (Trentino). The race starts in Borgo Valsugana. It follows the county road 228 and crosses the villages of Roncegno Terme, Novaledo and Levico Terme. After that, it climbs the hill of Tenna, then it goes down to Pergine Valsugana and comes back to Borgo Valsugana on the same course. At the end of the race the athletes ride the uphill from Scurelle to Telve two times, to arrive finally in the centre of Borgo Valsugana, after 81,2 km.

== History ==
The race was planned and organized for the first time in 1965 by Carlo Dalla Torre. The first three editions took place in the cities of Avio, Preore and Trento. The race established definitively in Borgo Valsugana in 1968. The editions of 1969, 1976 and 1977 didn’t take place. The final prize is presented to the Team-manager of the winning cyclist. In the past the prize was 1 lira coin but this symbolic reward has recently been replaced with cash prizes. There’s not only the cadets’ race. From 1997 there is also the Coppetta d'Oro, a race for the youngest athletes at the sport Centre of Borgo Valsugana. In 2000 it was added the Coppa Rosa, a race for female cadets that takes place the day before the Coppa d'Oro. It follows a 50 km course from Borgo Valsugana to the limit of the Veneto Region and comes back. Lastly, from 2007 the event includes all the young cycling categories from 7 to 16 years with the Coppa di Sera, a race for male and female beginners that follows an inner course in Borgo Valsugana. Up to now, the only athlete who won two editions of the Coppa d'Oro is Diego Ulissi, in 2004 and 2005.

== Coppa d'Oro's winners ==
| Anno | Vincitore | Secondo | Terzo |
|---|---|---|---|
| 1965 | (Italy) Pietro Poloni | | |
| 1966 | (Italy) Maurizio Maranzana | | |
| 1967 | (Italy) Rino Carraro | | |
| 1968 | (Italy) Paolo Giogetti | | |
| 1970 | (Italy) Walter Santeroni | | |
| 1971 | (Italy) Giovanni Zago | | |
| 1972 | (Italy) Massimo Zani | | |
| 1973 | (Italy) Carmelo Barone | | |
| 1974 | (Italy) Giuseppe Saronni | | |
| 1975 | (Italy) Stefano Ferri | | |
| 1978 | (Italy) Roberto Pagnin | | |
| 1979 | (Italy) Mauro Salvato | | |
| 1980 | (Italy) Gianni Bugno | | |
| 1981 | (Italy) Gianluca Scagliarini | | |
| 1982 | (Italy) Gianni Mosele | | |
| 1983 | (Italy) Massimo Donati | | |
| 1984 | (Italy) Stefano Giraldi | | |
| 1985 | (Italy) Franco Roat | | |
| 1986 | (Italy) Simone Biasci | | |
| 1987 | (Italy) Alessandro Bertolini | | |
| 1988 | (Italy) Gabriele Colombo | | |
| 1989 | (Italy) Federico De Beni | | |
| 1990 | (Italy) Mirco Zanobini | | |
| 1991 | (Italy) Giuseppe Palumbo | | |
| 1992 | (Italy) Giuliano Figueras | | |
| 1993 | (Italy) Ivan Basso | | |
| 1994 | (Italy) Mario Liberale | | |
| 1995 | (Italy) Antonio D'Aniello | | |
| 1996 | (Italy) Manuele Mori | | |
| 1997 | (Italy) Ivan Degasperi | | |
| 1998 | (Italy) Maurizio Flocchini | | |
| 1999 | (Italy) Antonio Mendolaro | | |
| 2000 | (Italy) Nico Sabatini | | |
| 2001 | (Italy) Dario Cataldo | | |
| 2002 | (Italy) Alberto Pizzo | | |
| 2003 | (Italy) Luca Barla | | |
| 2004 | (Italy) Diego Ulissi | | |
| 2005 | (Italy) Diego Ulissi | | |
| 2006 | (Italy) Sonny Colbrelli | | |
| 2007 | (Italy) Anthony Orsani | | |
| 2008 | (Italy) Emanuele Favero | (Italy) Alberto Bettiol | (Italy) Andrea Manfredi |
| 2009 | (Italy) Alberto Bettiol | (Italy) Simone Sterbini | (Italy) Stefano Nardelli |
| 2010 | (Italy) Federico Zurlo | (Italy) Stefano Marchesini | (Slovenia) Matej Mohorič |
| 2011 | (Slovenia) Matic Kolar Šafarič | (Italy) Andrea Di Mario | (Italy) Giacomo Tomio |
| 2012 | (Italy) Daniel Marcellusi | (Italy) Filippo Rocchetti | (Italy) Gianmarco Begnoni |
| 2013 | (Italy) Nicola Conci | (Italy) Ottavio Dotti | (Italy) Francesco Romano |
| 2014 | (Italy) Luca Mozzato | (Italy) Alessandro Covi | (Italy) Samuele Zambelli |
| 2015 | (Italy) Andrea Bagioli | (Italy) Filippo Zana | (Italy) Samuele Rubino |
| 2016 | (Italy) Samuele Rubino | (Italy) Samuele Manfredi | (Italy) Andrea Piccolo |
| 2017 | (Italy) Marco Codemo | (Italy) Giosuè Crescioli | (Italy) Giovanni Vito |
| 2018 | (Germany) Marco Brenner | (Italy) Manuel Oioli | (Italy) Elia Tovazzi |
| 2019 | (United Kingdom) Max Poole | (Italy) Ivan Valinotto | (Italy) Eros Simonetto |
| 2020 | Cancelled | | |
| 2021 | (Italy) Tommaso Alunni | (Italy) Alessandro Perracchione | (Italy) Tommaso Brunori |
| 2022 | (Italy) Ivan Toselli | (Republic of Ireland) Patrick Casey | (Italy) Filippo Cettolin |
| 2023 | (Italy) Alessio Magagnotti | (Italy) Francesco Baruzzi | (Italy) Giacomo Dentelli |
