= Fernando Piñero =

Fernando Piñero may refer to:

- Fernando Piñero (cyclist) (born 1967), Spanish cyclist
- Fernando Piñero (footballer) (born 1993), Argentine footballer
