= Alberto Camargo =

Alberto Camargo may refer to:

- Alberto Lleras Camargo (1906–1990), journalist, politician and President of Colombia
- Alberto Camargo (cyclist) (born 1967), Colombian racing cyclist
