= Giuseppe Palumbo (cyclist) =

Italian cyclist

Personal information
- Full name: Giuseppe Palumbo
- Nickname: Zagor
- Born: 10 September 1975 (age 51) Syracuse, Italy

Cycling career
- Sport: Cycling
- Discipline: Road
- Role: Rider

Amateur team
- 1996–1997: Zalf–Euromobil–Fior

Professional teams
- 1998–1999: Riso Scotti–MG Maglificio
- 2000: Amica Chips–Tacconi Sport
- 2001–2003: Bonjour
- 2004–2010: Acqua & Sapone

Major wins
- Grand Prix of Aargau Canton (2002)

Giuseppe Palumbo (born 10 September 1975) is an Italian former professional racing cyclist. Palumbo became Junior World Champion in the road race twice, in 1992 and 1993.

Palumbo rode the Giro d'Italia in 1998, 1999, 2000, 2003, 2007 and 2009, but never won a stage.

== Major results ==
1991
1st Road race, National Novice Road Championships
1st Coppa d'Oro
1992
1st Road race, UCI Junior Road World Championships
1st Coppa Città di Asti
1993
1st Road race, UCI Junior Road World Championships
1st Trofeo Buffoni
1st Stage 2 Grand Prix Rüebliland
1996
3rd Piccola Sanremo
1997
1st Stage 1 Giro della Valle d'Aosta
1998
4th Trofeo Pantalica
1999
6th Trofeo Laigueglia
3rd Giro della Provincia di Siracusa
2000
2nd Trofeo Palmanova-Calvia
6th Trofeo Soller
8th Trofeo Pantalica
2001
8th Overall Uniqa Classic
2002
1st Grand Prix of Aargau Canton
3rd Giro di Toscana
7th Coppa Sabatini
7th Grand Prix d'Ouverture La Marseillaise
10th Trofeo dell'Etna
2003
2nd Overall Giro della Liguria

1st Stage 2

3rd Gran Premio di Chiasso
4th Trofeo Pantalica
5th Giro d'Oro
6th Trofeo dell'Etna
9th G.P. Costa degli Etruschi
2004
6th Overall Settimana Ciclista Lombarda
2005
4th Giro della Provincia di Reggio Calabria
8th Overall Settimana Ciclista Lombarda
10th Overall Tour de Langkawi
10th Gran Premio Città di Misano – Adriatico
2006
2nd Giro d'Oro
2007
1st Stage 3 Tour de Wallonie
3rd Gran Premio Città di Misano – Adriatico
5th GP Industria & Artigianato di Larciano
6th Giro di Romagna
2008
3rd Gran Premio Bruno Beghelli
4th Giro del Piemonte
6th Clásica de Almería
