= Alberto Pizzo =

Italian pianist and composer

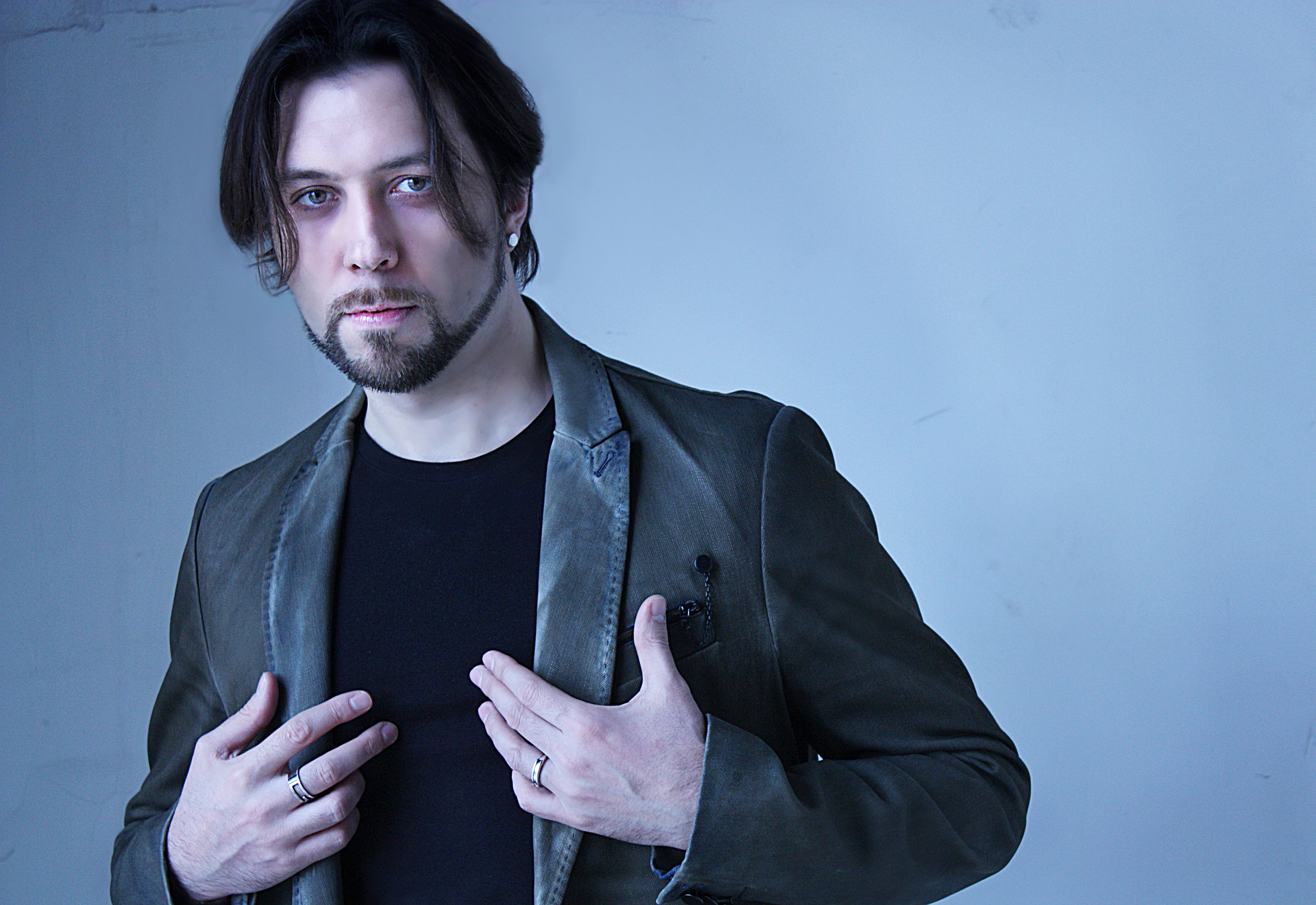
Alberto Pizzo

Alberto Pizzo (Naples, March 13, 1980) is an Italian pianist and composer.

== Biography ==
He started studying piano as a young man, and in 2004 he graduated at the San Pietro a Majella conservatoire in Naples.

He played the music for a show about Vincenzo Bellini broadcast on Rai International and in the same year he wrote and performed the music for Geo & Geo, on Rai Tre. His first album was titled Funambulist, produced by Cinevox Record.

His second album was titled On The Way and included collaborations with several artists, including Mino Cinelu, Toquinho, Renzo Arbore and David Knopfler.

In 2014 Alberto Pizzo performed with Luis Bacalov and Stefano Bollani in the concert “3 Piano Generations” and became an Official Yamaha Artist, joining Yamaha artists network. On September 4 he performed in Ravello in a piano solo concert as part of the Ravello Festival, where he had already played in 2013. In November 2014 he worked as musical director and pianist at Teatro Diana in Naples, for the show La sciantosa with Serena Autieri.

In 2015 he performed at the Festival dei due mondi in Spoleto in the concert “3 Piano Generations”, along with Luis Bacalov and Rita Marcotulli.

In November 2015 he signed with Sony Classical label, which released the album Memories, recorded at Abbey Road Studios in London, with the participation of the London Symphony Orchestra and Luis Bacalov as orchestrator and musical director.

He released the album Memories on Sony Classical, while his Japanese discographic debut came with Amore, produced by Yamaha Music Entertainment Japan. Alongside his concert activity, he has composed music for cinema and NHK productions and has appeared in television and film projects, including Watashi o kuitomete (Audience Award winner at the Tokyo International Film Festival) and the NHK drama Teruko to Rui, alongside actress Yasuko Matsuyuki. He has also composed music for auteur cinema, including Yuta Noguchi’s film Return to My Blue.

In 2017, he contributed to the soundtrack of the film A.N.I.M.A., directed by Pino Ammendola and Rosario Montesanti, composing part of the original score, including the track Passion, featured on the official soundtrack album, alongside music by the progressive rock band Premiata Forneria Marconi.

In 2023, he won the Ibra Grand Award Japan, receiving first prize in piano performance as well as the overall Grand Prix with unanimous jury approval. In 2024, he appeared in recitals and concerts at Carnegie Hall in New York, as well as in San Francisco, Naples, Sicily, and Tokyo.

He is the composer of Sky, the official theme of the Italian Pavilion at Expo Osaka 2025. In 2025, he released the album Skylight, recorded at Abbey Road Studios in London, distributed internationally and made available as exclusive content on Japan Airlines (JAL) international flights.

A pianist known for moving fluently between classical music, jazz, and original composition, he has been described by critics as a “wizard of the piano.” He is a Yamaha Europe Artist and official ambassador of the Yamaha CFX concert grand piano, the instrument he regularly uses for recordings and international performances.

== Discography ==
- Funambulist - 2012
- On the Way - 2014
- Memories - 2016
- Contact - 2021
- Skylight - 2025

== Notes ==
1. Antonio Lodetti, Lace, pianist like VIPs, ilgiornale.it, July 6, 2014.
2. The Mediterranean music according to the notes of Alberto Pizzo, ilmattino.it, October 8, 2014.
3. Lorenza Cerbini, "On The Way". Interview with Alberto Pizzo, americaoggi.info, February 23, 2014.
4. Alberto Pizzo Official becomes Yamaha Artist, it.notizie.yahoo.com, May 19, 2015.
