= Enrique Alonso =

Spanish cyclist (born 1965)

Personal information
- Born: 14 April 1965 (age 61) Mondragón, Spain

Cycling career
- Sport: Cycling
- Role: Rider

Enrique Alonso (born 14 April 1965) is a Spanish former racing cyclist. He rode in the 1992 Tour de France.
