= Juan Carlos Martín =

Spanish cyclist

Personal information
- Full name: Juan Carlos Martín Martínez
- Born: 17 February 1967 (age 59)

Cycling career
- Sport: Cycling
- Role: Rider

Juan Carlos Martín Martínez (born 17 February 1967) is a Spanish racing cyclist. He rode in the 1992 Tour de France.
