= Mauro Radaelli =

Italian cyclist

Personal information
- Born: 1 November 1967 (age 58) Caravaggio, Italy
- Height: 1.75 m (5 ft 9 in)
- Weight: 67 kg (148 lb)

Cycling career
- Sport: Cycling
- Current team: Retired
- Discipline: Road
- Role: Rider

Amateur teams
- 1986: Coalca–Morbegno
- 1989–1992: Panor–Ceramiche Pagnoncelli
- 1993: Ecoclear

Professional teams
- 1994–1996: Brescialat–Ceramiche Refin
- 1997: Aki–Safi
- 1998–2003: Vini Caldirola

Mauro Radaelli (born 1 November 1967) is an Italian former professional racing cyclist. He rode in four editions of the Tour de France, three editions of the Giro d'Italia and two editions of the Vuelta a España.

== Major results ==
1993
1st Trofeo Papà Cervi
1st Milano-Tortona
1st Stage 1a Grand Prix Guillaume Tell
3rd Circuito del Porto-Trofeo Arvedi
3rd Trofeo Zsšdi
5th Gran Premio della Liberazione
1994
1st Sprints classification, Vuelta a España
1997
1st Sprints classification, Vuelta a España
3rd Giro del Mendrisiotto
1998
1st Stage 1 Steiermark Rundfahrt
2001
2nd Sparkassen Giro Bochum
5th Giro del Piemonte
7th Coppa Bernocchi
10th Gran Premio Bruno Beghelli
2002
3rd Giro di Romagna
7th GP Industria Artigianato e Commercio Carnaghese
9th Coppa Bernocchi
9th Coppa Placci
