= Xabier Aldanondo =

Spanish cyclist (born 1967)

Personal information
- Full name: Xabier Aldanondo Luzuriaga
- Born: 6 April 1967 (age 59) Segura, Gipuzkoa, Spain
- Height: 168 cm (5 ft 6 in)
- Weight: 60 kg (132 lb)

Cycling career
- Sport: Cycling
- Discipline: Road
- Role: Rider

Professional team
- 1989–1994: ONCE

Xabier Aldanondo Luzuriaga (born 6 April 1967) is a Spanish former racing cyclist. He rode in the 1992 Tour de France and three editions of the Giro d'Italia. He competed in the team time trial at the 1988 Summer Olympics.
