= Arunas Cepele =

Lithuanian cyclist (born 1968)

Personal information
- Born: 13 May 1968 (age 58)

Cycling career
- Sport: Cycling
- Role: Rider

Arunas Cepele (born 13 May 1968) is a Lithuanian racing cyclist. He rode in the 1992 Tour de France, for the Colombian Postóbon team, which was awarded a wildcard entry. He finished behind Eddy Bouwmans and Richard Virenque in the best young rider classification and placed 32nd overall, just ahead of Thierry Claveyrolat and Laurent Jalabert. He also rode the Vuelta a single time, in 1994, where he had the best stage finish of his career finishing 3rd on the stage to Lagos de Covadonga.
