= José Manuel Uría =

Spanish cyclist

Personal information
- Full name: José Manuel Uría González
- Born: 1 December 1969 (age 56) Gijón, Spain

Cycling career
- Sport: Cycling
- Current team: Retired
- Discipline: Road
- Role: Rider

Professional teams
- 1992–1993: CLAS–Cajastur
- 1994–1997: Deportpublic
- 1998: Ros Mary–Amica Chips
- 1999: Kelme–Costa Blanca
- 2000: Team Polti

José Manuel Uría González (born 1 December 1969) is a Spanish former cyclist.

== Major results ==
1994
1st Subida al Naranco
1995
3rd Subida al Naranco
1997
1st Overall Vuelta a los Valles Mineros

1st Stage 1

2nd Clásica a los Puertos de Guadarrama
10th Overall Escalada a Montjuich

=== Grand Tour general classification results timeline ===
Grand Tour	1994	1995	1996	1997	1998	1999	2000
Giro d'Italia	—	DNF	74	—	DNF	DNF	43
Tour de France	—	—	—	—	—	—	—
Vuelta a España	DNF	15	—	14	—	13	47

Legend
—	Did not compete
DNF	Did not finish
