= Fernando Piñero (cyclist) =

Spanish cyclist

Personal information
- Full name: Fernando Piñero Gallego
- Born: 22 February 1967 (age 59)

Cycling career
- Sport: Cycling
- Role: Rider

Fernando Piñero Gallego (born 22 February 1967) is a Spanish racing cyclist. He rode in the 1992 Tour de France.
