= Stephen Hodge (cyclist) =

Australian cyclist (born 1961)

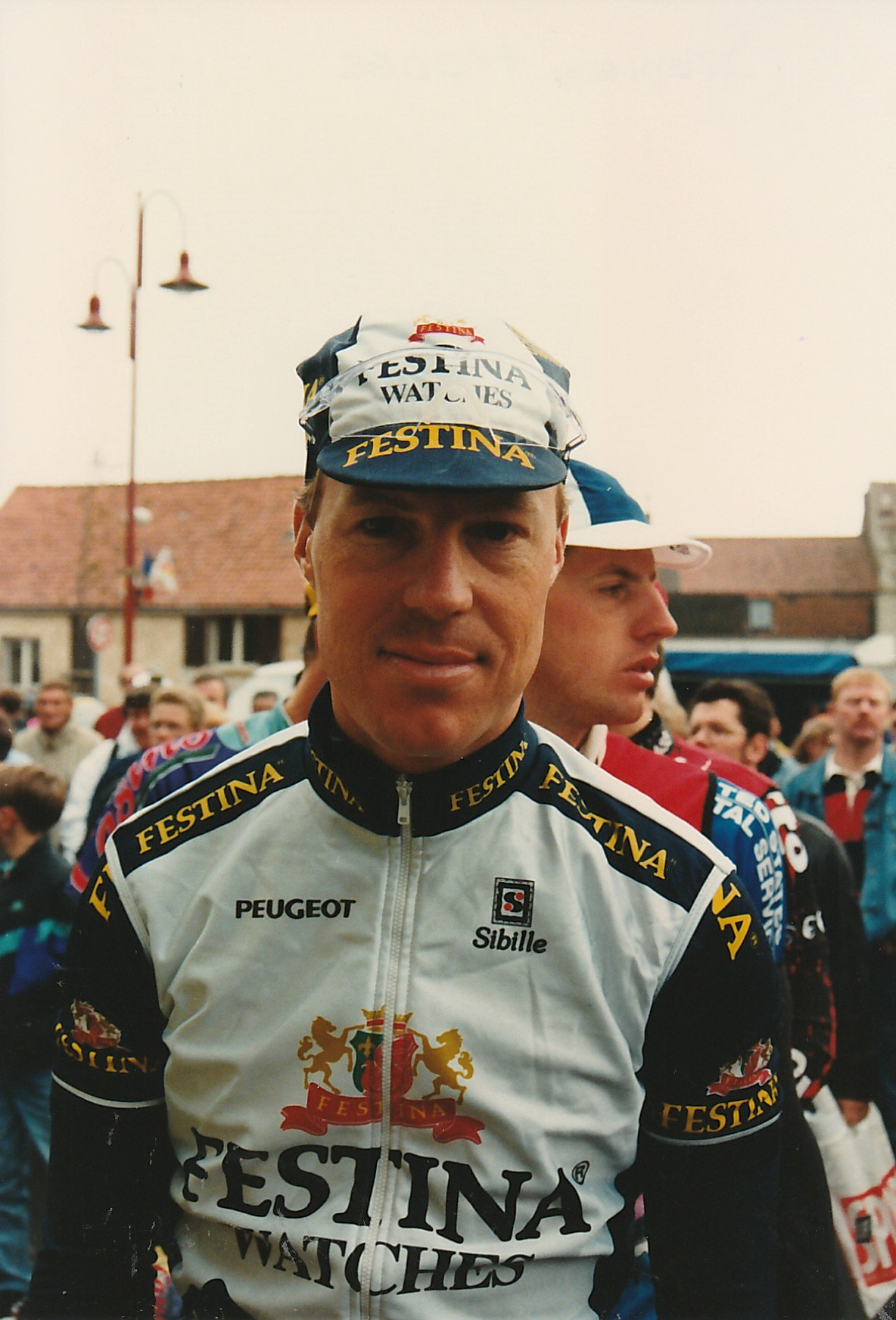

Personal information
- Full name: Stephen Hodge
- Born: 18 July 1961 (age 65) Adelaide, Australia
- Height: 1.85 m (6 ft 1 in)
- Weight: 74 kg (163 lb)

Cycling career
- Sport: Cycling
- Current team: Retired
- Role: Rider

Professional teams
- 1987–1988: Kas
- 1989: Caja Rural
- 1990–1993: ONCE
- 1994–1996: Festina–Lotus

Stephen Hodge (born 18 July 1961) is an Australian former cyclist. He was a professional between 1987 and 1996. Hodge rode 14 Grand Tours in his career managing to finish every one he started.

== Biography ==
After retirement, he became Vice President of Cycling Australia. Hodge was a founding member and a board member of the Amy Gillett Foundation. Hodge is now a cycling ambassador and works for We Ride Australia, a campaign to increase cycling and reduce carbon output.

== Doping ==
In 2012, in wake of the Lance Armstrong doping allegations he admitted that he doped during his professional career, and stepped down from his position with Cycling Australia.

== Major results ==
1985
3rd Overall GP Tell
6th Grand Prix des Nations
1986
2nd GP Lugano
6th Commonwealth Games
1987
2nd GP Villafranca de Ordizia
2nd Clásica de Sabiñánigo
1988
1st Grand Prix Impanis-Van Petegem
9th Overall Tour du Limousin
1989
2nd Overall Herald Sun Tour

1st Stage 11

4th Overall Étoile de Bessèges
7th Grand Prix de la Libération (TTT)
1990
1st Clásica a los Puertos
5th Overall Tour de Romandie
1991
3rd Overall Giro del Trentino
4th Overall Tour de Romandie

1st Stage 3

4th Overall Étoile de Bessèges
6th Overall Volta a Catalunya
6th Milano–Torino
7th Subida a Urkiola
8th Road race, UCI Road World Championships
8th Grand Prix des Nations
9th Tour du Nord-Ouest
1992
1st Stage 1 Critérium International
3rd Giro dell'Emilia
10th Giro di Lombardia
1993
2nd Grand Prix des Nations
1994
1st Stage 13 Herald Sun Tour
9th Grand Prix des Nations
1995
8th Overall Volta a Catalunya
1996
1st Stage 5b Troféu Joaquim Agostinho
2nd Overall Herald Sun Tour

1st Stages 7 & 10a

9th Overall Tour Méditerranéen

=== Grand Tour general classification results timeline ===
| Grand Tour | 1989 | 1990 | 1991 | 1992 | 1993 | 1994 | 1995 | 1996 |
|---|---|---|---|---|---|---|---|---|
| Vuelta a España | — | — | — | 26 | 85 | 31 | — | 76 |
| Giro d'Italia | — | 19 | 26 | — | — | — | 85 | 76 |
| Tour de France | 83 | 34 | 67 | 93 | — | 83 | 64 | — |

Legend
| — | Did not participate |
| DNF | Did not finish |
