= Luboš Lom =

Czech cyclist (1965–2022)

Personal information
- Born: 3 February 1965 Kladno, Czechoslovakia
- Died: 26 February 2022 (aged 57)

Cycling career
- Sport: Cycling

Luboš Lom (3 February 1965 – 26 February 2022) was a Czech cyclist. He competed in two events at the 1988 Summer Olympics.

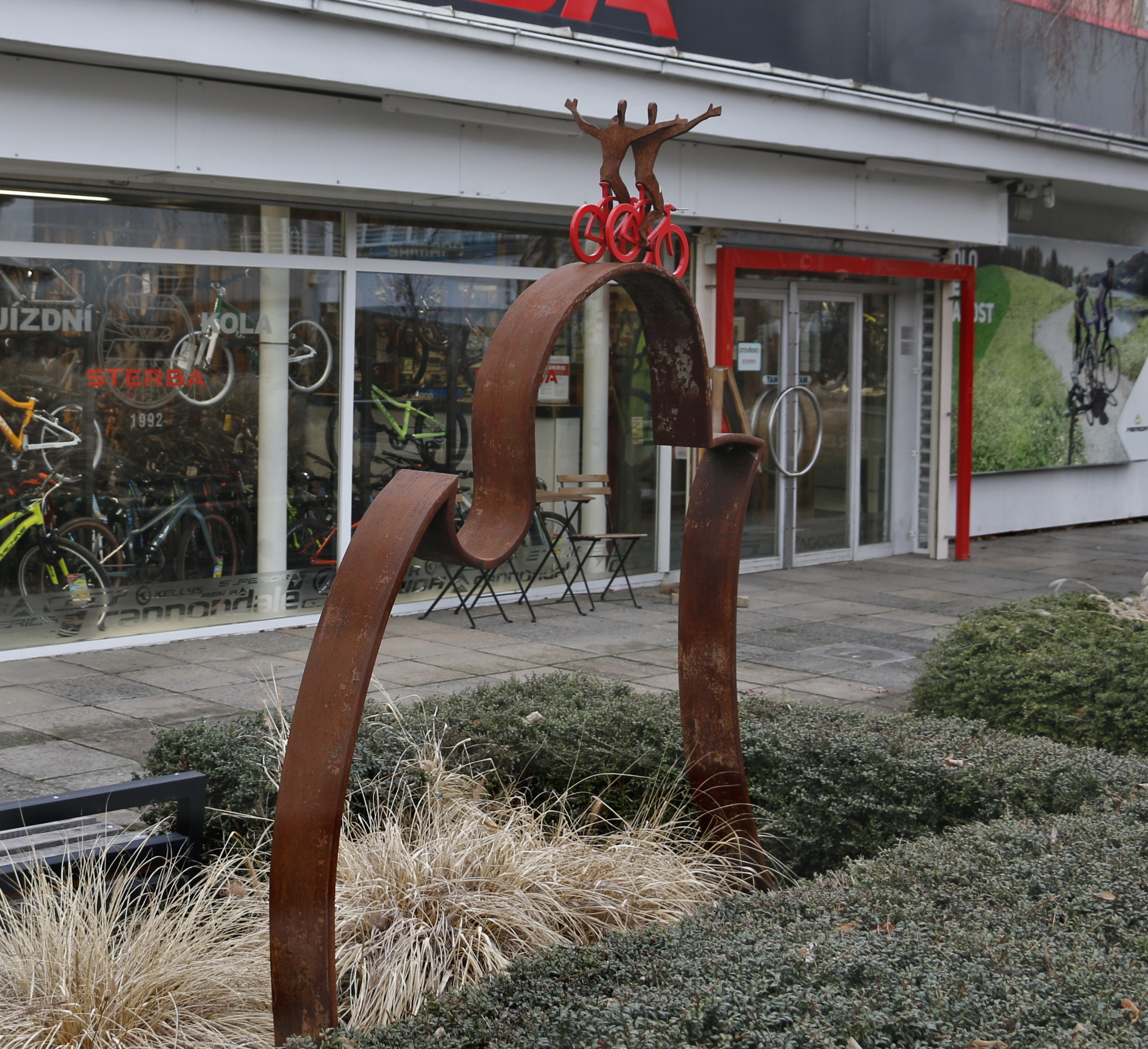
Luboš Lom Memorial in Prague
