= Simone Biasci =

Italian cyclist

Personal information
- Born: 6 April 1970 (age 56) Pontedera, Italy

Cycling career
- Sport: Cycling
- Current team: Retired
- Discipline: Road
- Role: Rider

Professional teams
- 1992–1995: Mercatone Uno–Medeghini–Zucchini
- 1996: Saeco–AS Juvenes San Marino
- 1997: Kross–Montanari–Selle Italia

Simone Biasci (born 6 April 1970 in Pontedera) is an Italian former professional cyclist.

== Major results ==
1986
1st Coppa d'Oro
1988
1st Junior National Road Race Championships
1990
1st Gran Premio Industria e Commercio Artigianato Carnaghese
1st Gara Ciclistica Montappone
1st Targa Crocifisso
3rd Giro del Casentino
1991
1st Stage 2 Peace Race
3rd Gran Premio della Liberazione
1992
3rd Coppa Sabatini
3rd Criterium d'Abruzzo
1994
1st Stage 7 Vuelta a España
1st Stages 2 & 3 Volta a Catalunya
1996
1st Stage 2 Euskal Bizikleta
1st Stage 6 Vuelta a Asturias
2nd Overall Clásica Internacional de Alcobendas
1997
1st Stage 4 Vuelta a Mexico
2003
1st Stage 13 Vuelta a Cuba
2004
3rd Overall Tour de Tunisie

1st Stage 9

2005
1st Stage 13 Vuelta a Cuba
2006
1st Stage 3 Vuelta a Cuba

=== Grand Tour general classification results timeline ===
| Grand Tour | 1994 | 1995 | 1996 | 1997 |
|---|---|---|---|---|
| Giro d'Italia | — | — | — | DNF |
| Tour de France | — | — | 126 | — |
| Vuelta a España | DNF | — | — | — |

Legend
| — | Did not compete |
| DNF | Did not finish |
