= Vicente Aparicio =

Spanish cyclist (born 1969)

Personal information
- Full name: Vicente Aparicio Vila
- Born: September 14, 1969 (age 57) Pinedo, Spain

Cycling career
- Sport: Cycling
- Current team: Retired
- Discipline: Road
- Role: Rider

Professional teams
- 1990-1993: Amaya Seguros
- 1994-1997: Banesto
- 1998: Vitalicio Seguros

Vicente Aparicio Vila (born September 14, 1969 in Pinedo) is a former Spanish cyclist.

== Palmarès ==
1989
1st Volta a Lleida
1994
6th Paris–Nice
7th Vuelta a España
1995
3rd Spanish National Road Race Championships
3rd Critérium du Dauphiné Libéré

== Grand Tour results ==
=== Tour de France ===
- 1994: 67th
- 1995: 21st
- 1996: DNF

=== Vuelta a España ===
- 1993: 34th
- 1994: 7th
- 1995: DNF
- 1996: DNF

=== Giro d'Italia ===
- 1998: 59th
