= Oleg Petrovich Chuzhda =

Ukrainian cyclist (born 1963)

Personal information
- Born: July 23, 1963 (age 63) Kiev, Ukraine

Cycling career
- Sport: Cycling
- Current team: Retired
- Discipline: Road
- Role: Rider

Professional teams
- 1990: Alfa Lum
- 1991–1992: Seur–Otero

Oleg Petrovich Chuzhda or Czougeda (Олег Чужда), (Note: Transcriptions of the surname from Cyrillic into Latin characters have varied. The current standard English spelling of the surname is Chuzhda. However, in English press reports and record books during his career, his name was frequently spelled Czougeda or Tchugeda. Spelled "Tschushda" sites in German, or Tchougeda and Tschuchda in French) born July 23, 1963, in Kiev, Ukraine, (then part of the USSR) is a former Soviet/Ukrainian cyclist. After a distinguished amateur career, he turned professional in 1990. He is the father of Ukrainian professional cyclist Oleg Chuzhda, Jr., who has been racing since 2005.

== Career ==
In 1981, he finished second in the junior world championship. The following year he was a member of the Soviet team competing in the team time trial in the UCI World Championships. The team came third at the 1982 championships and first in 1983. Chuzhda also won the 1984 Milk Race.

== Major results ==
1981
1st Overall Giro della Lunigiana
2nd World Championship Road Junior
1982
3rd Overall Milk Race. (Note: In Milk Race 1982, a triple Soviet victory 1st Yuri Kashirin - 2nd Oleg Logvin - 3rd Oleg Chuzhda)

1st Stage 2
1st Team classification (USSR cycling team)

3rd World Championship men's team time trial (USSR national team)
1983
World Championship team 100 km men's team time trial (USSR cycling team) (Yuri Kashirin, Sergei Navolokin, Alexandre Zinoviev)
2nd Peace Race
3rd Tour de Bretagne Cycliste
5th Circuit de la Sarthe
1984
1st Milk Race

1st stages 3, 5, 10, and 12
1st team classification (USSR cycling team)

1985
1st stage 7 Milk Race
1986
1st Tour of Sochi
1992
2nd Volta ao Alentejo

== Distinction ==
1983: Master Emeritus sports (cycling) of the Soviet Union
