= Antonio Fanelli =

Italian road cyclist (born 1966)

Personal information
- Full name: Paolo Antonio Fanelli
- Born: 29 May 1966 (age 60) Bari, Italy

Cycling career
- Sport: Cycling
- Current team: Retired
- Disciplines: Road; Track
- Role: Rider

Professional teams
- 1989: Polli–Mobiexport
- 1990: Selle Italia–Eurocar
- 1991: ZG Mobili–Bottecchia
- 1992–1993: Jolly Componibili–Club 88
- 1994–1995: Amore & Vita–Galatron
- 1996: Glacial–Selle Italia

Antonio Fanelli (born 29 May 1966) is an Italian former professional road cyclist. His brother Ivan also competed as a professional cyclist.

== Major results ==
1984
1st Road race, National Junior Road Championships
1986
1st Road race, National Amateur Road Championships
1st Trofeo Salvatore Morucci
2nd Giro del Casentino
1987
4th Gran Premio della Liberazione
1989
2nd Coppa Sabatini
5th GP Industria & Artigianato
1990
3rd Giro dell'Appennino
3rd Giro di Campania
1991
3rd Giro di Romagna
1993
1st National Motor-paced Championships
1995
3rd UCI Motor-paced World Championships
5th GP Industria & Artigianato
