= Mikel Zarrabeitia (cyclist) =

Spanish cyclist (born 1970)

Personal information
- Full name: Mikel Zarrabeitia Uranga
- Born: May 14, 1970 (age 56) Abadiño, Basque Country, Spain
- Height: 1.79 m (5 ft 10 1/2 in)
- Weight: 63 kg (139 lb; 9 st 13 lb)

Cycling career
- Sport: Cycling
- Current team: Retired
- Discipline: Road
- Role: Rider

Professional teams
- 1991–1993: Amaya Seguros
- 1994–1995: Banesto
- 1996–2003: ONCE

Major wins
- Euskal Bizikleta (2002)

Mikel Zarrabeitia Uranga (born May 14, 1970, in Abadiño) is a Spanish former road bicycle racer.

In the 11th stage of the 2000 Vuelta a España, Zarrabeitia cut off the top of his finger. He was trying to repair his distance counter during the descent from Alt de la Rabassa when the accident happened.

== Major results ==
1991
3rd GP Villafranca de Ordizia
5th Overall Euskal Bizikleta
1992
1st Overall Vuelta a La Rioja

1st Stage 2

2nd Klasika Primavera
3rd Overall Tour of the Basque Country
7th Overall Volta a Catalunya
7th Overall Vuelta a Aragón
10th Overall Euskal Bizikleta
1993
8th Subida al Naranco
9th Overall Volta a Catalunya
1994
2nd Overall Vuelta a España
1996
4th Subida al Naranco
5th Overall Euskal Bizikleta
1997
1st Gran Premio Navarra
1st Klasika Primavera
2nd Overall Vuelta a Aragón

1st Stage 3

3rd Overall Volta a Catalunya
5th Tour du Haut Var
6th Overall Tour of the Basque Country
7th Overall Paris–Nice
7th Subida a Urkiola
9th Overall Critérium du Dauphiné Libéré
1998
4th Overall Vuelta a La Rioja
4th Overall Setmana Catalana de Ciclisme
5th Overall Volta a la Comunitat Valenciana
5th Subida al Naranco
7th Overall Paris–Nice
7th Overall Tour of the Basque Country
7th Overall Euskal Bizikleta
1999
5th Overall Vuelta a Murcia
6th Overall Critérium International
9th Overall Tour de Suisse
9th Züri-Metzgete
9th GP Villafranca de Ordizia
2000
4th Overall Euskal Bizikleta
6th Overall Vuelta a La Rioja
10th Overall Tour of Galicia
2001
3rd Overall Vuelta a Murcia
4th Overall Euskal Bizikleta

1st Stage 1

7th GP Miguel Induráin
8th Overall Volta ao Algarve
2002
1st Overall Euskal Bizikleta

1st Stage 4b

1st Prueba Villafranca de Ordizia
3rd Overall Vuelta a Burgos
4th Overall Volta a Catalunya
8th Overall Vuelta a Andalucía
10th Subida al Naranco
2003
2nd Overall Paris–Nice
9th Overall Vuelta a Andalucía

=== Grand Tour general classification results timeline ===
Grand Tour	1993	1994	1995	1996	1997	1998	1999	2000	2001	2002
Giro d'Italia	—	—	—	—	—	—	29	—	—	—
Tour de France	—	—	—	—	DNF	—	—	—	—	—
Vuelta a España	12	2	—	31	40	36	11	DNF	25	21
