= Luis Pérez García =

Spanish cyclist

Personal information
- Born: 23 July 1966 (age 60)

Cycling career
- Sport: Cycling
- Role: Rider

Luis Pérez García (born 23 July 1966) is a Spanish racing cyclist. He rode in the 1992 Tour de France.
