= 1994 Vuelta a España =

Race details
- Dates: 25 April - 15 May
- Stages: 20 + Prologue
- Distance: 3,531.6 km (2,194 mi)
- Winning time: 92h 07' 48"

Results
Jersey awarded to the overall winner	Winner	Tony Rominger (SUI)	(Mapei–CLAS)
	Second	Mikel Zarrabeitia (ESP)	(Banesto)
	Third	Pedro Delgado (ESP)	(Banesto)
Jersey awarded to the points classification winner	Points	Laurent Jalabert (FRA)	(ONCE)
Jersey awarded to the mountains classification winner	Mountains	Luc Leblanc (FRA)	(Festina–Lotus)
Jersey awarded to the sprints classification winner	Sprints	Mauro Radaelli (ITA)	(Brescialat–Ceramiche Refin)
	Team	Banesto	

The 1994 Vuelta a España was the 49th Edition of the Vuelta a España, one of cycling's Grand Tours. The Vuelta started on April 25 with a short 9 km (5.6 mi) prologue around the Spanish city of Valladolid. The race came to a close on May 15 with a flat stage that stretched from Palazuelos de Eresma to the Spanish capital of Madrid. Seventeen teams entered the race, which was won by Tony Rominger of the Mapei–CLAS team. Second and third respectively were the Spanish riders Mikel Zarrabeitia and Pedro Delgado.

Tony Rominger became the first rider to win the Vuelta a España three consecutive times. Amongst the race's other classifications, Laurent Jalabert of the ONCE team won the points classification, Festina–Lotus rider Luc Leblanc won the mountains classification, Mauro Radaelli of the Brescialat team won the intermediate sprints classification, and Amore & Vita rider Alessio Di Basco won the special sprints classification. Banesto finished as the winners of the team classification, which ranked each of the twenty teams contesting the race by lowest cumulative time.

== Race preview and favorites ==
Tony Rominger, winner of the past two editions, was once again the favorite. Alex Zülle the previous year's runner up and Pedro Delgado, twice winner of the Vuelta, were expected to be his main rivals.

== Teams ==
A total of 17 teams were invited to participate in the 1994 Vuelta a España. Each team sent a squad of ten riders, so the Vuelta began with a peloton of 170 cyclists. Out of the 170 riders that started this edition of the Vuelta a España, a total of 121 riders made it to the finish in Madrid.

The 17 teams that took part in the race were:

- Amore & Vita
- Artiach-Royal Fruco
- Banesto
- Brescialat
- Cavas Castellblanch
- Euskadi–Petronor
- Festina–Lotus
- Jolly-Cage
- Kelme–Avianca–Gios
- Mapei–CLAS
- Mercatone Uno–Medeghini
- Navigare–Blue Storm
- ONCE
- Recer-Boavista
- Santa Clara-Samara
- Sicasal-Acral
- TVM–Bison Kit

== Route and stages ==
The 1994 Vuelta a España began with a brief 9 km (6 mi) individual time trial that circuited the city of Valladolid. The official race route contained three individual time trial events with distances that ranged from 9 km (6 mi) to 53 km (33 mi) in length. There were a total of eight stages that held many high mountains, while there was only one hilly stage that contained climbs of lesser degree. The nine remaining stages were primarily flat.

Of the stages that contained mountains, six contained summit finishes: stage 6 to Sierra Nevada, stage 10 to Andorra-Arcalís, stage 11 to Cerler, stage 14 to Sierra de la Demanda, stage 16 to Lakes of Covadonga, and stage 17 to Monte Naranco.

Stage	Date	Course	Distance	Type	Winner
1	25 April	Valladolid	9 km (6 mi)	Individual time trial	Tony Rominger (SUI)
2	26 April	Valladolid to Salamanca	178.4 km (111 mi)	Plain stage	Laurent Jalabert (FRA)
3	27 April	Salamanca to Cáceres	239 km (149 mi)	Plain stage	Laurent Jalabert (FRA)
4	28 April	Almendralejo to Córdoba	235.6 km (146 mi)	Plain stage	Endrio Leoni (ITA)
5	29 April	Córdoba to Granada	166.9 km (104 mi)	Plain stage	Laurent Jalabert (FRA)
6	30 April	Granada to Sierra Nevada	151.7 km (94 mi)	Stage with mountain(s)	Tony Rominger (SUI)
7	1 May	Baza to Alicante	256.5 km (159 mi)	Plain stage	Simone Biasci (ITA)
8	2 May	Benidorm to Benidorm	39.5 km (25 mi)	Individual time trial	Tony Rominger (SUI)
9	3 May	Benidorm to Valencia	166 km (103 mi)	Plain stage	Jean-Paul van Poppel (NED)
10	4 May	Igualada to Andorra-Arcalís (Andorra)	205 km (127 mi)	Stage with mountain(s)	Ángel Camargo (COL)
11	5 May	Andorra la Vella (Andorra) to Cerler	195.3 km (121 mi)	Stage with mountain(s)	Tony Rominger (SUI)
12	6 May	Benasque to Zaragoza	226.7 km (141 mi)	Plain stage	Laurent Jalabert (FRA)
13	7 May	Zaragoza to Pamplona	201.6 km (125 mi)	Plain stage	Laurent Jalabert (FRA)
14	8 May	Pamplona to Sierra de la Demanda	174 km (108 mi)	Stage with mountain(s)	Tony Rominger (SUI)
15	9 May	Santo Domingo de la Calzada to Santander	209.3 km (130 mi)	Hilly stage	Alessio Di Basco (ITA)
16	10 May	Santander to Lakes of Covadonga	147.7 km (92 mi)	Stage with mountain(s)	Laurent Jalabert (FRA)
17	11 May	Cangas de Onís to Monte Naranco	150.4 km (93 mi)	Stage with mountain(s)	Bart Voskamp (NED)
18	12 May	Ávila to Ávila	189 km (117 mi)	Stage with mountain(s)	Giuseppe Calcaterra (ITA)
19	13 May	Ávila to Palazuelos de Eresma	171 km (106 mi)	Stage with mountain(s)	Marino Alonso (ESP)
20	14 May	Segovia to Palazuelos de Eresma	53 km (33 mi)	Individual time trial	Tony Rominger (SUI)
21	15 May	Palazuelos de Eresma to Madrid	165.7 km (103 mi)	Plain stage	Laurent Jalabert (FRA)
	Total		3,531 km (2,194 mi)		

== Race overview ==
Rominger showed from the very start that he was unlikely to be easily beaten, as he won the prologue by a large margin. On the sixth stage, ending at the top of the 2700m climb of the Sierra Nevada, Rominger took advantage of an attack by youngster Mikel Zarrabeitia to leave all other riders behind and win the stage. After only one mountain stage Rominger was now the leader by over two minutes over his rivals.

In the second week, Rominger put his overall win beyond doubt, gaining another two minutes on his rivals at the Benidorm individual time trial and taking two more stage wins, albeit without much time gain, on the mountaintop finishes at Cerler and the Alto de la Cruz de la Demanda.

Even though the overall winner was set in stone, there was a spirited fight for second and third places between ONCE leader Zülle and Banesto riders Delgado and Zarrabeitia. This fight was mostly decided when Zülle cracked on the Lagos de Covadonga climb and lost several minutes. This very stage marked the beginning of Laurent Jalabert's transformation from sprinter into GC contender as he took the stage win.

In Segovia, on the outskirts of Madrid, Marino Alonso took the only stage win by a Spanish rider in this edition of the Vuelta. It was also in Segovia that the penultima stage was held, a 53 km individual time trial. Zülle set the fastest intermediate times and looked set to win the stage and finish on the podium, but bad luck struck, and after four consecutive mechanical issues he lost any chance of doing so. Rominger took his 6th stage win.

The final stage, ending in Madrid, resulted in Jalabert's seventh stage win, a record that also netted him the points classification. Also a record was Rominger's third Vuelta win. He also held the leader's jersey from start to finish (which only three riders had achieved before) and won six stages. The Banesto duo of Zarrabeitia and Delgado accompanied him on the podium.

It was the last time that the race was held in late spring as from 1995 onwards the race was held in September.

== Classification leadership ==
Classification leadership by stage
Stage	Winner	General classification	Points classification	Mountains classification	Team classification
P	Tony Rominger	Tony Rominger	Tony Rominger	not awarded	Banesto
1	Laurent Jalabert	Tony Rominger	Tony Rominger	not awarded	Banesto
2	Laurent Jalabert	Tony Rominger	Laurent Jalabert	José Manuel Uría	Banesto
3	Endrio Leoni	Tony Rominger	Laurent Jalabert	Ignacio García Camacho	Banesto
4	Laurent Jalabert	Tony Rominger	Laurent Jalabert	Luc Leblanc	Banesto
5	Tony Rominger	Tony Rominger	Laurent Jalabert	Luc Leblanc	Mapei–CLAS
6	Simone Biasci	Tony Rominger	Laurent Jalabert	Luc Leblanc	Mapei–CLAS
7	Tony Rominger	Tony Rominger	Laurent Jalabert	Tony Rominger	Mapei–CLAS
8	Jean-Paul van Poppel	Tony Rominger	Laurent Jalabert	Luc Leblanc	Banesto
9	Ángel Camargo	Tony Rominger	Laurent Jalabert	Tony Rominger	Banesto
10	Tony Rominger	Tony Rominger	Tony Rominger	Tony Rominger	Mapei–CLAS
11	Laurent Jalabert	Tony Rominger	Laurent Jalabert	Tony Rominger	Mapei–CLAS
12	Laurent Jalabert	Tony Rominger	Laurent Jalabert	Tony Rominger	Mapei–CLAS
13	Tony Rominger	Tony Rominger	Laurent Jalabert	Tony Rominger	Mapei–CLAS
14	Alessio Di Basco	Tony Rominger	Laurent Jalabert	Tony Rominger	Banesto
15	Laurent Jalabert	Tony Rominger	Laurent Jalabert	Tony Rominger	Banesto
16	Bart Voskamp	Tony Rominger	Laurent Jalabert	Tony Rominger	Banesto
17	Giuseppe Calcaterra	Tony Rominger	Laurent Jalabert	Luc Leblanc	Banesto
18	Marino Alonso	Tony Rominger	Laurent Jalabert	Luc Leblanc	Banesto
19	Tony Rominger	Tony Rominger	Tony Rominger	Luc Leblanc	Banesto
20	Laurent Jalabert	Tony Rominger	Laurent Jalabert	Luc Leblanc	Banesto
Final		Tony Rominger	Laurent Jalabert	Luc Leblanc	Banesto

== Final standings ==
Legend
Yellow jersey	Denotes the winner of the General classification	Granate jersey	Denotes the winner of the Points classification
White jersey	Denotes the winner of the Mountains classification	Red jersey	Denotes the winner of the Intermediate sprints classification
Orangejersey	Denotes the winner of the Special sprints classification		

=== General classification ===
	Rider	Team	Time
1	Tony Rominger (SUI)	Mapei–CLAS	92h 07' 48"
2	Mikel Zarrabeitia (ESP)	Banesto	+ 7' 28"
3	Pedro Delgado (ESP)	Banesto	+ 9' 27"
4	Alex Zülle (SUI)	ONCE	+ 10' 54"
5	Oliverio Rincón (COL)	ONCE	+ 13' 09"
6	Luc Leblanc (FRA)	Festina–Lotus	+ 15' 27"
7	Vicente Aparicio (ESP)	Banesto	+ 15' 48"
8	Luis Pérez (ESP)	Cavas Castellblanch	+ 16' 46"
9	Fernando Escartín (ESP)	Mapei–CLAS	+ 16' 54"
10	Alberto Camargo (COL)	Artiach-Royal Fruco	+ 20' 35"

=== Points classification ===
	Rider	Team	Points
1	Laurent Jalabert (FRA)	ONCE	243
2	Tony Rominger (SUI)	Mapei–CLAS	227
3	Alex Zülle (SUI)	ONCE	121
4	Mikel Zarrabeitia (ESP)	Banesto	117
5	Pedro Delgado (ESP)	Banesto	89
6	Juan Carlos González Salvador (ESP)	Carrera Jeans–Tassoni	83
7	Oliverio Rincón (COL)	ONCE	78
8	Jean-Paul van Poppel (NED)	Festina–Lotus	77
9	Roberto Pagnin (ITA)	Navigare–Blue Storm	67
10	Paulo-Antonio Fanelli (ITA)	Carrera Jeans–Tassoni	64

=== Mountains classification ===
	Rider	Team	Points
1	Luc Leblanc (FRA)	Festina–Lotus	158
2	Michele Coppolillo (ITA)	Navigare–Blue Storm	148
3	Tony Rominger (SUI)	Mapei–CLAS	136
4	Oliverio Rincón (COL)	ONCE	99
5	Mikel Zarrabeitia (ESP)	Banesto	76

=== Team classification ===
	Team	Time
1	Banesto	276h 42' 43"
2	Mapei–CLAS	+ 10' 01"
3	ONCE	+ 18' 15"
4	Cavas Castellblanch	+ 40' 55"
5	Festina–Lotus	+ 43' 32"
6	Artiach-Royal Fruco	+ 48' 18"
7	Kelme–Avianca–Gios	+ 54' 52"
8	Euskadi–Petronor	+ 1h 40' 24"
9	Mercatone Uno–Medeghini	+ 1h 51' 54"
10	Recer-Boavista	+ 2h 30' 44"

=== Intermediate sprints classification ===
	Rider	Team	Points
1	Mauro Radaelli (ITA)	Brescialat	44
2	Orlando Rodrigues (POR)	Artiach-Royal Fruco	29
3	Roberto Pagnin (ITA)	Navigare–Blue Storm	22
4	Fabio Roscioli (ITA)	Brescialat	8
5	Julio Cesar Cadena (COL)	Kelme–Avianca–Gios	7

=== Special sprints classification ===
	Rider	Team	Points
1	Alessio Di Basco (ITA)	Amore & Vita	39
2	Giuseppe Calcaterra (ITA)	Amore & Vita	18
3	Fabio Roscioli (ITA)	Brescialat	11
4	Michele Coppolillo (ITA)	Navigare–Blue Storm	11
5	Roberto Pagnin (ITA)	Navigare–Blue Storm	6
