= Alberto Camargo (cyclist) =

Colombian cyclist

Personal information
- Full name: Luis Alberto Camargo González
- Born: 3 February 1965 (age 61) Duitama, Colombia

Cycling career
- Sport: Cycling
- Current team: Retired
- Discipline: Road
- Role: Rider

Professional teams
- 1987–1988: Postobón–Manzana
- 1989–1990: Café de Colombia
- 1991–1992: Postobón–Manzana–Ryalcao
- 1993–1994: Artiach–Filipinos–Chiquilin
- 1995–1996: Postobón–Manzana

Alberto Camargo (born 3 February 1965) is a Colombian former racing cyclist. He rode in nine Grand Tours between 1987 and 1994.

== Major results ==
1987
7th Overall Vuelta a Colombia
1988
8th Overall Vuelta a Colombia
1989
1st Stage 21 Vuelta a España
6th Overall Clásico RCN

1st Prologue

8th Overall Volta a Catalunya
10th Overall Critérium du Dauphiné Libéré
1990
1st Stage 12 Vuelta a España
1992
1st Overall Vuelta a los Valles Mineros

1st Stage 2

1st Stage 6 Clásico RCN
5th Overall Critérium du Dauphiné Libéré
9th Overall Euskal Bizikleta
1994
1st Stage 5 Vuelta a Asturias
10th Overall Vuelta a España
10th Overall Vuelta a Murcia

=== Grand Tour general classification results timeline ===
Grand Tour	1987	1988	1989	1990	1991	1992	1993	1994
Giro d'Italia	—	—	—	—	—	—	—	—
Tour de France	DNF	—	20	—	18	DNF	—	—
Vuelta a España	—	—	51	22	—	13	DNF	10
