= List of teams and cyclists in the 1993 Tour de France =

List of cyclists

There were 20 teams in the 1993 Tour de France, each composed of 9 cyclists. The first 14 teams were selected in May 1993, based on the FICP ranking; in June 1993, six additional wildcards were given; one of the wildcards was given to a combination of two teams (Chazal and Subaru). The Subaru team did not want to be part of a mixed team, so Chazal was allowed to send a full team.

== Teams ==
Qualified teams

- Banesto
- Carrera Jeans–Tassoni
- Gatorade–Mega Drive–Kenwood
- Motorola
- Festina–Lotus
- ONCE
- Team Telekom
- GB–MG Maglificio
- Novemail–Histor–Laser Computer
- Castorama
- CLAS–Cajastur
- WordPerfect–Colnago–Decca
- Ariostea
- Lampre–Polti

Invited teams

- ZG Mobili
- GAN
- TVM–Bison Kit
- Amaya Seguros
- Lotto
- Chazal–Vetta–MBK

== Cyclists ==
=== By starting number ===
Legend
No.	Starting number worn by the rider during the Tour
Pos.	Position in the general classification
DNF	Denotes a rider who did not finish

No.	Name	Nationality	Team	Pos.	Ref
1	Miguel Induráin	Spain	Banesto	1	
2	Marino Alonso	Spain	Banesto	72	
3	Jean-François Bernard	France	Banesto	49	
4	Pedro Delgado	Spain	Banesto	9	
5	Aitor Garmendia	Spain	Banesto	DNF	
6	Julián Gorospe	Spain	Banesto	74	
7	Prudencio Induráin	Spain	Banesto	126	
8	Gérard Rué	France	Banesto	46	
9	José Ramón Uriarte	Spain	Banesto	94	
11	Claudio Chiappucci	Italy	Carrera Jeans–Tassoni	6	
12	Marco Artunghi	Italy	Carrera Jeans–Tassoni	DNF	
13	Mario Chiesa	Italy	Carrera Jeans–Tassoni	92	
14	Vladimir Poulnikov	Ukraine	Carrera Jeans–Tassoni	10	
15	Stephen Roche	Ireland	Carrera Jeans–Tassoni	13	
16	Fabio Roscioli	Italy	Carrera Jeans–Tassoni	85	
17	Remo Rossi	Italy	Carrera Jeans–Tassoni	DNF	
18	Rolf Sørensen	Denmark	Carrera Jeans–Tassoni	70	
19	Andrea Tafi	Italy	Carrera Jeans–Tassoni	128	
21	Gianni Bugno	Italy	Gatorade–Mega Drive–Kenwood	20	
22	Bruno Boscardin	Italy	Gatorade–Mega Drive–Kenwood	DNF	
23	Giovanni Fidanza	Italy	Gatorade–Mega Drive–Kenwood	125	
24	Laurent Fignon	France	Gatorade–Mega Drive–Kenwood	DNF	
25	Andrea Peron	Italy	Gatorade–Mega Drive–Kenwood	DNF	
26	Abelardo Rondón	Colombia	Gatorade–Mega Drive–Kenwood	DNF	
27	Mario Scirea	Italy	Gatorade–Mega Drive–Kenwood	120	
28	Valerio Tebaldi	Italy	Gatorade–Mega Drive–Kenwood	DNF	
29	Stefano Zanatta	Italy	Gatorade–Mega Drive–Kenwood	104	
31	Andrew Hampsten	United States	Motorola	8	
32	Phil Anderson	Australia	Motorola	84	
33	Frankie Andreu	United States	Motorola	89	
34	Lance Armstrong	United States	Motorola	DNF	
35	Steve Bauer	Canada	Motorola	101	
36	Michel Dernies	Belgium	Motorola	116	
37	Álvaro Mejía	Colombia	Motorola	4	
38	Maximilian Sciandri	Italy	Motorola	71	
39	Sean Yates	Great Britain	Motorola	88	
41	Pascal Lino	France	Festina–Lotus	43	
42	Jean-Philippe Dojwa	France	Festina–Lotus	15	
43	Ramón González Arrieta	Spain	Festina–Lotus	32	
44	Gert Jakobs	Netherlands	Festina–Lotus	127	
45	Thierry Marie	France	Festina–Lotus	DNF	
46	Steven Rooks	Netherlands	Festina–Lotus	DNF	
47	Jean-Paul van Poppel	Netherlands	Festina–Lotus	DNF	
48	Michel Vermote	Belgium	Festina–Lotus	113	
49	Richard Virenque	France	Festina–Lotus	19	
51	Erik Breukink	Netherlands	ONCE	DNF	
52	Johan Bruyneel	Belgium	ONCE	7	
53	Herminio Díaz Zabala	Spain	ONCE	102	
54	Laurent Jalabert	France	ONCE	DNF	
55	Alberto Leanizbarrutia	Spain	ONCE	DNF	
56	Philippe Louviot	France	ONCE	64	
57	Miguel Martínez	Spain	ONCE	58	
58	Neil Stephens	Australia	ONCE	DNF	
59	Alex Zülle	Switzerland	ONCE	41	
61	Giancarlo Perini	Italy	ZG Mobili–Sidi	29	
62	Giuseppe Citterio	Italy	ZG Mobili–Sidi	DNF	
63	Stefano Colagè	Italy	ZG Mobili–Sidi	60	
64	Gianni Faresin	Italy	ZG Mobili–Sidi	11	
65	Massimo Ghirotto	Italy	ZG Mobili–Sidi	33	
66	Mario Mantovan	Italy	ZG Mobili–Sidi	DNF	
67	Nelson Rodríguez	Colombia	ZG Mobili–Sidi	100	
68	Leonardo Sierra	Venezuela	ZG Mobili–Sidi	34	
69	John van den Akker	Netherlands	ZG Mobili–Sidi	80	
71	Olaf Ludwig	Germany	Team Telekom	DNF	
72	Rolf Aldag	Germany	Team Telekom	56	
73	Gerd Audehm	Germany	Team Telekom	99	
74	Udo Bölts	Germany	Team Telekom	25	
75	Christian Henn	Germany	Team Telekom	87	
76	Jens Heppner	Germany	Team Telekom	62	
77	Brian Holm	Denmark	Team Telekom	77	
78	Mario Kummer	Germany	Team Telekom	111	
79	Uwe Raab	Germany	Team Telekom	98	
81	Franco Ballerini	Italy	GB–MG Maglificio	61	
82	Carlo Bomans	Belgium	GB–MG Maglificio	DNF	
83	Mario Cipollini	Italy	GB–MG Maglificio	DNF	
84	Zenon Jaskuła	Poland	GB–MG Maglificio	3	
85	Johan Museeuw	Belgium	GB–MG Maglificio	50	
86	Wilfried Peeters	Belgium	GB–MG Maglificio	86	
87	Laurent Pillon	France	GB–MG Maglificio	66	
88	Flavio Vanzella	Italy	GB–MG Maglificio	51	
89	Franco Vona	Italy	GB–MG Maglificio	21	
91	Éric Boyer	France	GAN	63	
92	Christophe Capelle	France	GAN	115	
93	Philippe Casado	France	GAN	123	
94	Thierry Claveyrolat	France	GAN	28	
95	Jean-Claude Colotti	France	GAN	133	
96	Gilbert Duclos-Lassalle	France	GAN	DNF	
97	Pascal Lance	France	GAN	68	
98	François Lemarchand	France	GAN	59	
99	Francis Moreau	France	GAN	DNF	
101	Robert Millar	Great Britain	TVM–Bison Kit	24	
102	Johan Capiot	Belgium	TVM–Bison Kit	DNF	
103	Gerrit de Vries	Netherlands	TVM–Bison Kit	55	
104	Maarten den Bakker	Netherlands	TVM–Bison Kit	91	
105	Bo Hamburger	Denmark	TVM–Bison Kit	31	
106	Dag Otto Lauritzen	Norway	TVM–Bison Kit	90	
107	Danny Nelissen	Netherlands	TVM–Bison Kit	130	
108	Jesper Skibby	Denmark	TVM–Bison Kit	53	
109	John Talen	Netherlands	TVM–Bison Kit	122	
111	Charly Mottet	France	Histor–Novemail	40	
112	Eddy Bouwmans	Netherlands	Histor–Novemail	45	
113	Bruno Cornillet	France	Histor–Novemail	48	
114	Viatcheslav Ekimov	Russia	Histor–Novemail	35	
115	Wilfried Nelissen	Belgium	Histor–Novemail	DNF	
116	Guy Nulens	Belgium	Histor–Novemail	67	
117	Ronan Pensec	France	Histor–Novemail	47	
118	Marc Sergeant	Belgium	Histor–Novemail	69	
119	Dimitri Zhdanov	Russia	Histor–Novemail	39	
121	Dominique Arnould	France	Castorama	81	
122	Thierry Bourguignon	France	Castorama	36	
123	Laurent Brochard	France	Castorama	44	
124	Laurent Desbiens	France	Castorama	109	
125	Jacky Durand	France	Castorama	121	
126	Fabian Jeker	Switzerland	Castorama	79	
127	Laurent Madouas	France	Castorama	22	
128	Jean-Cyril Robin	France	Castorama	DNF	
129	François Simon	France	Castorama	57	
131	Tony Rominger	Switzerland	CLAS–Cajastur	2	
132	Federico Echave	Spain	CLAS–Cajastur	23	
133	Fernando Escartín	Spain	CLAS–Cajastur	30	
134	Iñaki Gastón	Spain	CLAS–Cajastur	78	
135	Arsenio González	Spain	CLAS–Cajastur	DNF	
136	Francisco Javier Mauleón	Spain	CLAS–Cajastur	26	
137	Jörg Müller	Switzerland	CLAS–Cajastur	52	
138	Abraham Olano	Spain	CLAS–Cajastur	DNF	
139	Jon Unzaga	Spain	CLAS–Cajastur	18	
141	Raúl Alcalá	Mexico	WordPerfect–Colnago–Decca	27	
142	Yvon Ledanois	France	WordPerfect–Colnago–Decca	DNF	
143	Frans Maassen	Netherlands	WordPerfect–Colnago–Decca	106	
144	Frédéric Moncassin	France	WordPerfect–Colnago–Decca	112	
145	Rob Mulders	Netherlands	WordPerfect–Colnago–Decca	134	
146	Jelle Nijdam	Netherlands	WordPerfect–Colnago–Decca	129	
147	Dieter Runkel	Switzerland	WordPerfect–Colnago–Decca	131	
148	Edwig Van Hooydonck	Belgium	WordPerfect–Colnago–Decca	136	
149	Eric Vanderaerden	Belgium	WordPerfect–Colnago–Decca	DNF	
151	Melcior Mauri	Spain	Amaya Seguros	DNF	
152	Tom Cordes	Netherlands	Amaya Seguros	118	
153	Laudelino Cubino	Spain	Amaya Seguros	42	
154	Antonio Martín	Spain	Amaya Seguros	12	
155	Juan Carlos Martín	Spain	Amaya Seguros	82	
156	Jesús Montoya	Spain	Amaya Seguros	117	
157	Javier Murguialday	Spain	Amaya Seguros	95	
158	Per Pedersen	Denmark	Amaya Seguros	DNF	
159	Oliverio Rincón	Colombia	Amaya Seguros	16	
161	Davide Cassani	Italy	Ariostea	105	
162	Bruno Cenghialta	Italy	Ariostea	38	
163	Roberto Conti	Italy	Ariostea	14	
164	Alberto Elli	Italy	Ariostea	17	
165	Andrea Ferrigato	Italy	Ariostea	DNF	
166	Rolf Järmann	Switzerland	Ariostea	54	
167	Michele Paletti	Italy	Ariostea	DNF	
168	Bjarne Riis	Denmark	Ariostea	5	
169	Mauro-Antonio Santaromita	Italy	Ariostea	65	
171	Jan Nevens	Belgium	Lotto	DNF	
172	Serge Baguet	Belgium	Lotto	110	
173	Peter De Clercq	Belgium	Lotto	132	
174	Peter Farazijn	Belgium	Lotto	135	
175	Herman Frison	Belgium	Lotto	114	
176	Luc Roosen	Belgium	Lotto	83	
177	Jim Van De Laer	Belgium	Lotto	DNF	
178	Rik Van Slycke	Belgium	Lotto	DNF	
179	Marc Wauters	Belgium	Lotto	107	
181	Djamolidine Abdoujaparov	Uzbekistan	Lampre–Polti	76	
182	Gianluca Bortolami	Italy	Lampre–Polti	73	
183	Davide Bramati	Italy	Lampre–Polti	96	
184	Stefano Cortinovis	Italy	Lampre–Polti	DNF	
185	Marco Lietti	Italy	Lampre–Polti	DNF	
186	Serguei Outschakov	Ukraine	Lampre–Polti	97	
187	Zbigniew Spruch	Poland	Lampre–Polti	DNF	
188	Ján Svorada	Slovakia	Lampre–Polti	DNF	
189	Marek Szerszyński	Poland	Lampre–Polti	DNF	
191	Éric Caritoux	France	Chazal–Vetta–MBK	37	
192	Laurent Biondi	France	Chazal–Vetta–MBK	103	
193	Jean-Pierre Bourgeot	France	Chazal–Vetta–MBK	124	
194	Pascal Chanteur	France	Chazal–Vetta–MBK	75	
195	Jean-Pierre Delphis	France	Chazal–Vetta–MBK	108	
196	Patrice Esnault	France	Chazal–Vetta–MBK	119	
197	Jaan Kirsipuu	Estonia	Chazal–Vetta–MBK	DNF	
198	Oleg Kozlitine	Kazakhstan	Chazal–Vetta–MBK	DNF	
199	Franck Pineau	France	Chazal–Vetta–MBK	93	

=== By team ===
Banesto
No.	Rider	Pos.
1	Miguel Induráin (ESP)	1
2	Marino Alonso (ESP)	72
3	Jean-François Bernard (FRA)	49
4	Pedro Delgado (ESP)	9
5	Aitor Garmendia (ESP)	DNF
6	Julián Gorospe (ESP)	74
7	Prudencio Induráin (ESP)	126
8	Gérard Rué (FRA)	46
9	José Ramón Uriarte (ESP)	94

Carrera Jeans–Tassoni
No.	Rider	Pos.
11	Claudio Chiappucci (ITA)	6
12	Marco Artunghi (ITA)	DNF
13	Mario Chiesa (ITA)	92
14	Vladimir Poulnikov (UKR)	10
15	Stephen Roche (IRL)	13
16	Fabio Roscioli (ITA)	85
17	Remo Rossi (ITA)	DNF
18	Rolf Sørensen (DEN)	70
19	Andrea Tafi (ITA)	128

Gatorade–Mega Drive–Kenwood
No.	Rider	Pos.
21	Gianni Bugno (ITA)	20
22	Bruno Boscardin (ITA)	DNF
23	Giovanni Fidanza (ITA)	125
24	Laurent Fignon (FRA)	DNF
25	Andrea Peron (ITA)	DNF
26	Abelardo Rondón (COL)	DNF
27	Mario Scirea (ITA)	120
28	Valerio Tebaldi (ITA)	DNF
29	Stefano Zanatta (ITA)	104

Motorola
No.	Rider	Pos.
31	Andrew Hampsten (USA)	8
32	Phil Anderson (AUS)	84
33	Frankie Andreu (USA)	89
34	Lance Armstrong (USA)	DNF
35	Steve Bauer (CAN)	101
36	Michel Dernies (BEL)	116
37	Álvaro Mejía (COL)	4
38	Maximilian Sciandri (ITA)	71
39	Sean Yates (GBR)	88

Festina–Lotus
No.	Rider	Pos.
41	Pascal Lino (FRA)	43
42	Jean-Philippe Dojwa (FRA)	15
43	Ramón González Arrieta (ESP)	32
44	Gert Jakobs (NED)	127
45	Thierry Marie (FRA)	DNF
46	Steven Rooks (NED)	DNF
47	Jean-Paul van Poppel (NED)	DNF
48	Michel Vermote (BEL)	113
49	Richard Virenque (FRA)	19

ONCE
No.	Rider	Pos.
51	Erik Breukink (NED)	DNF
52	Johan Bruyneel (BEL)	7
53	Herminio Díaz Zabala (ESP)	102
54	Laurent Jalabert (FRA)	DNF
55	Alberto Leanizbarrutia (ESP)	DNF
56	Philippe Louviot (FRA)	64
57	Miguel Martínez (ESP)	58
58	Neil Stephens (AUS)	DNF
59	Alex Zülle (SUI)	41

ZG Mobili–Sidi
No.	Rider	Pos.
61	Giancarlo Perini (ITA)	29
62	Giuseppe Citterio (ITA)	DNF
63	Stefano Colagè (ITA)	60
64	Gianni Faresin (ITA)	11
65	Massimo Ghirotto (ITA)	33
66	Mario Mantovan (ITA)	DNF
67	Nelson Rodríguez (COL)	100
68	Leonardo Sierra (VEN)	34
69	John van den Akker (NED)	80

Team Telekom
No.	Rider	Pos.
71	Olaf Ludwig (GER)	DNF
72	Rolf Aldag (GER)	56
73	Gerd Audehm (GER)	99
74	Udo Bölts (GER)	25
75	Christian Henn (GER)	87
76	Jens Heppner (GER)	62
77	Brian Holm (DEN)	77
78	Mario Kummer (GER)	111
79	Uwe Raab (GER)	98

GB–MG Maglificio
No.	Rider	Pos.
81	Franco Ballerini (ITA)	61
82	Carlo Bomans (BEL)	DNF
83	Mario Cipollini (ITA)	DNF
84	Zenon Jaskuła (POL)	3
85	Johan Museeuw (BEL)	50
86	Wilfried Peeters (BEL)	86
87	Laurent Pillon (FRA)	66
88	Flavio Vanzella (ITA)	51
89	Franco Vona (ITA)	21

GAN
No.	Rider	Pos.
91	Éric Boyer (FRA)	63
92	Christophe Capelle (FRA)	115
93	Philippe Casado (FRA)	123
94	Thierry Claveyrolat (FRA)	28
95	Jean-Claude Colotti (FRA)	133
96	Gilbert Duclos-Lassalle (FRA)	DNF
97	Pascal Lance (FRA)	68
98	François Lemarchand (FRA)	59
99	Francis Moreau (FRA)	DNF

TVM–Bison Kit
No.	Rider	Pos.
101	Robert Millar (GBR)	24
102	Johan Capiot (BEL)	DNF
103	Gerrit de Vries (NED)	55
104	Maarten den Bakker (NED)	91
105	Bo Hamburger (DEN)	31
106	Dag Otto Lauritzen (NOR)	90
107	Danny Nelissen (NED)	130
108	Jesper Skibby (DEN)	53
109	John Talen (NED)	122

Histor–Novemail
No.	Rider	Pos.
111	Charly Mottet (FRA)	40
112	Eddy Bouwmans (NED)	45
113	Bruno Cornillet (FRA)	48
114	Viatcheslav Ekimov (RUS)	35
115	Wilfried Nelissen (BEL)	DNF
116	Guy Nulens (BEL)	67
117	Ronan Pensec (FRA)	47
118	Marc Sergeant (BEL)	69
119	Dimitri Zhdanov (RUS)	39

Castorama
No.	Rider	Pos.
121	Dominique Arnould (FRA)	81
122	Thierry Bourguignon (FRA)	36
123	Laurent Brochard (FRA)	44
124	Laurent Desbiens (FRA)	109
125	Jacky Durand (FRA)	121
126	Fabian Jeker (SUI)	79
127	Laurent Madouas (FRA)	22
128	Jean-Cyril Robin (FRA)	DNF
129	François Simon (FRA)	57

CLAS–Cajastur
No.	Rider	Pos.
131	Tony Rominger (SUI)	2
132	Federico Echave (ESP)	23
133	Fernando Escartín (ESP)	30
134	Iñaki Gastón (ESP)	78
135	Arsenio González (ESP)	DNF
136	Francisco Javier Mauleón (ESP)	26
137	Jörg Müller (SUI)	52
138	Abraham Olano (ESP)	DNF
139	Jon Unzaga (ESP)	18

WordPerfect–Colnago–Decca
No.	Rider	Pos.
141	Raúl Alcalá (MEX)	27
142	Yvon Ledanois (FRA)	DNF
143	Frans Maassen (NED)	106
144	Frédéric Moncassin (FRA)	112
145	Rob Mulders (NED)	134
146	Jelle Nijdam (NED)	129
147	Dieter Runkel (SUI)	131
148	Edwig Van Hooydonck (BEL)	136
149	Eric Vanderaerden (BEL)	DNF

Amaya Seguros
No.	Rider	Pos.
151	Melcior Mauri (ESP)	DNF
152	Tom Cordes (NED)	118
153	Laudelino Cubino (ESP)	42
154	Antonio Martín (ESP)	12
155	Juan Carlos Martín (ESP)	82
156	Jesús Montoya (ESP)	117
157	Javier Murguialday (ESP)	95
158	Per Pedersen (DEN)	DNF
159	Oliverio Rincón (COL)	16

Ariostea
No.	Rider	Pos.
161	Davide Cassani (ITA)	105
162	Bruno Cenghialta (ITA)	38
163	Roberto Conti (ITA)	14
164	Alberto Elli (ITA)	17
165	Andrea Ferrigato (ITA)	DNF
166	Rolf Järmann (SUI)	54
167	Michele Paletti (ITA)	DNF
168	Bjarne Riis (DEN)	5
169	Mauro-Antonio Santaromita (ITA)	65

Lotto
No.	Rider	Pos.
171	Jan Nevens (BEL)	DNF
172	Serge Baguet (BEL)	110
173	Peter De Clercq (BEL)	132
174	Peter Farazijn (BEL)	135
175	Herman Frison (BEL)	114
176	Luc Roosen (BEL)	83
177	Jim Van De Laer (BEL)	DNF
178	Rik Van Slycke (BEL)	DNF
179	Marc Wauters (BEL)	107

Lampre–Polti
No.	Rider	Pos.
181	Djamolidine Abdoujaparov (UZB)	76
182	Gianluca Bortolami (ITA)	73
183	Davide Bramati (ITA)	96
184	Stefano Cortinovis (ITA)	DNF
185	Marco Lietti (ITA)	DNF
186	Serguei Outschakov (UKR)	97
187	Zbigniew Spruch (POL)	DNF
188	Ján Svorada (SVK)	DNF
189	Marek Szerszyński (POL)	DNF

Chazal–Vetta–MBK
No.	Rider	Pos.
191	Éric Caritoux (FRA)	37
192	Laurent Biondi (FRA)	103
193	Jean-Pierre Bourgeot (FRA)	124
194	Pascal Chanteur (FRA)	75
195	Jean-Pierre Delphis (FRA)	108
196	Patrice Esnault (FRA)	119
197	Jaan Kirsipuu (EST)	DNF
198	Oleg Kozlitine (KAZ)	DNF
199	Franck Pineau (FRA)	93

=== By nationality ===
Country	No. of riders	In competition	Stage wins
Australia	2	1	
Belgium	21	14	2 (Wilfried Nelissen, Johan Bruyneel)
Canada	1	1	
Colombia	4	3	1 (Oliverio Rincón)
Denmark	6	5	2 (Jesper Skibby, Bjarne Riis)
Estonia	1	0	
France	39	32	1 (Pascal Lino)
Germany	8	7	1 (Olaf Ludwig)
Great Britain	2	2	
Republic of Ireland	1	1	
Italy	35	23	3 (Mario Cipollini, Fabio Roscioli, Claudio Chiappucci)
Kazakhstan	1	0	
Mexico	1	1	
Netherlands	14	11	
Norway	1	1	
Poland	3	1	1 (Zenon Jaskula)
Russia	2	2	
Slovakia	1	0	
Spain	24	19	2 (Miguel Indurain x2)
Switzerland	6	6	3 (Tony Rominger x3)
United States	3	2	1 (Lance Armstrong)
Uzbekistan	1	1	3 (Djamolidine Abdoujaparov x3)
Venezuela	1	1	
Total	180	136	20
