= 1994 Critérium du Dauphiné Libéré =

Race details
- Dates: 30 May – 6 June 1994
- Stages: 7 + Prologue
- Distance: 1,207.4 km (750.2 mi)
- Winning time: 32h 21' 53"

Results
Jersey awarded to the overall winner	Winner	Laurent Dufaux (SUI)	(ONCE)
	Second	Ronan Pensec (FRA)	(Novemail–Histor–Laser Computer)
	Third	Artūras Kasputis (LTU)	(Chazal–MBK)
Jersey awarded to the mountains classification winner	Mountains	Pascal Hervé (FRA)	(Festina–Lotus)

The 1994 Critérium du Dauphiné Libéré was the 46th edition of the cycle race and was held from 30 May to 6 June 1994. The race started in Évian-les-Bains and finished in Chambéry. The race was won by the Swiss Laurent Dufaux of the Spanish ONCE team.

== Teams ==
Eleven teams, containing a total of 95 riders, participated in the race:

- Aubervilliers 93
- Castorama
- Catavana
- Chazal–MBK
- Collstrop–Naessens–Concorde
- Festina–Lotus
- GAN
- Novemail–Histor–Laser Computer
- Kelme–Avianca–Gios
- Lotto
- ONCE

== Route ==
Stage characteristics and winners
Stage	Date	Course	Distance	Type	Stage winner
P	30 May 1994	Évian-les-Bains	6.7 km (4.2 mi)	Individual time trial	Chris Boardman (GBR)
1	31 May 1994	Évian-les-Bains to Saint-Priest	224 km (139 mi)	Flat stage	Marcel Wüst (GER)
2	1 June 1994	Charbonnières-les-Bains to Aubenas	208 km (129 mi)	Medium mountain stage	Emmanuel Magnien (FRA)
3	2 June 1994	Romans-sur-Isère to Romans-sur-Isère	38 km (24 mi)	Individual time trial	Chris Boardman (GBR)
4	3 June 1994	Romans-sur-Isère to Échirolles	196 km (122 mi)	Flat stage	Emmanuel Magnien (FRA)
5	4 June 1994	Échirolles to Le Collet d'Allevard	173.5 km (107.8 mi)	High mountain stage	Pascal Hervé (FRA)
6	5 June 1994	Allevard to Chambéry	203.5 km (126.4 mi)	Medium mountain stage	Ronan Pensec (FRA)
7	6 June 1994	Chambéry to Chambéry	157 km (98 mi)	Medium mountain stage	Chris Boardman (GBR)

== Stages ==
=== Prologue ===
30 May 1994 – Évian-les-Bains, 6.7 km (4.2 mi) (ITT)

Prologue result and general classification after Prologue

Rank	Rider	Team	Time
1	Chris Boardman (GBR)	GAN	8' 50"
2	Jean-Philippe Dojwa (FRA)	GAN	+ 1"
3	Emmanuel Magnien (FRA)	Castorama	+ 2"

=== Stage 1 ===
31 May 1994 – Évian-les-Bains to Saint-Priest, 224 km (139.2 mi)

Stage 1 result

Rank	Rider	Team	Time
1	Marcel Wüst (GER)	Novemail–Histor–Laser Computer	5h 54' 47"
2	Wiebren Veenstra (NED)	Collstrop–Naessens–Concorde	s.t.
3	Emmanuel Magnien (FRA)	Castorama	s.t.

General classification after Stage 1

Rank	Rider	Team	Time
1	Chris Boardman (GBR)	GAN	6h 03' 37"
2	Jean-Philippe Dojwa (FRA)	GAN	+ 1"
3	Emmanuel Magnien (FRA)	Castorama	+ 2"

=== Stage 2 ===
1 June 1994 – Charbonnières-les-Bains to Aubenas, 208 km (129.2 mi)

Stage 2 result

Rank	Rider	Team	Time
1	Emmanuel Magnien (FRA)	Castorama	5h 30' 36"
2	Ronan Pensec (FRA)	Novemail–Histor–Laser Computer	s.t.
3	Cezary Zamana (POL)	Kelme–Avianca–Gios	s.t.

General classification after Stage 2

Rank	Rider	Team	Time
1	Jean-Philippe Dojwa (FRA)	GAN	11h 34' 14"
2	Emmanuel Magnien (FRA)	Castorama	+ 1"
3	Ronan Pensec (FRA)	Novemail–Histor–Laser Computer	+ 4"

=== Stage 3 ===
2 June 1994 – Romans-sur-Isère to Romans-sur-Isère, 38 km (23.6 mi) (ITT)

Stage 3 result

Rank	Rider	Team	Time
1	Chris Boardman (GBR)	GAN	47' 27"
2	Artūras Kasputis (LTU)	Chazal–MBK	+ 14"
3	Laurent Dufaux (SUI)	ONCE	+ 1' 14"

General classification after Stage 3

Rank	Rider	Team	Time
1	Chris Boardman (GBR)	GAN	12h 21' 53"
2	Artūras Kasputis (LTU)	Chazal–MBK	+ 18"
3	Laurent Dufaux (SUI)	ONCE	+ 1' 14"

=== Stage 4 ===
3 June 1994 – Romans-sur-Isère to Échirolles, 196 km (121.8 mi)

Stage 4 result

Rank	Rider	Team	Time
1	Emmanuel Magnien (FRA)	Castorama	5h 08' 27"
2	Sean Kelly (IRL)	Catavana	s.t.
3	Greg LeMond (USA)	GAN	s.t.

General classification after Stage 4

Rank	Rider	Team	Time
1	Chris Boardman (GBR)	GAN	17h 30' 20"
2	Artūras Kasputis (LTU)	Chazal–MBK	+ 18"
3	Laurent Dufaux (SUI)	ONCE	+ 1' 14"

=== Stage 5 ===
4 June 1994 – Échirolles to Le Collet d'Allevard, 173.5 km (107.8 mi)

Stage 5 result

Rank	Rider	Team	Time
1	Pascal Hervé (FRA)	Festina–Lotus	5h 29' 19"
2	Ronan Pensec (FRA)	Novemail–Histor–Laser Computer	+ 35"
3	Richard Virenque (FRA)	Festina–Lotus	+ 1' 18"

General classification after Stage 5

Rank	Rider	Team	Time
1	Laurent Dufaux (SUI)	ONCE	23h 02' 27"
2	Ronan Pensec (FRA)	Novemail–Histor–Laser Computer	+ 55"
3	Artūras Kasputis (LTU)	Chazal–MBK	+ 1' 11"

=== Stage 6 ===
5 May 1994 – Allevard to Chambéry, 203.5 km (126.4 mi)

Stage 6 result

Rank	Rider	Team	Time
1	Ronan Pensec (FRA)	Novemail–Histor–Laser Computer	5h 33' 25"
2	Richard Virenque (FRA)	Festina–Lotus	s.t.
3	Luc Roosen (BEL)	Festina–Lotus	s.t.

General classification after Stage 6

Rank	Rider	Team	Time
1	Laurent Dufaux (SUI)	ONCE	28h 35' 52"
2	Ronan Pensec (FRA)	Novemail–Histor–Laser Computer	+ 55"
3	Artūras Kasputis (LTU)	Chazal–MBK	+ 1' 11"

=== Stage 7 ===
6 June 1994 – Chambéry to Chambéry, 157 km (97.6 mi)

Stage 7 result

Rank	Rider	Team	Time
1	Chris Boardman (GBR)	GAN	3h 44' 03"
2	Ronan Pensec (FRA)	Novemail–Histor–Laser Computer	+ 1' 58"
3	Laurent Dufaux (SUI)	ONCE	s.t.

General classification after Stage 7

Rank	Rider	Team	Time
1	Laurent Dufaux (SUI)	ONCE	32h 21' 53"
2	Ronan Pensec (FRA)	Novemail–Histor–Laser Computer	+ 55"
3	Artūras Kasputis (LTU)	Chazal–MBK	+ 1' 25"

== General classification ==
Final general classification

Rank	Rider	Team	Time
1	Laurent Dufaux (SUI)	ONCE	32h 21' 53"
2	Ronan Pensec (FRA)	Novemail–Histor–Laser Computer	+ 55"
3	Artūras Kasputis (LTU)	Chazal–MBK	+ 1' 25"
4	Didier Rous (FRA)	GAN	+ 1' 36"
5	Pascal Hervé (FRA)	Festina–Lotus	+ 1' 39"
6	Richard Virenque (FRA)	Festina–Lotus	+ 1' 42"
7	Ignacio García Camacho (ESP)	Kelme–Avianca–Gios	+ 2' 31"
8	Patrick Jonker (AUS)	Novemail–Histor–Laser Computer	+ 2' 53"
9	Éric Caritoux (FRA)	Chazal–MBK	+ 4' 36"
10	Christophe Manin (FRA)	Chazal–MBK	+ 5' 08"
