= 1995 Vuelta a Burgos =

Race details
- Dates: 7–10 August 1995
- Stages: 4
- Distance: 649.9 km (403.8 mi)
- Winning time: 17h 08' 16"

Results
	Winner	Laurent Dufaux (SUI)	(Festina–Lotus)
	Second	Stefano Della Santa (ITA)	(Mapei–GB–Latexco)
	Third	Gabriele Colombo (ITA)	(Gewiss–Ballan)

The 1995 Vuelta a Burgos was the 17th edition of the Vuelta a Burgos road cycling stage race, which was held from 7 August to 10 August 1995. The race started and finished in Burgos. The race was won by Laurent Dufaux of the Festina–Lotus team.

== General classification ==
Final general classification

Rank	Rider	Team	Time
1	Laurent Dufaux (SUI)	Festina–Lotus	17h 08' 16"
2	Stefano Della Santa (ITA)	Mapei–GB–Latexco	+ 13"
3	Gabriele Colombo (ITA)	Gewiss–Ballan	+ 49"
4	Viatcheslav Ekimov (RUS)	Novell–Decca–Colnago	+ 1' 05"
5	Bruno Cenghialta (ITA)	Gewiss–Ballan	+ 1' 12"
6	Vicente Aparicio (ESP)	Banesto	+ 1' 32"
7	Erik Breukink (NED)	ONCE	+ 1' 50"
8	Vladimir Poulnikov (RUS)	Team Telekom	+ 2' 01"
9	Álvaro Mejía (COL)	Motorola	+ 2' 06"
10	Lance Armstrong (USA)	Motorola	+ 2' 41"
