= 1992 GP Ouest-France =

Race details
- Dates: 30 August 1992
- Stages: 1
- Distance: 209 km (129.9 mi)
- Winning time: 5h 10' 47"

Results
	Winner	Ronan Pensec (FRA)	(RMO)
	Second	Serge Baguet (BEL)	(Lotto–Mavic–MBK)
	Third	Thierry Claveyrolat (FRA)	(Z)

The 1992 GP Ouest-France was the 56th edition of the GP Ouest-France cycle race. It was held on 30 August 1992. The race started and finished in Plouay. It was won by Ronan Pensec of the RMO team.

== General classification ==
Final general classification

Rank	Rider	Team	Time
1	Ronan Pensec (FRA)	RMO	5h 10' 47"
2	Serge Baguet (BEL)	Lotto–Mavic–MBK	+ 2"
3	Thierry Claveyrolat (FRA)	Z	+ 2"
4	Jean-Claude Colotti (FRA)	Z	+ 2"
5	Frans Maassen (NED)	Buckler–Colnago–Decca	+ 2"
6	Udo Bölts (GER)	Team Telekom	+ 6"
7	Laurent Dufaux (SUI)	Helvetia–Commodore	+ 6"
8	Marc Madiot (FRA)	Team Telekom	+ 14"
9	Éric Caritoux (FRA)	RMO	+ 14"
10	Gilbert Duclos-Lassalle (FRA)	Z	+ 14"
