= Novemail–Histor–Laser Computer =

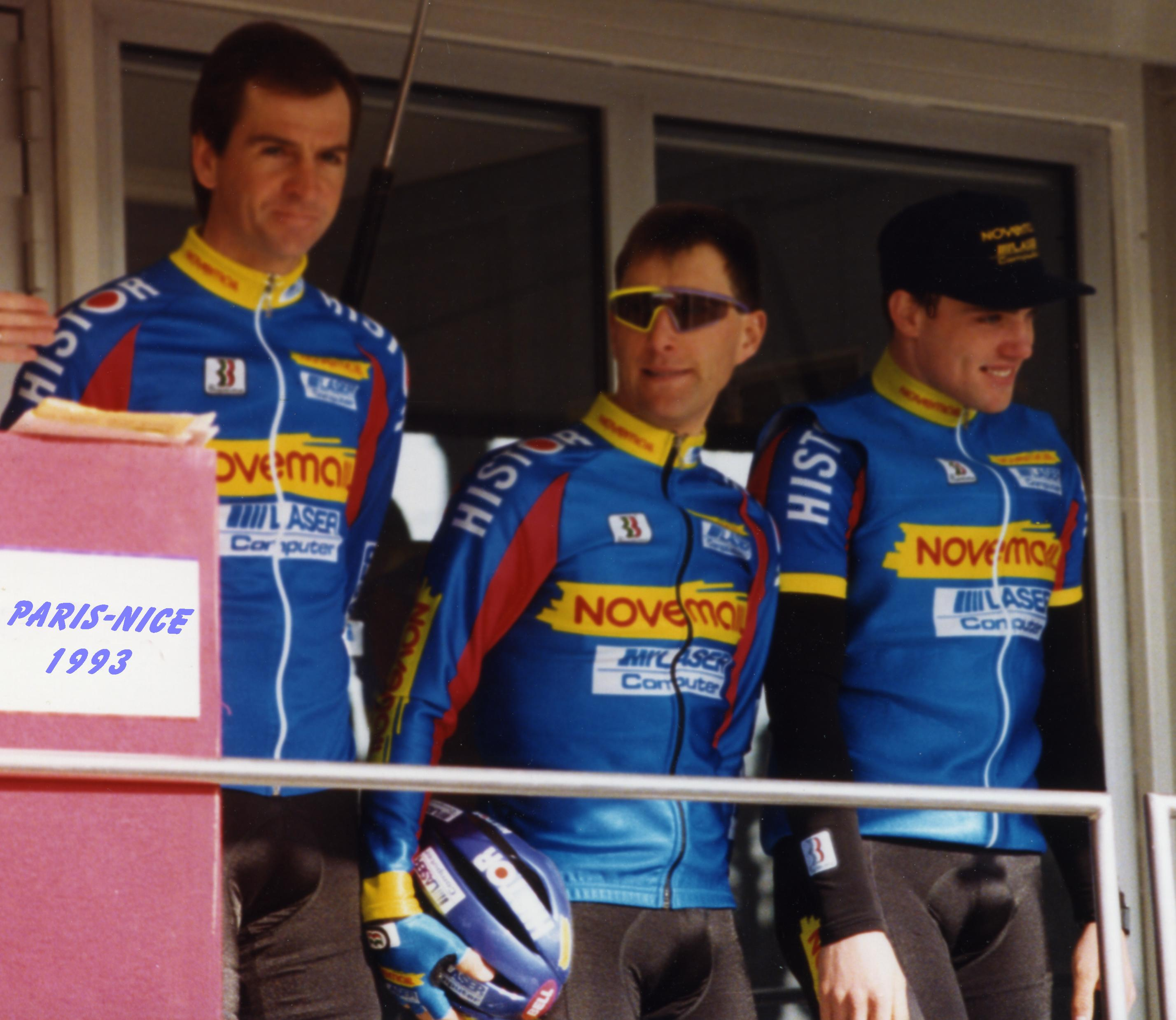
- The team at the 1993 Paris–Nice

Team information
- UCI code: NOV
- Registered: France
- Founded: 1993
- Disbanded: 1994
- Discipline: Road

Key personnel
- General manager: Peter Post

Team name history
- 1993–1994: Novemail–Histor–Laser Computer

Novemail–Histor–Laser Computer (UCI team code: NOV) was a French professional cycling team that existed in 1993 and 1994. The team participated in the 1993 and 1994 editions of the Tour de France.

== 1994 Team roster ==
As of 1 January 1994

Rider	Date of birth
Eddy Bouwmans (NED)	30 January 1968 (aged 25)
Bruno Cornillet (FRA)	8 February 1963 (aged 30)
Gerrit de Vries (NED)	13 May 1967 (aged 26)
Patrick De Wael (BEL)	11 April 1966 (aged 27)
Dirk De Wolf (BEL)	16 January 1961 (aged 32)
Patrick Jonker (AUS)	25 May 1969 (aged 24)
Thierry Laurent (FRA)	13 September 1966 (aged 27)
Philippe Louviot (FRA)	14 March 1964 (aged 29)
Charly Mottet (FRA)	16 December 1962 (aged 31)
Wilfried Nelissen (BEL)	5 May 1970 (aged 23)
Guy Nulens (BEL)	27 October 1957 (aged 36)

Rider	Date of birth
Ronan Pensec (FRA)	10 July 1963 (aged 30)
Jo Planckaert (BEL)	16 December 1970 (aged 23)
Eddy Schurer (NED)	12 September 1964 (aged 29)
Marc Sergeant (BEL)	16 August 1959 (aged 34)
Gilles Talmant (FRA)	27 April 1970 (aged 23)
Raymond Thebes (NED)	11 October 1969 (aged 24)
Niels van der Steen (NED)	31 January 1972 (aged 21)
Cédric Vasseur (FRA)	18 August 1970 (aged 23)
Nico Verhoeven (NED)	2 October 1961 (aged 32)
Marcel Wüst (GER)	6 August 1967 (aged 26)

== Major wins ==
1993
Vuelta a Andalucía

Stage 2, Wilfried Nelissen
Stage 3, Jo Planckaert

Overall Tour Méditerranéen Cycliste Professionnel, Charly Mottet

Stage 3, Charly Mottet

Omloop Het Volk, Wilfried Nelissen
Memorial Samyn, Wilfried Nelissen
Clásica de Almería, Viatcheslav Ekimov
Vuelta a Murcia

Stage 2, Viatcheslav Ekimov
Stage 4, Marcel Wüst

Grand Prix de Denain, Marcel Wüst
Tour de Vendée, Dimitri Zhdanov
Stage 2 4 Jours de Dunkerque, Viatcheslav Ekimov
Stage 5 Vuelta Asturias, Viatcheslav Ekimov
Classique des Alpes, Eddy Bouwmans
A Travers le Morbihan, Marcel Wüst
Stage 4 Critérium du Dauphiné Libéré, Eddy Bouwmans
Stage 5 Tour de Suisse, Viatcheslav Ekimov
Stage 2 Tour de France, Wilfried Nelissen
Stages 1, 2 & 4 Ronde van Nederland, Wilfried Nelissen
Overall Tour du Limousin, Charly Mottet

Stage 4b, Charly Mottet

Stage 2 Vuelta a Burgos, Marcel Wüst
Stage 1 Volta a Catalunya, Marcel Wüst
Stage 6 Tour de l'Avenir, Cédric Vasseur
Paris–Bourges, Bruno Cornillet
Stages 3 & 7b Herald Sun Tour, Marcel Wüst
1994
Étoile de Bessèges

Stages 1 & 3, Wilfried Nelissen
Stage 4, Nico Verhoeven

Stage 3 La Méditerranéenne, Wilfried Nelissen
Omloop Het Volk, Wilfried Nelissen
Stage 7 Paris–Nice, Charly Mottet
Stage 1 Critérium International, Eddy Bouwmans
Stages 1 & 2 Four Days of Dunkirk, Wilfried Nelissen
Binche–Chimay–Binche, Wilfried Nelissen
Stage 10 Olympia's Tour, Raymond Thebes
Critérium du Dauphiné Libéré

Stage 1, Marcel Wüst
Stage 6, Ronan Pensec

Stage 4 Vuelta a Asturias, Wilfried Nelissen
Belgium National Road Race Championship, Wilfried Nelissen
Stage 3 Tour du Limousin, Eddy Bouwmans
Grand Prix d'Isbergues, Wilfried Nelissen
Stage 1 Herald Sun Tour, Marcel Wüst

=== Supplementary statistics ===
Grand Tours by highest finishing position
Race	1993	1994
Vuelta a España	–	–
Giro d'Italia	–	–
Tour de France	35	26
Major week-long stage races by highest finishing position
Race	1993	1994
Paris–Nice	15	4
Tirreno–Adriatico	–	–
Volta a Catalunya	20	–
Tour of the Basque Country	21	–
Tour de Romandie	–	–
Critérium du Dauphiné	19	2
Tour de Suisse	4	22
Tour de Pologne	–	–
Ronde van Nederland	5	14
Monument races by highest finishing position
Monument	1993	1994
Milan–San Remo	12	18
Tour of Flanders	4	8
Paris–Roubaix	7	10
Liège–Bastogne–Liège	8	13
Giro di Lombardia	5	32
Classics by highest finishing position
Classic	1993	1994
Omloop Het Volk	1	1
Kuurne–Brussels–Kuurne	NH	15
E3 Harelbeke	7	6
Gent–Wevelgem	8	10
Amstel Gold Race	17	20
La Flèche Wallonne	21	9
Clásica de San Sebastián	7	45
Paris–Tours	13	9

Legend
—	Did not compete
DNF	Did not finish
NH	Not held
