= 1994 Paris–Nice =

Race details
- Dates: 6–13 March 1994
- Stages: 8
- Distance: 1,410.3 km (876.3 mi)
- Winning time: 37h 16' 05"

Results
Jersey awarded to the overall winner	Winner	Tony Rominger (SUI)	(Mapei–CLAS)
	Second	Jesús Montoya (ESP)	(Banesto)
	Third	Viatcheslav Ekimov (RUS)	(WordPerfect–Colnago–Decca)

The 1994 Paris–Nice was the 52nd edition of the Paris–Nice cycle race and was held from 6 March to 13 March 1994. The race started in Fontenay-sous-Bois and finished at the Col d'Èze. The race was won by Tony Rominger of the Mapei team.

== Route ==
Stage characteristics and winners
Stage	Date	Course	Distance	Type	Winner
1	6 March	Fontenay-sous-Bois to Orléans	185.5 km (115.3 mi)		Mario Cipollini (ITA)
2	7 March	Gien to Nevers	161 km (100 mi)		Fabio Baldato (ITA)
3	8 March	Nevers to Clermont-Ferrand	202 km (126 mi)		Djamolidine Abdoujaparov (UZB)
4	9 March	Clermont-Ferrand to Saint-Étienne	156 km (97 mi)		Fabio Baldato (ITA)
5	10 March	Saint-Étienne to Vaujany	199.3 km (123.8 mi)		Pascal Richard (SUI)
6	11 March	Beaumes-de-Venise to Marseille	195 km (121 mi)		Mario Cipollini (ITA)
7	12 March	Toulon to Mandelieu-la-Napoule	199 km (124 mi)		Charly Mottet (FRA)
8a	13 March	Mandelieu-la-Napoule to Nice	100 km (62 mi)		Djamolidine Abdoujaparov (UZB)
8b	13 March	Nice to Col d'Èze	12.5 km (7.8 mi)	Individual time trial	Tony Rominger (SUI)

== General classification ==
Final general classification

Rank	Rider	Team	Time
1	Tony Rominger (SUI)	Mapei–CLAS	37h 16' 05"
2	Jesús Montoya (ESP)	Banesto	+ 36"
3	Viatcheslav Ekimov (RUS)	WordPerfect–Colnago–Decca	+ 1' 30"
4	Ronan Pensec (FRA)	Novemail–Histor–Laser Computer	+ 1' 41"
5	Laurent Roux (FRA)	Castorama	+ 1' 53"
6	Vicente Aparicio (ESP)	Banesto	+ 2' 38"
7	Pascal Richard (SUI)	GB–MG Maglificio	+ 2' 47"
8	Jean-François Bernard (FRA)	Banesto	+ 2' 53"
9	Gianni Bugno (ITA)	Team Polti–Vaporetto	+ 3' 00"
10	Eddy Seigneur (FRA)	GAN	+ 3' 11"
