= 1998 Tour de Romandie =

Race details
- Dates: 5–10 May 1998
- Stages: 5 + Prologue
- Distance: 794.5 km (493.7 mi)
- Winning time: 20h 09' 33"

Results
	Winner	Laurent Dufaux (SUI)	(Festina–Lotus)
	Second	Alex Zülle (SUI)	(Festina–Lotus)
	Third	Francesco Casagrande (ITA)	(Cofidis)

The 1998 Tour de Romandie was the 52nd edition of the Tour de Romandie cycle race and was held from 5 May to 10 May 1998. The race started in Rheinfelden and finished in Geneva. The race was won by Laurent Dufaux of the Festina team.

== General classification ==
Final general classification
Rank	Rider	Team	Time
1	Laurent Dufaux (SUI)	Festina–Lotus	20h 09' 33"
2	Alex Zülle (SUI)	Festina–Lotus	+ 1' 17"
3	Francesco Casagrande (ITA)	Cofidis	+ 1' 23"
4	Santiago Botero (COL)	Kelme–Costa Blanca	+ 1' 27"
5	Roland Meier (SUI)	Cofidis	+ 1' 39"
6	Davide Rebellin (ITA)	Team Polti	+ 1' 44"
7	Luc Leblanc (FRA)	Team Polti	+ 2' 11"
8	Ivan Gotti (ITA)	Saeco–Cannondale	+ 2' 12"
9	Pavel Tonkov (RUS)	Mapei–Bricobi	+ 2' 28"
10	Paolo Savoldelli (ITA)	Saeco–Cannondale	+ 2' 53"
