= 1994 Ronde van Nederland =

Dutch cycling race

These are the results for the 34th edition of the Ronde van Nederland cycling race, which was held from August 15 to August 19, 1994. The race started in Breda (North Brabant) and finished in Valkenburg (Limburg).

== Stages ==
=== 15-08-1994: Breda-Nieuwegein, 180 km ===
RANK	CYCLIST	TEAM	TIME
1.	Dimitri Konyshev (RUS)	Jolly Componibili–Cage	04:09:33
2.	Luca Scinto (ITA)	GB–MG Maglificio	—
3.	Djamolidine Abdoujaparov (UZB)	Team Polti–Vaporetto	+23s

=== 16-08-1994: Nieuwegein-Ede, 178 km ===
RANK	CYCLIST	TEAM	TIME
1.	Djamolidine Abdoujaparov (UZB)	Team Polti–Vaporetto	04:19:50
2.	Fabio Baldato (ITA)	GB–MG Maglificio	—
3.	Wilfried Nelissen (BEL)	Novemail–Histor–Laser Computer	—

=== 17-08-1994: Ede-Haaksbergen, 101 km ===
RANK	CYCLIST	TEAM	TIME
1.	Wiebren Veenstra (NED)	Collstrop–Willy Naessens	02:24:47
2.	Djamolidine Abdoujaparov (UZB)	Team Polti–Vaporetto	—
3.	Wilfried Nelissen (BEL)	Novemail–Histor–Laser Computer	—

=== 17-08-1994: Haaksbergen-Haaksbergen (Time Trial), 31 km ===
RANK	CYCLIST	TEAM	TIME
1.	Dario Bottaro (ITA)	Gewiss–Ballan	00:37:45
2.	Servais Knaven (NED)	TVM–Bison Kit	+35s
3.	Viatcheslav Ekimov (RUS)	WordPerfect–Colnago–Decca	+17s

=== 18-08-1994: Doetinchem-Venlo, 180 km ===
RANK	CYCLIST	TEAM	TIME
1.	Djamolidine Abdoujaparov (UZB)	Team Polti–Vaporetto	04:50:51
2.	Wilfried Nelissen (BEL)	Novemail–Histor–Laser Computer	—
3.	Silvio Martinello (ITA)	Mercatone Uno–Medeghini	—

=== 19-08-1994: Venlo-Valkenburg, 198 km ===
RANK	CYCLIST	TEAM	TIME
1.	Jesper Skibby (DEN)	TVM–Bison Kit	04:50:51
2.	Erik Zabel (GER)	Team Telekom	+1:36s
3.	Jo Planckaert (BEL)	Collstrop–Willy Naessens	—

== Final classification ==
RANK	NAME CYCLIST	TEAM	TIME
1.	Jesper Skibby (DEN)	TVM–Bison Kit	21:23:25
2.	Djamolidine Abdoujaparov (UZB)	Team Polti–Vaporetto	+ 0.07
3.	Dario Bottaro (ITA)	Gewiss–Ballan	+ 0.22
4.	Viatcheslav Ekimov (RUS)	WordPerfect–Colnago–Decca	+ 0.35
5.	Servais Knaven (NED)	TVM–Bison Kit	+ 0.36
6.	Bjarne Riis (DEN)	Gewiss–Ballan	+ 0.42
7.	Sean Yates (GBR)	Motorola	+ 0.44
8.	Erik Breukink (NED)	ONCE	+ 0.45
9.	Tom Cordes (NED)	WordPerfect–Colnago–Decca	+ 0.57
10.	Luca Scinto (ITA)	GB–MG Maglificio	+ 1.05
