= 1991 Ronde van Nederland =

Dutch cycling race

These are the results for the 31st edition of the Ronde van Nederland cycling race, which was held from August 12 to August 17, 1991. The race started in Dordrecht (South Holland) and finished after 878.6 kilometres in Gulpen (Limburg).

== Final classification ==
RANK	NAME CYCLIST	TEAM	TIME
1.	Frans Maassen (NED)	Buckler–Colnago–Decca	20:38:13
2.	Olaf Ludwig (GER)	Panasonic–Sportlife	+ 0.06
3.	Eddy Schurer (NED)	TVM–Sanyo	+ 0.36
4.	Thierry Marie (FRA)	Castorama–Raleigh	+ 1.17
5.	Jesper Skibby (DEN)	TVM–Sanyo	—
6.	Eric Vanderaerden (BEL)	Buckler–Colnago–Decca	+ 1.27
7.	Tom Cordes (NED)	PDM–Concorde–Ultima	+ 1.30
8.	Dimitri Zhdanov (URS)	Panasonic–Sportlife	+ 1.48
9.	Jelle Nijdam (NED)	Buckler–Colnago–Decca	+ 2.01
10.	Allan Peiper (AUS)	Tulip Computers	+ 2.06
