= Carlos Galarreta =

Spanish cyclist

Personal information
- Full name: Carlos Galarreta Lázaro
- Born: 10 November 1967 (age 58) Ramales de la Victoria, Spain
- Height: 1.74 m (5 ft 9 in)

Cycling career
- Sport: Cycling
- Current team: Retired
- Discipline: Road
- Role: Rider

Professional teams
- 1990–1991: Lotus–Festina
- 1992: Seur
- 1993–1995: Deportpublic

Carlos Galarreta Lázaro (born 10 November 1967) is a Spanish former road cyclist, who competed as a professional from 1990 to 1995. He most notably won the 1993 Vuelta a Murcia.

== Major results ==
1990
4th Overall Vuelta a Cantabria
1991
3rd Overall Route du Sud

1st Stage 4

1993
1st Overall Vuelta a Murcia

=== Grand Tour general classification results timeline ===
Grand Tour	1993	1994	1995
Vuelta a España	78	80	—
Giro d'Italia	—	—	100
Tour de France	—	—	—
