= Viatcheslav Ekimov =

Russian cyclist (born 1966)

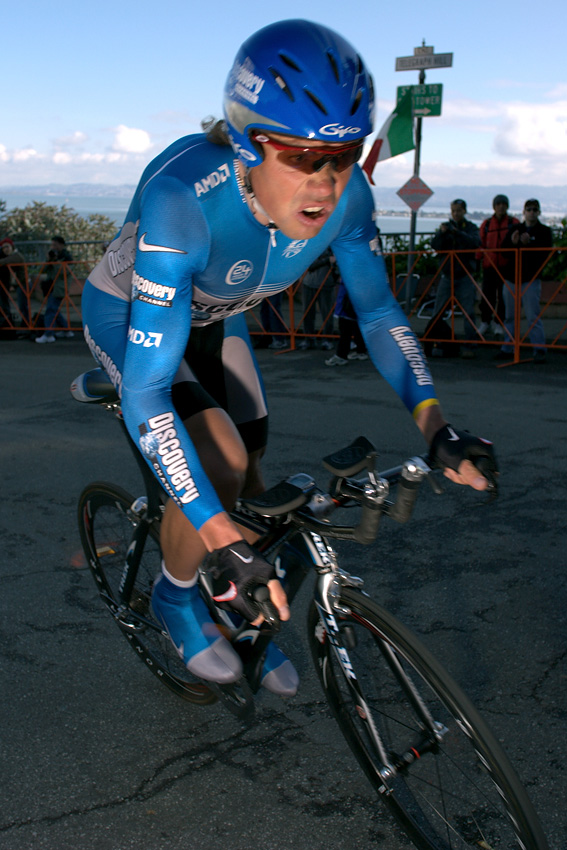
- Ekimov at the 2006 Tour of California

Personal information
- Full name: Viatcheslav Vladimirovich Ekimov
- Nickname: Eki
- Born: 4 February 1966 (age 60) Vyborg, Leningrad Oblast, Russian SFSR, Soviet Union
- Height: 1.76 m (5 ft 9 1/2 in)
- Weight: 69 kg (152 lb; 10 st 12 lb)

Cycling career
- Sport: Cycling
- Current team: Retired
- Disciplines: Road; Track
- Role: Rider; Team manager
- Rider type: Time trialist

Professional teams
- 1990–1992: Panasonic–Sportlife
- 1993: Novemail–Histor–Laser Computer
- 1994–1996: WordPerfect–Colnago–Decca
- 1997–1998: U.S. Postal Service
- 1999: Amica Chips–Costa de Almeria
- 2000–2006: U.S. Postal Service

Managerial teams
- 2009–2011: Team RadioShack
- 2012–2016: Team Katusha

Major wins
- Grand Tours Tour de France 1 individual stage (1991) 4 TTT stages (1990, 1992, 2003, 2004) Vuelta a España 1 individual stage (1999) Stage races Three Days of De Panne (1996, 2000) One-day races and Classics National Road Race Championships (1997) Züri-Metzgete (1992)
Medal record
Representing Soviet Union
Men's track cycling
Olympic Games
Gold medal – first place	1988 Seoul	Track Team Pursuit
UCI Track Cycling World Championships
Gold medal – first place	1985 Bassano del Grappa	Amateur Men's Individual Pursuit
Gold medal – first place	1986 Colorado Springs	Amateur Men's Individual Pursuit
Gold medal – first place	1987 Vienna	Men's Team Pursuit
Gold medal – first place	1989 Lyon	Amateur Men's Individual Pursuit
Gold medal – first place	1990 Maebashi	Professional Men's Individual Pursuit
Gold medal – first place	1991 Stuttgart	Men's Points Race
Silver medal – second place	1987 Vienna	Amateur Men's Individual Pursuit
Silver medal – second place	1989 Lyon	Men's Team Pursuit
Bronze medal – third place	1985 Bassano del Grappa	Men's Team Pursuit
Bronze medal – third place	1986 Colorado Springs	Men's Team Pursuit
Representing Russia
Men's road bicycle racing
Olympic Games
Gold medal – first place	2000 Sydney	Road Time Trial
Gold medal – first place	2004 Athens	Road Time Trial

Viatcheslav Vladimirovich Ekimov (Russian Вячеслав Владимирович Екимов; born 4 February 1966) is a Russian former professional racing cyclist. A triple Olympic gold medalist, he was awarded the title of Russian Cyclist of the Century in 2001.

== Biography ==
Ekimov was born in Vyborg, and started training as a cyclist at age 12 with a bicycle school affiliated with the famous centre of Aleksandr Kuznetsov. He trained in Leningrad at Lokomotiv and later Armed Forces sports society during the Soviet era.

Ekimov won three Olympic gold medals: in the track team pursuit in Seoul (1988) for the USSR, and in an upset, in the road time trial in Sydney (2000) for Russia. At the 2004 Summer Olympics in Athens, Ekimov won the silver medal for Russia in the men's road individual time trial, losing to American Tyler Hamilton. Hamilton later admitted to doping and Ekimov, who had raced for many more years than Tyler with the infamous Lance Armstrong and Johan Bruyneel partnership, was promoted to gold.

Ekimov joined the USPS team in 1997 as its first key international signing, briefly retiring in 2001 before rejoining the team the following year. In the 2003 Tour de France Ekimov placed 10th in the prologue. He was a key force in the winning team time trial effort in stage four and was important to Lance Armstrong's fifth Tour victory both on the flats and in the mountains. He missed the 2005 Tour de France due to injuries received in a training ride with Armstrong in Texas. During the final stage of the 2006 Tour de France, now racing for the Discovery Channel Pro Cycling Team, he announced that the 2006 Tour would be his last. He was honored by the peloton on the final stage, who allowed him to lead them over the line on the first of the eight laps of the Champs-Élysées. Ekimov started and finished 15 Tours de France, tying him with Lucien Van Impe for the second most Tour finishes, behind Joop Zoetemelk and Sylvain Chavanel.

In September 2006 he finished riding for Discovery, but stayed with the team as Assistant Directeur Sportif to Johan Bruyneel. He helped guide the Discovery riders during the U.S. Pro Cycling Championships in 2006 as well as the Tour of California and the Tour de Georgia.

On 9 September 2009, it was announced he would join Team RadioShack as Directeur Sportif.

In October 2012, he was announced as the general manager of the Russian Team Katusha–Alpecin. The UCI, in a letter written to Katusha Team, denied them entrance into the 2013 World Tour. Among the many ethical violations the UCI cited, the appointment of Ekimov was among them for reasons unspecified. After the end of 2016 season Ekimov stepped down from the role.

== Major results ==
1988
1st Team pursuit, Olympic Games
1st Overall Regio-Tour
1st Overall Vuelta al Táchira

1st Prologue, Stages 7 & 8 (ITT)

1st Overall Tour de Normandie
2nd Overall Circuit Cycliste Sarthe
1989
1st Overall Circuit Franco-Belge

1st Stage 5b

1st Stage 1 Tour de Trump
2nd Overall Tour of Sweden
2nd Overall Circuit Cycliste Sarthe
3rd Overall Tour de Normandie
3rd Overall Vuelta al Táchira

1st Prologue & Stage 1

1990
1st Individual pursuit, UCI Track World Championships
1st Stage 2b (ITT) Critérium International
1st Stage 5 Vuelta Asturias
1st Stage 4 (TTT) Tour de France
2nd GP Wielerrevue
3rd Overall Tour Méditerranéen

1st Stage 5 (ITT)

4th Overall Nissan Classic
5th Overall Tour de Trump
8th Overall Setmana Catalana de Ciclisme
9th Overall Tour du Vaucluse

1st Stage 5

9th Overall Tour de la Communauté Européenne
1991
1st Points race, UCI Track World Championships
1st Stage 20 Tour de France
1st Stage 3 (ITT) Critérium International
3rd Grand Prix de la Libération (TTT)
4th Overall Vuelta a Murcia
5th Overall Tour Méditerranéen
5th Overall Settimana Ciclistica Internazionale
7th Overall Four Days of Dunkirk
9th Overall Three Days of De Panne
9th Overall Nissan Classic
9th Milano–Torino
9th Rund um den Henninger Turm
10th Overall Euskal Bizikleta
1992
1st Züri–Metzgete
1st Druivenkoers-Overijse
1st Stage 4 Setmana Catalana de Ciclisme
1st Stage 4 (TTT) Tour de France
2nd Overall Three Days of De Panne
3rd Overall Four Days of Dunkirk

1st Stage 6

3rd Overall GP du Midi Libre

1st Stage 6 (ITT)

3rd Trofeo Melinda
3rd GP Rik Van Steenbergen
3rd Grand Prix des Nations
3rd Baden-Baden (with Olaf Ludwig)
4th La Flèche Wallonne
4th Overall Vuelta a Andalucía
6th Overall Tour Méditerranéen
6th GP Gippingen
6th Rund um den Henninger Turm
9th Giro di Campania
1993
1st Clásica de Almería
1st Stage 5 Tour de Suisse
2nd Overall Four Days of Dunkirk

1st Stage 2

2nd Grand Prix Impanis-Van Petegem
2nd Omloop Mandel-Leie-Schelde
3rd Road race, National Road Championships
4th Overall Vuelta Asturias

1st Stage 5

5th Overall Ronde van Nederland
5th Japan Cup
5th Rund um den Henninger Turm
6th Overall Three Days of De Panne
8th Liège–Bastogne–Liège
9th Overall Vuelta a Murcia

1st Stage 2

9th Grand Prix de Fourmies
10th Giro di Lombardia
1994
1st Overall Volta a la Comunitat Valenciana

1st Stage 2

1st Overall Tour DuPont

1st Stages 5 (ITT) & 11 (ITT)

1st Veenendaal–Veenendaal
1st Stage 2 Tour de Luxembourg
2nd Overall Kellogg's Tour
2nd E3 Harelbeke
2nd Leeds International Classic
3rd Overall Paris–Nice
4th Overall Ronde van Nederland
5th Overall Vuelta a Andalucía
5th Overall Three Days of De Panne
1995
1st Stage 5 Tour de Suisse
2nd Overall Ronde van Nederland

1st Stage 3b

2nd Overall Tour DuPont

1st Stage 11 (ITT)

4th Overall Vuelta a Burgos
4th Paris–Roubaix
7th Overall Volta a la Comunitat Valenciana
7th Overall Setmana Catalana de Ciclisme
8th Overall Paris–Nice
8th Tour of Flanders
1996
1st Overall Three Days of De Panne
3rd Overall Ronde van Nederland
4th Tour of Flanders
4th E3 Harelbeke
5th Grand Prix des Nations
5th Grand Prix Eddy Merckx
6th Overall Vuelta a Murcia

1st Stage 2

7th Overall Tirreno–Adriatico
8th Overall Tour de Luxembourg
8th Paris–Roubaix
8th Japan Cup
9th Time trial, UCI Road World Championships
1997
1st Road race, National Road Championships
1st Stage 5 Vuelta a Castilla y León
2nd Paris–Camembert
3rd Overall Setmana Catalana de Ciclisme

1st Stage 3

4th Overall Paris–Nice

1st Stage 7b (ITT)

4th Overall Ronde van Nederland
5th Overall Volta a la Comunitat Valenciana
5th GP du canton d'Argovie
8th Overall Critérium du Dauphiné Libéré

1st Stages 2 & 4 (ITT)

9th Overall Tour de Romandie
10th Overall Vuelta a Andalucía
10th Tour of Flanders
1998
1st Stage 6 PruTour
2nd Overall Ronde van Nederland
2nd Trofeo Luis Puig
3rd Overall Three Days of De Panne
3rd Grand Prix Eddy Merckx
5th Overall Four Days of Dunkirk
7th Overall Vuelta a Andalucía
7th Tour of Flanders
7th Scheldeprijs
9th Time trial, UCI Road World Championships
1999
1st Stage 15 Vuelta a España
1st Stage 5 (ITT) Tour de Suisse
1st Stage 3 Gran Premio Internacional Telecom
1st Stage 3 Vuelta al Táchira
2000
1st Time trial, Olympic Games
1st Overall Three Days of De Panne

1st Stage 3b (ITT)

1st Grand Prix Eddy Merckx (with Lance Armstrong)
4th Overall Tour de Pologne
10th Chrono des Herbiers
2001
3rd Overall Three Days of De Panne
3rd EnBW Grand Prix (with Víctor Hugo Peña)
6th Overall Volta a la Comunitat Valenciana

1st Stage 5 (ITT)

6th San Francisco Grand Prix
6th Grand Prix Eddy Merckx
7th Overall Ronde van Nederland
7th US Pro Championship
8th Road race, National Road Championships
10th Overall Volta ao Algarve
2002
4th San Francisco Grand Prix
5th Grand Prix Eddy Merckx
6th Grand Prix des Nations
2003
1st Overall Ronde van Nederland

1st Stage 4 (ITT)

1st Stage 4 (TTT) Tour de France
3rd Paris–Roubaix
3rd San Francisco Grand Prix
5th Overall Three Days of De Panne
6th Time trial, UCI Road World Championships
6th Trofeo Laigueglia
7th Grand Prix Eddy Merckx
8th Tour of Flanders
2004
1st Time trial, Olympic Games
1st Stage 4 (TTT) Tour de France
2nd Overall Ronde van Nederland

1st Stage 4 (ITT)

2nd Overall Tour du Languedoc-Roussillon
5th Overall Tour de Georgia
5th Grand Prix Eddy Merckx
2005
1st Stage 4 (ITT) Three Days of De Panne
2006
2nd Eindhoven Team Time Trial

=== Grand Tour general classification results timeline ===
Grand Tour	1990	1991	1992	1993	1994	1995	1996	1997	1998	1999	2000	2001	2002	2003	2004	2005	2006
Giro d'Italia	—	58	—	—	—	—	—	—	—	—	—	—	—	—	—	—	89
Tour de France	55	42	65	35	36	18	21	44	38	—	55	82	58	76	80	—	82
/ Vuelta a España	—	—	—	—	—	—	25	—	64	DNF	55	—	—	—	—	—	—

Legend
—	Did not compete
DNF	Did not finish
