= 2001 Three Days of De Panne =

Race details
- Dates: 3 April–5 April 2001
- Stages: 3
- Distance: 546 km (339 mi)
- Winning time: 13h 20' 46"

Results
	Winner	Nico Mattan (BEL)
	Second	Erik Dekker (NED)
	Third	Viatcheslav Ekimov (RUS)

The 2001 Three Days of De Panne was the 25th edition of the Three Days of De Panne cycle race and was held on 3 April to 5 April 2001. The race started in Mouscron and finished in De Panne. The race was won by Nico Mattan.

== General classification ==
Final general classification

Rank	Rider	Time
1	Nico Mattan (BEL)	13h 20' 46"
2	Erik Dekker (NED)	+ 4"
3	Viatcheslav Ekimov (RUS)	+ 14"
4	Christian Vande Velde (USA)	+ 24"
5	George Hincapie (USA)	+ 27"
6	Philippe Gaumont (FRA)	+ 28"
7	Servais Knaven (NED)	+ 31"
8	Andrei Tchmil (BEL)	+ 37"
9	Niko Eeckhout (BEL)	+ 38"
10	Romāns Vainšteins (LAT)	+ 40"
