= 1993 Critérium du Dauphiné Libéré =

Race details
- Dates: 31 May – 7 June 1993
- Stages: 7 + Prologue
- Distance: 1,147.5 km (713.0 mi)
- Winning time: 32h 11' 31"

Results
Jersey awarded to the overall winner	Winner	Laurent Dufaux (SUI)	(ONCE)
	Second	Oliverio Rincón (COL)	(Amaya Seguros)
	Third	Éric Boyer (FRA)	(GAN)
Jersey awarded to the points classification winner	Points	Jacky Durand (FRA)	(Castorama)
Jersey awarded to the mountains classification winner	Mountains	Thierry Claveyrolat (FRA)	(GAN)
	Team	Festina–Lotus	

The 1993 Critérium du Dauphiné Libéré was the 45th edition of the cycle race and was held from 31 May to 7 June 1993. The race started in Charbonnières-les-Bains and finished in Aix-les-Bains. The race was won by Laurent Dufaux of the ONCE team.

== Teams ==
Fourteen teams, containing a total of 108 riders, participated in the race:

- Novemail–Histor–Laser Computer
- Castorama
- Gatorade–Mega Drive–Kenwood
- GAN
- ONCE
- WordPerfect–Colnago–Decca
- Amaya Seguros
- Festina–Lotus
- Lotto
- Chazal–Vetta–MBK
- Subaru–Montgomery
- Sicasal–Acral
- La William
- Recer–Boavista

== Route ==
Stage characteristics and winners
Stage	Date	Course	Distance	Type	Stage winner
P	31 May 1993	Lyon	4 km (2.5 mi)	Individual time trial	Raúl Alcalá (MEX)
1	1 June 1993	Charbonnières to Guilherand-Granges	188 km (117 mi)	Medium mountain stage	Frédéric Moncassin (FRA)
2	2 June 1993	Guilherand to Saint-Étienne	162.5 km (101 mi)	Flat stage	Gilbert Duclos-Lassalle (FRA)
3	3 June 1993	Saint-Étienne to Saint-Étienne	43.5 km (27 mi)	Individual time trial	Raúl Alcalá (MEX)
4	4 June 1993	Vienne to Bonneville	218.5 km (135.8 mi)	Medium mountain stage	Eddy Bouwmans (NED)
5	5 June 1993	Bonneville to Grenoble	191 km (119 mi)	High mountain stage	Laurent Dufaux (SUI)
6	6 June 1993	Grenoble to Bourg-Saint-Maurice	200 km (120 mi)	High mountain stage	Oliverio Rincón (COL)
7	7 June 1993	Bourg-Saint-Maurice to Aix-les-Bains	140 km (87 mi)	Flat stage	Cezary Zamana (POL)

== General classification ==
Final general classification

Rank	Rider	Team	Time
1	Laurent Dufaux (SUI)	ONCE	32h 11' 31"
2	Oliverio Rincón (COL)	Amaya Seguros	+ 3' 00"
3	Éric Boyer (FRA)	GAN	+ 5' 25"
4	Jean-Philippe Dojwa (FRA)	Festina–Lotus	+ 6' 19"
5	Richard Virenque (FRA)	Festina–Lotus	+ 13' 16"
6	Éric Caritoux (FRA)	Chazal–Vetta–MBK	+ 13' 32"
7	Thierry Claveyrolat (FRA)	GAN	+ 13' 36"
8	Raúl Alcalá (MEX)	WordPerfect–Colnago–Decca	+ 15' 22"
9	Miguel Arroyo (MEX)	Subaru–Montgomery	+ 16' 27"
10	Joaquim Gomes (POR)	Recer–Boavista	+ 20' 12"
