= 1996 Three Days of De Panne =

Race details
- Dates: 2 April–4 April 1996
- Stages: 3
- Distance: 554.2 km (344.4 mi)
- Winning time: 13h 01' 14"

Results
	Winner	Viatcheslav Ekimov (RUS)
	Second	Wilfried Peeters (BEL)
	Third	Olaf Ludwig (GER)

The 1996 Three Days of De Panne was the 20th edition of the Three Days of De Panne cycle race and was held on 2 April to 4 April 1996. The race started in Harelbeke and finished in De Panne. The race was won by Viatcheslav Ekimov.

== General classification ==
Final general classification

Rank	Rider	Time
1	Viatcheslav Ekimov (RUS)	13h 01' 14"
2	Wilfried Peeters (BEL)	+ 23"
3	Olaf Ludwig (GER)	+ 39"
4	Marco Serpellini (ITA)	+ 44"
5	Fabio Baldato (ITA)	+ 57"
6	Gianluca Pianegonda (ITA)	+ 2' 03"
7	Laurent Brochard (FRA)	s.t.
8	Andrea Peron (ITA)	+ 2' 06"
9	Denis Zanette (ITA)	+ 2' 22"
10	Rolf Järmann (SUI)	+ 2' 25"
