= 1993 Ronde van Nederland =

Dutch cycling race

These are the results for the 33rd edition of the Ronde van Nederland cycling race, which was held from August 16 to August 20, 1993. The race started in Leiden (South Holland) and finished in Valkenburg (Limburg).

== Final classification ==
RANK	NAME CYCLIST	TEAM	TIME
1.	Erik Breukink (NED)	ONCE	20:48:22
2.	Jelle Nijdam (NED)	WordPerfect–Colnago–Decca	+ 0.21
3.	Olaf Ludwig (GER)	Team Telekom	+ 0.28
4.	François Simon (FRA)	Castorama	+ 0.35
5.	Viatcheslav Ekimov (RUS)	Novemail–Histor–Laser Computer	+ 0.36
6.	Laurent Desbiens (FRA)	Castorama	+ 0.49
7.	Jesper Skibby (DEN)	TVM–Bison Kit	+ 0.53
8.	Raúl Alcalá (MEX)	WordPerfect–Colnago–Decca	+ 0.54
9.	Tom Cordes (NED)	Amaya Seguros	+ 1.01
10.	Sean Yates (GBR)	Motorola	+ 1.03
