= 2000 Three Days of De Panne =

Race details
- Dates: 28 March–30 March 2000
- Stages: 3
- Distance: 541 km (336 mi)
- Winning time: 13h 59' 40"

Results
	Winner	Viatcheslav Ekimov (RUS)
	Second	Romāns Vainšteins (LAT)
	Third	Sergei Ivanov (RUS)

The 2000 Three Days of De Panne was the 24th edition of the Three Days of De Panne cycle race and was held on 28 March to 30 March 2000. The race started in Mouscron and finished in De Panne. The race was won by Viatcheslav Ekimov.

== General classification ==
Final general classification

Rank	Rider	Time
1	Viatcheslav Ekimov (RUS)	13h 59' 40"
2	Romāns Vainšteins (LAT)	+ 3"
3	Sergei Ivanov (RUS)	+ 39"
4	Andrei Tchmil (BEL)	+ 47"
5	Maarten den Bakker (NED)	+ 48"
6	Martin Hvastija (SLO)	+ 54"
7	Zbigniew Spruch (POL)	+ 59"
8	Frank Høj (DEN)	+ 1' 00"
9	Marco Serpellini (ITA)	+ 1' 02"
10	Geert Van Bondt (BEL)	+ 1' 03"
