= Laurent Dufaux =

Swiss cyclist (born 1969)

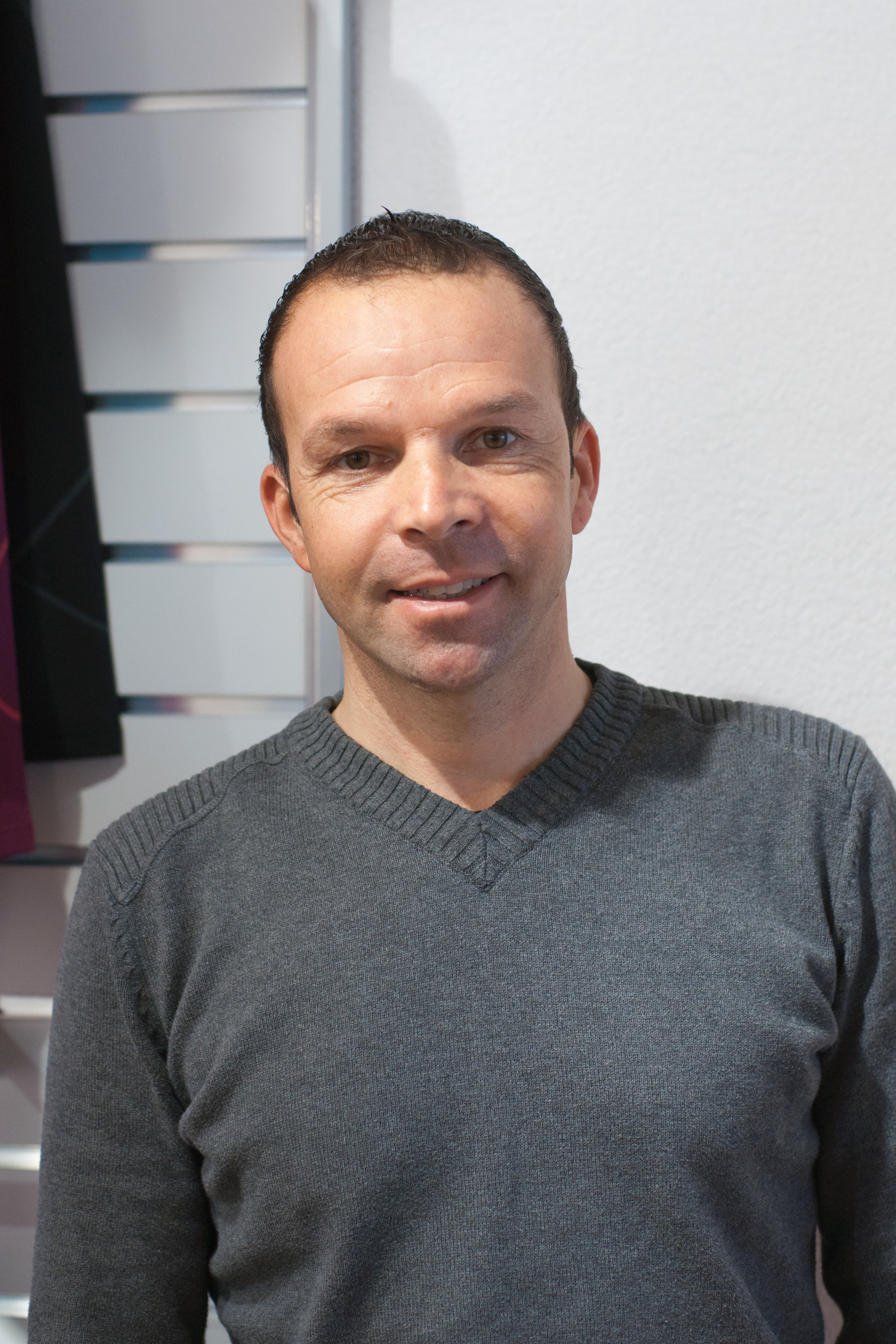

Personal information
- Full name: Laurent Dufaux
- Born: 20 May 1969 (age 57) Montreux, Switzerland
- Height: 1.69 m (5 ft 7 in)
- Weight: 60 kg (132 lb; 9 st 6 lb)

Cycling career
- Sport: Cycling
- Discipline: Road
- Role: Rider
- Rider type: Climber

Professional teams
- 1991–1992: Helvetia
- 1993–1994: ONCE
- 1995–1998: Festina
- 1999–2001: Saeco
- 2002–2003: Alessio
- 2004: Quick-Step–Davitamon

Major wins
- Grand Tours Tour de France 1 individual stage (1996) Vuelta a España 1 individual stage (1996) Stage races Critérium du Dauphiné Libéré (1993, 1994) Tour de Romandie (1998) One-day races and Classics National Road Race Championships (1991)

Laurent Dufaux (born 20 May 1969 in Montreux, Switzerland) is a former professional road cyclist from 1991 to 2004. He was the Swiss National Road Race champion in 1991. Despite being a climber, he also won the hilly Züri-Metzgete one-day classic in 2000, outsprinting Jan Ullrich and Francesco Casagrande in a flat three-man group sprint finish. Notable results in the Grand Tours include a 4th place overall finish in both the 1996 and 1999 Tour de France and 2nd and 3rd place finishes in the 1996 and 1997 Vuelta a España, respectively. He also won the 1998 edition of his home region race, the Tour de Romandie, the 1993 and 1994 editions of the Dauphine Libere, and finished in the top 5 of the Tour de Suisse twice.

Following the exclusion of his Festina team from the 1998 Tour de France due to doping, Laurent Dufaux admitted to doping (alongside his teammates) with EPO throughout the 1998 season. Together with Festina teammates Alex Zülle, Armin Meier, Didier Rous, Laurent Brochard, all of whom confessed like Dufaux, he received a seven-month suspension.

== Major results ==
1990
9th Giro dell'Emilia
1991
1st Road race, National Road Championships
1st Overall Route du Sud
1st Coppa Placci
2nd Giro del Lazio
4th Tour du Nord–Ouest
5th Overall Tour de Romandie
7th Grand Prix Pino Cerami
7th Trofeo Laigueglia
1992
1st Grand Prix Pino Cerami
3rd Tour de Berne
5th Overall Étoile de Bessèges
6th Overall Critérium du Dauphiné Libéré
6th Overall Tour de Romandie
6th Overall Tour of Galicia
6th Overall Euskal Bizikleta
6th Classique des Alpes
7th GP Ouest–France
1993
1st Overall Critérium du Dauphiné Libéré

1st Stage 5

2nd Gran Piemonte
3rd Overall Vuelta a Burgos
3rd Overall Setmana Catalana de Ciclisme
5th Classique des Alpes
7th Overall Vuelta a Murcia
1994
1st Overall Critérium du Dauphiné Libéré
2nd Overall Setmana Catalana de Ciclisme
5th Overall Tour of the Basque Country
5th Leeds International Classic
7th Classique des Alpes
9th Overall Tour de l'Oise

1st Stage 2

1995
1st Overall Vuelta a Burgos

1st Points classification
1st Stages 3 & 4a

1st Overall Route du Sud
1996
2nd Overall Vuelta a España

1st Stage 19

3rd À travers Lausanne
4th Overall Tour de France

1st Stage 17

6th Overall Setmana Catalana de Ciclisme
7th Trofeo Luis Puig
8th Overall Grand Prix du Midi Libre
10th Overall Critérium du Dauphiné Libéré
1997
1st Overall À travers Lausanne

1st Stages 1 (ITT) & 2 (ITT)

1st Stage 2 Grand Prix du Midi Libre
2nd Overall Paris–Nice
3rd Overall Vuelta a España
6th Road race, UCI Road World Championships
6th Overall Vuelta a Burgos
9th Overall Tour de France
1998
1st Overall Tour de Romandie

1st Prologue, Stages 1 & 3

1st Overall Midi Libre

1st Stage 5

4th Overall À travers Lausanne
7th Amstel Gold Race
8th Overall Paris–Nice
9th La Flèche Wallonne
10th Liège–Bastogne–Liège
1999
1st Polynormande
2nd À travers Lausanne
3rd Overall Vuelta a Burgos
4th Overall Tour de France
4th Overall Tour de Suisse
4th Overall Grand Prix du Midi Libre
5th Road race, National Road Championships
2000
1st Züri-Metzgete
3rd Overall Tour de Romandie
3rd À travers Lausanne
3rd Grand Prix Gippingen
5th Coppa Ugo Agostoni
6th Amstel Gold Race
9th Overall Deutschland Tour
2001
1st Stage 3 Giro del Trentino
3rd À travers Lausanne
4th Tre Valli Varesine
9th Giro del Lazio
2002
1st Trofeo Melinda
2nd Giro del Veneto
3rd Tre Valli Varesine
4th Overall Tour de Suisse
4th Overall Giro Riviera Ligure Ponente
6th Grand Prix Gippingen
9th Clásica de San Sebastián
10th Züri-Metzgete
10th Giro dell'Appennino
2003
2nd Overall Tour de Romandie

1st Stage 3

5th Classique des Alpes

=== Grand Tour general classification results timeline ===
Grand Tour	1992	1993	1994	1995	1996	1997	1998	1999	2000	2001	2002	2003	2004
Giro d'Italia	—	—	—	43	—	—	—	—	—	40	—	—	—
Tour de France	DNF	—	35	19	4	9	DNF	4	DNF	—	DNF	21	67
/ Vuelta a España	—	37	—	—	2	3	DNF	DNF	DNF	—	—	—	—

Legend
—	Did not compete
DNF	Did not finish

== See also ==
- List of doping cases in cycling
- List of sportspeople sanctioned for doping offences
