= Eddy Bouwmans =

Dutch cyclist

Personal information
- Full name: Eddy Bouwmans
- Born: 30 January 1968 (age 58) Aarle-Rixtel, the Netherlands

Cycling career
- Sport: Cycling
- Current team: Visma–Lease a Bike
- Discipline: Road
- Role: Rider (retired); Hospitality coordinator

Professional teams
- 1990–1992: Panasonic–Sportlife
- 1993–1994: Novemail–Histor–Laser Computer
- 1995: Novell–Decca–Colnago
- 1996–1997: Foreldorado-Golff

Managerial team
- 2016–: LottoNL–Jumbo

Major wins
- Grand Tours Tour de France Young rider classification (1992) 1 TTT Stage (1992)

Eddy Bouwmans (born 30 January 1968) is a Dutch former road bicycle racer. Bouwmans currently works as a Hospitality Coordinator for UCI WorldTeam Visma–Lease a Bike.

== Career ==
In 1989 at the Tour DuPont Bouwmans finished third in the opening time-trial less than four seconds behind the winner. Bouwmans won the young rider classification in the 1992 Tour de France. He finished fourteenth in the Tour that year. In 1996 Bouwmans came ninth at the Tour of Austria.

== Doping admission ==
In 2013 Bouwmans admitted to having used testosterone and cortisone as a professional rider. He also admitted to have had three injections of EPO in 1994.

== Major results ==
1989
1st Flèche Ardennaise
3rd Ronde van Limburg
1990
5th Overall Étoile de Bessèges
5th Overall Vuelta a Asturias
7th Overall Tour de Suisse
7th Overall Vuelta a Burgos
7th Overall Tour de l'Avenir
1991
6th Overall Critérium du Dauphiné Libéré
6th Overall Tour de Suisse
9th Overall Tour of Britain
1992
Tour de France

1st Young rider classification
1st Stage 4 (TTT)

3rd Clásica de San Sebastián
5th Overall Setmana Catalana de Ciclisme
10th Overall Tour de Suisse
10th Brabantse Pijl
1993
1st Classique des Alpes
1st Stage 4 Critérium du Dauphiné Libéré
3rd Overall Vuelta a Murcia
3rd Eschborn–Frankfurt
4th Overall Tour de Suisse
5th Arnhem–Veenendaal Classic
7th Trophée des Grimpeurs
9th Grand Prix d'Isbergues
1994
1st Stage 1 Critérium International
1st Stage 3 Tour du Limousin
7th Japan Cup
1996
2nd Trofeo Luis Puig
2nd Seraing-Aachen-Seraing
5th Grand Prix de Wallonie
8th Overall Vuelta a Mallorca
9th Overall Tour of Austria
1997
1st Overall ZLM Tour
7th Overall Tour of Austria

=== Grand Tour general classification results timeline ===
Grand Tour	1991	1992	1993	1994	1995
Giro d'Italia	—	—	—	—	—
Tour de France	—	14	45	—	45
Vuelta a España	41	—	—	—	27

Legend
—	Did not compete
DNF	Did not finish
