= Dimitri Zhdanov =

Russian cyclist

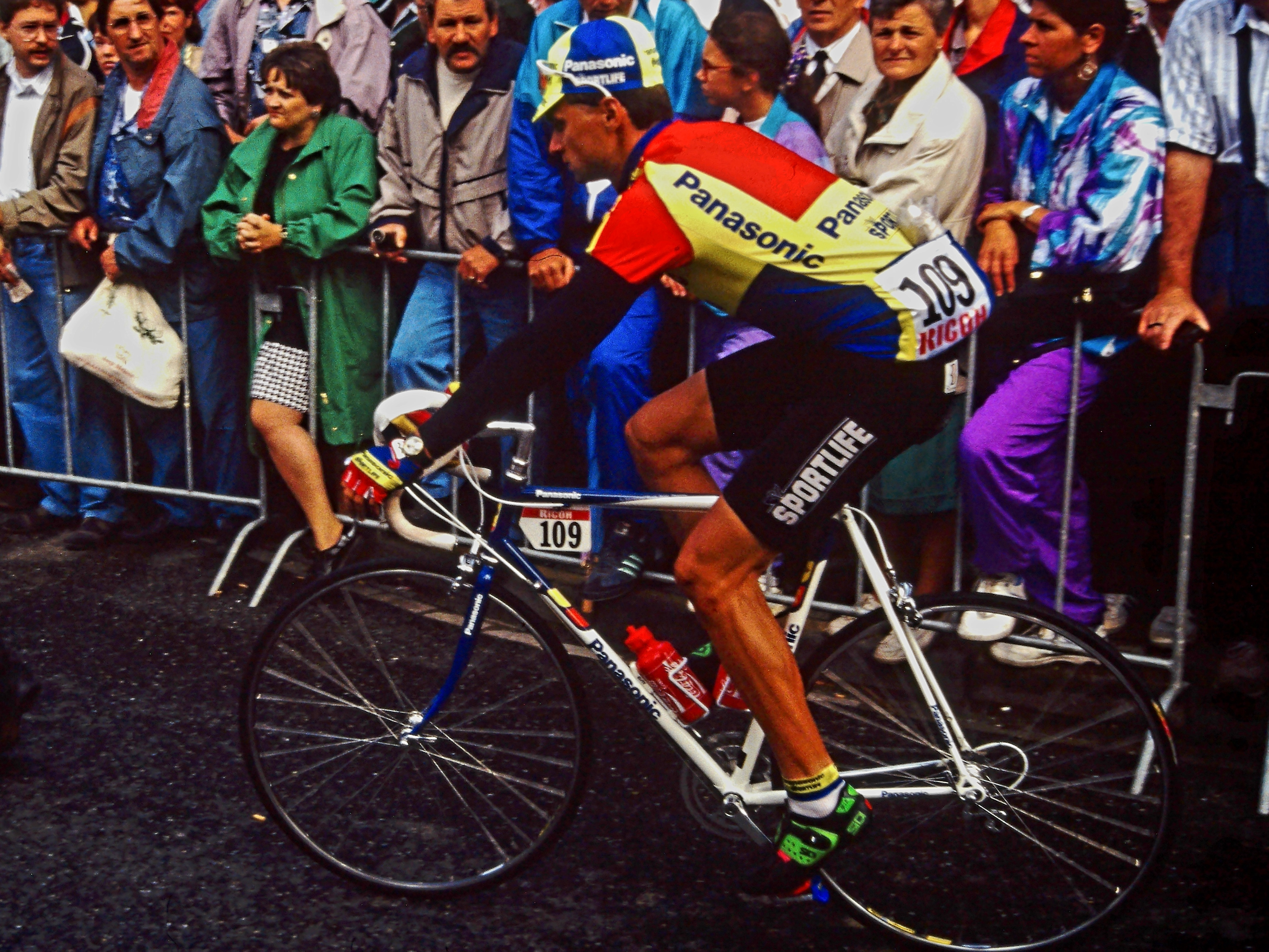
- Zhdanov (1992)

Personal information
- Born: 14 October 1969 (age 57) Moscow, Soviet Union

Cycling career
- Sport: Cycling
- Current team: Retired
- Discipline: Road
- Role: Rider

Professional teams
- 1991–1992: Panasonic–Sportlife
- 1993: Novemail–Histor–Laser Computer
- 1994: Team Polti–Vaporetto
- 1995: Sputnik–Soi
- 1998: Lokosphinx

Dimitri Zhdanov (born 14 October 1969) is a Russian former professional racing cyclist. He rode in four editions of the Tour de France.

== Major results ==
1987
1st Team time trial, UCI Junior Road World Championships
1988
1st Overall Vuelta a Navarra
1st Stage 1a Vuelta al Táchira
3rd Overall Vuelta a Cantabria
5th Overall Circuit Cycliste Sarthe
1989
2nd Overall Circuit Franco Belge

1st Stage 5a (ITT)

1990
1st Overall Circuit Cycliste Sarthe

1st Stage 4a

1st Overall Tour de Normandie

1st Stages 3a & 3b

1st Overall Tour of Sweden

1st Stage 5a (ITT)

1st Overall Redlands Bicycle Classic
1st Stage 3
1st Stage 11 Ruta Mexico
4th Overall Tour DuPont
1991
6th Overall Critérium International
6th Overall 4 Jours de Dunkerque
8th Overall Ronde van Nederland
1992
1st Trofeo Pantalica
1st Stage 4 (TTT) Tour de France
7th Overall Vuelta a Murcia
7th Overall Ronde van Nederland
1993
1st Tour de Vendée
2nd GP de Fourmies
7th Overall Tour de Suisse
9th Overall Vuelta a Andalucía

=== Grand Tour general classification results timeline ===
Grand Tour	1991	1992	1993	1994
Vuelta a España	—	—	—	—
Giro d'Italia	—	—	—	DNF
Tour de France	86	38	39	72

Legend
—	Did not compete
DNF	Did not finish
