= 1993 Vuelta a Murcia =

Race details
- Dates: 9–14 March 1993
- Stages: 6
- Distance: 774.3 km (481.1 mi)
- Winning time: 20h 28' 16"

Results
	Winner	Carlos Galarreta (ESP)
	Second	Laudelino Cubino (ESP)
	Third	Eddy Bouwmans (NED)

The 1993 Vuelta a Murcia was the ninth edition of the Vuelta a Murcia cycle race and was held on 9 March to 14 March 1993. The race started and finished in Murcia. The race was won by Carlos Galarreta.

== General classification ==
Final general classification

Rank	Rider	Time
1	Carlos Galarreta (ESP)	20h 28' 16"
2	Laudelino Cubino (ESP)	+ 2"
3	Eddy Bouwmans (NED)	+ 12"
4	Julián Gorospe (ESP)	+ 17"
5	Eduardo Chozas (ESP)	+ 25"
6	Jon Unzaga (ESP)	+ 45"
7	Laurent Dufaux (SWI)	+ 49"
8	Neil Stephens (AUS)	+ 49"
9	Viatcheslav Ekimov (RUS)	+ 1' 00"
10	José Martín Farfán (COL)	+ 1' 05"
