= 1993 Tour de Suisse =

Race details
- Dates: 15–24 June 1993
- Stages: 10
- Distance: 1,721 km (1,069 mi)
- Winning time: 44h 23' 15"

Results
	Winner	Marco Saligari (ITA)	(Ariostea)
	Second	Rolf Järmann (SUI)	(Ariostea)
	Third	Fernando Escartín (ESP)	(CLAS–Cajastur)

The 1993 Tour de Suisse was the 57th edition of the Tour de Suisse cycle race and was held from 15 June to 24 June 1993. The race started in Affoltern am Albis and finished in Zürich. The race was won by Marco Saligari of the Ariostea team.

== General classification ==
Final general classification

Rank	Rider	Team	Time
1	Marco Saligari (ITA)	Ariostea	44h 23' 15"
2	Rolf Järmann (SUI)	Ariostea	+ 2' 17"
3	Fernando Escartín (ESP)	CLAS–Cajastur	+ 2' 24"
4	Eddy Bouwmans (NED)	Novemail–Histor–Laser Computer	+ 2' 59"
5	Pavel Tonkov (RUS)	Lampre–Polti	+ 3' 06"
6	Felice Puttini (SUI)	Mecair–Ballan	+ 3' 31"
7	Dimitri Zhdanov (RUS)	Novemail–Histor–Laser Computer	+ 3' 35"
8	Davide Rebellin (ITA)	GB–MG Maglificio	+ 3' 36"
9	Beat Zberg (SUI)	Carrera Jeans–Tassoni	+ 4' 02"
10	Scott Sunderland (AUS)	TVM–Bison Kit	+ 4' 45"
