= Classique des Alpes =

Race details
- Date: Early June
- Region: Savoy, France
- English name: Classic of the Alps
- Local name: Classique des Alpes Élites (in French)
- Discipline: Road
- Type: One-day
- Organiser: ASO
- Web site: www.letour.fr/fr/homepage_horscourseCAJ.html

History
- First edition: 1991
- Editions: 14
- Final edition: 2004
- First winner: Charly Mottet (FRA)
- Most wins: Laurent Jalabert (FRA) (2 wins)
- Final winner: Óscar Pereiro (ESP)

Classique des Alpes was a classic taking place as a mountainous single-day cycling race. It took place in Chartreuse Mountains, beginning in Chambéry and finishing in Aix-les-Bains.

It was held between 1991 and 2004, a day before the start of the Critérium du Dauphiné Libéré. Following the 2004 edition, Jean-Marie Leblanc, head of the organising body the Amaury Sport Organisation, announced the race would no longer take place as the cycling teams were not supportive of the race. Charly Mottet, the first winner of the race, said that the race would have been more successful in August, following the Tour de France, as the climbing specialists would have been in form.

In 1995, a junior version of the Classique des Alpes was organised, which was continued after the senior version was cancelled.

== Elite race winners ==
Year	Country	Rider	Team
1991	France	Charly Mottet	
1992	France	Gilles Delion	
1993	Netherlands	Eddy Bouwmans	Novemail–Histor–Laser Computer
1994	Colombia	Oliverio Rincón	
1995	Spain	Ramón González Arrieta	
1996	France	Laurent Jalabert	
1997	France	Laurent Roux	
1998	France	Laurent Jalabert	
1999	Spain	Unai Osa	
2000	Spain	José María Jiménez	
2001	Spain	Iban Mayo	
2002	Colombia	Santiago Botero	
2003	Spain	Francisco Mancebo	
2004	Spain	Óscar Pereiro	

== Junior race winners ==
Year	Country	Rider	Team
1995	France	Grégory Lapalud	
1996	France	Loïc Lamouller	
1997	Netherlands	Roel Egelmeers	
1998	France	Julien Laidoun	
1999	Netherlands	Pieter Weening	
2000	France	Mikael Malle	
2001	Netherlands	Marc de Maar	
2002	France	Florian Vachon	
2003	France	Julien Loubet	
2004	Belgium	Pieter Jacobs	
2005	Moldova	Alexandre Pliușchin	
2006	Belgium	Jan Ghyselinck	
2007	France	Fabien Taillefer	
2008	France	Johan Le Bon	
2009	Belgium	Tim Wellens	
2010	France	Alexis Dulin	
2011	France	Pierre-Roger Latour	
