= Stefano Cortinovis =

Italian cyclist

Personal information
- Born: 25 May 1968 (age 58)

Cycling career
- Sport: Cycling
- Role: Rider

Stefano Cortinovis (born 25 May 1968) is an Italian racing cyclist. He rode in the 1993 Tour de France.
