= Jesper Skibby =

Danish cyclist (born 1964)

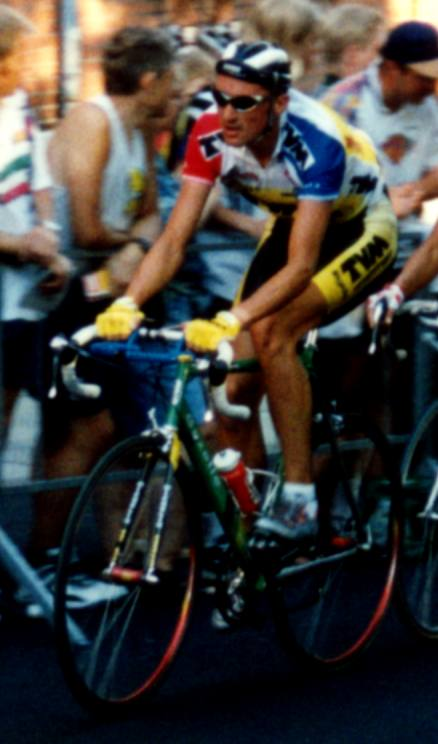

Personal information
- Full name: Jesper Skibby
- Born: 21 March 1964 (age 62) Silkeborg, Denmark

Cycling career
- Sport: Cycling
- Discipline: Road
- Role: Rider

Professional teams
- 1986-1988: Roland Cycling Team
- 1989-1997: TVM
- 1998-2000: Memory Card-Jack & Jones

Major wins
- Grand Tours Tour de France 1 individual stage (1993) Giro d'Italia 1 individual stage (1989) Vuelta a España 3 individual stages (1991, 1995)

Jesper Skibby (born 21 March 1964) is a retired professional road racing cyclist. He won at least one stage at each of the major tours. He was one of the most popular in Denmark, not only because of his talent, but also because of his wit and his constant banter. He rode for the Dutch TVM from 1989 to 1997, but switched to the Danish team Team home - Jack & Jones in 1998, where he ended his active career in 2000.

== Professional career ==
He participated in Tour de France 11 times, completed it 8 times, and won stage 5 between Avranches and Évreux in 1993. He is one of the relatively few riders to have won stages in all three major tours (Tour de France, Giro d'Italia and Vuelta a España). In March 1993 Skibby suffered a double fracture of the skull during a crash in the bunch sprint of stage 5 of Tirreno–Adriatico, however he made a remarkable recovery and was back racing later that year.

Skibby won the Tour of Holland stage race in 1994 after an epic breakaway on the last stage, as well as numerous individual stages in other races. In the 1987 Tour of Flanders, he was leading the race when his bike got driven over by a race director car climbing the Koppenberg, resulting in a deformed wheel. As a result, the Koppenberg got taken out of the route of the Tour of Flanders for 17 years before returning in 2004 with improved rider safety.

== Personal life ==
In 2005 he participated in the television show Vild Med Dans (Dancing with the Stars).

In August 2013 he participated in the television show Doping Epidemien (Doping Epidemics) where he told about the consequences of using doping for more than 10 years.

His sister is Olympic cyclist Karina Skibby and his father is Olympic cyclist Willy Skibby.

== Doping ==
In November 2006, he released his autobiography, in which he confesses to having used doping for more than 10 years. In 1991 he started using steroids, in 1992 growth hormones and testosterone, and in 1993 he was also using EPO. He claims that he requested the drugs himself, and he does not name any other riders or contacts in the book.

== Major results ==
1986
3rd Trofeo Baracchi
5th Grand Prix of Aargau Canton
1987
1st Stage 1b Danmark Rundt
9th Overall Tour Méditerranéen
9th Scheldeprijs
1988
1st Stage 5a Danmark Rundt
2nd Grand Prix de la Libération
4th Grand Prix Pino Cerami
1989
1st Grand Prix de la Libération
1st Stage 19 Giro d'Italia
4th Overall Tirreno–Adriatico
1990
Tour de la Communauté Européenne

1st Stages 3 & 10 (ITT)

7th Milan–San Remo
7th Paris–Brussels
10th Grand Prix of Aargau Canton
1991
Vuelta a España

1st Stage 3 & 7

2nd Overall Vuelta a Andalucía
5th Overall Ronde van Nederland
6th Overall Tirreno–Adriatico

1st Stage 7

6th Grand Prix Pino Cerami
7th Overall Tour de Luxembourg
7th Tour of Flanders
1992
2nd Trofeo Luis Puig
8th Tour of Flanders
1993
1st Stage 5 Tour de France
2nd Wincanton Classic
4th Giro di Campania
6th Giro di Lombardia
7th Overall Ronde van Nederland

1st Stage 5

9th Overall Tour Méditerranéen
9th Paris–Tours
1994
1st Overall Ronde van Nederland

1st Stage 5

1st Stage 4 Tirreno–Adriatico
Vuelta Asturias

1st Stages 1 & 6

5th Grote Prijs Jef Scherens
5th Coppa Sabatini
6th Brabantse Pijl
1995
1st Stage 9 Vuelta a España
Danmark Rundt

1st Stages 2 & 5

5th Amstel Gold Race
6th Tour of Flanders
9th Milan–San Remo
1996
3rd Road race, National Road Championships
3rd Clásica de Almería
6th Overall Danmark Rundt

1st Stage 4a

7th Coppa Sabatini
7th Coppa Placci
10th Overall Ronde van Nederland
1997
3rd Overall Danmark Rundt
1998
1st Omloop der Vlaamse Ardennen
1999
1st Circuito de Getxo
1st Stage 5 Tour de Luxembourg
2nd Time trial, National Road Championships
2nd Overall Tour Down Under
2nd Overall Tour of Sweden

1st Stage 3

2nd Grand Prix Eddy Merckx (with Marc Streel)
4th Overall Tour du Limousin
7th GP Herning
2000
7th Brabantse Pijl

=== Grand Tour general classification results timeline ===
Grand Tour	1987	1988	1989	1990	1991	1992	1993	1994	1995	1996	1997	1998	1999	2000
Giro d'Italia	—	—	14	—	—	—	—	—	DNF	DNF	—	—	—	—
Tour de France	29	—	41	DNF	DNF	56	53	45	49	29	82	—	—	DNF
/ Vuelta a España	—	—	—	—	28	DNF	—	DNF	48	DNF	DNF	—	—	—

Legend
—	Did not compete
DNF	Did not finish

== See also ==
- List of sportspeople sanctioned for doping offences
- List of doping cases in cycling
