= Tom Cordes =

Dutch cyclist (born 1966)

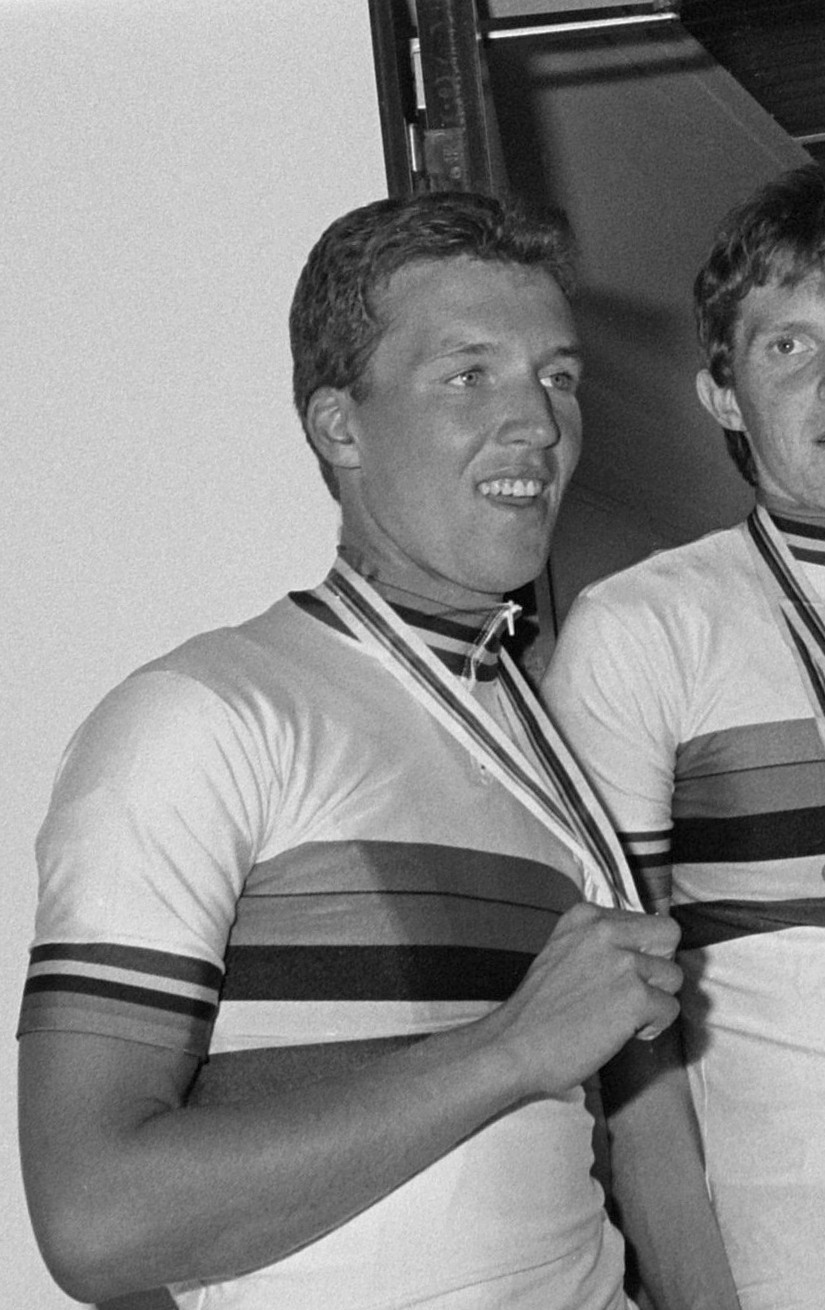
- Cordes in 1986

Personal information
- Full name: Thomas Matthijs Adrianus Cordes
- Born: 30 May 1966 (age 60) Wilnis, Netherlands
- Height: 1.79 m (5 ft 10 in)
- Weight: 70 kg (154 lb)

Cycling career
- Sport: Cycling
- Current team: Retired
- Discipline: Road
- Role: Rider

Amateur teams
- 1998: Tegeltoko
- 1999–2000: Piels–Timmers
- 2001–2005: Cyclingteam Bert Story–Piels

Professional teams
- 1989–1990: Superconfex–Yoko–Opel–Colnago
- 1991–1992: PDM–Concorde–Ultima
- 1993: Amaya Seguros
- 1994: WordPerfect–Colnago–Decca
- 1995: Asfra Racing Team–Orlans–Blaze
- 1995–1996: Castellblanch

Major wins
- Grand Tours Vuelta a España 1 individual stage (1992)
Medal record
Representing the Netherlands
UCI Road World Championships
Gold medal – first place	1986 Colorado Springs	Team time trial
Gold medal – first place	1984 Beuvron	Junior road race

Thomas Matthijs Adrianus Cordes (born 30 May 1966) is a retired Dutch cyclist. He competed at the 1988 Summer Olympics in the individual road race and 100 km team time trial and finished in 42nd and 11th place, respectively. During his career he won two world titles, in the road race (junior, 1985) and team time trial (senior, 1986). He also won the Hel van het Mergelland (1987), Ronde van Overijssel (1987) and Vuelta a Murcia (1990), as well as individual stages of the Tour de Pologne (1985), Tour of Sweden (1988), Tour of Galicia (1989), Volta a la Comunitat Valenciana (1989), Vuelta a España (1992) and Olympia's Tour (1997, 1998, 1999).

== Major results ==
1984
1st Road race, UCI Junior Road World Championships
1985
1st Stage 7 Tour de Pologne
1986
1st Team time trial, UCI Road World Championships
1st Stage 2 Tour of Austria
1st Stage 3a Grand Prix François Faber
1987
1st Ronde van Overijssel
1st Hel van het Mergelland
1988
1st Prologue Tour of Sweden
7th Overall Tour of Hellas
1989
1st Stage 4 Tour of Galicia
1st Stage 2 Volta a la Comunitat Valenciana
5th Overall Tour of Sweden
1990
1st Overall Vuelta a Murcia

1st Stage 3a

1st Overall Volta a la Comunitat Valenciana
1st Trofeo Luis Puig
1st Trofeo Baracchi (with Rolf Gölz)
5th Overall Tour of the Basque Country
7th Druivenkoers Overijse
9th Overall Critérium International
10th Overall Vuelta a Asturias
1991
7th Overall Ronde van Nederland
9th Overall Vuelta a Aragón
1992
1st Stage 16 Vuelta a España
1993
5th Overall Vuelta a Andalucía
6th Overall Vuelta a Aragón
9th Overall Ronde van Nederland
1994
9th Overall Ronde van Nederland
1995
5th Time trial, National Road Championships
1997
1st Stage 6 Olympia's Tour
1998
1st Stage 1 Olympia's Tour
1999
1st Prologue Olympia's Tour
5th Time trial, National Road Championships
6th Ronde van Noord-Holland
2001
1st Groningen–Münster

== See also ==
- List of Dutch Olympic cyclists
