= Michele Paletti =

Italian cyclist

Personal information
- Born: 1 August 1967 (age 59)

Cycling career
- Sport: Cycling
- Role: Rider

Michele Paletti (born 1 August 1967) is an Italian racing cyclist. He rode in the 1993 Tour de France.
