= Mario Mantovan =

Italian cyclist

Personal information
- Born: 8 May 1965 (age 61) Mariano Comense, Italy

Cycling career
- Sport: Cycling
- Role: Rider

Mario Mantovan (born 8 May 1965) is an Italian former professional racing cyclist. He rode in the 1993 and 1994 Tour de France.

During his amateur career, in 1989, Mario Mantovan won the Coppa d'Inverno, one of the main races on the Italian amateur calendar. He turned professional in 1991 with the ZG Mobili team and participated in his first Giro d'Italia that same year. He finished in 94th position, securing a second place on stage 8, where he lost the sprint to Davide Cassani.
