= Oleg Kozlitine =

Kazakhstani cyclist

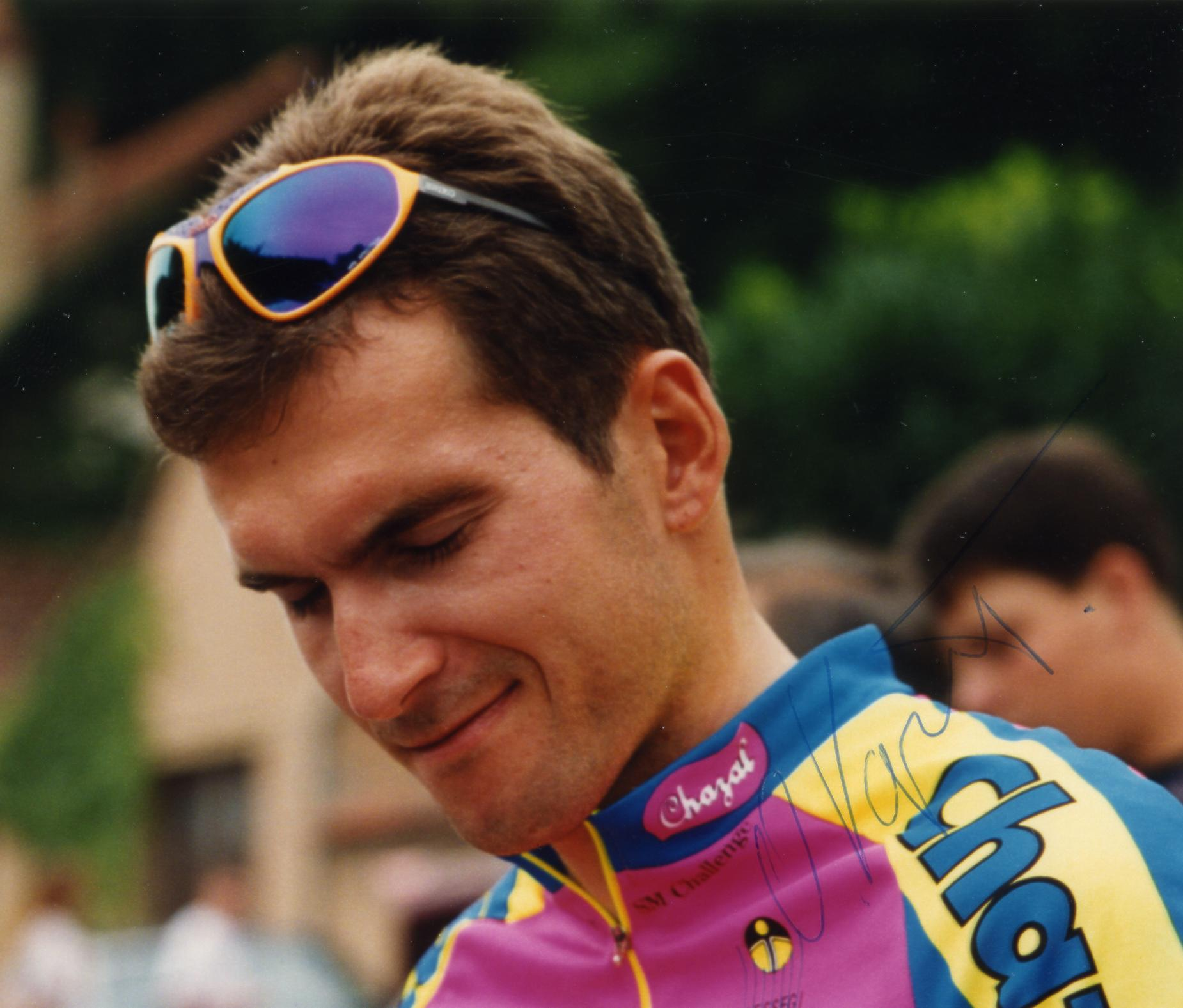

Personal information
- Born: September 2, 1969 (age 57) Krasnoyarsk, Soviet Union

Cycling career
- Sport: Cycling
- Current team: Retired
- Discipline: Road
- Role: Rider

Amateur team
- 1992: Chazal–Vanille et Mûre (stagiaire)

Professional teams
- 1993–1994: Chazal–Vetta–MBK
- 1995: Le Groupement
- 1996: Lotto
- 1997: Cédico–Ville de Charleroi
- 1999–2001: Saint-Quentin–Oktos–MBK

Oleg Kozlitine (born September 22, 1969) is a Kazakh former professional racing cyclist. He rode in the 1993 and 1996 Tour de France, but did not finish either.

== Major results ==
1990
2nd Volta a Lleida
1993
1st Paris–Camembert
9th Grand Prix de Wallonie
1998
1st Grand Prix des Flandres Françaises
1999
1st Stage 3 Tour de Bretagne Cycliste
1st Stage 4 Tour du Loir-et-Cher
4th Overall Tour de Normandie
