= 1993 Vuelta a Andalucía =

Race details
- Dates: 2–7 February 1993
- Stages: 6
- Distance: 731 km (454.2 mi)
- Winning time: 20h 48' 03"

Results
	Winner	Julián Gorospe (ESP)
	Second	Edwig Van Hooydonck (BEL)
	Third	Neil Stephens (AUS)

The 1993 Vuelta a Andalucía was the 39th edition of the Vuelta a Andalucía cycle race and was held on 2 February to 7 February 1993. The race started in Chiclana and finished in Granada. The race was won by Julián Gorospe.

== General classification ==
Final general classification

Rank	Rider	Time
1	Julián Gorospe (ESP)	20h 48' 03"
2	Edwig Van Hooydonck (BEL)	+ 1"
3	Neil Stephens (AUS)	+ 1"
4	Aitor Garmendia (ESP)	+ 3"
5	Tom Cordes (NED)	+ 5"
6	Francisco Cabello (ESP)	+ 12"
7	Antonio Sanchez Garcia (ESP)	+ 18"
8	Juan Rodrigo Arenas (ESP)	+ 19"
9	Dimitri Zhdanov (RUS)	+ 23"
10	José Luis Villanueva (ESP)	+ 23"
