= Jean-Pierre Delphis =

French cyclist (born 1969)

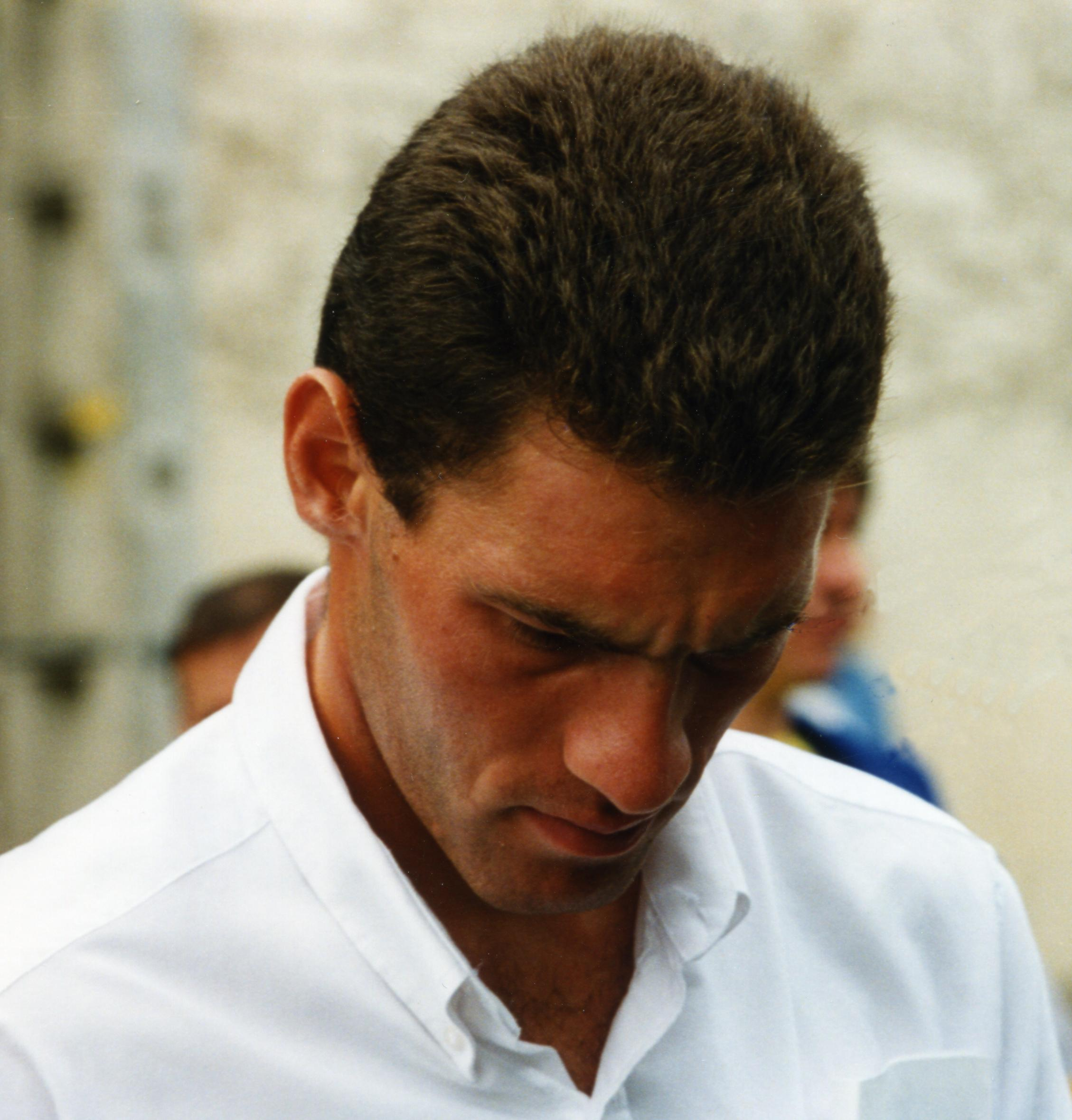

Personal information
- Born: 12 January 1969 (age 57) Aix-les-Bains, France

Cycling career
- Sport: Cycling
- Current team: Retired
- Discipline: Road
- Role: Rider

Professional teams
- 1992-1994: Chazal
- 1995: Univag-Condor-Blacky
- 1996: Aki-Gipiemme

Jean-Pierre Delphis (born 12 January 1969) is a former French racing cyclist. He rode in the 1993 Tour de France, finishing in 108th place.
