= Jean-Philippe Dojwa =

French cyclist

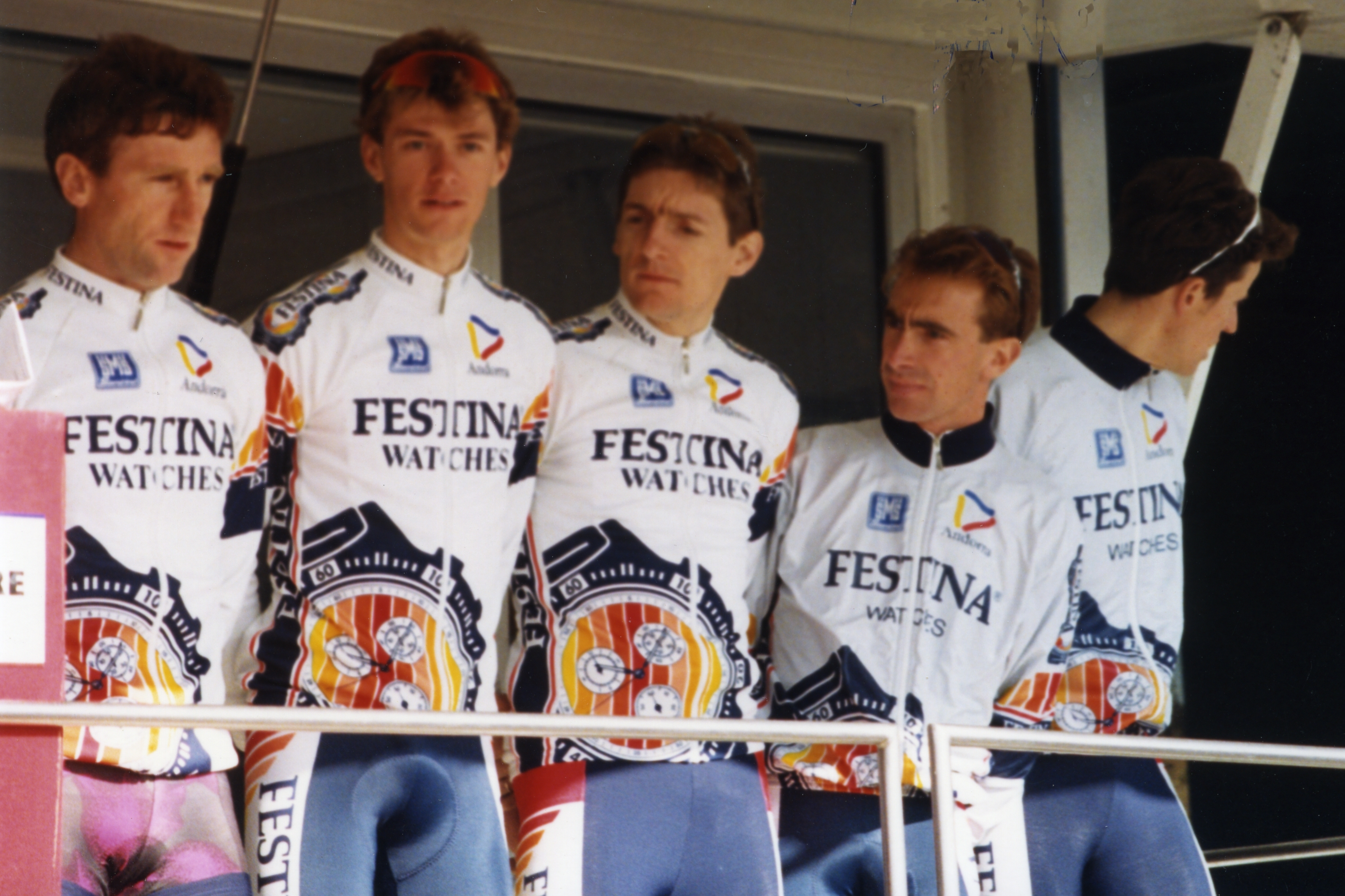
- Dojwa is second from right

Personal information
- Born: 7 August 1967 (age 59) Elbeuf, France
- Height: 1.73 m (5 ft 8 in)
- Weight: 58 kg (128 lb; 9 st 2 lb)

Cycling career
- Sport: Cycling
- Current team: Retired
- Discipline: Road
- Role: Rider

Amateur team
- 1990: VC Vaulx en Velin

Professional teams
- 1991–1992: RMO
- 1993: Festina–Lotus
- 1994–1995: GAN
- 1996: Aki–Gipiemme
- 1997–1998: Mutuelle de Seine-et-Marne

Jean-Philippe Dojwa (born 7 August 1967) is a French former cyclist. He finished fifteenth in the 1993 Tour de France.

== Major results ==
1990
1st Overall Route de France

1st Stage 4

5th Overall Tour du Limousin
1991
3rd Overall Circuit de la Sarthe
5th Overall Route du Sud
1992
1st Overall Tour de Luxembourg
1st Côte Picarde
1st Bordeaux–Caudéran
2nd Overall Tour de l'Avenir

1st Stage 3 (TTT)

3rd Duo Normand (with Marcel Wüst)
5th Road race, National Road Championships
1993
2nd Polynormande
4th Overall Critérium du Dauphiné Libéré
5th Overall Tour du Limousin
9th Overall Tour d'Armorique

=== Grand Tour results ===
Source:

=== Tour de France ===
- 1993: 15th
- 1994: DNF
- 1997: DNF

=== Vuelta a España ===
- 1991: DNF
