= Ronan Pensec =

French cyclist

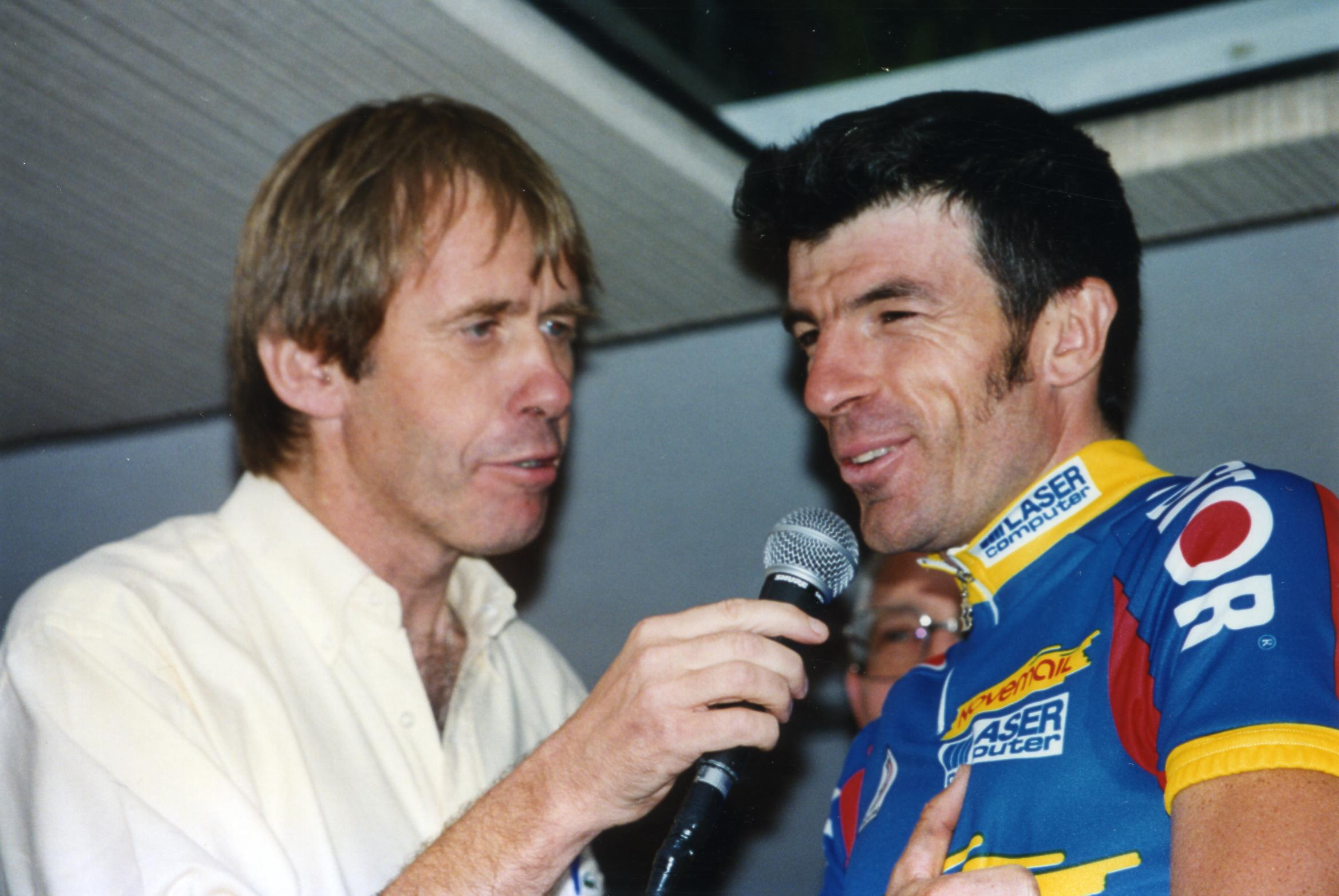

Personal information
- Full name: Ronan Pensec
- Nickname: Pinpin
- Born: 10 July 1963 (age 63) Douarnenez, France

Cycling career
- Sport: Cycling
- Current team: Retired
- Discipline: Road
- Role: Rider
- Rider type: Climber

Professional teams
- 1985-1986: Peugeot-Shell-Michelin
- 1987-1989: Z-Peugeot
- 1990: Z
- 1991: Amaya Seguros
- 1992: R.M.O.
- 1993-1994: Novemail–Histor–Laser Computer
- 1995: Le Groupement
- 1996-1997: GAN

Major wins
- Étoile de Bessèges 1987; Grand Prix des Rennes 1988; GP Ouest-France 1992

Ronan Pensec (born 10 July 1963) is a former French professional road bicycle racer. He was professional from 1985 to 1997.

== Racing career ==
Pensec was born in Douarnenez, Finistère, France. He became professional in 1985 with the Peugeot cycling team. His best performances in the Tour de France were in the first editions he competed in, where he finished sixth in the 1986 edition and seventh in the 1988 Tour de France. Pensec continued his career, still under Roger Legeay's guidance, with the Z team with Greg LeMond as his leader, who later became one of his best friends in the peloton. In the 1990 Tour de France Pensec wore the yellow jersey. While he defended his lead on the Alpe d'Huez, Pensec lost the lead to Italian Claudio Chiappucci in an Individual time trial. Pensec retired in 1997 after riding the French national championships.

== Charitable efforts ==
In 1994 he created the cycling event called La Ronan Pensec which is an event that raises money for AIDS research and AIDS fighting organisations. The operation also financially contributed to educate young high school students. Over the years, Ronan Pensec donated €350,000 to various associations.

== Media and other work ==
Pensec is now a television commentator and consultant for France Télévision on major cycling events. He gives the producer tactical advice on which live images he should select. In 2003, he founded his own travel agency.

== Major results ==
1985
1st place overall Étoile des Espoirs
1986
Lamballe
Meymac
Saint-Martin de Landelles
Villeneuve-sur-Yonne
Tour de France:

6th place overall classification

1987
Lanarvily (Cyclo-cross)
Étoile de Bessèges
1988
Callac
Route du Sud
Grand Prix de Rennes
Tour de France:

7th place overall classification

1989
Angers
1990
Boucles de l'Aulne
Lèves
Ronde d'Aix-en-Provence
Tour de France:

Wearing yellow jersey for two days

1992
Brest
GP Ouest-France
Monmarault
