= 1994 Tour of Slovenia =

Amateur International race

Race details
- Dates: 8–15 May 1994
- Stages: 9 + Criterium
- Distance: 942.5 km (585.6 mi)
- Winning time: 24h 23' 49"

Results
Jersey awarded to the overall winner	Winner	(Germany) Tobias Steinhauser
	Second	(Slovenia) Boris Premužič
	Third	(Slovenia) Sandi Papež
Jersey awarded to the points classification winner	Points	(Germany) Tobias Steinhauser
Jersey awarded to the mountains classification winner	Mountains	(Germany) Tobias Steinhauser
Jersey awarded to the youth classification winner	Youth	(Slovenia) Branko Filip
Jersey awarded to the sprints classification winner	Sprints	(Slovenia) Gorazd Štangelj
	Team	Slovenia

The 1994 Tour of Slovenia (Slovene: Dirka po Sloveniji) was the 2nd edition of the Tour of Slovenia, categorized as an amateur International stage race held between 8 and 15 May 1994.

The Tour started with three short stages (team time trial, criterium and knock out criterium) presentation day. The last event of three, eliminating criterim counted only of yellow jersey, not yet in general.

And the main race consisted of actual 9 stages with 942.5 km (585.6 mi) in total.

Tobias Steinhauser won the race with record 3 stages. He also won in points, mountains and stages classifications. Branko Filip was the best young rider and Slovenia took team classification.

== Teams ==
Total 123 riders (85 finished it) from 21 teams started the race.

=== Amateur ===
- (Slovenia) Rog
- (Slovenia) Krka
- (Slovenia) Sava
- (Slovenia) Savaprojekt (Krško)
- (Germany) RSV Histor Öschelbronn
- (Italy) MG Boys
- (Italy) Caneva

=== National ===
- Slovenia
- Kazakhstan
- Slovakia
- (Czech Republic) Czechia
- Ukraine
- Croatia
- Russia
- Belarus
- Bulgaria
- United States
- Poland
- Netherlands
- Albania
- Germany

== Route and stages ==
Stage characteristics and winners
Stage	Date	Course	Length	Type	Winner
0	8 May	Krško	2.6 km (2 mi)	Team time trial	Slovenia
0	8 May	Krško	6 x 1.3 km (1 mi)	Criterium	(Slovenia) Gorazd Štangelj
0	8 May	Krško	21 rounds	Eliminating Criterium	(Slovenia) Borut Rovšček
1	9 May	Otočec – Kamnik	167 km (104 mi)	Intermediate stage	(Kazakhstan) Dimitri Sedun
2	10 May	Otočec – Hrastnik	76 km (47 mi)	Flat stage	(Slovenia) Boštjan Mervar
3	10 May	Dol pri Hrastniku – Sveti Jurij na Gorah	7 km (4 mi)	Mountain time trial	(Germany) Tobias Steinhauser
4	11 May	Grosuplje – Idrija	154 km (96 mi)	Intermediate stage	(Germany) Mike Weissman
5	12 May	Novo mesto – Novo mesto	144 km (89 mi)	Hilly stage	(Germany) Lutz Lehmann
6	13 May	Ajdovščina – Predmeja – Ajdovščina	140 km (87 mi)	Mountain stage	(Germany) Tobias Steinhauser
7	14 may	Nova Gorica	40 km (25 mi)	Criterium	(Slovenia) Martin Hvastija
8	14 May	Nova Gorica – Vršič	104 km (65 mi)	Mountain stage	(Germany) Tobias Steinhauser
9	15 May	Orehovica – Orehovica	110.5 km (69 mi)	Flat stage	(Germany) Ralf Schmidt
Total		942.5 km (585.6 mi)			

== Classification leadership ==
Classification leadership by stage
Stage	Winner	General classification	Points classification	Mountains classification	Young rider classification	Intermediate sprints classification	Team classification
0	Borut Rovšček	Borut Rovšček	not available	not awarded	not available	Gorazd Štangelj	not awarded
1	Dimitri Sedun	Dimitri Sedun	not available	Dimitri Sedun	not available	Marko Baloh	not available
2	Boštjan Mervar	Dimitri Sedun	not available	not available	not available	not available	not available
3	Tobias Steinhauser	Tobias Steinhauser	not available	Sedun, Ravbar	not available	Marko Baloh	Slovenia
4	Mike Weissmann	Rodolfo Ongarato	not available	Bogdan Ravbar	not available	Kranjec & Lehmann	Slovenia
5	Jens Lehmann	Rodolfo Ongarato	not available	Bogdan Ravbar	not available	Jens Lehmann	Slovenia
6	Tobias Steinhauser	Sandi Papež	not available	not available	not available	not available	not available
7	Martin Hvastija	Sandi Papež	not available	not available	not available	not available	not available
8	Tobias Steinhauser	Tobias Steinhauser	not available	not available	not available	not available	not available
9	Ralf Schmidt	Tobias Steinhauser	Tobias Steinhauser	Tobias Steinhauser	Branko Filip	Jens Lehmann	Slovenia
Final		Tobias Steinhauser	Tobias Steinhauser	Tobias Steinhauser	Branko Filip	Jens Lehmann	Slovenia

== Final classification standings ==
Legend
Denotes the leader of the general classification	Denotes the leader of the mountains classification
Denotes the leader of the points classification	Denotes the leader of the young rider classification
Denotes the winner of the int. sprints classification	Denotes the leader of the team classification

=== General classification ===
Rank	Rider	Team	Time
1	(Germany) Tobias Steinhauser	Histor	24h 23' 49"
2	(Slovenia) Boris Premužič	Slovenia	+ 2' 24"
3	(Slovenia) Sandi Papež	Slovenia	+ 3' 18"
4	(Slovenia) Bogdan Ravbar	Krka	+ 4' 26"
5	(Kazakhstan) Dimitri Sedun	Kazakhstan	+ 5' 21"
6	(Slovenia) Igor Kranjec	Slovenia	+ 6' 03"
7	(Slovenia) Srečko Glivar	Krka	+ 6' 05"
8	(Germany) Mike Weissmann		+ 6' 48"
9	(Ukraine) Vladimir Douma	Ukraine	+ 7' 27"
10	(Slovenia) Branko Filip	Krka	+ 7' 57"

=== Points classification ===
Rank	Rider	Team	Points
1	(Germany) Tobias Steinhauser	Histor	81
2	(Germany) Lutz Lehmann	Germany	57
3	(Kazakhstan) Dimitri Sedun	Kazakhstan	55
4	(Slovenia) Igor Kranjec	Slovenia	54
5	(Slovenia) Bogdan Ravbar	Krka	50

=== Mountains classification ===
Rank	Rider	Team	Points
1	(Germany) Tobias Steinhauser	Histor	41
2	(Slovenia) Bogdan Ravbar	Krka	17
3	(Slovenia) Sandi Papež	Slovenia	15
4	(Slovenia) Srečko Glivar	Krka	14
5	(Italy) Federico Tozzo	MG Boys	6

=== Intermediate sprints classification ===
Rank	Rider	Team	Points
1	(Germany) Jens Lehmann	SC DHfK	22
2	(Slovenia) Igor Kranjec	Krka	14
3	(Italy) Denis Zanette	MG Boys	13
4	(Slovenia) Marko Baloh	Savaprojekt	11
5	(Kazakhstan) Dimitri Sedun	Kazakhstan	10

=== Young rider classification ===
Rank	Rider	Team	Time
1	(Slovenia) Branko Filip	Krka	24h 31' 46"
2	(Croatia) Vladimir Miholjević	Croatia	
3	(Ukraine) Čiptak	Ukraine	

=== Team classification ===
Rank	Team	Time
1	Slovenia	73h 21′ 45″
2	(Slovenia) Krka	+ 06′ 17″
3	Kazakhstan	+ 15′ 23″
4	Germany	+ 18′ 32″
5	Ukraine	+ 39′ 52″
...	...	...
7	(Slovenia) Rog	+ 1h 05′ 01″
9	(Slovenia) Sava	+ 1h 13′ 20″
14	(Slovenia) Savaprojekt	+ 1h 57′ 46″
