= 1993 Tour of Slovenia =

Amateur International race

Race details
- Dates: 3–9 May 1993
- Stages: 7 + Prologue
- Distance: 905.5 km (562.7 mi)
- Winning time: 22h 09' 58"

Results
Jersey awarded to the overall winner	Winner	(Slovenia) Boris Premužič
	Second	(Slovenia) Srečko Glivar
	Third	(Slovenia) Gorazd Štangelj
Jersey awarded to the points classification winner	Points	(Slovenia) Boštjan Mervar
Jersey awarded to the mountains classification winner	Mountains	(Italy) Gianluca Pianegonda
Jersey awarded to the youth classification winner	Youth	(Slovenia) Gorazd Štangelj
Jersey awarded to the sprints classification winner	Sprints	(Slovenia) Boštjan Mervar
	Team	Slovenia 1

The 1993 Tour of Slovenia (Slovene: Dirka po Sloveniji) was the first edition of the Tour of Slovenia, an amateur International stage race held between 3 and 9 May 1993 with start and finish in Novo mesto.

The Tour consisted of opening prologue and 7 actual stages with 905.5 km (562.7 mi) in total.

Total prize money was 40,000 deutsche marks. Race winner was awarded with a Škoda Favorit car.

Best Slovenian classification with pink jersey was exceptionally competed only in the first edition.

== Teams ==
Total 92 riders (56 finished it) from 16 teams started the race.

=== Amateur ===
- U. C. Trevigiani
- MTV La Campana
- Perspective
- RSV Oseh. Ali
- Breda Holl

=== National ===
- Slovenia 1
- Slovenia 2
- Krka - Petrol (Slovenia 3)
- Albania
- United States
- Slovakia
- Croatia
- Austria
- (Czech Republic) Czechia
- Poland
- Bulgaria

== Route and stages ==
Stage characteristics and winners
Stage	Date	Course	Length	Type		Winner
0	3 May	Novo mesto	5 km (3 mi)	Flat stage	Prologue	(Slovenia) Gorazd Štangelj
1	4 May	Otočec – Celje	189 km (117 mi)		Hilly stage	(Slovenia) Robert Pintarič
2	5 May	Rogaška Slatina – Ptuj	117 km (73 mi)		Flat stage	(Slovenia) Boštjan Mervar
3	6 May	Krško	46.2 km (29 mi)		Team time trial	Slovenia 1
4	6 May	Čatež Spa – Čatež Spa	80.3 km (50 mi)		Flat stage	(Netherlands) Robert Sienders
5	7 May	Otočec – Ljubljana	166 km (103 mi)		Hilly stage	(Italy) Mirko Crepaldi
6	8 May	Ajdovščina – Kranjska Gora	142 km (88 mi)		Mountain stage	(Netherlands) Wim van de Meulenhof
7	9 May	Novo mesto – Novo mesto	160 km		Flat stage	(Slovenia) Milan Eržen
Total		905.5 km (562.7 mi)				

== Race overview ==
=== Prologue ===
On 3 May 1993, the 5 km long prologue was held. Gorazd Štangelj won ahead of Robert Pintarič (2nd) and Martin Hvastija (3rd), all Slovenians.

=== Stage 1 ===
On 4 May 1993 first real and the longest stage of the race (189 km), was held between Otočec and Celje.

Robert Pintarič who won the stage, also took overall lead with wearing yellow jersey due to many bonus points.

=== Stage 2 ===
On 5 May 1993 second stage was held between Rogaška Slatina and Ptuj. In the sprint of peloton, Boštjan Mervar won the rainy stage.

=== Stage 3 & 4 ===
On 6 May 1993 two stages were held. First was team time trial (46.2 km) held in the morning in Krško, which didn't count for individual ranking.

And the 4th round stage (80.3 km) followed in the afternoon with start and finish at Čatež Spa, with two points and one mountain classifications.

=== Stage 5 ===
On 7 May 1993, the fifth stage (166 km) was held. It started at Otočec and through Metlika-Črnomelj-Dvor-Kočevje-Velike Lašče-Ljubljana.

The stage had three points classifications (Metlika, Črnomelj and Ribnica) and one mountain classification at Brezovica pri Metliki).

The stage was very chaotic with huge conflict between team directors and coaches, who forgot that national team interests have huge advantage before club interests. Instead of defending yellow jersey, peloton was strangely chasing Martin Hvastija, who was leading the two thirds of the race.

=== Stage 6 ===
On 8 May 1993, the sixth and the toughest stage (142 km) from Ajdovščina to Kranjska Gora was held. With 16 km long incline over Vršič Pass.

Stage started with escape if 3 riders with 6 minutes ahead, but got caught by peloton at bottom of the Vršič climb. Srečko Glivar was the best at climb with 2 minutes ahead, but was caught at way down to the finish at Kranjska Gora by 2 riders, Wim van de Meulenhof won the stage at finish sprint.

=== Stage 7 ===
On 9 May 1993, the seventh and last stage (160 km) with start and finish held at Novo mesto and went through Otočec, Orehovica and Ratež.

Slovenian rider Milan Eržen won the last stage at sprint and the Slovenia 1 team managed to kept the yellow jersey in general classification.

== Classification leadership ==
Classification leadership by stage
Stage	Winner	General classification	Points classification	Mountains classification	Young rider classification	Intermed. sprints classification	Best Slovenian classification	Team classification
0	Gorazd Štangelj	Gorazd Štangelj	Borut Rovšček	Martin Hvastija	Boštjan Mervar	Robert Pintarič	Marko Baloh	Slovenia 1
1	Robert Pintarič	Robert Pintarič	not available	Gianluca Pianegonda	not available	Boštjan Mervar	not available	Slovenia 1
2	Boštjan Mervar	Robert Pintarič	not available	Gianluca Pianegonda	not available	Boštjan Mervar	not available	Slovenia 1
3	Slovenia 1	Robert Pintarič	not available	Gianluca Pianegonda	not available	Boštjan Mervar	not available	Slovenia 1
4	Robert Sienders	Robert Pintarič	not available	Gianluca Pianegonda	not available	Boštjan Mervar	not available	Slovenia 1
5	Mirko Crepaldi	Martin Hvastija	not available	Gianluca Pianegonda	not available	Boštjan Mervar	not available	Slovenia 1
6	Wim van de Meulenhof	Boris Premužič	not available	Gianluca Pianegonda	not available	Boštjan Mervar	not available	Slovenia 1
7	Milan Eržen	Boris Premužič	Boštjan Mervar	Gianluca Pianegonda	Gorazd Štangelj	Boštjan Mervar	not available	Slovenia 1
Final		Boris Premužič	Boštjan Mervar	Gianluca Pianegonda	Gorazd Štangelj	Boštjan Mervar	not available	Slovenia 1

== Final classification standings ==
Legend
Denotes the leader of the general classification	Denotes the leader of the mountains classification
Denotes the leader of the points classification	Denotes the leader of the young rider classification
Denotes the winner of the int. sprints classification	Denotes the leader of the best Slovenian classification

=== General classification ===
Rank	Rider	Team	Time
1	(Slovenia) Boris Premužič	Slovenia 1	22h 9' 58"
2	(Slovenia) Srečko Glivar	Slovenia 2	+ 15"
3	(Slovenia) Gorazd Štangelj	Slovenia 1	+ 51"
4	(Netherlands) Wim van de Meulenhof		+ 1' 00"
5	(Slovenia) Robert Pintarič	Slovenia 1	+ 1' 09"
6	(Italy) Bolzan		+ 1' 51"
7	(Slovenia) Iztok Melanšek	Krka – Petrol	+ 1' 58"
8	(Czech Republic) Martin Slaník	Czechia	+ 1' 58"
9	(Slovenia) Martin Hvastija	Slovenia 2	+ 2' 17"
10	(Slovenia) Sandi Papež	Slovenia 1	+ 2' 50"

=== Points classification ===
Rank	Rider	Team	Points
1	(Slovenia) Boštjan Mervar	Slovenia 2	61
2	(Slovenia) Milan Eržen	Krka – Petrol	58
3	(Slovenia) Bogdan Fink	Slovenia 1	52
4	(Slovenia) Martin Hvastija	Slovenia 2	51
5	(Netherlands) Wim van de Meulenhof		48

=== Mountains classification ===
Rank	Rider	Team	Points
1	(Italy) Gianluca Pianegonda		21
2	(Slovenia) Boris Premužič	Slovenia 1	14
3	(Slovenia) Robert Pintarič	Slovenia 1	13
4	(Slovenia) Srečko Glivar	Slovenia 2	13
5	(Slovenia) Gorazd Štangelj	Slovenia 1	13

=== Young rider classification ===
Rank	Rider	Team	Time
1	(Slovenia) Gorazd Štangelj	Slovenia 1	22h 10' 49"
2	(Belarus) Sergej Aoutko	Belarus	
3	(Slovenia) Boštjan Mervar	Slovenia 2	+ 7' 52"
4	(Czech Republic) Kotal	Czechia	
5	(Poland) Kot	Poland	

=== Intermediate sprints classification ===
Rank	Rider	Team	Points
1	(Slovenia) Boštjan Mervar	Slovenia 2	20
2	(Slovenia) Milan Eržen	Krka – Petrol	14
3	(Slovenia) Gregor Puš	Krka – Petrol	11
4	(Slovenia) Martin Hvastija	Slovenia 2	7
5	(Slovenia) Brane Ugrenovič	Slovenia 2	6

=== Team classification ===
Rank	Team	Time
1	Slovenia 1	67h 10′ 43″
2	Slovenia 2	+ 09′ 03″
3	(Italy) Trevigiani	+ 21′ 04″
4	(Czech Republic) Czechia	+ 22′ 11″
5	Belarus	+ 23′ 09″
...	...	...
8	(Slovenia) Krka – Petrol	+ 31′ 14″
