= 1995 Tour of Slovenia =

Semi – Pro race

Race details
- Dates: 7–13 May 1995
- Stages: 7 + Criterium
- Distance: 982 km (610.2 mi)
- Winning time: 25h 34' 13"

Results
Jersey awarded to the overall winner	Winner	(Slovenia) Valter Bonča
	Second	(Slovenia) Boris Premužič
	Third	(Italy) Marco Antonio Di Renzo
Jersey awarded to the points classification winner	Points	(Italy) Luca Pavanello
Jersey awarded to the mountains classification winner	Mountains	(Italy) Marco Antonio Di Renzo
Jersey awarded to the youth classification winner	Youth	(Slovenia) Sergej Autko
Jersey awarded to the sprints classification winner	Sprints	(Denmark) Frank Høj
	Team	Italy

The 1995 Tour of Slovenia (Slovene: Dirka po Sloveniji) was the 2nd edition of the Tour of Slovenia, categorized as semi-professional International stage race held between 7 and 13 May 1995.

The Tour started with three short stages prologue (team time trial, criterium and knock out race). Those event counted only for yellow, blue, green and white jerseys, not yet for general classification.

And the main race consisted of actual 7 stages with 982 km (610.2 mi) in total.

== Teams ==
Total 118 riders (67 finished it) from 13 different countries and 20 teams started the race.

Professional clubs (teams) performed at the Tour of Slovenia for the first time.

=== Professional ===
- (Monaco) Aki–Gipiemme
- (Belgium) Collstrop–Lystex
- (Belgium) Rotan Spiessens–Hot Dog Louis

=== Amateur ===
- (Slovenia) Rog
- (Slovenia) Krka
- (Slovenia) Sava
- (Slovenia) Savaprojekt (Krško)
- (Slovenia) Celje
- (Germany) RSV Histor Öschelbronn
- (Italy) Caneva

=== National ===
- Slovenia (young)
- (Czech Republic) Czechia
- Belarus
- Croatia
- Finland
- Italy
- Kazakhstan
- Netherlands
- Russia
- Germany

== Route and stages ==
Stage characteristics and winners
Stage	Date	Course	Length	Type	Winner
0	7 May	Grosuplje	2.5 km (2 mi)	Team time trial	(Slovenia) Rog
0	7 May	Grosuplje	2.5 km (2 mi)	Criterium	(Italy) Marco Antonio Di Renzo
0	7 May	Grosuplje	2.5 km (2 mi)	Eliminating Criterium	(United States) Adam Laurent
1	8 May	Otočec – Kamnik	162 km (101 mi)	Intermediate stage	(Slovenia) Robert Pintarič
2	9 May	Krško – Impoljca – Krško	24 km (15 mi)	Time trial	(Slovenia) Robert Pintarič
3	9 May	Novo mesto – Novo mesto	72 km (45 mi)	Plain stage	(Italy) Luca Pavanello
4	10 May	Novo mesto – Portorož	197 km (122 mi)	Intermediate stage	(Denmark) Frank Høj
5	11 May	Portorož – Nova Gorica	177 km (110 mi)	Intermediate stage	(Slovenia) Boris Premužič
6	12 May	Nova Gorica – Kranj	178 km (111 mi)	Mountain stage	(Italy) Luca Pavanello
7	13 May	Otočec – Ljubljana	172 km (107 mi)	Hilly stage	(Slovenia) Branko Filip
Total		982 km (610.2 mi)			

== Classification leadership ==
Classification leadership by stage
Stage	Winner	General classification	Points classification	Mountains classification	Young rider classification	Intermediate sprints classification	Team classification
0	Adam Laurent	Adam Laurent	not available	Yevgeny Golovanov	Boštjan Mervar	Marco Di Renzo	not available
1	Robert Pintarič	Robert Pintarič	not available	Marco Di Renzo	not available	Robert Pintarič	not available
2	Robert Pintarič	Robert Pintarič	not available	Marco Di Renzo	Gorazd Štangelj	Robert Pintarič	not available
3	Luca Pavanello	Robert Pintarič	Marco Di Renzo	Thomas Fleischer	Gorazd Štangelj	Frank Høj	not available
4	Frank Høj	Robert Pintarič	Frank Høj	Thomas Fleischer	Gorazd Štangelj	Marco Di Renzo	not available
5	Boris Premužič	Valter Bonča	Robert Pintarič	Marco Di Renzo	Sergej Autko	Frank Høj	not available
6	Luca Pavanello	Valter Bonča	Luca Pavanello	Marco Di Renzo	Sergej Autko	Frank Høj	not available
7	Branko Filip	Valter Bonča	Luca Pavanello	Marco Di Renzo	Sergej Autko	Frank Høj	Italy
Final		Valter Bonča	Luca Pavanello	Marco Di Renzo	Sergej Autko	Frank Høj	Italy

== Final classification standings ==
Legend
Denotes the leader of the general classification	Denotes the leader of the mountains classification
Denotes the leader of the points classification	Denotes the leader of the young rider classification
Denotes the winner of the int. sprints classification	Denotes the leader of the team classification

=== General classification ===
Rank	Rider	Team	Time
1	(Slovenia) Valter Bonča	ZG Mobili (AKI Gipiemme)	25h 34' 13"
2	(Slovenia) Boris Premužič	Rog	+ 17"
3	(Italy) Marco Antonio Di Renzo	Italy	+ 1' 10"
4	(Italy) Lorenzo di Silvestro	Italy	+ 1' 42"
5	(Italy) Massimiliano Gentili	Italy	+ 1' 48"
6	(Slovenia) Sergej Autko	Celje	+ 2' 07"
7	(Germany) Thomas Fleischer	Collstrop	+ 2' 32"
8	(Italy) Valoti		+ 3' 45"
9	(Germany) Andreas Lebsanft	Germany	+ 3' 53"
10	(Czech Republic) Slavomir Heger	Czechia	+ 3' 56"

=== Points classification ===
Rank	Rider	Team	Points
1	(Italy) Luca Pavanello	Italy	
2	(Slovenia) Robert Pintarič	Rog	
3	(Italy) Marco Antonio Di Renzo	Italy	
4	(Slovenia) Boris Premužič	Rog	
5	(Denmark) Frank Høj	Collstrop	

=== Mountains classification ===
Rank	Rider	Team	Points
1	(Italy) Marco Antonio Di Renzo	Italy	
2	(Germany) Thomas Fleischer	Collstrop	
3	(Slovenia) Robert Pintarič	Rog	
4	(Italy) Gentili	Italy	
5	(Slovenia) Branko Filip	Slovenia Jr.	

=== Young rider classification ===
Rank	Rider	Team	Time
1	(Slovenia) Sergej Autko	Celje	25h 36' 20"

=== Intermediate sprints classification ===
Rank	Rider	Team	Points
1	(Denmark) Frank Høj	Collstrop	
2	(Slovenia) Robert Pintarič	Rog	
3	(Italy) Marco Antonio Di Renzo	Italy	
4	(Germany) Thomas Fleischer	Collstrop	
5	(Slovenia) Bogdan Ravbar	Savaprojekt	

=== Team classification ===
Rank	Team	Time
1	Italy	75h 15′ 53″
2	(Czech Republic) Czechia	+ 7′ 04″
3	(Belgium) Collstrop	+ 9′ 30″
4	(Monaco) AKI Gipiemme	+ 9′ 43″
5	(Slovenia) Rog	+ 12′ 44″
...	...	...
8	(Slovenia) Celje	+ 32′ 49″
9	(Slovenia) Krka	+ 41′ 40″
10	(Slovenia) Slovenija ml.	+ 47′ 55″
