= 1996 Tour of Slovenia =

UCI‑5 race

Race details
- Dates: 6–12 May 1996
- Stages: 7 + Criterium
- Distance: 983 km (610.8 mi)
- Winning time: 23h 24' 41"

Results
Jersey awarded to the overall winner	Winner	(Italy) Lorenzo Di Silvestro
	Second	(Italy) Stefano Giraldi
	Third	(Italy) Marco Antonio Di Renzo
Jersey awarded to the points classification winner	Points	(Italy) Lorenzo Di Silvestro
Jersey awarded to the mountains classification winner	Mountains	(Kazakhstan) Alexander Vinokourov
Jersey awarded to the youth classification winner	Youth	(Slovenia) Tadej Valjavec
Jersey awarded to the sprints classification winner	Sprints	(Kazakhstan) Alexander Vinokourov
	Team	(Italy) Cantina Tollo–Co.Bo.

The 1996 Tour of Slovenia (Slovene: Dirka po Sloveniji) was the 4th edition of the Tour of Slovenia, categorized as UCI‑5 stage race held between 6 and 12 May 1996.

Tha main and biggest Slovenian daily newspaper Delo, sponsored additional money awarded sprints classification. Winner took then 150 deutsche marks (DEM) for each stage sprint win.

The Tour started with three short stages prologue (team time trial, elimination race and criterium).

And the main race consisted of actual 7 stages with 983 km (610.8 mi) in total.

== Teams ==
Total 96 riders (72 finished it) from 10 different countries and 18 teams started the race.

=== Professional ===
- (Slovenia) Cantina Tollo–Co.Bo.
- (Italy) Glacial–Selle Italia

=== Amateur ===
- (Slovenia) Rog
- (Slovenia) Krka I
- (Slovenia) Krka II (Krka Telekom)
- (Slovenia) Sava
- (Germany) RSV Histor Öschelbronn
- (Germany) Cottbus
- (Czech Republic) Joko
- (Italy) Nardi
- (Federal Republic of Yugoslavia) Čukarički
- (Slovenia) Perutnina Ptuj

=== National ===
- Belarus (canceled)
- Bulgaria (canceled)
- Canada
- Kazakhstan
- Netherlands
- Slovakia

== Route and stages ==
Stage characteristics and winners
Stage	Date	Course	Length	Type	Winner
0	6 May	Ljubljana (BTC)	2.55 km (2 mi)	Team time trial	(Slovenia) Rog
0	6 May	Ljubljana (BTC)	12 rounds	Elimination race	(Italy) Marco Antonio Di Renzo
0	6 May	Ljubljana (BTC)		Criterium	(Kazakhstan) Alexander Vinokourov
1	7 May	Metlika – Metlika	161 km (100 mi)	Plain stage	(Italy) Stefano Giraldi
2	8 May	Podčetrtek – Radenci	149 km (93 mi)	Plain stage	(Italy) Marco Antonio Di Renzo
3	9 May	Radenci – Ljutomer	29 km (18 mi)	Time trial	(Slovenia) Robert Pintarič
4	9 May	Ljutomer – Beltinci	86 km (53 mi)	Plain stage	(Germany) Olaf Pollack
5	10 May	Beltinci – Grosuplje	220 km (137 mi)	Hilly stage	(Slovenia) Igor Kranjec
6	11 May	Vrhnika – Bovec	159 km (99 mi)	Mountain stage	(Italy) Lorenzo Di Silvestro
7	12 May	Nova Gorica – Novo mesto	179 km (111 mi)	Hilly stage	(Slovenia) Zoran Klemenčič
Total		983 km (610.8 mi)			

== Classification leadership ==
Classification leadership by stage
Stage	Winner	General classification	Points classification	Mountains classification	Young rider classification	Intermed. sprints classification	Delo's sprints classification	Team classification
0	Rog	Marco Di Renzo	Robert Pintarič	Matthias Jandt	not available	Alexander Vinokourov	Lorenzo Di Silvestro	Rog
1	Stefano Giraldi	Stefano Giraldi	not available	Stefano Giraldi	not available	Bedin	Bogdan Fink	Glacial–Selle Italia
2	Marco Di Renzo	Stefano Giraldi	not available	Stefano Giraldi	not available	Bedin	Bogdan Fink	Glacial–Selle Italia
3	Robert Pintarič	Stefano Giraldi	not available	not available	not available	not available	not awarded	not available
4	Olaf Pollack	Stefano Giraldi	not available	not available	not available	Bedin	not awarded	not available
5	Igor Kranjec	Stefano Giraldi	Marco Di Renzo	Stefano Giraldi	not available	Bedin	Alexander Vinokourov	not available
6	Lorenzo Di Silvestro	Lorenzo Di Silvestro	not available	not available	not available	not available	not available	not available
7	Zoran Klemenčič	Lorenzo Di Silvestro	Lorenzo Di Silvestro	Alexander Vinokourov	Tadej Valjavec	Alexander Vinokourov	Alexander Vinokourov	Cantina Tollo–Co.Bo.
Final		Lorenzo Di Silvestro	Lorenzo Di Silvestro	Alexander Vinokourov	Tadej Valjavec	Alexander Vinokourov	Alexander Vinokourov	Cantina Tollo–Co.Bo.

== Final classification standings ==
Legend
Denotes the leader of the general classification	Denotes the leader of the mountains classification
Denotes the leader of the points classification	Denotes the leader of the Delo's blue jersey classification
Denotes the winner of the int. sprints classification	Denotes the leader of the young rider classification

=== General classification ===
Rank	Rider	Team	Time
1	(Italy) Lorenzo Di Silvestro	Cantina Tollo-Co.Bo.	23h 24' 41"
2	(Italy) Stefano Giraldi	Selle Italia - Glacial	+ 2' 45"
3	(Italy) Marco Antonio Di Renzo	Cantina Tollo-Co.Bo.	+ 4' 37"
4	(Slovenia) Boris Premužič	Rog	+ 4' 38"
5	(Italy) Nicola Ramacciotti	Cantina Tollo-Co.Bo.	+ 5' 34"
6	(Slovenia) Iztok Melanšek	Perutnina Ptuj	+ 5' 36"
7	(Slovenia) Robert Pintarič	Rog	+ 5' 50"
8	(Slovenia) Martin Hvastija	Cantina Tollo-Co.Bo.	+ 5' 51"
9	(Slovenia) Tadej Valjavec	Sava	+ 6' 21"
10	(Italy) Stefano Toniazzo	Nardi	+ 6' 50"

=== Points classification ===
Rank	Rider	Team	Points
1	(Italy) Lorenzo DI Silvestro	Cantina Tollo-Co.Bo.	

=== Mountains classification ===
Rank	Rider	Team	Points
1	(Kazakhstan) Alexander Vinokurov	Kazahstan	18
2	(Italy) Lorenzo Di Silvestro	Cantina Tollo-Co.Bo.	16
3	(Kazakhstan) Andrej Kivilev	Kazahstan	12
4	(Italy) Stefano Giraldi	Selle Italia - Glacial	12
5	(Slovenia) Bogdan Ravbar	Krka	5

=== Young rider classification ===
Rank	Rider	Team	Time
1	(Slovenia) Tadej Valjavec	Sava Kranj	23h 31' 02"

=== Intermediate sprints classification ===
Rank	Rider	Team	Points
1	(Kazakhstan) Alexander Vinokourov	Kazahstan	24
2	(Kazakhstan) Andrej Kivilev	Kazakhstan	18
3	(Slovenia) Bogdan Fink	Krka	7
4	(Czech Republic) Michal Reif	Czechia	6
5	(Slovenia) Bogdan Ravbar	Krka	5

=== Delo's blue jersey sprints classification ===
Rank	Rider	Team	Points
1	(Kazakhstan) Alexander Vinokurov	Kazahstan	24
2	(Slovenia) Bogdan Fink	Krka	15
3	(Slovenia) Rajko Petek	Sava	13
4	(Slovenia) Bogdan Ravbar	Rog	8
5	(Italy) Marco Antonio Di Renzo	Cantina Tollo-Co.Bo.	6

=== Team classification ===
Rank	Team	Time
1	(Italy) Cantina Tollo-Co.Bo.	
2	(Italy) Selle Italia - Glacial	
3	(Slovenia) Rog	
4		
5		
...	...	...
6	(Slovenia) Krka I	
7	(Slovenia) Krka II	
