= Mrzlava Vas =

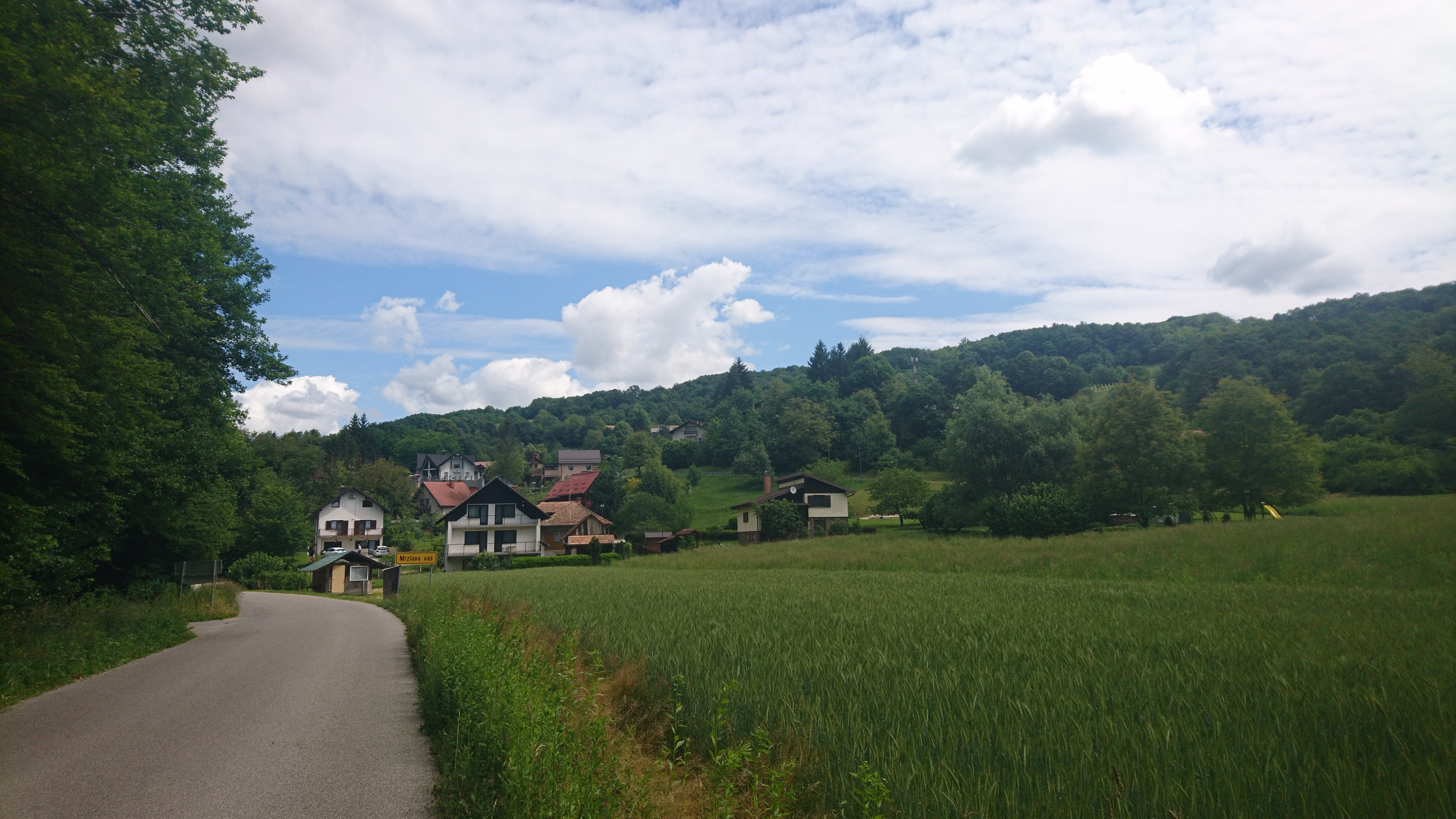

- Location in Slovenia
- Coordinates: 45°52′44.83″N 15°34′43.26″E
- Country: Slovenia
- Traditional region: Lower Carniola
- Statistical region: Lower Sava
- Municipality: Brežice

Area
  - Total: 2.13 km^{2} (0.82 sq mi)
- Elevation: 200.6 m (658 ft)

Population (2020)
  - Total: 172
  - Density: 80.8/km^{2} (209/sq mi)

Mrzlava Vas (pronounced [məɾˈzlaːʋa ˈʋaːs]; Slovene: Mrzlava vas) is a village in the hills above the right bank of the Krka River, in the Municipality of Brežice in eastern Slovenia. The area is part of the traditional region of Lower Carniola. It is now included in the Lower Sava Statistical Region.

The village church, built on an isolated location south of the main settlement, is dedicated to the Holy Spirit and belongs to the Parish of Čatež ob Savi. It was originally a medieval building, but was extensively rebuilt in 1864 when the belfry was also added.

Between 1920 and 1960 and in 1986 a number urn burials dating to the 1st and 2nd centuries were found and excavated in the area. Two Roman coins dating from the rule of Galba and Trajan were also found.
