= Vladimír Holeček =

Czech cycling official (1936–2026)

- Born: 28 March 1936
- Died: 27 March 2026 (aged 89)
- Occupations: Cycling official, track cyclist

Vladimír Holeček (28 March 1936 – 27 March 2026) was a Czech cycling official and former track cyclist. He was President of the Union Européenne de Cyclisme (UEC) from 2001 to 2009, and Vice President of the Union Cycliste Internationale (UCI) from 1997 to 2009.

== Cycling career ==
Holeček competed in track cycling and raced for the Czechoslovak national team from 1959 to 1961.

== Administrative career ==
After his cycling career, Holeček became a cycling official, first in the Prague Cycling Association and later as chairman of the Czechoslovak Cycling Federation from 1972 to 1976.

Holeček was one of the UEC's vice-presidents from 1990 until 2001, when he became president. He remained president until 2009.

In the UCI, he chaired the indoor cycling commission from 1981 to 2000. He joined the UCI Management Committee in 1993, and was the UCI vice-president from 1997 to 2009.

After leaving office, he held the titles of honorary president of the UEC and honorary vice president of the UCI.

After his death, the Czech Cycling Federation credited Holeček with involvement in the 1993 removal of the division between amateur and professional riders. It also credited him with supporting the integration of mountain biking and BMX into the UCI and the Olympic programme.

== Honours ==
In 2014, Holeček received the UEC Merit.

He was inducted into the Czech Cycling Hall of Fame in 2019.

In 2022, he received the UEC Gold Licence.

== Death ==
Vladimír Holeček died on 27 March 2026, one day before his 90th birthday.

A funeral service was held on 9 April 2026 at the Strašnice Crematorium in Prague.
