= 2020 Czech Cycling Tour =

2020 UCI Europe Tour

Race details
- Dates: 6–9 August 2020
- Stages: 4
- Distance: 594.4 km (369.3 mi)
- Winning time: 14h 44' 35"

Results
Jersey awarded to the overall winner	Winner	Damien Howson (AUS)	(Mitchelton–Scott)
	Second	Jack Bauer (NZL)	(Mitchelton–Scott)
	Third	Markus Hoelgaard (NOR)	(Uno-X Pro Cycling Team)
Jersey awarded to the points classification winner	Points	Jordi Meeus (BEL)	(SEG Racing Academy)
Jersey awarded to the mountains classification winner	Mountains	Koen Bouwman (NED)	(Team Jumbo–Visma)
Jersey awarded to the young rider classification winner	Young rider	Jakub Otruba (CZE)	(Elkov–Kasper)
	Team	Elkov–Kasper	

The 2020 Czech Cycling Tour was the 11th edition of the Czech Cycling Tour, between 6 and 9 August 2020. The race was rated as a 2.1 event as part of the 2020 UCI Europe Tour.

== Route ==
Stage characteristics and winners
Stage	Date	Route	Distance	Type	Winner
1	6 August	Uničov	18.6 km (11.6 mi)	Team time trial	Mitchelton–Scott
2	7 August	Prostějov to Uničov	193.4 km (120.2 mi)	Hilly stage	Jordi Meeus (BEL)
3	8 August	Olomouc to Frýdek-Místek	209.8 km (130.4 mi)	Hilly stage	Jordi Meeus (BEL)
4	9 August	Mohelnice to Šternberk	172.6 km (107.2 mi)	Intermediate stage	Damien Howson (AUS)
	Total		594.4 km (369.3 mi)		

== Teams ==
Twenty teams, consisting of six UCI WorldTeams, four UCI ProTeams, ten UCI Continental teams, and the Czech national team, participated in the race. Each team entered seven riders, except for Bahrain–McLaren, which entered six. 85 of the 147 riders that started the race finished.

UCI WorldTeams

- Mitchelton–Scott
- Bora–Hansgrohe
- Team Jumbo–Visma
- Team Sunweb
- NTT Pro Cycling
- Bahrain–McLaren

UCI ProTeams

- Alpecin–Fenix
- Bingoal–Wallonie Bruxelles
- Uno-X Pro Cycling Team
- Sport Vlaanderen–Baloise

UCI Continental Teams

- SEG Racing Academy
- Team Felbermayr–Simplon Wels
- Leopard Pro Cycling
- Metec–TKH
- Team Lotto–Kern Haus
- Swiss Racing Academy
- Maloja Pushbikers
- Adria Mobil
- Voster ATS Team
- Elkov–Kasper

National Teams

- Czech Republic

== Stages ==
=== Stage 1 ===
6 August 2020 — Uničov to Uničov, 18.6 km (11.6 mi)

Stage 1 Result
Rank	Team	Time
1	Mitchelton–Scott	19' 49"
2	Team Sunweb	+ 25"
3	Uno-X Pro Cycling Team	+ 25"
4	Elkov–Kasper	+ 28"
5	Bora–Hansgrohe	+ 31"
6	Team Jumbo–Visma	+ 34"
7	Alpecin–Fenix	+ 39"
8	Bahrain–McLaren	+ 43"
9	SEG Racing Academy	+ 45"
10	Sport Vlaanderen–Baloise	+ 59"

General classification after Stage 1
Rank	Rider	Team	Time
1	Luke Durbridge (AUS)	Mitchelton–Scott	19' 49"
2	Jack Bauer (NZL)	Mitchelton–Scott	+ 0"
3	Lucas Hamilton (AUS)	Mitchelton–Scott	+ 0"
4	Kaden Groves (AUS)	Mitchelton–Scott	+ 0"
5	Damien Howson (AUS)	Mitchelton–Scott	+ 0"
6	Joris Nieuwenhuis (NED)	Team Sunweb	+ 25"
7	Asbjørn Kragh Andersen (DEN)	Team Sunweb	+ 25"
8	Michael Storer (AUS)	Team Sunweb	+ 25"
9	Nico Denz (GER)	Team Sunweb	+ 25"
10	Felix Gall (AUT)	Team Sunweb	+ 25"

=== Stage 2 ===
7 August 2020 — Prostějov to Uničov, 193.4 km (120.2 mi)

Stage 2 Result
Rank	Rider	Team	Time
1	Jordi Meeus (BEL)	SEG Racing Academy	4h 41' 34"
2	Tim Merlier (BEL)	Alpecin–Fenix	+ 0"
3	Max Kanter (GER)	Team Sunweb	+ 0"
4	Olav Kooij (NED)	Team Jumbo–Visma	+ 0"
5	Sean De Bie (BEL)	Bingoal–Wallonie Bruxelles	+ 0"
6	Daniel Hoelgaard (NOR)	Uno-X Pro Cycling Team	+ 0"
7	Amaury Capiot (BEL)	Sport Vlaanderen–Baloise	+ 0"
8	Luke Durbridge (AUS)	Mitchelton–Scott	+ 0"
9	Dominik Neumann (CZE)	Elkov–Kasper	+ 0"
10	Erik Baška (SVK)	Bora–Hansgrohe	+ 0"

General classification after Stage 2
Rank	Rider	Team	Time
1	Luke Durbridge (AUS)	Mitchelton–Scott	5h 01' 23"
2	Kaden Groves (AUS)	Mitchelton–Scott	+ 0"
3	Lucas Hamilton (AUS)	Mitchelton–Scott	+ 0"
4	Damien Howson (AUS)	Mitchelton–Scott	+ 0"
5	Jack Bauer (NZL)	Mitchelton–Scott	+ 0"
6	Nico Denz (GER)	Team Sunweb	+ 22"
7	Niklas Larsen (DEN)	Uno-X Pro Cycling Team	+ 22"
8	Joris Nieuwenhuis (NED)	Team Sunweb	+ 24"
8	Anders Skaarseth (NOR)	Uno-X Pro Cycling Team	+ 24"
10	Markus Hoelgaard (NOR)	Uno-X Pro Cycling Team	+ 25"

=== Stage 3 ===
8 August 2020 — Olomouc to Frýdek-Místek, 209.8 km (130.4 mi)

Stage 3 Result
Rank	Rider	Team	Time
1	Jordi Meeus (BEL)	SEG Racing Academy	5h 18' 38"
2	Max Kanter (GER)	Team Sunweb	+ 0"
3	Martin Laas (EST)	Bora–Hansgrohe	+ 0"
4	Kenneth Van Rooy (BEL)	Sport Vlaanderen–Baloise	+ 0"
5	Amaury Capiot (BEL)	Sport Vlaanderen–Baloise	+ 0"
6	Pascal Eenkhoorn (NED)	Team Jumbo–Visma	+ 0"
7	Sean De Bie (BEL)	Bingoal–Wallonie Bruxelles	+ 0"
8	Markus Hoelgaard (NOR)	Uno-X Pro Cycling Team	+ 0"
9	Théry Schir (SUI)	Swiss Racing Academy	+ 0"
10	Tomáš Bárta (CZE)	Czech Republic	+ 0"

General classification after Stage 3
Rank	Rider	Team	Time
1	Kaden Groves (AUS)	Mitchelton–Scott	10h 20' 01"
2	Damien Howson (AUS)	Mitchelton–Scott	+ 0"
3	Lucas Hamilton (AUS)	Mitchelton–Scott	+ 0"
4	Jack Bauer (NZL)	Mitchelton–Scott	+ 0"
5	Nico Denz (GER)	Team Sunweb	+ 20"
6	Jordi Meeus (BEL)	SEG Racing Academy	+ 24"
7	Markus Hoelgaard (NOR)	Uno-X Pro Cycling Team	+ 25"
8	Chad Haga (USA)	Team Sunweb	+ 25"
9	Torstein Træen (NOR)	Uno-X Pro Cycling Team	+ 25"
10	Michael Storer (AUS)	Team Sunweb	+ 25"

=== Stage 4 ===
9 August 2020 — Mohelnice to Šternberk, 172.6 km (107.2 mi)

Stage 4 Result
Rank	Rider	Team	Time
1	Damien Howson (AUS)	Mitchelton–Scott	4h 24' 44"
2	Markus Hoelgaard (NOR)	Uno-X Pro Cycling Team	+ 0"
3	Adam Ťoupalík (CZE)	Elkov–Kasper	+ 9"
4	Pascal Eenkhoorn (NED)	Team Jumbo–Visma	+ 9"
5	Jack Bauer (NZL)	Mitchelton–Scott	+ 9"
6	Mauro Schmid (SUI)	Leopard Pro Cycling	+ 9"
7	Grega Bole (SLO)	Bahrain–McLaren	+ 9"
8	Sjoerd Bax (NED)	Metec–TKH	+ 9"
9	Petr Vakoč (CZE)	Alpecin–Fenix	+ 9"
10	Fabio Van den Bossche (BEL)	Sport Vlaanderen–Baloise	+ 9"

General classification after Stage 4
Rank	Rider	Team	Time
1	Damien Howson (AUS)	Mitchelton–Scott	14h 44' 35"
2	Jack Bauer (NZL)	Mitchelton–Scott	+ 19"
3	Markus Hoelgaard (NOR)	Uno-X Pro Cycling Team	+ 29"
4	Adam Ťoupalík (CZE)	Elkov–Kasper	+ 43"
5	Chad Haga (USA)	Team Sunweb	+ 44"
6	Jakub Otruba (CZE)	Elkov–Kasper	+ 47"
7	Koen Bouwman (NED)	Team Jumbo–Visma	+ 47"
8	Pascal Eenkhoorn (NED)	Team Jumbo–Visma	+ 48"
9	Petr Vakoč (CZE)	Alpecin–Fenix	+ 55"
10	Otto Vergaerde (BEL)	Alpecin–Fenix	+ 58"

== Classification leadership table ==
In the 2020 Czech Cycling Tour, four jerseys were awarded. The general classification was calculated by adding each cyclist's finishing times on each stage. The leader of the general classification received a yellow jersey, sponsored by the Olomouc Region and Moravian-Silesian Region, and the winner of this classification is considered the winner of the race.

Points for the points classification
Type	1	2	3	4	5	6	7	8	9	10	11	12	13	14	15
Stage finishes	25	20	16	14	12	10	9	8	7	6	5	4	3	2	1
Intermediate sprint	5	3	1	0											

The second classification was the points classification. Riders were awarded points for finishing in the top fifteen in a stage. Points were also on offer at intermediate sprints. The leader of the points classification wore a green jersey, sponsored by Satum.

There was also a mountains classification for which points were awarded for reaching the top of a climb before other riders. The climbs were categorized, in order of increasing difficulty, as third, second and first-category. The leader of the mountains classification wore a polkadot jersey, sponsored by Emco.

The fourth jersey was a classification for young riders classification, marked by a white jersey sponsored by the Best of British Cars (Jaguar, Land Rover). Only Hungarian riders were eligible and they were ranked according to their placement in the general classification of the race.

The final classification was the team classification, for which the times of the best three cyclists in each team on each stage was added together; the leading team at the end of the race was the team with the lowest cumulative time.

Classification leadership by stage
Stage	Winner	General classification	Points classification	Mountains classification	Young rider classification	Team classification
1	Mitchelton–Scott	Luke Durbridge	not awarded	not awarded	Kaden Groves	Mitchelton–Scott
2	Jordi Meeus	Luke Durbridge	Jordi Meeus	Koen Bouwman	Kaden Groves	Mitchelton–Scott
3	Jordi Meeus	Kaden Groves	Jordi Meeus	Koen Bouwman	Kaden Groves	Mitchelton–Scott
4	Damien Howson	Damien Howson	Jordi Meeus	Koen Bouwman	Jakub Otruba	Elkov–Kasper
Final		Damien Howson	Jordi Meeus	Koen Bouwman	Jakub Otruba	Elkov–Kasper

== Final classification standings ==
Legend
Yellow jersey	Denotes the winner of the general classification	Green jersey	Denotes the winner of the points classification
Polkadot jersey	Denotes the winner of the mountains classification	White jersey	Denotes the winner of the young rider classification

=== General classification ===
Final general classification (1–10)
Rank	Rider	Team	Time
1	Damien Howson (AUS)	Mitchelton–Scott	14h 44' 35"
2	Jack Bauer (NZL)	Mitchelton–Scott	+ 19"
3	Markus Hoelgaard (NOR)	Uno-X Pro Cycling Team	+ 29"
4	Adam Ťoupalík (CZE)	Elkov–Kasper	+ 43"
5	Chad Haga (USA)	Team Sunweb	+ 44"
6	Jakub Otruba (CZE)	Elkov–Kasper	+ 47"
7	Koen Bouwman (NED)	Team Jumbo–Visma	+ 47"
8	Pascal Eenkhoorn (NED)	Team Jumbo–Visma	+ 48"
9	Petr Vakoč (CZE)	Alpecin–Fenix	+ 55"
10	Otto Vergaerde (BEL)	Alpecin–Fenix	+ 58"

=== Points classification ===
Final points classification (1–10)
Rank	Rider	Team	Points
1	Jordi Meeus (BEL)	SEG Racing Academy	51
2	Max Kanter (GER)	Team Sunweb	36
3	Pascal Eenkhoorn (NED)	Team Jumbo–Visma	32
4	Markus Hoelgaard (NOR)	Uno-X Pro Cycling Team	28
5	Damien Howson (AUS)	Mitchelton–Scott	25
6	Amaury Capiot (BEL)	Sport Vlaanderen–Baloise	21
7	Kenneth Van Rooy (BEL)	Sport Vlaanderen–Baloise	19
8	Adam Ťoupalík (CZE)	Elkov–Kasper	17
9	Petr Vakoč (CZE)	Alpecin–Fenix	12
10	Jack Bauer (NZL)	Mitchelton–Scott	12

=== Mountains classification ===
Final mountains classification (1–10)
Rank	Rider	Team	Points
1	Koen Bouwman (NED)	Team Jumbo–Visma	41
2	Thimo Willems (BEL)	Sport Vlaanderen–Baloise	19
3	Chad Haga (USA)	Team Sunweb	18
4	Jimmy Janssens (BEL)	Alpecin–Fenix	17
5	Felix Gall (AUT)	Team Sunweb	17
6	Riccardo Zoidl (AUT)	Team Felbermayr–Simplon Wels	16
7	Damien Howson (AUS)	Mitchelton–Scott	16
8	Jack Bauer (NZL)	Mitchelton–Scott	16
9	Yannik Achterberg (GER)	Maloja Pushbikers	9
10	Pascal Eenkhoorn (NED)	Team Jumbo–Visma	7

=== Young rider classification ===
Final young rider classification (1–10)
Rank	Rider	Team	Time
1	Jakub Otruba (CZE)	Elkov–Kasper	14h 45' 22"
2	Marco Frigo (ITA)	SEG Racing Academy	+ 17"
3	Ide Schelling (NED)	Bora–Hansgrohe	+ 25"
4	Fabio Van den Bossche (BEL)	Sport Vlaanderen–Baloise	+ 31"
5	Mauro Schmid (SUI)	Leopard Pro Cycling	+ 38"
6	Marijn van den Berg (NED)	Metec–TKH	+ 2' 24"
7	Stan van Tricht (BEL)	SEG Racing Academy	+ 3' 19"
8	Daan Hoole (NED)	SEG Racing Academy	+ 3' 21"
9	Petr Kelemen (CZE)	Czech Republic	+ 3' 40"
10	Mattias Skjelmose Jensen (DEN)	Leopard Pro Cycling	+ 3' 44"

=== Teams classification ===
Final teams classification (1–10)
Rank	Team	Time
1	Elkov–Kasper	43h 35' 49"
2	Alpecin–Fenix	+ 0"
3	Sport Vlaanderen–Baloise	+ 31"
4	Bahrain–McLaren	+ 40"
5	Mitchelton–Scott	+ 49"
6	Team Jumbo–Visma	+ 3' 13"
7	Uno-X Pro Cycling Team	+ 3' 22"
8	Metec–TKH	+ 3' 48"
9	Leopard Pro Cycling	+ 4' 46"
10	SEG Racing Academy	+ 6' 06"

== See also ==
- 2020 in men's road cycling
- 2020 in sports
