= Jack Bauer (cyclist) =

New Zealand racing cyclist

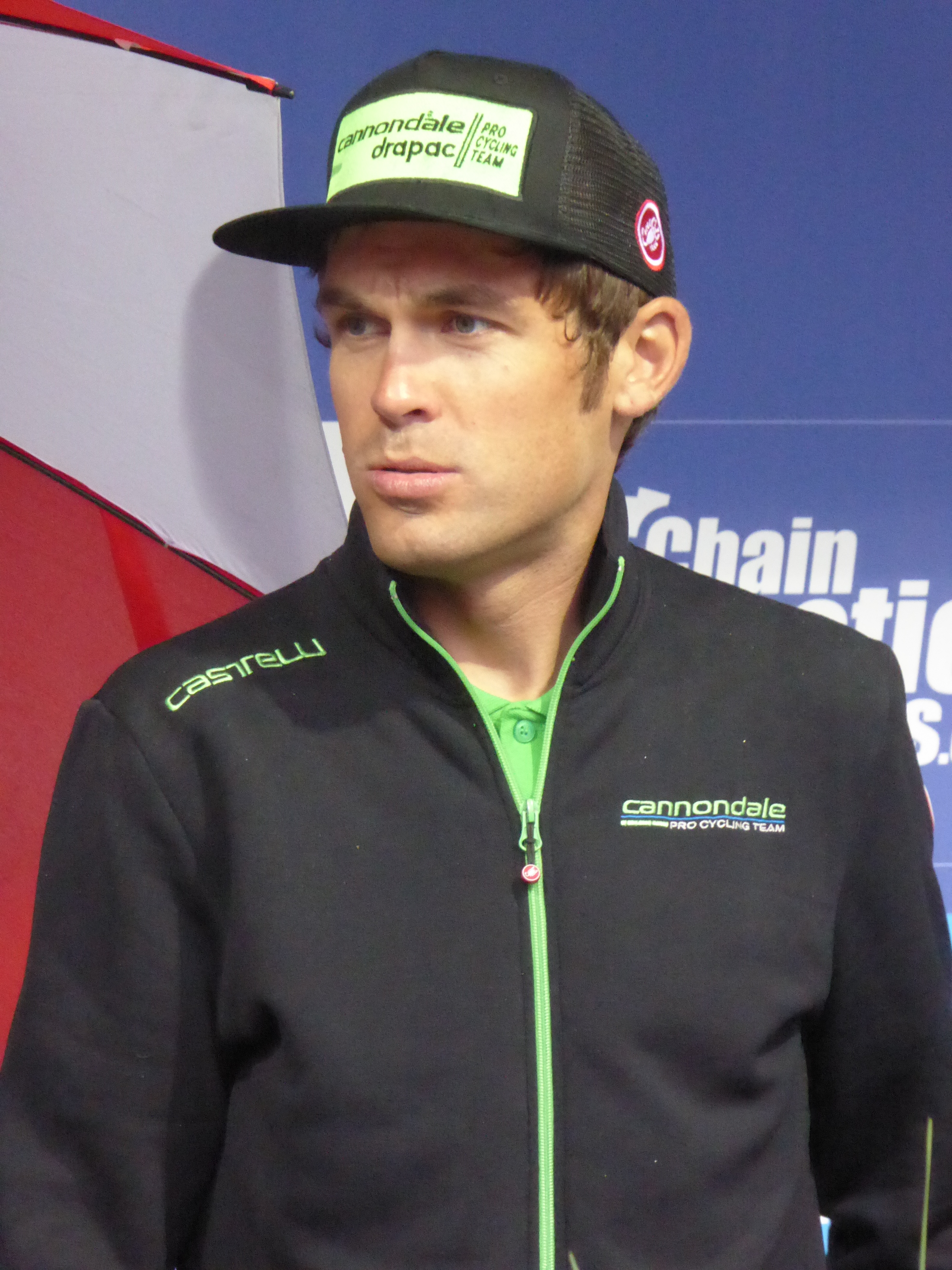
- Bauer at the 2016 Tour of Britain

Personal information
- Full name: Hans Jacob Bauer
- Nickname: Jack
- Born: 7 April 1985 (age 41) Tākaka, New Zealand
- Height: 1.91 m (6 ft 3 in)
- Weight: 74 kg (163 lb; 11 st 9 lb)

Cycling career
- Sport: Cycling
- Current team: Retired
- Discipline: Road
- Role: Rider
- Rider type: Rouleur

Amateur team
- 2009: Kingsnorth International Wheelers

Professional teams
- 2010–2011: Endura Racing
- 2012–2016: Garmin–Barracuda
- 2017: Quick-Step Floors
- 2018–2022: Mitchelton–Scott
- 2023: Q36.5 Pro Cycling Team

Major wins
- Grand Tours Giro d'Italia 1 TTT stage (2012) One-day races and Classics National Road Race Championships (2010) National Time Trial Championships (2017) Japan Cup (2013)
Medal record
Men's road bicycle racing
Representing New Zealand
Commonwealth Games
Silver medal – second place	Glasgow 2014	Road race

Hans Jacob Bauer (born 7 April 1985) is a New Zealand former professional road racing cyclist, who competed as a professional from 2010 to 2023.

== Early life ==
Bauer was raised in a remote area of New Zealand called Parapara near the township of Tākaka in Golden Bay. In 2003, Bauer began his tertiary studies at the University of Otago in Dunedin, New Zealand, whilst residing at Aquinas College in his first year. He was a nationally ranked mountain biker at the time. Whilst there, he was also often seen around the Dunedin Music scene playing his bass guitar in a band called Dream Farm. In 2006, Bauer earned his bachelor's degree in Physical Education from Otago University in Dunedin, Otago, New Zealand.

Bauer then worked as a cycle courier in Wellington for a year.

== Career ==
Bauer moved to Ghent in 2009. He raced in amateur races and as a result obtained a contract with Endura Racing.

While riding for Endura Racing, Bauer won the 2010 New Zealand National Road Race Championships. In a sprint finish on the 186 km Christchurch course, he finished ahead of Hayden Roulston and Julian Dean. Bauer said of the victory "I didn't really think I had the legs to last out there today but I managed to go with Roulston and Dean when they attacked on the hill and when we got down to a bunch of four on the last leg I hung in. It was a quality field so I'm stoked."

Bauer came tenth in the Olympic road race at the 2012 London Olympics. He said of the race "I was really struggling with 20km to go. I just started cramping up really badly and the weather was a bit warmer than I expected. Hydration is always hard and I started cramping pretty bad. I'm happy."

In November 2011, Bauer signed with the renamed Garmin–Barracuda squad, for the 2012 season. He remained with Garmin–Sharp for the 2013, 2014, and 2015 seasons.

Jack Bauer won the 2013 Japan Cup. After initially coming in second place, he was upgrade to first place after Michael Rogers was disqualified for failing a drug test for clenbuterol.

In the 2014 Jayco Herald Sun Tour, Bauer won the Prologue from Tom Scully. He said of the win "It's a bit of a pity to knock a fellow Kiwi [Tom Scully] off the top perch, but it might as well be another Kiwi doing it,"

On the fifteenth stage of the 2014 Tour de France, Bauer broke away with Martin Elmiger for 222 km, only to be caught by the charging peloton a few meters from the line. Bauer said of the effort "It's a childhood dream to win a stage at the Tour. And for a person like myself, I’m normally a domestique. It was my first chance to actually be up the road...I really gave it absolutely everything. As you could see from my meltdown at the finish line I was pretty disappointed to come away empty-handed." Charly Wegelius said of Bauer being caught on the line: "It's terrible. Heart breaking. I don’t know. Yeah. I don’t know. They could have just put the finish line 20 meters earlier and it would have been fine." Cycling Weekly described the finish as "one of the most exciting sprint finishes in living memory".

In the 2014 Commonwealth Games in Glasgow, Jack Bauer won the silver medal in the road race behind Geraint Thomas in very wet conditions. Bauer said "When I attacked, of course gold was always the goal...But when I was joined by Thomas – he's one of the classiest riders in the world, he's really versatile, he's good in all weather, and he's just come off the Tour was well. So I knew that he would be a hard man to beat and that silver was probably going to be as good as I could get".

Jack Bauer broke his femur in stage five of the 2015 Tour de France. After "a tiny little crash" he rode 90 km to the finish using his other leg before abandoning. Bauer said of it "It's actually the first bone I've broken to date, both on my bike in my career and in my life, so I thought I'd start at the top and break all the big ones,"

In stage five of the 2016 Tour of Britain, Jack Bauer escaped in a five-man breakaway, and survived until the end, winning the stage. He said of it "if you have an opportunity to win, you lay it all on the line, [so] I didn’t think about what the bunch was doing...If they catch you, they catch you. I’d have regretted more being beaten by one of the other guys in the break."

In 2017, Bauer won the New Zealand time trial championships. He said of the 40 km race in Napier, New Zealand "I am so thrilled to win this national title and to be able to take the national jersey back to Europe for my new team. I had no expectations today as it was more of a 40km hit-out for my major goal of the road championship on Sunday."

In the 2020 Czech Cycling Tour, Bauer, riding for Mitchelton–Scott came second in the general classification in the four stage race, 19 seconds behind teammate Damien Howson.

Bauer currently resides in Girona, Catalonia, Spain.

== Major results ==
2009
2nd Overall Tour of Southland

1st Stage 2

2010
1st Road race, National Road Championships
1st Stage 5 Tour of Wellington
2nd Overall Tour of Southland
Commonwealth Games

8th Time trial
10th Road race

2011
1st Stage 2 Tour of Utah
2nd Overall Olympia's Tour
9th Overall Tour de Normandie
2012
1st Stage 4 (TTT) Giro d'Italia
1st Stage 2 (TTT) Tour of Qatar
2nd Overall Tour de Vineyards

1st Stages 1 & 4

4th Overall Driedaagse van West-Vlaanderen
10th Road race, Olympic Games
2013
1st Japan Cup
5th Overall Tour of Britain
2014
1st Prologue Herald Sun Tour
2nd Road race, Commonwealth Games
2nd Road race, National Road Championships
7th Overall Tour de Vineyards

1st Stage 5

2015
7th Overall Bayern Rundfahrt
8th E3 Harelbeke
2016
1st Stage 5 Tour of Britain
1st Stage 1 (TTT) Czech Cycling Tour
2017
1st Time trial, National Road Championships
2020
2nd Overall Czech Cycling Tour

1st Stage 1 (TTT)

=== Grand Tour results timeline ===
Grand Tour	2012	2013	2014	2015	2016	2017	2018	2019	2020	2021	2022
Giro d'Italia	114	—	—	—	—	—	—	95	—	—	—
Tour de France	—	DNF	137	DNF	—	105	121	—	83	—	121
Vuelta a España	Has not contested during his career										
