= Metlika Castle =

15th-century castle at Metlika, Slovenia

Coordinates: 45°39′5.57″N 15°19′3.75″E

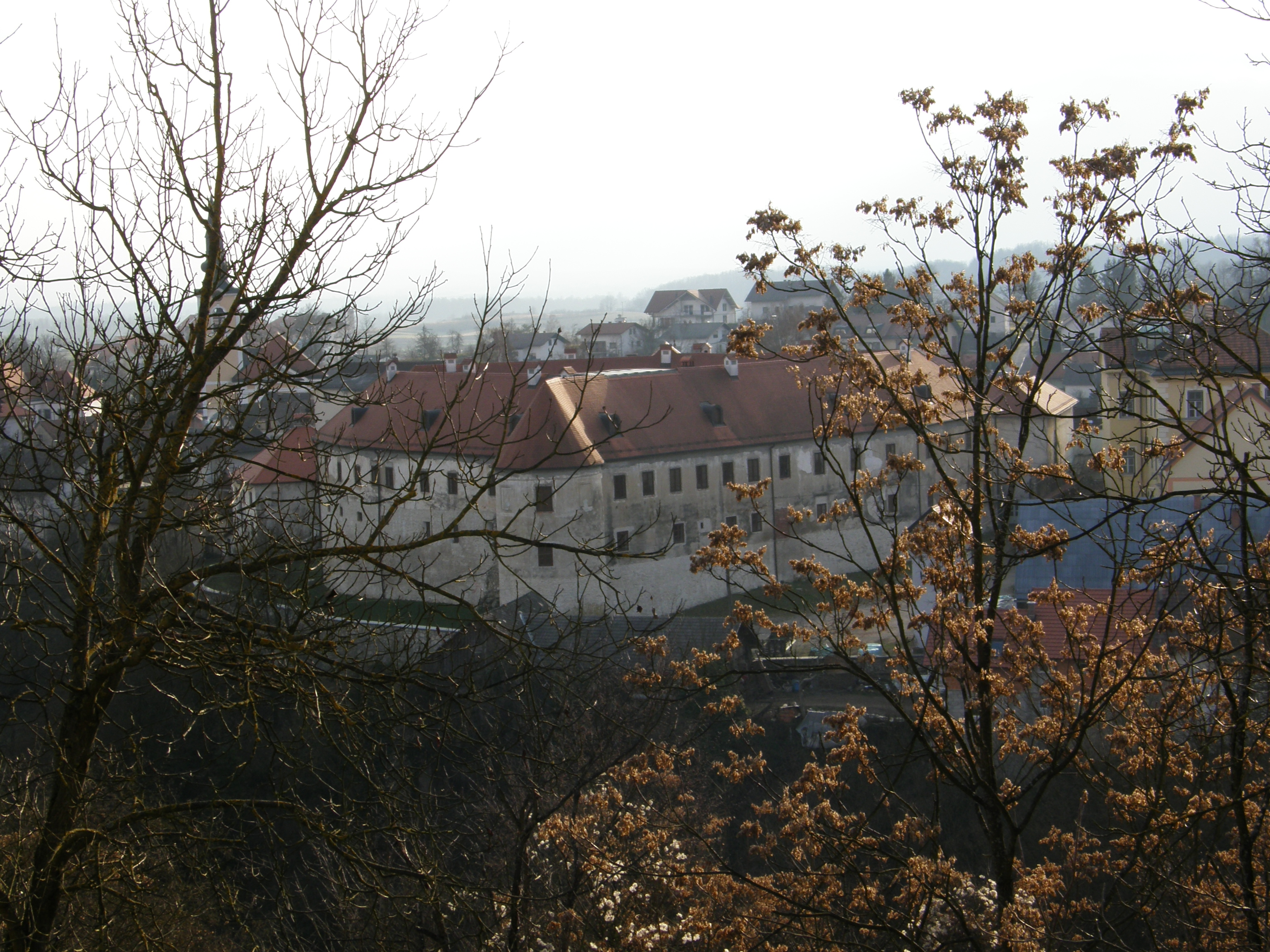
Metlika Castle, seen from Veselica Hill

Metlika Castle (pronounced [mɛˈtliːka]; Slovene: Grad Metlika or Metliški Grad) is a 15th-century castle located above the old part of the town of Metlika in southeastern Slovenia, very near the Croatian border.

== History ==
The castle was first mentioned in written sources in 1456. During the Ottoman incursions in the 15th and 16th century, it was owned by the Counts of Alap, and it played a key role in defense against the Turks. Later, the castle was owned by the house of Frankopan, and later yet by the chapterhouse of the bishopric of Zagreb.

During the 18th century, the castle was damaged by fire twice (in 1705 and 1790); after repairs it was bought by Jožef Savinšek in 1792. It survived World War II intact and was afterward nationalized without compensation and converted into the headquarters of the Museum of White Carniola (Slovene: Belokranjski muzej), established in 1951, and became home to some of its permanent collections. Exhibits include a cultural history of White Carniola, collections of Roman and medieval stone markers and memorials, and an ethnological collection on the historical way of life in White Carniola. The former castle stables and other outbuildings house the Metlika Slovene Firefighting Museum. In addition, the second floor contains a wedding hall, and the basement a wine cellar. Metlika Castle also features the Gangl Gallery for temporary exhibitions, which is part of Museum of White Carniola.

== Architecture ==
The three-story building encloses a central courtyard, surrounded on two sides by an arcaded corridor. Entrance to the courtyard is via a gate in a three-story tower. The castle has a pentagonal layout, punctuated with two defensive towers, and is built atop a rocky promontory above Obrh Creek.
