= Lorenzo Di Silvestro =

Personal information
- Born: 16 January 1970 (age 56) Como, Italy

Cycling career
- Sport: Cycling
- Current team: Retired
- Discipline: Road
- Role: Rider

Professional teams
- 1994: Brescialat–Ceramiche Refin
- 1996–1997: Cantina Tollo–Co.Bo.
- 1998: Ros Mary–Amica Chips
- 1999–2000: Besson Chaussures
- 2001–2002: Tacconi Sport–Vini Caldirola
- 2003: MBK–Oktos–Saint-Quentin
- 2004–2005: Team Nippo
- 2006: Acqua & Sapone
- 2007: OTC Doors–Lauretana

Lorenzo Di Silvestro (born 16 January 1970) is an Italian former road cyclist, who rode professionally from 1994 to 2007. He most notably won the 1996 Tour of Slovenia.

== Major results ==
1995
3rd Piccolo Giro di Lombardia
1996
1st Overall Tour of Slovenia

1st Stage 6

1st Stage 1 Settimana Ciclistica Lombarda
1999
4th Overall Tour de l'Ain
2000
9th Tour du Doubs
2002
9th Luk-Cup Bühl

=== Grand Tour general classification results timeline ===
| Grand Tour | 1996 | 1997 |
|---|---|---|
| Giro d'Italia | — | DNF |
| Tour de France | — | — |
| Vuelta a España | 105 | — |
