= Chad Haga =

American cyclist

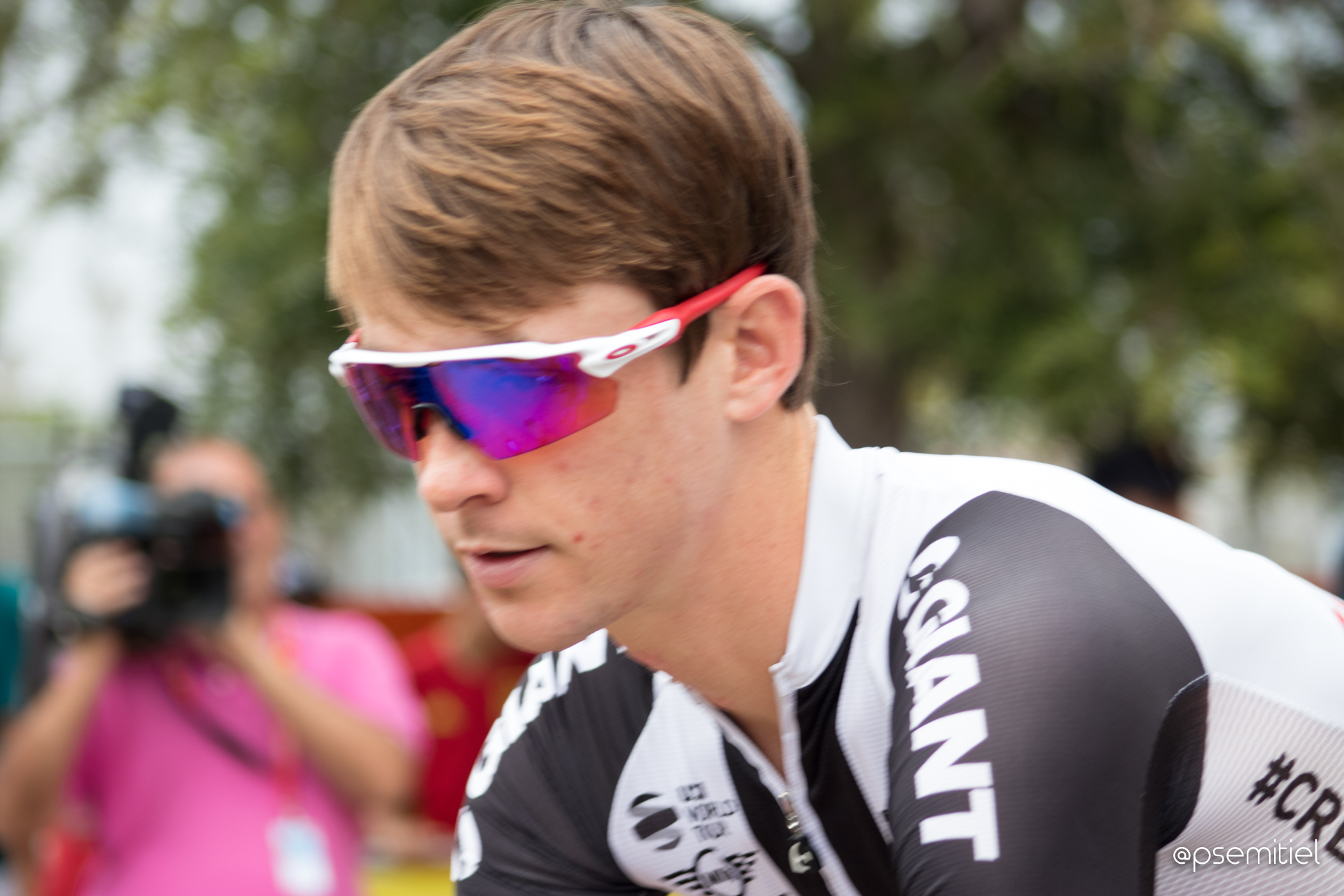
- Haga at the 2017 Vuelta a España

Personal information
- Full name: Chad Haga
- Nickname: Hagasaki
- Born: August 26, 1988 (age 38) McKinney, Texas
- Height: 1.91 m (6 ft 3 in)
- Weight: 71.5 kg (158 lb; 11 st 4 lb)

Cycling career
- Sport: Cycling
- Current team: Pas Racing Gravel Team
- Disciplines: Road; Gravel
- Role: Rider
- Rider type: Rouleur; Time trialist

Amateur teams
- 2006–2010: Texas A&M University Cycling Team
- 2009–2011: Team Brain and Spine Cycling
- 2010: Super Squadra
- 2011: Rio Grande Cycling
- 2024–: Pas Racing Gravel Team

Professional teams
- 2011–2013: Kelly Benefit Strategies–OptumHealth
- 2014–2021: Giant–Shimano
- 2022–2023: Human Powered Health

Major wins
- Grand Tours Giro d'Italia 1 individual stage (2019)
Medal record
Men's road cycling
Representing Team Sunweb
World Championships
Silver medal – second place	2018 Innsbruck	Team time trial

Chad Haga (/heɪɡə/; born August 26, 1988) is an American professional road and gravel racing cyclist.

== Career ==
He was born in McKinney, Texas and attended Texas A&M University where he earned his Bachelor of Science in Mechanical Engineering in 2010. While there he raced collegiately with the Texas A&M Cycling Team and as an amateur with Team Brain and Spine Cycling and Super Squadra. After Graduation he joined the Rio Grande Cycling squad. He began racing professionally in 2011 after joining Kelly Benefit Strategies–OptumHealth, before joining Giant–Shimano in 2014.

On January 23, 2016, while training in Caple, Spain, Haga was one of the six members of the Team Giant–Alpecin hit by a motorist who drove into on-coming traffic. All riders were in stable condition.

Haga started the 2018 season by racing the Tour Down Under. In July 2018, he was named in the start list for the Tour de France. He won the final individual time trial stage of the 2019 Giro d'Italia, his first victory in a Grand Tour.

After eight seasons with Team DSM and its precursors, Haga rejoined his first professional team, renamed as Human Powered Health, for the 2022 season.

== Major results ==
2011
1st Prologue Mount Hood Classic
3rd Overall Tour of Elk Grove
2012
1st Prologue Cascade Cycling Classic
4th Copperas Cove Classic
2013
1st Overall Joe Martin Stage Race
1st Prologue Tour of Elk Grove
2nd Overall Volta ao Alentejo
2nd Overall Redlands Bicycle Classic

1st Stage 1

3rd USA Cycling National Racing Calendar
3rd Overall McLane Pacific Classic
3rd Overall Cascade Cycling Classic
5th Time trial, National Road Championships
10th Overall Tour of California
2017
1st Mount Evans Hill Climb
2018
2nd Team time trial, UCI Road World Championships
2nd Time trial, National Road Championships
2019
1st Stage 21 (ITT) Giro d'Italia
2020
5th Overall Czech Cycling Tour
6th Overall Okolo Slovenska
2021
2nd Time trial, National Road Championships
2024
2nd Unbound Gravel 200
3rd The Traka 360

=== Grand Tour general classification results timeline ===
Grand Tour	2014	2015	2016	2017	2018	2019	2020	2021
Giro d'Italia	—	99	78	82	71	105	69	—
Tour de France	—	—	—	—	72	134	—	—
Vuelta a España	73	—	76	98	—	—	—	113

Legend
—	Did not compete
DNF	Did not finish
