= Stefano Giraldi =

Personal information
- Born: 1 May 1968 (age 58) Pistoia, Italy

Cycling career
- Sport: Cycling
- Current team: Retired
- Discipline: Road
- Role: Rider

Professional teams
- 1990–1994: Amore & Vita–Galatron
- 1995: Brescialat–Fago
- 1996: San Marco Group
- 1996–1997: Glacial–Selle Italia

Stefano Giraldi (born 1 May 1968) is an Italian former road cyclist, who rode professionally from 1990 to 1997. He notably finished second on the 8th stage of the 1997 Giro d'Italia, 23 seconds behind winner Mario Manzoni.

== Major results ==
1986
2nd Overall Giro della Lunigiana
1987
1st Coppa Lanciotto Ballerini
1988
1st GP Industria del Cuoio
1989
1st Stage 1 Giro delle Regioni
1990
3rd Giro della Romagna
1991
3rd Trofeo Matteotti
1992
8th Firenze–Pistoia
1993
6th Firenze–Pistoia
1994
5th Firenze–Pistoia
10th Giro del Piemonte
1995
3rd Firenze–Pistoia
6th Tour de Berne
9th Giro del Piemonte
1996
2nd Overall Tour of Slovenia

1st Stage 1

5th Milano–Vignola
7th Firenze–Pistoia
1997
10th Grand Prix de la Ville de Rennes

=== Grand Tour general classification results timeline ===
Grand Tour	1990	1991	1992	1993	1994	1995	1996	1997
Giro d'Italia	DNF	—	141	132	—	DNF	DNF	95
Tour de France	—	—	—	—	—	—	—	—
Vuelta a España	—	—	—	—	DNF	—	—	—
