= Tobias Steinhauser =

German cyclist

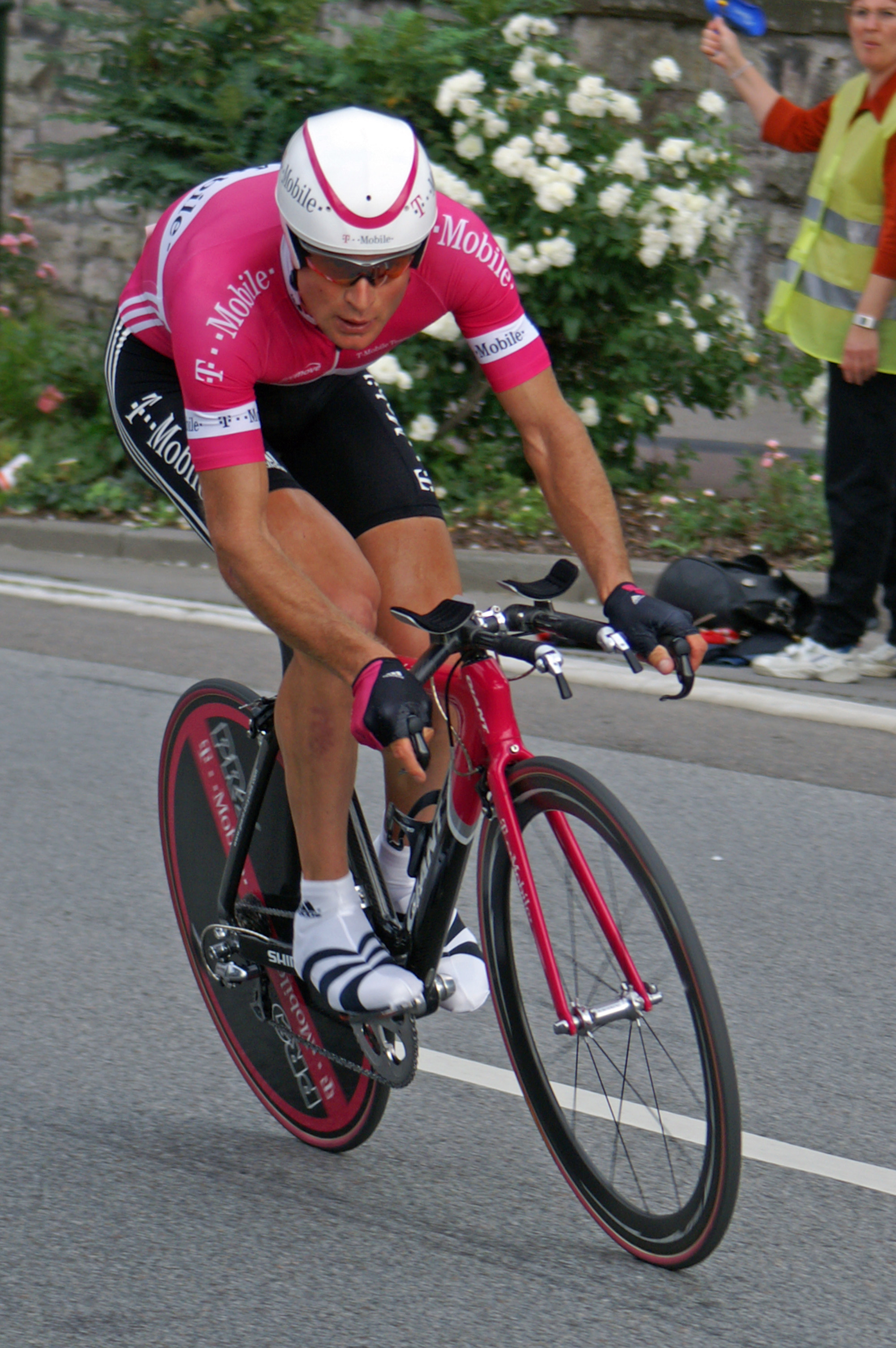
- Steinhauser at the 2005 Deutschland Tour

Personal information
- Born: 27 January 1972 (age 54) Lindenberg im Allgäu, Germany

Cycling career
- Sport: Cycling
- Current team: Retired
- Discipline: Road
- Role: Rider

Amateur teams
- 1987–1988: Rad Union Wangen
- 1989–1990: RSG Heilbronn
- 1991: Sportvereinigung Stuttgart-Feuerbach
- 1992–1995: RSV Öschelbronn

Professional teams
- 1996–1997: Refin–Mobilvetta
- 1998: Vitalicio Seguros
- 1999: Mapei–Quick-Step
- 2000–2002: Gerolsteiner
- 2003: Team Coast
- 2004–2005: T-Mobile Team

Tobias Steinhauser (born 27 January 1972) is a German former professional cyclist. He is the brother-in-law of Jan Ullrich.

Steinhauser lives together with his wife and three children in Scheidegg, Bavaria. After his professional career he became one of the co-developers of Jan Ullrich Bikes. His son Georg is also a successful professional cyclist.

== Major results ==
1994
1st Overall Tour de Slovénie
1995
1st Overall Giro delle Regioni

1st Stage 5

4th Overall Circuit Cycliste Sarthe
6th Overall Regio-Tour
1999
3rd Overall Tour de Luxembourg
6th Trofeo Pantalica
2000
1st Overall Hessen Rundfahrt
1st Giro del Lago Maggiore
1st Overall Rapport Toer

1st Stage 3 (ITT)

3rd Overall Bayern Rundfahrt
5th Road race, UCI Road World Championships
2001
9th Overall Paris–Nice
2002
1st Stage 9 Tour de Suisse
3rd Overall Deutschland Tour

=== Grand Tour general classification results timeline ===
Grand Tour	1996	1997	1998	1999	2000	2001	2002	2003	2004	2005
Giro d'Italia	—	DNF	—	—	—	—	—	—	—	—
Tour de France	113	—	—	—	—	—	—	DNF	—	81
Vuelta a España	—	—	—	—	—	—	—	—	—	—

Legend
—	Did not compete
DNF	Did not finish
