= Boris Premužič =

Slovenian cyclist

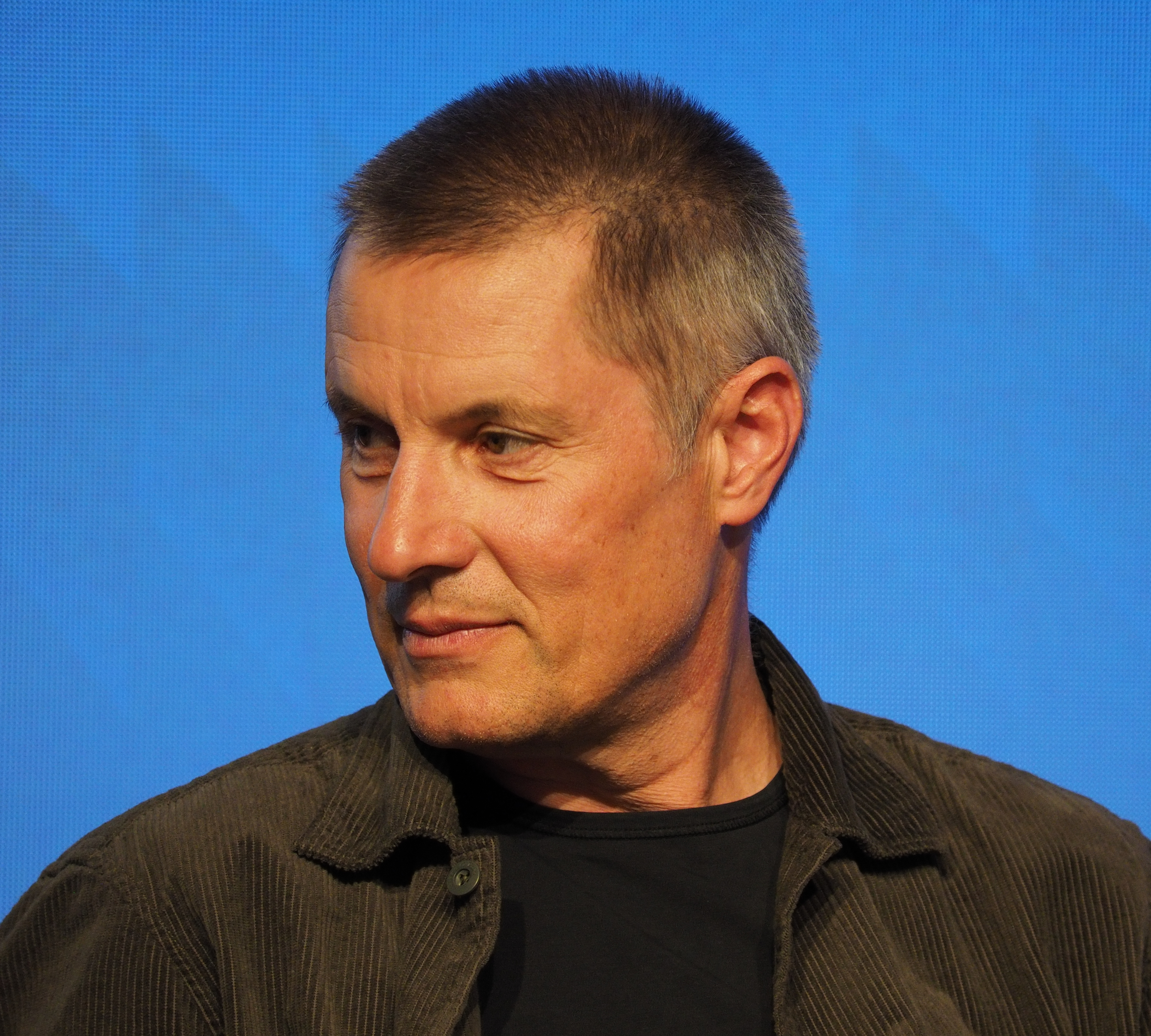

Personal information
- Born: 26 December 1968 (age 57) Ljubljana, Slovenia

Cycling career
- Sport: Cycling
- Current team: Retired
- Discipline: Road
- Role: Rider

Professional teams
- 2000–2002: KRKA–Telekom Slovenije
- 2004–2005: Sava Kranj

Boris Premužič (born 26 December 1968 in Ljubljana) is a Slovenian former cyclist, who competed as a professional from 2000 to 2005.

== Major results ==
1993
1st Overall Tour of Slovenia
1994
2nd Overall Tour of Slovenia
1995
2nd Overall Tour of Slovenia

1st Stage 4

1996
3rd Overall Okolo Slovenska
4th Overall Tour of Slovenia
1997
1st Stage 4 Okolo Slovenska
9th GP Kranj
1998
2nd Overall Tour of Yugoslavia
4th Raiffeisen Grand Prix
1999
5th Time trial, National Road Championships
10th GP Kranj
2000
3rd Overall Tour of Croatia

1st Stages 3 & 4

3rd Overall Tour of Slovenia
9th Overall UNIQA Classic
2001
3rd Time trial, National Road Championships
2002
1st Road race, National Road Championships
2003
10th GP Krka
2004
National Road Championships

2nd Road race
3rd Time trial

9th GP Krka
2005
9th GP Palma
