= Ralf Schmidt =

German footballer

Personal information
- Full name: Ralf Schmidt
- Date of birth: 9 October 1985 (age 41)
- Place of birth: Jena, East Germany
- Height: 1.81 m (5 ft 11 in)
- Position: Defender

Youth career
- 1991–2004: FC Carl Zeiss Jena

Senior career*
Years	Team	Apps	(Gls)
2004–2007	FC Carl Zeiss Jena	56	(1)
2007–2008	1. FC Nürnberg	7	(0)
2008–	FC Carl Zeiss Jena	116	(0)
Total		179	(1)
- * Club domestic league appearances and goals

Ralf Schmidt (born 9 October 1985 in Jena) is a German former footballer.

== Career ==
He played for 1. FC Nürnberg. He was an integral part of the team that won Jena's promotion to the second division in 2006. Playing in 32 games, he attracted the attention of the former Jena and now Nürnberg coach Hans Meyer who signed the 21-year-old on a three-year contract. To further his development, Schmidt was sent back to Jena on loan for one more year before joining the FCN squad in summer 2007. However, he was not able to play for the entire second half of the 2006–2007 season, being sidelined with a shoulder injury. Before his injury he played in 14 Second Division matches for Jena's first team.
