= Dimitri Sedun =

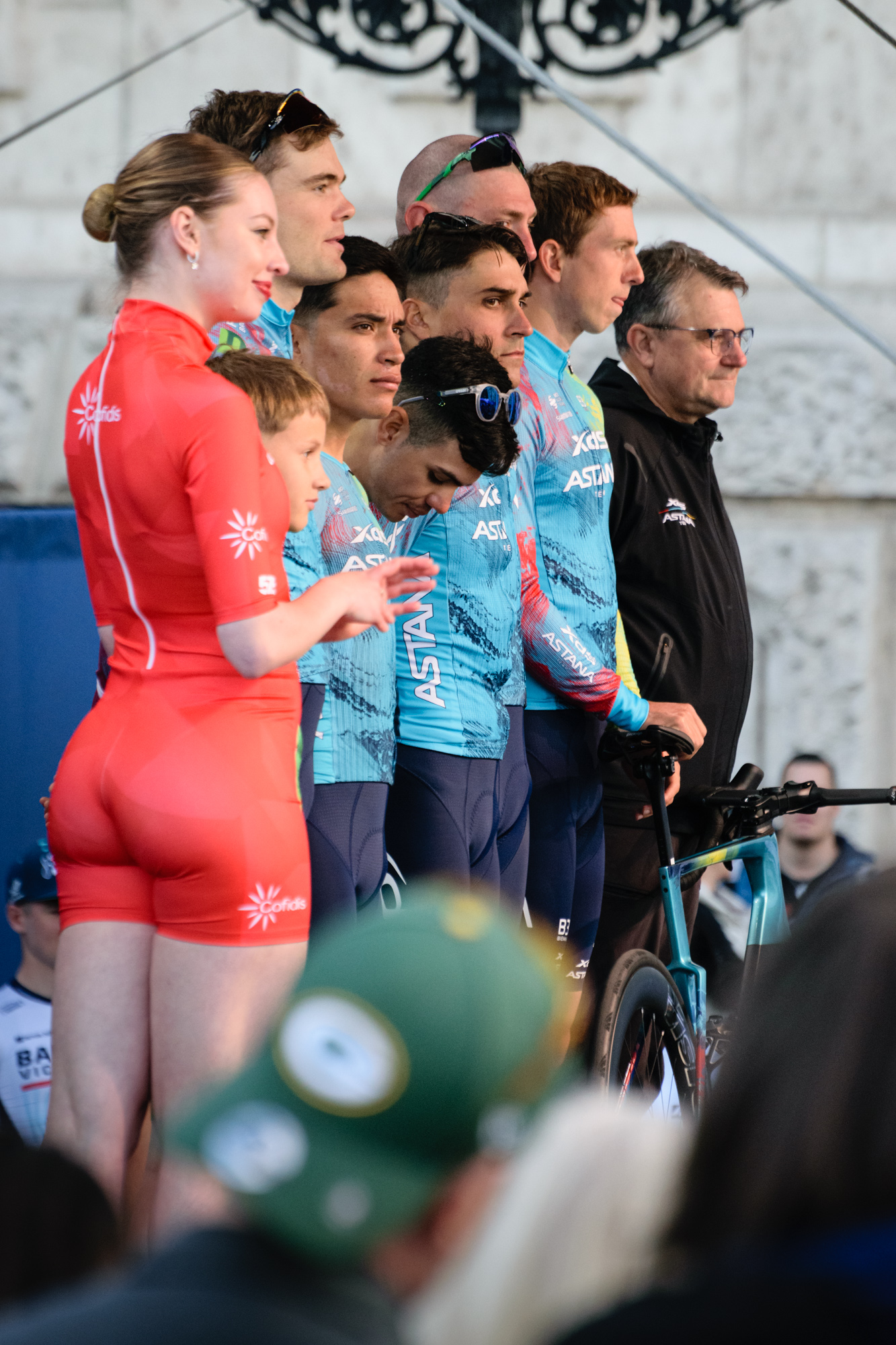
- Sedun (right) as directeur sportif for XDS Astana Team at the 2025 Tour de Hongrie

Personal information
- Born: 2 January 1971 (age 55) Merke, Soviet Union

Cycling career
- Sport: Cycling
- Current team: Retired
- Discipline: Road
- Role: Rider; Directeur sportif

Professional teams
- 1996–1997: Roslotto–ZG Mobili
- 1999: De Nardi–Pasta Montegrappa
- 2000: Mat–Ceresit–CCC
- 2001: De Nardi–Pasta Montegrappa

Managerial teams
- 2010–2020: Astana
- 2012–2014: Continental Team Astana

Dimitri Sedun (Дмитрий Седун; born 2 January 1971 in Merke) is a Russian former road cyclist. He worked as a Directeur sportif for Astana from 2010 to 2020. He is married to cyclist Nicole Brändli.

== Major results ==
1994
5th Overall Tour de Slovénie
1996
2nd Road race, National Road Championships
1999
2nd Memoriał Henryka Łasaka
3rd Road race, National Road Championships
4th Overall Tour de Serbie

1st Stage 4

6th Overall UNIQA Classic
2000
1st Stage 5 Course Cycliste de Solidarnosc et des Champions Olympiques
2001
8th Giro della Provincia di Siracusa
