= Marco Antonio Di Renzo =

Italian cyclist

Personal information
- Born: 1 August 1969 (age 57) Plochingen, Germany

Cycling career
- Sport: Cycling
- Current team: Retired
- Discipline: Road
- Role: Rider

Professional team
- 1996–2000: Cantina Tollo–Co.Bo.

Major wins
- Grand Tours Vuelta a España 1 individual stage (1996) Single-day races and Classics Tour de Vendée (1998)

Marco Antonio Di Renzo (born 1 August 1969 in Plochingen) is a former Italian cyclist.

== Major results ==
1995
2nd Gran Premio della Liberazione
3rd Gran Premio San Giuseppe
3rd Overall Tour de Slovenie
1996
1st Stage 3 Settimana Internazionale di Coppi e Bartali
1st Stage 11 Vuelta a España
3rd Overall Tour de Slovenie

1st Prologue & Stage 2

3rd Gran Premio della Costa Etruschi
1998
1st Tour de Vendée

=== Grand Tour general classification results timeline ===
Grand Tour	1996	1997	1998
Giro d'Italia	—	112	94
Tour de France	—	—	—
Vuelta a España	102	DNF	—

Legend
—	Did not compete
DNF	Did not finish
