= Čatež ob Savi =

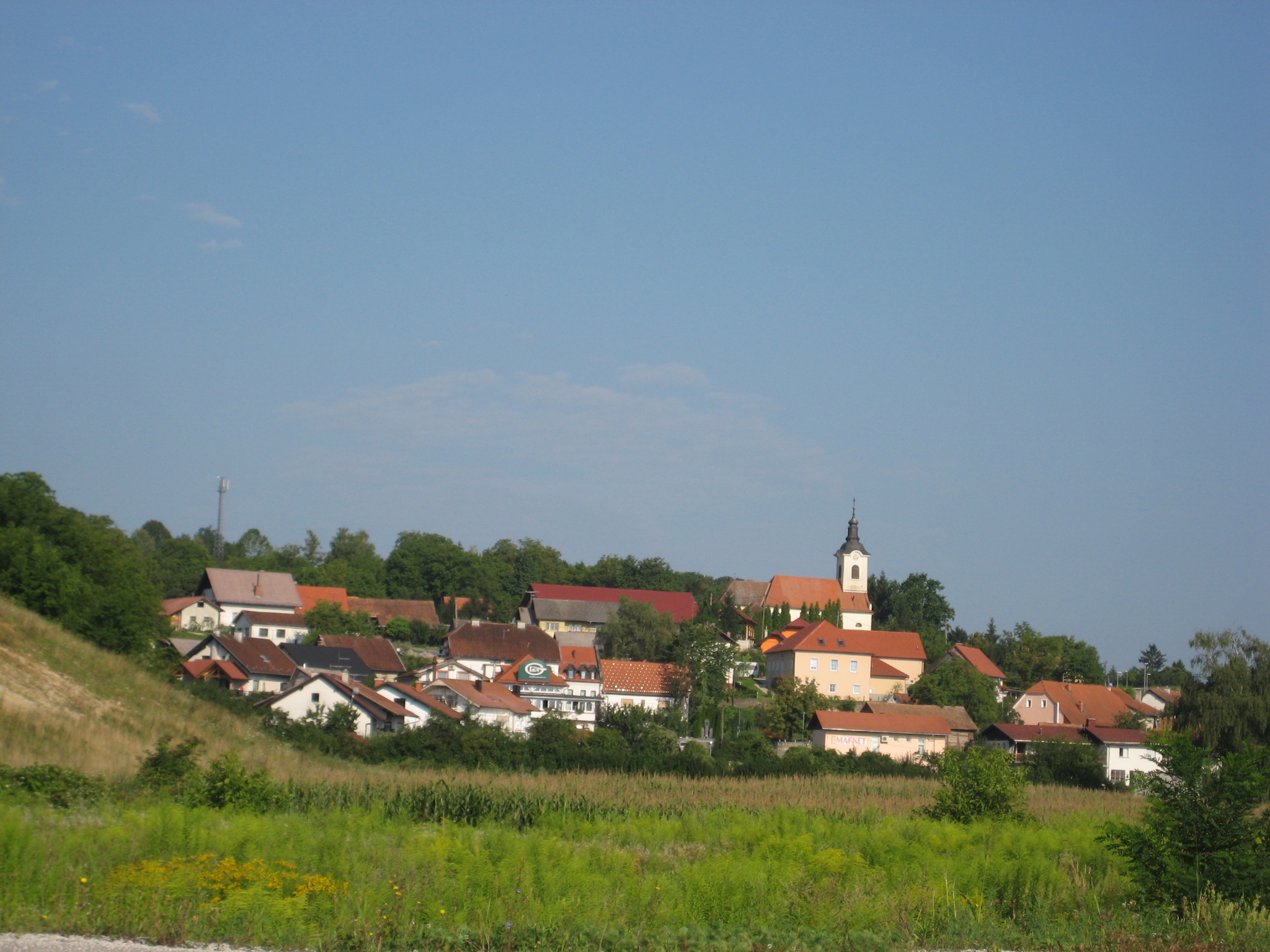

- Location in Slovenia
- Coordinates: 45°53′33.39″N 15°35′52.42″E
- Country: Slovenia
- Traditional region: Lower Carniola
- Statistical region: Lower Sava
- Municipality: Brežice

Area
  - Total: 5.44 km^{2} (2.10 sq mi)
- Elevation: 170.2 m (558 ft)

Population (2020)
  - Total: 342
  - Density: 62.9/km^{2} (163/sq mi)

Čatež ob Savi (pronounced [ˈtʃaːtɛʃ ɔp ˈsaːʋi]; German: Tschatesch) is a village on the right bank of the Sava River at its confluence with the Krka River in the Municipality of Brežice in eastern Slovenia. The area is part of the traditional region of Lower Carniola. It is now included with the rest of the municipality in the Lower Sava Statistical Region.

== Name ==
Čatež was attested in written sources in 1249 as Sates (and as Tzattesch in 1265 and Czates in 1392). The name is believed to be derived from the Slovene common noun *čretež 'cleared land'. A less likely theory derives the name from the Slovene common noun čret or čreta 'swamp'. Rejected derivations of the name include those from čata 'ambush' because of medieval attestations and linguistic geographical factors, and from Čatež (the name of a mythological dwarf). The name of the settlement was changed from Čatež to Čatež ob Savi in 1955. In the past the German name was Tschatesch.

== Churches ==
The parish church in the settlement is dedicated to Saint George (Slovene: sveti Jurij) and belongs to the Roman Catholic Diocese of Novo Mesto. It was first mentioned in written documents dating to 1323, but the current building was built in 1833. A second church belonging to the parish is built on a hill to the south of the main village. It is dedicated to Saint Vitus and was built in the second half of the 13th century. Its belfry was built in the early 19th century.

== Spa ==
A few kilometres to the east of the settlement is the large spa resort of Terme Čatež. In the 19th century the spa was known as Čatežke Toplice (German: Bad Tschatesch).

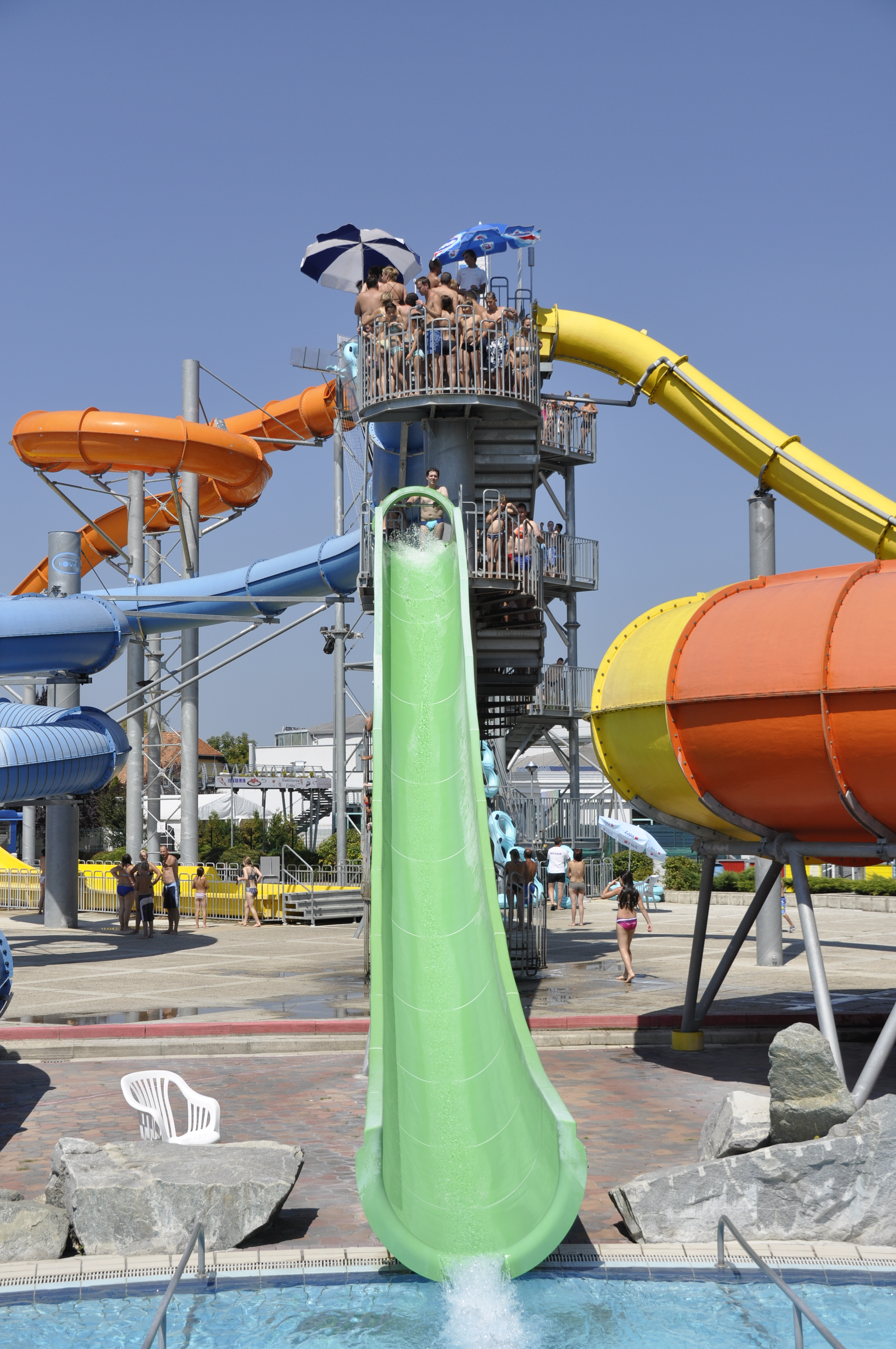
Slides of Terme Čatež
