= Metlika =

- Town
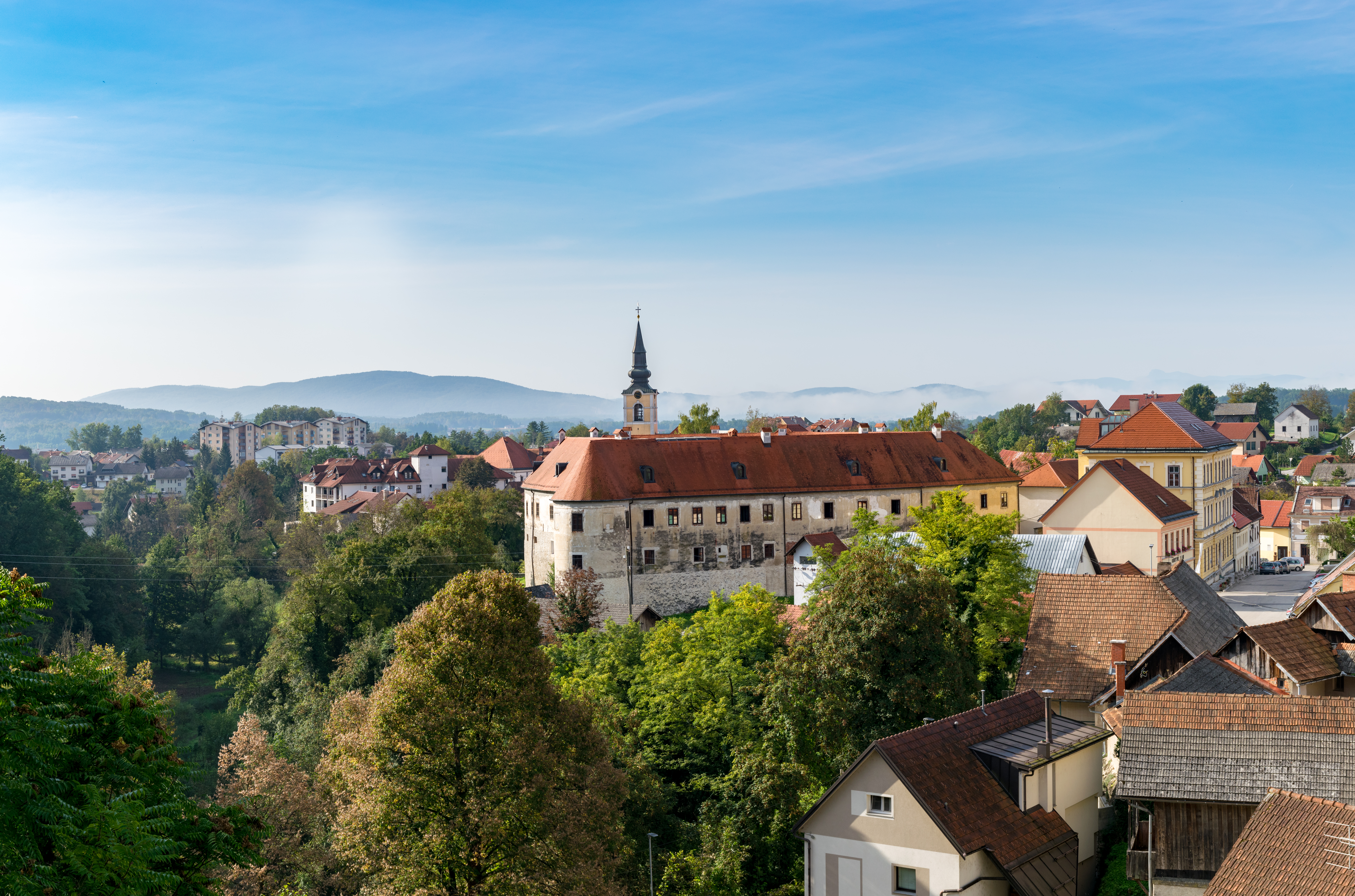
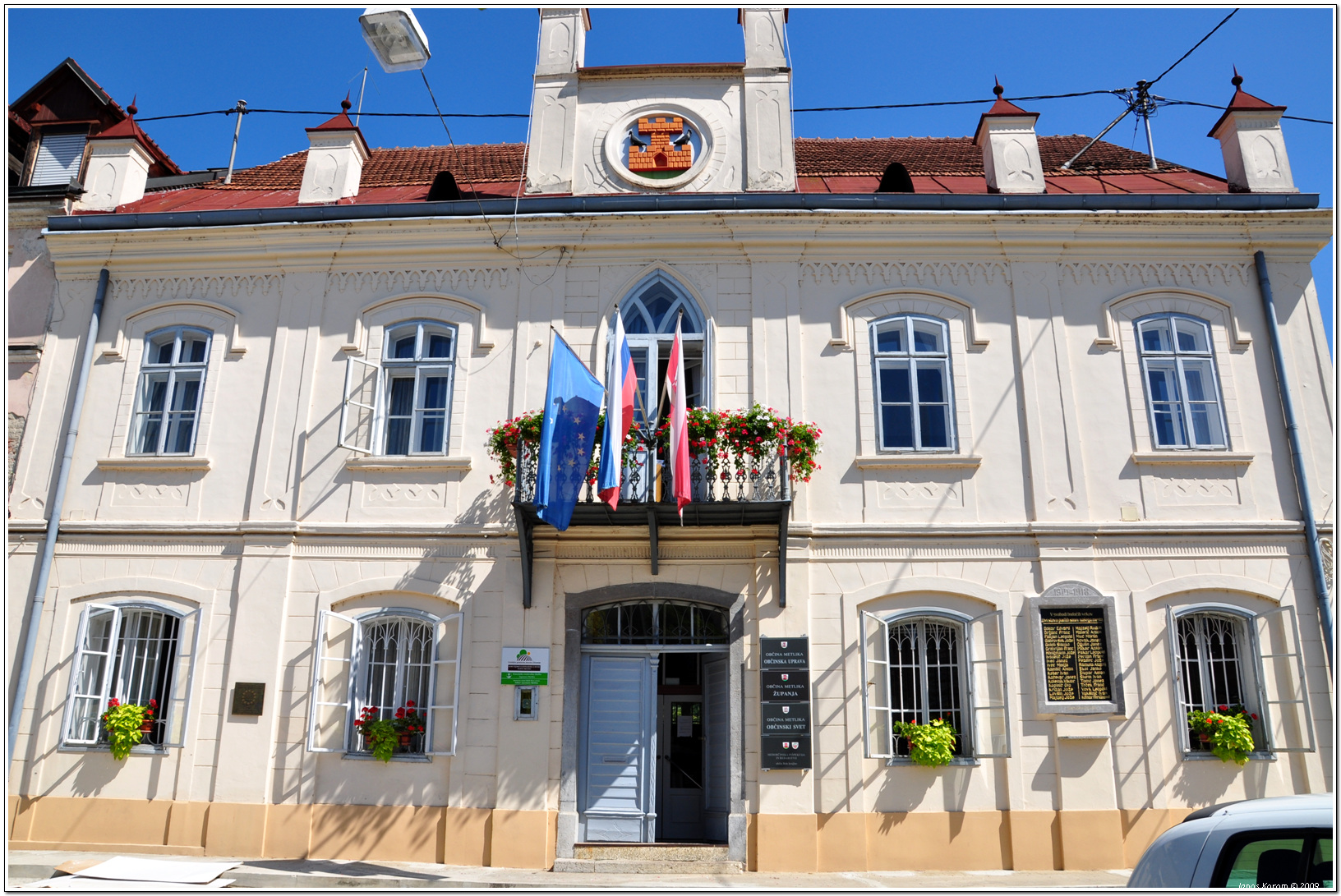
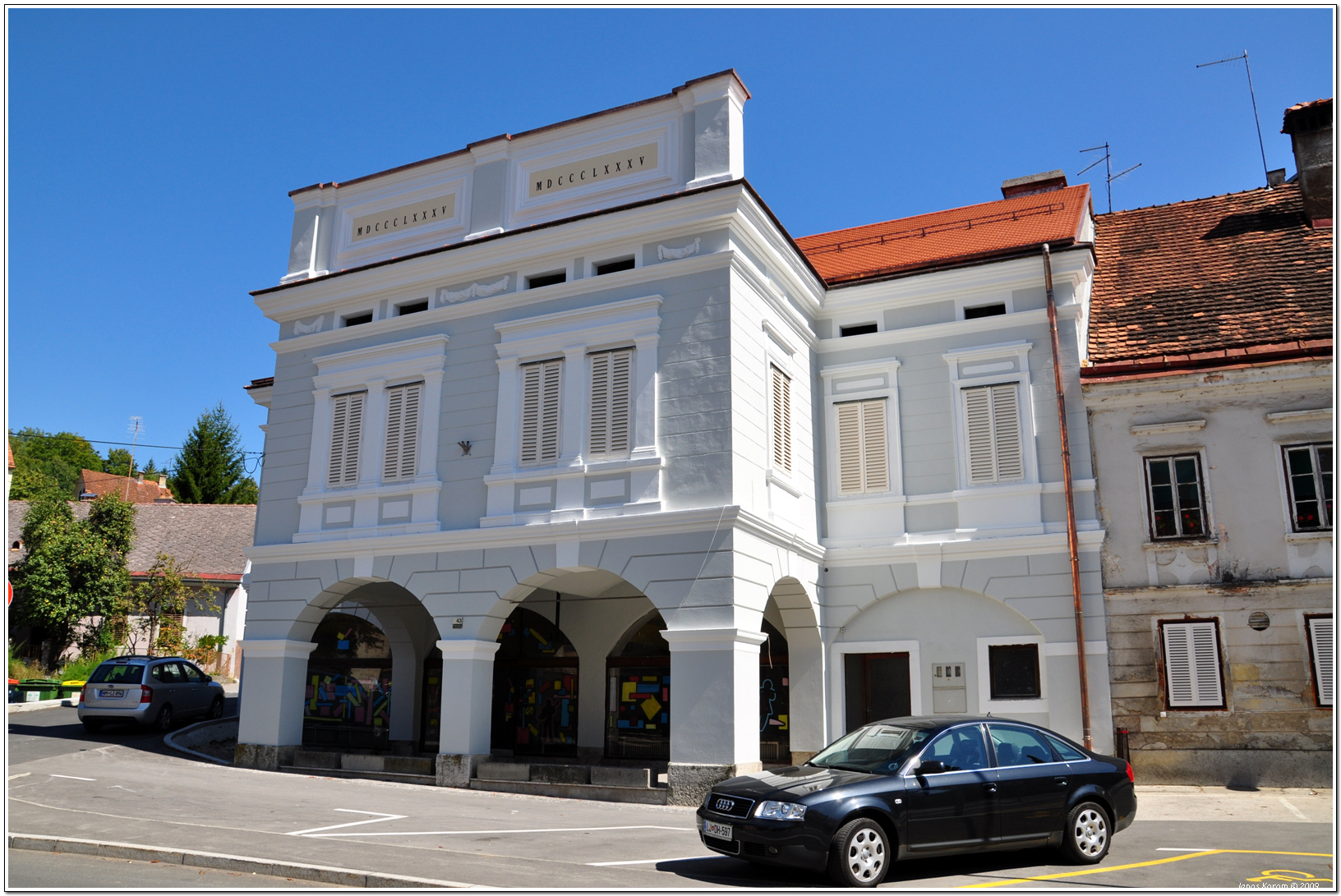
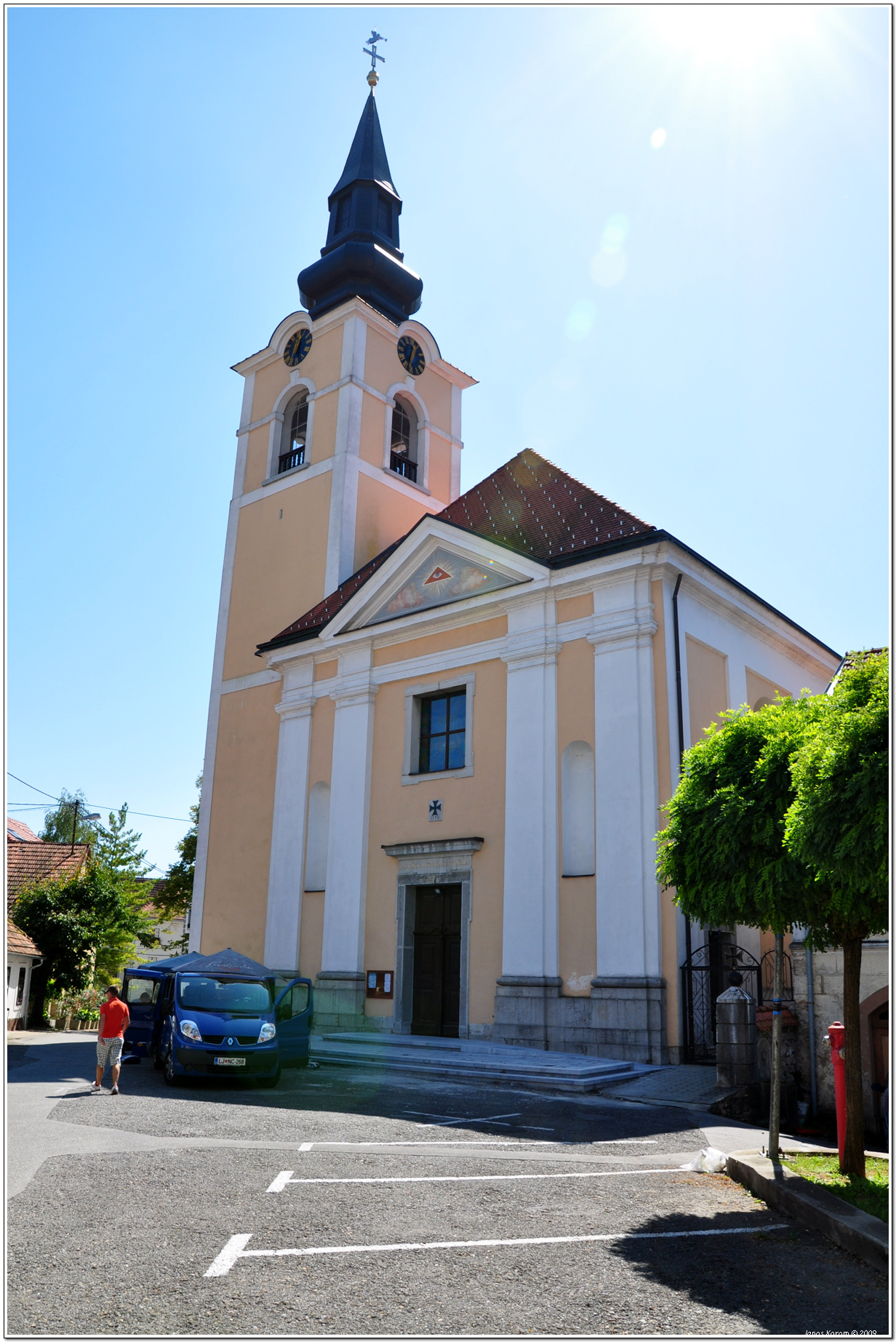
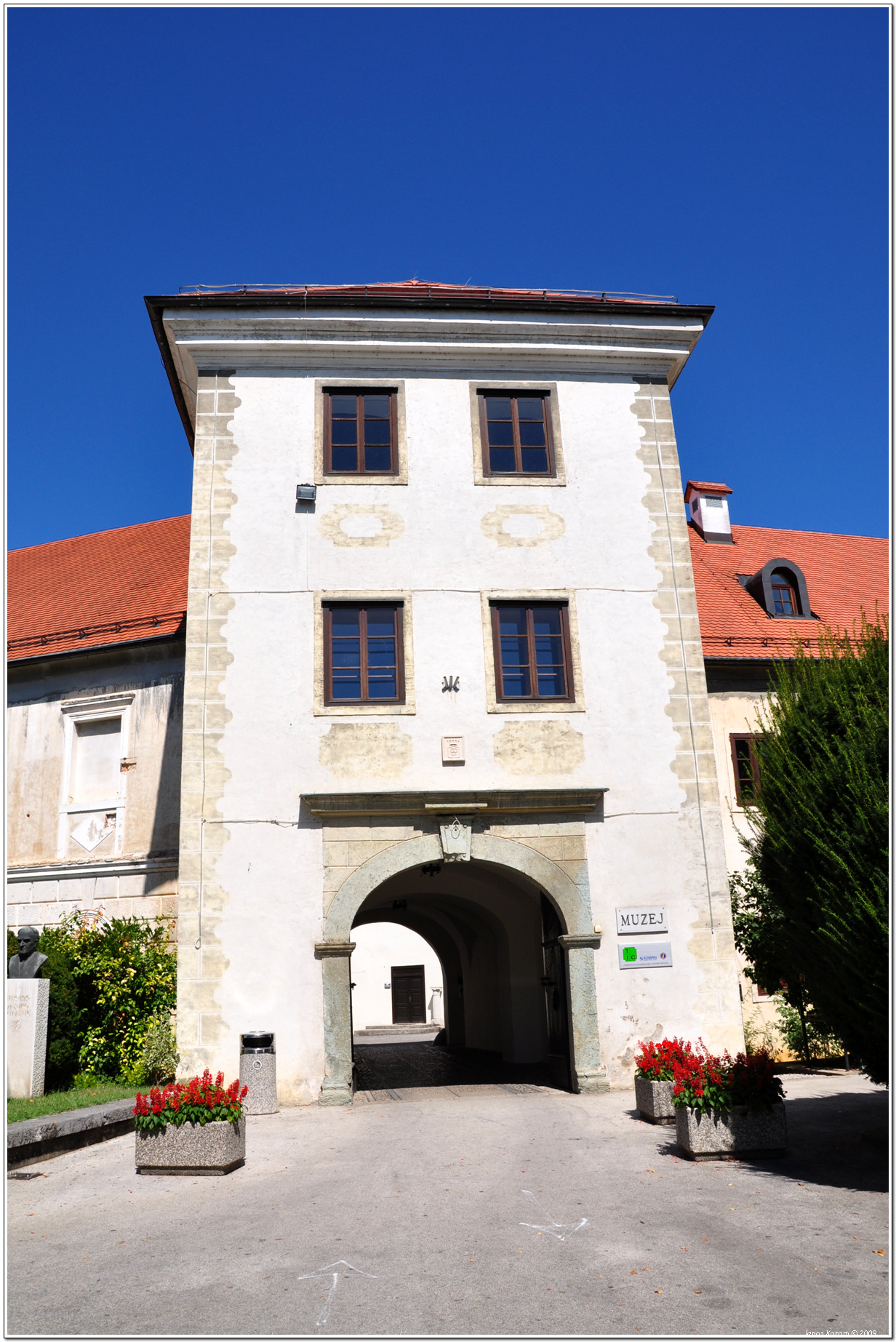
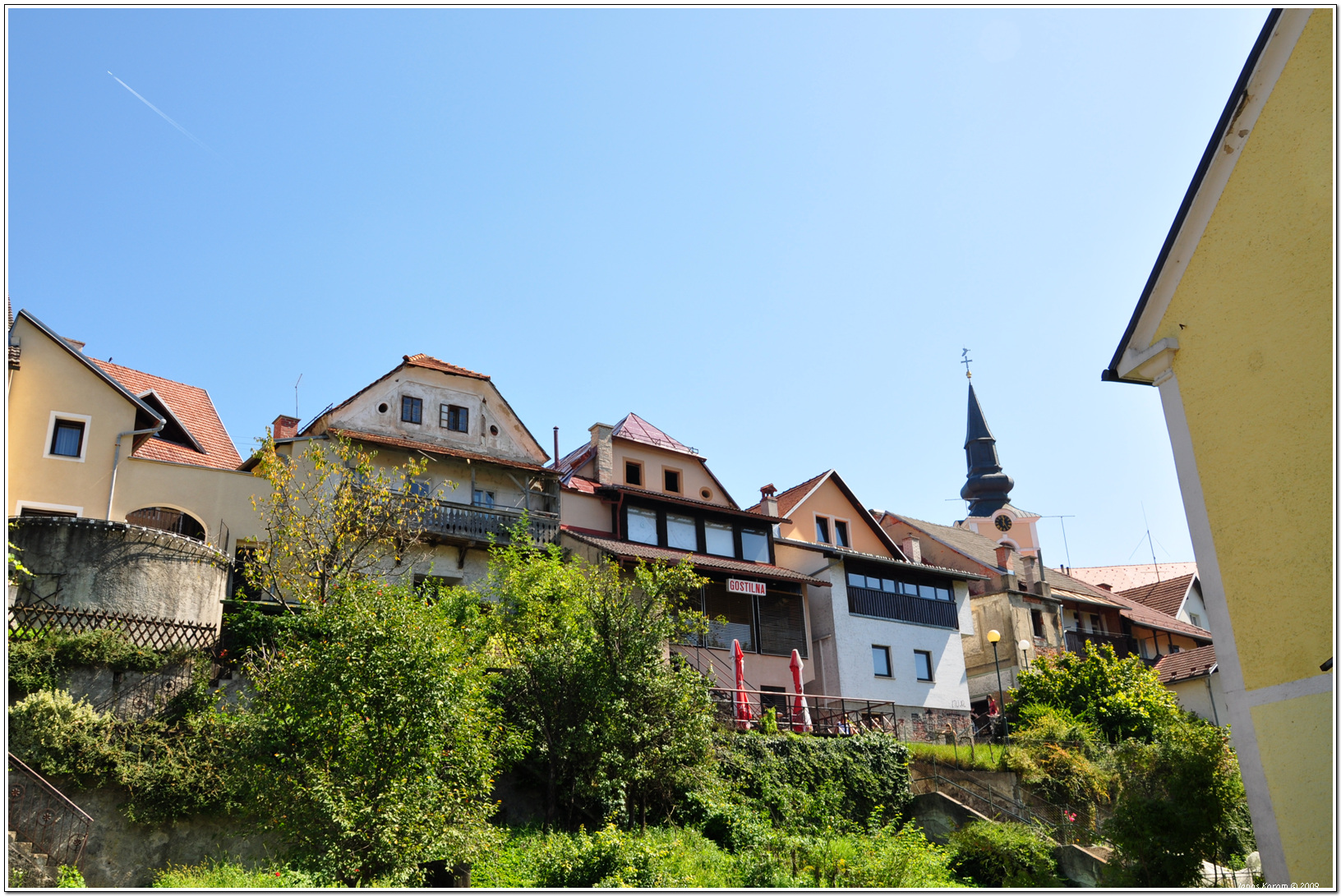
- From top, left to right: Overview of Metlika, Town Hall, Old palace, St. Nicholas' Church, Metlika Castle, Row of old houses

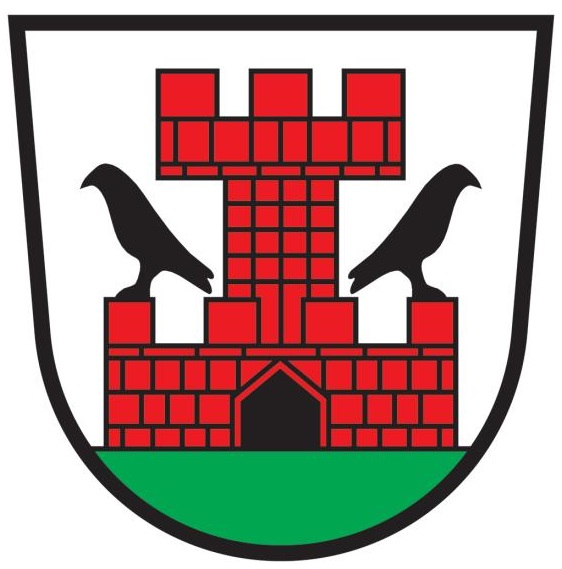
- Coat of arms

- Location in Slovenia
- Coordinates: 45°39′06″N 15°19′12″E
- Country: Slovenia
- Traditional region: White Carniola
- Statistical region: Southeast Slovenia
- Municipality: Metlika

Area
  - Total: 8.28 km^{2} (3.20 sq mi)
- Elevation: 175.5 m (576 ft)

Population (2019)
  - Total: 3,206
- Postal code: 8330
- Vehicle registration: NM

Metlika (pronounced [mɛˈtlìːka]; German: Möttling) is a town in southeastern Slovenia. It is the seat of the Municipality of Metlika. It lies on the left bank of the Kolpa River on the border with Croatia. It is in the heart of the area of White Carniola, the southeastern part of the traditional region of Lower Carniola. It is now included in the Southeast Slovenia Statistical Region.

== Name ==
Metlika was first mentioned in written sources in 1228 as Metlica (and as Methlica in 1268 and Metlika in 1337). The name is derived from the Slovene common noun metlika 'goosefoot', thus referring to the local flora. In the past the German name was Möttling.

== History ==
Archaeological evidence has shown that the area has been settled since prehistoric times. From about 1205 it was incorporated into the Imperial March of Carniola and was granted town privileges in 1335. It was frequently attacked during Ottoman raids in the 15th and 16th centuries. In the 17th century it was afflicted by an earthquake and in 1705 the entire town burned to the ground in a massive fire.

Metlika Castle is an originally 15th-century castle located above the old part of the town. It was rebuilt in the early 18th century after the town fire and again after it was damaged for a second time by fire in 1790. The castle was seized after the Second World War and converted into a local museum. The museum includes the Kambič Gallery, with paintings by Slovene artists.

The parish church in the town is dedicated to Saint Nicholas and belongs to the Roman Catholic Diocese of Novo Mesto. It was built on the site of a 14th-century building after the fire of 1705 in the Baroque style. Bishop Frederic Baraga worked here as a curate for several years before he left for the US and Canada.

Other churches in the town are dedicated to Saint Martin, also built in the 18th century, and Saint Roch, built in 1858. There is also a Greek Catholic church, one of only two churches of this rite in Slovenia. It was built in 1903 and is dedicated to Saints Cyril and Methodius.

Historical population
| Year | Pop. | ±% |
|---|---|---|
| 1948 | 1,373 | — |
| 1953 | 1,322 | −3.7% |
| 1961 | 1,516 | +14.7% |
| 1971 | 2,286 | +50.8% |
| 1981 | 3,112 | +36.1% |
| 1991 | 3,315 | +6.5% |
| 2002 | 3,225 | −2.7% |
| 2011 | 3,273 | +1.5% |
| 2021 | 3,226 | −1.4% |
Population size may be affected by changes in administrative divisions.
