= Branko Filip =

Slovenian cyclist and coach

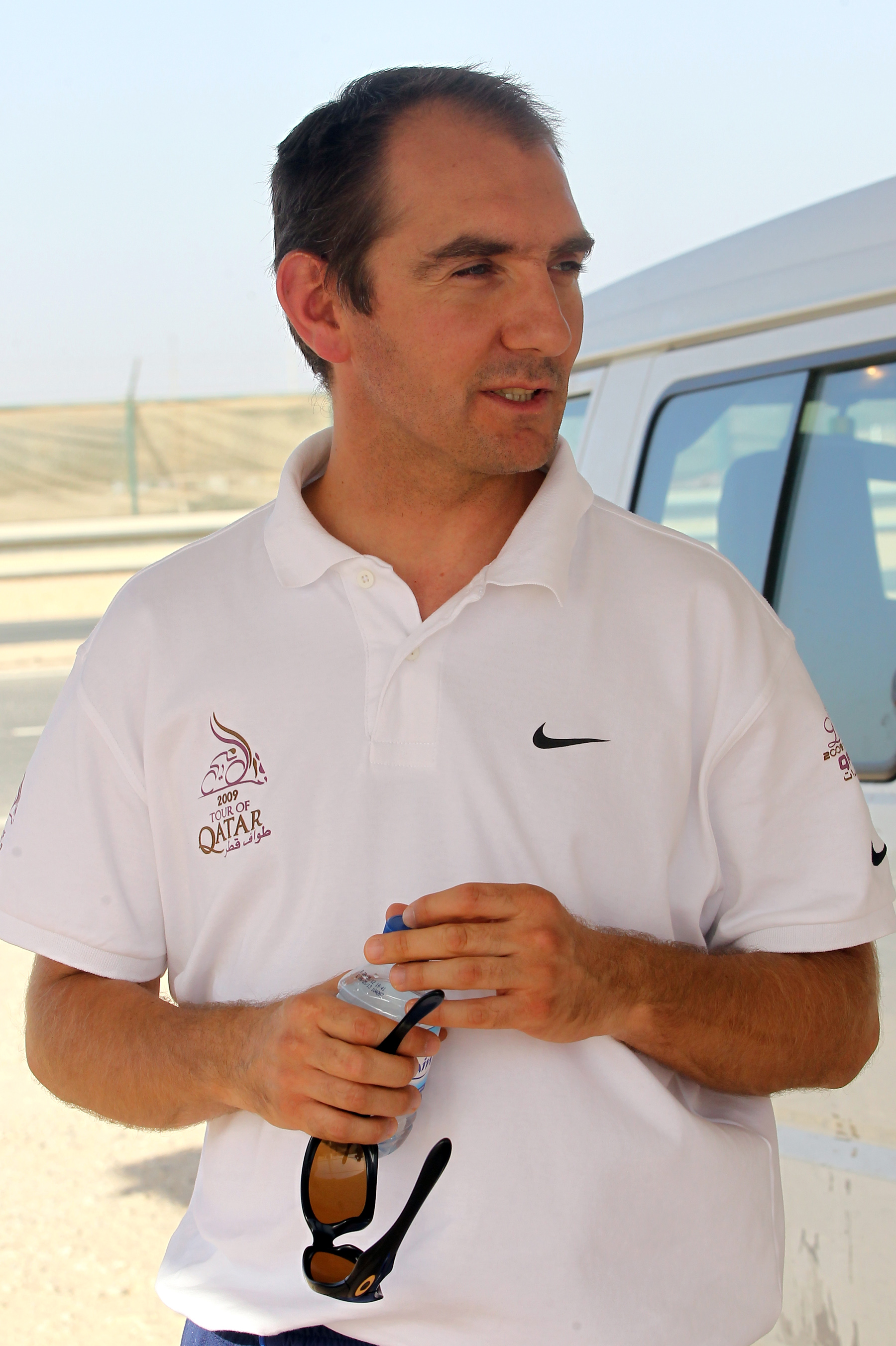
- Filip training the Qatari team in 2012

Personal information
- Born: 18 March 1975 (age 51) Novo Mesto, Slovenia

Cycling career
- Sport: Cycling
- Current team: Retired
- Discipline: Road
- Role: Rider
- Rider type: Time Trialist

Professional teams
- 1997–1998: KRKA-Telekom Slovenije
- 1999–2000: Gerolsteiner
- 2001–2004: KRKA-Telekom Slovenije

Branko Filip (born 18 March 1975) is a former Slovenian cyclist he is current coach of the men's cycling team Torku Şekerspor of Turkey.

He also coached men's cycling team of Qatar between 2012 and 2016.

== Palmares ==
1998
1st Tour of Slovenia
1999
1st National Time Trial Championships
