= Croatian Cycling Federation =

National governing body of cycle racing in Croatia

- Sport: Cycling
- Founded: 1894

Official website
- www.hbs.hr

The Croatian Cycling Federation or HBS (Croatian: Hrvatski biciklistički savez) is the national governing body of cycle racing in Croatia.

The HBS is a member of the UCI and the UEC.
