= Robert Pintarič =

Slovenian cyclist

Personal information
- Born: 25 March 1965 (age 60); Ljubljana, Yugoslavia

Robert Pintarič (born 25 March 1965) is a Slovenian cyclist. He competed in two events at the 1996 Summer Olympics.

In 2017, he married cyclist Blaža Klemenčič.
