= Boštjan Mervar =

Slovenian cyclist

Personal information
- Born: 22 September 1973 (age 53) Novo Mesto, Slovenia

Cycling career
- Sport: Cycling
- Current team: Kolesarski Klub Novo Mesto
- Discipline: Road
- Role: Rider; Directeur sportif
- Rider type: Sprinter

Professional teams
- 1997–2003: KRKA–Telekom Slovenije
- 2004: Formaggi Pinzolo Fiavè
- 2005–2006: Perutnina Ptuj

Managerial team
- 2007–: Adria Mobil

Boštjan Mervar (born 22 September 1973) is a Slovenian former professional cyclist. He now works as a directeur sportif for UCI Continental team Kolesarski Klub Novo Mesto.

== Major results ==
1996
3rd Road race, National Road Championships
1998
1st Stage 2 Uniqa Classic
2nd GP Krka
1999
1st Grand Prix Šenčur
1st Prologue Tour of Slovenia
2000
1st Stages 1 & 3 Jadranska Magistrala
2001
1st Trofeo Città di Castelfidardo
1st GP Krka
1st Stage 2 Tour of Slovenia
2nd Road race, National Road Championships
2002
1st Raiffeisen Grand Prix
1st Poreč Trophy 3
1st Stage 1 Jadranska Magistrala
1st Stage 6 Tour of Slovenia
1st Stage 2 Tour of Austria
2nd GP Krka
3rd Giro del Lago Maggiore
3rd Poreč Trophy 5
2003
1st Poreč Trophy 2
Tour of Slovenia

1st Points classification
1st Stage 6

1st Stage 1 Jadranska Magistrala
1st Stage 3 Uniqa Classic
3rd Road race, National Road Championships
2004
2nd Trofeo Città di Castelfidardo
5th Overall Circuit des Mines

1st Stage 7

2005
1st Prologue Jadranska Magistrala
1st Stage 4 Tour of Slovenia
2006
1st GP Velka cena Palma
1st GP Kranj
1st Stage 8 Vuelta a Cuba
8th GP Hydraulika Mikolasek
10th Overall Istrian Spring Trophy
