= Martin Hvastija =

Slovenian cyclist

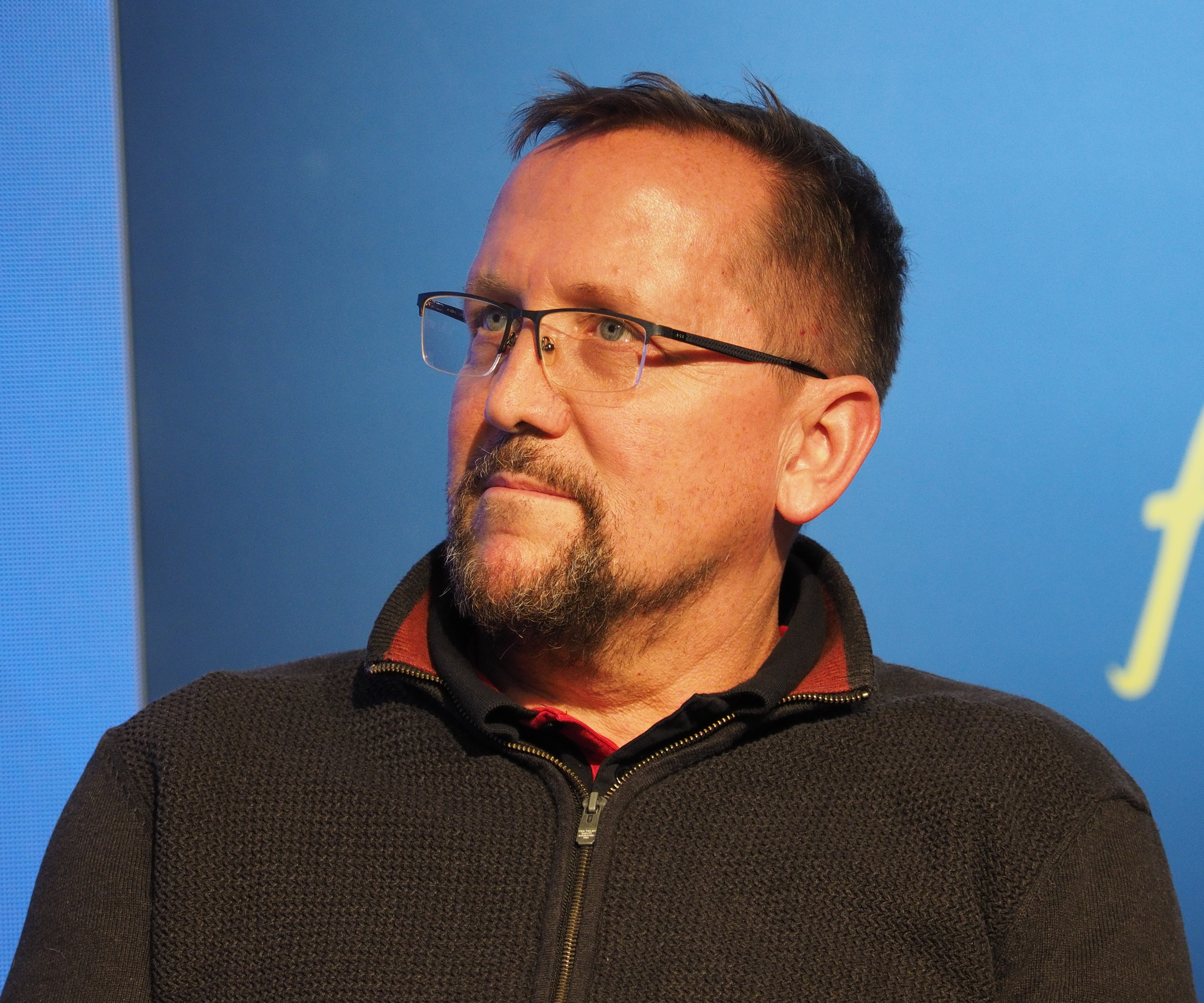

Personal information
- Born: November 30, 1969 Ljubljana, Slovenia

Cycling career
- Sport: Cycling
- Current team: Retired
- Discipline: Road
- Role: Rider

Professional teams
- 1997–1998: Cantina Tollo
- 1999–2002: Ballan–Alessio
- 2003: Tenax
- 2004: Alessio–Bianchi
- 2005: Perutnina Ptuj

Martin Hvastija (born 30 November 1969) is a Slovenian cyclist who competed at the 2000 Summer Olympics.

== Major results ==
1997
1st Stages 1, 3 & 7 Circuito Montañés
1st Overall GP Kranj
1998
1st Overall GP Kranj

1st Stage 3

1999
3rd Overall Danmark Rundt
2000
1st Poreč Trophy 4
2001
1st Stage 4 Vuelta a Andalucía
1st Omloop van de Vlaamse Scheldeboorden
3rd E3 Harelbeke
2002
5th Gent–Wevelgem
2004
1st Stage 5 Peace Race
2005
1st GP Kranj
