= Czech Cycling Federation =

National governing body of cycle racing in the Czech Republic

- Sport: Cycle sport
- Jurisdiction: Czech Republic
- Abbreviation: CSC
- Founded: 1883
- Affiliation: UCI
- Regional affiliation: UEC
- Headquarters: Prague
- Location: Nad Hliníkem 4/1186, 150 00, Prague 5, Czech Republic
- President: Petr Marek

Official website
- www.ceskysvazcyklistiky.cz
- (Czech Republic)

former CSC logo

The Czech Cycling Federation or CSC (Czech: Český svaz cyklistiky) is the national governing body of cycle racing in the Czech Republic.

The CSC is a member of the UCI and the UEC.
