= List of teams and cyclists in the 1996 Vuelta a España =

For the 1996 Vuelta a España, the field consisted of 180 riders; 115 finished the race.

== By rider ==
Legend
| No. | Starting number worn by the rider during the Vuelta |
| Pos. | Position in the general classification |
| Time | Deficit to the winner of the general classification |
| DNF | Denotes a rider who did not finish |

| No. | Name | Nationality | Team | Pos. | Time | Ref |
|---|---|---|---|---|---|---|
| 1 | Laurent Jalabert | France | ONCE | 19 | + 27' 44" | |
| 2 | Íñigo Cuesta | Spain | ONCE | 46 | + 1h 24' 14" | |
| 3 | Herminio Díaz Zabala | Spain | ONCE | 63 | + 2h 00' 57" | |
| 4 | Alberto Leanizbarrutia | Spain | ONCE | DNF | — | |
| 5 | Melcior Mauri | Spain | ONCE | 32 | + 57' 35" | |
| 6 | Oliverio Rincón | Colombia | ONCE | 49 | + 1h 27' 32" | |
| 7 | Neil Stephens | Australia | ONCE | DNF | — | |
| 8 | Mikel Zarrabeitia | Spain | ONCE | 31 | + 50' 29" | |
| 9 | Alex Zülle | Switzerland | ONCE | 1 | 97h 31' 46" | |
| 11 | Dimitri Konyshev | Russia | Aki–Gipiemme | 35 | + 1h 06' 03" | |
| 12 | Stefano Faustini | Italy | Aki–Gipiemme | 5 | + 11' 21" | |
| 13 | Giuseppe Citterio | Italy | Aki–Gipiemme | 107 | + 3h 10' 10" | |
| 14 | Luca Colombo | Italy | Aki–Gipiemme | DNF | — | |
| 15 | Denis Zanette | Italy | Aki–Gipiemme | 71 | + 2h 24' 01" | |
| 16 | Gianluca Gorini | Italy | Aki–Gipiemme | DNF | — | |
| 17 | Franco Vona | Italy | Aki–Gipiemme | 104 | + 3h 06' 49" | |
| 18 | Luca Pavanello | Italy | Aki–Gipiemme | 81 | + 2h 39' 18" | |
| 19 | Roberto Dal Sie | Italy | Aki–Gipiemme | 68 | + 2h 15' 40" | |
| 21 | Miguel Induráin | Spain | Banesto | DNF | — | |
| 22 | Ángel Casero | Spain | Banesto | 24 | + 35' 09" | |
| 23 | Santiago Blanco | Spain | Banesto | 33 | + 1h 02' 28" | |
| 24 | Erwin Nijboer | Netherlands | Banesto | DNF | — | |
| 25 | Ramón González Arrieta | Spain | Banesto | 26 | + 41' 35" | |
| 26 | José María Jiménez | Spain | Banesto | 12 | + 20' 19" | |
| 27 | Vicente Aparicio | Spain | Banesto | DNF | — | |
| 28 | Orlando Rodrigues | Portugal | Banesto | 34 | + 1h 03' 50" | |
| 29 | Marino Alonso | Spain | Banesto | 57 | + 1h 51' 42" | |
| 31 | Stefano Dante | Italy | Cantina Tollo–Co.Bo. | 111 | + 3h 29' 56" | |
| 32 | Marco Antonio Di Renzo | Italy | Cantina Tollo–Co.Bo. | 102 | + 3h 05' 33" | |
| 33 | Massimiliano Gentili | Italy | Cantina Tollo–Co.Bo. | DNF | — | |
| 34 | Andrea Paluan | Italy | Cantina Tollo–Co.Bo. | 93 | + 2h 57' 47" | |
| 35 | Germano Pierdomenico | Italy | Cantina Tollo–Co.Bo. | DNF | — | |
| 36 | Martin Hvastija | Slovenia | Cantina Tollo–Co.Bo. | 99 | + 3h 01' 02" | |
| 37 | Lorenzo Di Silvestro | Italy | Cantina Tollo–Co.Bo. | 105 | + 3h 07' 28" | |
| 38 | Yuri Recanati | Italy | Cantina Tollo–Co.Bo. | 112 | + 3h 33' 19" | |
| 39 | Paolo Valoti | Italy | Cantina Tollo–Co.Bo. | 74 | + 2h 26' 00" | |
| 41 | David García | Spain | Equipo Euskadi | DNF | — | |
| 42 | Álvaro González de Galdeano | Spain | Equipo Euskadi | 62 | + 1h 59' 39" | |
| 43 | César Solaun | Spain | Equipo Euskadi | 38 | + 1h 08' 00" | |
| 44 | Óscar López Uriarte | Spain | Equipo Euskadi | 70 | + 2h 22' 09" | |
| 45 | Igor González de Galdeano | Spain | Equipo Euskadi | 106 | + 3h 09' 15" | |
| 46 | Asier Guenetxea | Spain | Equipo Euskadi | 95 | + 2h 58' 44" | |
| 47 | Roberto Laiseka | Spain | Equipo Euskadi | 79 | + 2h 38' 42" | |
| 48 | Iñigo González de Heredia | Spain | Equipo Euskadi | DNF | — | |
| 49 | Iñaki Ayarzaguena Urkidi | Spain | Equipo Euskadi | 28 | + 45' 52" | |
| 51 | Vladislav Bobrik | Russia | Gewiss Playbus | 16 | + 26' 00" | |
| 52 | Nicola Minali | Italy | Gewiss Playbus | 96 | + 2h 58' 49" | |
| 53 | Stefano Zanini | Italy | Gewiss Playbus | 64 | + 2h 03' 08" | |
| 54 | Mauro-Antonio Santaromita | Italy | Gewiss Playbus | DNF | — | |
| 55 | Ermanno Brignoli | Italy | Gewiss Playbus | 97 | + 2h 59' 42" | |
| 56 | Jon Odriozola | Spain | Gewiss Playbus | 75 | + 2h 28' 06" | |
| 57 | Dario Bottaro | Italy | Gewiss Playbus | DNF | — | |
| 58 | Ivan Cerioli | Italy | Gewiss Playbus | DNF | — | |
| 59 | Andrea Brognara | Italy | Gewiss Playbus | 110 | + 3h 27' 05" | |
| 61 | Fernando Escartín | Spain | Kelme–Artiach | 10 | + 18' 35" | |
| 62 | Hernán Buenahora | Colombia | Kelme–Artiach | DNF | — | |
| 63 | Francisco Cabello | Spain | Kelme–Artiach | 94 | + 2h 58' 42" | |
| 64 | Ignacio García Camacho | Spain | Kelme–Artiach | 91 | + 2h 47' 31" | |
| 65 | Marcos-Antonio Serrano | Spain | Kelme–Artiach | 11 | + 19' 19" | |
| 66 | Santos González | Spain | Kelme–Artiach | 51 | + 1h 36' 11" | |
| 67 | Juan Carlos Domínguez | Spain | Kelme–Artiach | 72 | + 2h 25' 09" | |
| 68 | José Luis Rodriguez Garcia | Spain | Kelme–Artiach | 65 | + 2h 04' 51" | |
| 69 | Ángel Edo | Spain | Kelme–Artiach | 85 | + 2h 44' 08" | |
| 71 | Laurent Dufaux | Switzerland | Festina–Lotus | 2 | + 6' 23" | |
| 72 | Juan Rodrigo Arenas Gonzalez | Spain | Festina–Lotus | 53 | + 1h 41' 44" | |
| 73 | Stéphane Goubert | France | Festina–Lotus | DNF | — | |
| 74 | Stephen Hodge | Australia | Festina–Lotus | 76 | + 2h 34' 06" | |
| 75 | Fabian Jeker | Switzerland | Festina–Lotus | 22 | + 32' 21" | |
| 76 | Lylian Lebreton | France | Festina–Lotus | DNF | — | |
| 77 | David Plaza | Spain | Festina–Lotus | 66 | + 2h 05' 10" | |
| 78 | Yvan Martin | France | Festina–Lotus | DNF | — | |
| 79 | Valerio Tebaldi | Italy | Festina–Lotus | 50 | + 1h 28' 41" | |
| 81 | Manuel Luis Abreu Campos | Portugal | Maia-Jumbo-CIN | 42 | + 1h 16' 19" | |
| 82 | Joaquim Andrade | Portugal | Maia-Jumbo-CIN | 82 | + 2h 40' 26" | |
| 83 | José Azevedo | Portugal | Maia-Jumbo-CIN | DNF | — | |
| 84 | Paulo Barroso | Portugal | Maia-Jumbo-CIN | DNF | — | |
| 85 | Ricardo Felgueiras | Portugal | Maia-Jumbo-CIN | DNF | — | |
| 86 | Paulo Ferreira | Portugal | Maia-Jumbo-CIN | DNF | — | |
| 87 | Joaquim Sampaio | Portugal | Maia-Jumbo-CIN | DNF | — | |
| 88 | João Silva | Portugal | Maia-Jumbo-CIN | DNF | — | |
| 89 | Manuel Rodríguez | Spain | Maia-Jumbo-CIN | DNF | — | |
| 91 | Tony Rominger | Switzerland | Mapei–GB | 3 | + 8' 29" | |
| 92 | Arsenio González | Spain | Mapei–GB | 36 | + 1h 06' 14" | |
| 93 | Francisco Javier Mauleón | Spain | Mapei–GB | 18 | + 27' 38" | |
| 94 | Gianluca Bortolami | Italy | Mapei–GB | DNF | — | |
| 95 | Jon Unzaga | Spain | Mapei–GB | DNF | — | |
| 96 | Bart Leysen | Belgium | Mapei–GB | 77 | + 2h 35' 13" | |
| 97 | Miguel Ángel Peña | Spain | Mapei–GB | DNF | — | |
| 98 | Daniele Nardello | Italy | Mapei–GB | 15 | + 22' 37" | |
| 99 | Tom Steels | Belgium | Mapei–GB | 86 | + 2h 44' 50" | |
| 101 | Fabio Baldato | Italy | MG Maglificio–Technogym | DNF | — | |
| 102 | Gianni Bugno | Italy | MG Maglificio–Technogym | 56 | + 1h 47' 09" | |
| 103 | Nicola Loda | Italy | MG Maglificio–Technogym | DNF | — | |
| 104 | Rolf Järmann | Switzerland | MG Maglificio–Technogym | DNF | — | |
| 105 | Angelo Lecchi | Italy | MG Maglificio–Technogym | 27 | + 44' 12" | |
| 106 | Marco Lietti | Italy | MG Maglificio–Technogym | 37 | + 1h 07' 01" | |
| 107 | Maurizio Molinari | Italy | MG Maglificio–Technogym | DNF | — | |
| 108 | Roberto Pistore | Italy | MG Maglificio–Technogym | 4 | + 10' 23" | |
| 109 | Lorenzo Ferdeghini | Italy | MG Maglificio–Technogym | DNF | — | |
| 111 | Bobby Julich | United States | Motorola | 9 | + 15' 10" | |
| 112 | Kevin Livingston | United States | Motorola | 61 | + 1h 53' 21" | |
| 113 | Axel Merckx | Belgium | Motorola | 17 | + 27' 34" | |
| 114 | Jesús Montoya | Spain | Motorola | DNF | — | |
| 115 | Kaspars Ozers | Latvia | Motorola | DNF | — | |
| 116 | Andrea Peron | Italy | Motorola | 8 | + 14' 46" | |
| 117 | Max Sciandri | Great Britain | Motorola | DNF | — | |
| 118 | Max van Heeswijk | Netherlands | Motorola | DNF | — | |
| 119 | Flavio Vanzella | Italy | Motorola | DNF | — | |
| 121 | Marcel Wüst | Germany | MX Onda | DNF | — | |
| 122 | Tom Cordes | Netherlands | MX Onda | 103 | + 3h 06' 19" | |
| 123 | Claus Michael Møller | Denmark | MX Onda | 45 | + 1h 23' 40" | |
| 124 | Vítor Gamito | Portugal | MX Onda | DNF | — | |
| 125 | Francisco Cerezo | Spain | MX Onda | 39 | + 1h 10' 24" | |
| 126 | Eleuterio Anguita | Spain | MX Onda | 59 | + 1h 52' 20" | |
| 127 | Juan Carlos Vicario | Spain | MX Onda | DNF | — | |
| 128 | José Antonio Espinosa Hernández | Spain | MX Onda | DNF | — | |
| 129 | Daniel Clavero | Spain | MX Onda | 14 | + 21' 49" | |
| 131 | Armand de Las Cuevas | France | Petit Casino | DNF | — | |
| 132 | Christophe Agnolutto | France | Petit Casino | 90 | + 2h 46' 39" | |
| 133 | Martial Locatelli | France | Petit Casino | 83 | + 2h 43' 05" | |
| 134 | Frédéric Bessy | France | Petit Casino | DNF | — | |
| 135 | Pascal Chanteur | France | Petit Casino | 21 | + 31' 21" | |
| 136 | Fabrice Gougot | France | Petit Casino | 30 | + 47' 16" | |
| 137 | Artūras Kasputis | Lithuania | Petit Casino | DNF | — | |
| 138 | Jaan Kirsipuu | Estonia | Petit Casino | DNF | — | |
| 139 | Christophe Mengin | France | Petit Casino | DNF | — | |
| 141 | Davide Rebellin | Italy | Team Polti | 7 | + 13' 15" | |
| 142 | Mauro Gianetti | Switzerland | Team Polti | 13 | + 21' 15" | |
| 143 | Giovanni Lombardi | Italy | Team Polti | DNF | — | |
| 144 | Georg Totschnig | Austria | Team Polti | 6 | + 11' 33" | |
| 145 | Serguei Outschakov | Ukraine | Team Polti | DNF | — | |
| 146 | Iñigo Chaurreau | Spain | Team Polti | 29 | + 46' 04" | |
| 147 | Mirko Crepaldi | Italy | Team Polti | DNF | — | |
| 148 | Mirko Celestino | Italy | Team Polti | 73 | + 2h 25' 13" | |
| 149 | Leonardo Calzavara | Italy | Team Polti | 109 | + 3h 17' 39" | |
| 151 | Francesco Casagrande | Italy | Saeco–AS Juvenes San Marino | DNF | — | |
| 152 | Giorgio Furlan | Italy | Saeco–AS Juvenes San Marino | 43 | + 1h 17' 43" | |
| 153 | Angelo Canzonieri | Italy | Saeco–AS Juvenes San Marino | 54 | + 1h 43' 04" | |
| 154 | Eddy Mazzoleni | Italy | Saeco–AS Juvenes San Marino | DNF | — | |
| 155 | Antonio Politano | Italy | Saeco–AS Juvenes San Marino | 88 | + 2h 46' 00" | |
| 156 | Antonio Sánchez García | Spain | Saeco–AS Juvenes San Marino | 52 | + 1h 40' 07" | |
| 157 | Manuel Pascual | Spain | Saeco–AS Juvenes San Marino | 47 | + 1h 24' 49" | |
| 158 | Massimiliano Lelli | Italy | Saeco–AS Juvenes San Marino | DNF | — | |
| 159 | Massimiliano Mori | Italy | Saeco–AS Juvenes San Marino | 89 | + 2h 46' 08" | |
| 161 | Romes Gainetdinov | Russia | Santa Clara | 55 | + 1h 45' 24" | |
| 162 | Oscar Aranguren Armino | Spain | Santa Clara | 113 | + 3h 36' 30" | |
| 163 | Jonathan Vaughters | United States | Santa Clara | DNF | — | |
| 164 | Chann McRae | United States | Santa Clara | 108 | + 3h 10' 23" | |
| 165 | Joaquín Migueláñez Arribas | Spain | Santa Clara | 114 | + 3h 44' 37" | |
| 166 | Javier Pascual Rodríguez | Spain | Santa Clara | 48 | + 1h 25' 34" | |
| 167 | Javier Pascual Llorente | Spain | Santa Clara | 69 | + 2h 16' 22" | |
| 168 | Serguei Smetanine | Russia | Santa Clara | 92 | + 2h 55' 34" | |
| 169 | Andrei Zintchenko | Russia | Santa Clara | 41 | + 1h 14' 30" | |
| 171 | Andrea Vatteroni | Italy | Scrigno–Blue Storm | DNF | — | |
| 172 | Davide Casarotto | Italy | Scrigno–Blue Storm | DNF | — | |
| 173 | Mirko Rossato | Italy | Scrigno–Blue Storm | DNF | — | |
| 174 | Daniele Cignali | Italy | Scrigno–Blue Storm | 60 | + 1h 52' 31" | |
| 175 | Sauro Gallorini | Italy | Scrigno–Blue Storm | 87 | + 2h 45' 42" | |
| 176 | Alessio Barbagli | Italy | Scrigno–Blue Storm | DNF | — | |
| 177 | Biagio Conte | Italy | Scrigno–Blue Storm | DNF | — | |
| 178 | Massimo Apollonio | Italy | Scrigno–Blue Storm | 25 | + 37' 48" | |
| 179 | Alessandro Petacchi | Italy | Scrigno–Blue Storm | 101 | + 3h 02' 16" | |
| 181 | Michael Andersson | Sweden | Team Telekom | DNF | — | |
| 182 | Bert Dietz | Germany | Team Telekom | DNF | — | |
| 183 | Mario Kummer | Germany | Team Telekom | 84 | + 2h 43' 35" | |
| 184 | Peter Meinert Nielsen | Denmark | Team Telekom | 20 | + 29' 56" | |
| 185 | Steffen Wesemann | Germany | Team Telekom | 80 | + 2h 39' 05" | |
| 186 | Gerd Audehm | Germany | Team Telekom | 58 | + 1h 52' 06" | |
| 187 | Kai Hundertmarck | Germany | Team Telekom | 23 | + 32' 28" | |
| 188 | Michel Lafis | Sweden | Team Telekom | DNF | — | |
| 189 | Jürgen Werner | Germany | Team Telekom | 67 | + 2h 08' 16" | |
| 191 | Maarten den Bakker | Netherlands | TVM–Farm Frites | 40 | + 1h 13' 02" | |
| 192 | Bo Hamburger | Denmark | TVM–Farm Frites | 44 | + 1h 19' 12" | |
| 193 | Tristan Hoffman | Netherlands | TVM–Farm Frites | 78 | + 2h 37' 35" | |
| 194 | Lars Kristian Johnsen | Norway | TVM–Farm Frites | 98 | + 3h 00' 40" | |
| 195 | Hendrik Redant | Belgium | TVM–Farm Frites | 115 | + 3h 52' 40" | |
| 196 | Jeroen Blijlevens | Netherlands | TVM–Farm Frites | 100 | + 3h 01' 32" | |
| 197 | Vladimir Poulnikov | Ukraine | TVM–Farm Frites | DNF | — | |
| 198 | Jesper Skibby | Denmark | TVM–Farm Frites | DNF | — | |
| 199 | Bart Voskamp | Netherlands | TVM–Farm Frites | DNF | — | |
