= 1996 Vuelta a España, Stage 12 to Stage 22 =

Cycling race stages

The 1996 Vuelta a España was the 51st edition of the Vuelta a España, one of cycling's Grand Tours. The Vuelta began in Valencia on 7 September, and Stage 12 occurred on 19 September with a stage from Benavente. The race finished in Madrid on 29 September.

== Stage 12 ==
19 September 1996 — Benavente to Alto del Naranco, 188 km (117 mi)

Stage 12 result

Rank	Rider	Team	Time
1	Daniele Nardello (ITA)	Mapei–GB	4h 30' 12"
2	Andrea Peron (ITA)	Motorola	s.t.
3	Peter Meinert Nielsen (DEN)	Team Telekom	+ 14"
4	Angelo Canzonieri (ITA)	Saeco–AS Juvenes San Marino	+ 22"
5	Alex Zülle (SUI)	ONCE	+ 2' 26"
6	Laurent Jalabert (FRA)	ONCE	+ 2' 31"
7	Tony Rominger (SUI)	Mapei–GB	+ 2' 33"
8	Roberto Pistore (ITA)	MG Maglificio–Technogym	s.t.
9	Laurent Dufaux (SUI)	Festina–Lotus	s.t.
10	Davide Rebellin (ITA)	Team Polti	+ 2' 39"

General classification after Stage 12

Rank	Rider	Team	Time
1	Alex Zülle (SUI)	ONCE	52h 17' 32"
2	Laurent Jalabert (FRA)	ONCE	+ 1' 17"
3	Miguel Induráin (ESP)	Banesto	+ 2' 04"
4	Melcior Mauri (ESP)	ONCE	+ 3' 09"
5	Neil Stephens (AUS)	ONCE	+ 3' 55"
6	Roberto Pistore (ITA)	MG Maglificio–Technogym	+ 4' 07"
7	Laurent Dufaux (SUI)	Festina–Lotus	+ 4' 31"
8	Stefano Faustini (ITA)	Aki–Gipiemme	+ 5' 47"
9	Mikel Zarrabeitia (ESP)	ONCE	+ 6' 30"
10	Bobby Julich (USA)	Motorola	+ 6' 43"

== Stage 13 ==
20 September 1996 — Oviedo to Lakes of Covadonga, 159 km (99 mi)

Stage 13 result

Rank	Rider	Team	Time
1	Laurent Jalabert (FRA)	ONCE	4h 01' 48"
2	Alex Zülle (SUI)	ONCE	s.t.
3	Mauro Gianetti (SUI)	Team Polti	+ 15"
4	Tony Rominger (SUI)	Mapei–GB	+ 25"
5	Georg Totschnig (AUT)	Team Polti	s.t.
6	Marcos-Antonio Serrano (ESP)	Kelme–Artiach	s.t.
7	Davide Rebellin (ITA)	Team Polti	s.t.
8	Stefano Faustini (ITA)	Aki–Gipiemme	+ 31"
9	Laurent Dufaux (SUI)	Festina–Lotus	+ 45"
10	Daniel Clavero (ESP)	MX Onda	+ 1' 32"

General classification after Stage 13

Rank	Rider	Team	Time
1	Alex Zülle (SUI)	ONCE	56h 19' 12"
2	Laurent Jalabert (FRA)	ONCE	+ 1' 13"
3	Laurent Dufaux (SUI)	Festina–Lotus	+ 5' 24"
4	Stefano Faustini (ITA)	Aki–Gipiemme	+ 6' 26"
5	Melcior Mauri (ESP)	ONCE	+ 6' 51"
6	Roberto Pistore (ITA)	MG Maglificio–Technogym	+ 6' 54"
7	Davide Rebellin (ITA)	Team Polti	+ 7' 28"
8	Georg Totschnig (AUT)	Team Polti	+ 8' 02"
9	Tony Rominger (SUI)	Mapei–GB	+ 8' 41"
10	Neil Stephens (AUS)	ONCE	+ 8' 46"

== Stage 14 ==
21 September 1996 — Cangas de Onís to Cabarceno Natural Park, 202.6 km (125.9 mi)

Stage 14 result

Rank	Rider	Team	Time
1	Biagio Conte (ITA)	Scrigno–Blue Storm	4h 48' 14"
2	Orlando Rodrigues (POR)	Banesto	s.t.
3	Laurent Dufaux (SUI)	Festina–Lotus	+ 1' 57"
4	Laurent Jalabert (FRA)	ONCE	s.t.
5	Alex Zülle (SUI)	ONCE	s.t.
6	Tony Rominger (SUI)	Mapei–GB	s.t.
7	Marcos-Antonio Serrano (ESP)	Kelme–Artiach	s.t.
8	Davide Rebellin (ITA)	Team Polti	s.t.
9	Roberto Pistore (ITA)	MG Maglificio–Technogym	s.t.
10	Fernando Escartín (ESP)	Kelme–Artiach	s.t.

General classification after Stage 14

Rank	Rider	Team	Time
1	Alex Zülle (SUI)	ONCE	61h 09' 23"
2	Laurent Jalabert (FRA)	ONCE	+ 1' 13"
3	Laurent Dufaux (SUI)	Festina–Lotus	+ 5' 20"
4	Stefano Faustini (ITA)	Aki–Gipiemme	+ 6' 33"
5	Roberto Pistore (ITA)	MG Maglificio–Technogym	+ 6' 54"
6	Melcior Mauri (ESP)	ONCE	+ 7' 23"
7	Davide Rebellin (ITA)	Team Polti	+ 7' 28"
8	Georg Totschnig (AUT)	Team Polti	+ 8' 09"
9	Tony Rominger (SUI)	Mapei–GB	+ 8' 41"
10	Neil Stephens (AUS)	ONCE	+ 8' 53"

== Stage 15 ==
22 September 1996 — Cabárceno to Alto Cruz de la Demanda (Ezcaray), 220 km (140 mi)

Stage 15 result

Rank	Rider	Team	Time
1	Alex Zülle (SUI)	ONCE	5h 48' 30"
2	Laurent Dufaux (SUI)	Festina–Lotus	+ 2"
3	Laurent Jalabert (FRA)	ONCE	s.t.
4	Tony Rominger (SUI)	Mapei–GB	s.t.
5	Roberto Pistore (ITA)	MG Maglificio–Technogym	+ 8"
6	José María Jiménez (ESP)	Banesto	s.t.
7	Marcos-Antonio Serrano (ESP)	Kelme–Artiach	+ 15"
8	Davide Rebellin (ITA)	Team Polti	s.t.
9	Fernando Escartín (ESP)	Kelme–Artiach	s.t.
10	Georg Totschnig (AUT)	Team Polti	s.t.

General classification after Stage 15

Rank	Rider	Team	Time
1	Alex Zülle (SUI)	ONCE	66h 57' 41"
2	Laurent Jalabert (FRA)	ONCE	+ 1' 13"
3	Laurent Dufaux (SUI)	Festina–Lotus	+ 5' 26"
4	Roberto Pistore (ITA)	MG Maglificio–Technogym	+ 7' 14"
5	Stefano Faustini (ITA)	Aki–Gipiemme	+ 7' 22"
6	Davide Rebellin (ITA)	Team Polti	+ 7' 55"
7	Georg Totschnig (AUT)	Team Polti	+ 8' 36"
8	Melcior Mauri (ESP)	ONCE	+ 8' 45"
9	Tony Rominger (SUI)	Mapei–GB	+ 8' 55"
10	Neil Stephens (AUS)	ONCE	+ 9' 20"

== Stage 16 ==
23 September 1996 — Logroño to Sabiñánigo, 220.9 km (137.3 mi)

Stage 16 result

Rank	Rider	Team	Time
1	Nicola Minali (ITA)	Gewiss Playbus	5h 34' 38"
2	Steffen Wesemann (GER)	Team Telekom	s.t.
3	Serguei Smetanine (RUS)	Santa Clara	s.t.
4	Marcel Wüst (GER)	MX Onda	s.t.
5	Tom Steels (BEL)	Mapei–GB	s.t.
6	Biagio Conte (ITA)	Scrigno–Blue Storm	s.t.
7	Martin Hvastija (SLO)	Cantina Tollo–Co.Bo.	s.t.
8	Paolo Valoti (ITA)	Cantina Tollo–Co.Bo.	s.t.
9	Denis Zanette (ITA)	Aki–Gipiemme	s.t.
10	Marco Antonio Di Renzo (ITA)	Cantina Tollo–Co.Bo.	s.t.

General classification after Stage 16

Rank	Rider	Team	Time
1	Alex Zülle (SUI)	ONCE	72h 32' 19"
2	Laurent Jalabert (FRA)	ONCE	+ 1' 23"
3	Laurent Dufaux (SUI)	Festina–Lotus	+ 5' 26"
4	Roberto Pistore (ITA)	MG Maglificio–Technogym	+ 7' 14"
5	Stefano Faustini (ITA)	Aki–Gipiemme	+ 7' 22"
6	Davide Rebellin (ITA)	Team Polti	+ 7' 55"
7	Georg Totschnig (AUT)	Team Polti	+ 8' 36"
8	Melcior Mauri (ESP)	ONCE	+ 8' 45"
9	Tony Rominger (SUI)	Mapei–GB	+ 8' 55"
10	Neil Stephens (AUS)	ONCE	+ 9' 20"

== Stage 17 ==
24 September 1996 — Sabiñánigo to Cerler, 165.7 km (103.0 mi)

Stage 17 result

Rank	Rider	Team	Time
1	Oliverio Rincón (COL)	ONCE	4h 11' 54"
2	Laurent Jalabert (FRA)	ONCE	+ 37"
3	Laurent Dufaux (SUI)	Festina–Lotus	s.t.
4	Tony Rominger (SUI)	Mapei–GB	+ 38"
5	Roberto Pistore (ITA)	MG Maglificio–Technogym	+ 40"
6	Georg Totschnig (AUT)	Team Polti	s.t.
7	Alex Zülle (SUI)	ONCE	+ 42"
8	José María Jiménez (ESP)	Banesto	s.t.
9	Marcos-Antonio Serrano (ESP)	Kelme–Artiach	s.t.
10	Fernando Escartín (ESP)	Kelme–Artiach	s.t.

General classification after Stage 17

Rank	Rider	Team	Time
1	Alex Zülle (SUI)	ONCE	76h 44' 45"
2	Laurent Jalabert (FRA)	ONCE	+ 1' 10"
3	Laurent Dufaux (SUI)	Festina–Lotus	+ 5' 17"
4	Roberto Pistore (ITA)	MG Maglificio–Technogym	+ 7' 12"
5	Georg Totschnig (AUT)	Team Polti	+ 8' 34"
6	Tony Rominger (SUI)	Mapei–GB	+ 8' 51"
7	Stefano Faustini (ITA)	Aki–Gipiemme	+ 9' 09"
8	Davide Rebellin (ITA)	Team Polti	+ 9' 42"
9	Melcior Mauri (ESP)	ONCE	+ 10' 32"
10	Bobby Julich (USA)	Motorola	+ 12' 47"

== Stage 18 ==
25 September 1996 — Benasque to Zaragoza, 219.5 km (136.4 mi)

Stage 18 result

Rank	Rider	Team	Time
1	Dimitri Konyshev (RUS)	Aki–Gipiemme	5h 41' 24"
2	Bo Hamburger (DEN)	TVM–Farm Frites	s.t.
3	Gianni Bugno (ITA)	MG Maglificio–Technogym	s.t.
4	Paolo Valoti (ITA)	Cantina Tollo–Co.Bo.	+ 2"
5	Serguei Smetanine (RUS)	Santa Clara	+ 5' 07"
6	Pascal Chanteur (FRA)	Petit Casino	s.t.
7	Giuseppe Citterio (ITA)	Aki–Gipiemme	s.t.
8	Luca Pavanello (ITA)	Aki–Gipiemme	s.t.
9	Oscar Aranguren Armino (ESP)	Santa Clara	s.t.
10	Alessandro Petacchi (ITA)	Scrigno–Blue Storm	s.t.

General classification after Stage 18

Rank	Rider	Team	Time
1	Alex Zülle (SUI)	ONCE	82h 31' 26"
2	Laurent Jalabert (FRA)	ONCE	+ 1' 10"
3	Laurent Dufaux (SUI)	Festina–Lotus	+ 5' 17"
4	Roberto Pistore (ITA)	MG Maglificio–Technogym	+ 7' 12"
5	Georg Totschnig (AUT)	Team Polti	+ 8' 34"
6	Tony Rominger (SUI)	Mapei–GB	+ 8' 51"
7	Stefano Faustini (ITA)	Aki–Gipiemme	+ 9' 09"
8	Davide Rebellin (ITA)	Team Polti	+ 9' 42"
9	Melcior Mauri (ESP)	ONCE	+ 10' 32"
10	Bobby Julich (USA)	Motorola	+ 12' 47"

== Stage 19 ==
26 September 1996 — Getafe to Ávila, 217.1 km (134.9 mi)

Stage 19 result

Rank	Rider	Team	Time
1	Laurent Dufaux (SUI)	Festina–Lotus	4h 58' 09"
2	Daniele Nardello (ITA)	Mapei–GB	+ 7"
3	Andrea Peron (ITA)	Motorola	s.t.
4	José María Jiménez (ESP)	Banesto	+ 14"
5	Roberto Pistore (ITA)	MG Maglificio–Technogym	+ 43"
6	Pascal Chanteur (FRA)	Petit Casino	s.t.
7	Tony Rominger (SUI)	Mapei–GB	s.t.
8	Stefano Faustini (ITA)	Aki–Gipiemme	s.t.
9	Marcos-Antonio Serrano (ESP)	Kelme–Artiach	s.t.
10	Alex Zülle (SUI)	ONCE	s.t.

General classification after Stage 19

Rank	Rider	Team	Time
1	Alex Zülle (SUI)	ONCE	87h 30' 18"
2	Laurent Dufaux (SUI)	Festina–Lotus	+ 4' 22"
3	Roberto Pistore (ITA)	MG Maglificio–Technogym	+ 7' 10"
4	Georg Totschnig (AUT)	Team Polti	+ 8' 34"
5	Tony Rominger (SUI)	Mapei–GB	+ 8' 51"
6	Stefano Faustini (ITA)	Aki–Gipiemme	+ 9' 09"
7	Davide Rebellin (ITA)	Team Polti	+ 9' 42"
8	Andrea Peron (ITA)	Motorola	+ 12' 25"
9	Bobby Julich (USA)	Motorola	+ 12' 47"
10	Daniel Clavero (ESP)	MX Onda	+ 15' 02"

== Stage 20 ==
27 September 1996 — Ávila to Palazuelos de Eresma (Destilerías DYC), 209.5 km (130.2 mi)

Stage 20 result

Rank	Rider	Team	Time
1	Gianni Bugno (ITA)	MG Maglificio–Technogym	4h 58' 09"
2	Tony Rominger (SUI)	Mapei–GB	+ 7"
3	Massimo Apollonio (ITA)	Scrigno–Blue Storm	+ 8"
4	Kai Hundertmarck (GER)	Team Telekom	s.t.
5	Laurent Dufaux (SUI)	Festina–Lotus	s.t.
6	Alex Zülle (SUI)	ONCE	s.t.
7	Bobby Julich (USA)	Motorola	s.t.
8	Davide Rebellin (ITA)	Team Polti	s.t.
9	Stefano Faustini (ITA)	Aki–Gipiemme	+ 11"
10	Roberto Pistore (ITA)	MG Maglificio–Technogym	s.t.

General classification after Stage 20

Rank	Rider	Team	Time
1	Alex Zülle (SUI)	ONCE	92h 44' 29"
2	Laurent Dufaux (SUI)	Festina–Lotus	+ 4' 22"
3	Roberto Pistore (ITA)	MG Maglificio–Technogym	+ 7' 13"
4	Georg Totschnig (AUT)	Team Polti	+ 8' 37"
5	Tony Rominger (SUI)	Mapei–GB	+ 8' 42"
6	Stefano Faustini (ITA)	Aki–Gipiemme	+ 9' 12"
7	Davide Rebellin (ITA)	Team Polti	+ 9' 42"
8	Andrea Peron (ITA)	Motorola	+ 12' 28"
9	Bobby Julich (USA)	Motorola	+ 12' 47"
10	José María Jiménez (ESP)	Banesto	+ 15' 23"

== Stage 21 ==
28 September 1996 — Segovia to Palazuelos de Eresma (Destilerías DYC), 43 km (27 mi) (ITT)

Stage 21 result

Rank	Rider	Team	Time
1	Tony Rominger (SUI)	Mapei–GB	53' 37"
2	Alex Zülle (SUI)	ONCE	+ 13"
3	Laurent Jalabert (FRA)	ONCE	+ 1' 47"
4	Daniele Nardello (ITA)	Mapei–GB	+ 2' 07"
5	Laurent Dufaux (SUI)	Festina–Lotus	+ 2' 14"
6	Stefano Faustini (ITA)	Aki–Gipiemme	+ 2' 22"
7	Ángel Casero (ESP)	Banesto	+ 2' 23"
8	Santos González (ESP)	Kelme–Artiach	+ 2' 25"
9	Andrea Peron (ITA)	Motorola	+ 2' 31"
10	Bobby Julich (USA)	Motorola	+ 2' 36"

General classification after Stage 21

Rank	Rider	Team	Time
1	Alex Zülle (SUI)	ONCE	93h 38' 19"
2	Laurent Dufaux (SUI)	Festina–Lotus	+ 6' 23"
3	Tony Rominger (SUI)	Mapei–GB	+ 8' 29"
4	Roberto Pistore (ITA)	MG Maglificio–Technogym	+ 10' 13"
5	Stefano Faustini (ITA)	Aki–Gipiemme	+ 11' 21"
6	Georg Totschnig (AUT)	Team Polti	+ 11' 33"
7	Davide Rebellin (ITA)	Team Polti	+ 13' 15"
8	Andrea Peron (ITA)	Motorola	+ 14' 46"
9	Bobby Julich (USA)	Motorola	+ 15' 10"
10	Fernando Escartín (ESP)	Kelme–Artiach	+ 18' 35"

== Stage 22 ==
29 September 1996 — Madrid to Madrid, 157.6 km (97.9 mi)

Stage 22 result

Rank	Rider	Team	Time
1	Tom Steels (BEL)	Mapei–GB	3h 53' 27"
2	Nicola Minali (ITA)	Gewiss Playbus	s.t.
3	Steffen Wesemann (GER)	Team Telekom	s.t.
4	Laurent Jalabert (FRA)	ONCE	s.t.
5	Ángel Edo (ESP)	Kelme–Artiach	s.t.
6	Giuseppe Citterio (ITA)	Aki–Gipiemme	s.t.
7	Asier Guenetxea (ESP)	Equipo Euskadi	s.t.
8	Alessandro Petacchi (ITA)	Scrigno–Blue Storm	s.t.
9	Serguei Smetanine (RUS)	Santa Clara	s.t.
10	Hendrik Redant (BEL)	TVM–Farm Frites	s.t.

General classification after Stage 22

Rank	Rider	Team	Time
1	Alex Zülle (SUI)	ONCE	97h 31' 46"
2	Laurent Dufaux (SUI)	Festina–Lotus	+ 6' 23"
3	Tony Rominger (SUI)	Mapei–GB	+ 8' 29"
4	Roberto Pistore (ITA)	MG Maglificio–Technogym	+ 10' 13"
5	Stefano Faustini (ITA)	Aki–Gipiemme	+ 11' 21"
6	Georg Totschnig (AUT)	Team Polti	+ 11' 33"
7	Davide Rebellin (ITA)	Team Polti	+ 13' 15"
8	Andrea Peron (ITA)	Motorola	+ 14' 46"
9	Bobby Julich (USA)	Motorola	+ 15' 10"
10	Fernando Escartín (ESP)	Kelme–Artiach	+ 18' 35"
