= 1996 Vuelta a España, Stage 1 to Stage 11 =

Cycling race stages

The 1996 Vuelta a España was the 51st edition of the Vuelta a España, one of cycling's Grand Tours. The Vuelta began in Valencia on 7 September, and Stage 11 occurred on 18 September with a stage to Salamanca. The race finished in Madrid on 29 September.

== Stage 1 ==
7 September 1996 — Valencia to Valencia, 162 km (101 mi)

Stage 1 result

Rank	Rider	Team	Time
1	Biagio Conte (ITA)	Scrigno–Blue Storm	3h 52' 27"
2	Tom Steels (BEL)	Mapei–GB	s.t.
3	Giovanni Lombardi (ITA)	Team Polti	s.t.
4	Mirko Rossato (ITA)	Scrigno–Blue Storm	s.t.
5	Fabio Baldato (ITA)	MG Maglificio–Technogym	s.t.
6	Tristan Hoffman (NED)	TVM–Farm Frites	s.t.
7	Michel Lafis (SWE)	Team Telekom	s.t.
8	Laurent Jalabert (FRA)	ONCE	s.t.
9	Pascal Chanteur (FRA)	Petit Casino	s.t.
10	Oscar Aranguren Armino (ESP)	Santa Clara	s.t.

General classification after Stage 1

Rank	Rider	Team	Time
1	Biagio Conte (ITA)	Scrigno–Blue Storm	3h 52' 11"
2	Tom Steels (BEL)	Mapei–GB	+ 8"
3	Igor González de Galdeano (ESP)	Equipo Euskadi	+ 10"
4	Giovanni Lombardi (ITA)	Team Polti	+ 12"
5	Mirko Rossato (ITA)	Scrigno–Blue Storm	+ 15"
6	Asier Guenetxea (ESP)	Equipo Euskadi	s.t.
7	Fabio Baldato (ITA)	MG Maglificio–Technogym	+ 16"
8	Tristan Hoffman (NED)	TVM–Farm Frites	s.t.
9	Michel Lafis (SWE)	Team Telekom	s.t.
10	Laurent Jalabert (FRA)	ONCE	s.t.

== Stage 2 ==
8 September 1996 — Valencia to Cuenca, 210 km (130 mi)

Stage 2 result

Rank	Rider	Team	Time
1	Nicola Minali (ITA)	Gewiss Playbus	4h 55' 35"
2	Laurent Jalabert (FRA)	ONCE	s.t.
3	Fabio Baldato (ITA)	MG Maglificio–Technogym	s.t.
4	Tom Steels (BEL)	Mapei–GB	s.t.
5	Giovanni Lombardi (ITA)	Team Polti	s.t.
6	Michel Lafis (SWE)	Team Telekom	s.t.
7	Kai Hundertmarck (GER)	Team Telekom	s.t.
8	Biagio Conte (ITA)	Scrigno–Blue Storm	s.t.
9	Pascal Chanteur (FRA)	Petit Casino	s.t.
10	Steffen Wesemann (GER)	Team Telekom	s.t.

General classification after Stage 2

Rank	Rider	Team	Time
1	Biagio Conte (ITA)	Scrigno–Blue Storm	8h 47' 45"
2	Nicola Minali (ITA)	Gewiss Playbus	+ 5"
3	Tom Steels (BEL)	Mapei–GB	+ 9"
4	Fabio Baldato (ITA)	MG Maglificio–Technogym	s.t.
5	Laurent Jalabert (FRA)	ONCE	s.t.
6	Giovanni Lombardi (ITA)	Team Polti	+ 13"
7	Jürgen Werner (GER)	Team Telekom	+ 16"
8	Mirko Rossato (ITA)	Scrigno–Blue Storm	s.t.
9	Michel Lafis (SWE)	Team Telekom	+ 17"
10	Pascal Chanteur (FRA)	Petit Casino	s.t.

== Stage 3 ==
9 September 1996 — Cuenca to Albacete, 167.2 km (103.9 mi)

Stage 3 result

Rank	Rider	Team	Time
1	Laurent Jalabert (FRA)	ONCE	3h 23' 40"
2	Giovanni Lombardi (ITA)	Team Polti	s.t.
3	Fabio Baldato (ITA)	MG Maglificio–Technogym	s.t.
4	Steffen Wesemann (GER)	Team Telekom	s.t.
5	Dimitri Konyshev (RUS)	Aki–Gipiemme	s.t.
6	Massimo Apollonio (ITA)	Scrigno–Blue Storm	s.t.
7	Serguei Smetanine (RUS)	Santa Clara	s.t.
8	Bert Dietz (GER)	Team Telekom	s.t.
9	Jürgen Werner (GER)	Team Telekom	s.t.
10	Davide Rebellin (ITA)	Team Polti	s.t.

General classification after Stage 3

Rank	Rider	Team	Time
1	Laurent Jalabert (FRA)	ONCE	12h 11' 20"
2	Fabio Baldato (ITA)	MG Maglificio–Technogym	+ 5"
3	Giovanni Lombardi (ITA)	Team Polti	+ 10"
4	Jürgen Werner (GER)	Team Telekom	+ 17"
5	Steffen Wesemann (GER)	Team Telekom	+ 22"
6	Dimitri Konyshev (RUS)	Aki–Gipiemme	s.t.
7	Bobby Julich (USA)	Motorola	s.t.
8	Laurent Dufaux (SUI)	Festina–Lotus	s.t.
9	Angelo Canzonieri (ITA)	Saeco–AS Juvenes San Marino	s.t.
10	Juan Rodrigo Arenas (ESP)	Festina–Lotus	s.t.

== Stage 4 ==
10 September 1996 — Albacete to Murcia, 166.5 km (103.5 mi)

Stage 4 result

Rank	Rider	Team	Time
1	Tom Steels (BEL)	Mapei–GB	3h 52' 52"
2	Marcel Wüst (GER)	MX Onda	s.t.
3	Giovanni Lombardi (ITA)	Team Polti	s.t.
4	Asier Guenetxea (ESP)	Equipo Euskadi	s.t.
5	Laurent Jalabert (FRA)	ONCE	s.t.
6	Steffen Wesemann (GER)	Team Telekom	s.t.
7	Tristan Hoffman (NED)	TVM–Farm Frites	s.t.
8	Biagio Conte (ITA)	Scrigno–Blue Storm	s.t.
9	Pascal Chanteur (FRA)	Petit Casino	s.t.
10	Ángel Edo (ESP)	Kelme–Artiach	s.t.

General classification after Stage 4

Rank	Rider	Team	Time
1	Laurent Jalabert (FRA)	ONCE	16h 04' 10"
2	Fabio Baldato (ITA)	MG Maglificio–Technogym	+ 4"
3	Giovanni Lombardi (ITA)	Team Polti	+ 8"
4	Jürgen Werner (GER)	Team Telekom	+ 19"
5	Steffen Wesemann (GER)	Team Telekom	+ 24"
6	Stefano Faustini (ITA)	Aki–Gipiemme	s.t.
7	Roberto Pistore (ITA)	MG Maglificio–Technogym	s.t.
8	Luca Pavanello (ITA)	Aki–Gipiemme	s.t.
9	Serguei Outschakov (UKR)	Team Polti	s.t.
10	Luca Colombo (ITA)	Aki–Gipiemme	+ 30"

== Stage 5 ==
11 September 1996 — Murcia to Almería, 208.4 km (129.5 mi)

Stage 5 result

Rank	Rider	Team	Time
1	Jeroen Blijlevens (NED)	TVM–Farm Frites	4h 39' 39"
2	Nicola Minali (ITA)	Gewiss Playbus	s.t.
3	Tom Steels (BEL)	Mapei–GB	s.t.
4	Giovanni Lombardi (ITA)	Team Polti	s.t.
5	Ángel Edo (ESP)	Kelme–Artiach	s.t.
6	Massimo Apollonio (ITA)	Scrigno–Blue Storm	s.t.
7	Pascal Chanteur (FRA)	Petit Casino	s.t.
8	Hendrik Redant (BEL)	TVM–Farm Frites	s.t.
9	Massimiliano Mori (ITA)	Saeco–AS Juvenes San Marino	s.t.
10	Fabio Baldato (ITA)	MG Maglificio–Technogym	s.t.

General classification after Stage 5

Rank	Rider	Team	Time
1	Laurent Jalabert (FRA)	ONCE	20h 43' 47"
2	Fabio Baldato (ITA)	MG Maglificio–Technogym	+ 3"
3	Giovanni Lombardi (ITA)	Team Polti	+ 9"
4	Jürgen Werner (GER)	Team Telekom	+ 20"
5	Steffen Wesemann (GER)	Team Telekom	+ 26"
6	Stefano Faustini (ITA)	Aki–Gipiemme	s.t.
7	Roberto Pistore (ITA)	MG Maglificio–Technogym	s.t.
8	Luca Pavanello (ITA)	Aki–Gipiemme	s.t.
9	Serguei Outschakov (UKR)	Team Polti	s.t.
10	Luca Colombo (ITA)	Aki–Gipiemme	+ 32"

== Stage 6 ==
12 September 1996 — Almería to Málaga, 196.5 km (122.1 mi)

Stage 6 result

Rank	Rider	Team	Time
1	Fabio Baldato (ITA)	MG Maglificio–Technogym	5h 40' 46"
2	Dimitri Konyshev (RUS)	Aki–Gipiemme	s.t.
3	Nicola Minali (ITA)	Gewiss Playbus	s.t.
4	Jaan Kirsipuu (EST)	Petit Casino	s.t.
5	Ángel Edo (ESP)	Kelme–Artiach	s.t.
6	Alessandro Petacchi (ITA)	Scrigno–Blue Storm	s.t.
7	Marcel Wüst (GER)	MX Onda	s.t.
8	Giovanni Lombardi (ITA)	Team Polti	s.t.
9	Jeroen Blijlevens (NED)	TVM–Farm Frites	s.t.
10	Pascal Chanteur (FRA)	Petit Casino	s.t.

General classification after Stage 6

Rank	Rider	Team	Time
1	Fabio Baldato (ITA)	MG Maglificio–Technogym	26h 24' 20"
2	Laurent Jalabert (FRA)	ONCE	+ 11"
3	Giovanni Lombardi (ITA)	Team Polti	+ 22"
4	Jürgen Werner (GER)	Team Telekom	+ 32"
5	Luca Pavanello (ITA)	Aki–Gipiemme	+ 38"
6	Stefano Faustini (ITA)	Aki–Gipiemme	+ 39"
7	Steffen Wesemann (GER)	Team Telekom	s.t.
8	Roberto Pistore (ITA)	MG Maglificio–Technogym	s.t.
9	Serguei Outschakov (UKR)	Team Polti	s.t.
10	Luca Colombo (ITA)	Aki–Gipiemme	+ 45"

== Stage 7 ==
13 September 1996 — Málaga to Marbella, 171.1 km (106.3 mi)

Stage 7 result

Rank	Rider	Team	Time
1	Fabio Baldato (ITA)	MG Maglificio–Technogym	4h 08' 54"
2	Giovanni Lombardi (ITA)	Team Polti	s.t.
3	Max Sciandri (GBR)	Motorola	s.t.
4	Laurent Jalabert (FRA)	ONCE	s.t.
5	Massimo Apollonio (ITA)	Scrigno–Blue Storm	s.t.
6	Dimitri Konyshev (RUS)	Aki–Gipiemme	s.t.
7	Stefano Faustini (ITA)	Aki–Gipiemme	s.t.
8	Andrea Vatteroni (ITA)	Scrigno–Blue Storm	s.t.
9	Roberto Pistore (ITA)	MG Maglificio–Technogym	s.t.
10	Pascal Chanteur (FRA)	Petit Casino	s.t.

General classification after Stage 7

Rank	Rider	Team	Time
1	Fabio Baldato (ITA)	MG Maglificio–Technogym	30h 33' 02"
2	Laurent Jalabert (FRA)	ONCE	+ 22"
3	Giovanni Lombardi (ITA)	Team Polti	+ 26"
4	Jürgen Werner (GER)	Team Telekom	+ 44"
5	Luca Pavanello (ITA)	Aki–Gipiemme	+ 50"
6	Stefano Faustini (ITA)	Aki–Gipiemme	+ 51"
7	Roberto Pistore (ITA)	MG Maglificio–Technogym	s.t.
8	Alex Zülle (SUI)	ONCE	+ 54"
9	Melcior Mauri (ESP)	ONCE	+ 57"
10	Massimo Apollonio (ITA)	Scrigno–Blue Storm	s.t.

== Stage 8 ==
14 September 1996 — Marbella to Jerez de la Frontera, 220.7 km (137.1 mi)

Stage 8 result

Rank	Rider	Team	Time
1	Nicola Minali (ITA)	Gewiss Playbus	5h 56' 57"
2	Giovanni Lombardi (ITA)	Team Polti	s.t.
3	Jeroen Blijlevens (NED)	TVM–Farm Frites	s.t.
4	Fabio Baldato (ITA)	MG Maglificio–Technogym	s.t.
5	Laurent Jalabert (FRA)	ONCE	s.t.
6	Asier Guenetxea (ESP)	Equipo Euskadi	s.t.
7	Tom Steels (BEL)	Mapei–GB	s.t.
8	Roberto Pistore (ITA)	MG Maglificio–Technogym	s.t.
9	Martin Hvastija (SLO)	Cantina Tollo–Co.Bo.	s.t.
10	Massimiliano Mori (ITA)	Saeco–AS Juvenes San Marino	s.t.

General classification after Stage 8

Rank	Rider	Team	Time
1	Fabio Baldato (ITA)	MG Maglificio–Technogym	36h 29' 57"
2	Giovanni Lombardi (ITA)	Team Polti	+ 20"
3	Laurent Jalabert (FRA)	ONCE	+ 21"
4	Jürgen Werner (GER)	Team Telekom	+ 45"
5	Luca Pavanello (ITA)	Aki–Gipiemme	+ 52"
6	Stefano Faustini (ITA)	Aki–Gipiemme	+ 53"
7	Roberto Pistore (ITA)	MG Maglificio–Technogym	s.t.
8	Alex Zülle (SUI)	ONCE	+ 56"
9	Massimo Apollonio (ITA)	Scrigno–Blue Storm	+ 59"
10	Melcior Mauri (ESP)	ONCE	s.t.

== Stage 9 ==
15 September 1996 — Jerez de la Frontera to Córdoba, 203.5 km (126.4 mi)

Stage 9 result

Rank	Rider	Team	Time
1	Nicola Minali (ITA)	Gewiss Playbus	5h 04' 52"
2	Marcel Wüst (GER)	MX Onda	s.t.
3	Tom Steels (BEL)	Mapei–GB	s.t.
4	Giovanni Lombardi (ITA)	Team Polti	s.t.
5	Giuseppe Citterio (ITA)	Aki–Gipiemme	s.t.
6	Serguei Smetanine (RUS)	Santa Clara	s.t.
7	Fabio Baldato (ITA)	MG Maglificio–Technogym	s.t.
8	Jeroen Blijlevens (NED)	TVM–Farm Frites	s.t.
9	Pascal Chanteur (FRA)	Petit Casino	s.t.
10	Alessandro Petacchi (ITA)	Scrigno–Blue Storm	s.t.

General classification after Stage 9

Rank	Rider	Team	Time
1	Fabio Baldato (ITA)	MG Maglificio–Technogym	41h 34' 19"
2	Giovanni Lombardi (ITA)	Team Polti	+ 20"
3	Laurent Jalabert (FRA)	ONCE	+ 21"
4	Jürgen Werner (GER)	Team Telekom	+ 39"
5	Luca Pavanello (ITA)	Aki–Gipiemme	+ 48"
6	Stefano Faustini (ITA)	Aki–Gipiemme	+ 53"
7	Roberto Pistore (ITA)	MG Maglificio–Technogym	s.t.
8	Alex Zülle (SUI)	ONCE	+ 56"
9	Massimo Apollonio (ITA)	Scrigno–Blue Storm	+ 59"
10	Melcior Mauri (ESP)	ONCE	s.t.

== Stage 10 ==
17 September 1996 — El Tiemblo to Ávila, 46.5 km (28.9 mi) (ITT)

Stage 10 result

Rank	Rider	Team	Time
1	Tony Rominger (SUI)	Mapei–GB	1h 10' 20"
2	Alex Zülle (SUI)	ONCE	+ 2"
3	Miguel Induráin (ESP)	Banesto	+ 27"
4	Melcior Mauri (ESP)	ONCE	+ 1' 50"
5	Laurent Jalabert (FRA)	ONCE	+ 1' 52"
6	Neil Stephens (AUS)	ONCE	+ 2' 02"
7	Michael Andersson (SWE)	Team Telekom	+ 3' 11"
8	Ángel Casero (ESP)	Banesto	+ 3' 14"
9	Daniele Nardello (ITA)	Mapei–GB	+ 3' 26"
10	Andrea Peron (ITA)	Motorola	+ 3' 46"

General classification after Stage 10

Rank	Rider	Team	Time
1	Alex Zülle (SUI)	ONCE	42h 46' 07"
2	Miguel Induráin (ESP)	Banesto	+ 1' 04"
3	Laurent Jalabert (FRA)	ONCE	+ 1' 15"
4	Melcior Mauri (ESP)	ONCE	+ 1' 51"
5	Neil Stephens (AUS)	ONCE	+ 2' 37"
6	Roberto Pistore (ITA)	MG Maglificio–Technogym	+ 4' 00"
7	Laurent Dufaux (SUI)	Festina–Lotus	+ 4' 24"
8	Mikel Zarrabeitia (ESP)	ONCE	+ 5' 00"
9	Stefano Faustini (ITA)	Aki–Gipiemme	+ 5' 14"
10	Íñigo Cuesta (ESP)	ONCE	+ 5' 17"

== Stage 11 ==
18 September 1996 — Ávila to Salamanca, 188 km (117 mi)

Stage 11 result

Rank	Rider	Team	Time
1	Marco Antonio Di Renzo (ITA)	Cantina Tollo–Co.Bo.	4h 53' 54"
2	Ignacio García Camacho (ESP)	Kelme–Artiach	s.t.
3	Ángel Edo (ESP)	Kelme–Artiach	+ 4' 46"
4	Massimiliano Mori (ITA)	Saeco–AS Juvenes San Marino	s.t.
5	Fabio Baldato (ITA)	MG Maglificio–Technogym	s.t.
6	Paolo Valoti (ITA)	Cantina Tollo–Co.Bo.	s.t.
7	Martin Hvastija (SLO)	Cantina Tollo–Co.Bo.	s.t.
8	Pascal Chanteur (FRA)	Petit Casino	s.t.
9	Nicola Minali (ITA)	Gewiss Playbus	s.t.
10	Giuseppe Citterio (ITA)	Aki–Gipiemme	s.t.

General classification after Stage 11

Rank	Rider	Team	Time
1	Alex Zülle (SUI)	ONCE	47h 44' 47"
2	Miguel Induráin (ESP)	Banesto	+ 1' 04"
3	Laurent Jalabert (FRA)	ONCE	+ 1' 14"
4	Melcior Mauri (ESP)	ONCE	+ 1' 51"
5	Neil Stephens (AUS)	ONCE	+ 2' 37"
6	Roberto Pistore (ITA)	MG Maglificio–Technogym	+ 4' 00"
7	Laurent Dufaux (SUI)	Festina–Lotus	+ 4' 24"
8	Mikel Zarrabeitia (ESP)	ONCE	+ 5' 00"
9	Stefano Faustini (ITA)	Aki–Gipiemme	+ 5' 14"
10	Íñigo Cuesta (ESP)	ONCE	+ 5' 17"
