= 1997 Giro d'Italia, Stage 1 to Stage 11 =

Cycling race stages

The 1997 Giro d'Italia was the 80th edition of the Giro d'Italia, one of cycling's Grand Tours. The Giro began in Venice, with a flat stage on 17 May, and Stage 11 occurred on 28 May with a stage to Lido di Camaiore. The race finished in Milan on 8 June.

== Stage 1 ==
17 May 1997 — Venice to Venice, 128 km (80 mi)

Stage 1 result

Rank	Rider	Team	Time
1	Mario Cipollini (ITA)	Saeco–Estro	2h 38' 17"
2	Nicola Minali (ITA)	Batik–Del Monte	s.t.
3	Endrio Leoni (ITA)	Aki–Safi	s.t.
4	Filippo Meloni (ITA)	Amore & Vita–ForzArcore	s.t.
5	Mirko Rossato (ITA)	Scrigno–Gaerne	s.t.
6	Marcel Wüst (GER)	Festina–Lotus	s.t.
7	Gabriele Balducci (ITA)	Refin–Mobilvetta	s.t.
8	Ángel Edo (ESP)	Kelme–Costa Blanca	s.t.
9	Gabriele Missaglia (ITA)	Mapei–GB	s.t.
10	Serguei Outschakov (UKR)	Team Polti	s.t.

General classification after Stage 1

Rank	Rider	Team	Time
1	Mario Cipollini (ITA)	Saeco–Estro	2h 38' 05"
2	Nicola Minali (ITA)	Batik–Del Monte	+ 4"
3	Endrio Leoni (ITA)	Aki–Safi	+ 8"
4	Glenn Magnusson (SWE)	Amore & Vita–ForzArcore	s.t.
5	Fabio Baldato (ITA)	MG Maglificio–Technogym	+ 10"
6	Filippo Meloni (ITA)	Amore & Vita–ForzArcore	+ 12"
7	Marcel Wüst (GER)	Festina–Lotus	s.t.
8	Mirko Rossato (ITA)	Scrigno–Gaerne	s.t.
9	Gabriele Balducci (ITA)	Refin–Mobilvetta	s.t.
10	Ángel Edo (ESP)	Kelme–Costa Blanca	s.t.

== Stage 2 ==
18 May 1997 — Mestre to Cervia, 211 km (131 mi)

Stage 2 result

Rank	Rider	Team	Time
1	Mario Cipollini (ITA)	Saeco–Estro	5h 09' 46"
2	Ján Svorada (SVK)	Mapei–GB	s.t.
3	Endrio Leoni (ITA)	Aki–Safi	s.t.
4	Maurizio Tomi (ITA)	Ros Mary–Minotti	s.t.
5	Gabriele Balducci (ITA)	Refin–Mobilvetta	s.t.
6	Massimo Apollonio (ITA)	Scrigno–Gaerne	s.t.
7	Gabriele Missaglia (ITA)	Mapei–GB	s.t.
8	Glenn Magnusson (SWE)	Amore & Vita–ForzArcore	s.t.
9	Mariano Piccoli (ITA)	Brescialat–Oyster	s.t.
10	Evgeni Berzin (RUS)	Batik–Del Monte	s.t.

General classification after Stage 2

Rank	Rider	Team	Time
1	Mario Cipollini (ITA)	Saeco–Estro	7h 47' 39"
2	Endrio Leoni (ITA)	Aki–Safi	+ 16"
3	Ján Svorada (SVK)	Mapei–GB	s.t.
4	Nicola Minali (ITA)	Batik–Del Monte	s.t.
5	Glenn Magnusson (SWE)	Amore & Vita–ForzArcore	+ 20"
6	Gabriele Balducci (ITA)	Refin–Mobilvetta	+ 24"
7	Gabriele Missaglia (ITA)	Mapei–GB	s.t.
8	Marcel Wüst (GER)	Festina–Lotus	s.t.
9	Mariano Piccoli (ITA)	Brescialat–Oyster	s.t.
10	Evgeni Berzin (RUS)	Batik–Del Monte	s.t.

== Stage 3 ==
19 May 1997 — Santarcangelo di Romagna to San Marino, 18 km (11 mi) (ITT)

Stage 3 result

Rank	Rider	Team	Time
1	Pavel Tonkov (RUS)	Mapei–GB	31' 42"
2	Evgeni Berzin (RUS)	Batik–Del Monte	+ 21"
3	Roberto Petito (ITA)	Saeco–Estro	+ 32"
4	Luc Leblanc (FRA)	Team Polti	+ 37"
5	Piotr Ugrumov (RUS)	Roslotto–ZG Mobili	+ 53"
6	Ivan Gotti (ITA)	Saeco–Estro	+ 55"
7	Gabriele Colombo (ITA)	Batik–Del Monte	+ 1' 02"
8	Andrea Noè (ITA)	Asics–CGA	+ 1' 13"
9	Giuseppe Guerini (ITA)	Team Polti	+ 1' 16"
10	Juan Carlos Domínguez (ESP)	Kelme–Costa Blanca	+ 1' 22"

General classification after Stage 3

Rank	Rider	Team	Time
1	Pavel Tonkov (RUS)	Mapei–GB	8h 20' 05"
2	Evgeni Berzin (RUS)	Batik–Del Monte	+ 1"
3	Roberto Petito (ITA)	Saeco–Estro	+ 12"
4	Luc Leblanc (FRA)	Team Polti	+ 37"
5	Gabriele Colombo (ITA)	Batik–Del Monte	+ 42"
6	Piotr Ugrumov (RUS)	Roslotto–ZG Mobili	+ 53"
7	Ivan Gotti (ITA)	Saeco–Estro	+ 55"
8	Andrea Noè (ITA)	Asics–CGA	+ 1' 13"
9	Enrico Zaina (ITA)	Asics–CGA	+ 1' 16"
10	Giuseppe Guerini (ITA)	Team Polti	s.t.

== Stage 4 ==
20 May 1997 — San Marino to Arezzo, 156 km (97 mi)

Stage 4 result

Rank	Rider	Team	Time
1	Mario Cipollini (ITA)	Saeco–Estro	3h 57' 58"
2	Endrio Leoni (ITA)	Aki–Safi	s.t.
3	Ángel Edo (ESP)	Kelme–Costa Blanca	s.t.
4	Glenn Magnusson (SWE)	Amore & Vita–ForzArcore	s.t.
5	Fabio Baldato (ITA)	MG Maglificio–Technogym	s.t.
6	Mirko Rossato (ITA)	Scrigno–Gaerne	s.t.
7	Gabriele Missaglia (ITA)	Mapei–GB	s.t.
8	Mario Traversoni (ITA)	Mercatone Uno	s.t.
9	Marcel Wüst (GER)	Festina–Lotus	s.t.
10	Mariano Piccoli (ITA)	Brescialat–Oyster	s.t.

General classification after Stage 4

Rank	Rider	Team	Time
1	Pavel Tonkov (RUS)	Mapei–GB	12h 18' 03"
2	Evgeni Berzin (RUS)	Batik–Del Monte	+ 1"
3	Roberto Petito (ITA)	Saeco–Estro	+ 12"
4	Luc Leblanc (FRA)	Team Polti	+ 37"
5	Piotr Ugrumov (RUS)	Roslotto–ZG Mobili	+ 53"
6	Ivan Gotti (ITA)	Saeco–Estro	+ 55"
7	Andrea Noè (ITA)	Asics–CGA	+ 1' 13"
8	Enrico Zaina (ITA)	Asics–CGA	+ 1' 16"
9	Giuseppe Guerini (ITA)	Team Polti	s.t.
10	Juan Carlos Domínguez (ESP)	Kelme–Costa Blanca	+ 1' 22"

== Stage 5 ==
21 May 1997 — Arezzo to Monte Terminillo, 215 km (134 mi)

Stage 5 result

Rank	Rider	Team	Time
1	Pavel Tonkov (RUS)	Mapei–GB	6h 14' 58"
2	Luc Leblanc (FRA)	Team Polti	s.t.
3	Marco Pantani (ITA)	Mercatone Uno	s.t.
4	Ivan Gotti (ITA)	Saeco–Estro	s.t.
5	Michele Coppolillo (ITA)	MG Maglificio–Technogym	+ 2"
6	Leonardo Piepoli (ITA)	Refin–Mobilvetta	s.t.
7	Andrea Noè (ITA)	Asics–CGA	+ 18"
8	Alexandr Shefer (KAZ)	Asics–CGA	+ 29"
9	Gilberto Simoni (ITA)	MG Maglificio–Technogym	+ 47"
10	Roberto Petito (ITA)	Saeco–Estro	+ 49"

General classification after Stage 5

Rank	Rider	Team	Time
1	Pavel Tonkov (RUS)	Mapei–GB	18h 32' 49"
2	Luc Leblanc (FRA)	Team Polti	+ 41"
3	Ivan Gotti (ITA)	Saeco–Estro	+ 1' 07"
4	Roberto Petito (ITA)	Saeco–Estro	+ 1' 13"
5	Marco Pantani (ITA)	Mercatone Uno	+ 1' 31"
6	Andrea Noè (ITA)	Asics–CGA	+ 1' 43"
7	Michele Coppolillo (ITA)	MG Maglificio–Technogym	+ 2' 09"
8	Paolo Savoldelli (ITA)	Roslotto–ZG Mobili	+ 2' 40"
9	Leonardo Piepoli (ITA)	Refin–Mobilvetta	+ 2' 49"
10	Alexandr Shefer (KAZ)	Asics–CGA	+ 3' 05"

== Stage 6 ==
22 May 1997 — Rieti to Lanciano, 210 km (130 mi)

Stage 6 result

Rank	Rider	Team	Time
1	Roberto Sgambelluri (ITA)	Brescialat–Oyster	6h 14' 58"
2	Dario Frigo (ITA)	Saeco–Estro	s.t.
3	Michele Coppolillo (ITA)	MG Maglificio–Technogym	s.t.
4	Tobias Steinhauser (GER)	Refin–Mobilvetta	s.t.
5	Fabio Baldato (ITA)	MG Maglificio–Technogym	+ 16"
6	Marcel Wüst (GER)	Festina–Lotus	s.t.
7	Dimitri Konyshev (RUS)	Roslotto–ZG Mobili	s.t.
8	Wladimir Belli (ITA)	Brescialat–Oyster	s.t.
9	Roberto Moretti (ITA)	Kross–Montanari–Selle Italia	s.t.
10	Massimiliano Gentili (ITA)	Cantina Tollo–Carrier–Starplast	s.t.

General classification after Stage 6

Rank	Rider	Team	Time
1	Pavel Tonkov (RUS)	Mapei–GB	23h 43' 02"
2	Luc Leblanc (FRA)	Team Polti	+ 41"
3	Ivan Gotti (ITA)	Saeco–Estro	+ 1' 07"
4	Roberto Petito (ITA)	Saeco–Estro	+ 1' 13"
5	Marco Pantani (ITA)	Mercatone Uno	+ 1' 31"
6	Andrea Noè (ITA)	Asics–CGA	+ 1' 43"
7	Michele Coppolillo (ITA)	MG Maglificio–Technogym	+ 1' 49"
8	Paolo Savoldelli (ITA)	Roslotto–ZG Mobili	+ 2' 40"
9	Leonardo Piepoli (ITA)	Refin–Mobilvetta	+ 2' 49"
10	Alexandr Shefer (KAZ)	Asics–CGA	+ 3' 05"

== Stage 7 ==
23 May 1997 — Lanciano to Mondragone, 210 km (130 mi)

Stage 7 result

Rank	Rider	Team	Time
1	Marcel Wüst (GER)	Festina–Lotus	5h 15' 40"
2	Mirko Rossato (ITA)	Scrigno–Gaerne	s.t.
3	Endrio Leoni (ITA)	Aki–Safi	s.t.
4	Glenn Magnusson (SWE)	Amore & Vita–ForzArcore	s.t.
5	Mario Traversoni (ITA)	Mercatone Uno	s.t.
6	Mario Manzoni (ITA)	Roslotto–ZG Mobili	s.t.
7	Daniele Contrini (ITA)	Brescialat–Oyster	s.t.
8	Gabriele Balducci (ITA)	Refin–Mobilvetta	s.t.
9	Jürgen Werner (GER)	Refin–Mobilvetta	s.t.
10	Fabio Baldato (ITA)	MG Maglificio–Technogym	s.t.

General classification after Stage 7

Rank	Rider	Team	Time
1	Pavel Tonkov (RUS)	Mapei–GB	28h 58' 42"
2	Luc Leblanc (FRA)	Team Polti	+ 41"
3	Ivan Gotti (ITA)	Saeco–Estro	+ 1' 07"
4	Roberto Petito (ITA)	Saeco–Estro	+ 1' 13"
5	Marco Pantani (ITA)	Mercatone Uno	+ 1' 31"
6	Andrea Noè (ITA)	Asics–CGA	+ 1' 43"
7	Michele Coppolillo (ITA)	MG Maglificio–Technogym	+ 1' 49"
8	Paolo Savoldelli (ITA)	Roslotto–ZG Mobili	+ 2' 40"
9	Leonardo Piepoli (ITA)	Refin–Mobilvetta	+ 2' 49"
10	Alexandr Shefer (KAZ)	Asics–CGA	+ 3' 05"

== Stage 8 ==
24 May 1997 — Mondragone to Cava de' Tirreni, 212 km (132 mi)

Stage 8 result

Rank	Rider	Team	Time
1	Mario Manzoni (ITA)	Roslotto–ZG Mobili	5h 20' 09"
2	Stefano Giraldi (ITA)	Kross–Montanari–Selle Italia	+ 23"
3	Maurizio Molinari (ITA)	Asics–CGA	+ 25"
4	Gianpaolo Mondini (ITA)	Amore & Vita–ForzArcore	s.t.
5	Mariano Piccoli (ITA)	Brescialat–Oyster	+ 35"
6	Denis Zanette (ITA)	Aki–Safi	s.t.
7	Nicola Loda (ITA)	MG Maglificio–Technogym	s.t.
8	Andrea Vatteroni (ITA)	Scrigno–Gaerne	s.t.
9	Andrea Paluan (ITA)	Cantina Tollo–Carrier–Starplast	s.t.
10	Andrea Brognara (ITA)	Batik–Del Monte	s.t.

General classification after Stage 8

Rank	Rider	Team	Time
1	Pavel Tonkov (RUS)	Mapei–GB	34h 32' 52"
2	Luc Leblanc (FRA)	Team Polti	+ 41"
3	Ivan Gotti (ITA)	Saeco–Estro	+ 1' 07"
4	Roberto Petito (ITA)	Saeco–Estro	+ 1' 13"
5	Andrea Paluan (ITA)	Cantina Tollo–Carrier–Starplast	+ 1' 39"
6	Andrea Noè (ITA)	Asics–CGA	+ 1' 43"
7	Michele Coppolillo (ITA)	MG Maglificio–Technogym	+ 1' 49"
8	Paolo Savoldelli (ITA)	Roslotto–ZG Mobili	+ 2' 40"
9	Leonardo Piepoli (ITA)	Refin–Mobilvetta	+ 2' 49"
10	Alexandr Shefer (KAZ)	Asics–CGA	+ 3' 05"

== Stage 9 ==
25 May 1997 — Cava de' Tirreni to Castrovillari, 232 km (144 mi)

Stage 9 result

Rank	Rider	Team	Time
1	Dimitri Konyshev (RUS)	Roslotto–ZG Mobili	6h 14' 18"
2	Mariano Piccoli (ITA)	Brescialat–Oyster	s.t.
3	Roberto Petito (ITA)	Saeco–Estro	s.t.
4	Massimiliano Gentili (ITA)	Cantina Tollo–Carrier–Starplast	s.t.
5	Marco Vergnani (ITA)	Amore & Vita–ForzArcore	s.t.
6	Paolo Savoldelli (ITA)	Roslotto–ZG Mobili	s.t.
7	Martin Hvastija (SLO)	Cantina Tollo–Carrier–Starplast	s.t.
8	Nicola Loda (ITA)	MG Maglificio–Technogym	s.t.
9	Alessio Barbagli (ITA)	Scrigno–Gaerne	s.t.
10	Paolo Lanfranchi (ITA)	Mapei–GB	s.t.

General classification after Stage 9

Rank	Rider	Team	Time
1	Pavel Tonkov (RUS)	Mapei–GB	40h 47' 10"
2	Luc Leblanc (FRA)	Team Polti	+ 41"
3	Ivan Gotti (ITA)	Saeco–Estro	+ 1' 07"
4	Roberto Petito (ITA)	Saeco–Estro	+ 1' 09"
5	Andrea Paluan (ITA)	Cantina Tollo–Carrier–Starplast	+ 1' 39"
6	Andrea Noè (ITA)	Asics–CGA	+ 1' 43"
7	Michele Coppolillo (ITA)	MG Maglificio–Technogym	+ 1' 49"
8	Paolo Savoldelli (ITA)	Roslotto–ZG Mobili	+ 2' 40"
9	Leonardo Piepoli (ITA)	Refin–Mobilvetta	+ 2' 49"
10	Alexandr Shefer (KAZ)	Asics–CGA	+ 3' 05"

== Stage 10 ==
26 May 1997 — Castrovillari to Taranto, 195 km (121 mi)

Stage 10 result

Rank	Rider	Team	Time
1	Mario Cipollini (ITA)	Saeco–Estro	5h 10' 06"
2	Endrio Leoni (ITA)	Aki–Safi	s.t.
3	Fabio Baldato (ITA)	MG Maglificio–Technogym	s.t.
4	Marcel Wüst (GER)	Festina–Lotus	s.t.
5	Mario Traversoni (ITA)	Mercatone Uno	s.t.
6	Mario Manzoni (ITA)	Roslotto–ZG Mobili	s.t.
7	Gabriele Missaglia (ITA)	Mapei–GB	s.t.
8	Enrico Cassani (ITA)	Team Polti	s.t.
9	Glenn Magnusson (SWE)	Amore & Vita–ForzArcore	s.t.
10	Ángel Edo (ESP)	Kelme–Costa Blanca	s.t.

General classification after Stage 10

Rank	Rider	Team	Time
1	Pavel Tonkov (RUS)	Mapei–GB	45h 57' 16"
2	Luc Leblanc (FRA)	Team Polti	+ 41"
3	Ivan Gotti (ITA)	Saeco–Estro	+ 1' 07"
4	Roberto Petito (ITA)	Saeco–Estro	+ 1' 09"
5	Andrea Paluan (ITA)	Cantina Tollo–Carrier–Starplast	+ 1' 39"
6	Andrea Noè (ITA)	Asics–CGA	+ 1' 43"
7	Michele Coppolillo (ITA)	MG Maglificio–Technogym	+ 1' 49"
8	Paolo Savoldelli (ITA)	Roslotto–ZG Mobili	+ 2' 40"
9	Leonardo Piepoli (ITA)	Refin–Mobilvetta	+ 2' 49"
10	Alexandr Shefer (KAZ)	Asics–CGA	+ 3' 05"

== Rest day ==
28 May 1997

== Stage 11 ==
28 May 1997 — Lido di Camaiore to Lido di Camaiore, 155 km (96 mi)

Stage 11 result

Rank	Rider	Team	Time
1	Gabriele Missaglia (ITA)	Mapei–GB	3h 36' 24"
2	Andrea Vatteroni (ITA)	Scrigno–Gaerne	s.t.
3	Mirko Celestino (ITA)	Team Polti	s.t.
4	Massimo Podenzana (ITA)	Mercatone Uno	s.t.
5	Francisco Cabello (ESP)	Kelme–Costa Blanca	+ 15"
6	Marco Fincato (ITA)	Roslotto–ZG Mobili	s.t.
7	Daniele De Paoli (ITA)	Ros Mary–Minotti	s.t.
8	Cristiano Frattini (ITA)	Brescialat–Oyster	s.t.
9	Mario Cipollini (ITA)	Saeco–Estro	+ 1' 00"
10	Alessandro Spezialetti (ITA)	Batik–Del Monte	s.t.

General classification after Stage 11

Rank	Rider	Team	Time
1	Pavel Tonkov (RUS)	Mapei–GB	49h 34' 40"
2	Luc Leblanc (FRA)	Team Polti	+ 41"
3	Ivan Gotti (ITA)	Saeco–Estro	+ 1' 07"
4	Roberto Petito (ITA)	Saeco–Estro	+ 1' 09"
5	Andrea Paluan (ITA)	Cantina Tollo–Carrier–Starplast	+ 1' 39"
6	Andrea Noè (ITA)	Asics–CGA	+ 1' 43"
7	Paolo Savoldelli (ITA)	Roslotto–ZG Mobili	+ 2' 40"
8	Leonardo Piepoli (ITA)	Refin–Mobilvetta	+ 2' 49"
9	Alexandr Shefer (KAZ)	Asics–CGA	+ 3' 05"
10	Gilberto Simoni (ITA)	MG Maglificio–Technogym	+ 3' 14"
