= 1996 Giro d'Italia, Stage 12 to Stage 22 =

Cycling race stages

The 1996 Giro d'Italia was the 79th edition of the Giro d'Italia, one of cycling's Grand Tours. The Giro began in Athens, Greece, with a flat stage on 18 May, and Stage 12 occurred on 29 May with a stage from Aulla. The race finished in Milan on 9 June.

== Stage 12 ==
30 May 1996 — Aulla to Loano, 195 km (121 mi)

Stage 12 result

Rank	Rider	Team	Time
1	Fabiano Fontanelli (ITA)	MG Maglificio–Technogym	4h 38' 44"
2	Gabriele Missaglia (ITA)	Panaria–Vinavil	s.t.
3	Fabrizio Guidi (ITA)	Scrigno–Blue Storm	s.t.
4	Denis Zanette (ITA)	Aki–Gipiemme	s.t.
5	Davide Casarotto (ITA)	Scrigno–Blue Storm	+ 2"
6	Mariano Piccoli (ITA)	Brescialat	+ 3"
7	Mario Traversoni (ITA)	Carrera Jeans–Tassoni	s.t.
8	Michelangelo Cauz (ITA)	Aki–Gipiemme	s.t.
9	Daniele Contrini (ITA)	Brescialat	s.t.
10	Glenn Magnusson (SWE)	Amore & Vita–ForzArcore	s.t.

General classification after Stage 12

Rank	Rider	Team	Time
1	Davide Rebellin (ITA)	Team Polti	52h 08' 07"
2	Pavel Tonkov (RUS)	Panaria–Vinavil	+ 4"
3	Stefano Faustini (ITA)	Aki–Gipiemme	+ 8"
4	Enrico Zaina (ITA)	Carrera Jeans–Tassoni	+ 13"
5	Francesco Casagrande (ITA)	Saeco–AS Juvenes San Marino	+ 16"
6	Leonardo Piepoli (ITA)	Refin–Mobilvetta	s.t.
7	Piotr Ugrumov (RUS)	Roslotto–ZG Mobili	+ 18"
8	Ivan Gotti (ITA)	Gewiss Playbus	+ 20"
9	Pascal Hervé (FRA)	Festina–Lotus	+ 26"
10	Evgeni Berzin (RUS)	Gewiss Playbus	s.t.

== Stage 13 ==
31 May 1996 — Loano to Prato Nevoso, 115 km (71 mi)

Stage 13 result

Rank	Rider	Team	Time
1	Pavel Tonkov (RUS)	Panaria–Vinavil	3h 13' 23"
2	Piotr Ugrumov (RUS)	Roslotto–ZG Mobili	+ 2"
3	Enrico Zaina (ITA)	Carrera Jeans–Tassoni	+ 21"
4	Davide Rebellin (ITA)	Team Polti	+ 33"
5	Hernán Buenahora (COL)	Kelme–Artiach	s.t.
6	Abraham Olano (ESP)	Mapei–GB	s.t.
7	Ivan Gotti (ITA)	Gewiss Playbus	+ 36"
8	Alexandr Shefer (KAZ)	Scrigno–Blue Storm	s.t.
9	Joona Laukka (FIN)	Festina–Lotus	s.t.
10	Jean-Cyril Robin (FRA)	Festina–Lotus	+ 41"

General classification after Stage 13

Rank	Rider	Team	Time
1	Pavel Tonkov (RUS)	Panaria–Vinavil	55h 21' 22"
2	Piotr Ugrumov (RUS)	Roslotto–ZG Mobili	+ 20"
3	Enrico Zaina (ITA)	Carrera Jeans–Tassoni	+ 30"
4	Davide Rebellin (ITA)	Team Polti	+ 41"
5	Ivan Gotti (ITA)	Gewiss Playbus	+ 1' 04"
6	Stefano Faustini (ITA)	Aki–Gipiemme	+ 1' 07"
7	Abraham Olano (ESP)	Mapei–GB	+ 1' 31"
8	Evgeni Berzin (RUS)	Gewiss Playbus	s.t.
9	Wladimir Belli (ITA)	Panaria–Vinavil	+ 1' 40"
10	Hernán Buenahora (COL)	Kelme–Artiach	+ 1' 48"

== Stage 14 ==
1 June 1996 — Sanctuary of Vicoforte to Briançon, 202 km (126 mi)

Stage 14 result

Rank	Rider	Team	Time
1	Pascal Richard (SUI)	MG Maglificio–Technogym	5h 57' 48"
2	Claudio Chiappucci (ITA)	Carrera Jeans–Tassoni	+ 43"
3	Abraham Olano (ESP)	Mapei–GB	+ 45"
4	Pascal Hervé (FRA)	Festina–Lotus	s.t.
5	Piotr Ugrumov (RUS)	Roslotto–ZG Mobili	s.t.
6	Enrico Zaina (ITA)	Carrera Jeans–Tassoni	s.t.
7	Pavel Tonkov (RUS)	Panaria–Vinavil	s.t.
8	Davide Rebellin (ITA)	Team Polti	+ 48"
9	Hernán Buenahora (COL)	Kelme–Artiach	+ 55"
10	Evgeni Berzin (RUS)	Gewiss Playbus	s.t.

General classification after Stage 14

Rank	Rider	Team	Time
1	Pavel Tonkov (RUS)	Panaria–Vinavil	61h 19' 55"
2	Piotr Ugrumov (RUS)	Roslotto–ZG Mobili	+ 20"
3	Enrico Zaina (ITA)	Carrera Jeans–Tassoni	+ 38"
4	Davide Rebellin (ITA)	Team Polti	+ 44"
5	Ivan Gotti (ITA)	Gewiss Playbus	+ 1' 14"
6	Stefano Faustini (ITA)	Aki–Gipiemme	+ 1' 17"
7	Abraham Olano (ESP)	Mapei–GB	+ 1' 27"
8	Evgeni Berzin (RUS)	Gewiss Playbus	+ 1' 41"
9	Hernán Buenahora (COL)	Kelme–Artiach	+ 1' 58"
10	Claudio Chiappucci (ITA)	Carrera Jeans–Tassoni	+ 2' 02"

== Stage 15 ==
2 June 1996 — Briançon to Aosta, 235 km (146 mi)

Stage 15 result

Rank	Rider	Team	Time
1	Gianni Bugno (ITA)	MG Maglificio–Technogym	5h 48' 06"
2	Francesco Casagrande (ITA)	Saeco–AS Juvenes San Marino	s.t.
3	Sergei Uslamin (RUS)	Refin–Mobilvetta	s.t.
4	Manuel Beltrán (ESP)	Mapei–GB	s.t.
5	Alexei Sivakov (RUS)	Roslotto–ZG Mobili	s.t.
6	Carlo Finco (ITA)	MG Maglificio–Technogym	+ 3"
7	Marco Milesi (ITA)	Brescialat	+ 2' 26"
8	Mariano Piccoli (ITA)	Brescialat	+ 2' 46"
9	Claudio Chiappucci (ITA)	Carrera Jeans–Tassoni	+ 2' 52"
10	Stefano Faustini (ITA)	Aki–Gipiemme	s.t.

General classification after Stage 15

Rank	Rider	Team	Time
1	Pavel Tonkov (RUS)	Panaria–Vinavil	67h 10' 55"
2	Piotr Ugrumov (RUS)	Roslotto–ZG Mobili	+ 20"
3	Enrico Zaina (ITA)	Carrera Jeans–Tassoni	+ 38"
4	Davide Rebellin (ITA)	Team Polti	+ 44"
5	Ivan Gotti (ITA)	Gewiss Playbus	+ 1' 14"
6	Stefano Faustini (ITA)	Aki–Gipiemme	+ 1' 15"
7	Abraham Olano (ESP)	Mapei–GB	+ 1' 27"
8	Evgeni Berzin (RUS)	Gewiss Playbus	+ 1' 41"
9	Hernán Buenahora (COL)	Kelme–Artiach	+ 1' 58"
10	Claudio Chiappucci (ITA)	Carrera Jeans–Tassoni	+ 2' 00"

== Stage 16 ==
3 June 1996 — Aosta to Lausanne, 180 km (110 mi)

Stage 16 result

Rank	Rider	Team	Time
1	Alexander Gontchenkov (UKR)	Roslotto–ZG Mobili	4h 47' 30"
2	Heinz Imboden (SUI)	Refin–Mobilvetta	+ 20"
3	Felice Puttini (ITA)	Refin–Mobilvetta	s.t.
4	Francesco Casagrande (ITA)	Saeco–AS Juvenes San Marino	+ 1' 08"
5	Denis Zanette (ITA)	Aki–Gipiemme	s.t.
6	Filippo Simeoni (ITA)	Carrera Jeans–Tassoni	+ 1' 15"
7	Marco Saligari (ITA)	MG Maglificio–Technogym	+ 1' 26"
8	Zenon Jaskuła (POL)	Brescialat	s.t.
9	Davide Casarotto (ITA)	Scrigno–Blue Storm	+ 1' 41"
10	Oscar Pelliccioli (ITA)	Carrera Jeans–Tassoni	+ 2' 00"

General classification after Stage 16

Rank	Rider	Team	Time
1	Pavel Tonkov (RUS)	Panaria–Vinavil	72h 01' 34"
2	Piotr Ugrumov (RUS)	Roslotto–ZG Mobili	+ 20"
3	Enrico Zaina (ITA)	Carrera Jeans–Tassoni	+ 38"
4	Davide Rebellin (ITA)	Team Polti	+ 44"
5	Ivan Gotti (ITA)	Gewiss Playbus	+ 1' 14"
6	Stefano Faustini (ITA)	Aki–Gipiemme	+ 1' 15"
7	Abraham Olano (ESP)	Mapei–GB	+ 1' 27"
8	Evgeni Berzin (RUS)	Gewiss Playbus	+ 1' 41"
9	Claudio Chiappucci (ITA)	Carrera Jeans–Tassoni	+ 2' 00"
10	Alexandr Shefer (KAZ)	Scrigno–Blue Storm	+ 2' 10"

== Stage 17 ==
4 June 1996 — Lausanne to Biella, 236 km (147 mi)

Stage 17 result

Rank	Rider	Team	Time
1	Nicolaj Bo Larsen (DEN)	Amore & Vita–ForzArcore	5h 46' 58"
2	Laurent Roux (FRA)	TVM–Farm Frites	s.t.
3	Sergio Barbero (ITA)	Carrera Jeans–Tassoni	+ 16' 02"
4	Marco Della Vedova (ITA)	Brescialat	s.t.
5	Amilcare Tronca (ITA)	Scrigno–Blue Storm	s.t.
6	Andrey Teteryuk (KAZ)	Aki–Gipiemme	+ 16' 24"
7	Zbigniew Spruch (POL)	Panaria–Vinavil	+ 16' 26"
8	Dirk Baldinger (GER)	Team Polti	s.t.
9	Fabrizio Guidi (ITA)	Scrigno–Blue Storm	s.t.
10	Gabriele Missaglia (ITA)	Panaria–Vinavil	s.t.

General classification after Stage 17

Rank	Rider	Team	Time
1	Pavel Tonkov (RUS)	Panaria–Vinavil	78h 04' 50"
2	Piotr Ugrumov (RUS)	Roslotto–ZG Mobili	+ 20"
3	Enrico Zaina (ITA)	Carrera Jeans–Tassoni	+ 38"
4	Davide Rebellin (ITA)	Team Polti	+ 44"
5	Ivan Gotti (ITA)	Gewiss Playbus	+ 1' 14"
6	Stefano Faustini (ITA)	Aki–Gipiemme	+ 1' 15"
7	Abraham Olano (ESP)	Mapei–GB	+ 1' 27"
8	Evgeni Berzin (RUS)	Gewiss Playbus	+ 1' 41"
9	Claudio Chiappucci (ITA)	Carrera Jeans–Tassoni	+ 2' 00"
10	Alexandr Shefer (KAZ)	Scrigno–Blue Storm	+ 2' 10"

== Stage 18 ==
5 June 1996 — Meda to Vicenza, 216 km (134 mi)

Stage 18 result

Rank	Rider	Team	Time
1	Mario Cipollini (ITA)	Saeco–AS Juvenes San Marino	6h 07' 58"
2	Giovanni Lombardi (ITA)	Team Polti	s.t.
3	Zbigniew Spruch (POL)	Panaria–Vinavil	s.t.
4	Fabrizio Guidi (ITA)	Scrigno–Blue Storm	s.t.
5	Davide Casarotto (ITA)	Scrigno–Blue Storm	s.t.
6	Denis Zanette (ITA)	Aki–Gipiemme	s.t.
7	Gabriele Missaglia (ITA)	Panaria–Vinavil	s.t.
8	Fabrizio Bontempi (ITA)	Brescialat	s.t.
9	Mario Manzoni (ITA)	Roslotto–ZG Mobili	s.t.
10	Roberto Pelliconi (ITA)	Amore & Vita–ForzArcore	s.t.

General classification after Stage 18

Rank	Rider	Team	Time
1	Pavel Tonkov (RUS)	Panaria–Vinavil	84h 12' 56"
2	Piotr Ugrumov (RUS)	Roslotto–ZG Mobili	+ 20"
3	Enrico Zaina (ITA)	Carrera Jeans–Tassoni	+ 38"
4	Davide Rebellin (ITA)	Team Polti	+ 44"
5	Ivan Gotti (ITA)	Gewiss Playbus	+ 1' 14"
6	Stefano Faustini (ITA)	Aki–Gipiemme	+ 1' 15"
7	Abraham Olano (ESP)	Mapei–GB	+ 1' 27"
8	Evgeni Berzin (RUS)	Gewiss Playbus	+ 1' 41"
9	Claudio Chiappucci (ITA)	Carrera Jeans–Tassoni	+ 2' 00"
10	Alexandr Shefer (KAZ)	Scrigno–Blue Storm	+ 2' 10"

== Stage 19 ==
6 June 1996 — Vicenza to Marostica, 62 km (39 mi) (ITT)

Stage 19 result

Rank	Rider	Team	Time
1	Evgeni Berzin (RUS)	Gewiss Playbus	1h 13' 59"
2	Abraham Olano (ESP)	Mapei–GB	+ 1"
3	Alexander Gontchenkov (UKR)	Roslotto–ZG Mobili	+ 46"
4	Pavel Tonkov (RUS)	Panaria–Vinavil	+ 1' 27"
5	Stefano Faustini (ITA)	Aki–Gipiemme	+ 2' 24"
6	Carlo Finco (ITA)	MG Maglificio–Technogym	+ 3' 02"
7	Piotr Ugrumov (RUS)	Roslotto–ZG Mobili	+ 3' 05"
8	Davide Rebellin (ITA)	Team Polti	+ 3' 20"
9	Zenon Jaskuła (POL)	Brescialat	+ 3' 24"
10	Enrico Zaina (ITA)	Carrera Jeans–Tassoni	+ 3' 47"

General classification after Stage 19

Rank	Rider	Team	Time
1	Pavel Tonkov (RUS)	Panaria–Vinavil	85h 28' 22"
2	Abraham Olano (ESP)	Mapei–GB	+ 1"
3	Evgeni Berzin (RUS)	Gewiss Playbus	+ 14"
4	Piotr Ugrumov (RUS)	Roslotto–ZG Mobili	+ 1' 58"
5	Stefano Faustini (ITA)	Aki–Gipiemme	+ 2' 12"
6	Davide Rebellin (ITA)	Team Polti	+ 2' 37"
7	Enrico Zaina (ITA)	Carrera Jeans–Tassoni	+ 2' 58"
8	Ivan Gotti (ITA)	Gewiss Playbus	+ 4' 09"
9	Alexandr Shefer (KAZ)	Scrigno–Blue Storm	+ 4' 44"
10	Claudio Chiappucci (ITA)	Carrera Jeans–Tassoni	+ 6' 19"

== Stage 20 ==
7 June 1996 — Marostica to Passo Pordoi, 220 km (140 mi)

Stage 20 result

Rank	Rider	Team	Time
1	Enrico Zaina (ITA)	Carrera Jeans–Tassoni	7h 12' 40"
2	Ivan Gotti (ITA)	Gewiss Playbus	+ 47"
3	Gianni Bugno (ITA)	MG Maglificio–Technogym	+ 1' 04"
4	Abraham Olano (ESP)	Mapei–GB	s.t.
5	Pavel Tonkov (RUS)	Panaria–Vinavil	+ 1' 05"
6	Piotr Ugrumov (RUS)	Roslotto–ZG Mobili	+ 1' 09"
7	Jean-Cyril Robin (FRA)	Festina–Lotus	+ 1' 32"
8	Davide Rebellin (ITA)	Team Polti	+ 2' 07"
9	Alexandr Shefer (KAZ)	Scrigno–Blue Storm	s.t.
10	Oscar Pelliccioli (ITA)	Carrera Jeans–Tassoni	+ 3' 28"

General classification after Stage 20

Rank	Rider	Team	Time
1	Abraham Olano (ESP)	Mapei–GB	92h 42' 07"
2	Pavel Tonkov (RUS)	Panaria–Vinavil	s.t.
3	Enrico Zaina (ITA)	Carrera Jeans–Tassoni	+ 1' 41"
4	Piotr Ugrumov (RUS)	Roslotto–ZG Mobili	+ 2' 02"
5	Davide Rebellin (ITA)	Team Polti	+ 3' 39"
6	Ivan Gotti (ITA)	Gewiss Playbus	+ 3' 43"
7	Evgeni Berzin (RUS)	Gewiss Playbus	+ 3' 45"
8	Stefano Faustini (ITA)	Aki–Gipiemme	+ 5' 02"
9	Alexandr Shefer (KAZ)	Scrigno–Blue Storm	+ 5' 46"
10	Jean-Cyril Robin (FRA)	Festina–Lotus	+ 7' 18"

== Stage 21 ==
8 June 1996 — Cavalese to Aprica, 250 km (160 mi)

Stage 21 result

Rank	Rider	Team	Time
1	Ivan Gotti (ITA)	Gewiss Playbus	7h 55' 00"
2	Pavel Tonkov (RUS)	Panaria–Vinavil	+ 3"
3	Piotr Ugrumov (RUS)	Roslotto–ZG Mobili	+ 57"
4	Enrico Zaina (ITA)	Carrera Jeans–Tassoni	s.t.
5	Abraham Olano (ESP)	Mapei–GB	+ 2' 52"
6	Giuseppe Guerini (ITA)	Team Polti	+ 5' 31"
7	Jean-Cyril Robin (FRA)	Festina–Lotus	s.t.
8	Paolo Lanfranchi (ITA)	Mapei–GB	s.t.
9	Davide Rebellin (ITA)	Team Polti	s.t.
10	Stefano Faustini (ITA)	Aki–Gipiemme	s.t.

General classification after Stage 21

Rank	Rider	Team	Time
1	Pavel Tonkov (RUS)	Panaria–Vinavil	100h 37' 02"
2	Enrico Zaina (ITA)	Carrera Jeans–Tassoni	+ 2' 43"
3	Abraham Olano (ESP)	Mapei–GB	+ 2' 57"
4	Piotr Ugrumov (RUS)	Roslotto–ZG Mobili	+ 3' 00
5	Ivan Gotti (ITA)	Gewiss Playbus	+ 3' 36"
6	Davide Rebellin (ITA)	Team Polti	+ 9' 15"
7	Stefano Faustini (ITA)	Aki–Gipiemme	+ 10' 38"
8	Alexandr Shefer (KAZ)	Scrigno–Blue Storm	+ 11' 22"
9	Jean-Cyril Robin (FRA)	Festina–Lotus	+ 13' 04"
10	Evgeni Berzin (RUS)	Gewiss Playbus	+ 14' 41"

== Stage 22 ==
9 June 1996 — Sondrio to Milan, 176 km (109 mi)

Stage 22 result

Rank	Rider	Team	Time
1	Serguei Outschakov (UKR)	Team Polti	4h 43' 04"
2	Alexei Sivakov (RUS)	Roslotto–ZG Mobili	s.t.
3	Andrey Teteryuk (KAZ)	Aki–Gipiemme	s.t.
4	Nicola Loda (ITA)	MG Maglificio–Technogym	s.t.
5	Mario Scirea (ITA)	Saeco–AS Juvenes San Marino	s.t.
6	Adriano Baffi (ITA)	Mapei–GB	+ 17"
7	Mario Manzoni (ITA)	Roslotto–ZG Mobili	s.t.
8	Mariano Piccoli (ITA)	Brescialat	s.t.
9	Davide Bramati (ITA)	Panaria–Vinavil	s.t.
10	Roberto Pelliconi (ITA)	Amore & Vita–ForzArcore	s.t.

General classification after Stage 22

Rank	Rider	Team	Time
1	Pavel Tonkov (RUS)	Panaria–Vinavil	105h 20' 23"
2	Enrico Zaina (ITA)	Carrera Jeans–Tassoni	+ 2' 43"
3	Abraham Olano (ESP)	Mapei–GB	+ 2' 57"
4	Piotr Ugrumov (RUS)	Roslotto–ZG Mobili	+ 3' 00
5	Ivan Gotti (ITA)	Gewiss Playbus	+ 3' 36"
6	Davide Rebellin (ITA)	Team Polti	+ 9' 15"
7	Stefano Faustini (ITA)	Aki–Gipiemme	+ 10' 38"
8	Alexandr Shefer (KAZ)	Scrigno–Blue Storm	+ 11' 22"
9	Jean-Cyril Robin (FRA)	Festina–Lotus	+ 13' 04"
10	Evgeni Berzin (RUS)	Gewiss Playbus	+ 14' 41"
