= 1996 Vuelta a España =

51st edition of the cycling Grand Tour

Race details
- Dates: 7–29 September
- Stages: 22
- Distance: 3,898 km (2,422 mi)
- Winning time: 97h 31' 46"

Results
Jersey awarded to the overall winner	Winner	Alex Zülle (SUI)	(ONCE)
	Second	Laurent Dufaux (SUI)	(Festina–Lotus)
	Third	Tony Rominger (SUI)	(Mapei–GB)
Jersey awarded to the points classification winner	Points	Laurent Jalabert (FRA)	(ONCE)
Jersey awarded to the mountains classification winner	Mountains	Tony Rominger (SUI)	(Mapei–GB)
Jersey awarded to the sprints classification winner	Sprints	Jürgen Werner (GER)	(Team Telekom)
	Team	Team Polti	

The 51st Edition Vuelta a España (Tour of Spain), a long-distance bicycle stage race and one of the three Grand Tours, was held from 7 September to 29 September 1996. It consisted of 22 stages covering a total of 3,898 km (2,422 mi), and was won by Alex Zülle of the ONCE cycling team. This was the only time in cycling history that riders from Switzerland swept the Podium in a Grand Tour.

Five-time Tour de France winner Miguel Indurain started his home tour for the first time since finishing second in 1991, having just recently been dislodged at the Tour by Bjarne Riis. He was initially reluctant to start, but convinced by his team to do so after a strong performance during the time trial at the Olympic Games in Atlanta. However, Indurain would eventually abandon the race, which would prove to be the last of his career, on stage 13 while lying in third place overall, having been dropped by the rest of the race favourites on the first-category climb of the Fito pass.

== Route ==
List of stages
Stage	Date	Course	Distance	Type	Winner
1	7 September	Valencia to Valencia	162 km (101 mi)		Biagio Conte (ITA)
2	8 September	Valencia to Cuenca	210 km (130 mi)		Nicola Minali (ITA)
3	9 September	Cuenca to Albacete	167.2 km (104 mi)		Laurent Jalabert (FRA)
4	10 September	Albacete to Murcia	166.5 km (103 mi)		Tom Steels (BEL)
5	11 September	Murcia to Almería	208.4 km (129 mi)		Jeroen Blijlevens (NED)
6	12 September	Almería to Málaga	196.5 km (122 mi)		Fabio Baldato (ITA)
7	13 September	Málaga to Marbella	171.1 km (106 mi)		Fabio Baldato (ITA)
8	14 September	Marbella to Jerez de la Frontera	220.7 km (137 mi)		Nicola Minali (ITA)
9	15 September	Jerez de la Frontera to Córdoba	203.5 km (126 mi)		Nicola Minali (ITA)
	16 September			Rest day	
10	17 September	El Tiemblo to Ávila	46.5 km (29 mi)	Individual time trial	Tony Rominger (SUI)
11	18 September	Ávila to Salamanca	188 km (117 mi)		Marco Antonio Di Renzo (ITA)
12	19 September	Benavente to Alto del Naranco	188 km (117 mi)		Daniele Nardello (ITA)
13	20 September	Oviedo to Lakes of Covadonga	159 km (99 mi)		Laurent Jalabert (FRA)
14	21 September	Cangas de Onís to Cabarceno Natural Park	202.6 km (126 mi)		Biagio Conte (ITA)
15	22 September	Cabárceno to Alto Cruz de la Demanda (Ezcaray)	220 km (137 mi)		Alex Zülle (SUI)
16	23 September	Logroño to Sabiñánigo	220.9 km (137 mi)		Nicola Minali (ITA)
17	24 September	Sabiñánigo to Cerler	165.7 km (103 mi)		Oliverio Rincón (COL)
18	25 September	Benasque to Zaragoza	219.5 km (136 mi)		Dimitri Konyshev (RUS)
19	26 September	Getafe to Ávila	217.1 km (135 mi)		Laurent Dufaux (SUI)
20	27 September	Ávila to Palazuelos de Eresma (Destilerías DYC)	209.5 km (130 mi)		Gianni Bugno (ITA)
21	28 September	Segovia to Palazuelos de Eresma (Destilerías DYC)	43 km (27 mi)	Individual time trial	Tony Rominger (SUI)
22	29 September	Madrid to Madrid	157.6 km (98 mi)		Tom Steels (BEL)
	Total		3,898 km (2,422 mi)		

== General classification ==
Rank	Rider	Team	Time
1	(Switzerland) Alex Zülle	ONCE	97h 31' 46s
2	(Switzerland) Laurent Dufaux	Festina	+ 6' 23s
3	(Switzerland) Tony Rominger	Mapei–GB	+ 8' 29s
4	(Italy) Roberto Pistore	MG Maglificio–Technogym	+ 10' 13s
5	(Italy) Stefano Faustini	AKI - Gipièmme	+ 11' 21s
6	(Austria) Georg Totschnig	Team Polti	+ 11' 33s
7	(Italy) Davide Rebellin	Team Polti	+ 13' 16s
8	(Italy) Andrea Peron	Motorola	+ 14' 46s
9	(United States) Bobby Julich	Motorola	+ 15' 10s
10	(Spain) Fernando Escartín	Kelme-Artiach	+ 18' 35s
11	(Spain) Marcos Serrano	Kelme-Artiach	+ 19' 19s
12	(Spain) José María Jiménez	Banesto	+ 20' 19s
13	(Italy) Mauro Gianetti	Team Polti	+ 21' 15s
14	(Spain) Daniel Clavero	MX Onda	+ 21' 49s
15	(Italy) Daniele Nardello	Mapei–GB	+ 22' 37s
16	(Russia) Vladislav Bobrik	Gewiss Playbus	+ 26' 00s
17	(Belgium) Axel Merckx	Motorola	+ 27' 34s
18	(Spain) Francisco Javier Mauleón	Mapei–GB	+ 27' 38s
19	(France) Laurent Jalabert	ONCE	+ 27' 44s
20	(Denmark) Peter Meinert Nielsen	Team Telekom	+ 29' 56s
21	(France) Pascal Chanteur	Casino	
22	(Switzerland) Fabian Jeker	Festina-Lotus	
23	(Germany) Kai Hundertmarck	Team Telekom	
24	(Spain) Ángel Casero	Banesto	
25	(Italy) Massimo Apollonio	Scrigno–Blue Storm	
