= Andrea Paluan =

Italian cyclist

Personal information
- Born: 17 February 1966 (age 60) Biella, Italy

Cycling career
- Sport: Cycling
- Role: Rider

Andrea Paluan (born 17 February 1966) is an Italian former professional racing cyclist. His finished 9th in the 11th stage of the 1997 edition of the Giro d'Italia, where he finished 42nd overall riding for Cantina Tollo.
