= Serguei Smetanine =

Russian bicycle racer

Personal information
- Born: 24 October 1973 (age 52) Yekaterinburg, Russia

Cycling career
- Sport: Cycling
- Current team: Retired
- Discipline: Road
- Role: Rider

Professional teams
- 1994: Rotator
- 1995: Spútnik
- 1996: Santa Clara
- 1997: Deportpublic–Cafés Toscaf
- 1998–1999: Vitalicio Seguros
- 2000: Benfica
- 2001–2003: Jazztel–Costa de Almería

Major wins
- 1 stage Vuelta a España (2002)

Serguei Smetanine (born 24 October 1973) is a Russian former racing cyclist.

== Major results ==
1996
1st Stage 2 Vuelta a Castilla y León
2nd Circuito de Getxo
1997
1st Overall Clásica de Alcobendas
1st Stage 2 Setmana Catalana de Ciclisme
1st Stage 4 Vuelta a Asturias
1st Stage 4 Vuelta a La Rioja
3rd Circuito de Getxo
4th Clásica de Almería
1998
1st GP Llodio
1st Stage 3 Vuelta a Aragón
1st Stage 1 Vuelta a Galicia
1st Stages 1 & 2 Vuelta a La Rioja
1999
1st Overall Gran Premio Internacional Mitsubishi MR Cortez

1st Stage 3

1st Stage 3 Vuelta a Burgos
1st Stage 1 Vuelta a La Rioja
2000
1st Stage 5 Volta a Portugal
1st Stage 5 Settimana Ciclistica Lombarda
1st Stage 2 Gran Premio Internacional Mitsubishi MR Cortez
2001
1st Stage 2 Setmana Catalana de Ciclisme
2002
1st Stage 14 Vuelta a España

=== Grand Tour general classification results timeline ===
Grand Tour	1996	1997	1998	1999	2000	2001	2002
Giro d'Italia	—	—	DNF	92	—	—	—
Tour de France	—	—	—	—	—	—	—
Vuelta a España	92	DNF	61	94	—	114	80

Legend
—	Did not compete
DNF	Did not finish
