= Asier Guenetxea =

Spanish cyclist

Personal information
- Full name: Asier Guenetxea Sasiain
- Born: 15 May 1970 (age 56) Aretxabaleta, Spain

Cycling career
- Sport: Cycling
- Current team: Retired
- Discipline: Road
- Role: Rider

Professional teams
- 1992–1994: Artiach–Royal
- 1995–1996: Equipo Euskadi

Asier Guenetxea Sasiain (born 15 May 1970) is a Spanish former road cyclist, who competed as a professional from 1992 to 1996. He competed in two editions of the Vuelta a España, and had 11 professional wins in his career.

== Major results ==
1990
1st Stages 1 & 4 Tour du Poitou-Charentes
1991
1st Clásica de Almería
1992
1st Stage 5 Vuelta a Castilla y León
1st Stages 2 & 4 Volta a Portugal
5th Trofeo Masferrer
1993
1st Clásica de Sabiñánigo
1st Stage 2 Vuelta a Castilla y León
1994
1st Trofeo Alcudia
1st Stage 3 Troféu Joaquim Agostinho
1995
1st Stages 4 & 8 Volta ao Algarve
1st Stage 1 Grande Prémio Jornal de Notícias
1996
1st Stage 6 Volta ao Alentejo
2nd Clásica de Almería
10th Philadelphia International Cycling Classic
