= Roberto Pistore =

Italian cyclist

Personal information
- Born: 20 May 1971 (age 55) Monza, Italy

Cycling career
- Sport: Cycling
- Current team: Retired
- Discipline: Road
- Role: Rider

Amateur team
- 1994: Team Polti (stagiaire)

Professional teams
- 1995: Team Polti
- 1996-1998: MG-Maglificio

Roberto Pistore (born 20 May 1971 in Monza) is a former Italian racing cyclist.

== Major results ==
1993
1st Gran Premio Capodarco
1994
1st Giro della Valle d'Aosta
1st stage 3 Regio-Tour
1995
1st Giro del Canavese
1st Regio-Tour

1st stage 2

9th Giro di Lombardia
5th Vuelta a España
1996
8th Volta a Catalunya
4th Vuelta a España
1997
1st Uniqa Classic

1st stage 1

1st stage 2 Hofbrau Cup (TTT)
