= Paolo Valoti =

Italian cyclist

Personal information
- Born: 19 April 1971 (age 55) Alzano Lombardo, Italy

Cycling career
- Sport: Cycling
- Current team: Retired
- Discipline: Road
- Role: Rider

Professional teams
- 1996–1998: Cantina Tollo
- 1999–2000: Mobilvetta Design–Northwave
- 2001: Alessio
- 2002: Index-Alexia Alluminio
- 2003–2004: Domina Vacanze
- 2005: Domina Vacanze
- 2006: LPR

Paolo Valoti (born 19 April 1971 in Alzano Lombardo) is an Italian former racing cyclist.

== Major results ==
1986
Junior National Road Champion
1991
3rd GP Capodarco
1992
3rd Gran Premio Industria e Commercio Artigianato Carnaghese
1995
1st Tour de Wallonie
1st Gran Premio della Liberazione
1st GP Capodarco

1996

1st stage 8 Volta a Portugal
1st Trofeo dello Scalatore (3)
1997
5th Giro di Lombardia
2000
1st stage 4 Ster ZLM Toer
2001
1st stage 1 Settimana Ciclistica Lombarda
1st Coppa Bernocchi
2nd Tre Valli Varesine
3rd Gran Premio Bruno Beghelli
2003
10th Clásica de San Sebastián
2004
3rd Gran Premio Nobili Rubinetterie
2005
1st Coppa Ugo Agostoni
1st Coppa Placci
