= Biagio Conte =

Italian professional cyclist

Personal information
- Full name: Biagio Conte
- Born: April 7, 1968 (age 58) Palermo

Cycling career
- Sport: Cycling
- Current team: Vega–Vitalcare–Dynatek
- Discipline: Road
- Role: Rider (retired); Directeur sportif

Professional teams
- 1996–1998: Scrigno–Blue Storm
- 1999: Liquigas
- 2000–2002: Saeco–Valli & Valli
- 2003: Formaggi Pinzolo Fiavè

Managerial teams
- 2010–2014: Liquigas–Doimo
- 2019–: Work Service–Videa–Coppi Gazzera

Biagio Conte (born 7 April 1968 in Palermo) is an Italian former professional cyclist, who competed professionally from 1996 to 2003. He currently works as a directeur sportif for UCI Continental team Vega–Vitalcare–Dynatek.

== Major results ==
1991
1st Trofeo Zsšdi
1st Stage 8 Peace Race
1993
1st Trofeo Zsšdi
1994
5th Gran Premio della Liberazione
1995
1st Giro del Belvedere
1st Trofeo Città di Castelfidardo
3rd Gran Premio Industria e Commercio Artigianato Carnaghese
1996
Vuelta a España

1st Stages 1 & 14

1st Stage 4 Trofeo dello Stretto
2nd Gran Premio della Costa Etruschi
3rd Trofeo Città di Castelfidardo
6th Giro dell'Etna
1997
1st Gran Premio della Costa Etruschi
1st Giro dell'Etna
2nd Coppa Ugo Agostoni
3rd Alassio Cup
3rd Milan–San Remo
3rd Giro del Piemonte
4th Overall Giro di Puglia
5th Trofeo Pantalica
6th Grand Prix de Wallonie
7th Paris–Tours
9th Trofeo Laigueglia
1998
2nd Grand Prix Pino Cerami
5th Rund um den Henninger Turm
9th Giro del Piemonte
1999
2nd Grand Prix Pino Cerami
4th Overall Circuit de Lorraine

1st Stage 2

2000
1st Stage 15 Giro d'Italia
3rd Trofeo Luis Puig
7th Grand Prix of Aargau Canton
2001
1st Stage 1 Tirreno–Adriatico
Regio-Tour

1st Stages 1 & 5

2nd Giro di Campania
4th Milan–San Remo
6th Trofeo Luis Puig
2003
2nd Giro dell'Etna

=== Grand Tour general classification results timeline ===
Grand Tour	1996	1997	1998	1999	2000	2001	2002	2003
Giro d'Italia	—	—	DNF	87	78	127	101	DNF
Tour de France	Did not contest during his career							
Vuelta a España	DNF	118	—	—	122	DNF	—	—

Legend
—	Did not compete
DNF	Did not finish
