= Neil Stephens =

Australian cyclist

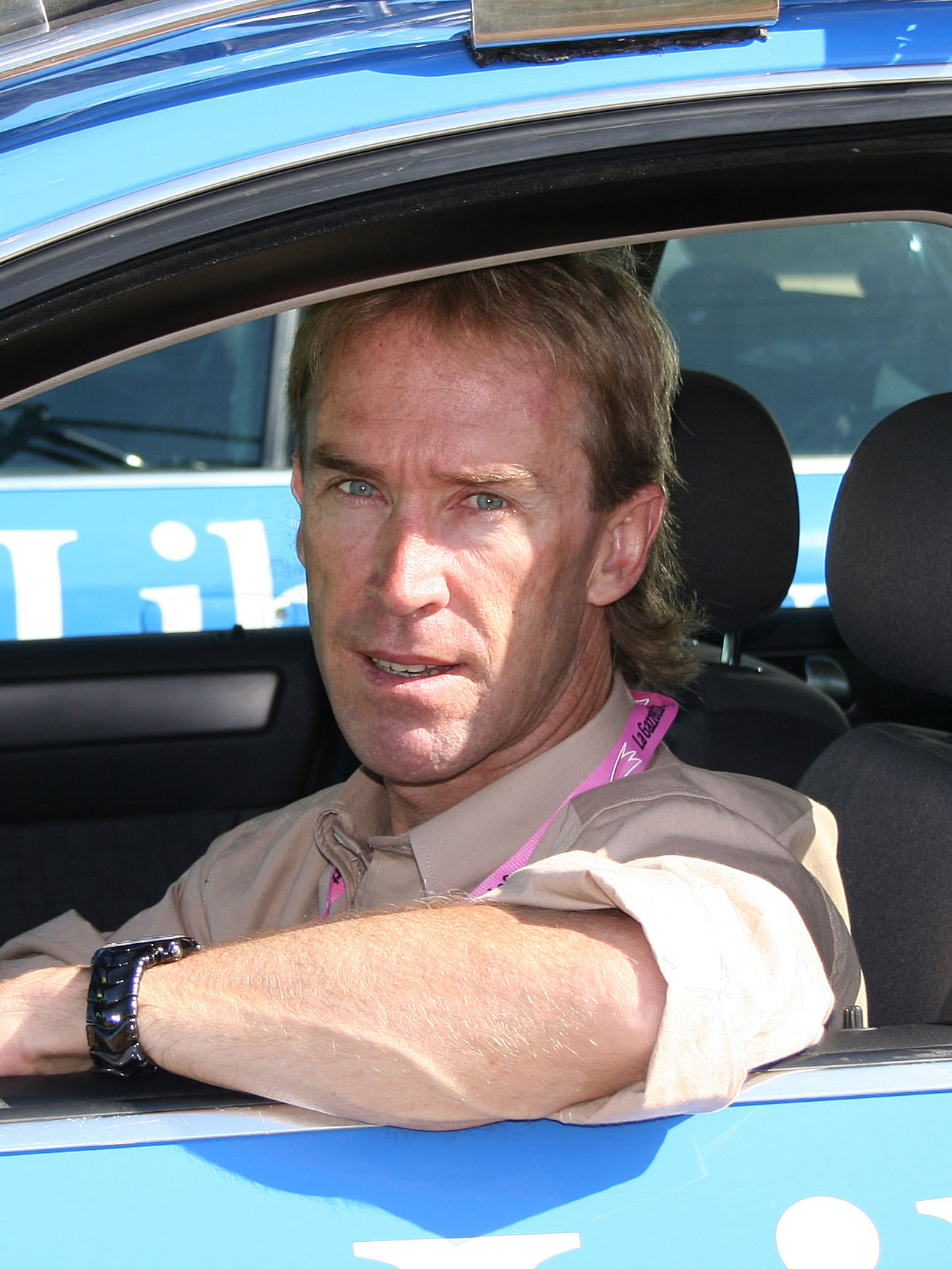
- Stephens as a directeur sportif at the 2005 Giro d'Italia

Personal information
- Full name: Neil Stephens
- Born: 1 October 1963 (age 63) Canberra, Australia
- Height: 1.71 m (5 ft 7 in)
- Weight: 65 kg (143 lb; 10 st 3 lb)

Cycling career
- Sport: Cycling
- Current team: Retired
- Discipline: Road
- Role: Rider

Professional teams
- 1985: Peugeot–Michelin
- 1986: Santini–Sierre
- 1987: Ever Ready–Ammaco
- 1988: Zero Boys
- 1989: Caja Rural–Paternina
- 1990: Artiach–Royal
- 1991: Paternina sport
- 1992–1996: ONCE
- 1997–1998: Festina–Lotus

Managerial teams
- 2000–2001: Linda McCartney Racing Team
- 2005–2006: Liberty Seguros–Würth
- 2008–2010: Caisse d'Epargne
- 2012–2018: GreenEDGE
- 2019–2020: UAE Team Emirates
- 2021–: Team Bahrain Victorious

Neil Stephens OAM ASM (born 1 October 1963 in Canberra) is an Australian former road bicycle racer. He won the Australian national road race title in 1991 and 1994. As of 2024 he is a sports director at Team Bahrain Victorious.

He is a Tour de France stage winner and is one of the relatively few riders to have completed the three Grand Tours (Giro d'Italia, Tour de France and Vuelta a España) in a calendar year, as well as being the first Australian to complete the feat. He was involved in the Festina doping scandal in 1998 Tour de France. He claimed that he took EPO but believed he was taking vitamin supplements intravenously. In late 2007, Caisse d'Epargne announced that Neil Stephens would be the team's new sport director.

Stephens was awarded the Medal of the Order of Australia (OAM) in the 1996 Australia Day Honours for his service to cycling and the Australian Sports Medal in September 2000 in recognition of his Tour de France stage win.

== Major results ==
1986
1st and Fastest Time Alex Roberts "100" Mile one day Classic Mount Gambier South Australia
1st, Overall, Herald Sun Tour
1988
1st, Stage 10, Milk Race
1990
1st, Stage 13, Herald Sun Tour
1st, Stage 5, Volta a Portugal
1991
National Road Race Championship
1st, GP Villafranca de Ordizia
1992
1st, Trofeo Calvià (Vuelta a Mallorca)
1993
1st, GP Villafranca de Ordizia
1st, Stage 3, Bicicleta Vasca
1994
1st, GP Villafranca de Ordizia
1995
National Road Race Championship
1st, GP Villafranca de Ordizia
1st, Overall, Tasmania Summer Tour

1st, Prologue & Stage 3

1996
1st, Overall, Vuelta a Andalucía
1st, Stage 5, Tour of the Basque Country
1997
1st, Stage 17, Tour de France
1998
1st, Stages 3 & 5, Tasmania Summer Tour
