= Kai Hundertmarck =

German cyclist (born 1969)

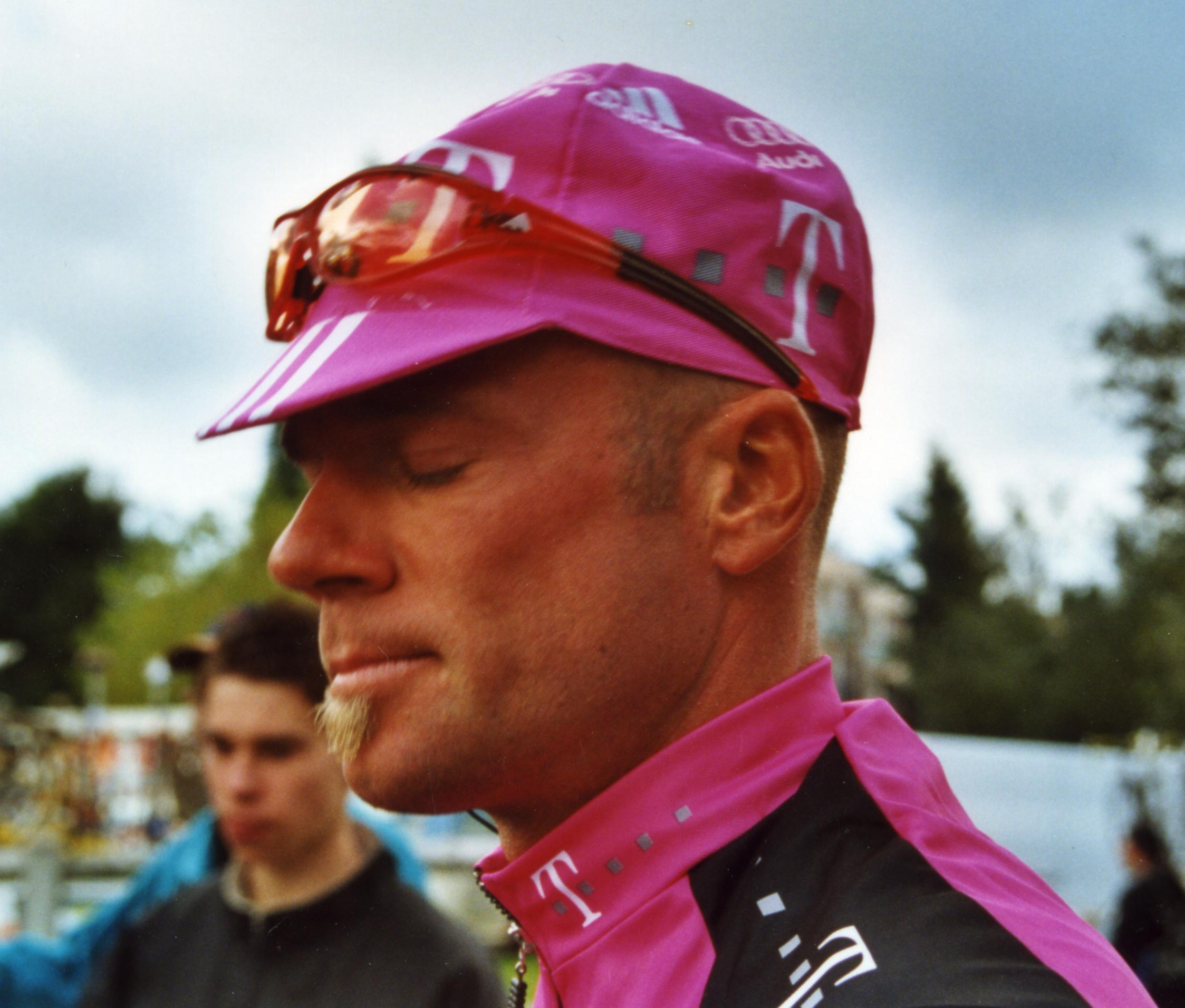
- Hundertmarck at the 2001 Paris–Nice

Personal information
- Born: 25 April 1969 (age 57) Rüsselsheim, Germany

Cycling career
- Sport: Cycling
- Current team: Retired
- Discipline: Road
- Role: Rider

Professional teams
- 1991: Histor–Sigma
- 1992: PDM–Ultima–Concorde
- 1993–1994: Motorola
- 1995–2003: Team Telekom

Kai Hundertmarck (born 25 April 1969 in Rüsselsheim) is a German former professional road racing cyclist and triathlete.

== Career achievements ==
=== Major results ===
1989
1st Overall Bayern Rundfahrt

1st Stage 2

1990
1st Overall Grand Prix François Faber

1st Stages 1 & 3

1st Overall Rheinland-Pfalz Rundfahrt

1st Stage 3

1991
2nd Road race, National Road Championships
5th Road race, UCI World Road Championships
7th GP du canton d'Argovie
1992
3rd Road race, National Road Championships
1993
8th Omloop Het Volk
10th Rund um den Henninger Turm
1994
5th Milan–San Remo
1996
7th Overall Rheinland-Pfalz Rundfahrt
7th Tour de Berne
1997
1st Stage 5 Regio-Tour
2nd Overall 3-Länder-Tour

1st Stages 2 & 5

10th Giro di Romagna
1999
2nd Road race, National Road Championships
3rd Rund um Köln
3rd Rund um den Flughafen Köln-Bonn
2000
1st Eschborn–Frankfurt
2001
2nd Overall Tour Down Under

1st Stage 5

2002
2nd Rund um Köln
2003
1st Rund um die Nürnberger Altstadt
1st Stage 3 3-Länder-Tour

=== Grand Tour general classification results timeline ===
Grand Tour	1993	1994	1995	1996	1997	1998	1999	2000	2001	2002
Giro d'Italia	48	—	74	—	—	—	—	—	98	93
Tour de France	—	—	—	—	—	—	110	—	—	—
Vuelta a España	—	—	89	23	—	81	—	61	94	—

Legend
—	Did not compete
DNF	Did not finish
