= Nicola Minali =

Italian cyclist (born 1969)

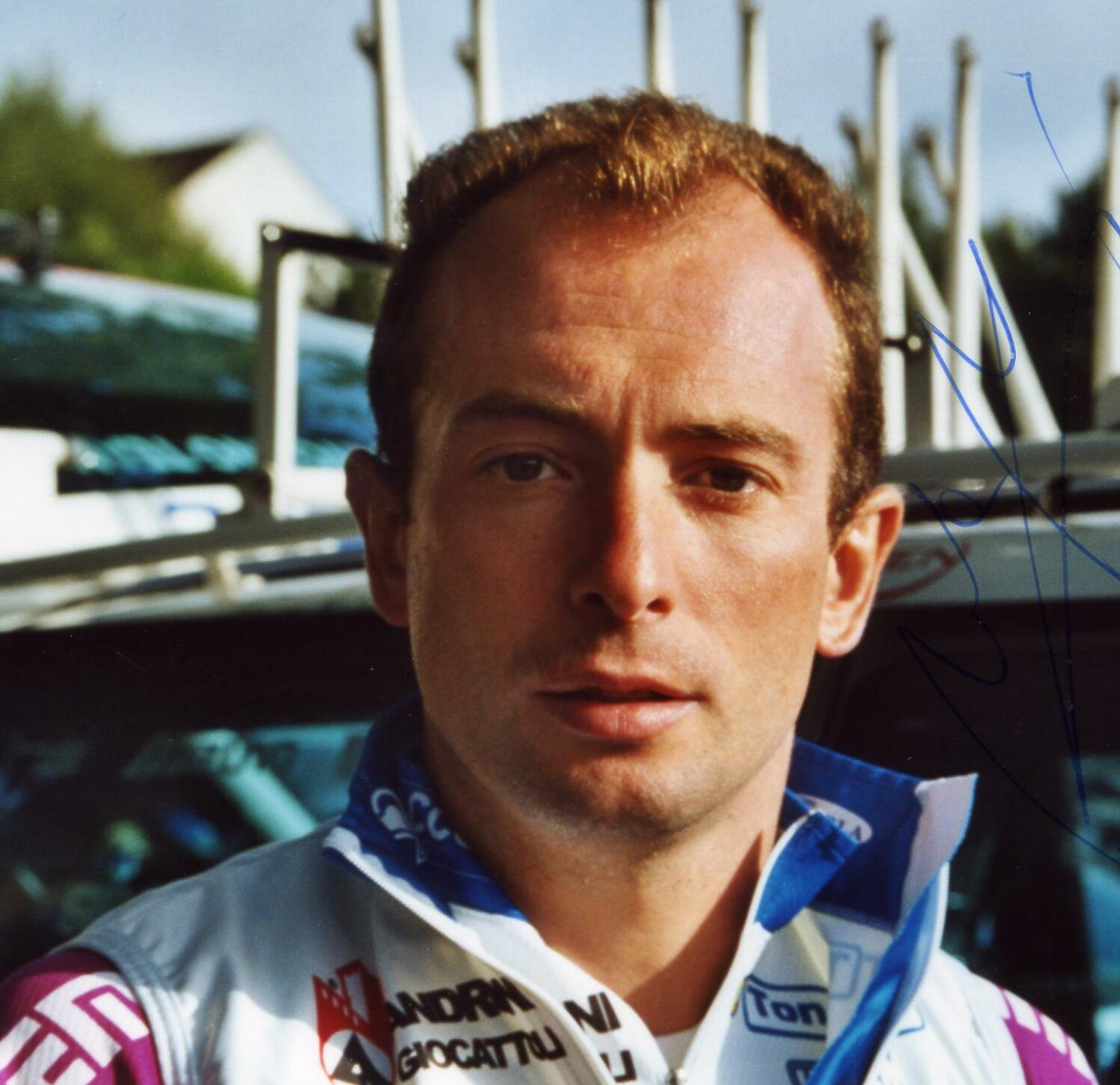

Personal information
- Full name: Nicola Minali
- Born: 10 November 1969 (age 56) Isola della Scala, Italy
- Height: 1.73 m (5 ft 8 in)
- Weight: 67 kg (148 lb; 10 st 8 lb)

Cycling career
- Sport: Cycling
- Discipline: Road
- Role: Rider
- Rider type: Sprinter

Professional teams
- 1993–1997: Mecair–Ballan
- 1998: Riso Scotti–MG Maglificio
- 1999: Cantina Tollo–Alexia Alluminio
- 2000: Alexia Alluminio
- 2001–2002: Tacconi Sport–Vini Caldirola

Major wins
- Grand Tours Tour de France 3 individual stages (1994, 1997) Giro d'Italia 2 individual stages (1995, 1998) Vuelta a España 7 individual stages (1995, 1996) One-day races and Classics Paris–Tours (1995, 1996)

Nicola Minali (born 10 November 1969 in Isola della Scala, Veneto) is an Italian former road bicycle racer. He won a total of twelve stages in Grand Tours, including the prestigious Champs-Élysées stage in 1997 Tour de France. He also won the Paris–Tours classic twice.

His name was on the list of doping tests published by the French Senate on 24 July 2013 that were collected during the 1998 Tour de France and found positive for EPO when retested in 2004.

He is the father of racing cyclist Riccardo Minali.

== Major results ==
1993
1st Stage 2 Three Days of De Panne
1994
1st Stage 5 Tour de France
Tour de Romandie

1st Stages 2 & 5

1st Stage 2 Setmana Catalana de Ciclisme
1995
1st Paris–Tours
Vuelta a España

1st Stages 1, 6 & 11

1st Stage 6 Giro d'Italia
Setmana Catalana de Ciclisme

1st Stages 2, 4 & 5

Tirreno–Adriatico

1st Stages 3 & 6

Danmark Rundt

1st Stages 1, 4 & 6

1st Stage 3 Volta a la Comunitat Valenciana
1st Stage 1 Vuelta a Aragón
1996
1st Paris–Tours
Vuelta a España

1st Stages 2, 8, 9 & 16

Vuelta a Burgos

1st Stages 1 & 5

1st Stage 5 Danmark Rundt
1997
Tour de France

1st Stages 4 & 21

Grande Prémio Jornal de Notícias

1st Stages 1 & 2

Volta ao Alentejo

1st Stages 1 & 4

1st Stage 1 Danmark Rundt
1st Stage 3 Giro di Puglia
1st Stage 1 Giro di Sardegna
1998
1st Giro dell'Etna
1st Stage 3 Giro d'Italia
1st Stage 3a Rheinland-Pfalz Rundfahrt
1st Stage 5a Setmana Catalana de Ciclisme
1st Stage 5 Tour Méditerranéen
1999
1st Stage 1 Four Days of Dunkirk
1st Stage 5 Settimana Lombarda
2001
Tour of Rhodes

1st Stages 1 & 2

1st Stage 5 Postgirot Open
