= Massimo Apollonio =

Italian cyclist

Personal information
- Born: 31 March 1970 (age 56) Casorate Primo, Italy

Cycling career
- Sport: Cycling
- Current team: Retired
- Discipline: Road
- Role: Rider

Professional teams
- 1996–1997: Scrigno–Blue Storm
- 1998–2003: Vini Caldirola

Massimo Apollonio (born 31 March 1970 in Casorate Primo) is a former Italian racing cyclist.

== Major results ==
1995
1st Stage 6 Giro della Valle d'Aosta
1st Coppa Città di San Daniele
2nd Giro del Canavese
1999
1st Coppa Agostoni
2000
1st Criterium d'Abruzzo
2001
1st Stage 4 Vuelta a Burgos

=== Grand Tour general classification results timeline ===
Grand Tour	1996	1997	1998	1999	2000	2001	2002	2003
Giro d'Italia	—	83	DNF	98	—	—	114	DNF
Tour de France	—	—	—	—	102	—	139	—
Vuelta a España	25	106	—	—	—	—	—	DNF

Legend
—	Did not compete
DNF	Did not finish
