= Pascal Chanteur =

French cyclist

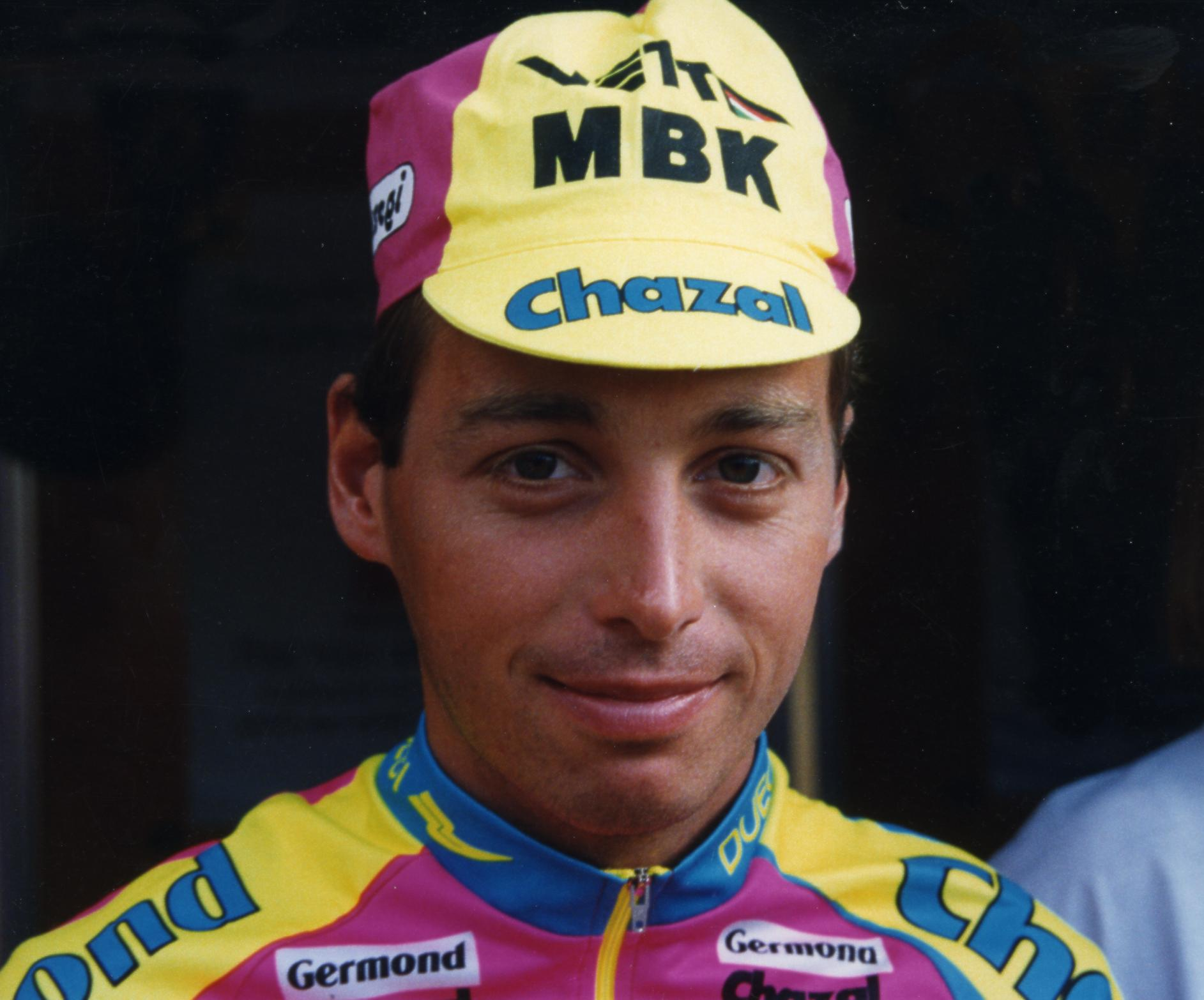

Personal information
- Full name: Pascal Chanteur
- Born: 9 February 1968 (age 58) Saint-Denis, France
- Height: 1.72 m (5 ft 7 1/2 in)
- Weight: 62 kg (137 lb; 9 st 11 lb)

Cycling career
- Sport: Cycling
- Discipline: Road
- Role: Rider

Professional teams
- 1991: Toshiba
- 1993–1995: Chazal
- 1996–1999: Casino
- 2000: AG2R Prévoyance
- 2001: Festina

Major wins
- Trofeo Laigueglia (1998); Volta a la Comunitat Valenciana (1998)

Pascal Chanteur (born 9 February 1968) is a French former road bicycle racer. Chanteur was professional between 1991 and 2001.

His name was on the list of doping tests published by the French Senate on 24 July 2013 that were collected during the 1998 Tour de France and found suspicious for EPO when retested in 2004.

== Major results ==
1990
Tour du Hainaut

General classification
1 stage

Tour de la Somme
1997
Bordeaux-Cauderan
Paris–Nice, 1 stage
1998
GP de la Ville de Rennes
Trofeo Laigueglia
Volta a la Comunitat Valenciana
1999
La Côte Picarde
2001
Vergt criterium
