= Stefano Faustini =

Italian cyclist

Personal information
- Born: 5 August 1968 (age 58) Brescia, Italy

Cycling career
- Sport: Cycling
- Current team: Retired
- Discipline: Road
- Role: Rider

Professional teams
- 1996–1997: Aki–Gipiemme
- 1998: Vini Caldirola
- 1999–2000: Mobilvetta Design–Northwave

Stefano Faustini (born 5 August 1968 in Brescia) is a former Italian cyclist.

== Major results ==
1995
1st Trofeo Gianfranco Bianchin
1st Piccolo Giro di Lombardia
2nd Overall Giro della Valle d'Aosta

1st Stages 1 & 5

1996
1st Gran Premio Palio del Recioto
1st Tour du Lac Léman
3rd Overall Settimana Ciclistica Lombarda
5th Overall Vuelta a España
7th Overall Giro d'Italia
1998
1st Wartenberg-Rundfahrt
2nd Giro di Toscana
2nd Overall Giro d'Abruzzo

=== General classification results timeline ===
Grand Tour general classification results timeline
Grand Tour	1996	1997	1998	1999
Giro d'Italia	7	DNF	22	111
Tour de France	—	—	—	—
Vuelta a España	5	—	—	—
