= Aki–Safi =

Italian cycling team (1989 to 1997)

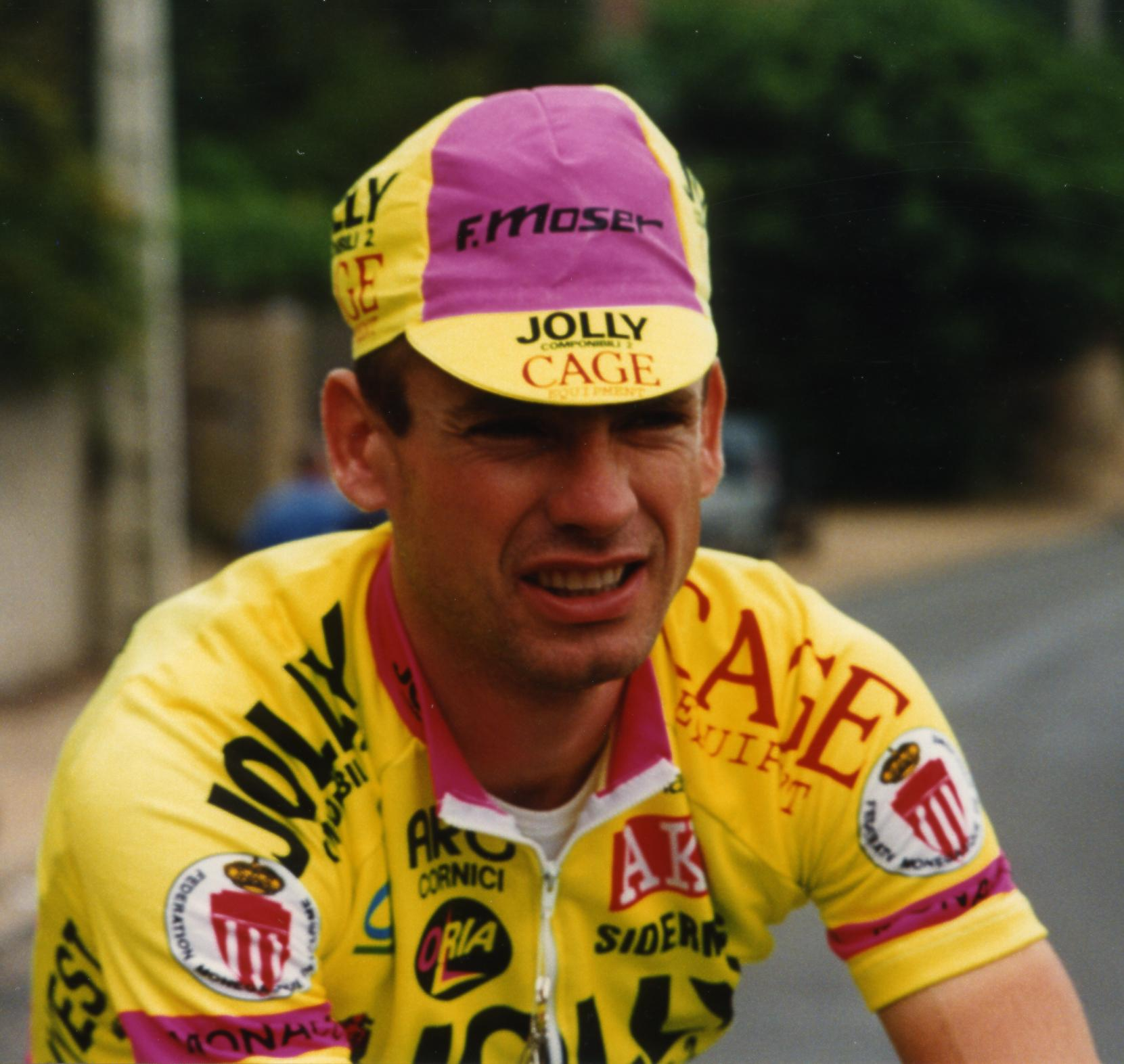
- Laurent Pillon in 1994

Team information
- UCI code: AKI
- Registered: Italy (1989–1994); Monaco (1995–1996); Italy (1997)
- Founded: 1989
- Disbanded: 1997
- Discipline: Road

Key personnel
- General manager: Roberto Amadio

Team name history
- 1989–1993 1994 1995–1996 1997: Jolly Componibili–Club 88; Jolly Componibili–Cage; Aki–Gipiemme; Aki–Safi

Aki–Safi was an Italian professional cycling team that existed from 1989 to 1997. From 1989 to 1993, its sponsors were Italian kitchen components manufacturer Jolly Componibili and Montenegrin beach resort Club 88.

== Final roster ==
As of 31 December 1997

Rider	Date of birth
Leonardo Calzavara (ITA)	8 December 1974 (aged 23)
Michelangelo Cauz (ITA)	24 August 1970 (aged 27)
Oscar Dalla Costa (ITA)	30 October 1972 (aged 25)
Stefano Faustini (ITA)	5 August 1968 (aged 29)
Gianluca Gorini (ITA)	18 October 1970 (aged 27)
Serhiy Honchar (UKR)	3 July 1970 (aged 27)
Elliott Hubbard (BMU)	19 March 1973 (aged 24)
Endrio Leoni (ITA)	22 August 1968 (aged 29)

Rider	Date of birth
Nicola Miceli (ITA)	28 May 1971 (aged 26)
Emiliano Murtas (ITA)	23 September 1973 (aged 24)
Luca Pavanello (ITA)	3 July 1969 (aged 28)
Mauro Radaelli (ITA)	10 November 1967 (aged 30)
Luca Sironi (ITA)	28 June 1964 (aged 33)
Denis Zanette (ITA)	23 March 1970 (aged 27)
Mauro Zanetti (ITA)	5 April 1973 (aged 24)
Marco Zanotti (ITA)	21 January 1974 (aged 23)
