= 1996 Tour de la Région Wallonne =

Race details
- Dates: 3–8 August 1996
- Stages: 5 + Prologue
- Winning time: 20h 15' 48"

Results
	Winner	Thomas Fleischer (GER)
	Second	Pascal Chanteur (FRA)
	Third	Maurizio Frizzo (ITA)

The 1996 Tour de la Région Wallonne was the 23rd edition of the Tour de Wallonie cycle race and was held on 3 August to 8 August 1996. The race started in Lodelinsart, Charleroi and finished in Houffalize. The race was won by Thomas Fleischer.

== General classification ==
Final general classification

Rank	Rider	Time
1	Thomas Fleischer (GER)	20h 15' 48"
2	Pascal Chanteur (FRA)	+ 8"
3	Maurizio Frizzo (ITA)	+ 1' 10"
4	Gérard Rué (FRA)	+ 5' 09"
5	Fabrice Gougot (FRA)	+ 6' 07"
6	Glenn D'Hollander (BEL)	+ 9' 38"
7	Erwin Thijs (BEL)	+ 10' 25"
8	Sébastien Demarbaix (BEL)	+ 12' 12"
9	Danny In 't Ven (BEL)	+ 13' 21"
10	Nico Mattan (BEL)	+ 13' 28"
