= 1998 Tour de la Région Wallonne =

Race details
- Dates: 1–5 August 1998
- Stages: 6
- Winning time: 21h 14' 36"

Results
	Winner	Frank Vandenbroucke (BEL)
	Second	Thierry Marichal (BEL)
	Third	Ludo Dierckxsens (BEL)

The 1998 Tour de la Région Wallonne was the 25th edition of the Tour de Wallonie cycle race and was held on 1 August to 5 August 1998. The race started in Liège and finished in Houffalize. The race was won by Frank Vandenbroucke.

== General classification ==
Final general classification

Rank	Rider	Time
1	Frank Vandenbroucke (BEL)	21h 14' 36"
2	Thierry Marichal (BEL)	+ 57"
3	Ludo Dierckxsens (BEL)	+ 59"
4	Davide Rebellin (ITA)	+ 1' 05"
5	Mikael Holst Kyneb (DEN)	+ 1' 12"
6	Alexander Vinokourov (KAZ)	+ 1' 19"
7	Marc Streel (BEL)	+ 1' 27"
8	Sébastien Demarbaix (BEL)	+ 1' 45"
9	Wilfried Cretskens (BEL)	+ 2' 18"
10	Peter Wuyts (BEL)	+ 3' 18"
