= 1997 Tour de la Région Wallonne =

Race details
- Dates: 1–6 August 1997
- Stages: 7
- Winning time: 23h 14' 54"

Results
	Winner	Thierry Marichal (BEL)
	Second	Nico Mattan (BEL)
	Third	Rik Verbrugghe (BEL)

The 1997 Tour de la Région Wallonne was the 24th edition of the Tour de Wallonie cycle race and was held on 1 August to 6 August 1997. The race started in Liège and finished in Saint-Hubert. The race was won by Thierry Marichal.

== General classification ==
Final general classification

Rank	Rider	Time
1	Thierry Marichal (BEL)	23h 14' 54"
2	Nico Mattan (BEL)	+ 3"
3	Rik Verbrugghe (BEL)	+ 37"
4	Raivis Belohvoščiks (LAT)	+ 43"
5	Glenn D'Hollander (BEL)	+ 1' 28"
6	Paul Van Hyfte (BEL)	+ 1' 37"
7	Kurt Van De Wouwer (BEL)	+ 1' 48"
8	Marc Wauters (BEL)	+ 1' 56"
9	Erwin Thijs (BEL)	+ 2' 20"
10	Mario Aerts (BEL)	+ 2' 24"
