= 2001 Tour de la Région Wallonne =

Race details
- Dates: 3–8 August 2001
- Stages: 6
- Distance: 934 km (580.4 mi)
- Winning time: 23h 12' 31"

Results
| | Winner | Glenn D'Hollander (BEL) |
| | Second | Bert Roesems (BEL) |
| | Third | David Millar (GBR) |

The 2001 Tour de la Région Wallonne was the 28th edition of the Tour de Wallonie cycle race and was held from 3 to 8 August 2001. The race started in Mouscron and finished in Aubel. The race was won by Glenn D'Hollander.

== General classification ==
Final general classification

| Rank | Rider | Time |
|---|---|---|
| 1 | Glenn D'Hollander (BEL) | 23h 12' 31" |
| 2 | Bert Roesems (BEL) | + 30" |
| 3 | David Millar (GBR) | + 35" |
| 4 | Benoît Poilvet (FRA) | + 1' 04" |
| 5 | Bert Grabsch (GER) | + 1' 06" |
| 6 | Léon van Bon (NED) | + 1' 24" |
| 7 | Niklas Axelsson (SWE) | + 1' 33" |
| 8 | Robbie McEwen (AUS) | + 1' 33" |
| 9 | Koos Moerenhout (NED) | + 1' 35" |
| 10 | Marc Streel (BEL) | + 1' 49" |
