= Frank Vandenbroucke (cyclist) =

Belgian cyclist (1974–2009)

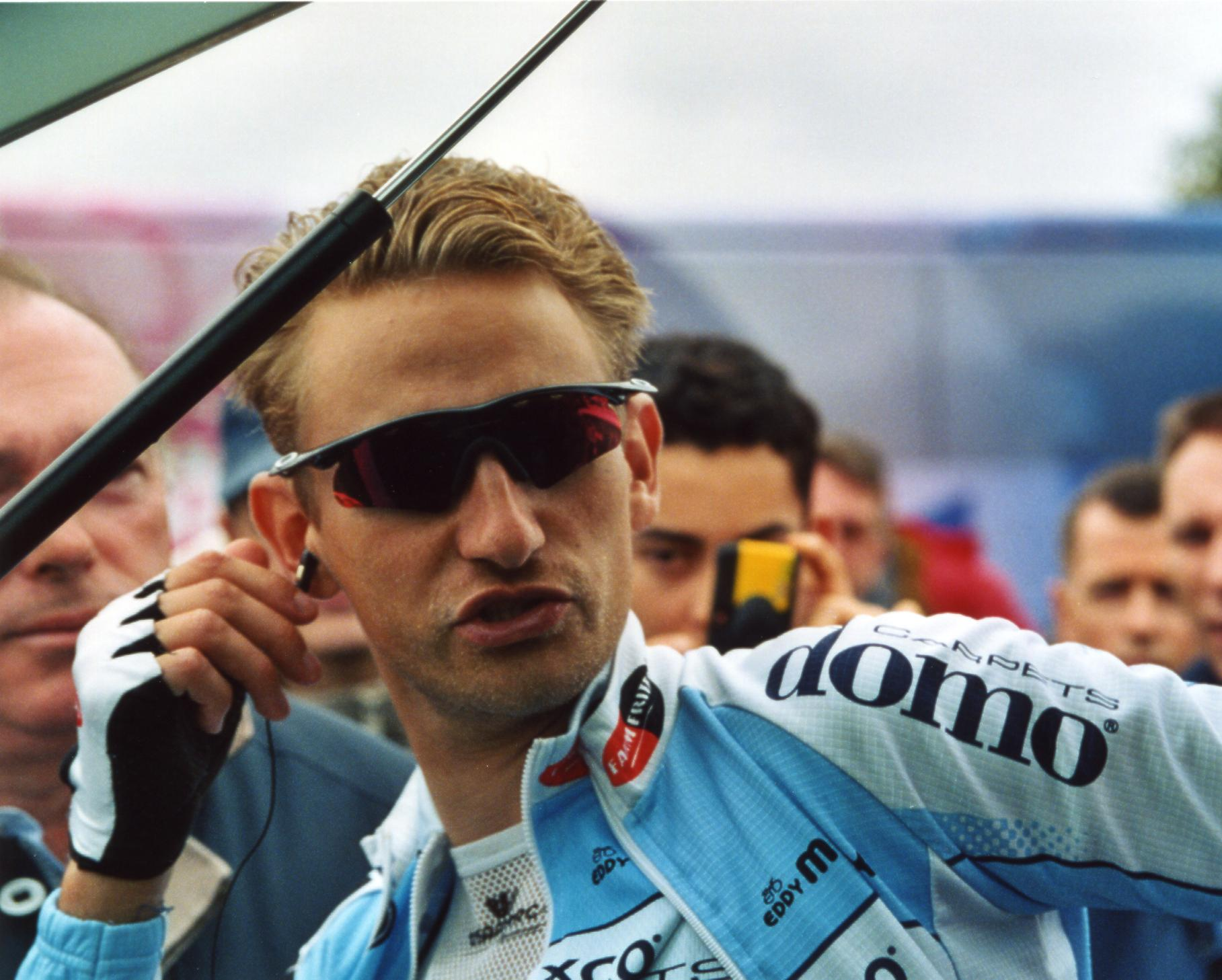
- Vandenbroucke at the 2002 Paris–Tours

Personal information
- Full name: Frank Vandenbroucke
- Nickname: VDB (Note: VDB is a common nickname in Flanders. Another Belgian nicknamed VDB was Paul Vanden Boeynants.)
- Born: 6 November 1974 Mouscron, Belgium
- Died: 12 October 2009 (aged 34) Saly, Senegal
- Height: 1.78 m (5 ft 10 in)
- Weight: 64 kg (141 lb; 10 st 1 lb)

Cycling career
- Sport: Cycling
- Discipline: Road
- Role: Rider
- Rider type: Rouleur

Professional teams
- 1994: Lotto
- 1995–1998: Mapei–GB–Latexco
- 1999–2000: Cofidis
- 2001: Lampre–Daikin
- 2002: Domo–Farm Frites
- 2003: Quick-Step–Davitamon
- 2004: Fassa Bortolo
- 2004–2006: Unibet.com
- 2006–2007: Acqua & Sapone
- 2008: Mitsubishi–Jartazi
- 2009: Cinelli–Down Under

Major wins
- Grand Tours Vuelta a España Points classification (1999) 2 individual stages (1999) Stage races Paris–Nice (1998) One-day races and Classics Liège–Bastogne–Liège (1999) Gent–Wevelgem (1998) GP Ouest-France (1996) Omloop Het Volk (1999) Scheldeprijs (1996)

Frank Vandenbroucke (6 November 1974 – 12 October 2009) was a Belgian professional road racing cyclist. After showing promise in track and field in his adolescence, Vandenbroucke took to cycle racing in the late 1980s and developed into one of the great hopes for Belgian cycling in the 1990s, with a string of victories that included Liège–Bastogne–Liège, Grand Tour stages and Omloop Het Volk. This early success dissipated however in a series of drug problems, rows with teams and suicide attempts. Despite repeated attempts to continue his career with a string of different teams from 2000 to 2008, Vandenbroucke's drug use and unpredictability eventually led to his estrangement from the cycling world. Although Vandenbroucke claimed in an interview in 2009 to have recovered his mental health, he died of a pulmonary embolism in October 2009 at the age of 34.

== Background ==
Frank Vandenbroucke was born in Mouscron and grew up in Ploegsteert, a village in the French-speaking region of Belgium (with facilities for Dutch speakers). In 1978, when he was four and cycling in the village square, he was knocked over by the driver of a rally car. His mother said her son didn't cry until doctors cut his cycling shorts. The collision led to four operations on his right knee and repeated problems later in life.

Vandenbroucke first tried athletics, joining the Entente Athlétique Hainaut. In 1986 he became a regional schoolboy champion. (Note: Vandenbroucke's elder daughter, Cameron, joined the same club and won the Hainaut cyclo-cross championship and then the Walloon cyclo-cross championship in the class for under-10s, in 2008) He took out a cycling licence with the club in 1989 and won a race at Brakel. An unnamed acquaintance told the Belgian journalist Philippe van Holle:

"It must have been when I was about 19 or 20 and went out training with a friend on the Belgian borders. As we spun along, out of nowhere this skinny blond kid was on our back wheel. He looked about 14. He was still there 15 minutes later, so we picked up speed. He just sat there, so we picked up the pace again. It was still no problem for him. I looked over my shoulder and he gave me a half-mocking, half-friendly grin. In the end, we went as hard as we could to try to get rid of him and teach the little brat a lesson, because by now he was getting a bit too cocky for our tastes. But whatever we did, he still hung on. After about an hour, we came into a village called Ploegsteert, at which point he came alongside with real arrogance and said 'OK, I'm back home now, so 'bye. By the way, I'm Frank Vandenbroucke.' Neither of us had ever met a kid like him."

In 1991, when he was 17, Vandenbroucke won the national beginners [débutant] road championship at Halanzy. He came third in the world junior road championship in Athens in 1992.

== Career ==
Vandenbroucke turned professional in 1993 with the Belgian team, Lotto. The directeur sportif was his uncle, Jean-Luc. He won 51 races in the next six years, including the 1999 Liège–Bastogne–Liège. From 2000 he made the sports pages more for doping problems, failed comebacks, depression, marital problems and a suicide attempt.

Vandenbroucke left Lotto in the middle of 1995 to join Mapei–GB–Latexco. There he became a team-mate of Johan Museeuw. The manager was Patrick Lefevere. In 1997, the team picked him as part of their squad for the Tour de France. In what would be his first of just two Tour de France entries, Vandenbroucke came close to winning a stage twice. On stage 3, he led the peloton up a steep sprint finish, but was overtaken by Erik Zabel right before the line. He was second again on stage 16, this time unable to match the sprint of Christophe Mengin. In 1998 he won Gent–Wevelgem, two stages and the overall competition of Paris–Nice, and two stages of the Tour de Wallonie. It would be his final season at Mapei–Bricobi.

In 1999 he transferred to the French team Cofidis where, at only 24, he had the best year of his career. He won Liège–Bastogne–Liège, Omloop Het Volk, and stages in Paris–Nice and the Vuelta a España. His win in Liège–Bastogne–Liège was all the more impressive because he had said in television interviews prior to the race where and when he would attack, stating he would make his first move on Cote de la Redoute, and even going as far as giving the number of the house in front of which he would launch his second attack on the climb of Saint-Nicolas.

It was, however, his last year of major victories. The British magazine Procycling said:

"Three years on a contract worth 30 million Belgian francs (£460,000) was a deal beyond VDB's wildest dreams. He never suspected that having all that money in his pocket would set off a terrible downward spiral. He won Het Volk and Liège–Bastogne–Liège before sinking into a doping controversy that was never satisfactorily explained (see below) – even though VDB was cleared by the courts. The team suspended him while the allegations were investigated and relations with their star rider never recovered. When he came back, he showed well in the '99 Vuelta before, remarkably, managing to finish in the front group of the world championship despite fracturing both hands en route. Contractually obliged to stay with Cofidis, VDB had a poor 2000 season. By this point, people in cycling were talking more about VDB's nights out than his riding."

At Cofidis he shared leadership with David Millar. His "non-communication" with Millar was publicised and criticised. It was with Cofidis, Vandenbroucke said in his autobiography, that he met the French rider, Philippe Gaumont. It was Gaumont's confessions of drug-taking in the team that led to the so-called Cofidis scandal that included a raid by drugs police on Millar's house and the British rider's suspension for two years and his disqualification from the world time-trial championship he had won. Gaumont, Vandenbroucke said in his life story, suggested he take a drug trip by mixing Stilnoct, a sleeping aid, with alcohol. Gaumont described Vandenbroucke as a wild man of cycling. It was Gaumont, Vandenbroucke said, who introduced him to Bernard Sainz, with whom his name would be connected in alleged drugs scandals (see below).

In 2001 he moved to the Italian team, Lampre–Daikin, then to the Belgian team, Domo–Farm Frites, the following year, rejoining Lefevère and Museeuw. Vandenbroucke stayed with Lefevère when he started the Quick-Step–Davitamon team in 2003 and he came second to Peter van Petegem in the Tour of Flanders. Vandenbroucke said he was happy with his performance, that he had attacked van Petegem on the last climbs because he knew van Petegem would beat him in the sprint, but Lefevère criticised him for lack of effort and Vandenbroucke left the team.

In 2004 he joined the Italian team, Fassa Bortolo, under Giancarlo Ferretti. He asked not to be paid unless he won. He had a largely empty season and was fired. Vandenbroucke joined Mr Bookmaker for 2005. He missed so many races that the team director, Hilaire Van der Schueren, demanded Vandenbroucke demonstrate that he was still a racing cyclist.

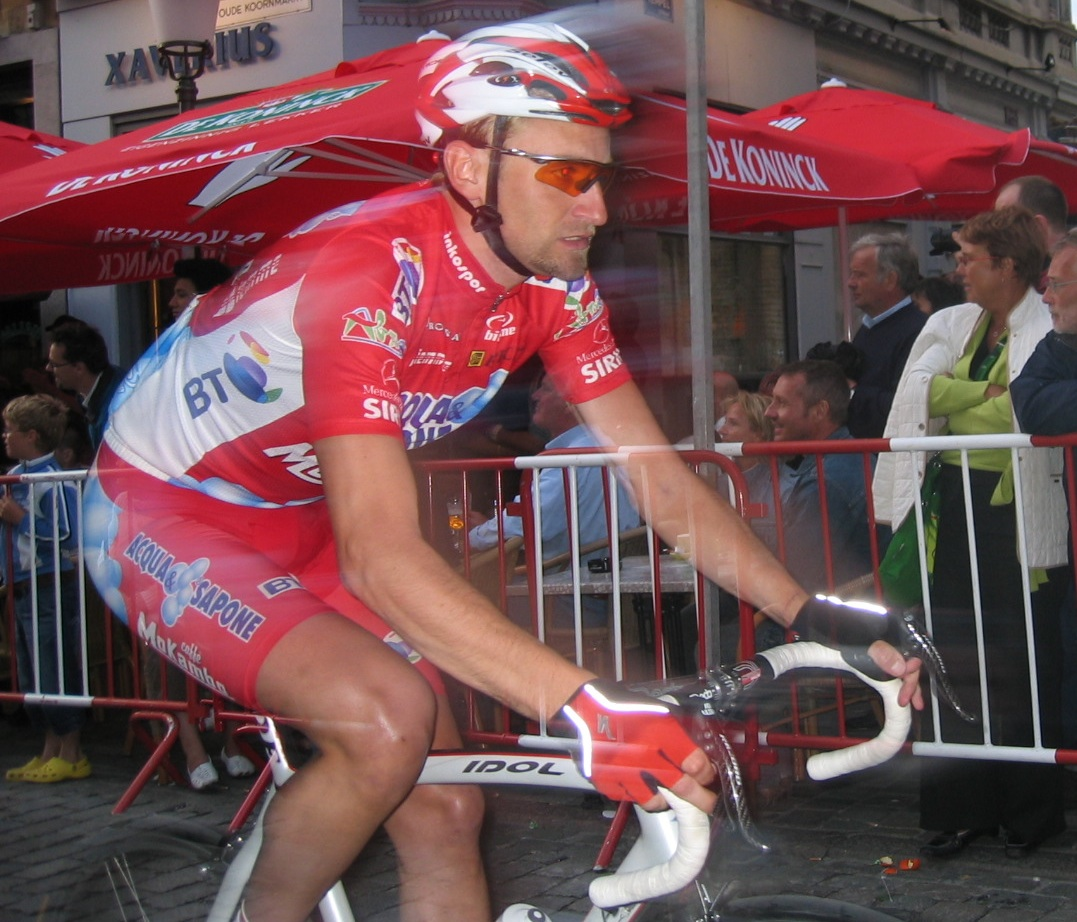
Vandenbroucke, riding for Acqua & Sapone in 2006

In two seasons at the team, he managed just one minor result, ninth on the time trial of the 2006 Three Days of de Panne. Eventually, he was sacked for not staying in touch. In 2008, he signed with Mitsubishi, where he was suspended when accused by Belgian police of buying cocaine in Wielsbeke.

On 4 April 2009 he won a stage in the French race La Boucle de l'Artois, on a 15 km time trial, his first win in a UCI-race since 1999.

Vandenbroucke said in 2004: "I've never done anything to make myself popular. In fact, the opposite. Sometimes I think it's all a dream. I've thrown up a marriage, I've been on bad terms with my parents for a long time, all of which has troubled and exhausted me." He said he had disappointed sponsors, managers and directeurs sportifs, even though they continued to show confidence in him. "I had become schizophrenic", he said. Without psychiatric help, he would "have followed the same path as Pantani", the Italian rider found dead on a hotel floor. After 450,000 French francs a month at Cofidis, he earned 220,000 at Lampre in 2001 and then half that at Fasso Bortolo.

== Family problems ==
Vandenbroucke had a daughter (Cameron) with his partner Clotilde Menu in February 1999, but the couple never were married and soon separated. The following year, Vandenbroucke wed Sarah Pinacci, a former model and hostess with the Italian team, Saeco. (Note: The two met at the world championship in Verona in 1999 and were married on 22 October 2000.) They lived at Lebbeke, near Brussels.

Vandenbroucke and Pinacci had a turbulent relationship, and it was said in the media that they could not live together and they could not live apart – forming what those close to them called "a diabolical couple". In December 2001, they had a daughter (Margaux).

In July 2006, VDB fired a gun into the air while arguing with his wife, who later left him. Vandenbroucke's father, Jean-Jacques, said his son had tried to frighten his wife that he had committed suicide. His father said:

"Frank was talking to Sarah on the telephone. They were arguing. He went out into the garden and let his shotgun off into the air. She was frightened that something had happened to him and called the emergency services. He did it to try to make her scared."

...it was the fifth or sixth time that she had returned to Italy. When they are together they fight, when they are apart they cry. He can't bear it when she leaves. He blames himself and takes all the guilt. And then there is his daughter. He can't bear not being able to see her. I probably shouldn't say so but, since Verona when he met Sarah, he has not been a committed rider."

Vandenbroucke and Pinacci eventually divorced, and the Belgian struggled to establish a more tranquil, less-public life. He resided for a time with a couple in Eeklo who had taken him in after earlier rows with his wife, before moving-on to stay with other friends. His parents, who run a bar and his supporters' club in Ploegsteert – membership dropped from 300 to 145 between 2005 and 2006 although 600 bought "Franky is for ever" T-shirts – said in 2006 that they had heard little from their son since he left Belgium for Italy. His wife had visited twice, to present her husband's new clothing collection, but not to see Vandenbroucke. In 2005, he and his estranged wife and their daughter had a weekend at Eurodisney in Paris. Supporters in the Frankyboys fan club at the café 't Parkske in Oudenaarde said Vandenbroucke had never been to see them, "although he said a couple of times that he would come but then never did." The chairman of the Frankyboys, Adelin de Meulemeester, said: "You can see him one day and he'll give you a friendly hello, then the next he won't even notice you [ziet hij je niet staan]."

In 2006 he asked his agent to ask his parents to sell his house in Nieuwkerke, near Ypres. (Note: The house was described in Procycling as having "a whole range of bedrooms, different garages for his bikes and his cars, spacious living rooms, an indoor swimming pool, and backs on to the pond dug so that he could indulge his passion for fishing.)

Vandenbroucke and his uncle, Jean-Luc, did not speak for two years after Vandenbroucke broke his contract in leaving Lotto, the team which Jean-Luc Vandenbroucke managed.

== Drug problems ==
Vandenbroucke made headlines in 1999 for the first of many drug problems, arrested by Paris police but then released. In 2001 he was stopped on the E17 motorway in Belgium in a speeding car shared with Bernard Sainz, the so-called Dr. Mabuse of cycling. Sainz was jailed in 2008 for falsely practising medicine. Sainz could not produce the insurance documents the law insisted he carry and police searched the car and found drugs later identified as clenbuterol, morphine and EPO, which is used in sport as a blood-booster. (Note: The French journalist Florent Joyard said supporters in the bar which Vandenbroucke's parents keep at Ploegsteert, were puzzled by what had been found. One was quoted as saying: "Clenbuterol leaves traces for a month, so you'd have to be really an idiot to take it. It's impossible. And what else did they find? An ampoule of Eprex (EPO), but EPO stays detectable for eight days and Frank rode the Tour Mediterranéen, the Haut Var and the Classic Haribo... As for the sachets of morphine, Frank told me himself that he had used morphine when he had his two broken wrists in plaster [after a race crash]... Anyway, with morphine, come the first kerb and you're on the ground." – Vélo, April 2002) Sainz insisted they were homeopathic products. After Sainz said he had spent the night at Vandenbroucke's house, police acquired a search warrant from a court in Termonde and searched Vandenbroucke's house with drugs specialists. There they found small quantities of more drugs which Vandenbroucke claimed were for his dog. Vandenbroucke was handcuffed and taken to a police station. Two and a half thousand fans signed a petition complaining about his treatment. Among them was his rival, Peter van Petegem. Vandenbroucke was banned by the Flemish cycling federation from riding in Belgium for six months.

The police said he was "very evasive" during questioning. The inquiries continued and in December 2004 Vandenbroucke admitted taking growth hormones, EPO, amphetamine, morphine and steroids, although he did not name his suppliers. He was found guilty in 2005 and sentenced to 200 hours of community service. He appealed and a court in Ghent fined him 250,000 euros instead. The Belgian press agency, Belga, said the court considered a fine suited to "the type of crime and Vandenbroucke's personality."

Vandenbroucke said he was naive but not dishonest in using Sainz – who was not charged – but that he was impressed at his results. He said at a news conference in Ploegsteert that he had always thought Sainz gave him homeopathic products but that he had doubts. He said Sainz had given him drops and injections. He said:

He (Sainz) said to me that they were completely legal homeopathic products. I wanted to trust him ... I was under the charm of Dr Mabuse. I may be considered naive but I am not a dishonest person. I want to believe that Mr Sainz only gave homeopathic care. I trusted him. Bernard Sainz proposed that he advise me. He seemed to be a strange man but was clearly a cycling expert. He impressed me greatly by showing me photographs of him administering his treatments to greats like Eddy Merckx, Lucien Van Impe, Bernard Hinault, Laurent Fignon, Cyril Guimard and many other great sportsmen like Alain Prost. (Note: Alain Prost said he had merely posed with Sainz in the way he posed with anyone who wanted a photograph taken in his company.) He explained to me that this care was based on natural methods and alternative medicines without endangering my health nor violating the ethics of our sport.

He paid Sainz 7,000 French francs for the homeopathic drops and 50,000 in fees in the first half of 1999. Sainz said:

I have concerned myself with him since autumn 1998. Not, as has been claimed, to get him doping products. Everybody knows perfectly, starting with the policemen who have listened to me for a long time, that riders don't need me for that sort of thing. To the contrary. If they turn to me, it's because they've heard of what I have been able to do [mes compétences diverses] for the great stars I have cited.

Vandenbroucke was twice stopped by police in 2002 for driving his Porsche after drinking.

In February 2007, publicity for Vandenbroucke's autobiography, Je ne suis pas Dieu [I'm Not God] said he admitted taking performance-enhancing drugs.

"Everybody did it [used dope], and so did I", he was quoted. "It is the truth and it does not diminish the value of my victories."

The publisher later denied Vandenbroucke had said it, claiming a misunderstanding. Vandenbroucke did, however, write that he lived a life of drug-taking and sometimes didn't sleep for days. He said:

To Stilnoct and amphetamines, I added Valium... Sometimes I didn't sleep a second in five days. I started seeing things, people who didn't exist. Like people hiding around me in the bushes with telephoto lenses. I used to hear them coming, with their combat-shoes; they got out of their bus parked in front of the house. They were coming to arrest me. Shit, my dope! I ran to the bathroom to throw my stock of amphetamines down the toilet and the syringes into the waste bin...
Sarah didn't used to see them and tried to get me to understand. But how couldn't she see them, those policemen, dozens of them, and their flashing lights! She must be crazy. But was she making it up: could she see them really?"

In March, the Union Cycliste Internationale declared Vandenbroucke persona non grata. His ex-wife described him as a cocaine addict. Vandenbroucke was suspended by Mitsubishi–Jartazi and then left.

== Impersonation ==
In August 2006, Vandenbroucke was caught in an Italian amateur race at Inverno, run by an organisation not associated with the Italian federation or Olympic committee, using a licence made out to "Francesco del Ponte" (Note: Del Ponte is a rough translation of Vandenbroucke in Italian. "Van den" means "of the" or "from the" in pre-reform spelling; there is no Dutch word "broucke" but the pronunciation sounds like the word for "bridge" or "bridges". It also sounds like the word for "trousers", leading to comments that his name could also have been translated as del Pantalone. That was the version that Vandenbroucke told reporters from Gazzetta dello Sport would have been "the more appropriate" translation. "Broucke means 'trousers' in Dutch", he said. Etymology: broucke refers to brouc, the medieval Dutch word for wetlands, marsh. An example is Brussels, originally Broeksele (10th century), meaning the settlement in or near the marsh. "Broek - (drassig land)" [Broek (boggy land)] (in Dutch).) and bearing a photo of the world champion, Tom Boonen. He described himself as Swiss and living in Rome, giving the address of a beauty salon.

Vandenbroucke said riding had been "a weakness". He said: "I dropped out of the race. I have never crossed the line in amateur races and I have never wanted to falsify their races." He rode because he "needed races", he said, at a time when he felt strong. He denied sticking Boonen's picture on his licence, saying he would have chosen someone else's picture.

== Suicide attempt ==
Vandenbroucke had a reputation for "accidents, illnesses, doping allegations, lawsuits, suspicion, surliness and suspensions". He said:

From August 2004 to August 2005, 12 months that seemed like 100, I was depressed like never before. I decided to be finished with it... That day, I was going to die... I went to fetch the most expensive bottle of wine from my cellar, a magnum Château Petrus 1961. I poured it out and I drank a toast to my life. I'd asked the advice of a doctor. Insulin would do it.
I wrote a farewell letter: it knew it was clumsy but for me it was the best solution...
"There's no need for an autopsy. I injected 10cc of Actrapid. Please, don't let them open my eyes."
... I was alone. I put on my world champion's jersey, I injected myself and then I went to lie on my bed and I waited to die. I was so happy. No more worries at last... Deliverance at last. It was my mother who found me later that day."

On 6 June 2007 he was admitted to hospital at Magenta, near Milan, Italy, where he lived. He was reported in grave condition. His team-manager, Palmiro Masciarelli, said: "Frank is all alone". He no longer has his wife and he lives by himself. There is no longer a team at his side."

Vandenbroucke had turned down the Giro d'Italia, claiming problems with his knee, on which he had an operation the previous winter. His psychiatrist, Jef Brouwers, said

"... the problems with his knee have affected him badly. He could no longer ride as he wanted after the operation. Nor could the doctors say what the problem was. These last few days, he has been terrible. The people that I called in Italy could no longer help him. He had thought it through and, so far as he was concerned, everything was lost. The situation of his knee has worn him down completely and his private life wasn't good either, with ups and downs."

== Death ==
Vandenbroucke died on 12 October 2009, while on holiday at Saly, a coastal resort 70 km south of Dakar, the capital of Senegal. He planned to stay there 12 days with a former teammate, Fabio Polazzi. An autopsy in Senegal showed he had died of a pulmonary embolism. The circumstances remain unclear due to conflicting reports, some saying a combination of drugs was found by his bedside.

An employee at La Maison Bleue, his hotel, was quoted by Agence France-Presse: "When he came in [at 2 AM], he was drunk. He was with a Senegalese woman and he planned to stay one night. At 4 AM his companion came to ask for a mop because he had been sick. By 1 PM he had not left his room. Around 8 PM my boss called me and told me he was dead."

Three people who allegedly stole his personal possessions on the night of his death were arrested, including a woman who had spent the evening with him. On 18 November 2009 his family said it did not want further tests to determine if he was under the influence of drugs.

== Major results ==
1992
1st Road race, National Junior Road Championships
3rd Road race, UCI Junior Road World Championships
1993
1st Seraing-Aachen-Seraing
1994
2nd Druivenkoers Overijse
2nd Prueba Villafranca de Ordizia
3rd Tour de Berne
3rd Clásica de Sabiñánigo
4th Trofeo Laigueglia
4th Cholet-Pays de la Loire
5th Grand Prix de Rennes
6th Overall Tour Méditerranéen

1st Stage 6

7th Veenendaal–Veenendaal
8th Grand Prix de Wallonie
9th Overall Route du Sud
9th Overall Four Days of Dunkirk
1995
1st Paris–Brussels
1st Cholet-Pays de Loire
1st Stage 1 Tour de Luxembourg
2nd Grand Prix de Fourmies
3rd Prueba Villafranca de Ordizia
7th Overall Critérium International
8th Clásica de San Sebastián
1996
1st Overall Tour of Austria

1st Prologue, Stages 3, 6 & 8

1st Overall Tour Méditerranéen

1st Stage 5

1st GP Ouest–France
1st Scheldeprijs
1st Binche-Tournai-Binche
1st Trofeo Laigueglia
Tour de Wallonie

1st Prologue, Stages 2 (ITT) & 5

2nd Grand Prix de Fourmies
4th Overall Paris–Nice
4th Overall Critérium International
5th Coppa Ugo Agostoni
7th Züri-Metzgete
1997
1st Overall Tour de Luxembourg

1st Stage 4 (ITT)

1st Rund um Köln
1st Trofeo Matteotti
2nd Overall Tour of Austria

1st Stages 2, 4 & 8

2nd Overall Four Days of Dunkirk
1998
1st Overall Paris–Nice

1st Stages 1 (ITT) & 5

1st Overall Tour de la Region Wallone

1st Stages 3 (ITT) & 6

1st Overall Tour of Galicia

1st Stage 4

1st Gent–Wevelgem
1st Prueba Villafranca de Ordizia
2nd La Flèche Wallonne
2nd Züri-Metzgete
2nd Kuurne–Brussels–Kuurne
2nd Grand Prix Eddy Merckx (with Nico Mattan)
3rd Boucles de l'Aulne
4th Overall Vuelta a Andalucía
6th Liège–Bastogne–Liège
1999
1st Liège–Bastogne–Liège
1st Omloop Het Volk
1st Grand Prix d'Ouverture La Marseillaise
Vuelta a España

1st Points classification
1st Stages 16 & 19

1st Stage 4 Vuelta a Andalucía
2nd Overall Three Days of De Panne

1st Stage 3b (ITT)

2nd Tour of Flanders
3rd E3 Prijs Vlaanderen
4th Overall Paris–Nice

1st Stage 7

5th Dwars door Vlaanderen
7th Road race, UCI Road World Championships
7th Paris–Roubaix
9th GP Ouest–France
2000
2nd Road race, National Road Championships
6th Overall Étoile de Bessèges

1st Stage 3b (TTT)

7th Overall Vuelta a Andalucía
2002
4th Overall Tour de Pologne
2003
2nd Tour of Flanders
4th Omloop Het Volk
8th Overall Tour of Belgium
9th Dwars door Vlaanderen
2004
1st Grote Prijs Marcel Kint
6th Overall Paris–Nice
6th Overall Tour of Qatar
7th La Flèche Wallonne
8th Overall Setmana Catalana de Ciclisme
2005
1st Grote Prijs Marcel Kint
3rd Time trial, National Road Championships
2009
3rd Overall Boucle de l'Artois

1st Stage 2 (ITT)

=== Grand Tour general classification results timeline ===
Grand Tour	1997	1998	1999	2000	2001	2002	2003
Giro d'Italia	—	—	—	—	—	—	—
Tour de France	50	—	—	DNF	—	—	—
/ Vuelta a España	—	DNF	12	—	—	—	DNF

Legend
—	Did not compete
DNF	Did not finish

== See also ==
- List of doping cases in cycling
