= 2005 Tour de la Région Wallonne =

Race details
- Dates: 25 July–29 July 2005
- Stages: 5
- Winning time: 21h 07' 25"

Results
	Winner	Luca Celli (ITA)
	Second	Olivier Kaisen (BEL)
	Third	Guido Trentin (ITA)

The 2005 Tour de la Région Wallonne was the 32nd edition of the Tour de Wallonie cycle race and was held from 25 July to 29 July 2005. The race started in Brussels and finished in Namur. The race was won by Luca Celli.

== General classification ==
Final general classification

Rank	Rider	Time
1	Luca Celli (ITA)	21h 07' 25"
2	Olivier Kaisen (BEL)	+ 1' 36"
3	Guido Trentin (ITA)	+ 2' 44"
4	Sergei Yakovlev (KAZ)	+ 2' 49"
5	Wim Van Huffel (BEL)	+ 3' 04"
6	Daniel Schnider (SUI)	+ 3' 06"
7	Philip Deignan (IRL)	+ 3' 13"
8	Maxime Monfort (BEL)	+ 3' 22"
9	Nico Sijmens (BEL)	+ 3' 26"
10	Frederik Willems (BEL)	s.t.
