= 1996 Scheldeprijs =

Race details
- Dates: 24 April 1996
- Stages: 1
- Distance: 202 km (125.5 mi)
- Winning time: 4h 30' 49"

Results
	Winner	Frank Vandenbroucke (BEL)	(Mapei–GB)
	Second	Tom Steels (BEL)	(Mapei–GB)
	Third	Eric Vanderaerden (BEL)	(Palmans–Boghemans)

The 1996 Scheldeprijs was the 83rd edition of the Scheldeprijs cycle race and was held on 24 April 1996. The race was won by Frank Vandenbroucke of the Mapei team.

== General classification ==
Final general classification

Rank	Rider	Team	Time
1	Frank Vandenbroucke (BEL)	Mapei–GB	4h 30' 49"
2	Tom Steels (BEL)	Mapei–GB	+ 2"
3	Eric Vanderaerden (BEL)	San Marco Group	+ 2"
4	Ján Svorada (CZE)	Panaria–Vinavil	+ 2"
5	Erik Zabel (GER)	Team Telekom	+ 2"
6	Giovanni Lombardi (ITA)	Team Polti	+ 2"
7	Mauro Bettin (ITA)	Refin–Mobilvetta	+ 2"
8	Johan Verstrepen (BEL)	Vlaanderen 2002–Eddy Merckx	+ 2"
9	Wilfried Peeters (BEL)	Mapei–GB	+ 2"
10	Mario De Clercq (BEL)	Palmans–Boghemans	+ 2"
