= Tour de Wallonie =

Belgian stage race cycling race

Race details
- Date: Late July – early August
- Region: Wallonia, Belgium
- English name: Tour of Wallonia
- Local name: Tour de Wallonie (in French)
- Discipline: Road
- Competition: UCI ProSeries
- Type: Stage-race
- Web site: www.trworg.be/la-bataille-des-loups/

History
- First edition: 1974
- Editions: 53 (as of 2026)
- First winner: Luc Demets (BEL)
- Most wins: Mario Kummer (DDR); Greg Van Avermaet (BEL) (2 wins)
- Most recent: Corbin Strong (NZL)

The Tour de Wallonie is a stage race cycling race on the UCI Europe Tour. It runs in Wallonia, the French-speaking part of Belgium at the end of July. Between 1974 and 1995, it was reserved to amateurs. Since 2005, the race has been organized as a 2.HC event on the UCI Europe Tour. The race became part of the UCI ProSeries in 2020.

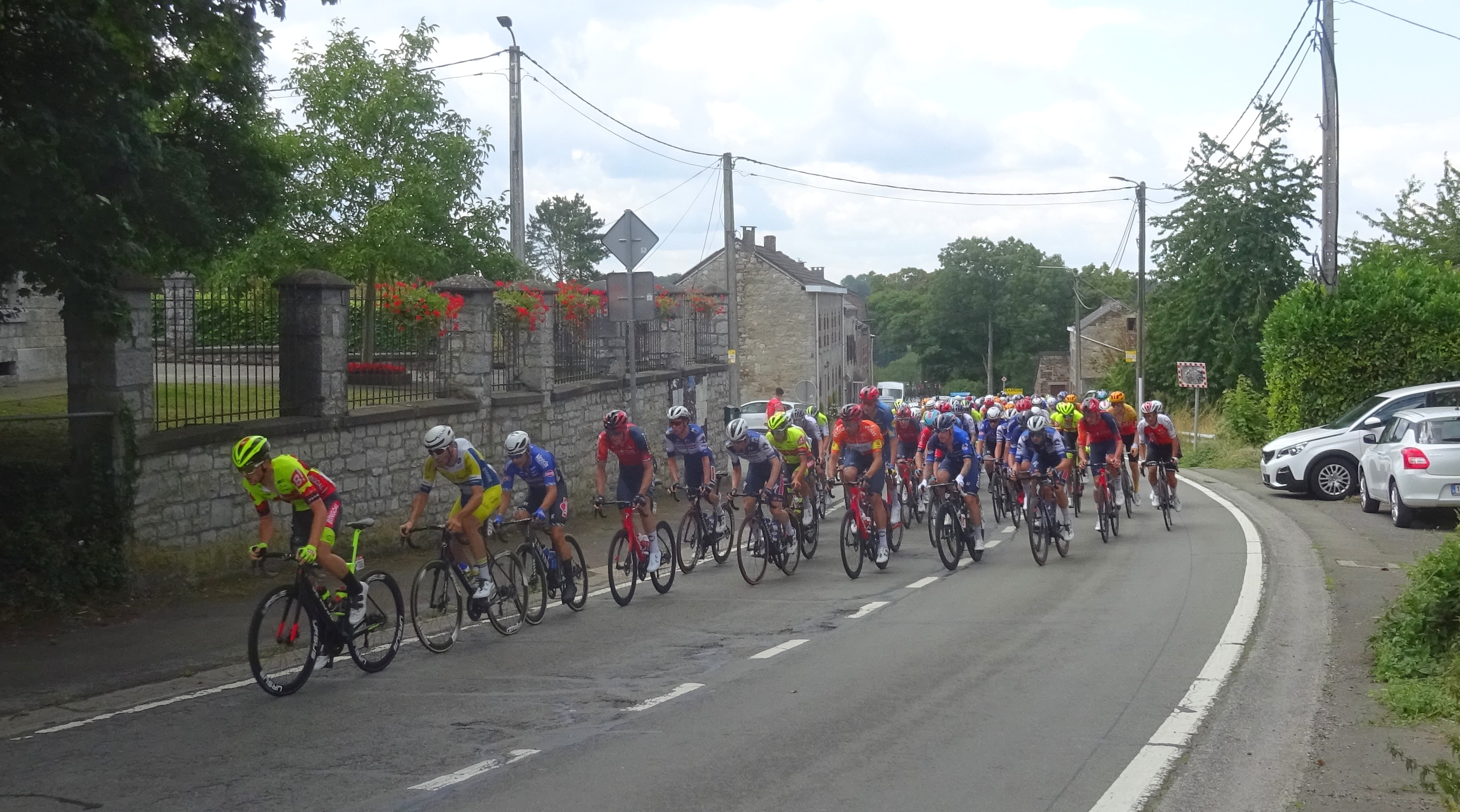
Tour de Wallonie 2023: the peloton passing in Filot

== Winners ==
Year	Country	Rider	Team
1974	Belgium	Luc Demets	
1975	Belgium	Jean-Luc Vandenbroucke	
1976	Belgium	Pierre Leurquin	
1977	Belgium	Alfons De Wolf	
1978	Netherlands	Jo Maas	
1979	Belgium	Ronny Van Holen	
1980	Belgium	Gerrit Van Gestel	
1981	Belgium	Nico Edmonds	
1982	Belgium	Eric Vanderaerden	
1983	Poland	Tadeusz Krawczyk	
1984	East Germany	Mario Kummer	
1985	East Germany	Uwe Ampler	
1986	Italy	Maurizio Fondriest	
1987	East Germany	Mario Kummer	
1988	Netherlands	Joost Van Adrichem	
1989	Belgium	Johan Verstrepen	
1990	France	Pascal Chanteur	
1991	Spain	Abraham Olano	
1992	Germany	Lars Teutenberg	
1993	Italy	Mauro Bettin	
1994	Finland	Joona Laukka	
1995	Italy	Paolo Valoti	
1996	Germany	Thomas Fleischer	Lotto
1997	Belgium	Thierry Marichal	Cédico
1998	Belgium	Frank Vandenbroucke	Mapei–Bricobi
1999	Denmark	Mikael Kyneb	home–Jack & Jones
2000	Belgium	Axel Merckx	Mapei–Quick-Step
2001	Belgium	Glenn D'Hollander	Lotto–Adecco
2002	Italy	Paolo Bettini	Mapei–Quick-Step
2003	New Zealand	Julian Dean	CSC–Tiscali
2004	Netherlands	Gerben Löwik	Chocolade Jacques-Wincor Nixdorf
2005	Italy	Luca Celli	Barloworld
2006	Italy	Fabrizio Guidi	Phonak
2007	Slovenia	Borut Božič	Team LPR
2008	Russia	Sergei Ivanov	Astana
2009	France	Julien El Fares	Cofidis
2010	Great Britain	Russell Downing	Team Sky
2011	Belgium	Greg Van Avermaet	BMC Racing Team
2012	Italy	Giacomo Nizzolo	RadioShack–Nissan
2013	Belgium	Greg Van Avermaet	BMC Racing Team
2014	Belgium	Gianni Meersman	Omega Pharma–Quick-Step
2015	Netherlands	Niki Terpstra	Etixx–Quick-Step
2016	Belgium	Dries Devenyns	IAM Cycling
2017	Belgium	Dylan Teuns	BMC Racing Team
2018	Belgium	Tim Wellens	Lotto–Soudal
2019	Belgium	Loïc Vliegen	Wanty–Gobert
2020	France	Arnaud Démare	Groupama–FDJ
2021	United States	Quinn Simmons	Trek–Segafredo
2022	Australia	Rob Stannard	Alpecin–Fenix
2023	Italy	Filippo Ganna	INEOS Grenadiers
2024	Italy	Matteo Trentin	Tudor Pro Cycling Team
2025	New Zealand	Corbin Strong	Israel–Premier Tech
2026	New Zealand	Ben Oliver	Modern Adventure Pro Cycling
