= Bernard Sainz =

Personal information
- Full name: Bernard Sainz
- Nickname: Dr Mabuse
- Born: August 1, 1943 (age 83) Rennes, France

Cycling career
- Sport: Cycling
- Role: Manager / Doctor

Amateur team
- 1958 onwards: UC Créteil

Managerial team
- 1972 -: Mercier (GAN) Team doctor

Major wins
- None; 1964 3rd in French students' championship

Bernard Sainz, a.k.a. Dr Mabuse, (born Rennes, France, 1 September 1943) is an unlicensed sports doctor who achieved great success in horse racing and cycling. He was jailed for falsely practising medicine, particularly in cycle racing, and received other sentences for doping-related charges, which he consistently denied.

== Background ==
Bernard Sainz began cycle-racing in 1958 when he was 15, riding a race on rollers. He won a bicycle as fastest rider. He joined the UC Créteil a club in the suburbs of Paris. One of his first training companions was Pierre Trentin, a future sprint champion. In 1964 he came third in the French students' championship in his home town. The winner was Jean-Marie Leblanc, who became a professional and then organiser of the Tour de France. He stopped racing after crashing in a motor-paced race on the velodrome at Grenoble

Sainz first consulted a homeopathic doctor in 1956 after persistent sinusitis. Sainz said:

He (the homeopath) was the only one who could cure it (sinusitis) and I remember a doctor who was different, whose approach intrigued and interested me enormously.

Sainz says he studied for three years at the homeopathic school of St Jacques in Paris and at the national homeopathy centre, from which he said he qualified with the praise of the examiners. He has always insisted that he practised homeopathy in treating racing cyclists. He accepts in his biography that his qualifications in homeopathy and acupuncture are not recognised in France.

== Horse racing ==
Bernard Sainz came to notice at horse racing tracks. In 1988 one of his three-year-olds, Soft Machine, caused a surprise by winning a big race three days after losing an unimportant one for which he had been favourite. The suspicion was that Sainz had doped the horse to run faster, but nothing was found. Sainz said:

Vets threw themselves on Soft Machine to take a dope test, sure that he was doped. He had blood analyses and even, it seems, a muscular biopsy.

It was the training that he gave horses and the instructions that he gave his jockeys, he said in his autobiography, that made his horse successful. Sainz said he was surprised, with his cycling background, to see how lightly horses were trained. The accepted theory was that a horse should race and then rest for 18 days.

For someone who had come from a milieu where men were capable of racing 200km a day for three weeks, it was another world! The idea of interval training was unknown. In high-level sport, the difference comes in mastering details. You have to understand all the parametres likely to influence performance.

It was around this time that Sainz acquired the nickname Dr Mabuse, after the villain in a series of German books and films. Sainz was questioned in an inquiry into possible doping of horses. Horse-racing, Sainz said, was an area where he had made few friends and which didn't lack dangerous people.

== Cycling ==
One cyclist said of him:
"I was disappointed when we were introduced. I'd expected to meet the Prince of Darkness. Instead I found myself opposite a quiet man in his 50s, lightly tanned, little Armani glasses on his nose and a cigar between his lips. So this was the magician of doping, the great puppet-master?"

—

Bernard Sainz returned to cycling in 1972, joining the Mercier team when Louis Caput replaced Antonin Magne as manager. Caput approached Edmond Mercier, the bicycle-maker behind Poulidor's team, and asked to bring Sainz into the team management. Mercier agreed, said Sainz, because he was already treating Mercier for his own health problems. Mercier had also brought in the insurance company, GAN, as main sponsor. GAN, said Sainz, wanted Raymond Poulidor, who had said the previous year that he would not race any more. Sainz said:

Louis Caput couldn't stand the idea that such a monument of cycling could leave the sport by the back door. Poulidor agreed to meet me, although insisting that his decision to stop was irrevocable. In the style of a true Limousin, Poupou was reserved and careful, even defiant, but very quickly I sensed that he was attentive to what I was suggesting. I took his pulse for a long time as is the tradition in acupuncture, I examined the iris of his eyes according to the principles of iridology, and the soles of his feet according to the principles of reflexology.

Sainz continued:

From the moment he started training again at home, in the Limousin, he rediscovered lost sensations... He called me three times a week. When he got to the traditional training camp on the Côte d'Azur, far from still believing as he had three months earlier that his career was over, he insisted on riding the races that opened the new season. I was obliged to intervene, to dissuade him, and then in face of his determination, to persuade him not to finish them.

In Paris–Nice, the first important stage race of the season, Poulidor was 22 seconds behind Eddy Merckx on the morning of the last day. Poulidor attacked from the start, setting a speed record on the col de la Turbie that stood for more than 10 years and won Paris–Nice by two seconds. Next year he won Paris–Nice again and also the Dauphiné Libéré.

Sainz also treated Cyrille Guimard when pain in his knees was threatening his lead in the Tour de France. The two had met three years earlier. Sainz kept Guimard in the Tour even though the rider had sometimes to be carried from his bicycle. Sainz said:

It was at the time of our collaboration that the first accusations of doping came. An absurd rumour with a life as long as the Loch Ness monster because I saw it reappear in the Journal du Dimanche on 30 April 2000! For 30 years, people have been saying that I pushed Cyrille beyond his limits and that his knees ended up cracking in the 1972 Tour de France because of my methods. As is often the case, people talk and write, claiming to know everything when they know nothing.

In 1986 he was cleared in an investigation into the trading of amphetamine at the Paris six-day race. He was questioned about illegal practice of medicine and held for two months in 1999. In 2002 police stopped him for speeding and driving without insurance on the E17 autoroute in Belgium and found homeopathic medicines in his car. He told police he had been to see the Belgian cyclist, Frank Vandenbroucke. They went to see Vandenbroucke and found EPO, morphine and clenbuterol. Vandenbroucke claimed they were for his dog.

The investigation brought out other names, such as Philippe Gaumont, who rode with Vandenbroucke at Cofidis and Yvon Ledanois of another team, Française des Jeux. Gaumont said Sainz gave them only homeopathic treatments. Vandenbroucke said he was naive but not dishonest in using Sainz, but that he was impressed at his results.

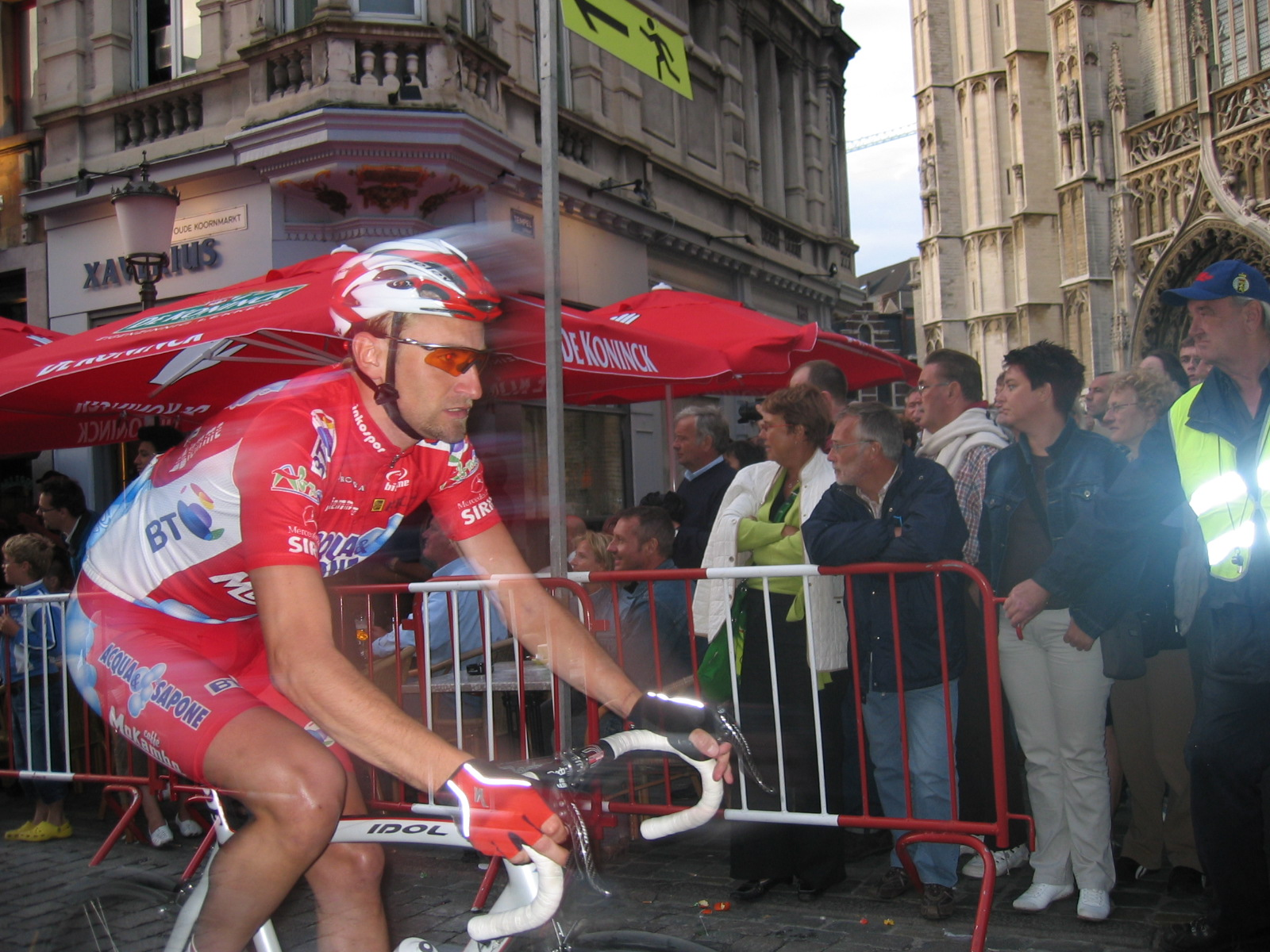
Frank Vandenbroucke

On release from jail in Belgium, Sainz was re-arrested in France for breaking conditions imposed on him in 1999 to keep him away from the sport. Ten used syringes were found in Sainz's office and he was accused of possessing and administering testosterone and corticoids. Sainz said the testosterone was to increase his sexual performance and the corticoids for treating horses. The case was dropped.

Vandenbroucke, however, held a news conference in Ploegsteert, Belgium, to say he had always thought Sainz gave him homeopathic products but that he had doubts. He said Sainz had given him drops and injections. He said:

He (Sainz) said to me that they were completely legal homeopathic products. I wanted to trust him ... I was under the charm of Dr Mabuse. I may be considered naive but I am not a dishonest person. I want to believe that Mr Sainz only gave homeopathic care. I trusted him. Bernard Sainz proposed that he advise me. He seemed to be a strange man but was clearly a cycling expert. He impressed me greatly by showing me photographs of him administering his treatments to greats like Eddy Merckx, Lucien Van Impe, Bernard Hinault, Laurent Fignon, Cyril Guimard and many other great sportsmen like Alain Prost. He explained to me that this care was based on natural methods and alternative medicines without endangering my health nor violating the ethics of our sport.

He paid Sainz 7,000 French francs for the homeopathic drops and 50,000 in fees in the first half of 1999. Sainz said:

I have concerned myself with him since autumn 1998. Not, as has been claimed, to get him doping products. Everybody knows perfectly, starting with the policemen who have listened to me for a long time, that riders don't need me for that sort of thing. To the contrary. If they turn to me, it's because they've heard of what I have been able to do [mes compétences diverses] for the great stars I have cited.

The investigation that surrounded the Vandenbroucke inquiry linked Sainz to 51 athletes, of whom 33 were cyclists and others football players.

== 'Dr' Mabuse ==
Dr Jean-Paul de Mondenard, an author on doping in sport, said:
"Sainz was born with a white jacket on his back and a stéthoscope in his ears.
Bernard is the Canada Dry of the profession: he isn't a doctor but he has the taste."

—

Sainz's standing in cycling has frequently awarded him the title "doctor". The sports daily, L'Équipe spoke of how "Dr Bernard Sainz looked after the health of Louis Caput's team." Three days later it repeated the title in writing of Cyrille Guimard. In 1975 Nord Éclair referred to Sainz as having "had several years of medicine and looks after the medical cares of riders." As Dr Jean-Pierre de Mondenard pointed out: "In fact, the good Bernard did zero years of medicine." In the same year, L'Équipe wrote "Dr Sainz of the GAN team will probably join Gitane." Joop Zoetemelk refers to Sainz as "doctor" in a biography and so does Erwann Menthéour, another former rider.

Menthéour said:

I called the man whom all riders call when they have a problem: Dr Mabuse. For more than 30 years, the good doctor has been a central personality in the cycling world... and in horse-racing! He 'cares for' [soigne] men and horses without distinction, improving their performances with an efficiency universally recognised. A former amateur rider of talent, Mabuse looks after riders by love and horses by interest. My father calls him 'God' because of the fascination he exerts on those who approach him. But despite his powers, which are enormous, Mabuse has none of the exterior signs of a guru. The real power is inside. Everybody recognises his massive but discreet silhouette beside finish lines. He is seen but never mentioned.

== Jail ==
On 11 April 2008, the high court in Paris sentenced Sainz to three years in prison, the first half without release and the second on probationary freedom. He was accused of administering doping products to athletes and practising medicine without a licence. He produced no evidence of medical training at his trial.

== See also ==
- Tour de France
- Doping
- List of doping cases in cycling
