= 1996 GP Ouest-France =

Race details
- Dates: 1 September 1996
- Stages: 1
- Distance: 209 km (129.9 mi)
- Winning time: 4h 52' 01"

Results
	Winner	Frank Vandenbroucke (BEL)	(Mapei–GB)
	Second	Laurent Brochard (FRA)	(Festina–Lotus)
	Third	Andrei Tchmil (BEL)	(Lotto)

The 1996 GP Ouest-France was the 60th edition of the GP Ouest-France cycle race and was held on 1 September 1996. The race started and finished in Plouay. The race was won by Frank Vandenbroucke of the Mapei team.

== General classification ==
Final general classification

Rank	Rider	Team	Time
1	Frank Vandenbroucke (BEL)	Mapei–GB	4h 52' 01"
2	Laurent Brochard (FRA)	Festina–Lotus	+ 30"
3	Andrei Tchmil (BEL)	Lotto	+ 30"
4	Laurent Roux (FRA)	TVM–Farm Frites	+ 30"
5	Angelo Lecchi (ITA)	MG Maglificio–Technogym	+ 30"
6	Germano Pierdomenico (ITA)	Cantina Tollo–Co.Bo.	+ 34"
7	Marco Lietti (ITA)	MG Maglificio–Technogym	+ 36"
8	Nicola Loda (ITA)	MG Maglificio–Technogym	+ 40"
9	Hendrik Redant (BEL)	TVM–Farm Frites	+ 43"
10	Claudio Chiappucci (ITA)	Carrera Jeans–Tassoni	+ 43"
