= 1998 Gent–Wevelgem =

Race details
- Dates: 8 April 1998
- Stages: 1
- Distance: 208 km (129 mi)
- Winning time: 5h 06' 00"

Results
	Winner	Frank Vandenbroucke (BEL)	(Mapei–Bricobi)
	Second	Lars Michaelsen (DEN)	(TVM–Farm Frites)
	Third	Nico Mattan (BEL)	(Mapei–Bricobi)

The 1998 Gent–Wevelgem was the 60th edition of the Belgian Gent–Wevelgem cycle race and was held on 8 April 1998. The race started in Ghent and finished in Wevelgem. The race was won by Frank Vandenbroucke of the Mapei team.

== General classification ==
Final general classification

Rank	Rider	Team	Time
1	Frank Vandenbroucke (BEL)	Mapei–Bricobi	5h 06' 00"
2	Lars Michaelsen (DEN)	TVM–Farm Frites	+ 7"
3	Nico Mattan (BEL)	Mapei–Bricobi	+ 7"
4	Andrei Tchmil (BEL)	Lotto–Mobistar	+ 30"
5	Laurent Desbiens (FRA)	Cofidis	+ 30"
6	Erik Zabel (GER)	Team Telekom	+ 30"
7	Henk Vogels (AUS)	GAN	+ 30"
8	Peter Van Petegem (BEL)	TVM–Farm Frites	+ 30"
9	Jeroen Blijlevens (NED)	TVM–Farm Frites	+ 30"
10	Fabio Baldato (ITA)	Riso Scotti–MG Maglificio	+ 30"
