= Sébastien Demarbaix =

Belgian cyclist

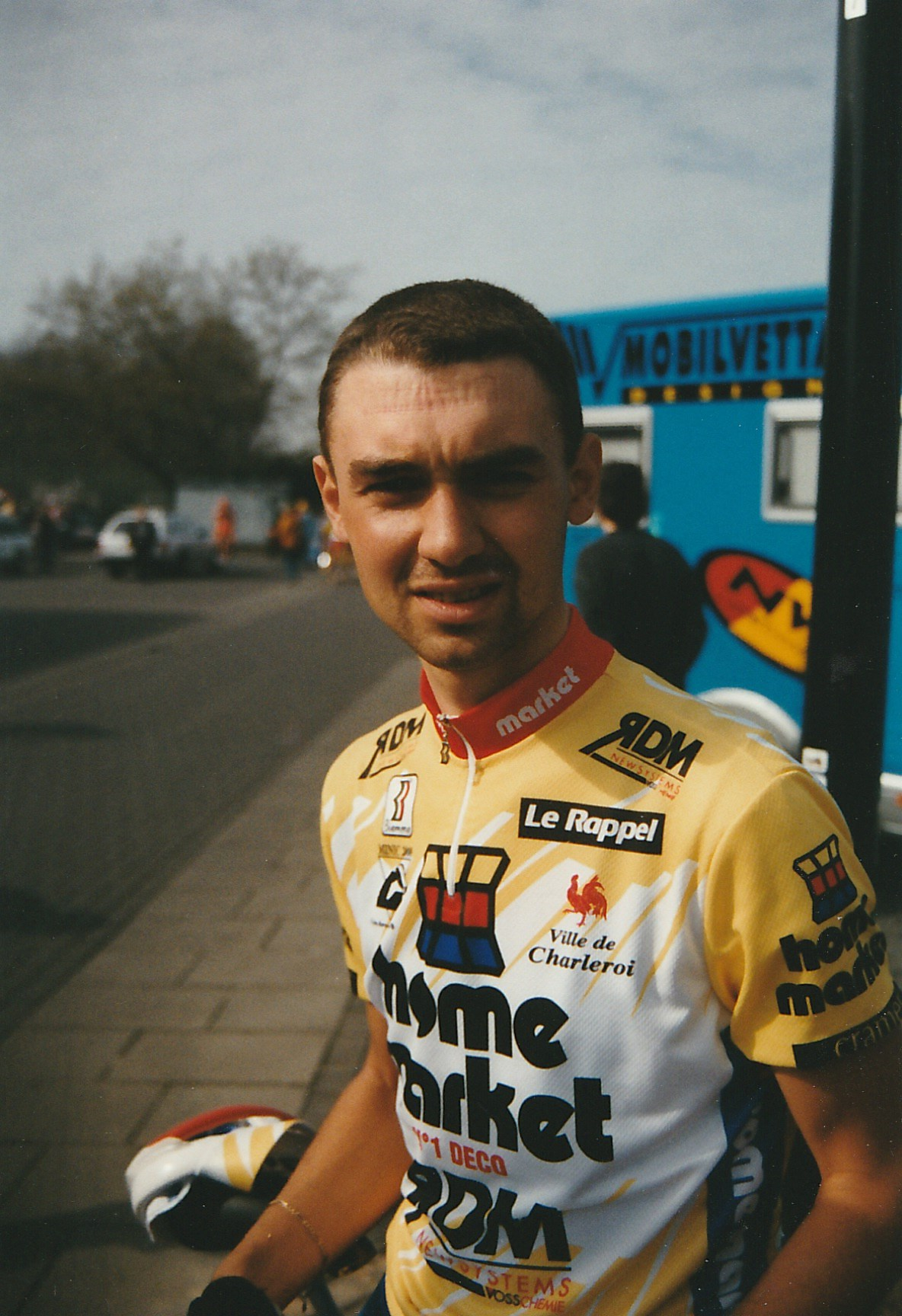
- Demarbaix in 1998

Personal information
- Born: 19 December 1973 (age 52) Lessines, Belgium

Cycling career
- Sport: Cycling
- Current team: Wagner Bazin WB; Bingoal WB Devo Team
- Discipline: Road
- Role: Rider (retired); Directeur sportif

Professional teams
- 1994–1997: Lotto
- 1998: Vlaanderen 2002–Eddy Merckx
- 1999–2000: Lotto–Mobistar
- 2001–2002: AG2R Prévoyance

Managerial teams
- 2013–2020: Accent Jobs–Wanty
- 2021–: Bingoal WB
- 2021–: Bingoal WB Development Team

Sébastien Demarbaix (born 19 December 1973) is a Belgian former racing cyclist, who rode in three editions of the Tour de France. He currently works as a directeur sportif for UCI ProTeam Wagner Bazin WB and its junior team, UCI Continental team Bingoal WB Devo Team.

== Major results ==
1994
1st Stage 5 Tour de Wallonie
1998
2nd Stadsprijs Geraardsbergen
1999
3rd Japan Cup
