= Luca Celli =

Italian cyclist

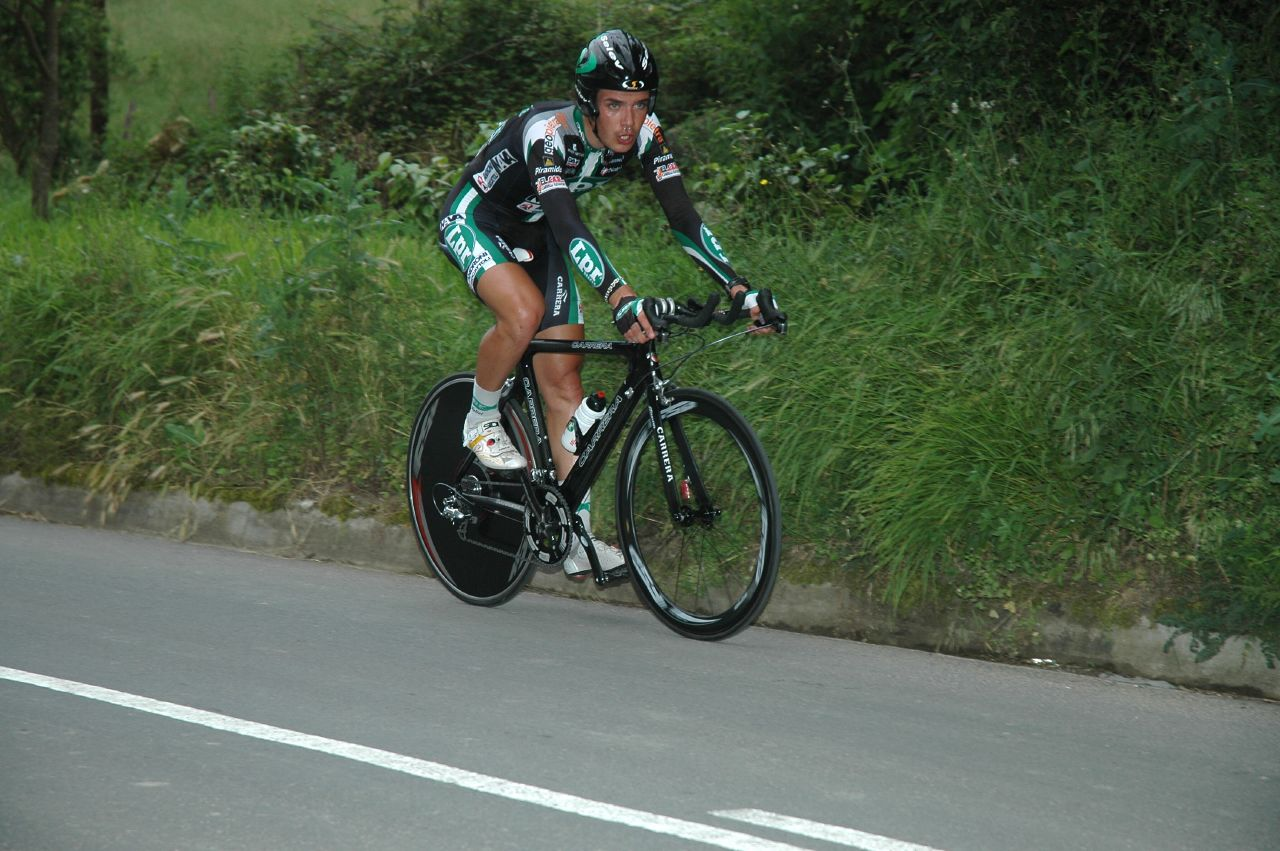

Personal information
- Born: 23 February 1979 (age 47) Forlimpopoli, Italy

Cycling career
- Sport: Cycling
- Current team: Retired
- Discipline: Road
- Role: Rider

Professional teams
- 2004: Vini Caldirola–Nobili Rubinetterie
- 2005: Barloworld
- 2006: Acqua & Sapone
- 2007–2008: Team LPR
- 2009: Diquigiovanni–Androni
- 2010: Ceramica Flaminia

Luca Celli (born 23 February 1979 in Forlimpopoli) is an Italian former professional cyclist.

== Major results ==
2004
5th Châteauroux Classic
2005
1st Overall Tour de Wallonie

1st Stage 1

2007
2nd Overall Rheinland-Pfalz Rundfahrt

1st Stage 3

4th National Time Trial Championships
8th Gran Premio Bruno Beghelli
2008
2nd National Time Trial Championships
2nd Coppa Bernocchi
7th Giro di Romagna
9th Memorial Marco Pantani
10th Overall Tour of Belgium
