= Thomas Fleischer =

German cyclist (born 1971)

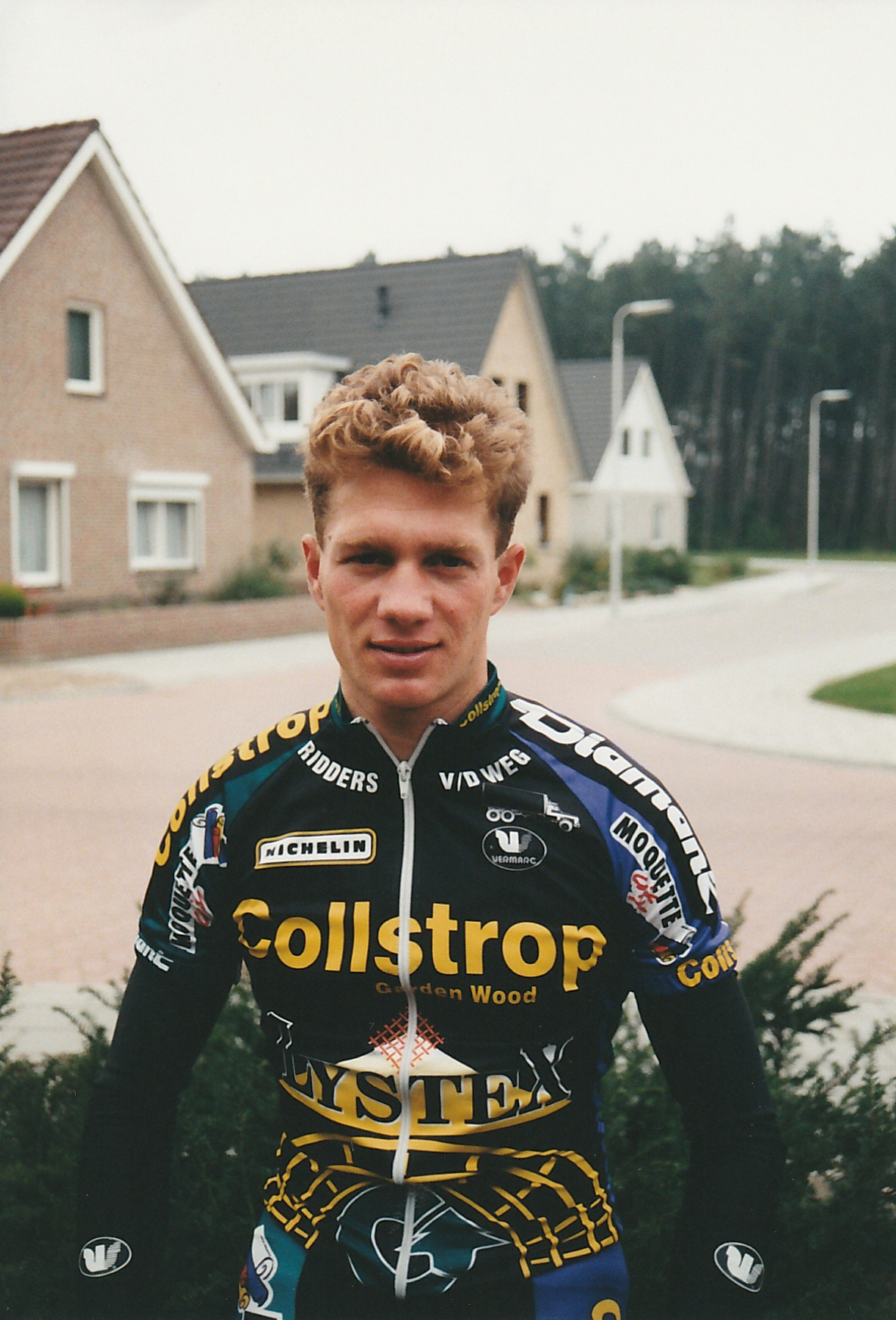

Personal information
- Born: 20 February 1971 (age 55)

Cycling career
- Sport: Cycling
- Role: Rider

Thomas Fleischer (born 20 February 1971) is a German racing cyclist. He rode in the 1996 Tour de France.
