= Thierry Marichal =

Belgian cyclist

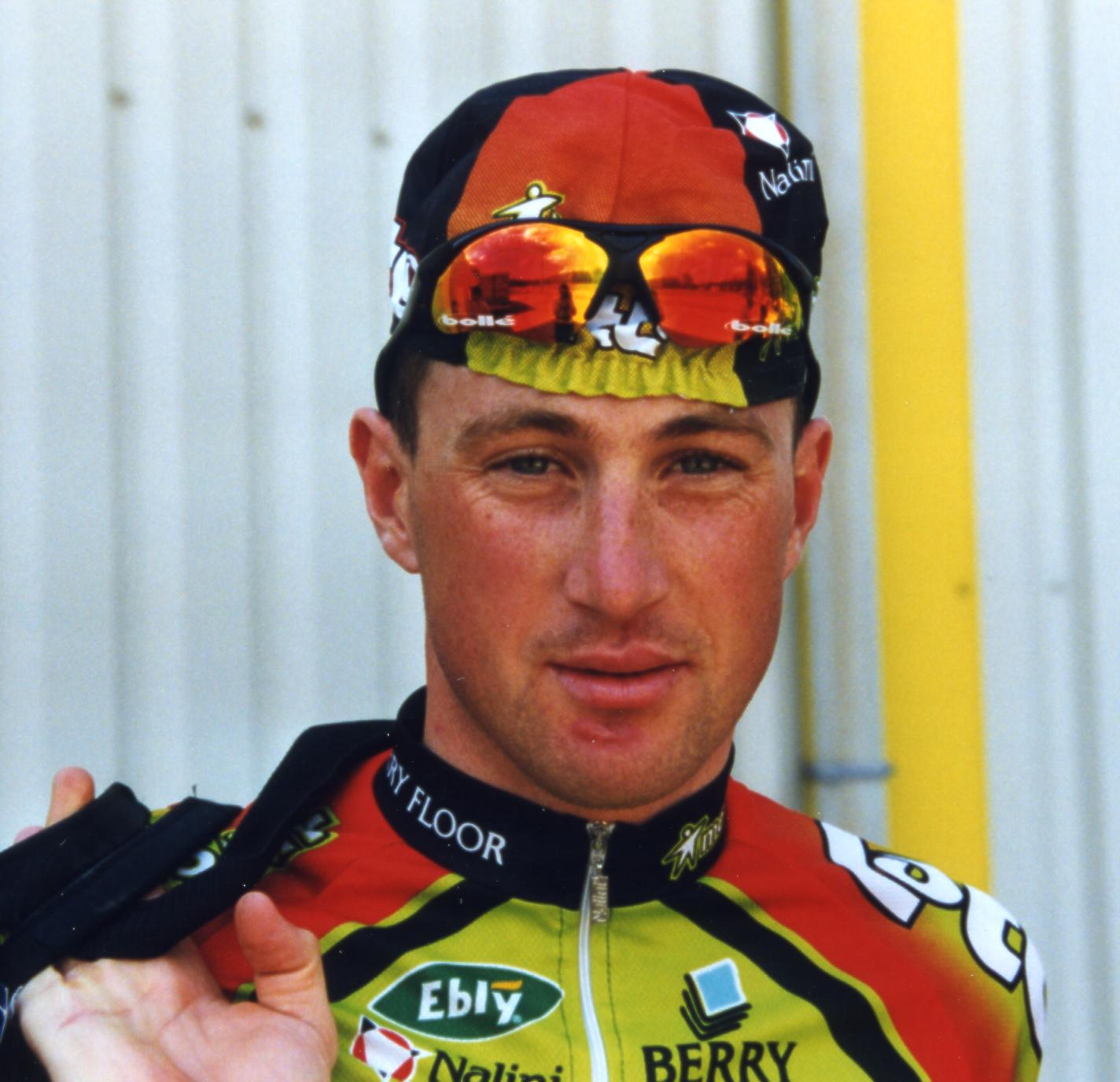

Personal information
- Full name: Thierry Marichal
- Born: 13 June 1973 (age 53) Leuze-en-Hainaut, Belgium
- Height: 1.79 m (5 ft 10 in)
- Weight: 72 kg (159 lb)

Cycling career
- Sport: Cycling
- Current team: Retired
- Discipline: Road
- Role: Rider

Professional teams
- 1996–1997: Cedico
- 1998–2004: Lotto
- 2005–2006: Cofidis
- 2007: Française des Jeux

Major wins
- Tour de la Région Wallonne (1997)

Thierry Marichal (born 13 June 1973 in Leuze-en-Hainaut) is a Belgian former professional road bicycle racer. Marichal became a sports director with Cofidis after finishing his riding career.

== Major results ==
- Duo Normand (2005-with Sylvain Chavanel)
- Bayern-Rundfahrt – 1 stage (2000)
- Circuit Franco-Belge – 1 stage (2000)
- Tour de l'Oise – 1 stage (1999)
- GP Fayt-le-Franc (1999)
- 3rd, National Time Trial Championship (1999)
- Tour de Wallonie – Overall (1997)
