= Glenn D'Hollander =

Belgian cyclist

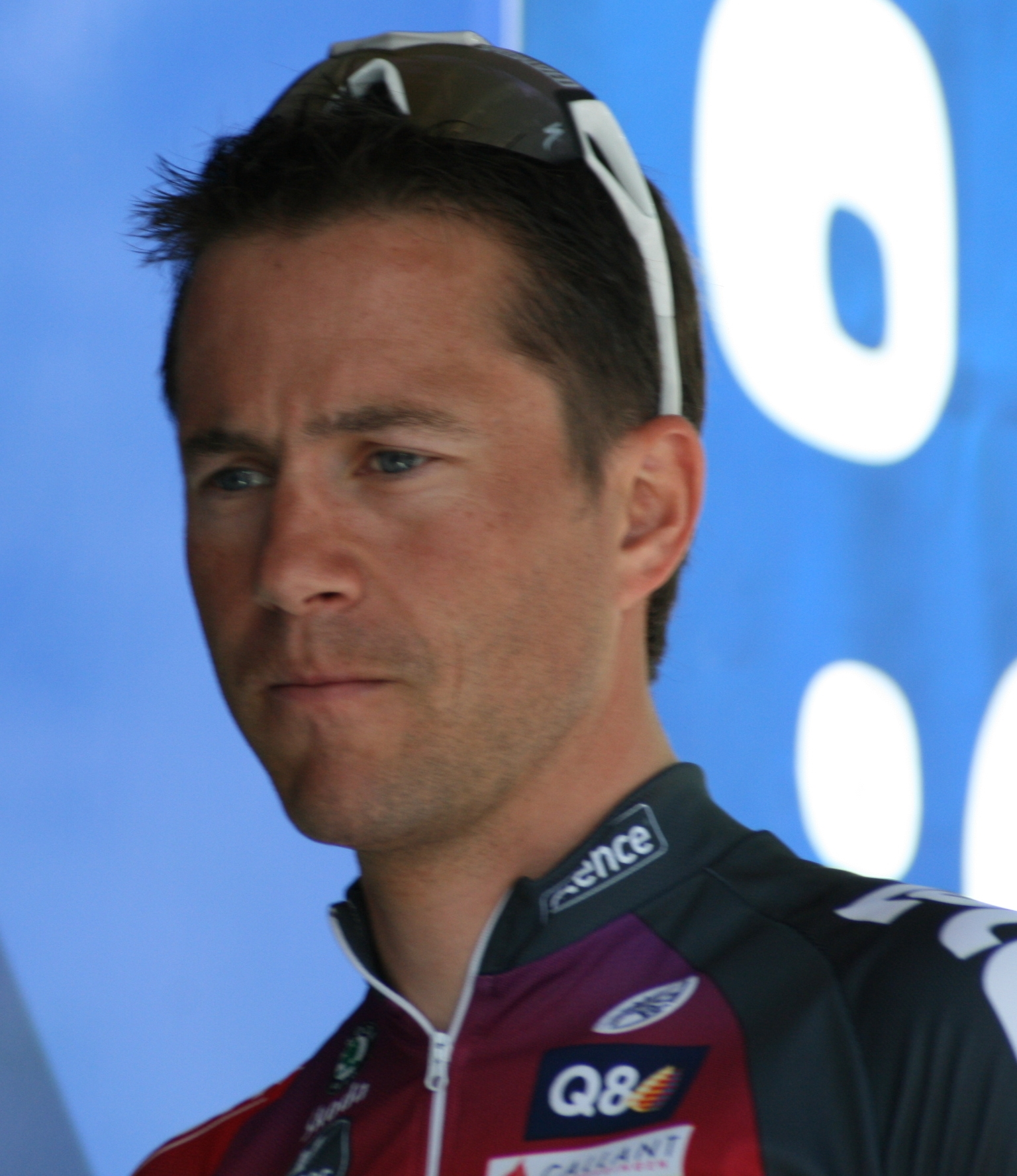

Personal information
- Full name: Glenn D'Hollander
- Born: 28 December 1974 (age 51) Sint-Niklaas, Belgium

Cycling career
- Sport: Cycling
- Current team: Retired
- Discipline: Road
- Role: Rider

Professional teams
- 1996–1999: Vlaanderen 2002–Eddy Merckx
- 2000–2004: Lotto–Adecco
- 2005: Landbouwkrediet–Colnago
- 2006–2007: Chocolade Jacques–Topsport Vlaanderen
- 2008–2010: Silence–Lotto

Glenn D'Hollander (born 28 December 1974) is a Belgian former professional road bicycle racer. Fellow professional cyclist Greg Van Avermaet is his brother-in-law.

== Palmarès ==
1991
2nd, National U17 Road Race Championship
1992
Belgium U19 Time Trial Champion
1994
3rd, National Amateur Road Race Championship
1995
1st, GP Bodson
1st, Stage 3, Triptyque Ardennais
1st, Stage 8, Tour de Wallonie
3rd, Overall, Tour of Austria
1996
1st, Schaal Sels
1st, Stage 10, Tour of Austria
3rd, Overall, Tour de l'Avenir
1997
1st, Stage 6, Tour de Wallonie
1998
1st, Eurode Omloop
1999
2nd, Overall, Circuito Montañés

Winner Stage 1

2001
1st, Overall, Tour de Wallonie

Winner Stage 3

1st, Stage 1, UNIQA Classic
3rd, National Time Trial Championship
2002
1st, Stage 3, Étoile de Bessèges
