= List of teams and cyclists in the 1988 Tour de France =

List of cyclists

The number of riders per nation participated in the 1988 Tour de France: 20+ / 10–19 / 2–9 / 1

The 1988 Tour de France started with 198 cyclists, divided into 22 teams of 9 cyclists. The 22 teams, announced two weeks before the Tour, were:

== Teams ==
- Carrera Jeans–Vagabond
- PDM–Ultima–Concorde
- Toshiba–Look
- Système U–Gitane
- Café de Colombia
- BH
- 7-Eleven–Hoonved
- Caja Rural–Orbea
- Hitachi–Bosal–B.C.E. Snooker
- Chateau d'Ax
- Fagor–MBK
- Panasonic–Isostar–Colnago–Agu
- Z–Peugeot
- Teka
- Kas–Canal 10
- RMO–Cycles Méral–Mavic
- Superconfex–Yoko–Opel–Colnago
- Reynolds
- Kelme
- Weinmann–La Suisse–SMM Uster
- AD Renting–Anti-M–Bottecchia
- Sigma–Fina

== Cyclists ==
=== By starting number ===
Legend
No.	Starting number worn by the rider during the Tour
Pos.	Position in the general classification
Time	Deficit to the winner of the general classification
General classification	Denotes the winner of the general classification
Points classification	Denotes the winner of the points classification
Mountains classification	Denotes the winner of the mountains classification
Young rider classification	Denotes the winner of the young rider classification
Intermediate Sprint classification	Denotes the winner of the intermediate sprints classification
Combination classification	Denotes the winner of the combination classification
Team classification	Denotes the winner of the team classification
Combativity award	Denotes the winner of the combativity award
DNF	Denotes a rider who did not finish
NP	Denotes a rider who was a non-participant
AB	Denotes a rider who abandoned
HD	Denotes a rider who was outside the time limit (French: Hors Delai)
Age correct as of 4 July 1988, the date on which the Tour began

No.	Name	Nationality	Team	Age	Pos.	Time	Ref
1	Urs Zimmermann	Switzerland	Carrera Jeans–Vagabond	28	DNF (AB-15)	—	
2	Marco Bergamo	Italy	Carrera Jeans–Vagabond	24	109	+ 2h 05' 43"	
3	Guido Bontempi	Italy	Carrera Jeans–Vagabond	28	106	+ 1h 59' 07"	
4	Massimo Ghirotto	Italy	Carrera Jeans–Vagabond	27	85	+ 1h 35' 02"	
5	Bruno Leali	Italy	Carrera Jeans–Vagabond	30	77	+ 1h 30' 50"	
6	Erich Maechler	Switzerland	Carrera Jeans–Vagabond	27	136	+ 2h 29' 37"	
7	Walter Magnago	Italy	Carrera Jeans–Vagabond	27	141	+ 2h 37' 52"	
8	Marco Tabai	Italy	Carrera Jeans–Vagabond	26	146	+ 2h 46' 16"	
9	Roberto Visentini	Italy	Carrera Jeans–Vagabond	31	22	+ 33' 23"	
11	Steven Rooks	Netherlands	PDM	27	2	+ 7' 13"	
12	Andy Bishop	United States	PDM	23	135	+ 2h 29' 00"	
13	Rudy Dhaenens	Belgium	PDM	27	87	+ 1h 36' 16"	
14	Gerrie Knetemann	Netherlands	PDM	37	DNF (AB-6)	—	
15	Jörg Müller	Switzerland	PDM	27	27	+ 40' 53"	
16	Peter Stevenhaagen	Netherlands	PDM	23	29	+ 45' 27"	
17	Gert-Jan Theunisse	Netherlands	PDM	25	11	+ 22' 46"	
18	Adri van der Poel	Netherlands	PDM	29	84	+ 1h 34' 43"	
19	Marc van Orsouw	Netherlands	PDM	24	76	+ 1h 30' 36"	
21	Jean-François Bernard	France	Toshiba	26	DNF (AB-15)	—	
22	Frédéric Garnier	France	Toshiba	24	108	+ 2h 02' 52"	
23	Martial Gayant	France	Toshiba	25	71	+ 1h 25' 30"	
24	Jacques Hanegraaf	Netherlands	Toshiba	27	119	+ 2h 12' 11"	
25	Andreas Kappes	West Germany	Toshiba	22	110	+ 2h 06' 02"	
26	Johan Lammerts	Netherlands	Toshiba	27	130	+ 2h 23' 17"	
27	Philippe Leleu	France	Toshiba	30	65	+ 1h 21' 51"	
28	Marc Madiot	France	Toshiba	29	66	+ 1h 22' 34"	
29	Yvon Madiot	France	Toshiba	26	DNF (AB-16)	—	
31	Laurent Fignon	France	Système U	27	DNF (NP-12)	—	
32	Éric Boyer	France	Système U	24	5	+ 14' 04"	
33	Jacques Decrion	France	Système U	26	72	+ 1h 26' 44"	
34	Dominique Garde	France	Système U	29	93	+ 1h 46' 44"	
35	Christophe Lavainne	France	Système U	24	67	+ 1h 22' 34"	
36	Thierry Marie	France	Système U	25	98	+ 1h 51' 11"	
37	Charly Mottet	France	Système U	25	DNF (AB-15)	—	
38	Joël Pelier	France	Système U	26	120	+ 2h 13' 28"	
39	Pascal Simon	France	Système U	31	17	+ 28' 39"	
41	Luis Herrera	Colombia	Café de Colombia	27	6	+ 14' 36"	
42	Samuel Cabrera	Colombia	Café de Colombia	27	31	+ 46' 06"	
43	Julio César Cadena	Colombia	Café de Colombia	24	42	+ 1h 01' 28"	
44	Henry Cárdenas	Colombia	Café de Colombia	22	DNF (AB-4)	—	
45	Edgar Corredor	Colombia	Café de Colombia	28	41	+ 1h 01' 20"	
46	Israel Corredor	Colombia	Café de Colombia	28	49	+ 1h 07' 50"	
47	José Patrocinio Jiménez	Colombia	Café de Colombia	35	51	+ 1h 09' 55"	
48	Marco Antonio León	Colombia	Café de Colombia	25	73	+ 1h 26' 58"	
49	Martín Ramírez	Colombia	Café de Colombia	27	DNF (NP-21)	—	
51	Anselmo Fuerte	Spain	BH	26	DNF (AB-12)	—	
52	Francisco Antequera	Spain	BH	24	121	+ 2h 13' 55"	
53	Philippe Bouvatier	France	BH	24	32	+ 48' 14"	
54	Laudelino Cubino Gonzalez	Spain	BH	25	13	+ 23' 46"	
55	Manuel Jorge Domínguez	Spain	BH	25	128	+ 2h 20' 59"	
56	Federico Echave	Spain	BH	27	25	+ 39' 17"	
57	Javier Murguialday	Spain	BH	26	114	+ 2h 09' 32"	
58	Jørgen Pedersen	Denmark	BH	28	26	+ 39' 24"	
59	Álvaro Pino	Spain	BH	31	8	+ 18' 36"	
61	Andrew Hampsten	United States	7 Eleven–Hoonved	26	15	+ 26' 00"	
62	Raúl Alcalá	Mexico	7 Eleven–Hoonved	24	20	+ 31' 14"	
63	Ron Kiefel	United States	7 Eleven–Hoonved	28	69	+1h 23' 58"	
64	Roy Knickman	United States	7 Eleven–Hoonved	23	DNF (HD-18)	—	
65	Dag Otto Lauritzen	Norway	7 Eleven–Hoonved	31	34	+ 50' 08"	
66	Davis Phinney	United States	7 Eleven–Hoonved	28	105	+ 1h 58' 08"	
67	Jeff Pierce	United States	7 Eleven–Hoonved	29	DNF (HD-19)	—	
68	Nathan Dahlberg	New Zealand	7 Eleven–Hoonved	24	144	+ 2h 42' 46"	
69	Jens Veggerby	Denmark	7 Eleven–Hoonved	25	113	+ 2h 09' 27"	
71	Marino Lejarreta	Spain	Caja Rural–Orbea	31	16	+ 26' 36"	
72	René Beuker	Netherlands	Caja Rural–Orbea	23	DNF (AB-15)	—	
73	Roque de la Cruz	Spain	Caja Rural–Orbea	23	104	+ 1h 57' 52"	
74	Mathieu Hermans	Netherlands	Caja Rural–Orbea	25	147	+ 2h 48' 53"	
75	Roland Le Clerc	France	Caja Rural–Orbea	25	70	+ 1h 25' 17"	
76	Jokin Mújika	Spain	Caja Rural–Orbea	25	63	+ 1h 19' 15"	
77	Erwin Nijboer	Netherlands	Caja Rural–Orbea	24	DNF (AB-15)	—	
78	Vicente Ridaura	Spain	Caja Rural–Orbea	24	107	+ 2h 01' 31"	
79	José Salvador Sanchis	Spain	Caja Rural–Orbea	25	111	+ 2h 07' 00"	
81	Claude Criquielion	Belgium	Hitachi–Bosal–BCE	31	14	+ 24' 32"	
82	Bruno Bruyere	Belgium	Hitachi–Bosal–BCE	22	DNF (NP-14)	—	
83	Dirk De Wolf	Belgium	Hitachi–Bosal–BCE	27	80	+ 1h 33' 25"	
84	Jos Haex	Belgium	Hitachi–Bosal–BCE	28	56	+ 1h 15' 16"	
85	Stefan Morjean	Belgium	Hitachi–Bosal–BCE	28	101	+ 1h 54' 56"	
86	Marc Sergeant	Belgium	Hitachi–Bosal–BCE	28	33	+ 49' 24"	
87	Jean-Philippe Vandenbrande	Belgium	Hitachi–Bosal–BCE	32	37	+ 57' 57"	
88	Wiebren Veenstra	Netherlands	Hitachi–Bosal–BCE	21	DNF (NP-10)	—	
89	Jan Wijnants	Belgium	Hitachi–Bosal–BCE	29	96	+ 1h 49' 56"	
91	Gianni Bugno	Italy	Chateau d'Ax	24	62	+ 1h 19' 09"	
92	Roberto Amadio	Italy	Chateau d'Ax	24	DNF (NP-16)	—	
93	Stefano Giuliani	Italy	Chateau d'Ax	30	DNF (AB-12)	—	
94	Milan Jurčo	Czechoslovakia	Chateau d'Ax	30	139	+ 2h 35' 45"	
95	Alessandro Pozzi	Italy	Chateau d'Ax	33	79	+ 1h 32' 19"	
96	Tony Rominger	Switzerland	Chateau d'Ax	27	68	+ 1h 23' 41"	
97	Valerio Tebaldi	Italy	Chateau d'Ax	23	DNF (AB-19)	—	
98	Ennio Vanotti	Italy	Chateau d'Ax	32	86	+ 1h 36' 03"	
99	Stefano Zanatta	Italy	Chateau d'Ax	24	142	+ 2h 38' 23"	
101	Robert Millar	Great Britain	Fagor	29	DNF (AB-18)	—	
102	Jean-Claude Bagot	France	Fagor	30	39	+ 59' 47"	
103	Charly Bérard	France	Fagor	32	40	+ 1h 00' 08"	
104	Malcolm Elliott	Great Britain	Fagor	27	90	+ 1h 44' 27"	
105	Pedro Muñoz	Spain	Fagor	29	DNF (AB-12)	—	
106	Bernard Richard	France	Fagor	30	DNF (AB-19)	—	
107	Eddy Schepers	Belgium	Fagor	32	DNF (AB-12)	—	
108	Johnny Weltz	Denmark	Fagor	26	54	+ 1h 12' 49"	
109	Sean Yates	Great Britain	Fagor	28	59	+ 1h 17' 25"	
111	Erik Breukink	Netherlands	Panasonic–Isostar	24	12	+ 23' 06"	
112	Theo de Rooij	Netherlands	Panasonic–Isostar	31	DNF (AB-18)	—	
113	Henk Lubberding	Netherlands	Panasonic–Isostar	34	DNF (AB-20)	—	
114	Guy Nulens	Belgium	Panasonic–Isostar	30	38	+ 59' 13"	
115	John Talen	Netherlands	Panasonic–Isostar	23	150	+ 3h 05' 02"	
116	Eric Vanderaerden	Belgium	Panasonic–Isostar	26	DNF (AB-12)	—	
117	Eric Van Lancker	Belgium	Panasonic–Isostar	27	74	+ 1h 28' 37"	
118	Teun van Vliet	Netherlands	Panasonic–Isostar	26	DNF (NP-9)	—	
119	Peter Winnen	Netherlands	Panasonic–Isostar	30	9	+ 19' 12"	
121	Ronan Pensec	France	Z–Peugeot	24	7	+ 16' 52"	
122	Henri Abadie	France	Z–Peugeot	25	44	+ 1h 01' 59"	
123	Frédéric Brun	France	Z–Peugeot	30	81	+ 1h 33' 32"	
124	Philippe Casado	France	Z–Peugeot	24	129	+ 2h 21' 31"	
125	Bruno Cornillet	France	Z–Peugeot	25	DNF (NP-11)	—	
126	Gilbert Duclos-Lassalle	France	Z–Peugeot	33	36	+ 57' 21"	
127	Atle Kvålsvoll	Norway	Z–Peugeot	26	DNF (NP-16)	—	
128	Denis Roux	France	Z–Peugeot	26	10	+ 20' 08"	
129	Jérôme Simon	France	Z–Peugeot	27	19	+ 30' 55"	
131	Reimund Dietzen	West Germany	Teka	29	83	+ 1h 34' 25"	
132	Enrique Alberto Aja Cagigas	Spain	Teka	28	64	+ 1h 19' 52"	
133	Jesús Blanco Villar	Spain	Teka	25	35	+ 55' 28"	
134	Ángel Camarillo Llorens	Spain	Teka	29	116	+ 2h 10' 29"	
135	Régis Clère	France	Teka	31	94	+ 1h 47' 13"	
136	Arsenio González	Spain	Teka	28	97	+ 1h 50' 13"	
137	Alfonso Gutiérrez	Spain	Teka	26	DNF (HD-13)	—	
138	Carlos Hernández Bailo	Spain	Teka	29	DNF (NP-16)	—	
139	Mariano Sánchez Martinez	Spain	Teka	29	57	+ 1h 16' 06"	
141	Sean Kelly	Ireland	KAS–Canal 10–Mavic	32	46	+ 1h 02' 54"	
142	Alfred Achermann	Switzerland	KAS–Canal 10–Mavic	28	125	+ 2h 19' 26"	
143	Éric Caritoux	France	KAS–Canal 10–Mavic	27	18	+ 29' 04"	
144	Acácio da Silva	Portugal	KAS–Canal 10–Mavic	27	92	+ 1h 45' 26"	
145	Martin Earley	Ireland	KAS–Canal 10–Mavic	26	DNF (AB-17)	—	
146	Celestino Prieto	Spain	KAS–Canal 10–Mavic	27	117	+ 2h 11' 16"	
147	Gilles Sanders	France	KAS–Canal 10–Mavic	23	DNF (AB-19)	—	
148	Jon Unzaga	Spain	KAS–Canal 10–Mavic	25	53	+ 1h 12' 17"	
149	Guido Van Calster	Belgium	KAS–Canal 10–Mavic	32	DNF (AB-11)	—	
151	Patrice Esnault	France	RMO–Liberia–Mavic	27	78	+ 1h 30' 59"	
152	Michel Bibollet	France	RMO–Liberia–Mavic	25	88	+ 1h 38' 14"	
153	Hartmut Bölts	West Germany	RMO–Liberia–Mavic	27	140	+ 2h 36' 26"	
154	Thierry Claveyrolat	France	RMO–Liberia–Mavic	29	23	+ 37' 49"	
155	Jean-Claude Colotti	France	RMO–Liberia–Mavic	21	55	+ 1h 15' 00"	
156	Gilles Mas	France	RMO–Liberia–Mavic	27	DNF (AB-19)	—	
157	Dante Rezze	France	RMO–Liberia–Mavic	25	100	+ 1h 53' 03"	
158	Régis Simon	France	RMO–Liberia–Mavic	30	123	+ 2h 18' 18"	
159	Michel Vermote	Belgium	RMO–Liberia–Mavic	25	133	+ 2h 27' 00"	
161	Rolf Gölz	West Germany	Superconfex–Yoko–Opel	25	91	+ 1h 44' 47"	
162	Gert Jakobs	Netherlands	Superconfex–Yoko–Opel	24	145	+ 2h 45' 28"	
163	Frans Maassen	Netherlands	Superconfex–Yoko–Opel	23	126	+ 2h 19' 43"	
164	Jelle Nijdam	Netherlands	Superconfex–Yoko–Opel	24	122	+ 2h 15' 59"	
165	Ludo Peeters	Belgium	Superconfex–Yoko–Opel	34	89	+ 1h 42' 47"	
166	Twan Poels	Netherlands	Superconfex–Yoko–Opel	24	127	+ 2h 20' 02"	
167	Gerrit Solleveld	Netherlands	Superconfex–Yoko–Opel	27	132	+ 2h 26' 56"	
168	Jean-Paul van Poppel	Netherlands	Superconfex–Yoko–Opel	25	138	+ 2h 35' 09"	
169	Nico Verhoeven	Netherlands	Superconfex–Yoko–Opel	26	143	+ 2h 42' 20"	
171	Pedro Delgado	Spain	Reynolds	28	1	84h 27' 53"	
172	Dominique Arnaud	France	Reynolds	32	48	+ 1h 07' 31"	
173	Ángel Arroyo	Spain	Reynolds	31	DNF (AB-15)	—	
174	Herminio Díaz Zabala	Spain	Reynolds	23	118	+ 2h 11' 42"	
175	Julián Gorospe	Spain	Reynolds	28	60	+ 1h 17' 33"	
176	Omar Hernández	Colombia	Reynolds	26	DNF (AB-19)	—	
177	Miguel Induráin	Spain	Reynolds	23	47	+ 1h 03' 15"	
178	Luis Javier Lukin	Spain	Reynolds	24	82	+ 1h 34' 00"	
179	Jesús Rodríguez Magro	Spain	Reynolds	28	52	+ 1h 11' 17"	
181	Fabio Parra	Colombia	Kelme	28	3	+ 9' 58"	
182	Vicente Belda	Spain	Kelme	33	75	+ 1h 29' 29"	
183	Eduardo Chozas	Spain	Kelme	27	30	+ 45' 45"	
184	Antonio Coll Pontanilla	Spain	Kelme	29	DNF (AB-5)	—	
185	Iñaki Gastón	Spain	Kelme	25	112	+ 2h 07' 49"	
186	Ricardo Martínez	Spain	Kelme	24	DNF (AB-7)	—	
187	Juan Martínez Oliver	Spain	Kelme	24	134	+ 2h 27' 44"	
188	José Recio	Spain	Kelme	31	DNF (AB-12)	—	
189	Jaime Vilamajó	Spain	Kelme	28	DNF (NP-6)	—	
191	Niki Rüttimann	Switzerland	Weinmann–La Suisse–SMM Uster	25	43	+ 1h 01' 43"	
192	Steve Bauer	Canada	Weinmann–La Suisse–SMM Uster	29	4	+ 12' 15"	
193	Jean-Claude Leclercq	France	Weinmann–La Suisse–SMM Uster	25	58	+ 1h 17' 21"	
194	Pascal Richard	Switzerland	Weinmann–La Suisse–SMM Uster	24	DNF (AB-3)	—	
195	Gerard Veldscholten	Netherlands	Weinmann–La Suisse–SMM Uster	28	45	+ 1h 02' 32"	
196	Frédéric Vichot	France	Weinmann–La Suisse–SMM Uster	29	28	+ 42' 00"	
197	Michael Wilson	Australia	Weinmann–La Suisse–SMM Uster	28	50	+ 1h 09' 31"	
198	Guido Winterberg	Switzerland	Weinmann–La Suisse–SMM Uster	25	DNF (NP-16)	—	
199	Gerhard Zadrobilek	Austria	Weinmann–La Suisse–SMM Uster	27	21	+ 32' 09"	
201	Dirk Demol	Belgium	ADR–Mini Fiat–IOC	28	149	+ 2h 55' 18"	
202	Alfons De Wolf	Belgium	ADR–Mini Fiat–IOC	32	102	+ 1h 55' 56"	
203	Frank Hoste	Belgium	ADR–Mini Fiat–IOC	32	124	+ 2h 18' 50"	
204	Jaanus Kuum	Norway	ADR–Mini Fiat–IOC	23	24	+ 38' 53"	
205	René Martens	Belgium	ADR–Mini Fiat–IOC	33	131	+ 2h 24' 52"	
206	Johan Museeuw	Belgium	ADR–Mini Fiat–IOC	22	DNF (AB-18)	—	
207	Patrick Onnockx	Belgium	ADR–Mini Fiat–IOC	28	DNF (AB-18)	—	
208	Eddy Planckaert	Belgium	ADR–Mini Fiat–IOC	29	115	+ 2h 09' 34"	
209	Dirk Wayenberg	Belgium	ADR–Mini Fiat–IOC	32	151	+ 3h 28' 41"	
211	Hennie Kuiper	Netherlands	Sigma–Fina–Diamant	39	95	+ 1h 49' 37"	
212	Etienne De Wilde	Belgium	Sigma–Fina–Diamant	30	103	+ 1h 57' 17"	
213	Jean-Pierre Heynderickx	Belgium	Sigma–Fina–Diamant	23	148	+ 2h 54' 07"	
214	Roger Ilegems	Belgium	Sigma–Fina–Diamant	25	DNF (HD-12)	—	
215	Søren Lilholt	Denmark	Sigma–Fina–Diamant	22	99	+ 1h 51' 58"	
216	Jan Nevens	Belgium	Sigma–Fina–Diamant	29	61	+ 1h 18' 11"	
217	Rik Van Slycke	Belgium	Sigma–Fina–Diamant	25	137	+ 2h 33' 03"	
218	Willem Wijnant	Belgium	Sigma–Fina–Diamant	26	DNF (HD-12)	—	
219	Ludwig Wijnants	Belgium	Sigma–Fina–Diamant	32	DNF (HD-13)	—	

=== By team ===
Carrera Jeans–Vagabond
No.	Rider	Pos.
1	Urs Zimmermann (SUI)	AB-15
2	Marco Bergamo (ITA)	109
3	Guido Bontempi (ITA)	106
4	Massimo Ghirotto (ITA)	85
5	Bruno Leali (ITA)	77
6	Erich Maechler (SUI)	136
7	Walter Magnago (ITA)	141
8	Marco Tabai (ITA)	146
9	Roberto Visentini (ITA)	22
Directeur sportif: Davide Boifava

PDM
No.	Rider	Pos.
11	Steven Rooks (NED)	2
12	Andy Bishop (USA)	135
13	Rudy Dhaenens (BEL)	87
14	Gerrie Knetemann (NED)	AB-6
15	Jörg Müller (SUI)	27
16	Peter Stevenhaagen (NED)	29
17	Gert-Jan Theunisse (NED)	11
18	Adri van der Poel (NED)	84
19	Marc van Orsouw (NED)	76
Directeur sportif: Jan Gijsbers

Toshiba
No.	Rider	Pos.
21	Jean-François Bernard (FRA)	AB-15
22	Frédéric Garnier (FRA)	108
23	Martial Gayant (FRA)	71
24	Jacques Hanegraaf (NED)	119
25	Andreas Kappes (FRG)	110
26	Johan Lammerts (NED)	130
27	Philippe Leleu (FRA)	65
28	Marc Madiot (FRA)	66
29	Yvon Madiot (FRA)	AB-16
Directeur sportif: Yves Hézard

Système U
No.	Rider	Pos.
31	Laurent Fignon (FRA)	NP-12
32	Éric Boyer (FRA)	5
33	Jacques Decrion (FRA)	72
34	Dominique Garde (FRA)	93
35	Christophe Lavainne (FRA)	67
36	Thierry Marie (FRA)	98
37	Charly Mottet (FRA)	AB-15
38	Joël Pelier (FRA)	120
39	Pascal Simon (FRA)	17
Directeur sportif: Cyrille Guimard

Café de Colombia
No.	Rider	Pos.
41	Luis Herrera (COL)	6
42	Samuel Cabrera (COL)	31
43	Julio César Cadena (COL)	42
44	Henry Cárdenas (COL)	AB-4
45	Edgar Corredor (COL)	41
46	Israel Corredor (COL)	49
47	José Patrocinio Jiménez (COL)	51
48	Marco Antonio León (COL)	73
49	Martín Ramírez (COL)	NP-21
Directeur sportif: Rafael Antonio Niño

BH
No.	Rider	Pos.
51	Anselmo Fuerte (ESP)	AB-12
52	Francisco Antequera (ESP)	121
53	Philippe Bouvatier (FRA)	32
54	Laudelino Cubino Gonzalez (ESP)	13
55	Manuel Jorge Domínguez (ESP)	128
56	Federico Echave (ESP)	25
57	Javier Murguialday (ESP)	114
58	Jørgen Pedersen (DEN)	26
59	Álvaro Pino (ESP)	8
Directeur sportif: Javier Mínguez

7 Eleven–Hoonved
No.	Rider	Pos.
61	Andrew Hampsten (USA)	15
62	Raúl Alcalá (MEX)	20
63	Ron Kiefel (USA)	69
64	Roy Knickman (USA)	HD-18
65	Dag Otto Lauritzen (NOR)	34
66	Davis Phinney (USA)	105
67	Jeff Pierce (USA)	HD-19
68	Nathan Dahlberg (NZL)	144
69	Jens Veggerby (DEN)	113
Directeur sportif: Mike Neel

Caja Rural–Orbea
No.	Rider	Pos.
71	Marino Lejarreta (ESP)	16
72	René Beuker (NED)	AB-15
73	Roque de la Cruz (ESP)	104
74	Mathieu Hermans (NED)	147
75	Roland Le Clerc (FRA)	70
76	Jokin Mújika (ESP)	63
77	Erwin Nijboer (NED)	AB-15
78	Vicente Ridaura (ESP)	107
79	José Salvador Sanchis (ESP)	111
Directeur sportif: Domingo Perurena

Hitachi–Bosal–BCE
No.	Rider	Pos.
81	Claude Criquielion (BEL)	14
82	Bruno Bruyere (BEL)	NP-14
83	Dirk De Wolf (BEL)	80
84	Jos Haex (BEL)	56
85	Stefan Morjean (BEL)	101
86	Marc Sergeant (BEL)	33
87	Jean-Philippe Vandenbrande (BEL)	37
88	Wiebren Veenstra (NED)	NP-10
89	Jan Wijnants (BEL)	96
Directeur sportif: Albert De Kimpe

Chateau d'Ax
No.	Rider	Pos.
91	Gianni Bugno (ITA)	62
92	Roberto Amadio (ITA)	NP-16
93	Stefano Giuliani (ITA)	AB-12
94	Milan Jurčo (CSK)	139
95	Alessandro Pozzi (ITA)	79
96	Tony Rominger (SUI)	68
97	Valerio Tebaldi (ITA)	AB-19
98	Ennio Vanotti (ITA)	86
99	Stefano Zanatta (ITA)	142
Directeur sportif: Enzo Moser

Fagor
No.	Rider	Pos.
101	Robert Millar (GBR)	AB-18
102	Jean-Claude Bagot (FRA)	39
103	Charly Bérard (FRA)	40
104	Malcolm Elliott (GBR)	90
105	Pedro Muñoz (ESP)	AB-12
106	Bernard Richard (FRA)	AB-19
107	Eddy Schepers (BEL)	AB-12
108	Johnny Weltz (DEN)	54
109	Sean Yates (GBR)	59
Directeur sportif: Pierre Bazzo

Panasonic–Isostar
No.	Rider	Pos.
111	Erik Breukink (NED)	12
112	Theo de Rooij (NED)	AB-18
113	Henk Lubberding (NED)	AB-20
114	Guy Nulens (BEL)	38
115	John Talen (NED)	150
116	Eric Vanderaerden (BEL)	AB-12
117	Eric Van Lancker (BEL)	74
118	Teun van Vliet (NED)	NP-9
119	Peter Winnen (NED)	9
Directeur sportif: Peter Post

Z–Peugeot
No.	Rider	Pos.
121	Ronan Pensec (FRA)	7
122	Henri Abadie (FRA)	44
123	Frédéric Brun (FRA)	81
124	Philippe Casado (FRA)	129
125	Bruno Cornillet (FRA)	NP-11
126	Gilbert Duclos-Lassalle (FRA)	36
127	Atle Kvålsvoll (NOR)	NP-16
128	Denis Roux (FRA)	10
129	Jérôme Simon (FRA)	19
Directeur sportif: Roger Legeay

Teka
No.	Rider	Pos.
131	Reimund Dietzen (FRG)	83
132	Enrique Alberto Aja Cagigas (ESP)	64
133	Jesús Blanco Villar (ESP)	35
134	Ángel Camarillo Llorens (ESP)	116
135	Régis Clère (FRA)	94
136	Arsenio González (ESP)	97
137	Alfonso Gutiérrez (ESP)	HD-13
138	Carlos Hernández Bailo (ESP)	NP-16
139	Mariano Sánchez Martinez (ESP)	57
Directeur sportif: José Antonio González

KAS–Canal 10–Mavic
No.	Rider	Pos.
141	Sean Kelly (IRL)	46
142	Alfred Achermann (SUI)	125
143	Éric Caritoux (FRA)	18
144	Acácio da Silva (POR)	92
145	Martin Earley (IRL)	AB-17
146	Celestino Prieto (ESP)	117
147	Gilles Sanders (FRA)	AB-19
148	Jon Unzaga (ESP)	53
149	Guido Van Calster (BEL)	AB-11
Directeur sportif: Christian Rumeau

RMO–Liberia–Mavic
No.	Rider	Pos.
151	Patrice Esnault (FRA)	78
152	Michel Bibollet (FRA)	88
153	Hartmut Bölts (FRG)	140
154	Thierry Claveyrolat (FRA)	23
155	Jean-Claude Colotti (FRA)	55
156	Gilles Mas (FRA)	AB-19
157	Dante Rezze (FRA)	100
158	Régis Simon (FRA)	123
159	Michel Vermote (BEL)	133
Directeur sportif: Bernard Vallet

Superconfex–Yoko–Opel
No.	Rider	Pos.
161	Rolf Gölz (FRG)	91
162	Gert Jakobs (NED)	145
163	Frans Maassen (NED)	126
164	Jelle Nijdam (NED)	122
165	Ludo Peeters (BEL)	89
166	Twan Poels (NED)	127
167	Gerrit Solleveld (NED)	132
168	Jean-Paul van Poppel (NED)	138
169	Nico Verhoeven (NED)	143
Directeur sportif: Jan Raas

Reynolds
No.	Rider	Pos.
171	Pedro Delgado (ESP)	1
172	Dominique Arnaud (FRA)	48
173	Ángel Arroyo (ESP)	AB-15
174	Herminio Díaz Zabala (ESP)	118
175	Julián Gorospe (ESP)	60
176	Omar Hernández (COL)	AB-19
177	Miguel Induráin (ESP)	47
178	Luis Javier Lukin (ESP)	82
179	Jesús Rodríguez Magro (ESP)	52
Directeur sportif: José Miguel Echavarri

Kelme
No.	Rider	Pos.
181	Fabio Parra (COL)	3
182	Vicente Belda (ESP)	75
183	Eduardo Chozas (ESP)	30
184	Antonio Coll Pontanilla (ESP)	AB-5
185	Iñaki Gastón (ESP)	112
186	Ricardo Martínez (ESP)	AB-7
187	Juan Martínez Oliver (ESP)	134
188	José Recio (ESP)	AB-12
189	Jaime Vilamajó (ESP)	NP-6
Directeur sportif: Rafael Carrasco Guerra

Weinmann–La Suisse–SMM Uster
No.	Rider	Pos.
191	Niki Rüttimann (SUI)	43
192	Steve Bauer (CAN)	4
193	Jean-Claude Leclercq (FRA)	58
194	Pascal Richard (SUI)	AB-3
195	Gerard Veldscholten (NED)	45
196	Frédéric Vichot (FRA)	28
197	Michael Wilson (AUS)	50
198	Guido Winterberg (SUI)	NP-16
199	Gerhard Zadrobilek (AUT)	21
Directeur sportif: Paul Köchli

ADR–Mini Fiat–IOC
No.	Rider	Pos.
201	Dirk Demol (BEL)	149
202	Alfons De Wolf (BEL)	102
203	Frank Hoste (BEL)	124
204	Jaanus Kuum (NOR)	24
205	René Martens (BEL)	131
206	Johan Museeuw (BEL)	AB-18
207	Patrick Onnockx (BEL)	AB-18
208	Eddy Planckaert (BEL)	115
209	Dirk Wayenberg (BEL)	151
Directeur sportif: José De Cauwer

Sigma–Fina–Diamant
No.	Rider	Pos.
211	Hennie Kuiper (NED)	95
212	Etienne De Wilde (BEL)	103
213	Jean-Pierre Heynderickx (BEL)	148
214	Roger Ilegems (BEL)	HD-12
215	Søren Lilholt (DEN)	99
216	Jan Nevens (BEL)	61
217	Rik Van Slycke (BEL)	137
218	Willem Wijnant (BEL)	HD-12
219	Ludwig Wijnants (BEL)	HD-13
Directeur sportif: Willy Teirlinck

=== By nationality ===
The 198 riders that competed in the 1988 Tour de France represented 20 countries. Riders from ten countries won stages during the race; Netherlands riders won the largest number of stages.

Country	No. of riders	Finishers	Stage wins
Australia	1	1	
Austria	1	1	
Belgium	31	22	
Canada	1	1	1 (Steve Bauer)
Colombia	11	8	1 (Fabio Parra)
Czechoslovakia	1	1	
Denmark	4	4	1 (Johnny Weltz)
France	41	33	2 (Jérôme Simon, Thierry Marie)
Ireland	2	1	
Italy	14	11	4 (Guido Bontempi, Valerio Tebaldi, Massimo Ghirotto, Gianni Bugno)
Mexico	1	1	
Netherlands	27	20	7 (Jean-Paul van Poppel ×4, Jelle Nijdam, Steven Rooks, Adri van der Poel)
New Zealand	1	1	
Norway	3	2	
Portugal	1	1	1 (Acácio da Silva)
Spain	37	28	3 (Pedro Delgado, Laudelino Cubino, Juan Martínez Oliver)
Switzerland	8	5	
Great Britain	3	2	1 (Sean Yates)
United States	6	4	
West Germany	4	4	1 (Rolf Gölz)
Total	198	151	22 (Note: The team time trial on stage 2, won by Panasonic–Isostar, is not counted in this total.)
