= List of teams and cyclists in the 1986 Giro d'Italia =

The 1986 Giro d'Italia was the 69th edition of the Giro d'Italia, one of cycling's Grand Tours. The field consisted of 171 riders, and 143 riders finished the race.

== By rider ==
Legend
No.	Starting number worn by the rider during the Giro
Pos.	Position in the general classification
DNF	Denotes a rider who did not finish

No.	Name	Nationality	Team	Ref
1	Gianni Bugno	Italy	Atala–Ofmega	
2	Salvatore Cavallaro	Italy	Atala–Ofmega	
3	Per Christiansson	Sweden	Atala–Ofmega	
4	Urs Freuler	Switzerland	Atala–Ofmega	
5	Pierino Gavazzi	Italy	Atala–Ofmega	
6	Dante Morandi	Italy	Atala–Ofmega	
7	Ezio Moroni	Italy	Atala–Ofmega	
8	Mario Noris	Italy	Atala–Ofmega	
9	Emilio Ravasio	Italy	Atala–Ofmega	
11	Marino Amadori	Italy	Ecoflam–Jollyscarpe–BFB Bruciatori–Alfa Lum	
12	Daniele Caroli	Italy	Ecoflam–Jollyscarpe–BFB Bruciatori–Alfa Lum	
13	Franco Chioccioli	Italy	Ecoflam–Jollyscarpe–BFB Bruciatori–Alfa Lum	
14	Roberto Gaggioli	Italy	Ecoflam–Jollyscarpe–BFB Bruciatori–Alfa Lum	
15	Orlando Maini	Italy	Ecoflam–Jollyscarpe–BFB Bruciatori–Alfa Lum	
16	Filippo Piersanti	Italy	Ecoflam–Jollyscarpe–BFB Bruciatori–Alfa Lum	
17	Romano Randi	Italy	Ecoflam–Jollyscarpe–BFB Bruciatori–Alfa Lum	
18	Maurizio Rossi	Italy	Ecoflam–Jollyscarpe–BFB Bruciatori–Alfa Lum	
19	Michael Wilson	Australia	Ecoflam–Jollyscarpe–BFB Bruciatori–Alfa Lum	
21	Stephen Roche	Ireland	Carrera Jeans–Vagabond	
22	Roberto Visentini	Italy	Carrera Jeans–Vagabond	
23	Guido Bontempi	Italy	Carrera Jeans–Vagabond	
24	Bruno Leali	Italy	Carrera Jeans–Vagabond	
25	Davide Cassani	Italy	Carrera Jeans–Vagabond	
26	Eddy Schepers	Belgium	Carrera Jeans–Vagabond	
27	Jørgen Pedersen	Denmark	Carrera Jeans–Vagabond	
28	Fabio Bordonali	Italy	Carrera Jeans–Vagabond	
29	Massimo Ghirotto	Italy	Carrera Jeans–Vagabond	
31	Domenico Cavallo	Italy	Ariostea–Gres	
32	Piero Ghibaudo	Italy	Ariostea–Gres	
33	Kjell Nilsson	Sweden	Ariostea–Gres	
34	Dag Erik Pedersen	Norway	Ariostea–Gres	
35	Luca Rota	Italy	Ariostea–Gres	
36	Sergio Santimaria	Italy	Ariostea–Gres	
37	Patrick Serra	Sweden	Ariostea–Gres	
38	Maurizio Vandelli	Italy	Ariostea–Gres	
39	Alfio Vandi	Italy	Ariostea–Gres	
41	Giuseppe Saronni	Italy	Del Tongo	
42	Flavio Giupponi	Italy	Del Tongo	
43	Francesco Cesarini	Italy	Del Tongo	
44	Lech Piasecki	Poland	Del Tongo	
45	Maurizio Piovani	Italy	Del Tongo	
46	Luciano Loro	Italy	Del Tongo	
47	Czesław Lang	Poland	Del Tongo	
48	Roberto Ceruti	Italy	Del Tongo	
49	Silvestro Milani	Italy	Del Tongo	
51	Silvano Riccò	Italy	Dromedario–Fibok–Laminox	
52	Stefano Colagè	Italy	Dromedario–Fibok–Laminox	
53	Marco Franceschini	Italy	Dromedario–Fibok–Laminox	
54	Enrico Pochini	Italy	Dromedario–Fibok–Laminox	
55	Claudio Vandelli	Italy	Dromedario–Fibok–Laminox	
56	Giuseppe Montella	Italy	Dromedario–Fibok–Laminox	
57	Giancarlo Montedori	Italy	Dromedario–Fibok–Laminox	
58	Fausto Terreni	Italy	Dromedario–Fibok–Laminox	
59	Giuseppe Faraca	Italy	Dromedario–Fibok–Laminox	
61	Martín Ramírez	Colombia	Fagor	
62	Argemiro Bohórquez	Colombia	Fagor	
63	Pedro Muñoz	Spain	Fagor	
64	Frank Hoste	Belgium	Fagor	
65	Jean-René Bernaudeau	France	Fagor	
66	Pol Verschuere	Belgium	Fagor	
67	Pascal Chaubet	France	Fagor	
68	Henri Abadie	France	Fagor	
69	Martin Earley	Ireland	Fagor	
71	Gottfried Schmutz	Switzerland	Cilo–Aufina–Gemeaz Cusin	
72	Jean-Marie Grezet	Switzerland	Cilo–Aufina–Gemeaz Cusin	
73	Heinz Imboden	Switzerland	Cilo–Aufina–Gemeaz Cusin	
74	Rocco Cattaneo	Switzerland	Cilo–Aufina–Gemeaz Cusin	
75	Serge Demierre	Switzerland	Cilo–Aufina–Gemeaz Cusin	
76	Tony Rominger	Switzerland	Cilo–Aufina–Gemeaz Cusin	
77	Daniel Gisiger	Switzerland	Cilo–Aufina–Gemeaz Cusin	
78	Jürg Bruggmann	Switzerland	Cilo–Aufina–Gemeaz Cusin	
79	Marco Vitali	Italy	Cilo–Aufina–Gemeaz Cusin	
81	Adriano Baffi	Italy	Gis Gelati	
82	Silvano Contini	Italy	Gis Gelati	
83	Marco Giovannetti	Italy	Gis Gelati	
84	Palmiro Masciarelli	Italy	Gis Gelati	
85	Giuseppe Petito	Italy	Gis Gelati	
86	Alessandro Pozzi	Italy	Gis Gelati	
87	Marino Polini	Italy	Gis Gelati	
88	Ennio Salvador	Italy	Gis Gelati	
89	Ennio Vanotti	Italy	Gis Gelati	
91	Greg LeMond	United States	La Vie Claire	
92	Steve Bauer	Canada	La Vie Claire	
93	Charly Bérard	France	La Vie Claire	
94	Kim Eriksen	Denmark	La Vie Claire	
95	Frédéric Garnier	France	La Vie Claire	
96	Roy Knickman	United States	La Vie Claire	
97	Niki Rüttimann	Switzerland	La Vie Claire	
98	Alain Vigneron	France	La Vie Claire	
99	Christian Jourdan	France	La Vie Claire	
101	Daniele Asti	Italy	Magniflex–Centroscarpa	
102	Bruno Bulić	Yugoslavia	Magniflex–Centroscarpa	
103	Bruno Cenghialta	Italy	Magniflex–Centroscarpa	
104	Flavio Chesini	Italy	Magniflex–Centroscarpa	
105	Cesare Cipollini	Italy	Magniflex–Centroscarpa	
106	Enrico Galleschi	Italy	Magniflex–Centroscarpa	
107	Alessandro Giannelli	Italy	Magniflex–Centroscarpa	
108	Enrico Grimani	Italy	Magniflex–Centroscarpa	
109	Mauro-Antonio Santaromita	Italy	Magniflex–Centroscarpa	
111	Stefano Allocchio	Italy	Malvor–Bottecchia–Vaporella	
112	Mario Beccia	Italy	Malvor–Bottecchia–Vaporella	
113	Pierangelo Bincoletto	Italy	Malvor–Bottecchia–Vaporella	
114	Mauro Longo	Italy	Malvor–Bottecchia–Vaporella	
115	Roberto Pagnin	Italy	Malvor–Bottecchia–Vaporella	
116	Renato Piccolo	Italy	Malvor–Bottecchia–Vaporella	
117	Stefano Zanatta	Italy	Malvor–Bottecchia–Vaporella	
118	Primož Čerin	Yugoslavia	Malvor–Bottecchia–Vaporella	
119	Acácio da Silva	Portugal	Malvor–Bottecchia–Vaporella	
121	Stefano Bizzoni	Italy	Murella–Fanini	
122	Gregor Braun	West Germany	Murella–Fanini	
123	Daniele Del Ben	Italy	Murella–Fanini	
124	Walter Delle Case	Italy	Murella–Fanini	
125	Giuseppe Franzoni	Italy	Murella–Fanini	
126	Raniero Gradi	Italy	Murella–Fanini	
127	Fabio Patuelli	Italy	Murella–Fanini	
128	Rolf Sørensen	Denmark	Murella–Fanini	
129	Marco Tabai	Italy	Murella–Fanini	
131	Erik Breukink	Netherlands	Panasonic–Merckx–Agu	
132	Ludo De Keulenaer	Belgium	Panasonic–Merckx–Agu	
133	Eric Van Lancker	Belgium	Panasonic–Merckx–Agu	
134	Henk Lubberding	Netherlands	Panasonic–Merckx–Agu	
135	Allan Peiper	Australia	Panasonic–Merckx–Agu	
136	Ludo Giesberts	Belgium	Panasonic–Merckx–Agu	
137	Eric Vanderaerden	Belgium	Panasonic–Merckx–Agu	
138	Johan van der Velde	Netherlands	Panasonic–Merckx–Agu	
139	Teun van Vliet	Netherlands	Panasonic–Merckx–Agu	
141	Fulvio Bertacco	Italy	Sammontana–Bianchi	
142	Tullio Cortinovis	Italy	Sammontana–Bianchi	
143	Dario Mariuzzo	Italy	Sammontana–Bianchi	
144	Alessandro Paganessi	Italy	Sammontana–Bianchi	
145	Valerio Piva	Italy	Sammontana–Bianchi	
146	Tommy Prim	Sweden	Sammontana–Bianchi	
147	Giovanni Renosto	Italy	Sammontana–Bianchi	
148	Paolo Rosola	Italy	Sammontana–Bianchi	
149	Alberto Volpi	Italy	Sammontana–Bianchi	
151	Jesper Worre	Denmark	Santini	
152	Brian Petersen	Denmark	Santini	
153	Neil Stephens	Australia	Santini	
154	Maurizio Conti	Italy	Santini	
155	Elio Festa	Italy	Santini	
156	Fabrizio Vannucci	Italy	Santini	
157	Benedetto Patellaro	Italy	Santini	
158	Patrizio Gambirasio	Italy	Santini	
159	Mauro Angelucci	Italy	Santini	
161	Hennie Kuiper	Netherlands	Skala–Skil–Gazelle	
162	Alfons De Wolf	Belgium	Skala–Skil–Gazelle	
163	Jean-Paul van Poppel	Netherlands	Skala–Skil–Gazelle	
164	Nico Verhoeven	Netherlands	Skala–Skil–Gazelle	
165	Adri van Houwelingen	Netherlands	Skala–Skil–Gazelle	
166	Gert Jakobs	Netherlands	Skala–Skil–Gazelle	
167	Jean Habets	Netherlands	Skala–Skil–Gazelle	
168	Jacques van der Poel	Netherlands	Skala–Skil–Gazelle	
169	Jacques van Meer	Netherlands	Skala–Skil–Gazelle	
171	Francesco Moser	Italy	Supermercati Brianzoli	
172	Gianbattista Baronchelli	Italy	Supermercati Brianzoli	
173	Claudio Corti	Italy	Supermercati Brianzoli	
174	Dietrich Thurau	West Germany	Supermercati Brianzoli	
175	Gerhard Zadrobilek	Austria	Supermercati Brianzoli	
176	Giovanni Bottoia	Italy	Supermercati Brianzoli	
177	Antonio Bevilacqua	Italy	Supermercati Brianzoli	
178	Stefano Giuliani	Italy	Supermercati Brianzoli	
179	Gianni Zola	Italy	Supermercati Brianzoli	
181	Emanuele Bombini	Italy	Vini Ricordi–Pinarello–Sidermec	
182	Federico Ghiotto	Italy	Vini Ricordi–Pinarello–Sidermec	
183	Johan Lammerts	Netherlands	Vini Ricordi–Pinarello–Sidermec	
184	Riccardo Magrini	Italy	Vini Ricordi–Pinarello–Sidermec	
185	Giovanni Mantovani	Italy	Vini Ricordi–Pinarello–Sidermec	
186	Yuri Naldi	Italy	Vini Ricordi–Pinarello–Sidermec	
187	Luciano Rabottini	Italy	Vini Ricordi–Pinarello–Sidermec	
188	Claudio Savini	Italy	Vini Ricordi–Pinarello–Sidermec	
189	Jens Veggerby	Denmark	Vini Ricordi–Pinarello–Sidermec	
