= 1986 Giro d'Italia, Prologue to Stage 11 =

Cycling race stages

The 1986 Giro d'Italia was the 69th edition of the Giro d'Italia, one of cycling's Grand Tours. The Giro began in Palermo, with a prologue individual time trial on 12 May, and Stage 11 occurred on 22 May with a stage to Castiglione del Lago. The race finished in Merano on 2 June.

== Prologue ==
12 May 1986 — Palermo, 1 km (0.62 mi) (ITT)

Prologue result and general classification after Prologue

Rank	Rider	Team	Time
1	Urs Freuler (SUI)	Atala–Ofmega	1' 08"
2	Giuseppe Saronni (ITA)	Del Tongo	+ 1"
3	Silvestro Milani (ITA)	Del Tongo	+ 2"
4	Guido Bontempi (ITA)	Carrera Jeans–Vagabond	s.t.
5	Francesco Moser (ITA)	Supermercati Brianzoli	s.t.
6	Allan Peiper (AUS)	Panasonic–Merckx–Agu	+ 3"
7	Stefano Allocchio (ITA)	Malvor–Bottecchia–Vaporella	s.t.
8	Enrico Grimani (ITA)	Magniflex–Centroscarpa	s.t.
9	Eric Vanderaerden (BEL)	Panasonic–Merckx–Agu	s.t.
10	Francesco Cesarini (ITA)	Del Tongo	s.t.

== Stage 1 ==
12 May 1986 — Palermo to Sciacca, 140 km (87 mi)

Stage 1 result

Rank	Rider	Team	Time
1	Sergio Santimaria (ITA)	Ariostea–Gres	3h 34' 03"
2	Paolo Rosola (ITA)	Sammontana–Bianchi	+ 1' 28"
3	Guido Bontempi (ITA)	Carrera Jeans–Vagabond	s.t.
4	Johan van der Velde (NED)	Panasonic–Merckx–Agu	s.t.
5	Dag Erik Pedersen (NOR)	Ariostea–Gres	s.t.
6	Domenico Cavallo (ITA)	Ariostea–Gres	s.t.
7	Johan Lammerts (NED)	Vini Ricordi–Pinarello–Sidermec	s.t.
8	Stefano Allocchio (ITA)	Malvor–Bottecchia–Vaporella	s.t.
9	Jean-Paul van Poppel (NED)	Skala–Skil–Gazelle	s.t.
10	Frank Hoste (BEL)	Fagor	s.t.

General classification after Stage 1

Rank	Rider	Team	Time
1	Sergio Santimaria (ITA)	Ariostea–Gres	3h 35' 33"
2	Paolo Rosola (ITA)	Sammontana–Bianchi	+ 2"
3	Guido Bontempi (ITA)	Carrera Jeans–Vagabond	+ 3"
4	Urs Freuler (SUI)	Atala–Ofmega	+ 11"
5	Giuseppe Saronni (ITA)	Del Tongo	+ 12"
6	Francesco Moser (ITA)	Supermercati Brianzoli	+ 13"
7	Stefano Allocchio (ITA)	Malvor–Bottecchia–Vaporella	+ 14"
8	Roberto Gaggioli (ITA)	Ecoflam–Jollyscarpe–BFB Bruciatori–Alfa Lum	s.t.
9	Allan Peiper (AUS)	Panasonic–Merckx–Agu	s.t.
10	Enrico Grimani (ITA)	Magniflex–Centroscarpa	s.t.

== Stage 2 ==
13 May 1986 — Sciacca to Catania, 259 km (161 mi)

Stage 2 result

Rank	Rider	Team	Time
1	Jean-Paul van Poppel (NED)	Skala–Skil–Gazelle	3h 56' 20"
2	Eric Vanderaerden (BEL)	Panasonic–Merckx–Agu	s.t.
3	Urs Freuler (SUI)	Atala–Ofmega	s.t.
4	Stefano Allocchio (ITA)	Malvor–Bottecchia–Vaporella	s.t.
5	Johan van der Velde (NED)	Panasonic–Merckx–Agu	s.t.
6	Flavio Chesini (ITA)	Magniflex–Centroscarpa	s.t.
7	Giovanni Mantovani (ITA)	Vini Ricordi–Pinarello–Sidermec	s.t.
8	Giuseppe Petito (ITA)	Gis Gelati	s.t.
9	Daniele Caroli (ITA)	Ecoflam–Jollyscarpe–BFB Bruciatori–Alfa Lum	s.t.
10	Adriano Baffi (ITA)	Gis Gelati	s.t.

General classification after Stage 2

Rank	Rider	Team	Time
1	Jean-Paul van Poppel (NED)	Skala–Skil–Gazelle	10h 31' 50"
2	Sergio Santimaria (ITA)	Ariostea–Gres	+ 3"
3	Urs Freuler (SUI)	Atala–Ofmega	+ 4"
4	Paolo Rosola (ITA)	Sammontana–Bianchi	+ 5"
5	Guido Bontempi (ITA)	Carrera Jeans–Vagabond	+ 6"
6	Stefano Allocchio (ITA)	Malvor–Bottecchia–Vaporella	+ 12"
7	Giuseppe Saronni (ITA)	Del Tongo	+ 15"
8	Francesco Moser (ITA)	Supermercati Brianzoli	+ 16"
9	Roberto Gaggioli (ITA)	Ecoflam–Jollyscarpe–BFB Bruciatori–Alfa Lum	+ 17"
10	Enrico Grimani (ITA)	Magniflex–Centroscarpa	s.t.

== Stage 3 ==
14 May 1986 — Catania to Taormina, 50 km (31 mi) (TTT)

Stage 3 result

Rank	Team	Time
1	Del Tongo	1h 04' 51"
2	Supermercati Brianzoli	+ 9"
3	La Vie Claire	+ 1' 41"
4	Carrera Jeans–Vagabond	+ 2' 02"
5	Ecoflam–Jollyscarpe–BFB Bruciatori–Alfa Lum	+ 2' 06"
6	Vini Ricordi–Pinarello–Sidermec	+ 2' 32"
7	Sammontana–Bianchi	+ 2' 38"
8	Malvor–Bottecchia–Vaporella	+ 2' 46"
9	Gis Gelati	s.t.
10	Panasonic–Merckx–Agu	+ 2' 47"

General classification after Stage 3

Rank	Rider	Team	Time
1	Giuseppe Saronni (ITA)	Del Tongo	11h 36' 56"
2	Francesco Moser (ITA)	Supermercati Brianzoli	+ 10"
3	Dietrich Thurau (FRG)	Supermercati Brianzoli	+ 12"
4	Claudio Corti (ITA)	Supermercati Brianzoli	+ 14"
5	Gianbattista Baronchelli (ITA)	Supermercati Brianzoli	+ 16"
6	Gerhard Zadrobilek (AUT)	Supermercati Brianzoli	+ 17"
7	Flavio Giupponi (ITA)	Del Tongo	+ 33"
8	Antonio Bevilacqua (ITA)	Supermercati Brianzoli	+ 40"
9	Luciano Loro (ITA)	Del Tongo	+ 57"
10	Steve Bauer (CAN)	La Vie Claire	+ 1' 44"

== Stage 4 ==
15 May 1986 — Villa San Giovanni to Nicotera, 115 km (71 mi)

Stage 4 result

Rank	Rider	Team	Time
1	Gianbattista Baronchelli (ITA)	Supermercati Brianzoli	2h 53' 38"
2	Francesco Moser (ITA)	Supermercati Brianzoli	+ 18"
3	Alberto Volpi (ITA)	Sammontana–Bianchi	s.t.
4	Stefano Colagè (ITA)	Dromedario–Fibok–Laminox	s.t.
5	Johan van der Velde (NED)	Panasonic–Merckx–Agu	s.t.
6	Sergio Santimaria (ITA)	Ariostea–Gres	s.t.
7	Niki Rüttimann (SWI)	La Vie Claire	s.t.
8	Pedro Muñoz (ESP)	Fagor	s.t.
9	Michael Wilson (AUS)	Ecoflam–Jollyscarpe–BFB Bruciatori–Alfa Lum	s.t.
10	Gianni Bugno (ITA)	Atala–Ofmega	s.t.

General classification after Stage 4

Rank	Rider	Team	Time
1	Gianbattista Baronchelli (ITA)	Supermercati Brianzoli	14h 30' 30"
2	Francesco Moser (ITA)	Supermercati Brianzoli	+ 17"
3	Giuseppe Saronni (ITA)	Del Tongo	+ 22"
4	Dietrich Thurau (FRG)	Supermercati Brianzoli	+ 34"
5	Claudio Corti (ITA)	Supermercati Brianzoli	+ 36"
6	Gerhard Zadrobilek (AUT)	Supermercati Brianzoli	+ 39"
7	Flavio Giupponi (ITA)	Del Tongo	+ 55"
8	Antonio Bevilacqua (ITA)	Supermercati Brianzoli	+ 1' 02"
9	Luciano Loro (ITA)	Del Tongo	+ 1' 19"
10	Steve Bauer (CAN)	La Vie Claire	+ 2' 06"

== Stage 5 ==
16 May 1986 — Nicotera to Cosenza, 194 km (121 mi)

Stage 5 result

Rank	Rider	Team	Time
1	Greg LeMond (USA)	La Vie Claire	5h 14' 55"
2	Giuseppe Saronni (ITA)	Del Tongo	+ 2"
3	Massimo Ghirotto (ITA)	Carrera Jeans–Vagabond	s.t.
4	Stefano Colagè (ITA)	Dromedario–Fibok–Laminox	s.t.
5	Franco Chioccioli (ITA)	Ecoflam–Jollyscarpe–BFB Bruciatori–Alfa Lum	s.t.
6	Steve Bauer (CAN)	La Vie Claire	s.t.
7	Alberto Volpi (ITA)	Sammontana–Bianchi	s.t.
8	Emanuele Bombini (ITA)	Vini Ricordi–Pinarello–Sidermec	s.t.
9	Michael Wilson (AUS)	Ecoflam–Jollyscarpe–BFB Bruciatori–Alfa Lum	s.t.
10	Gianni Bugno (ITA)	Atala–Ofmega	s.t.

General classification after Stage 5

Rank	Rider	Team	Time
1	Gianbattista Baronchelli (ITA)	Supermercati Brianzoli	19h 45' 27"
2	Giuseppe Saronni (ITA)	Del Tongo	+ 7"
3	Flavio Giupponi (ITA)	Del Tongo	+ 55"
4	Luciano Loro (ITA)	Del Tongo	+ 1' 19"
5	Francesco Moser (ITA)	Supermercati Brianzoli	+ 1' 42"
6	Claudio Corti (ITA)	Supermercati Brianzoli	+ 2' 01"
7	Steve Bauer (CAN)	La Vie Claire	+ 2' 06"
8	Niki Rüttimann (SWI)	La Vie Claire	+ 2' 07"
9	Roberto Visentini (ITA)	Carrera Jeans–Vagabond	+ 2' 29"
10	Franco Chioccioli (ITA)	Ecoflam–Jollyscarpe–BFB Bruciatori–Alfa Lum	+ 2' 32"

== Stage 6 ==
17 May 1986 — Cosenza to Potenza, 251 km (156 mi)

Stage 6 result

Rank	Rider	Team	Time
1	Roberto Visentini (ITA)	Carrera Jeans–Vagabond	6h 50' 03"
2	Giuseppe Saronni (ITA)	Del Tongo	+ 11"
3	Michael Wilson (AUS)	Ecoflam–Jollyscarpe–BFB Bruciatori–Alfa Lum	s.t.
4	Jean-Paul van Poppel (NED)	Skala–Skil–Gazelle	+ 5"
5	Paolo Rosola (ITA)	Sammontana–Bianchi	s.t.
6	Steve Bauer (CAN)	La Vie Claire	s.t.
7	Frédéric Garnier (FRA)	La Vie Claire	s.t.
8	Stefano Colagè (ITA)	Dromedario–Fibok–Laminox	s.t.
9	Jesper Worre (DEN)	Santini	s.t.
10	Dag Erik Pedersen (NOR)	Ariostea–Gres	s.t.

General classification after Stage 6

Rank	Rider	Team	Time
1	Giuseppe Saronni (ITA)	Del Tongo	26h 35' 33"
2	Gianbattista Baronchelli (ITA)	Supermercati Brianzoli	+ 8"
3	Flavio Giupponi (ITA)	Del Tongo	+ 1' 03"
4	Luciano Loro (ITA)	Del Tongo	+ 1' 27"
5	Francesco Moser (ITA)	Supermercati Brianzoli	+ 1' 50"
6	Roberto Visentini (ITA)	Carrera Jeans–Vagabond	+ 2' 06"
7	Claudio Corti (ITA)	Supermercati Brianzoli	+ 2' 09"
8	Steve Bauer (CAN)	La Vie Claire	+ 2' 14"
9	Niki Rüttimann (SWI)	La Vie Claire	+ 2' 15"
10	Michael Wilson (AUS)	Ecoflam–Jollyscarpe–BFB Bruciatori–Alfa Lum	+ 2' 31"

== Stage 7 ==
18 May 1986 — Potenza to Baia Domizia, 257 km (160 mi)

Stage 7 result

Rank	Rider	Team	Time
1	Guido Bontempi (ITA)	Carrera Jeans–Vagabond	6h 39' 37"
2	Stefano Allocchio (ITA)	Malvor–Bottecchia–Vaporella	s.t.
3	Paolo Rosola (ITA)	Sammontana–Bianchi	s.t.
4	Flavio Chesini (ITA)	Magniflex–Centroscarpa	s.t.
5	Giovanni Mantovani (ITA)	Vini Ricordi–Pinarello–Sidermec	s.t.
6	Daniele Asti (ITA)	Magniflex–Centroscarpa	s.t.
7	Jean-Paul van Poppel (NED)	Skala–Skil–Gazelle	s.t.
8	Johan van der Velde (NED)	Panasonic–Merckx–Agu	s.t.
9	Eric Vanderaerden (BEL)	Panasonic–Merckx–Agu	s.t.
10	Domenico Cavallo (ITA)	Ariostea–Gres	s.t.

General classification after Stage 7

Rank	Rider	Team	Time
1	Giuseppe Saronni (ITA)	Del Tongo	33h 15' 10"
2	Gianbattista Baronchelli (ITA)	Supermercati Brianzoli	+ 8"
3	Flavio Giupponi (ITA)	Del Tongo	+ 1' 03"
4	Luciano Loro (ITA)	Del Tongo	+ 1' 27"
5	Francesco Moser (ITA)	Supermercati Brianzoli	+ 1' 50"
6	Roberto Visentini (ITA)	Carrera Jeans–Vagabond	+ 2' 06"
7	Claudio Corti (ITA)	Supermercati Brianzoli	+ 2' 09"
8	Steve Bauer (CAN)	La Vie Claire	+ 2' 14"
9	Niki Rüttimann (SWI)	La Vie Claire	+ 2' 15"
10	Michael Wilson (AUS)	Ecoflam–Jollyscarpe–BFB Bruciatori–Alfa Lum	+ 2' 31"

== Stage 8 ==
19 May 1986 — Cellole to Avezzano, 160 km (99 mi)

Stage 8 result

Rank	Rider	Team	Time
1	Franco Chioccioli (ITA)	Ecoflam–Jollyscarpe–BFB Bruciatori–Alfa Lum	4h 13' 00"
2	Stefano Colagè (ITA)	Dromedario–Fibok–Laminox	s.t.
3	Niki Rüttimann (SWI)	La Vie Claire	s.t.
4	Alfio Vandi (ITA)	Ariostea–Gres	s.t.
5	Stefano Giuliani (ITA)	Supermercati Brianzoli	s.t.
6	Heinz Imboden (SUI)	Cilo–Aufina–Gemeaz Cusin	s.t.
7	Bruno Leali (ITA)	Carrera Jeans–Vagabond	s.t.
8	Roberto Visentini (ITA)	Carrera Jeans–Vagabond	s.t.
9	Alessandro Pozzi (ITA)	Gis Gelati	+ 3"
10	Claudio Vandelli (ITA)	Dromedario–Fibok–Laminox	s.t.

General classification after Stage 8

Rank	Rider	Team	Time
1	Giuseppe Saronni (ITA)	Del Tongo	37h 28' 17"
2	Gianbattista Baronchelli (ITA)	Supermercati Brianzoli	+ 8"
3	Flavio Giupponi (ITA)	Del Tongo	+ 1' 03"
4	Luciano Loro (ITA)	Del Tongo	+ 1' 27"
5	Francesco Moser (ITA)	Supermercati Brianzoli	+ 1' 50"
6	Niki Rüttimann (SWI)	La Vie Claire	+ 1' 58"
7	Roberto Visentini (ITA)	Carrera Jeans–Vagabond	+ 1' 59"
8	Claudio Corti (ITA)	Supermercati Brianzoli	+ 2' 09"
9	Franco Chioccioli (ITA)	Ecoflam–Jollyscarpe–BFB Bruciatori–Alfa Lum	+ 2' 13"
10	Steve Bauer (CAN)	La Vie Claire	+ 2' 14"

== Stage 9 ==
20 May 1986 — Avezzano to Rieti, 172 km (107 mi)

Stage 9 result

Rank	Rider	Team	Time
1	Acácio da Silva (POR)	Malvor–Bottecchia–Vaporella	4h 48' 08"
2	Alfio Vandi (ITA)	Ariostea–Gres	s.t.
3	Marco Giovannetti (ITA)	Gis Gelati	s.t.
4	Greg LeMond (USA)	La Vie Claire	+ 1' 33"
5	Massimo Ghirotto (ITA)	Carrera Jeans–Vagabond	s.t.
6	Johan van der Velde (NED)	Panasonic–Merckx–Agu	s.t.
7	Stefano Colagè (ITA)	Dromedario–Fibok–Laminox	s.t.
8	Marco Vitali (ITA)	Cilo–Aufina–Gemeaz Cusin	s.t.
9	Francesco Moser (ITA)	Supermercati Brianzoli	s.t.
10	Ennio Salvador (ITA)	Gis Gelati	s.t.

General classification after Stage 9

Rank	Rider	Team	Time
1	Giuseppe Saronni (ITA)	Del Tongo	42h 17' 58"
2	Gianbattista Baronchelli (ITA)	Supermercati Brianzoli	+ 8"
3	Flavio Giupponi (ITA)	Del Tongo	+ 1' 03"
4	Acácio da Silva (POR)	Malvor–Bottecchia–Vaporella	+ 1' 27"
5	Luciano Loro (ITA)	Del Tongo	s.t.
6	Alfio Vandi (ITA)	Ariostea–Gres	+ 1' 48"
7	Francesco Moser (ITA)	Supermercati Brianzoli	+ 1' 50"
8	Niki Rüttimann (SWI)	La Vie Claire	+ 1' 58"
9	Roberto Visentini (ITA)	Carrera Jeans–Vagabond	+ 1' 59"
10	Marco Giovannetti (ITA)	Gis Gelati	+ 2' 06"

== Stage 10 ==
21 May 1986 — Rieti to Pesaro, 235 km (146 mi)

Stage 10 result

Rank	Rider	Team	Time
1	Guido Bontempi (ITA)	Carrera Jeans–Vagabond	5h 32' 37"
2	Stefano Allocchio (ITA)	Malvor–Bottecchia–Vaporella	s.t.
3	Daniele Asti (ITA)	Magniflex–Centroscarpa	s.t.
4	Frank Hoste (BEL)	Fagor	s.t.
5	Flavio Chesini (ITA)	Magniflex–Centroscarpa	s.t.
6	Rolf Sørensen (DEN)	Murella–Fanini	s.t.
7	Daniele Caroli (ITA)	Ecoflam–Jollyscarpe–BFB Bruciatori–Alfa Lum	s.t.
8	Patrizio Gambirasio (ITA)	Santini	s.t.
9	Urs Freuler (SUI)	Atala–Ofmega	s.t.
10	Eric Vanderaerden (BEL)	Panasonic–Merckx–Agu	s.t.

General classification after Stage 10

Rank	Rider	Team	Time
1	Giuseppe Saronni (ITA)	Del Tongo	47h 50' 35"
2	Gianbattista Baronchelli (ITA)	Supermercati Brianzoli	+ 8"
3	Flavio Giupponi (ITA)	Del Tongo	+ 1' 03"
4	Acácio da Silva (POR)	Malvor–Bottecchia–Vaporella	+ 1' 27"
5	Luciano Loro (ITA)	Del Tongo	s.t.
6	Alfio Vandi (ITA)	Ariostea–Gres	+ 1' 48"
7	Francesco Moser (ITA)	Supermercati Brianzoli	+ 1' 50"
8	Niki Rüttimann (SWI)	La Vie Claire	+ 1' 58"
9	Roberto Visentini (ITA)	Carrera Jeans–Vagabond	+ 1' 59"
10	Marco Giovannetti (ITA)	Gis Gelati	+ 2' 07"

== Stage 11 ==
22 May 1986 — Pesaro to Castiglione del Lago, 207 km (129 mi)

Stage 11 result

Rank	Rider	Team	Time
1	Guido Bontempi (ITA)	Carrera Jeans–Vagabond	5h 32' 40"
2	Johan van der Velde (NED)	Panasonic–Merckx–Agu	s.t.
3	Paolo Rosola (ITA)	Sammontana–Bianchi	s.t.
4	Silvano Riccò (ITA)	Dromedario–Fibok–Laminox	s.t.
5	Teun van Vliet (NED)	Panasonic–Merckx–Agu	s.t.
6	Stefano Colagè (ITA)	Dromedario–Fibok–Laminox	s.t.
7	Greg LeMond (USA)	La Vie Claire	s.t.
8	Patrick Serra (SWE)	Ariostea–Gres	s.t.
9	Roberto Pagnin (ITA)	Malvor–Bottecchia–Vaporella	s.t.
10	Jens Veggerby (DEN)	Vini Ricordi–Pinarello–Sidermec	s.t.

General classification after Stage 11

Rank	Rider	Team	Time
1	Giuseppe Saronni (ITA)	Del Tongo	53h 23' 15"
2	Gianbattista Baronchelli (ITA)	Supermercati Brianzoli	+ 8"
3	Flavio Giupponi (ITA)	Del Tongo	+ 1' 03"
4	Acácio da Silva (POR)	Malvor–Bottecchia–Vaporella	+ 1' 27"
5	Luciano Loro (ITA)	Del Tongo	s.t.
6	Alfio Vandi (ITA)	Ariostea–Gres	+ 1' 48"
7	Francesco Moser (ITA)	Supermercati Brianzoli	+ 1' 50"
8	Niki Rüttimann (SWI)	La Vie Claire	+ 1' 58"
9	Roberto Visentini (ITA)	Carrera Jeans–Vagabond	+ 1' 59"
10	Marco Giovannetti (ITA)	Gis Gelati	+ 2' 07"
