= 1989 Clásica de San Sebastián =

1989 UCI Road World Cup, race 8 of 12

Race details
- Dates: 12 August 1989
- Stages: 1
- Distance: 244 km (151.6 mi)
- Winning time: 6h 24' 10"

Results
	Winner	Gerhard Zadrobilek (AUT)	(7-Eleven)
	Second	Francisco Antequera (ESP)	(BH)
	Third	Tony Rominger (SUI)	(Chateau d'Ax)

The 1989 Clásica de San Sebastián was the 9th edition of the Clásica de San Sebastián cycle race and was held on 12 August 1989. The race started and finished in San Sebastián. The race was won by Gerhard Zadrobilek of the 7-Eleven team.

== General classification ==
Final general classification

Rank	Rider	Team	Time
1	Gerhard Zadrobilek (AUT)	7-Eleven	6h 24' 10"
2	Francisco Antequera (ESP)	BH	+ 2' 05"
3	Tony Rominger (SUI)	Chateau d'Ax	+ 2' 05"
4	Charly Mottet (FRA)	RMO	+ 2' 09"
5	Jesús Rodríguez Magro (ESP)	Reynolds	+ 2' 09"
6	Jean-Claude Leclercq (FRA)	Helvetia–La Suisse	+ 2' 09"
7	Gert-Jan Theunisse (NED)	PDM–Ultima–Concorde	+ 2' 09"
8	Andrew Hampsten (USA)	7-Eleven	+ 2' 09"
9	Juan Tomás Martínez (ESP)	Lotus–Zahor	+ 2' 09"
10	Julián Gorospe (ESP)	Reynolds	+ 2' 09"
