= 1986 Ronde van Nederland =

Dutch cycling race

These are the results for the 26th edition of the Ronde van Nederland cycling race, which was held from August 18 to August 23, 1986. The race started in Veenendaal (Gelderland) and finished in Gulpen (Limburg).

== Final classification ==
| RANK | NAME CYCLIST | TEAM | TIME |
|---|---|---|---|
| 1. | Gerrie Knetemann (NED) | PDM–Ultima–Concorde | 26:46:16 |
| 2. | Gerrit Solleveld (NED) | Kwantum–Decosol–Yoko | + 0.09 |
| 3. | Peter Pieters (NED) | Skala–Skil | + 0.27 |
| 4. | Johan Lammerts (NED) | Vini Ricordi–Pinarello–Sidermec | + 0.28 |
| 5. | Gert-Jan Theunisse (NED) | Panasonic–Merckx–Agu | + 1.07 |
| 6. | Johan van der Velde (NED) | Panasonic–Merckx–Agu | + 1.44 |
| 7. | Patrick Verschueren (BEL) | Roland–Van de Ven | + 1.56 |
| 8. | Gert Jakobs (NED) | Skala–Skil | + 3.08 |
| 9. | Twan Poels (NED) | Kwantum–Decosol–Yoko | + 4.05 |
| 10. | Henk Boeve (NED) | PDM–Ultima–Concorde | + 4.25 |
