= Draijer =

Surname list

Draijer is a surname. Notable people with the surname include:

- Dave Draijer (born 1973), Dutch baseball player
- Wiebe Draijer (born 1965), Dutch engineer, civil servant, and management consultant

== See also ==
- Johannes Draaijer (1963–1990), Dutch cyclist
