= Tabai =

Tabai may refer to:

- Tabaí, a town in Brazil
- Tabai (Caria), a town of ancient Caria, now in Turkey
- Ieremia Tabai, politician from Kiribati
- Marco Tabai, Italian cyclist
- Francesco Tabai, Italian long jumper
