= 1986 E3 Prijs Vlaanderen =

1986 E3 Harelbeke
Race details
- Dates: 22 March 1986
- Stages: 1
- Distance: 225 km (140 mi)
- Winning time: 5h 50' 00"

Results
	Winner	Eric Vanderaerden (BEL)	(Panasonic–Merckx–Agu)
	Second	Frits Pirard (NED)	(Skala–Skil)
	Third	Jos Lammertink (NED)	(Panasonic–Merckx–Agu)

The 1986 E3 Harelbeke was the 29th edition of the E3 Harelbeke cycle race and was held on 22 March 1986. The race started and finished in Harelbeke. The race was won by Eric Vanderaerden of the Panasonic team.

== General classification ==
Final general classification

Rank	Rider	Team	Time
1	Eric Vanderaerden (BEL)	Panasonic–Merckx–Agu	5h 50' 00"
2	Frits Pirard (NED)	Skala–Skil	+ 0"
3	Jos Lammertink (NED)	Panasonic–Merckx–Agu	+ 0"
4	Patrick Versluys (BEL)	Fangio–Lois	+ 2' 35"
5	Gerrit Solleveld (NED)	Kwantum–Decosol–Yoko	+ 2' 35"
6	Carlo Bomans (BEL)	Lotto–Emerxil–Merckx	+ 2' 35"
7	Yvan Lamote (BEL)	Hitachi–Marc	+ 3' 26"
8	Werner Devos (BEL)	Roland–Van de Ven	+ 3' 26"
9	Henk Lubberding (NED)	Panasonic–Merckx–Agu	+ 3' 26"
10	Hennie Kuiper (NED)	Skala–Skil	+ 3' 26"
