= 1989 Wincanton Classic =

Road cycling race

1989 UCI Road World Cup

Race details
- Dates: 30 July 1989
- Stages: 1
- Distance: 236.5 km (147.0 mi)
- Winning time: 5h 59' 21"

Results
	Winner	Frans Maassen (NED)	(Superconfex–Yoko–Opel–Colnago)
	Second	Maurizio Fondriest (ITA)	(Del Tongo)
	Third	Sean Kelly (IRE)	(PDM–Ultima–Concorde)

The 1990 Wincanton Classic was the 1st edition of the Wincanton Classic cycle race (also known as Leeds International Classic and Rochester International Classic) and was held on 30 July. The race took place in and around Newcastle. The race was won by Frans Maassen of the Superconfex–Yoko–Opel–Colnago team.

== Results ==
	Rider	Team	Time
1	Frans Maassen (NED)	Superconfex–Yoko–Opel–Colnago	5h 59' 21"
2	Maurizio Fondriest (ITA)	Del Tongo	+ 2"
3	Sean Kelly (IRL)	PDM–Ultima–Concorde	s.t.
4	Etienne De Wilde (BEL)	Histor–Sigma	s.t.
5	Teun van Vliet (NED)	Panasonic–Isostar–Colnago–Agu	s.t.
6	Paolo Rosola (ITA)	Gewiss–Bianchi	s.t.
7	Herman Frison (BEL)	Histor–Sigma	s.t.
8	Bruno Cornillet (FRA)	Z–Peugeot	s.t.
9	Sammie Moreels (BEL)	Lotto–Vlaanderen–Jong–Mbk–Merckx	s.t.
10	Stephan Joho (SUI)	Ariostea	s.t.
