= 1987 UCI Cyclo-cross World Championships =

Cyclo-cross championship

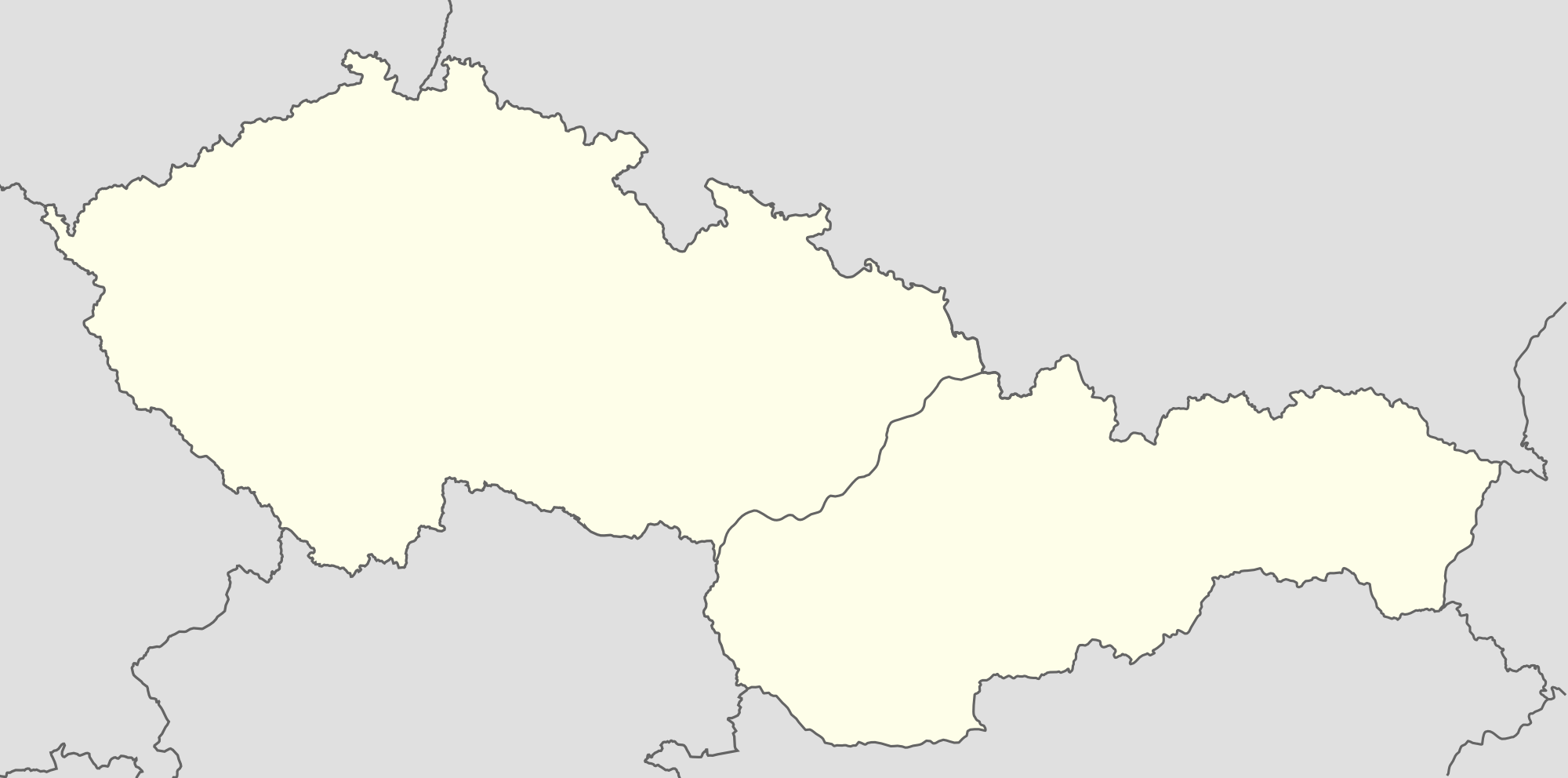
- Venue: (Czech Republic) Mladá Boleslav, Czechoslovakia
- Date: 24–25 January 1987
- Coordinates: 50°24′45″N 14°54′16″E
- Cyclists participating: 29 (Elite); 53 (Amateurs), 48 (Juniors)
- Events: 3

The 1987 UCI Cyclo-cross World Championships were held in Mladá Boleslav, Czechoslovakia on 24 and 25 January 1987. It was the 38th edition of the UCI Cyclo-cross World Championships.

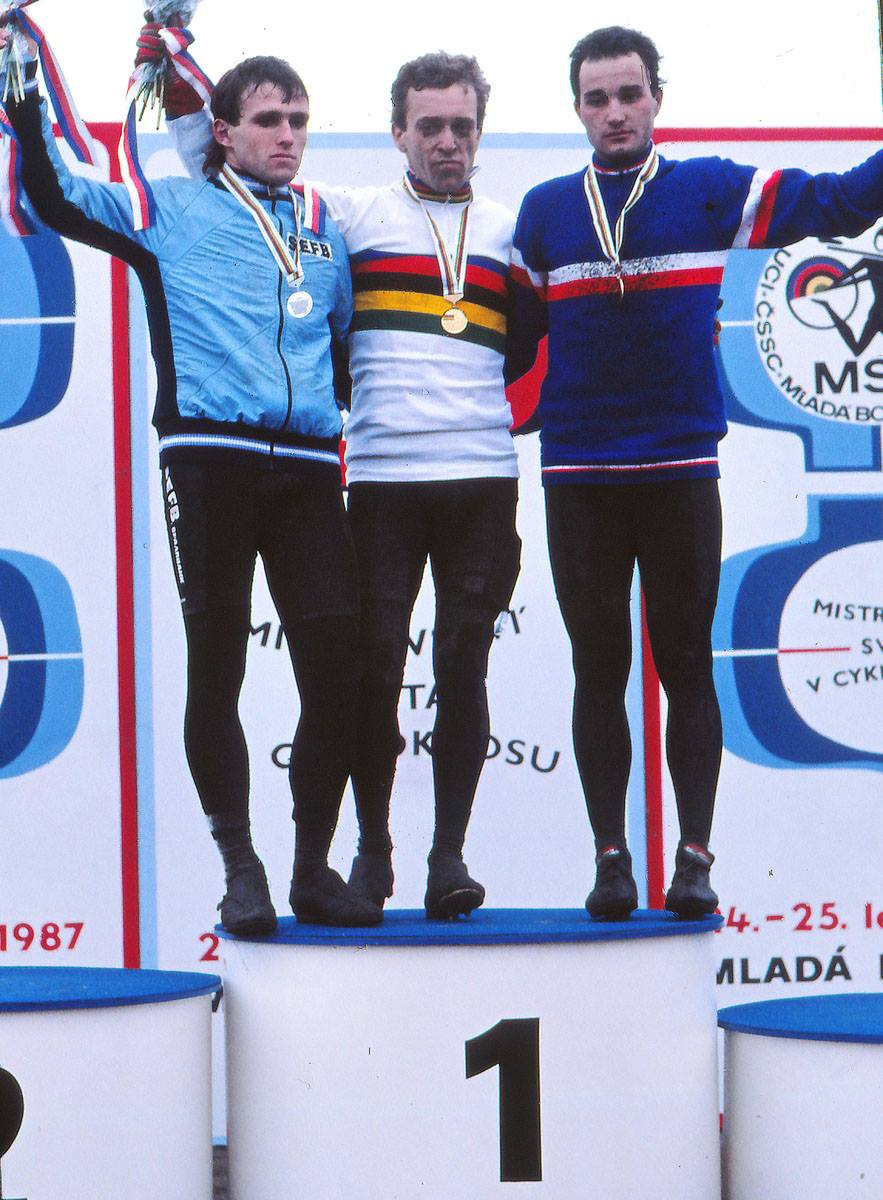
Men's Elite podium, from left: Danny de Bie, Klaus-Peter Thaler and Christoph Lavainne

== Men's Elite results ==
| RANK | NAME | TIME |
|---|---|---|
| Gold medal | Klaus-Peter Thaler (BRD) | 1:08:04 |
| Silver medal | Danny De Bie (BEL) | + 0:18 |
| Bronze medal | Christophe Lavainne (FRA) | + 1:20 |
| 4. | Hennie Stamsnijder (NED) | + 1:23 |
| 5. | Volker Krukenbaum (BRD) | + 1:38 |
| 6. | Frank van Bakel (NED) | + 2:13 |
| 7. | Reinier Groenendaal (NED) | + 2:15 |
| 8. | Albert Zweifel (SUI) | + 2:32 |
| 9. | Paul De Brauwer (BEL) | + 2:37 |
| 10. | Claude Michely (LUX) | + 2:39 |

== Men's Amateurs results ==
| RANK | NAME | TIME |
|---|---|---|
| Gold medal | Mike Kluge (BRD) | 1:03:40 |
| Silver medal | František Klouček (CZE) | + 0:03 |
| Bronze medal | Roman Kreuziger (CZE) | + 0:05 |
| 4. | Martin Hendriks (NED) | + 0:11 |
| 5. | Christian Redomski (BRD) | + 0:14 |
| 6. | Petr Klouček (CZE) | + 0:24 |
| 7. | Bruno Lebras (FRA) | + 0:38 |
| 8. | Hans-Rüdi Büchi (SUI) | + 0:43 |
| 9. | Peter Müller (SUI) | + 0:58 |
| 10. | Alex Moonen (BEL) | + 1:09 |

== Men's Juniors results ==
| RANK | NAME | TIME |
|---|---|---|
| Gold medal | Marc Janssens (BEL) | 48:46 |
| Silver medal | Ralph Berner (BRD) | + 0:26 |
| Bronze medal | Tomáš Port (CZE) | + 0:40 |
| 4. | Kurt De Roose (BEL) | + 1:03 |
| 5. | Luca Bramati (ITA) | s.t. |
| 6. | Daniël Van Steenbergen (BEL) | + 1:23 |
| 7. | Pavel Camrda (CZE) | + 1:27 |
| 8. | Kamil Polák (CZE) | + 1:42 |
| 9. | Wim de Vos (NED) | + 1:58 |
| 10. | Kai Hundertmarck (BRD) | + 2:05 |
