= Hans Daams =

Dutch cyclist

Personal information
- Born: 19 January 1962 (age 64) Valkenswaard, North Brabant, Netherlands

Cycling career
- Sport: Cycling

Johannes ("Hans") Wilhelmus Antonius Daams (born 19 January 1962) is a retired road bicycle racer from the Netherlands, who was a professional rider from 1985 to 1989. He represented his native country at the 1984 Summer Olympics in Los Angeles, California, in the individual road race where he didn't finish the race.

His daughter Jessie Daams is also a professional road bicycle racer.

== Teams ==
- 1985: Kwantum Hallen-Yoko (Netherlands)
- 1986: Kwantum Hallen-Yoko (Netherlands)
- 1987: PDM-Concorde (Netherlands)
- 1988: PDM-Concorde (Netherlands)
- 1989: PDM-Concorde (Netherlands)

== See also ==
- List of Dutch Olympic cyclists
