= 1991 Tour of Britain =

Race details
- Dates: 6–10 August 1991
- Stages: 5
- Winning time: 24h 59' 57"

Results
	Winner	Phil Anderson (AUS)	(Motorola)
	Second	Rudy Verdonck (BEL)	(Weinmann–Eddy Merckx)
	Third	Heinz Imboden (SUI)	(Helvetia–La Suisse)
	Points	Rudy Verdonck (BEL)	(Weinmann–Eddy Merckx)
	Mountains	Phil Anderson (AUS)	(Motorola)
	Team	Panasonic–Sportlife	

The 1991 Tour of Britain was the fifth edition of the Kellogg's Tour of Britain cycle race and was held from 6 August to 10 August 1991. The race started in Windsor and finished in Leeds. The race was won by Phil Anderson of the Motorola team.

== Route ==
Stage characteristics and winners
Stage	Date	Course	Distance	Type	Winner
1	6 August	Windsor to Birmingham	212.9 km (132.3 mi)		Phil Anderson (AUS)
2	7 August	Coventry to Lincoln	191.3 km (118.9 mi)		Johan Museeuw (BEL)
3	8 August	Lincoln to Buxton	183 km (113.7 mi)		Phil Anderson (AUS)
4a	9 August	Buxton to Manchester	108 km (67.1 mi)		Gianluca Bortolami (ITA)
4b	9 August	Manchester to Liverpool	91.2 km (56.7 mi)		Rolf Aldag (GER)
5	10 August	Liverpool to Leeds	208 km (129.2 mi)	Hilly stage	Adri van der Poel (NED)

== General classification ==
Final general classification

Rank	Rider	Team	Time
1	Phil Anderson (AUS)	Motorola	24h 59' 57"
2	Rudy Verdonck (BEL)	Weinmann–Eddy Merckx	+ 1"
3	Heinz Imboden (SUI)	Helvetia–La Suisse	+ 1"
4	Robert Millar (GBR)	Z	+ 17"
5	Jens Heppner (GER)	Panasonic–Sportlife	+ 41"
6	Allan Peiper (AUS)	Tulip Computers	+ 53"
7	Scott Sunderland (AUS)	TVM–Sanyo	+ 53"
8	Rob Holden (GBR)	Banana–Falcon	+ 53"
9	Eddy Bouwmans (NED)	Panasonic–Sportlife	+ 56"
10	Adri van der Poel (NED)	Tulip Computers	+ 3' 20"
