= 1986 Tirreno–Adriatico =

Race details
- Dates: 6–12 March 1986
- Stages: 6 + Prologue
- Distance: 980.8 km (609.4 mi)
- Winning time: 26h 52' 22"

Results
	Winner	Luciano Rabottini (ITA)	(Vini Ricordi–Pinarello–Sidermec)
	Second	Francesco Moser (ITA)	(Supermercati Brianzoli)
	Third	Giuseppe Petito (ITA)	(Gis Gelati)

The 1986 Tirreno–Adriatico was the 21st edition of the Tirreno–Adriatico cycle race and was held from 6 March to 12 March 1986. The race started in Ladispoli and finished in San Benedetto del Tronto. The race was won by Luciano Rabottini of the Vini Ricordi–Pinarello–Sidermec team.

== General classification ==
Final general classification

Rank	Rider	Team	Time
1	Luciano Rabottini (ITA)	Vini Ricordi–Pinarello–Sidermec	26h 52' 22"
2	Francesco Moser (ITA)	Supermercati Brianzoli	+ 1' 34"
3	Giuseppe Petito (ITA)	Gis Gelati	+ 2' 21"
4	Christophe Lavainne (FRA)	Système U	+ 2' 21"
5	Steven Rooks (NED)	PDM–Ultima–Concorde	+ 2' 24"
6	Acácio da Silva (POR)	Malvor–Bottecchia–Vaporella	+ 2' 30"
7	Roberto Visentini (ITA)	Carrera–Inoxpran	+ 2' 32"
8	Harald Maier (AUT)	Supermercati Brianzoli	+ 2' 36"
9	Heinz Imboden (SUI)	Cilo–Aufina–Gemeaz Cusin	+ 2' 50"
10	Teun van Vliet (NED)	Panasonic–Merckx–Agu	+ 2' 51"
