= Cholet Agglo Tour =

French one-day road cycling race

Race details
- Date: Mid-March
- Region: Pays de la Loire, France
- Nickname: Primavera of the Mauges
- Discipline: Road race
- Competition: UCI Europe Tour
- Type: Single-day
- Web site: www.choletpaysdelaloire.fr

History
- First edition: 1978
- Editions: 47 (as of 2026)
- First winner: Jacques Bossis (FRA)
- Most wins: Jaan Kirsipuu (EST) (3 wins)
- Most recent: Jenthe Biermans (BEL)

The Cholet Agglo Tour is a single-day road bicycle race held annually in March in Cholet, France. Since 2005, the race is organized as a 1.1 event on the UCI Europe Tour. It is often called Primavera of the Mauges due to its similarities with Belgian semi-classics because of the wind, short hills and some rain on the way to Cholet.

In 2026, the race was postponed until October.

== Name of the race ==
1978–1987: Grand Prix de Mauléon-Moulins
1988–1989: Grand Prix de Cholet-Mauléon-Moulins
1990–2007: Grand Prix de Cholet – Pays de Loire
2008–2023: Cholet-Pays de la Loire
2024–: Cholet Agglo Tour

== Winners ==
Year	Country	Rider	Team
1978	France	Jacques Bossis	Renault–Gitane
1979	France	Pierre Bazzo	La Redoute–Motobécane
1980	France	Roger Legeay	Peugeot–Esso–Michelin
1981	France	Roger Legeay	Peugeot–Esso–Michelin
1982	France	Pierre Bazzo	La Redoute–Mavic
1983	France	Eric Dall'Armelina	Sem–France Loire
1984	France	Pascal Poisson	Renault–Elf
1985	France	Marc Madiot	Renault–Elf
1986	France	Dominique Lecrocq	Système U
1987	France	Frédéric Garnier	Toshiba–Look
1988	Belgium	Patrick Onnockx	ADR–Enerday
1989	France	Franck Boucanville	Fagor–MBK
1990	Denmark	Kim Andersen	Z–Tomasso
1991	Belgium	Sammie Moreels	Lotto
1992	France	Laurent Desbiens	Collstrop–Garden Wood–Histor
1993	France	Marc Bouillon	Collstrop–Assur Carpets
1994	France	Laurent Madouas	Castorama
1995	Belgium	Frank Vandenbroucke	Mapei–GB
1996	France	Stéphane Heulot	GAN
1997	Estonia	Jaan Kirsipuu	Casino
1998	Estonia	Jaan Kirsipuu	Casino–Ag2r
1999	Estonia	Jaan Kirsipuu	Casino–Ag2r Prévoyance
2000	Germany	Jens Voigt	Crédit Agricole
2001	France	Florent Brard	Festina
2002	France	Jimmy Casper	Française des Jeux
2003	France	Christophe Mengin	FDJeux.com
2004	Belgium	Bert De Waele	Landbouwkrediet–Colnago
2005	France	Pierrick Fédrigo	Bouygues Télécom
2006	Australia	Chris Sutton	Cofidis
2007	France	Stéphane Augé	Cofidis
2008	Estonia	Janek Tombak	Mitsubishi–Jartazi
2009	Argentina	Juan José Haedo	Team Saxo Bank
2010	Colombia	Leonardo Duque	Cofidis
2011	France	Thomas Voeckler	Team Europcar
2012	France	Arnaud Démare	FDJ–BigMat
2013	France	Damien Gaudin	Team Europcar
2014	Belgium	Tom Van Asbroeck	Topsport Vlaanderen–Baloise
2015	France	Pierrick Fédrigo	Bretagne–Séché Environnement
2016	France	Rudy Barbier	Roubaix–Métropole Européenne de Lille
2017	No race due to dispute between organisers and mayor of Cholet.		
2018	France	Thomas Boudat	Direct Énergie
2019	France	Marc Sarreau	Groupama–FDJ
2020	No race due to the COVID-19 pandemic		
2021	Italy	Elia Viviani	Cofidis
2022	France	Marc Sarreau	AG2R Citroën Team
2023	New Zealand	Laurence Pithie	Groupama–FDJ
2024	France	Paul Lapeira	Decathlon–AG2R La Mondiale
2025	Slovakia	Lukáš Kubiš	Unibet Tietema Rockets
2026	Belgium	Jenthe Biermans	Cofidis
