= Luciano Rabottini =

Italian cyclist

Personal information
- Born: 23 January 1958 (age 68) Beyne-Heusay, Belgium

Cycling career
- Sport: Cycling
- Current team: Retired
- Discipline: Road
- Role: Rider

Professional teams
- 1981: Santin–Selle Italia
- 1982: Gis Gelati–Olmo
- 1983–1986: Metauro Mobili–Pinarello
- 1987–1989: Ariostea–Gres
- 1990: Gis Gelati–Benotto

Luciano Rabottini (born 23 January 1958) is an Italian former cyclist. He won the 1986 Tirreno–Adriatico, and rode in 9 editions of the Giro d'Italia.

== Major results ==
1979
1st Coppa San Sabino
1981
3rd Giro del Piemonte
5th Giro di Lombardia
1982
3rd Ruota d'Oro
1983
1st GP Industria & Commercio di Prato
1985
3rd Overall Giro di Puglia
1986
1st Overall Tirreno–Adriatico

1st Stage 1

6th Milan–San Remo
9th Giro di Lombardia
1989
1st Giro di Campania
1990
8th Tre Valli Varesine
10th Trofeo Laigueglia
