= Rocco Cattaneo =

Swiss politician and athlete

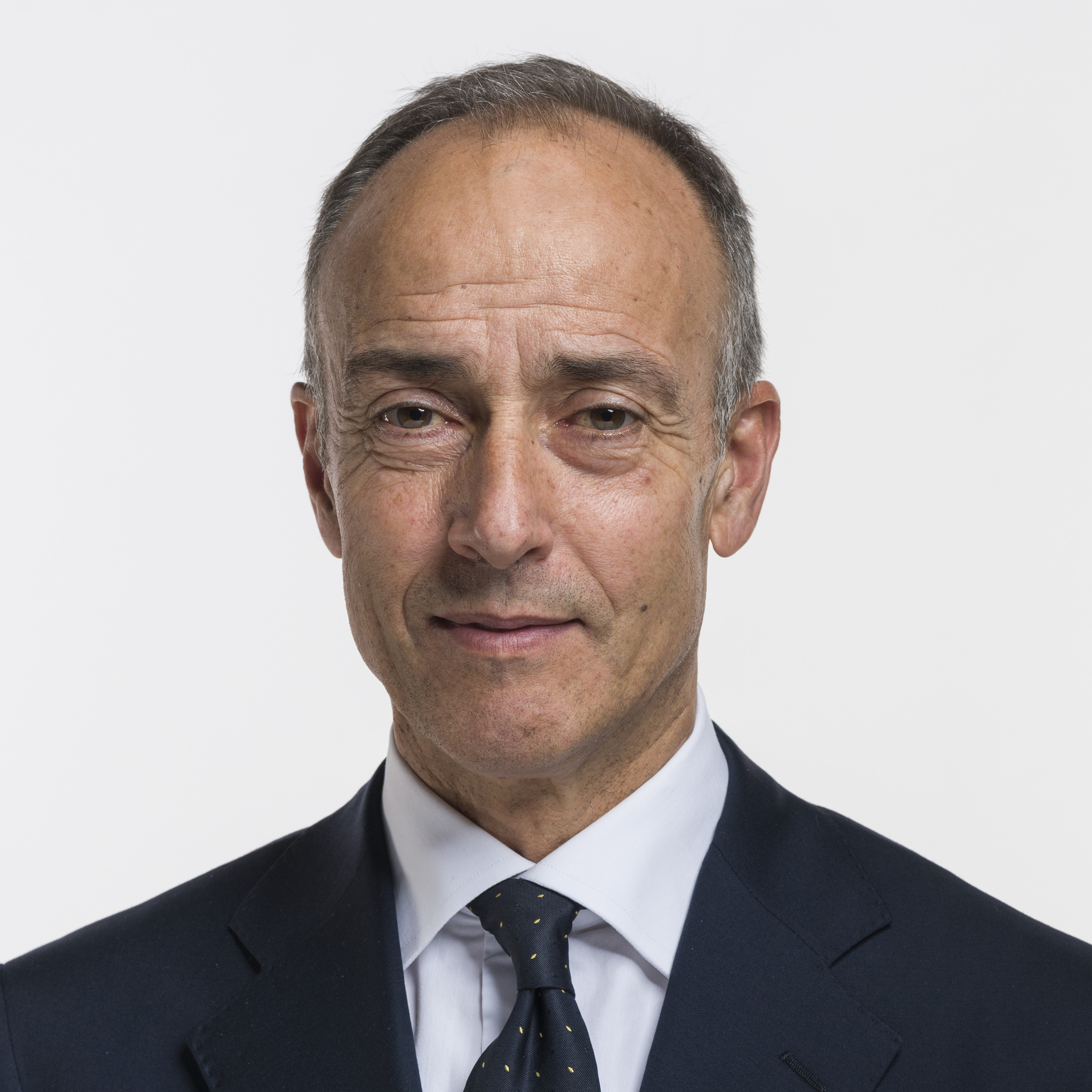
- Cattaneo in 2019

Member of the National Council of Switzerland
- In office 27 November 2017 – 3 December 2023
- Preceded by: Ignazio Cassis
- Succeeded by: Simone Gianini

President of the Union Européenne de Cyclisme
- In office 21 September 2017 – 6 March 2021
- Preceded by: David Lappartient
- Succeeded by: Enrico Della Casa

Personal details
- Born: Rocco Nicola Luigi Cattaneo; 6 December 1958 (age 67) Lugano, Switzerland
- Party: PLR
- Cycling career
- Sport: Cycling
- Current team: Retired
- Discipline: Road
- Role: Rider

Professional teams
- 1986: Cilo–Aufina–Gemeaz Cusin
- 1987: Paini–Bottecchia–Sidi
- 1994: Inoac–Deki

Rocco Nicola Luigi Cattaneo (born 6 December 1958) is a Swiss politician, entrepreneur and former professional road cyclist. As a politician, he served on the National Council from November 2017 to December 2023 as a member of The Liberals and he was the president of the Union Européenne de Cyclisme from 2017 until early 2021. He competed as a professional racing cyclist from 1985 to 1994.

== Biography ==
=== Business career ===
Cattaneo owns the company City Carburoil SA, which was founded by his father Egidio. Headquartered in Monteceneri, it operates petrol stations and rest areas on motorways. Cattaneo is also president of Monte Tamaro SA, which manages the infrastructure of Monte Tamaro and is the owner of the Splash & Spa Tamaro water park.

=== Political career ===
Cattaneo served for three legislative periods on the Municipal Parliament of his hometown of Bironico. From 2012 to 2017, he was President of The Liberals Party for the Canton of Ticino.

Cattaneo was elected to the National Council in 2017 as successor to Ignazio Cassis. He was sworn in on 27 November 2017 and remained in office until 3 December 2023.

=== Sporting official career ===
From 1989 to 1994 and from 2001 to 2003, Cattaneo was a member of the board of directors of Swiss Cycling. He was president of the organizing committees for the 1996 UCI Road World Championships in Lugano and the 2003 UCI Mountain Bike Marathon World Championships. Since 2006 he has been vice president of the World Cycling Centre in Aigle, a member of the management committee of the UCI and president of its audit and finance committee.

In March 2013, he was elected vice president of the Union Européenne de Cyclisme (UEC), of which he had already been a member of the board of directors from 2005 to 2013. In September 2017, he was elected interim president of the UEC after his predecessor David Lappartient had recently been elected president of the Union Cycliste Internationale (UCI). On 11 March 2018, he was re-elected as president. On 6 March 2021, he was replaced by Enrico Della Casa.

=== Cycling career ===
In 1976, Cattaneo won the Swiss junior national road race championships. In 1980, he was selected to ride for the Swiss national team in the Peace Race, placing 24th overall. In 1985, he won a stage of the GP Tell before turning professional the following year with Cilo–Aufina–Gemeaz Cusin. He competed in the 1986 and 1987 Giro d'Italia, finishing 30th in 1986. In 1987, he finished fifth overall in the Tour de Suisse. Cattaneo retired from professional cycling in 1994, ending his career at the UCI world road race championships. However, he has continued cycling as an amateur, having won his age group for the Maratona dles Dolomites in 2017.

==== Major results ====
1976
1st Road race, National Junior Road Championships
1985
1st Stage 2 GP Tell
1986
8th Milano–Vignola
9th Overall Tour Midi-Pyrénées
1987
5th Tour de Suisse
1994
3rd Road race, National Road Championships
4th Tour de Berne

== Personal life ==
Cattaneo is married and has three daughters.
