= Christophe Lavainne =

French cyclist (born 1963)

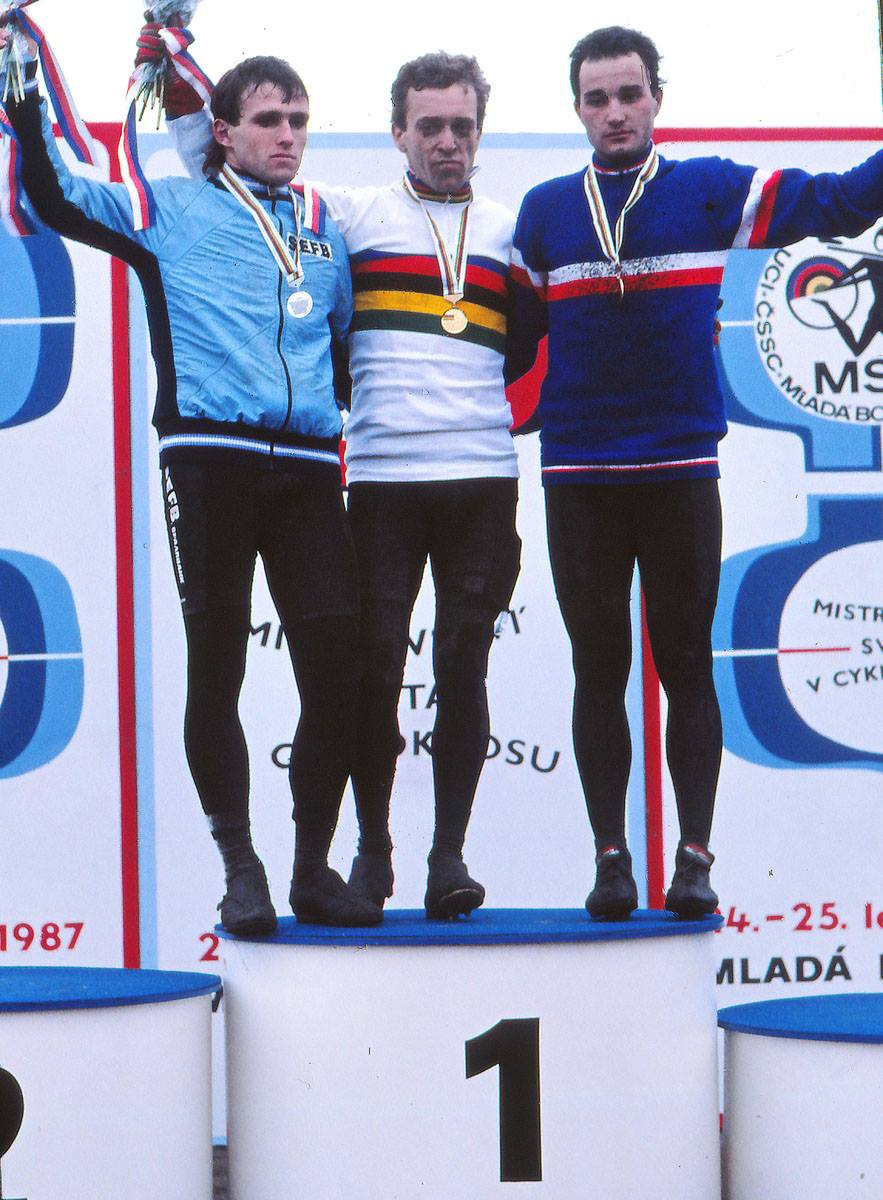
- Lavainne (right) at the 1987 UCI Cyclo-cross World Championships

Personal information
- Full name: Christophe Lavainne
- Born: 22 December 1963 (age 62) Châteaudun, France

Cycling career
- Sport: Cycling
- Disciplines: Road; Cyclo-cross
- Role: Rider

Professional teams
- 1984–1985: Renault–Elf
- 1986–1989: Système U
- 1990–1992: Castorama

Major wins
- Grand Tours Tour de France 1 individual stage (1987) 2 TTT stages (1986, 1989) Stage races Tour de Luxembourg (1984, 1990)
Medal record
Representing France
Men's cyclo-cross
World Championships
Bronze medal – third place	1987 Mladá Boleslav	Elite race

Christophe Lavainne (born 22 December 1963 in Châteaudun, Eure-et-Loir) is a French former professional bicycle racer. Lavaine was a two time French national cyclo-cross champion, and won a stage in the 1987 Tour de France.

== Major results ==
=== Road ===
1984
1st Overall Tour de Luxembourg
1985
1st Prologue Tour de Luxembourg
3rd Paris–Camembert
7th GP Ouest–France
1986
1st Stage 2 (TTT) Tour de France
3rd Grand Prix de Denain
4th Overall Tirreno–Adriatico
10th Overall Tour de Luxembourg
1987
1st Stage 6 Tour de France
1st Stage 4 Circuit de la Sarthe
9th Overall Ronde van Nederland
10th Grand Prix de Wallonie
1988
1st Stage 1 Tour of Ireland
3rd Grand Prix de Mauléon-Moulins
4th Overall Ronde van Nederland
4th Paris–Brussels
6th Elfstedenronde
1989
1st Stage 2 (TTT) Tour de France
4th Grand Prix de Fourmies
1990
1st Overall Tour de Luxembourg
6th Overall Four Days of Dunkirk
1992
1st Stages 3 & 5a Herald Sun Tour

==== Grand Tour general classification results timeline ====
Grand Tour	1985	1986	1987	1988	1989	1990	1991
Vuelta a España	—	67	69	—	—	—	—
Giro d'Italia	—	—	—	—	—	94	—
Tour de France	DNF	88	40	67	64	DNF	92

Legend
—	Did not compete
DNF	Did not finish

=== Cyclo-cross ===
1986–1987
2nd National Championships
3rd UCI World Championships
1987–1988
1st National Championships
5th UCI World Championships
1988–1989
1st Pétange
1st Rumelange
3rd National Championships
5th UCI World Championships
1989–1990
1st National Championships
