= Bruno Bruyere =

Belgian cyclist

Personal information
- Born: 31 December 1965 (age 60) Brussels, Belgium

Cycling career
- Sport: Cycling
- Role: Rider

Bruno Bruyere (born 31 December 1965) is a Belgian former professional racing cyclist. He rode in the 1988 Tour de France.
