= Ricardo Martínez Matey =

Spanish cyclist

Personal information
- Born: 23 April 1964 (age 62) Barcelona, Spain

Cycling career
- Sport: Cycling
- Current team: Retired
- Discipline: Road
- Role: Rider

Professional team
- 1985–1990: Kelme–Merckx

Ricardo Martínez Matey (born 23 April 1964) is a Spanish former racing cyclist. He rode in the 1988 Tour de France.

== Major results ==
1984
1st Vuelta a Murcia
1986
2nd Road race, National Road Championships
