= Francisco Antequera =

Spanish cyclist (born 1964)

Personal information
- Full name: Francisco José Antequera Alabau
- Born: 9 March 1964 (age 62) Castellar, Valencia, Spain

Cycling career
- Sport: Cycling
- Current team: Retired
- Role: Rider

Professional teams
- 1985-1986: Zor
- 1987-1990: B.H. Sport
- 1991-1993: Amaya Seguros

Francisco José Antequera Alabau (born 9 March 1964) was a Spanish racing cyclist. He competed in the individual road race event at the 1984 Summer Olympics. Professional from 1985 to 1993, he won the Vuelta a La Rioja and the Tour de Burgos. He was selector of the Spanish men's road racing team from 1997 to 2008.

== Major results ==
- 1984
  - (Spain) Spanish amateur road racing championships
- 1985
  - 1st stage of the Vuelta a La Rioja
  - Vuelta a La Rioja
- 1986
  - 3rd in the Vuelta a La Rioja
- 1987
  - 2nd in the Vuelta a Cantabria
  - 3rd in the Vuelta a Burgos
- 1989
  - 1st stage of the Vuelta a Burgos
  - Tour de Burgos
  - 2nd in the Clásica a los Puertos
  - 2nd in the Clásica de San Sebastián
- 1990
  - 2nd stage of the Vuelta a Cantabria

== Results in the grand tours ==
=== Tour de France ===
- 1986 : 94th
- 1987 : 117th
- 1988 : 121st
- 1989 : 111th
- 1992 : 109th

=== Vuelta a España ===
- 1986 : 83rd
- 1988 : 81st
