= Heinz Imboden =

Swiss cyclist (born 1962)

Personal information
- Born: 4 January 1962 (age 64) Bleienbach, Switzerland
- Height: 1.78 m (5 ft 10 in)
- Weight: 70 kg (154 lb)

Cycling career
- Sport: Cycling
- Discipline: Road
- Role: Rider

Professional teams
- 1985–1986: Cilo–Aufina
- 1987: Toshiba–Look
- 1988: Panasonic–Isostar–Colnago–Agu
- 1989: Super U–Raleigh–Fiat
- 1990–1991: Helvetia–La Suisse
- 1992: Subaru–Montgomery
- 1993: Mecair–Ballan
- 1994: Brescialat–Ceramiche Refin
- 1995–1996: Refin

Major wins
- Grand Tours Tour de France 1 TTT stage (1989) Stage races Giro del Trentino (1995)

Heinz Imboden (born 4 January 1962) is a Swiss former racing cyclist. He competed in the individual road race at the 1984 Summer Olympics. He also rode in nine Grand Tours between 1985 and 1996.

== Major results ==
1983
2nd Team time trial, UCI Road World Championships
2nd Overall Grand Prix Guillaume Tell
3rd Tour du lac Léman
1984
1st Overall Circuit des Ardennes
3rd Overall Tour du Loir-et-Cher
3rd Overall Grand Prix Guillaume Tell
1985
3rd Road race, National Road Championships
9th Trofeo Laigueglia
1986
1st Overall Grand Prix Guillaume Tell

1st Prologue & Stage 2b

2nd Grand Prix Cerami
4th Gent–Wevelgem
9th Overall Tirreno–Adriatico
10th Liège–Bastogne–Liège
1987
3rd Overall Tour of Ireland
1989
1st Giro del Lago Maggiore
1st Stage 2 (TTT) Tour de France
9th Tour du Nord-Ouest
1990
1st Stage 3 Grand Prix Guillaume Tell
1991
1st Stages 1 & 3 Tour de Suisse
3rd Overall Tour of Britain
1992
4th Giro dell'Emilia
9th Overall Tour de Suisse
10th Overall Tour Méditerranéen
10th Giro di Campania
1993
2nd Overall Tour Méditerranéen
4th Rund um den Henninger Turm
7th Wincanton Classic
1994
4th Overall Tour de Suisse

1st Stage6

1995
1st Overall Giro del Trentino

1st Stage 2

8th Overall Giro d'Italia
9th La Flèche Wallonne
9th Liège–Bastogne–Liège

=== Grand Tour general classification results timeline ===
Grand Tour	1985	1986	1987	1988	1989	1990	1991	1992	1993	1994	1995	1996
Giro d'Italia	70	61	—	—	—	—	—	—	17	DNF	8	50
Tour de France	—	—	DNF	—	DNF	—	—	—	—	—	—	DNF
Vuelta a España	—	—	—	—	—	—	—	—	—	—	—	—

Legend
—	Did not compete
DNF	Did not finish
