= Skala–Skil =

Dutch professional cycling team (1985–1986)

Team information
- Registered: Netherlands
- Founded: 1985
- Disbanded: 1986
- Discipline: Road
- Bicycles: Gazelle

Key personnel
- Team managers: Henk Liebregts; Roger Swerts

Team name history
- 1985 1986: Skala–Gazelle; Skala–Skil

Skala–Skil was a Dutch professional cycling team that existed from 1985 to 1986.

== Major wins ==
1985
Omloop der Kempen, John Bogers
Tour de l'Avenir

Stage 5, Jean-Paul van Poppel

Tour of Belgium

Stage 3a, Jean-Paul van Poppel

Danmark Rundt

Stage 6a, Jean-Paul van Poppel

Tour de l'Oise

Stage 1, Jean-Paul van Poppel

Four Days of Dunkirk

Stage 4, Marco van der Hulst

1986
Scheldeprijs, Jean-Paul van Poppel
Giro d'Italia

Stages 2 & 13, Jean-Paul van Poppel

Ronde van Nederland

Stage 5, Jean-Paul van Poppel

Tirreno–Adriatico

Stage 4, Jean-Paul van Poppel

Tour of Belgium

Prologue, Ferdi Van Den Haute
Stage 3, Nico Verhoeven

Danmark Rundt

Stage 5a, Jean-Paul van Poppel
Stage 6, Marco van der Hulst
