= Johannes Draaijer =

Dutch cyclist (1963–1990)

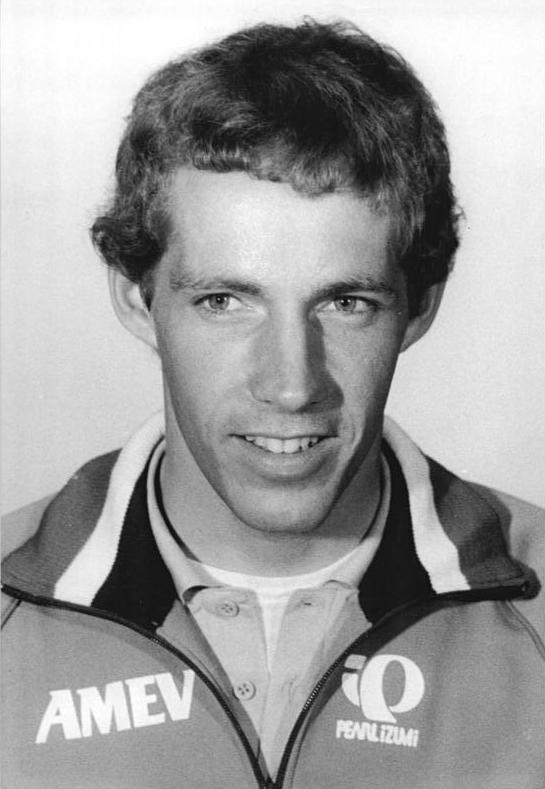
- Johannes Draaijer in 1987

Personal information
- Born: 8 March 1963 Nijemirdum, the Netherlands
- Died: 27 February 1990 (aged 26) Hoeven, the Netherlands

Sport
- Sport: Cycling
- Club: PDM – Concorde

Johannes Draaijer (8 March 1963 – 27 February 1990) was a Dutch cyclist. He won two stages of the Peace Race in 1987 and one stage of the Vuelta a Murcia in 1989. The same year he finished 130th in the Tour de France and was part of the team that won the race.

On 27 February 1990, Draaijer died in his sleep of heart block, just a few days after a race. It is widely presumed, though not proven, that his death was caused by the use of the performance-enhancing drug erythropoietin (EPO). The autopsy did not specify the cause of death, but Draaijer's wife later told the German news magazine, Der Spiegel, that her husband became sick after using EPO. This was the second death of a Dutch cyclist that was attributed to EPO, after the demise of Bert Oosterbosch in 1989.
