= Luciano Loro =

Italian cyclist

Personal information
- Born: 7 November 1954 (age 71) Bassano del Grappa, Italy

Cycling career
- Sport: Cycling
- Role: Rider

Luciano Loro (born 7 November 1954) is an Italian former professional racing cyclist. He rode in three editions of the Tour de France.
