= Nico Verhoeven =

Dutch racing cyclist (born 1961)

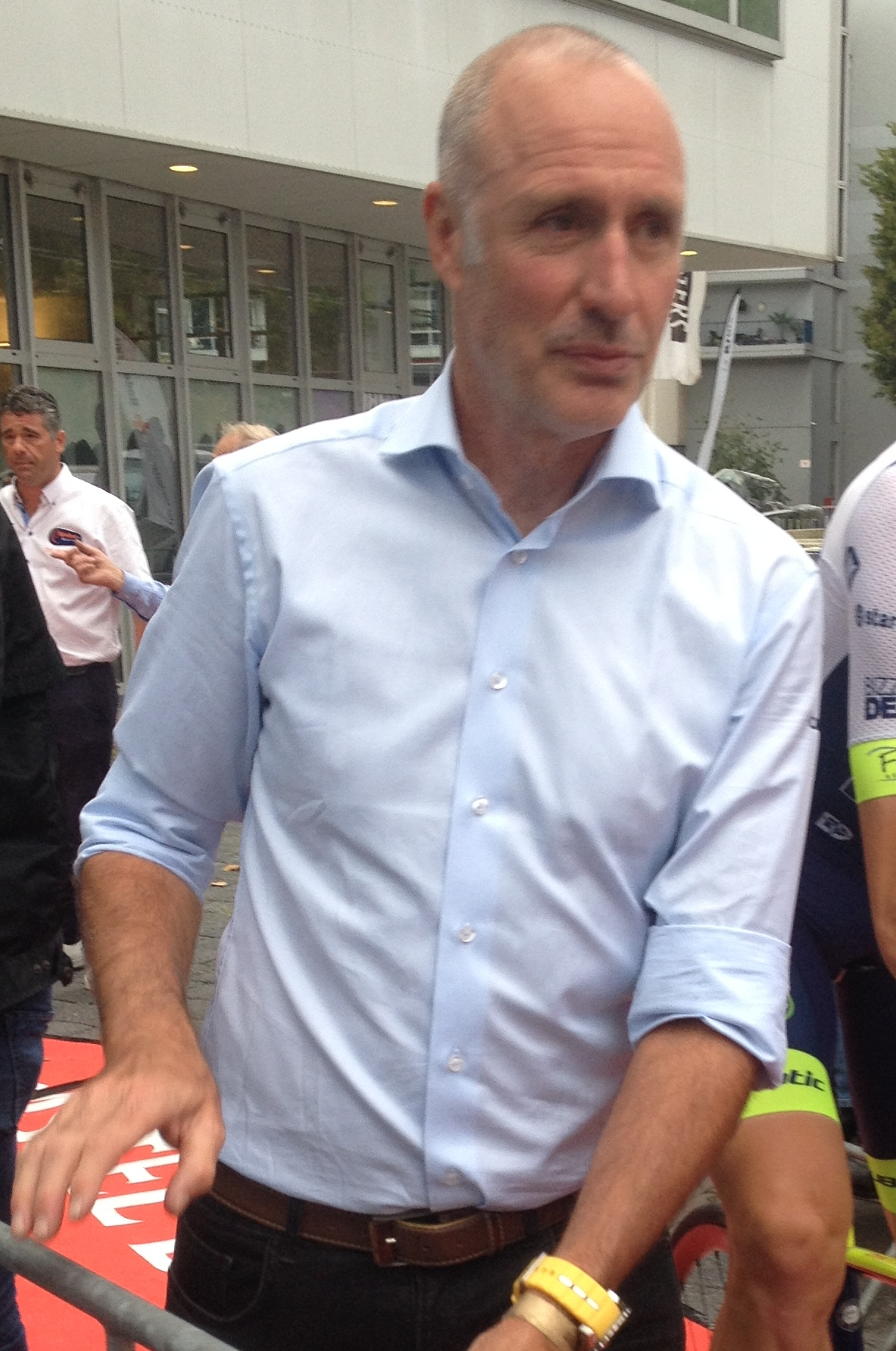

Personal information
- Full name: Nicolaas Cornelis Maria Verhoeven
- Born: 2 October 1961 (age 65) Berkel-Enschot, Netherlands

Cycling career
- Sport: Cycling
- Current team: Retired
- Discipline: Road
- Role: Rider

Professional teams
- 1985–1986: Skala
- 1987–1989: Superconfex–Yoko
- 1990–1992: PDM–Concorde
- 1993–1994: Novemail–Histor–Laser Computer
- 1995: Palmans-Ipso

Major wins
- 1 stage 1987 Tour de France

Nicolaas ("Nico") Cornelis Maria Verhoeven (born 2 October 1961 in Berkel-Enschot, North Brabant) is a Dutch retired road bicycle racer, who was a professional rider from 1985 to 1995. He represented his native country at the 1984 Summer Olympics in Los Angeles, in the individual road race where he didn't finish the race. Verhoeven won the first stage in the 1987 Tour de France.

== Major results ==
1984
Netherlands National Amateur Road Race Championship
1985
Anderlecht
Bodegraven
Nieuw-Amsterdam
Profronde van Pijnacker
Zes van Rijn & Gouwe
1986
Ulvenhout
1987
Tiel
Tour de France:

Winner stage 1

Grote Prijs Stad Zottegem
1988
Tilburg
1989
Made
1990
Houtem
1991
Mijl van Mares
1992
Omloop der Vlaamse Ardennen
Kelmis
1995
Mijl van Mares
Boxmeer

== See also ==
- List of Dutch Olympic cyclists
