= PDM (cycling team) =

Team information
- UCI code: PDM
- Registered: Netherlands
- Founded: 1986
- Disbanded: 1992
- Discipline: Road

Team name history
- 1986–1989 1990–1991 1992: PDM–Ultima–Concorde; PDM–Concorde–Ultima; PDM–Ultima–Concorde
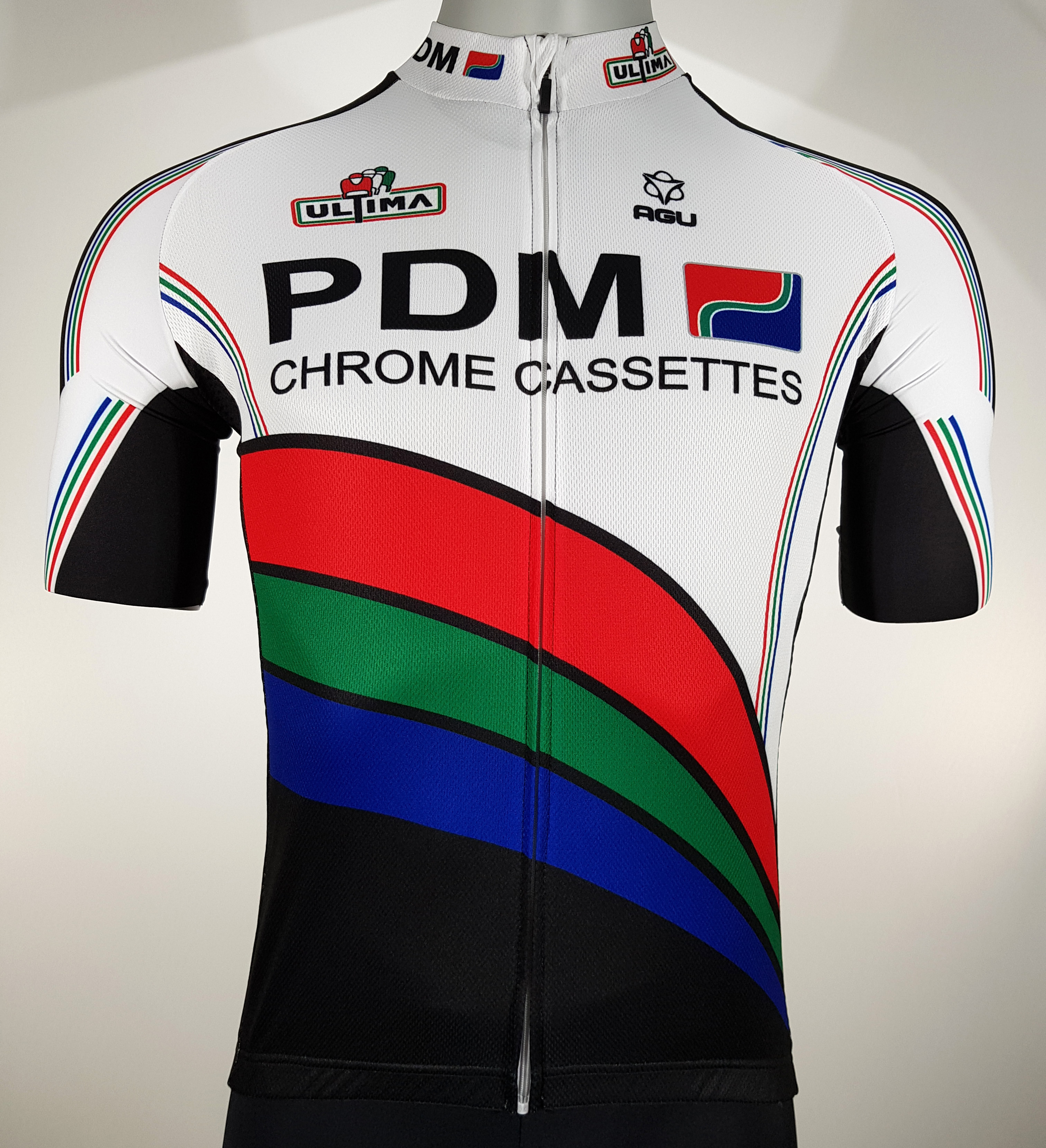
PDM jersey
Jersey

PDM (UCI team code: PDM) was a Dutch professional cycling team from 1986 until the end of 1992. Gin-MG was co-sponsor in Spanish races and Cidona was co-sponsor in the 1991 Nissan Classic. The team was sponsored by Philips Dupont Magnetics, a joint venture between the electronics company, Philips, and the chemical company, DuPont. The team rode Concorde bicycles, manufactured in Italy, by several builders that were colour coordinated to the team jersey by Ultima.

== History ==
Roy Schuiten was team manager and Jan Gisbers directeur sportif in 1986. Gisbers took over as the team manager the following year and remained until 1992. He was joined by Piet van der Kruijs and Ferdi van den Haute. The team was owned by Manfred Krikke, of Veltec Rentmeester.

The team was successful in classics and had a rider second overall in the Tour de France in 1987 with Pedro Delgado and 1988 with Steven Rooks. It also had third place with Erik Breukink in 1990. It won the Tour team classification in 1988 and 1989. PDM rider Gert-Jan Theunisse was second in the 1988 Tour de France, battling former PDM teammate Pedro Delgado, when he tested positive for testosterone and received a 10-minute penalty.

The team dropped out of the 1991 Tour de France with reported food poisoning. Team members and team doctor Wim Sanders said in a TV documentary in 2008 that the cause was careless storage of Intralipid, a nutritional aid with which riders had been injected. The team continued one more year, after which the sponsor sold the team to Festina.

== Doping affair ==
In November 1997 Cyclingnews.com reported an inquiry in The Netherlands, which appeared to reveal doping in the PDM team. Wim Sanders, the doctor from 1990 to 1991, was the centre of the investigation, which was initiated when the general manager of the team, Manfred Krikke, called the Fiscal Information and Investigation Service to investigate. It was said Sanders supplied anabolic steroids and EPO to the team and was responsible for the intralipid affair of the 1991 Tour de France. According to Cyclingnews.com, 1990 was the height of the drug taking in the team and two riders stopped with heart problems; whether this refers to stopping professional cycling or performance-enhancing drugs was unclear. Gisbers denied knowledge of doping.

== Major results ==
1986
Overall Vuelta a Andalucía, Steven Rooks

Prologue, Steven Rooks
Stage 2, Wim Arras

Amstel Gold Race, Steven Rooks
GP de Wallonie, Steven Rooks
Stage 2 Tour de Suisse, Gerrie Knetemann
Stage 12 Tour de France, Pedro Delgado
Profronde van Oostvoorne, Gerrie Knetemann
Stage 2a Volta a Catalunya, Wim Arras
Memorial Fred De Bruyne, Wim Arras
Munte Cyclo-cross, Hennie Stamsnijder
Oss Cyclo-cross, Hennie Stamsnijder
Overijse Cyclo-cross, Hennie Stamsnijder
Loenhout Cyclo-cross, Hennie Stamsnijder

1987
Netherlands National Cyclo-cross Championship, Hennie Stamsnijder
Overall Superprestige Cyclo-cross, Hennie Stamsnijder
Zillebeke Cyclo-cross, Hennie Stamsnijder
Ronde van Limburg, Wim Arras
Sprint classification Setmana Catalana de Ciclismo, Hans Daams

Stages 1b & 3, Wim Arras

Galder Criterium, Adri van der Poel
Made Criterium, Wim Arras
Stage 2 Tour de Suisse, Steven Rooks
Humbeek Road Race, Marc Dierickx
Netherlands National Road Race Championship, Adri van der Poel
Switzerland National Road Race Championship, Jörg Müller
Stage 9 Tour de France, Adri van der Poel
Stage 19 Tour de France, Pedro Delgado
Boxmeer Criterium, Adri van der Poel
Profronde van Stiphout, Pedro Delgado
Noordwijk aan Zee Derny, Adri van der Poel
GP du canton d'Argovie, Adri van der Poel
Heusden Individueel, Henri Manders
Profronde van Maastricht, Wim Arras
Dongen Criterium, Peter Stevenhaagen
Anderlues Criterium, Gerrie Knetemann
Wetteren Derny, Peter Hoondert
GP de Fourmies, Adri van der Poel
Stage 6 Volta a Catalunya, Jörg Müller
Paris–Brussels, Wim Arras
Paris–Tours, Adri van der Poel
Giro del Piemonte, Adri van der Poel
Oss Cyclo-cross, Hennie Stamsnijder
Valkenswaard Cyclo-cross, Hennie Stamsnijder
Loenhout Cyclo-cross, Hennie Stamsnijder

1988
Netherlands National Cyclo-cross Championship, Hennie Stamsnijder
Overijse Cyclo-cross, Hennie Stamsnijder
Stage 5 Vuelta a Andalucía, Adri van der Poel
Overall Étoile de Bessèges, Adri van der Poel
Liège–Bastogne–Liège, Adri van der Poel
Apeldoorn Criterium, Steven Rooks
Mountains classification Tour de France, Steven Rooks

Stage 12, Steven Rooks
Stage 16, Adri van der Poel

Boxmeer Criterium, Gert-Jan Theunisse
Draai van de Kaai, Steven Rooks
Mijl van Mares, Adri van der Poel
Stage 1 Deurne, Steven Rooks
Clásica de San Sebastián, Gert-Jan Theunisse
Regenboogkoers, Gert-Jan Theunisse
Kampioenschap van Zürich, Steven Rooks
Trio Normand, Vincent Barteau
Saint-Pierre Criterium, Adri van der Poel
Oss Cyclo-cross, Hennie Stamsnijder

1989
Overall Superprestige Cyclo-cross, Hennie Stamsnijder
Zillebeke Cyclo-cross, Hennie Stamsnijder
Stage 1 Vuelta a Murcia, Johannes Draaijer
Overall Tour du Vaucluse, Steven Rooks
Liège–Bastogne–Liège, Sean Kelly
Tom Simpson Memorial Grand Prix, Martin Earley
Stage 4 Tour de Trump, Gert-Jan Theunisse
Overall Vuelta a Asturias, Gert-Jan Theunisse

Points classification, Gert-Jan Theunisse
Stage 6a, Gert-Jan Theunisse
Stage 6b, John Vos

Hansweert Criterium, Peter Hoondert
Points classification Tour de France, Sean Kelly

Mountains classification, Gert-Jan Theunisse
Teams classification (Note: The riders on the squad were Sean Kelly, Marc Van Orsouw, Steven Rooks, Gert-Jan Theunisse, Raúl Alcalá, Johannes Draaijer, Jörg Müller & Martin Earley)
Stage 3, Raúl Alcalá
Stage 8, Martin Earley
Stage 15, Steven Rooks
Stage 17, Gert-Jan Theunisse

Ronse, Sean Kelly
Wateringen, Marc Van Orsouw
Maarheeze, Steven Rooks
Montréal, Jörg Müller
Stage 2b (TTT) Volta a Catalunya (Note: The riders on the squad were Marc Van Orsouw, Steven Rooks, Gert-Jan Theunisse, Raúl Alcalá, Dag Erik Pedersen & Rudy Dhaenens)
Mountains classification Tour of Ireland, Sean Kelly

Teams classification (Note: The riders on the squad were Raúl Alcalá, Martin Earley, Rudy Dhaenens & Sean Kelly)

UCI Road World Cup, Sean Kelly

1990
Stage 5 Étoile de Bessèges, John Van Den Akker
Combination classification Volta a la Comunitat Valenciana, John Vos

Stage 4, Uwe Raab

Stage 5 Vuelta a Murcia, John Van Den Akker
Grote Prijs Berloz, Uwe Raab
Sprint classification Vuelta a España, Uwe Raab

Stage 8, Atle Pedersen
Stages 10, 16 & 22, Uwe Raab

Bavel Criterium, Jos Van Aert
Purnode Criterium, Dirk De Wolf
Overall Tour de Suisse, Sean Kelly

Stage 4, Sean Kelly
Stage 5, Erik Breukink
Stage 10, Uwe Ampler

Stage 7 Tour de France, Raúl Alcalá
Mosselkoers–Houtem–Vilvoorde Ind., Nico Verhoeven
Stages 12 & 20 Tour de France, Erik Breukink
Profronde van Wateringen, Erik Breukink
Draai van de Kaai, Erik Breukink
UCI Road World Championships, Rudy Dhaenens
Tongeren Criterium, Rudy Dhaenens
Stage 7a Volta a Catalunya, Erik Breukink
Grand Prix de la Libération (TTT) (Note: The riders on the squad were Erik Breukink, Uwe Raab, Uwe Ampler, Sean Kelly & Gert Jakobs)
Aalsmeer Criterium, Gert Jakobs
Beernem Criterium, Rudy Dhaenens
Overall Tour of Ireland, Erik Breukink

Stage 2a, Erik Breukink

Oostrozebeke Criterium, Rudy Dhaenens
1990 UCI Road World Cup Finale, Erik Breukink
Stages 1 & 2 Vuelta y Ruta de Mexico, Nico Verhoeven

1991
Stage 5 Paris–Nice, Jean-Paul van Poppel
Stages 3, 5a & 6 Vuelta a Aragón, Jean-Paul van Poppel
Stage 5b Vuelta a Aragón, Uwe Raab
Stage 5 Vuelta a España, Uwe Raab
Points classification Vuelta a España, Uwe Raab

Stages 6, 9, 13 & 21, Jean-Paul van Poppel

Overall Tour DuPont, Erik Breukink

Prolgoue & Stage 11, Erik Breukink

Stage 1 Critérium du Dauphiné, John Talen
Stage 1a Vuelta a los Valles Mineros, John Talen
Stage 4 Vuelta a los Valles Mineros, Harald Maier
Germany National Road Race Championship, Falk Boden
Stage 7 Tour de France, Jean-Paul van Poppel
Profronde van Stiphout, Erik Breukink
Mijl van Mares, Nico Verhoeven
Giro di Lombardia, Sean Kelly
Lieshout Cyclo-cross, Martin Hendriks
Loenhout Cyclo-cross, Nico Verhoeven

1992
Stage 8 Tour Méditerranéen, Jean-Paul van Poppel
Omloop der Vlaamse Ardennen, Nico Verhoeven
Stage 1 Vuelta a Murcia, Jean-Paul van Poppel
Stage 3 Vuelta a Murcia, Nico Verhoeven
Stage 5 Vuelta a Aragón, Danny Nelissen
Stages 3 & 5 Vuelta a España, Jean-Paul van Poppel
Stage 7 Vuelta a España, Erik Breukink
Stage 16 Vuelta a España, Tom Cordes
GP de Wallonie, Danny Nelissen
Ronde van Limburg, Jans Koerts
Stage 1a Vuelta a los Valles Mineros, Uwe Raab
Kelmis–Ostbelgien-rundfahrt, Nico Verhoeven
Stage 10 Tour de France, Jean-Paul van Poppel
Profronde van Wateringen, Erik Breukink
Clásica de San Sebastián, Raúl Alcalá
Profronde van Surhuisterveen, Gert Jakobs
Melsele Road Race, John Talen
Giro del Piemonte, Erik Breukink

== Team riders ==
1986	1987	1988	1989	1990	1991	1992
David Akam (GBR)	Adri van der Poel (NED)	Adri van der Poel (NED)	Raúl Alcalá (MEX)	Raúl Alcalá (MEX)	Raúl Alcalá (MEX)	Raúl Alcalá (MEX)
Wim Arras (BEL)	Wim Arras (BEL)	Wim Arras (BEL)	Martin Earley (IRE)	Martin Earley (IRE)	Martin Earley (IRE)	Martin Earley (IRE)
Mariano Magdaleno (ESP)	José Martínez (ESP)	Vincent Barteau (FRA)	Sean Kelly (IRE)	Sean Kelly (IRE)	Sean Kelly (IRE)	Mario Kummer (GER)
René Beuker (NED)	René Beuker (NED)	Johannes Draaijer (NED)	Johannes Draaijer (NED)	Johannes Draaijer (NED)	Tom Cordes (NED)	Tom Cordes (NED)
Henk Boeve (NED)	Henk Boeve (NED)	Andy Bishop (USA)	Andy Bishop (USA)	Erik Breukink (NED)	Erik Breukink (NED)	Erik Breukink (NED)
Jonathan Boyer (USA)	Gert-Jan Theunisse (NED)	Gert-Jan Theunisse (NED)	Gert-Jan Theunisse (NED)	Uwe Ampler (GER)	Falk Boden (GER)	Falk Boden (GER)
Pedro Delgado (ESP)	Pedro Delgado (ESP)	Greg LeMond (USA)	Nico Verhoeven (NED)	Nico Verhoeven (NED)	Nico Verhoeven (NED)	Nico Verhoeven (NED)
Peter Hoondert (NED)	Peter Hoondert (NED)	Peter Hoondert (NED)	Peter Hoondert (NED)	Peter Hoondert (NED)	Thomas Dürst (GER)	Thomas Dürst (GER)
Gerrie Knetemann (NED)	Gerrie Knetemann (NED)	Gerrie Knetemann (NED)	Gerrie Knetemann (NED)	Maarten den Bakker (NED)	Maarten den Bakker (NED)	Maarten den Bakker (NED)
Hans Langerijs (NED)	Hans Daams (NED)	Hans Daams (NED)	Hans Daams (NED)	Uwe Raab (GER)	Uwe Raab (GER)	Uwe Raab (GER)
Stefan Mutter (SUI)	Stefan Mutter (SUI)	Stefan Mutter (SUI)	John Van den Akker (NED)	John Van den Akker (NED)	John Van den Akker (NED)	John Van den Akker (NED)
Steven Rooks (NED)	Steven Rooks (NED)	Steven Rooks (NED)	Steven Rooks (NED)	Gerhard Zadrobilek (AUT)	Andreas Walzer (GER)	Andreas Walzer (GER)
Jan Siemons (NED)	Jan Siemons (NED)	Rudy Dhaenens (BEL)	Rudy Dhaenens (BEL)	Rudy Dhaenens (BEL)	Jean-Paul van Poppel (NED)	Jean-Paul van Poppel (NED)
Hennie Stamsnijder (NED)	Hennie Stamsnijder (NED)	Hennie Stamsnijder (NED)	Hennie Stamsnijder (NED)	Harald Maier (AUT)	Harald Maier (AUT)	Harald Maier (AUT)
Peter Stevenhaagen (NED)	Peter Stevenhaagen (NED)	Peter Stevenhaagen (NED)	John Vos (NED)	John Vos (NED)	John Vos (NED)	John Vos (NED)
Fritz Van Bindsbergen (NED)	Henri Manders (NED)	Frank Kersten (NED)	Frank Kersten (NED)	Frank Kersten (NED)	Martin Hendriks (NED)	Martin Hendriks (NED)
Marc Van Orsouw (NED)	Marc Van Orsouw (NED)	Marc Van Orsouw (NED)	Marc Van Orsouw (NED)	Marc Van Orsouw (NED)	Jans Koerts (NED)	Jans Koerts (NED)
Jan Van Wijk (NED)	Jörg Müller (SUI)	Jörg Müller (SUI)	Jörg Müller (SUI)	Danny Nelissen (NED)	Danny Nelissen (NED)	Danny Nelissen (NED)
Gerard Veldscholten (NED)	Gerard Veldscholten (NED)	Atle Pedersen (NOR)	Atle Pedersen (NOR)	Atle Pedersen (NOR)	John Talen (NED)	John Talen (NED)
19 Riders	Marc Dierickx (BEL)	Marc Dierickx (BEL)	Dag Erik Pedersen (NOR)	Dirk De Wolf (BEL)	Peter Van Petegem (BEL)	Peter Van Petegem (BEL)
	20 Riders	Dag Erik Pedersen (NOR)	20 Riders	Gert Jakobs (NED)	Gert Jakobs (NED)	Gert Jakobs (NED)
		21 Riders		Jos van Aert (NED)	Jos van Aert (NED)	Jos van Aert (NED)
				22 Riders	22 Riders	Kai Hundertmarck (GER)
						23 Riders
