= Marco Tabai =

Italian cyclist

Personal information
- Born: 18 November 1961 (age 64) Rezzato, Italy

Cycling career
- Sport: Cycling
- Role: Rider

Marco Tabai (born 18 November 1961) is an Italian former professional racing cyclist. He rode in the 1988 Tour de France.
