= Frédéric Garnier =

French cyclist

Personal information
- Born: 11 March 1964 (age 62) Orléans, France

Cycling career
- Sport: Cycling
- Role: Rider

Amateur teams
- 1983–1985: Vineuil Sportif
- 1990: Colas Sud-Ouest–Centre Interim
- 1991–1994: AC Creusoise

Professional team
- 1986–1989: La Vie Claire

Frédéric Garnier (born 11 March 1964) is a French former professional racing cyclist. He rode in the 1988 Tour de France, finishing 108th overall. He also placed 98th overall in the 1986 Giro d'Italia. His most notable victory was the 1987 Grand Prix de Mauléon-Moulins.

== Major results ==
1985
1st Stage 1 Étoile des Espoirs
1987
1st Grand Prix de Mauléon-Moulins
1st Stage 1 Grand Prix du Midi Libre
1988
1st Prologue (TTT) Paris–Nice
1989
5th Paris–Camembert
5th Trophée des Grimpeurs
