= Gert Jakobs =

Dutch cyclist

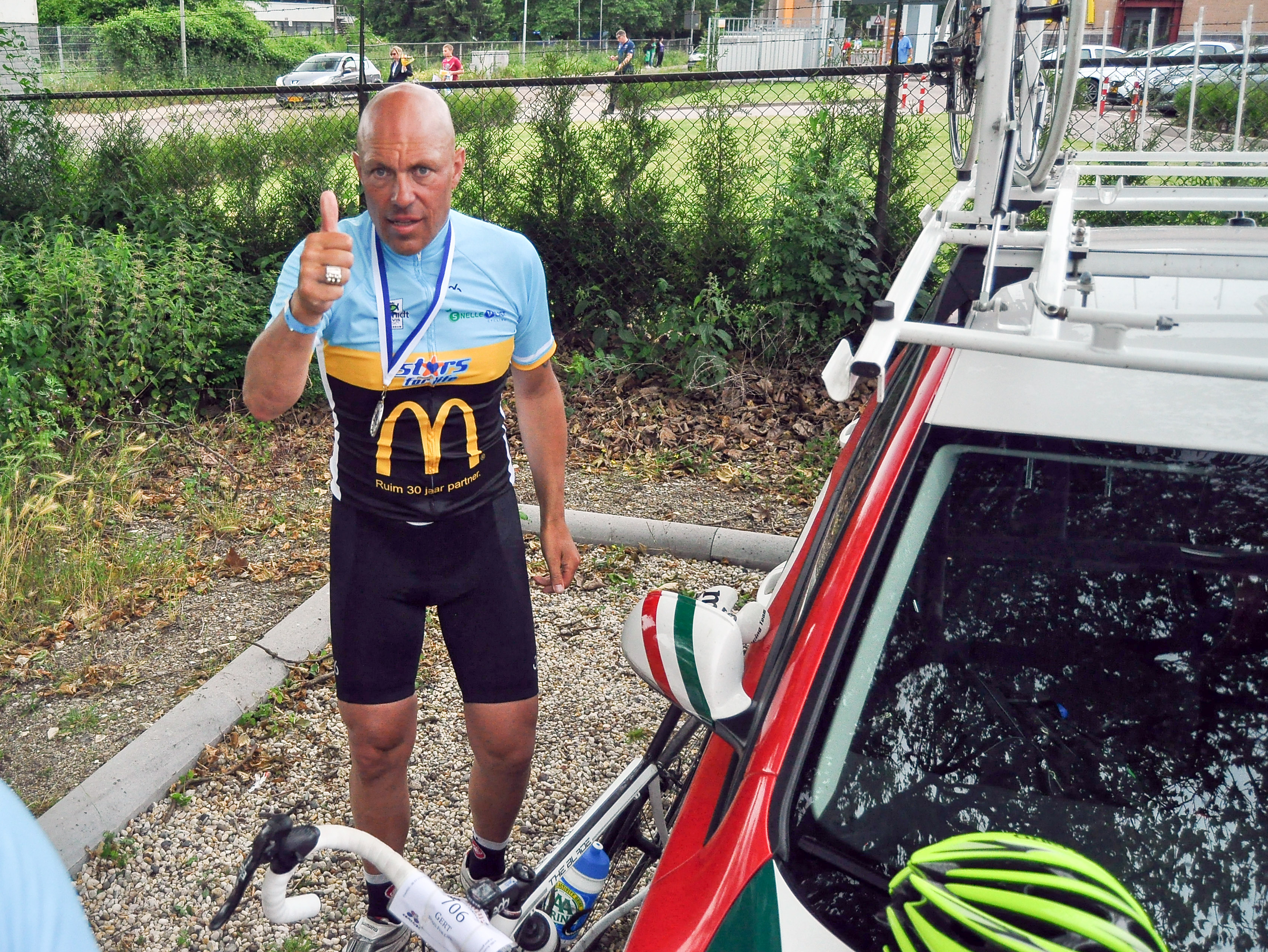

Personal information
- Born: 29 April 1964 (age 62) Emmen, Netherlands

Cycling career
- Sport: Cycling
- Role: Rider

Gert Jakobs (born 29 April 1964) is a Dutch former racing cyclist. He rode in ten Grand Tours between 1986 and 1993. He also competed in the team time trial event at the 1984 Summer Olympics. Jakobs has admitted to have used EPO during his career. EPO was not yet on the doping list in 1989, so he did not violate the doping rules with it.

== See also ==
- List of Dutch Olympic cyclists
