= Gerhard Zadrobilek =

Austrian cyclist

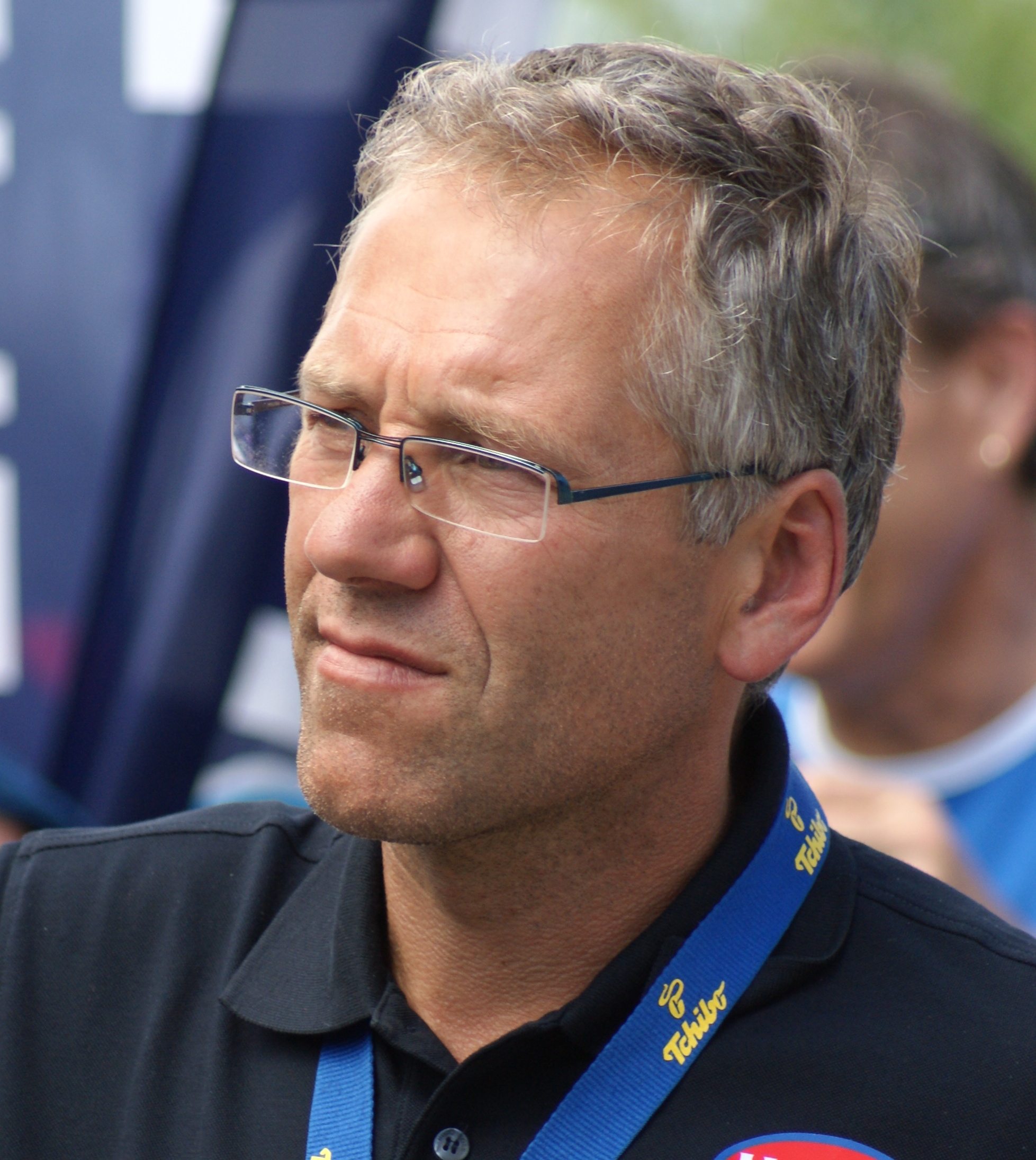

Personal information
- Full name: Gerhard Zadrobilek
- Born: 23 June 1961 (age 65) Breitenfurt bei Wien, Austria

Cycling career
- Sport: Cycling
- Current team: Retired
- Discipline: Road
- Role: Rider

Professional teams
- 1982: Puch-Eorotex
- 1983: Eorotex-Magniflex
- 1984–1985: Atala
- 1986–1987: Supermercati Brianzoli
- 1988: Weinmann-La Suisse
- 1989: 7 Eleven
- 1990: PDM-Concorde

Major wins
- Clásica de San Sebastián (1989)

Gerhard Zadrobilek (born 23 June 1961) is an Austrian former professional road bicycling racer.

== Major results ==
1981
1st, Overall, Tour of Austria
1984
1st, Chur-Arosa
1987
1st, Giro del Veneto
14th, Tour de France
1989
1st, Clásica de San Sebastián
