= 1988 Tour de France, Stage 12 to Stage 22 =

Cycling race stages

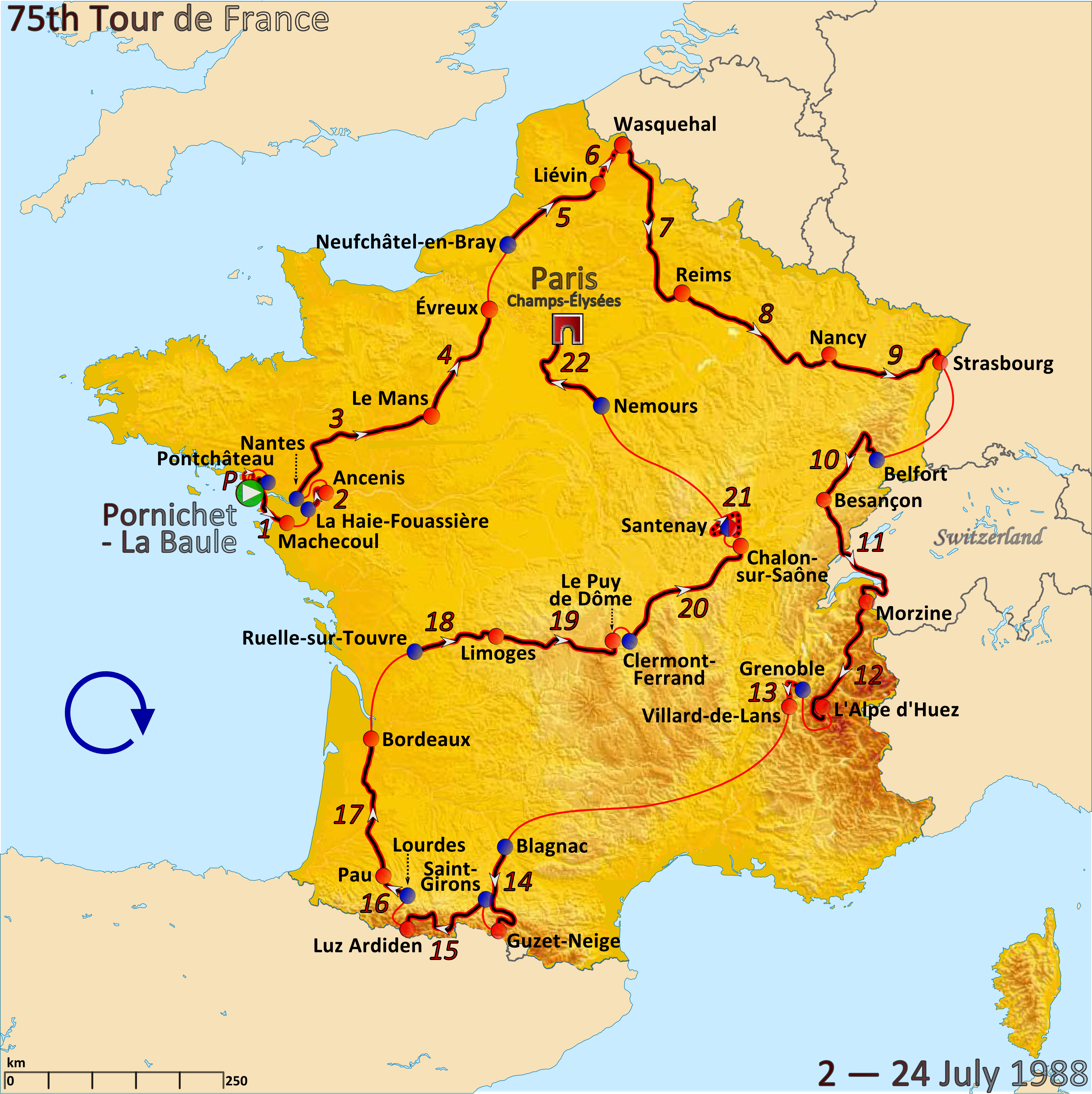
Route of the 1988 Tour de France

The 1988 Tour de France was the 75th edition of Tour de France, one of cycling's Grand Tours. The Tour began in Pontchâteau (stage 1 to Machecoul) on 4 July, and Stage 12 occurred on 14 July with a mountainous stage from Morzine. The race finished on the Champs-Élysées in Paris on 24 July.

== Stage 12 ==
14 July 1988 — Morzine to Alpe d'Huez, 227 km (141.1 mi)

Stage 12 result

Rank	Rider	Team	Time
1	Steven Rooks (NED)	PDM	6h 55' 44"
2	Gert-Jan Theunisse (NED)	PDM	+ 17"
3	Pedro Delgado (ESP)	Reynolds	s.t.
4	Fabio Parra (COL)	Kelme	+ 23"
5	Luis Herrera (COL)	Café de Colombia	+ 1' 06"
6	Thierry Claveyrolat (FRA)	RMO–Liberia–Mavic	+ 2' 31"
7	Steve Bauer (CAN)	Weinmann–La Suisse–SMM Uster	+ 2' 34"
8	Éric Boyer (FRA)	Système U	+ 3' 08"
9	Peter Winnen (NED)	Panasonic–Isostar	s.t.
10	Andrew Hampsten (USA)	7 Eleven–Hoonved	+ 4' 21"

General classification after stage 12

Rank	Rider	Team	Time
1	Pedro Delgado (ESP)	Reynolds	47h 03' 13"
2	Steve Bauer (CAN)	Weinmann–La Suisse–SMM Uster	+ 25"
3	Fabio Parra (COL)	Kelme	+ 1' 20"
4	Steven Rooks (NED)	PDM	+ 1' 38"
5	Luis Herrera (COL)	Café de Colombia	+ 2' 25"
6	Gert-Jan Theunisse (NED)	PDM	+ 3' 55"
7	Peter Winnen (NED)	Panasonic–Isostar	+ 4' 03"
8	Éric Boyer (FRA)	Système U	+ 4' 14"
9	Ronan Pensec (FRA)	Z–Peugeot	+ 6' 01"
10	Andrew Hampsten (USA)	7 Eleven–Hoonved	+ 6' 26"

== Stage 13 ==
15 July 1988 — Grenoble to Villard-de-Lans, 38 km (23.6 mi) (individual time trial)

Stage 13 result

Rank	Rider	Team	Time
1	Pedro Delgado (ESP)	Reynolds	1h 02' 24"
2	Jean-François Bernard (FRA)	Toshiba	+ 44"
3	Steven Rooks (NED)	PDM	+ 1' 09"
4	Erik Breukink (NED)	Panasonic–Isostar	+ 2' 08"
5	Álvaro Pino (ESP)	BH	+ 2' 32"
6	Steve Bauer (CAN)	Weinmann–La Suisse–SMM Uster	+ 2' 37"
7	Jérôme Simon (FRA)	Z–Peugeot	+ 2' 46"
8	Michael Wilson (AUS)	Weinmann–La Suisse–SMM Uster	+ 2' 50"
9	Ronan Pensec (FRA)	Z–Peugeot	+ 2' 54"
10	Jørgen Pedersen (DEN)	BH	+ 2' 55"

General classification after stage 13

Rank	Rider	Team	Time
1	Pedro Delgado (ESP)	Reynolds	48h 05' 37"
2	Steven Rooks (NED)	PDM	+ 2' 47"
3	Steve Bauer (CAN)	Weinmann–La Suisse–SMM Uster	+ 3' 02"
4	Fabio Parra (COL)	Kelme	+ 4' 43"
5	Luis Herrera (COL)	Café de Colombia	+ 6' 21"
6	Gert-Jan Theunisse (NED)	PDM	+ 7' 00"
7	Éric Boyer (FRA)	Système U	+ 8' 05"
8	Ronan Pensec (FRA)	Z–Peugeot	+ 8' 55"
9	Peter Winnen (NED)	Panasonic–Isostar	+ 9' 46"
10	Andrew Hampsten (USA)	7 Eleven–Hoonved	+ 10' 07"

== Stage 14 ==
17 July 1988 — Blagnac to Guzet-Neige, 163 km (101.3 mi)

Stage 14 result

Rank	Rider	Team	Time
1	Massimo Ghirotto (ITA)	Carrera Jeans–Vagabond	4h 30' 34"
2	Robert Millar (GBR)	Fagor	+ 2"
3	Philippe Bouvatier (FRA)	BH	+ 13"
4	Ennio Vanotti (ITA)	Chateau d'Ax	+ 34"
5	Martial Gayant (FRA)	Toshiba	+ 58"
6	Peter Stevenhaagen (NED)	PDM	+ 1' 46"
7	Marc Sergeant (BEL)	Hitachi–Bosal–BCE	+ 1' 49"
8	Frédéric Vichot (FRA)	Weinmann–La Suisse–SMM Uster	+ 2' 20"
9	Jean-Claude Bagot (FRA)	Fagor	+ 2' 26"
10	Dominique Arnaud (FRA)	Reynolds	+ 3' 34"

General classification after stage 14

Rank	Rider	Team	Time
1	Pedro Delgado (ESP)	Reynolds	52h 44' 54"
2	Steven Rooks (NED)	PDM	+ 3' 28"
3	Steve Bauer (CAN)	Weinmann–La Suisse–SMM Uster	+ 3' 54"
4	Fabio Parra (COL)	Kelme	+ 5' 12"
5	Luis Herrera (COL)	Café de Colombia	+ 7' 02"
6	Gert-Jan Theunisse (NED)	PDM	+ 7' 25"
7	Éric Boyer (FRA)	Système U	+ 8' 34"
8	Ronan Pensec (FRA)	Z–Peugeot	+ 9' 59"
9	Peter Winnen (NED)	Panasonic–Isostar	+ 10' 27"
10	Andrew Hampsten (USA)	7 Eleven–Hoonved	+ 11' 02"

== Stage 15 ==
18 July 1988 — Saint-Girons to Luz Ardiden, 187.5 km (116.5 mi)

Stage 15 result

Rank	Rider	Team	Time
1	Laudelino Cubino Gonzalez (ESP)	BH	6h 20' 44"
2	Gilbert Duclos-Lassalle (FRA)	Z–Peugeot	+ 5' 59"
3	Pedro Delgado (ESP)	Reynolds	+ 6' 02"
4	Gert-Jan Theunisse (NED)	PDM	+ 6' 31"
5	Steven Rooks (NED)	PDM	+ 6' 40"
6	Éric Boyer (FRA)	Système U	s.t.
7	Ronan Pensec (FRA)	Z–Peugeot	s.t.
8	Álvaro Pino (ESP)	BH	s.t.
9	Fabio Parra (COL)	Kelme	s.t.
10	Denis Roux (FRA)	Z–Peugeot	+ 7' 03"

General classification after stage 15

Rank	Rider	Team	Time
1	Pedro Delgado (ESP)	Reynolds	59h 11' 40"
2	Steven Rooks (NED)	PDM	+ 4' 06"
3	Fabio Parra (COL)	Kelme	+ 5' 50"
4	Steve Bauer (CAN)	Weinmann–La Suisse–SMM Uster	+ 7' 25"
5	Gert-Jan Theunisse (NED)	PDM	+ 7' 54"
6	Luis Herrera (COL)	Café de Colombia	+ 8' 08"
7	Éric Boyer (FRA)	Système U	+ 9' 12"
8	Ronan Pensec (FRA)	Z–Peugeot	+ 10' 37"
9	Álvaro Pino (ESP)	BH	+ 12' 56"
10	Peter Winnen (NED)	Panasonic–Isostar	+ 13' 58"

== Stage 16 ==
19 July 1988 — Luz Ardiden to Pau, 38 km (24 mi)

Stage 16 result

Rank	Rider	Team	Time
1	Adri van der Poel (NED)	PDM	46' 36"
2	Etienne De Wilde (BEL)	Sigma–Fina–Diamant	s.t.
3	Davis Phinney (USA)	7 Eleven–Hoonved	s.t.
4	Guido Bontempi (ITA)	Carrera Jeans–Vagabond	s.t.
5	Malcolm Elliott (GBR)	Fagor	s.t.
6	Eddy Planckaert (BEL)	ADR–Mini Fiat–IOC	s.t.
7	Søren Lilholt (DEN)	Sigma–Fina–Diamant	s.t.
8	Gert-Jan Theunisse (NED)	PDM	s.t.
9	Andreas Kappes (FRG)	Toshiba	s.t.
10	Stefano Zanatta (ITA)	Chateau d'Ax	s.t.

General classification after stage 16

Rank	Rider	Team	Time
1	Pedro Delgado (ESP)	Reynolds	59h 58' 16"
2	Steven Rooks (NED)	PDM	+ 4' 06"
3	Fabio Parra (COL)	Kelme	+ 6' 00"
4	Steve Bauer (CAN)	Weinmann–La Suisse–SMM Uster	+ 7' 25"
5	Gert-Jan Theunisse (NED)	PDM	+ 7' 54"
6	Luis Herrera (COL)	Café de Colombia	+ 8' 18"
7	Éric Boyer (FRA)	Système U	+ 9' 22"
8	Ronan Pensec (FRA)	Z–Peugeot	+ 10' 37"
9	Álvaro Pino (ESP)	BH	+ 13' 06"
10	Peter Winnen (NED)	Panasonic–Isostar	+ 14' 08"

== Stage 17 ==
19 July 1988 — Pau to Bordeaux, 210 km (130 mi)

Stage 17 result

Rank	Rider	Team	Time
1	Jean-Paul van Poppel (NED)	Superconfex–Yoko–Opel	4h 58' 03"
2	Mathieu Hermans (NED)	Caja Rural–Orbea	s.t.
3	Eddy Planckaert (BEL)	ADR–Mini Fiat–IOC	s.t.
4	Adri van der Poel (NED)	PDM	s.t.
5	Frank Hoste (BEL)	ADR–Mini Fiat–IOC	s.t.
6	Malcolm Elliott (GBR)	Fagor	s.t.
7	Davis Phinney (USA)	7 Eleven–Hoonved	s.t.
8	Stefano Zanatta (ITA)	Chateau d'Ax	s.t.
9	Manuel Jorge Domínguez (ESP)	BH	s.t.
10	Jean-Pierre Heynderickx (BEL)	Sigma–Fina–Diamant	s.t.

General classification after stage 17

Rank	Rider	Team	Time
1	Pedro Delgado (ESP)	Reynolds	64h 56' 19"
2	Steven Rooks (NED)	PDM	+ 4' 06"
3	Fabio Parra (COL)	Kelme	+ 6' 00"
4	Steve Bauer (CAN)	Weinmann–La Suisse–SMM Uster	+ 7' 25"
5	Gert-Jan Theunisse (NED)	PDM	+ 7' 54"
6	Luis Herrera (COL)	Café de Colombia	+ 8' 18"
7	Éric Boyer (FRA)	Système U	+ 9' 22"
8	Ronan Pensec (FRA)	Z–Peugeot	+ 10' 37"
9	Álvaro Pino (ESP)	BH	+ 13' 06"
10	Peter Winnen (NED)	Panasonic–Isostar	+ 14' 08"

== Stage 18 ==
20 July 1988 — Ruelle-sur-Touvre to Limoges, 93.5 km (58.1 mi)

Stage 18 result

Rank	Rider	Team	Time
1	Gianni Bugno (ITA)	Chateau d'Ax	2h 12' 45"
2	Jan Nevens (BEL)	Sigma–Fina–Diamant	+ 1"
3	Martial Gayant (FRA)	Toshiba	+ 44"
4	Mathieu Hermans (NED)	Caja Rural–Orbea	+ 46"
5	Davis Phinney (USA)	7 Eleven–Hoonved	s.t.
6	Gert-Jan Theunisse (NED)	PDM	s.t.
7	Christophe Lavainne (FRA)	Système U	s.t.
8	Iñaki Gastón (ESP)	Kelme	s.t.
9	Eddy Planckaert (BEL)	ADR–Mini Fiat–IOC	s.t.
10	Marc Sergeant (BEL)	Hitachi–Bosal–BCE	s.t.

General classification after stage 18

Rank	Rider	Team	Time
1	Pedro Delgado (ESP)	Reynolds	67h 09' 50"
2	Steven Rooks (NED)	PDM	+ 4' 06"
3	Fabio Parra (COL)	Kelme	+ 6' 00"
4	Steve Bauer (CAN)	Weinmann–La Suisse–SMM Uster	+ 7' 25"
5	Gert-Jan Theunisse (NED)	PDM	+ 8' 04"
6	Luis Herrera (COL)	Café de Colombia	+ 8' 18"
7	Éric Boyer (FRA)	Système U	+ 9' 22"
8	Ronan Pensec (FRA)	Z–Peugeot	+ 10' 37"
9	Álvaro Pino (ESP)	BH	+ 13' 06"
10	Peter Winnen (NED)	Panasonic–Isostar	+ 14' 08"

== Stage 19 ==
21 July 1988 — Limoges to Puy de Dôme, 188 km (117 mi)

Stage 19 result

Rank	Rider	Team	Time
1	Johnny Weltz (DEN)	Fagor	5h 14' 34"
2	Rolf Gölz (FRG)	Superconfex–Yoko–Opel	+ 43"
3	Pedro Delgado (ESP)	Reynolds	+ 5' 25"
4	Gert-Jan Theunisse (NED)	PDM	+ 5' 58"
5	Steven Rooks (NED)	PDM	+ 6' 17"
6	Marino Lejarreta (ESP)	Caja Rural–Orbea	+ 6' 24"
7	Raúl Alcalá (MEX)	7 Eleven–Hoonved	+ 6' 30"
8	Éric Caritoux (FRA)	KAS–Canal 10–Mavic	+ 6' 30"
9	Laudelino Cubino Gonzalez (ESP)	BH	+ 6' 37"
10	Peter Winnen (NED)	Panasonic–Isostar	s.t.

General classification after stage 19

Rank	Rider	Team	Time
1	Pedro Delgado (ESP)	Reynolds	72h 29' 49"
2	Steven Rooks (NED)	PDM	+ 4' 58"
3	Fabio Parra (COL)	Kelme	+ 7' 18"
4	Steve Bauer (CAN)	Weinmann–La Suisse–SMM Uster	+ 9' 48"
5	Éric Boyer (FRA)	Système U	+ 10' 42"
6	Luis Herrera (COL)	Café de Colombia	+ 10' 53"
7	Ronan Pensec (FRA)	Z–Peugeot	+ 12' 03"
8	Álvaro Pino (ESP)	BH	+ 15' 17"
9	Peter Winnen (NED)	Panasonic–Isostar	+ 15' 20"
10	Denis Roux (FRA)	Z–Peugeot	+ 17' 36"

== Stage 20 ==
22 July 1988 — Clermont-Ferrand to Chalon-sur-Saône, 223.5 km (138.9 mi)

Stage 20 result

Rank	Rider	Team	Time
1	Thierry Marie (FRA)	Système U	6h 03' 45"
2	Jean-Paul van Poppel (NED)	Superconfex–Yoko–Opel	+ 2"
3	Jean-Pierre Heynderickx (BEL)	Sigma–Fina–Diamant	s.t.
4	Eddy Planckaert (BEL)	ADR–Mini Fiat–IOC	s.t.
5	Adri van der Poel (NED)	PDM	s.t.
6	Malcolm Elliott (GBR)	Fagor	s.t.
7	Stefano Zanatta (ITA)	Chateau d'Ax	s.t.
8	Davis Phinney (USA)	7 Eleven–Hoonved	s.t.
9	Guido Bontempi (ITA)	Carrera Jeans–Vagabond	s.t.
10	Frédéric Vichot (FRA)	Weinmann–La Suisse–SMM Uster	s.t.

General classification after stage 20

Rank	Rider	Team	Time
1	Pedro Delgado (ESP)	Reynolds	78h 33' 36"
2	Steven Rooks (NED)	PDM	+ 4' 58"
3	Fabio Parra (COL)	Kelme	+ 7' 18"
4	Steve Bauer (CAN)	Weinmann–La Suisse–SMM Uster	+ 9' 48"
5	Éric Boyer (FRA)	Système U	+ 10' 42"
6	Luis Herrera (COL)	Café de Colombia	+ 10' 53"
7	Ronan Pensec (FRA)	Z–Peugeot	+ 12' 03"
8	Álvaro Pino (ESP)	BH	+ 15' 17"
9	Peter Winnen (NED)	Panasonic–Isostar	+ 15' 20"
10	Denis Roux (FRA)	Z–Peugeot	+ 17' 36"

== Stage 21 ==
23 July 1988 — Santenay to Santenay, 46 km (29 mi) (individual time trial)

Stage 21 result

Rank	Rider	Team	Time
1	Juan Martínez Oliver (ESP)	Kelme	1h 02' 37"
2	Tony Rominger (SUI)	Chateau d'Ax	+ 4"
3	Milan Jurčo (CSK)	Chateau d'Ax	+ 5"
4	Pedro Delgado (ESP)	Reynolds	+ 11"
5	Jaanus Kuum (NOR)	ADR–Mini Fiat–IOC	+ 58"
6	Roberto Visentini (ITA)	Carrera Jeans–Vagabond	+ 1' 05"
7	Michael Wilson (AUS)	Weinmann–La Suisse–SMM Uster	+ 1' 27"
8	Sean Yates (GBR)	Fagor	+ 1' 29"
9	Erik Breukink (NED)	Panasonic–Isostar	+ 1' 36"
10	Jesús Blanco Villar (ESP)	Teka	+ 1' 44"

General classification after stage 21

Rank	Rider	Team	Time
1	Pedro Delgado (ESP)	Reynolds	79h 36' 24"
2	Steven Rooks (NED)	PDM	+ 7' 13"
3	Fabio Parra (COL)	Kelme	+ 9' 58"
4	Steve Bauer (CAN)	Weinmann–La Suisse–SMM Uster	+ 12' 15"
5	Éric Boyer (FRA)	Système U	+ 14' 04"
6	Luis Herrera (COL)	Café de Colombia	+ 14' 36"
7	Ronan Pensec (FRA)	Z–Peugeot	+ 16' 52"
8	Álvaro Pino (ESP)	BH	+ 18' 36"
9	Peter Winnen (NED)	Panasonic–Isostar	+ 19' 12"
10	Denis Roux (FRA)	Z–Peugeot	+ 20' 08"

== Stage 22 ==
24 July 1988 — Nemours to Paris Champs-Élysées, 172.5 km (107.2 mi)

Stage 22 result

Rank	Rider	Team	Time
1	Jean-Paul van Poppel (NED)	Superconfex–Yoko–Opel	4h 51' 29"
2	Guido Bontempi (ITA)	Carrera Jeans–Vagabond	s.t.
3	Mathieu Hermans (NED)	Caja Rural–Orbea	s.t.
4	Malcolm Elliott (GBR)	Fagor	s.t.
5	Davis Phinney (USA)	7 Eleven–Hoonved	s.t.
6	Stefano Zanatta (ITA)	Chateau d'Ax	s.t.
7	Philippe Casado (FRA)	Z–Peugeot	s.t.
8	Eddy Planckaert (BEL)	ADR–Mini Fiat–IOC	s.t.
9	Manuel Jorge Domínguez (ESP)	BH	s.t.
10	Dirk Demol (BEL)	ADR–Mini Fiat–IOC	s.t.

General classification after stage 22

Rank	Rider	Team	Time
1	Pedro Delgado (ESP)	Reynolds	84h 27' 53"
2	Steven Rooks (NED)	PDM	+ 7' 13"
3	Fabio Parra (COL)	Kelme	+ 9' 58"
4	Steve Bauer (CAN)	Weinmann–La Suisse–SMM Uster	+ 12' 15"
5	Éric Boyer (FRA)	Système U	+ 14' 04"
6	Luis Herrera (COL)	Café de Colombia	+ 14' 36"
7	Ronan Pensec (FRA)	Z–Peugeot	+ 16' 52"
8	Álvaro Pino (ESP)	BH	+ 18' 36"
9	Peter Winnen (NED)	Panasonic–Isostar	+ 19' 12"
10	Denis Roux (FRA)	Z–Peugeot	+ 20' 08"
