= 1988 Tour de France, Prelude to Stage 11 =

Cycling race stages

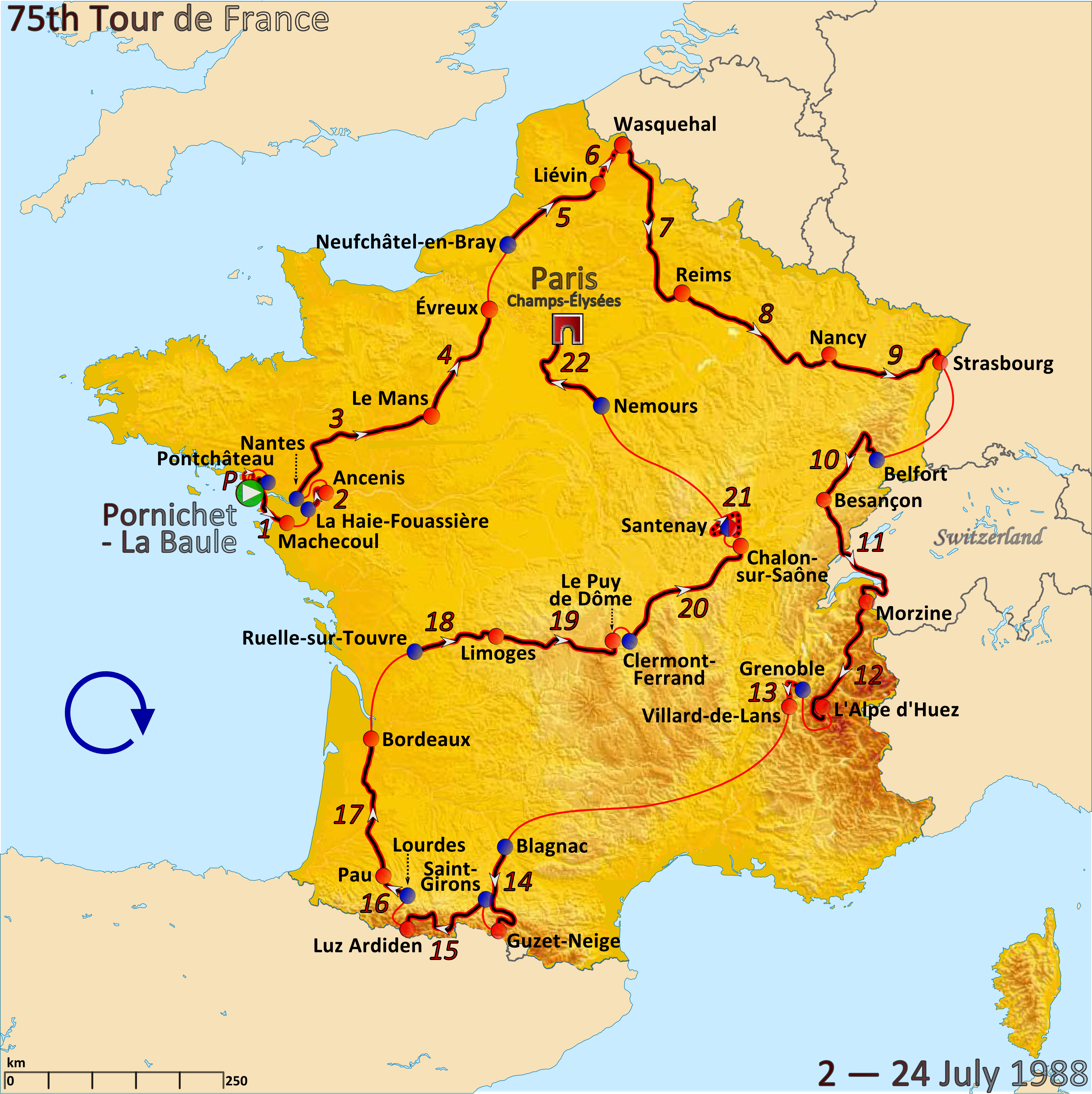
Route of the 1988 Tour de France

The 1988 Tour de France was the 75th edition of Tour de France, one of cycling's Grand Tours. The Tour officially began in Pontchâteau (stage 1 to Machecoul) on 4 July, and Stage 11 occurred on 13 July with a mountainous stage to Morzine. The race finished on the Champs-Élysées in Paris on 24 July.

== Prelude ==
A prelude (also called preface) took place one day before the start of the Tour de France. It was a short unofficial race, mixing team time trial and individual time trial.

3 July 1988 — Pornichet to La Baule, 3.8 km (2.4 mi) (team time trial) and 1 km (0.6 mi) (individual time trial)

Prelude result, unofficial

| Rank | Rider | Team | Time |
|---|---|---|---|
| 1 | Guido Bontempi (ITA) | Carrera Jeans–Vagabond | 1' 14.11" |
| 2 | Peter Stevenhaagen (NED) | PDM | + 1.89" |
| 3 | Jelle Nijdam (NED) | Superconfex–Yoko–Opel | + 2.81" |
| 4 | Etienne De Wilde (BEL) | Sigma–Fina–Diamant | + 3.26" |
| 5 | Gilbert Duclos-Lassalle (FRA) | Z–Peugeot | + 3.58" |
| 6 | Sean Yates (GBR) | Fagor | + 4.65" |
| 7 | Sean Kelly (IRL) | KAS–Canal 10–Mavic | + 5.35" |
| 8 | Gianni Bugno (ITA) | Chateau d'Ax | + 5.55" |
| 9 | Thierry Marie (FRA) | Système U | + 6.39" |
| 10 | Jaime Vilamajó (ESP) | Kelme | + 6.42" |

== Stage 1 ==
4 July 1988 — Pontchâteau to Machecoul, 91.5 km (56.9 mi)

Stage 1 result

| Rank | Rider | Team | Time |
|---|---|---|---|
| 1 | Steve Bauer (CAN) | Weinmann–La Suisse–SMM Uster | 2h 16' 34" |
| 2 | Eric Vanderaerden (BEL) | Panasonic–Isostar | + 8" |
| 3 | Eddy Planckaert (BEL) | ADR–Mini Fiat–IOC | s.t. |
| 4 | Davis Phinney (USA) | 7 Eleven–Hoonved | s.t. |
| 5 | Wiebren Veenstra (NED) | Hitachi–Bosal–BCE | s.t. |
| 6 | Sean Kelly (IRL) | KAS–Canal 10–Mavic | s.t. |
| 7 | Etienne De Wilde (BEL) | Sigma–Fina–Diamant | s.t. |
| 8 | Manuel Jorge Domínguez (ESP) | BH | s.t. |
| 9 | Stefano Zanatta (ITA) | Chateau d'Ax | s.t. |
| 10 | Adri van der Poel (NED) | PDM | s.t. |

General classification after stage 1

| Rank | Rider | Team | Time |
|---|---|---|---|
| 1 | Steve Bauer (CAN) | Weinmann–La Suisse–SMM Uster | 2h 16' 28" |
| 2 | Søren Lilholt (DEN) | Sigma–Fina–Diamant | s.t. |
| 3 | Teun van Vliet (NED) | Panasonic–Isostar | s.t. |
| 4 | Nico Verhoeven (NED) | Superconfex–Yoko–Opel | + 6" |
| 5 | Jean-Pierre Heynderickx (BEL) | Sigma–Fina–Diamant | + 8" |
| 6 | Steven Rooks (NED) | PDM | + 10" |
| 7 | Jelle Nijdam (NED) | Superconfex–Yoko–Opel | s.t. |
| 8 | Guido Bontempi (ITA) | Carrera Jeans–Vagabond | + 12" |
| 9 | Pedro Delgado (ESP) | Reynolds | s.t. |
| 10 | Eric Vanderaerden (BEL) | Panasonic–Isostar | + 14" |

== Stage 2 ==
4 July 1988 — La Haye-Fouassière to Ancenis, 48 km (29.8 mi) (team time trial)

Stage 2 result

| Rank | Team | Time |
|---|---|---|
| 1 | Panasonic–Isostar | 55' 31" |
| 2 | Weinmann–La Suisse–SMM Uster | + 24" |
| 3 | Hitachi–Bosal–BCE | + 36" |
| 4 | Z–Peugeot | s.t. |
| 5 | BH | + 55" |
| 6 | Superconfex–Yoko–Opel | + 1' 01" |
| 7 | Reynolds | + 1' 02" |
| 8 | KAS–Canal 10–Mavic | + 1' 14" |
| 9 | Toshiba | s.t. |
| 10 | Carrera Jeans–Vagabond | + 1' 15" |

General classification after stage 2

| Rank | Rider | Team | Time |
|---|---|---|---|
| 1 | Teun van Vliet (NED) | Panasonic–Isostar | 3h 11' 59" |
| 2 | Eric Vanderaerden (BEL) | Panasonic–Isostar | + 14" |
| 3 | Henk Lubberding (NED) | Panasonic–Isostar | s.t. |
| 4 | Erik Breukink (NED) | Panasonic–Isostar | s.t. |
| 5 | Guy Nulens (BEL) | Panasonic–Isostar | s.t. |
| 6 | Peter Winnen (NED) | Panasonic–Isostar | s.t. |
| 7 | Eric Van Lancker (BEL) | Panasonic–Isostar | s.t. |
| 8 | Theo de Rooij (NED) | Panasonic–Isostar | s.t. |
| 9 | Steve Bauer (CAN) | Weinmann–La Suisse–SMM Uster | + 24" |
| 10 | Frédéric Vichot (FRA) | Weinmann–La Suisse–SMM Uster | + 38" |

== Stage 3 ==
5 July 1988 — Nantes to Le Mans, 213 km (132 mi)

Stage 3 result

| Rank | Rider | Team | Time |
|---|---|---|---|
| 1 | Jean-Paul van Poppel (NED) | Superconfex–Yoko–Opel | 4h 52' 08" |
| 2 | Mathieu Hermans (NED) | Caja Rural–Orbea | s.t. |
| 3 | Eric Vanderaerden (BEL) | Panasonic–Isostar | s.t. |
| 4 | Eddy Planckaert (BEL) | ADR–Mini Fiat–IOC | s.t. |
| 5 | Sean Kelly (IRL) | KAS–Canal 10–Mavic | s.t. |
| 6 | Adri van der Poel (NED) | PDM | s.t. |
| 7 | Etienne De Wilde (BEL) | Sigma–Fina–Diamant | s.t. |
| 8 | Malcolm Elliott (GBR) | Fagor | s.t. |
| 9 | Frédéric Vichot (FRA) | Weinmann–La Suisse–SMM Uster | s.t. |
| 10 | Jean-Philippe Vandenbrande (BEL) | Hitachi–Bosal–BCE | s.t. |

General classification after stage 3

| Rank | Rider | Team | Time |
|---|---|---|---|
| 1 | Teun van Vliet (NED) | Panasonic–Isostar | 8h 02' 59" |
| 2 | Eric Vanderaerden (BEL) | Panasonic–Isostar | + 18" |
| 3 | Henk Lubberding (NED) | Panasonic–Isostar | + 22" |
| 4 | Guy Nulens (BEL) | Panasonic–Isostar | s.t. |
| 5 | Erik Breukink (NED) | Panasonic–Isostar | s.t. |
| 6 | Theo de Rooij (NED) | Panasonic–Isostar | s.t. |
| 7 | Peter Winnen (NED) | Panasonic–Isostar | s.t. |
| 8 | Eric Van Lancker (BEL) | Panasonic–Isostar | s.t. |
| 9 | Steve Bauer (CAN) | Weinmann–La Suisse–SMM Uster | + 32" |
| 10 | Frédéric Vichot (FRA) | Weinmann–La Suisse–SMM Uster | + 46" |

== Stage 4 ==
6 July 1988 — Le Mans to Évreux, 158 km (98 mi)

Stage 4 result

| Rank | Rider | Team | Time |
|---|---|---|---|
| 1 | Acácio da Silva (POR) | KAS–Canal 10–Mavic | 3h 25' 14" |
| 2 | Steven Rooks (NED) | PDM | s.t. |
| 3 | Sean Kelly (IRL) | KAS–Canal 10–Mavic | s.t. |
| 4 | Etienne De Wilde (BEL) | Sigma–Fina–Diamant | s.t. |
| 5 | Eddy Planckaert (BEL) | ADR–Mini Fiat–IOC | s.t. |
| 6 | Mathieu Hermans (NED) | Caja Rural–Orbea | s.t. |
| 7 | Jean-Philippe Vandenbrande (BEL) | Hitachi–Bosal–BCE | s.t. |
| 8 | Henri Abadie (FRA) | Z–Peugeot | s.t. |
| 9 | Iñaki Gastón (ESP) | Kelme | s.t. |
| 10 | Eric Vanderaerden (BEL) | Panasonic–Isostar | s.t. |

General classification after stage 4

| Rank | Rider | Team | Time |
|---|---|---|---|
| 1 | Teun van Vliet (NED) | Panasonic–Isostar | 11h 29' 13" |
| 2 | Eric Vanderaerden (BEL) | Panasonic–Isostar | + 18" |
| 3 | Henk Lubberding (NED) | Panasonic–Isostar | + 22" |
| 4 | Erik Breukink (NED) | Panasonic–Isostar | s.t. |
| 5 | Theo de Rooij (NED) | Panasonic–Isostar | s.t. |
| 6 | Peter Winnen (NED) | Panasonic–Isostar | s.t. |
| 7 | Guy Nulens (BEL) | Panasonic–Isostar | s.t. |
| 8 | Eric Van Lancker (BEL) | Panasonic–Isostar | s.t. |
| 9 | Steve Bauer (CAN) | Weinmann–La Suisse–SMM Uster | + 32" |
| 10 | Frédéric Vichot (FRA) | Weinmann–La Suisse–SMM Uster | + 46" |

== Stage 5 ==
7 July 1988 — Neufchâtel-en-Bray to Liévin, 147.5 km (91.7 mi)

Stage 5 result

| Rank | Rider | Team | Time |
|---|---|---|---|
| 1 | Jelle Nijdam (NED) | Superconfex–Yoko–Opel | 3h 14' 14" |
| 2 | Massimo Ghirotto (ITA) | Carrera Jeans–Vagabond | + 8" |
| 3 | Sean Kelly (IRL) | KAS–Canal 10–Mavic | + 13" |
| 4 | Nico Verhoeven (NED) | Superconfex–Yoko–Opel | s.t. |
| 5 | Henk Lubberding (NED) | Panasonic–Isostar | s.t. |
| 6 | Steve Bauer (CAN) | Weinmann–La Suisse–SMM Uster | s.t. |
| 7 | Jean-Pierre Heynderickx (BEL) | Sigma–Fina–Diamant | s.t. |
| 8 | Steven Rooks (NED) | PDM | s.t. |
| 9 | Ron Kiefel (USA) | 7 Eleven–Hoonved | s.t. |
| 10 | Erik Breukink (NED) | Panasonic–Isostar | s.t. |

General classification after stage 5

| Rank | Rider | Team | Time |
|---|---|---|---|
| 1 | Henk Lubberding (NED) | Panasonic–Isostar | 14h 44' 02" |
| 2 | Erik Breukink (NED) | Panasonic–Isostar | s.t. |
| 3 | Peter Winnen (NED) | Panasonic–Isostar | s.t. |
| 4 | Steve Bauer (CAN) | Weinmann–La Suisse–SMM Uster | + 10" |
| 5 | Eric Vanderaerden (BEL) | Panasonic–Isostar | + 31" |
| 6 | Teun van Vliet (NED) | Panasonic–Isostar | + 38" |
| 7 | Eric Van Lancker (BEL) | Panasonic–Isostar | + 41" |
| 8 | Guy Nulens (BEL) | Panasonic–Isostar | + 43" |
| 9 | Theo de Rooij (NED) | Panasonic–Isostar | s.t. |
| 10 | Jelle Nijdam (NED) | Superconfex–Yoko–Opel | + 44" |

== Stage 6 ==
8 July 1988 — Liévin to Wasquehal, 52 km (32 mi) (individual time trial)

Stage 6 result

| Rank | Rider | Team | Time |
|---|---|---|---|
| 1 | Sean Yates (GBR) | Fagor | 1h 03' 22" |
| 2 | Roberto Visentini (ITA) | Carrera Jeans–Vagabond | + 14" |
| 3 | Tony Rominger (SUI) | Chateau d'Ax | + 23" |
| 4 | Jelle Nijdam (NED) | Superconfex–Yoko–Opel | + 41" |
| 5 | Gerrit Solleveld (NED) | Superconfex–Yoko–Opel | + 49" |
| 6 | Gianni Bugno (ITA) | Chateau d'Ax | + 1' 04" |
| 7 | Milan Jurčo (CSK) | Chateau d'Ax | + 1' 06" |
| 8 | Charly Mottet (FRA) | Système U | + 1' 08" |
| 9 | Jean-François Bernard (FRA) | Toshiba | + 1' 14" |
| 10 | Thierry Marie (FRA) | Système U | + 1' 16" |

General classification after stage 6

| Rank | Rider | Team | Time |
|---|---|---|---|
| 1 | Jelle Nijdam (NED) | Superconfex–Yoko–Opel | 15h 48' 49" |
| 2 | Steve Bauer (CAN) | Weinmann–La Suisse–SMM Uster | + 1" |
| 3 | Erik Breukink (NED) | Panasonic–Isostar | + 21" |
| 4 | Eric Vanderaerden (BEL) | Panasonic–Isostar | + 45" |
| 5 | Jean-François Bernard (FRA) | Toshiba | + 1' 03" |
| 6 | Roberto Visentini (ITA) | Carrera Jeans–Vagabond | + 1' 04" |
| 7 | Charly Mottet (FRA) | Système U | s.t. |
| 8 | Gilbert Duclos-Lassalle (FRA) | Z–Peugeot | + 1' 27" |
| 9 | Frédéric Brun (FRA) | Z–Peugeot | + 1' 30" |
| 10 | Rolf Gölz (FRG) | Superconfex–Yoko–Opel | + 1' 37" |

== Stage 7 ==
9 July 1988 — Wasquehal to Reims, 225.5 km (140.1 mi)

Stage 7 result

| Rank | Rider | Team | Time |
|---|---|---|---|
| 1 | Valerio Tebaldi (ITA) | Chateau d'Ax | 5h 27' 10" |
| 2 | Philippe Casado (FRA) | Z–Peugeot | + 6" |
| 3 | Jean-Paul van Poppel (NED) | Superconfex–Yoko–Opel | + 1' 47" |
| 4 | Eddy Planckaert (BEL) | ADR–Mini Fiat–IOC | s.t. |
| 5 | Sean Kelly (IRL) | KAS–Canal 10–Mavic | s.t. |
| 6 | Adri van der Poel (NED) | PDM | s.t. |
| 7 | Davis Phinney (USA) | 7 Eleven–Hoonved | s.t. |
| 8 | Jean-Philippe Vandenbrande (BEL) | Hitachi–Bosal–BCE | s.t. |
| 9 | Marc Sergeant (BEL) | Hitachi–Bosal–BCE | s.t. |
| 10 | Michel Vermote (BEL) | RMO–Liberia–Mavic | s.t. |

General classification after stage 7

| Rank | Rider | Team | Time |
|---|---|---|---|
| 1 | Jelle Nijdam (NED) | Superconfex–Yoko–Opel | 21h 17' 38" |
| 2 | Steve Bauer (CAN) | Weinmann–La Suisse–SMM Uster | + 9" |
| 3 | Erik Breukink (NED) | Panasonic–Isostar | + 29" |
| 4 | Eric Vanderaerden (BEL) | Panasonic–Isostar | + 50" |
| 5 | Jean-François Bernard (FRA) | Toshiba | + 1' 11" |
| 6 | Roberto Visentini (ITA) | Carrera Jeans–Vagabond | + 1' 12" |
| 7 | Charly Mottet (FRA) | Système U | s.t. |
| 8 | Gilbert Duclos-Lassalle (FRA) | Z–Peugeot | + 1' 35" |
| 9 | Frédéric Brun (FRA) | Z–Peugeot | + 1' 38" |
| 10 | Rolf Gölz (FRG) | Superconfex–Yoko–Opel | + 1' 45" |

== Stage 8 ==
10 July 1988 — Reims to Nancy, 219 km (136 mi)

Stage 8 result

| Rank | Rider | Team | Time |
|---|---|---|---|
| 1 | Rolf Gölz (FRG) | Superconfex–Yoko–Opel | 5h 24' 18" |
| 2 | Etienne De Wilde (FRA) | Sigma–Fina–Diamant | s.t. |
| 3 | Gianni Bugno (ITA) | Chateau d'Ax | s.t. |
| 4 | Sean Kelly (IRL) | KAS–Canal 10–Mavic | s.t. |
| 5 | Raúl Alcalá (MEX) | 7 Eleven–Hoonved | s.t. |
| 6 | Ronan Pensec (FRA) | Z–Peugeot | s.t. |
| 7 | Luis Herrera (COL) | Café de Colombia | s.t. |
| 8 | Pedro Delgado (ESP) | Reynolds | s.t. |
| 9 | Charly Mottet (FRA) | Système U | s.t. |
| 10 | Éric Boyer (FRA) | Système U | s.t. |

General classification after stage 8

| Rank | Rider | Team | Time |
|---|---|---|---|
| 1 | Steve Bauer (CAN) | Weinmann–La Suisse–SMM Uster | 26h 42' 05" |
| 2 | Jelle Nijdam (NED) | Superconfex–Yoko–Opel | + 10" |
| 3 | Erik Breukink (NED) | Panasonic–Isostar | + 43" |
| 4 | Charly Mottet (FRA) | Système U | + 1' 01" |
| 5 | Jean-François Bernard (FRA) | Toshiba | + 1' 02" |
| 6 | Roberto Visentini (ITA) | Carrera Jeans–Vagabond | + 1' 03" |
| 7 | Rolf Gölz (FRG) | Superconfex–Yoko–Opel | + 1' 36" |
| 8 | Sean Kelly (IRL) | KAS–Canal 10–Mavic | + 1' 44" |
| 9 | Gilbert Duclos-Lassalle (FRA) | Z–Peugeot | + 1' 49" |
| 10 | Frédéric Brun (FRA) | Z–Peugeot | + 1' 52" |

== Stage 9 ==
11 July 1988 — Nancy to Strasbourg, 160.5 km (99.7 mi)

Stage 9 result

| Rank | Rider | Team | Time |
|---|---|---|---|
| 1 | Jérôme Simon (FRA) | Z–Peugeot | 3h 47' 31" |
| 2 | Bruno Leali (ITA) | Carrera Jeans–Vagabond | + 7" |
| 3 | Frédéric Vichot (FRA) | Weinmann–La Suisse–SMM Uster | + 9" |
| 4 | Federico Echave (ESP) | BH | + 14" |
| 5 | Éric Caritoux (FRA) | KAS–Canal 10–Mavic | s.t. |
| 6 | Guido Winterberg (SUI) | Weinmann–La Suisse–SMM Uster | s.t. |
| 7 | Peter Winnen (NED) | Panasonic–Isostar | s.t. |
| 8 | Sean Yates (GBR) | Fagor | s.t. |
| 9 | Dominique Garde (FRA) | Système U | + 18" |
| 10 | Sean Kelly (IRL) | KAS–Canal 10–Mavic | + 1' 56" |

General classification after stage 9

| Rank | Rider | Team | Time |
|---|---|---|---|
| 1 | Steve Bauer (CAN) | Weinmann–La Suisse–SMM Uster | 30h 31' 32" |
| 2 | Jérôme Simon (FRA) | Z–Peugeot | + 14" |
| 3 | Erik Breukink (NED) | Panasonic–Isostar | + 43" |
| 4 | Sean Yates (GBR) | Fagor | + 59" |
| 5 | Charly Mottet (FRA) | Système U | + 1' 01" |
| 6 | Jean-François Bernard (FRA) | Toshiba | + 1' 02" |
| 7 | Roberto Visentini (ITA) | Carrera Jeans–Vagabond | + 1' 03" |
| 8 | Frédéric Vichot (FRA) | Weinmann–La Suisse–SMM Uster | + 1' 29" |
| 9 | Sean Kelly (IRL) | KAS–Canal 10–Mavic | + 1' 44" |
| 10 | Gilbert Duclos-Lassalle (FRA) | Z–Peugeot | + 1' 49" |

== Stage 10 ==
12 July 1988 — Belfort to Besançon, 149.5 km (92.9 mi)

Stage 10 result

| Rank | Rider | Team | Time |
|---|---|---|---|
| 1 | Jean-Paul van Poppel (NED) | Superconfex–Yoko–Opel | 3h 28' 31" |
| 2 | Guido Bontempi (ITA) | Carrera Jeans–Vagabond | s.t. |
| 3 | Eddy Planckaert (BEL) | ADR–Mini Fiat–IOC | s.t. |
| 4 | Manuel Jorge Domínguez (ESP) | BH | s.t. |
| 5 | Malcolm Elliott (GBR) | Fagor | s.t. |
| 6 | Davis Phinney (USA) | 7 Eleven–Hoonved | s.t. |
| 7 | Sean Kelly (IRL) | KAS–Canal 10–Mavic | s.t. |
| 8 | Steven Rooks (NED) | PDM | s.t. |
| 9 | Stefano Zanatta (ITA) | Chateau d'Ax | s.t. |
| 10 | Adri van der Poel (NED) | PDM | s.t. |

General classification after stage 10

| Rank | Rider | Team | Time |
|---|---|---|---|
| 1 | Steve Bauer (CAN) | Weinmann–La Suisse–SMM Uster | 34h 00' 03" |
| 2 | Jérôme Simon (FRA) | Z–Peugeot | + 14" |
| 3 | Erik Breukink (NED) | Panasonic–Isostar | + 43" |
| 4 | Sean Yates (GBR) | Fagor | + 59" |
| 5 | Charly Mottet (FRA) | Système U | + 1' 01" |
| 6 | Jean-François Bernard (FRA) | Toshiba | + 1' 02" |
| 7 | Roberto Visentini (ITA) | Carrera Jeans–Vagabond | + 1' 03" |
| 8 | Frédéric Vichot (FRA) | Weinmann–La Suisse–SMM Uster | + 1' 29" |
| 9 | Sean Kelly (IRL) | KAS–Canal 10–Mavic | + 1' 44" |
| 10 | Gilbert Duclos-Lassalle (FRA) | Z–Peugeot | + 1' 49" |

== Stage 11 ==
13 July 1988 — Besançon to Morzine, 232 km (144 mi)

Stage 11 result

| Rank | Rider | Team | Time |
|---|---|---|---|
| 1 | Fabio Parra (COL) | Kelme | 6h 04' 54" |
| 2 | Thierry Claveyrolat (FRA) | RMO–Liberia–Mavic | + 20" |
| 3 | Steven Rooks (NED) | PDM | s.t. |
| 4 | Jérôme Simon (FRA) | Z–Peugeot | s.t. |
| 5 | Gerhard Zadrobilek (AUT) | Weinmann–La Suisse–SMM Uster | + 23" |
| 6 | Raúl Alcalá (MEX) | 7 Eleven–Hoonved | s.t. |
| 7 | Peter Winnen (NED) | Panasonic–Isostar | s.t. |
| 8 | Álvaro Pino (ESP) | BH | s.t. |
| 9 | Claude Criquielion (BEL) | Hitachi–Bosal–BCE | s.t. |
| 10 | Charly Mottet (FRA) | Système U | s.t. |

General classification after stage 11

| Rank | Rider | Team | Time |
|---|---|---|---|
| 1 | Steve Bauer (CAN) | Weinmann–La Suisse–SMM Uster | 40h 05' 20" |
| 2 | Jérôme Simon (FRA) | Z–Peugeot | + 11" |
| 3 | Erik Breukink (NED) | Panasonic–Isostar | + 43" |
| 4 | Charly Mottet (FRA) | Système U | + 1' 01" |
| 5 | Roberto Visentini (ITA) | Carrera Jeans–Vagabond | + 1' 03" |
| 6 | Pedro Delgado (ESP) | Reynolds | + 1' 52" |
| 7 | Claude Criquielion (BEL) | Hitachi–Bosal–BCE | + 2' 03" |
| 8 | Jaanus Kuum (NOR) | ADR–Mini Fiat–IOC | + 2' 43" |
| 9 | Raúl Alcalá (MEX) | 7 Eleven–Hoonved | + 2' 59" |
| 10 | Peter Winnen (NED) | Panasonic–Isostar | + 3' 04" |
