= 1988 Tour de France =

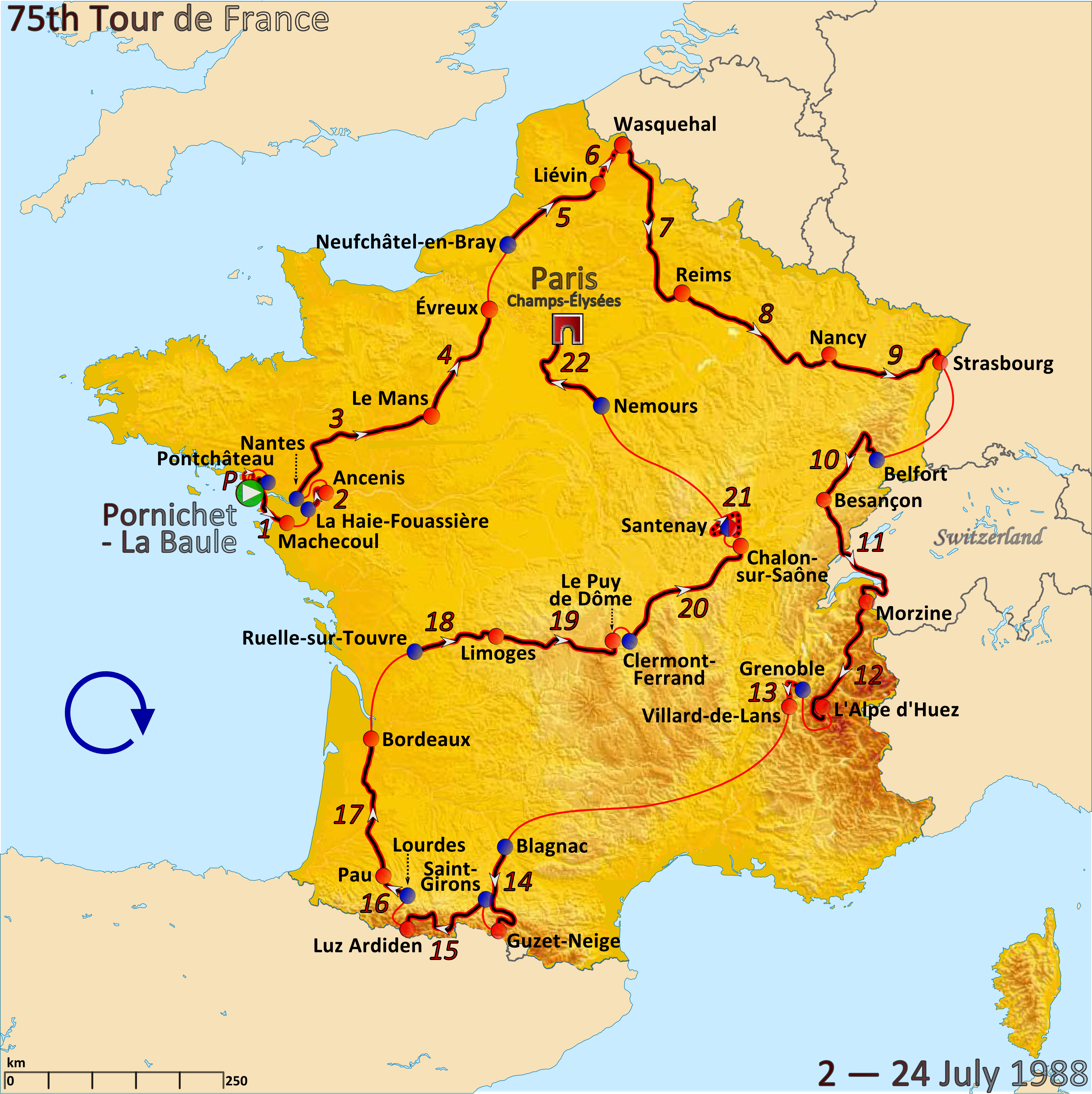
- Route of the 1988 Tour de France

Race details
- Dates: 4–24 July 1988
- Stages: 22
- Distance: 3,286 km (2,042 mi)
- Winning time: 84h 27' 53"

Results
| Jersey awarded to the overall winner | Winner | Pedro Delgado (ESP) | (Reynolds) |
| | Second | Steven Rooks (NED) | (PDM–Ultima–Concorde) |
| | Third | Fabio Parra (COL) | (Kelme) |
| Jersey awarded to the points classification winner | Points | Eddy Planckaert (BEL) | (AD Renting–Anti-M–Bottecchia) |
| Jersey awarded to the mountains classification winner | Mountains | Steven Rooks (NED) | (PDM–Ultima–Concorde) |
| Jersey awarded to the young rider classification winner | Young rider | Erik Breukink (NED) | (Panasonic–Isostar–Colnago–Agu) |
| Jersey awarded to the combination classification winner | Combination | Steven Rooks (NED) | (PDM–Ultima–Concorde) |
| Jersey awarded to the sprints classification winner | Sprints | Frans Maassen (NED) | (Superconfex–Yoko–Opel–Colnago) |
| | Combativity | Jérôme Simon (FRA) | (Z–Peugeot) |
| | Team | PDM–Ultima–Concorde | |
| | Team points | PDM–Ultima–Concorde | |

The 1988 Tour de France was the 75th edition of the Tour de France, taking place from 4 to 24 July. It consisted of 22 stages over 3,286 km (2,042 mi). The race was won by Pedro Delgado with the top three positions at the end of the race being occupied by specialist climbers. This Tour was nearly 1,000 km shorter than the previous few editions, which were over 4,000 km, but by no means easier as it included five consecutive mountain stages including a mountain time trial.

The points classification was won by Eddy Planckaert, while Steven Rooks won the mountains classification and the combination classification. The young rider classification was won by Erik Breukink, and Frans Maassen won the intermediate sprints classification. Both team classifications were won by the PDM team. During the race, Delgado failed a doping test, but because the product was not yet on the doping list from the Union Cycliste International, he was not penalised.

== Teams ==
The UCI had also introduced a rule that limited the number of cyclists in a race to 200. In 1987, the Tour had started with 207 cyclists, so because of this rule, the number of teams in the 1988 Tour was reduced from 23 to 22, of 9 riders, a total of 198. 22 teams were announced two weeks before the Tour. The Tour organisation named three reserve teams, in case one of the 22 teams was unable to start: Postobón–Ryalcao, Roland–Colnago and TVM–Van Schilt.

Of the 198 cyclists starting the race, 42 were riding the Tour de France for the first time. The average age of riders in the race was 27.56 years, ranging from the 21-year-old Jean-Claude Colotti (RMO–Cycles Méral–Mavic) to the 39-year-old Hennie Kuiper (Sigma–Fina). The Caja Rural–Orbea cyclists had the youngest average age while the riders on AD Renting–Anti-M–Bottecchia had the oldest.

The teams entering the race were:

- 7-Eleven–Hoonved
- AD Renting–Anti-M–Bottecchia
- BH
- Café de Colombia
- Caja Rural–Orbea
- Carrera Jeans–Vagabond
- Chateau d'Ax
- Fagor–MBK
- Hitachi–Bosal–B.C.E. Snooker
- Kas–Canal 10
- Kelme
- Panasonic–Isostar–Colnago–Agu
- PDM–Ultima–Concorde
- Reynolds
- RMO–Cycles Méral–Mavic
- Sigma–Fina
- Superconfex–Yoko–Opel–Colnago
- Système U–Gitane
- Teka
- Toshiba–Look
- Weinmann–La Suisse–SMM Uster
- Z–Peugeot

== Pre-race favourites ==
The winner of the 1987 Tour de France, Stephen Roche, was unable to defend his title as he was coming back from knee surgeries. The winner from 1986, Greg LeMond, had still not fully recovered from the hunting accident that caused him to miss the 1987 Tour, and did not start this Tour. Remaining favourites were Pedro Delgado, who had finished in second place in 1987, and Andrew Hampsten, the winner of the 1988 Giro d'Italia, several weeks before the Tour.

== Route and stages ==
The Union Cycliste Internationale (UCI) introduced the rule that a cycling race could not span three weekends. The Tour de France could only start on Monday 4 July, and therefore the usual prologue was removed. The Tour organisers, who were not happy with this restriction, lately had the idea to add to the Tour an unofficial short time trial on sunday 3 July called 'prelude' or 'preface'. Each team would ride for 3.8 kilometres (2.4 mi), and one cyclist per team would then finish one kilometre on his own. Of course, the recorded times of the 'preface' were not used for the Tour, but the cyclist with the fastest time would wear the yellow jersey at the start of the Tour de France (first stage).

The total length of this Tour was 3,286 kilometres (2,042 mi), which was the shortest since 1906. Since 1910, Belgian cyclists had won at least one stage in every Tour, but in 1988 they did not win any stages. There was one rest day, during which the cyclists were transferred from Villard-de-Lans to Blagnac. The highest point of elevation in the race was 2,115 m (6,939 ft) at the summit of the Col du Tourmalet mountain pass on stage 15.

Stage characteristics and winners
| Stage | Date | Course | Distance | Type | Winner |
|---|---|---|---|---|---|
| P | 3 July | Pornichet to La Baule | 3.8 km (2.4 mi) | Team/Individual time trial | Guido Bontempi (ITA) |
| 1 | 4 July | Pontchâteau to Machecoul | 92 km (57 mi) | Plain stage | Steve Bauer (CAN) |
| 2 | 4 July | La Haie-Fouassière to Ancenis | 48 km (30 mi) | Team time trial | (Netherlands) Panasonic–Isostar–Colnago–Agu |
| 3 | 5 July | Nantes to Le Mans | 213 km (132 mi) | Plain stage | Jean-Paul van Poppel (NED) |
| 4 | 6 July | Le Mans to Évreux | 158 km (98 mi) | Plain stage | Acácio da Silva (POR) |
| 5 | 7 July | Neufchâtel-en-Bray to Liévin | 148 km (92 mi) | Plain stage | Jelle Nijdam (NED) |
| 6 | 8 July | Liévin to Wasquehal | 52 km (32 mi) | Individual time trial | Sean Yates (GBR) |
| 7 | 9 July | Wasquehal to Reims | 225 km (140 mi) | Plain stage | Valerio Tebaldi (ITA) |
| 8 | 10 July | Reims to Nancy | 219 km (136 mi) | Plain stage | Rolf Gölz (FRG) |
| 9 | 11 July | Nancy to Strasbourg | 161 km (100 mi) | Hilly stage | Jérôme Simon (FRA) |
| 10 | 12 July | Belfort to Besançon | 149 km (93 mi) | Hilly stage | Jean-Paul van Poppel (NED) |
| 11 | 13 July | Besançon to Morzine | 232 km (144 mi) | Stage with mountain(s) | Fabio Parra (COL) |
| 12 | 14 July | Morzine to Alpe d'Huez | 227 km (141 mi) | Stage with mountain(s) | Steven Rooks (NED) |
| 13 | 15 July | Grenoble to Villard-de-Lans | 38 km (24 mi) | Mountain time trial | Pedro Delgado (ESP) |
| | 16 July | Blagnac | | Rest day | |
| 14 | 17 July | Blagnac to Guzet-Neige | 163 km (101 mi) | Stage with mountain(s) | Massimo Ghirotto (ITA) |
| 15 | 18 July | Saint-Girons to Luz Ardiden | 187 km (116 mi) | Stage with mountain(s) | Laudelino Cubino (ESP) |
| 16 | 19 July | Tarbes to Pau | 35 km (22 mi) | Plain stage | Adri van der Poel (NED) |
| 17 | 19 July | Pau to Bordeaux | 198 km (123 mi) | Plain stage | Jean-Paul van Poppel (NED) |
| 18 | 20 July | Ruelle-sur-Touvre to Limoges | 94 km (58 mi) | Plain stage | Gianni Bugno (ITA) |
| 19 | 21 July | Limoges to Puy-de-Dôme | 188 km (117 mi) | Hilly stage | Johnny Weltz (DEN) |
| 20 | 22 July | Clermont-Ferrand to Chalon-sur-Saône | 223 km (139 mi) | Plain stage | Thierry Marie (FRA) |
| 21 | 23 July | Santenay | 46 km (29 mi) | Individual time trial | Juan Martinéz (ESP) |
| 22 | 24 July | Nemours to Paris (Champs-Élysées) | 173 km (107 mi) | Plain stage | Jean-Paul van Poppel (NED) |
| | Total | | 3,286 km (2,042 mi) | | |

== Race overview ==
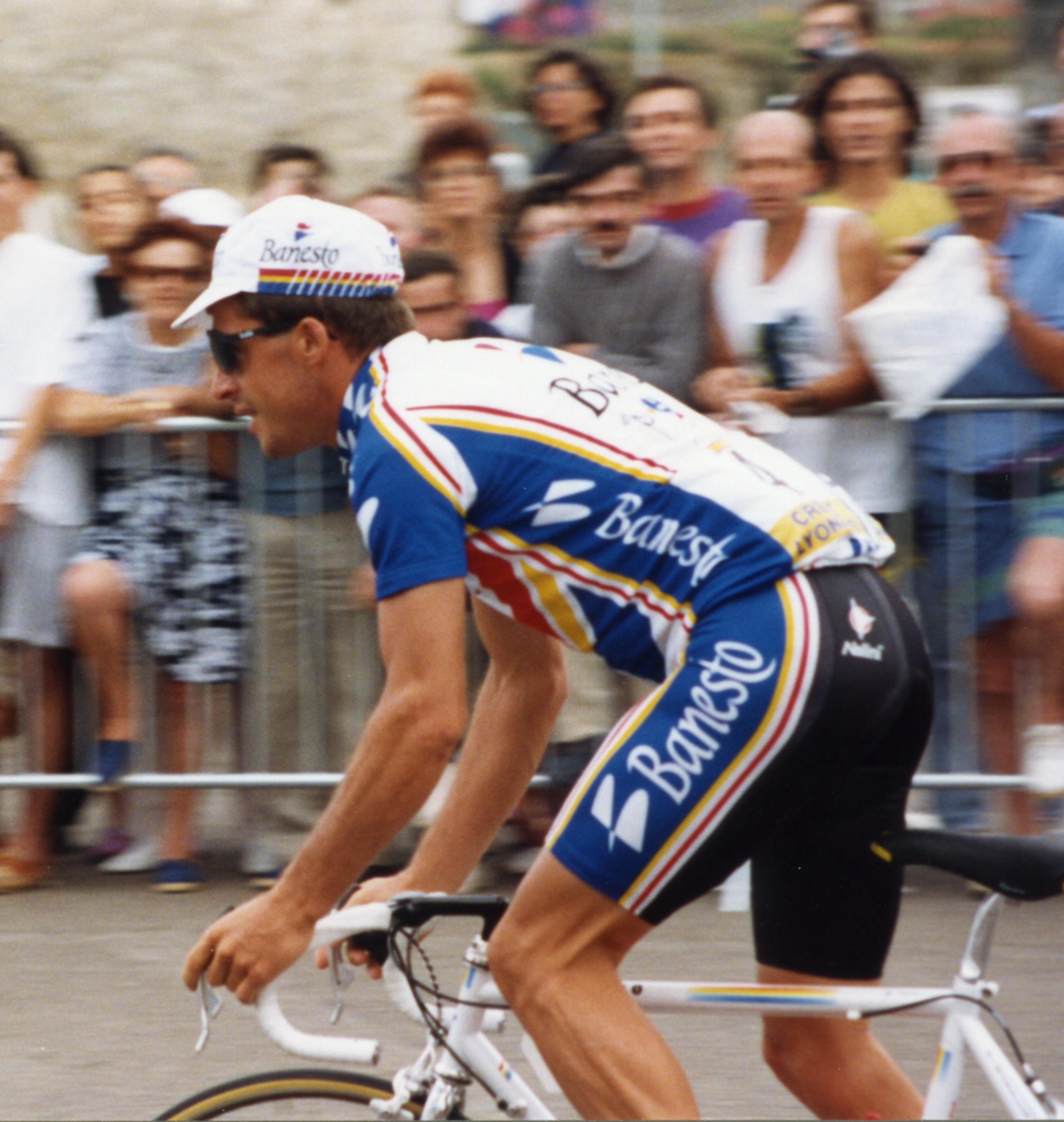
Pedro Delgado (pictured at the 1993 Tour), winner of the general classification

The prelude before the official start was won by Guido Bontempi, and the first real stage was won by Steve Bauer. Bauer lost the lead in the next stage, a Team Time Trial, to Teun van Vliet. The favourites for the overall victory did not lose time in the first stages. The individual time trial of stage six did not change that, although some outsiders (Sean Kelly and Laurent Fignon) lost two minutes.

In the eleventh stage, in hilly conditions, the first serious attacks were seen. Most contenders were able to stay in the main group, but Laurent Fignon and Jean-François Bernard lost a lot of time and were no longer seen as contenders. The twelfth stage included higher climbs. Delgado escaped on the climb of the Glandon, and he was joined by Steven Rooks. On the descent, they were joined by Gert-Jan Theunisse and Fabio Parra; the other cyclists were unable to get to them. Close to the finish, Rooks escaped and won the stage, and Delgado became the new leader of the general classification. Delgado won the next stage, an uphill individual time trial, and solidified his lead.

In the fourteenth stage, the favourites stayed together, and other cyclists were allowed to go for the stage victory. Philippe Bouvatier and Robert Millar, who had led over the previous two cols, were in the uphill sprint to win, until Bouvatier allowed himself to be misdirected by a gendarme 200 metres before the finish (at the point where the team cars were separated from the cyclists) followed by Millar, and the victory went to Massimo Ghirotto. Ghirotto offered his prize (a new car) to Bouvatier though Millar maintained he would have overhauled Bouvatier to win and told CyclingNews in 2010 that "I don't know if the gendarme was to blame, I don't think he was, I know I would have come round Bouvatier in the sprint but then I ought to have dropped him before we got to that stage".

In the fifteenth stage, Delgado increased his lead. He let Laudelino Cubino get away and claim the victory, because Cubino was no threat for the general classification, and finished in third place, gaining time on all his direct competitors. Delgado further increased his lead in the nineteenth stage, by leaving the other cyclists behind him on the final climb of the day. Delgado was aiming to win the twenty-first stage, an individual time trial, and was leading at all the intermediate check points, but lost time in the final part of the stage, finishing in fourth place. This was more than enough to secure the overall victory.

=== Doping ===
During the race, it was announced that doping tests of Pedro Delgado and Gert-Jan Theunisse indicated they had used doping products.

In Delgado's case, it was probenecid. Probenecid was a doping product according to the International Olympic Committee not yet on the doping list of the Union Cycliste Internationale (UCI), so Delgado was not sanctioned, and he remained the winner of the Tour. Tour director Louy tried to convince Delgado to leave the race voluntarily, but Delgado refused. Delgado admits that he took probenecid, but with the intention to assist the kidneys, not to mask anabolic steroids.

Theunisse was found to have a high testosterone-level, which was on the UCI doping list. Theunisse received a penalty of ten minutes, which dropped him from fifth place to eleventh place in the general classification.

One other cyclist was penalised during this Tour: Spanish cyclist Roque de la Cruz failed a doping test after the sixth stage, and was given the same penalty as Theunisse.

In 2013, a notebook from the team doctor of the PDM team showed that all but one of the PDM cyclist were given doping in the 1988 Tour de France.

The owners of the Tour de France thought that director Louy had handled the Delgado affair in the wrong way, and they fired him later that year. They appointed Jean-Marie Leblanc as his replacement.

== Classification leadership and minor prizes ==
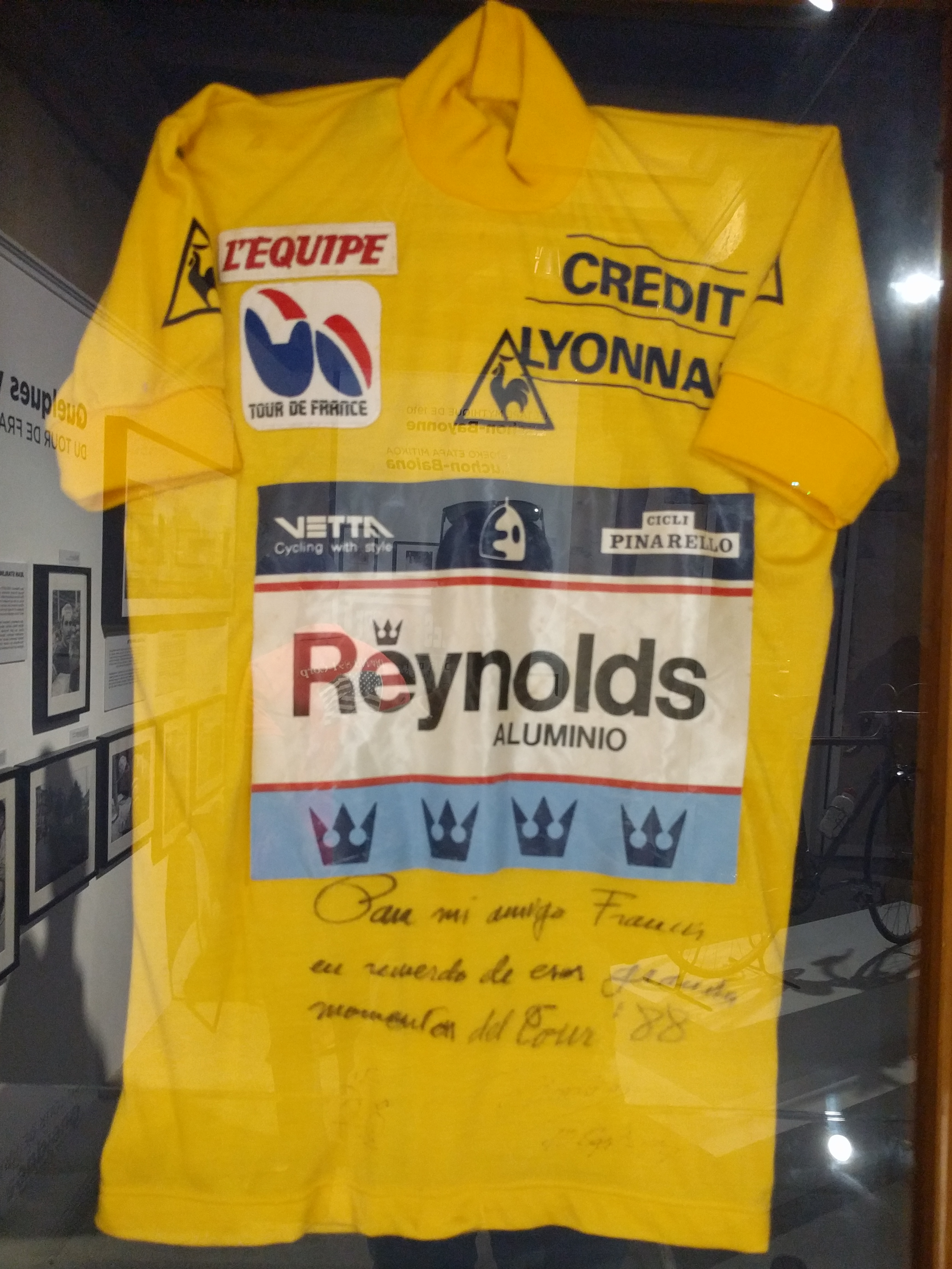
Pedro Delgado's yellow jersey of the 1988 Tour

There were several classifications in the 1988 Tour de France, six of them awarding jerseys to their leaders. The most important was the general classification, calculated by adding each cyclist's finishing times on each stage. The cyclist with the least accumulated time was the race leader, identified by the yellow jersey; the winner of this classification is considered the winner of the Tour.

Additionally, there was a points classification, where cyclists were given points for finishing among the best in a stage finish, or in intermediate sprints. The cyclist with the most points lead the classification, and was identified with a green jersey.

There was also a mountains classification. The organisation had categorised some climbs as either hors catégorie, first, second, third, or fourth-category; points for this classification were won by the first cyclists that reached the top of these climbs first, with more points available for the higher-categorised climbs. The cyclist with the most points lead the classification, and wore a white jersey with red polka dots.

There was also a combination classification. This classification was calculated as a combination of the other classifications, its leader wore the combination jersey.

Another classification was the intermediate sprints classification. This classification had similar rules as the points classification, but only points were awarded on intermediate sprints. Its leader wore a red jersey.

The sixth individual classification was the young rider classification. This was decided the same way as the general classification, but only riders under 25 years were eligible, and the leader wore a white jersey.

For the team classification, the times of the best three cyclists per team on each stage were added; the leading team was the team with the lowest total time. The riders in the team that led this classification were identified by yellow caps. For the last time, there was also a team points classification. Cyclists received points according to their finishing position on each stage, with the first rider receiving one point. The first three finishers of each team had their points combined, and the team with the fewest points led the classification. The riders of the team leading this classification wore green caps.

In addition, there was a combativity award given after each mass-start stage to the cyclist considered most combative. The decision was made by a jury composed of journalists who gave points. The cyclist with the most points from votes in all stages led the combativity classification. Jérôme Simon won this classification, and was given overall the super-combativity award. The Souvenir Henri Desgrange was given in honour of Tour founder Henri Desgrange to the first rider to pass the summit of the Col du Tourmalet on stage 15. This prize was won by Laudelino Cubino.

Classification leadership table
| Stage | Stage winner | General classification | Points classification | Mountains classification | Young rider classification | Combination classification | Intermediate sprints classification | Team classifications | | Combativity award |
| Stage | Stage winner | General classification | Points classification | Mountains classification | Young rider classification | Combination classification | Intermediate sprints classification | By time | By points | Combativity award |
|---|---|---|---|---|---|---|---|---|---|---|
| P | Guido Bontempi (Note: The prelude was an unofficial race, but the winner Bontempi received a yellow jersey, and second-placed Peter Stevenhaagen received the green jersey, to wear at the start of the Tour de France.) | no award | no award | no award | no award | no award | no award | no award | no award | no award |
| 1 | Steve Bauer | Steve Bauer | Steve Bauer | Nico Verhoeven | Wiebren Veenstra | Nico Verhoeven | Søren Lilholt | Weinmann–La Suisse–SMM Uster | Hitachi–Bosal–B.C.E. Snooker | Søren Lilholt |
| 2 | Panasonic–Isostar–Colnago–Agu | Teun van Vliet | Steve Bauer | Nico Verhoeven | Erik Breukink | Teun van Vliet | Teun van Vliet | Panasonic–Isostar–Colnago–Agu | Hitachi–Bosal–B.C.E. Snooker | no award |
| 3 | Jean-Paul van Poppel | Teun van Vliet | Eric Vanderaerden | Nico Verhoeven | Erik Breukink | Teun van Vliet | Teun van Vliet | Panasonic–Isostar–Colnago–Agu | Hitachi–Bosal–B.C.E. Snooker | Roger Ilegems |
| 4 | Acácio da Silva | Teun van Vliet | Eddy Planckaert | Bruno Cornillet | Erik Breukink | Teun van Vliet | Frans Maassen | Panasonic–Isostar–Colnago–Agu | Hitachi–Bosal–B.C.E. Snooker | Stefano Giuliani |
| 5 | Jelle Nijdam | Henk Lubberding | Eddy Planckaert | Bruno Cornillet | Erik Breukink | Frans Maassen | Frans Maassen | Panasonic–Isostar–Colnago–Agu | PDM–Ultima–Concorde | Jérôme Simon |
| 6 | Sean Yates | Jelle Nijdam | Eddy Planckaert | Bruno Cornillet | Erik Breukink | Eric Vanderaerden | Frans Maassen | Superconfex–Yoko–Opel–Colnago | PDM–Ultima–Concorde | no award |
| 7 | Valerio Tebaldi | Jelle Nijdam | Eddy Planckaert | Bruno Cornillet | Erik Breukink | Philippe Casado | Frans Maassen | Panasonic–Isostar–Colnago–Agu | PDM–Ultima–Concorde | Michel Vermote |
| 8 | Rolf Gölz | Steve Bauer | Eddy Planckaert | Bruno Cornillet | Erik Breukink | Philippe Casado | Frans Maassen | Panasonic–Isostar–Colnago–Agu | PDM–Ultima–Concorde | Michel Vermote |
| 9 | Jérôme Simon | Steve Bauer | Eddy Planckaert | Jérôme Simon | Erik Breukink | Frédéric Vichot | Frans Maassen | Weinmann–La Suisse–SMM Uster | PDM–Ultima–Concorde | Federico Echave |
| 10 (Note: In stage 10, 11 and 12, Steven Rooks wore the technicolour jersey.) | Jean-Paul van Poppel | Steve Bauer | Eddy Planckaert | Jérôme Simon | Erik Breukink | Frédéric Vichot | Frans Maassen | Weinmann–La Suisse–SMM Uster | PDM–Ultima–Concorde | Patrice Esnault |
| 11 | Fabio Parra | Steve Bauer | Eddy Planckaert | Jérôme Simon | Erik Breukink | Pascal Simon | Frans Maassen | Weinmann–La Suisse–SMM Uster | PDM–Ultima–Concorde | Ludo Peeters |
| 12 | Steven Rooks | Pedro Delgado | Eddy Planckaert | Steven Rooks | Raúl Alcalá | Steven Rooks | Eddy Planckaert | PDM–Ultima–Concorde | PDM–Ultima–Concorde | Pedro Delgado |
| 13 | Pedro Delgado | Pedro Delgado | Eddy Planckaert | Steven Rooks | Raúl Alcalá | Steven Rooks | Eddy Planckaert | PDM–Ultima–Concorde | PDM–Ultima–Concorde | no award |
| 14 | Massimo Ghirotto | Pedro Delgado | Eddy Planckaert | Steven Rooks | Raúl Alcalá | Steven Rooks | Eddy Planckaert | PDM–Ultima–Concorde | PDM–Ultima–Concorde | Philippe Bouvatier |
| 15 | Laudelino Cubino | Pedro Delgado | Eddy Planckaert | Steven Rooks | Erik Breukink | Steven Rooks | Eddy Planckaert | PDM–Ultima–Concorde | PDM–Ultima–Concorde | Laudelino Cubino |
| 16 | Adri van der Poel | Pedro Delgado | Eddy Planckaert | Steven Rooks | Erik Breukink | Steven Rooks | Eddy Planckaert | PDM–Ultima–Concorde | PDM–Ultima–Concorde | Adri van der Poel |
| 17 | Jean-Paul van Poppel | Pedro Delgado | Eddy Planckaert | Steven Rooks | Erik Breukink | Steven Rooks | Frans Maassen | PDM–Ultima–Concorde | PDM–Ultima–Concorde | Jean-Paul van Poppel |
| 18 | Gianni Bugno | Pedro Delgado | Eddy Planckaert | Steven Rooks | Erik Breukink | Steven Rooks | Frans Maassen | PDM–Ultima–Concorde | PDM–Ultima–Concorde | Gianni Bugno |
| 19 | Johnny Weltz | Pedro Delgado | Eddy Planckaert | Steven Rooks | Erik Breukink | Steven Rooks | Frans Maassen | PDM–Ultima–Concorde | PDM–Ultima–Concorde | Johnny Weltz |
| 20 | Thierry Marie | Pedro Delgado | Eddy Planckaert | Steven Rooks | Erik Breukink | Steven Rooks | Frans Maassen | PDM–Ultima–Concorde | PDM–Ultima–Concorde | Dag Otto Lauritzen |
| 21 | Juan Martinéz | Pedro Delgado | Eddy Planckaert | Steven Rooks | Erik Breukink | Steven Rooks | Frans Maassen | PDM–Ultima–Concorde | PDM–Ultima–Concorde | no award |
| 22 | Jean-Paul van Poppel | Pedro Delgado | Eddy Planckaert | Steven Rooks | Erik Breukink | Steven Rooks | Frans Maassen | PDM–Ultima–Concorde | PDM–Ultima–Concorde | no award |
| Final | | Pedro Delgado | Eddy Planckaert | Steven Rooks | Erik Breukink | Steven Rooks | Frans Maassen | PDM–Ultima–Concorde | PDM–Ultima–Concorde | Jérôme Simon |

== Final standings ==
Legend
| A yellow jersey. | Denotes the winner of the general classification | A green jersey. | Denotes the winner of the points classification |
| A white jersey with red polka dots. | Denotes the winner of the mountains classification | A white jersey. | Denotes the winner of the young rider classification |
| A multi-coloured jersey. | Denotes the winner of the combination classification | A red jersey. | Denotes the winner of the intermediate sprints classification |

=== General classification ===
Final general classification (1–10)
| Rank | Rider | Team | Time |
|---|---|---|---|
| 1 | Pedro Delgado (ESP) | Reynolds | 84h 27' 53" |
| 2 | Steven Rooks (NED) | PDM–Ultima–Concorde | + 7' 13" |
| 3 | Fabio Parra (COL) | Kelme | + 9' 58" |
| 4 | Steve Bauer (CAN) | Weinmann–La Suisse–SMM Uster | + 12' 15" |
| 5 | Éric Boyer (FRA) | Système U–Gitane | + 14' 04" |
| 6 | Luis Herrera (COL) | Café de Colombia | + 14' 36" |
| 7 | Ronan Pensec (FRA) | Z–Peugeot | + 16' 52" |
| 8 | Álvaro Pino (ESP) | BH | + 18' 36" |
| 9 | Peter Winnen (NED) | Panasonic–Isostar–Colnago–Agu | + 19' 12" |
| 10 | Denis Roux (FRA) | Z–Peugeot | + 20' 08" |

Final general classification (11–151)
| Rank | Rider | Team | Time |
|---|---|---|---|
| 11 | Gert-Jan Theunisse (NED) | PDM–Ultima–Concorde | + 22' 46" |
| 12 | Erik Breukink (NED) | Panasonic–Isostar–Colnago–Agu | + 23' 06" |
| 13 | Laudelino Cubino (ESP) | BH | + 23' 46" |
| 14 | Claude Criquielion (BEL) | Hitachi–Bosal–B.C.E. Snooker | + 24' 32" |
| 15 | Andrew Hampsten (USA) | 7-Eleven–Hoonved | + 26' 00" |
| 16 | Marino Lejarreta (ESP) | Caja Rural–Orbea | + 26' 36" |
| 17 | Pascal Simon (FRA) | Système U–Gitane | + 28' 39" |
| 18 | Éric Caritoux (FRA) | Kas–Canal 10 | + 29' 04" |
| 19 | Jérôme Simon (FRA) | Z–Peugeot | + 30' 55" |
| 20 | Raúl Alcalá (MEX) | 7-Eleven–Hoonved | + 31' 14" |
| 21 | Gerhard Zadrobilek (AUT) | Weinmann–La Suisse–SMM Uster | + 32' 09" |
| 22 | Roberto Visentini (ITA) | Carrera Jeans–Vagabond | + 33' 23" |
| 23 | Thierry Claveyrolat (FRA) | RMO–Cycles Méral–Mavic | + 37' 49" |
| 24 | Jaanus Kuum (NOR) | AD Renting–Anti-M–Bottecchia | + 38' 53" |
| 25 | Federico Echave (ESP) | BH | + 39' 17" |
| 26 | Jørgen V. Pedersen (DEN) | BH | + 39' 24" |
| 27 | Jörg Müller (SUI) | PDM–Ultima–Concorde | + 40' 53" |
| 28 | Frédéric Vichot (FRA) | Weinmann–La Suisse–SMM Uster | + 42' 00" |
| 29 | Peter Stevenhaagen (NED) | PDM–Ultima–Concorde | + 45' 27" |
| 30 | Eduardo Chozas (ESP) | Kelme | + 45' 45" |
| 31 | Samuel Cabrera (COL) | Café de Colombia | + 46' 06" |
| 32 | Philippe Bouvatier (FRA) | BH | + 48' 14" |
| 33 | Marc Sergeant (BEL) | Hitachi–Bosal–B.C.E. Snooker | + 49' 24" |
| 34 | Dag Otto Lauritzen (NOR) | 7-Eleven–Hoonved | + 50' 08" |
| 35 | Jesus Blanco (ESP) | Teka | + 55' 28" |
| 36 | Gilbert Duclos-Lassalle (FRA) | Z–Peugeot | + 57' 21" |
| 37 | Jean-Philippe Vandenbrande (BEL) | Hitachi–Bosal–B.C.E. Snooker | + 57' 57" |
| 38 | Guy Nulens (BEL) | Panasonic–Isostar–Colnago–Agu | + 59' 13" |
| 39 | Jean-Claude Bagot (FRA) | Fagor–MBK | + 59' 47" |
| 40 | Charly Berard (FRA) | Fagor–MBK | + 1h 00' 08" |
| 41 | Edgar Corredor (COL) | Café de Colombia | + 1h 01' 20" |
| 42 | Julio-César Cadena (COL) | Café de Colombia | + 1h 01' 28" |
| 43 | Niki Rüttimann (SUI) | Weinmann–La Suisse–SMM Uster | + 1h 01' 43" |
| 44 | Henrie Abadie (FRA) | Z–Peugeot | + 1h 01' 59" |
| 45 | Gerard Veldscholten (NED) | Weinmann–La Suisse–SMM Uster | + 1h 02' 32" |
| 46 | Sean Kelly (IRE) | Kas–Canal 10 | + 1h 02' 54" |
| 47 | Miguel Induráin (ESP) | Reynolds | + 1h 03' 15" |
| 48 | Dominique Arnaud (FRA) | Reynolds | + 1h 07' 31" |
| 49 | Israel Corredor (COL) | Café de Colombia | + 1h 07' 50" |
| 50 | Michael Wilson (AUS) | Weinmann–La Suisse–SMM Uster | + 1h 09' 31" |
| 51 | José Patrocinio Jiménez (COL) | Café de Colombia | + 1h 09' 55" |
| 52 | Jesús Rodríguez (ESP) | Reynolds | + 1h 11' 17" |
| 53 | Jon Unzaga (ESP) | Kas–Canal 10 | + 1h 12' 17" |
| 54 | Johnny Weltz (DEN) | Fagor–MBK | + 1h 12' 49" |
| 55 | Jean-Claude Colotti (FRA) | RMO–Cycles Méral–Mavic | + 1h 15' 00" |
| 56 | Jos Haex (BEL) | Hitachi–Bosal–B.C.E. Snooker | + 1h 15' 16" |
| 57 | Mariano Sánchez Martinez (ESP) | Teka | + 1h 16' 06" |
| 58 | Jean-Claude Leclercq (FRA) | Weinmann–La Suisse–SMM Uster | + 1h 17' 21" |
| 59 | Sean Yates (GBR) | Fagor–MBK | + 1h 17' 25" |
| 60 | Julián Gorospe (ESP) | Reynolds | + 1h 17' 33" |
| 61 | Jan Nevens (BEL) | Sigma–Fina | + 1h 18' 11" |
| 62 | Gianni Bugno (ITA) | Chateau d'Ax | + 1h 19' 09" |
| 63 | Jokin Mújika (ESP) | Caja Rural–Orbea | + 1h 19' 15" |
| 64 | Enrique Aja (ESP) | Teka | + 1h 19' 52" |
| 65 | Philippe Leleu (FRA) | Toshiba–Look | + 1h 21' 51" |
| 66 | Marc Madiot (FRA) | Toshiba–Look | + 1h 22' 34" |
| 67 | Christophe Lavainne (FRA) | Système U–Gitane | + 1h 22' 34" |
| 68 | Toni Rominger (SUI) | Chateau d'Ax | + 1h 23' 41" |
| 69 | Ron Kiefel (USA) | 7-Eleven–Hoonved | + 1h 23' 58" |
| 70 | Roland Le Clerc (FRA) | Caja Rural–Orbea | + 1h 25' 17" |
| 71 | Martial Gayant (FRA) | Toshiba–Look | + 1h 25' 30" |
| 72 | Jacques Decrion (FRA) | Système U–Gitane | + 1h 26' 44" |
| 73 | Marco Antonio León (COL) | Café de Colombia | + 1h 26' 58" |
| 74 | Eric Van Lancker (BEL) | Panasonic–Isostar–Colnago–Agu | + 1h 28' 37" |
| 75 | Vicente Belda (ESP) | Kelme | + 1h 29' 29" |
| 76 | Marc van Orsouw (NED) | PDM–Ultima–Concorde | + 1h 30' 36" |
| 77 | Bruno Leali (ITA) | Carrera Jeans–Vagabond | + 1h 30' 50" |
| 78 | Patrice Esnault (FRA) | RMO–Cycles Méral–Mavic | + 1h 30' 59" |
| 79 | Alessandro Pozzi (ITA) | Chateau d'Ax | + 1h 32' 19" |
| 80 | Dirk De Wolf (BEL) | Hitachi–Bosal–B.C.E. Snooker | + 1h 33' 25" |
| 81 | Frédéric Brun (FRA) | Z–Peugeot | + 1h 33' 32" |
| 82 | Luis Javier Lukin (ESP) | Reynolds | + 1h 34' 00" |
| 83 | Raimund Dietzen (FRG) | Teka | + 1h 34' 25" |
| 84 | Adri van der Poel (NED) | PDM–Ultima–Concorde | + 1h 34' 43" |
| 85 | Massimo Ghirotto (ITA) | Carrera Jeans–Vagabond | + 1h 35' 02" |
| 86 | Ennio Vanotti (ITA) | Chateau d'Ax | + 1h 36' 03" |
| 87 | Rudy Dhaenens (BEL) | PDM–Ultima–Concorde | + 1h 36' 16" |
| 88 | Michel Bibollet (FRA) | RMO–Cycles Méral–Mavic | + 1h 38' 14" |
| 89 | Ludo Peeters (BEL) | Superconfex–Yoko–Opel–Colnago | + 1h 42' 47" |
| 90 | Malcolm Elliott (GBR) | Fagor–MBK | + 1h 44' 27" |
| 91 | Rolf Gölz (FRG) | Superconfex–Yoko–Opel–Colnago | + 1h 44' 47" |
| 92 | Acácio da Silva (POR) | Kas–Canal 10 | + 1h 45' 26" |
| 93 | Dominique Garde (FRA) | Système U–Gitane | + 1h 46' 44" |
| 94 | Régis Clère (FRA) | Teka | + 1h 47' 13" |
| 95 | Hennie Kuiper (NED) | Sigma–Fina | + 1h 49' 37" |
| 96 | Jan Wijnants (BEL) | Hitachi–Bosal–B.C.E. Snooker | + 1h 49' 56" |
| 97 | Arsenio Gonzalez (ESP) | Teka | + 1h 50' 13" |
| 98 | Thierry Marie (FRA) | Système U–Gitane | + 1h 51' 11" |
| 99 | Søren Lilholt (DEN) | Sigma–Fina | + 1h 51' 58" |
| 100 | Dante Rezze (FRA) | RMO–Cycles Méral–Mavic | + 1h 53' 03" |
| 101 | Stefan Morjean (BEL) | Hitachi–Bosal–B.C.E. Snooker | + 1h 54' 56" |
| 102 | Alfons De Wolf (BEL) | AD Renting–Anti-M–Bottecchia | + 1h 55' 56" |
| 103 | Etienne De Wilde (BEL) | Sigma–Fina | + 1h 57' 17" |
| 104 | Roque de la Cruz (ESP) | Caja Rural–Orbea | + 1h 57' 52" |
| 105 | Davis Phinney (USA) | 7-Eleven–Hoonved | + 1h 58' 08" |
| 106 | Guido Bontempi (ITA) | Carrera Jeans–Vagabond | + 1h 59' 07" |
| 107 | Vicente-Juan Ridaura (ESP) | Caja Rural–Orbea | + 2h 01' 31" |
| 108 | Frédéric Garnier (FRA) | Toshiba–Look | + 2h 02' 52" |
| 109 | Marco Bergamo (ITA) | Carrera Jeans–Vagabond | + 2h 05' 43" |
| 110 | Andreas Kappes (FRG) | Toshiba–Look | + 2h 06' 02" |
| 111 | José Salvador Sanchis (ESP) | Caja Rural–Orbea | + 2h 07' 00" |
| 112 | Iñaki Gastón (ESP) | Kelme | + 2h 07' 49" |
| 113 | Jens Veggerby (DEN) | 7-Eleven–Hoonved | + 2h 09' 27" |
| 114 | Javier Murguialday (ESP) | BH | + 2h 09' 32" |
| 115 | Eddy Planckaert (BEL) | AD Renting–Anti-M–Bottecchia | + 2h 09' 34" |
| 116 | Angel Camarillo (ESP) | Teka | + 2h 10' 29" |
| 117 | Celestino Prieto (ESP) | Kas–Canal 10 | + 2h 11' 16" |
| 118 | Herminio Diaz (ESP) | Reynolds | + 2h 11' 42" |
| 119 | Jacques Hanegraaf (NED) | Toshiba–Look | + 2h 12' 11" |
| 120 | Joël Pelier (FRA) | Système U–Gitane | + 2h 13' 28" |
| 121 | Francisco-José Antequera (ESP) | BH | + 2h 13' 55" |
| 122 | Jelle Nijdam (NED) | Superconfex–Yoko–Opel–Colnago | + 2h 15' 59" |
| 123 | Régis Simon (FRA) | RMO–Cycles Méral–Mavic | + 2h 18' 18" |
| 124 | Frank Hoste (BEL) | AD Renting–Anti-M–Bottecchia | + 2h 18' 50" |
| 125 | Alfred Achermann (SUI) | Kas–Canal 10 | + 2h 19' 26" |
| 126 | Frans Maassen (NED) | Superconfex–Yoko–Opel–Colnago | + 2h 19' 43" |
| 127 | Twan Poels (NED) | Superconfex–Yoko–Opel–Colnago | + 2h 20' 02" |
| 128 | Manuel Jorge Domínguez (ESP) | BH | + 2h 20' 59" |
| 129 | Philippe Casado (FRA) | Z–Peugeot | + 2h 21' 31" |
| 130 | Johan Lammerts (NED) | Toshiba–Look | + 2h 23' 17" |
| 131 | René Martens (BEL) | AD Renting–Anti-M–Bottecchia | + 2h 24' 52" |
| 132 | Gerrit Solleveld (NED) | Superconfex–Yoko–Opel–Colnago | + 2h 26' 56" |
| 133 | Michel Vermote (BEL) | RMO–Cycles Méral–Mavic | + 2h 27' 00" |
| 134 | Juan Martinéz (ESP) | Kelme | + 2h 27' 44" |
| 135 | Andy Bishop (USA) | PDM–Ultima–Concorde | + 2h 29' 00" |
| 136 | Erich Mächler (SUI) | Carrera Jeans–Vagabond | + 2h 29' 37" |
| 137 | Rik Van Slycke (BEL) | Sigma–Fina | + 2h 33' 03" |
| 138 | Jean-Paul van Poppel (NED) | Superconfex–Yoko–Opel–Colnago | + 2h 35' 09" |
| 139 | Milan Jurco (TCH) | Chateau d'Ax | + 2h 35' 45" |
| 140 | Hartmut Bölts (FRG) | RMO–Cycles Méral–Mavic | + 2h 36' 26" |
| 141 | Walter Magnago (ITA) | Carrera Jeans–Vagabond | + 2h 37' 52" |
| 142 | Stefano Zanatta (ITA) | Chateau d'Ax | + 2h 38' 23" |
| 143 | Nico Verhoeven (NED) | Superconfex–Yoko–Opel–Colnago | + 2h 42' 20" |
| 144 | Nathan Dahlberg (NZL) | 7-Eleven–Hoonved | + 2h 42' 46" |
| 145 | Gert Jakobs (NED) | Superconfex–Yoko–Opel–Colnago | + 2h 45' 28" |
| 146 | Marco Tabai (ITA) | Carrera Jeans–Vagabond | + 2h 46' 16" |
| 147 | Mathieu Hermans (NED) | Caja Rural–Orbea | + 2h 48' 53" |
| 148 | Jean-Pierre Heynderickx (BEL) | Sigma–Fina | + 2h 54' 07" |
| 149 | Dirk Demol (BEL) | AD Renting–Anti-M–Bottecchia | + 2h 55' 18" |
| 150 | John Talen (NED) | Panasonic–Isostar–Colnago–Agu | + 3h 05' 02" |
| 151 | Dirk Wayenberg (BEL) | AD Renting–Anti-M–Bottecchia | + 3h 28' 41" |

=== Points classification ===
Final points classification (1–10)
| Rank | Rider | Team | Points |
|---|---|---|---|
| 1 | Eddy Planckaert (BEL) | AD Renting–Anti-M–Bottecchia | 278 |
| 2 | Davis Phinney (USA) | 7-Eleven–Hoonved | 193 |
| 3 | Sean Kelly (IRE) | Kas–Canal 10 | 183 |
| 4 | Steven Rooks (NED) | PDM–Ultima–Concorde | 154 |
| 5 | Mathieu Hermans (NED) | Caja Rural–Orbea | 153 |
| 6 | Jean-Paul van Poppel (NED) | Superconfex–Yoko–Opel–Colnago | 141 |
| 7 | Etienne De Wilde (BEL) | Sigma–Fina | 133 |
| 8 | Adri van der Poel (NED) | PDM–Ultima–Concorde | 132 |
| 9 | Manuel Jorge Domínguez (ESP) | BH | 114 |
| 10 | Steve Bauer (CAN) | Weinmann–La Suisse–SMM Uster | 108 |

=== Mountains classification ===
Final mountains classification (1–10)
| Rank | Rider | Team | Points |
|---|---|---|---|
| 1 | Steven Rooks (NED) | PDM–Ultima–Concorde | 326 |
| 2 | Gert-Jan Theunisse (NED) | PDM–Ultima–Concorde | 248 |
| 3 | Pedro Delgado (ESP) | Reynolds | 223 |
| 4 | Ronan Pensec (FRA) | Z–Peugeot | 130 |
| 5 | Jérôme Simon (FRA) | Z–Peugeot | 127 |
| 6 | Fabio Parra (COL) | Kelme | 123 |
| 7 | Laudelino Cubino (ESP) | BH | 101 |
| 8 | Álvaro Pino (ESP) | BH | 98 |
| 9 | Samuel Cabrera (COL) | Café de Colombia | 82 |
| 10 | Luis Herrera (COL) | Café de Colombia | 80 |

=== Young rider classification ===
Final young rider classification (1–10)
| Rank | Rider | Team | Time |
|---|---|---|---|
| 1 | Erik Breukink (NED) | Panasonic–Isostar–Colnago–Agu | 84h 50' 59" |
| 2 | Raúl Alcalá (MEX) | 7-Eleven–Hoonved | + 8' 08" |
| 3 | Jaanus Kuum (NOR) | AD Renting–Anti-M–Bottecchia | + 15' 47" |
| 4 | Peter Stevenhaagen (NED) | PDM–Ultima–Concorde | + 22' 21" |
| 5 | Philippe Bouvatier (FRA) | BH | + 25' 08" |
| 6 | Miguel Induráin (ESP) | Reynolds | + 40' 09" |
| 7 | Gianni Bugno (ITA) | Chateau d'Ax | + 56' 03" |
| 8 | Marc van Orsouw (NED) | PDM–Ultima–Concorde | + 1h 07' 30" |
| 9 | Søren Lilholt (DEN) | Sigma–Fina | + 1h 28' 52" |
| 10 | Jean-Claude Leclercq (FRA) | Weinmann–La Suisse–SMM Uster | + 1h 34' 46" |

=== Combination classification ===
Final combination classification (1–10)
| Rank | Rider | Team | Points |
|---|---|---|---|
| 1 | Steven Rooks (NED) | PDM–Ultima–Concorde | 84 |
| 2 | Gert-Jan Theunisse (NED) | PDM–Ultima–Concorde | 70 |
| 3 | Pedro Delgado (ESP) | Reynolds | 63 |
| 4 | Eddy Planckaert (BEL) | AD Renting–Anti-M–Bottecchia | 49 |
| 5 | Jérôme Simon (FRA) | Z–Peugeot | 47 |
| 6 | Steve Bauer (CAN) | Weinmann–La Suisse–SMM Uster | 47 |
| 7 | Éric Boyer (FRA) | Système U–Gitane | 38 |
| 8 | Frans Maassen (NED) | Superconfex–Yoko–Opel–Colnago | 37 |
| 9 | Johnny Weltz (DEN) | Fagor–MBK | 30 |
| 10 | Frédéric Vichot (FRA) | Weinmann–La Suisse–SMM Uster | 22 |

=== Intermediate sprints classification ===
Final intermediate sprints classification (1–10)
| Rank | Rider | Team | Points |
|---|---|---|---|
| 1 | Frans Maassen (NED) | Superconfex–Yoko–Opel–Colnago | 276 |
| 2 | Eddy Planckaert (BEL) | AD Renting–Anti-M–Bottecchia | 214 |
| 3 | Johnny Weltz (DEN) | Fagor–MBK | 64 |
| 4 | Davis Phinney (USA) | 7-Eleven–Hoonved | 55 |
| 5 | Gert-Jan Theunisse (NED) | PDM–Ultima–Concorde | 50 |
| 6 | Ludo Peeters (BEL) | Superconfex–Yoko–Opel–Colnago | 35 |
| 7 | Jérôme Simon (FRA) | Z–Peugeot | 32 |
| 8 | Dag Otto Lauritzen (NOR) | 7-Eleven–Hoonved | 30 |
| 9 | Martial Gayant (FRA) | Toshiba–Look | 30 |
| 10 | Bruno Leali (ITA) | Carrera Jeans–Vagabond | 30 |

=== Team classification ===
Final team classification (1–10)
| Rank | Team | Time |
|---|---|---|
| 1 | PDM–Ultima–Concorde | 253h 57' 58" |
| 2 | BH | + 12' 32" |
| 3 | Z–Peugeot | + 14' 43" |
| 4 | Weinmann–La Suisse–SMM Uster | + 31' 23" |
| 5 | Système U–Gitane | + 32' 43" |
| 6 | Superconfex–Yoko–Opel–Colnago | + 37' 49" |
| 7 | Café de Colombia | + 44' 31" |
| 8 | Panasonic–Isostar–Colnago–Agu | + 58' 56" |
| 9 | 7-Eleven–Hoonved | + 1h 03' 56" |
| 10 | Hitachi–Bosal–B.C.E. Snooker | + 1h 25 28" |

=== Team points classification ===
Final team points classification (1–10)
| Rank | Team | Points |
|---|---|---|
| 1 | PDM–Ultima–Concorde | 1028 |
| 2 | 7-Eleven–Hoonved | 1713 |
| 3 | Weinmann–La Suisse–SMM Uster | 1737 |
| 4 | Système U–Gitane | 1787 |
| 5 | Z–Peugeot | 1789 |
| 6 | Hitachi–Bosal–B.C.E. Snooker | 2065 |
| 7 | BH | 2197 |
| 8 | Kas–Canal 10 | 2404 |
| 9 | Fagor–MBK | 2482 |
| 10 | Panasonic–Isostar–Colnago–Agu | 2526 |

=== Combativity classification ===
Final combativity classification (1–5)
| Rank | Rider | Team | Points |
|---|---|---|---|
| 1 | Jérôme Simon (FRA) | Z–Peugeot | 38 |
| 2 | Régis Clère (FRA) | Teka | 30 |
| 3 | Johnny Weltz (DEN) | Fagor–MBK | 30 |
| 4 | Pedro Delgado (ESP) | Reynolds | 25 |
| 5 | Rolf Gölz (FRG) | Superconfex–Yoko–Opel–Colnago | 24 |

== Bibliography ==
- Augendre, Jacques (2016). Guide historique [Historical guide] (PDF) (in French). Paris: Amaury Sport Organisation. Archived (PDF) from the original on 17 August 2016.
- Martin, Pierre (1988). Tour 88: The 1988 Tour of Italy and Tour de France. With contributions from: Penazzo, Sergio; Baratino, Dante; Schamps, Daniel; Vos, Cor. Keighley, UK: Kennedy Brothers Publishing. OCLC 19669680.
- McGann, Bill; McGann, Carol (2008). The Story of the Tour de France: 1965–2007. Vol. 2. Indianapolis: Dog Ear Publishing. ISBN 978-1-59858-608-4.
- Nauright, John; Parrish, Charles (2012). Sports Around the World: History, Culture, and Practice. Vol. 2. Santa Barbara, California: ABC-CLIO. ISBN 978-1-59884-300-2.
- van den Akker, Pieter (2018). Tour de France Rules and Statistics: 1903–2018. Self-published. ISBN 978-1-79398-080-9.
