= 1990 La Flèche Wallonne =

Race details
- Dates: 11 April 1990
- Stages: 1
- Distance: 208 km (129.2 mi)
- Winning time: 5h 21' 00"

Results
| | Winner | Moreno Argentin (ITA) | (Ariostea) |
| | Second | Jean-Claude Leclercq (FRA) | (Helvetia–La Suisse) |
| | Third | – | |

The 1990 La Flèche Wallonne was the 54th edition of La Flèche Wallonne cycle race and was held on 11 April 1990. The race started in Spa and finished in Huy. The race was won by Moreno Argentin of the Ariostea team.

== General classification ==
Final general classification

| Rank | Rider | Team | Time |
|---|---|---|---|
| 1 | Moreno Argentin (ITA) | Ariostea | 5h 21' 00" |
| 2 | Jean-Claude Leclercq (FRA) | Helvetia–La Suisse | + 3" |
| ~~3~~ | ~~Gert-Jan Theunisse (NED)~~ | ~~Panasonic–Sportlife~~ | ~~+ 6"~~ (Note: Theunisse was disqualified for doping.) |
| 4 | Miguel Induráin (ESP) | Banesto | + 10" |
| 5 | Steven Rooks (NED) | Panasonic–Sportlife | + 14" |
| 6 | Stephen Roche (IRL) | Histor–Sigma | + 18" |
| 7 | Ron Kiefel (USA) | 7-Eleven | + 22" |
| 8 | Raúl Alcalá (MEX) | PDM–Concorde–Ultima | + 29" |
| 9 | Robert Millar (GBR) | Z–Tomasso | + 37" |
| 10 | Davide Cassani (ITA) | Ariostea | + 45" |
