= Jurčo =

Jurčo is a Slovak family name:

- Matej Jurčo (1984) Slovak road bicycle racer
- Milan Jurčo (1957) Czechoslovak road bicycle racer
- Pavol Jurčo (1986) Slovak footballer
- Tomáš Jurčo (1992) Slovak ice hockey player
