= 1988 Clásica de San Sebastián =

Race details
- Dates: 13 August 1988
- Stages: 1
- Distance: 244 km (151.6 mi)
- Winning time: 6h 09' 36"

Results
	Winner	Gert-Jan Theunisse (NED)	(PDM–Ultima–Concorde)
	Second	Enrique Aja (ESP)	(Teka)
	Third	Steven Rooks (NED)	(PDM–Ultima–Concorde)

The 1988 Clásica de San Sebastián was the 8th edition of the Clásica de San Sebastián cycle race and was held on 13 August 1988. The race started and finished in San Sebastián. The race was won by Gert-Jan Theunisse of the PDM team.

== General classification ==
Final general classification

Rank	Rider	Team	Time
1	Gert-Jan Theunisse (NED)	PDM–Ultima–Concorde	6h 09' 36"
2	Enrique Aja (ESP)	Teka	+ 0"
3	Steven Rooks (NED)	PDM–Ultima–Concorde	+ 6"
4	Marino Lejarreta (ESP)	Caja Rural–Orbea	+ 6"
5	Andreas Kappes (FRG)	Toshiba–Look	+ 37"
6	Miguel Induráin (ESP)	Reynolds	+ 37"
7	Jesús Blanco Villar (ESP)	Teka	+ 37"
8	Raúl Alcalá (MEX)	7-Eleven–Hoonved	+ 37"
9	Ludo Peeters (BEL)	Superconfex–Yoko–Opel–Colnago	+ 37"
10	Michael Wilson (AUS)	Weinmann–La Suisse–SMM Uster	+ 37"
