= Paul Köchli =

Swiss cyclist

Personal information
- Born: April 22, 1947 (age 79) Basel

Cycling career
- Sport: Cycling
- Discipline: Road

Professional teams
- 1967: Tigra-Grammont
- 1969: Frimac-Viva-de Gribaldy

Managerial teams
- 1984-1987: La Vie Claire
- 1988-1992: Weinmann-La Suisse

Paul Köchli is a former bicycle racer and cycling coach from Switzerland, born April 22, 1947, in Basel.

== Biography ==
Köchli became a professional bike racer in 1967, riding for the Swiss Tigra-Grammont team. In 1968, he rode in the Tour de France in the bi-national Swiss/Luxembourgish team. Then, in 1969, he rode in Jean de Gribaldy's team, Frimac-Viva-de Gribaldy.

He was the coach of the La Vie Claire team from 1984 to 1987, having been asked for specifically by Bernard Hinault, with whom he wrote a training book for amateur cyclists. With the La Vie Claire team, he won two Tours de France, thanks to the victories of Bernard Hinault and Greg LeMond.

From 1988 to 1992, he was the head of the Weinmann-La Suisse team, which became Helvetia.
