= 1986 Amstel Gold Race =

Dutch cycling race

The 1986 Amstel Gold Race was the 21st edition of the annual Amstel Gold Race road bicycle race, held on Saturday, April 26, 1986, in the Dutch province of Limburg. The race covered 242 kilometres, from Heerlen to Meerssen. There were 154 competitors, and 51 cyclists finished the race.

== Result ==
Final result (1–10)
Rank	Rider	Time
1	Steven Rooks (NED)	6h 08' 12"
2	Joop Zoetemelk (NED)	s.t.
3	Ronny Van Holen (BEL)	+ 37"
4	Joey McLoughlin (GBR)	+ 37"
5	Teun van Vliet (NED)	+ 37"
6	Adri van der Poel (NED)	+ 37"
7	Francesco Moser (ITA)	+ 37"
8	Marc Sergeant (BEL)	+ 37"
9	Claude Criquielion (BEL)	+ 37"
10	Nico Emonds (BEL)	+ 37"
