= Michael Wilson (cyclist) =

Australian cyclist (born 1960)

Personal information
- Born: 15 January 1960 (age 66) Adelaide, Australia

Cycling career
- Sport: Cycling
- Discipline: Road
- Role: Rider

Professional teams
- 1982–1986: Alfa Lum–Sauber
- 1987: Pepsi-Cola–Alba Cucine
- 1988–1990: Weinmann–La Suisse–SMM Uster

Major wins
- Grand Tours Giro d'Italia 1 individual stage (1982) Vuelta a España 1 individual stage (1983) One-day races and Classics Trofeo Matteotti (1984)

Michael Wilson (born 15 January 1960) is a former Australian racing cyclist. He rode in nine Grand Tours between 1982 and 1989. He also rode in two events at the 1980 Summer Olympics.

Wilson set the fastest time in the amateur Goulburn to Sydney Classic in 1978 run from Goulburn to Liverpool.

== Major results ==
1978
1st Overall The Examiner Tour of the North
1980
1st Flèche d'or (with Jeff Leslie)
1982
1st Memorial Gastone Nencini
1st Stage 2 Giro d'Italia
2nd Giro della Provincia di reggio Calabria
3rd Gran Piemonte
7th Overall Ruota d'Oro
1983
1st Stage 19 Vuelta a España
3rd GP Montelupo
6th Giro del Veneto
9th Giro di Romagna
1984
1st Trofeo Matteotti
2nd Giro dell'Emilia
1985
2nd Trofeo Baracchi (with Daniele Caroli)
7th Giro di Romagna
8th Overall Giro d'Italia
1986
2nd Trofeo Baracchi (with Daniele Caroli)
3rd Rund um den Henninger Turm
1988
2nd Tour du Nord-Ouest
3rd Grand Prix des Nations
8th Overall Tirreno–Adriatico
10th Clásica de San Sebastián
1989
1st Stage 3 Tour de Suisse
4th Grand Prix des Nations
5th Overall Tirreno–Adriatico

1st Stage 3

8th Overall Tour de Romandie
1990
4th Overall Tour de Romandie
7th Coppa Sabatini
7th Grand Prix des Nations
9th Giro di Romagna
10th Tour du Nord-Ouest

=== Grand Tour general classification results timeline ===
Grand Tour	1982	1983	1984	1985	1986	1987	1988	1989
Vuelta a España	—	52	DNF	—	—	—	—	—
Giro d'Italia	43	61	102	8	17	—	—	—
Tour de France	—	—	—	—	—	—	50	69
