= Jean-Claude Leclercq =

French cyclist

Personal information
- Full name: Jean-Claude Leclercq
- Born: 22 July 1962 (age 64) France

Cycling career
- Sport: Cycling
- Discipline: Road
- Role: Rider

Professional teams
- 1984–1985: Skil
- 1986: Kas
- 1987: Toshiba-Look
- 1988–1992: Helvetia-La Suisse
- 1993: Jolly Componibili-Club 88

Major wins
- Single-day races and Classics National Road Race Championships (1985)

Jean-Claude Leclercq (French pronunciation: [ʒɑ̃ klod ləklɛʁ]; born 22 July 1962 in Abbeville) is a French former professional road bicycle racer.

== Major results ==
1984
7th Overall Tour du Limousin

1st Stage 3

1985
1st Road race, National Road Championships
1986
2nd Road race, National Road Championships
2nd La Flèche Wallonne
5th Overall Critérium du Dauphiné Libéré
9th Overall Tour de Suisse

1st Stage 5

1987
1st La Flèche Wallonne
2nd Overall Tour de Romandie
10th Liège–Bastogne–Liège
1988
1st Stage 6 Tour de Suisse
1989
6th Clásica de San Sebastián
1990
Tirreno–Adriatico

1st Stages 3 & 6

2nd Liège–Bastogne–Liège
2nd La Flèche Wallonne
2nd Milano–Torino
3rd Overall Critérium International
6th Amstel Gold Race
1991
1st Chur-Arosa
1st Prologue Tour de Suisse
1st Stage 1 Tour de Romandie
1st Stage 1 Critérium International
1992
1st Stage 4 Critérium du Dauphiné Libéré
