= Jérôme Simon =

French cyclist

Personal information
- Full name: Jérôme Simon
- Born: 5 December 1960 (age 65) Troyes, France

Cycling career
- Sport: Cycling
- Current team: Retired
- Discipline: Road
- Role: Rider

Major wins
- 1 stage 1988 Tour de France

Jérôme Simon (born 5 December 1960 in Troyes) is a French professional road bicycle racer. Jérôme Simon is the brother of cyclists Pascal Simon, François Simon and Régis Simon.

== Major results ==
1988
Briénon
Puy l'Evêque
GP de Cannes
Tour de France:

Winner stage 9
Winner Combativity award

1989
Grand Prix du Midi Libre
1991
Route Adélie de Vitré
