= Philippe Bouvatier =

French cyclist (1964–2023)

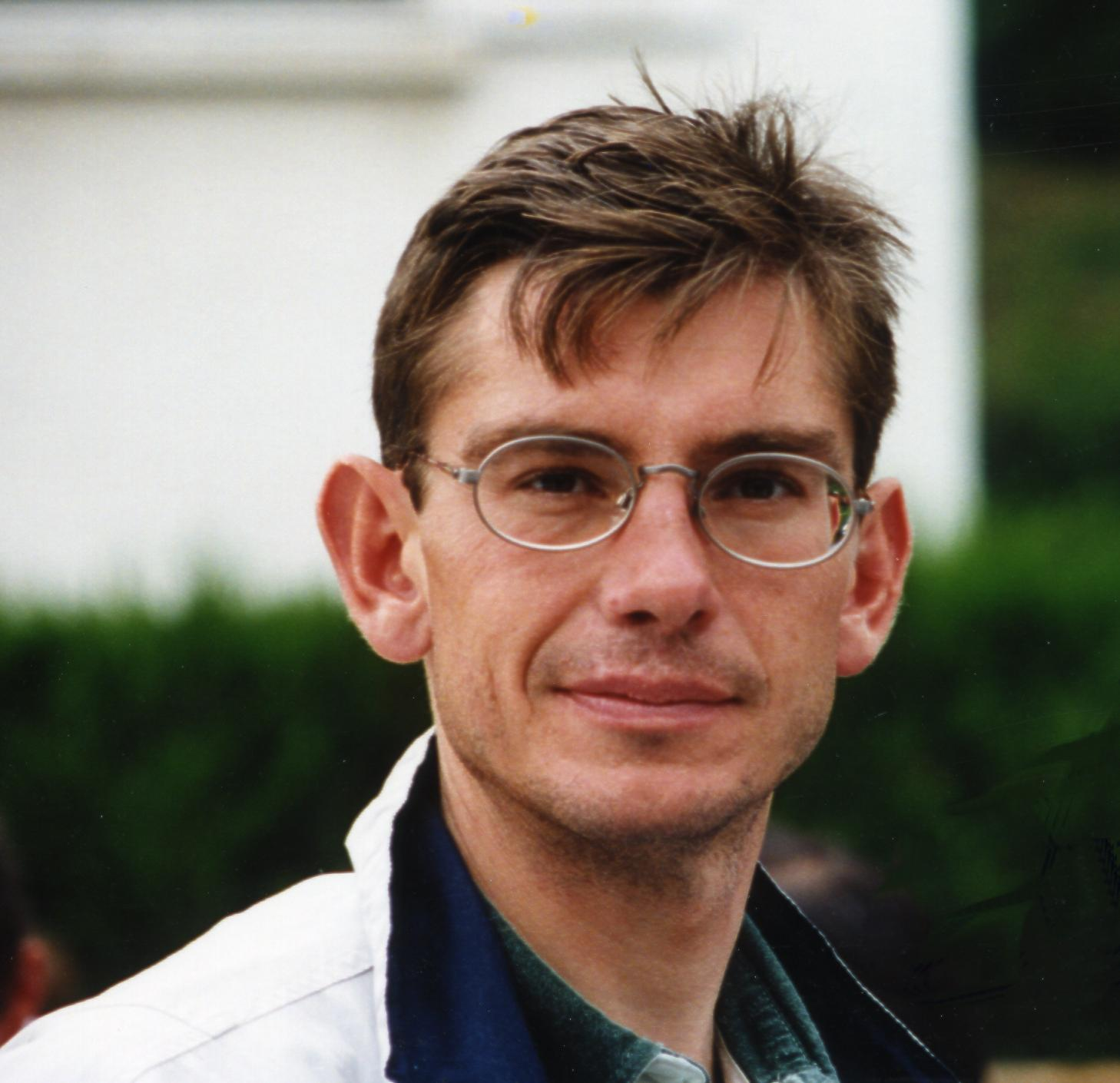

Personal information
- Born: 12 June 1964 Rouen, France
- Died: 7 April 2023 (aged 58) Rouen, France

Cycling career
- Sport: Cycling
- Discipline: Road
- Role: Rider

Professional teams
- 1984–1985: Renault-Elf
- 1986–1989: BH
- 1990–1991: RMO
- 1992–1993: Castorama
- 1994: Aubervilliers '93
- 1995: Le Groupement

Philippe Bouvatier (12 June 1964 – 7 April 2023) was a French professional road bicycle racer. He competed in the team time trial event at the 1984 Summer Olympics.

Bouvatier died from complications of a stroke on 7 April 2023, at the age of 58.

== Major results ==
1981
3rd, Road World Championships, Juniors
1982
1st, Duo Normand (with Bruce Péan)
1st, National Road Championships, Juniors
1984
2nd, Paris–Troyes
3rd, Tour de L'Avenir
1986
Vuelta a Murcia

2nd, Stage 3
2nd, Stage 4a

1988
1st, Duo Normand (with Thierry Marie)
1st, Lisieux Criterium
1st, Polynormande
3rd, Chrono des Herbiers
1990
2nd, Riom
1991
1st, Stage 4, Tour Méditerranéen
1st, Amiens
1992
3rd, Izegem
1994
3rd, Grand Prix d'Isbergues
