= Steven Rooks =

Dutch cyclist (born 1960)

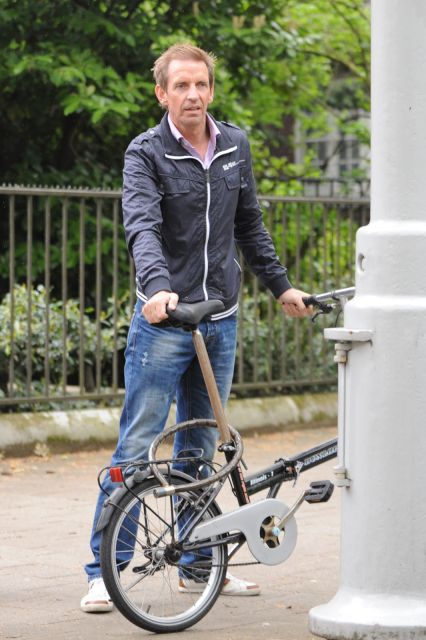
- Rooks in 2010

Personal information
- Full name: Steven Rooks
- Born: 7 August 1960 (age 66) Oterleek, the Netherlands

Cycling career
- Sport: Cycling
- Discipline: Road
- Role: Rider
- Rider type: Climbing specialist

Professional teams
- 1982: TI–Raleigh–Campagnolo
- 1983: Sem–France Loire–Reydel–Mavic
- 1984–1985: Panasonic–Raleigh
- 1986–1989: PDM–Ultima–Concorde
- 1990: Panasonic–Sportlife
- 1991–1992: Buckler–Colnago–Decca
- 1993: Festina–Lotus
- 1994–1995: TVM–Bison Kit

Major wins
- Grand Tours Tour de France Mountains classification (1988) Combination classification (1988, 1989) 2 individual stages (1988, 1989) One-day races and Classics National Road Race Championships (1991, 1994) Liège–Bastogne–Liège (1983) Amstel Gold Race (1986)
Medal record
Men's road bicycle racing
Representing the Netherlands
World Championships
Silver medal – second place	1991 Stuttgart	Elite Men's Road Race

Steven Rooks (born 7 August 1960) is a former Dutch professional road racing cyclist known for his climbing ability. His professional career ran from 1982–1995.

== Career ==
In the 1988 Tour de France, Rooks finished second and won a finish on L’Alpe d’Huez. He won the polka dot jersey for the mountains classification and the Présence Classification (or combination classification). In the 1989 Tour, Rooks won Stage 15, a 39 km mountain top time trial to Orcières-Merlette; he finished seventh that year and again won the Présence Classification, the final year of that award.

Other victories include the 1983 Liège–Bastogne–Liège, the 1986 Tour de Luxembourg and Amstel Gold Race, a stage at the 1987 Tour de Suisse, the 1988 Züri-Metzgete, and 1994 national championship. He finished second at the 1991 World Cycling Championships behind Italy's Gianni Bugno and ahead of Spain's Miguel Indurain.

== Doping confession ==
On the Dutch TV-show Reporter, Rooks admitted with Maarten Ducrot and Peter Winnen to doping. Rooks said he used testosterone and amphetamines during his 13-year career. In 2009, he admitted using EPO after 1989.

== Major results ==
1982
8th Overall Deutschland Tour
10th Overall Volta a Catalunya
1983
1st Liège–Bastogne–Liège
3rd Overall Paris–Nice
3rd Overall Tour Méditerranéen

1st Stage 2b

8th Rund um den Henninger Turm
8th Grand Prix de Monaco
10th Amstel Gold Race
1984
1st Stage 7 (TTT) Ronde van Nederland
2nd Paris–Tours
4th Liège–Bastogne–Liège
5th Rund um den Henninger Turm
5th Grand Prix Impanis
6th Overall Tour de Romandie
9th Overall Paris–Nice

1st Stage 2b (TTT)

10th Overall Tour Méditerranéen
1985
1st Stage 4b Volta a Catalunya
1st Stage 4 Tour of Norway
1st Stage 5b (TTT) Ronde van Nederland
2nd Overall Critérium du Dauphiné Libéré

1st Stage 7

3rd Overall Étoile de Bessèges
6th Binche-Tournai-Binche
8th Paris–Brussels
10th Liège–Bastogne–Liège
1986
1st Overall Vuelta a Andalucía

1st Prologue

1st Overall Tour de Luxembourg
1st Amstel Gold Race
1st Grand Prix de Wallonie
5th Overall Tirreno–Adriatico
5th Liège–Bastogne–Liège
7th La Flèche Wallonne
7th Paris–Brussels
9th Overall Tour de France
9th Overall Setmana Catalana de Ciclisme
1987
1st Stage 2 Tour de Suisse
2nd Overall Tour of Britain
2nd Amstel Gold Race
2nd Omloop Het Volk
6th Road race, UCI Road World Championships
6th Tour of Flanders
9th Overall Tour de Luxembourg
9th Overall Vuelta a Andalucía
1988
1st Züri-Metzgete
2nd Overall Tour de France

1st Mountains classification
1st Combination classification
1st Stage 12

2nd Amstel Gold Race
3rd Milan–San Remo
3rd La Flèche Wallonne
3rd Clásica de San Sebastián
4th Liège–Bastogne–Liège
5th Tour of Flanders
1989
1st Overall Tour du Vaucluse
2nd La Flèche Wallonne
4th Road race, UCI Road World Championships
5th Tre Valli Varesine
6th Liège–Bastogne–Liège
6th Baden-Baden (with Gert-Jan Theunisse)
7th Overall Tour de France

1st Combination classification
1st Stage 15

7th Rund um den Henninger Turm
1990
1st Stage 2 (TTT) Tour de France
2nd Road race, National Road Championships
2nd Overall Settimana Internazionale di Coppi e Bartali
3rd Liège–Bastogne–Liège
4th Overall Ronde van Nederland
5th La Flèche Wallonne
1991
1st Road race, National Road Championships
2nd Road race, UCI Road World Championships
2nd Overall Volta a la Comunitat Valenciana
6th Wincanton Classic
9th Overall Vuelta a España
1992
2nd Liège–Bastogne–Liège
5th Road race, UCI Road World Championships
5th Overall Tour of Galicia

1st Stage 4

7th Wincanton Classic
8th La Flèche Wallonne
10th Overall Vuelta a España
10th Overall Tour of the Basque Country
1993
2nd Road race, National Road Championships
4th Brabantse Pijl
9th Veenendaal–Veenendaal
10th Liège–Bastogne–Liège
1994
1st Road race, National Road Championships
6th Amstel Gold Race
1995
8th Amstel Gold Race

=== Grand Tour general classification results timeline ===
Grand Tour	1983	1984	1985	1986	1987	1988	1989	1990	1991	1992	1993	1994	1995
Vuelta a España	—	—	DNF	—	—	—	—	—	9	10	—	—	—
Giro d'Italia	—	—	—	—	—	DNF	—	75	—	—	DNF	—	DNF
Tour de France	DNF	—	25	9	DNF	2	7	33	26	17	DNF	DNF	—

Legend
—	Did not compete
DNF	Did not finish

== Honors ==
- In 1988, Rooks was Dutch Sportsman of the year.
- Since 2004, Maastricht, the Steven Rooks Classic, an amateur race, is organised in his honor.

== See also ==
- List of doping cases in cycling
- Jean de Gribaldy

Awards
Preceded by Ruud Gullit	Dutch Sportsman of the Year; 1988	Succeeded by Leo Visser
Sporting positions
Preceded by Peter Winnen; Erik Breukink	Dutch National Road Race Champion; 1991; 1994	Succeeded by Tristan Hoffman; Servais Knaven
