= Jaanus Kuum =

Estonian-Norwegian cyclist

Personal information
- Born: 2 October 1964 Tallinn, then part of Estonian SSR, Soviet Union
- Died: 26 August 1998 (aged 33) Oslo, Norway

Cycling career
- Sport: Cycling
- Discipline: Road
- Role: Rider

Professional teams
- 1986–1987: La Vie Claire
- 1988–1989: AD Renting–Mini-Flat–Enerday
- 1990: Teka
- 1991: TVM–Sanyo
- 1992: Subaru–Montgomery
- 1993: Trident
- 1994: Carrera Jeans–Tassoni

Jaanus Kuum (2 October 1964 – 26 August 1998) was an Estonian-Norwegian racing cyclist. He began cycling exercises in 1978 under the guidance of Helvi and Rein Roos. From 1983 to 1984, he competed four times in trekking and road training as an Estonian champion. In 1984, he moved from Estonia to Norway. He rode in four Grand Tours between 1986 and 1989.

Kuum died at age 33 in Oslo and was interred at Rahumäe cemetery in Tallinn.

== Major results ==
1986
1st National Time Trial Championships
2nd Coppa Sabatini
5th Overall Coors Classic
1988
2nd Overall Tour de Luxembourg
3rd Grand Prix Eddy Merckx
3rd Overall Vuelta a Aragón
3rd Overall Vuelta a Asturias
4th Overall Vuelta a los Valles Mineros

1st Stage 1

9th Road race, World Road Championships
10th Overall Paris–Nice
10th Philadelphia Classic
1989
2nd Overall Vuelta a Asturias
8th Paris–Bruxelles
1990
2nd National Time Trial Championships
6th Overall Euskal Bizikleta
9th Overall Vuelta al Pais Vasco

== In popular culture ==
Jaanus Kuum was portrayed in 2026 biographical film, Our Erika, co-written and directed by German Golub. In the film, Kumm was played by the Estonian actor Pääru Oja.
