= Stefano Zanatta =

Italian cyclist

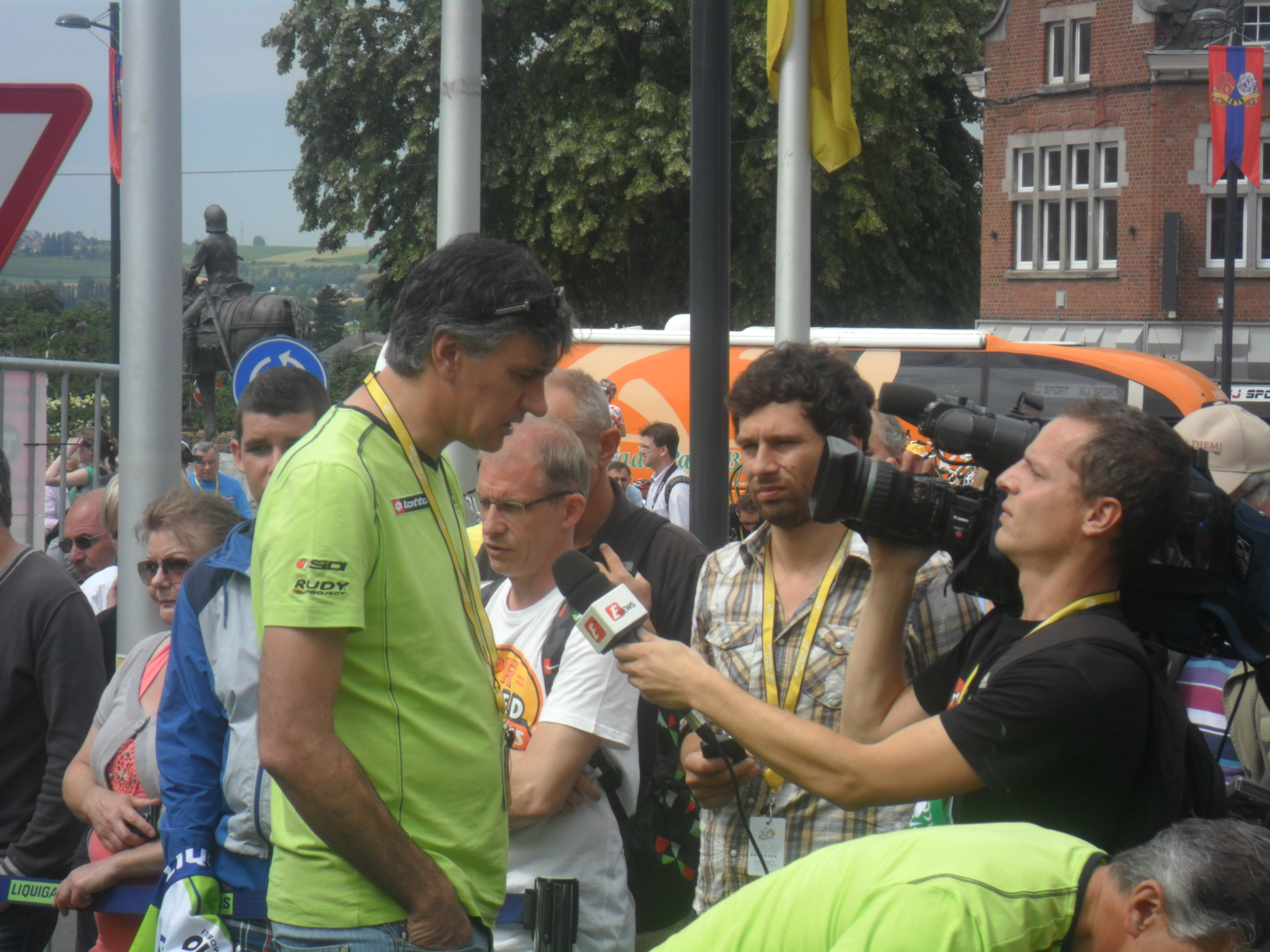
- Zanatta being interviewed as DS of team Liquigas at the 2012 Tour de France

Personal information
- Born: 28 January 1964 (age 62) Treviso, Italy

Cycling career
- Sport: Cycling
- Role: Rider

Stefano Zanatta (born 28 January 1964) is a former Italian racing cyclist. He rode in fourteen Grand Tours between 1986 and 1995.
