= Milan Jurčo =

Slovak cyclist

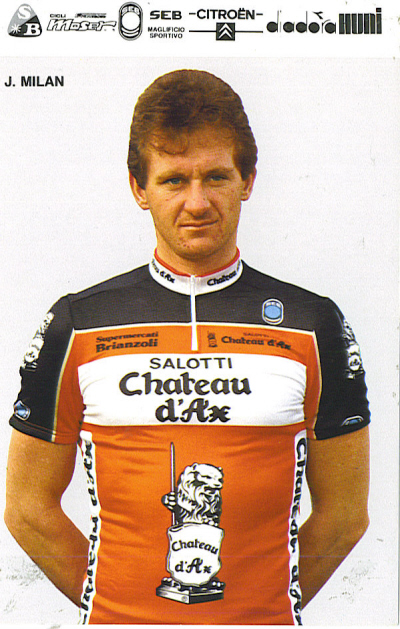

Personal information
- Born: 14 September 1957 (age 69) Liptovský Mikuláš, Czechoslovakia

Cycling career
- Sport: Cycling
- Discipline: Road
- Role: Rider

Amateur team
- 1975–1986: Inter Bratislava

Professional teams
- 1987–1989: Supermercati Brianzoli–Chateau d'Ax
- 1990–1991: Varta–ELK Haus–NÖ

Milan Jurčo (born 14 September 1957) is a Slovak former professional road bicycle racer who competed for Czechoslovakia. He is the father of Matej Jurčo, who is also professional cyclist.

== Major results ==
1979
1st Brno-Velká Bíteš-Brno
1st Stage 8 Vuelta a Cuba
1980
1st Stage 3 Okolo Slovenska
1981
1st Overall Tour of Scotland

1st Stages 3, 4 & 5

1st Stage 6 Giro delle Regioni
3rd Team time trial, UCI Road World Championships
4th Gran Premio della Liberazione
1982
1st Overall Circuit des Ardennes

1st Stage 1

1st Brno-Velká Bíteš-Brno
1st Stage 4 Tour de Luxembourg
2nd Overall Circuit de la Sarthe
2nd Road race, National Road Championships
1984
1st Overall Rheinland-Pfalz Rundfahrt
1st Prologue Girobio
3rd Team time trial, Friendship Games
1985
2nd Team time trial, UCI Road World Championships
3rd Gran Premio della Liberazione
1986
1st Stages 3 & 5 Settimana Ciclistica Bergamasca
1987
1st Prologue Giro di Puglia
1990
8th GP Stad Zottegem
