= Helvetia–La Suisse =

Team information
- UCI code: HEL
- Registered: Switzerland
- Founded: 1988
- Disbanded: 1992
- Discipline: Road

Key personnel
- General manager: Paul Köchli

Team name history
- 1988 1989–1991 1992 1992: Weinmann–La Suisse–SMM Uster; Helvetia–La Suisse; Helvetia–Fichtel & Sachs; Helvetia–Commodore

Helvetia–La Suisse (UCI team code: HEL) was a Swiss professional cycling team that existed from 1988 to 1992. Gilles Delion won the one-day race Giro di Lombardia with the team.

== Notable riders ==
Name	Born	Nationality	Previous	Enter	Left	Afterwards
John Baldi	1966	Italy	Fibok	1988	1990	Controlfida
Steve Bauer	1959	Canada	La Vie Claire	1988	1989	7-Eleven
Gilles Delion	1966	France	amateur	1988	1992	Castorama
Serge Demierre	1956	Switzerland	Fibok	1988	1991	retired
Laurent Dufaux	1969	Switzerland	amateur	1991	1992	ONCE
Mauro Gianetti	1964	Switzerland	Paini-Bottecchia	1988	1991	Festina
Othmar Häfliger	1963	Switzerland	La Vie Claire	1988	1990	retired
Jean-Claude Leclercq	1962	France	La Vie Claire	1988	1992	Jolly
Henri Manders	1960	Netherlands	PDM	1989	1992	retired
Pascal Richard	1964	Switzerland	La Vie Claire	1988	1991	Festina
Niki Rüttimann	1962	Switzerland	La Vie Claire	1988	1990	retired
Peter Stevenhaagen	1965	Netherlands	PDM	1989	1992	retired
Gerard Veldscholten	1965	Netherlands	PDM	1989	1990	Team Telekom
Frédéric Vichot	1959	France	KAS	1988	1992	Castorama
Michael Wilson	1960	Australia	individual	1988	1990	Ariostea
Guido Winterberg	1962	Switzerland	La Vie Claire	1988	1992	retired
