= List of teams and cyclists in the 1991 Tour de France =

List of cyclists

The 1991 Tour de France started with 198 cyclists, divided into 22 teams of 9 cyclists. Sixteen teams qualified by being ranked in the top 16 of the FICP ranking for teams in May 1991:

== Teams ==
Qualified teams

- Z
- Carrera Jeans–Tassoni
- PDM–Concorde–Ultima
- Banesto
- ONCE
- Chateau d'Ax–Gatorade
- Lotto
- Motorola
- Helvetia–La Suisse
- Ariostea
- RMO
- Weinmann–Eddy Merckx
- Histor–Sigma
- Toshiba
- Buckler–Colnago–Decca
- CLAS–Cajastur

Invited teams

- Amaya Seguros
- Castorama–Raleigh
- Postobón–Manzana–Ryalcao
- TVM–Sanyo
- Panasonic–Sportlife
- Tonton Tapis–GB

== Cyclists ==
=== By starting number ===
Legend
No.	Starting number worn by the rider during the Tour
Pos.	Position in the general classification
DNF	Denotes a rider who did not finish

No.	Name	Nationality	Team	Pos.	Ref
1	Greg LeMond	United States	Z	7	
2	Éric Boyer	France	Z	38	
3	Philippe Casado	France	Z	87	
4	Bruno Cornillet	France	Z	54	
5	Gilbert Duclos-Lassalle	France	Z	60	
6	Atle Kvålsvoll	Norway	Z	DNF	
7	François Lemarchand	France	Z	101	
8	Robert Millar	Great Britain	Z	72	
9	Jérôme Simon	France	Z	23	
11	Claudio Chiappucci	Italy	Carrera Jeans–Tassoni	3	
12	Djamolidine Abdoujaparov	Soviet Union	Carrera Jeans–Tassoni	85	
13	Guido Bontempi	Italy	Carrera Jeans–Tassoni	96	
14	Alessandro Gianelli	Italy	Carrera Jeans–Tassoni	40	
15	Erich Maechler	Switzerland	Carrera Jeans–Tassoni	128	
16	Jure Pavlič	Slovenia	Carrera Jeans–Tassoni	134	
17	Giancarlo Perini	Italy	Carrera Jeans–Tassoni	120	
18	Vladimir Poulnikov	Soviet Union	Carrera Jeans–Tassoni	88	
19	Enrico Zaina	Italy	Carrera Jeans–Tassoni	93	
21	Erik Breukink	Netherlands	PDM–Concorde–Ultima	DNF	
22	Raúl Alcalá	Mexico	PDM–Concorde–Ultima	DNF	
23	Falk Boden	Germany	PDM–Concorde–Ultima	DNF	
24	Martin Earley	Ireland	PDM–Concorde–Ultima	DNF	
25	Sean Kelly	Ireland	PDM–Concorde–Ultima	DNF	
26	Uwe Raab	Germany	PDM–Concorde–Ultima	DNF	
27	Jos van Aert	Netherlands	PDM–Concorde–Ultima	DNF	
28	Jean-Paul van Poppel	Netherlands	PDM–Concorde–Ultima	DNF	
29	Nico Verhoeven	Netherlands	PDM–Concorde–Ultima	DNF	
31	Pedro Delgado	Spain	Banesto	9	
32	Marino Alonso	Spain	Banesto	123	
33	Dominique Arnaud	France	Banesto	77	
34	Jean-François Bernard	France	Banesto	14	
35	Miguel Indurain	Spain	Banesto	1	
36	Luis Javier Lukin	Spain	Banesto	119	
37	Fabrice Philipot	France	Banesto	24	
38	Jesús Rodríguez Magro	Spain	Banesto	100	
39	Abelardo Rondón	Colombia	Banesto	12	
41	Marino Lejarreta	Spain	ONCE	53	
42	Eduardo Chozas Olmo	Spain	ONCE	11	
43	Herminio Díaz Zabala	Spain	ONCE	75	
44	Anselmo Fuerte	Spain	ONCE	37	
45	Stephen Hodge	Australia	ONCE	67	
46	Miguel Ángel Martínez Torres	Spain	ONCE	76	
47	Melcior Mauri	Spain	ONCE	64	
48	José Luis Villanueva Orihuela	Spain	ONCE	DNF	
49	Johnny Weltz	Denmark	ONCE	DNF	
51	Gianni Bugno	Italy	Chateau d'Ax–Gatorade	2	
52	Giuseppe Calcaterra	Italy	Chateau d'Ax–Gatorade	149	
53	Marco Giovannetti	Italy	Chateau d'Ax–Gatorade	30	
54	Roberto Gusmeroli	Italy	Chateau d'Ax–Gatorade	131	
55	Camillo Passera	Italy	Chateau d'Ax–Gatorade	DNF	
56	Mauro-Antonio Santaromita	Italy	Chateau d'Ax–Gatorade	147	
57	Jan Schur	Germany	Chateau d'Ax–Gatorade	139	
58	Valerio Tebaldi	Italy	Chateau d'Ax–Gatorade	89	
59	Stefano Zanatta	Italy	Chateau d'Ax–Gatorade	141	
61	Johan Bruyneel	Belgium	Lotto	35	
62	Peter De Clercq	Belgium	Lotto	137	
63	Sammie Moreels	Belgium	Lotto	DNF	
64	Johan Museeuw	Belgium	Lotto	DNF	
65	Jan Nevens	Belgium	Lotto	DNF	
66	Hendrik Redant	Belgium	Lotto	140	
67	Frank Van Den Abeele	Belgium	Lotto	90	
68	Rik Van Slycke	Belgium	Lotto	142	
69	Patrick Verschueren	Belgium	Lotto	130	
71	Andrew Hampsten	United States	Motorola	8	
72	Phil Anderson	Australia	Motorola	45	
73	Steve Bauer	Canada	Motorola	97	
74	Andy Bishop	United States	Motorola	126	
75	Michael Carter	United States	Motorola	DNF	
76	Ron Kiefel	United States	Motorola	138	
77	Dag Otto Lauritzen	Norway	Motorola	DNF	
78	Sean Yates	Great Britain	Motorola	DNF	
79	Urs Zimmermann	Switzerland	Motorola	116	
81	Fabio Parra	Colombia	Amaya Seguros	DNF	
82	Patrice Esnault	France	Amaya Seguros	28	
83	Enrique Guerrikagoitia	Spain	Amaya Seguros	143	
84	Roland Le Clerc	France	Amaya Seguros	106	
85	Jesús Montoya	Spain	Amaya Seguros	74	
86	Javier Murguialday	Spain	Amaya Seguros	22	
87	Per Pedersen	Denmark	Amaya Seguros	135	
88	Ronan Pensec	France	Amaya Seguros	41	
89	Fernando Quevedo	Spain	Amaya Seguros	DNF	
91	Laurent Fignon	France	Castorama–Raleigh	6	
92	Dominique Arnould	France	Castorama–Raleigh	68	
93	Jean-Claude Bagot	France	Castorama–Raleigh	36	
94	Christophe Lavainne	France	Castorama–Raleigh	92	
95	Luc Leblanc	France	Castorama–Raleigh	5	
96	Thierry Marie	France	Castorama–Raleigh	111	
97	Bjarne Riis	Denmark	Castorama–Raleigh	107	
98	Pascal Simon	France	Castorama–Raleigh	57	
99	Frédéric Vichot	France	Castorama–Raleigh	20	
101	Gilles Delion	France	Helvetia–La Suisse	21	
102	Serge Demierre	Switzerland	Helvetia–La Suisse	DNF	
103	Mauro Gianetti	Switzerland	Helvetia–La Suisse	98	
104	Dominik Krieger	Germany	Helvetia–La Suisse	63	
105	Henri Manders	Netherlands	Helvetia–La Suisse	144	
106	Pascal Richard	Switzerland	Helvetia–La Suisse	49	
107	Gérard Rué	France	Helvetia–La Suisse	10	
108	Peter Stevenhaagen	Netherlands	Helvetia–La Suisse	94	
109	Guido Winterberg	Switzerland	Helvetia–La Suisse	69	
111	Luis Herrera	Colombia	Postobón–Manzana–Ryalcao	31	
112	Alberto Luis Camargo	Colombia	Postobón–Manzana–Ryalcao	18	
113	Henry Cárdenas	Colombia	Postobón–Manzana–Ryalcao	43	
114	Arsenio Chaparro Cardoso	Colombia	Postobón–Manzana–Ryalcao	104	
115	Carlos Jaramillo	Colombia	Postobón–Manzana–Ryalcao	151	
116	Álvaro Mejía	Colombia	Postobón–Manzana–Ryalcao	19	
117	Gerardo Moncada	Colombia	Postobón–Manzana–Ryalcao	46	
118	Reynel Montoya	Colombia	Postobón–Manzana–Ryalcao	58	
119	Óscar Vargas	Colombia	Postobón–Manzana–Ryalcao	48	
121	Moreno Argentin	Italy	Ariostea	59	
122	Davide Cassani	Italy	Ariostea	112	
123	Bruno Cenghialta	Italy	Ariostea	56	
124	Roberto Conti	Italy	Ariostea	29	
125	Alberto Elli	Italy	Ariostea	91	
126	Rolf Gölz	Germany	Ariostea	79	
127	Massimiliano Lelli	Italy	Ariostea	DNF	
128	Marco Lietti	Italy	Ariostea	DNF	
129	Rolf Sørensen	Denmark	Ariostea	DNF	
131	Charly Mottet	France	RMO	4	
132	Éric Caritoux	France	RMO	17	
133	Thierry Claveyrolat	France	RMO	27	
134	Thierry Laurent	France	RMO	102	
135	Pascal Lino	France	RMO	70	
136	Marc Madiot	France	RMO	115	
137	Yvon Madiot	France	RMO	DNF	
138	Mauro Ribeiro	Brazil	RMO	47	
139	Michel Vermote	Belgium	RMO	118	
141	Gert-Jan Theunisse	Netherlands	TVM–Sanyo	13	
142	Thomas Barth	Germany	TVM–Sanyo	156	
143	Rob Harmeling	Netherlands	TVM–Sanyo	158	
144	Vasily Zhdanov	Soviet Union	TVM–Sanyo	121	
145	Dimitri Konyshev	Soviet Union	TVM–Sanyo	52	
146	Eddy Schurer	Netherlands	TVM–Sanyo	152	
147	Jan Siemons	Netherlands	TVM–Sanyo	146	
148	Jesper Skibby	Denmark	TVM–Sanyo	DNF	
149	Sergei Uslamin	Soviet Union	TVM–Sanyo	136	
151	Rudy Dhaenens	Belgium	Panasonic–Sportlife	DNF	
152	Viatcheslav Ekimov	Soviet Union	Panasonic–Sportlife	42	
153	Maurizio Fondriest	Italy	Panasonic–Sportlife	15	
154	Olaf Ludwig	Germany	Panasonic–Sportlife	114	
155	Guy Nulens	Belgium	Panasonic–Sportlife	62	
156	Marc Sergeant	Belgium	Panasonic–Sportlife	81	
157	Eric Van Lancker	Belgium	Panasonic–Sportlife	84	
158	Marc van Orsouw	Netherlands	Panasonic–Sportlife	78	
159	Dimitri Zhdanov	Soviet Union	Panasonic–Sportlife	86	
161	Thomas Wegmüller	Switzerland	Weinmann-Eddy Merckx	155	
162	Alfred Achermann	Switzerland	Weinmann-Eddy Merckx	145	
163	Carlo Bomans	Belgium	Weinmann-Eddy Merckx	DNF	
164	Michel Dernies	Belgium	Weinmann-Eddy Merckx	105	
165	Jan Goessens	Belgium	Weinmann-Eddy Merckx	DNF	
166	Rolf Järmann	Switzerland	Weinmann-Eddy Merckx	83	
167	Werner Stutz	Switzerland	Weinmann-Eddy Merckx	113	
168	Rudy Verdonck	Belgium	Weinmann-Eddy Merckx	109	
169	Ludwig Willems	Belgium	Weinmann-Eddy Merckx	150	
171	Uwe Ampler	Germany	Histor–Sigma	32	
172	Etienne De Wilde	Belgium	Histor–Sigma	125	
173	Brian Holm	Denmark	Histor–Sigma	124	
174	Andreas Kappes	Germany	Histor–Sigma	65	
175	Søren Lilholt	Denmark	Histor–Sigma	DNF	
176	Wilfried Peeters	Belgium	Histor–Sigma	95	
177	Remig Stumpf	Germany	Histor–Sigma	DNF	
178	Benjamin Van Itterbeeck	Belgium	Histor–Sigma	DNF	
179	Didier Virvaleix	France	Histor–Sigma	50	
181	Laurent Jalabert	France	Toshiba	71	
182	Henri Abadie	France	Toshiba	108	
183	Thierry Bourguignon	France	Toshiba	25	
184	Christian Chaubet	France	Toshiba	110	
185	Martial Gayant	France	Toshiba	DNF	
186	Pascal Lance	France	Toshiba	99	
187	Philippe Louviot	France	Toshiba	44	
188	Olaf Lurvik	Norway	Toshiba	73	
189	Denis Roux	France	Toshiba	16	
191	Steven Rooks	Netherlands	Buckler–Colnago–Decca	26	
192	Gerrit de Vries	Netherlands	Buckler–Colnago–Decca	34	
193	Frans Maassen	Netherlands	Buckler–Colnago–Decca	129	
194	Jelle Nijdam	Netherlands	Buckler–Colnago–Decca	117	
195	Twan Poels	Netherlands	Buckler–Colnago–Decca	154	
196	Gerrit Solleveld	Netherlands	Buckler–Colnago–Decca	133	
197	Edwig Van Hooydonck	Belgium	Buckler–Colnago–Decca	103	
198	Eric Vanderaerden	Belgium	Buckler–Colnago–Decca	127	
199	Wiebren Veenstra	Netherlands	Buckler–Colnago–Decca	157	
201	Stephen Roche	Ireland	Tonton Tapis–GB	DNF	
202	John Carlsen	Denmark	Tonton Tapis–GB	DNF	
203	Jean-Claude Colotti	France	Tonton Tapis–GB	80	
204	Dirk De Wolf	Belgium	Tonton Tapis–GB	DNF	
205	Patrick Jacobs	Belgium	Tonton Tapis–GB	82	
206	Francis Moreau	France	Tonton Tapis–GB	132	
207	Atle Pedersen	Norway	Tonton Tapis–GB	DNF	
208	Laurent Pillon	France	Tonton Tapis–GB	51	
209	Laurence Roche	Ireland	Tonton Tapis–GB	153	
211	Pello Ruiz Cabestany	Spain	CLAS–Cajastur	33	
212	Manuel Jorge Domínguez	Spain	CLAS–Cajastur	DNF	
213	Javier Duch	Spain	CLAS–Cajastur	122	
214	Nico Emonds	Belgium	CLAS–Cajastur	DNF	
215	Francisco Espinosa	Spain	CLAS–Cajastur	66	
216	Iñaki Gastón	Spain	CLAS–Cajastur	61	
217	Alberto Leanizbarrutia	Spain	CLAS–Cajastur	39	
218	Francisco Javier Mauleón	Spain	CLAS–Cajastur	55	
219	José Manuel Oliveira	Spain	CLAS–Cajastur	148	

=== By team ===
Z
No.	Rider	Pos.
1	Greg LeMond (USA)	7
2	Éric Boyer (FRA)	38
3	Philippe Casado (FRA)	87
4	Bruno Cornillet (FRA)	54
5	Gilbert Duclos-Lassalle (FRA)	60
6	Atle Kvålsvoll (NOR)	DNF
7	François Lemarchand (FRA)	101
8	Robert Millar (GBR)	72
9	Jérôme Simon (FRA)	23

Carrera Jeans–Tassoni
No.	Rider	Pos.
11	Claudio Chiappucci (ITA)	3
12	Djamolidine Abdoujaparov (URS)	85
13	Guido Bontempi (ITA)	96
14	Alessandro Gianelli (ITA)	40
15	Erich Maechler (SUI)	128
16	Jure Pavlič (SLO)	134
17	Giancarlo Perini (ITA)	120
18	Vladimir Poulnikov (URS)	88
19	Enrico Zaina (ITA)	93

PDM–Concorde–Ultima
No.	Rider	Pos.
21	Erik Breukink (NED)	DNF
22	Raúl Alcalá (MEX)	DNF
23	Falk Boden (GER)	DNF
24	Martin Earley (IRL)	DNF
25	Sean Kelly (IRL)	DNF
26	Uwe Raab (GER)	DNF
27	Jos van Aert (NED)	DNF
28	Jean-Paul van Poppel (NED)	DNF
29	Nico Verhoeven (NED)	DNF

Banesto
No.	Rider	Pos.
31	Pedro Delgado (ESP)	9
32	Marino Alonso (ESP)	123
33	Dominique Arnaud (FRA)	77
34	Jean-François Bernard (FRA)	14
35	Miguel Indurain (ESP)	1
36	Luis Javier Lukin (ESP)	119
37	Fabrice Philipot (FRA)	24
38	Jesús Rodríguez Magro (ESP)	100
39	Abelardo Rondón (COL)	12

ONCE
No.	Rider	Pos.
41	Marino Lejarreta (ESP)	53
42	Eduardo Chozas Olmo (ESP)	11
43	Herminio Díaz Zabala (ESP)	75
44	Anselmo Fuerte (ESP)	37
45	Stephen Hodge (AUS)	67
46	Miguel Ángel Martínez Torres (ESP)	76
47	Melcior Mauri (ESP)	64
48	José Luis Villanueva Orihuela (ESP)	DNF
49	Johnny Weltz (DEN)	DNF

Chateau d'Ax–Gatorade
No.	Rider	Pos.
51	Gianni Bugno (ITA)	2
52	Giuseppe Calcaterra (ITA)	149
53	Marco Giovannetti (ITA)	30
54	Roberto Gusmeroli (ITA)	131
55	Camillo Passera (ITA)	DNF
56	Mauro-Antonio Santaromita (ITA)	147
57	Jan Schur (GER)	139
58	Valerio Tebaldi (ITA)	89
59	Stefano Zanatta (ITA)	141

Lotto
No.	Rider	Pos.
61	Johan Bruyneel (BEL)	35
62	Peter De Clercq (BEL)	137
63	Sammie Moreels (BEL)	DNF
64	Johan Museeuw (BEL)	DNF
65	Jan Nevens (BEL)	DNF
66	Hendrik Redant (BEL)	140
67	Frank Van Den Abeele (BEL)	90
68	Rik Van Slycke (BEL)	142
69	Patrick Verschueren (BEL)	130

Motorola
No.	Rider	Pos.
71	Andrew Hampsten (USA)	8
72	Phil Anderson (AUS)	45
73	Steve Bauer (CAN)	97
74	Andy Bishop (USA)	126
75	Michael Carter (USA)	DNF
76	Ron Kiefel (USA)	138
77	Dag Otto Lauritzen (NOR)	DNF
78	Sean Yates (GBR)	DNF
79	Urs Zimmermann (SUI)	116

Amaya Seguros
No.	Rider	Pos.
81	Fabio Parra (COL)	DNF
82	Patrice Esnault (FRA)	28
83	Enrique Guerricagoitia (ESP)	143
84	Roland Le Clerc (FRA)	106
85	Jesús Montoya (ESP)	74
86	Javier Murguialday (ESP)	22
87	Per Pedersen (DEN)	135
88	Ronan Pensec (FRA)	41
89	Fernando Quevedo (ESP)	DNF

Castorama–Raleigh
No.	Rider	Pos.
91	Laurent Fignon (FRA)	6
92	Dominique Arnould (FRA)	68
93	Jean-Claude Bagot (FRA)	36
94	Christophe Lavainne (FRA)	92
95	Luc Leblanc (FRA)	5
96	Thierry Marie (FRA)	111
97	Bjarne Riis (DEN)	107
98	Pascal Simon (FRA)	57
99	Frédéric Vichot (FRA)	20

Helvetia–La Suisse
No.	Rider	Pos.
101	Gilles Delion (FRA)	21
102	Serge Demierre (SUI)	DNF
103	Mauro Gianetti (SUI)	98
104	Dominik Krieger (GER)	63
105	Henri Manders (NED)	144
106	Pascal Richard (SUI)	49
107	Gérard Rué (FRA)	10
108	Peter Stevenhaagen (NED)	94
109	Guido Winterberg (SUI)	69

Postobón–Manzana–Ryalcao
No.	Rider	Pos.
111	Luis Herrera (COL)	31
112	Alberto Luis Camargo (COL)	18
113	Henry Cárdenas (COL)	43
114	Arsenio Chaparro Cardoso (COL)	104
115	Carlos Jaramillo (COL)	151
116	Álvaro Mejía (COL)	19
117	Gerardo Moncada (COL)	46
118	Reynel Montoya (COL)	58
119	Óscar Vargas (COL)	48

Ariostea
No.	Rider	Pos.
121	Moreno Argentin (ITA)	59
122	Davide Cassani (ITA)	112
123	Bruno Cenghialta (ITA)	56
124	Roberto Conti (ITA)	29
125	Alberto Elli (ITA)	91
126	Rolf Gölz (GER)	79
127	Massimiliano Lelli (ITA)	DNF
128	Marco Lietti (ITA)	DNF
129	Rolf Sørensen (DEN)	DNF

RMO
No.	Rider	Pos.
131	Charly Mottet (FRA)	4
132	Éric Caritoux (FRA)	17
133	Thierry Claveyrolat (FRA)	27
134	Thierry Laurent (FRA)	102
135	Pascal Lino (FRA)	70
136	Marc Madiot (FRA)	115
137	Yvon Madiot (FRA)	DNF
138	Mauro Ribeiro (BRA)	47
139	Michel Vermote (BEL)	118

TVM–Sanyo
No.	Rider	Pos.
141	Gert-Jan Theunisse (NED)	13
142	Thomas Barth (GER)	156
143	Rob Harmeling (NED)	158
144	Vasily Zhdanov (URS)	121
145	Dimitri Konyshev (URS)	52
146	Eddy Schurer (NED)	152
147	Jan Siemons (NED)	146
148	Jesper Skibby (DEN)	DNF
149	Sergei Uslamin (URS)	136

Panasonic–Sportlife
No.	Rider	Pos.
151	Rudy Dhaenens (BEL)	DNF
152	Viatcheslav Ekimov (URS)	42
153	Maurizio Fondriest (ITA)	15
154	Olaf Ludwig (GER)	114
155	Guy Nulens (BEL)	62
156	Marc Sergeant (BEL)	81
157	Eric Van Lancker (BEL)	84
158	Marc van Orsouw (NED)	78
159	Dimitri Zhdanov (URS)	86

Weinmann–Eddy Merckx
No.	Rider	Pos.
161	Thomas Wegmüller (SUI)	155
162	Alfred Achermann (SUI)	145
163	Carlo Bomans (BEL)	DNF
164	Michel Dernies (BEL)	105
165	Jan Goessens (BEL)	DNF
166	Rolf Järmann (SUI)	83
167	Werner Stutz (SUI)	113
168	Rudy Verdonck (BEL)	109
169	Ludwig Willems (BEL)	150

Histor–Sigma
No.	Rider	Pos.
171	Uwe Ampler (GER)	32
172	Etienne De Wilde (BEL)	125
173	Brian Holm (DEN)	124
174	Andreas Kappes (GER)	65
175	Søren Lilholt (DEN)	DNF
176	Wilfried Peeters (BEL)	95
177	Remig Stumpf (GER)	DNF
178	Benjamin Van Itterbeeck (BEL)	DNF
179	Didier Virvaleix (FRA)	50

Toshiba
No.	Rider	Pos.
181	Laurent Jalabert (FRA)	71
182	Henri Abadie (FRA)	108
183	Thierry Bourguignon (FRA)	25
184	Christian Chaubet (FRA)	110
185	Martial Gayant (FRA)	DNF
186	Pascal Lance (FRA)	99
187	Philippe Louviot (FRA)	44
188	Olaf Lurvik (NOR)	73
189	Denis Roux (FRA)	16

Buckler–Colnago–Decca
No.	Rider	Pos.
191	Steven Rooks (NED)	26
192	Gerrit de Vries (NED)	34
193	Frans Maassen (NED)	129
194	Jelle Nijdam (NED)	117
195	Twan Poels (NED)	154
196	Gerrit Solleveld (NED)	133
197	Edwig Van Hooydonck (BEL)	103
198	Eric Vanderaerden (BEL)	127
199	Wiebren Veenstra (NED)	157

Tonton Tapis–GB
No.	Rider	Pos.
201	Stephen Roche (IRL)	DNF
202	John Carlsen (DEN)	DNF
203	Jean-Claude Colotti (FRA)	80
204	Dirk De Wolf (BEL)	DNF
205	Patrick Jacobs (BEL)	82
206	Francis Moreau (FRA)	132
207	Atle Pedersen (NOR)	DNF
208	Laurent Pillon (FRA)	51
209	Laurence Roche (IRL)	153

CLAS–Cajastur
No.	Rider	Pos.
211	Pello Ruiz Cabestany (ESP)	33
212	Manuel Jorge Domínguez (ESP)	DNF
213	Javier Duch (ESP)	122
214	Nico Emonds (BEL)	DNF
215	Francisco Espinosa (ESP)	66
216	Iñaki Gastón (ESP)	61
217	Alberto Leanizbarrutia (ESP)	39
218	Francisco Javier Mauleón (ESP)	55
219	José Manuel Oliveira (ESP)	148

=== By nationality ===
Country	No. of riders	Finishers	Stage wins
Australia	2	2	1 (Phil Anderson)
Brazil	1	1	1 (Mauro Ribeiro)
Belgium	27	18	1 (Etienne De Wilde)
Canada	1	1	
Colombia	11	10	
Denmark	8	4	
France	41	39	5 (Thierry Marie ×2, Charly Mottet ×2, Thierry Claveyrolat)
Germany	10	7	
Great Britain	2	1	
Ireland	4	1	
Italy	21	18	5 (Claudio Chiappucci, Bruno Cenghialta, Moreno Argentin, Marco Lietti, Gianni Bugno)
Mexico	1	0	
Netherlands	18	13	2 (Jelle Nijdam, Jean-Paul van Poppel)
Norway	4	1	
Slovenia	1	1	
Soviet Union	7	7	5 (Djamolidine Abdoujaparov ×2, Dimitri Konyshev ×2, Viatcheslav Ekimov)
Spain	24	21	2 (Miguel Indurain ×2)
Switzerland	10	9	
United States	5	4	
Total	198	158	22 (Note: The team time trial on stage 2, won by Ariostea, is not counted in this total.)
