= List of teams and cyclists in the 1990 Giro d'Italia =

The 1990 Giro d'Italia was the 73rd edition of the Giro d'Italia, one of cycling's Grand Tours. The field consisted of 197 riders, and 163 riders finished the race.

== By rider ==
Legend
No.	Starting number worn by the rider during the Giro
Pos.	Position in the general classification
DNF	Denotes a rider who did not finish

No.	Name	Nationality	Team	Pos.	Ref.
1	Laurent Fignon	France	Castorama	DNF	
2	Pascal Dubois	France	Castorama	DNF	
3	Christophe Lavainne	France	Castorama	94	
4	Gérard Rué	France	Castorama	59	
5	Pascal Simon	France	Castorama	73	
6	Thierry Marie	France	Castorama	119	
7	Dominique Garde	France	Castorama	81	
8	Fabrice Philipot	France	Castorama	13	
9	Bjarne Riis	Denmark	Castorama	100	
11	Dimitri Konyshev	Soviet Union	Alfa Lum	30	
12	Piotr Ugrumov	Soviet Union	Alfa Lum	8	
13	Vladimir Poulnikov	Soviet Union	Alfa Lum	4	
14	Djamolidine Abdoujaparov	Soviet Union	Alfa Lum	132	
15	Andrei Tchmil	Soviet Union	Alfa Lum	97	
16	Sergei Uslamin	Soviet Union	Alfa Lum	125	
17	Viktor Klimov	Soviet Union	Alfa Lum	103	
18	Asiat Saitov	Soviet Union	Alfa Lum	79	
19	Constantin Bankin	Soviet Union	Alfa Lum	155	
21	Pierino Gavazzi	Italy	Amore & Vita–Fanini	DNF	
22	Florido Barale	Italy	Amore & Vita–Fanini	115	
23	Simone Bruscoli	Italy	Amore & Vita–Fanini	147	
24	Daniel Efrain Castro	Argentina	Amore & Vita–Fanini	88	
25	Andrea Chiurato	Italy	Amore & Vita–Fanini	32	
26	Fabrizio Convalle	Italy	Amore & Vita–Fanini	135	
27	Stefano Della Santa	Italy	Amore & Vita–Fanini	DNF	
28	Roberto Pelliconi	Italy	Amore & Vita–Fanini	141	
29	Stefano Giraldi	Italy	Amore & Vita–Fanini	DNS	
31	Flavio Giupponi	Italy	Carrera Jeans–Vagabond	17	
32	Guido Bontempi	Italy	Carrera Jeans–Vagabond	118	
33	Massimo Ghirotto	Italy	Carrera Jeans–Vagabond	34	
34	Jure Pavlič	Yugoslavia	Carrera Jeans–Vagabond	27	
35	Enrico Zaina	Italy	Carrera Jeans–Vagabond	16	
36	Mario Chiesa	Italy	Carrera Jeans–Vagabond	137	
37	Claudio Chiappucci	Italy	Carrera Jeans–Vagabond	12	
38	Giancarlo Perini	Italy	Carrera Jeans–Vagabond	36	
39	Acácio da Silva	Portugal	Carrera Jeans–Vagabond	49	
41	Ángel Camarillo	Spain	CLAS–Cajastur	43	
42	Juan Carlos Sevilla	Spain	CLAS–Cajastur	DNF	
43	Javier Duch	Spain	CLAS–Cajastur	117	
44	Federico Echave	Spain	CLAS–Cajastur	5	
45	Jesus Rodriguez Carballido	Spain	CLAS–Cajastur	158	
46	Francisco Javier Mauleón	Spain	CLAS–Cajastur	25	
47	Casimiro Moreda	Spain	CLAS–Cajastur	148	
48	Francisco Ochaita	Spain	CLAS–Cajastur	DNF	
49	José-Manuel Oliveira	Spain	CLAS–Cajastur	140	
51	Adriano Baffi	Italy	Ariostea	145	
52	Sergio Carcano	Italy	Ariostea	99	
53	Marco Saligari	Italy	Ariostea	92	
54	Roberto Conti	Italy	Ariostea	29	
55	Stephan Joho	Switzerland	Ariostea	74	
56	Massimiliano Lelli	Italy	Ariostea	9	
57	Marco Lietti	Italy	Ariostea	83	
58	Rodolfo Massi	Italy	Ariostea	35	
59	Rolf Sørensen	Denmark	Ariostea	76	
61	Marino Amadori	Italy	Del Tongo	28	
62	Franco Ballerini	Italy	Del Tongo	109	
63	Francesco Cesarini	Italy	Del Tongo	111	
64	Franco Chioccioli	Italy	Del Tongo	6	
65	Mario Cipollini	Italy	Del Tongo	142	
66	Marco Zen	Italy	Del Tongo	62	
67	Luca Gelfi	Italy	Del Tongo	42	
68	Angelo Lecchi	Italy	Del Tongo	14	
69	Fabio Roscioli	Italy	Del Tongo	61	
71	Giuseppe Saronni	Italy	Diana–Colnago–Animex	45	
72	Emanuele Bombini	Italy	Diana–Colnago–Animex	41	
73	Fabio Bordonali	Italy	Diana–Colnago–Animex	121	
74	Giorgio Furlan	Italy	Diana–Colnago–Animex	126	
75	Maurizio Piovani	Italy	Diana–Colnago–Animex	60	
76	Joaquim Halupczok	Poland	Diana–Colnago–Animex	DNF	
77	Lech Piasecki	Poland	Diana–Colnago–Animex	56	
78	Zenon Jaskuła	Poland	Diana–Colnago–Animex	20	
79	Gianluca Bortolami	Italy	Diana–Colnago–Animex	123	
81	Jorg Bruggmann	Switzerland	Frank–Monte Tamaro	138	
82	Pascal Ducrot	Switzerland	Frank–Monte Tamaro	157	
83	Bruno Holenweger	Switzerland	Frank–Monte Tamaro	116	
84	Rolf Järmann	Switzerland	Frank–Monte Tamaro	71	
85	Jens Jentner	Switzerland	Frank–Monte Tamaro	82	
86	Masatoshi Ichikawa	Japan	Frank–Monte Tamaro	50	
87	Daniel Steiger	Switzerland	Frank–Monte Tamaro	DNF	
88	Werner Stutz	Switzerland	Frank–Monte Tamaro	51	
89	Marco Vitali	Italy	Frank–Monte Tamaro	54	
91	Silvano Contini	Italy	Gis Gelati–Benotto	DNF	
92	Maurizio Vandelli	Italy	Gis Gelati–Benotto	22	
93	Alessio Di Basco	Italy	Gis Gelati–Benotto	163	
94	Paolo Rosola	Italy	Gis Gelati–Benotto	139	
95	Luciano Rabottini	Italy	Gis Gelati–Benotto	96	
96	Dario Bottaro	Italy	Gis Gelati–Benotto	DNF	
97	Danilo Gioia	Italy	Gis Gelati–Benotto	150	
98	Angelo Canzonieri	Italy	Gis Gelati–Benotto	134	
99	Paolo Cimini	Italy	Gis Gelati–Benotto	124	
101	Stefano Allocchio	Italy	Italbonifica–Navigare	162	
102	Stefano Arlotti	Italy	Italbonifica–Navigare	DNF	
103	Stefano Bianchini	Italy	Italbonifica–Navigare	64	
104	Cesare Cipollini	Italy	Italbonifica–Navigare	DNF	
105	Fabiano Fontanelli	Italy	Italbonifica–Navigare	DNF	
106	Michele Moro	Italy	Italbonifica–Navigare	DNF	
107	Massimo Podenzana	Italy	Italbonifica–Navigare	37	
108	Dario Rando	Italy	Italbonifica–Navigare	DNF	
109	Luca Rigamonti	Italy	Italbonifica–Navigare	107	
111	Roberto Visentini	Italy	Jolly Componibili–Club 88	26	
112	Paolo Botarelli	Italy	Jolly Componibili–Club 88	106	
113	Stefano Cattai	Italy	Jolly Componibili–Club 88	66	
114	Stefano Colagè	Italy	Jolly Componibili–Club 88	DNF	
115	Maurizio Rossi	Italy	Jolly Componibili–Club 88	55	
116	Stefano Giuliani	Italy	Jolly Componibili–Club 88	58	
117	Bruno Leali	Italy	Jolly Componibili–Club 88	120	
118	Silvio Martinello	Italy	Jolly Componibili–Club 88	149	
119	Francesco Rossignoli	Italy	Jolly Componibili–Club 88	114	
121	Gianluca Tonetti	Italy	Malvor–Sidi	DNF	
122	Roberto Pagnin	Italy	Malvor–Sidi	69	
123	Gianni Faresin	Italy	Malvor–Sidi	44	
124	Giovanni Strazzer	Italy	Malvor–Sidi	160	
125	Daniele Gallo	Italy	Malvor–Sidi	102	
126	Silvano Lorenzon	Italy	Malvor–Sidi	130	
127	Gianluca Pierobon	Italy	Malvor–Sidi	85	
128	Stefano Tomasini	Italy	Malvor–Sidi	DNF	
129	Giuseppe Citterio	Italy	Malvor–Sidi	DNF	
131	Eduardo Chozas	Spain	ONCE	11	
132	Luis María Díaz De Otazu	Spain	ONCE	84	
133	Herminio Díaz Zabala	Spain	ONCE	78	
134	Pedro Díaz Zabala	Spain	ONCE	70	
135	Stephen Hodge	Australia	ONCE	19	
136	Marino Lejarreta	Spain	ONCE	7	
137	Javier Aldanondo	Spain	ONCE	122	
138	Alex Pedersen	Denmark	ONCE	52	
139	José Luis Villanueva	Spain	ONCE	89	
141	Harry Rozendal	Netherlands	Panasonic–Sportlife	129	
142	Urs Freuler	Switzerland	Panasonic–Sportlife	DNF	
143	Louis De Koning	Netherlands	Panasonic–Sportlife	87	
144	Eric Van Lancker	Belgium	Panasonic–Sportlife	DNF	
145	Allan Peiper	Australia	Panasonic–Sportlife	144	
146	Jean-Paul van Poppel	Netherlands	Panasonic–Sportlife	154	
147	Steven Rooks	Netherlands	Panasonic–Sportlife	75	
148	Theo de Rooij	Netherlands	Panasonic–Sportlife	161	
149	Gert-Jan Theunisse	Netherlands	Panasonic–Sportlife	15	
151	Charly Mottet	France	RMO	2	
152	Jean-Claude Colotti	France	RMO	95	
153	Christophe Manin	France	RMO	104	
154	Frédéric Brun	France	RMO	57	
155	Dante Rezze	France	RMO	DNF	
156	Jean-Claude Bagot	France	RMO	18	
157	Per Pedersen	Denmark	RMO	93	
158	Michel Vermote	Belgium	RMO	131	
159	Marcel Wüst	West Germany	RMO	143	
161	Gianni Bugno	Italy	Chateau d'Ax–Salotti	1	
162	Giovanni Fidanza	Italy	Chateau d'Ax–Salotti	133	
163	Alberto Volpi	Italy	Chateau d'Ax–Salotti	38	
164	Franco Vona	Italy	Chateau d'Ax–Salotti	31	
165	Stefano Zanatta	Italy	Chateau d'Ax–Salotti	152	
166	Mauro Santaromita	Italy	Chateau d'Ax–Salotti	65	
167	Camillo Passera	Italy	Chateau d'Ax–Salotti	40	
168	Jan Schur	East Germany	Chateau d'Ax–Salotti	91	
169	Valerio Tebaldi	Italy	Chateau d'Ax–Salotti	DNF	
171	Leonardo Sierra	Venezuela	Selle Italia–Eurocar	10	
172	Andrea Tafi	Italy	Selle Italia–Eurocar	DNF	
173	Daniel Wyder	Switzerland	Selle Italia–Eurocar	DNF	
174	Antonio Fanelli	Italy	Selle Italia–Eurocar	146	
175	Raimondo Vairetti	Italy	Selle Italia–Eurocar	77	
176	Herbert Niederberger	Switzerland	Selle Italia–Eurocar	90	
177	Claudio Savini	Italy	Selle Italia–Eurocar	86	
178	Sergio Scremin	Italy	Selle Italia–Eurocar	153	
179	Stefano Breme	Italy	Selle Italia–Eurocar	151	
181	Marco Giovannetti	Italy	Seur	3	
182	José Rodriguez	Spain	Seur	101	
183	Jon Unzaga	Spain	Seur	DNF	
184	Juan Carlos Rozas	Spain	Seur	46	
185	Francisco Espinosa	Spain	Seur	47	
186	Rafael Garcia	Spain	Seur	110	
187	Roque de la Cruz	Spain	Seur	53	
188	Vicente Ridaura	Spain	Seur	72	
189	Federico García	Spain	Seur	108	
191	Urs Zimmermann	Switzerland	7-Eleven	DNF	
192	Jeff Pierce	United States	7-Eleven	113	
193	Frankie Andreu	United States	7-Eleven	136	
194	Norman Alvis	United States	7-Eleven	127	
195	John Tomac	United States	7-Eleven	DNF	
196	Nathan Dahlberg	New Zealand	7-Eleven	39	
197	Roy Knickman	United States	7-Eleven	DNF	
198	Thomas Craven	United States	7-Eleven	DNF	
199	Andy Bishop	United States	7-Eleven	80	
201	Phil Anderson	Australia	TVM	33	
202	Jesper Skibby	Denmark	TVM	DNF	
203	Maarten Ducrot	Netherlands	TVM	98	
204	Patrick Jacobs	Belgium	TVM	68	
205	Jan Siemons	Netherlands	TVM	156	
206	Dag Erik Pedersen	Norway	TVM	DNF	
207	Jacques Hanegraaf	Netherlands	TVM	DNF	
208	Scott Sunderland	Australia	TVM	DNF	
209	Martin Schalkers	Netherlands	TVM	112	
211	Greg LeMond	United States	Z–Tomasso	105	
212	Henri Abadie	France	Z–Tomasso	48	
213	Wayne Bennington	Great Britain	Z–Tomasso	63	
214	Éric Boyer	France	Z–Tomasso	23	
215	Philippe Casado	France	Z–Tomasso	67	
216	Gilbert Duclos-Lassalle	France	Z–Tomasso	24	
217	François Lemarchand	France	Z–Tomasso	21	
218	Pascal Poisson	France	Z–Tomasso	128	
219	Johan Lammerts	Netherlands	Z–Tomasso	159	
