= List of teams and cyclists in the 1988 Giro d'Italia =

The 1988 Giro d'Italia was the 71st edition of the Giro d'Italia, one of cycling's Grand Tours. The field consisted of 180 riders, and 125 riders finished the race.

== By rider ==
Legend
No.	Starting number worn by the rider during the Giro
Pos.	Position in the general classification
DNF	Denotes a rider who did not finish

No.	Name	Nationality	Team	Pos.	Ref
1	Flavio Chesini	Italy	Alba Cucine-Benotto	104	
2	Stefano Colagè	Italy	Alba Cucine-Benotto	DNF	
3	Marco Franceschini	Italy	Alba Cucine-Benotto	25	
4	Enrico Galleschi	Italy	Alba Cucine-Benotto	51	
5	Alessandro Giannelli	Italy	Alba Cucine-Benotto	DNF	
6	Enrico Grimani	Italy	Alba Cucine-Benotto	122	
7	Rodolfo Massi	Italy	Alba Cucine-Benotto	DNF	
8	Mauro Santaromita	Italy	Alba Cucine-Benotto	34	
9	Claudio Savini	Italy	Alba Cucine-Benotto	28	
11	Marino Amadori	Italy	Alfa Lum–Legnano–Ecoflam	26	
12	Luciano Boffo	Italy	Alfa Lum–Legnano–Ecoflam	108	
13	Daniele Caroli	Italy	Alfa Lum–Legnano–Ecoflam	116	
14	Orlando Maini	Italy	Alfa Lum–Legnano–Ecoflam	DNF	
15	Camillo Passera	Italy	Alfa Lum–Legnano–Ecoflam	DNF	
16	Maurizio Rossi	Italy	Alfa Lum–Legnano–Ecoflam	DNF	
17	Federico Longo	Italy	Alfa Lum–Legnano–Ecoflam	DNF	
18	Marco Zen	Italy	Alfa Lum–Legnano–Ecoflam	83	
19	Jiří Škoda	Czechoslovakia	Alfa Lum–Legnano–Ecoflam	60	
21	Gianbattista Bardelloni	Italy	Atala–Ofmega	DNF	
22	Tullio Cortinovis	Italy	Atala–Ofmega	87	
23	Giovanni Mantovani	Italy	Atala–Ofmega	DNF	
24	Silvio Martinello	Italy	Atala–Ofmega	107	
25	Mario Noris	Italy	Atala–Ofmega	96	
26	Massimo Podenzana	Italy	Atala–Ofmega	41	
27	Claudio Vandelli	Italy	Atala–Ofmega	89	
28	Maurizio Vandelli	Italy	Atala–Ofmega	10	
29	Marco Vitali	Italy	Atala–Ofmega	35	
31	Roberto Visentini	Italy	Carrera Jeans–Vagabond	13	
32	Urs Zimmermann	Switzerland	Carrera Jeans–Vagabond	3	
33	Guido Bontempi	Italy	Carrera Jeans–Vagabond	91	
34	Massimo Ghirotto	Italy	Carrera Jeans–Vagabond	18	
35	Erich Maechler	Switzerland	Carrera Jeans–Vagabond	DNF	
36	Primož Čerin	Yugoslavia	Carrera Jeans–Vagabond	DNF	
37	Claudio Chiappucci	Italy	Carrera Jeans–Vagabond	24	
38	Fabio Bordonali	Italy	Carrera Jeans–Vagabond	84	
39	Marco Votolo	Italy	Carrera Jeans–Vagabond	78	
41	Francesco Cesarini	Italy	Ariostea–Gres	88	
42	Kjell Nilsson	Sweden	Ariostea–Gres	DNF	
43	Stephan Joho	Switzerland	Ariostea–Gres	DNF	
44	Valerio Piva	Italy	Ariostea–Gres	100	
45	Luciano Rabottini	Italy	Ariostea–Gres	53	
46	Fabio Roscioli	Italy	Ariostea–Gres	DNF	
47	Marco Saligari	Italy	Ariostea–Gres	93	
48	Marcello Siboni	Italy	Ariostea–Gres	39	
49	Rolf Sørensen	Denmark	Ariostea–Gres	42	
51	Giuseppe Saronni	Italy	Del Tongo	27	
52	Maurizio Piovani	Italy	Del Tongo	70	
53	Franco Chioccioli	Italy	Del Tongo	5	
54	Flavio Giupponi	Italy	Del Tongo	4	
55	Angelo Lecchi	Italy	Del Tongo	29	
56	Luciano Loro	Italy	Del Tongo	36	
57	Czesław Lang	Poland	Del Tongo	80	
58	Lech Piasecki	Poland	Del Tongo	74	
59	Luca Rota	Italy	Del Tongo	52	
61	Stefano Tomasini	Italy	Fanini–Seven Up	9	
62	Paolo Cimini	Italy	Fanini–Seven Up	DNF	
63	Pierino Gavazzi	Italy	Fanini–Seven Up	67	
64	Alessio Di Basco	Italy	Fanini–Seven Up	109	
65	Sergio Finazzi	Italy	Fanini–Seven Up	DNF	
66	Alberto Elli	Italy	Fanini–Seven Up	86	
67	Luigi Botteon	Italy	Fanini–Seven Up	77	
68	Maurizio Spreafico	Italy	Fanini–Seven Up	DNF	
69	Walter Brugna	Italy	Fanini–Seven Up	DNF	
71	Luigi Furlan	Italy	Gewiss–Bianchi	97	
72	Emanuele Bombini	Italy	Gewiss–Bianchi	20	
73	Davide Cassani	Italy	Gewiss–Bianchi	DNF	
74	Roberto Pagnin	Italy	Gewiss–Bianchi	49	
75	Renato Piccolo	Italy	Gewiss–Bianchi	63	
76	Paolo Rosola	Italy	Gewiss–Bianchi	102	
77	Ennio Salvador	Italy	Gewiss–Bianchi	73	
78	Alberto Volpi	Italy	Gewiss–Bianchi	19	
79	Jesper Worre	Denmark	Gewiss–Bianchi	68	
81	Adriano Baffi	Italy	GIS–Ecoflam–Jolly	DNF	
82	Salvatore Cavallaro	Italy	GIS–Ecoflam–Jolly	DNF	
83	Cesare Cipollini	Italy	GIS–Ecoflam–Jolly	DNF	
84	Daniele Del Ben	Italy	GIS–Ecoflam–Jolly	113	
85	Federico Ghiotto	Italy	GIS–Ecoflam–Jolly	90	
86	Marco Giovannetti	Italy	GIS–Ecoflam–Jolly	6	
87	Palmiro Masciarelli	Italy	GIS–Ecoflam–Jolly	DNF	
88	Giuseppe Petito	Italy	GIS–Ecoflam–Jolly	106	
89	Johan van der Velde	Netherlands	GIS–Ecoflam–Jolly	65	
91	Beat Breu	Switzerland	Magniflex-Cyndarella	11	
92	Fabian Fuchs	Switzerland	Magniflex-Cyndarella	DNF	
93	Daniel Gisiger	Switzerland	Magniflex-Cyndarella	92	
94	Bruno Hürlimann	Switzerland	Magniflex-Cyndarella	72	
95	Rolf Järmann	Switzerland	Magniflex-Cyndarella	48	
96	Omar Pedretti	Switzerland	Magniflex-Cyndarella	DNF	
97	Pius Schwarzentruber	Switzerland	Magniflex-Cyndarella	DNF	
98	Kurt Steinmann	Switzerland	Magniflex-Cyndarella	71	
99	Werner Stutz	Switzerland	Magniflex-Cyndarella	43	
101	Silvano Contini	Italy	Malvor–Bottecchia–Sidi	22	
102	Gianni Faresin	Italy	Malvor–Bottecchia–Sidi	50	
103	Gianpaolo Fregonese	Italy	Malvor–Bottecchia–Sidi	64	
104	Silvano Lorenzon	Italy	Malvor–Bottecchia–Sidi	85	
105	Daniele Pizzol	Italy	Malvor–Bottecchia–Sidi	81	
106	Giovanni Strazzer	Italy	Malvor–Bottecchia–Sidi	110	
107	Helmut Wechselberger	Austria	Malvor–Bottecchia–Sidi	23	
108	Arno Wohlfahrter	Austria	Malvor–Bottecchia–Sidi	99	
109	Paul Popp	Austria	Malvor–Bottecchia–Sidi	115	
111	Alfio Vandi	Italy	Mosoca-Isoglass-Galli	31	
112	Hendrik Redant	Belgium	Mosoca-Isoglass-Galli	124	
113	Luc Ronsse	Belgium	Mosoca-Isoglass-Galli	117	
114	Dirk Clarysse	Belgium	Mosoca-Isoglass-Galli	DNF	
115	Geert Van de Walle	Belgium	Mosoca-Isoglass-Galli	123	
116	Domenico Cavallo	Italy	Mosoca-Isoglass-Galli	DNF	
117	Antonio Ferretti	Switzerland	Mosoca-Isoglass-Galli	112	
118	Daniel Wyder	Switzerland	Mosoca-Isoglass-Galli	58	
119	Jan Østergaard	Denmark	Mosoca-Isoglass-Galli	119	
121	Erik Breukink	Netherlands	Panasonic–Isostar–Colnago–Agu	2	
122	Urs Freuler	Switzerland	Panasonic–Isostar–Colnago–Agu	82	
123	Henk Lubberding	Netherlands	Panasonic–Isostar–Colnago–Agu	69	
124	Guy Nulens	Belgium	Panasonic–Isostar–Colnago–Agu	17	
125	Allan Peiper	Australia	Panasonic–Isostar–Colnago–Agu	103	
126	Theo de Rooij	Netherlands	Panasonic–Isostar–Colnago–Agu	79	
127	Eric Vanderaerden	Belgium	Panasonic–Isostar–Colnago–Agu	75	
128	Teun van Vliet	Netherlands	Panasonic–Isostar–Colnago–Agu	57	
129	Peter Winnen	Netherlands	Panasonic–Isostar–Colnago–Agu	8	
131	Greg LeMond	United States	PDM–Ultima–Concorde	DNF	
132	Vincent Barteau	France	PDM–Ultima–Concorde	DNF	
133	Rudy Dhaenens	Belgium	PDM–Ultima–Concorde	DNF	
134	Jörg Müller	Switzerland	PDM–Ultima–Concorde	55	
135	Dag Erik Pedersen	Norway	PDM–Ultima–Concorde	DNF	
136	Steven Rooks	Netherlands	PDM–Ultima–Concorde	DNF	
137	Peter Stevenhaagen	Netherlands	PDM–Ultima–Concorde	DNF	
138	Gert-Jan Theunisse	Netherlands	PDM–Ultima–Concorde	DNF	
139	Marc van Orsouw	Netherlands	PDM–Ultima–Concorde	66	
141	Pedro Delgado	Spain	Reynolds	7	
142	Javier Lukin	Spain	Reynolds	32	
143	José Luis Laguía	Spain	Reynolds	30	
144	Omar Hernández	Colombia	Reynolds	47	
145	Dominique Arnaud	France	Reynolds	38	
146	William Palacio	Colombia	Reynolds	DNF	
147	Kari Myyryläinen	Finland	Reynolds	DNF	
148	Jesús Rodríguez Magro	Spain	Reynolds	45	
149	Melcior Mauri	Spain	Reynolds	98	
151	Gianni Bugno	Italy	Chateau d'Ax	DNF	
152	Tony Rominger	Switzerland	Chateau d'Ax	44	
153	Claudio Corti	Italy	Chateau d'Ax	54	
154	Stefano Allocchio	Italy	Chateau d'Ax	114	
155	Giovanni Bottoia	Italy	Chateau d'Ax	121	
156	Stefano Giuliani	Italy	Chateau d'Ax	56	
157	Alessandro Pozzi	Italy	Chateau d'Ax	76	
158	Ennio Vanotti	Italy	Chateau d'Ax	21	
159	Franco Vona	Italy	Chateau d'Ax	15	
161	Daniele Asti	Italy	Selca	DNF	
162	Roberto Conti	Italy	Selca	33	
163	Michele Moro	Italy	Selca	59	
164	Dante Morandi	Italy	Selca	125	
165	Moreno Musetti	Italy	Selca	DNF	
166	Patrizio Gambirasio	Italy	Selca	120	
167	Eduardo Rocchi	Italy	Selca	111	
168	Gianluca Brugnami	Italy	Selca	DNF	
169	Fabrizio Vannucci	Italy	Selca	95	
171	Raúl Alcalá	Mexico	7-Eleven–Hoonved	14	
172	Andrew Hampsten	United States	7-Eleven–Hoonved	1	
173	Ron Kiefel	United States	7-Eleven–Hoonved	62	
174	Roy Knickman	United States	7-Eleven–Hoonved	DNF	
175	Dag Otto Lauritzen	Norway	7-Eleven–Hoonved	DNF	
176	Davis Phinney	United States	7-Eleven–Hoonved	118	
177	Jeff Pierce	United States	7-Eleven–Hoonved	46	
178	Bob Roll	United States	7-Eleven–Hoonved	61	
179	Jens Veggerby	Denmark	7-Eleven–Hoonved	DNF	
181	Jean-François Bernard	France	Toshiba–Look	DNF	
182	Pierangelo Bincoletto	Italy	Toshiba–Look	101	
183	Andreas Kappes	West Germany	Toshiba–Look	DNF	
184	Johan Lammerts	Netherlands	Toshiba–Look	105	
185	Marc Madiot	France	Toshiba–Look	12	
186	Pascal Poisson	France	Toshiba–Look	DNF	
187	Fabrice Philipot	France	Toshiba–Look	37	
188	Dominique Gaigne	France	Toshiba–Look	DNF	
189	Bjarne Riis	Denmark	Toshiba–Look	DNF	
191	Juan Fernández	Spain	Zahor Chocolates	DNF	
192	Cyrille Fancello	France	Zahor Chocolates	DNF	
193	Benny Van Brabant	Belgium	Zahor Chocolates	DNF	
194	Ángel Ocaña	Spain	Zahor Chocolates	DNF	
195	Juan Tomás Martínez	Spain	Zahor Chocolates	16	
196	Jesús Suárez Cueva	Spain	Zahor Chocolates	94	
197	Jesús Ibáñez Loyo	Spain	Zahor Chocolates	DNF	
198	Santiago Portillo	Spain	Zahor Chocolates	40	
199	Juan Martin Zapatero	Spain	Zahor Chocolates	DNF	
