= 1990 Giro d'Italia, Stage 1 to Stage 10 =

Cycling race stages

The 1990 Giro d'Italia was the 73rd edition of the Giro d'Italia, one of cycling's Grand Tours. The Giro began in Bari, with an individual time trial on 18 May, and Stage 10 occurred on 27 May with a stage to Cuneo. The race finished in Milan on 6 June.

== Stage 1 ==
18 May 1990 — Bari to Bari, 13 km (8.1 mi) (ITT)

Stage 1 result and general classification after Stage 1

Rank	Rider	Team	Time
1	Gianni Bugno (ITA)	Chateau d'Ax–Salotti	15' 19"
2	Thierry Marie (FRA)	Castorama	+ 3"
3	Lech Piasecki (POL)	Diana–Colnago–Animex	+ 9"
4	Stephen Hodge (AUS)	ONCE	+ 12"
5	Angelo Lecchi (ITA)	Del Tongo	+ 21"
6	Joaquim Halupczok (POL)	Diana–Colnago–Animex	+ 22"
7	Michel Vermote (BEL)	RMO	+ 24"
8	Daniel Steiger (SUI)	Frank–Monte Tamaro	s.t.
9	Roberto Pagnin (ITA)	Malvor–Sidi	s.t.
10	Allan Peiper (AUS)	Panasonic–Sportlife	+ 26"

== Stage 2 ==
19 May 1990 — Bari to Sala Consilina, 239 km (149 mi)

Stage 2 result

Rank	Rider	Team	Time
1	Giovanni Fidanza (ITA)	Chateau d'Ax–Salotti	6h 33' 14"
2	Laurent Fignon (FRA)	Castorama	s.t.
3	Charly Mottet (FRA)	RMO	s.t.
4	Piotr Ugrumov (URS)	Alfa Lum	s.t.
5	Casimiro Moreda (ESP)	CLAS–Cajastur	s.t.
6	Claudio Chiappucci (ITA)	Carrera Jeans–Vagabond	s.t.
7	Stefano Colagè (ITA)	Jolly Componibili–Club 88	s.t.
8	Roberto Pagnin (ITA)	Malvor–Sidi	s.t.
9	Leonardo Sierra (VEN)	Selle Italia–Eurocar	s.t.
10	Angelo Lecchi (ITA)	Del Tongo	s.t.

General classification after Stage 2

Rank	Rider	Team	Time
1	Gianni Bugno (ITA)	Chateau d'Ax–Salotti	6h 48' 33"
2	Thierry Marie (FRA)	Castorama	+ 1"
3	Lech Piasecki (POL)	Diana–Colnago–Animex	+ 9"
4	Stephen Hodge (AUS)	ONCE	+ 12"
5	Angelo Lecchi (ITA)	Del Tongo	+ 21"
6	Laurent Fignon (FRA)	Castorama	s.t.
7	Joaquim Halupczok (POL)	Diana–Colnago–Animex	+ 22"
8	Michel Vermote (BEL)	RMO	+ 24"
9	Daniel Steiger (SUI)	Frank–Monte Tamaro	s.t.
10	Roberto Pagnin (ITA)	Malvor–Sidi	s.t.

== Stage 3 ==
20 May 1990 — Sala Consilina to Mount Vesuvius, 239 km (149 mi)

Stage 3 result

Rank	Rider	Team	Time
1	Eduardo Chozas (ESP)	ONCE	5h 00' 08"
2	Gianni Bugno (ITA)	Chateau d'Ax–Salotti	+ 26"
3	Acácio da Silva (POR)	Carrera Jeans–Vagabond	+ 34"
4	Piotr Ugrumov (URS)	Alfa Lum	+ 42"
5	Marino Lejarreta (ESP)	ONCE	+ 48"
6	Daniel Steiger (SUI)	Frank–Monte Tamaro	+ 51"
7	François Lemarchand (FRA)	Z–Tomasso	+ 56"
8	Massimo Podenzana (ITA)	Italbonifica–Navigare	+ 59"
9	Federico Echave (ESP)	CLAS–Cajastur	s.t.
10	Marco Giovannetti (ITA)	Seur	s.t.

General classification after Stage 3

Rank	Rider	Team	Time
1	Gianni Bugno (ITA)	Chateau d'Ax–Salotti	11h 48' 59"
2	Eduardo Chozas (ESP)	ONCE	+ 43"
3	Daniel Steiger (SUI)	Frank–Monte Tamaro	+ 57"
4	Laurent Fignon (FRA)	Castorama	+ 1' 08"
5	Joaquim Halupczok (POL)	Diana–Colnago–Animex	+ 1' 09"
6	Marino Lejarreta (ESP)	ONCE	+ 1' 10"
7	Angelo Lecchi (ITA)	Del Tongo	+ 1' 12"
8	Claudio Chiappucci (ITA)	Carrera Jeans–Vagabond	+ 1' 15"
9	Zenon Jaskuła (POL)	Diana–Colnago–Animex	+ 1' 17"
10	Federico Echave (ESP)	CLAS–Cajastur	+ 1' 18"

== Stage 4a ==
21 May 1990 — Ercolano to Nola, 31 km (19 mi)

Stage 4a result

Rank	Rider	Team	Time
1	Stefano Allocchio (ITA)	Italbonifica–Navigare	6h 33' 14"
2	Jan Schur (DDR)	Chateau d'Ax–Salotti	s.t.
3	Daniele Gioia (ITA)	Gis Gelati–Benotto	s.t.
4	Urs Freuler (SUI)	Panasonic–Sportlife	s.t.
5	Gianluca Bortolami (ITA)	Diana–Colnago–Animex	s.t.
6	Giovanni Fidanza (ITA)	Chateau d'Ax–Salotti	s.t.
7	Casimiro Moreda (ESP)	CLAS–Cajastur	s.t.
8	Giuseppe Citterio (ITA)	Malvor–Sidi	s.t.
9	Michel Vermote (BEL)	RMO	s.t.
10	Phil Anderson (AUS)	TVM	s.t.

== Stage 4b ==
21 May 1990 — Nola to Sora, 164 km (102 mi)

Stage 4b result

Rank	Rider	Team	Time
1	Phil Anderson (AUS)	TVM	3h 54' 16"
2	Christophe Lavainne (FRA)	Castorama	s.t.
3	Adriano Baffi (ITA)	Ariostea	+ 1"
4	Mario Cipollini (ITA)	Del Tongo	s.t.
5	Marco Vitali (ITA)	Frank–Monte Tamaro	s.t.
6	Guido Bontempi (ITA)	Carrera Jeans–Vagabond	s.t.
7	Giovanni Fidanza (ITA)	Chateau d'Ax–Salotti	s.t.
8	Cesare Cipollini (ITA)	Italbonifica–Navigare	s.t.
9	Silvio Martinello (ITA)	Jolly Componibili–Club 88	s.t.
10	Marcel Wüst (FRG)	RMO	s.t.

General classification after Stage 4b

Rank	Rider	Team	Time
1	Gianni Bugno (ITA)	Chateau d'Ax–Salotti	16h 22' 42"
2	Eduardo Chozas (ESP)	ONCE	+ 43"
3	Daniel Steiger (SUI)	Frank–Monte Tamaro	+ 57"
4	Laurent Fignon (FRA)	Castorama	+ 1' 08"
5	Joaquim Halupczok (POL)	Diana–Colnago–Animex	+ 1' 09"
6	Marino Lejarreta (ESP)	ONCE	+ 1' 10"
7	Angelo Lecchi (ITA)	Del Tongo	+ 1' 12"
8	Claudio Chiappucci (ITA)	Carrera Jeans–Vagabond	+ 1' 15"
9	Zenon Jaskuła (POL)	Diana–Colnago–Animex	+ 1' 17"
10	Federico Echave (ESP)	CLAS–Cajastur	+ 1' 18"

== Stage 5 ==
22 May 1990 — Sora to Teramo, 233 km (145 mi)

Stage 5 result

Rank	Rider	Team	Time
1	Fabrizio Convalle (ITA)	Amore & Vita–Fanini	5h 52' 11"
2	Andrei Tchmil (URS)	Alfa Lum	+ 4"
3	Gilbert Duclos-Lassalle (FRA)	Z–Tomasso	s.t.
4	Francesco Rossignoli (ITA)	Jolly Componibili–Club 88	s.t.
5	Roberto Pagnin (ITA)	Malvor–Sidi	s.t.
6	Massimo Podenzana (ITA)	Italbonifica–Navigare	s.t.
7	Rodolfo Massi (ITA)	Ariostea	s.t.
8	Maurizio Vandelli (ITA)	Gis Gelati–Benotto	s.t.
9	Francesco Cesarini (ITA)	Del Tongo	s.t.
10	Mario Chiesa (ITA)	Carrera Jeans–Vagabond	s.t.

General classification after Stage 5

Rank	Rider	Team	Time
1	Gianni Bugno (ITA)	Chateau d'Ax–Salotti	22h 15' 35"
2	Eduardo Chozas (ESP)	ONCE	+ 37"
3	Daniel Steiger (SUI)	Frank–Monte Tamaro	+ 57"
4	Laurent Fignon (FRA)	Castorama	+ 1' 08"
5	Joaquim Halupczok (POL)	Diana–Colnago–Animex	+ 1' 09"
6	Marino Lejarreta (ESP)	ONCE	+ 1' 10"
7	Angelo Lecchi (ITA)	Del Tongo	+ 1' 12"
8	Claudio Chiappucci (ITA)	Carrera Jeans–Vagabond	+ 1' 15"
9	Zenon Jaskuła (POL)	Diana–Colnago–Animex	+ 1' 17"
10	Federico Echave (ESP)	CLAS–Cajastur	+ 1' 18"

== Stage 6 ==
23 May 1990 — Teramo to Fabriano, 200 km (120 mi)

Stage 6 result

Rank	Rider	Team	Time
1	Luca Gelfi (ITA)	Del Tongo	5h 26' 16"
2	Massimo Ghirotto (ITA)	Carrera Jeans–Vagabond	s.t.
3	Phil Anderson (AUS)	TVM	s.t.
4	José Luis Villanueva (ESP)	ONCE	+ 6"
5	Giuseppe Saronni (ITA)	Diana–Colnago–Animex	+ 7"
6	Stefano Colagè (ITA)	Jolly Componibili–Club 88	s.t.
7	Dimitri Konyshev (URS)	Alfa Lum	s.t.
8	Laurent Fignon (FRA)	Castorama	s.t.
9	Claudio Chiappucci (ITA)	Carrera Jeans–Vagabond	s.t.
10	Gert-Jan Theunisse (NED)	Panasonic–Sportlife	s.t.

General classification after Stage 6

Rank	Rider	Team	Time
1	Gianni Bugno (ITA)	Chateau d'Ax–Salotti	27h 41' 09"
2	Eduardo Chozas (ESP)	ONCE	+ 37"
3	Daniel Steiger (SUI)	Frank–Monte Tamaro	+ 57"
4	Laurent Fignon (FRA)	Castorama	+ 1' 08"
5	Joaquim Halupczok (POL)	Diana–Colnago–Animex	+ 1' 09"
6	Marino Lejarreta (ESP)	ONCE	+ 1' 10"
7	Angelo Lecchi (ITA)	Del Tongo	+ 1' 12"
8	Claudio Chiappucci (ITA)	Carrera Jeans–Vagabond	+ 1' 15"
9	Zenon Jaskuła (POL)	Diana–Colnago–Animex	+ 1' 17"
10	Federico Echave (ESP)	CLAS–Cajastur	+ 1' 18"

== Stage 7 ==
24 May 1990 — Fabriano to Vallombrosa, 197 km (122 mi)

Stage 7 result

Rank	Rider	Team	Time
1	Gianni Bugno (ITA)	Chateau d'Ax–Salotti	5h 15' 23"
2	Piotr Ugrumov (URS)	Alfa Lum	s.t.
3	Charly Mottet (FRA)	RMO	+ 3"
4	Marino Lejarreta (ESP)	ONCE	s.t.
5	Federico Echave (ESP)	CLAS–Cajastur	s.t.
6	Joaquim Halupczok (POL)	Diana–Colnago–Animex	s.t.
7	Daniel Steiger (SUI)	Frank–Monte Tamaro	s.t.
8	Franco Chioccioli (ITA)	Del Tongo	s.t.
9	Éric Boyer (FRA)	Z–Tomasso	+ 9"
10	Michele Moro (ITA)	Italbonifica–Navigare	+ 50"

General classification after Stage 7

Rank	Rider	Team	Time
1	Gianni Bugno (ITA)	Chateau d'Ax–Salotti	32h 57' 09"
2	Daniel Steiger (SUI)	Frank–Monte Tamaro	+ 1' 12"
3	Joaquim Halupczok (POL)	Diana–Colnago–Animex	+ 1' 24"
4	Marino Lejarreta (ESP)	ONCE	+ 1' 25"
5	Federico Echave (ESP)	CLAS–Cajastur	+ 1' 33"
6	Piotr Ugrumov (URS)	Alfa Lum	+ 1' 40"
7	Charly Mottet (FRA)	RMO	+ 1' 47"
8	Franco Chioccioli (ITA)	Del Tongo	+ 2' 00"
9	Éric Boyer (FRA)	Z–Tomasso	+ 2' 03"
10	Eduardo Chozas (ESP)	ONCE	+ 2' 12"

== Stage 8 ==
25 May 1990 — Reggello to Marina di Pietrasanta, 188 km (117 mi)

Stage 8 result

Rank	Rider	Team	Time
1	Stefano Allocchio (ITA)	Italbonifica–Navigare	4h 32' 25"
2	Mario Cipollini (ITA)	Del Tongo	s.t.
3	Guido Bontempi (ITA)	Carrera Jeans–Vagabond	s.t.
4	Giovanni Fidanza (ITA)	Chateau d'Ax–Salotti	s.t.
5	Antonio Fanelli (ITA)	Selle Italia–Eurocar	s.t.
6	Paolo Rosola (ITA)	Gis Gelati–Benotto	s.t.
7	Giovanni Strazzer (ITA)	Malvor–Sidi	s.t.
8	Marcel Wüst (FRG)	RMO	s.t.
9	Giuseppe Citterio (ITA)	Malvor–Sidi	s.t.
10	Gianluca Bortolami (ITA)	Diana–Colnago–Animex	s.t.

General classification after Stage 8

Rank	Rider	Team	Time
1	Gianni Bugno (ITA)	Chateau d'Ax–Salotti	37h 29' 34"
2	Daniel Steiger (SUI)	Frank–Monte Tamaro	+ 1' 12"
3	Joaquim Halupczok (POL)	Diana–Colnago–Animex	+ 1' 24"
4	Marino Lejarreta (ESP)	ONCE	+ 1' 25"
5	Federico Echave (ESP)	CLAS–Cajastur	+ 1' 33"
6	Piotr Ugrumov (URS)	Alfa Lum	+ 1' 40"
7	Charly Mottet (FRA)	RMO	+ 1' 47"
8	Franco Chioccioli (ITA)	Del Tongo	+ 2' 00"
9	Éric Boyer (FRA)	Z–Tomasso	+ 2' 03"
10	Eduardo Chozas (ESP)	ONCE	+ 2' 12"

== Stage 9 ==
26 May 1990 — La Spezia to Langhirano, 176 km (109 mi)

Stage 9 result

Rank	Rider	Team	Time
1	Vladimir Poulnikov (URS)	Alfa Lum	5h 04' 15"
2	Dimitri Konyshev (URS)	Alfa Lum	+1' 39"
3	Phil Anderson (AUS)	TVM	s.t.
4	Claudio Chiappucci (ITA)	Carrera Jeans–Vagabond	s.t.
5	Eduardo Chozas (ESP)	ONCE	s.t.
6	Massimiliano Lelli (ITA)	Ariostea	+ 2' 26"
7	Marino Lejarreta (ESP)	ONCE	s.t.
8	Andrea Chiurato (ITA)	Amore & Vita–Fanini	s.t.
9	Angelo Lecchi (ITA)	Del Tongo	s.t.
10	Emanuele Bombini (ITA)	Diana–Colnago–Animex	s.t.

General classification after Stage 9

Rank	Rider	Team	Time
1	Gianni Bugno (ITA)	Chateau d'Ax–Salotti	42h 36' 15"
2	Joaquim Halupczok (POL)	Diana–Colnago–Animex	+ 1' 24"
3	Eduardo Chozas (ESP)	ONCE	+ 1' 25"
4	Marino Lejarreta (ESP)	ONCE	s.t.
5	Federico Echave (ESP)	CLAS–Cajastur	+ 1' 33"
6	Charly Mottet (FRA)	RMO	+ 1' 47"
7	Franco Chioccioli (ITA)	Del Tongo	+ 2' 00"
8	Claudio Chiappucci (ITA)	Carrera Jeans–Vagabond	s.t.
9	Piotr Ugrumov (URS)	Alfa Lum	+ 2' 13"
10	Vladimir Poulnikov (URS)	Alfa Lum	+ 2' 20"

== Stage 10 ==
27 May 1990 — Grinzane Cavour to Cuneo, 68 km (42 mi) (ITT)

Stage 10 result

Rank	Rider	Team	Time
1	Luca Gelfi (ITA)	Del Tongo	1h 31' 46"
2	Gianni Bugno (ITA)	Chateau d'Ax–Salotti	+ 6"
3	Lech Piasecki (POL)	Diana–Colnago–Animex	+ 57"
4	Phil Anderson (AUS)	TVM	+ 1' 40"
5	Marco Giovannetti (ITA)	Seur	+ 1' 45"
6	Thierry Marie (FRA)	Castorama	+ 1' 50"
7	Charly Mottet (FRA)	RMO	+ 2' 28"
8	Gérard Rué (FRA)	Castorama	s.t.
9	Stephen Hodge (AUS)	ONCE	+ 3' 00"
10	Vladimir Poulnikov (URS)	Alfa Lum	s.t.

General classification after Stage 10

Rank	Rider	Team	Time
1	Gianni Bugno (ITA)	Chateau d'Ax–Salotti	44h 08' 07"
2	Marco Giovannetti (ITA)	Seur	+ 4' 08"
3	Charly Mottet (FRA)	RMO	+ 4' 09"
4	Federico Echave (ESP)	CLAS–Cajastur	+ 4' 41"
5	Joaquim Halupczok (POL)	Diana–Colnago–Animex	+ 5' 06"
6	Vladimir Poulnikov (URS)	Alfa Lum	+ 5' 14"
7	Claudio Chiappucci (ITA)	Carrera Jeans–Vagabond	+ 5' 55"
8	Marino Lejarreta (ESP)	ONCE	+ 6' 02"
9	Piotr Ugrumov (URS)	Alfa Lum	+ 6' 43"
10	Flavio Giupponi (ITA)	Carrera Jeans–Vagabond	+ 6' 47"
