= 1990 Tirreno–Adriatico =

Race details
- Dates: 7–14 March 1990
- Stages: 8
- Distance: 1,040.5 km (646.5 mi)
- Winning time: 27h 29' 18"

Results
	Winner	Tony Rominger (SUI)	(Chateau d'Ax–Salotti)
	Second	Zenon Jaskuła (POL)	(Diana–Colnago–Animex)
	Third	Gilles Delion (FRA)	(Helvetia–La Suisse)

The 1990 Tirreno–Adriatico was the 25th edition of the Tirreno–Adriatico cycle race and was held from 7 March to 14 March 1990. The race started in Bacoli and finished in San Benedetto del Tronto. The race was won by Tony Rominger of the Chateau d'Ax team.

== General classification ==
Final general classification

Rank	Rider	Team	Time
1	Tony Rominger (SUI)	Chateau d'Ax–Salotti	27h 29' 18"
2	Zenon Jaskuła (POL)	Diana–Colnago–Animex	+ 2' 31"
3	Gilles Delion (FRA)	Helvetia–La Suisse	+ 2' 42"
4	Jean-Claude Leclercq (FRA)	Helvetia–La Suisse	+ 2' 46"
5	Maurizio Fondriest (ITA)	Del Tongo	+ 2' 46"
6	Sean Kelly (IRL)	PDM–Concorde–Ultima	+ 2' 58"
7	Frans Maassen (NED)	Buckler–Colnago–Decca	+ 2' 58"
8	Martin Earley (IRL)	PDM–Concorde–Ultima	+ 3' 12"
9	Daniel Steiger (SUI)	Frank–Toyo	+ 3' 22"
10	Luc Roosen (BEL)	Histor–Sigma	+ 3' 58"
