= Tour of Norway (1983–1992) =

Race details
- Region: Norway
- Discipline: Road
- Type: Stage race

History
- First edition: 1983
- Editions: 6
- Final edition: 1992
- First winner: Francesco Moser (ITA)
- Most wins: Dag Erik Pedersen (NOR) (2 wins)
- Final winner: Dag Otto Lauritzen (NOR)

The Tour of Norway was a multi-day road bicycle race held in Norway between 1983 and 1992, with the exception of 1986 to 1989.

== Winners ==
Year	Winner	Second	Third
1983	(Italy) Francesco Moser	(Sweden) Per Christiansson	(Sweden) Kjell Nilsson
1984	(Norway) Dag Erik Pedersen	(Norway) Atle Kvålsvoll	(Soviet Union) Sergei Ermatchenko
1985	(Netherlands) Henk Lubberding	(Norway) Olaf Lurvik	(Norway) Dag Erik Pedersen
1990	(Norway) Olaf Lurvik	(Norway) Dag Erik Pedersen	(East Germany) Mario Hernig
1991	(Norway) Dag Erik Pedersen	(Norway) Bjørn Stenersen	(Norway) Bo André Namvedt
1992	(Norway) Dag Otto Lauritzen	(Norway) Bjørn Stenersen	(Norway) Dag Erik Pedersen
