= Tour de la Mirabelle =

Race details
- Date: May-June
- Region: Lorraine, France
- Discipline: Road
- Competition: UCI Europe Tour
- Type: Stage race
- Web site: tourdelamirabelle.com

History
- First edition: 2002
- Editions: 22 (as of 2025)
- Most recent: Samuele Zoccarato (ITA)

The Tour de la Mirabelle is a multi-day road cycling race that has been held annually in Lorraine, France since 2002. It has been part of UCI Europe Tour in category 2.2 since 2019.

== Winners ==
Since 2010:

Year	Winner	Second	Third
Ronde du Piémont Vosgien
2010	(Sweden) Marcus Johansson	(France) Damien Fol	(France) Nicolas Ougier
2011	(Germany) David Bartl	(France) Nicolas Marchal	(Germany) Wolfgang Brandl
Tour du Piémont Vosgien
2012	(Estonia) Gert Jõeäär	(France) Romain Pillon	(Belgium) Anthony Pirlot
2013	(Belgium) Dimitri Claeys	(Belgium) Edward Theuns	(France) Samuel Plouhinec
2014	(Belgium) Jens Wallays	(Netherlands) Mike Terpstra	(Netherlands) Adriaan Janssen
2015	(Belgium) Aimé De Gendt	(Belgium) Gill Meheus	(France) Alexandre Gratiot
2016	(Belgium) Maxime De Poorter	(Belgium) Arjen Livyns	(Belgium) Benjamin Declercq
Tour de la Mirabelle
2017	(France) Pierre Idjouadiene	(France) Samuel Plouhinec	(Belgium) Aaron Van Poucke
2018	(France) Clément Penven	(Belgium) Viktor Verschaeve	(France) Fabien Canal
2019	(Switzerland) Simon Pellaud	(Belgium) Jordy Bouts	(Italy) Matteo Busato
2020	Cancelled		
2021	(Norway) Idar Andersen	(Netherlands) Sjoerd Bax	(Netherlands) Jan Maas
2022	(United Kingdom) Robert Scott	(United Kingdom) Matthew Bostock	(Switzerland) Simon Vitzthum
2023	(Belgium) Jonas Geens	(France) Clément Braz Afonso	(France) Tom Donnenwirth
2024	(France) Oscar Nilsson-Julien	(Netherlands) Jan-Willem van Schip	(Switzerland) Elia Blum
2025	(Italy) Samuele Zoccarato	(France) Lucas Bénéteau	(France) Victor Jean
