= Robin Seymour =

Robin Seymour may refer to:

- Robin Seymour (cyclist) (born 1971), Irish professional mountain bike racer and cyclocross racer
- Robin Seymour (DJ) (1928–2020), American radio and television personality and host
