= Paris–Chauny =

Cycle race in France

Race details
- Date: July
- Discipline: Road
- Competition: UCI Europe Tour
- Type: One day race
- Web site: www.paris-chauny.fr

History
- First edition: 1922
- Editions: 75 (as of 2025)
- First winner: Charles Lacquehay (FRA)
- Most wins: Benoît Daeninck (FRA) (2 wins)
- Most recent: Pavel Bittner (CZE)

Paris–Chauny is a one-day cycling race held in France. It was first held in 1922 and has been part of the UCI Europe Tour in category 1.2 since 2015 and 1.1 since 2018.

== Winners ==
Year	Winner	Second	Third
1922	(France) Charles Lacquehay	(France) Henri Pélissier	(France) Jean Brunier
1923	(France) José Pelletier	(France) Pierre Beffarat	(France) Marcel Colleu
1924	(France) Armand Van de Casteele	(France) Henri Pélissier	(France) Marcel Goddart
1925	(France) Alexis Blanc-Garin	(Belgium) Hector Martin	(France) Joseph Leblanc
1926	(France) Georges Bridier	(Belgium) Armand Lenoir	(France) Charles Fleury
1927	(France) Lucien Ghiste	Muts	(United States) Adam Ray
1928	(France) Octave Dayen	(France) Léon Bessières	(France) Marcel Duc
1930	(France) Léon Le Calvez	(France) François Moreels	(France) Jean Noret
1931	(France) Jean Noret	(France) Marcel Duc	(France) M. Brun
1932	(France) Philippe Bono	(France) Jean Noret	(France) Constant Camus
1933	(France) Sauveur Ducazeaux	(France) Jean Goujon	(France) Georges Naisse
1934	(France) Eugene Grenu	(France) Pierre Janvier	(France) Albert Carapezzi
1948	(France) Lebide		
1949	(France) Lucien Verdier		
1950	(France) André Denhez		
1951	(France) Henri Denhez		
1952	(France) A. Henry	(France) Mage	(France) Jacques Alix
1953	(France) Gwoinsky		
1954	(France) Bernard Daussin		
1955	(France) Maurice Munter		
1956	(France) Pierre Cornilleau		
1957	(France) Raymond Mastrotto		
1958	(France) Gilbert Loof		
1960	(France) Valentin Modric	(France) Michel Prissette	
1960	(France) Gilbert Loof	(France) Raymond Fayard	(France) Raymond Bralant
1980	(France) Guy Bricnet	(France) André Fossé	(France) Patrice Collinet
1981	(France) Patrice Collinet	(France) Jean-Marc Follet	(France) Bernard Stoessel
1982	(France) Claude Saelen	(France) Bernard Stoessel	(France) Philippe Miotti
1983	(United Kingdom) Piers Hewitt	(Canada) Ian Manson	(France) Franck Pineau
1984	(France) Claude Carlin	(France) Philippe Tesniere	(France) Jean-Luc Braillon
1985	(France) Thierry Casas	(Spain) Rusty López	(France) Daniel Maquet
1986	(France) Laurent Masson	(France) Philippe Brenner	(France) Patrice Malard
1987	(France) Marc Meilleur	(France) Marc Poncel	(France) Didier Champion
1988	(United States) Greg Oravetz	(France) Jean-Marie Corteggiani	(Republic of Ireland) Lawrence Roche
1989	(France) Philippe Lauraire	(France) Claude Carlin	(France) Jean-Cyril Robin
1990	(Norway) Olaf Lurvik	(France) Laurent Eudeline	(France) Jacques Dutailly
1991	(United Kingdom) John Hugues	(United States) Matt Newberry	(Republic of Ireland) Paul Slane
1992	(Poland) Adam Szafron	(Poland) Czeslaw Rajch	(France) Bruno Thibout
1993	(France) Frédéric Pontier	(France) Emmanuel Mallet	(France) Ludovic Auger
1994	(Canada) Gordon Fraser	(France) Edouard Terrier	(France) Frédéric Gabriel
1995	(France) Franck Morelle	(France) Jean-Claude Thilloy	(France) Jérôme Leroyer
1996	(France) Jean-François Lafille	(France) Herve Henriet	(France) Vicent Templier
1997	(France) Florent Brard	(France) Vincent Klaes	(France) Arnaud Auguste
1998	(France) Jean-Michel Thilloy	(France) Mickael Fouland	(France) Vincent Templier
1999	(France) Franck Morelle	(France) Stéphane Augé	(France) Jean-Claude Thilloy
2000	(Finland) Mika Hietanen	(Poland) Mickael Olejnik	(France) Sylvain Lajoie
2001	(France) Christophe Guillome	(France) Tony Cavet	(France) Cédric Loue
2002	(Belarus) Aleksei Levdanski	(France) Mickaël Buffaz	(Japan) Shinichi Fukushima
2003	(France) Pascal Carlot	(France) David Pagnier	(France) Stépahne Pétilleau
2006	(France) Guillaume Lejeune	(France) Franck Charrier	(France) Thomas Nosari
2007	(Poland) Tomasz Smoleń	(Poland) Mateusz Taciak	(France) Kévin Lalouette
2008	(France) Tony Cavet	(France) Martial Locatelli	(Poland) Mateusz Taciak
2009	(France) Benoît Daeninck	(Estonia) Sander Maasing	(France) Guillaume Malle
2011	(France) Grégory Barteau	(Poland) Mickael Olejnik	(France) Emilien Clere
2012	(Estonia) Gert Jõeäär	(France) Jimmy Turgis	(France) Benoît Sinner
2013	(France) Benoît Daeninck	(France) Yann Guyot	(Switzerland) Simon Pellaud
2014	(France) Marc Sarreau	(France) Marc Fournier	(France) Flavien Dassonville
2015	(Belgium) Maxime Vantomme	(France) Ronan Racault	(Italy) Alberto Cecchin
2016	(Belgium) Dieter Bouvry	(Australia) Anthony Giacoppo	(France) Kévin Le Cunff
2017	(France) Thomas Boudat	(Belgium) Grégory Habeaux	(France) Anthony Turgis
2018	(Netherlands) Ramon Sinkeldam	(New Zealand) Dion Smith	(France) Quentin Jaurégui
2019	(France) Anthony Turgis	(United States) Robin Carpenter	(France) Nans Peters
2020	(France) Nacer Bouhanni	(Germany) Alexander Krieger	(Netherlands) Danny van Poppel
2021	(Belgium) Jasper Philipsen	(Italy) Alberto Dainese	(Italy) Andrea Pasqualon
2022	(Italy) Simone Consonni	(Netherlands) Dylan Groenewegen	(France) Jason Tesson
2023	(Belgium) Jasper Philipsen	(France) Jason Tesson	(France) Paul Penhoët
2024	(France) Arnaud Démare	(France) Paul Penhoët	(Belgium) Milan Fretin
2025	(Belgium) Arnaud De Lie	(Germany) Max Kanter	(Slovakia) Lukáš Kubiš
2026	(Czech Republic) Pavel Bittner	(Belgium) Lionel Taminiaux	(Germany) Tobias Müller
