= 1990 Tour de Suisse =

Race details
- Dates: 13–22 June 1990
- Stages: 11
- Distance: 1,859 km (1,155 mi)
- Winning time: 48h 10' 42"

Results
	Winner	Sean Kelly (IRL)	(PDM–Concorde–Ultima)
	Second	Robert Millar (GBR)	(Z–Tomasso)
	Third	Andrew Hampsten (USA)	(7-Eleven)
	Points	Sean Kelly (IRL)	(PDM–Concorde–Ultima)
	Mountains	Robert Millar (GBR)	(Z–Tomasso)
	Combination	Stephan Joho (SUI)	(Ariostea)
	Team	Frank-Toyo	

The 1990 Tour de Suisse was the 54th edition of the Tour de Suisse cycle race and was held from 13 June to 22 June 1990. The race started in Winterthur and finished in Zürich. The race was won by Sean Kelly of the PDM team.

== General classification ==
Final general classification

Rank	Rider	Team	Time
1	Sean Kelly (IRL)	PDM–Concorde–Ultima	48h 10' 42"
2	Robert Millar (GBR)	Z–Tomasso	+ 41"
3	Andrew Hampsten (USA)	7-Eleven	+ 1' 04"
4	Daniel Steiger (SUI)	Frank-Toyo	+ 1' 13"
5	Zenon Jaskuła (POL)	Diana–Colnago–Animex	+ 2' 17"
6	Atle Kvålsvoll (NOR)	Z–Tomasso	+ 3' 08"
7	Eddy Bouwmans (NED)	Panasonic–Sportlife	+ 3' 39"
8	Laurent Madouas (FRA)	Z–Tomasso	+ 5' 19"
9	Marco Vitali (ITA)	Frank-Toyo	+ 5' 44"
10	Greg LeMond (USA)	Z–Tomasso	+ 5' 54"
