= Martin Earley =

Irish cyclist

Personal information
- Born: 15 June 1962 (age 64) Clonshaugh, Dublin, Ireland
- Height: 1.73 m (5 ft 8 in)
- Weight: 62 kg (137 lb)

Cycling career
- Sport: Cycling
- Current team: Retired
- Discipline: Road
- Role: Rider

Amateur team
- 1983–1984: VC Fontainebleau

Professional teams
- 1985–1987: Fagor
- 1988: Kas–Canal 10
- 1989–1992: PDM–Ultima–Concorde
- 1993: Festina–Lotus
- 1994–1995: Raleigh Continental

Major wins
- Grand Tours Tour de France 1 individual stage (1989) Giro d'Italia 1 individual stage (1986) One-day races and Classics National Road Race Championships (1994)

Martin Earley (born 15 June 1962) is an Irish former professional road bicycle racer, who competed in the 1984 and 1996 Olympic Games.

== Racing career ==
He turned professional in 1985 with the Fagor team with whom he stayed until 1987. In 1986 he won the 14th stage of the Giro d'Italia and the second of the Tour of the Basque Country. In 1987, he was part of the Irish team at the world road championship that ended with a win by Stephen Roche. After that he rode for Kas and then the Dutch PDM team of Sean Kelly. The highlight of his career was a stage win in the 1989 Tour de France when he broke clear of three riders 750m from the end of 157 km from Labastide-d'Armagnac to Pau. Earley completed five of his eight Tours; his highest finish was 44th in 1989.

After PDM left the sport, he rode for Festina, then switched to mountain biking by riding for Raleigh and then for individual sponsors. He competed in the 1996 Olympic Games in Atlanta in the mountain bike race and finished 25th.

== Career after racing ==
He has a practice as a physiotherapist and chiropractor. He has been a coach to cyclists, including Irish Olympians Robin Seymour and Tarja Owens.

== Public art ==
In 2023, Earley's image was used as part of the Dublin Canvas Public Art Project. Designer Con Kennedy painted the electrical exchange box depicting Earley's 1986 Giro d'Italia win on stage 14.

== Career achievements ==
=== Major results ===
1978
1st Overall Junior Tour of Ireland
1981
1st Shay Elliott Memorial Race
1982
3rd Overall Rás Tailteann

1st Stage 4

1985
4th Paris–Camembert
9th Overall Étoile de Bessèges
1986
1st Stage 14 Giro d'Italia
8th Overall Tour of the Basque Country

1st Stage 2

10th Overall Nissan Classic
1987
3rd Overall Tour du Haut-Var
5th Overall Tour of the Basque Country

1st Stage 3

6th Overall Nissan Classic
1988
6th Overall Nissan Classic
10th Liège–Bastogne–Liège
10th GP Ouest–France
1989
1st Stage 8 Tour de France
Tour du Vaucluse

1st Stages 1 & 4

4th Overall Kellogg's Tour
7th Road race, UCI Road World Championships
9th Giro di Lombardia
1990
8th Overall Tirreno–Adriatico
9th Liège–Bastogne–Liège
1991
1st Stage 1 Tour of Galicia
3rd Grand Prix des Amériques
3rd Rund um den Henninger Turm
10th Overall Nissan Classic
10th Druivenkoers Overijse
10th Trofeo Luis Puig
1992
7th Overall Kellogg's Tour
7th Züri-Metzgete
9th Overall Nissan Classic
1993
6th Overall Tour Méditerranéen
1994
1st Road race, National Road Championships
