= 1989 GP Ouest-France =

Race details
- Dates: 22 August 1989
- Stages: 1
- Distance: 250 km (155.3 mi)
- Winning time: 6h 15' 06"

Results
	Winner	Jean-Claude Colotti (FRA)	(RMO)
	Second	Bruno Cornillet (FRA)	(Z–Peugeot)
	Third	Gilles Delion (FRA)	(Helvetia–La Suisse)

The 1989 GP Ouest-France was the 53rd edition of the GP Ouest-France cycle race and was held on 22 August 1989. The race started and finished in Plouay. The race was won by Jean-Claude Colotti of the RMO team.

== General classification ==
Final general classification

Rank	Rider	Team	Time
1	Jean-Claude Colotti (FRA)	RMO	6h 15' 06"
2	Bruno Cornillet (FRA)	Z–Peugeot	+ 0"
3	Gilles Delion (FRA)	Helvetia–La Suisse	+ 5"
4	Atle Kvålsvoll (NOR)	Z–Peugeot	+ 7"
5	Thomas Wegmüller (SUI)	Domex–Weinmann	+ 12"
6	Dominique Garde (FRA)	Super U–Raleigh–Fiat	+ 37"
7	Pascal Poisson (FRA)	Toshiba	+ 1' 46"
8	Thierry Claveyrolat (FRA)	RMO	+ 2' 59"
9	Martial Gayant (FRA)	Toshiba	+ 3' 52"
10	Jos van Aert (NED)	Hitachi	+ 3' 52"
