= 1987 Tour du Haut Var =

Race details
- Dates: 20–21 February 1987
- Stages: 2
- Distance: 316 km (196.4 mi)
- Winning time: 8h 09' 17"

Results
	Winner	Rolf Gölz (FRG)
	Second	Ronan Pensec (FRA)
	Third	Martin Earley (IRL)

The 1987 Tour du Haut Var was the 19th edition of the Tour du Haut Var cycle race and was held on 20–21 February 1987. The race started in Fréjus and finished in Seillans. The race was won by Rolf Gölz.

== General classification ==
Final general classification

Rank	Rider	Time
1	Rolf Gölz (FRG)	8h 09' 17"
2	Ronan Pensec (FRA)	+ 6"
3	Martin Earley (IRL)	+ 9"
4	Marc Sergeant (BEL)	+ 9"
5	Jean-Claude Bagot (FRA)	+ 9"
6	Gilles Sanders (FRA)	+ 9"
7	Marc van Orsouw (NED)	+ 9"
8	Yvon Madiot (FRA)	+ 12"
9	Luc Roosen (BEL)	+ 12"
10	Éric Boyer (FRA)	+ 14"
