= Gran Premio di Lugano =

Swiss one-day road cycling race

Race details
- Date: Early-March
- Region: Lugano, Switzerland
- English name: Grand Prix of Lugano
- Local name: Gran Premio di Lugano (in Italian)
- Discipline: Road
- Competition: UCI Europe Tour
- Type: Single-day
- Organiser: Velo Club Lugano
- Web site: www.veloclublugano.ch

History
- Editions: 74 (as of 2021)
- First winner: Josef Fuchs (SUI)
- Most wins: Marco Vitali (ITA) (3 wins)
- Most recent: Gianni Moscon (ITA)

The Gran Premio di Lugano (English: Grand Prix of Lugano) is a road bicycle race held annually in Lugano, Switzerland. Prior to 1981 it was held as an individual time trial but in recent years it has been organised as a 1.1 event on the UCI Europe Tour. In 2013, the race was cancelled due to snowfall.

== Lugano, Chrono ==
Year	Country	Rider	Team
1950	Switzerland	Ferdinand Kübler	Tebag
1951	Italy	Fausto Coppi	Bianchi–Pirelli
1952	Italy	Fausto Coppi	Bianchi–Pirelli
1953	France	Jacques Anquetil	La Perle–Hutchinson
1954	France	Jacques Anquetil	La Perle–Hutchinson
1955	Switzerland	Rolf Graf	Tebag
1956	Italy	Fausto Coppi	Carpano–Coppi
1957	Italy	Ercole Baldini	Legnano
1958	France	Jacques Anquetil	Helyett–Leroux–Hutchinson
1959	France	Jacques Anquetil	Helyett–Leroux–Hutchinson
1960	France	Jacques Anquetil	Helyett–Leroux–Fynsec
1961	France	Jacques Anquetil	Helyett–Fynsec-Hutchinson
1962	Switzerland	Rolf Graf	Tigra
1963	France	Raymond Poulidor	Mercier–BP–Hutchinson
1964	Belgium	Ferdinand Bracke	Peugeot–BP–Englebert
1965	France	Jacques Anquetil	Ford France–Gitane
1966	Italy	Vittorio Adorni	Salvarani
1967	Italy	Felice Gimondi	Salvarani
1968	Belgium	Eddy Merckx	Faema
1969	West Germany	Rudi Altig	Salvarani
1970	Denmark	Ole Ritter	Germanvox–Wega
1971	Spain	Luis Ocaña	Bic
1972; 1973	No race		
1974	Denmark	Ole Ritter	Filotex
1975	Netherlands	Roy Schuiten	TI–Raleigh
1976; 1977	No race		
1978	Netherlands	Joop Zoetemelk	Miko–Mercier–Hutchinson
1979	France	Michel Laurent	Peugeot–Esso–Michelin

== GP di Lugano ==
Year	Country	Rider	Team
1981	Switzerland	Josef Fuchs	
1982	Italy	Marco Vitali	
1983	Great Britain	Chris Wreghitt	Bianchi
1984	Switzerland	Benno Wiss	
1985	Switzerland	Gody Schmutz	Garage Neuburg
1986	Switzerland	Mauro Gianetti	Cilo–Aufina
1987	Switzerland	Thomas Wegmüller	Kas
1988	Italy	Marco Vitali	Atala–Ofmega
1989	France	Gilles Delion	Helvetia–La Suisse
1990	Italy	Marco Vitali	Frank–Toyo
1991	Switzerland	Pascal Jaccard	
1992	Germany	Steffen Rein	
1993	Italy	Roberto Caruso	ZG Mobili
1994	Italy	Andrea Chiurato	Mapei–CLAS
1995	Italy	Stefano Colagè	ZG Mobili–Selle Italia
1996	Italy	Amilcare Tronca	Scrigno–Blue Storm
1997	Italy	Michele Rezzani	
1998	Italy	Luca Bianucci	
1999; 2000	No race		
2001	Italy	Luca Paolini	Mapei–Quick-Step
2002	Moldova	Ruslan Ivanov	Alessio
2003	France	David Moncoutié	Cofidis
2004	France	Frédéric Bessy	Cofidis
2005	Belgium	Rik Verbrugghe	Quick-Step–Innergetic
2006	Italy	Paolo Bettini	Quick-Step–Innergetic
2007	Italy	Luca Mazzanti	Ceramica Panaria–Navigare
2008	Italy	Rinaldo Nocentini	Ag2r–La Mondiale
2009	France	Rémi Pauriol	Cofidis
2010	Italy	Roberto Ferrari	De Rosa–Stac Plastic
2011	Italy	Ivan Basso	Liquigas–Cannondale
2012	Italy	Eros Capecchi	Liquigas–Cannondale
2013	No race due to snow		
2014	Italy	Mauro Finetto	Yellow Fluo
2015	Italy	Niccolò Bonifazio	Lampre–Merida
2016	Italy	Sonny Colbrelli	Bardiani–CSF
2017	Italy	Iuri Filosi	Nippo–Vini Fantini
2018	Austria	Hermann Pernsteiner	Bahrain–Merida
2019	Italy	Diego Ulissi	UAE Team Emirates
2020	No race due to COVID-19 pandemic		
2021	Italy	Gianni Moscon	Ineos Grenadiers
