= Grand Prix Guillaume Tell =

Cycling race in Switzerland

Race details
- Date: August
- Region: Switzerland
- Discipline: Road race
- Competition: UCI Europe Tour
- Type: Stage race
- Web site: www.gp-tell.ch/home.shtml

History
- First edition: 1971
- Editions: 36
- Final edition: 2009
- First winner: Fritz Wehrli (SUI)
- Most wins: Peter Verbeken (BEL); Guido Winterberg (SUI) (2 wins)
- Final winner: Mathias Frank (SUI)

The Grand Prix Guillaume Tell (French pronunciation: [ɡʁɑ̃ pʁi ɡijom tɛl]; "William Tell Grand Prize") was a professional cycling race held annually in Switzerland. It was part of UCI Europe Tour in category 2.2U. In 2007, the race was part of the UCI Under 23 Nations' Cup.

== Winners ==
Year	Winner	Second	Third
1971	(Switzerland) Fritz Wehrli	(Soviet Union) Dimitri Trischin	(Soviet Union) Aleksandre Gusiatnikov
1972	(United Kingdom) Dave Lloyd	(Spain) José Luis Viejo	(Poland) Jerzy Zwyrko
1973	(France) Guy Leleu	(West Germany) Johan Ruch	(Soviet Union) Nikolay Gorelov
1974	(Switzerland) Werner Fretz	(Switzerland) Michel Kuhn	(Soviet Union) Said Gouiseinov
1975	(Denmark) Jørgen Marcussen	(Soviet Union) Aleksandre Gusiatnikov	(Czechoslovakia) Miroslav Sykora
1976	(Italy) Roberto Ceruti	(Switzerland) Bruno Wolfer	(Switzerland) Richard Trinkler
1977	(Switzerland) Gilbert Glaus	(Italy) Claudio Corti	(Czechoslovakia) Jiri Bartolsic
1978	(Switzerland) Kurt Ehrensperger	(Belgium) Fons de Wolf	(Switzerland) Richard Trinkler
1979	(Switzerland) Richard Trinkler	(Switzerland) Daniel Muller	(Italy) Fausto Stiz
1980	(Italy) Mariano Polini	(Switzerland) Helmut Wechselberger	(Switzerland) Jürh Luchs
1981	(Norway) Dag Erik Pedersen	(Colombia) José Patrocinio Jiménez	(France) Etienne Neant
1982	(Switzerland) Niki Rüttimann	(Switzerland) Urs Zimmermann	(Switzerland) Richard Trinkler
1983	(Switzerland) Richard Trinkler	(Switzerland) Heinz Imboden	(Czechoslovakia) Vladimir Dolek
1984	(Switzerland) Guido Winterberg	(West Germany) Peter Hilse	(Switzerland) Heinz Imboden
1985	(Switzerland) Pascal Richard	(Soviet Union) Riho Suun	(Australia) Stephen Hodge
1986	(Switzerland) Heinz Imboden	(Switzerland) Guido Winterberg	(Switzerland) Arno Küttel
1987	(Switzerland) Guido Winterberg	(Switzerland) Bernard Gavillet	(Switzerland) Pascal Richard
1988	(Switzerland) Fabian Fuchs	(Colombia) Alirio Chizabas	(France) Laurent Madouas
1989	(Switzerland) Karl Kälin	(Switzerland) Daniel Steiger	(West Germany) Josef Holzmann
1990	(Switzerland) Werner Stutz	(Denmark) Peter Meinert	(Switzerland) Roland Meier
1991	(Switzerland) Alex Zülle	(Switzerland) Beat Zberg	(Australia) Patrick Jonker
1992	(Switzerland) Dieter Runkel	(Switzerland) Roland Meier	(Netherlands) Erik Dekker
1993	(Belgium) Peter Verbeken	(Switzerland) André Wernli	(Switzerland) Daniel Lanz
1994	No race		
1995	(Belgium) Peter Verbeken	(Italy) Manuele Scopsi	(Denmark) Nicolaj Bo Larsen
1996	(Italy) Andrea Dolci	(Switzerland) Oscar Camenzind	(Spain) Marcelino García
1997	(Switzerland) Oscar Camenzind	(Switzerland) Niki Aebersold	(Switzerland) Armin Meier
1998	(Italy) Marco Velo	(Italy) Daniele Nardello	(Switzerland) Fabian Jeker
1999	No race		
2000	(Belgium) Jurgen Van Goolen	(Belgium) Nico Sijmens	(Netherlands) Remmert Wielinga
2001	(Sweden) Emil Arnell	(Ukraine) Yaroslav Popovych	(Italy) Cristian Tosoni
2002	(Denmark) Rasmus Dyring	(Sweden) Gustav Erik Larsson	(Switzerland) Grégory Rast
2003	(Russia) Vladimir Gusev	(Slovenia) Tomaž Nose	(Switzerland) Florian Stalder
2004	(Slovenia) Tomaž Nose	(Slovenia) Janez Brajkovič	(Luxembourg) Andy Schleck
2005	No race		
2006	(Austria) Markus Eibegger	(Slovakia) Peter Velits	(Slovenia) Miha Svab
2007	(Latvia) Gatis Smukulis	(Denmark) Jakob Fuglsang	(France) Jérôme Coppel
2008	(Russia) Timofey Kritskiy	(Colombia) Jarlinson Pantano	(France) Jocelyn Bar
2009	(Switzerland) Mathias Frank	(Germany) Nico Schneider	(Hungary) Péter Kusztor
