= Tarja Owens =

Irish cyclist

Tarja Owens (from Delgany, County Wicklow, Ireland), is an Irish former competitive mountain biker and road racer, who competed in the Sydney Olympic Games of 2000 and later became the first female professional Irish cyclist.

== Career ==
=== Early career ===
Owens comes from Delgany, near Greystones, Co. Wicklow. Her uncle, Peter Doyle, was an active international competitive cyclist.

She was Irish Ladies mountain biking champion six times, and rode in a range of national and international MTB and road races, including stage events and the World Championships. She was then selected to ride at the Sydney Olympic Games, with funding of 3000 euro a year from the Sports Council and earnings as a gym instructor.

After the 2000 Olympics, Owens decided to pursue a professional road racing career, and moved from the Helly Hansen team to accept an offer from the Michaela Fanini team for the 2001 season, making her Ireland's first professional female cyclist (one or two cyclists had earlier been offered posts but had remained amateur). She was coached by Martin Earley, and stayed with the team for 18 months, being selected to ride in the Giro d'Italia in her first year.

With her then partner Robin Seymour, Ireland's top-ranked mountain biker, Owens competed in, and won, the mixed category of the seven-day 2005 TransRockies Challenge.

=== Later career ===
Owens started a mountain bike touring business in northern Italy with her partner Niall Davis in 2010. They later opened biking.ie, a business operating mountain bike events at Ticknock in south Dublin and near Roundwood in Wicklow. They married in 2017, and have two children.

Owens qualified as an osteopath in 2012 and is owner and lead operator of Roundwood Osteopathy and Sports Clinic.
