= 1989 Giro di Lombardia =

1989 UCI Road World Cup, race 12 of 12

Race details
- Dates: 14 October 1989
- Stages: 1
- Distance: 260 km (161.6 mi)
- Winning time: 6h 46' 35"

Results
	Winner	Tony Rominger (SUI)	(Chateau d'Ax)
	Second	Gilles Delion (FRA)	(Helvetia–La Suisse)
	Third	Luc Roosen (BEL)	(Histor–Sigma)

The 1989 Giro di Lombardia was the 83rd edition of the Giro di Lombardia cycle race and was held on 14 October 1989. The race started in Como and finished at the Piazza del Duomo in Milan. The race was won by Tony Rominger of the Chateau d'Ax team.

== General classification ==
Final general classification

Rank	Rider	Team	Time
1	Tony Rominger (SUI)	Chateau d'Ax	6h 46' 35"
2	Gilles Delion (FRA)	Helvetia–La Suisse	+ 2' 33"
3	Luc Roosen (BEL)	Histor–Sigma	+ 2' 34"
4	Raúl Alcalá (MEX)	PDM–Ultima–Concorde	+ 4' 06"
5	Roberto Pagnin (ITA)	Malvor–Sidi	+ 4' 06"
6	Patrick Robeet (BEL)	Domex–Weinmann	+ 4' 06"
7	Marcello Siboni (ITA)	Ariostea	+ 4' 06"
8	Rolf Gölz (FRG)	Superconfex–Yoko–Opel–Colnago	+ 4' 33"
9	Martin Earley (IRL)	PDM–Ultima–Concorde	+ 4' 33"
10	Franco Ballerini (ITA)	Malvor–Sidi	+ 4' 33"
