= Gilles Delion =

French cyclist

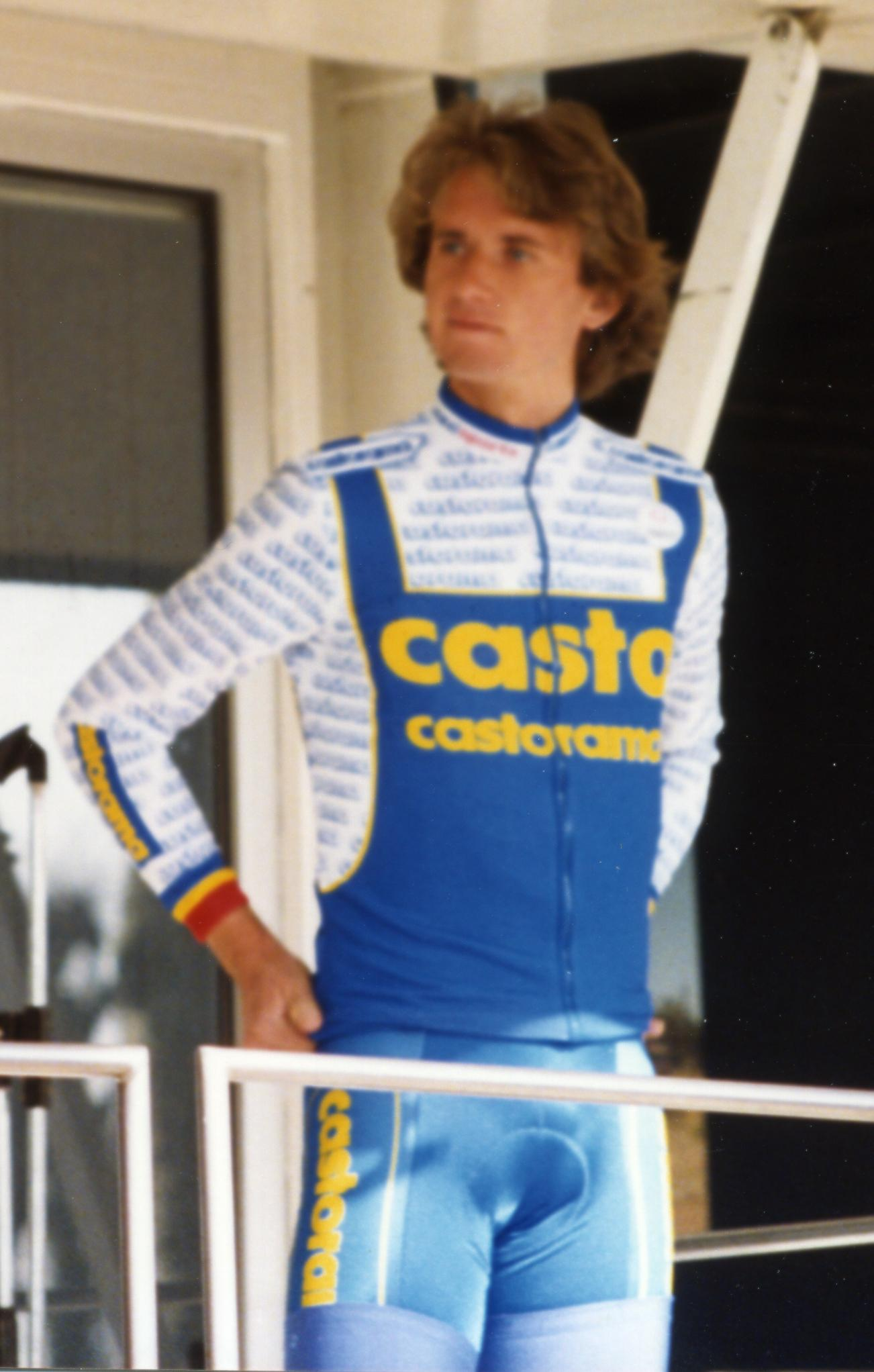
- Delion at the 1993 Paris–Nice

Personal information
- Full name: Gilles Delion
- Born: 5 August 1966 (age 60) Saint-Étienne, France

Cycling career
- Sport: Cycling
- Current team: Retired
- Discipline: Road
- Role: Rider

Professional teams
- 1988: Weinmann–La Suisse–SMM Uster
- 1989–1992: Helvetia–La Suisse
- 1993–1994: Castorama
- 1995: Chazal–König
- 1996: Aki–Gipiemme

Major wins
- Grand Tours Tour de France Young rider classification (1990) 1 individual stage (1992) One-day races and Classics Giro di Lombardia (1990)

Gilles Delion (born 5 August 1966) is a French former road bicycle racer. His greatest achievements include winning the Giro di Lombardia in 1990 and the young rider classification in the 1990 Tour de France.

== Biography ==
Delion was born on 5 August 1966 in Saint-Étienne and was a professional cyclist from 1988 to 1996. Having placed eighteenth as an amateur at the 1988 Critérium du Dauphiné Libéré, he was offered professional contracts, including from Cyrille Guimard to join the Système U squad, before signing with Weinmann–La Suisse–SMM Uster Helvetia.

Delion won the GP Lugano in his debut season in 1989 and had a second place overall at the 1989 Tour de Romandie and a good showing at the GP Plouay and was selected to represent France at the 1989 World Championships as a domestique. Delion placed second at the 1989 Giro di Lombardia behind Swiss rider Tony Rominger.

Delion placed third overall at the 1990 Tirreno-Adriatico, and also placed third at 1990 Milan-San Remo, won by Gianni Bugno, before beating Laurent Fignon in the hilltop stage at Critérium International. In his debut in the race at the 1990 Tour de France, he finished 15th overall and won the best young rider classification. Having had podium places at Milan-Turin, the Giro del Lazio and Giro dell’Emilia in the autumn of 1990, he won the 1990 Giro di Lombardia ahead of Helvetia teammate Pascal Richard and a small group containing Federico Echave, Robert Millar and Charly Mottet.

Delion's 1991 spring classics campaign was wiped out by mononucleosis. Delion placed 21st at the 1991 Tour de France. He won a stage ahead of Stephen Roche from Brussels to Valkenburg at the 1992 Tour de France, where he finished 58th overall. He also won the Classique des Alpes in 1992. At the end of 1992, when Helvetia disbanded, he moved to Castorama, managed by Guimard. In 1994, he won the Grand Prix de l’Ouverture. He was eliminated after finishing outside the time limit on stage 13 during his fourth and final participation at the 1994 Tour de France.

Delion ended his career in 1996, saying that at that point doping was widespread in the cycling peloton, and that all French teams were involved. Willy Voet wrote in his book "Massacre à la chaîne" that Delion was against doping, and that other cyclists ridiculed Delion for that.

After retiring from road cycling he competed in mountain biking. He later worked in sales in Chambéry, and served as vice-president of Chambéry Cyclisme Formation (CFF). In 2013, Delion joined the board of the UCI’s Professional Cycling Council.

== Major results ==
1988
3rd Overall Ronde de l'Isard
3rd Grand Prix des Amériques
1989
1st Gran Premio di Lugano
2nd Overall Tour de Romandie
2nd Giro di Lombardia
3rd GP Ouest–France
7th Giro dell'Emilia
7th Milano–Torino
1990
1st Young rider classification, Tour de France
1st Giro di Lombardia
2nd Overall Critérium International

1st Stage 2

2nd Giro dell'Emilia
2nd Giro del Lazio
3rd Overall Tirreno–Adriatico
3rd Milan–San Remo
3rd Milano–Torino
5th UCI Road World Cup
9th Züri-Metzgete
1991
4th Wincanton Classic
9th Overall Tour Méditerranéen
1992
1st Classique des Alpes
1st Stage 7 Tour de France
3rd Grand Prix La Marseillaise
4th Overall Tour Méditerranéen
1993
Mi-Août Bretonne

1st Stages 3 & 8

3rd Overall Tour du Limousin
5th Overall Tour Méditerranéen
10th Giro dell'Emilia
1994
1st Grand Prix de Rennes
1st Grand Prix d'Ouverture La Marseillaise
2nd Overall Tour de l'Ain

1st Stage 2
