= Laurence Roche =

Irish competitive cyclist

Personal information
- Born: 15 October 1967 (age 59) Dublin, Ireland

Cycling career
- Sport: Cycling
- Current team: Retired

Amateur team
- 1988: AC Boulogne - Billancourt

Professional teams
- 1989–1990: Carrera Jeans–Vagabond
- 1991: Tonton Tapis–GB

Laurence Roche (also written as Lawrence Roche) (born 15 October 1967) is a former professional Irish road racing cyclist. He was a professional from 1989 to 1991, where he rode for the Carrera Jeans–Vagabond for two years and then for Tonton Tapis–GB team in 1991 where he rode the Tour de France for the only time in his career.

== Career ==
During the 1991 Tour de France, he raced on the same team as his famous brother, Stephen Roche. Stephen was disqualified on the second stage of the race after failing to make the time limit when he missed the start time of the team time trial. Several days later, Lawrence went on a long solo breakaway. Roche would finish his only tour in 153rd place. Roche was forced to retire at the end of the 1991 season after his team could not find a sponsor for the 1992 season. Roche initially signed on for the 1992 season before his team folded.

In 2002, he was back to racing after a two-year break and he won the Dunboyne 3 day race. In 2008, Roche competed in the FBD Insurance Ras.

== Major results ==
1987
1st Jard-Les Herbiers
1988
1st Ronde du Pays Basque
3rd Circuit de la Vallee Loire
3rd Paris-Chauny
1991
8th Ronde des Pyrénées
