= Tonton Tapis–GB =

Team information
- Registered: Belgium
- Founded: 1991
- Disbanded: 1991
- Discipline: Road

Key personnel
- General manager: Roger De Vlaeminck; Marcel Van der Slagmolen

Team name history
- 1991: Tonton Tapis–GB
Tonton Tapis–GB jersey
Jersey

Tonton Tapis–GB was a Belgian professional cycling team that existed in 1991. The team participated in the 1991 Tour de France.

== Team roster ==
The following is a list of riders on the Tonton Tapis–GB squad during the 1991 season, with age given for 1 January 1991.

Rider	Date of birth
Erwin Biets (BEL)	5 May 1968 (aged 22)
Laurent Biondi (FRA)	19 June 1959 (aged 31)
Marc Bouillon (BEL)	15 June 1968 (aged 22)
John Carlsen (DEN)	31 December 1961 (aged 29)
Jean-Claude Colotti (FRA)	1 July 1961 (aged 29)
Gino de Backer (BEL)	9 January 1963 (aged 27)
Klaus De Muynck (BEL)	18 May 1967 (aged 23)
Dirk De Wolf (BEL)	16 January 1961 (aged 29)
Laurent Desbiens (FRA)	16 September 1969 (aged 21)
Rudi Dexters (BEL)	29 January 1959 (aged 31)
Patrick Jacobs (BEL)	25 July 1962 (aged 28)
Vincent Lacressonnière (FRA)	20 March 1967 (aged 23)
Francis Moreau (FRA)	21 July 1965 (aged 25)

Rider	Date of birth
Atle Pedersen (NOR)	29 July 1964 (aged 26)
Chris Peers (BEL)	3 March 1970 (aged 20)
William Perard (FRA)	17 August 1966 (aged 24)
Laurent Pillon (FRA)	31 March 1964 (aged 26)
Didier Priem (BEL)	16 September 1969 (aged 21)
Laurence Roche (IRE)	15 October 1967 (aged 23)
Stephen Roche (IRE)	28 November 1959 (aged 31)
Patrick Roelandt (BEL)	21 September 1962 (aged 28)
Noël Szostek (BEL)	23 December 1966 (aged 24)
Jan Van Camp (BEL)	28 September 1961 (aged 29)
Caspar van der Meer (NED)	23 October 1965 (aged 25)
Kurt Van Keirsbulck (BEL)	1 October 1965 (aged 25)
David Windels (BEL)	27 August 1969 (aged 21)
