= Laurent Pillon =

French cyclist

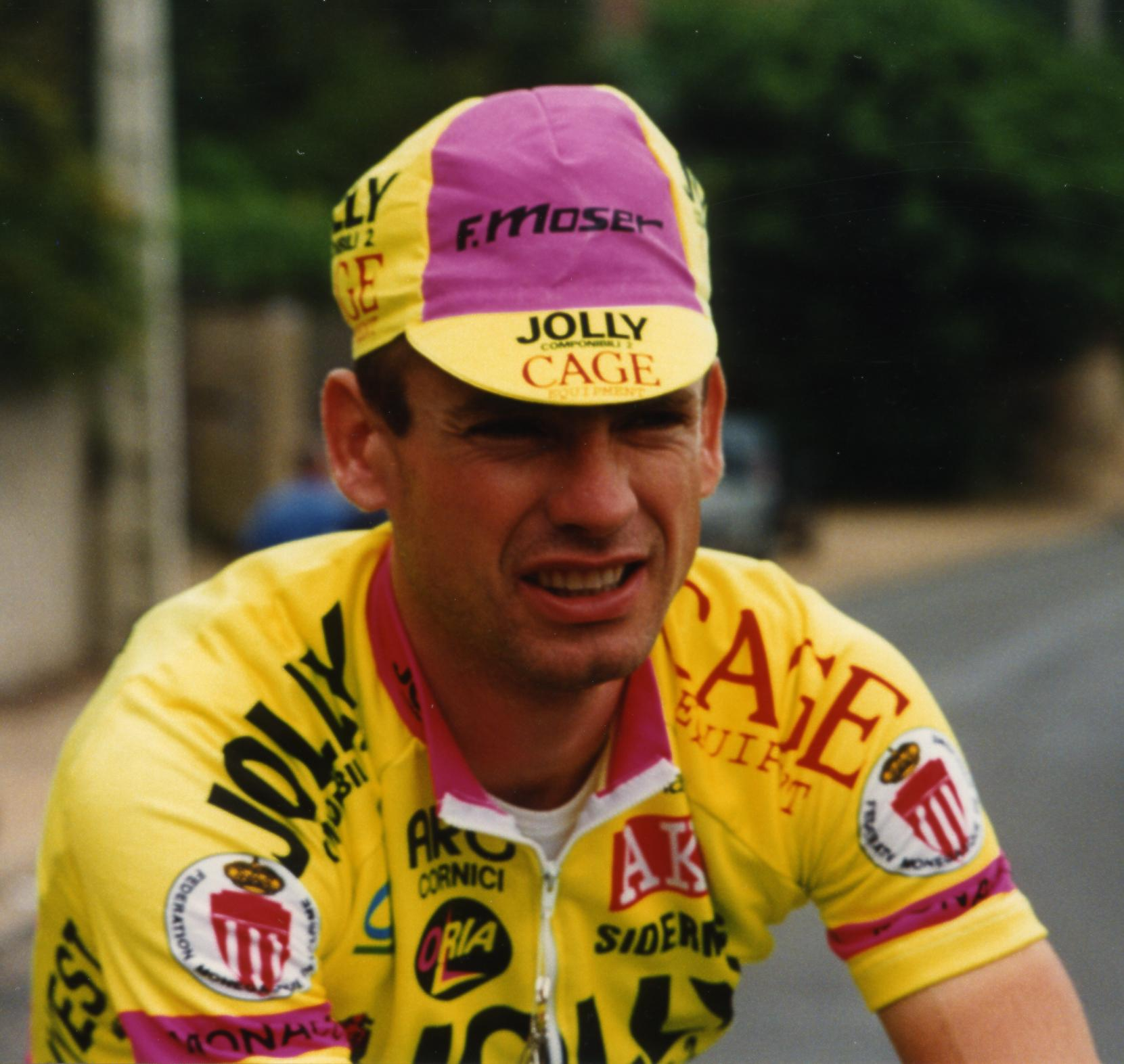

Personal information
- Born: 31 March 1964 (age 62) Creil, France
- Height: 1.80 m (5 ft 11 in)
- Weight: 69 kg (152 lb; 10 st 12 lb)

Cycling career
- Sport: Cycling
- Current team: Retired
- Discipline: Road
- Role: Rider

Professional teams
- 1990: Histor–Sigma
- 1991: Tonton Tapis–GB
- 1992–1993: GB–MG Maglificio
- 1994: Jolly Componibili–Cage
- 1995–1998: Mutuelle de Seine-et-Marne
- 1999–2000: Home Market–Ville de Charleroi

Laurent Pillon (born 31 March 1964) is a French former cyclist. He participated in the Tour de France five times and eight Grand Tours overall. His son Romain Pillon also competed professionally.

== Major results ==
1987
1st Circuit des Ardennes
1990
2nd Duo Normand (with Francis Moreau)
3rd Overall Tour du Limousin
6th Chrono des Herbiers
1992
7th Overall Grand Prix du Midi Libre
1993
1st Stage 4 (TTT) Tour de France
1995
8th Overall Tour du Limousin
1997
7th Route Adélie
10th Grand Prix d'Ouverture La Marseillaise
1999
8th Overall Tour du Poitou-Charentes

=== Grand Tour general classification results timeline ===
Grand Tour	1990	1991	1992	1993	1994	1995	1996	1997
Giro d'Italia	—	—	—	41	88	—	—	—
Tour de France	103	51	88	66	—	—	—	DNF
Vuelta a España	—	—	53	—	—	—	—	—

Legend
DSQ	Disqualified
DNF	Did not finish
