= Atle Kvålsvoll =

Norwegian cyclist

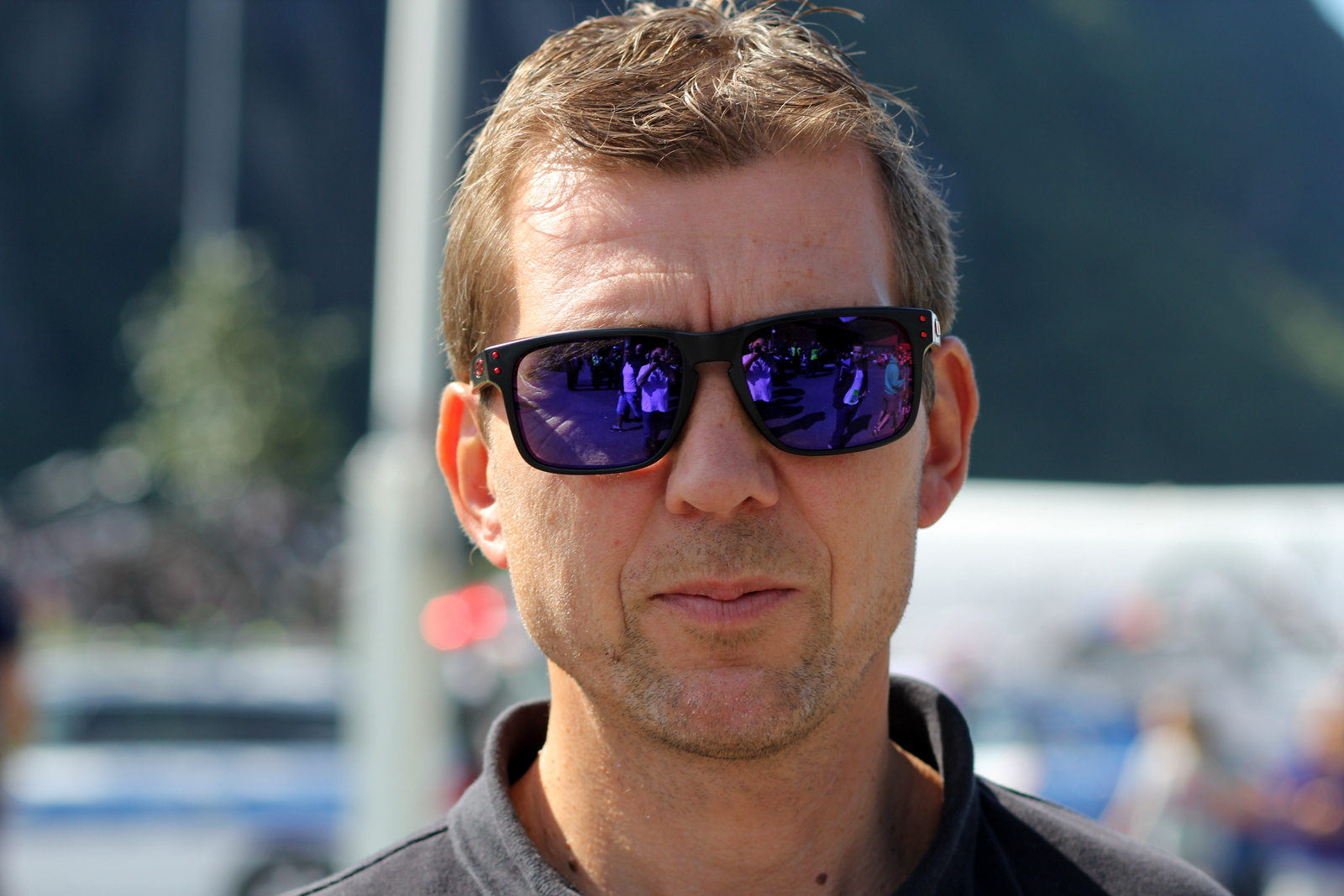
- Atle Kvålsvoll in 2013

Personal information
- Born: 10 April 1962 (age 64) Trondheim, Norway
- Height: 1.94 m (6 ft 4 in)

Cycling career
- Sport: Cycling
- Discipline: Road
- Role: Rider

Professional teams
- 1988–1992: Z–Peugeot
- 1993: Subaru–Montgomery
- 1994: WordPerfect–Colnago–Decca

Atle Sturla Kvålsvoll (born 10 April 1962) is a Norwegian former professional road cyclist. He rode the Tour de France six times between 1988 and 1994, finishing four times. His best performance was in 1990, when he finished 26th and contributed to Greg LeMond's winning the yellow jersey. He competed in the individual road race event at the 1984 Summer Olympics.

Kvålsvoll finished second in the American Tour DuPont in 1990, 1991 and 1992 and then finished 3rd in 1993. He also won a stage in 1991 and 1992.

Kvålsvoll is employed by the Norwegian sports organisation Olympiatoppen and was Thor Hushovd's coach.

In 2011 he has also accepted a role as directeur sportif for UCI Continental Team Plussbank Cervélo.

== Major results ==
1984
2nd Overall Tour of Norway
1985
3rd Overall Tour of Sweden
4th Overall Tour of Norway

1st Stage 6

1987
9th Overall Tour of Sweden
1988
3rd Duo Normand (with Olaf Lurvik)
5th Overall Tour du Limousin
1989
1st Overall Tour of Sweden

1st Stage 4

2nd Tour de Vendée
4th GP Ouest–France
9th Overall Four Days of Dunkirk
9th Overall Circuit Cycliste Sarthe
1990
1st Overall Tour du Vaucluse
2nd Overall Tour de Trump
3rd Time trial, National Road Championships
6th Overall Tour de Suisse
10th Liège–Bastogne–Liège
1991
1st Trophée des Grimpeurs
2nd Overall Tour DuPont

1st Stage 6

9th Overall Paris–Nice
10th Overall Circuit Cycliste Sarthe
1992
2nd Overall Tour DuPont

1st Stage 6

4th Paris–Camembert
6th La Flèche Wallonne
8th Trophée des Grimpeurs
1993
3rd Overall Tour DuPont
8th Trophée des Grimpeurs

=== Grand Tour general classification results timeline ===
| Grand Tour | 1988 | 1989 | 1990 | 1991 | 1992 | 1993 | 1994 |
|---|---|---|---|---|---|---|---|
| Giro d'Italia | — | — | — | 30 | — | — | — |
| Tour de France | DNF | 46 | 26 | DNF | 49 | — | 79 |
| Vuelta a España | — | — | — | — | — | — | — |
