= Daniel Steiger =

Swiss cyclist

Personal information
- Born: 21 August 1966 (age 60) Rickenbach, Schwyz, Switzerland

Cycling career
- Sport: Cycling
- Current team: Retired
- Discipline: Road
- Role: Rider

Amateur team
- 1988: RMV Rickenbach

Professional teams
- 1989–1990: Frank–Toyo
- 1991–1992: Jolly Componibili–Club 88
- 1993: Eldor–Viner

Daniel Steiger (born 21 August 1966) is a Swiss former road cyclist. He competed in the road race at the 1988 Summer Olympics. He also rode in three editions of the Giro d'Italia.

== Major results ==
1988
GP Tell

1st Stages 1, 2 & 5

1st Prologue Circuit Franco-Belge
1989
2nd Overall GP Tell

1st Stages 2 & 3

2nd Overall Tour de Suisse
6th Firenze–Pistoia
1990
2nd Time trial, National Road Championships
2nd Firenze–Pistoia
4th Overall Tour de Suisse
9th Overall Tirreno–Adriatico
1991
1st Trofeo Matteotti
6th Trofeo Laigueglia
1992
3rd GP Industria & Artigianato di Larciano
7th Firenze–Pistoia
