= Thomas Barth =

German cyclist (born 1960)

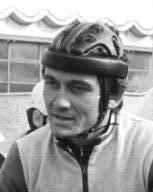
- Thomas Barth in 1984

Personal information
- Born: 12 February 1960 (age 66) Zeulenroda, Bezirk Gera, East Germany

Cycling career
- Sport: Cycling

Thomas Barth (born 12 February 1960) is a German former cyclist. He competed for East Germany in the individual road race event at the 1980 Summer Olympics.
