= Romain Pillon =

French cyclist

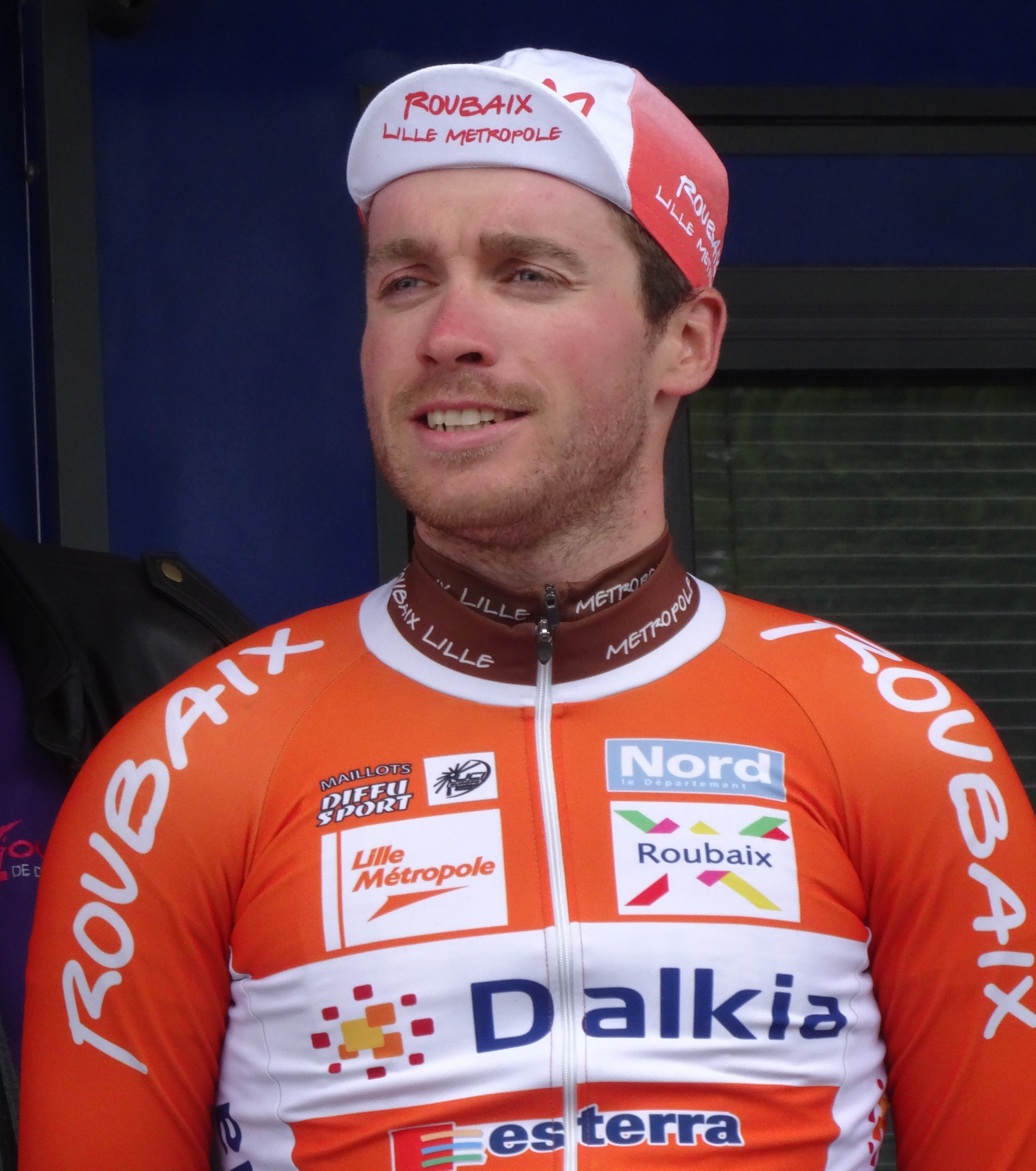
- Pillon in 2014

Personal information
- Full name: Romain Pillon
- Born: 22 September 1988 (age 38) Croix, Nord, France

Cycling career
- Sport: Cycling
- Discipline: Road
- Role: Rider

Amateur teams
- 2009–2013: ESEG Douai
- 2016: ESEG Douai–Origine Cycles

Professional team
- 2014–2015: Roubaix–Lille Métropole

Romain Pillon (born 22 September 1988 in Croix, Nord) is a French former professional cyclist. His father, Laurent Pillon, was also a professional cyclist.

== Major results ==
2012
2nd Tour du Piémont Vosgien
