= Robin Seymour (cyclist) =

Irish cyclist

Personal information
- Born: 6 April 1971 (age 55) Wicklow, Ireland

Cycling career
- Sport: Cycling
- Disciplines: Mountain biking; Cyclo-cross
- Role: Rider

Robin Seymour (born 6 April 1971) is an Irish professional and three-time Olympic cross-country mountain bike and cyclo cross racer who rides for the WORC (Wicklow Off Road Club) team. Seymour is a former motorbike racer who turned to cycling. Seymour has dominated mountain biking and cyclo-cross in Ireland and has been Irish mountain bike champion a total of 20 times, including 15 times consecutively between 1993 and 2008 and 18 times the Irish cyclo-cross champion.

== Career ==
Seymour’s father Geoff is involved in cycling in Ireland and has organized the National Mountain Bike championships in 2004 as well as being the Irish National team manager for the International mountain bike events.

Seymour has dominated mountain biking and cyclo-cross in Ireland and has been Irish mountain bike champion 20 times, including 15 times consecutively between 1993 and 2008. He has also been the Irish cyclo-cross champion 18 times. Between 1991 and 2008, he was beaten only twice in the Irish cyclo-cross championships, and that was by Roger Aiken in the 2004/05 season and then the 2007/08 season. On 20 July 2014 he won the Irish XC MTB championships for a 20th time before announcing that he would turn his attention to other events.

Seymour has been the principal rider for earning UCI points so that the Irish National Mountain cycling team could get a place at the 1996, 2000 and 2004 Summer Olympic Games in the mountain bike competition. Seymour has been an Olympian at the 2000 Sydney Olympics, 2004 Summer Olympic Games and 2008 Athens Olympics.

He has also represented Ireland at the UCI Mountain Bike World Championships and UCI Cyclo-cross World Championships. In the cyclo cross and mountain bike disciplines, Seymour dominates the Irish calendar and also competes World Cup mountain bike and cyclo cross races.

In 2005, Seymour together with fellow Irish Olympian Tarja Owens competed in and won the mixed category event of the seven-day 2005 TransRockies Challenge. The two person team that Seymour and Owens rode under was called Podge and Rodge. Whether this team name was due to possible sponsorship by the Irish television puppets Podge and Rodge or whether it was just due to the humorous name is unknown.

Due to age, Seymour now competes at Masters level; he won his third consecutive first place title at the UCI 2018 Masters Mountain Bike World Championships in Andorra.

== Major results ==
- 1st "Olympic" Circuit, Greece 2004
- 1st TransRockies Challenge 2005 (Mixed category with Tarja Owens)
- 1st Buyukada Cup, Turkey 2007
- 2nd Portugal Cup XCO Porto des Mos, Portugal 2007
- Ireland MTB Champion 20 times (1993–2008, 2010–11, 2013–14)
- Ireland National Cyclo-cross Champion 18 times (1991–2003, 2005–2006, 2011–12)
- 1st XCO UCI Mountain Bike Masters World Championships 3 times (2016-17-18) - Val di Sol (2016), Vallnord (2017), Vallnord (2018)
