= Olaf Lurvik =

Norwegian cyclist

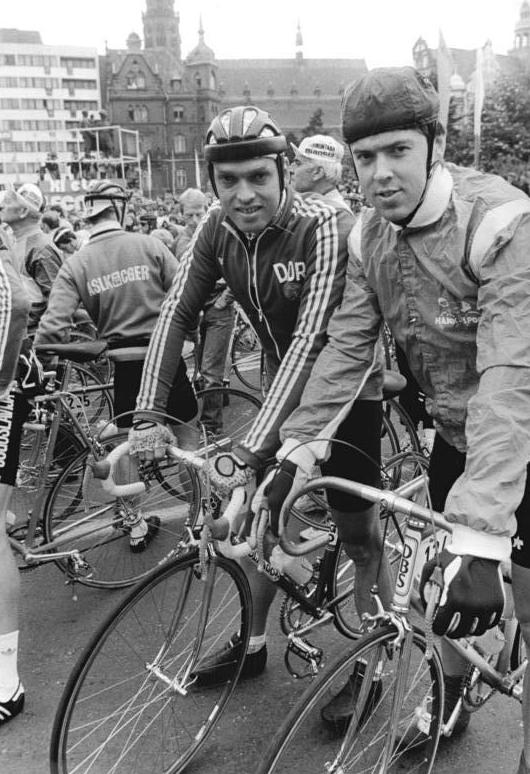

Olaf Lurvik (born 23 September 1963) is a Norwegian former professional road bicycle racer. He was professional between 1988 and 1991, and represented the teams Peugeot and Toshiba. In 1991, he was one of four Norwegians that entered the Tour de France, alongside Dag Otto Lauritzen, Atle Kvålsvoll and Atle Pedersen. As of 2013, this is the only year that four Norwegians was in the Tour, but Lurvik was the only of the four the completed the 1991 Tour de France.
