= Dag Erik Pedersen =

Norwegian cyclist (1959–2024)

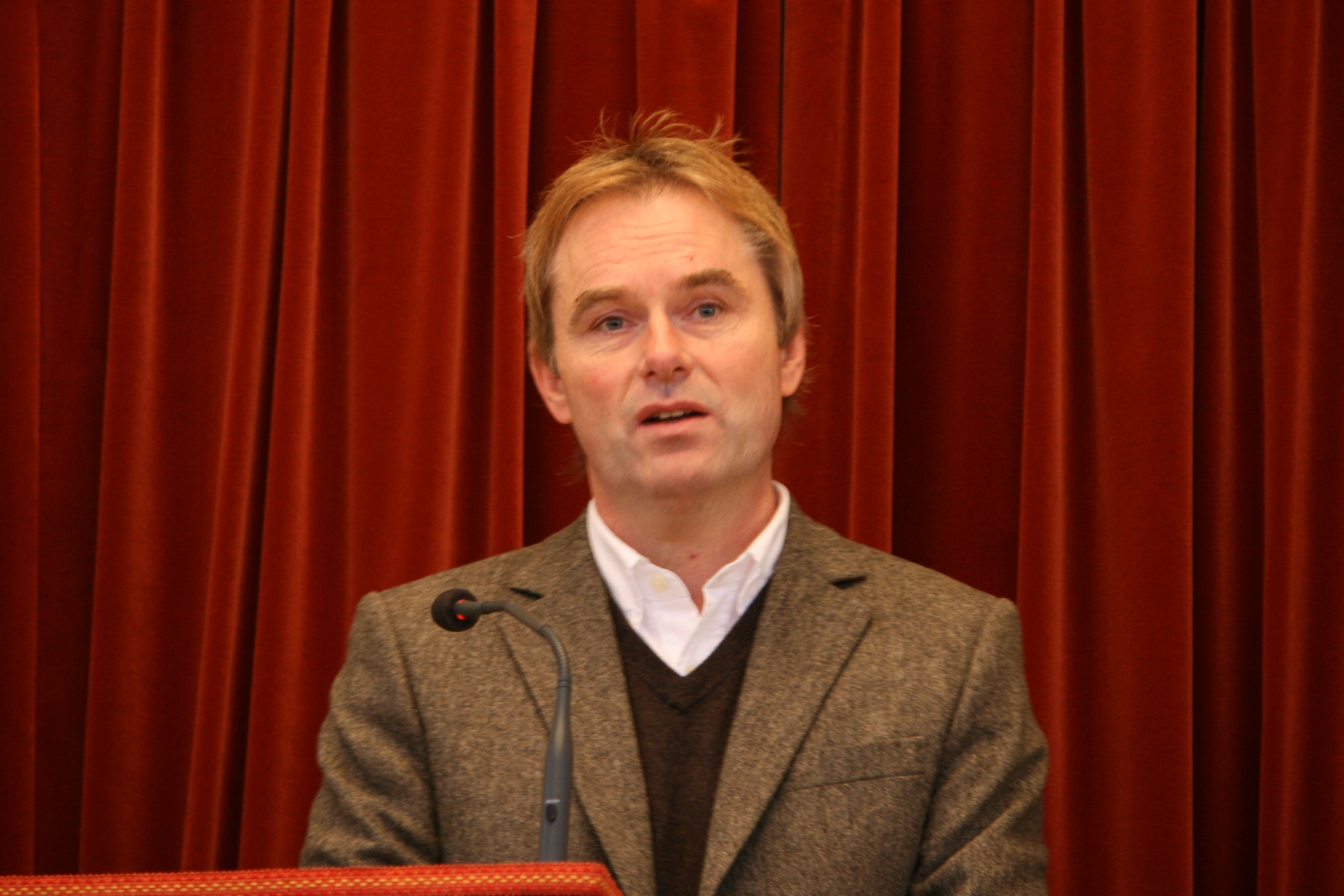
- Pedersen in 2008

Personal information
- Full name: Dag Erik Pedersen
- Born: 6 June 1959 Skien, Norway
- Died: 3 June 2024 (aged 64) Helgeroa, Norway

Cycling career
- Sport: Cycling
- Discipline: Road
- Role: Rider

Professional teams
- 1982–1983: Bianchi–Piaggio
- 1984–1985: Murella–Rossin
- 1986–1987: Ariostea–Gres
- 1988–1989: PDM–Ultima–Concorde
- 1990: TVM
- 1991: Del Tongo–MG Boys

Major wins
- Grand Tours Giro d'Italia 3 individual stages (1984, 1986) One-day races and Classics National Road Race Championships (1992)

Dag Erik Pedersen (6 June 1959 – 3 June 2024) was a Norwegian road racing cyclist with a long career as professional. He won 3 stages in the Giro d'Italia and he came 4th in the Road race in the 1981 World Championship. He was a member of Birkenes IL, previously for Larvik SK and Grenland SK before he turned professional after the Worlds in September 1981.

Pedersen won a total of 43 professional races in his 12 years in Italy and the Netherlands. He won the Norwegian National Road Race Championship in 1992.

After he retired as a cyclist he began working for the Norwegian Broadcasting Corporation where until his death he worked as an anchor. He won best news and sports anchor in Norway in 2002, 2004, 2005 and 2008. He spoke fluent English, German, Italian, French, Dutch and basic Spanish.

Pedersen also worked with film director Nils Gaup on several occasions. Best known are "When Dylan came to Langesund" and "Deadline Torp". In 2000, he made a TV documentary about King Harald of Norway. He also made TV portraits of famous people like Sir Paul McCartney, Andrea Bocelli, B. B. King, Michael Persbrandt, Rod Stewart, Kronprins Haakon of Norway, Nobel Peace Prize winner Rigoberta Menchú and Bernard Kouchner. In the early 1980s he had a career as a pop singer issuing two singles and the album Gatelangs.

He spent 24 days in prison in 1994 for speeding.

In an interview with Norwegian media VG/NRK, Pedersen did not rule out that he might have been drugged when, in the 1980s, he got injections whose content he did not know.

Already in 2008, Pedersen was saying that injections with unknown content were a part of the normal daily routines as a bicycle professional. Pedersen tested positive for ephedrine at the 1981 Milk Race (Tour of Britain) and got a one-month suspension.

Pedersen died in Helgeroa on 3 June 2024, at the age of 64.

== Major results ==
1977
National Junior Road Championships

1st Road race
1st Time trial

1979
1st Overall Ringerike GP
2nd Overall Tour de Berlin
1980
2nd Overall Rheinland-Pfalz Rundfahrt
1981
1st Overall GP Tell
1st Overall Ringerike GP
1st Stage 9 Milk Race
1982
1st Giro del Lazio
5th Giro dell'Emilia
5th GP Industria & Artigianato
7th Coppa Agostoni
8th Overall Ruota d'Oro
1983
2nd Giro del Veneto
3rd Giro dell'Emilia
3rd Overall Tour of the Americas
4th Overall Tour de Romandie
8th Overall Tour of Sweden
1984
1st Overall Tour of Norway

1st Stage 4

2nd Giro di Campania
6th Milan–San Remo
7th Overall Giro del Trentino
10th Overall Giro d'Italia

1st Stages 9 & 16

10th Paris–Tours
1986
1st Stage 15 Giro d'Italia
2nd Giro dell'Emilia
3rd Liège–Bastogne–Liège
3rd Overall Giro di Puglia
3rd GP Industria & Artigianato
4th Giro dell'Etna
6th Trofeo Pantalica
7th Tre Valli Varesine
7th Züri-Metzgete
8th Overall Circuit Cycliste Sarthe
8th Giro del Trentino
10th Paris–Tours
10th Giro di Campania
10th Nice–Alassio
1987
4th Grand Prix Cerami
9th Milan–San Remo
9th Overall Tour de Romandie
1989
1st Overall Tour of Norway

1st Stages 1 & 5

2nd Milano–Torino
5th Brabantse Pijl
1990
1st Overall Ringerike GP

1st Stage 5

2nd Overall Tour of Norway

1st Stages 4, 5 & 6

1991
1st Overall Tour of Norway

1st Stages 2 & 5

2nd Overall Tour of Sweden

1st Stages 3 & 6

1992
1st Road race, National Road Championships
3rd Overall Tour of Norway

=== Grand Tour general classification results timeline ===
Grand Tour	1984	1985	1986	1987	1988	1989	1990
Vuelta a España	—	—	—	—	—	—	—
Giro d'Italia	10	DNF	81	59	DNF	—	DNF
Tour de France	—	—	—	—	—	—	—

Legend
—	Did not compete
DNF	Did not finish
