= Atle Pedersen =

Norwegian cyclist

Personal information
- Born: 27 July 1964 (age 62) Larvik, Norway
- Height: 1.78 m (5 ft 10 in)
- Weight: 82 kg (181 lb)

Cycling career
- Sport: Cycling
- Role: Rider

Professional teams
- 1988–1990: PDM–Ultima–Concorde
- 1991: Tonton Tapis–GB
- 1993: DBS

Major wins
- Grand Tours Vuelta a España 1 individual stage (1990) One-day races and Classics National Road Race Championships (1985, 1986)

Atle Pedersen (born 27 July 1964) is a Norwegian former professional racing cyclist. He won the Norwegian National Road Race Championship in 1985 and 1986. He also competed in the road race at the 1988 Summer Olympics.
