= Frank–Toyo =

Cycling team (1987-1990)

Team information
- Registered: Switzerland
- Founded: 1987
- Disbanded: 1990
- Discipline: Road

Key personnel
- Team managers: Robert Thalmann; Daniel Gisiger

Team name history
- 1987 1988 1989–1990: Isotonic–Cyndarella; Cyndarella–Isotonic; Frank–Toyo

Frank–Toyo, also known as Isotonic–Cyndarella, was a Swiss professional cycling team that existed from 1987 to 1990.

The team competed in three editions of the Giro d'Italia, with rider Rolf Järmann winning a stage in 1989.

== Major wins ==
1988
Overall Grand Prix Guillaume Tell, Fabian Fuchs
1989
Stage 4 Giro d'Italia, Rolf Järmann
Overall Grand Prix Guillaume Tell, Karl Kälin
1990
Overall Grand Prix Guillaume Tell, Werner Stutz
Gran Premio di Lugano, Marco Vitali
