= Marco Vitali =

Italian cyclist

Personal information
- Full name: Marco Vitali
- Born: 18 June 1960 (age 66) Fano, Italy

Cycling career
- Sport: Cycling
- Discipline: Road

Professional teams
- 1983–1985: Del Tongo–Colnago
- 1986: Cilo–Aufina
- 1987–1989: Atala–Ofmega
- 1990: Frank–Toyo
- 1991: Jolly Componibili–Club 88

Major wins
- Grand Tours Giro d'Italia 1 individual stage (1987)

Marco Vitali (born 18 June 1960) is an Italian former professional cyclist. He is most known for winning one stage in the 1987 Giro d'Italia.

== Major results ==
1979
2nd GP Capodarco
1981
3rd GP Lugano
1982
1st GP Lugano
2nd Gran Premio della Liberazione
1984
4th G.P. Camaiore
9th Tre Valli Varesine
1985
3rd G.P. Camaiore
9th Overall Tour de Suisse
1986
4th Tour du Nord-Ouest
1987
1st Stage 17 Giro d'Italia
1988
1st GP Lugano
8th Coppa Placci
10th G.P. Camaiore
1989
2nd Trofeo Laigueglia
2nd Trofeo Matteotti
2nd Nice-Alassio
6th GP Industria & Artigianato di Larciano
7th Coppa Placci
8th Tre Valli Varesine
9th Giro di Romagna
1990
1st GP Lugano
3rd Overall Giro di Puglia
9th Overall Tour de Suisse
1991
10th Giro di Lombardia
