= Angelo Lecchi =

Italian cyclist

Personal information
- Born: 13 December 1966 (age 59) Verdello, Italy

Cycling career
- Sport: Cycling
- Role: Rider

Angelo Lecchi (born 13 December 1966) is an Italian former professional racing cyclist. He rode in two editions of the Tour de France, five editions of the Giro d'Italia and two editions of the Vuelta a España.

== Major results ==
1988
1st Stage 4b Giro d'Italia (TTT)
1989
1st Overall Giro di Puglia

1st Stage 1

1990
5th Giro del Friuli
1994
1st Coppa Placci
1st Milano-Vignola
3rd Giro del Lazio
4th Giro dell'Emilia
1995
2nd Tre Valli Varesine
1996
5th GP Ouest–France
1997
4th Overall Tour de Langkawi
10th Overall Tour de Luxembourg
