= Werner Stutz =

Swiss cyclist

Personal information
- Born: 10 April 1962 (age 64)

Cycling career
- Sport: Cycling
- Role: Rider

Werner Stutz (born 10 April 1962) is a Swiss racing cyclist. He rode in the 1991 Tour de France.
