= 1991 Giro d'Italia, Stage 1 to Stage 10 =

Cycling race stages

The 1991 Giro d'Italia was the 74th edition of the Giro d'Italia, one of cycling's Grand Tours. The Giro began in Olbia, with a mountainous stage on 26 May, and Stage 10 occurred on 5 June with a stage to Langhirano. The race finished in Milan on 16 June.

== Stage 1 ==
26 May 1991 — Olbia to Olbia, 193 km (120 mi)

Stage 1 result

Rank	Rider	Team	Time
1	Philippe Casado (FRA)	Z	4h 37' 54"
2	Didier Thueux (FRA)	Castorama–Raleigh	s.t.
3	Franco Chioccioli (ITA)	Del Tongo–MG Boys	s.t.
4	Franco Ballerini (ITA)	Del Tongo–MG Boys	s.t.
5	Gianluca Bortolami (ITA)	Colnago–Lampre	s.t.
6	Davide Cassani (ITA)	Ariostea	s.t.
7	Daniel Wyder (SUI)	Selle Italia–Vetta	s.t.
8	Raimondo Vairetti (ITA)	Selle Italia–Vetta	s.t.
9	Claudio Chiappucci (ITA)	Carrera Jeans–Tassoni	s.t.
10	Silvio Martinello (ITA)	Gis Gelati–Ballan	s.t.

General classification after Stage 1

Rank	Rider	Team	Time
1	Philippe Casado (FRA)	Z	4h 37' 42"
2	Didier Thueux (FRA)	Castorama–Raleigh	+ 4"
3	Alberto Leanizbarrutia (ITA)	CLAS–Cajastur	+ 6"
4	Franco Chioccioli (ITA)	Del Tongo–MG Boys	+ 8"
5	Claudio Chiappucci (ITA)	Carrera Jeans–Tassoni	s.t.
6	Davide Cassani (ITA)	Ariostea	+ 10"
7	Franco Ballerini (ITA)	Del Tongo–MG Boys	+ 12"
8	Gianluca Bortolami (ITA)	Colnago–Lampre	s.t.
9	Daniel Wyder (SUI)	Selle Italia–Vetta	s.t.
10	Raimondo Vairetti (ITA)	Selle Italia–Vetta	s.t.

== Stage 2a ==
27 May 1991 — Olbia to Sassari, 127 km (79 mi)

Stage 2a result

Rank	Rider	Team	Time
1	Gianni Bugno (ITA)	Chateau d'Ax–Gatorade	3h 21' 32"
2	Franco Chioccioli (ITA)	Del Tongo–MG Boys	s.t.
3	Vladimir Poulnikov (URS)	Carrera Jeans–Tassoni	s.t.
4	Éric Boyer (FRA)	Z	s.t.
5	Giuseppe Petito (ITA)	Gis Gelati–Ballan	s.t.
6	Davide Cassani (ITA)	Ariostea	s.t.
7	Acácio da Silva (POR)	Lotus–Festina	s.t.
8	Atle Kvålsvoll (NOR)	Z	s.t.
9	Claudio Chiappucci (ITA)	Carrera Jeans–Tassoni	s.t.
10	Gianluca Bortolami (ITA)	Colnago–Lampre	s.t.

== Stage 2b ==
27 May 1991 — Sassari, 7.7 km (4.8 mi) (ITT)

Stage 2b result

Rank	Rider	Team	Time
1	Gianluca Pierobon (ITA)	ZG Mobili–Bottecchia	10' 09"
2	Marino Lejarreta (ESP)	ONCE	+ 5"
3	Franco Chioccioli (ITA)	Del Tongo–MG Boys	s.t.
4	Jean-François Bernard (FRA)	Banesto	s.t.
5	Claudio Chiappucci (ITA)	Carrera Jeans–Tassoni	+ 8"
6	Gianni Bugno (ITA)	Chateau d'Ax–Gatorade	+ 10"
7	Zenon Jaskuła (POL)	Del Tongo–MG Boys	+ 12"
8	Greg LeMond (USA)	Z	+ 13"
9	Massimo Ghirotto (ITA)	Carrera Jeans–Tassoni	+ 14"
10	Vladimir Poulnikov (URS)	Carrera Jeans–Tassoni	+ 15"

General classification after Stage 2b

Rank	Rider	Team	Time
1	Franco Chioccioli (ITA)	Del Tongo–MG Boys	8h 09' 28"
2	Gianni Bugno (ITA)	Chateau d'Ax–Gatorade	+ 5"
3	Claudio Chiappucci (ITA)	Carrera Jeans–Tassoni	+ 11"
4	Marino Lejarreta (ESP)	ONCE	+ 12"
5	Jean-François Bernard (FRA)	Banesto	s.t.
6	Vladimir Poulnikov (URS)	Carrera Jeans–Tassoni	+ 18"
7	Zenon Jaskuła (POL)	Del Tongo–MG Boys	+ 19"
8	Greg LeMond (USA)	Z	+ 20"
9	Massimo Ghirotto (ITA)	Carrera Jeans–Tassoni	+ 21"
10	Gianluca Bortolami (ITA)	Colnago–Lampre	+ 23"

== Stage 3 ==
28 May 1991 — Sassari to Cagliari, 231 km (144 mi)

Stage 3 result

Rank	Rider	Team	Time
1	Mario Cipollini (ITA)	Del Tongo–MG Boys	6h 11' 52"
2	Djamolidine Abdoujaparov (URS)	Carrera Jeans–Tassoni	s.t.
3	Giuseppe Petito (ITA)	Gis Gelati–Ballan	s.t.
4	Adriano Baffi (ITA)	Ariostea	s.t.
5	Endrio Leoni (ITA)	Jolly Componibili–Club 88	s.t.
6	Johan Capiot (BEL)	TVM–Sanyo	s.t.
7	Casimiro Moreda (ESP)	CLAS–Cajastur	s.t.
8	Christophe Capelle (FRA)	Z	s.t.
9	Roberto Pagnin (ITA)	Lotus–Festina	s.t.
10	Marc Siemons (NED)	TVM–Sanyo	s.t.

General classification after Stage 3

Rank	Rider	Team	Time
1	Franco Chioccioli (ITA)	Del Tongo–MG Boys	14h 21' 20"
2	Gianni Bugno (ITA)	Chateau d'Ax–Gatorade	+ 5"
3	Claudio Chiappucci (ITA)	Carrera Jeans–Tassoni	+ 11"
4	Marino Lejarreta (ESP)	ONCE	+ 12"
5	Jean-François Bernard (FRA)	Banesto	s.t.
6	Vladimir Poulnikov (URS)	Carrera Jeans–Tassoni	+ 18"
7	Zenon Jaskuła (POL)	Del Tongo–MG Boys	+ 19"
8	Greg LeMond (USA)	Z	+ 20"
9	Massimo Ghirotto (ITA)	Carrera Jeans–Tassoni	+ 21"
10	Gianluca Bortolami (ITA)	Colnago–Lampre	+ 23"

== Rest day ==
29 May 1991

== Stage 4 ==
30 May 1991 — Sorrento to Sorrento, 170 km (110 mi)

Stage 4 result

Rank	Rider	Team	Time
1	Éric Boyer (FRA)	Z	4h 23' 50"
2	Acácio da Silva (POR)	Lotus–Festina	+ 23"
3	Claudio Chiappucci (ITA)	Carrera Jeans–Tassoni	s.t.
4	Gianluca Bortolami (ITA)	Colnago–Lampre	s.t.
5	Roberto Gusmeroli (ITA)	Chateau d'Ax–Gatorade	s.t.
6	Marco Giovannetti (ITA)	Chateau d'Ax–Gatorade	s.t.
7	Giuseppe Petito (ITA)	Gis Gelati–Ballan	s.t.
8	Zenon Jaskuła (POL)	Del Tongo–MG Boys	s.t.
9	Iñaki Gastón (ESP)	CLAS–Cajastur	s.t.
10	Atle Kvålsvoll (NOR)	Z	s.t.

General classification after Stage 4

Rank	Rider	Team	Time
1	Éric Boyer (FRA)	Z	18h 45' 25"
2	Franco Chioccioli (ITA)	Del Tongo–MG Boys	+ 8"
3	Gianni Bugno (ITA)	Chateau d'Ax–Gatorade	+ 13"
4	Claudio Chiappucci (ITA)	Carrera Jeans–Tassoni	+ 15"
5	Marino Lejarreta (ESP)	ONCE	+ 20"
6	Jean-François Bernard (FRA)	Banesto	s.t.
7	Vladimir Poulnikov (URS)	Carrera Jeans–Tassoni	+ 26"
8	Zenon Jaskuła (POL)	Del Tongo–MG Boys	+ 27"
9	Greg LeMond (USA)	Z	+ 28"
10	Massimo Ghirotto (ITA)	Carrera Jeans–Tassoni	+ 29"

== Stage 5 ==
31 May 1991 — Sorrento to Scanno, 248 km (154 mi)

Stage 5 result

Rank	Rider	Team	Time
1	Marino Lejarreta (ESP)	ONCE	6h 47' 08"
2	Franco Chioccioli (ITA)	Del Tongo–MG Boys	s.t.
3	Claudio Chiappucci (ITA)	Carrera Jeans–Tassoni	+ 50"
4	Éric Boyer (FRA)	Z	s.t.
5	Massimiliano Lelli (ITA)	Ariostea	s.t.
6	Federico Echave (ESP)	CLAS–Cajastur	s.t.
7	Gianni Bugno (ITA)	Chateau d'Ax–Gatorade	s.t.
8	Eduardo Chozas (ESP)	ONCE	s.t.
9	Roberto Gusmeroli (ITA)	Chateau d'Ax–Gatorade	s.t.
10	Atle Kvålsvoll (NOR)	Z	s.t.

General classification after Stage 5

Rank	Rider	Team	Time
1	Franco Chioccioli (ITA)	Del Tongo–MG Boys	25h 32' 33"
2	Marino Lejarreta (ESP)	ONCE	+ 8"
3	Éric Boyer (FRA)	Z	+ 30"
4	Claudio Chiappucci (ITA)	Carrera Jeans–Tassoni	+ 1' 01"
5	Gianni Bugno (ITA)	Chateau d'Ax–Gatorade	+ 1' 03"
6	Vladimir Poulnikov (URS)	Carrera Jeans–Tassoni	+ 1' 16"
7	Zenon Jaskuła (POL)	Del Tongo–MG Boys	+ 1' 17"
8	Greg LeMond (USA)	Z	+ 1' 18"
9	Massimiliano Lelli (ITA)	Ariostea	+ 1' 24"
10	Federico Echave (ESP)	CLAS–Cajastur	+ 1' 25"

== Stage 6 ==
1 June 1991 — Scanno to Rieti, 205 km (127 mi)

Stage 6 result

Rank	Rider	Team	Time
1	Vladimir Poulnikov (URS)	Carrera Jeans–Tassoni	5h 19' 47"
2	Iñaki Gastón (ESP)	CLAS–Cajastur	s.t.
3	Marco Giovannetti (ITA)	Chateau d'Ax–Gatorade	s.t.
4	Gianni Bugno (ITA)	Chateau d'Ax–Gatorade	+ 5"
5	Atle Kvålsvoll (NOR)	Z	s.t.
6	Gianluca Bortolami (ITA)	Colnago–Lampre	s.t.
7	Franco Chioccioli (ITA)	Del Tongo–MG Boys	s.t.
8	Massimiliano Lelli (ITA)	Ariostea	s.t.
9	Marino Lejarreta (ESP)	ONCE	s.t.
10	Claudio Chiappucci (ITA)	Carrera Jeans–Tassoni	s.t.

General classification after Stage 6

Rank	Rider	Team	Time
1	Franco Chioccioli (ITA)	Del Tongo–MG Boys	30h 52' 25"
2	Marino Lejarreta (ESP)	ONCE	+ 8"
3	Vladimir Poulnikov (URS)	Carrera Jeans–Tassoni	+ 59"
4	Claudio Chiappucci (ITA)	Carrera Jeans–Tassoni	+ 1' 01"
5	Gianni Bugno (ITA)	Chateau d'Ax–Gatorade	+ 1' 03"
6	Marco Giovannetti (ITA)	Chateau d'Ax–Gatorade	+ 1' 23"
7	Massimiliano Lelli (ITA)	Ariostea	+ 1' 24"
8	Iñaki Gastón (ESP)	CLAS–Cajastur	s.t.
9	Leonardo Sierra (VEN)	Selle Italia–Eurocar	s.t.
10	Flavio Giupponi (ITA)	Carrera Jeans–Tassoni	+ 1' 27"

== Stage 7 ==
2 June 1991 — Rieti to Città di Castello, 174 km (108 mi)

Stage 7 result

Rank	Rider	Team	Time
1	Mario Cipollini (ITA)	Del Tongo–MG Boys	4h 04' 43"
2	Djamolidine Abdoujaparov (URS)	Carrera Jeans–Tassoni	s.t.
3	Casimiro Moreda (ESP)	CLAS–Cajastur	s.t.
4	Fabiano Fontanelli (ITA)	Italbonifica–Navigare	s.t.
5	Stefano Allocchio (ITA)	Italbonifica–Navigare	s.t.
6	Stefano Colagè (ITA)	ZG Mobili–Bottecchia	s.t.
7	Silvio Martinello (ITA)	Gis Gelati–Ballan	s.t.
8	Roberto Pagnin (ITA)	Lotus–Festina	s.t.
9	Kenneth Weltz (DEN)	ONCE	s.t.
10	Endrio Leoni (ITA)	Jolly Componibili–Club 88	s.t.

General classification after Stage 7

Rank	Rider	Team	Time
1	Franco Chioccioli (ITA)	Del Tongo–MG Boys	34h 57' 08"
2	Marino Lejarreta (ESP)	ONCE	+ 8"
3	Claudio Chiappucci (ITA)	Carrera Jeans–Tassoni	+ 57"
4	Vladimir Poulnikov (URS)	Carrera Jeans–Tassoni	+ 59"
5	Gianni Bugno (ITA)	Chateau d'Ax–Gatorade	+ 1' 03"
6	Marco Giovannetti (ITA)	Chateau d'Ax–Gatorade	+ 1' 23"
7	Massimiliano Lelli (ITA)	Ariostea	+ 1' 24"
8	Iñaki Gastón (ESP)	CLAS–Cajastur	s.t.
9	Leonardo Sierra (VEN)	Selle Italia–Eurocar	s.t.
10	Flavio Giupponi (ITA)	Carrera Jeans–Tassoni	+ 1' 27"

== Stage 8 ==
3 June 1991 — Città di Castello to Prato, 169 km (105 mi)

Stage 8 result

Rank	Rider	Team	Time
1	Davide Cassani (ITA)	Ariostea	4h 15' 44"
2	Mario Mantovan (ITA)	ZG Mobili–Bottecchia	s.t.
3	Fabiano Fontanelli (ITA)	Italbonifica–Navigare	+ 2"
4	Marco Lietti (ITA)	Ariostea	+ 2"
5	Massimo Ghirotto (ITA)	Carrera Jeans–Tassoni	s.t.
6	Luigi Botteon (ITA)	Colnago–Lampre	s.t.
7	Enrico Galleschi (ITA)	Gis Gelati–Ballan	s.t.
8	Giuseppe Calcaterra (ITA)	Chateau d'Ax–Gatorade	s.t.
9	Luc Suykerbuyk (NED)	Lotus–Festina	s.t.
10	Mario Cipollini (ITA)	Del Tongo–MG Boys	+ 8"

General classification after Stage 8

Rank	Rider	Team	Time
1	Franco Chioccioli (ITA)	Del Tongo–MG Boys	39h 13' 00"
2	Marino Lejarreta (ESP)	ONCE	+ 8"
3	Claudio Chiappucci (ITA)	Carrera Jeans–Tassoni	+ 57"
4	Vladimir Poulnikov (URS)	Carrera Jeans–Tassoni	+ 59"
5	Gianni Bugno (ITA)	Chateau d'Ax–Gatorade	+ 1' 03"
6	Marco Giovannetti (ITA)	Chateau d'Ax–Gatorade	+ 1' 23"
7	Massimiliano Lelli (ITA)	Ariostea	+ 1' 24"
8	Iñaki Gastón (ESP)	CLAS–Cajastur	s.t.
9	Flavio Giupponi (ITA)	Carrera Jeans–Tassoni	+ 1' 27"
10	Atle Kvålsvoll (NOR)	Z	+ 1' 28"

== Stage 9 ==
4 June 1991 — Prato to Felino, 229 km (142 mi)

Stage 9 result

Rank	Rider	Team	Time
1	Massimo Ghirotto (ITA)	Carrera Jeans–Tassoni	6h 09' 14"
2	Michele Moro (ITA)	Italbonifica–Navigare	+ 31"
3	Jean-François Bernard (FRA)	Banesto	+ 34"
4	Franco Vona (ITA)	Jolly Componibili–Club 88	s.t.
5	Federico Echave (ESP)	CLAS–Cajastur	s.t.
6	Massimo Podenzana (ITA)	Italbonifica–Navigare	+ 1' 28"
7	Claudio Chiappucci (ITA)	Carrera Jeans–Tassoni	s.t.
8	Vladimir Poulnikov (URS)	Carrera Jeans–Tassoni	s.t.
9	Laurent Fignon (FRA)	Castorama–Raleigh	s.t.
10	Santos Hernández (ESP)	ONCE	s.t.

General classification after Stage 9

Rank	Rider	Team	Time
1	Franco Chioccioli (ITA)	Del Tongo–MG Boys	45h 23' 41"
2	Marino Lejarreta (ESP)	ONCE	+ 8"
3	Claudio Chiappucci (ITA)	Carrera Jeans–Tassoni	+ 57"
4	Vladimir Poulnikov (URS)	Carrera Jeans–Tassoni	+ 59"
5	Gianni Bugno (ITA)	Chateau d'Ax–Gatorade	+ 1' 03"
6	Marco Giovannetti (ITA)	Chateau d'Ax–Gatorade	+ 1' 23"
7	Massimiliano Lelli (ITA)	Ariostea	+ 1' 24"
8	Iñaki Gastón (ESP)	CLAS–Cajastur	s.t.
9	Flavio Giupponi (ITA)	Carrera Jeans–Tassoni	+ 1' 27"
10	Atle Kvålsvoll (NOR)	Z	+ 1' 28"

== Stage 10 ==
5 June 1991 — Collecchio to Langhirano, 43 km (27 mi) (ITT)

Stage 10 result

Rank	Rider	Team	Time
1	Gianni Bugno (ITA)	Chateau d'Ax–Gatorade	55' 13"
2	Jean-François Bernard (FRA)	Banesto	+ 8"
3	Luca Gelfi (ITA)	Del Tongo–MG Boys	+ 45"
4	Stephen Hodge (AUS)	ONCE	+ 53"
5	Zenon Jaskuła (POL)	Del Tongo–MG Boys	+ 55"
6	Massimiliano Lelli (ITA)	Ariostea	+ 56"
7	Claudio Chiappucci (ITA)	Carrera Jeans–Tassoni	+ 1' 01"
8	Franco Chioccioli (ITA)	Del Tongo–MG Boys	+ 1' 02"
9	Leonardo Sierra (VEN)	Selle Italia–Eurocar	+ 1' 13"
10	Marino Lejarreta (ESP)	ONCE	+ 1' 20"

General classification after Stage 10

Rank	Rider	Team	Time
1	Franco Chioccioli (ITA)	Del Tongo–MG Boys	46h 19' 56"
2	Gianni Bugno (ITA)	Chateau d'Ax–Gatorade	+ 1"
3	Marino Lejarreta (ESP)	ONCE	+ 26"
4	Claudio Chiappucci (ITA)	Carrera Jeans–Tassoni	+ 56"
5	Massimiliano Lelli (ITA)	Ariostea	+ 1' 18"
6	Vladimir Poulnikov (URS)	Carrera Jeans–Tassoni	+ 1' 30"
7	Leonardo Sierra (VEN)	Selle Italia–Eurocar	+ 1' 58"
8	Zenon Jaskuła (POL)	Del Tongo–MG Boys	+ 2' 11"
9	Federico Echave (ESP)	CLAS–Cajastur	+ 2' 28"
10	Gianluca Bortolami (ITA)	Colnago–Lampre	+ 2' 52"
