= 1991 Giro d'Italia, Stage 11 to Stage 21 =

Cycling race stages

The 1991 Giro d'Italia was the 74th edition of the Giro d'Italia, one of cycling's Grand Tours. The Giro began in Olbia, with a mountainous stage on 26 May, and Stage 11 occurred on 6 June with a stage from Sala Baganza. The race finished in Milan on 16 June.

== Stage 11 ==
6 June 1991 — Sala Baganza to Savona, 223 km (139 mi)

Stage 11 result

Rank	Rider	Team	Time
1	Max Sciandri (ITA)	Carrera Jeans–Tassoni	5h 35' 10"
2	Greg LeMond (USA)	Z	s.t.
3	Jacky Durand (FRA)	Castorama–Raleigh	+ 5"
4	Mario Cipollini (ITA)	Del Tongo–MG Boys	s.t.
5	Gianluca Bortolami (ITA)	Colnago–Lampre	s.t.
6	Fabiano Fontanelli (ITA)	Italbonifica–Navigare	s.t.
7	Michele Coppolillo (ITA)	Italbonifica–Navigare	s.t.
8	Silvio Martinello (ITA)	Gis Gelati–Ballan	s.t.
9	Giovanni Fidanza (ITA)	Chateau d'Ax–Gatorade	s.t.
10	Vadim Chabalkine (URS)	Lotus–Festina	s.t.

General classification after Stage 11

Rank	Rider	Team	Time
1	Franco Chioccioli (ITA)	Del Tongo–MG Boys	51h 55' 11"
2	Gianni Bugno (ITA)	Chateau d'Ax–Gatorade	+ 1"
3	Marino Lejarreta (ESP)	ONCE	+ 26"
4	Claudio Chiappucci (ITA)	Carrera Jeans–Tassoni	+ 54"
5	Massimiliano Lelli (ITA)	Ariostea	+ 1' 18"
6	Vladimir Poulnikov (URS)	Carrera Jeans–Tassoni	+ 1' 30"
7	Leonardo Sierra (VEN)	Selle Italia–Eurocar	+ 1' 58"
8	Zenon Jaskuła (POL)	Del Tongo–MG Boys	+ 2' 11"
9	Federico Echave (ESP)	CLAS–Cajastur	+ 2' 28"
10	Gianluca Bortolami (ITA)	Colnago–Lampre	+ 2' 48"

== Stage 12 ==
7 June 1991 — Savona to Pian del Re, 182 km (113 mi)

Stage 12 result

Rank	Rider	Team	Time
1	Massimiliano Lelli (ITA)	Ariostea	5h 04' 10"
2	Jean-François Bernard (FRA)	Banesto	+ 3"
3	Franco Chioccioli (ITA)	Del Tongo–MG Boys	s.t.
4	Marino Lejarreta (ESP)	ONCE	s.t.
5	Claudio Chiappucci (ITA)	Carrera Jeans–Tassoni	+ 38"
6	Éric Boyer (FRA)	Z	s.t.
7	Eduardo Chozas (ESP)	ONCE	+ 1' 28"
8	Roberto Conti (ITA)	Ariostea	s.t.
9	Federico Echave (ESP)	CLAS–Cajastur	s.t.
10	Leonardo Sierra (VEN)	Selle Italia–Eurocar	+ 1' 33"

General classification after Stage 12

Rank	Rider	Team	Time
1	Franco Chioccioli (ITA)	Del Tongo–MG Boys	56h 59' 20"
2	Marino Lejarreta (ESP)	ONCE	+ 30"
3	Massimiliano Lelli (ITA)	Ariostea	+ 1' 07"
4	Claudio Chiappucci (ITA)	Carrera Jeans–Tassoni	+ 1' 33"
5	Gianni Bugno (ITA)	Chateau d'Ax–Gatorade	+ 1' 57"
6	Vladimir Poulnikov (URS)	Carrera Jeans–Tassoni	+ 3' 26"
7	Leonardo Sierra (VEN)	Selle Italia–Eurocar	+ 3' 32"
8	Federico Echave (ESP)	CLAS–Cajastur	+ 3' 57"
9	Zenon Jaskuła (POL)	Del Tongo–MG Boys	+ 4' 02"
10	Éric Boyer (FRA)	Z	+ 4' 05"

== Stage 13 ==
8 June 1991 — Savigliano to Sestriere, 192 km (119 mi)

Stage 13 result

Rank	Rider	Team	Time
1	Eduardo Chozas (ESP)	ONCE	5h 58' 36"
2	Claudio Chiappucci (ITA)	Carrera Jeans–Tassoni	+ 1"
3	Marino Lejarreta (ESP)	ONCE	+ 3"
4	Franco Chioccioli (ITA)	Del Tongo–MG Boys	s.t.
5	Éric Boyer (FRA)	Z	+ 6"
6	Massimiliano Lelli (ITA)	Ariostea	+ 25"
7	Roberto Conti (ITA)	Ariostea	+ 29"
8	Leonardo Sierra (VEN)	Selle Italia–Eurocar	+ 31"
9	Santos Hernández (ESP)	ONCE	+ 35"
10	Zenon Jaskuła (POL)	Del Tongo–MG Boys	+ 37"

General classification after Stage 13

Rank	Rider	Team	Time
1	Franco Chioccioli (ITA)	Del Tongo–MG Boys	62h 57' 59"
2	Marino Lejarreta (ESP)	ONCE	+ 26"
3	Claudio Chiappucci (ITA)	Carrera Jeans–Tassoni	+ 1' 23"
4	Massimiliano Lelli (ITA)	Ariostea	+ 1' 29"
5	Gianni Bugno (ITA)	Chateau d'Ax–Gatorade	+ 2' 37"
6	Leonardo Sierra (VEN)	Selle Italia–Eurocar	+ 4' 00"
7	Vladimir Poulnikov (URS)	Carrera Jeans–Tassoni	+ 4' 04"
8	Éric Boyer (FRA)	Z	+ 4' 08"
9	Federico Echave (ESP)	CLAS–Cajastur	+ 4' 33"
10	Zenon Jaskuła (POL)	Del Tongo–MG Boys	+ 4' 36"

== Stage 14 ==
9 June 1991 — Turin to Morbegno, 239 km (149 mi)

Stage 14 result

Rank	Rider	Team	Time
1	Franco Ballerini (ITA)	Del Tongo–MG Boys	5h 35' 42"
2	Philippe Casado (FRA)	Z	s.t.
3	Juan Martínez (ESP)	Banesto	+ 2"
4	Brian Petersen (DEN)	Amore & Vita–Fanini	+ 14"
5	Fabiano Fontanelli (ITA)	Italbonifica–Navigare	+ 1' 55"
6	Marco Lietti (ITA)	Ariostea	s.t.
7	Gianluca Pierobon (ITA)	ZG Mobili–Bottecchia	s.t.
8	Johan Capiot (BEL)	TVM–Sanyo	s.t.
9	Mario Cipollini (ITA)	Del Tongo–MG Boys	s.t.
10	Silvio Martinello (ITA)	Gis Gelati–Ballan	s.t.

General classification after Stage 14

Rank	Rider	Team	Time
1	Franco Chioccioli (ITA)	Del Tongo–MG Boys	68h 35' 36"
2	Marino Lejarreta (ESP)	ONCE	+ 26"
3	Claudio Chiappucci (ITA)	Carrera Jeans–Tassoni	+ 1' 23"
4	Massimiliano Lelli (ITA)	Ariostea	+ 1' 29"
5	Gianni Bugno (ITA)	Chateau d'Ax–Gatorade	+ 2' 37"
6	Leonardo Sierra (VEN)	Selle Italia–Eurocar	+ 4' 00"
7	Vladimir Poulnikov (URS)	Carrera Jeans–Tassoni	+ 4' 04"
8	Éric Boyer (FRA)	Z	+ 4' 08"
9	Federico Echave (ESP)	CLAS–Cajastur	+ 4' 33"
10	Zenon Jaskuła (POL)	Del Tongo–MG Boys	+ 4' 36"

== Stage 15 ==
10 June 1991 — Morbegno to Aprica, 132 km (82 mi)

Stage 15 result

Rank	Rider	Team	Time
1	Franco Chioccioli (ITA)	Del Tongo–MG Boys	4h 01' 53"
2	Jean-François Bernard (FRA)	Banesto	+ 32"
3	Éric Boyer (FRA)	Z	s.t.
4	Zenon Jaskuła (POL)	Del Tongo–MG Boys	+ 46"
5	Claudio Chiappucci (ITA)	Carrera Jeans–Tassoni	s.t.
6	Marino Lejarreta (ESP)	ONCE	+ 48"
7	Gianni Bugno (ITA)	Chateau d'Ax–Gatorade	s.t.
8	Massimiliano Lelli (ITA)	Ariostea	+ 50"
9	Leonardo Sierra (VEN)	Selle Italia–Eurocar	+ 58"
10	Nelson Rodríguez (COL)	Pony Malta–Avianca	s.t.

General classification after Stage 15

Rank	Rider	Team	Time
1	Franco Chioccioli (ITA)	Del Tongo–MG Boys	72h 37' 17"
2	Marino Lejarreta (ESP)	ONCE	+ 1' 26"
3	Claudio Chiappucci (ITA)	Carrera Jeans–Tassoni	+ 2' 21"
4	Massimiliano Lelli (ITA)	Ariostea	+ 2' 31"
5	Gianni Bugno (ITA)	Chateau d'Ax–Gatorade	+ 3' 37"
6	Éric Boyer (FRA)	Z	+ 4' 48"
7	Leonardo Sierra (VEN)	Selle Italia–Eurocar	+ 5' 10"
8	Zenon Jaskuła (POL)	Del Tongo–MG Boys	+ 5' 34"
9	Federico Echave (ESP)	CLAS–Cajastur	+ 6' 05"
10	Marco Giovannetti (ITA)	Chateau d'Ax–Gatorade	+ 8' 20"

== Stage 16 ==
11 June 1991 — Tirano to Selva di Val Gardena, 220 km (140 mi)

Stage 16 result

Rank	Rider	Team	Time
1	Massimiliano Lelli (ITA)	Ariostea	6h 05' 49"
2	Gianni Bugno (ITA)	Chateau d'Ax–Gatorade	s.t.
3	Claudio Chiappucci (ITA)	Carrera Jeans–Tassoni	+ 2"
4	Franco Chioccioli (ITA)	Del Tongo–MG Boys	+ 5"
5	Marino Lejarreta (ESP)	ONCE	s.t.
6	Marco Giovannetti (ITA)	Chateau d'Ax–Gatorade	+ 22"
7	Leonardo Sierra (VEN)	Selle Italia–Eurocar	s.t.
8	Jean-François Bernard (FRA)	Banesto	+ 24"
9	Zenon Jaskuła (POL)	Del Tongo–MG Boys	+ 45"
10	Eduardo Chozas (ESP)	ONCE	+ 50"

General classification after Stage 16

Rank	Rider	Team	Time
1	Franco Chioccioli (ITA)	Del Tongo–MG Boys	78h 43' 11"
2	Marino Lejarreta (ESP)	ONCE	+ 1' 26"
3	Claudio Chiappucci (ITA)	Carrera Jeans–Tassoni	+ 2' 12"
4	Massimiliano Lelli (ITA)	Ariostea	+ 2' 14"
5	Gianni Bugno (ITA)	Chateau d'Ax–Gatorade	+ 3' 24"
6	Leonardo Sierra (VEN)	Selle Italia–Eurocar	+ 5' 27"
7	Éric Boyer (FRA)	Z	+ 5' 39"
8	Zenon Jaskuła (POL)	Del Tongo–MG Boys	+ 6' 14"
9	Federico Echave (ESP)	CLAS–Cajastur	+ 6' 59"
10	Marco Giovannetti (ITA)	Chateau d'Ax–Gatorade	+ 8' 37"

== Stage 17 ==
12 June 1991 — Selva di Val Gardena to Passo Pordoi, 169 km (105 mi)

Stage 17 result

Rank	Rider	Team	Time
1	Franco Chioccioli (ITA)	Del Tongo–MG Boys	5h 09' 40"
2	Claudio Chiappucci (ITA)	Carrera Jeans–Tassoni	+ 38"
3	Éric Boyer (FRA)	Z	+ 41"
4	Massimiliano Lelli (ITA)	Ariostea	+ 1' 12"
5	Roberto Conti (ITA)	Ariostea	+ 1' 26"
6	Marco Giovannetti (ITA)	Chateau d'Ax–Gatorade	+ 2' 14"
7	Leonardo Sierra (VEN)	Selle Italia–Eurocar	+ 2' 18"
8	Jean-François Bernard (FRA)	Banesto	+ 3' 18"
9	Gianni Bugno (ITA)	Chateau d'Ax–Gatorade	+ 3' 33"
10	Nelson Rodríguez (COL)	Pony Malta–Avianca	+ 3' 55"

General classification after Stage 17

Rank	Rider	Team	Time
1	Franco Chioccioli (ITA)	Del Tongo–MG Boys	83h 52' 39"
2	Claudio Chiappucci (ITA)	Carrera Jeans–Tassoni	+ 2' 54"
3	Massimiliano Lelli (ITA)	Ariostea	+ 3' 38"
4	Éric Boyer (FRA)	Z	+ 6' 28"
5	Gianni Bugno (ITA)	Chateau d'Ax–Gatorade	+ 7' 09"
6	Leonardo Sierra (VEN)	Selle Italia–Eurocar	+ 7' 57"
7	Marino Lejarreta (ESP)	ONCE	+ 8' 14"
8	Marco Giovannetti (ITA)	Chateau d'Ax–Gatorade	+ 11' 01"
9	Zenon Jaskuła (POL)	Del Tongo–MG Boys	+ 14' 06"
10	Federico Echave (ESP)	CLAS–Cajastur	+ 15' 12"

== Stage 18 ==
13 June 1991 — Pozza di Fassa to Castelfranco Veneto, 165 km (103 mi)

Stage 18 result

Rank	Rider	Team	Time
1	Silvio Martinello (ITA)	Gis Gelati–Ballan	4h 36' 34"
2	Stefano Allocchio (ITA)	Italbonifica–Navigare	s.t.
3	Ján Svorada (CZE)	Colnago–Lampre	s.t.
4	Mario Cipollini (ITA)	Del Tongo–MG Boys	s.t.
5	Giovanni Fidanza (ITA)	Chateau d'Ax–Gatorade	s.t.
6	Endrio Leoni (ITA)	Jolly Componibili–Club 88	s.t.
7	Jacky Durand (FRA)	Castorama–Raleigh	s.t.
8	Djamolidine Abdoujaparov (URS)	Carrera Jeans–Tassoni	s.t.
9	Roberto Pelliconi (ITA)	Amore & Vita–Fanini	s.t.
10	Gianluca Bortolami (ITA)	Colnago–Lampre	s.t.

General classification after Stage 18

Rank	Rider	Team	Time
1	Franco Chioccioli (ITA)	Del Tongo–MG Boys	88h 29' 13"
2	Claudio Chiappucci (ITA)	Carrera Jeans–Tassoni	+ 2' 54"
3	Massimiliano Lelli (ITA)	Ariostea	+ 3' 38"
4	Éric Boyer (FRA)	Z	+ 6' 28"
5	Gianni Bugno (ITA)	Chateau d'Ax–Gatorade	+ 7' 09"
6	Leonardo Sierra (VEN)	Selle Italia–Eurocar	+ 7' 57"
7	Marino Lejarreta (ESP)	ONCE	+ 8' 14"
8	Marco Giovannetti (ITA)	Chateau d'Ax–Gatorade	+ 11' 01"
9	Zenon Jaskuła (POL)	Del Tongo–MG Boys	+ 14' 06"
10	Federico Echave (ESP)	CLAS–Cajastur	+ 15' 12"

== Stage 19 ==
14 June 1991 — Castelfranco Veneto to Brescia, 186 km (116 mi)

Stage 19 result

Rank	Rider	Team	Time
1	Gianni Bugno (ITA)	Chateau d'Ax–Gatorade	5h 32' 25"
2	Claudio Chiappucci (ITA)	Carrera Jeans–Tassoni	s.t.
3	Massimo Ghirotto (ITA)	Carrera Jeans–Tassoni	s.t.
4	Gianluca Bortolami (ITA)	Colnago–Lampre	s.t.
5	Fabio Bordonali (ITA)	Gis Gelati–Ballan	s.t.
6	Acácio da Silva (POR)	Lotus–Festina	s.t.
7	Marek Szerszyński (POL)	Colnago–Lampre	s.t.
8	Vladimir Poulnikov (URS)	Carrera Jeans–Tassoni	s.t.
9	Marino Lejarreta (ESP)	ONCE	s.t.
10	Stephen Hodge (AUS)	ONCE	s.t.

General classification after Stage 19

Rank	Rider	Team	Time
1	Franco Chioccioli (ITA)	Del Tongo–MG Boys	94h 01' 38"
2	Claudio Chiappucci (ITA)	Carrera Jeans–Tassoni	+ 2' 46"
3	Massimiliano Lelli (ITA)	Ariostea	+ 3' 38"
4	Éric Boyer (FRA)	Z	+ 6' 28"
5	Gianni Bugno (ITA)	Chateau d'Ax–Gatorade	+ 6' 57"
6	Leonardo Sierra (VEN)	Selle Italia–Eurocar	+ 7' 57"
7	Marino Lejarreta (ESP)	ONCE	+ 8' 14"
8	Marco Giovannetti (ITA)	Chateau d'Ax–Gatorade	+ 11' 01"
9	Zenon Jaskuła (POL)	Del Tongo–MG Boys	+ 14' 06"
10	Nelson Rodríguez (COL)	Pony Malta–Avianca	+ 17' 45"

== Stage 20 ==
15 June 1991 — Broni to Casteggio, 66 km (41 mi) (ITT)

Stage 20 result

Rank	Rider	Team	Time
1	Franco Chioccioli (ITA)	Del Tongo–MG Boys	1h 33' 17"
2	Gianni Bugno (ITA)	Chateau d'Ax–Gatorade	+ 52"
3	Claudio Chiappucci (ITA)	Carrera Jeans–Tassoni	+ 1' 02"
4	Marco Giovannetti (ITA)	Chateau d'Ax–Gatorade	+ 2' 08"
5	Marino Lejarreta (ESP)	ONCE	+ 2' 09"
6	Massimiliano Lelli (ITA)	Ariostea	+ 3' 18"
7	Stephen Hodge (AUS)	ONCE	+ 3' 27"
8	Vladimir Poulnikov (URS)	Carrera Jeans–Tassoni	+ 3' 31"
9	Pedro Delgado (ESP)	Banesto	+ 3' 36"
10	Leonardo Sierra (VEN)	Selle Italia–Eurocar	+ 3' 59"

General classification after Stage 20

Rank	Rider	Team	Time
1	Franco Chioccioli (ITA)	Del Tongo–MG Boys	95h 34' 55"
2	Claudio Chiappucci (ITA)	Carrera Jeans–Tassoni	+ 3' 48"
3	Massimiliano Lelli (ITA)	Ariostea	+ 6' 56"
4	Gianni Bugno (ITA)	Chateau d'Ax–Gatorade	+ 7' 49"
5	Marino Lejarreta (ESP)	ONCE	+ 10' 23"
6	Éric Boyer (FRA)	Z	+ 11' 09"
7	Leonardo Sierra (VEN)	Selle Italia–Eurocar	+ 11' 56"
8	Marco Giovannetti (ITA)	Chateau d'Ax–Gatorade	+ 13' 09"
9	Zenon Jaskuła (POL)	Del Tongo–MG Boys	+ 18' 22"
10	Eduardo Chozas (ESP)	ONCE	+ 23' 42"

== Stage 21 ==
16 June 1991 — Pavia to Milan, 153 km (95 mi)

Stage 21 result

Rank	Rider	Team	Time
1	Mario Cipollini (ITA)	Del Tongo–MG Boys	4h 00' 48"
2	Djamolidine Abdoujaparov (URS)	Carrera Jeans–Tassoni	s.t.
3	Endrio Leoni (ITA)	Jolly Componibili–Club 88	s.t.
4	Casimiro Moreda (ESP)	CLAS–Cajastur	s.t.
5	Giovanni Fidanza (ITA)	Chateau d'Ax–Gatorade	s.t.
6	Silvio Martinello (ITA)	Gis Gelati–Ballan	s.t.
7	Fabiano Fontanelli (ITA)	Italbonifica–Navigare	s.t.
8	Stefano Allocchio (ITA)	Italbonifica–Navigare	s.t.
9	Ján Svorada (CZE)	Colnago–Lampre	s.t.
10	Martin Schalkers (NED)	TVM–Sanyo	s.t.

General classification after Stage 21

Rank	Rider	Team	Time
1	Franco Chioccioli (ITA)	Del Tongo–MG Boys	99h 35' 43"
2	Claudio Chiappucci (ITA)	Carrera Jeans–Tassoni	+ 3' 48"
3	Massimiliano Lelli (ITA)	Ariostea	+ 6' 56"
4	Gianni Bugno (ITA)	Chateau d'Ax–Gatorade	+ 7' 49"
5	Marino Lejarreta (ESP)	ONCE	+ 10' 43"
6	Éric Boyer (FRA)	Z	+ 11' 09"
7	Leonardo Sierra (VEN)	Selle Italia–Eurocar	+ 11' 56"
8	Marco Giovannetti (ITA)	Chateau d'Ax–Gatorade	+ 13' 09"
9	Zenon Jaskuła (POL)	Del Tongo–MG Boys	+ 18' 22"
10	Eduardo Chozas (ESP)	ONCE	+ 23' 42"
