= Intergiro classification in the Giro d'Italia =

Bicycle competition

Intergiro Classification Maglia Azzurra (until 2005)
- 1989–2005 from 2024
- Sport: Road Cycling
- Competition: Giro d'Italia
- Discipline: Road
- Awarded for: Winning the Intergiro
- English name: Blue jersey (until 2005)
- Local name: Maglia Azzurra (in Italian) (until 2005)

History
- First award: 1989
- Editions: 17
- First winner: Jure Pavlič (YUG)
- Most wins: Fabrizio Guidi (ITA) (3 wins)
- Most recent: Filippo Fiorelli (ITA)

The Intergiro is a competition in the annual multiple stage bicycle race the Giro d'Italia. It was first introduced in 1989 and discontinued in 2005 as a stand-alone Jersey. It was reintroduced in 2024 as number colour. In its initial inception, the calculation for the intergiro was similar to that of the general classification, in each stage there is a midway point that the riders passed through a point and where their times were stopped. As the race went, their times were compiled and the person with the lowest time was the leader of the intergiro classification and wore a blue jersey until 2005. When the competition was revived in 2024, it was changed to points-based scoring, with competitors accumulating points at the designated midway point. The rider with the most points is the leader of the Intergiro classification.

== Blue jersey (1989–2005) ==
Somewhere in the middle of each stage there were points where the time of the riders were measured, in the same way as is done at the finish of the stage. The only difference is that the racers ride on after the intergiro point to the regular stage finish. Next to a time measurement, there were bonus seconds to earn just like in the regular stage finish until 2005. That way, riders who were in a group in front of the bunch gained time in the intergiro classification, and riders who were often in this position would have a good position in the classification. The leader of the Intergrio classification would wear a blue jersey.

The intergiro was a way for riders, who weren't sprinters or contenders for the GC, to fight for a jersey, and is now similar to a combativity award. There were racers that geared their whole Giro d'Italia to the intergiro classification, and calmly rode to the finish after the intergiro point was passed. The intergiro classification was replaced by a combination classification in the 2006 Giro d'Italia.

== Green number (2024–present) ==
For the 2024 Giro d'Italia, the Intergiro competition was revived, but revamped with points-based scoring. For all stages (excepting individual and team time trials), an Intergiro mid-way arch is set up. The first eight riders to pass under the arch receive points toward the Intergiro competition. These riders also receive the same number of points towards the maglia ciclamino points classification. Additionally, the first three riders to pass the Intergiro arch receive time bonuses towards the general classification, with three seconds awarded to the first, two to the second, and one for the third. The rider with the most Intergiro points wears a green number.

Points are currently scored with 12 points awarded to the first to reach the Intergiro point, followed by 8 points for the next, and the next 6, 5, 4, 3, 2, until the eighth cyclist who receives 1 point.

== Intergiro Standings ==
=== Time-based (1989–2005) ===
List of Intergiro classification winners 1989–2005
Year	First	Time	Second	Time	Third	Time	Ref.
1989	Jure Pavlič (YUG)	49h 50' 00"	Laurent Fignon (FRA)	+ 4' 07"	Claude Criquielion (BEL)	+ 4' 24"	
1990	Phil Anderson (AUS)	47h 56' 08"	Massimo Ghirotto (ITA)	+ 39"	Luca Gelfi (ITA)	+ 3' 33"	
1991	Alberto Leanizbarrutia (ESP)	59h 34' 55"	Claudio Chiappucci (ITA)	+ 9' 36"	Franco Chioccioli (ITA)	+ 9' 39"	
1992	Miguel Indurain (ESP)	57h 38' 08"	Claudio Chiappucci (ITA)	+ 2' 03"	Laurent Bezault (FRA)	+ 2' 08"	
1993	Ján Svorada (SVK)	53h 10' 33"	Stefano Colagè (ITA)	+ 40"	Miguel Indurain (ESP)	+ 41"	
1994	Djamolidine Abdoujaparov (UZB)	62h 00' 39"	Evgeni Berzin (RUS)	+ 44"	Fabiano Fontanelli (ITA)	+ 1' 50"	
1995	Tony Rominger (SUI)	56h 04' 21"	Giovanni Fidanza (ITA)	+ 54"	Evgeni Berzin (RUS)	+ 1' 24"	
1996	Fabrizio Guidi (ITA)	59h 36' 45"	Fabrizio Bontempi (ITA)	+ 15"	Mauro Bettin (ITA)	+ 1' 37"	
1997	Dimitri Konyshev (RUS)	52h 48' 18"	Mario Cipollini (ITA)	+ 3' 01"	Glenn Magnusson (SWE)	+ 3' 15"	
1998	Gian Matteo Fagnini (ITA)	62h 32' 12"	Mariano Piccoli (ITA)	+ 55"	Nicola Loda (ITA)	+ 2' 29"	
1999	Fabrizio Guidi (ITA)	58h 47' 30"	Massimo Strazzer (ITA)	+ 2"	Gian Matteo Fagnini (ITA)	+ 24"	
2000	Fabrizio Guidi (ITA)	62h 50' 05"	Dimitri Konyshev (RUS)	+ 57"	Diego Ferrari (ITA)	+ 1' 38"	
2001	Massimo Strazzer (ITA)	51h 27' 14"	Stefano Zanini (ITA)	+ 2' 49"	Moreno Di Biase (ITA)	+ 2' 49"	
2002	Massimo Strazzer (ITA)	55h 05' 46"	Serhiy Honchar (UKR)	+ 4' 26"	Aitor González (ESP)	+ 4' 41"	
2003	Magnus Bäckstedt (SWE)	50h 20' 37"	Ján Svorada (CZE)	+ 2' 02"	Constantino Zaballa (ESP)	+ 2' 26"	
2004	Raffaele Illiano (ITA)	49h 38' 14"	Crescenzo D'Amore (ITA)	+ 13"	Mariano Piccoli (ITA)	+ 19"	
2005	Stefano Zanini (ITA)	54h 37' 01"	Paolo Bettini (ITA)	+ 27"	Sven Krauß (GER)	+ 30"	
2006-2023 not held

=== Points-based (2024–present) ===
List of Intergiro classification winners 2024–present
Year	First	Points	Second	Points	Third	Points	Ref.
2024	Filippo Fiorelli (ITA)	59	Julian Alaphilippe (FRA)	48	Andrea Pietrobon (ITA)	44	
