= Daniel Wyder =

Swiss cyclist

Personal information
- Born: 15 February 1962 (age 64) Wädenswil, Switzerland

Cycling career
- Sport: Cycling
- Current team: Retired
- Disciplines: Road and track
- Role: Rider

Professional teams
- 1984–1985: Cilo–Aufina
- 1986: Hitachi–Marc
- 1987: Transvemij–Van Schilt
- 1988: Isoglass–EVS–Robland
- 1989: Eurocar–Mosoca–Galli
- 1990–1991: Selle Italia–Eurocar
- 1992: ZG Mobili–Selle Italia
Medal record
Representing Switzerland
Men's track cycling
World Championships
Gold medal – first place	1988 Ghent	Points race

Daniel Wyder (born 15 February 1962) is a Swiss former racing cyclist. Professional from 1984 to 1992, he won the points race at the 1988 UCI Track Cycling World Championships and rode in five editions of the Giro d'Italia.

== Major results ==
1980
1st Junior National Road Race Championships
1981
1st Tour du Jura
1983
1st Overall Ronde de l'Isard
1986
2nd Overall Circuit de la Sarthe
6th Overall Tour of Belgium
1988
1st Points race, World Track Championships
1st Individual pursuit, National Track Championships
2nd GP Lugano
1989
7th Overall Tour de Suisse

=== Grand Tour general classification results timeline ===
Grand Tour	1984	1985	1986	1987	1988	1989	1990	1991
Vuelta a España	—	—	—	—	—	—	—	—
Giro d'Italia	80	73	—	72	58	—	—	87
Tour de France	—	—	—	—	—	—	—	—

Legend
—	Did not compete
DNF	Did not finish
