= 1992 Tirreno–Adriatico =

Race details
- Dates: 11–18 March 1992
- Stages: 8
- Distance: 1,166.8 km (725.0 mi)
- Winning time: 31h 05' 54"

Results
	Winner	Rolf Sørensen (DEN)	(Ariostea)
	Second	Raúl Alcalá (MEX)	(PDM–Ultima–Concorde)
	Third	Fabian Jeker (SUI)	(Helvetia–Fichtel & Sachs)

The 1992 Tirreno–Adriatico was the 27th edition of the Tirreno–Adriatico cycle race and was held from 11 March to 18 March 1992. The race started in Lido di Ostia and finished in San Benedetto del Tronto. The race was won by Rolf Sørensen of the Ariostea team.

== General classification ==
Final general classification

Rank	Rider	Team	Time
1	Rolf Sørensen (DEN)	Ariostea	31h 05' 54"
2	Raúl Alcalá (MEX)	PDM–Ultima–Concorde	+ 13"
3	Fabian Jeker (SUI)	Helvetia–Fichtel & Sachs	+ 34"
4	Andrea Chiurato (ITA)	Gatorade–Chateau d'Ax	+ 1' 06"
5	Davide Cassani (ITA)	Ariostea	+ 1' 08"
6	Beat Zberg (SUI)	Helvetia–Fichtel & Sachs	+ 1' 15"
7	Laurent Brochard (FRA)	Castorama	+ 1' 16"
8	Stephen Roche (IRL)	Carrera Jeans–Vagabond	+ 1' 22"
9	Gianluca Pierobon (ITA)	ZG Mobili–Selle Italia	+ 1' 28"
10	Leonardo Sierra (VEN)	ZG Mobili–Selle Italia	+ 1' 39"
