= 1991 Giro d'Italia =

Race details
- Dates: 26 May — 16 June 1991
- Stages: 21, including one split stage
- Distance: 3,715 km (2,308 mi)
- Winning time: 99h 35' 43"

Results
Jersey awarded to the overall winner	Winner	Franco Chioccioli (ITA)	(Del Tongo-MG Boys Maglificio)
	Second	Claudio Chiappucci (ITA)	(Carrera Jeans–Tassoni)
	Third	Massimiliano Lelli (ITA)	(Ari-Ceramiche Ariostea)
Jersey awarded to the points classification winner	Points	Claudio Chiappucci (ITA)	(Carrera Jeans–Tassoni)
Jersey awarded to the mountains classification winner	Mountains	Iñaki Gastón (ESP)	(CLAS–Cajastur)
Jersey awarded to the youth classification winner	Youth	Massimiliano Lelli (ITA)	(Ari-Ceramiche Ariostea)
Jersey awarded to the intergiro classification winner	Intergiro	Alberto Leanizbarrutia (ESP)	(CLAS–Cajastur)
	Team	Carrera Jeans–Tassoni	

The 1991 Giro d'Italia was the 74th edition of the race. It began on May 26 with a mass-start stage that began and ended in the Italian city of Olbia. The race came to a close in Milan on June 16. Twenty teams entered the race, which was won by the Italian Franco Chioccioli of the Del Tongo-MG Boys Maglificio team. Second and third respectively were the Italians Claudio Chiappucci and Massimiliano Lelli.

The race was first led by Frenchman Philippe Casado who won the first stage into Olbia. Casado lost the race leader's maglia rosa (English: pink jersey) after stage 2a that contained a mountainous course. Éric Boyer took the race lead from Chioccioli after winning the event's fourth stage. However, he lost the lead back to Chioccioli the following day. Chioccioli protected his lead and built upon his advantage by winning three stages of the race before the race's finish.

In the race's other classifications, Massimiliano Lelli of the Ari-Ceramiche Ariostea team finished as the best rider aged 25 or under in the general classification, finishing in third place overall; Carrera Jeans–Tassoni rider Claudio Chiappucci won the points classification, Iñaki Gastón of the CLAS–Cajastur team won the mountains classification, and CLAS–Cajastur rider Alberto Leanizbarrutia won the intergiro classification. Carrera Jeans-Tassoni finished as the winners of the team classification.

== Teams ==
Twenty teams were invited by the race organizers to participate in the 1991 edition of the Giro d'Italia, ten of which were based outside of Italy. Each team sent a squad of nine riders, which meant that the race started with a peloton of 180 cyclists. Italy (84), Spain (30), and France (18) all had more than 10 riders. Of these, 76 were riding the Giro d'Italia for the first time. The average age of riders was 27.03 years, ranging from 22–year–old Eleuterio Anguita (Seur–Otero) to 36–year–old Gilbert Duclos-Lassalle (Z). The team with the youngest average rider age was ZG Mobili–Bottecchia (25), while the oldest was Z (28). The presentation of the teams – where each team's roster and manager were introduced in front the media and local dignitaries – took place on 25 May. From the riders that began the race, 133 made it to the finish in Milan.

The teams entering the race were:

- Amore & Vita–Fanini
- Ariostea
- Banesto
- Carrera Jeans–Tassoni
- Castorama–Raleigh
- Chateau d'Ax–Gatorade
- Colnago–Lampre
- Del Tongo–MG Boys
- Gis Gelati–Ballan
- Italbonifica–Navigare
- Jolly Componibili–Club 88
- Lotus–Festina
- ONCE
- CLAS–Cajastur
- Pony Malta–Avianca
- Selle Italia–Magniarredo–Vetta
- Seur–Otero
- TVM–Sanyo
- ZG Mobili–Bottecchia
- Z

== Pre-race favorites ==
The starting peloton did include the previous year's winner Gianni Bugno. Claudio Chiappucci was believed to be in great form coming into the race. According to Paolo Viberti of El País, Bugno came in as the odds on favorite to win the race. Going into the race, it was widely believed that the winner would be either Chiappucci or Bugno. Despite being favored to win the race, Bugno entered the race with no victories to his name that season. American Greg LeMond told the press he planned to be more competitive at this Giro than he had in years past. Other favorites to win the race were Laurent Fignon, Pedro Delgado, and Marino Lejarreta. Mario Cipollini, despite a poor showing that Tour de Romandie, was viewed as the sprinter to watch for the estimated ten stages that could result in a bunch sprint. Notable absences included 1988 winner Andrew Hampsten, Dutch rider Erik Breukink, and Maurizio Fondriest.

== Route and stages ==
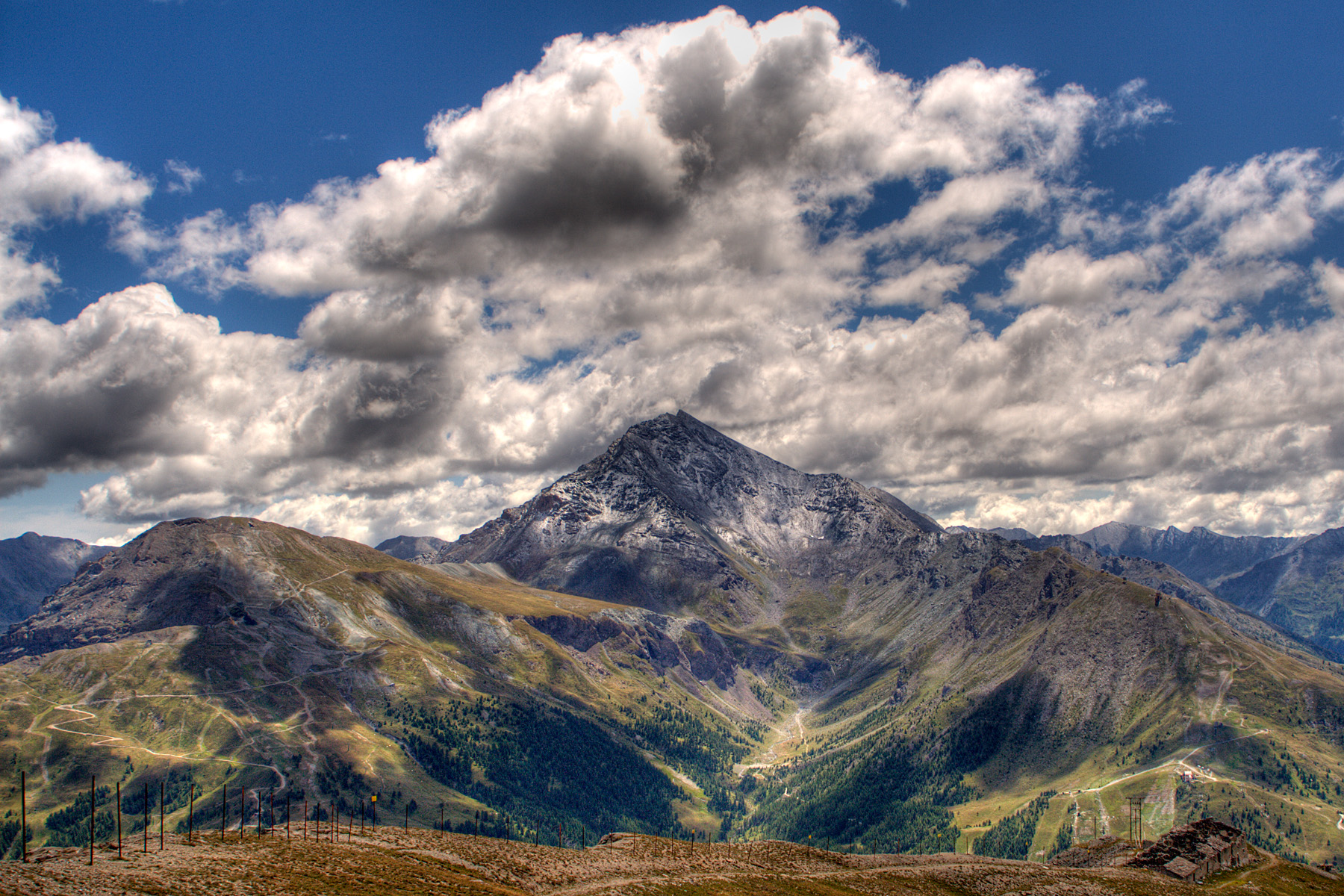
The nineteenth stage, a 192 km (119 mi) mass-start stage, began in Savigliano and finished in the mountainous village Sestriere (pictured).

The route for the 1991 edition of the Giro d'Italia was revealed to the public on television by head organizer Vincenzo Torriani, on 1 December 1990. It contained three time trial events, all of which were individual. There were twelve stages containing 39 categorized climbs, of which five had summit finishes: stage 12, to Monviso; stage 13, to Sestriere; stage 15, to Aprica; stage 16, to Selva di Val Gardena; and stage 17, to Passo Pordoi. The organizers chose to include one rest day, which was used to transfer the riders from Cagliari to Sorrento. When compared to the previous year's race, the race was 265 km (165 mi) shorter, contained one more rest day, and the same number of individual time trials and split-stages. The race covered 120 km (75 mi) in time trail stages. In addition, this race contained one more stage. The race started on the island of Sardinia for the first time in race history and stayed on the island for three days of racing.

Capodacqua of La Repubblica believed that the route favored a rider that could defend well and put in a good time during the uphill time trial. La Stampa writer Gianni Ranieri felt the two non-uphill time trials would favor Gianni Bugno, while the up-hill time trial could be a place where Claudio Chiappucci could gain time on the field. Pedro Delgado believed the race to be tougher than the Tour de France that same year. The Cima Coppi – the highest point in altitude the race reached – was scheduled to be the Stelvio Pass, but the pass was scrapped from the race and the Passo Pordoi – the next highest mountain – became the new Cima Coppi. The queen stage was thought to be twelfth leg from Savona to Pian del Re as the final climb was 18.5 km (11 mi) at an average gradient of 7.5%. The Pordoi Pass in the seventeenth stage was the highest climb and was crossed twice. A writer for l'Impartial wrote that shorter stages might contain more attacks and general classification impact, specifically the writer stated that the fifteenth stage would be an important stage as it climbed the Mortirolo Pass from the harder side, from Valteline.

Stage characteristics and winners
Stage	Date	Course	Distance	Type	Winner
1	26 May	Olbia to Olbia	193 km (120 mi)	Stage with mountain(s)	Philippe Casado (FRA)
2a	27 May	Olbia to Sassari	127 km (79 mi)	Stage with mountain(s)	Gianni Bugno (ITA)
2b	27 May	Sassari	7 km (4 mi)	Individual time trial	Gianluca Pierobon (ITA)
3	28 May	Sassari to Cagliari	231 km (144 mi)	Plain stage	Mario Cipollini (ITA)
	29 May	Rest day			
4	30 May	Sorrento to Sorrento	170 km (106 mi)	Stage with mountain(s)	Éric Boyer (FRA)
5	31 May	Sorrento to Scanno	246 km (153 mi)	Stage with mountain(s)	Marino Lejarreta (ESP)
6	1 June	Scanno to Rieti	205 km (127 mi)	Stage with mountain(s)	Vladimir Poulnikov (URS)
7	2 June	Rieti to Città di Castello	174 km (108 mi)	Plain stage	Mario Cipollini (ITA)
8	3 June	Città di Castello to Prato	169 km (105 mi)	Plain stage	Davide Cassani (ITA)
9	4 June	Prato to Felino	229 km (142 mi)	Stage with mountain(s)	Massimo Ghirotto (ITA)
10	5 June	Collecchio to Langhirano	43 km (27 mi)	Individual time trial	Gianni Bugno (ITA)
11	6 June	Sala Baganza to Savona	223 km (139 mi)	Plain stage	Maximilian Sciandri (ITA)
12	7 June	Savona to Pian del Re	182 km (113 mi)	Stage with mountain(s)	Massimiliano Lelli (ITA)
13	8 June	Savigliano to Sestriere	192 km (119 mi)	Stage with mountain(s)	Eduardo Chozas (ESP)
14	9 June	Turin to Morbegno	239 km (149 mi)	Plain stage	Franco Ballerini (ITA)
15	10 June	Morbegno to Aprica	132 km (82 mi)	Stage with mountain(s)	Franco Chioccioli (ITA)
16	11 June	Tirano to Selva di Val Gardena	220 km (137 mi)	Stage with mountain(s)	Massimiliano Lelli (ITA)
17	12 June	Selva di Val Gardena to Passo Pordoi	169 km (105 mi)	Stage with mountain(s)	Franco Chioccioli (ITA)
18	13 June	Pozza di Fassa to Castelfranco Veneto	165 km (103 mi)	Plain stage	Silvio Martinello (ITA)
19	14 June	Castelfranco Veneto to Brescia	185 km (115 mi)	Stage with mountain(s)	Gianni Bugno (ITA)
20	15 June	Broni to Casteggio	66 km (41 mi)	Individual time trial	Franco Chioccioli (ITA)
21	16 June	Pavia to Milan	153 km (95 mi)	Plain stage	Mario Cipollini (ITA)
	Total		3,715 km (2,308 mi)		

== Race overview ==
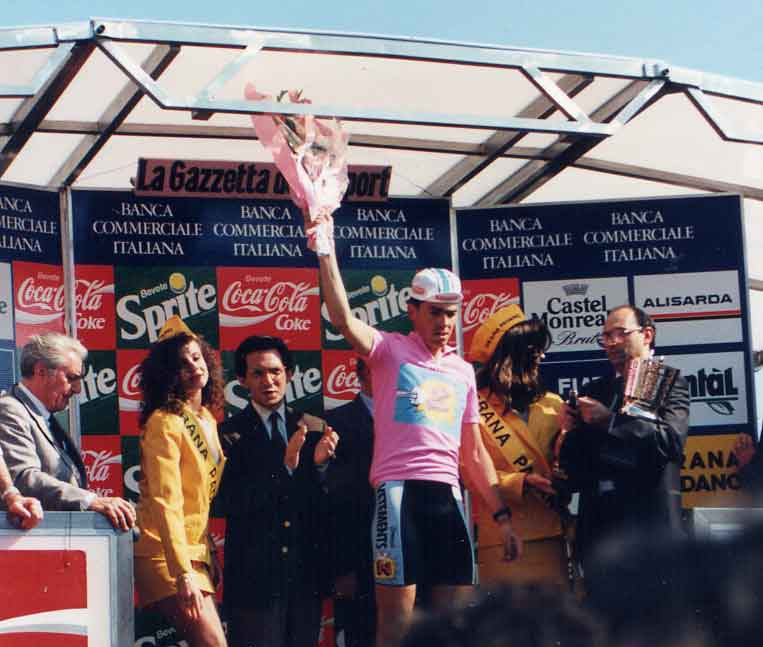
Z's Philippe Casado shown after being presented with the race leader's maglia rosa (English: pink jersey) from winning the race's opening leg

During the first stage, Alberto Leanizbarrutia attacked on his own and led the race for 150 km (93 mi) before being caught by the chasing peloton within the final ten kilometers. It then came down to a bunch sprint finish that was so close that it required a photo to determine the winner, Philippe Casado. The next day of racing consisted of a mass-start stage in the morning and an individual time trial in the afternoon. Reigning winner Gianni Bugno won the trans-alpine morning stage ahead of other main contenders. This stage saw the race leader's maglia rosa (English: pink jersey) switch from Casado to Franco Chioccioli. Gianluca Pierobon of ZG Mobili team won the afternoon time trial by five seconds over Spaniard Marino Lejarreta. The following day of racing was the last on the island of Sardinia before the race was transferred to mainland Italy. The day of racing ended with a bunch sprint contested by Adriano Baffi, Mario Cipollini, and Djamolidine Abdoujaparov, of which Cipollini got the best and won.

The fourth leg of the event consisted of five laps on a set circuit of 35 km (22 mi). The stage saw several attacks on the final lap of the course with most being caught by the peloton. Éric Boyer attacked with fifteen kilometers to go in the stage and was able to establish a solid gap between himself and the peloton. Boyer went on to win the stage by 23 seconds over the chasing peloton, gaining enough time to earn the race lead. The following day saw the general classification contenders reach the final climb of the day, Mount Godi, together. Chioccioli attacked on the climb and only Lejarreta was able to mark his move. The two rode to the finish together as Boyer led the group of chasing riders to the finish 50 seconds later. Lejarreta won the stage and Chioccioli regained the race lead.

The sixth day of racing was marred by poor weather. General classification contenders Pedro Delgado and Laurent Fignon lost time due to crashing on the descent of Monte Terminillo, while Greg LeMond lost over two minutes. On the final climb of the day, Iñaki Gastón and Leonardo Sierra attacked with eight kilometers to go but were caught by the chasing riders. Gaston attacked again with a kilometer remaining, but was robbed of the stage win as Vladimir Poulnikov overtook him three meters before the finish. Cipollini won the event's seventh leg by means of a field sprint.

The following stage saw a group of nine riders form off the front of the peloton with under 20 kilometers remaining. Despite the best efforts of the chasing peloton, the breakaway group survived and saw Ari-Ceramiche Ariostea's Davide Cassani take the stage by edging out Mario Mantova. Massimo Ghirotto of Carrera Jeans–Tassoni team attacked with about 50 kilometers to go in the ninth stage. He rode solo and wound up winning the stage, while the general classification remained largely unchanged. The next stage was a 43 km (27 mi) individual time trial that was won by Bugno. He won by margin of eight seconds and moved up into second place overall, a second off the leader Chioccioli.

The eleventh stage was contested in rainy conditions on a winding course. After an unsuccessful breakaway attempt by 15 riders, Maximilian Sciandri, LeMond, and Michele Coppolillo attacked and formed a group off the front. Sciandri and LeMond crossed the line in first and second, respectively, while Coppolillo was caught by the peloton in the closing meters of the stage. The next day saw the race's first mountain-top finish, to Monviso. The group of main contenders reached the final climb together, with Banesto's Jean-François Bernard launching the first attack which saw him gain a maximum advantage of around 30 seconds. The next to make a serious effort was Lejarreta, who was followed by Chioccioli, Massimiliano Lelli, and Sierra, who attacked with ten kilometers left in the stage. The trio caught up to Bernard and rode as a group to the finish. Lelli took the stage as Chioccioli defended his lead. Bugno lost almost two minutes during the day.

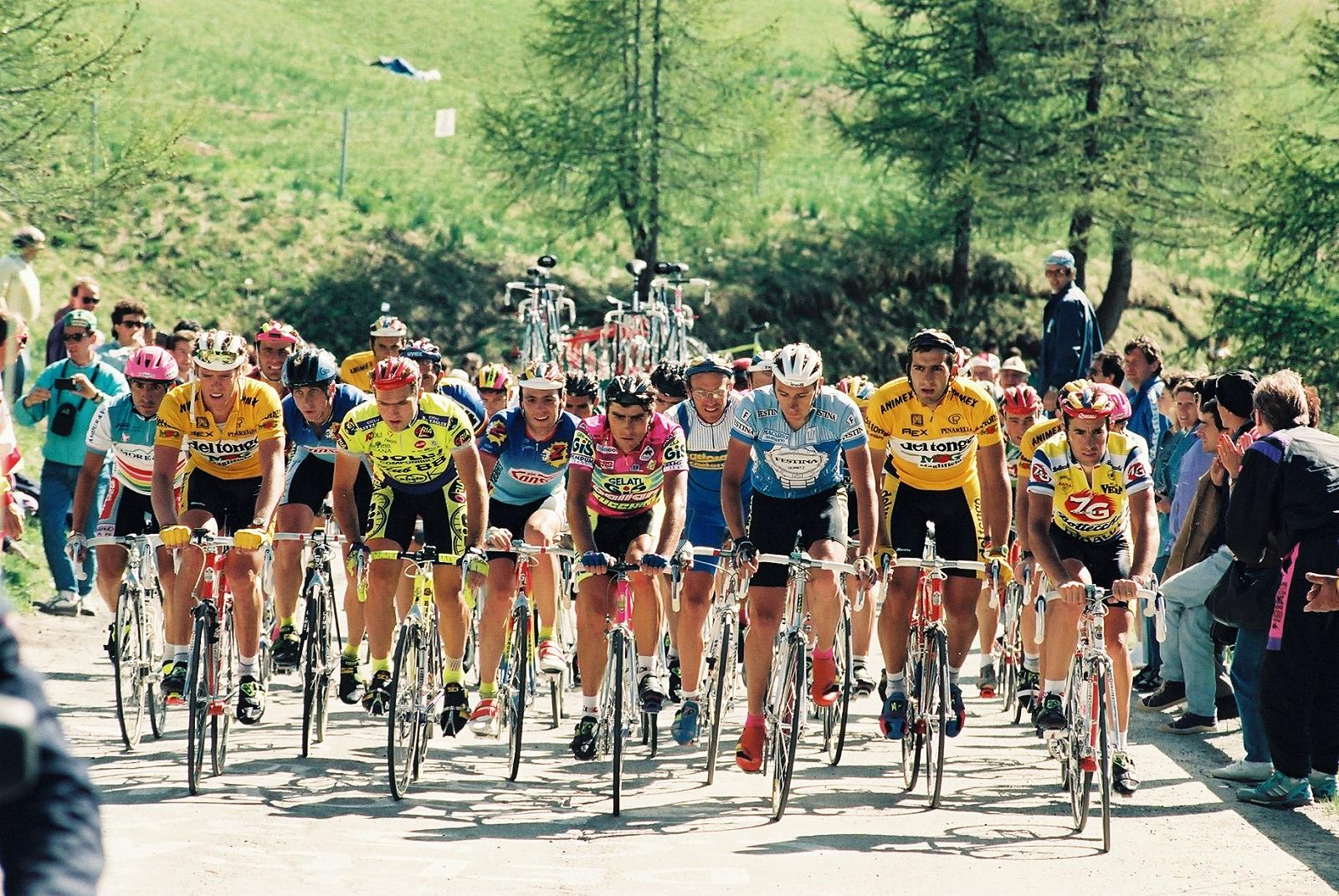
The autobus climbing Sestriere during the thirteenth stage that saw the Alpine mountain crossed twice.

The thirteenth leg of the race featured two ascents of the Alpine mountain Sestriere, the second of which served as the finish for the day. The day began with a breakaway of twelve that was caught before the final climb to Sestriere. The first rider to launch a serious attack on the climb was Pedro Delgado, who was quickly followed by Chioccioli, Lejaretta, Eduardo Chozas, and Chiappucci, meanwhile Bugno was unable to follow their wheels. Chozas managed to win the stage as the group of four finish within four seconds of each other. With 20 kilometers to go in the fourteenth leg, Franco Ballerini, Casado, Juan Martínez Oliver, and Brian Peterson formed a breakaway group. The group managed to stretch out an advantage of almost two minutes as they entered the closing kilometers. Ballerini took the stage victory after he and Casado had managed to distance themselves slightly from the two other breakaway riders. LeMond abandoned the race following the conclusion of the fourteenth stage. The next day, on the ascent of the Mortirolo, race leader Chioccioli attacked and formed a solo attack. He rode the remaining 50 kilometers on his own to the stage victory, with his lead expanding to at most two minutes 30 seconds. He managed to put over a minute into each of his rivals.

The sixteenth saw no major shifts in the general classification. The top five riders in the general classification formed a leading group on the final climb but there were no major moves to create time gaps. Lelli took the stage win after ahead of Bugno. The following day was the last in the Dolomites and saw the ascension of five major climbs, including the Cima Coppi Passo Pordoi. On the second climbing of Pordoi, Chioccioli attacked and rode to the top of the climb to win the stage by thirty-eight seconds. Lejaretta crashed on the day and lost over six and a half minutes, putting him out of contention for the podium and overall victory. Midway through the stage, Fignon abandoned the race. The eighteenth day of racing was a transition stage. Several attempts were made to form a breakaway group before a group of eight were successful in creating a gap. The group was caught with five hundred meters to go by the chasing peloton which was setting up for a field sprint. Silvio Martinello managed to outsprint the likes of Cipollini and Abdoujaparov to win the day.

The nineteenth leg featured only one categorized climb, which Iñaki Gastón won to seal his victory in the mountains classification. The stage saw no major time disparities in the general classification contenders as they finished together, with Bugno taking the stage win. The penultimate stage of the race was a 66 km (41 mi) individual time trial that contained one un-categorized climb within the route. Race leader Chioccioli took the course and at the first time check at 15.5 km (10 mi) he had already put 30 seconds into Bugno. He ended up winning the stage by 50 seconds over Bugno, thereby extending his lead over the rest of his competitors. The final stage culminated with a bunch sprint that was won by Cipollini. Chioccioli had won the Giro d'Italia for the first time by almost four minutes over the second-place finisher Chiappucci.

Four riders achieved multiple stage victories: Cipollini (stages 3, 7, and 21), Bugno (stages 2a, 10, and 19), Lelli (stages 12 and 16), and Chioccioli (stages 15, 17, and 20). Stage wins were achieved by eight of the 20 competing squads, six of which won multiple stages. Del Tongo-MG Boys Maglificio collected a total of seven stage wins through three riders, Cipollini, Ballerini (stage 14), and Chioccioli. Carrera Jeans-Tassoni earned three stage wins through Poulnikov (stage 6), Ghirotto (stage 9), and Sciandri (stage 11). Ari-Ceramiche Ariostea achieved the same feat through Cassani (stage 8) and Lelli. Chateau d'Ax-Gatorade garnered three stage victories through Bugno. Z amassed a total of two stage victories through Casado (stage 1) and Boyer (stage 4). ONCE gained two stage victories through Lejaretta (stage 5) and Chozas (stage 13). ZG Mobili and Gis Gelati-Ballan each won a single stage at the Giro, the first through Pierobon (stage 2b) and the second through Martinello (stage 18).

== Classification leadership ==
Five different jerseys were worn during the 1991 Giro d'Italia. The leader of the general classification – calculated by adding the stage finish times of each rider, and allowing time bonuses for the first three finishers on mass-start stages – wore a pink jersey. This classification is the most important of the race, and its winner is considered as the winner of the Giro. The time bonuses for the 1991 Giro were twelve seconds for first, eight seconds for second, and four seconds for third place on the stage. The winner of the general classification received 1.7 million francs.

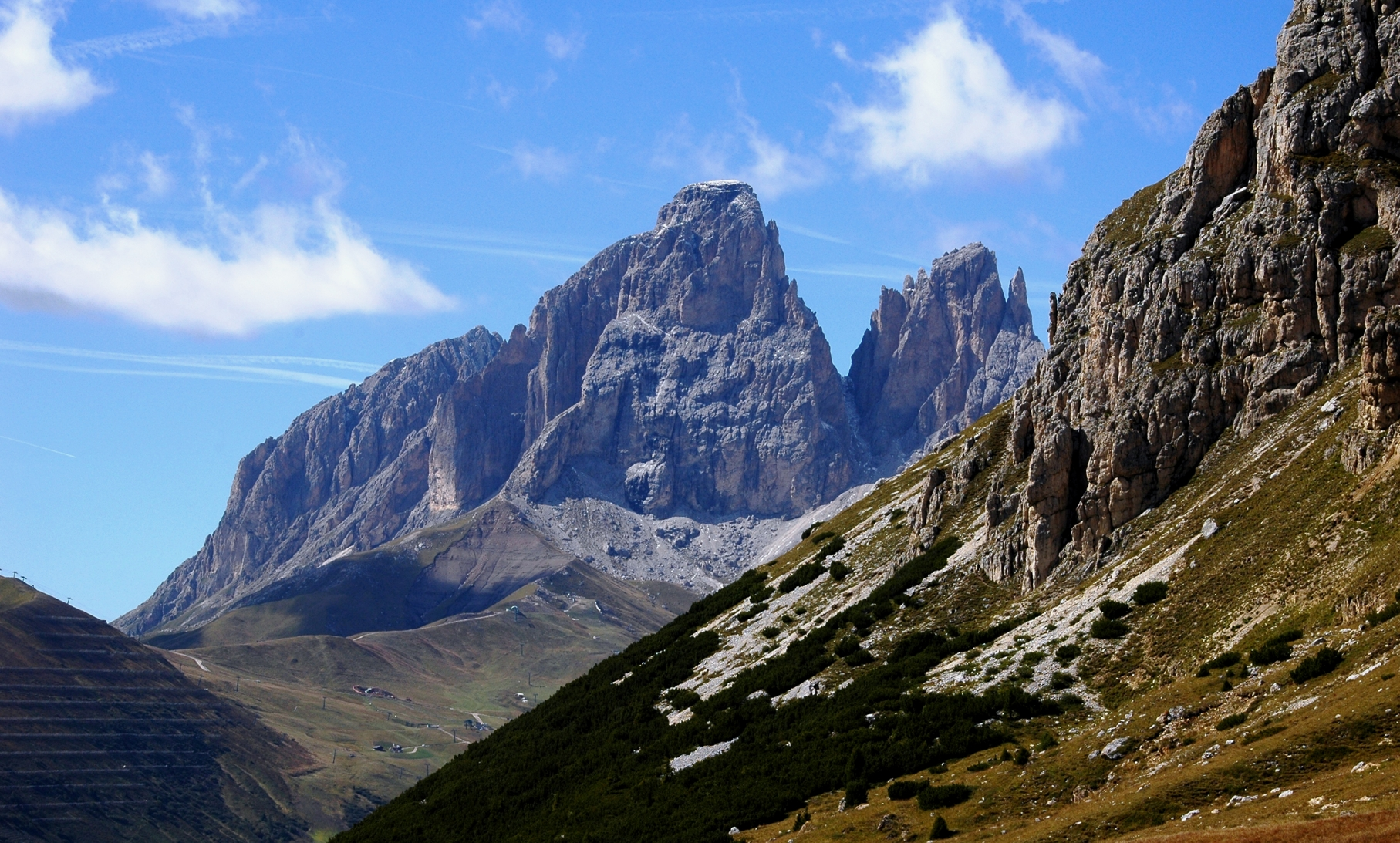
The Pordoi Pass was the Cima Coppi for the 1991 running of the Giro d'Italia.

For the points classification, which awarded a purple (or cyclamen) jersey to its leader, cyclists were given points for finishing a stage in the top 15; additional points could also be won in intermediate sprints. The green jersey was awarded to the mountains classification leader. In this ranking, points were won by reaching the summit of a climb ahead of other cyclists. Each climb was ranked as either first, second or third category, with more points available for higher category climbs. The Cima Coppi, the race's highest point of elevation, awarded more points than the other first category climbs. The Cima Coppi for this Giro was the Passo Pordoi. It was crossed twice by the riders, for the first climbing of the mountain, Italian Franco Vona was the first over the climb, while Franco Chioccioli was first over the second passing. The white jersey was worn by the leader of young rider classification, a ranking decided the same way as the general classification, but only riders born after 1 January 1967 were eligible for it.

The intergiro classification was marked by a blue jersey. The calculation for the intergiro is similar to that of the general classification, in each stage there is a midway point that the riders pass through a point and where their time is stopped. As the race goes on, their times compiled and the person with the lowest time is the leader of the intergiro classification and wears the blue jersey. Although no jersey was awarded, there was also one classification for the teams, in which the stage finish times of the best three cyclists per team were added; the leading team was the one with the lowest total time.

The rows in the following table correspond to the jerseys awarded after that stage was run.

Classification leadership by stage
Stage	Winner	General classification	Points classification	Mountains classification	Young rider classification	Intergiro classification	Team classification
1	Philippe Casado	Philippe Casado	Philippe Casado	Alberto Leanizbarrutia	Gianluca Bortolami	Alberto Leanizbarrutia	Selle Italia-Magniarredo-Vetta
2a	Gianluca Pierobon	Franco Chioccioli	Franco Chioccioli	Alberto Leanizbarrutia	Gianluca Bortolami	Alberto Leanizbarrutia	Carrera Jeans–Tassoni
2b	Mario Cipollini	Franco Chioccioli	Franco Chioccioli	Alberto Leanizbarrutia	Gianluca Bortolami	Alberto Leanizbarrutia	Carrera Jeans–Tassoni
3	Eduardo Chozas	Franco Chioccioli	Franco Chioccioli	Alberto Leanizbarrutia	Gianluca Bortolami	Alberto Leanizbarrutia	Carrera Jeans–Tassoni
4	Éric Boyer	Éric Boyer	Claudio Chiappucci	Alberto Leanizbarrutia	Gianluca Bortolami	Alberto Leanizbarrutia	Z
5	Marino Lejarreta	Franco Chioccioli	Claudio Chiappucci	Acácio da Silva	Massimiliano Lelli	Alberto Leanizbarrutia	ONCE
6	Vladimir Poulnikov	Franco Chioccioli	Franco Chioccioli	Acácio da Silva	Massimiliano Lelli	Alberto Leanizbarrutia	Carrera Jeans–Tassoni
7	Mario Cipollini	Franco Chioccioli	Claudio Chiappucci	Acácio da Silva	Massimiliano Lelli	Alberto Leanizbarrutia	Carrera Jeans–Tassoni
8	Davide Cassani	Franco Chioccioli	Claudio Chiappucci	Acácio da Silva	Massimiliano Lelli	Alberto Leanizbarrutia	Carrera Jeans–Tassoni
9	Massimo Ghirotto	Franco Chioccioli	Claudio Chiappucci	Acácio da Silva	Massimiliano Lelli	Alberto Leanizbarrutia	Carrera Jeans–Tassoni
10	Gianni Bugno	Franco Chioccioli	Claudio Chiappucci	Acácio da Silva	Massimiliano Lelli	Alberto Leanizbarrutia	Carrera Jeans–Tassoni
11	Maximilian Sciandri	Franco Chioccioli	Claudio Chiappucci	Acácio da Silva	Massimiliano Lelli	Alberto Leanizbarrutia	Carrera Jeans–Tassoni
12	Massimiliano Lelli	Franco Chioccioli	Claudio Chiappucci	Acácio da Silva	Massimiliano Lelli	Alberto Leanizbarrutia	Carrera Jeans–Tassoni
13	Eduardo Chozas	Franco Chioccioli	Claudio Chiappucci	Iñaki Gastón	Massimiliano Lelli	Alberto Leanizbarrutia	Carrera Jeans–Tassoni
14	Franco Ballerini	Franco Chioccioli	Claudio Chiappucci	Iñaki Gastón	Massimiliano Lelli	Alberto Leanizbarrutia	Carrera Jeans–Tassoni
15	Franco Chioccioli	Franco Chioccioli	Claudio Chiappucci	Iñaki Gastón	Massimiliano Lelli	Alberto Leanizbarrutia	ONCE
16	Massimiliano Lelli	Franco Chioccioli	Claudio Chiappucci	Iñaki Gastón	Massimiliano Lelli	Alberto Leanizbarrutia	ONCE
17	Franco Chioccioli	Franco Chioccioli	Claudio Chiappucci	Iñaki Gastón	Massimiliano Lelli	Alberto Leanizbarrutia	Carrera Jeans–Vagabond
18	Silvio Martinello	Franco Chioccioli	Claudio Chiappucci	Iñaki Gastón	Massimiliano Lelli	Alberto Leanizbarrutia	Carrera Jeans–Vagabond
19	Gianni Bugno	Franco Chioccioli	Claudio Chiappucci	Iñaki Gastón	Massimiliano Lelli	Alberto Leanizbarrutia	Carrera Jeans–Vagabond
20	Franco Chioccioli	Franco Chioccioli	Claudio Chiappucci	Iñaki Gastón	Massimiliano Lelli	Alberto Leanizbarrutia	Carrera Jeans–Vagabond
21	Mario Cipollini	Franco Chioccioli	Claudio Chiappucci	Iñaki Gastón	Massimiliano Lelli	Alberto Leanizbarrutia	Carrera Jeans–Vagabond
Final		Franco Chioccioli	Claudio Chiappucci	Iñaki Gastón	Massimiliano Lelli	Alberto Leanizbarrutia	Carrera Jeans–Tassoni

== Final standings ==
Legend
A pink jersey	Denotes the winner of the General classification	A green jersey	Denotes the winner of the Mountains classification
A purple jersey	Denotes the winner of the Points classification	A white jersey	Denotes the winner of the Young rider classification
A blue jersey	Denotes the winner of the Intergiro classification		

=== General classification ===
Final general classification (1–10)
Rank	Name	Team	Time
1	Franco Chioccioli (ITA)	Del Tongo-MG Boys Maglificio	99h 35' 43"
2	Claudio Chiappucci (ITA)	Carrera Jeans–Tassoni	+ 3' 48"
3	Massimiliano Lelli (ITA)	Ari-Ceramiche Ariostea	+ 6' 56"
4	Gianni Bugno (ITA)	Chateau d'Ax–Gatorade	+ 7' 49"
5	Marino Lejarreta (ESP)	ONCE	+ 10' 23"
6	Éric Boyer (FRA)	Z	+ 11' 09"
7	Leonardo Sierra (VEN)	Selle Italia-Magniarredo-Vetta	+ 11' 56"
8	Marco Giovannetti (ITA)	Chateau d'Ax–Gatorade	+ 13' 03"
9	Zenon Jaskuła (POL)	Del Tongo-MG Boys Maglificio	+ 18' 22"
10	Eduardo Chozas Olmo (ESP)	ONCE	+ 23' 42"

=== Points classification ===
Final points classification (1–10)
	Rider	Team	Points
1	Claudio Chiappucci (ITA)	Carrera Jeans–Tassoni	283
2	Franco Chioccioli (ITA)	Del Tongo-MG Boys Maglificio	239
3	Mario Cipollini (ITA)	Del Tongo-MG Boys Maglificio	191
4	Gianni Bugno (ITA)	Chateau d'Ax–Gatorade	189
5	Marino Lejarreta (ESP)	ONCE	143
6	Massimiliano Lelli (ITA)	Ari-Ceramiche Ariostea	131
7	Jean-François Bernard (FRA)	Banesto	124
8	Éric Boyer (FRA)	Z	115
9	Gianluca Bortolami (ITA)	Colnago–Lampre	110
10	Silvio Martinello (ITA)	Italbonifica–Navigare	94

=== Mountains classification ===
Final mountains classification (1–10)
	Rider	Team	Points
1	Iñaki Gastón (ESP)	CLAS–Cajastur	75
2	Claudio Chiappucci (ITA)	Carrera Jeans–Tassoni	69
3	Franco Chioccioli (ITA)	Del Tongo-MG Boys Maglificio	57
4	Acácio da Silva (POR)	Lotus–Festina	46
5	Massimiliano Lelli (ITA)	Ari-Ceramiche Ariostea	38
6	Marino Lejarreta (ESP)	ONCE	26
7	Gianni Bugno (ITA)	Chateau d'Ax–Gatorade	19
8	Marco Giovannetti (ITA)	Chateau d'Ax–Gatorade	18
9	Franco Vona (ITA)	Jolly Componibili-Club 88	14
9	Eduardo Chozas (ESP)	ONCE	14
9	Francisco Espinosa (ESP)	CLAS–Cajastur	14

=== Young rider classification ===
Final young rider classification (1–5)
	Rider	Team	Time
1	Massimiliano Lelli (ITA)	Ari-Ceramiche Ariostea	99h 42' 39"
2	Leonardo Sierra (VEN)	Selle Italia-Magniarredo-Vetta	+ 5' 00"
3	Gianluca Bortolami (ITA)	Colnago–Lampre	+ 27' 36"
4	Santos Hernández (ESP)	ONCE	+ 36' 53"
5	Stefano Della Santa (ITA)	Amore & Vita–Fanini	+ 55' 16"

=== Intergiro classification ===
Final intergiro classification (1–5)
	Rider	Team	Time
1	Alberto Leanizbarrutia (ESP)	CLAS–Cajastur	59h 34' 55"
2	Claudio Chiappucci (ITA)	Carrera Jeans–Tassoni	+ 9' 36"
3	Franco Chioccioli (ITA)	Del Tongo-MG Boys Maglificio	+ 9' 39"
4	Gianni Bugno (ITA)	Chateau d'Ax–Gatorade	+ 10' 10"
5	Marino Lejarreta (ESP)	ONCE	+ 11' 12"

=== Team classification ===
Final team classification (1–10)
	Team	Time
1	(Italy) Carrera Jeans–Tassoni	299h 49' 51"
2	(Spain) ONCE	+ 4' 40"
3	(Italy) Chateau d'Ax–Gatorade	+ 21' 40"
4	(Spain) Banesto	+ 35' 07"
5	(Spain) CLAS–Cajastur	+ 54' 57"
6	(France) Z	+ 57' 25"
7	(Italy) Del Tongo-MG Boys Maglificio	+ 1h 38' 21"
8	(Italy) Ari-Ceramiche Ariostea	+ 1h 41' 52"
9	(Spain) Lotus–Festina	+ 1h 52' 00"
10	(Colombia) Pony Malta-Avianca	+ 1h 59' 12"
