= 1990 Giro d'Italia =

Race details
- Dates: 18 May — 6 June 1990
- Stages: 20, including one split stage
- Distance: 3,450 km (2,144 mi)
- Winning time: 91h 51' 06"

Results
Jersey awarded to the overall winner	Winner	Gianni Bugno (ITA)	(Château d'Ax–Salotti)
	Second	Charly Mottet (FRA)	(RMO)
	Third	Marco Giovannetti (ITA)	(Seur)
Jersey awarded to the points classification winner	Points	Gianni Bugno (ITA)	(Château d'Ax–Salotti)
Jersey awarded to the mountains classification winner	Mountains	Claudio Chiappucci (ITA)	(Carrera Jeans–Vagabond)
Jersey awarded to the youth classification winner	Youth	Vladimir Poulnikov (URS)	(Alfa Lum)
	Sprints	Alessio Di Basco (ITA)	(Gis Gelati–Benotto)
Jersey awarded to the intergiro classification winner	Intergiro	Phil Anderson (AUS)	(TVM)
	Team	ONCE	

The 1990 Giro d'Italia was the 73rd edition of the race. It started off in Bari on 18 May with a 13 km (8.1 mi) individual time trial. The race came to a close with a mass-start stage that began and ended in Milan on 6 June. Twenty-two teams entered the race, which was won by the Italian Gianni Bugno of the Château d'Ax–Salotti team. Second and third respectively were the Frenchman Charly Mottet and the Italian rider, Marco Giovannetti. Bugno wore the pink jersey as leader in the general classification from the first to the last stage (before him, only Girardengo in 1919, Binda in 1927 and Merckx in 1973 achieved the same).

In addition to the general classification, Gianni Bugno also won the points classification. In the race's other classifications, Vladimir Poulnikov of the Alfa Lum–BFB Bruciatori team completed the Giro as the best neo-professional in the general classification, finishing in fourth place overall; Carrera Jeans–Vagabond rider Claudio Chiappucci won the mountains classification, and TVM rider Phil Anderson won the intergiro classification. ONCE finished as the winners of the Trofeo Fast Team classification, ranking each of the twenty-two teams contesting the race by lowest cumulative time.

== Teams ==
Twenty-two teams were invited by the race organizers to participate in the 1990 edition of the Giro d'Italia, ten of which were based outside of Italy. The starting riders came from a total of 20 different countries; Italy (89), Spain (24), France (20), Switzerland (12), and the Netherlands (11) all had more than 10 riders. Each team sent a squad of nine riders, which meant that the race started with a peloton of 198 cyclists. Of these, 92 were riding the Giro d'Italia for the first time. The average age of riders was 26.85 years, ranging from 21–year–old Florido Barale (Amore & Vita–Fanini) to 39–year–old Pierino Gavazzi (Amore & Vita–Fanini). The team with the youngest average rider age was Malvor–Sidi (24), while the oldest was Z–Tomasso (29).

The teams entering the race were:

- Alfa Lum
- Amore & Vita–Fanini
- Ariostea
- Carrera Jeans–Vagabond
- Castorama
- Chateau d'Ax–Salotti
- CLAS–Cajastur
- Del Tongo
- Diana–Colnago–Animex
- Frank–Monte Tamaro
- Gis Gelati–Benotto
- Italbonifica–Navigare
- Jolly Componibili–Club 88
- Malvor–Sidi
- ONCE
- Panasonic–Sportlife
- RMO
- Selle Italia–Eurocar
- Seur
- 7-Eleven
- TVM
- Z–Tomasso

== Pre-race favorites ==
Reigning champion Laurent Fignon (Castorama) returned to defend his title and was seen as a favorite to win despite a sub–par Classics season. Marco Giovannetti (Seur) who won the Vuelta a España a few weeks prior was seen as a contender. He was seen as one of the better Italian riders with a chance to win the overall, while it was noted that it would be difficult to win the Giro and Vuelta in the same season as only two riders – Eddy Merckx (1973) and Giovanni Battaglin (1981) – had accomplished that prior. Milan–San Remo winner Gianni Bugno (Chateau d'Ax–Salotti) entered the race and writers considered him a contender, others wrote him off as Classics rider. La Repubblica mentioned that he could be the new Francesco Moser. RMO's Charly Mottet due to his recent victory in the Tour de Romandie also received consideration as a favorite. For the 1990 season, Mottet altered his normal schedule to include the Giro d'Italia and not ride the Critérium du Dauphiné Libéré.

Other riders that received attention as contenders were Steven Rooks, Urs Zimmermann, and Gert-Jan Theunisse. Rooks and Theunisse were expected to make their presence known in the final week of racing. Spanish rider Marino Lejaretta (ONCE) was thought to be the best Spanish rider to make a run during the three weeks. Reigning world road race champion Greg LeMond (Z–Tomasso) entered the race in poor form and without and high placings. IT was reported that LeMond had been recovering from a viral illness two months prior. Polish rider Zenon Jaskuła (Diana–Colnago–Animex) was seen as a rider who had a chance to place high.

Twenty–seven year old Adriano Baffi (Ariostea) was thought to be the premier sprinter in the race. The strongest team in the race was thought to be Panasonic–Sportlife as they had won 26 races before the start of the Giro. Former winner Stephen Roche and Pedro Delgado chose not to participate in the Giro in favor of racing the Tour de France. Moreno Argentin and Maurizio Fondriest did not participate either. Mexican Raúl Alcalá (PDM–Concorde–Ultima) who recently won the Trump Tour chose to ride the Tour over the Giro.

== Route and stages ==
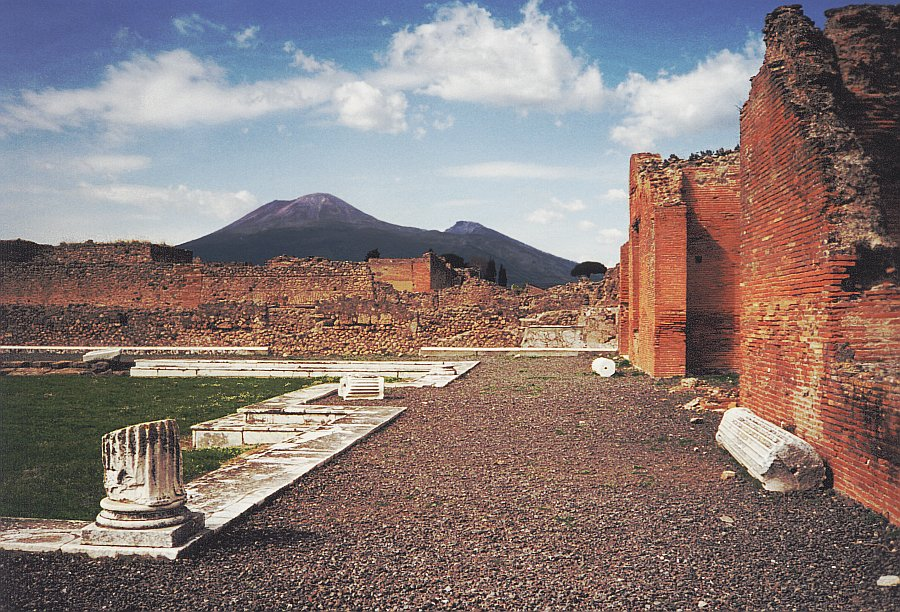
Mount Vesuvius hosted the end of the 190 km (118 mi) third stage that began in Sala Consilina.

The route for the 1990 edition of the Giro d'Italia was revealed to the public on television by head organizer Vincenzo Torriani on 16 December 1989 in Milan. In order to avoid overlap with the World Cup held in Italy, the race was moved forward a week and two stages were removed. It contained three time trial events, all of which were individual. There were eleven stages containing categorized climbs, of which four had summit finishes: stage 3, to Mount Vesuvius; stage 7, to Vallombrosa; stage 16, to Passo Pordoi; and stage 17, to Aprica. Another stage with a mountain-top finish was stage 19, which consisted of a climbing time trial to Sacro Monte di Varese. In total, there were 35 categorized climbs across 13 stages and made for 27.3 km (17 mi) of climbing, less than the previous year. The organizers chose to not include any rest days. When compared to the previous year's race, the race was 336 km 32 km (20 mi) longer, contained the same amount of rest days, and one less individual time trial. In addition, this race contained the same number of half stages, one, as the year before. The event traveled into the neighboring Austria when the race reached the Dolomites, specifically into Klagenfurt.

The route was found to be balanced with five summit finishes and three time trials, while the difficult parts had adequate rest in between. There were thought to be chances for puncheurs and traditional sprinters.

Stage characteristics and winners
Stage	Date	Course	Distance	Type	Winner
1	18 May	Bari to Bari	13 km (8 mi)	Individual time trial	Gianni Bugno (ITA)
2	19 May	Bari to Sala Consilina	239 km (149 mi)	Stage with mountain(s)	Giovanni Fidanza (ITA)
3	20 May	Sala Consilina to Mount Vesuvius	190 km (118 mi)	Stage with mountain(s)	Eduardo Chozas (ESP)
4a	21 May	Ercolano to Nola	31 km (19 mi)	Plain stage	Stefano Allocchio (ITA)
4b	21 May	Nola to Sora	164 km (102 mi)	Plain stage	Phil Anderson (AUS)
5	22 May	Sora to Teramo	233 km (145 mi)	Stage with mountain(s)	Fabrizio Convalle (ITA)
6	23 May	Teramo to Fabriano	200 km (124 mi)	Stage with mountain(s)	Luca Gelfi (ITA)
7	24 May	Fabriano to Vallombrosa	197 km (122 mi)	Stage with mountain(s)	Gianni Bugno (ITA)
8	25 May	Reggello to Marina di Pietrasanta	188 km (117 mi)	Plain stage	Stefano Allocchio (ITA)
9	26 May	La Spezia to Langhirano	176 km (109 mi)	Stage with mountain(s)	Vladimir Poulnikov (URS)
10	27 May	Grinzane Cavour to Cuneo	68 km (42 mi)	Individual time trial	Luca Gelfi (ITA)
11	28 May	Cuneo to Lodi	241 km (150 mi)	Plain stage	Adriano Baffi (ITA)
12	29 May	Brescia to Baselga di Pinè	193 km (120 mi)	Stage with mountain(s)	Éric Boyer (FRA)
13	30 May	Baselga di Pinè to Udine	224 km (139 mi)	Plain stage	Mario Cipollini (ITA)
14	31 May	Klagenfurt (Austria) to Klagenfurt (Austria)	164 km (102 mi)	Stage with mountain(s)	Allan Peiper (AUS)
15	1 June	Velden am Wörther See (Austria) to Dobbiaco	226 km (140 mi)	Stage with mountain(s)	Éric Boyer (FRA)
16	2 June	Dobbiaco to Passo Pordoi	171 km (106 mi)	Stage with mountain(s)	Charly Mottet (FRA)
17	3 June	Moena to Aprica	223 km (139 mi)	Stage with mountain(s)	Leonardo Sierra (VEN)
18	4 June	Aprica to Gallarate	180 km (112 mi)	Plain stage	Adriano Baffi (ITA)
19	5 June	Gallarate to Sacro Monte di Varese	39 km (24 mi)	Individual time trial	Gianni Bugno (ITA)
20	6 June	Milan to Milan	90 km (56 mi)	Plain stage	Mario Cipollini (ITA)
	Total		3,450 km (2,144 mi)		

== Classification Leadership ==
Five different jerseys were worn during the 1990 Giro d'Italia. The leader of the general classification – calculated by adding the stage finish times of each rider, and allowing time bonuses for the first three finishers on mass-start stages – wore a pink jersey. This classification is the most important of the race, and its winner is considered as the winner of the Giro.

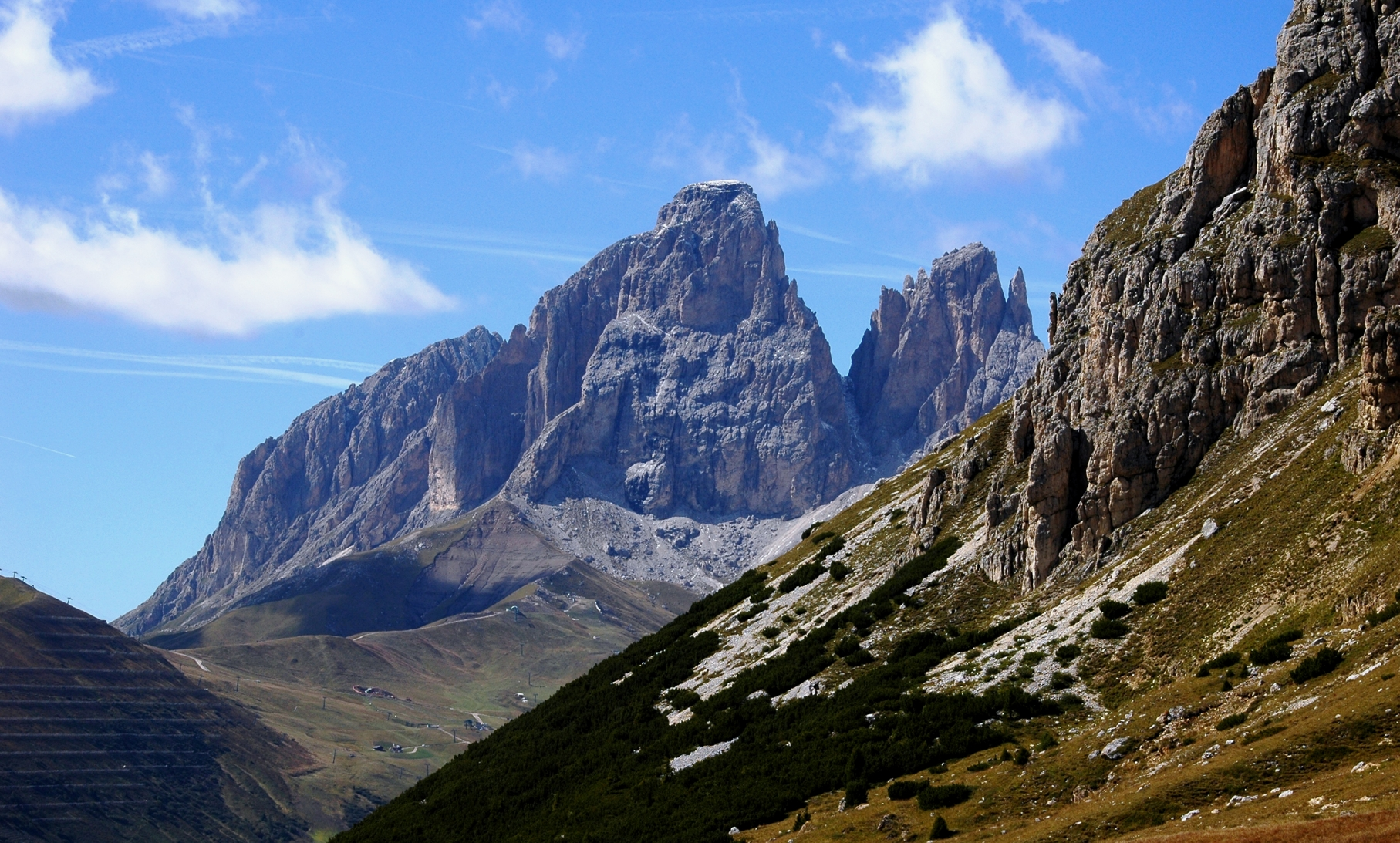
The Pordoi Pass was the Cima Coppi for the 1991 running of the Giro d'Italia.

For the points classification, which awarded a purple (or cyclamen) jersey to its leader, cyclists were given points for finishing a stage in the top 15; additional points could also be won in intermediate sprints. The green jersey was awarded to the mountains classification leader. In this ranking, points were won by reaching the summit of a climb ahead of other cyclists. Each climb was ranked as either first, second or third category, with more points available for higher category climbs. The Cima Coppi, the race's highest point of elevation, awarded more points than the other first category climbs. The Cima Coppi for this Giro was the Passo Pordoi. It was crossed twice by the riders, for the first climbing of the mountain, Italian Maurizio Vandelli was the first over the climb, while Charly Mottet was first over the second passing. The white jersey was worn by the leader of young rider classification, a ranking decided the same way as the general classification, but considering only neo-professional cyclists (in their first three years of professional racing).

The intergiro classification was marked by a blue jersey. The calculation for the intergiro is similar to that of the general classification, in each stage there is a midway point that the riders pass through a point and where their time is stopped. As the race goes on, their times compiled and the person with the lowest time is the leader of the intergiro classification and wears the blue jersey. Although no jersey was awarded, there was also one classification for the teams, in which the stage finish times of the best three cyclists per team were added; the leading team was the one with the lowest total time.

The rows in the following table correspond to the jerseys awarded after that stage was run.

Classification leadership by stage
Stage	Winner	General classification	Points classification	Mountains classification	Young rider classification	Team classification
1	Gianni Bugno	Gianni Bugno	Gianni Bugno	not awarded	Joachim Halupczok	Diana–Colnago–Animex
2	Giovanni Fidanza	Gianni Bugno	Giovanni Fidanza	Claudio Chiappucci	Joachim Halupczok	Castorama
3	Eduardo Chozas	Gianni Bugno	Gianni Bugno	Eduardo Chozas	Daniel Steiger	Castorama
4a	Stefano Allocchio	Gianni Bugno	Giovanni Fidanza	Eduardo Chozas	Daniel Steiger	Castorama
4b	Phil Anderson	Gianni Bugno	Giovanni Fidanza	Eduardo Chozas	Daniel Steiger	Castorama
5	Fabrizio Convalle	Gianni Bugno	Giovanni Fidanza	Claudio Chiappucci & Eduardo Chozas	Daniel Steiger	Carrera Jeans–Vagabond
6	Luca Gelfi	Gianni Bugno	Giovanni Fidanza	Phil Anderson	Daniel Steiger	Carrera Jeans–Vagabond
7	Gianni Bugno	Gianni Bugno	Gianni Bugno	Claudio Chiappucci	Daniel Steiger	Carrera Jeans–Vagabond
8	Stefano Allocchio	Gianni Bugno	Giovanni Fidanza	Claudio Chiappucci	Daniel Steiger	Carrera Jeans–Vagabond
9	Vladimir Poulnikov	Gianni Bugno	Giovanni Fidanza	Claudio Chiappucci	Joachim Halupczok	Carrera Jeans–Vagabond
10	Luca Gelfi	Gianni Bugno	Gianni Bugno	Claudio Chiappucci	Joachim Halupczok	Diana–Colnago–Animex
11	Adriano Baffi	Gianni Bugno	Phil Anderson	Claudio Chiappucci	Joachim Halupczok	Diana–Colnago–Animex
12	Éric Boyer	Gianni Bugno	Phil Anderson	Claudio Chiappucci	Joachim Halupczok	Carrera Jeans–Vagabond
13	Mario Cipollini	Gianni Bugno	Phil Anderson	Claudio Chiappucci	Joachim Halupczok	Carrera Jeans–Vagabond
14	Allan Peiper	Gianni Bugno	Phil Anderson	Claudio Chiappucci	Joachim Halupczok	Carrera Jeans–Vagabond
15	Éric Boyer	Gianni Bugno	Phil Anderson	Claudio Chiappucci	Joachim Halupczok	Carrera Jeans–Vagabond
16	Charly Mottet	Gianni Bugno	Phil Anderson	Claudio Chiappucci	Vladimir Poulnikov	ONCE
17	Leonardo Sierra	Gianni Bugno	Gianni Bugno	Claudio Chiappucci	Vladimir Poulnikov	ONCE
18	Adriano Baffi	Gianni Bugno	Phil Anderson	Claudio Chiappucci	Vladimir Poulnikov	ONCE
19	Gianni Bugno	Gianni Bugno	Gianni Bugno	Claudio Chiappucci	Vladimir Poulnikov	ONCE
20	Mario Cipollini	Gianni Bugno	Gianni Bugno	Claudio Chiappucci	Vladimir Poulnikov	ONCE
Final		Gianni Bugno	Gianni Bugno	Claudio Chiappucci	Vladimir Poulnikov	ONCE

== Final standings ==
Legend
A pink jersey	Denotes the winner of the General classification	A green jersey	Denotes the winner of the Mountains classification
A purple jersey	Denotes the winner of the Points classification	A white jersey	Denotes the winner of the Young rider classification
A blue jersey	Denotes the winner of the Intergiro classification		

=== General classification ===
Final general classification (1–10)
Rank	Name	Team	Time
1	Gianni Bugno (ITA)	Château d'Ax–Salotti	91h 51' 04"
2	Charly Mottet (FRA)	RMO	+ 6' 33"
3	Marco Giovannetti (ITA)	Seur	+ 9' 01"
4	Vladimir Poulnikov (URS)	Alfa Lum–BFB Bruciatori	+ 12' 19"
5	Federico Echave (ESP)	CLAS–Cajastur	+ 12' 25"
6	Franco Chioccioli (ITA)	Del Tongo–Rex	+ 12' 36"
7	Marino Lejarreta (ESP)	ONCE	+ 14' 31"
8	Piotr Ugrumov (URS)	Alfa Lum–BFB Bruciatori	+ 17' 02"
9	Massimiliano Lelli (ITA)	Ariostea	+ 17' 14"
10	Leonardo Sierra (VEN)	Selle Italia–Eurocar	+ 19' 12"

=== Points classification ===
Final points classification (1-5)
	Rider	Team	Points
1	Gianni Bugno (ITA)	Château d'Ax–Salotti	195
2	Phil Anderson (AUS)	TVM	176
2	Mario Cipollini (ITA)	Del Tongo–Rex	176
4	Giovanni Fidanza (ITA)	Château d'Ax–Salotti	167
5	Adriano Baffi (ITA)	Ariostea	118

=== Mountains classification ===
Final mountains classification (1-5)
	Rider	Team	Points
1	Claudio Chiappucci (ITA)	Carrera Jeans–Vagabond	74
2	Maurizio Vandelli (ITA)	Gis Gelati–Benotto	56
3	Gianni Bugno (ITA)	Château d'Ax–Salotti	48
4	Eduardo Chozas (ESP)	ONCE	47
5	Phil Anderson (AUS)	TVM	34

=== Young rider classification ===
Final young rider classification (1-5)
	Rider	Team	Time
1	Vladimir Poulnikov (URS)	Alfa Lum–BFB Bruciatori	92h 03' 27"
2	Piotr Ugrumov (URS)	Alfa Lum–BFB Bruciatori	+ 4' 43"
3	Massimiliano Lelli (ITA)	Ariostea	+ 4' 55"
4	Leonardo Sierra (VEN)	Selle Italia–Eurocar	+ 6' 53"
5	Enrico Zaina (ITA)	Carrera Jeans–Vagabond	+ 18' 10"

=== Intergiro classification ===
Final intergiro classification (1-5)
	Rider	Team	Time
1	Phil Anderson (AUS)	TVM	47h 56' 08"
2	Massimo Ghirotto (ITA)	Carrera Jeans–Vagabond	+ 39"
3	Luca Gelfi (ITA)	Del Tongo–Rex	+ 3' 33"
4	Werner Stutz (SUI)	Frank	+ 4' 22"
5	Gianni Bugno (ITA)	Château d'Ax–Salotti	+ 5' 08"

=== Combativity classification ===
Final combativity classification (1-5)
	Rider	Team	Points
1	Stefano Giuliani (ITA)	Jolly Componibili–Club 88	75
2	Maarten Ducrot (NED)	TVM	39
3	Massimo Podenzana (ITA)	Italbonifica–Navigare	32
4	Gianni Bugno (ITA)	Château d'Ax–Salotti	26
5	Masatoshi Ichikawa (JPN)	Frank-Monte Tamaro	26

=== Intermediate sprints classification ===
Final intermediate sprints classification (1–5)
	Rider	Team	Points
1	Alessio Di Basco (ITA)	Gis Gelati–Benotto	39
2	Danilo Gioia (ITA)	Gis Gelati–Benotto	31
3	Stefano Giuliani (ITA)	Jolly Componibili–Club 88	25
4	Marcel Wüst (FRG)	RMO	18
5	Gianni Bugno (ITA)	Château d'Ax–Salotti	15

=== Traguardo Italia '90 classification ===
Final traguardo Italia '90 classification (1-5)
	Rider	Team	Points
1	Fabrizio Convalle (ITA)	Amore & Vita–Fanini	18
2	Roberto Pelliconi (ITA)	Amore & Vita–Fanini	10
3	Marco Lietti (ITA)	Ariostea	8
4	Roberto Pagnin (ITA)	Malvor–Sidi	7
5	Claudio Chiappucci (ITA)	Carrera Jeans–Vagabond	5

=== Traguardi Fiat Uno classification ===
Final traguardi Fiat Uno classification (1-5)
	Rider	Team	Points
1	Gianni Bugno (ITA)	Château d'Ax–Salotti	18
2	Stefano Giuliani (ITA)	Jolly Componibili–Club 88	18
3	Phil Anderson (AUS)	TVM	10
4	Éric Boyer (FRA)	Z–Tomasso	8
5	Eduardo Chozas (ESP)	ONCE	8

=== Team classification ===
Final team classification (1-5)
	Team	Time
1	ONCE	276h 33' 04"
2	Carrera Jeans–Vagabond	+ 3' 57"
3	Del Tongo–Rex	+ 7' 39"
4	Alfa Lum–BFB Bruciatori	+ 16' 48"
5	Ariostea	+ 28' 54"
