= 1994 Tour de Suisse =

Race details
- Dates: 14–23 June 1994
- Stages: 9 + Prologue
- Distance: 1,606 km (997.9 mi)
- Winning time: 41h 32' 28"

Results
	Winner	Pascal Richard (SUI)	(GB–MG Maglificio)
	Second	Vladimir Poulnikov (RUS)	(Carrera Jeans–Tassoni)
	Third	Gianluca Pierobon (ITA)	(Amore & Vita–Galatron)

The 1994 Tour de Suisse was the 58th edition of the Tour de Suisse cycle race and was held from 14 June to 23 June 1994. The race started in Yverdon-les-Bains and finished in Zürich. The race was won by Pascal Richard of the GB–MG Maglificio team.

== General classification ==
Final general classification

Rank	Rider	Team	Time
1	Pascal Richard (SUI)	GB–MG Maglificio	41h 32' 28"
2	Vladimir Poulnikov (RUS)	Carrera Jeans–Tassoni	+ 1' 02"
3	Gianluca Pierobon (ITA)	Amore & Vita–Galatron	+ 1' 04"
4	Heinz Imboden (SUI)	Brescialat–Ceramiche Refin	+ 1' 26"
5	Rodolfo Massi (ITA)	Amore & Vita–Galatron	+ 2' 23"
6	Marco Saligari (ITA)	GB–MG Maglificio	+ 4' 04"
7	Lance Armstrong (USA)	Motorola	+ 4' 18"
8	Flavio Giupponi (ITA)	Brescialat–Ceramiche Refin	+ 4' 33"
9	Mauro Gianetti (SUI)	Mapei–CLAS	+ 4' 41"
10	Felice Puttini (SUI)	Brescialat–Ceramiche Refin	+ 5' 56"
