= Fabrizio Convalle =

Italian cyclist

Personal information
- Born: 11 April 1965 (age 61) Carrara, Italy

Cycling career
- Sport: Cycling
- Current team: Retired
- Discipline: Road
- Role: Rider

Professional team
- 1989–1992: Polli–Mobiexport

Fabrizio Convalle (born 11 April 1965 in Carrara) is an Italian former cyclist.

== Major results ==
1989
3rd Overall Giro di Puglia
1990
1st Stage 5 Giro d'Italia
