= Alberto Leanizbarrutia =

Spanish cyclist

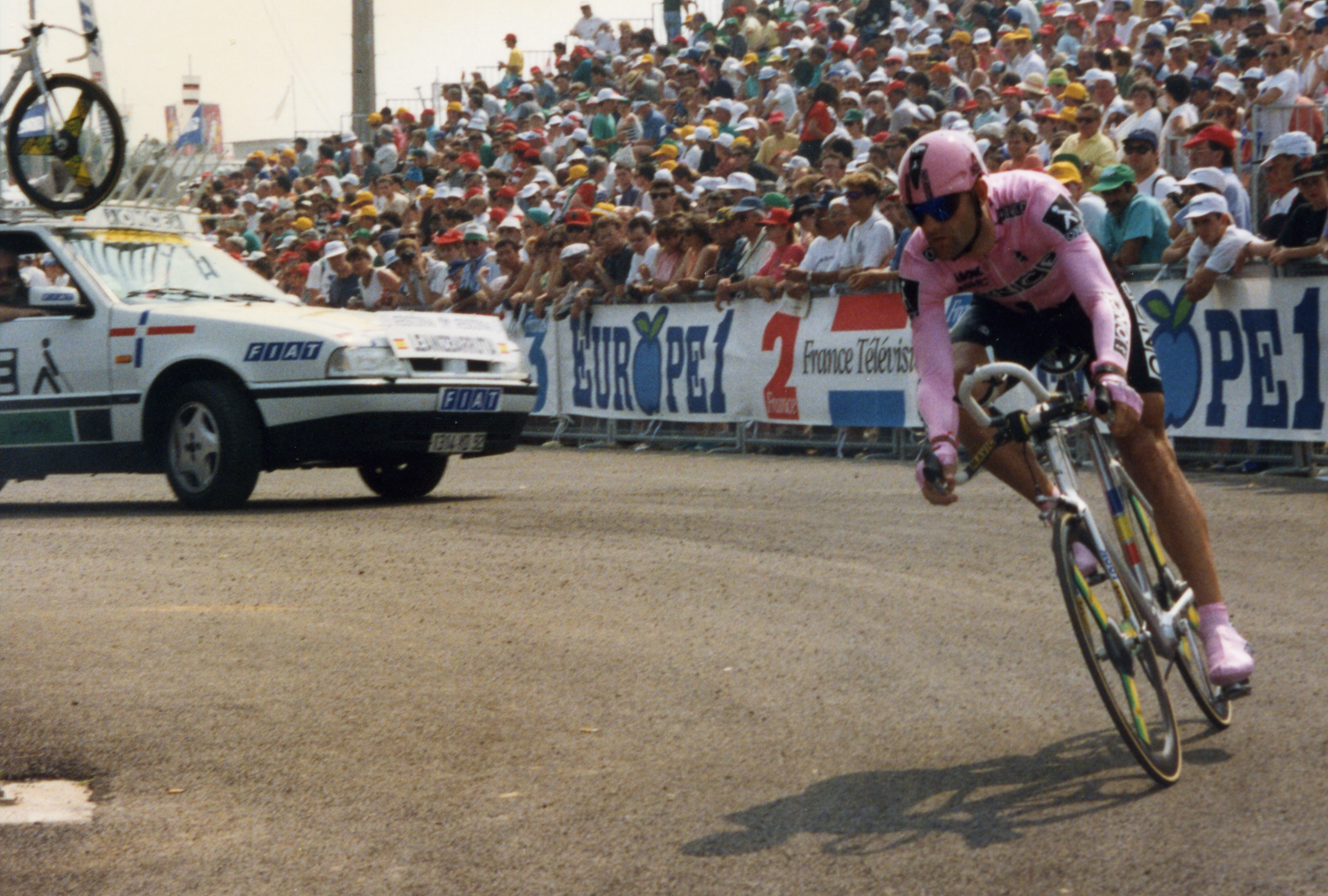

Personal information
- Born: 1 April 1963 (age 63) Elorrio, Spain

Cycling career
- Sport: Cycling
- Current team: Retired
- Discipline: Road
- Role: Rider

Professional teams
- 1985: Hueso Chocolates
- 1986: Zahor Chocolates
- 1987-1990: Teka
- 1991-1992: CLAS-Cajastur
- 1993-1998: ONCE

Managerial team
- 2005-2006: Liberty Seguros

Alberto Leanizbarrutia (born 1 April 1963 in Elorrio) is a former Spanish cyclist. He notably participated in 17 Grand Tours and is one of only 35 Riders in the entire history of cycling to have completed the Vuelta a Espana, Giro d'Italia and Tour de France in the same season, which he accomplished in 1991. In the 1991 Giro he won the Intergiro classification.

== Major results ==
1986
3rd Trofeo Luis Puig
1987
1st stage 5 Tour of the Basque Country
3rd Circuito de Getxo
1988
1st Tour de Vendée
1990
1st Prologue Vuelta a Cantabria
2nd Troféu Joaquim Agostinho
1991
Intergiro classification Giro d'Italia
1993
3rd Clásica de Alcobendas
1994
2nd Clásica de Alcobendas
