= AIGCP =

Association of professional road cycling teams

AIGCP (Association International des Groupes Cyclistes Professionels, International Association of Professional Cycling Teams) is an association that groups together many professional cycling teams.

Based in Lannion, France, its managing director is Luuc Eisenga, and the president is Team Jayco–AlUla manager Brent Copeland, who was elected in 2024.
