= Éric Boyer =

French cyclist (born 1963)

Eric Boyer
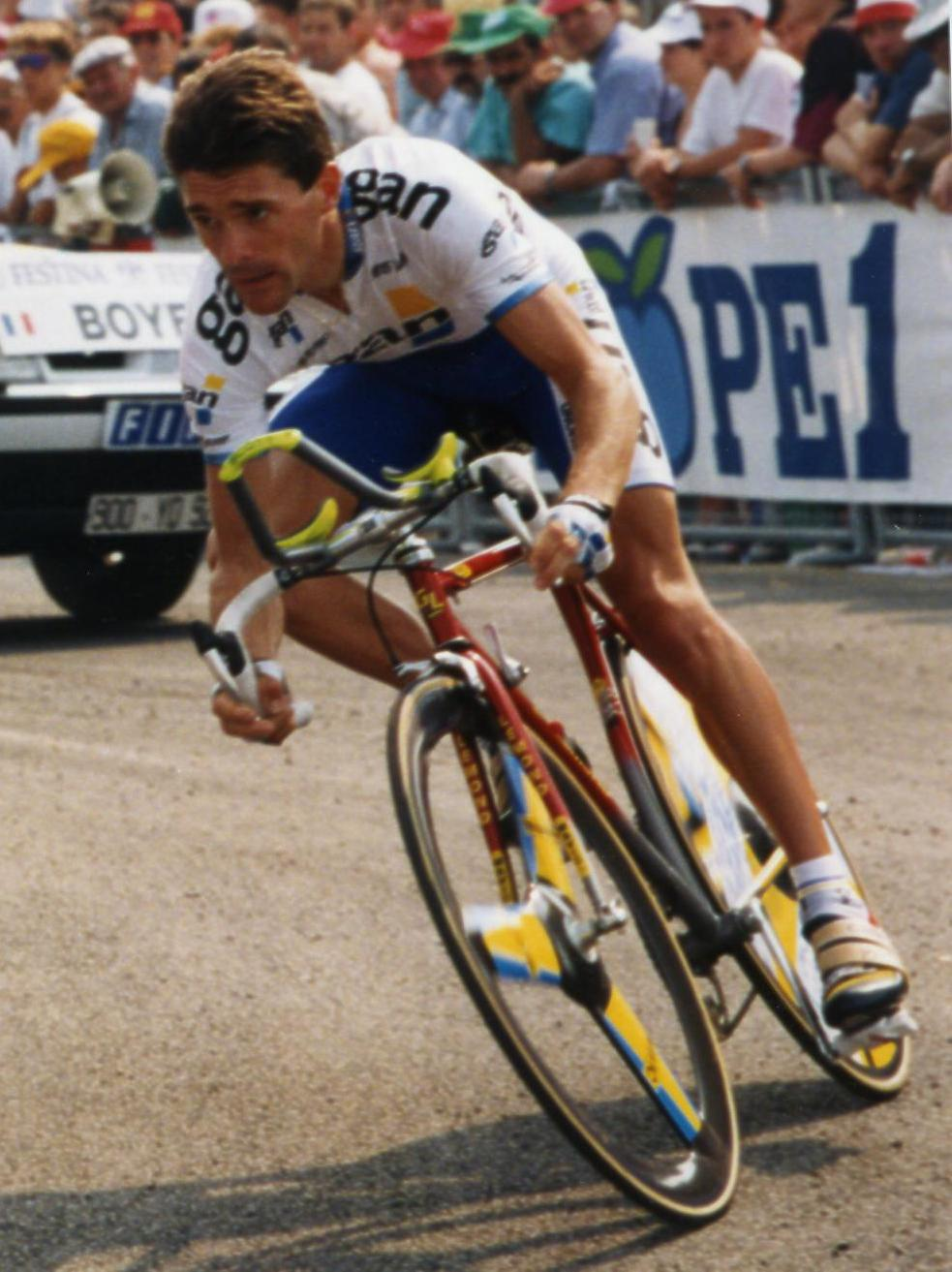
- Boyer at the 1993 Tour de France

Personal information
- Full name: Éric Boyer
- Born: 2 December 1963 (age 62) Choisy-le-Roi, France

Cycling career
- Sport: Cycling
- Discipline: Road
- Role: Rider; Manager

Professional teams
- 1985: Renault–Elf
- 1986–1988: Système U
- 1989–1994: Z–Peugeot
- 1995: Polti–Granarolo–Santini

Managerial team
- 2005–2012: Cofidis

Major wins
- Grand Tours Tour de France 1 TTT stage (1986) Giro d'Italia 3 individual stages (1990, 1991)

Éric Boyer (born 2 December 1963) is a French former professional road bicycle racer.

Boyer was born in Choisy-le-Roi. In the 1988 Tour de France, he finished in 5th place in the overall classification - the highest placed French finisher. Boyer won two stages of the 1990 Giro d'Italia and one stage the following year.

After his racing career, Boyer worked for television (including Eurosport and L'Equipe) and newspapers. He was manager of the Cofidis team from 2005 until June 2012. In addition he briefly served as president of the AIGCP from 2008 to 2009.

== Major results ==
1981
3rd Road race, National Junior Road Championships
1984
1st Stage 2 Ruban Granitier Breton
3rd Overall Tour du Limousin
1985
5th Overall Tour Midi-Pyrénées
1986
1st Grand Prix de Rennes
1st Grand Prix d'Antibes
1st Stage 2 (TTT) Tour de France
4th Overall Étoile de Bessèges
1987
1st Stage 2 Grand Prix du Midi Libre
2nd Overall Tour Midi-Pyrénées
4th Giro di Lombardia
5th Overall Paris–Nice
6th Overall Tour de la Communauté Européenne

1st Prologue (TTT) & Stage 9

10th Overall Tour of Ireland

1st Stage 4a (TTT)

10th Overall Tour du Haut Var
1988
4th Amstel Gold Race
5th Overall Tour de France
1989
2nd Overall Grand Prix du Midi Libre
2nd Overall Route du Sud
1990
1st Stages 2 & 15 Giro d'Italia
2nd Polynormande
5th Overall Paris–Nice
1991
6th Overall Giro d'Italia

1st Stage 4

1992
1st Overall Tour du Limousin

1st Stage 1

8th Overall Tour de Suisse

1st Stage 9

1993
1st Overall Route du Sud

1st Stage 2

3rd Overall Critérium du Dauphiné Libéré

=== Grand Tour general classification results timeline ===
Grand Tour	1986	1987	1988	1989	1990	1991	1992	1993	1994	1995
Vuelta a España	40	—	—	—	—	—	—	—	—	—
Giro d'Italia	—	—	—	—	23	6	—	—	—	69
Tour de France	98	—	5	DNF	19	38	12	63	—	DNF

Legend
—	Did not compete
DNF	Did not finish
