= Massimiliano Lelli =

Italian cyclist

Personal information
- Full name: Massimiliano Lelli
- Born: 2 December 1967 (age 58) Manciano, Italy
- Height: 1.75 m (5 ft 9 in)
- Weight: 66 kg (146 lb; 10 st 6 lb)

Cycling career
- Sport: Cycling
- Discipline: Road
- Role: Rider

Professional teams
- 1989: Atala
- 1990–1993: Ariostea
- 1994–1995: Mercatone Uno
- 1996–1997: Saeco
- 1999–2004: Cofidis

Major wins
- Grand Tours Giro d'Italia Young rider Classification (1991) 2 individual stages (1991) One-day races and Classics National Time Trial Championships (1995)

Massimiliano Lelli (born 2 December 1967) is a former Italian professional cyclist. He most known for winning the Young rider Classification in the 1991 Giro d'Italia. His highest finishing in the Giro d'Italia was the year he won the Young rider classification, with a third place. He retired from cycling in 2004.

== Major results ==
1989
4th Giro di Toscana
5th Overall Giro del Trentino
1990
1st Stage 4 Tirreno–Adriatico
3rd Coppa Bernocchi
9th Overall Giro d'Italia
10th GP Industria & Artigianato di Larciano
1991
1st Giro di Toscana
2nd Overall Giro del Trentino
3rd Overall Giro d'Italia

1st Young rider classification
1st Stages 12 & 16

3rd Giro dell'Umbria
5th Coppa Bernocchi
1992
1st Stage 4 Giro di Puglia
6th Overall Critérium International
7th Overall Tour de Romandie
9th Giro di Toscana
1993
1st Giro di Toscana
4th Overall Giro d'Italia
5th Overall Settimana Internazionale di Coppi e Bartali
9th Road race, National Road Championships
9th Trofeo Melinda
1994
6th Firenze–Pistoia
1995
1st Time trial, National Road Championships
7th Overall Tirreno–Adriatico
1996
1st Overall Volta a Portugal

1st Points classification
1st Stages 2, 4, 5 (ITT), 9, 12 & 14 (ITT)

5th Tre Valli Varesine
6th Gran Premio Industria e Commercio di Prato
7th Coppa Bernocchi
1997
1st US Pro Championship
1999
5th Breitling Grand Prix (with Roland Meier)
2000
4th Overall Critérium International
4th EnBW Grand Prix (with David Millar)
5th Overall Circuit de la Sarthe
10th Overall Volta a la Comunitat Valenciana
2003
1st Overall Tour du Limousin

=== Grand Tour general classification results timeline ===
Grand Tour	1990	1991	1992	1993	1994	1995	1996	1997	1998	1999	2000	2001	2002	2003
Giro d'Italia	9	3	12	4	DNF	DNF	—	—	—	—	—	—	—	—
Tour de France	—	DNF	DNF	—	—	43	25	47	36	34	27	67	14	15
/ Vuelta a España	—	—	—	—	23	—	DNF	—	—	49	—	44	DNF	—

Legend
—	Did not compete
DNF	Did not finish
