= Gianluca Pierobon =

Italian cyclist (1967–2026)

Personal information
- Born: 2 March 1967 Gallarate, Italy
- Died: 5 November 2026 (aged 59)
- Height: 1.75 m (5 ft 9 in)
- Weight: 69 kg (152 lb; 10 st 12 lb)

Cycling career
- Sport: Cycling
- Discipline: Road
- Role: Rider

Professional teams
- 1989: Atala-Campagnolo
- 1990: Malvor
- 1991–1992: ZG Mobili
- 1993: Mecair–Ballan
- 1994: Amore & Vita–Galatron
- 1995–1996: Refin
- 1997: Batik-Del Monte
- 1998: Kross–Selle Italia

Gianluca Pierobon (2 March 1967 – 5 November 2026) was an Italian racing cyclist. He died on 5 November 2026 following a long illness, at the age of 59.

== Career ==
Pieron's first professional victory was stage 2b of the 1991 Giro d'Italia, a short 7km time trial. In 1993 at the Philadelphia Cycling Classic he finsihed second to Lance Armstrong. At the 1994 Tour de Suisse he won the prologue and held the leaders jersey for 2 days before relinquishing it to Pascal Richard, the eventual winner.

== Major results ==
1985
1st Junior National Road Race Championships
1st Trofeo Buffoni
1989
9th Coppa Sabatini
9th Firenze–Pistoia
1990
1st Criterium d'Abruzzo
2nd Overall Giro di Calabria
7th Millemetri del Corso di Mestre
9th Giro di Campania
1991 (1 Pro win)
1st Stage 2b Giro d'Italia
6th Firenze–Pistoia
1992
1st Prologue G.P. Internacional del Café
9th Overall Tirreno–Adriatico
1993
2nd Philadelphia Cycling Classic
6th Rund um Köln
1994 (2)
1st Stage 4 Vuelta a Aragón
3rd Overall Tour de Suisse

1st Prologue

1995 (1)
1st Stage 5 Tirreno–Adriatico
1st Stage 16 Vuelta Mexico Telmex
9th Josef Vögeli Memorial
1996
7th Gran Premio Bruno Beghelli
9th Firenze–Pistoia
