= Philippe Casado =

French cyclist

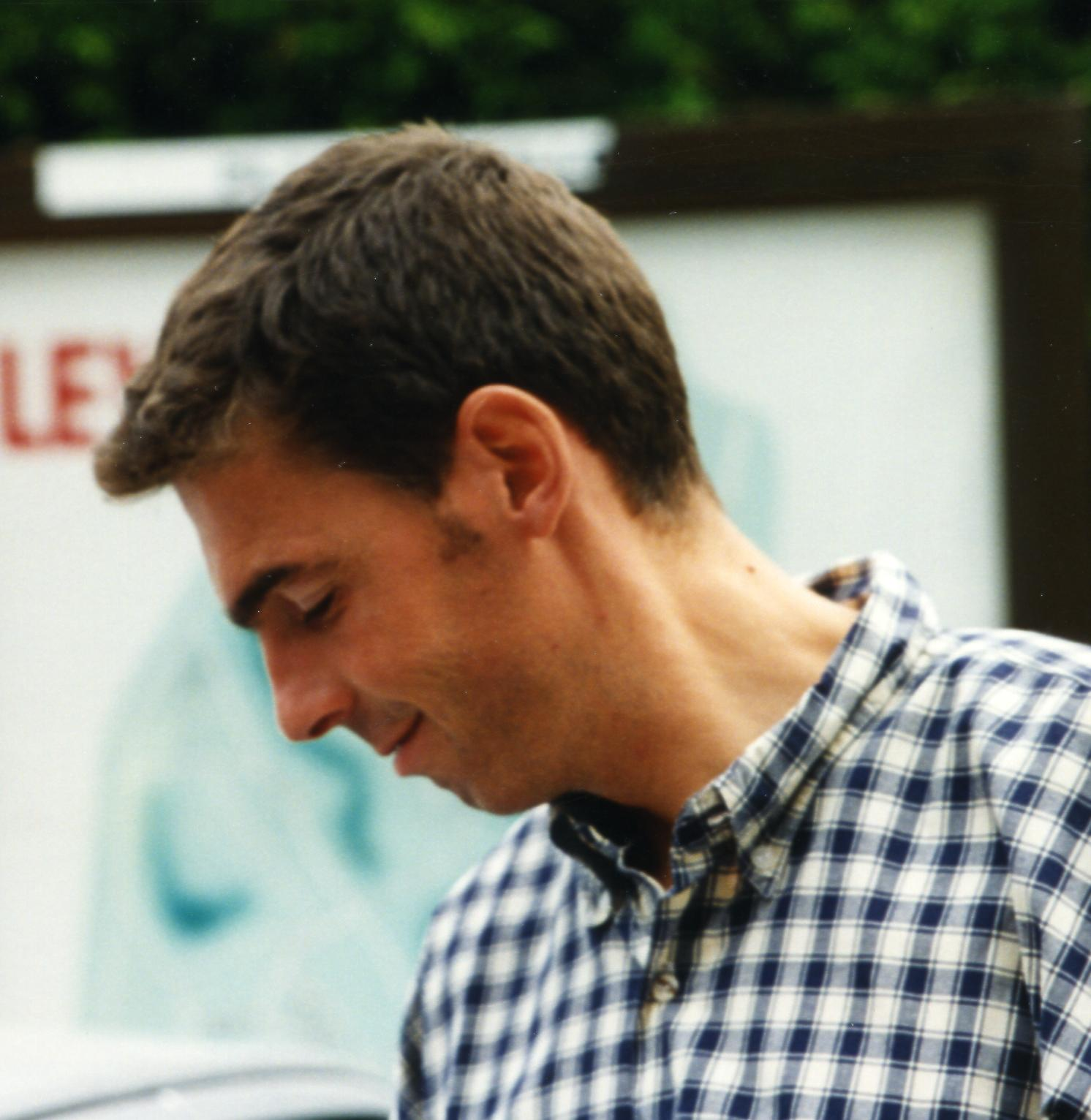

Personal information
- Full name: Philippe Casado
- Born: 1 February 1964 Oujda, Morocco
- Died: 21 January 1995 (aged 30) Saint-Estève, France

Cycling career
- Sport: Cycling
- Discipline: Road
- Role: Rider

Professional teams
- 1986: Peugeot
- 1987–1992: Z
- 1993: Gan
- 1994: Jolly Componibili

Philippe Casado (1 February 1964–21 January 1995) was a French professional road bicycle racer. Born in Oujda, Morocco, he was professional from 1986 until his death in 1995 and had 3 victories. He died in Saint-Estève.

== Major results ==
1986

- 2nd of the 2nd stage of the Tour du Limousin.
- 3rd of the 1st stage of the Milk Race.

1987

- 1st of the 2nd stage of the Étoile de Bessèges and a 3rd place in the prologue.
- 3rd of the 5th stage of Kellogg's Tour of Britain and the 2nd stage of the Milk Race.

1988

- 1st of the 1st stage of the Milk Race and with a 3rd in the 12th stage.
- 2nd Awards Quillan and Le Havre.

1989

- 2nd Criterium Aix-en-Provence.

1990

- 2nd Tour de Vendée and the Prix d'Alès.
- 3rd of the 5th stage sector of the Étoile de Bessèges.

1991

- 1st in the 1st stage and maglia rosa (English: pink jersey) at the Giro d'Italia
- 1st Prize Quillan.
- 2nd of the 4th stage sector of the Tour de Romandie.
- 3rd in the Prix d'Alès.

1992

- 2nd in the Grand Prix de Denain.
- 3rd Prix Barentin

1993

- 3rd in the Prix de Dijon.

He also participated in the Tour de France for four years, finishing 129th in 1988. 93rd in 1989, 87th in 1991, and 123rd in 1993.

== Posthumous doping accusations ==
In 2007, at a forum on the legal issues of testing for performance-enhancing drugs, Greg LeMond told a story about a former teammate who had left his team at the time, Gan, in favor of an Italian team that would provide access to doping products. Although LeMond did not mention Casado by name, the events describe Casado perfectly. LeMond suggested that Casado's death was the reason he retired from cycling.
