= Leonardo Sierra =

Venezuelan cyclist

Personal information
- Full name: Leonardo Sierra Sepúlveda
- Born: 10 October 1968 (age 58) Mérida, Venezuela

Cycling career
- Sport: Cycling
- Current team: Retired
- Discipline: Road
- Role: Rider

Professional teams
- 1989: Eurocar–Mosoca–Galli
- 1990–1991: Selle Italia–Eurocar–Mosoca–Galli
- 1992–1993: ZG Mobili–Selle Italia
- 1994–1995: Carrera Jeans–Tassoni

Major wins
- Giro d'Italia, 1 stage

Leonardo Sierra Sepúlveda (born 10 October 1968) is a Venezuelan former road bicycle racer. He competed in the road race at the 1988 Summer Olympics.

== Career achievements ==
=== Major results ===
1988
1st Stage 4 Vuelta al Táchira
1989
6th Overall Tour de Luxembourg
1990
1st Giro del Friuli
1st Stage 4 Giro di Puglia
3rd GP Industria & Artigianato
3rd Overall Giro del Trentino
7th Giro di Lombardia
10th Overall Giro d'Italia

1st Stage 17

1991
1st Road race, National Road Championships
1st Overall Giro del Trentino

1st Stage 3

1st Stages 4, 7, 9 & 11 Vuelta al Táchira
2nd Giro di Toscana
7th Overall Giro d'Italia
1992
1st Road race, National Road Championships
1st Gran Premio Industria e Commercio di Prato
2nd Giro dell'Appennino
2nd Giro di Toscana
6th Overall Giro del Trentino
1993
1st Road race, National Road Championships
1st Overall Vuelta al Táchira

1st Stages 2, 4, 5 and 7

1st Prologue GP Cafe de Colombia
2nd Giro di Toscana
2nd Giro di Campania
3rd Trofeo Laigueglia
3rd Overall Giro del Trentino

=== Grand Tour general classification results timeline ===
Grand Tour	1990	1991	1992	1993	1994	1995
Giro d'Italia	10	7	DNF	39	63	—
Tour de France	—	—	—	34	—	50
Vuelta a España	—	—	—	—	—	DNF

Legend
DSQ	Disqualified
DNF	Did not finish
