= Aprica =

Aprica Abriga
- Comune
- Comune di Aprica
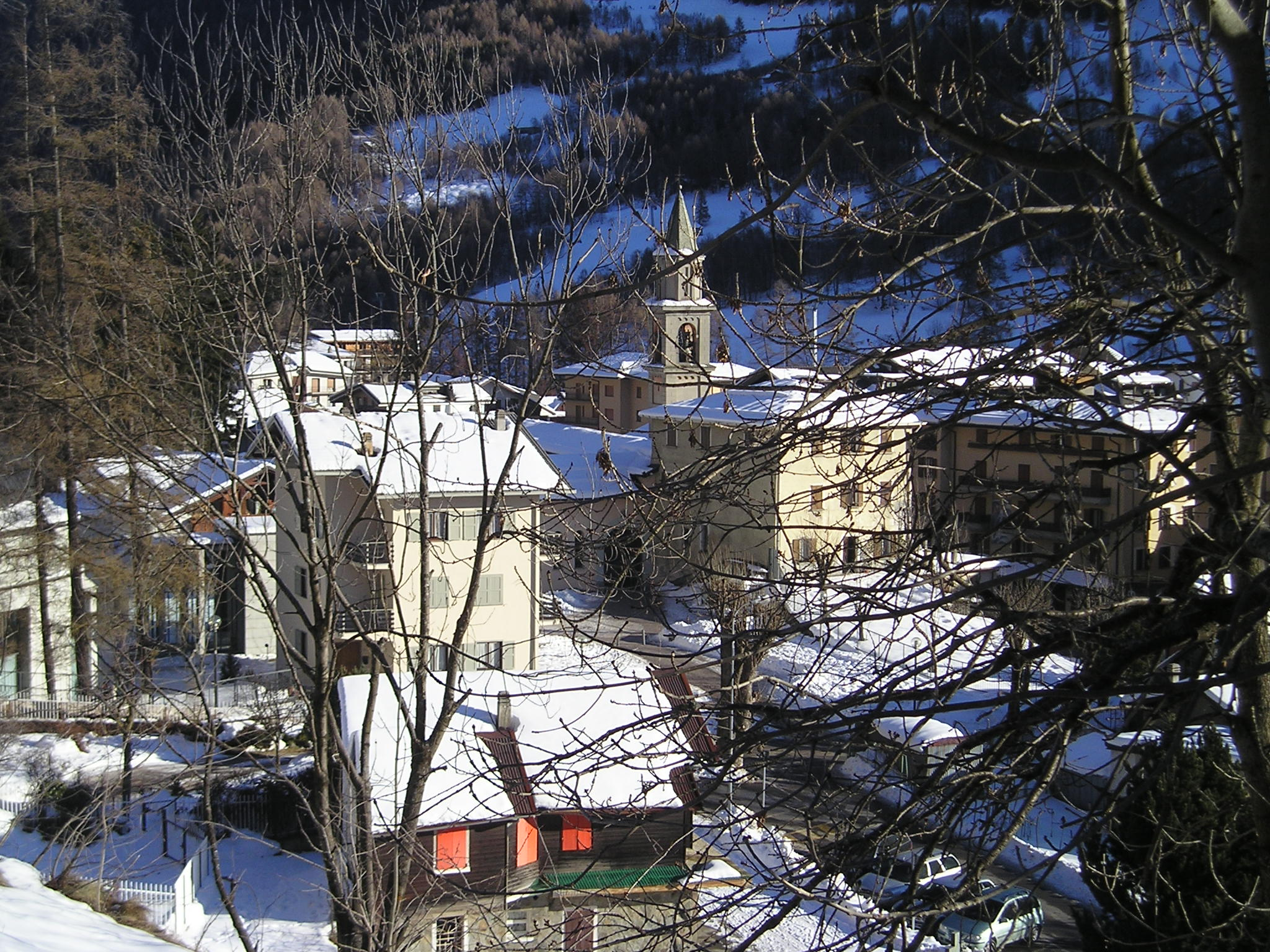
- View of Aprica

- Location within Italy Location within Lombardy
- Coordinates: 46°09′N 10°08′E
- Country: Italy
- Region: Lombardy
- Province: Sondrio (SO)

Government
  - Mayor: Dario Corvi

Area
  - Total: 20 km^{2} (7.7 sq mi)
- Elevation: 1,180 m (3,870 ft)

Population (2018-01-01)
  - Total: 1,583
  - Density: 79/km^{2} (200/sq mi)
- Time zone: UTC+1 (CET)
  - Summer (DST): UTC+2 (CEST)
- Postal code: 23031
- Dialing code: 0342
- Website: Official website

Aprica (Lombard: Abriga) is a town and comune in the province of Sondrio, Lombardy, northern Italy. It is located on the eponymous pass, the most favourable one connecting Valtellina to Val Camonica.

Its main source of income is tourism, using the areas geography to offer skiing (winter) and mountain biking (summer) opportunities.

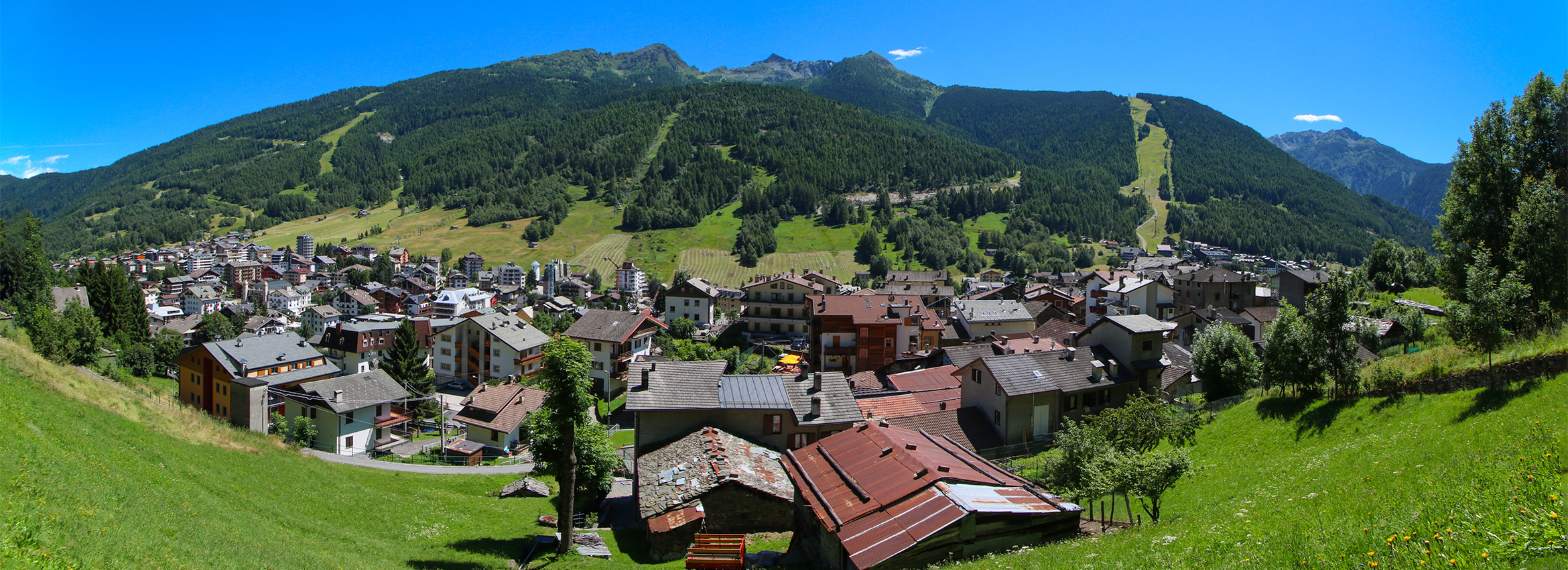
the town

== Twin towns ==
- Borgo Val di Taro, Italy
- Legnano, Italy
