= Massimo Ghirotto =

Italian cyclist

Personal information
- Full name: Massimo Ghirotto
- Born: 25 June 1961 (age 65) Boara Pisani, Italy

Cycling career
- Sport: Cycling
- Discipline: Road
- Role: Rider

Professional teams
- 1983: Gis Gelati
- 1984: Gis-Tuc Lu
- 1985–1986: Carrera-Inoxpran
- 1987–1990: Carrera Jeans-Vagabond
- 1991: Carrera Jeans-Tassoni
- 1992: Carrera Jeans-Vagabond
- 1993–1995: ZG Mobili

Major wins
- Wincanton Classic (1992); Giro d'Italia, 3 stages Tour de France, 2 stages Vuelta a España, 1 stage

Massimo Ghirotto (born 25 June 1961, in Boara Pisani) is an Italian former road bicycle racer.

== Major results ==
1982
1st Coppa Città di San Daniele
1987
1st, Trofeo Baracchi
1st, Trofeo Matteotti
1st, Coppa Placci
1st, Stage 10, Tour de Suisse
1988
1st, GP Industria & Artigianato di Larciano
1st, Stage 13, Tour de France
1989
1st, Stage 6, Vuelta a España
1990
1st, Giro dell'Umbria
1st, Stage 9, Tour de France
1991
1st, Stage 4, Giro del Trentino
1st, Stage 9, Giro d'Italia
1992
1st, Giro del Veneto
1st, Tre Valli Varesine
1st, Wincanton Classic
1993
1st, Tre Valli Varesine
1st, Stage 20, Giro d'Italia
Combativity award, Tour de France
1994
1st, Vuelta a los Valles Mineros
1st, Stage 19, Giro d'Italia
