= Selle Italia–Eurocar =

Short-lived Italian professional road cycling team

Team information
- Registered: Italy
- Founded: 1990
- Disbanded: 1991
- Discipline: Rad

Key personnel
- Team managers: Domenico Cavallo; Giancarlo Montedori

Team name history
- 1990 1991: Selle Italia–Eurocar–Mosoca–Galli; Selle Italia–Magniarredo–Veta

Selle Italia–Eurocar was an Italian professional road cycling team that existed in 1990 and 1991.

== Major victories ==
1990
Giro del Friuli, Leonardo Sierra
Stage 17 Giro d'Italia, Leonardo Sierra
1991
Giro del Lazio, Andrea Tafi
Giro del Trentino, Leonardo Sierra
