= 1990 Tour de France =

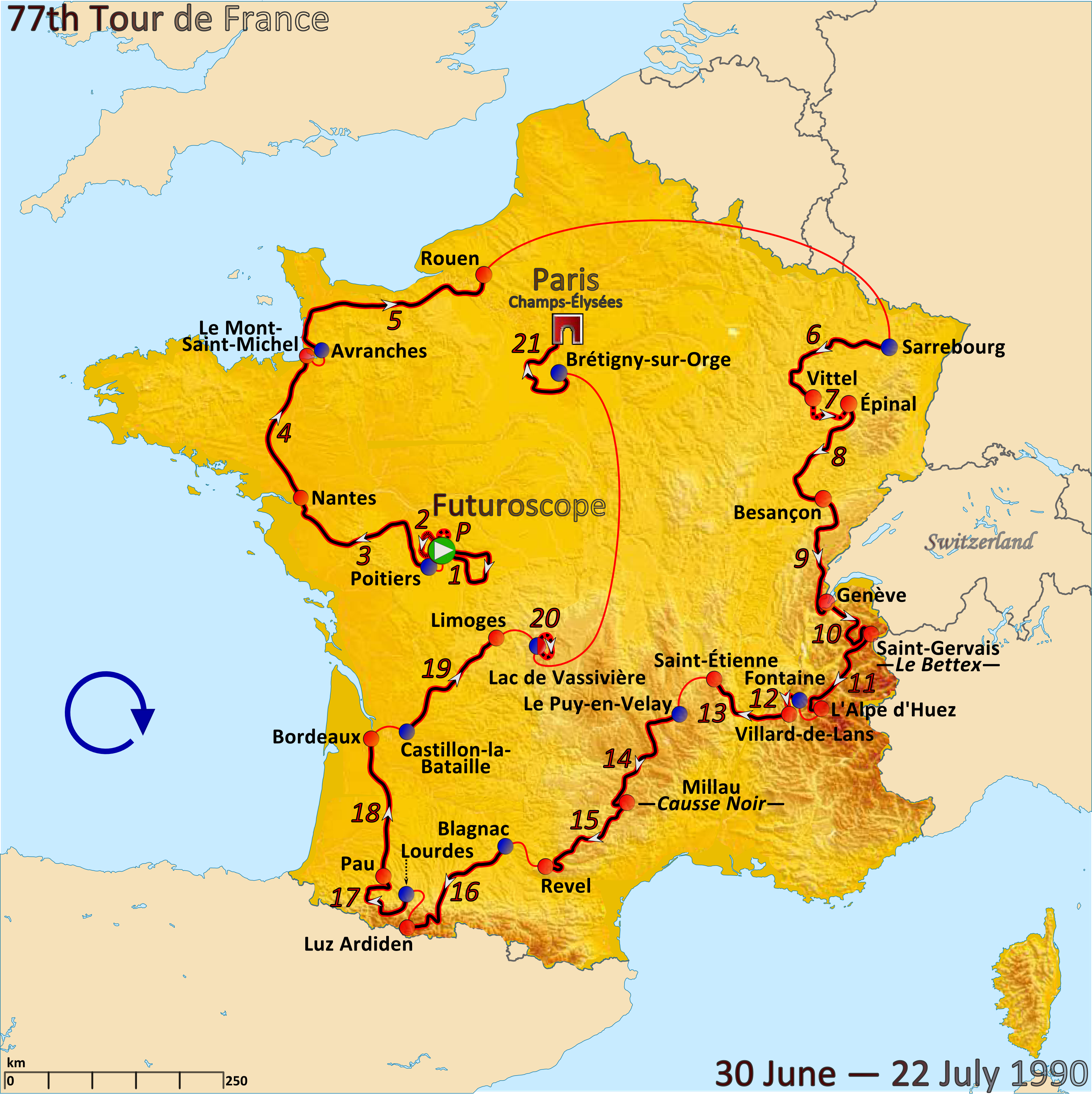
- Route of the 1990 Tour de France

Race details
- Dates: 30 June – 22 July 1990
- Stages: 21 + prologue
- Distance: 3,403.8 km (2,115.0 mi)
- Winning time: 90h 43' 20"

Results
Jersey awarded to the overall winner	Winner	Greg LeMond (USA)	(Z–Tomasso)
	Second	Claudio Chiappucci (ITA)	(Carrera Jeans–Vagabond)
	Third	Erik Breukink (NED)	(PDM–Concorde–Ultima)
Jersey awarded to the points classification winner	Points	Olaf Ludwig (DDR)	(Panasonic–Sportlife)
Jersey awarded to the mountains classification winner	Mountains	Thierry Claveyrolat (FRA)	(RMO)
	Young rider	Gilles Delion (FRA)	(Helvetia–La Suisse)
	Combativity	Eduardo Chozas (ESP)	(ONCE)
	Team	Z–Tomasso	

The 1990 Tour de France was the 77th edition of the Tour de France, one of cycling's Grand Tours. It took place between 30 June and 22 July 1990. The 3,403.8 km (2,115.0 mi) race consisted of 21 stages and a prologue. American Greg LeMond (Z–Tomasso) repeated his 1989 victory in the general classification, ahead of Claudio Chiappucci (Carrera Jeans–Vagabond) and Erik Breukink (PDM–Concorde–Ultima) in second and third place respectively.

The Tour started with a prologue time trial at the Futuroscope theme park, won by Thierry Marie (Castorama). On the first stage, a four-rider group escaped and gained more than ten minutes on the rest of the field. Steve Bauer (7-Eleven) became the new leader of the race, but faltered in the Alps as Ronan Pensec (Z–Tomasso), also from the escape group, took over the race lead. Two days later, during a mountain time trial to Villard-de-Lans, the lead passed to Claudio Chiappucci, who had been in the same group as well. Chiappucci fought to hang on to his advantage over defending champion LeMond, but was overtaken in the final time trial on the penultimate stage. It was LeMond's third Tour victory, a feat he achieved without winning an individual stage.

The points classification was won by Olaf Ludwig (Panasonic–Sportlife), while the mountains classification was won by Thierry Claveyrolat (RMO). Gilles Delion (Helvetia–La Suisse) was the best young rider, while Eduardo Chozas (ONCE) was awarded the super-combativity prize. Z–Tomasso, the team of race winner LeMond, won the team classification.

The 1990 race was the first edition in which riders from Eastern Bloc nations participated. Ludwig became the first rider from East Germany and Dimitri Konyshev (Alfa Lum) was the first Soviet rider to win a stage at the Tour.

== Teams ==
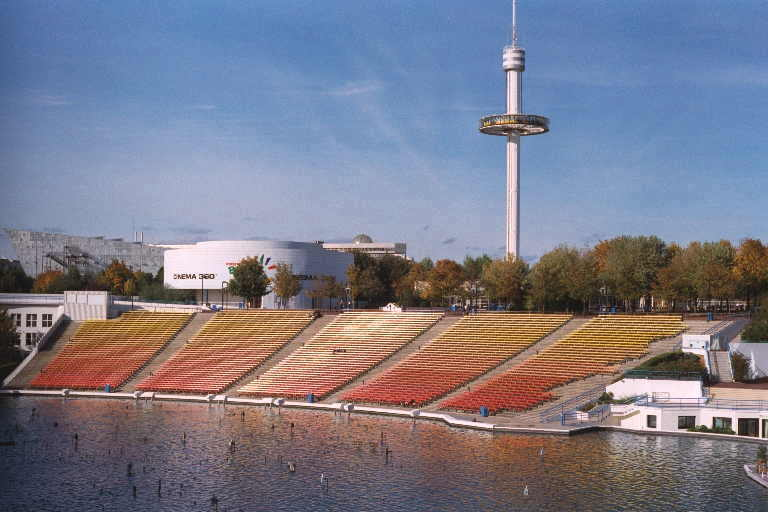
The lakeside arena at the Futuroscope theme park hosted the team presentation ceremony.

The 1990 Tour had a starting field of 22 teams of 9 cyclists. Of those 22, 16 teams qualified based on the FICP team rankings, while six teams were given wildcards. Notable teams who failed to qualify and were not invited were BH–Amaya Seguros and Café de Colombia with Luis Herrera, a double former winner of the mountains classification.

The largest numbers of riders from a nation came from France (35), with the next largest coming from Belgium (27), Spain (25), Italy (22), Netherlands (19), Colombia (14) and Switzerland (13). For the first time, riders from the Eastern Bloc competed in the Tour, ten in total, enabled by the changing political climate brought about by the revolutions in the Eastern Bloc countries. While several riders from Warsaw Pact nations had transferred to established Western teams, the Alfa Lum team was made up of exclusively Soviet cyclists. Three more teams included cyclists of a single nationality: Lotto–Superclub (Belgian), Postobón–Manzana–Ryalcao (Colombian), and Ariostea (Italian).

Of the 198 cyclists starting the race, 58 were riding the Tour de France for the first time. The average age of riders in the race was 27.77 years, ranging from the 21-year-old Antonio Miguel Díaz (Kelme–Ibexpress) to the 35-year-old Gilbert Duclos-Lassalle (Z–Tomasso). The Kelme–Ibexpress cyclists had the youngest average age while the riders on Panasonic–Sportlife had the oldest. The presentation of the teams – where the members of each team's roster are introduced in front of the media and local dignitaries – took place at the lakeside arena at Futuroscope theme park, 10 km (6.2 mi) north of the city of Poitiers, west-central France, which later hosted the prologue stage.

The teams entering the race were:

Qualified teams

- 7-Eleven
- Ariostea
- Banesto
- Buckler–Colnago–Decca
- Carrera Jeans–Vagabond
- Castorama
- Chateau d'Ax–Salotti
- Helvetia–La Suisse
- Histor–Sigma
- Lotto–Superclub
- ONCE
- Panasonic–Sportlife
- PDM–Concorde–Ultima
- RMO
- Weinmann–SMM–Uster
- Z–Tomasso

Invited teams

- Alfa Lum
- Kelme–Ibexpress
- Postobón–Manzana–Ryalcao
- Seur
- Toshiba
- TVM

== Pre-race favourites ==
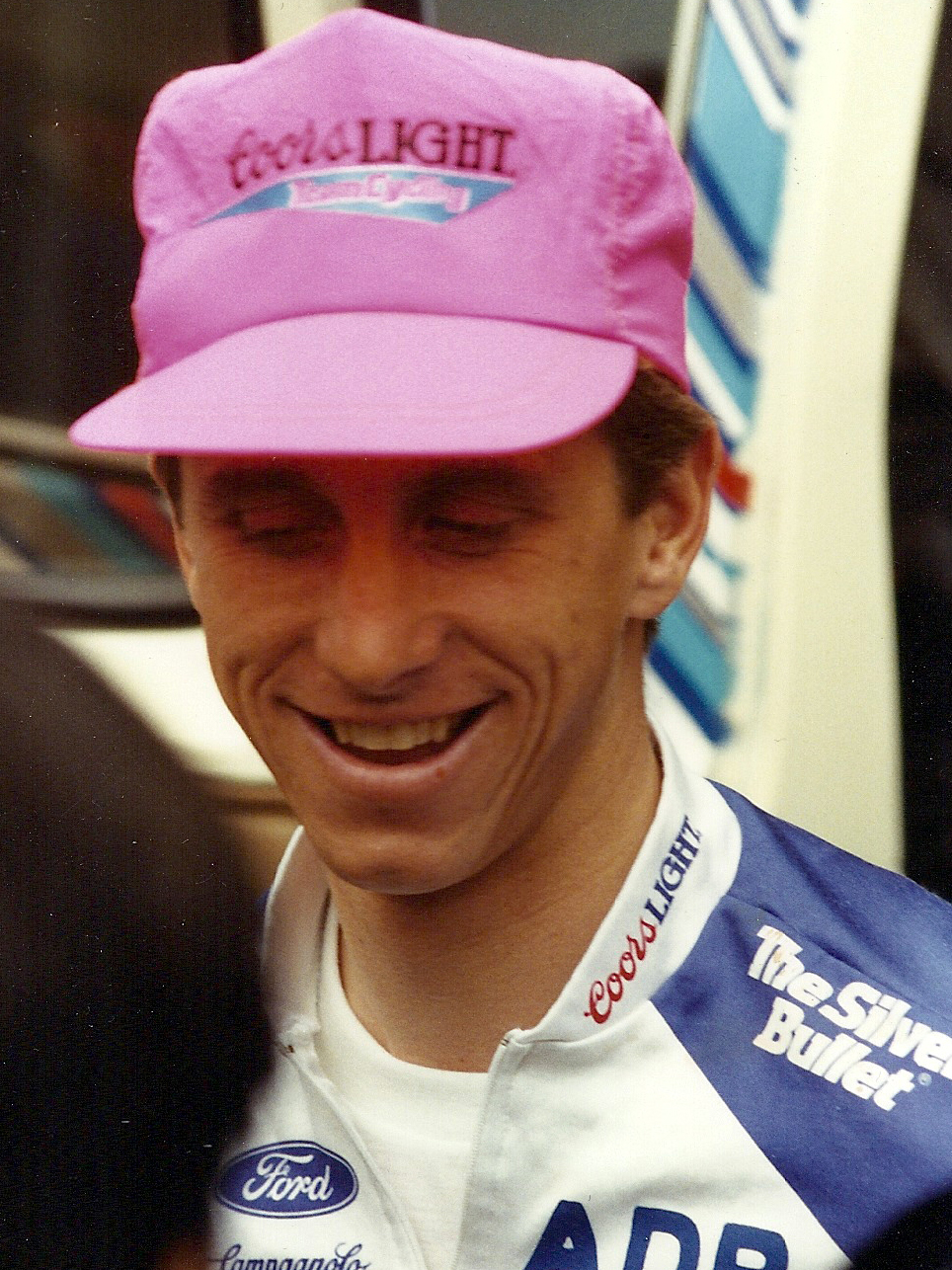
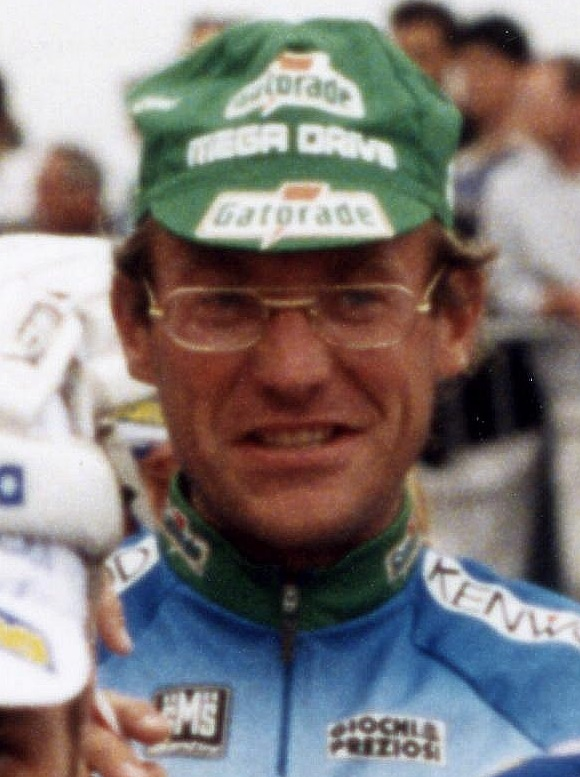
Greg LeMond (left) and Laurent Fignon (right) were the leading favourites for the general classification, having finished the 1989 Tour in first and second place respectively.

In the lead up to the Tour, the main contenders for the general classification were Greg LeMond (Z–Tomasso), Laurent Fignon (Castorama), Pedro Delgado (Banesto), and Stephen Roche (Histor–Sigma). All four were former Tour winners. They were the preeminent stage race specialists, with each one focusing their season around the Tour.

The leading favourite was two-time Tour winner LeMond, who returned to defend his title. After winning the Tour in 1989 and the World Championship road race, LeMond had not taken another victory. He had finished Paris–Nice more than eight minutes behind the winner and struggled at the Giro d'Italia, where he placed 105th. He was considered overweight due to lack of training and had been suffering from mononucleosis. Encouraging signs came during the Tour de Suisse, just weeks before the start of the Tour de France, where he finished tenth. LeMond did not consider himself a favourite for victory going into the race, but declared that he would be disappointed should he not finish on the podium. For the first time at a Tour, LeMond had the support of his whole team, including Robert Millar, (Note: Later in life Robert Millar underwent a gender transition and is now known as Philippa York. For the purpose of this article, her name and gender from 1990 are used.) who had won the Critérium du Dauphiné Libéré and placed second at the Tour de Suisse just prior to the start of the Tour.

The sport newspaper L'Équipe was expecting a close battle between LeMond and Fignon, who had finished in second place in 1989, only eight seconds behind LeMond. Fignon had previously won the Tour in 1983 and 1984. A crash on stage 5 of the Giro had forced Fignon to abandon the race he had won in 1989. He returned to racing at the Route du Sud and later competed in the Tour de Luxembourg as preparation for the Tour de France and had apparently overcome his injuries. Writing in his autobiography, Fignon later admitted that his crashes and poor results earlier in the season had left him "a tired man, physically and mentally" and that he entered the Tour with "few illusions about what was coming". Fignon's squad was not seen as the strongest, but they were dedicated to him and managed by Cyrille Guimard, who had led multiple riders to Tour victories.

Delgado, the winner of the 1988 Tour, was in good form after placing second at the Vuelta a España earlier in the year. He was part of the strong Banesto team, with Miguel Induráin to help him in the mountains. Roche, winner of the 1987 edition, was on the start line, but still troubled by recurring knee pain. His best result of the season had been a second place behind Induráin at Paris–Nice.

Erik Breukink was among several other riders named as favourites. Sean Kelly, was the record winner of the points classification and appeared in good form, having just won the Tour de Suisse, but was thought to be working for Breukink. Spanish newspaper El País considered Delgado to be the top favourite, but also named Fignon, LeMond, and Gianni Bugno (Chateau d'Ax–Salotti), who had won the Giro earlier that year, as potential winners. Mundo Deportivo also named Charly Mottet (RMO) among the favourites. His best result that season had been a second place behind Bugno at the Giro. Also on the start line was Marco Giovannetti, winner of the Vuelta and third at the Giro. According to cycling journalist Geoffrey Nicholson, his ability to perform in another three-week Grand Tour was doubted from the start, and it was agreed that he only participated to ensure a wildcard entry for his team, Seur.

Gert-Jan Theunisse (Panasonic–Sportlife), fourth the previous year and winner of the mountains classification, did not start due to two positive doping tests earlier in the season.

== Route and stages ==
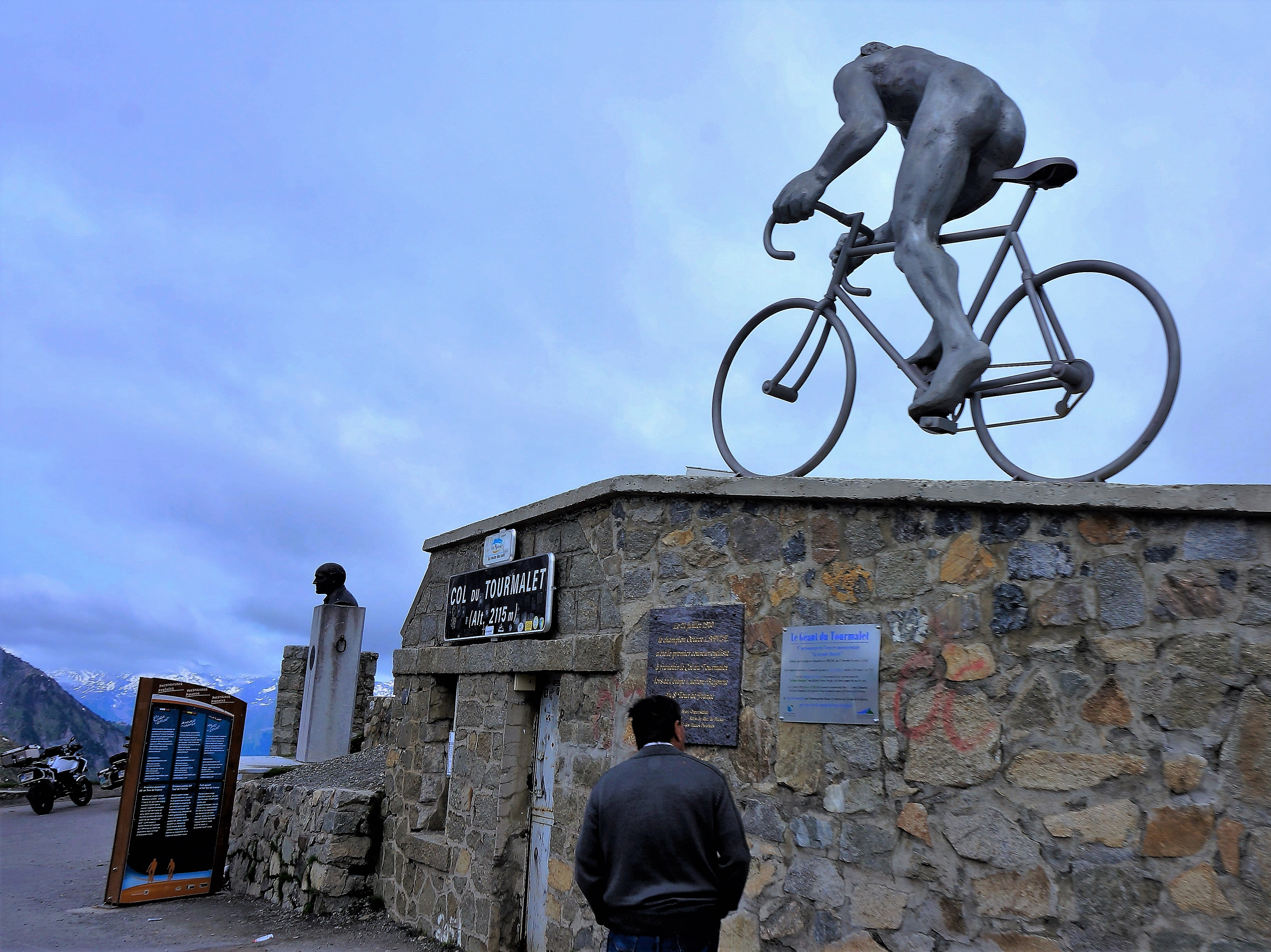
The Col du Tourmalet mountain pass was the highest point of elevation in the race, at 2,115 m (6,939 ft).

The 1990 Tour de France started on 30 June, and had two rest days. The race had its Grand Départ (opening stages) in and around the Futuroscope theme park, whose owners paid around $1 million for the right to host the beginning of the race. After two stages, both held on the same day, also at Futuroscope, the Tour took a clockwise route around France. The race traveled north towards the English Channel and then east to Rouen. A plane transfer on the first rest day brought the field to Sarrebourg on the border to Germany before the race turned south towards the Alps. On the second rest day, the Tour remained in Villard-de-Lans. The race then turned south-west to the Pyrenees before turning north again towards Paris, ending with the ceremonial Champs-Élysées stage.

Stage 5 from Avranches to Rouen was the longest at 301 km (187 mi). As of 2020, this is the last time that a Tour de France stage exceeded 300 km (190 mi). The shortest road stage was the tenth, from Geneva to Saint-Gervais, at 118.5 km (73.6 mi). The highest point of elevation in the race was 2,115 m (6,939 ft) at the summit of the Col du Tourmalet mountain pass on stage 16. It was among five hors catégorie (beyond category) rated climbs in the race.

Stage characteristics and winners
Stage	Date	Course	Distance	Type	Winner
P	30 June	Futuroscope	6.3 km (3.9 mi)	Individual time trial	Thierry Marie (FRA)
1	1 July	Futuroscope	138.5 km (86.1 mi)	Plain stage	Frans Maassen (NED)
2	1 July	Futuroscope	44.5 km (27.7 mi)	Team time trial	(Netherlands) Panasonic–Sportlife
3	2 July	Poitiers to Nantes	233.0 km (144.8 mi)	Plain stage	Moreno Argentin (ITA)
4	3 July	Nantes to Mont Saint-Michel	203.0 km (126.1 mi)	Plain stage	Johan Museeuw (BEL)
5	4 July	Avranches to Rouen	301.0 km (187.0 mi)	Plain stage	Gerrit Solleveld (NED)
	5 July	Rouen		Rest day	
6	6 July	Sarrebourg to Vittel	202.5 km (125.8 mi)	Plain stage	Jelle Nijdam (NED)
7	7 July	Vittel to Épinal	61.5 km (38.2 mi)	Individual time trial	Raúl Alcalá (MEX)
8	8 July	Épinal to Besançon	181.5 km (112.8 mi)	Plain stage	Olaf Ludwig (GDR)
9	9 July	Besançon to Geneva (Switzerland)	196.0 km (121.8 mi)	Hilly stage	Massimo Ghirotto (ITA)
10	10 July	Geneva (Switzerland) to Saint-Gervais	118.5 km (73.6 mi)	Stage with mountain(s)	Thierry Claveyrolat (FRA)
11	11 July	Saint-Gervais to Alpe d'Huez	182.5 km (113.4 mi)	Stage with mountain(s)	Gianni Bugno (ITA)
12	12 July	Fontaine to Villard-de-Lans	33.5 km (20.8 mi)	Mountain time trial	Erik Breukink (NED)
	13 July	Villard-de-Lans		Rest day	
13	14 July	Villard-de-Lans to Saint-Étienne	149.0 km (92.6 mi)	Hilly stage	Eduardo Chozas (ESP)
14	15 July	Le Puy-en-Velay to Millau	205.0 km (127.4 mi)	Hilly stage	Marino Lejarreta (ESP)
15	16 July	Millau to Revel	170.0 km (105.6 mi)	Plain stage	Charly Mottet (FRA)
16	17 July	Blagnac to Luz Ardiden	215.0 km (133.6 mi)	Stage with mountain(s)	Miguel Induráin (ESP)
17	18 July	Lourdes to Pau	150.0 km (93.2 mi)	Stage with mountain(s)	Dimitri Konychev (URS)
18	19 July	Pau to Bordeaux	202.0 km (125.5 mi)	Plain stage	Gianni Bugno (ITA)
19	20 July	Castillon-la-Bataille to Limoges	182.5 km (113.4 mi)	Plain stage	Guido Bontempi (ITA)
20	21 July	Lac de Vassivière to Lac de Vassivière	45.5 km (28.3 mi)	Individual time trial	Erik Breukink (NED)
21	22 July	Brétigny-sur-Orge to Paris (Champs-Élysées)	182.5 km (113.4 mi)	Plain stage	Johan Museeuw (BEL)
	Total		3,403.8 km (2,115 mi)		

== Race overview ==
=== Grand Départ at Futuroscope ===
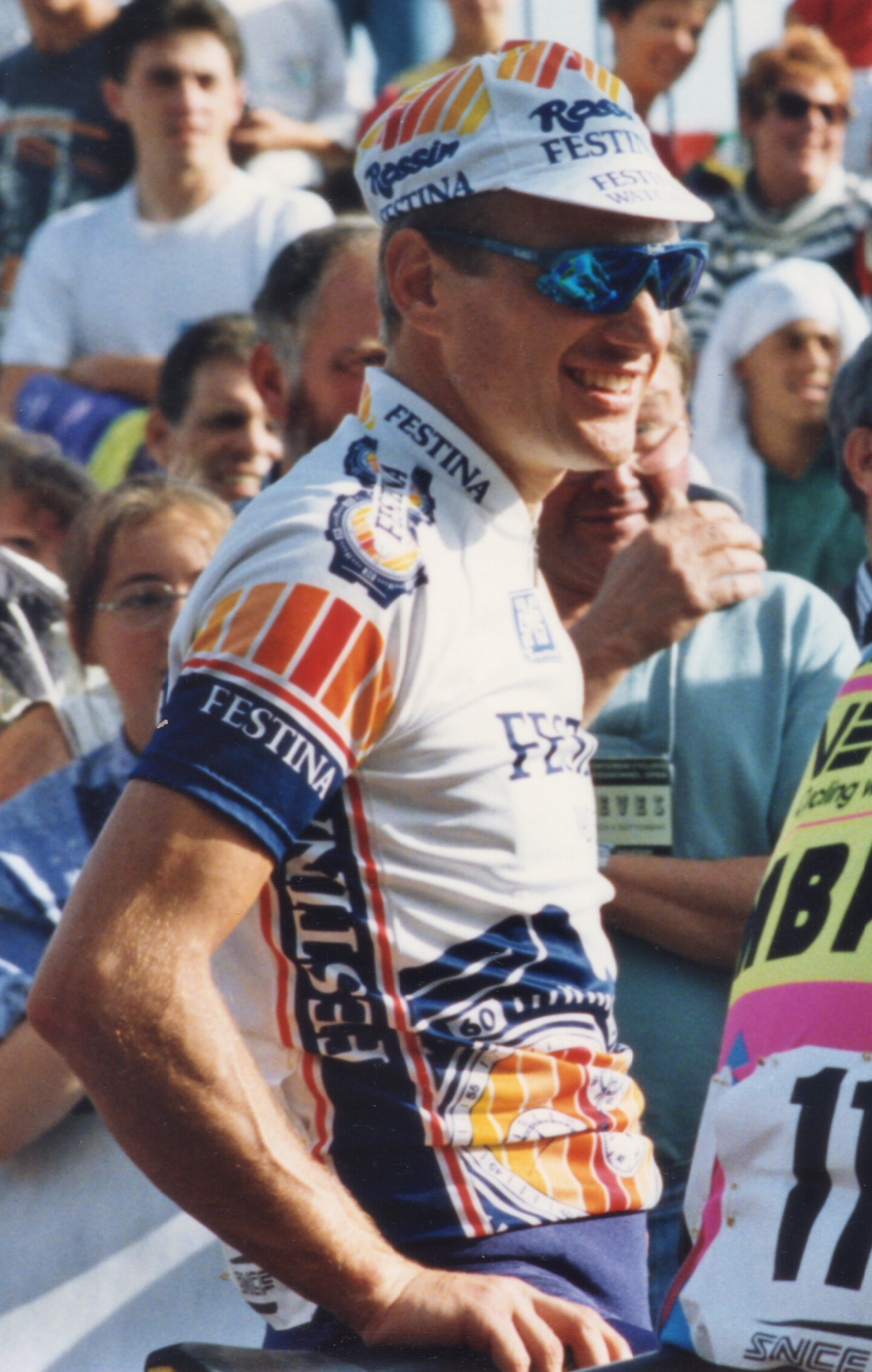
Thierry Marie (pictured in 1993) won the prologue time trial.

The prologue at Futuroscope was won by Thierry Marie (Castorama), a specialist in the discipline, who had also taken the first yellow jersey in 1986. He recorded a time of 7:49 minutes, four seconds faster than LeMond and Raúl Alcalá (PDM–Concorde–Ultima) in second and third respectively. Fignon finished in 15th place, 19 seconds slower than Marie, with Delgado in 26th place losing a further five seconds.

The first and the second stage were run on the same day, the second stage in the team time trial format. After just 6 km (3.7 mi) of the first stage, Claudio Chiappucci (Carrera Jeans–Vagabond) broke away from the field. He had won the mountain classifications at both Paris–Nice and the Giro d'Italia that year and aimed at getting the jersey early on in the Tour as well. He was joined in his breakaway by Steve Bauer (7-Eleven), Ronan Pensec (Z–Tomasso), and Frans Maassen (Buckler–Colnago–Decca). With the team time trial looming in the afternoon, the field allowed the break to draw out an advantage. Additionally, a blockade by sheep farmers delayed the peloton, the main field, and caused several crashes, including one involving Delgado. (Note: The farmers were protesting against reduced government subsidies and increased imports, especially from Eastern Europe.) Chiappucci took the points at the mountain sprints, ensuring that he would wear the polka-dot jersey for the next stage. 10 km (6.2 mi) from the finish, the lead was still at 13 minutes. As Maassen took the stage victory ahead of Pensec, the four-man group still retained an advantage of 10:35 minutes over the rest of the field. Bauer took the lead in the general classification, having posted the fastest time in the prologue. Later in the day the team time trial was won by the Panasonic–Sportlife team. Seven seconds slower, PDM–Concorde–Ultima finished in second place. Fignon's Castorama squad finished fifth, 33 seconds slower than Panasonic, but 20 seconds faster than LeMond's Z team, who were seventh. In between them were 7-Eleven with yellow-jersey wearer Bauer, who retained his overall lead.

=== North-west ===
Stage 3 began with an early attack by Stephen Roche, who was followed by LeMond. This prompted the teams of Bauer and Delgado to give chase, and the field was back together after 10 km (6.2 mi). At 23 km (14 mi), Fignon punctured a tyre, but he was able to rejoin shortly after. After 92 km (57 mi) the race was interrupted by another protest from sheep farmers, who had four fallen trees ready to block the road. The organisers received news of the blockade early and used a local youth on a motorcycle to lead the field through backstreets around the protest. The stage distance therefore increased by 5 km (3.1 mi), with a total of 25 km (16 mi) of the race neutralised. With 35 km (22 mi) of the stage remaining, Roque de la Cruz (Seur) became the first rider to abandon the Tour, following a crash which also brought down Fignon, who again had to chase in order to regain contact with the main group. At this point, Moreno Argentin (Ariostea) had already attacked and was building an advantage on the rest of the field. He also crashed, but was able to remount and continued to win the stage by 2:29 minutes. In the peloton, Christophe Lavainne (Castorama) won the sprint and raised in arms in celebration, unaware that Argentin had already finished. Through obtaining bonuses at intermediate sprints, Olaf Ludwig (Panasonic–Sportlife) took the lead in the points classification.

Stage 4 saw Gilles Delion (Helvetia–La Suisse) attack while Gérard Rué (Castorama) was greeting his family in his home town. (Note: Tour etiquette dictates that local riders who race through their home regions are allowed to drive ahead of the field to greet their friends and family, before falling back into the peloton. This tradition is called bon de sortie in French.) Delion was caught by Edwig Van Hooydonck (Buckler–Colnago–Decca), but both were quickly brought back by the Panasonic team, who were working for Ludwig to win the stage. Next, Søren Lilholt (Histor–Sigma) attacked and was later joined by Kurt Steinmann (Weinmann–SMM–Uster) and William Pulido (Postobón–Manzana–Ryalcao). The escapees enjoyed a maximum advantage of 45 seconds, but were caught with 14 km (8.7 mi) to go. 3 km (1.9 mi) later, the peloton passed through the narrow streets of Villechèrel, causing a crash and the field to split. Bugno, Delgado, and Fignon were caught out behind the incident. While Delgado and Bugno lost 21 seconds in the end, Fignon lost 44 seconds to his rivals in the general classification. At the finish, which for the first time was at Mont Saint-Michel, Ludwig opened his sprint too early, allowing Johan Museeuw (Lotto–Superclub), who won the stage, and Guido Bontempi (Carrera Jeans–Vagabond) to pass him. Robert Millar was caught up in a crash, losing nine minutes, effectively ruling him out from competing in the general classification.

Stage 5, by far the longest at 301 km (187 mi), was run in wet weather. As the peloton sped up to catch an early breakaway, Fignon drifted backwards and ultimately abandoned the Tour at the first feeding station. After the breakaway was caught, Gerrit Solleveld (Buckler–Colnago–Decca) attacked and stayed away, winning the stage 4:27 minutes ahead of Museeuw, who won the sprint of the field. Argentin, still bruised from his fall on stage 3 and another on stage 5, abandoned after the rest day.

=== North-east and Jura ===
During stage 6, Chiappucci sustained two punctured tyres, both times at the start of the two ascents of the day. This meant that he was unable to defend his lead in the mountain classification, and the polka-dot jersey went to Dimitri Konyshev (Alfa Lum), who became the first Soviet rider to wear a leader's jersey at the Tour de France. Bugno attacked shortly behind the feed zone, leading to a number of reactions from the field, but after 173 km (107 mi), the peloton was back together. A small group, containing Museeuw and Viatcheslav Ekimov (Panasonic–Sportlife), among others, leapt away 3 km (1.9 mi) from the finish. Jelle Nijdam (Buckler–Colnago–Decca) accelerated from this group with 300 m (330 yd) to go and won the stage, ahead of Jesper Skibby (TVM) and Museeuw.

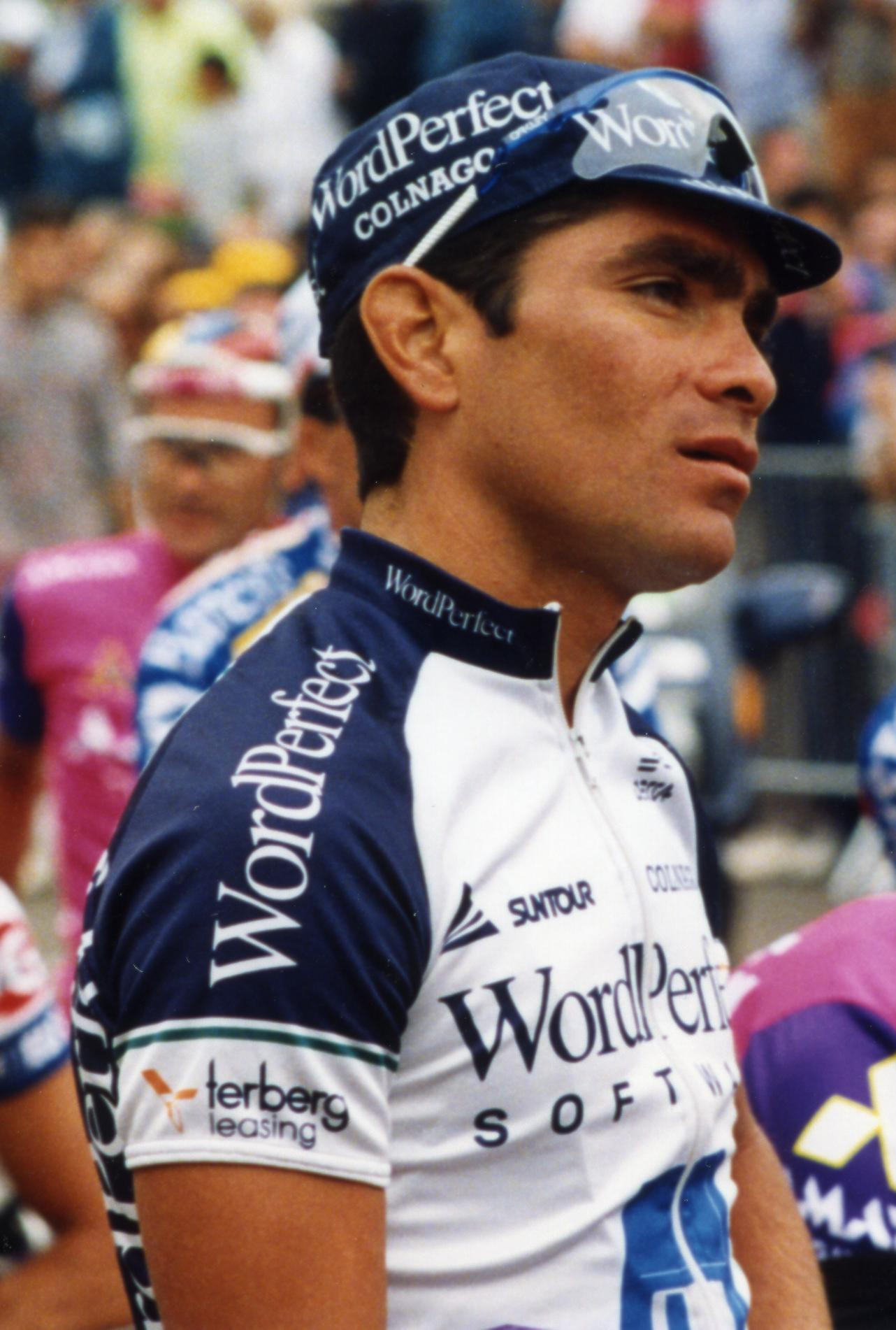
Raúl Alcalá (pictured at the 1993 Tour de France) won the time trial on stage 7.

Stage 7's individual time trial was run in changing conditions. While the early starters competed in the dry, the later riders rode on wet roads. Miguel Induráin set an early fast time and held the lead for most of the day. Greg LeMond started fast, but faded later on to eventually finish fifth. Alcalá, also a late starter, was the fastest rider, 1:24 ahead of Induráin's time. Bugno was third, ahead of Delgado. Of the riders from the stage-1 breakaway, Pensec was fastest, in seventh place. He remained second overall however, 17 seconds behind Bauer, who finished the time trial in 14th place, one place ahead of Chiappucci. Stephen Roche lost 3 minutes in the last 3 km (1.9 mi) alone, suffering from hyperglycemia. Likewise, Charly Mottet lost significant time, finishing 3½ minutes behind Alcalá. Alcalá moved into fifth place overall, still more than seven minutes behind Bauer.

Early during stage 8, a four-man breakaway went ahead, but was quickly caught. The speed of the peloton saw Álvaro Pino (Seur), winner of the 1986 Vuelta a España, abandon the race. Michel Vermote (RMO) then attacked after 33 km (21 mi) on a section of cobbled road. His maximum lead was over 11 minutes, but after about 120 km (75 mi) on his own, he was brought back by the main field. In the final 10 km (6.2 mi), a group of 13 riders escaped, including Ludwig and Museeuw. Ludwig judged his sprint well this time and beat Museeuw for the win. It was the first stage victory by a rider from East Germany and from the Eastern Bloc in the Tour de France.

Stage 9 headed into Switzerland and was the last day that featured rain, before temperatures began to rise significantly. An escape group went clear after 74 km (46 mi), which included Frans Maassen, who was still in fourth place overall. This prompted Bauer's 7-Eleven team to chase, bringing the group back after 44 km (27 mi). At the Côte des Rousses, the first second-category climb of the Tour, Massimo Ghirotto (Carrera Jeans–Vagabond) and Eduardo Chozas (ONCE) were out in front alone. On the same climb, Jean-François Bernard (Toshiba), third in the 1987 Tour, fell behind and out of contention. The two escapees held on to their advantage into the finish town of Geneva, where Ghirotto edged out Chozas in the sprint.

=== Alps ===
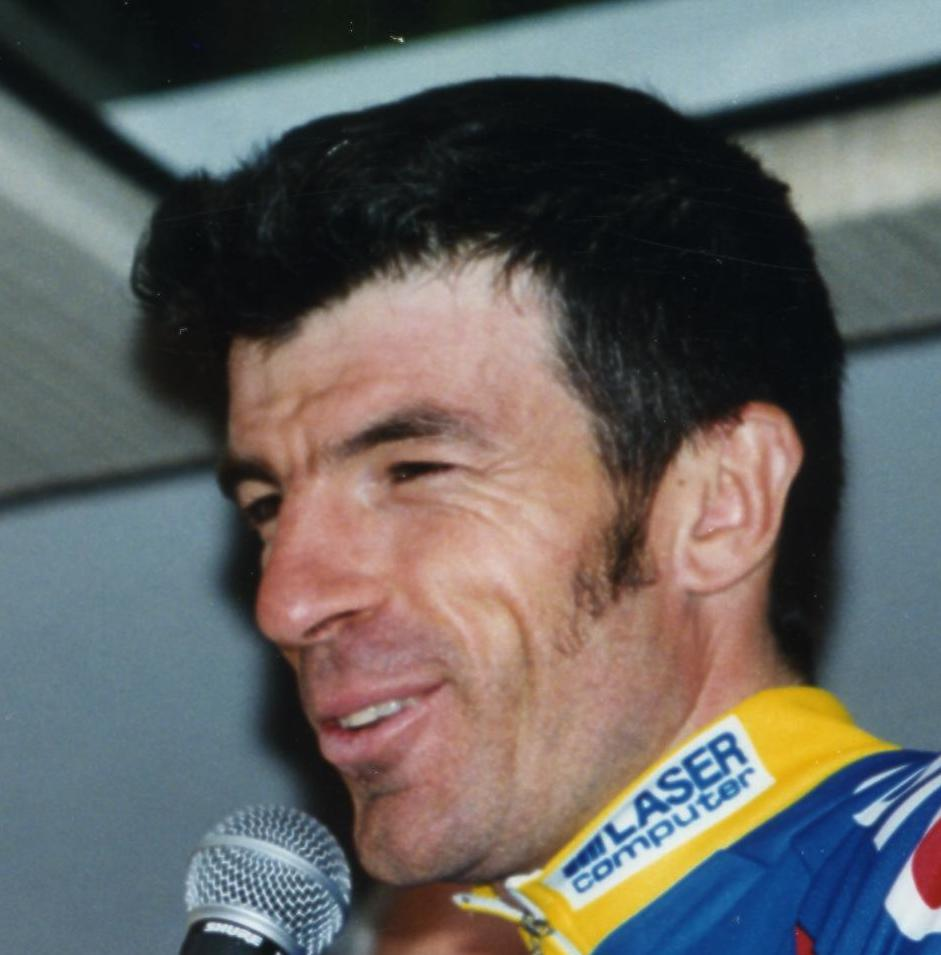
Ronan Pensec took over the race lead after stage 10.

Stage 10 was the first real test in the mountains, with a summit finish at the Saint Gervais-les-Baines ski resort on Mont Blanc. On the first climb of the day, the Col de la Colombière, Omar Hernández (Postobón–Manzana–Ryalcao) attacked, followed by Thierry Claveyrolat (RMO). As Hernández slowed, Claveyrolat overtook him and continued on alone, riding the rest of the stage on his own to take victory. He also took the lead in the mountains classification, which he would retain for the rest of the Tour. Behind him, Delgado attacked on the final climb with 6 km (3.7 mi) remaining, putting Bauer into difficulty. Pensec, who celebrated his 27th birthday, stayed with the other favourites and took over the yellow jersey. He led Chiappucci by 50 seconds, while Bauer fell back to third, 1:21 minutes adrift. Among the pre-race favourites, LeMond lost 19 seconds to Delgado, but finished with Bugno, Induráin, Alcalá, and Breukink. Bugno received a 20-second penalty for accepting food late in the stage, when it was no longer allowed.

On stage 11, the course ended with the final ascent to Alpe d'Huez, considered one of the most iconic climbs in cycling. Two mountains had to be crossed beforehand: the Col de la Madeleine and the Col du Glandon. Claveyrolat attacked again, early on during the ascent of the Madeleine, and gathered the mountain points at the summit. Mottet started to drop behind the group of favourites on the Madeleine, while Bernard retired. On the descent, Induráin got away but was overtaken by Claveyrolat on the climb of the Glandon. In between the climbs, at the feed zone, LeMond was involved in a crash, but able to carry on. On the Glandon, Delgado accelerated and only LeMond and Bugno were able to follow. Together they caught Induráin, who set the pace in the group through the ensuing valley and ensured that they reached Claveyrolat by the foot of the final climb. Shortly after the group began the ascent, Delgado attacked, with LeMond and Bugno following. As the pace slowed, Claveyrolat, Parra, and Breukink managed to catch back up. 3 km (1.9 mi) from the finish, Delgado lost contact with Bugno, who accelerated and took LeMond, Breukink, Claveyrolat, and Parra with him. It were Bugno and LeMond who were fastest along the finishing straight, with Bugno coming out on top to win the stage. Breukink finished third, one second behind LeMond in second place. Meanwhile, Millar paced Pensec up the climb, who finished 48 seconds behind Bugno and retained the race lead. Delgado lost forty seconds, while Induráin, exhausted by his work on the flat, lost 12 minutes on Alpe d'Huez, falling from contention. Chiappucci finished 1:48 minutes behind Bugno. This left Pensec first overall, 1:28 minutes ahead of Chiappucci, with LeMond up to third, but still 9:04 minutes behind his teammate. Alcalá had lost 5:41 minutes on Bugno, and therefore dropped to eighth place overall.

Pensec lost the yellow jersey the following day, at stage 12's mountain time trial to Villard-de-Lans. He finished almost three minutes slower than Chiappucci, who took the overall lead, now 1:17 minutes ahead of Pensec. The winner of the stage was Breukink, with Delgado in second place, thirty seconds slower. Delgado performed well despite problems with his rear wheel which forced him to change bikes within the last kilometre. Induráin produced another good performance, finishing third at 43 seconds. LeMond suffered during the second half of the climb and finished fifth, dropping to fourth in the general classification behind Breukink. Breukink was 6:55 minutes behind new leader Chiappucci, with LeMond a further 32 seconds adrift. In fifth place followed Delgado, now 9:02 minutes in arrears.

=== Massif Central transition ===
Stage 13 to Saint-Étienne took place on Bastille Day, the French national holiday. Phil Anderson (TVM) led down the descent from Villard-de-Lans, followed by Mottet, which prompted a reaction by the main field and both riders were brought back after 33 km (21 mi). Several attempts to form lasting breakaways followed, but it took until the climb of the Côte d'Ardoix at 33 km (21 mi) for a 30-rider group to get away, including Pensec and Claveyrolat. Chiappucci, without the help of strong teammates, had to lead the chase himself, bringing back the breakaway 45 km (28 mi) from the finish. Just as the contact was made, a group of ten riders attacked, among them LeMond, Breukink, Induráin, and Andrew Hampsten (7-Eleven). At the foot of the last climb of the day, the Col de la Croix de Chaubouret, Delgado led a counter-attack with Bugno and Marino Lejarreta (ONCE). Although Induráin dropped back to aid Delgado's chase, the LeMond group maintained an advantage of thirty seconds until the finish. Here, Chozas won the sprint from Breukink and Hampsten. A group containing Alcalá, Roche, and Parra lost 3:09 minutes. Chiappucci came in with the peloton, losing 4:53 minutes. Pensec dropped from second to fourth in the general classification, arriving 7:47 minutes after Chozas. Chiappucci now led the race by 2:02 minutes over Breukink, with LeMond third at 2:34.

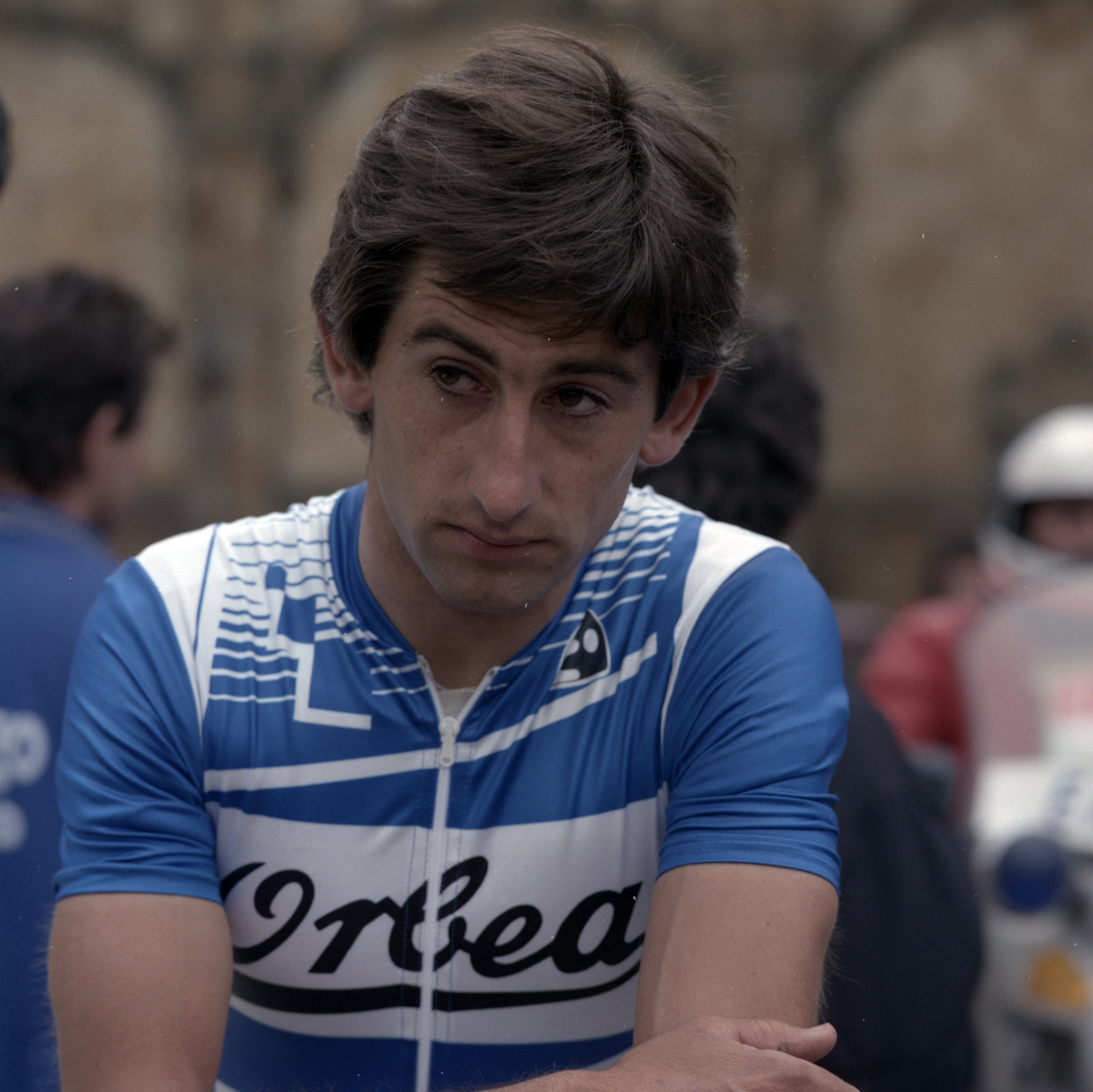
Marino Lejarreta (pictured in 1987) won stage 14, making it two victories in a row for the ONCE team.

During the early part of stage 14, Jean-Claude Colotti (RMO) was highly active. He joined an attack by teammate Claveyrolet at 8 km (5.0 mi), before setting off on his own after a further unsuccessful attempt to form a breakaway. After 91 km (57 mi), 17 more riders caught up to him. Jean-Claude Bagot (RMO) then attacked from the lead group with 20 km (12 mi) left to ride, but he was caught by the peloton on the final ascent to Causse Noir near Millau. Lejarreta accelerated from the group of favourites with 3 km (1.9 mi) to go, and was followed by Induráin and Bugno. At the finish, Lejarreta took victory, but did not raise his arms in celebration, thinking someone had finished ahead of him. 24 seconds later followed Induráin and Bugno. LeMond and Breukink finished together, another ten seconds behind. Chiappucci could only finish 13th, losing 13 seconds to LeMond and Breukink, whom he now led by 1:49 minutes in the general classification. Lejarreta moved up to seventh place overall.

Stage 15 was a transition stage, the last before the Pyrenees, and featured only smaller climbs. Adri van der Poel (Weinmann–SMM–Uster) launched an attack that resulted in an eleven-rider strong breakaway. This group was almost caught after 50 km (31 mi) of racing, but while three riders dropped back into the peloton, eight remained in front and were later joined by several others, who bridged across, including Roche, Mottet, Claveyrolet, and Chozas. The now 19-rider strong group increased their advantage to up to eight minutes, which would have moved Chozas up to fourth place overall. Therefore, the main field began to cut into their advantage, led by Z–Tomasso, Banesto, and PDM–Concorde–Ultima. Eventually, Mottet attacked from the lead group and held on to the finish, winning the stage by 2:02 minutes ahead of Giuseppe Calcaterra (Chateau d'Ax–Salotti). When the peloton reached the finish, a split occurred in the field, which gained Chiappucci three seconds on his rivals in the general classification.

=== Pyrenees ===
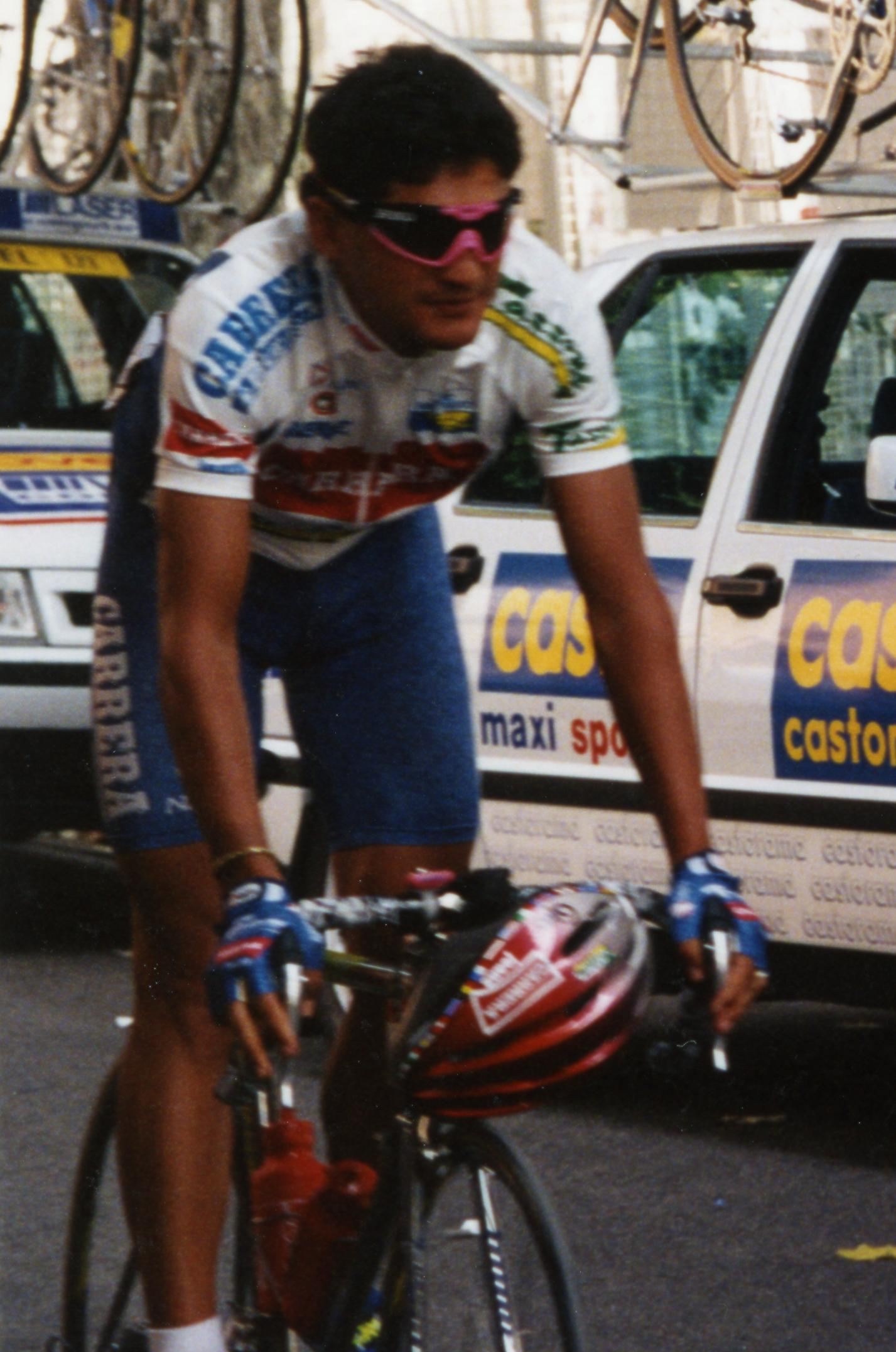
Claudio Chiappucci (pictured at the 1993 Tour de France) became an unexpected contender for the overall victory.

In very hot weather, stage 16 saw the last mountain-top finish of the Tour. In the second half of the stage, the summits of the Col d'Aspin, the Col du Tourmalet, and the final ascent to Luz Ardiden had to be climbed. On the early slopes of the Aspin, Chiappucci followed an attack by Jörg Müller (TVM) and found himself in a lead group, building an advantage on his rivals. At the summit, he led the group across 45 seconds ahead of the main field. As Z–Tomasso began to chase for LeMond on the approach to the Tourmalet, the gap began to decrease. In the front group, Miguel Ángel Martínez Torres (ONCE) attacked and got away on his own. Behind, in the group of favourites, Breukink experienced a jour sans, a day without energy, and began to fall behind. At the top of the Tourmalet, Chiappucci's lead over LeMond and Delgado was still 1:07 minutes, but in the valley before the final climb, he was caught with 20 km (12 mi) to go.

On the ascent to Luz Ardiden, Chiappucci defiantly set the pace at the front of the group. However, with 6 km (3.7 mi) left to race, an attack by Parra was too much and while LeMond, Induráin, and Lejarreta followed, Chiappucci fell behind. LeMond moved to the front and set a high pace as Parra was quickly dropped. They then caught the lone leader Martínez Torres with 2.5 km (1.6 mi) to go. Lejarreta was dropped shortly thereafter. For the duration of the climb LeMond worked at the front setting the pace to increase his time gains essentially winning the Tour on this attack. Induráin overtook him as they approached the summit and coming around the final turn he quickly turned his head around to verify LeMond was not going to challenge him for the stage win and began clapping his hands in celebration as he claimed the victory six seconds ahead of LeMond. Chiappucci eventually lost 2:19 minutes, which reduced his advantage over LeMond, who was now second overall, to just five seconds. Breukink lost 4:16 minutes, dropping to fourth behind Delgado, who finished 1:32 behind teammate Induráin.

I've never seen a descent that fast. [...] LeMond never braked once. He took each curve at top speed. He must have been hitting 80 kilometers an hour.

— Jean-François Pescheux, a Tour official following the race on a motorcycle, describing Greg LeMond's descent from the Col de Marie-Blanque

The next day's route from Lourdes to Pau was considered easier than the day before, with the two major climbs, the hors categorie Col d'Aubisque and the first-category Col de Marie-Blanque both coming during the first half of the stage. Early on, a 19-man breakaway formed, including riders such as Bauer, Konyshev, Acácio da Silva (Carrera Jeans–Vagabond), Johan Bruyneel (Lotto–Superclub), as well as LeMond's teammates Gilbert Duclos-Lassalle and Atle Kvålsvoll. On the Aubisque, Óscar Vargas (Postobón–Manzana–Ryalcao) attacked and reached the summit ahead of the lead group. On the Marie-Blanque, the situation had changed and Delgado's Banesto teammate Dominique Arnaud led solo over the top, 10:20 minutes ahead of the peloton. LeMond, already suffering with a saddle sore and swollen feet, got into even more trouble: isolated from his teammates, he punctured a tyre about 800 m (870 yd) from the summit. With the group of favourites, including yellow jersey Chiappucci, leaving him behind, LeMond had to wait 1:20 minutes for his team car to arrive. The new wheel given to him was rubbing on the frame, which meant that LeMond had to dismount again and change bikes. By now, he crossed the top of the Marie-Blanque 1:27 minutes behind Chiappucci. Teammates Éric Boyer and Jérôme Simon joined him, but had problems keeping up with LeMond during the descent, which he took flat out and without braking in order to catch back up. Duclos-Lassalle and Kvålsvoll were ordered by the team to stop and drop back from the lead group to aid LeMond in reaching Chiappucci after 20 km (12 mi) of chasing.

Up ahead, Bruyneel attacked from the lead group and was followed by Konyshev, who got the better of the Belgian in the two-man sprint for the stage victory. It was the first time that a Soviet or Russian rider had won a stage of the Tour de France. LeMond accused Chiappucci of violating the unwritten rules of the sport, where traditionally a leader is not attacked if they have a crash or mechanical difficulties. Indeed, the Carrera Jeans–Vagabond team had even called back da Silva from the breakaway to assist Chiappucci in extending his advantage.

=== Final stages ===
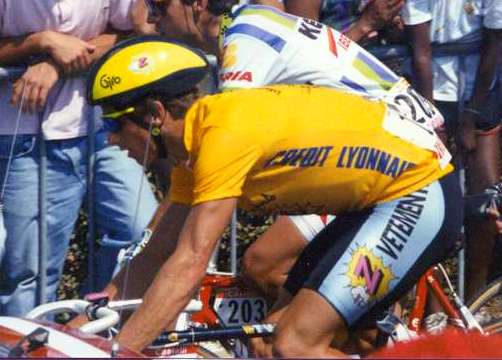
Greg LeMond on the final stage, wearing the yellow jersey as leader of the general classification

Stage 18 led the Tour to Bordeaux, a finishing town traditionally favouring the sprinters. The field started the day slowly and a real attack did not materialise until Anderson broke away after 139 km (86 mi). He was soon joined by six other riders, but the break was caught 34 km (21 mi) later. With 20 km (12 mi) to go, a more serious move formed, with 19 riders, which included LeMond, Chiappucci, Breukink, Bugno, and Alcalá. At 10 km (6.2 mi) remaining, Breukink, Bugno, and the latter's teammate, Roberto Gusmeroli, attacked from the leading group. The other 16 riders fell behind and were soon caught by the main field. At the finish, Gusmeroli led out Bugno, who easily beat Breukink to become the first rider to win two stages at that year's Tour. Breukink meanwhile gained 18 seconds on Delgado and therefore moved into third place overall.

The next day, the peloton equally made a slow start to the stage, with the first real attack coming more than halfway into the race, after 110 km (68 mi). Fifteen riders broke away from the field, including van der Poel, Pensec, Tony Rominger (Chateau d'Ax–Salotti), and Bontempi. After 153 km (95 mi), the group had swollen to 24 riders. Bontempi, formerly a very good sprinter, but now considered past his prime, attacked from the breakaway and went solo to the finish, where he won the stage, 1:28 minutes ahead of Dag Otto Lauritzen (7-Eleven). During the stage, the Tour circumvented another blockade by sheep farmers, which only managed to hold up the press caravan, but did not influence the race.

The individual time trial on the penultimate day, stage 20, became decisive for the race's outcome. LeMond easily made up the five seconds needed to overcome Chiappucci at the top of the standings. He finished fifth on the day, 2:21 minutes ahead of Chiappucci, who was 17th. Erik Breukink claimed the stage victory, 28 seconds ahead of his teammate Alcalá, with Lejarreta in third, ahead of Induráin. Delgado was eighth fastest, 2:21 behind Breukink, which put him in fourth place overall and left him just short of making the final podium for the fourth year in a row. Through their strong performances, Alcalá and Induráin returned to the top-ten riders in the general classification.

1990 was the most satisfying of my Tour wins. 1989 was exciting, 1986 was hard emotionally, but 1990 was the one I enjoyed the most.

— Greg LeMond, speaking about the 1990 Tour de France

The final stage to Paris was by tradition a ceremonial one, apart for the final section on the Champs-Élysées, when the stage victory is decided. Stephen Hodge tried to break away in Paris, in an attempt to make up the 16 seconds his ONCE team trailed Z–Tomasso in the team classification, but he was not successful. The stage came down to a sprint, won by Museeuw, ahead of Adriano Baffi (Ariostea) and Olaf Ludwig. It was the only time during that year's Tour that a stage finished in a mass sprint. LeMond crossed the finish line safely in the middle of the field, his arms aloft in celebration at his third overall Tour victory. 156 riders out of 198 starters reached the finish in Paris. In last place, the lanterne rouge, was Rodolfo Massi (Ariostea). Four teams managed to reach Paris with all nine riders: Lotto–Superclub, Postobón–Manzana–Ryalcao, 7-Eleven, and Chateau d'Ax–Salotti.

LeMond had won the Tour without taking a stage win. Since the end of World War II, only Roger Walkowiak (1956), Gastone Nencini (1960), and Lucien Aimar (1966) had done so. He countered criticism that he had not shown enough fighting spirit by not taking an individual stage win, saying: "If I had worried about individual stage victories, it's possible I would have lost the Tour de France." Particular praise was given after the Tour to Miguel Induráin, who some, such as his biographer Alasdair Fotheringham, speculated could have challenged for the overall victory had he not worked for Delgado, in particular on the stage to Alpe d'Huez, where he lost 12 minutes.

== Classification leadership and minor prizes ==
There were four main classifications in the 1990 Tour de France. The most important was the general classification, calculated by adding each cyclist's finishing times on each stage. The cyclist with the least accumulated time was the race leader, identified by the yellow jersey; the winner of this classification is considered the winner of the Tour. Time bonuses were distributed to the first three finishers of each stage that was not a mountain stage or a time trial. The winner received a 20-second time bonus, with 12 seconds for second and eight seconds for third place respectively. These bonuses were reduced to 12, 8, and 4 seconds on stage 1, since two stages were held on the same day. In addition, time bonuses could be won at intermediate sprints during the first half of the race. The first three riders across the line were granted a bonus of 6, 4, and 2 seconds respectively.

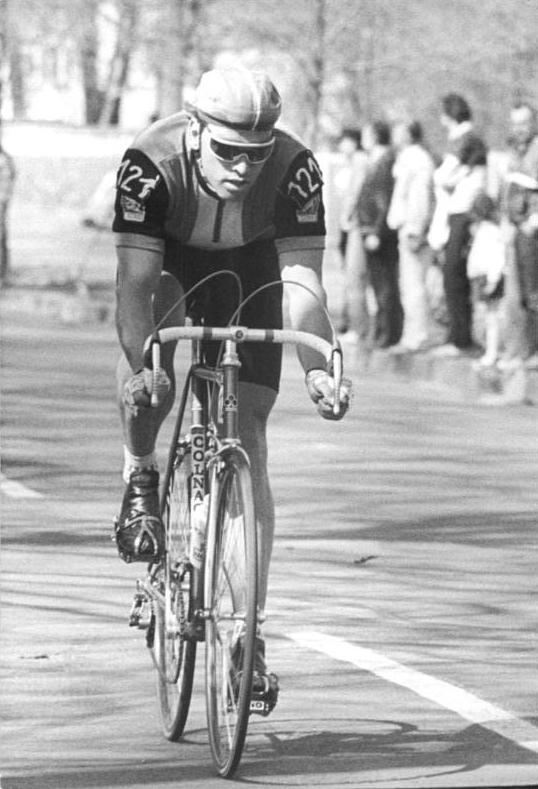
Olaf Ludwig (pictured at the 1988 Peace Race) won the points classification.

The points classification was calculated in another way: the first cyclists to finish in a stage received points, based on their rank and the type of stage. Flat stages awarded the winner 35 points, down to one point for 25th place. On medium mountain stages, 25 points were given to the winner, down to one point for 20th place. On a mountainous stage, the first rider across the finish received 20 points, down to one point for 15th place. In time trials, 15 points were given to the winner, down to one point for tenth place. All stages, except time trials, also had one or more intermediate sprints, where some points could be won. All road stages included two intermediate sprints, except for stage 5 with eight sprints. The first three riders across the intermediate sprint line received 6, 4, and 2 points respectively. The cyclist with the most points led the classification, and was identified with a green jersey. Olaf Ludwig won the classification with 256 points, 35 points ahead of Museeuw. The intermediate sprints classification, held until the year before, was abandoned for 1990.

Additionally, there was the mountains classification. The organisation ranked climbs by difficulty, with the hardest ascents rated hors catégorie and the easiest as fourth category. Points for this classification were won by the cyclists that reached the top of these climbs first. An hors catégorie climb gave the first rider across 40 points, down to one point for 15th place. First-category mountains awarded 30 points for the first rider, with second-, third-, and fourth-category giving out 20, 10, and 5 points respectively to the first across the summit. The cyclist with the most points led the classification, and wore a white jersey with red polka dots. Thierry Claveyrolat won the classification with 321 points, while Chiappucci placed second on 179 points.

There was also the young rider classification. This was decided the same way as the general classification, but only riders born after 1 January 1966 were eligible. Until 1988, the leader of this classification had worn a white jersey, while in 1989, the leader was highlighted by wearing the logo of the European Union on his shoulder. Both were not used in the 1990 Tour. Gilles Delion won the classification, finishing in 15th place on the general classification.

The 1989 Tour had included the combination classification, which was also no longer run. Both the intermediate sprint as well as the combination classification were scrapped to allow for more prize money to be paid out to the other classifications, a move instigated by new race director Jean-Marie Leblanc, who had taken over the position in late 1988. The 1990 Tour was the first run completely under his control.

For the team classification, the times of the best three cyclists per team on each stage were added; the leading team was the team with the lowest total time. The riders in the team that led this classification wore yellow caps. Z–Tomasso won the classification, just 16 seconds ahead of ONCE.

In addition, there was a combativity award given after each mass-start stage to the cyclist considered the most combative. The decision was made by a jury composed of journalists who gave points. The cyclist with the most points from votes in all stages led the combativity classification. Eduardo Chozas won this classification, and was given overall the super-combativity award. The Souvenir Henri Desgrange was given in honour of Tour founder Henri Desgrange to the first rider to pass the summit of the Col du Tourmalet on stage 16. This prize was won by Miguel Ángel Martínez Torres.

The Tour de France paid out F10,073,450 as prize money in total, two million of which went to the winner of the general classification (about $363,000 or £200,000 at the time). The prizes were mainly raised by the fees paid by departure and arrival cities along the course of the race. 550,000 francs had to be paid to host both the start and finish of a stage, with 300,000 francs asked for just one of the two. $75,000 each came from the entry fees paid by the teams to compete. Eventually, Z–Tomasso received the biggest share of prize money, £248,480, ahead of Carrera Jeans–Vagabond's £115,830. Last in the list was Seur, who gathered only £2,207. The overall budget of the Tour was around £10,000,000.

Classification leadership by stage
Stage	Winner	General classification	Points classification	Mountains classification	Young rider classification (Note: A white jersey was not awarded to the leader of the young rider classification between 1989 and 1999.)	Team classification	Combativity	
Stage	Winner	General classification	Points classification	Mountains classification	Young rider classification	Team classification	Award	Classification
P	Thierry Marie	Thierry Marie	Thierry Marie	no award	Viatcheslav Ekimov	PDM–Concorde–Ultima	no award	
1	Frans Maassen	Steve Bauer	Frans Maassen	Claudio Chiappucci	Viatcheslav Ekimov	Buckler–Colnago–Decca	Steve Bauer	Steve Bauer
2	Panasonic–Sportlife	Steve Bauer	Frans Maassen	Claudio Chiappucci	Viatcheslav Ekimov	Z–Tomasso	no award	Steve Bauer
3	Moreno Argentin	Steve Bauer	Olaf Ludwig	Claudio Chiappucci	Viatcheslav Ekimov	Z–Tomasso	Moreno Argentin	Moreno Argentin
4	Johan Museeuw	Steve Bauer	Olaf Ludwig	Claudio Chiappucci	Viatcheslav Ekimov	Z–Tomasso	Søren Lilholt	Søren Lilholt
5	Gerrit Solleveld	Steve Bauer	Olaf Ludwig	Claudio Chiappucci	Viatcheslav Ekimov	Buckler–Colnago–Decca	Gerrit Solleveld	Gerrit Solleveld
6	Jelle Nijdam	Steve Bauer	Olaf Ludwig	Dimitri Konyshev	Viatcheslav Ekimov	Buckler–Colnago–Decca	Jesper Skibby	Søren Lilholt
7	Raúl Alcalá	Steve Bauer	Olaf Ludwig	Dimitri Konyshev	Viatcheslav Ekimov	Buckler–Colnago–Decca	no award	Søren Lilholt
8	Olaf Ludwig	Steve Bauer	Olaf Ludwig	Dimitri Konyshev	Viatcheslav Ekimov	Buckler–Colnago–Decca	Michel Vermote	Michel Vermote
9	Massimo Ghirotto	Steve Bauer	Olaf Ludwig	Dimitri Konyshev	Viatcheslav Ekimov	Buckler–Colnago–Decca	Eduardo Chozas	Michel Vermote
10	Thierry Claveyrolat	Ronan Pensec	Olaf Ludwig	Thierry Claveyrolat	Gilles Delion	Z–Tomasso	Thierry Claveyrolat	Michel Vermote
11	Gianni Bugno	Ronan Pensec	Olaf Ludwig	Thierry Claveyrolat	Gilles Delion	Z–Tomasso	Thierry Claveyrolat	Thierry Claveyrolat
12	Erik Breukink	Claudio Chiappucci	Olaf Ludwig	Thierry Claveyrolat	Gilles Delion	Z–Tomasso	no award	Thierry Claveyrolat
13	Eduardo Chozas	Claudio Chiappucci	Olaf Ludwig	Thierry Claveyrolat	Gilles Delion	Z–Tomasso	Greg LeMond	Thierry Claveyrolat
14	Marino Lejarreta	Claudio Chiappucci	Olaf Ludwig	Thierry Claveyrolat	Gilles Delion	Z–Tomasso	Jean-Claude Bagot	Thierry Claveyrolat
15	Charly Mottet	Claudio Chiappucci	Olaf Ludwig	Thierry Claveyrolat	Gilles Delion	Z–Tomasso	Charly Mottet	Eduardo Chozas
16	Miguel Induráin	Claudio Chiappucci	Olaf Ludwig	Thierry Claveyrolat	Gilles Delion	Z–Tomasso	Claudio Chiappucci	Eduardo Chozas
17	Dmitri Konychev	Claudio Chiappucci	Olaf Ludwig	Thierry Claveyrolat	Gilles Delion	Z–Tomasso	Óscar Vargas	Eduardo Chozas
18	Gianni Bugno	Claudio Chiappucci	Olaf Ludwig	Thierry Claveyrolat	Gilles Delion	Z–Tomasso	Phil Anderson	Eduardo Chozas
19	Guido Bontempi	Claudio Chiappucci	Olaf Ludwig	Thierry Claveyrolat	Gilles Delion	Z–Tomasso	Guido Bontempi	Eduardo Chozas
20	Erik Breukink	Greg LeMond	Olaf Ludwig	Thierry Claveyrolat	Gilles Delion	Z–Tomasso	no award	Eduardo Chozas
21	Johan Museeuw	Greg LeMond	Olaf Ludwig	Thierry Claveyrolat	Gilles Delion	Z–Tomasso	Thomas Wegmüller	Eduardo Chozas
Final		Greg LeMond	Olaf Ludwig	Thierry Claveyrolat	Gilles Delion	Z–Tomasso	Eduardo Chozas	

== Final standings ==
Legend
A yellow jersey.	Denotes the winner of the general classification	A green jersey.	Denotes the winner of the points classification
A white jersey with red polka dots.	Denotes the winner of the mountains classification		

=== General classification ===
Final general classification (1–10)
Rank	Rider	Team	Time
1	Greg LeMond (USA)	Z–Tomasso	90h 43' 20"
2	Claudio Chiappucci (ITA)	Carrera Jeans–Vagabond	+ 2' 16"
3	Erik Breukink (NED)	PDM–Concorde–Ultima	+ 2' 29"
4	Pedro Delgado (ESP)	Banesto	+ 5' 01"
5	Marino Lejarreta (ESP)	ONCE	+ 5' 05"
6	Eduardo Chozas (ESP)	ONCE	+ 9' 14"
7	Gianni Bugno (ITA)	Chateau d'Ax–Salotti	+ 9' 39"
8	Raúl Alcalá (MEX)	PDM–Concorde–Ultima	+ 11' 14"
9	Claude Criquielion (BEL)	Lotto–Superclub	+ 12' 04"
10	Miguel Induráin (ESP)	Banesto	+ 12' 47"

Final general classification (11–156)
Rank	Rider	Team	Time
11	Andrew Hampsten (USA)	7-Eleven	+ 12' 54"
12	Pello Ruiz (ESP)	ONCE	+ 13' 39"
13	Fabio Parra (COL)	Kelme–Ibexpress	+ 14' 35"
14	Fabrice Philipot (FRA)	Castorama	+ 15' 49"
15	Gilles Delion (FRA)	Helvetia–La Suisse	+ 16' 57"
16	William Palacio (COL)	Postobón–Manzana–Ryalcao	+ 19' 43"
17	Johan Bruyneel (BEL)	Lotto–Superclub	+ 20' 24"
18	Roberto Conti (ITA)	Ariostea	+ 20' 43"
19	Éric Boyer (FRA)	Z–Tomasso	+ 22' 09"
20	Ronan Pensec (FRA)	Z–Tomasso	+ 22' 54"
21	Thierry Claveyrolat (FRA)	RMO	+ 23' 33"
22	Jérôme Simon (FRA)	Z–Tomasso	+ 27' 23"
23	Pascal Lino (FRA)	RMO	+ 30' 38"
24	Anselmo Fuerte (ESP)	ONCE	+ 31' 18"
25	Dmitri Konychev (URS)	Alfa Lum	+ 31' 21"
26	Atle Kvålsvoll (NOR)	Z–Tomasso	+ 32' 03"
27	Steve Bauer (CAN)	7-Eleven	+ 34' 05"
28	Abelardo Rondon (COL)	Banesto	+ 35' 37"
29	Miguel Ángel Martínez (ESP)	ONCE	+ 38' 39"
30	Sean Kelly (IRE)	PDM–Concorde–Ultima	+ 38' 42"
31	Jörg Müller (SUI)	TVM	+ 39' 50"
32	Nelson Rodríguez (COL)	Kelme–Ibexpress	+ 39' 56"
33	Steven Rooks (NED)	Panasonic–Sportlife	+ 42' 09"
34	Stephen Hodge (AUS)	ONCE	+ 44' 22"
35	Pascal Simon (FRA)	Castorama	+ 45' 47"
36	Patrick Robeet (BEL)	Weinmann–SMM–Uster	+ 46' 59"
37	Reynel Montoya (COL)	Postobón–Manzana–Ryalcao	+ 50' 16"
38	Óscar Vargas (COL)	Postobón–Manzana–Ryalcao	+ 52' 11"
39	Bruno Cornillet (FRA)	Z–Tomasso	+ 53' 00"
40	Gerardo Moncada (COL)	Postobón–Manzana–Ryalcao	+ 53' 36"
41	Jesús Rodríguez (ESP)	Banesto	+ 53' 44"
42	Beat Breu (SUI)	Weinmann–SMM–Uster	+ 59' 13"
43	Rudy Dhaenens (BEL)	PDM–Concorde–Ultima	+ 59' 51"
44	Stephen Roche (IRE)	Histor–Sigma	+ 1h 00' 07"
45	Piotr Ugrumov (URS)	Alfa Lum	+ 1h 01' 42"
46	Omar Pablo Hernandez (COL)	Postobón–Manzana–Ryalcao	+ 1h 02' 46"
47	Philippe Louviot (FRA)	Toshiba	+ 1h 03' 18"
48	Alvaro Mejia (COL)	Postobón–Manzana–Ryalcao	+ 1h 05' 04"
49	Charly Mottet (FRA)	RMO	+ 1h 06' 57"
50	Jean-Claude Colotti (FRA)	RMO	+ 1h 08' 31"
51	Pascal Lance (FRA)	Toshiba	+ 1h 09' 37"
52	Jean-Claude Bagot (FRA)	RMO	+ 1h 10' 21"
53	Carlos Jaramillo (COL)	Postobón–Manzana–Ryalcao	+ 1h 10' 47"
54	Guy Nulens (BEL)	Panasonic–Sportlife	+ 1h 10' 53"
55	Viatcheslav Ekimov (URS)	Panasonic–Sportlife	+ 1h 14' 32"
56	Dag Otto Lauritzen (NOR)	7-Eleven	+ 1h 15' 25"
57	Toni Rominger (SUI)	Chateau d'Ax–Salotti	+ 1h 15' 51"
58	Michel Dernies (BEL)	Weinmann–SMM–Uster	+ 1h 17' 44"
59	Dominique Arnaud (FRA)	Banesto	+ 1h 18' 28"
60	Brian Holm (DEN)	Histor–Sigma	+ 1h 20' 54"
61	Mauro Gianetti (SUI)	Helvetia–La Suisse	+ 1h 21' 06"
62	Marc Sergeant (BEL)	Panasonic–Sportlife	+ 1h 21' 26"
63	Vicente-Juan Ridaura (ESP)	Seur	+ 1h 21' 38"
64	Frans Maassen (NED)	Buckler–Colnago–Decca	+ 1h 22' 14"
65	Gilbert Duclos-Lassalle (FRA)	Z–Tomasso	+ 1h 22' 34"
66	Maarten Ducrot (NED)	TVM	+ 1h 23' 38"
67	Gerrit de Vries (NED)	Buckler–Colnago–Decca	+ 1h 23' 54"
68	Jos Haex (BEL)	Lotto–Superclub	+ 1h 25' 04"
69	Alessandro Giannelli (ITA)	Carrera Jeans–Vagabond	+ 1h 25' 12"
70	William Pulido (COL)	Postobón–Manzana–Ryalcao	+ 1h 29' 36"
71	Phil Anderson (AUS)	TVM	+ 1h 30' 01"
72	Alberto Elli (ITA)	Ariostea	+ 1h 30' 40"
73	Luc Leblanc (FRA)	Castorama	+ 1h 31' 13"
74	Alberto Volpi (ITA)	Chateau d'Ax–Salotti	+ 1h 31' 19"
75	Marcello Siboni (ITA)	Ariostea	+ 1h 33' 12"
76	Roberto Gusmeroli (ITA)	Chateau d'Ax–Salotti	+ 1h 33' 16"
77	Denis Roux (FRA)	Toshiba	+ 1h 33' 30"
78	Melcior Mauri (ESP)	ONCE	+ 1h 33' 40"
79	Juan Carlos Castillo (COL)	Postobón–Manzana–Ryalcao	+ 1h 34' 19"
80	Davide Cassani (ITA)	Ariostea	+ 1h 34' 21"
81	Johan Museeuw (BEL)	Lotto–Superclub	+ 1h 35' 10"
82	Laurent Biondi (FRA)	Histor–Sigma	+ 1h 35' 49"
83	Ron Kiefel (USA)	7-Eleven	+ 1h 39' 11"
84	Roland Le Clerc (FRA)	Toshiba	+ 1h 39' 28"
85	Søren Lilholt (DEN)	Histor–Sigma	+ 1h 40' 11"
86	Nestor Oswaldo Mora (COL)	Kelme–Ibexpress	+ 1h 40' 50"
87	Uwe Raab (DDR)	PDM–Concorde–Ultima	+ 1h 41' 05"
88	Mario Kummer (DDR)	Chateau d'Ax–Salotti	+ 1h 42' 38"
89	José Urea (ESP)	Seur	+ 1h 42' 53"
90	Herminio Diaz (ESP)	ONCE	+ 1h 43' 18"
91	Frédéric Brun (FRA)	RMO	+ 1h 43' 52"
92	José-Luis Rodriguez (ESP)	Seur	+ 1h 44' 16"
93	Peter Roes (BEL)	Lotto–Superclub	+ 1h 45' 22"
94	Kurt Steinmann (SUI)	Weinmann–SMM–Uster	+ 1h 45' 44"
95	Massimo Ghirotto (ITA)	Carrera Jeans–Vagabond	+ 1h 46' 57"
96	Marino Alonso (ESP)	Banesto	+ 1h 47' 19"
97	Willem Van Eynde (BEL)	Lotto–Superclub	+ 1h 47' 48"
98	Juan Martinéz (ESP)	Banesto	+ 1h 48' 34"
99	Giancarlo Perini (ITA)	Carrera Jeans–Vagabond	+ 1h 49' 17"
100	Eric Van Lancker (BEL)	Panasonic–Sportlife	+ 1h 50' 11"
101	Edwig Van Hooydonck (BEL)	Buckler–Colnago–Decca	+ 1h 53' 05"
102	Bruno Cenghialta (ITA)	Ariostea	+ 1h 53' 46"
103	Laurent Pillon (FRA)	Histor–Sigma	+ 1h 53' 58"
104	François Lemarchand (FRA)	Z–Tomasso	+ 1h 54' 12"
105	Jan Schur (DDR)	Chateau d'Ax–Salotti	+ 1h 54' 13"
106	Paul Haghedooren (BEL)	Histor–Sigma	+ 1h 54' 29"
107	Thierry Laurent (FRA)	RMO	+ 1h 55' 43"
108	Acácio da Silva (POR)	Carrera Jeans–Vagabond	+ 1h 56' 25"
109	Valerio Piva (ITA)	Ariostea	+ 1h 57' 31"
110	Carlo Bomans (BEL)	Weinmann–SMM–Uster	+ 1h 58' 24"
111	Adri van der Poel (NED)	Weinmann–SMM–Uster	+ 1h 58' 31"
112	Thomas Wegmüller (SUI)	Weinmann–SMM–Uster	+ 1h 59' 03"
113	Henri Manders (NED)	Helvetia–La Suisse	+ 1h 59' 15"
114	Jan Goessens (BEL)	Weinmann–SMM–Uster	+ 2h 01' 19"
115	Twan Poels (NED)	Buckler–Colnago–Decca	+ 2h 02' 28"
116	Andy Bishop (USA)	7-Eleven	+ 2h 03' 10"
117	Gerrit Solleveld (NED)	Buckler–Colnago–Decca	+ 2h 04' 50"
118	Giuseppe Calcaterra (ITA)	Chateau d'Ax–Salotti	+ 2h 04' 51"
119	Sean Yates (GBR)	7-Eleven	+ 2h 05' 43"
120	Wilfried Peeters (BEL)	Histor–Sigma	+ 2h 05' 43"
121	Thierry Marie (FRA)	Castorama	+ 2h 06' 58"
122	Guido Bontempi (ITA)	Carrera Jeans–Vagabond	+ 2h 08' 05"
123	Patrick Tolhoek (NED)	Buckler–Colnago–Decca	+ 2h 08' 10"
124	Pablo Moreno (ESP)	Seur	+ 2h 08' 58"
125	Jos van Aert (NED)	PDM–Concorde–Ultima	+ 2h 09' 31"
126	Alexandre Trubine (URS)	Alfa Lum	+ 2h 11' 01"
127	Jelle Nijdam (NED)	Buckler–Colnago–Decca	+ 2h 11' 12"
128	Martin Schalkers (NED)	TVM	+ 2h 12' 32"
129	Patrick Verschueren (BEL)	Lotto–Superclub	+ 2h 13' 06"
130	Erich Mächler (SUI)	Carrera Jeans–Vagabond	+ 2h 13' 58"
131	Mauro-Antonio Santaromita (ITA)	Chateau d'Ax–Salotti	+ 2h 14' 45"
132	Bob Roll (USA)	7-Eleven	+ 2h 14' 50"
133	Vincent Barteau (FRA)	Castorama	+ 2h 17' 41"
134	Adriano Baffi (ITA)	Ariostea	+ 2h 18' 39"
135	Jose-Ángel Sarrapio (ESP)	Kelme–Ibexpress	+ 2h 20' 22"
136	Andreas Kappes (FRG)	Toshiba	+ 2h 20' 55"
137	Peter De Clercq (BEL)	Lotto–Superclub	+ 2h 21' 26"
138	Antonio Miguel Diaz (ESP)	Kelme–Ibexpress	+ 2h 22' 37"
139	Jean-Claude Leclercq (FRA)	Helvetia–La Suisse	+ 2h 23' 36"
140	Gert Jakobs (NED)	PDM–Concorde–Ultima	+ 2h 24' 04"
141	Olaf Ludwig (DDR)	Panasonic–Sportlife	+ 2h 26' 33"
142	Norman Alvis (USA)	7-Eleven	+ 2h 26' 41"
143	Jan Siemons (NED)	TVM	+ 2h 27' 30"
144	Michel Vermote (BEL)	RMO	+ 2h 32' 12"
145	Djamolidine Abduzhaparov (UZB)	Alfa Lum	+ 2h 32' 48"
146	Jean-Paul van Poppel (NED)	Panasonic–Sportlife	+ 2h 34' 55"
147	Giovanni Fidanza (ITA)	Chateau d'Ax–Salotti	+ 2h 35' 11"
148	Vassili Zhdanov (UKR)	Alfa Lum	+ 2h 42' 53"
149	Christian Chaubet (FRA)	Toshiba	+ 2h 43' 40"
150	Hendrik Redant (BEL)	Lotto–Superclub	+ 2h 47' 53"
151	Nikolai Golovatenko (URS)	Alfa Lum	+ 2h 49' 08"
152	Jesús Rosado (ESP)	Kelme–Ibexpress	+ 2h 56' 11"
153	Davis Phinney (USA)	7-Eleven	+ 2h 59' 29"
154	Maximilian Sciandri (GBR)	Carrera Jeans–Vagabond	+ 3h 00' 11"
155	Antonio Espejo (ESP)	Kelme–Ibexpress	+ 3h 13' 27"
156	Rodolfo Massi (ITA)	Ariostea	+ 3h 16' 26"

=== Points classification ===
Final points classification (1–10)
Rank	Rider	Team	Points
1	Olaf Ludwig (DDR)	Panasonic–Sportlife	256
2	Johan Museeuw (BEL)	Lotto–Superclub	221
3	Erik Breukink (NED)	PDM–Concorde–Ultima	118
4	Jean-Claude Colotti (FRA)	RMO	117
5	Sean Kelly (IRE)	PDM–Concorde–Ultima	116
6	Greg LeMond (USA)	Z–Tomasso	108
7	Giovanni Fidanza (ITA)	Chateau d'Ax–Salotti	108
8	Adriano Baffi (ITA)	Ariostea	107
9	Adri van der Poel (NED)	Weinmann–SMM–Uster	105
10	Davis Phinney (USA)	7-Eleven	87

=== Mountains classification ===
Final mountains classification (1–10)
Rank	Rider	Team	Points
1	Thierry Claveyrolat (FRA)	RMO	321
2	Claudio Chiappucci (ITA)	Carrera Jeans–Vagabond	179
3	Roberto Conti (ITA)	Ariostea	160
4	Miguel Induráin (ESP)	Banesto	153
5	Greg LeMond (USA)	Z–Tomasso	135
6	Johan Bruyneel (BEL)	Lotto–Superclub	124
7	Dmitri Konychev (URS)	Alfa Lum	118
8	Reynel Montoya (COL)	Postobón–Manzana–Ryalcao	105
9	Marino Lejarreta (ESP)	ONCE	94
10	Eduardo Chozas (ESP)	ONCE	90

=== Young rider classification ===
Final young rider classification (1–10)
Rank	Rider	Team	Time
1	Gilles Delion (FRA)	Helvetia–La Suisse	91h 00' 17"
2	Pascal Lino (FRA)	RMO	+ 13' 41"
3	Dmitri Konychev (URS)	Alfa Lum	+ 14' 14"
4	Miguel Ángel Martínez (ESP)	ONCE	+ 21' 42"
5	Alvaro Mejia (COL)	Postobón–Manzana–Ryalcao	+ 48' 07"
6	Viatcheslav Ekimov (URS)	Panasonic–Sportlife	+ 57' 35"
7	Gerrit de Vries (NED)	Buckler–Colnago–Decca	+ 1h 06' 57"
8	Luc Leblanc (FRA)	Castorama	+ 1h 14' 16"
9	Roberto Gusmeroli (ITA)	Chateau d'Ax–Salotti	+ 1h 16' 10"
10	Melcior Mauri (ESP)	ONCE	+ 1h 16' 43"

=== Team classification ===
Final team classification (1–10)
Rank	Team	Time
1	Z–Tomasso	272h 21' 21"
2	ONCE	+ 16"
3	Banesto	+ 23' 44"
4	PDM–Concorde–Ultima	+ 33' 05"
5	RMO	+ 56' 31"
6	Postobón–Manzana–Ryalcao	+ 1h 09' 36"
7	Lotto–Superclub	+ 1h 15' 09"
8	Castorama	+ 1h 43' 47"
9	7-Eleven	+ 1h 48' 31"
10	Helvetia–La Suisse	+ 2h 02' 30"

=== Combativity classification ===
Final combativity classification (1–10)
Rank	Rider	Team	Points
1	Eduardo Chozas (ESP)	ONCE	37
2	Thierry Claveyrolat (FRA)	RMO	30
3	Dmitri Konychev (URS)	Alfa Lum	27
4	Claudio Chiappucci (ITA)	Carrera Jeans–Vagabond	24
5	Jean-Claude Colotti (FRA)	RMO	23
6	Charly Mottet (FRA)	RMO	22
7	Michel Vermote (BEL)	RMO	21
8	Greg LeMond (USA)	Z–Tomasso	19
9	Søren Lilholt (DEN)	Histor–Sigma	19
10	Phil Anderson (AUS)	TVM	17

== Doping and penalties ==
No rider tested positive for performance-enhancing drugs during doping tests at the 1990 Tour. Eric Vanderaerden (Buckler–Colnago–Decca) was expelled from the race on stage 11 for repeatedly holding on to the doors of team cars during the ascent to Alpe d'Huez.

== Bibliography ==
- Abt, Samuel (1990). LeMond: The Incredible Comeback. London: Stanley Paul. ISBN 978-0-09-174874-6.
- Abt, Samuel (1991). Tour de France: Three Weeks to Glory. Mill Valley, California: Bicycle Books. ISBN 978-0-933201-39-2.
- Abt, Samuel (2013), "'Look How Big It's Become'", in Bacon, Ellis; Birnie, Lionel (eds.), The Cycling Anthology, vol. 2, St Albans: Peloton Publishing, pp. 8–17, ISBN 978-0-9567814-5-1
- Andrews, Guy (2016). Greg Lemond: Yellow Jersey Racer. London: Bloomsbury Publishing. ISBN 978-1-4729-4355-2.
- Augendre, Jacques (2016). Guide historique [Historical guide] (PDF) (in French). Paris: Amaury Sport Organisation. Archived (PDF) from the original on 17 August 2016.
- Bacon, Ellis (2014). Mapping Le Tour. Updated History and Route Map of Every Tour de France Race. Glasgow, UK: HarperCollins. ISBN 978-0-00-754399-1.
- de Visé, Daniel (2019). The Comeback: Greg LeMond, the True King of American Cycling, and a Legendary Tour de France. New York City: Grove Press. ISBN 978-0-8021-4718-9.
- Fife, Graeme (2000). Tour de France: The History, the Legend, the Riders. Edinburgh: Mainstream Publishing. ISBN 978-1-84018-284-2.
- Fignon, Laurent (2010). We Were Young and Carefree. London: Yellow Jersey Press. ISBN 978-0-22408-319-5.
- Fotheringham, Alasdair (2017). Indurain: Relentless. London: Penguin Books. ISBN 978-1-78503-205-9.
- Heijmans, Jeroen; Mallon, Bill, eds. (2011). Historical Dictionary of Cycling. Lanham: The Scarecrow Press. ISBN 978-0-8108-7175-5.
- Martin, Pierre (1990). Tour 90: The 1990 Tour of Italy and Tour de France. With contributions from: Penazzo, Sergio; Baratino, Dante; Schamps, Daniel; Vos, Cor. Keighley, UK: Kennedy Brothers Publishing. OCLC 24697961.
- McGann, Bill; McGann, Carol (2008). The Story of the Tour de France: 1965–2007. Vol. 2. Indianapolis: Dog Ear Publishing. ISBN 978-1-59858-608-4.
- Nauright, John; Parrish, Charles (2012). Sports Around the World: History, Culture, and Practice. Vol. 2. Santa Barbara, California: ABC–CLIO. ISBN 978-1-59884-300-2.
- Nicholson, Geoffrey (1991). Le Tour: The Rise and Rise of the Tour de France. Dunton Green, UK: Hodder & Stoughton. ISBN 978-0-340-54268-2.
- Ryan, Barry (2018). The Ascent: Sean Kelly, Stephen Roche and the Rise of Irish Cycling's Golden Generation. Dublin: Gill Books. ISBN 978-07171-8153-7.
- Smith, Martin, ed. (2009). The Telegraph Book of the Tour de France. London: Aurum Press. ISBN 978-1-84513-545-4.
- van den Akker, Pieter (2018). Tour de France Rules and Statistics: 1903–2018. Self-published. ISBN 978-1-79398-080-9.
- Vespini, Jean-Paul (2008). The Tour is Won on the Alpe: Alpe d'Huez and the Classic Battles of the Tour de France. Boulder, Colorado: Velo Press. ISBN 978-1-934030-23-3.
- Wheatcroft, Geoffrey (2013). Le Tour: A History of the Tour de France. London: Simon & Schuster. ISBN 978-1-4711-2894-3.
