= 1990 Tour de France, Stage 11 to Stage 21 =

Cycling race stages

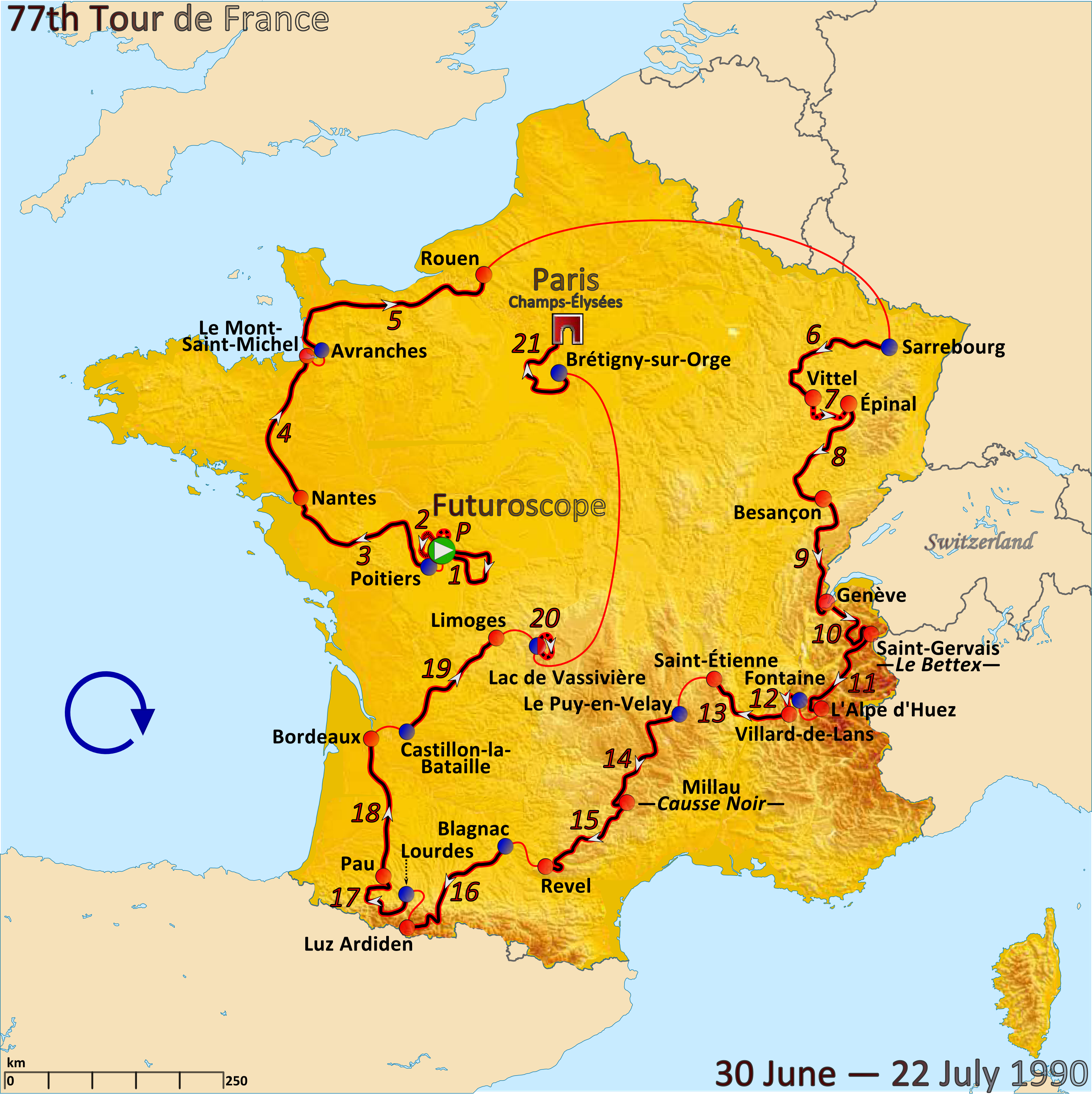
Route of the 1990 Tour de France

The 1990 Tour de France was the 77th edition of Tour de France, one of cycling's Grand Tours. The Tour began in Futuroscope with a prologue individual time trial on 30 June and Stage 10 occurred on 10 July with a mountain stage to Saint-Gervais. The race finished on the Champs-Élysées in Paris on 22 July.

== Stage 11 ==
11 July 1990 — Saint-Gervais to Alpe d'Huez, 182.5 km (113.4 mi)

Stage 11 result

Rank	Rider	Team	Time
1	Gianni Bugno (ITA)	Chateau d'Ax	5h 37' 51"
2	Greg LeMond (USA)	Z–Tomasso	s.t.
3	Erik Breukink (NED)	PDM–Concorde	+ 1"
4	Thierry Claveyrolat (FRA)	RMO–Mavic–Liberia	+ 4"
5	Fabio Parra (COL)	Kelme–Ibexpress	+ 6"
6	Abelardo Rondón (COL)	Banesto	+ 40"
7	Andrew Hampsten (USA)	7-Eleven–Hoonved	s.t.
8	Pedro Delgado (ESP)	Banesto	s.t.
9	Claude Criquielion (BEL)	Lotto–Superclub	+ 47"
10	Ronan Pensec (FRA)	Z–Tomasso	+ 48"

General classification after stage 11

Rank	Rider	Team	Time
1	Ronan Pensec (FRA)	Z–Tomasso	48h 24' 43"
2	Claudio Chiappucci (ITA)	Carrera Jeans–Vagabond	+ 1' 28"
3	Greg LeMond (USA)	Z–Tomasso	+ 9' 04"
4	Erik Breukink (NED)	PDM–Concorde	+ 9' 28"
5	Gianni Bugno (ITA)	Chateau d'Ax	+ 10' 39"
6	Pedro Delgado (ESP)	Banesto	+ 11' 05"
7	Claude Criquielion (BEL)	Lotto–Superclub	+ 11' 29"
8	Raúl Alcalá (MEX)	PDM–Concorde	+ 11' 55"
9	Andrew Hampsten (USA)	7-Eleven–Hoonved	+ 13' 45"
10	Fabrice Philipot (FRA)	Castorama–Raleigh	+ 13' 49"

== Stage 12 ==
12 July 1990 — Fontaine to Villard-de-Lans, 33.5 km (20.8 mi) (individual time trial)

Stage 12 result

Rank	Rider	Team	Time
1	Erik Breukink (NED)	PDM–Concorde	56' 52"
2	Pedro Delgado (ESP)	Banesto	+ 30"
3	Miguel Induráin (ESP)	Banesto	+ 43"
4	Marino Lejarreta (ESP)	ONCE	+ 54"
5	Greg LeMond (USA)	Z–Tomasso	+ 56"
6	Fabio Parra (COL)	Kelme–Ibexpress	+ 58"
7	William Palacio (COL)	Ryalcao–Postobón	+ 59"
8	Claudio Chiappucci (ITA)	Carrera Jeans–Vagabond	+ 1' 05"
9	Johan Bruyneel (BEL)	Lotto–Superclub	+ 1' 17"
10	Reynel Montoya (COL)	Ryalcao–Postobón	s.t.

General classification after stage 12

Rank	Rider	Team	Time
1	Claudio Chiappucci (ITA)	Carrera Jeans–Vagabond	49h 24' 08"
2	Ronan Pensec (FRA)	Z–Tomasso	+ 1' 17"
3	Erik Breukink (NED)	PDM–Concorde	+ 6' 55"
4	Greg LeMond (USA)	Z–Tomasso	+ 7' 27"
5	Pedro Delgado (ESP)	Banesto	+ 9' 02"
6	Raúl Alcalá (MEX)	PDM–Concorde	+ 10' 44"
7	Gianni Bugno (ITA)	Chateau d'Ax	+ 10' 48"
8	Claude Criquielion (BEL)	Lotto–Superclub	+ 11' 23"
9	Marino Lejarreta (ESP)	ONCE	+ 12' 46"
10	Andrew Hampsten (USA)	7-Eleven–Hoonved	+ 13' 58"

== Stage 13 ==
14 July 1990 — Villard-de-Lans to Saint-Étienne, 149.0 km (92.6 mi)

Stage 13 result

Rank	Rider	Team	Time
1	Eduardo Chozas (ESP)	ONCE	3h 20' 12"
2	Erik Breukink (NED)	PDM–Concorde	s.t.
3	Andrew Hampsten (USA)	7-Eleven–Hoonved	s.t.
4	Roberto Conti (ITA)	Ariostea	s.t.
5	Greg LeMond (USA)	Z–Tomasso	s.t.
6	Marino Lejarreta (ESP)	ONCE	+ 30"
7	Pedro Delgado (ESP)	Banesto	s.t.
8	Gianni Bugno (ITA)	Chateau d'Ax	s.t.
9	Miguel Induráin (ESP)	Banesto	+ 36"
10	Dimitri Konyshev (URS)	Alfa Lum	+ 3' 08"

General classification after stage 13

Rank	Rider	Team	Time
1	Claudio Chiappucci (ITA)	Carrera Jeans–Vagabond	52h 49' 13"
2	Erik Breukink (NED)	PDM–Concorde	+ 2' 02"
3	Greg LeMond (USA)	Z–Tomasso	+ 2' 34"
4	Ronan Pensec (FRA)	Z–Tomasso	+ 4' 11"
5	Pedro Delgado (ESP)	Banesto	+ 4' 39"
6	Gianni Bugno (ITA)	Chateau d'Ax	+ 6' 25"
7	Marino Lejarreta (ESP)	ONCE	+ 8' 23"
8	Raúl Alcalá (MEX)	PDM–Concorde	+ 9' 00"
9	Andrew Hampsten (USA)	7-Eleven–Hoonved	+ 9' 05"
10	Claude Criquielion (BEL)	Lotto–Superclub	+ 9' 39"

== Stage 14 ==
15 July 1990 — Le Puy-en-Velay to Millau, 205.0 km (127.4 mi)

Stage 14 result

Rank	Rider	Team	Time
1	Marino Lejarreta (ESP)	ONCE	5h 12' 03"
2	Miguel Induráin (ESP)	Banesto	+ 24"
3	Gianni Bugno (ITA)	Chateau d'Ax	+ 25"
4	Raúl Alcalá (MEX)	PDM–Concorde	+ 33"
5	Greg LeMond (USA)	Z–Tomasso	+ 34"
6	Erik Breukink (NED)	PDM–Concorde	s.t.
7	Pedro Delgado (ESP)	Banesto	s.t.
8	Claude Criquielion (BEL)	Lotto Soudal	s.t.
9	William Palacio (COL)	Ryalcao–Postobón	s.t.
10	Gilles Delion (FRA)	Helvetia–La Suisse	s.t.

General classification after stage 14

Rank	Rider	Team	Time
1	Claudio Chiappucci (ITA)	Carrera Jeans–Vagabond	58h 02' 03"
2	Erik Breukink (NED)	PDM–Concorde	+ 1' 49"
3	Greg LeMond (USA)	Z–Tomasso	+ 2' 21"
4	Pedro Delgado (ESP)	Banesto	+ 4' 26"
5	Ronan Pensec (FRA)	Z–Tomasso	+ 4' 55"
6	Gianni Bugno (ITA)	Chateau d'Ax	+ 6' 03"
7	Marino Lejarreta (ESP)	ONCE	+ 7' 36"
8	Raúl Alcalá (MEX)	PDM–Concorde	+ 8' 46"
9	Claude Criquielion (BEL)	Lotto–Superclub	+ 9' 26"
10	Andrew Hampsten (USA)	7-Eleven–Hoonved	+ 9' 43"

== Stage 15 ==
16 July 1990 — Millau to Revel, 170.0 km (105.6 mi)

Stage 15 result

Rank	Rider	Team	Time
1	Charly Mottet (FRA)	RMO–Mavic–Liberia	4h 13' 56"
2	Giuseppe Calcaterra (ITA)	Chateau d'Ax	+ 2' 02"
3	Viatcheslav Ekimov (URS)	Panasonic–Sportlife	s.t.
4	Edwig Van Hooydonck (BEL)	Buckler–Colnago–Decca	s.t.
5	Thierry Claveyrolat (FRA)	RMO–Mavic–Liberia	s.t.
6	Davide Cassani (ITA)	Ariostea	s.t.
7	Atle Kvålsvoll (NOR)	Z–Tomasso	s.t.
8	Luc Leblanc (FRA)	Castorama–Raleigh	s.t.
9	Óscar Vargas (COL)	Ryalcao–Postobón	s.t.
10	Bruno Cornillet (FRA)	Z–Tomasso	s.t.

General classification after stage 15

Rank	Rider	Team	Time
1	Claudio Chiappucci (ITA)	Carrera Jeans–Vagabond	62h 20' 47"
2	Erik Breukink (NED)	PDM–Concorde	+ 1' 52"
3	Greg LeMond (USA)	Z–Tomasso	+ 2' 24"
4	Pedro Delgado (ESP)	Banesto	+ 4' 29"
5	Ronan Pensec (FRA)	Z–Tomasso	+ 4' 58"
6	Gianni Bugno (ITA)	Chateau d'Ax	+ 6' 06"
7	Marino Lejarreta (ESP)	ONCE	+ 7' 39"
8	Eduardo Chozas (ESP)	ONCE	+ 8' 14"
9	Raúl Alcalá (MEX)	PDM–Concorde	+ 8' 49"
10	Claude Criquielion (BEL)	Lotto–Superclub	+ 9' 29"

== Stage 16 ==
17 July 1990 — Blagnac to Luz Ardiden, 215.0 km (133.6 mi)

Stage 16 result

Rank	Rider	Team	Time
1	Miguel Induráin (ESP)	Banesto	7h 04' 38"
2	Greg LeMond (USA)	Z–Tomasso	+ 6"
3	Marino Lejarreta (ESP)	ONCE	+ 15"
4	Miguel Martínez (ESP)	ONCE	+ 59"
5	Fabio Parra (COL)	Kelme–Ibexpress	+ 1' 18"
6	Roberto Conti (ITA)	Ariostea	+ 1' 24"
7	Claude Criquielion (BEL)	Lotto–Superclub	+ 1' 36"
8	Pedro Delgado (ESP)	Banesto	+ 1' 38"
9	Éric Boyer (FRA)	Z–Tomasso	s.t.
10	Gilles Delion (FRA)	Helvetia–La Suisse	+ 2' 00"

General classification after stage 16

Rank	Rider	Team	Time
1	Claudio Chiappucci (ITA)	Carrera Jeans–Vagabond	69h 27' 50"
2	Greg LeMond (USA)	Z–Tomasso	+ 5"
3	Pedro Delgado (ESP)	Banesto	+ 3' 42"
4	Erik Breukink (NED)	PDM–Concorde	+ 3' 49"
5	Marino Lejarreta (ESP)	ONCE	+ 5' 29"
6	Gianni Bugno (ITA)	Chateau d'Ax	+ 7' 48"
7	Eduardo Chozas (ESP)	ONCE	+ 7' 49"
8	Claude Criquielion (BEL)	Lotto–Superclub	+ 8' 40"
9	Andrew Hampsten (USA)	7-Eleven–Hoonved	+ 9' 34"
10	Ronan Pensec (FRA)	Z–Tomasso	+ 11' 12"

== Stage 17 ==
18 July 1990 — Lourdes to Pau, 150.0 km (93.2 mi)

Stage 17 result

Rank	Rider	Team	Time
1	Dimitri Konyshev (URS)	Alfa Lum	4h 08' 25"
2	Johan Bruyneel (BEL)	Lotto–Superclub	+ 1"
3	Steve Bauer (CAN)	7-Eleven–Hoonved	+ 11"
4	Jean-Claude Colotti (FRA)	RMO–Mavic–Liberia	+ 32"
5	Davide Cassani (ITA)	Ariostea	s.t.
6	Reynel Montoya (COL)	Ryalcao–Postobón	s.t.
7	Pascal Simon (FRA)	Castorama–Raleigh	+ 34"
8	Dominique Arnaud (FRA)	Banesto	+ 53"
9	Laurent Biondi (FRA)	Histor–Sigma	+ 2' 59"
10	Peter De Clercq (BEL)	Lotto–Superclub	+ 3' 38"

General classification after stage 17

Rank	Rider	Team	Time
1	Claudio Chiappucci (ITA)	Carrera Jeans–Vagabond	73h 41' 46"
2	Greg LeMond (USA)	Z–Tomasso	+ 5"
3	Pedro Delgado (ESP)	Banesto	+ 3' 42"
4	Erik Breukink (NED)	PDM–Concorde	+ 3' 49"
5	Marino Lejarreta (ESP)	ONCE	+ 5' 29"
6	Gianni Bugno (ITA)	Chateau d'Ax	+ 7' 48"
7	Eduardo Chozas (ESP)	ONCE	+ 7' 49"
8	Claude Criquielion (BEL)	Lotto–Superclub	+ 8' 40"
9	Andrew Hampsten (USA)	7-Eleven–Hoonved	+ 9' 34"
10	Fabio Parra (COL)	Kelme–Ibexpress	+ 11' 30"

== Stage 18 ==
19 July 1990 — Pau to Bordeaux, 202.0 km (125.5 mi)

Stage 18 result

Rank	Rider	Team	Time
1	Gianni Bugno (ITA)	Chateau d'Ax	5h 41' 33"
2	Erik Breukink (NED)	PDM–Concorde	+ 1"
3	Roberto Gusmeroli (ITA)	Chateau d'Ax	+ 3"
4	Giovanni Fidanza (ITA)	Chateau d'Ax	+ 19"
5	Adriano Baffi (ITA)	Ariostea	s.t.
6	Johan Museeuw (BEL)	Lotto–Superclub	s.t.
7	Djamolidine Abdoujaparov (URS)	Alfa Lum	s.t.
8	Olaf Ludwig (DDR)	Panasonic–Sportlife	s.t.
9	Adri van der Poel (NED)	Weinmann–SMM Uster	s.t.
10	Martin Schalkers (NED)	TVM	s.t.

General classification after stage 18

Rank	Rider	Team	Time
1	Claudio Chiappucci (ITA)	Carrera Jeans–Vagabond	79h 23' 38"
2	Greg LeMond (USA)	Z–Tomasso	+ 5"
3	Erik Breukink (NED)	PDM–Concorde	+ 3' 31"
4	Pedro Delgado (ESP)	Banesto	+ 3' 42"
5	Marino Lejarreta (ESP)	ONCE	+ 5' 29"
6	Gianni Bugno (ITA)	Chateau d'Ax	+ 7' 29"
7	Eduardo Chozas (ESP)	ONCE	+ 7' 49"
8	Claude Criquielion (BEL)	Lotto–Superclub	+ 8' 40"
9	Andrew Hampsten (USA)	7-Eleven–Hoonved	+ 9' 34"
10	Fabio Parra (COL)	Kelme–Ibexpress	+ 11' 30"

== Stage 19 ==
20 July 1990 — Castillon-la-Bataille to Limoges, 182.5 km (113.4 mi)

Stage 19 result

Rank	Rider	Team	Time
1	Guido Bontempi (ITA)	Carrera Jeans–Vagabond	5h 16' 04"
2	Dag Otto Lauritzen (NOR)	7-Eleven–Hoonved	+ 1' 28"
3	Peter Roes (BEL)	Lotto–Superclub	s.t.
4	Roberto Gusmeroli (ITA)	Chateau d'Ax	+ 1' 32"
5	Jelle Nijdam (NED)	Buckler–Colnago–Decca	+ 2' 06"
6	Adri van der Poel (NED)	Weinmann–SMM Uster	s.t.
7	Steve Bauer (CAN)	7-Eleven–Hoonved	s.t.
8	Andreas Kappes (FRG)	Toshiba	s.t.
9	Maarten Ducrot (NED)	TVM	+ 2' 15"
10	Edwig Van Hooydonck (BEL)	Buckler–Colnago–Decca	+ 2' 44"

General classification after stage 19

Rank	Rider	Team	Time
1	Claudio Chiappucci (ITA)	Carrera Jeans–Vagabond	84h 45' 46"
2	Greg LeMond (USA)	Z–Tomasso	+ 5"
3	Erik Breukink (NED)	PDM–Concorde	+ 3' 31"
4	Pedro Delgado (ESP)	Banesto	+ 3' 42"
5	Marino Lejarreta (ESP)	ONCE	+ 5' 29"
6	Gianni Bugno (ITA)	Chateau d'Ax	+ 7' 29"
7	Eduardo Chozas (ESP)	ONCE	+ 7' 49"
8	Claude Criquielion (BEL)	Lotto–Superclub	+ 8' 40"
9	Andrew Hampsten (USA)	7-Eleven–Hoonved	+ 9' 34"
10	Fabio Parra (COL)	Kelme–Ibexpress	+ 11' 30"

== Stage 20 ==
21 July 1990 — Lac de Vassivière to Lac de Vassivière, 45.5 km (28.3 mi) (individual time trial)

Stage 20 result

Rank	Rider	Team	Time
1	Erik Breukink (NED)	PDM–Concorde	1h 02' 40"
2	Raúl Alcalá (MEX)	PDM–Concorde	+ 28"
3	Marino Lejarreta (ESP)	ONCE	+ 38"
4	Miguel Induráin (ESP)	Banesto	+ 40"
5	Greg LeMond (USA)	Z–Tomasso	+ 57"
6	Pello Ruiz Cabestany (ESP)	ONCE	+ 1' 28"
7	Dag Otto Lauritzen (NOR)	7-Eleven–Hoonved	+ 2' 01"
8	Pedro Delgado (ESP)	Banesto	+ 2' 21"
9	Philippe Louviot (FRA)	Toshiba	+ 2' 26"
10	Luc Leblanc (FRA)	Castorama–Raleigh	+ 2' 27"

General classification after stage 20

Rank	Rider	Team	Time
1	Greg LeMond (USA)	Z–Tomasso	85h 49' 28"
2	Claudio Chiappucci (ITA)	Carrera Jeans–Vagabond	+ 2' 16"
3	Erik Breukink (NED)	PDM–Concorde	+ 2' 29"
4	Pedro Delgado (ESP)	Banesto	+ 5' 01"
5	Marino Lejarreta (ESP)	ONCE	+ 5' 05"
6	Eduardo Chozas (ESP)	ONCE	+ 9' 14"
7	Gianni Bugno (ITA)	Chateau d'Ax	+ 9' 39"
8	Raúl Alcalá (MEX)	PDM–Concorde	+ 11' 14"
9	Claude Criquielion (BEL)	Lotto–Superclub	+ 12' 04"
10	Miguel Induráin (ESP)	Banesto	+ 12' 47"

== Stage 21 ==
22 July 1990 — Brétigny-sur-Orge to Paris Champs-Élysées, 182.5 km (113.4 mi)

Stage 21 result

Rank	Rider	Team	Time
1	Johan Museeuw (BEL)	Lotto–Superclub	4h 53' 52"
2	Adriano Baffi (ITA)	Ariostea	s.t.
3	Olaf Ludwig (DDR)	Panasonic–Sportlife	s.t.
4	Djamolidine Abdoujaparov (URS)	Alfa Lum	s.t.
5	Davis Phinney (USA)	7-Eleven–Hoonved	s.t.
6	Sean Kelly (IRL)	PDM–Concorde	s.t.
7	Phil Anderson (AUS)	TVM	s.t.
8	Jelle Nijdam (NED)	Buckler–Colnago–Decca	s.t.
9	Adri van der Poel (NED)	Weinmann–SMM Uster	s.t.
10	Uwe Raab (DDR)	PDM–Concorde	s.t.

General classification after stage 21

Rank	Rider	Team	Time
1	Greg LeMond (USA)	Z–Tomasso	90h 43' 20"
2	Claudio Chiappucci (ITA)	Carrera Jeans–Vagabond	+ 2' 16"
3	Erik Breukink (NED)	PDM–Concorde	+ 2' 29"
4	Pedro Delgado (ESP)	Banesto	+ 5' 01"
5	Marino Lejarreta (ESP)	ONCE	+ 5' 05"
6	Eduardo Chozas (ESP)	ONCE	+ 9' 14"
7	Gianni Bugno (ITA)	Chateau d'Ax	+ 9' 39"
8	Raúl Alcalá (MEX)	PDM–Concorde	+ 11' 14"
9	Claude Criquielion (BEL)	Lotto–Superclub	+ 12' 04"
10	Miguel Induráin (ESP)	Banesto	+ 12' 47"
