= Mark Fotheringham =

Mark Fotheringham may refer to:

- Mark Fotheringham (Australian footballer) (born 1957), former Australian rules footballer with Yarraville and Williamstown
- Mark Fotheringham (Scottish footballer) (born 1983), Scottish association football manager and former player

== See also ==
- Fotheringham
