= Fotheringham =

Fotheringham is a surname of Scottish origin which means "a house supplying food." Fotheringhame is a variant spelling. Notable people with the surname include:

- Aaron Fotheringham (born 1991), American wheelchair athlete
- Alasdair Fotheringham, British journalist
- Allan Fotheringham (1932–2020), Canadian journalist
- Cole Fotheringham (born 1997), American football player
- Henry Fotheringham (born 1953), South African former cricketer
- John Knight Fotheringham (1874–1936), British historian of ancient astronomy and chronology
- Kai Fotheringham (born 2003), Scottish footballer
- Kevin Fotheringham (born 1975), Scottish footballer
- Mark Fotheringham (Australian footballer) (born 1957), Australian footballer
- Mark Fotheringham (Scottish footballer) (born 1983), Scottish footballer
- Nancy Fotheringham Cato (1917–2000), Australian author
- Philip Fotheringham-Parker (1907–1981), English racing driver
- Thomas Cook (Scottish politician) aka Thomas Fotheringham Cook (1908–1952)
- William Fotheringham, British journalist and author
- Willie Fotheringham, Scottish footballer

Fotheringhame

- Pattie Fotheringhame, (died 1955) Australian journalist

== Fictional persons ==
- Augustus C. Fotheringham, Sc.D. (Cantab.), fictional author of the science hoax article about Eoörnis pterovelox gobiensis.
