= William Fotheringham =

British cycling journalist (born 1965)

William Fotheringham (born 1965) is a sports writer specialising in cycling and rugby. As a newspaper journalist, he writes for The Guardian. Fotheringham was a features editor for Cycling Weekly, the features editor of Cycle Sport and co-founder of Procycling magazine. He is a current writer for procycling Magazine.

A graduate of Cambridge University with a degree in French, Russian and Italian, Fotheringham won the IPC Media Specialist Writer of the Year award in 1993 and 1998.

He has been a racing cyclist for nearly 40 years. He is described by Rapha as being "one of the finest writers in the ‘Pro Tour’ pressroom".

His 2012 biography of Eddy Merckx Half-Man, Half-Bike, was the first cycling title to achieve No 1 status in the Sunday Times bestseller lists.

He is the brother of fellow cycling journalist Alasdair Fotheringham.

His most recent books are Sunday in Hell, an account of how iconic director Jorgen Leth made the film of the same name about the 1976 Paris–Roubaix, and The Greatest, the Times and Life of Beryl Burton, a self-published venture.

== Books by Fotheringham ==
- Cycle Racing: How to Train, Race and Win. A. & C. Black. 1996. ISBN 978-0-7136-4540-8.
- Put Me Back on My Bike: In Search of Tom Simpson. Yellow Jersey Press. 2002. ISBN 978-0-224-06186-5.
- A Century of Cycling: The Classic Races and Legendary Champions. Motorbooks International. 2003. ISBN 978-0-7603-1553-8.
- Fotheringham's Sporting Trivia. Sanctuary Publishing Ltd. 2003. ISBN 978-1-86074-510-2.
- Roule Britannia: A History of Britons in the Tour de France. Yellow Jersey Press. 2005. ISBN 978-0-224-07425-4.
- Fotheringham's Sporting Pastimes. Robson Books Ltd. 2006. ISBN 978-1-86105-953-6.
- Fallen Angel: The Passion of Fausto Coppi. Jonathan Cape. 2009. ISBN 978-0-224-07447-6.
- Merckx: Half-Man, Half-Bike. Yellow Jersey Press. 2012. ISBN 978-0-224-07448-3.
- Bradley Wiggins – My Time. Yellow Jersey Press. 2012. ISBN 978-0-224-09212-8.
- Bradley Wiggins – My Time. Yellow Jersey Press. 2012. ISBN 978-0-224-09213-5.
- Racing Hard. Faber and Faber. 2013. ISBN 978-0-571-30363-2.
- The Badger: Bernard Hinault and the Fall and Rise of French Cycling. Yellow Jersey Press. 2016. ISBN 978-0224092050.
- Lizzie Armitstead – Steadfast: My Story. Blink. 2017. ISBN 978-1911274254.
- Sunday in Hell: Behind the Lens of the Greatest Cycling Film Ever. Yellow Jersey Press. 2018. ISBN 978-0224092029.
- The Greatest: The Times and Life of Beryl Burton. YouCaxton. 2019. ISBN 978-1-912419-53-1.

=== As translator ===
- Voet, Willy (2001). Breaking the Chain: Drugs and Cycling – The True Story. Yellow Jersey Press. ISBN 978-0-224-06056-1.
- Fignon, Laurent (2010). We Were Young and Carefree. London: Yellow Jersey Press. ISBN 978-0-224-08319-5.
