= Lac de Vassivière =

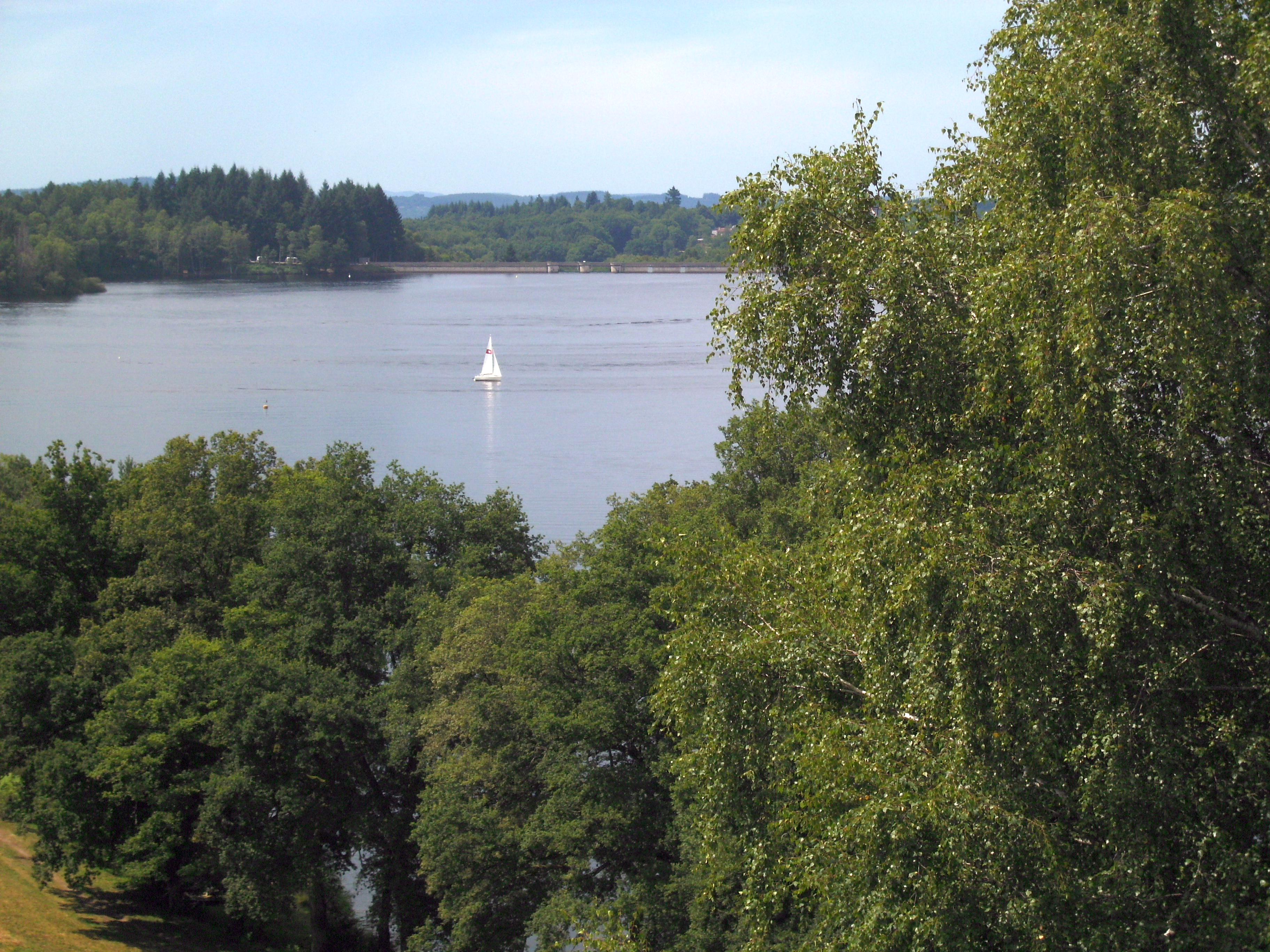
- With one of the dams in the background

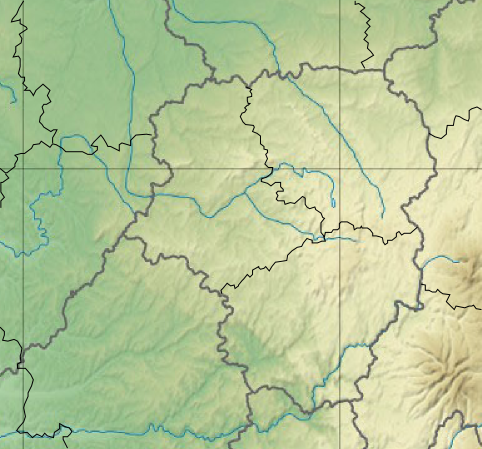
- Location within Limousin
- Location: Limousin
- Coordinates: 45°47′50″N 1°52′45″E
- Type: reservoir
- Primary inflows: Maulde River
- Primary outflows: Maulde River
- Basin countries: France
- Surface area: 9.76 km^{2} (3.77 sq mi)
- Max. depth: 32 m (105 ft)
- Water volume: 106×10^{6} m^{3} (86,000 acre⋅ft)
- Surface elevation: 650 m (2,130 ft)
- Islands: Isle of Vassivière

The lac de Vassivière or Vassivière Lake (French pronunciation: [vasivjɛʁ]; Occitan: Vacivièra), one of France's largest artificial lakes, is a large man-made reservoir of about 10 square kilometres (2,500 acres). It is situated on the Plateau de Millevaches in the départements of Creuse and Haute-Vienne. It is the largest area of water in the Limousin region of France and provides water supplies, hydroelectricity, and leisure facilities.

== Construction ==
The lake was constructed after World War II and opened at Christmas 1950. It is the product of two dams in the valley of the Maulde River, an important tributary of the Vienne River.

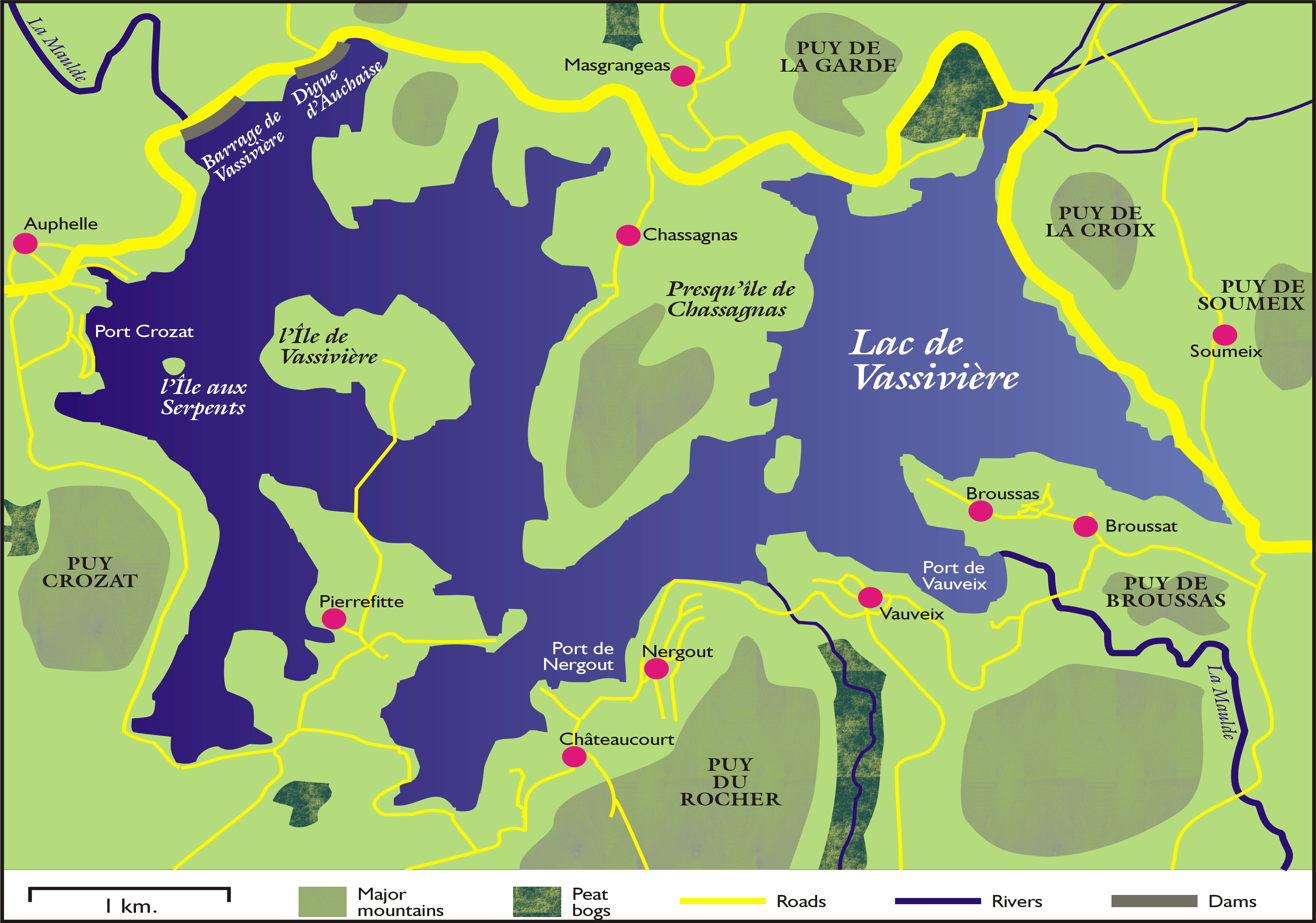
Sketch map of Vassivière Lake.

The Maulde is the most important source of water for the lake, and the lac de Lavaud-Gelade, a 285-hectare (700-acre) reservoir to the east, is able to feed it via an underground canal.

The lac de Vassivière feeds water to a hydro-electric station at Mazet, to the west.

== Geography and environment ==
The lac de Vassivière is surrounded by more than 7,600 hectares (19,000 acres) of land of ecological or natural interest (ZNIEFF: French: Zone naturelle d'intérêt écologique, faunistique et floristique), level 1, grouped in 15 distinct areas. These present the full range of landscapes characteristic of the Plateau de Millevaches: peat bog, wetland, heath and forest. The bogs, in particular, are unique and fragile small ecosystems, composed of many strata of plant material, and forming a carbon sink. They are the sources of many of the streams and rivers that flow from the region.

The climate is heavily influenced by the elevated, inland location. Milevaches winters are cold with snowfalls heavy enough for some winter sports. Spring is generally cool and wet, and summer is warm and pleasant, albeit with occasional fierce thunderstorms. Autumn often brings a period of considerable sun and warmth.

The lac de Vassivière is the 16th largest lake in France by area, but sixth among the artificial lakes, and tenth among fresh water lakes. It is surrounded by many different communes, including:

- in Creuse: Faux-la-Montagne, Royère-de-Vassivière
- in Haute-Vienne: Beaumont-du-Lac, Peyrat-le-Château

== Amenities ==
As the lac de Vassivière is entirely inside the Millevaches Regional Natural Park, large parts of its shoreline are protected from excessive development, and form an important haven for wildlife, and wild flowers in particular.

However, with 45 kilometres (28 mi) of shoreline there has still been room for a good deal of tourist development, mostly at well-separated, small sites. This provides camping and picnic facilities, small-scale catering, hotels, artificial beaches, and small ports. There are demarcated zones for motor boating and water skiing, but most of the surface is dominated by small sailing boats. Much of the surrounding housing caters for tourists. There are numerous organised cycling and walking events. The lake has, in fact, become the most important area for sport, and especially water sports, in the region.

== Isle of Vassivière ==
The Isle of Vassivière is an island at the centre of the lake with an area of 0.75 km^{2} (0.29 sq mi). It is dominated by a château and features a number of exhibition and performance spaces, a landscape sculpture park and small menagerie. It is also the site of the lake's main lighthouse, designed in 1988 by Aldo Rossi.

The island is connected to the shore by a causeway. Only authorised vehicles are allowed, so it is normally accessed on foot or by road train.

== Transport ==
The lake is entirely encircled by roads and footpaths. The nearest railway station is Eymoutiers/Lac de Vassivière. As well as guided tours by boat, there is a free water taxi on the lake.

== Gallery ==
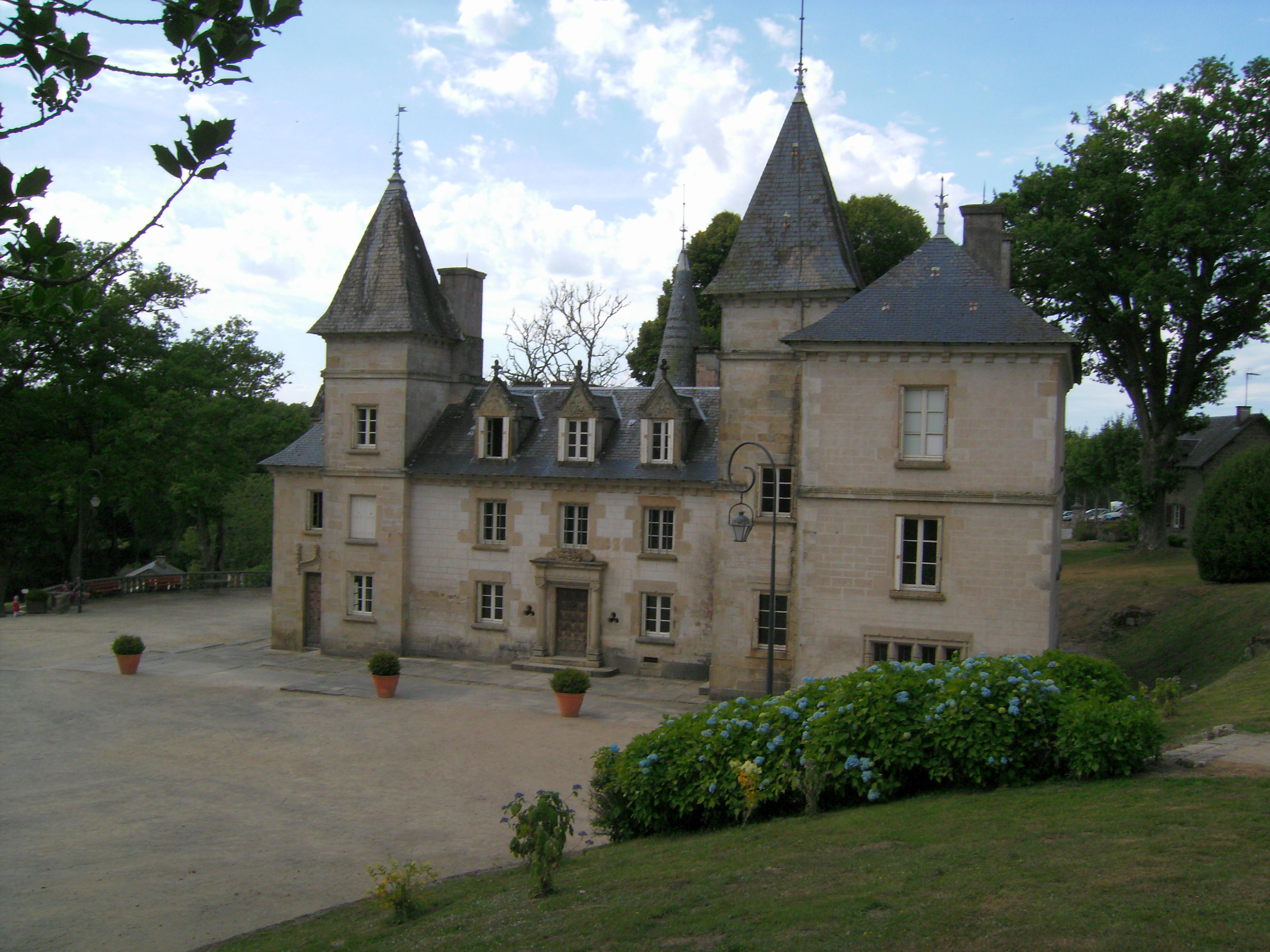
Château on the Isle of Vassivière

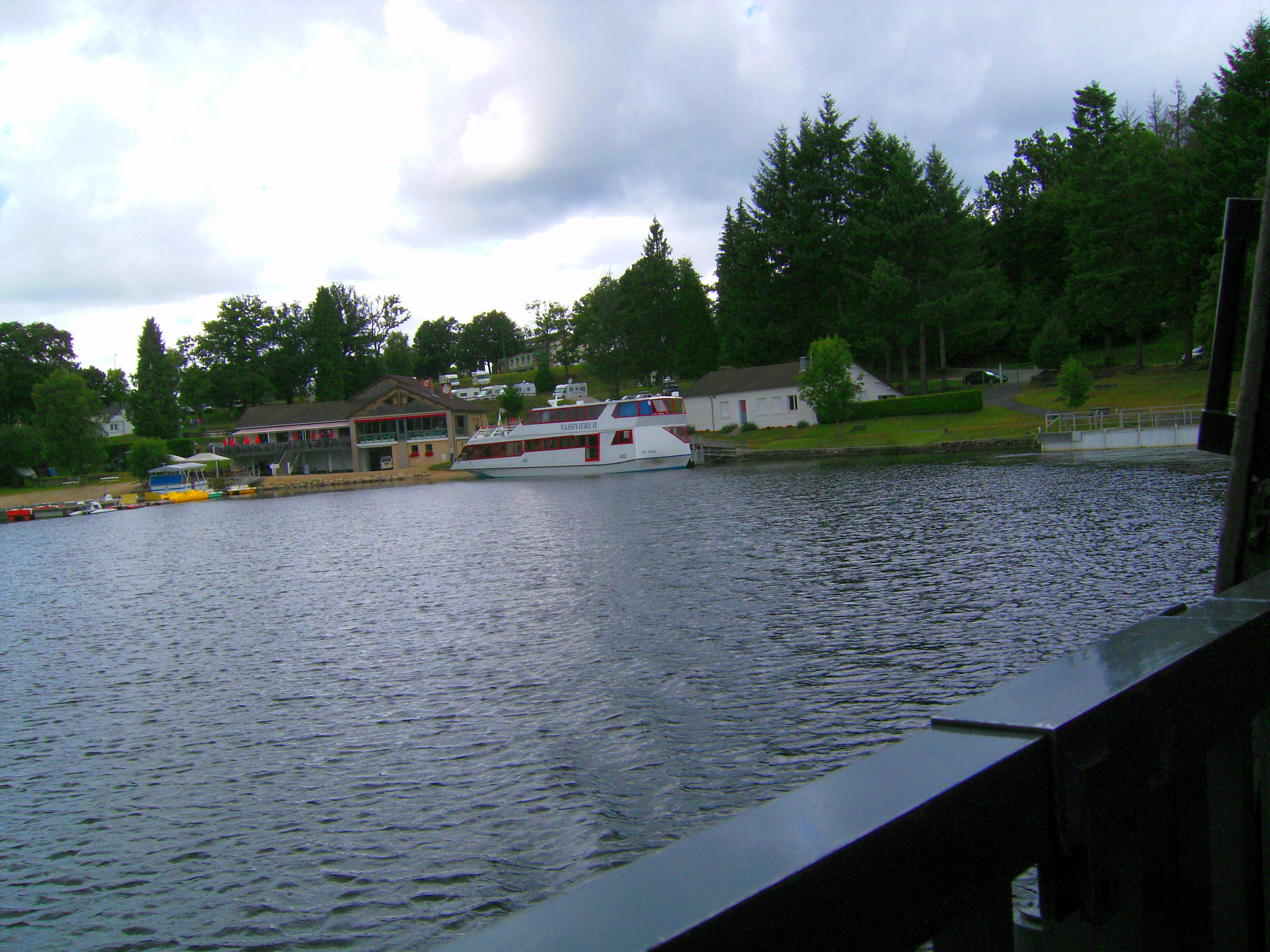
Small port and leisure facilities on the lakeside at Auphelle

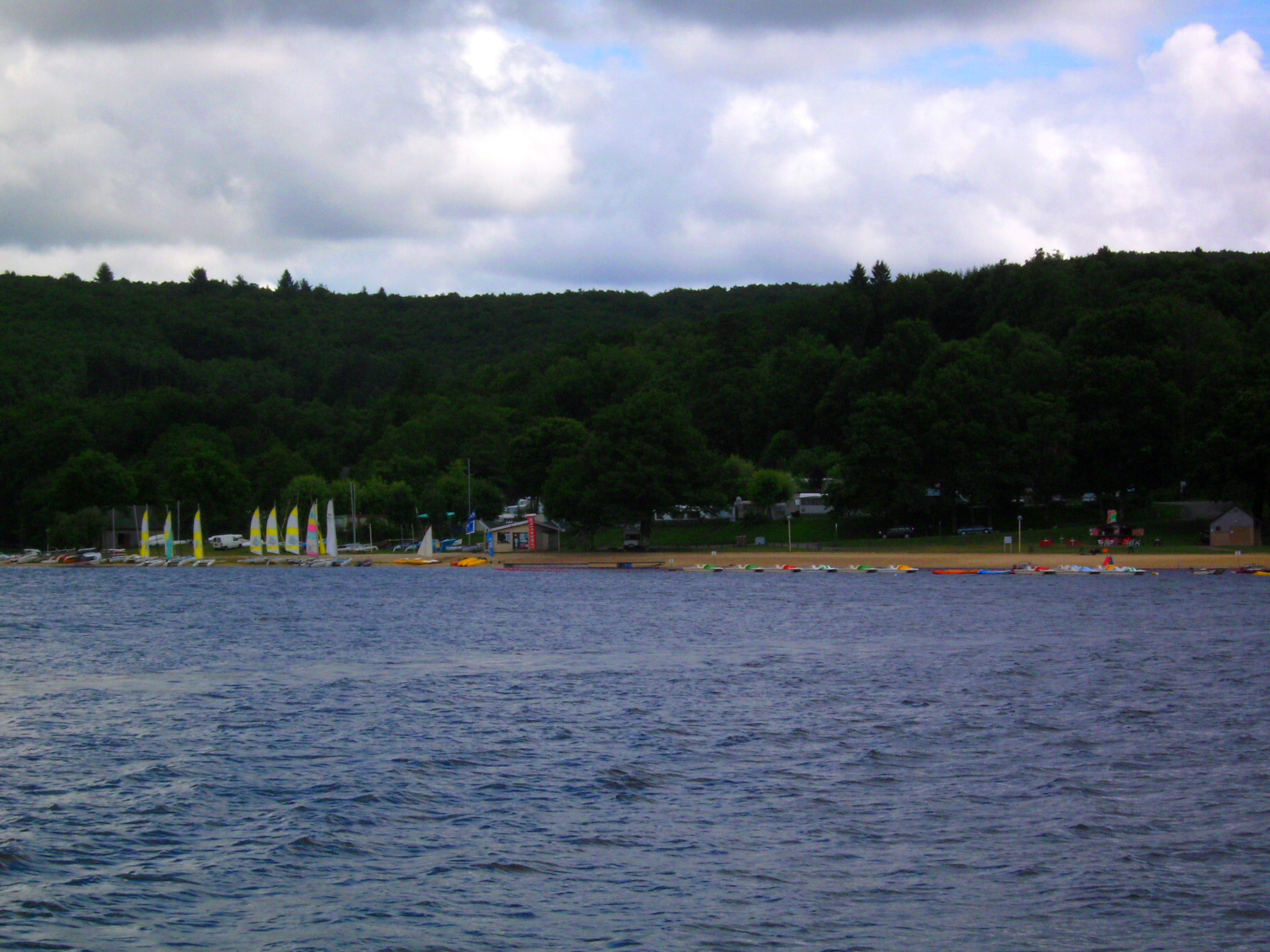
Leisure beach on the south side of the lake, with typical Plateau de Millevaches landscape in the background
