= Alasdair Fotheringham =

British foreign affairs and sports journalist

Alasdair Fotheringham is a British foreign affairs and sports journalist, specializing in cycle racing.

Based in Spain, Fotheringham works as a freelance journalist and has been the Independent's cycling correspondent since 2001. He has also written articles for The Independent on Sunday, The Guardian, The Daily Express, The Sunday Express, Cycling Weekly and Reuters.

Having covered the Tour de France 17 times, Fotheringham covered the Olympic Games for the first time in 2008. He is the brother of fellow cycling journalist William Fotheringham.

== Books ==
- The Eagle of Toledo: The Life and Times of Federico Bahamontes. Aurum Press. 2012. ISBN 978-1-8451-3700-7.
- Reckless: The Life and Times of Luis Ocaña. Bloomsbury Sport. 2014. ISBN 978-1-4088-4602-5.
- The End of the Road: The Festina Affair and the Tour that Almost Wrecked Cycling. Bloomsbury Sport. 2015. ISBN 978-1-4729-1302-9.
