= Roberto Gusmeroli =

Italian cyclist

Personal information
- Born: 18 October 1966 (age 59) Morbegno, Italy

Cycling career
- Sport: Cycling
- Role: Rider

Roberto Gusmeroli (born 18 October 1966) is an Italian former racing cyclist. He rode in two editions of the Tour de France.
