= Peter Roes =

Belgian cyclist

Personal information
- Born: 4 May 1964 (age 62) Herentals, Belgium

Cycling career
- Sport: Cycling
- Role: Rider

Peter Roes (born 4 May 1964) is a Belgian former racing cyclist. He rode in three editions of the Tour de France. He also competed in the team pursuit event at the 1984 Summer Olympics.
