= Dimitri Konyshev =

Russian cyclist (born 1966)

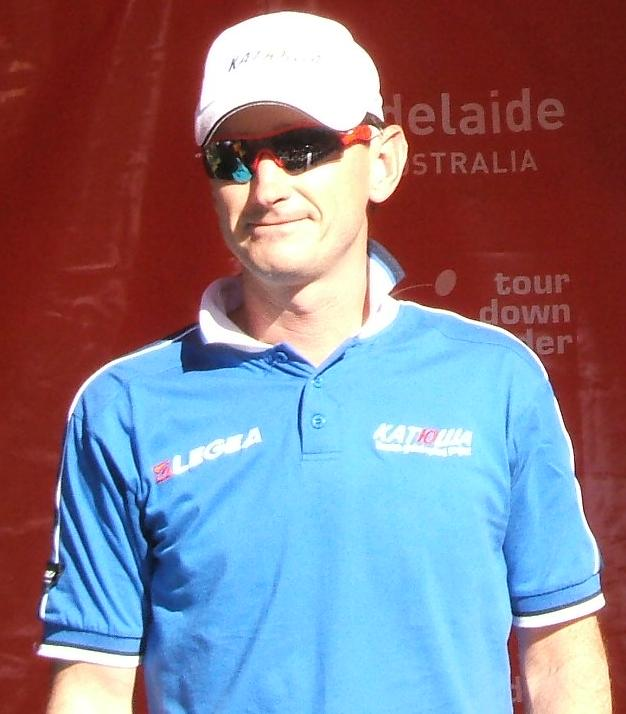
- Konyshev in 2009

Personal information
- Full name: Dmitri Borisovich Konyshev
- Born: 18 February 1966 (age 60) Gorky, Gorky Oblast, Russian SFSR, Soviet Union
- Height: 1.86 m (6 ft 1 in)
- Weight: 77 kg (170 lb)

Cycling career
- Sport: Cycling
- Current team: Russian National Team
- Discipline: Road
- Role: Rider (retired); Sports director

Professional teams
- 1989–1990: Alfa Lum–STM
- 1991–1992: TVM–Sanyo
- 1993–1996: Jolly Componibili–Club 88
- 1997: Roslotto–ZG Mobili
- 1998–1999: Mercatone Uno–Bianchi
- 2000–2002: Fassa Bortolo
- 2003: Marlux–Wincor Nixdorf
- 2004–2006: LPR–Piacenza

Managerial teams
- 2007–2008: Tinkoff Credit Systems
- 2009–2019: Team Katusha
- 2009–: Russian National Team
- 2020–2022: Gazprom–RusVelo

Major wins
- Grand Tours Tour de France 4 individual stages (1990, 1991, 1999) Giro d'Italia Points classification (2000) Intergiro classification (1997) 4 individual stages (1993, 1997, 2000) Vuelta a España 1 individual stage (1996) One-day races and Classics Soviet National Road Race Champion (1990) Russian National Road Race Champion (1993, 2001) Giro dell'Emilia (1989) GP Industria & Artigianato di Larciano (1990) Grand Prix de Wallonie (1997) Grand Prix de Fourmies (1999) Coppa Sabatini (1999, 2001)
Medal record
Men's road bicycle racing
Representing Soviet Union
UCI Road World Championships
Silver medal – second place	1989 Chambéry	Elite road race
Representing Russia
UCI Road World Championships
Bronze medal – third place	1992 Benidorm	Elite road race

Dimitri Borisovich Konyshev (Russian: Дмитрий Борисович Конышев; born 18 February 1966) is a retired Russian road bicycle racer and current sports director.

During his 17-year professional career, Konyshev achieved stage victories in all three Grand Tours, with a total of nine wins. He claimed three stage victories at the Tour de France, four at the Giro d'Italia, and one at the Vuelta a España. He also won the points classification in the Giro d'Italia in 2000 and the intergiro classification in the Giro d'Italia in 1997.

Konyshev’s son, Alexander Konychev, is also a professional cyclist, representing Italy.

== Early life ==
Dimitri (often spelled Dmitry) Borisovich Konyshev was born in Gorky, Soviet Union (now Nizhny Novgorod, Russia).

Konyshev grew up within the Soviet sports system of the 1980s. He initially tried playing handball, but decided to take up cycling in 1984. The switch was reportedly inspired by his hero Sergei Sukhoruchenkov’s victory in the Olympic road race at the 1980 Moscow Summer Olympics.

== Career ==
=== Amateur years (1986 - 1989) ===
Konyshev earned his first career victory after winning stage 10 of the 1986 edition of the Coors Classic. He defeated Greg LeMond and Phil Anderson in the sprint.

In 1987, Konyshev achieved several victories, including four six-stage races, with two overall and two at one-day events. His season began in January with the Gran Premio Palio del Recioto, where he won with his teammates Vasily Zhdanov and Djamolidine Abdoujaparov. He won the GP Liberazione in his second Italian race, out-sprinting West German Bernd Gröne and finishing three seconds ahead of the peloton.

In the USSR, Konyshev and his team raced in the Tour of Sochi, where he finished fifth in the competition.

In May, Konyshev received three stage wins. This was followed by placing eighth overall at the Course de la Paix, finishing over 5 minutes down on Uwe Ampler.

He went to Austria for the Österreich-Rundfahrt, where he did not finish below ninth position in any of the nine stages. Following a stage win in stage 3, he won the overall race by 1' 25" to Austrian Helmut Wechselberger.

He finished in the top 10 for seven of the 12-stage races at the Tour de l'Avenir. He won stage 7, a mountain stage, finishing in Strasbourg from an early breakaway. He went on to win the points classification and finish 24th overall.

In 1988, Konyshev finished fifth in the Tour of Sochi.

In February 1988, Konyshev won the red jersey for points classification and two stages at the Vuelta a Cuba. He won two stages at the Giro delle Regioni, a race he had won overall in 1987. This consistency continued with top 10 placements in most stages at the Course de la Paix, finishing eleventh overall, just over two minutes down on Uwe Ampler.

Konyshev then won the amateur version of the Giro d'Italia, the Giro Ciclistico d'Italia. He also took three stage victories.

His string of results in 1987–88, culminating with winning the Giro d’Italia “Under‑26” in 1988, caught the attention of pro team Alfa Lum, and Konyshev went professional with the team in 1989.

=== Alfa Lum (1989 to 1990) ===
==== 1989: World silver medal ====
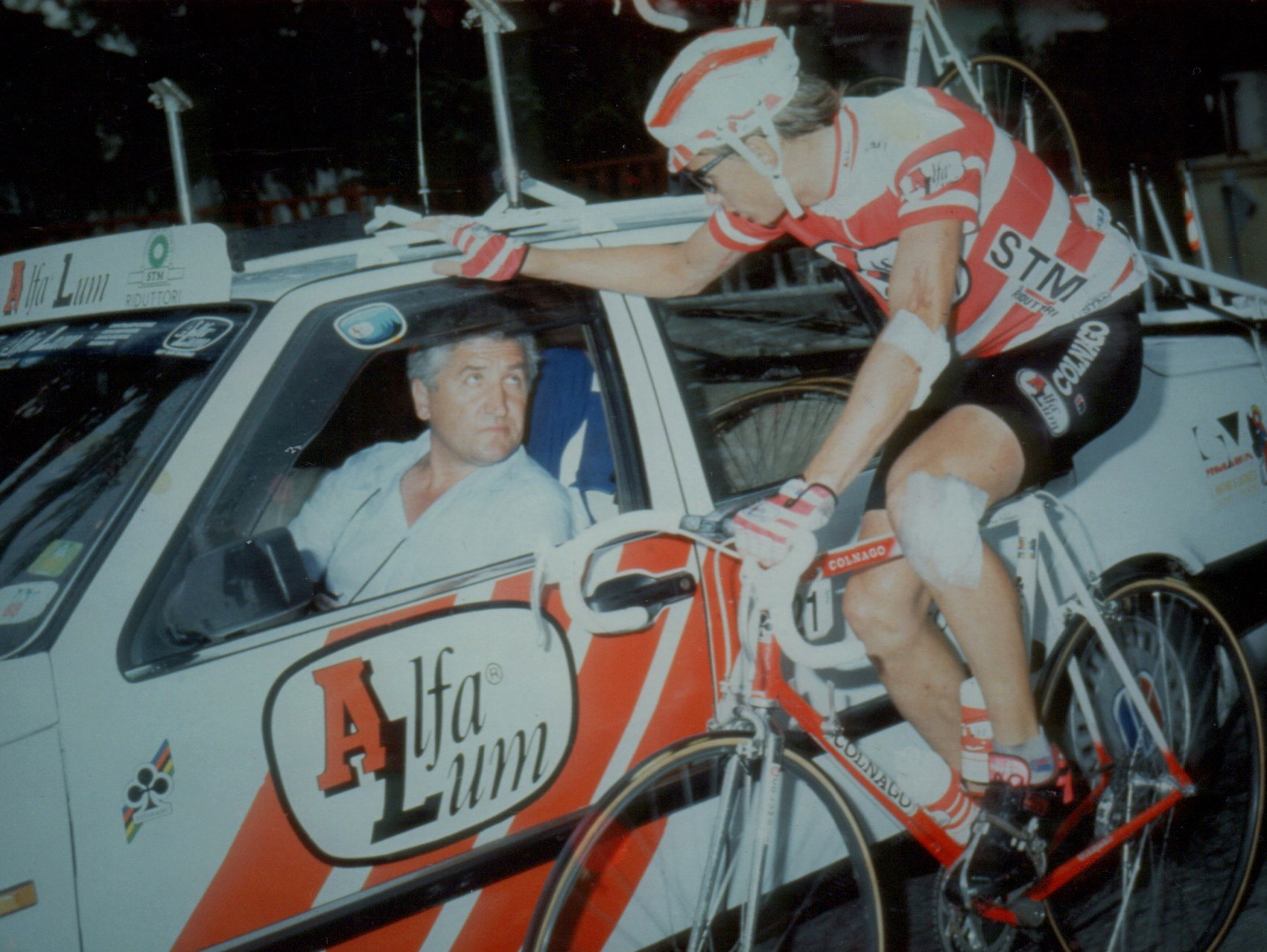
Konyshev at the team car in the 1989 Giro d'Italia

Konyshev's 1989 season started in Europe with the Settimana Internazionale di Coppi e Bartali. The first stage was a sprint, where Konyshev finished third behind Stefano Allocchio and Sean Kelly. The first major race of the season was the Tirreno–Adriatico, where he managed three top-10 finishes in bunch sprints.

He then advanced onto the Giro del Trentino, where he finished 17th overall at the three-stage race.

At the Giro di Toscana, Konyshev finished second behind Maurizio Fondriest and beat Gianbattista Baronchelli in an eight-man sprint for the line.

The next race on Konyshev's calendar was the Giro d'Italia, a Grand Tour. 1989 was the first year that a Soviet would ride a Grand Tour, as previously, all Soviet cyclists had been prevented from riding professionally. During stage 5, Konyshev earned fifth place, followed by tenth in stage 6. In stage 10, he beat the eventual winner, Laurent Fignon, in the bunch sprint to claim sixth. His best result of the Giro came during Stage 9, which finished in Gubbio atop a mountain. Konyshev ended second behind Bjarne Riis in the three-man sprint for the line.

Konyshev's first win of the season came in August, at the Coppa Ugo Agostoni. In August 1989, he competed in the road race at the UCI Road World Championships and took second place behind Greg LeMond.

Konyshev then advanced to Giro dell'Emilia. Here, he won a 10-man reduced bunch sprint to take his second victory of the year.

His 1989 season ended with the Firenze–Pistoia, an individual time trial (ITT). Konyshev finished 24th, over 5 minutes down on winner Tony Rominger.

==== 1990: First Grand Tour stage victory ====
Konyshev rode for Alfa Lum for a second season. His season started with the Dwars door België, where he finished in the second bunch and sprinted to 10th place.

He then competed in the Gent–Wevelgem and finished in 8th place.

After the cobbled classics, he travelled to Italy to prepare for the Giro d'Italia. The first preparation race was the Giro del Trentino, where he sprinted to 3rd place in Stage 1. He fared better at the Giro di Toscana, where he sprinted to ninth with the third bunch of cyclists to cross the line.

His second Grand Tour was once again the Giro d'Italia. After the breakaway in Stage 6, Konyshev was in the chasing bunch and sprinted to 7th. In Stage 9, Konyshev and Vladimir Poulnikov managed to get away on the final climb, where Poulnikov then attacked to go solo. Konyshev won the sprint of the remaining riders, coming in second place. During Stage 14, Konyshev finished 6th. Stage 16 was a mountain stage finishing atop Pordoi Pass. Gianni Bugno and Charly Mottet got away up the hill. The chasing group slowly whittled down, with Konyshev dropping and finishing in 6th. The last stage where Konyshev attained a top 10 finish was Stage 17, where he finished 8th in the bunch sprint. Overall, Konyshev came 30th out of 163 finishers.

After the Giro, Konyshev headed back to the Soviet Union to compete in the national championships. He won the race, beating teammates Piotr Ugrumov and Vladimir Pulnikov in a sprint.

Later in June, the GP Industria & Artigianato was held. Nearing the end of the race, Konyshev attacked multiple times to drop the other riders and won by five seconds beating Massimo Ghirotto.

10 days later, he began his first Tour de France. Konyshev would become the first-ever rider from the Soviet Union to win a stage in the Tour de France by winning Stage 17. Konyshev made it into the break of the day. With Greg LeMond getting a puncture and the peloton waiting for him, it gave the breakaway the chance to succeed. Johan Bruyneel attacked through the mountain points with Konyshev on his wheel, and the two rode away from the bunch together. It came down to a sprint where Konyshev beat Bruyneel by one second, taking his first ever Grand Tour stage.

After the Tour, Konyshev was in 25th and 3rd in the youth classification.

Konyshev only rode four further races in the 1990 season. The first was the Giro del Veneto, where a reduced bunch of five riders made their way to the line after the hilly course. Konyshev ended up finishing fourth. He then competed in the UCI Road World Championships, where he once again rode the Road race, this time with considerable scrutiny from spectators following the previous year's performance. He ended up working for teammate Piotr Ugrumov, who finished eleventh. Konyshev came home 45 seconds down in 30th. His final two races were the Trofeo Baracchi and the Giro dell'Emilia; he didn't finish the first and came 77th in the second.

=== TVM (1991 to 1992) ===
==== 1991: Two more Tour Stage wins ====
Konyshev started the 1991 season with a team change, joining the Dutch TVM–Sanyo team.

His first race was Trofeo Pantalica, where he finished 12th equal in the main bunch. He then competed in the Tirreno–Adriatico, where he sprinted to win Stage 3.

Working for Dane Jesper Skibby at the Tour of Flanders, Konyshev came across the line in the fifth bunch of cyclists, placing 26th.

Later in April, he rode the Grand Prix Pino Cerami, finishing 8th as last place in the chasing bunch of lone winner Andrei Tchmil.

He then competed in the Ardennes classics, which started with La Flèche Wallonne, where Konyshev was joint leader. He finished in 5th position, 3' 02" down on the winner.

Next was the Amstel Gold Race, where three riders got away and sprinted for the victory. However, Konyshev was in the main peloton and finished 77th in the sprint for the remaining places.

Starting in his first Grand Tour for the year, Konyshev lined up with the number 111 on his back. It was his first time participating in the Vuelta a España. Stage 1 was a team time trial (TTT) in teams of three. Konyshev's team came 5th in the stage, placing him 15th going into the Vuelta. Stage 2a was a sprint where Konyshev came 12th. Stage 2b was another TTT; this time, all of the team's riders rode together on the 41 km course. TVM came fourth in the Stage, 1'37" behind winners ONCE. This moved him to 24th, almost 2 minutes down overall. Stage 3 was considerably more difficult. This time, Konyshev led out teammate Jesper Skibby, who took the win with Konyshev finishing 5th. He abandoned the race during Stage 5 with a broken collarbone.

The next race for Konyshev was the Tour de France, where he came as a domestique for Gert-Jan Theunisse, who would finish 13th overall, and hunt Stage wins. Konyshev's first opportunity came on Stage 9, when the breakaway he was in made it to the final two kilometers, with attacks from the Belgian Johan Bruyneel, who was only caught with 800m to go. Mauro Ribeiro attacked and held off with Laurent Jalabert second and Konyshev in third. Stage 19 was Konyshev's next chance at winning. He was in the breakaway of the day with Pascal Richard. With 800m to go, Konyshev started his sprint. Richard came around and celebrated; as he did so, Konyshev passed him on the line, taking the stage victory.

The final stage of the Tour finished on the Champs-Élysées in a bunch sprint. Lemond attacked and held the bunch off, getting a lead of 50 seconds, but the Banesto team of winner Miguel Induráin paced him down, ensuring the race would end in a sprint. With 2 km to go, the sprint trains of TVM and Carrera Jeans–Tassoni, who were riding for Djamolidine Abdoujaparov, were neck and neck. Abdoujaparov opened the sprint and, with his elbows out style, crashed into the barriers, colliding with many of the competitors and knocking them over. Konyshev, on the other side of the road, was unaffected by this incident and finished in 1st place, taking his second stage this edition and the last Grand Tour stage win for a Soviet. Konyshev placed 52nd overall in the Tour.

In August, Konyshev had three races: Züri-Metzgete, Trittico Premondiale I, and Giro del Veneto, and he came 19th, 6th, and 19th, respectively. The Grand Prix de la Libération was a stand-alone team time trial event, where teams would field six riders over a 90 km course. TVM placed 5th, 1' 33" down on winners Buckler–Colnago–Decca. Konyshev's season ended at Paris–Tours, where he led Johan Capiot to victory in a mass bunch sprint.

==== 1992: World Bronze medal ====
Following the dissolution of the Soviet Union in late 1991, all Soviet athletes were now to ride under the flag of Russia. Still riding for the TVM–Sanyo, Konyshev's season started at Milan–San Remo, where he attacked the Cipressa and got away with another rider. The attempt was in vain, as they were caught shortly after by the Ariostea team, pacing for Moreno Argentin.

The first major result of the season came during the Amstel Gold Race, which was a 247.5 kilometre hilly classic, ending in an uphill mass sprint. Winner Olaf Ludwig was leading to the bottom of the hill and started his sprint early. Konyshev was part of the main pack that fought to catch Ludwig, but ended up finishing in 3rd place.

Konyshev then competed in the first Grand Tour of the season, the Vuelta a España, which started with a prologue. Konyshev placed in the top 10 of stages 3, 4, 5, and 6, but did not start the 8th stage. Stage 2b was a TTT, with TVM finishing 1' 03" behind Gatorade–Chateau d'Ax. The closest Konyshev came to victory was Stage 4, where he came fourth in the bunch sprint.

He then travelled to Germany, after recovering from the Vuelta, for the Dekra Open Stutgart, helping Peter Meinert Nielsen to second overall.

In June, at the Vuelta a Asturias, while riding as a domestique for Nielsen, Konyshev sprinted to victory in Stage 6 of the event.

In late June, Konyshev raced at the inaugural Russian National Road Race Championships, finishing second behind Asiat Saitov of the Kelme–Don Cafe team.

In July, Konyshev competed in his third Tour de France. Stage 5 provided him his first opportunity. He was in the break of the day, and at 30 km to go, he had a lead of 5 minutes, with the Lotto–Mavic–MBK pacing in the peloton. An attack by Guido Bontempi in the last 5 kilometers took a lead of 30 seconds to the finish. Konyshev then attacked in the final kilometer to gain 6 seconds on the rest of the breakaway and take second. Stages 6 & 7 were both bunch sprints where the breakaway had won, and Konyshev managed 8th and 6th respectively.

In Stage 11, Konyshev was part of a three-man breakaway with Laurent Fignon and Laurent Dufaux. The chase group caught them after the big hill and worked together until Fignon attacked and got away. As part of the second bunch, Konyshev sprinted to 5th position. At the start of the final mountain in Stage 15, Franco Chioccioli attacked and got clear of the ONCE-led peloton. On the descent of that hill, Konyshev attacked and got a small gap. Further down the descent, he was joined by Giancarlo Perini. The two worked hard to catch Chioccioli, but the Italian won the stage. Coming into the finishing straight, the pair had a 50m lead on the peloton. Perini was in the lead until Konyshev opened his sprint with 200m to go and took second place on the stage. Konyshev abandoned the race during Stage 17.

Konyshev's next race was the Clásica de San Sebastián, where he finished fourth with the chasing bunch, 1' 12" down on the winner.

He then travelled to the Netherlands for the Ronde van Nederland, where he achieved fourth place in Stage 2.

Konyshev concluded his season at the UCI Road World Championships, where he competed in the road race, placing third in the reduced bunch sprint behind Gianni Bugno.

=== Jolly–AKI (1993 to 1996) ===
==== 1993: Giro d'Italia Stage wins ====
After leaving TVM–Sanyo at the end of 1992, Konyshev joined Jolly Componibili–Club 88 for the 1993 season.

Konyshev's season started at Tirreno–Adriatico, where he sprinted to 10th in Stage 6.

He then raced Milan–San Remo that year, not featuring in the action but finishing in 96th in the third bunch on the road.

Konyshev then rode the Belgian classics, not finishing above 35th in any of them.

He achieved a podium in Stage 3 of the Giro del Trentino.

His results improved while competing in the Giro d'Italia. Stage 1a was an 85 km race which ended with Moreno Argentin attacking the last rise and the peloton coming home 35 seconds down. Konyshev sprinted to 10th place. Stage 2 ended in a bunch sprint, with Konyshev taking third. The only notable hill in Stage 5 occurred with 12 km to go, which was when Konyshev made his attack. He was joined by Italians Stefano Della Santa and Flavio Giupponi. The finish was an uphill sprint with Konyshev launching with 200m to go, and the peloton just behind them. Konyshev won the stage by 2 seconds over Della Santa, with the peloton finishing four seconds behind. This stage win moved him into 9th position overall.

The following day, Stage 6 finished in a bunch sprint with Konyshev finishing in 5th place. In Stage 7, the breakaway won the stage with Konyshev safely in the peloton, holding his ninth overall. With Stage 8 ending in another mass sprint, an out-of-position Konyshev sprinted to 12th, finishing at the same time as the winner. Konyshev held his 9th overall placing until Stage 10, a 28 km individual time trial (ITT), where he lost 3' 15", dropping to 26th place overall. Konyshev would not feature again until Stage 12. He had his second stage win of the Giro, this time by a sprint of 20 riders who had ridden away from race leader Bruno Leali and the Banesto controlled peloton. He featured twice more in reduced bunch sprints in this edition of the Giro, finishing 6th in Stage 16 and 9th in Stage 21. Konyshev finished 26th Overall in the Giro, the best placing of his career.

In late June, Konyshev competed in the Russian National Road Race Championships, where he beat the previous year's winner, Asiat Saitov.

Of the twelve races Konyshev rode after winning in Russia, he had only some success in 4 of them. Stage 4 of the Ronde van Nederland finished in a sprint where Konyshev came fourth. Another fourth, in the one-day race Giro della Romagna, came later in September. The last two races of his 1993 season were Gran Piemonte, often thought of as a warm-up for his final race, the Giro di Lombardia. At the Gran Piemonte, Konyshev finished fourth in a sprint of 6 riders who escaped from the peloton earlier in the race. He missed the move of the day, but kept working in the peloton. When the peloton was in the finishing straight, Konyshev attacked, taking a gap of 5 seconds to secure 9th place in the race.

==== 1994: Top-10's ====
Konyshev started his 1994 season with Jolly Componibili–Cage in February at the Trofeo Laigueglia, where he finished in 23rd place.

His first major race was in Italy with the Tirreno–Adriatico, where he achieved third in three stages and tenth in another, finishing 26th overall.

The 1994 Milan–San Remo was won by Giorgio Furlan, who won by attacking on the Poggio and holding off the chasing bunch to the line. Konyshev was part of the bunch chasing Furlan; he finished 20 seconds down, sprinting to tenth place.

Konyshev then travelled to Belgium to prepare for the cobble classics, where he finished in 24th place at E3 Prijs Vlaanderen, 30th at Classic Brugge–De Panne, and 12th at the Tour of Flanders. The Tour of Flanders ended in a photo-finish for the winners, but Konyshev came home 1' 54" behind the winners in the bunch sprint for 6th.

This result was followed by 7th at Gent–Wevelgem, before Konyshev moved onto the "hell of the north", Paris–Roubaix. The conditions for Roubaix were unusual in 1994 because the surrounding areas were covered in snow. The race was considerably difficult for the competitors, as snow fell on them in short flurries over the day, which made the cobble slippery and muddy. Konyshev came home over 13 minutes down, in 37th. With Konyshev not at best form and missing the moves of the day, he came home in 40th for the year's La Flèche Wallonne, where the Gewiss–Ballan team took all three spots on the podium.

The Amstel Gold Race was held three days later on 23 April 1994, and Konyshev sprinted home in the second bunch on the road to 12th position. An eighth place in the mass sprint finish of Eschborn–Frankfurt gave Konyshev a moral boost.

He then went to Italy to prepare for the Giro d'Italia, riding first the Giro di Toscana and then Giro del Friuli, finishing 13th and sixth respectively. The 1994 Giro d'Italia started in Bologna with a flat stage, which resulted in a mass bunch sprint where Konyshev came tenth.

He achieved three more top-10 places in that year's Giro, his best being Stage 12 where he came fourth, 2 seconds behind the winner. On Stage 19, Konyshev crashed and had to abandon the race. He did not race again until the end of July at the Vuelta a Burgos, with a fourth place in the mass sprint of Stage 1.

He finished in the peloton for the one-day race Clásica de San Sebastián, coming home 2' 09" down on the winner in 16th.

His only victory of the season came at the Ronde van Nederland, where Konyshev won Stage 1 of the race, taking the lead by 23 seconds after escaping with Luca Scinto.

Konyshev completed his season with the Autumn Classics, bettering his previous year's result in Giro di Lombardia to finish fourth.

During the road race at the 1994 UCI Road World Championships, Konyshev got a bag stuck in his rear shifter, leaving access to only two of his gears. He managed to finish in 6th place, 15 seconds down on the winner.

In all of Konyshev's top-10 placements in that year's races, he finished 29th in the world rankings, his best result for his whole career.

==== 1995: Stage race contender ====
Konyshev rode for the same team again that season, but the team had a sponsor change, so it was now called Aki–Gipiemme. The season started on 8 February 1995 at the La Méditerranéenne. With his team losing time in the opening team time trial, Konyshev had some time to make up. He did this on Stage 3 by grabbing the bonus seconds that came with finishing third, followed by third again in Stage 6, this time in a mountain sprint. This moved him to finish fourth overall, his best stage race result since 1989. After finishing ninth in Nice–Alassio, Konyshev headed to Spain to ride the Volta a la Comunitat Valenciana, where he finished third on the final stage.

Tirreno–Adriatico was the first major race of the 1995 season for Konyshev. With the first 3 stages not being won by more than 5 seconds, he did not lose too much time. Konyshev finished fourth in Stage 4, 10 seconds down on the winner. With Gianluca Pierobon winning from the breakaway up the hilly Stage 5, Konyshev only lost 11 seconds to the race leader. The rest of the stages ended in mass sprints, with Konyshev sprinting to seventh in Stage 7. After the Tour, Konyshev was third overall, his top result in a Top-level stage race.

Continuing in Italy, the next race was Milan–San Remo. Konyshev made the move of the day but was distanced on the Poggio from the leaders. He held off the peloton by 2 seconds to come home seventh, 15 seconds down on the winner.

It was then off to the Belgium classics. The first race was Brabantse Pijl, where Konyshev came third, losing the sprint for second place to Alexander Gontchenkov. The pair came home 6 seconds down on winner Edwig van Hooydonck after being distanced on the final climb.

Participating in Gent–Wevelgem for the third time, Konyshev finished in the main peloton, sprinting to 12th, 17 seconds down on the winner.

The next classic on the schedule was La Flèche Wallonne. With 22 km to go in the race, there was a trio of riders 16 seconds ahead of the chase bunch, where Konyshev was one of 20 riders. With 17 km to go, Gianni Bugno's team started chasing hard. With 4 km to go, the breakaway had won the race with the chase group fighting for the remaining positions. With the finish being up a hill, the chasing bunch came down to a straight sprint, where Konyshev came 14th in the race, 1' 03" down on the winners.

Liège–Bastogne–Liège was won by another breakaway, with Konyshev coming home 20th, over 10 minutes down.

The sixth and final spring classic for Konyshev this season was Eschborn–Frankfurt, where he finished in the main peloton in 13th position. Konyshev's first win of the season came at Giro del Friuli, a one-day race where he won the reduced bunch uphill sprint.

It was then off to the Giro d'Italia, where Konyshev had a very poor performance compared to recent years. His best result was 14th in Stage 5. He would abandon the race during Stage 14. He did not race again until early June at Euskal Bizikleta, where he achieved eighth in Stage 4's sprint.

Konyshev's team only got an invite to the 1995 Tour de France in the week before the race began, as the Le Groupement team folded. Konyshev was named co-leader with Zenon Jaskula. Konyshev did not achieve any notable results in the Tour and abandoned the race during Stage 12.

Konyshev did not race for a month until late August at the Championship of Zurich, where he finished 84th, almost 6 minutes down.

He completed two more races in August: The GP Ouest–France, where he came fourth, and Trittico Premondiale I, where he came sixth.

In October, he rode the road race at the 1995 UCI Road World Championships, finishing in seventh. Konyshev closed his season with a fifth place in Giro del Piemonte, followed by 19th in Giro di Lombardia.

==== 1996: Completing GT Stage triple ====
1996 was Konyshev's fourth and final year at Aki–Gipiemme. His first race for the year was Tour du Haut Var, where he finished 17th in the bunch sprint.

The first stage race of the season was Volta a la Comunitat Valenciana. With the main GC men winning Stage 1 by over 11 minutes, the first seven places were decided from day one. Konyshev sprinted to fifth in the second stage and seventh in the fourth stage, moving him to tenth overall, dropping to 11th after the Tour.

He did not race again until May, at the Giro del Trentino. Stage 2 of the race ended in a bunch sprint, with Konyshev coming the closest so far to a victory, beaten by the slimmest of margins by Fabiano Fontanelli.

Entering his sixth Giro d'Italia, Konyshev was named as leader for his team. His only top 10 came in Stage 3, where he sprinted to seventh place. Konyshev did not start Stage 17 of the Giro.

Seven days later, he started the Tour de Suisse, finishing 12 seconds down on fellow countryman Evgeni Berzin in the opening prologue. Stage 2 was a mountain stage, where Konyshev took the early break. He spent 80 km alone before being joined by others. Konyshev spent other stages in the break, which gave him points in the mountain classification, where he finished second behind teammate Andrey Teteryuk.

He then headed home for the Russian National Road Race Championships, where he placed third.

Before heading to the Summer Olympics, he raced in Germany. At the LUK Cup Bühl, he sprinted to second of three from an original breakaway of seven riders who attacked on lap four of 11.

The last race before the Olympics was the Hofbrau Cup, a four-stage race. Konyshev won the first stage in a two-man sprint over two minutes ahead of the third-placed rider. He held the lead for the whole race, which was solidified by winning Stage 4 once again in a two-up sprint.

The 1996 Olympics were the first Olympic Games since 1912 where Russia participated separately from other countries. Konyshev was one of five Russian Cyclists selected to ride the Men's individual road race. He was the best-placed Russian in the race, finishing 13th out of the 117 that finished.

Returning to Europe, Konyshev headed to Spain for the one-day Clásica de San Sebastián, where he did not feature and finished 47th.

Staying in Spain, he headed to the Tour of Galicia, where a third place in stage one gave him tenth overall.

He rode three more races in August: Coppa Agostoni, Grand Prix de Suisse, and the Giro del Veneto, with his best placing being tenth in Veneto and worst being 18th in Agostoni.

On 7 September, the Vuelta a España started. Konyshev wore the number 11 as the leader of his Aki–Gipiemme team. A flat 162 km stage started the Vuelta, with Konyshev finishing 23rd. Stage 2 was another flat stage, resulting in a bunch sprint where he came 12th, moving him to 14th in the overall classification. Stage 3 ended with Konyshev sprinting to fifth place, moving him into sixth place overall. With 700m to go in Stage 6, Konyshev attacked, only for Italian Fabio Baldato to pass him just before the line, denying him victory.

Another sprint ended Stage 7, with Konyshev placing sixth. It wasn't until 25 September, during Stage 18, that Konyshev would feature again, where he attacked in the middle of the stage, forming a group of four riders. These four riders would gain an advantage of four minutes on the peloton and ride to the finish together. Konyshev was able to outsprint his companions, taking his first Vuelta Stage victory and completing the triple for winning a stage in each Grand Tour. After the Vuelta, on 29 September, Konyshev was 35th overall and placed third in the mountains classification, 70 points behind winner Tony Rominger.

Konyshev rode three more races in the 1996 season, the first being Paris–Tours, where he finished 31st, then the world championships, and finally the Giro di Lombardia, where he came in 12th, 8:26 down on the winner.

=== Roslotto-ZG Mobili (1997) ===
After four years with Aki–Gipiemme, Konyshev moved to Russian-sponsored Italian Team Roslotto–ZG Mobili.

He started his season in February, at Clàssica Comunitat Valenciana 1969, where he finished 85th in the mass bunch sprint for the line.

His first signs of success in 1997 occurred at the Volta a la Comunitat Valenciana, where he sprinted to fifth in Stage 2, to sit 7 seconds down at the end of Stage 4. He lost time in the Stage 5b time trial and finished 24th overall, 2' 11" down on the winner.

In Spain, he rode the Clásica de Almería. Leading out teammate Massimo Strazzer to victory, Konyshev managed to finish 12th.

His first stage race of the season was Vuelta a Murcia. There, Konyshev was a domestique for leader Strazzer and therefore did not feature in Stage 1. However, in Stage 2, the main contenders escaped on the climbs and Konyshev was able to sprint to seventh in the peloton, over 2 minutes down. Konyshev was then able to sprint to second in the following Stage; after leading out Strazzer for the win, he had to brake to let Strazzer win. On stage 4, Konyshev was led out by Pavel Padrnos and took his first victory of the season. During the final Stage, Konyshev sat in sixth position, 2 minutes down. He lost 2' 37" in the time trial, dropping down to 16th position overall. However, Konyshev did win the Green Points jersey because of his performance.

His next race was the 'Race of the Two Seas' better known as Tirreno–Adriatico. Konyshev did not feature in the results until the final stages. Stage 5 ended in a mass sprint, with Konyshev sprinting to tenth. Stage 6 brought his second win of the season. He attacked and finished 12 seconds ahead of the peloton on the hilly stage.

The first Classic for 1997 was the Milan–San Remo. Konyshev was marked as a 3-star favourite for the race. Konyshev and Andrea Ferrigato attacked on the Poggio but did not achieve a gap on the peloton. Konyshev came home in 24th place as part of the 39 riders who made it to the line together.

The following week, he went to E3 Prijs Vlaanderen, where Strazzer led the team, finishing in tenth with Konyshev in the peloton, over three minutes behind.

The final race of March was the Grand Prix de Wallonie, a hilly classic of 199 km. Konyshev came to the finish line with Laurent Madouas, whom he was able to beat in the two-up sprint to take his third victory of the season.

Konyshev next raced in the Spring Classics in Belgium. The first race was the Tour of Flanders, where he finished 29th, 4' 30" down on the winner.

The next races were the La Flèche Wallonne and Liège–Bastogne–Liège, where he came 90th and 52nd respectively.

Next, Konyshev headed to Switzerland to ride the GP Kanton Aargau, coming third in the bunch sprint. In the Tour de Romandie, he came home 72nd overall, not placing in any stage.

The 1997 Giro d'Italia was Konyshev's seventh Tour of Italy. Stage 1 was a flat stage for the sprinters, with Konyshev attacking 64 km into the stage to make it into the breakaway. He was caught by the peloton before the finish, as the Saeco–Estro team worked hard for Mario Cipollini. Konyshev was first through the Intergiro sprint, which meant he led the Intergiro competition. With his sprint, he also took some bonus seconds. He finished the stage in 162nd, 20 seconds down with bonus seconds, which placed him 38th overall, 26 seconds down on Cipollini.

Konyshev lost 42 seconds in Stage 2 and over three and a half minutes in the Stage 3 individual time trial. These losses solidified his position as a domestique for team leaders Piotr Ugrumov and Paolo Savoldelli. He spent the rest of the Giro getting into the break and solidifying his lead in the Intergiro classification. He finished seventh in Stage 6, coming to the line with the peloton for the bunch sprint. Stage 9 was won by Konyshev taking the mass bunch sprint after a hilly stage to take his third Giro stage. By the end of Stage 19, Konyshev had secured his victory in the Intergiro classification. He finished the Giro in 37th overall.

Konyshev did not enter another race until the Clásica de San Sebastián in August, which he did not finish.

Later in August, he rode the Trofeo Melinda. He sprinted to third in the second bunch, coming 29th overall.

September brought the Tour de Pologne, where Konyshev's Roslotto–ZG Mobili team had last year's winner, Viatcheslav Djavanian. Konyshev won Stage 6 of the race from a two-man breakaway with Kazakhstani Alexandre Vinokourov. The pair finished 28 seconds ahead of the peloton. Stage 7 ended in a mass sprint, with Konyshev being led out to aim for victory, but he was no match for Markus Zberg, who took the stage ahead of Konyshev.

At the Giro del Lazio, Konyshev was in the front group of the race until he was distanced on the final climb, finishing 20 seconds down in tenth position.

Konyshev ended his 1997 season in October with the road race at the UCI Road World Championships, which he did not finish.

=== Mercatone Uno (1998 to 1999) ===
==== 1998: Pantani's Giro Tour double ====
In his tenth season, Konyshev moved to the Mercatone Uno–Bianchi team as a domestique to Marco Pantani, whilst still being able to occasionally ride for himself.

His first race with this new team was the Volta a la Comunitat Valenciana. Konyshev was allowed to ride for himself on the fourth stage. He won stage 4 of the Tour in a two-man sprint in an uphill stage, his only win of the season. Pantani lost over 21 minutes in this stage, making Konyshev the new team leader, where he finished 24th overall after the 5 days of racing.

The next race was the Spanish one-day Clásica de Almería, where Mercatone came into the race with both Pantani and sprinter Mario Traversoni as leaders. The race was calm until the midpoint, where strong crosswinds split the group apart. Konyshev was in the front group with his teammates. The finish came down to a reduced bunch sprint, where he led out Traversoni for the win. Konyshev finished 5th in this race.

Once again with the plan to work for Pantani, Konyshev started the Vuelta a Murcia. In Stage 1, Konyshev worked for Traversoni, who finished the stage in fourth. Stage 2 was won by Traversoni. The third stage is where the bigger hills arrived, and an attack by Pantani had allowed a group of 20 to be off the front. Konyshev was part of this group. The 20 men came to the line together, with Konyshev sprinting to fourth. Stage 4a was a short mountain climb where Konyshev lost almost four minutes to the winner, dropping to 23rd overall. He did not start the final stage of the race.

The next race was in Italy for Tirreno–Adriatico. Stage 1 ended in a mass sprint, with Konyshev coming in eighth. During Stage 2, the rain affected the whole stage of the race. The rain led to a major crash around 50 km from the finish and involved around 128 riders. Konyshev was caught up in the crash. At the site, many riders asked the organisers to stop the race to allow those behind the crash to catch up. Their requests were denied, so the 125-strong group rode to the finish together. These riders experienced more bad luck, with more crashes throughout the stage. This resulted in them finishing outside of the time limit, and the race organiser kicked 125 riders from starting Stage 3.

Konyshev was chosen to ride Milan–San Remo as his first cycling classic of the year. He finished over six minutes down in 89th.

The only race he rode in April was the Amstel Gold Race. Konyshev had podiumed this race in 1992. Konyshev abandoned the race during the climb of the Loorberg, within the first hours of the race.

In preparation to help Pantani win the 1998 Giro d'Italia, Konyshev went to the Tour de Romandie, where he finished 104th. The Giro started with an 8 km prologue in France, Konyshev finishing 39 seconds down in 77th. During this tour, Konyshev worked solely for Pantani, who was able to win the overall classification of the race.

Konyshev would ride again in support of Pantani at another Grand Tour, the 1998 Tour de France. Before the Tour started, Konyshev headed back to Russia to ride the Russian National Road Race Championships. He came away with a bronze medal, finishing third 1' 26" down on winner Sergei Ivanov.

The Tour de France started in Ireland with a prologue where Konyshev finished in 151st. He abandoned the Tour on Stage 10. The day before, he had been one of the last to finish in the heat and was last on the overall classification.

Konyshev rode two more races in 1998: the Clásica de San Sebastián and the Grand Prix de Suisse. His best result was in the Grand Prix de Suisse, where he came home in the second bunch sprinting to 14th.

==== 1999: A Fourth Tour Stage ====
Staying with Mercatone Uno–Bianchi for a second season, Konyshev started 1999 at the Trofeo Luis Puig in Spain. The one-day race ended in a mass sprint with Konyshev finishing 97th.

Konyshev had multiple DNF's in Volta a la Comunitat Valenciana, Tirreno–Adriatico and Paris–Roubaix. In those early months, he did, however, finish the Vuelta a Murcia where he came 85th overall while helping Marco Pantani to win the race. This was followed by a poor result in the Amstel Gold Race where he came home in grupetto 9'20" down on the winner, but he did win the sprint in the Gruppeto to finish in 37th.

On the 1st May, Konyshev achieved his best result of the season so far, achieving 11th place in Eschborn–Frankfurt, finishing in the mass sprint.

The next race he entered was the Tour de Romandie, where he came 11th in a mass sprint finish in the final stage.

In June, at the Volta a Catalunya, Konyshev was able to ride for himself. The race started with a Prologue where Konyshev lost over a minute, finishing in 91st. The first stage was flat but with hills near the end, with 7 km to go, Konyshev attacked on one of these hills and he achieved two points in the King of the Mountains classification. The Saeco–Cannondale team worked hard in the peloton for Mario Cipollini, and Konyshev was caught soon after the hill. On Stage 2, Konyshev gained two more points in the KOM classification. On Stage 4, Konyshev gained 20 points in the KOM classification to sit second at the end of the day. On Stage 5, Konyshev came seventh and was still second in the King of the Mountains classification. On Stage 6, Konyshev made his way into the break of the day and won the third and fourth KOM sprints, gaining 16 points and moving him into the red jersey. Stage 7 was an ITT where Konyshev came 44th. Konyshev won the red jersey at the end of the tour for winning the Mountain classification.

The 1999 Tour de France brought with it controversy around doping. With everyone focusing on the Festina affair, the Tour started without many large contenders. Konyshev's Mercatone Uno–Bianchi team started with Stefano Garzelli as leader, while Pantani was recovering from his expulsion from the 1999 Giro d'Italia.

The prologue of the Tour had a hill in the middle, and the fastest times up the hill got Mountain points. Konyshev had the second fastest time, resulting in him gaining 3 points in the Mountains classification, classified second behind Mariano Piccoli. At the finish line, Konyshev set the 162nd best time losing 1' 08" to Lance Armstrong. Konyshev spent a lot of the Tour going into the break and gaining Mountain points. He never wore the Mountain jersey at the Tour, and he always sat no higher than second. In Stage 11, Konyshev was in the break, taking mountain points when Ludo Dierckxsens attacked. Konyshev could not follow, resulting in Dierckxsens making it to the line first with Konyshev winning the four-way sprint for second place. Stage 14 started with a crash at 7 kilometers into the stage and shortly afterwards, Konyshev initiated a breakaway. After 55 kilometers, four riders joined him, forming a group of six. With 36 kilometers to go, the gap was 14 minutes to the peloton. Gianni Faresin attacked with 4 kilometers to go, where only Konyshev could follow. Faresin ended up leading to the finish until Konyshev came around him with 400m to go, taking his fourth Stage win at the Tour de France. Konyshev came 18th on the final stage of the tour, setting his 62nd overall in stone.

Following on from the Tour, Konyshev didn't race any more stage races, instead focusing only on one-day events.

The first one was the Clásica de San Sebastián, where he came home in the second peloton 3' 14" down.

Konychev achieved a victory in the Grand Prix de Fourmies. He made it into the move of the day, an 11-man group with two former winners. The 11 worked together with the group breaking apart at the end of the race, so it came down to a six-man sprint. Konyshev was the fastest, taking his second win of the season.

Keeping his good form, Konyshev raced the Giro del Lazio. He took third behind his teammate, who won from an attack from 2 km before the line. The good results continued with another stage win. Konyshev once again made it into the winning move, this time with nine riders who all worked well together until Marco Serpellini attacked. Konyshev was the only one who could follow; the two battled it out in the closing kilometres with Konyshev taking the victory in the sprint.

The next race was the Road race at the 1999 UCI Road World Championships. The course was 16 laps, equaling 260 km. With three laps to go, Konyshev was part of a group of seven who joined up with the group of six riders at the front. On the final lap, only nine riders remained, with Konyshev being thought of as the favourite to win. Óscar Freire attacked and won the race by four seconds, with Konyshev finishing in ninth place.

The final two races of the season were Milano–Torino, where he sprinted to seventh, and the Giro di Lombardia. With 43 km to go in the Giro di Lombardia, a group of five had a 30-second lead over a 24-man chase group. On the final climb, Konyshev and Mirko Celestino were distanced only to slowly catch up, and Celestino sprang past everyone to win. Konyshev was only able to just hold on and take fifth in the race.

=== Fassa Bortolo (2000 to 2002) ===
==== 2000: Winning the Cyclamen jersey ====
The start of the 21st Century brought a new team, Fassa Bortolo, to the top division of cycling and a new team for Konyshev. The Russian Cycling Federation owed money relating to Konyshev's old team Roslotto–ZG Mobili, for which he rode in 1997. This meant that UCI was going to exclude Russian riders from entering the 2000 Summer Olympics. An official decision was made in early 2000 stating that Russian riders should not be punished and that all Russian athletes could compete at all international events.

The first race of the season for Konyshev was at La Méditerranéenne, where he finished 130th, finishing over 34 minutes down from the leader.

This race was followed by the Trofeo Luis Puig and Volta a la Comunitat Valenciana. Konyshev got a top-10 in Stage Four of the latter.

In March, Konyshev competed in the Trofeo Pantalica, where he finished 5th, an improved performance on recent races.

The next day, he rode the Giro della Provincia di Siracusa, finishing fifth in the bunch sprint after leading out teammate Gabriele Balducci for third.

Staying in Italy, Konyshev headed to Tirreno–Adriatico where he achieved the best result of the season so far, he sprinted to fourth in Stage One. He would finish the race 55th overall after eight stages.

The first Classic of the year for Konyshev was Milan–San Remo, he sprinted to 20th while leading out Fabio Baldato, who came second.

The following month, he raced the Tour of Flanders, once again working for Baldato. The race finished with a solo winner followed by a mass bunch sprint with Konyshev coming home in 13th.

The 'Hell of the North' was the next race for Konyshev. He was riding in his third Paris–Roubaix. Konyshev was part of a twelve-man break that got away after 35 km. After 171 km of racing, the break had been reduced to four riders, with Konyshev still in the group. After 194 km of racing, they were caught, and Konyshev held on for as long as he could, coming home in 25th, 3' 17" down on the winner. At Liège–Bastogne–Liège, the Amstel Gold Race and Eschborn–Frankfurt he came 70th, 48th and 55th respectively.

His first victory of the season came at the Tour de Romandie. After Stage 1, Konyshev had lost over 50 seconds and finished the first stage in 122nd position. In stage 2, Konyshev was in the break of the day, gaining 10 points in the points classification before being caught and coming home in 68th. Konyshev came second on Stage 3 of the Tour after Eddy Mazzoleni (Team Polti) managed to hold the peloton off by three seconds. On the final stage of the Tour, the race had sprints in the middle of the stage, which counted towards the sprint classification. Konyshev won both of these and secured his victory in the Sprints classification.

After the Tour de Romandie, Konyshev rode the 2000 Giro d'Italia, initially he was supporting Fabio Baldato, however, Baldato suffered a bad crash in Stage 2 and did not start Stage 3. With Baltado out of the Giro, Konyshev led out Matteo Tosatto for the sprints in Stages 2 and 3. In Stage 3, Tosatto misjudged the leadout by Konyshev, leading to a fourth in the stage but taking the Maglia ciclamino as leader of the points classification. Stage 4 ended a mass bunch sprint with Konyshev sprinting to second behind Mario Cipollini, gaining 20 points and moving to tenth in the points classification.

Stage 6 of the Giro was an uphill mass sprint where it came down to two men, Konyshev and Jeroen Blijlevens. Blijlevens thought he could catch Konyshev; however, he finished second, a whole wheel length behind. Konyshev had won his fourth and final stage in the Giro d'Italia. The following day, Stage 7, was another flat stage but this time it ended with a solo breakaway. When the peloton came to the line, Konyshev took second in the mass sprint, gaining 16 points in the points classification. In the intermediate sprint, Konyshev was able to gain 6 points, which moved him into the Maglia ciclamino. In Stage 9, Konyshev gained 6 points by finishing second in the intermediate sprint. Stage 10 ended in a mass sprint with Konyshev sprinting to seventh.

Stage 12 brought the Giro to the mountains, and with that, Konyshev made it into the break of the day with 23 other men. With Konyshev wanting the day to end in a sprint, he chased down many attacks over the day. But as the group reached the top of the only climb that day, three riders attacked and gained a gap of 1' 10" by the summit. Konyshev slowly and surely paced them down, creating a bunch sprint of 13 where he came in third. He gained 20 points at this stage, strengthening his lead in the points classification.

During Stage 13, Konyshev was in the break of the day, gaining second in the intermediate sprint but then dropping on some of the steeper climbs. Stage 16 was the next chance for Konyshev, where the finish is flat and teammate Alessandro Petacchi led him out perfectly, only for Konyshev to be blocked by a rider going back through the bunch. The final stage of the Giro, Stage 21, ended in the unusual way that a breakaway won the stage Konyshev came second in the peloton and seventh on the stage. By finishing the race, he won the Points classification by 40 points, and he also won the award for being the most combative rider.

Konyshev did not race again until the Vuelta a Burgos in August, where his top result was 17th on the final stage, finishing 97th overall. Following him not finishing the Clásica de San Sebastián and Züri-Metzgete, he rode the Giro del Veneto, where he finished over eight minutes down in 66th.

In September, he rode the Giro della Romagna and won the mass sprint finish to claim his second non-classification win of the season. The next week he rode the Brussels Cycling Classic which ended in a mass sprint where Konyshev came tenth.

His two last top 10 results of the season came in Coppa Sabatini, where he came eighth and tenth at the Olympic Games Road race. Konyshev was part of a 5-man team selected to represent Russia at the Olympic Games in the road race. He was active during the race, attacking at the end of lap 8, starting a break of 5 men who were ultimately caught by the next lap. By the end of lap 11, a 12-man break had formed with Konyshev in the mix. Three riders from Team Telekom attacked and kept away with Konyshev in the sprint for fourth. He ended in tenth place 1' 26" down on winner Jan Ullrich.

==== 2001: Second Russian victory ====
Konyshev started his 2001 season with a Team Fassa Bortolo training camp in Tuscany. It was his second year with the Italian team, at 35 years old he was the oldest in the team for the 2001 season. Konyshev started racing in France with the La Méditerranéenne, where he finished 88th at the completion of the six-stage race.

Konyshev's first podium of the season came from a sprint in Stage 2 of the Giro della Liguria, where Italian Stefano Zanini (Mapei–Quick-Step) beat him on the line, He finished the race 18th overall.

At the beginning of March at the GP Open Campania, Konyshev took his first victory of the season, winning from a reduced bunch sprint. A week later at the Giro della Provincia di Siracusa, Konyshev finished in the main peloton, where an error in the finishing camera equipment meant everyone past eighth place was given eighth place.

The first major stage race that Konyshev raced that year was Tirreno–Adriatico. The eight-stage race started with a flat stage ending in a bunch sprint. Biagio Conte (Saeco) took the win ahead of Konyshev. Stage 2 also ended in a sprint with Konyshev coming home fifth and dropping to third overall. In Stage 3, Konyshev once again came second in the final sprint, this time gaining enough time to take the leader's jersey and enough points to take the Points jersey also. With one kilometer to go in Stage 4, four riders went up the road winning by five seconds over the peloton, Konyshev finished second. He lost his lead in the race to Davide Rebellin (Liquigas–Pata) and then was three seconds down. Stage 5 was an Individual time trial. Konyshev did not finish in the top 10; however, he kept his lead in the points classification. Konyshev crashed out of the race on Stage 5 while in the points jersey.

The next race was the cycling monument Milan–San Remo, Konyshev was amongst the favorites at the end of the race only to be caught in a large crash in the final kilometre. He crossed the line in 120th and after being assessed by doctors was found to have a fractured radius, he did not race again until the end of April.

His first race back after injury was the Amstel Gold Race, where he did not finish the race. Two days later he rode the Giro del Trentino in support of Francesco Casagrande who won the race overall. The next result for Konyshev was fifth in Stage 5 of the Tour de Romandie.

Konyshev only rode one Grand Tour in 2001 the Giro d'Italia where he was there to try and defend his Points jersey from the 2000 Giro d'Italia. He achieved two top 10 results in the race and placed eighth in Stage 8 in a bunch sprint. In Stage 19, he came fifth in the bunch sprint at the end. This would be the closest he would come to a Giro Stage win this year.

Following the Giro, he went to Switzerland to race the Tour de Suisse. On stage 5 of the race, Konyshev was in the break of the day, staying there until the first pass of Saint-Gotthard Massif, where he accelerated away from his breakaway companions. With 5 km to go, his lead was 5 minutes. By the finish, his lead had been reduced to 1' 57" but he won the stage and also pulled on the Mountain jersey after taking 90 points in the stage. He had spent 195 km of the 220 km stage at the front of the group. The final stage of the race, Stage 10, was 175.9 km long. Konyshev was in a break with five other riders who stayed away the whole stage, with Konyshev leading the sprint to the line, only to finish fourth. His 90 points in Stage 5 allowed him to hold the Mountain jersey to the end.

Konyshev took his second victory at the Russian National Road Race Championships by attacking from a small group up the final climb. He won by 7 seconds.

The final stage race that Konyshev rode in 2001 was the Volta a Portugal, where he did not finish.

It wasn't until September that he was unable to get back-to-back victories in the Giro della Romagna, but he did manage to finish seventh in the sprint. Konyshev missed the move in the final kilometers of Giro del Lazio but sprinted to third on the line. His final win of the season came at Coppa Sabatini, a race he had won in 1999.

==== 2002: Final Giro ====
The final season at Fassa Bortolo for Konyshev was statistically his worst season since he turned professional in 1989; he did not record a single win.

Konyshev started his season at the Vuelta a Andalucía, where he was very active in the breakaway,1 eventually finishing 128th overall.

He came close a few times in the season with three top fives in stages and a further two top 10s in one-day races. In his second race of the season the Volta a la Comunitat Valenciana he sprinted to second behind teammate Alessandro Petacchi. A fourth at Stage 2 of Volta a Catalunya. His final top five placing came at the Giro della Provincia di Lucca where he came fifth in the sprint of Stage 3.

The two one day events Konyshev did well in were Eschborn–Frankfurt where he placed ninth in the bunch sprint. His final top 10 came at Gran Premio Industria e Commercio di Prato where he sprinted to seventh.

The 2002 Giro d'Italia was the last Grand Tour for Konyshev, 13 years after he first rode the Giro in 1989. In Stage 2, Konyshev crashed in the final 2 km; he was not badly injured and finished the stage over three minutes down. During stage 4 he got in a breakaway with Daniele Contrini and stayed away for 90 km only caught with 30 km to go, Konyshev finished 189th on the stage over 13 minutes down. Konyshev finished the Giro in 103rd place overall, over two hours down on winner Paolo Savoldelli.

=== Marlux-Wincor Nixdorf (2003) ===
After three years at Fassa Bortolo, Konyshev joined the second division team Marlux–Wincor Nixdorf. His first race was in Italy, the Gran Premio della Costa Etruschi, where he finished in 64th. Konyshev had a pinched nerve in his back and he spent a few months early in the season off his bike. At 37 years of age, Konyshev was the Road captain of the team, while riding for team leader Dave Bruylandts at Schynberg Rundfahrt Konyshev managed to finish seventh on the hilly course. His final good result of the season came at the Gran Premio Industria e Commercio Artigianato Carnaghese, where he was once again helping Bruylandts, and he finished seventh.

=== LPR - Nava (2004 to 2006) ===
==== 2004: Back to winning ====
At the start of the 2004 season, Konyshev joined LPR–Piacenza, a new Second division Italian team. Konyshev ended his drought of no wins for the past two years.

Konyshev was arrested in January for allegedly assaulting and robbing a prostitute in Italy. Two of his teammates, Ruslan Pidhornyy and Yuriy Ivanov, were dropped from the team due to the incident while Konyshev and Andrey Karpachev were still part of the team. All four riders missed the team presentation in Piacenza, as the team had suspended them at the time.

Konyshev was cleared by the team to start his 2004 season at Trofeo Laigueglia, where he finished 32nd in the mass bunch sprint. In March, Konyshev came to light with a third place at Giro della Provincia di Reggio Calabria, followed by seventh at Stausee-Rundfahrt Klingnau. In April, at the Tour du Lac Léman, he ended his drought and took his first win in over two years from a reduced bunch sprint.

Konychev achieved a third place in a sprint at the Giro di Toscana. In the Vuelta a Asturias, Konyshev won the bunch sprint behind solo winner Carlos Barredo on Stage 3. The following month he rode another Spanish Stage-race, the Euskal Bizikleta, where he won the mass bunch sprint of Stage 4a, taking his second win of the season.

Following this race, he only rode one-day races for the remainder of the season. The first was Giro d'Oro where he placed fourth and the second was the Coppa Sabatini, where he sprinted to tenth in a reduced bunch and finished behind a trio led by Jan Ullrich. His final race of the 2004 season was the Road race at the UCI Road World Championships where he placed 25th winning the sprint of the peloton.

==== 2005: Back to the Mountains ====
Remaining with LPR–Piacenza for a second season, Konyshev started the year at the Grand Prix La Marseillaise where he did not finish. As a UCI Professional Continental team LPR–Piacenza was able to get invites to UCI World Tour events, one such event was Milan–San Remo where Konyshev had finished seventh in 1995. This year, he finished in 115th, coming home over seven minutes down on the winner.

The first race where Konyshev had some good results was Settimana Internazionale di Coppi e Bartali. He was considered a strong rider by Cyclingnews.com in their preview for the race. During Stage 1a of the race, Konyshev attacked and went solo off the front, he held the peloton off until the last lap of the course where he was caught and managed to finish 44th. He did, however, pull on the King of the Mountains jersey for most mountain points. After missing the breakaway on Stage 2 Konyshev made it to Stage 3 where he won the mountain sprint putting him back into the lead of the KOM classification. After five stages of racing, Konyshev was still in the lead of the Mountains classification so took home the green KOM jersey.

Two days later, he rode the Giro della Provincia di Reggio Calabria, where he placed ninth in the bunch sprint. In May, he raced the Giro di Toscana, where he placed fourth, while teammate Mikhaylo Khalilov placed second.

He would not feature in results until the Vuelta a Asturias in mid-June, where Konyshev won the first stage from a reduced peloton on the hilly course. He held the leader's jersey after the Stage 2 mass sprint, where he finished third. When the race reached the hills in the following stages, Konyshev lost over 24 minutes before pulling out in Stage 5.

Konyshev extended his contract with LPR–Piacenza for one more year.

==== 2006: The end of an era ====
Starting his final season as a professional, Konyshev would be the second-oldest cyclist in the peloton at 40 years of age. His third and final year at Team LPR began at the Grand Prix La Marseillaise. Konyshev finished two races and six stages over the 2006 season with his best result being 44th in Stage 2 of Étoile de Bessèges.

During this year, Konyshev did not achieve many of the results he had in previous years; however, he still participated in many prestigious races. He competed in Milan–San Remo, finishing in 149th, more than nine minutes behind the winner. Konyshev was the team's second leader in the race, but ultimately sacrificed his chances to support Mikhaylo Khalilov, who finished 77th.

Konyshev's final UCI ProTour race was the Tour de Romandie. Konyshev was very active in the race, although during the Stage 1 prologue, he finished second to last losing 53 seconds to the winner. During the second stage, Konyshev attacked 26 km into the 169 km race and built a lead of over nine minutes, after 76 km. After spending 120 km alone in the lead, he was caught by the Davitamon–Lotto led peloton. He finished the stage more than four minutes down but behind but started the next day wearing the Mountains jersey. Paying for his effort in Stage 2, Konyshev struggled throughout the entire stage, finishing in last place, 13 minutes behind the winner. He abandoned the race during Stage 3 after struggling in the second stage.

The final race of his career was the 2006 Paris–Roubaix.

== Post racing career ==
Following his retirement in 2006, Konyshev joined Tinkoff Credit Systems as sports director. He was part of the team which supported Alexandr Kolobnev in earning his silver medal in the UCI Road World Championships Men's road race.

In 2009, he was made the head coach of the Russian National cycling team.

== Career achievements ==
1986
1st Stage 10 Coors Classic
3rd Soviet National Road Race Championships
1987
1st Overall USSR Tour
1st Overall Österreich-Rundfahrt

1st Stage 3

1st Overall Giro delle Regioni

1st Stages 2, 4 & 6

Tour de l'Avenir

1st Points classification
1st Stage 6

1st Gran Premio della Liberazione
1st GP Palio del Recioto
5th Overall Tour of Sochi

1st Stage 6

8th Overall Peace Race
1988
1st Overall Giro Ciclistico d'Italia

1st Stages 2, 4 & 6

1st Stage 2 (Team time trial) Tour de Pologne
1st Stages 3 & 5 Giro delle Regioni
Vuelta a Cuba

1st Points classification
1st Stages 4 & 11

3rd Gran Premio della Liberazione
3rd Overall Tour of Sochi
1989
1st Coppa Ugo Agostoni
1st Giro dell'Emilia
1st Overall Cronostafetta
1st Mountain classification, Tour of Belgium
2nd Road race, UCI Road World Championships
2nd Giro di Toscana
2nd Trittico Premondiale I
3rd Overall Settimana Ciclistica Lombarda

1st Stage 2

4th Gran Premio Città di Camaiore
6th Trittico Premondiale
7th Trofeo Baracchi
1990
1st Soviet National Road Race Championships
1st Stage 17 Tour de France
1st GP Industria & Artigianato di Larciano
4th Giro del Veneto
8th Gent–Wevelgem
9th Giro di Toscana
10th Dwars door België
1991
1st Stages 19 & 22 Tour de France
1st Stage 3 Tirreno–Adriatico
5th La Flèche Wallonne
5th GP de la Liberation (TTT)
6th Trittico Premondiale I
8th Overall Critérium International
8th Grand Prix Cerami
1992
1st Stage 6 Vuelta a Asturias
2nd Road race, National Road Championships
3rd Road race, UCI Road World Championships
3rd Amstel Gold Race
4th Clásica de San Sebastián
1993
1st Road race, National Road Championships
1st Stages 5 & 12 Giro d'Italia
4th Gran Piemonte
4th Giro di Romagna
9th Giro di Lombardia
1994
1st Stage 1 Ronde van Nederland
3rd Trittico Premondiale
4th Giro di Lombardia
5th Road race, UCI Road World Championships
5th Gran Premio Città di Camaiore
5th Giro del Lazio
6th Giro del Friuli
7th Gent–Wevelgem
8th Milano–Torino
8th Rund um den Henninger Turm
9th Firenze–Pistoia
1995
1st Giro del Friuli
3rd Overall Tirreno–Adriatico
3rd Brabantse Pijl
4th Overall Tour Méditerranéen
4th GP Ouest–France
5th Gran Piemonte
6th Trittico Premondiale I
7th Road race, UCI Road World Championships
7th Milan–San Remo
9th Nice–Alassio
1996
1st Overall Hofbrau Cup

1st Stages 1 & 4

1st Stage 18 Vuelta a España
2nd Buhl International
3rd Road race, National Road Championships
10th Overall Tour of Galicia
10th Giro del Veneto
1997
1st Grand Prix de Wallonie
Giro d'Italia

1st Intergiro classification
1st Stage 9

1st Stage 6 Tirreno–Adriatico
1st Stage 6 Tour de Pologne
Vuelta a Murcia

1st Points classification
1st Stage 4

3rd GP du canton d'Argovie
10th Giro del Lazio
1998
1st Stage 4 Volta a la Comunitat Valenciana
3rd Road race, National Road Championships
5th Clasica de Almeria
1999
1st Coppa Sabatini
1st Grand Prix de Fourmies
1st Stage 14 Tour de France
1st Mountains classification Volta a Catalunya
3rd Giro del Lazio
5th Giro di Lombardia
7th Milano–Torino
9th Road race, UCI Road World Championships
2000
1st Giro della Romagna
Giro d'Italia

1st Points classification
1st Stage 6

1st Sprint classification Tour de Romandie
5th Trofeo Pantalica
5th Giro della Provincia di Siracusa
8th Coppa Sabatini
10th Road race, Summer Olympics
10th Brussels Cycling Classic
2001
1st Road race, National Road Championships
1st Coppa Sabatini
1st Giro di Campania
Tour de Suisse

1st Mountains classification
1st Stage 5

3rd Giro del Lazio
6th Gran Premio Bruno Beghelli
7th Giro di Romagna
8th Giro della Provincia di Siracusa
2002
7th GP Industria & Commercio di Prato
9th Rund um den Henninger Turm
2003
5th Schynberg Rundfahrt
7th GP Industria Artigianato e Commercio Carnaghese
2004
1st Tour du Lac Léman
1st Stage 4a Euskal Bizikleta
3rd Giro di Toscana
3rd Giro della Provincia di reggio Calabria
4th Giro d'Oro
7th Stausee Rundfahrt
10th Coppa Sabatini
2005
1st Stage 1 Vuelta a Asturias
1st Mountain classification Settimana Internazionale di Coppi e Bartali
4th Giro di Toscana
9th Giro della Provincia di reggio Calabria

=== General classification results timeline ===
Grand Tour general classification results
Grand Tour	1989	1990	1991	1992	1993	1994	1995	1996	1997	1998	1999	2000	2001	2002	2003	2004	2005	2006
Giro d'Italia	DNF	30	—	—	26	DNF	DNF	DNF	37	51	—	57	75	103	—	—	—	—
Tour de France	—	25	52	DNF	—	—	DNF	—	—	DNF	62	—	—	—	—	—	—	—
/ Vuelta a España	—	—	DNF	DNF	—	—	—	35	—	—	—	—	—	—	—	—	—	—
Major stage race general classification results timeline
Race	1989	1990	1991	1992	1993	1994	1995	1996	1997	1998	1999	2000	2001	2002	2003	2004	2005	2006
Paris–Nice	—	—	—	—	—	—	—	—	—	—	—	—	—	—	—	—	—	—
Tirreno–Adriatico	—	—	32	—	—	26	3	—	—	DNF	DNF	55	DNF	74	—	—	—	—
Volta a Catalunya	—	—	—	—	—	—	—	—	—	DNF	41	—	—	51	—	—	—	—
Tour of the Basque Country	—	—	—	—	DNF	—	—	—	—	—	—	—	—	—	—	—	—	—
Tour de Romandie	—	—	—	—	—	—	—	—	72	104	85	69	79	—	—	—	—	DNF
Critérium du Dauphiné	—	—	—	—	—	—	—	—	—	—	—	—	—	—	—	—	—	—
Tour de Suisse	—	—	—	—	—	—	—	28	—	—	—	—	24	—	—	—	—	—

=== Classics results timeline ===
Monuments by highest finishing position
Monument	1989	1990	1991	1992	1993	1994	1995	1996	1997	1998	1999	2000	2001	2002	2003	2004	2005	2006
Milan–San Remo	—	—	—	84	96	11	7	—	24	89	—	20	120	82	—	—	115	149
Tour of Flanders	—	—	26	16	24	12	—	—	27	—	—	13	—	41	—	—	—	—
Paris–Roubaix	—	—	—	—	—	37	—	—	—	—	DNF	25	—	DNF	—	—	—	104
Liège–Bastogne–Liège	—	—	—	26	33	—	20	—	52	—	—	70	—	—	—	—	—	—
Giro di Lombardia	—	—	—	—	9	4	19	12	—	—	5	DNF	DNF	—	—	—	—	—
Championships results timeline
Championship	1989	1990	1991	1992	1993	1994	1995	1996	1997	1998	1999	2000	2001	2002	2003	2004	2005	2006
National Championships				2				3		3						7		
World Championships	2	30	—	3	50	5	7	DNF	80	—	9	DNF	DNF	19	14	25	—	—

Classics by highest finishing position
Classic	1989	1990	1991	1992	1993	1994	1995	1996	1997	1998	1999	2000	2001	2002	2003	2004	2005	2006
Omloop Het Nieuwsblad	–	–	–	–	–	–	–	–	–	–	–	–	–	–	–	NH	DNF	–
Kuurne–Brussels–Kuurne	–	–	–	–	NH	–	–	–	–	–	–	–	–	–	–	–	–	DNF
E3 Harelbeke	–	–	–	–	24	24	–	–	69	–	–	DNF	–	–	–	–	–	75
Gent–Wevelgem	–	8	–	–	–	7	12	–	–	–	–	–	–	26	–	–	–	–
Amstel Gold Race	–	–	77	3	–	12	–	–	–	DNF	37	48	DNF	–	–	–	–	–
La Flèche Wallonne	–	–	5	44	34	40	14	–	90	–	–	–	–	–	–	–	–	–
Clásica de San Sebastián	–	–	–	4	64	16	–	47	–	66	35	–	–	–	–	–	–	–
Coppa Ugo Agostoni	1	–	–	–	–	–	–	–	–	–	–	–	40	–	–	–	–	–
Paris–Tours	–	–	23	–	–	17	–	31	81	–	72	DNF	DNF	–	–	–	–	–

Legend
—	Did not compete
DNF	Did not finish
NH	Race not held
