= 1993 Giro d'Italia, Stage 11 to Stage 21 =

Cycling race stages

The 1993 Giro d'Italia was the 76th edition of the Giro d'Italia, one of cycling's Grand Tours. The Giro began in Porto Azzurro, with a mountainous stage on 23 May, and Stage 11 occurred on 3 June with a stage from Senigallia. The race finished in Milan on 13 June.

== Stage 11 ==
3 June 1993 — Senigallia to Dozza, 184 km (114 mi)

Stage 11 result

Rank	Rider	Team	Time
1	Fabiano Fontanelli (ITA)	Navigare–Blue Storm	4h 17' 42"
2	Dario Bottaro (ITA)	Mecair–Ballan	+ 4"
3	Valerio Tebaldi (ITA)	Gatorade–Mega Drive–Kenwood	s.t.
4	Mario Manzoni (ITA)	Gatorade–Mega Drive–Kenwood	+ 6"
5	Laurent Pillon (FRA)	GB–MG Maglificio	s.t.
6	Fabio Casartelli (ITA)	Ariostea	+ 8"
7	Stefano Allocchio (ITA)	Lampre–Polti	s.t.
8	Gianluca Bortolami (ITA)	Lampre–Polti	s.t.
9	Fabio Roscioli (ITA)	Carrera Jeans–Tassoni	s.t.
10	Bruno Leali (ITA)	Mercatone Uno–Zucchini–Medeghini	s.t.

General classification after Stage 11

Rank	Rider	Team	Time
1	Bruno Leali (ITA)	Mercatone Uno–Zucchini–Medeghini	46h 37' 57"
2	Miguel Induráin (ESP)	Banesto	+ 6"
3	Marco Giovannetti (ITA)	Mapei–Viner	+ 13"
4	Moreno Argentin (ITA)	Mecair–Ballan	+ 35"
5	Piotr Ugrumov (LAT)	Mecair–Ballan	+ 1' 06"
6	Maurizio Fondriest (ITA)	Lampre–Polti	+ 1' 07"
7	Luca Gelfi (ITA)	Mapei–Viner	+ 1' 26"
8	Claudio Chiappucci (ITA)	Carrera Jeans–Tassoni	+ 1' 29"
9	Massimiliano Lelli (ITA)	Ariostea	+ 2' 00"
10	Gianni Bugno (ITA)	Gatorade–Mega Drive–Kenwood	+ 2' 04"

== Stage 12 ==
4 June 1993 — Dozza to Asiago, 239 km (149 mi)

Stage 12 result

Rank	Rider	Team	Time
1	Dimitri Konyshev (RUS)	Jolly Componibili–Club 88	6h 25' 09"
2	Maurizio Fondriest (ITA)	Lampre–Polti	s.t.
3	Enrico Zaina (ITA)	Mercatone Uno–Zucchini–Medeghini	s.t.
4	Franco Chioccioli (ITA)	GB–MG Maglificio	s.t.
5	Luca Gelfi (ITA)	Mapei–Viner	s.t.
6	Vladimir Poulnikov (UKR)	Carrera Jeans–Tassoni	s.t.
7	Giorgio Furlan (ITA)	Ariostea	s.t.
8	Laurent Brochard (FRA)	Castorama	s.t.
9	Marco Pantani (ITA)	Carrera Jeans–Tassoni	s.t.
10	Fabio Bordonali (ITA)	Mercatone Uno–Zucchini–Medeghini	s.t.

General classification after Stage 12

Rank	Rider	Team	Time
1	Bruno Leali (ITA)	Mercatone Uno–Zucchini–Medeghini	53h 03' 50"
2	Miguel Induráin (ESP)	Banesto	+ 6"
3	Maurizio Fondriest (ITA)	Lampre–Polti	+ 15"
4	Moreno Argentin (ITA)	Mecair–Ballan	+ 19"
5	Piotr Ugrumov (LAT)	Mecair–Ballan	+ 22"
6	Luca Gelfi (ITA)	Mapei–Viner	+ 42"
7	Armand de Las Cuevas (FRA)	Banesto	+ 1' 28"
8	Claudio Chiappucci (ITA)	Carrera Jeans–Tassoni	+ 1' 29"
9	Franco Chioccioli (ITA)	GB–MG Maglificio	+ 1' 31"
10	Giorgio Furlan (ITA)	Ariostea	+ 1' 35"

== Stage 13 ==
5 June 1993 — Asiago to Corvara, 220 km (140 mi)

Stage 13 result

Rank	Rider	Team	Time
1	Moreno Argentin (ITA)	Mecair–Ballan	6h 13' 40"
2	Massimiliano Lelli (ITA)	Ariostea	s.t.
3	Gianni Bugno (ITA)	Gatorade–Mega Drive–Kenwood	s.t.
4	Miguel Induráin (ESP)	Banesto	s.t.
5	Maurizio Fondriest (ITA)	Lampre–Polti	s.t.
6	Bruno Leali (ITA)	Mercatone Uno–Zucchini–Medeghini	s.t.
7	Vladimir Poulnikov (UKR)	Carrera Jeans–Tassoni	s.t.
8	Giorgio Furlan (ITA)	Ariostea	s.t.
9	Andrew Hampsten (USA)	Motorola	s.t.
10	Claudio Chiappucci (ITA)	Carrera Jeans–Tassoni	s.t.

General classification after Stage 13

Rank	Rider	Team	Time
1	Bruno Leali (ITA)	Mercatone Uno–Zucchini–Medeghini	59h 17' 30"
2	Miguel Induráin (ESP)	Banesto	+ 6"
3	Moreno Argentin (ITA)	Mecair–Ballan	+ 7"
4	Maurizio Fondriest (ITA)	Lampre–Polti	+ 15"
5	Piotr Ugrumov (LAT)	Mecair–Ballan	+ 28"
6	Luca Gelfi (ITA)	Mapei–Viner	+ 1' 20"
7	Claudio Chiappucci (ITA)	Carrera Jeans–Tassoni	+ 1' 29"
8	Armand de Las Cuevas (FRA)	Banesto	+ 1' 34"
9	Giorgio Furlan (ITA)	Ariostea	+ 1' 35"
10	Massimiliano Lelli (ITA)	Ariostea	+ 1' 36"

== Stage 14 ==
6 June 1993 — Corvara to Corvara, 245 km (152 mi)

Stage 14 result

Rank	Rider	Team	Time
1	Claudio Chiappucci (ITA)	Carrera Jeans–Tassoni	7h 24' 34"
2	Miguel Induráin (ESP)	Banesto	+ 1"
3	Vladimir Poulnikov (UKR)	Carrera Jeans–Tassoni	s.t.
4	Pavel Tonkov (RUS)	Lampre–Polti	s.t.
5	Massimiliano Lelli (ITA)	Ariostea	s.t.
6	Piotr Ugrumov (LAT)	Mecair–Ballan	+ 20"
7	Nelson Rodríguez (COL)	ZG Mobili	+ 3' 10"
8	Maurizio Fondriest (ITA)	Lampre–Polti	s.t.
9	Andrew Hampsten (USA)	Motorola	+ 3' 48"
10	Flavio Giupponi (ITA)	Mercatone Uno–Zucchini–Medeghini	+ 4' 53"

General classification after Stage 14

Rank	Rider	Team	Time
1	Miguel Induráin (ESP)	Banesto	66h 45' 03"
2	Piotr Ugrumov (LAT)	Mecair–Ballan	+ 49"
3	Claudio Chiappucci (ITA)	Carrera Jeans–Tassoni	+ 1' 18"
4	Massimiliano Lelli (ITA)	Ariostea	+ 1' 38"
5	Vladimir Poulnikov (UKR)	Carrera Jeans–Tassoni	+ 2' 28"
6	Pavel Tonkov (RUS)	Lampre–Polti	+ 3' 08"
7	Maurizio Fondriest (ITA)	Lampre–Polti	+ 3' 26"
8	Stephen Roche (IRL)	Carrera Jeans–Tassoni	+ 6' 39"
9	Moreno Argentin (ITA)	Mecair–Ballan	+ 7' 32"
10	Flavio Giupponi (ITA)	Mercatone Uno–Zucchini–Medeghini	+ 7' 43"

== Stage 15 ==
7 June 1993 — Corvara to Lumezzane, 263 km (163 mi)

Stage 15 result

Rank	Rider	Team	Time
1	Davide Cassani (ITA)	Ariostea	7h 22' 04"
2	Moreno Argentin (ITA)	Mecair–Ballan	+ 46"
3	Flavio Giupponi (ITA)	Mercatone Uno–Zucchini–Medeghini	+ 48"
4	Piotr Ugrumov (LAT)	Mecair–Ballan	s.t.
5	Maurizio Fondriest (ITA)	Lampre–Polti	s.t.
6	Miguel Induráin (ESP)	Banesto	s.t.
7	Claudio Chiappucci (ITA)	Carrera Jeans–Tassoni	s.t.
8	Luis-Felipe Moreno (COL)	Kelme–Xacobeo	+ 53"
9	Laurent Brochard (FRA)	Castorama	+ 59"
10	Pavel Tonkov (RUS)	Lampre–Polti	s.t.

General classification after Stage 15

Rank	Rider	Team	Time
1	Miguel Induráin (ESP)	Banesto	74h 07' 55"
2	Piotr Ugrumov (LAT)	Mecair–Ballan	+ 49"
3	Claudio Chiappucci (ITA)	Carrera Jeans–Tassoni	+ 1' 18"
4	Massimiliano Lelli (ITA)	Ariostea	+ 1' 49"
5	Vladimir Poulnikov (UKR)	Carrera Jeans–Tassoni	+ 2' 41"
6	Pavel Tonkov (RUS)	Lampre–Polti	+ 3' 19"
7	Maurizio Fondriest (ITA)	Lampre–Polti	+ 3' 26"
8	Stephen Roche (IRL)	Carrera Jeans–Tassoni	+ 6' 50"
9	Moreno Argentin (ITA)	Mecair–Ballan	+ 7' 22"
10	Flavio Giupponi (ITA)	Mercatone Uno–Zucchini–Medeghini	+ 7' 39"

== Stage 16 ==
8 June 1993 — Lumezzane to Borgo Val di Taro, 181 km (112 mi)

Stage 16 result

Rank	Rider	Team	Time
1	Fabio Baldato (ITA)	GB–MG Maglificio	4h 27' 40"
2	Maurizio Fondriest (ITA)	Lampre–Polti	s.t.
3	Fabiano Fontanelli (ITA)	Navigare–Blue Storm	s.t.
4	Andreas Kappes (GER)	Mecair–Ballan	s.t.
5	Endrio Leoni (ITA)	Jolly Componibili–Club 88	s.t.
6	Dimitri Konyshev (RUS)	Jolly Componibili–Club 88	s.t.
7	Stefano Zanatta (ITA)	Gatorade–Mega Drive–Kenwood	s.t.
8	Emmanuel Magnien (FRA)	Castorama	s.t.
9	Andrey Teteryuk (KAZ)	Mapei–Viner	s.t.
10	Bruno Cenghialta (ITA)	Ariostea	s.t.

General classification after Stage 16

Rank	Rider	Team	Time
1	Miguel Induráin (ESP)	Banesto	78h 35' 35"
2	Piotr Ugrumov (LAT)	Mecair–Ballan	+ 49"
3	Claudio Chiappucci (ITA)	Carrera Jeans–Tassoni	+ 1' 18"
4	Massimiliano Lelli (ITA)	Ariostea	+ 1' 49"
5	Vladimir Poulnikov (UKR)	Carrera Jeans–Tassoni	+ 2' 43"
6	Maurizio Fondriest (ITA)	Lampre–Polti	+ 3' 18"
7	Pavel Tonkov (RUS)	Lampre–Polti	+ 3' 19"
8	Stephen Roche (IRL)	Carrera Jeans–Tassoni	+ 6' 50"
9	Moreno Argentin (ITA)	Mecair–Ballan	+ 7' 22"
10	Flavio Giupponi (ITA)	Mercatone Uno–Zucchini–Medeghini	+ 7' 39"

== Stage 17 ==
9 June 1993 — Varazze to Pontechianale, 223 km (139 mi)

Stage 17 result

Rank	Rider	Team	Time
1	Marco Saligari (ITA)	Ariostea	6h 07' 00"
2	Gianluca Bortolami (ITA)	Lampre–Polti	+ 1' 12"
3	Mauro Santaromita (ITA)	Ariostea	+ 1' 14"
4	Adriano Baffi (ITA)	Mercatone Uno–Zucchini–Medeghini	+ 3' 40"
5	Laurent Desbiens (FRA)	Castorama	+ 5' 06"
6	Maurizio Fondriest (ITA)	Lampre–Polti	+ 9' 16"
7	Piotr Ugrumov (LAT)	Mecair–Ballan	s.t.
8	Massimiliano Lelli (ITA)	Ariostea	s.t.
9	Claudio Chiappucci (ITA)	Carrera Jeans–Tassoni	s.t.
10	Miguel Induráin (ESP)	Banesto	s.t.

General classification after Stage 17

Rank	Rider	Team	Time
1	Miguel Induráin (ESP)	Banesto	84h 51' 51"
2	Piotr Ugrumov (LAT)	Mecair–Ballan	+ 49"
3	Claudio Chiappucci (ITA)	Carrera Jeans–Tassoni	+ 1' 18"
4	Massimiliano Lelli (ITA)	Ariostea	+ 1' 49"
5	Vladimir Poulnikov (UKR)	Carrera Jeans–Tassoni	+ 2' 43"
6	Maurizio Fondriest (ITA)	Lampre–Polti	+ 3' 18"
7	Pavel Tonkov (RUS)	Lampre–Polti	+ 3' 19"
8	Stephen Roche (IRL)	Carrera Jeans–Tassoni	+ 6' 50"
9	Moreno Argentin (ITA)	Mecair–Ballan	+ 7' 22"
10	Flavio Giupponi (ITA)	Mercatone Uno–Zucchini–Medeghini	+ 7' 39"

== Stage 18 ==
10 June 1993 — Sampeyre to Fossano, 150 km (93 mi)

Stage 18 result

Rank	Rider	Team	Time
1	Adriano Baffi (ITA)	Mercatone Uno–Zucchini–Medeghini	3h 22' 00"
2	Ján Svorada (SVK)	Lampre–Polti	s.t.
3	Fabio Baldato (ITA)	GB–MG Maglificio	s.t.
4	Fabiano Fontanelli (ITA)	Navigare–Blue Storm	s.t.
5	Fabio Casartelli (ITA)	Ariostea	s.t.
6	Mario Manzoni (ITA)	Gatorade–Mega Drive–Kenwood	s.t.
7	Maurizio Fondriest (ITA)	Lampre–Polti	s.t.
8	Endrio Leoni (ITA)	Jolly Componibili–Club 88	s.t.
9	Falk Boden (GER)	Festina–Lotus	s.t.
10	Steve Bauer (CAN)	Motorola	s.t.

General classification after Stage 18

Rank	Rider	Team	Time
1	Miguel Induráin (ESP)	Banesto	88h 13' 51"
2	Piotr Ugrumov (LAT)	Mecair–Ballan	+ 49"
3	Claudio Chiappucci (ITA)	Carrera Jeans–Tassoni	+ 1' 18"
4	Massimiliano Lelli (ITA)	Ariostea	+ 1' 49"
5	Vladimir Poulnikov (UKR)	Carrera Jeans–Tassoni	+ 2' 43"
6	Maurizio Fondriest (ITA)	Lampre–Polti	+ 3' 18"
7	Pavel Tonkov (RUS)	Lampre–Polti	+ 3' 19"
8	Stephen Roche (IRL)	Carrera Jeans–Tassoni	+ 6' 50"
9	Moreno Argentin (ITA)	Mecair–Ballan	+ 7' 22"
10	Flavio Giupponi (ITA)	Mercatone Uno–Zucchini–Medeghini	+ 7' 39"

== Stage 19 ==
11 June 1993 — Pinerolo to Sestriere, 55 km (34 mi) (ITT)

Stage 19 result

Rank	Rider	Team	Time
1	Miguel Induráin (ESP)	Banesto	1h 36' 29"
2	Piotr Ugrumov (LAT)	Mecair–Ballan	+ 45"
3	Moreno Argentin (ITA)	Mecair–Ballan	+ 2' 17"
4	Zenon Jaskuła (POL)	GB–MG Maglificio	+ 2' 48"
5	Flavio Vanzella (ITA)	GB–MG Maglificio	+ 3' 37"
6	Marco Finco (ITA)	Festina–Lotus	+ 3' 43"
7	Massimiliano Lelli (ITA)	Ariostea	+ 3' 52"
8	Pavel Tonkov (RUS)	Lampre–Polti	+ 3' 55"
9	Claudio Chiappucci (ITA)	Carrera Jeans–Tassoni	+ 4' 15"
10	Rolf Aldag (GER)	Team Telekom	+ 4' 24"

General classification after Stage 19

Rank	Rider	Team	Time
1	Miguel Induráin (ESP)	Banesto	89h 50' 20"
2	Piotr Ugrumov (LAT)	Mecair–Ballan	+ 1' 34"
3	Claudio Chiappucci (ITA)	Carrera Jeans–Tassoni	+ 5' 33"
4	Massimiliano Lelli (ITA)	Ariostea	+ 5' 41"
5	Pavel Tonkov (RUS)	Lampre–Polti	+ 7' 14"
6	Vladimir Poulnikov (UKR)	Carrera Jeans–Tassoni	+ 9' 38"
7	Moreno Argentin (ITA)	Mecair–Ballan	+ 9' 39"
8	Maurizio Fondriest (ITA)	Lampre–Polti	+ 10' 43"
9	Zenon Jaskuła (POL)	GB–MG Maglificio	+ 12' 54"
10	Stephen Roche (IRL)	Carrera Jeans–Tassoni	+ 14' 03"

== Stage 20 ==
12 June 1993 — Turin to Santuario di Oropa, 162 km (101 mi)

Stage 20 result

Rank	Rider	Team	Time
1	Massimo Ghirotto (ITA)	ZG Mobili	4h 18' 19"
2	Marco Giovannetti (ITA)	Mapei–Viner	+ 21"
3	Laurent Madouas (FRA)	Castorama	+ 47"
4	Abelardo Rondón (COL)	Gatorade–Mega Drive–Kenwood	+ 57"
5	Piotr Ugrumov (LAT)	Mecair–Ballan	+ 1' 52"
6	Stephen Roche (IRL)	Carrera Jeans–Tassoni	+ 1' 56"
7	Moreno Argentin (ITA)	Mecair–Ballan	+ 2' 01"
8	Claudio Chiappucci (ITA)	Carrera Jeans–Tassoni	+ 2' 22"
9	Pavel Tonkov (RUS)	Lampre–Polti	+ 2' 25"
10	Miguel Induráin (ESP)	Banesto	+ 2' 28"

General classification after Stage 20

Rank	Rider	Team	Time
1	Miguel Induráin (ESP)	Banesto	94h 11' 07"
2	Piotr Ugrumov (LAT)	Mecair–Ballan	+ 58"
3	Claudio Chiappucci (ITA)	Carrera Jeans–Tassoni	+ 5' 27"
4	Massimiliano Lelli (ITA)	Ariostea	+ 6' 09"
5	Pavel Tonkov (RUS)	Lampre–Polti	+ 7' 11"
6	Moreno Argentin (ITA)	Mecair–Ballan	+ 9' 12"
7	Vladimir Poulnikov (UKR)	Carrera Jeans–Tassoni	+ 11' 36"
8	Maurizio Fondriest (ITA)	Lampre–Polti	+ 12' 53"
9	Stephen Roche (IRL)	Carrera Jeans–Tassoni	+ 13' 31"
10	Zenon Jaskuła (POL)	GB–MG Maglificio	+ 13' 41"

== Stage 21 ==
13 June 1993 — Biella to Milan, 166 km (103 mi)

Stage 21 result

Rank	Rider	Team	Time
1	Fabio Baldato (ITA)	GB–MG Maglificio	3h 58' 37"
2	Endrio Leoni (ITA)	Jolly Componibili–Club 88	s.t.
3	Mario Manzoni (ITA)	Gatorade–Mega Drive–Kenwood	s.t.
4	Adriano Baffi (ITA)	Mercatone Uno–Zucchini–Medeghini	s.t.
5	Stefano Allocchio (ITA)	Lampre–Polti	s.t.
6	Emmanuel Magnien (FRA)	Castorama	s.t.
7	Steve Bauer (CAN)	Motorola	s.t.
8	Andreas Kappes (GER)	Mecair–Ballan	s.t.
9	Dimitri Konyshev (RUS)	Jolly Componibili–Club 88	s.t.
10	Ján Svorada (SVK)	Lampre–Polti	s.t.

General classification after Stage 21

Rank	Rider	Team	Time
1	Miguel Induráin (ESP)	Banesto	98h 09' 44"
2	Piotr Ugrumov (LAT)	Mecair–Ballan	+ 58"
3	Claudio Chiappucci (ITA)	Carrera Jeans–Tassoni	+ 5' 27"
4	Massimiliano Lelli (ITA)	Ariostea	+ 6' 09"
5	Pavel Tonkov (RUS)	Lampre–Polti	+ 7' 11"
6	Moreno Argentin (ITA)	Mecair–Ballan	+ 9' 12"
7	Vladimir Poulnikov (UKR)	Carrera Jeans–Tassoni	+ 11' 30"
8	Maurizio Fondriest (ITA)	Lampre–Polti	+ 12' 53"
9	Stephen Roche (IRL)	Carrera Jeans–Tassoni	+ 13' 31"
10	Zenon Jaskuła (POL)	GB–MG Maglificio	+ 13' 41"
