= 1990 Giro d'Italia, Stage 11 to Stage 20 =

Cycling race stages

The 1990 Giro d'Italia was the 73rd edition of the Giro d'Italia, one of cycling's Grand Tours. The Giro began in Bari, with an individual time trial on 18 May, and Stage 11 occurred on 28 May with a stage from Cuneo. The race finished in Milan on 6 June.

== Stage 11 ==
28 May 1990 — Cuneo to Lodi, 241 km (150 mi)

Stage 11 result

Rank	Rider	Team	Time
1	Adriano Baffi (ITA)	Ariostea	6h 19' 07"
2	Phil Anderson (AUS)	TVM	s.t.
3	Jean-Paul van Poppel (NED)	Panasonic–Sportlife	s.t.
4	Marcel Wüst (FRG)	RMO	s.t.
5	Djamolidine Abdoujaparov (URS)	Alfa Lum	s.t.
6	Paolo Rosola (ITA)	Gis Gelati–Benotto	s.t.
7	Roberto Pagnin (ITA)	Malvor–Sidi	s.t.
8	Giuseppe Citterio (ITA)	Malvor–Sidi	s.t.
9	Guido Bontempi (ITA)	Carrera Jeans–Vagabond	s.t.
10	Philippe Casado (FRA)	Z–Tomasso	s.t.

General classification after Stage 11

Rank	Rider	Team	Time
1	Gianni Bugno (ITA)	Chateau d'Ax–Salotti	50h 27' 14"
2	Marco Giovannetti (ITA)	Seur	+ 4' 08"
3	Charly Mottet (FRA)	RMO	+ 4' 09"
4	Federico Echave (ESP)	CLAS–Cajastur	+ 4' 41"
5	Joaquim Halupczok (POL)	Diana–Colnago–Animex	+ 5' 06"
6	Vladimir Poulnikov (URS)	Alfa Lum	+ 5' 14"
7	Claudio Chiappucci (ITA)	Carrera Jeans–Vagabond	+ 5' 55"
8	Marino Lejarreta (ESP)	ONCE	+ 6' 02"
9	Piotr Ugrumov (URS)	Alfa Lum	+ 6' 43"
10	Flavio Giupponi (ITA)	Carrera Jeans–Vagabond	+ 6' 47"

== Stage 12 ==
29 May 1990 — Brescia to Baselga di Pinè, 193 km (120 mi)

Stage 12 result

Rank	Rider	Team	Time
1	Éric Boyer (FRA)	Z–Tomasso	4h 55' 16"
2	Gianni Bugno (ITA)	Chateau d'Ax–Salotti	+ 33"
3	Joaquim Halupczok (POL)	Diana–Colnago–Animex	s.t.
4	Charly Mottet (FRA)	RMO	s.t.
5	Piotr Ugrumov (URS)	Alfa Lum	s.t.
6	Marco Giovannetti (ITA)	Seur	s.t.
7	Franco Chioccioli (ITA)	Del Tongo	s.t.
8	Federico Echave (ESP)	CLAS–Cajastur	s.t.
9	Marino Lejarreta (ESP)	ONCE	s.t.
10	Fabrice Philipot (FRA)	Castorama	s.t.

General classification after Stage 12

Rank	Rider	Team	Time
1	Gianni Bugno (ITA)	Chateau d'Ax–Salotti	55h 22' 55"
2	Marco Giovannetti (ITA)	Seur	+ 4' 16"
3	Charly Mottet (FRA)	RMO	+ 4' 17"
4	Federico Echave (ESP)	CLAS–Cajastur	+ 4' 49"
5	Joaquim Halupczok (POL)	Diana–Colnago–Animex	+ 5' 10"
6	Vladimir Poulnikov (URS)	Alfa Lum	+ 5' 22"
7	Marino Lejarreta (ESP)	ONCE	+ 6' 10"
8	Piotr Ugrumov (URS)	Alfa Lum	+ 6' 51"
9	Flavio Giupponi (ITA)	Carrera Jeans–Vagabond	+ 6' 55"
10	Eduardo Chozas (ESP)	ONCE	+ 7' 11"

== Stage 13 ==
30 May 1990 — Baselga di Pinè to Udine, 224 km (139 mi)

Stage 13 result

Rank	Rider	Team	Time
1	Mario Cipollini (ITA)	Del Tongo	5h 43' 35"
2	Djamolidine Abdoujaparov (URS)	Alfa Lum	s.t.
3	Alessio Di Basco (ITA)	Gis Gelati–Benotto	s.t.
4	Paolo Rosola (ITA)	Gis Gelati–Benotto	s.t.
5	Giovanni Fidanza (ITA)	Chateau d'Ax–Salotti	s.t.
6	Guido Bontempi (ITA)	Carrera Jeans–Vagabond	s.t.
7	Marcel Wüst (FRG)	RMO	s.t.
8	Phil Anderson (AUS)	TVM	s.t.
9	Jean-Paul van Poppel (NED)	Panasonic–Sportlife	s.t.
10	Adriano Baffi (ITA)	Ariostea	s.t.

General classification after Stage 13

Rank	Rider	Team	Time
1	Gianni Bugno (ITA)	Chateau d'Ax–Salotti	60h 06' 30"
2	Marco Giovannetti (ITA)	Seur	+ 4' 16"
3	Charly Mottet (FRA)	RMO	+ 4' 17"
4	Federico Echave (ESP)	CLAS–Cajastur	+ 4' 49"
5	Joaquim Halupczok (POL)	Diana–Colnago–Animex	+ 5' 10"
6	Vladimir Poulnikov (URS)	Alfa Lum	+ 5' 22"
7	Marino Lejarreta (ESP)	ONCE	+ 6' 10"
8	Piotr Ugrumov (URS)	Alfa Lum	+ 6' 51"
9	Flavio Giupponi (ITA)	Carrera Jeans–Vagabond	+ 6' 55"
10	Eduardo Chozas (ESP)	ONCE	+ 7' 11"

== Stage 14 ==
31 May 1990 — Klagenfurt to Klagenfurt, 164 km (102 mi)

Stage 14 result

Rank	Rider	Team	Time
1	Allan Peiper (AUS)	Panasonic–Sportlife	4h 02' 26"
2	Pascal Poisson (FRA)	Z–Tomasso	s.t.
3	Massimo Ghirotto (ITA)	Carrera Jeans–Vagabond	+ 13"
4	Henri Abadie (FRA)	Z–Tomasso	s.t.
5	Roberto Pagnin (ITA)	Malvor–Sidi	s.t.
6	Dimitri Konyshev (URS)	Alfa Lum	s.t.
7	Massimiliano Lelli (ITA)	Ariostea	s.t.
8	Alberto Volpi (ITA)	Chateau d'Ax–Salotti	s.t.
9	Rolf Järmann (SUI)	Frank–Monte Tamaro	s.t.
10	François Lemarchand (FRA)	Z–Tomasso	s.t.

General classification after Stage 14

Rank	Rider	Team	Time
1	Gianni Bugno (ITA)	Chateau d'Ax–Salotti	65h 09' 17"
2	Marco Giovannetti (ITA)	Seur	+ 4' 16"
3	Charly Mottet (FRA)	RMO	+ 4' 17"
4	Federico Echave (ESP)	CLAS–Cajastur	+ 4' 49"
5	Joaquim Halupczok (POL)	Diana–Colnago–Animex	+ 5' 10"
6	Vladimir Poulnikov (URS)	Alfa Lum	+ 5' 22"
7	Marino Lejarreta (ESP)	ONCE	+ 6' 10"
8	Piotr Ugrumov (URS)	Alfa Lum	+ 6' 51"
9	Flavio Giupponi (ITA)	Carrera Jeans–Vagabond	+ 6' 55"
10	Eduardo Chozas (ESP)	ONCE	+ 7' 11"

== Stage 15 ==
1 June 1990 — Velden am Wörther See to Dobbiaco, 226 km (140 mi)

Stage 15 result

Rank	Rider	Team	Time
1	Éric Boyer (FRA)	Z–Tomasso	6h 16' 14"
2	Jon Unzaga (ESP)	Seur	s.t.
3	Piotr Ugrumov (URS)	Alfa Lum	s.t.
4	Leonardo Sierra (VEN)	Selle Italia–Eurocar	s.t.
5	Massimo Ghirotto (ITA)	Carrera Jeans–Vagabond	s.t.
6	Eduardo Chozas (ESP)	ONCE	s.t.
7	Franco Chioccioli (ITA)	Del Tongo	+ 19"
8	Henri Abadie (FRA)	Z–Tomasso	+ 56"
9	Acácio da Silva (POR)	Carrera Jeans–Vagabond	s.t.
10	Angelo Lecchi (ITA)	Del Tongo	s.t.

General classification after Stage 15

Rank	Rider	Team	Time
1	Gianni Bugno (ITA)	Chateau d'Ax–Salotti	71h 25' 31"
2	Marco Giovannetti (ITA)	Seur	+ 4' 16"
3	Charly Mottet (FRA)	RMO	+ 4' 17"
4	Federico Echave (ESP)	CLAS–Cajastur	+ 4' 49"
5	Joaquim Halupczok (POL)	Diana–Colnago–Animex	+ 5' 10"
6	Vladimir Poulnikov (URS)	Alfa Lum	+ 5' 22"
7	Piotr Ugrumov (URS)	Alfa Lum	+ 5' 52"
8	Marino Lejarreta (ESP)	ONCE	+ 6' 10"
9	Eduardo Chozas (ESP)	ONCE	+ 6' 16"
10	Flavio Giupponi (ITA)	Carrera Jeans–Vagabond	+ 6' 55"

== Stage 16 ==
2 June 1990 — Dobbiaco to Passo Pordoi, 171 km (106 mi)

Stage 16 result

Rank	Rider	Team	Time
1	Charly Mottet (FRA)	RMO	5h 29' 24"
2	Gianni Bugno (ITA)	Chateau d'Ax–Salotti	s.t.
3	Franco Chioccioli (ITA)	Del Tongo	+ 2' 16"
4	Marco Giovannetti (ITA)	Seur	s.t.
5	Maurizio Vandelli (ITA)	Gis Gelati–Benotto	+ 3' 38"
6	Dimitri Konyshev (URS)	Alfa Lum	+ 4' 06"
7	Federico Echave (ESP)	CLAS–Cajastur	+ 4' 40"
8	Franco Vona (ITA)	Chateau d'Ax–Salotti	+ 4' 47"
9	Leonardo Sierra (VEN)	Selle Italia–Eurocar	+ 4' 59"
10	Vladimir Poulnikov (URS)	Alfa Lum	+ 5' 00"

General classification after Stage 16

Rank	Rider	Team	Time
1	Gianni Bugno (ITA)	Chateau d'Ax–Salotti	76h 55' 42"
2	Charly Mottet (FRA)	RMO	+ 4' 13"
3	Marco Giovannetti (ITA)	Seur	+ 6' 40"
4	Federico Echave (ESP)	CLAS–Cajastur	+ 9' 37"
5	Franco Chioccioli (ITA)	Del Tongo	+ 10' 06"
6	Vladimir Poulnikov (URS)	Alfa Lum	+ 10' 30"
7	Eduardo Chozas (ESP)	ONCE	+ 13' 07"
8	Marino Lejarreta (ESP)	ONCE	+ 13' 11"
9	Piotr Ugrumov (URS)	Alfa Lum	+ 13' 12"
10	Massimiliano Lelli (ITA)	Ariostea	+ 15' 08"

== Stage 17 ==
3 June 1990 — Moena to Aprica, 223 km (139 mi)

Stage 17 result

Rank	Rider	Team	Time
1	Leonardo Sierra (VEN)	Selle Italia–Eurocar	7h 16' 58"
2	Alberto Volpi (ITA)	Chateau d'Ax–Salotti	+ 52"
3	Éric Boyer (FRA)	Z–Tomasso	+ 1' 26"
4	Gianni Bugno (ITA)	Chateau d'Ax–Salotti	+ 2' 10"
5	Franco Chioccioli (ITA)	Del Tongo	s.t.
6	Charly Mottet (FRA)	RMO	s.t.
7	Piotr Ugrumov (URS)	Alfa Lum	s.t.
8	Dimitri Konyshev (URS)	Alfa Lum	s.t.
9	Massimiliano Lelli (ITA)	Ariostea	s.t.
10	Federico Echave (ESP)	CLAS–Cajastur	s.t.

General classification after Stage 17

Rank	Rider	Team	Time
1	Gianni Bugno (ITA)	Chateau d'Ax–Salotti	84h 14' 50"
2	Charly Mottet (FRA)	RMO	+ 4' 13"
3	Marco Giovannetti (ITA)	Seur	+ 6' 40"
4	Federico Echave (ESP)	CLAS–Cajastur	+ 9' 37"
5	Franco Chioccioli (ITA)	Del Tongo	+ 10' 06"
6	Vladimir Poulnikov (URS)	Alfa Lum	+ 10' 30"
7	Marino Lejarreta (ESP)	ONCE	+ 13' 11"
8	Piotr Ugrumov (URS)	Alfa Lum	+ 13' 12"
9	Eduardo Chozas (ESP)	ONCE	s.t.
10	Massimiliano Lelli (ITA)	Ariostea	+ 15' 08"

== Stage 18 ==
4 June 1990 — Aprica to Gallarate, 180 km (110 mi)

Stage 18 result

Rank	Rider	Team	Time
1	Adriano Baffi (ITA)	Ariostea	4h 45' 48"
2	Mario Cipollini (ITA)	Del Tongo	s.t.
3	Djamolidine Abdoujaparov (URS)	Alfa Lum	s.t.
4	Phil Anderson (AUS)	TVM	s.t.
5	Giovanni Strazzer (ITA)	Malvor–Sidi	s.t.
6	Paolo Rosola (ITA)	Gis Gelati–Benotto	s.t.
7	Guido Bontempi (ITA)	Carrera Jeans–Vagabond	s.t.
8	Giovanni Fidanza (ITA)	Chateau d'Ax–Salotti	s.t.
9	Jean-Paul van Poppel (NED)	Panasonic–Sportlife	s.t.
10	Stefano Allocchio (ITA)	Italbonifica–Navigare	s.t.

General classification after Stage 18

Rank	Rider	Team	Time
1	Gianni Bugno (ITA)	Chateau d'Ax–Salotti	89h 00' 38"
2	Charly Mottet (FRA)	RMO	+ 4' 13"
3	Marco Giovannetti (ITA)	Seur	+ 6' 40"
4	Federico Echave (ESP)	CLAS–Cajastur	+ 9' 37"
5	Franco Chioccioli (ITA)	Del Tongo	+ 10' 06"
6	Vladimir Poulnikov (URS)	Alfa Lum	+ 10' 30"
7	Marino Lejarreta (ESP)	ONCE	+ 13' 11"
8	Piotr Ugrumov (URS)	Alfa Lum	+ 13' 12"
9	Eduardo Chozas (ESP)	ONCE	s.t.
10	Massimiliano Lelli (ITA)	Ariostea	+ 15' 08"

== Stage 19 ==
5 June 1990 — Gallarate to Sacro Monte di Varese, 39 km (24 mi) (ITT)

Stage 19 result

Rank	Rider	Team	Time
1	Gianni Bugno (ITA)	Chateau d'Ax–Salotti	58' 04"
2	Marino Lejarreta (ESP)	ONCE	+ 1' 20"
3	Luca Gelfi (ITA)	Del Tongo	+ 1' 22"
4	Claudio Chiappucci (ITA)	Carrera Jeans–Vagabond	+ 1' 35"
5	Vladimir Poulnikov (URS)	Alfa Lum	+ 1' 55"
6	Massimiliano Lelli (ITA)	Ariostea	+ 2' 06"
7	Gianluca Pierobon (ITA)	Malvor–Sidi	+ 2' 11"
8	Pascal Poisson (FRA)	Z–Tomasso	s.t.
9	Charly Mottet (FRA)	RMO	+ 2' 20"
10	Marco Giovannetti (ITA)	Seur	+ 2' 21"

General classification after Stage 19

Rank	Rider	Team	Time
1	Gianni Bugno (ITA)	Chateau d'Ax–Salotti	89h 58' 42"
2	Charly Mottet (FRA)	RMO	+ 6' 33"
3	Marco Giovannetti (ITA)	Seur	+ 9' 01"
4	Vladimir Poulnikov (URS)	Alfa Lum	+ 12' 24"
5	Federico Echave (ESP)	CLAS–Cajastur	+ 12' 29"
6	Franco Chioccioli (ITA)	Del Tongo	s.t.
7	Marino Lejarreta (ESP)	ONCE	+ 14' 31"
8	Piotr Ugrumov (URS)	Alfa Lum	+ 17' 02"
9	Massimiliano Lelli (ITA)	Ariostea	+ 17' 14"
10	Leonardo Sierra (VEN)	Selle Italia–Eurocar	+ 19' 12"

== Stage 20 ==
6 June 1990 — Milan to Milan, 90 km (56 mi)

Stage 20 result

Rank	Rider	Team	Time
1	Mario Cipollini (ITA)	Del Tongo	1h 52' 26"
2	Adriano Baffi (ITA)	Ariostea	s.t.
3	Giovanni Strazzer (ITA)	Malvor–Sidi	s.t.
4	Giovanni Fidanza (ITA)	Chateau d'Ax–Salotti	s.t.
5	Roberto Pagnin (ITA)	Malvor–Sidi	s.t.
6	Rolf Sørensen (DEN)	Ariostea	s.t.
7	Silvio Martinello (ITA)	Jolly Componibili–Club 88	s.t.
8	Paolo Cimini (ITA)	Gis Gelati–Benotto	s.t.
9	Casimiro Moreda (ESP)	CLAS–Cajastur	s.t.
10	Francesco Rossignoli (ITA)	Jolly Componibili–Club 88	s.t.

General classification after Stage 20

Rank	Rider	Team	Time
1	Gianni Bugno (ITA)	Chateau d'Ax–Salotti	91h 51' 38"
2	Charly Mottet (FRA)	RMO	+ 6' 33"
3	Marco Giovannetti (ITA)	Seur	+ 9' 01"
4	Vladimir Poulnikov (URS)	Alfa Lum	+ 12' 25"
5	Federico Echave (ESP)	CLAS–Cajastur	+ 12' 29"
6	Franco Chioccioli (ITA)	Del Tongo	s.t.
7	Marino Lejarreta (ESP)	ONCE	+ 14' 31"
8	Piotr Ugrumov (URS)	Alfa Lum	+ 17' 02"
9	Massimiliano Lelli (ITA)	Ariostea	+ 17' 14"
10	Leonardo Sierra (VEN)	Selle Italia–Eurocar	+ 19' 12"
