= Christian Henn =

German cyclist (born 1964)

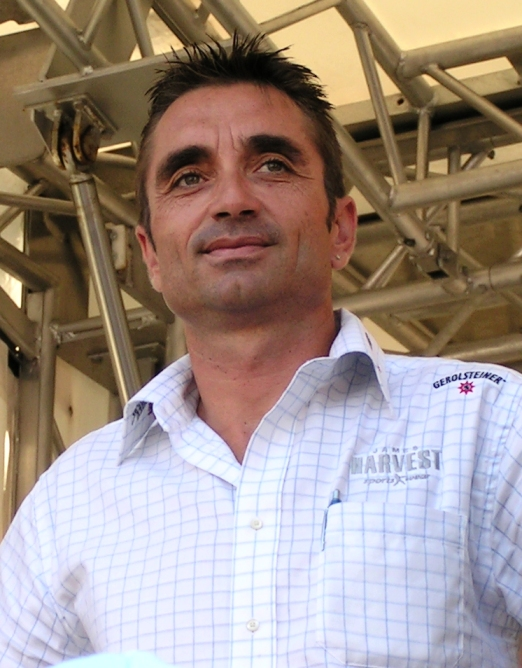
- Henn at the 2006 Deutschland Tour

Personal information
- Full name: Christian Henn
- Born: 1 February 1964 (age 62) Heidelberg, West Germany
- Height: 1.82 m (5 ft 11 1/2 in)
- Weight: 71 kg (157 lb; 11 st 3 lb)

Cycling career
- Sport: Cycling
- Current team: Team Lotto–Kern Haus Outlet Montabaur
- Discipline: Road
- Role: Rider (retired); Directeur sportif

Professional teams
- 1989–1991: Carrera Jeans–Vagabond
- 1992–1999: Team Telekom

Managerial teams
- 2000: IPM–Profirad–Schwerin
- 2001–2008: Gerolsteiner
- 2009–2010: Team Milram
- 2012: Itera–Katusha
- 2012: Team Katusha
- 2014: MLP Team Bergstraße
- 2017–: Team Lotto–Kern Haus
Medal record
Men's cycling
Representing West Germany
Olympic Games
Bronze medal – third place	1988 Seoul	Individual Road Race

Christian Henn (born 11 March 1964) is a German former road racing cyclist, who won the bronze medal for West Germany in the men's individual road race at the 1988 Summer Olympics in Seoul, South Korea. He also won the German National Road Race Championships in 1996. He was a professional rider from 1989 to 1999. After he retired after testing positive for testosterone, he admitted to doping.

He now works as a directeur sportif for UCI Continental team Team Lotto–Kern Haus Outlet Montabaur.

== Major results ==
1988
3rd Road race, Olympic Games
1989
8th Grand Prix Cerami
10th Grand Prix de la Libération
1992
2nd Paris–Tours
10th GP de Fourmies
1993
2nd Rund um Köln
4th Druivenkoers Overijse
9th Grote Prijs Jef Scherens
1994
1st Overall Herald Sun Tour

1st Stage 7

5th Grand Prix de Wallonie
1995
1st Stage 13 Vuelta a España
3rd GP Ouest-France
3rd Circuito de Getxo
5th Druivenkoers Overijse
5th Clásica de Sabiñánigo
1996
1st Road race, National Road Championships
1st Stage 2 Tour of Sweden
9th Overall Danmark Rundt
9th Overall Regio-Tour
1997
1st Overall Bayern Rundfahrt

1st Stage 3a

1st Overall Hessen Rundfahrt
1st Stage 3a Danmark Rundt
1st Flèche Ardennaise
2nd Overall Peace Race

1st Stage 6

2nd Tour de Berne
4th Giro del Piemonte
1998
1st Baden-Baden
4th Veenendaal–Veenendaal
1999
9th Overall Tour de Luxembourg

== See also ==
- List of doping cases in cycling
