= 1995 GP Ouest-France =

Race details
- Dates: 27 August 1995
- Stages: 1
- Distance: 209 km (129.9 mi)
- Winning time: 4h 53' 29"

Results
| | Winner | Rolf Järmann (SUI) | (MG Maglificio–Technogym) |
| | Second | Laurent Madouas (FRA) | (Castorama) |
| | Third | Christian Henn (GER) | (Team Telekom) |

The 1995 GP Ouest-France was the 59th edition of the GP Ouest-France cycle race and was held on 27 August 1995. The race started and finished in Plouay. The race was won by Rolf Järmann of the MG Maglificio team.

== General classification ==
Final general classification

| Rank | Rider | Team | Time |
|---|---|---|---|
| 1 | Rolf Järmann (SUI) | MG Maglificio–Technogym | 4h 53' 29" |
| 2 | Laurent Madouas (FRA) | Castorama | + 3" |
| 3 | Christian Henn (GER) | Team Telekom | + 31" |
| 4 | Dimitri Konyshev (RUS) | Aki–Gipiemme | + 1' 55" |
| 5 | Emmanuel Hubert (FRA) | Le Groupement | + 1' 55" |
| 6 | Laurent Desbiens (FRA) | Castorama | + 1' 55" |
| 7 | Claude Lamour (FRA) | Mutuelle de Seine-et-Marne | + 1' 55" |
| 8 | Didier Rous (FRA) | GAN | + 1' 55" |
| 9 | Claudio Chiappucci (ITA) | Carrera Jeans–Tassoni | + 3' 32" |
| 10 | Arvis Piziks (LAT) | Novell–Decca–Colnago | + 3' 32" |
