= 2000 Giro d'Italia, Stage 11 to Stage 21 =

Cycling race stages

The 2000 Giro d'Italia was the 83rd edition of the Giro d'Italia, one of cycling's Grand Tours. The Giro began in Rome, with a Prologue individual time trial on 13 May, and Stage 11 occurred on 24 May with an individual time trial from Lignano Sabbiadoro. The race finished in Milan on 4 June.

== Stage 11 ==
24 May 2000 — Lignano Sabbiadoro to Bibione, 45 km (28 mi) (ITT)

Stage 11 result

Rank	Rider	Team	Time
1	Víctor Hugo Peña (COL)	Vitalicio Seguros	49' 25"
2	Jan Hruška (CZE)	Vitalicio Seguros	+ 11"
3	Serhiy Honchar (UKR)	Liquigas–Pata	+ 1' 06"
4	Álvaro González de Galdeano (ESP)	Vitalicio Seguros	+ 1' 32"
5	Andrea Peron (ITA)	Fassa Bortolo	s.t.
6	Pavel Tonkov (RUS)	Mapei–Quick-Step	+ 1' 52"
7	Wladimir Belli (ITA)	Fassa Bortolo	+ 1' 56"
8	Riccardo Forconi (ITA)	Mercatone Uno–Albacom	+ 2' 02"
9	Stefano Garzelli (ITA)	Mercatone Uno–Albacom	+ 2' 15"
10	Erik Dekker (NED)	Rabobank	+ 2' 16"

General classification after Stage 11

Rank	Rider	Team	Time
1	Francesco Casagrande (ITA)	Vini Caldirola–Sidermec	54h 46' 35"
2	Wladimir Belli (ITA)	Fassa Bortolo	+ 4"
3	Pavel Tonkov (RUS)	Mapei–Quick-Step	+ 7"
4	Danilo Di Luca (ITA)	Cantina Tollo–Regain	+ 10"
5	Jan Hruška (CZE)	Vitalicio Seguros	+ 17"
6	Stefano Garzelli (ITA)	Mercatone Uno–Albacom	+ 22"
7	Dario Frigo (ITA)	Fassa Bortolo	+ 44"
8	Andrea Noè (ITA)	Mapei–Quick-Step	+ 49"
9	Ivan Gotti (ITA)	Team Polti	+ 1' 19"
10	Serhiy Honchar (UKR)	Liquigas–Pata	+ 1' 22"

== Rest day ==
25 May 2000

== Stage 12 ==
26 May 2000 — Bibione to Feltre, 184 km (114 mi)

Stage 12 result

Rank	Rider	Team	Time
1	Enrico Cassani (ITA)	Team Polti	4h 05' 18"
2	Davide Bramati (ITA)	Mapei–Quick-Step	+ 1"
3	Dimitri Konyshev (RUS)	Fassa Bortolo	s.t.
4	Mirco Gualdi (ITA)	Mobilvetta Design–Rossin	s.t.
5	Addy Engels (NED)	Rabobank	s.t.
6	Francesco Casagrande (ITA)	Vini Caldirola–Sidermec	s.t.
7	Ruber Marín (COL)	Aguardiente Néctar–Selle Italia	s.t.
8	Mariano Piccoli (ITA)	Lampre–Daikin	s.t.
9	Orlando Rodrigues (POR)	Banesto	s.t.
10	Sergio Barbero (ITA)	Lampre–Daikin	s.t.

General classification after Stage 12

Rank	Rider	Team	Time
1	Francesco Casagrande (ITA)	Vini Caldirola–Sidermec	58h 56' 36"
2	Wladimir Belli (ITA)	Fassa Bortolo	+ 4"
3	Pavel Tonkov (RUS)	Mapei–Quick-Step	+ 7"
4	Danilo Di Luca (ITA)	Cantina Tollo–Regain	+ 10"
5	Jan Hruška (CZE)	Vitalicio Seguros	+ 17"
6	Stefano Garzelli (ITA)	Mercatone Uno–Albacom	+ 22"
7	Dario Frigo (ITA)	Fassa Bortolo	+ 44"
8	Andrea Noè (ITA)	Mapei–Quick-Step	+ 49"
9	Ivan Gotti (ITA)	Team Polti	+ 1' 19"
10	Serhiy Honchar (UKR)	Liquigas–Pata	+ 1' 22"

== Stage 13 ==
27 May 2000 — Feltre to Sëlva, 195 km (121 mi)

Stage 13 result

Rank	Rider	Team	Time
1	José Luis Rubiera (ESP)	Kelme–Costa Blanca	5h 16' 45"
2	Gilberto Simoni (ITA)	Lampre–Daikin	s.t.
3	Stefano Garzelli (ITA)	Mercatone Uno–Albacom	+ 31"
4	Francesco Casagrande (ITA)	Vini Caldirola–Sidermec	s.t.
5	Hernán Buenahora (COL)	Aguardiente Néctar–Selle Italia	+ 35"
6	Paolo Savoldelli (ITA)	Saeco–Valli & Valli	s.t.
7	Santiago Blanco (ESP)	Vitalicio Seguros	s.t.
8	Serhiy Honchar (UKR)	Liquigas–Pata	+ 1' 28"
9	Dario Frigo (ITA)	Fassa Bortolo	s.t.
10	Pavel Tonkov (RUS)	Mapei–Quick-Step	s.t.

General classification after Stage 13

Rank	Rider	Team	Time
1	Francesco Casagrande (ITA)	Vini Caldirola–Sidermec	64h 13' 52"
2	Stefano Garzelli (ITA)	Mercatone Uno–Albacom	+ 18"
3	Wladimir Belli (ITA)	Fassa Bortolo	+ 1' 01"
4	Pavel Tonkov (RUS)	Mapei–Quick-Step	s.t.
5	Gilberto Simoni (ITA)	Lampre–Daikin	+ 1' 05"
6	Dario Frigo (ITA)	Fassa Bortolo	+ 1' 41"
7	José Luis Rubiera (ESP)	Kelme–Costa Blanca	+ 1' 50"
8	Andrea Noè (ITA)	Mapei–Quick-Step	+ 1' 52"
9	Ivan Gotti (ITA)	Team Polti	+ 2' 16"
10	Serhiy Honchar (UKR)	Liquigas–Pata	+ 2' 19"

== Stage 14 ==
28 May 2000 — Sëlva to Bormio, 205 km (127 mi)

Stage 14 result

Rank	Rider	Team	Time
1	Gilberto Simoni (ITA)	Lampre–Daikin	5h 38' 09"
2	Eddy Mazzoleni (ITA)	Team Polti	s.t.
3	Filippo Casagrande (ITA)	Vini Caldirola–Sidermec	s.t.
4	Wladimir Belli (ITA)	Fassa Bortolo	s.t.
5	Dario Frigo (ITA)	Fassa Bortolo	+ 7"
6	Ivan Gotti (ITA)	Team Polti	s.t.
7	Stefano Garzelli (ITA)	Mercatone Uno–Albacom	+ 11"
8	Víctor Hugo Peña (COL)	Vitalicio Seguros	s.t.
9	Danilo Di Luca (ITA)	Cantina Tollo–Regain	+ 22"
10	Leonardo Piepoli (ITA)	Banesto	+ 25"

General classification after Stage 14

Rank	Rider	Team	Time
1	Francesco Casagrande (ITA)	Vini Caldirola–Sidermec	69h 51' 57"
2	Stefano Garzelli (ITA)	Mercatone Uno–Albacom	+ 33"
3	Gilberto Simoni (ITA)	Lampre–Daikin	+ 57"
4	Wladimir Belli (ITA)	Fassa Bortolo	+ 1' 05"
5	Dario Frigo (ITA)	Fassa Bortolo	+ 1' 52"
6	Ivan Gotti (ITA)	Team Polti	+ 2' 27"
7	Pavel Tonkov (RUS)	Mapei–Quick-Step	+ 2' 35"
8	Andrea Noè (ITA)	Mapei–Quick-Step	+ 3' 23"
9	Hernán Buenahora (COL)	Aguardiente Néctar–Selle Italia	+ 3' 31"
10	Serhiy Honchar (UKR)	Liquigas–Pata	+ 3' 50"

== Stage 15 ==
29 May 2000 — Bormio to Brescia, 171 km (106 mi)

Stage 15 result

Rank	Rider	Team	Time
1	Biagio Conte (ITA)	Saeco–Valli & Valli	4h 45' 44"
2	Alessandro Petacchi (ITA)	Fassa Bortolo	s.t.
3	Silvio Martinello (ITA)	Team Polti	s.t.
4	Alberto Ongarato (ITA)	Mobilvetta Design–Rossin	s.t.
5	Jeroen Blijlevens (NED)	Team Polti	s.t.
6	Mauro Gerosa (ITA)	Amica Chips–Tacconi Sport	s.t.
7	Fabrizio Guidi (ITA)	Française des Jeux	s.t.
8	Matteo Tosatto (ITA)	Fassa Bortolo	s.t.
9	Ján Svorada (CZE)	Lampre–Daikin	s.t.
10	Davide Bramati (ITA)	Mapei–Quick-Step	s.t.

General classification after Stage 15

Rank	Rider	Team	Time
1	Francesco Casagrande (ITA)	Vini Caldirola–Sidermec	74h 37' 41"
2	Stefano Garzelli (ITA)	Mercatone Uno–Albacom	+ 33"
3	Gilberto Simoni (ITA)	Lampre–Daikin	+ 57"
4	Wladimir Belli (ITA)	Fassa Bortolo	+ 1' 05"
5	Dario Frigo (ITA)	Fassa Bortolo	+ 1' 52"
6	Ivan Gotti (ITA)	Team Polti	+ 2' 27"
7	Pavel Tonkov (RUS)	Mapei–Quick-Step	+ 2' 35"
8	Andrea Noè (ITA)	Mapei–Quick-Step	+ 3' 23"
9	Hernán Buenahora (COL)	Aguardiente Néctar–Selle Italia	+ 3' 31"
10	Serhiy Honchar (UKR)	Liquigas–Pata	+ 3' 50"

== Stage 16 ==
30 May 2000 — Brescia to Meda, 102 km (63 mi)

Stage 16 result

Rank	Rider	Team	Time
1	Fabrizio Guidi (ITA)	Française des Jeux	2h 27' 34"
2	Steven de Jongh (NED)	Rabobank	s.t.
3	Biagio Conte (ITA)	Saeco–Valli & Valli	s.t.
4	Marco Zanotti (ITA)	Liquigas–Pata	s.t.
5	Moreno Di Biase (ITA)	Cantina Tollo–Regain	s.t.
6	Ciarán Power (IRE)	Linda McCartney Racing Team	s.t.
7	Tayeb Braikia (DEN)	Linda McCartney Racing Team	s.t.
8	Guido Trenti (USA)	Cantina Tollo–Regain	s.t.
9	Gianpaolo Mondini (ITA)	Cantina Tollo–Regain	s.t.
10	Ján Svorada (CZE)	Lampre–Daikin	s.t.

General classification after Stage 16

Rank	Rider	Team	Time
1	Francesco Casagrande (ITA)	Vini Caldirola–Sidermec	77h 05' 15"
2	Stefano Garzelli (ITA)	Mercatone Uno–Albacom	+ 33"
3	Gilberto Simoni (ITA)	Lampre–Daikin	+ 57"
4	Wladimir Belli (ITA)	Fassa Bortolo	+ 1' 05"
5	Dario Frigo (ITA)	Fassa Bortolo	+ 1' 52"
6	Ivan Gotti (ITA)	Team Polti	+ 2' 27"
7	Pavel Tonkov (RUS)	Mapei–Quick-Step	+ 2' 35"
8	Andrea Noè (ITA)	Mapei–Quick-Step	+ 3' 23"
9	Hernán Buenahora (COL)	Aguardiente Néctar–Selle Italia	+ 3' 31"
10	Serhiy Honchar (UKR)	Liquigas–Pata	+ 3' 50"

== Stage 17 ==
31 May 2000 — Meda to Genoa, 224 km (139 mi)

Stage 17 result

Rank	Rider	Team	Time
1	Álvaro González de Galdeano (ESP)	Vitalicio Seguros	5h 23' 02"
2	Ján Svorada (CZE)	Lampre–Daikin	+ 24"
3	Dimitri Konyshev (RUS)	Fassa Bortolo	s.t.
4	Alessandro Petacchi (ITA)	Fassa Bortolo	s.t.
5	Silvio Martinello (ITA)	Team Polti	s.t.
6	Dario Pieri (ITA)	Saeco–Valli & Valli	s.t.
7	Steven de Jongh (NED)	Rabobank	s.t.
8	Tayeb Braikia (DEN)	Linda McCartney Racing Team	s.t.
9	Fabrizio Guidi (ITA)	Française des Jeux	s.t.
10	Moreno Di Biase (ITA)	Cantina Tollo–Regain	s.t.

General classification after Stage 17

Rank	Rider	Team	Time
1	Francesco Casagrande (ITA)	Vini Caldirola–Sidermec	82h 28' 41"
2	Stefano Garzelli (ITA)	Mercatone Uno–Albacom	+ 33"
3	Gilberto Simoni (ITA)	Lampre–Daikin	+ 57"
4	Wladimir Belli (ITA)	Fassa Bortolo	+ 1' 05"
5	Dario Frigo (ITA)	Fassa Bortolo	+ 1' 52"
6	Ivan Gotti (ITA)	Team Polti	+ 2' 27"
7	Pavel Tonkov (RUS)	Mapei–Quick-Step	+ 2' 35"
8	Andrea Noè (ITA)	Mapei–Quick-Step	+ 3' 23"
9	Hernán Buenahora (COL)	Aguardiente Néctar–Selle Italia	+ 3' 31"
10	Serhiy Honchar (UKR)	Liquigas–Pata	+ 3' 50"

== Stage 18 ==
1 June 2000 — Genoa to Prato Nevoso, 176 km (109 mi)

Stage 18 result

Rank	Rider	Team	Time
1	Stefano Garzelli (ITA)	Mercatone Uno–Albacom	4h 42' 32"
2	Gilberto Simoni (ITA)	Lampre–Daikin	s.t.
3	Filippo Casagrande (ITA)	Vini Caldirola–Sidermec	s.t.
4	Leonardo Piepoli (ITA)	Banesto	+ 2"
5	Pavel Tonkov (RUS)	Mapei–Quick-Step	s.t.
6	Wladimir Belli (ITA)	Fassa Bortolo	s.t.
7	Hernán Buenahora (COL)	Aguardiente Néctar–Selle Italia	+ 8"
8	Andrea Noè (ITA)	Mapei–Quick-Step	+ 12"
9	Santiago Blanco (ESP)	Vitalicio Seguros	s.t.
10	José Luis Rubiera (ESP)	Kelme–Costa Blanca	+ 49"

General classification after Stage 18

Rank	Rider	Team	Time
1	Francesco Casagrande (ITA)	Vini Caldirola–Sidermec	87h 11' 09"
2	Stefano Garzelli (ITA)	Mercatone Uno–Albacom	+ 25"
3	Gilberto Simoni (ITA)	Lampre–Daikin	+ 53"
4	Wladimir Belli (ITA)	Fassa Bortolo	+ 1' 11"
5	Pavel Tonkov (RUS)	Mapei–Quick-Step	+ 2' 41"
6	Andrea Noè (ITA)	Mapei–Quick-Step	+ 3' 39"
7	Hernán Buenahora (COL)	Aguardiente Néctar–Selle Italia	+ 3' 43"
8	Ivan Gotti (ITA)	Team Polti	+ 4' 25"
9	Dario Frigo (ITA)	Fassa Bortolo	+ 4' 34"
10	Santiago Blanco (ESP)	Vitalicio Seguros	+ 4' 39"

== Stage 19 ==
2 June 2000 — Saluzzo to Briançon, 177 km (110 mi)

Stage 19 result

Rank	Rider	Team	Time
1	Paolo Lanfranchi (ITA)	Mapei–Quick-Step	5h 32' 07"
2	Marco Pantani (ITA)	Mercatone Uno–Albacom	+ 54"
3	Gilberto Simoni (ITA)	Lampre–Daikin	+ 1' 01"
4	Francesco Casagrande (ITA)	Vini Caldirola–Sidermec	s.t.
5	Stefano Garzelli (ITA)	Mercatone Uno–Albacom	s.t.
6	Pavel Tonkov (RUS)	Mapei–Quick-Step	+ 1' 06"
7	Hernán Buenahora (COL)	Aguardiente Néctar–Selle Italia	+ 1' 08"
8	Leonardo Piepoli (ITA)	Banesto	+ 2' 00"
9	Andrea Noè (ITA)	Mapei–Quick-Step	+ 2' 48"
10	José Luis Rubiera (ESP)	Kelme–Costa Blanca	+ 2' 51"

General classification after Stage 19

Rank	Rider	Team	Time
1	Francesco Casagrande (ITA)	Vini Caldirola–Sidermec	92h 44' 17"
2	Stefano Garzelli (ITA)	Mercatone Uno–Albacom	+ 25"
3	Gilberto Simoni (ITA)	Lampre–Daikin	+ 49"
4	Pavel Tonkov (RUS)	Mapei–Quick-Step	+ 2' 46"
5	Hernán Buenahora (COL)	Aguardiente Néctar–Selle Italia	+ 3' 50"
6	Wladimir Belli (ITA)	Fassa Bortolo	+ 5' 17"
7	Andrea Noè (ITA)	Mapei–Quick-Step	+ 5' 26"
8	José Luis Rubiera (ESP)	Kelme–Costa Blanca	+ 6' 35"
9	Leonardo Piepoli (ITA)	Banesto	+ 7' 12"
10	Santiago Blanco (ESP)	Vitalicio Seguros	+ 8' 01"

== Stage 20 ==
3 June 2000 — Briançon to Sestriere, 34 km (21 mi) (ITT)

Stage 20 result

Rank	Rider	Team	Time
1	Jan Hruška (CZE)	Vitalicio Seguros	59' 49"
2	Andrea Noè (ITA)	Mapei–Quick-Step	+ 1' 14"
3	Stefano Garzelli (ITA)	Mercatone Uno–Albacom	+ 1' 17"
4	Serhiy Honchar (UKR)	Liquigas–Pata	+ 1' 41"
5	Dario Frigo (ITA)	Fassa Bortolo	+ 1' 47"
6	Gilberto Simoni (ITA)	Lampre–Daikin	+ 2' 26"
7	Riccardo Forconi (ITA)	Mercatone Uno–Albacom	+ 2' 29"
8	Leonardo Piepoli (ITA)	Banesto	+ 3' 02"
9	Francesco Casagrande (ITA)	Vini Caldirola–Sidermec	+ 3' 09"
10	Marzio Bruseghin (ITA)	Banesto	+ 3' 13"

General classification after Stage 20

Rank	Rider	Team	Time
1	Stefano Garzelli (ITA)	Mercatone Uno–Albacom	93h 45' 48"
2	Francesco Casagrande (ITA)	Vini Caldirola–Sidermec	+ 1' 27"
3	Gilberto Simoni (ITA)	Lampre–Daikin	+ 1' 33"
4	Andrea Noè (ITA)	Mapei–Quick-Step	+ 4' 58"
5	Pavel Tonkov (RUS)	Mapei–Quick-Step	+ 5' 28"
6	Hernán Buenahora (COL)	Aguardiente Néctar–Selle Italia	+ 5' 48"
7	Wladimir Belli (ITA)	Fassa Bortolo	+ 7' 38"
8	José Luis Rubiera (ESP)	Kelme–Costa Blanca	+ 8' 08"
9	Serhiy Honchar (UKR)	Liquigas–Pata	+ 8' 14"
10	Leonardo Piepoli (ITA)	Banesto	+ 8' 32"

== Stage 21 ==
4 June 2000 — Turin to Milan, 198 km (123 mi)

Stage 21 result

Rank	Rider	Team	Time
1	Mariano Piccoli (ITA)	Lampre–Daikin	4h 44' 12"
2	Giuseppe Calcaterra (ITA)	Saeco–Valli & Valli	s.t.
3	Mirco Gualdi (ITA)	Mobilvetta Design–Rossin	s.t.
4	Oscar Pozzi (ITA)	Amica Chips–Tacconi Sport	s.t.
5	Daniele Contrini (ITA)	Liquigas–Pata	s.t.
6	Gianluca Bortolami (ITA)	Vini Caldirola–Sidermec	+ 14"
7	Dimitri Konyshev (RUS)	Fassa Bortolo	s.t.
8	Miguel Ángel Martín Perdiguero (ESP)	Vitalicio Seguros	s.t.
9	Andrea Peron (ITA)	Fassa Bortolo	s.t.
10	Ján Svorada (CZE)	Lampre–Daikin	s.t.

General classification after Stage 21

Rank	Rider	Team	Time
1	Stefano Garzelli (ITA)	Mercatone Uno–Albacom	98h 30' 14"
2	Francesco Casagrande (ITA)	Vini Caldirola–Sidermec	+ 1' 27"
3	Gilberto Simoni (ITA)	Lampre–Daikin	+ 1' 33"
4	Andrea Noè (ITA)	Mapei–Quick-Step	+ 4' 58"
5	Pavel Tonkov (RUS)	Mapei–Quick-Step	+ 5' 28"
6	Hernán Buenahora (COL)	Aguardiente Néctar–Selle Italia	+ 5' 48"
7	Wladimir Belli (ITA)	Fassa Bortolo	+ 7' 38"
8	José Luis Rubiera (ESP)	Kelme–Costa Blanca	+ 8' 08"
9	Serhiy Honchar (UKR)	Liquigas–Pata	+ 8' 14"
10	Leonardo Piepoli (ITA)	Banesto	+ 8' 32"
