= Dozza Castle =

Castle in Emilia-Romagna, Italy

Coordinates: 44°21′31.9″N 11°37′40.4″E

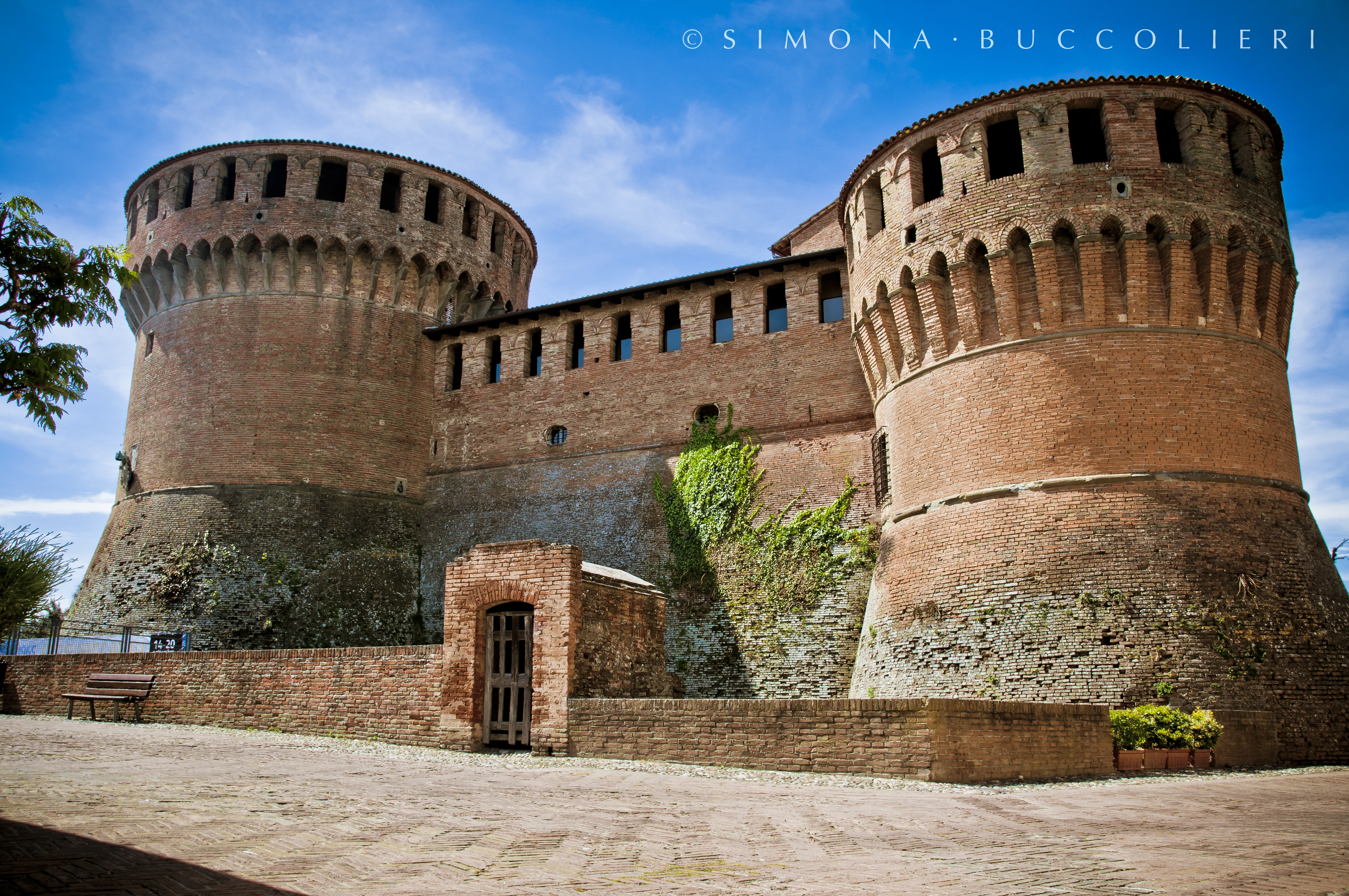
Rocca di Dozza

The Rocca Malvezzi-Campeggi, also known as the Rocca Sforzesca di Dozza, or simply the Rocca di Dozza, is a medieval castle in the town of Dozza, in the Emilia-Romagna region of Italy.

== History ==
The general layout of the present structure was likely built in the mid-13th century as a purely military stronghold, atop more ancient foundations. It was rebuilt and expanded several times over the centuries, first as a fortified castle and later as a noble residence.

The main outline visible today dates from the end of the 15th century, when Caterina Sforza, Lady of Imola and Forlì and wife of Girolamo Riario, commissioned a refurbishment from the architect Giorgio Marchesi. Riario was a grandson of Pope Sixtus IV. Marchesi, assisted by military engineers in the service of the Sforza family, helped design the defensive towers, moat, and merlons.

The Campeggi family settled in the fortress in 1565; the renovation works that converted it from a military stronghold into a noble residence, begun by Annibale, Baldassarre, and Vincenzo Campeggi, were completed in 1594 by Antonio Campeggi on behalf of the Malvezzi family of Bologna. In the 1500s, the castle had also been granted by Pope Clement VII to Cardinal Lorenzo Campeggi, who converted it into a residence, roofing the courtyard and creating open loggias.

Upon the death of Lorenzo Campeggi in 1728, the last male heir of the Campeggi line, the castle passed to Francesca Maria Campeggi, who was married to Matteo Malvezzi; their son carried on the name Malvezzi-Campeggi. In 1798, the Napoleonic occupation of the region abolished feudal domains, but the castle remained in the hands of the family until 1960. The Campeggi and Malvezzi families resided in the castle continuously from the 16th century until then.

In 1960, the castle was acquired by the Comune of Dozza. The main hall still holds portraits of the Malvezzi family and tapestries bearing the family coat of arms, alongside a portrait of the Campeggi family by Lorenzo Pasinelli.

== Architecture ==
The castle has a hexagonal plan with a perimeter of about 200 metres, characterised by two circular corner towers set into a polygonal central body. Near the access bridge stands a large circular tower, known as the Torresino, which some scholars identify as the original keep guarding the most important part of the building; it measures 16 metres in diameter, with walls between 3 and 6 metres thick. The smaller Torrione dei Bolognesi has a diameter of 11 metres and walls between 2 and 4 metres thick. The perimeter walls of the other two façades are heavily battered, reaching the ground directly, and include two rhomboid bastions. Also notable are the Rivellino (ravelin) and the Rocchetta, both dating to the 14th century.

== Museum ==
Since 1960 the castle has been owned by the Comune of Dozza, which converted it into a museum. Ten rooms on the piano nobile can be visited, retaining their original appearance, along with the armoury, the dungeons (housing instruments of torture), and a distinctive "razor well" (pozzo a rasoio). The kitchens are also well preserved, complete with period utensils, fireplaces, and a well.

On the second floor, a small art gallery holds a collection of works donated by Norma Mascellani, a Bolognese painter granted honorary citizenship of Dozza. The third floor houses the Centro Studi e Documentazione del Muro Dipinto, which preserves more than 150 sketches, studies, and archival documents related to the town's biennial Muro Dipinto ("Painted Wall") contemporary art festival.

The museum is managed by the Fondazione Dozza Città d'Arte and has been recognised as a "Museo di Qualità" by the Emilia-Romagna region since 2006. It is part of the region's Sistema Museale Regionale, the Fondo Ambiente Italiano, and the Associazione Nazionale Case della Memoria.

== Regional Enoteca ==
Ten years after the Comune's acquisition of the castle, an internal space was converted into a wine bar showcasing the best production of both Emilia and Romagna. In 1978, a regional law recognised the Dozza enoteca as the primary vehicle for promoting the region's wine in Italy and abroad. It was officially inaugurated on 26 May 1990 as the Enoteca Regionale Emilia-Romagna. Occupying around 1,000 square metres across the basement and part of the ground floor of the castle, it displays roughly 10,000 bottles representing some 450 labels.
