= 1992 Paris–Tours =

Race details
- Dates: 10 October 1992
- Stages: 1
- Distance: 286 km (177.7 mi)
- Winning time: 6h 07' 44"

Results
	Winner	Hendrik Redant (BEL)	(Lotto–Mavic–MBK)
	Second	Christian Henn (GER)	(Team Telekom)
	Third	Olaf Ludwig (GER)	(Panasonic–Sportlife)

The 1992 Paris–Tours was the 86th edition of the Paris–Tours cycle race and was held on 10 October 1992. The race started in Issy-les-Moulineaux and finished in Tours. The race was won by Hendrik Redant of the Lotto team.

== General classification ==
Final general classification

Rank	Rider	Team	Time
1	Hendrik Redant (BEL)	Lotto–Mavic–MBK	6h 07' 44"
2	Christian Henn (GER)	Team Telekom	+ 1"
3	Olaf Ludwig (GER)	Panasonic–Sportlife	+ 10"
4	Andrei Tchmil (MDA)	GB–MG Maglificio	+ 10"
5	Laurent Jalabert (FRA)	ONCE	+ 10"
6	Phil Anderson (AUS)	Motorola	+ 33"
7	Laurent Brochard (FRA)	Castorama	+ 34"
8	Frans Maassen (NED)	Buckler–Colnago–Decca	+ 34"
9	Maurizio Fondriest (ITA)	Panasonic–Sportlife	+ 34"
10	Edwig Van Hooydonck (BEL)	Buckler–Colnago–Decca	+ 34"
