= Dozza =

- Comune
- Comune di Dozza
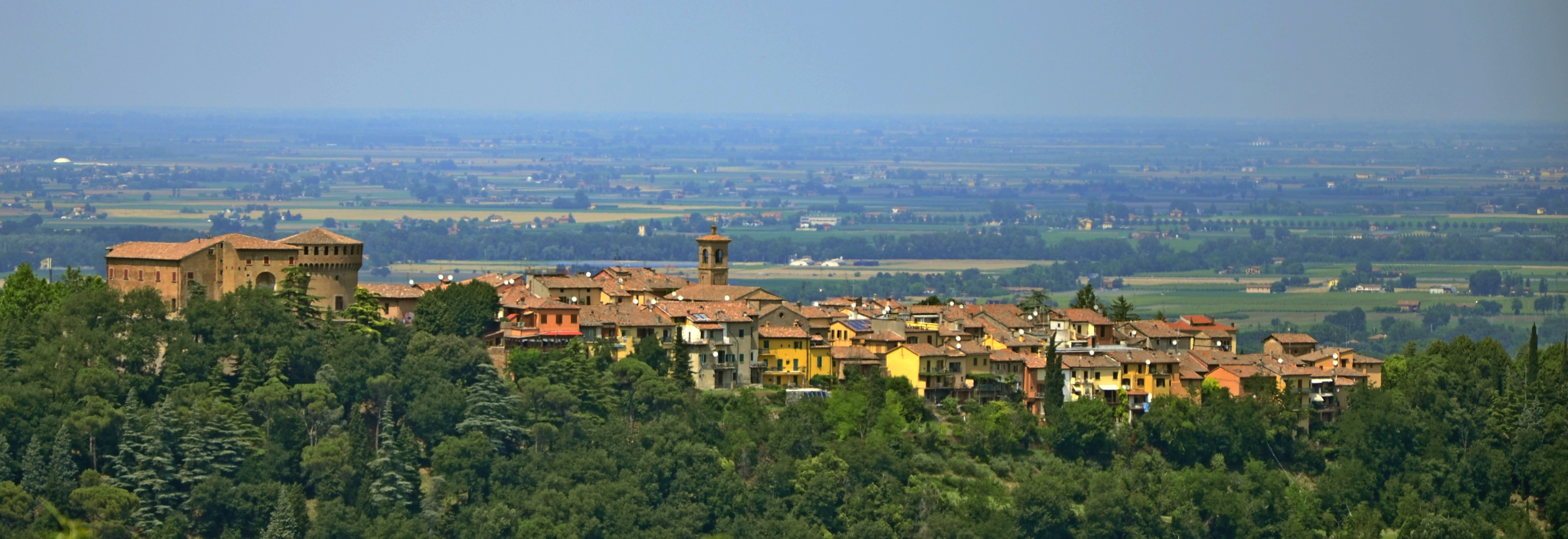

- Location within Italy Location within Emilia-Romagna
- Coordinates: 44°21′32″N 11°37′43″E
- Country: Italy
- Region: Emilia-Romagna
- Metropolitan city: Bologna (BO)

Government
  - Mayor: Luca Albertazzi

Area
  - Total: 24 km^{2} (9.3 sq mi)
- Elevation: 190 m (620 ft)

Population (December 31, 2004)
  - Total: 5,886
  - Density: 250/km^{2} (640/sq mi)
- Demonym: Dozzesi
- Time zone: UTC+1 (CET)
  - Summer (DST): UTC+2 (CEST)
- Postal code: 40060
- Dialing code: 0542
- Website: Official website

Dozza (Romagnol: Dòza) (Italian pronunciation: [ˈdɔttsa]) is an Italian comune in the Metropolitan City of Bologna. Dozza is known for its festival of the painted wall, which takes place every two years in September. During this festival, famous national and international artists paint permanent works on the walls of the houses. A local landmark is Dozza Castle, whose cellars host Enoteca Regionale Emilia Romagna, the enoteca and wine bar dedicated to oenological products of Emilia-Romagna. It is one of I Borghi più belli d'Italia ("The most beautiful villages of Italy").

== History ==
- Cardinal Campeggio was given the castle of Dozza while dealing with the 'King's Great Matter'.

== Culture ==
=== Museums ===
- Museo della Rocca di Dozza
- Museo parrocchiale di arte sacra
