= UCI Road World Cup =

Road cycling championship

- World Cup leader jersey
- Formerly: Super Prestige Pernod International
- Sport: Road bicycle racing
- First season: 1989
- Folded: 2004
- Replaced by: UCI ProTour
- Countries: International
- Last champions: Paolo Bettini (ITA) (Quick-Step–Davitamon); T-Mobile Team
- Most titles: Paolo Bettini (ITA) (3)
- Related competitions: UCI Road World Rankings; UCI Women's Road Cycling World Cup

The UCI Road World Cup was a season-long road cycling competition, organised annually by the Union Cycliste Internationale (UCI) from 1989 until 2004.

The World Cup was made up of ten one-day races chosen from the classics. Riders accumulated points based on finishing positions across various events, with scoring for individuals and teams. In the years of the competition, points were awarded to the top 25 finishers in each round, ranging from 100 points for the winner to 1 point for 25th place. The rider leading the overall standings wore a distinctive jersey for subsequent events.

Following the 2004 season, the competition was discontinued. It was replaced by the UCI ProTour and the UCI Continental Circuits, which began in 2005.

== History ==
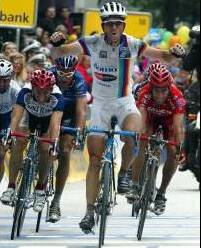
Johan Museeuw winning 2002 HEW Cyclassics wearing the World Cup leader jersey

The UCI Road World Cup was introduced in 1989 which replaced the former season-long cup, the Super Prestige Pernod International. The competition initially featured a set of one-day races that collectively formed an annual calendar of races. In the first three years, the competition was sponsored by Perrier. Both an individual overall winner and a team winner were determined each season.

In 1989, the classics making up the World Cup were the: Milan–San Remo, Tour of Flanders, Paris–Roubaix, Liège–Bastogne–Liège, Amstel Gold Race, Wincanton Classic (Newcastle), Grand Prix of the Americas (Montreal), Clásica de San Sebastián, Züri-Metzgete, Grand Prix de la Liberation (though the team time trial was held in Eindhoven), Paris-Tours, and the Giro di Lombardia.

In 1990, an individual time trial was added in Lunel. In 1991, the final time trial was held in Bergamo, which counted as both the Grand Prix des Nations and the Trofeo Baracchi.

The final time trial (1990–1993) was an invitation event. Those invited were: the single Cup race winners, the first 10 of the general classification before the last race, the first 10 in the World Ranking, and the reigning World Champion. If any declined their invitation, the highest ranked in the World Cup yet to be invited were invited in their place.

In 1992, the Grand Prix de la Liberation was removed from the series. In the sea year, the Grand Prix of the Americas was renamed to the Grand Prix Téléglobe, before being removed as a World Cup event the following year. That same year the final time trial was replaced by the Grand Prix des Nations, which took place in Palma de Mallorca. In 1993, the Grand Prix des Nations was held at Lac de Madine, before being removed from the competition the following year. In 1994, the Wincanton Classic became the Leeds International Classic.

In 1995, the Frankfurt Grand Prix was included as an event for that year only. Likewise, the Japan Cup was introduced only in the 1996 season.

In 1997, the Leeds International Classic was renamed the Rochester Classic. The following year it was replaced by the HEW Cyclassics in Hamburg.

From 1998 onward, the World Cup calendar stabilised around 10 events:

- Milan-San Remo
- Tour of Flanders
- Paris-Roubaix
- Amstel Gold Race
- Liège-Bastogne-Liège
- Hamburg Hew Cyclassics
- Clásica de San Sebastián
- Züri-Metzgete
- Paris-Tours
- Giro di Lombardia

The competition was held alongside the UCI Road World Rankings, which included all UCI sanctioned events. Both were replaced in the 2005 season by the newly created UCI ProTour and UCI Continental Circuits.

=== Notable overall winners ===
The record for most overall wins is held by Paolo Bettini for his three consecutive wins in 2002, 2003, and 2004. Maurizio Fondriest (1991 and 1993), Johan Museeuw (1995 and 1996) and Michele Bartoli (1997 and 1998) won the competition twice. Mapei had the most team wins (5).

== Points distribution ==
=== Individual ===
Points are awarded for the best riders in each race according to the following scale:

		1	2	3	4	5	6	7	8	9	10	11	12	13	14	15	16	17	18	19	20	21	22	23	24	25
Points	Editions 1989	12	9	8	7	6	5	4	3	2	1															
Points	Editions 1990–1991	25	22	20	18	16	15	14	13	12	11	10	9	8	7	6	5	4	3	2	1					
Points	Editions 1992–1996	50	35	25	20	18	16	14	12	10	8	6	5													
Points	Editions 1997–2004	100	70	50	40	36	32	28	24	20	16	15	14	13	12	11	10	9	8	7	6	5	4	3	2	1

From 1997-2004, a rider had to participate in at least six races to be considered in the final scoring.

=== Teams ===
For team scoring, the places of the first three riders of each team were added together. The team with the lowest total received 12 points, the second team received nine, the third team received eight, and so on until the tenth team scored a single point.

From 1997-2004, a team had to participate in at least eight races to be considered in the final scoring.

== Races ==
An X corresponds to a race that was held. Races with a grey background were not part of the World Cup that year.

Race/Season	1989	1990	1991	1992	1993	1994	1995	1996	1997	1998	1999	2000	2001	2002	2003	2004
(Italy) Milan–San Remo	X	X	X	X	X	X	X	X	X	X	X	X	X	X	X	X
(Belgium) Tour of Flanders	X	X	X	X	X	X	X	X	X	X	X	X	X	X	X	X
(France) Paris–Roubaix	X	X	X	X	X	X	X	X	X	X	X	X	X	X	X	X
(Belgium) Liège–Bastogne–Liège	X	X	X	X	X	X	X	X	X	X	X	X	X	X	X	X
(Netherlands) Amstel Gold Race	X	X	X	X	X	X	X	X	X	X	X	X	X	X	X	X
(Spain) Clásica de San Sebastián	X	X	X	X	X	X	X	X	X	X	X	X	X	X	X	X
(Switzerland) Züri-Metzgete/Grand Prix Suisse	X	X	X	X	X	X	X	X	X	X	X	X	X	X	X	X
(France) Paris–Tours	X	X	X	X	X	X	X	X	X	X	X	X	X	X	X	X
(Italy) Giro di Lombardia	X	X	X	X	X	X	X	X	X	X	X	X	X	X	X	X
(United Kingdom) Wincanton/Leeds/Rochester Classic	X	X	X	X	X	X	X	X	X							
(Canada) Grand Prix des Amériques	X	X	X	X												
(Netherlands) Grand Prix de la Libération	X	X	X													
(France) 1990 UCI Road World Cup Finale		X														
(France) Grand Prix des Nations	X	X	X	X	X	X		X	X	X	X	X	X	X	X	X
(Germany) Rund um den Henninger-Turm	X	X	X	X	X	X	X	X	X	X	X	X	X	X	X	X
Japan Cup				X	X	X	X	X	X	X	X	X	X	X	X	X
(Germany) HEW Cyclassics								X	X	X	X	X	X	X	X	X

== Jersey ==
After each race, the points each rider gained was added to their total. A special rainbow jersey was then presented to the leading rider in the overall ranking of the World Cup. He was obliged to wear this jersey in the following World Cup races as long as he held the lead in the overall standings. The jersey was issued for the first time in 1990. It retained the same core design with minor modifications of logos and colors. Only in the first World Cup was a grey-yellow jersey awarded to the leader instead of the later rainbow scheme.

== Winners ==
=== Individual ===
Year	Winner	Pts	Second	Pts	Third	Pts
1989	Sean Kelly (IRL)	44	Tony Rominger (SUI)	32	Rolf Sørensen (DEN)	27
1990	Gianni Bugno (ITA)	133	Rudy Dhaenens (BEL)	99	Sean Kelly (IRL)	94
1991	Maurizio Fondriest (ITA)	132	Laurent Jalabert (FRA)	121	Rolf Sørensen (DEN)	114
1992	Olaf Ludwig (GER)	144	Tony Rominger (SUI)	118	Davide Cassani (ITA)	108
1993	Maurizio Fondriest (ITA)	287	Johan Museeuw (BEL)	132	Max Sciandri (UK)	117
1994	Gianluca Bortolami (ITA)	151	Johan Museeuw (BEL)	125	Andrei Tchmil (MDA)	115
1995	Johan Museeuw (BEL)	199	Andrei Tchmil (UKR)	114	Mauro Gianetti (SUI)	106
1996	Johan Museeuw (BEL)	162	Andrea Ferrigato (ITA)	126	Michele Bartoli (ITA)	124
1997	Michele Bartoli (ITA)	280	Rolf Sørensen (DEN)	275	Andrea Tafi (ITA)	240
1998	Michele Bartoli (ITA)	416	Léon van Bon (NED)	190	Andrea Tafi (ITA)	166
1999	Andrei Tchmil (BEL)	299	Michael Boogerd (NED)	238	Frank Vandenbroucke (BEL)	214
2000	Erik Zabel (GER)	347	Andrei Tchmil (BEL)	285	Francesco Casagrande (ITA)	230
2001	Erik Dekker (NED)	331	Erik Zabel (GER)	250	Romāns Vainšteins (LAT)	229
2002	Paolo Bettini (ITA)	279	Johan Museeuw (BEL)	270	Michele Bartoli (ITA)	242
2003	Paolo Bettini (ITA)	365	Michael Boogerd (NED)	220	Peter Van Petegem (BEL)	220
2004	Paolo Bettini (ITA)	340	Davide Rebellin (ITA)	327	Óscar Freire (ESP)	252

=== Teams ===
Year	Winner	Second	Third
1989	(Netherlands) PDM–Ultima–Concorde	(Switzerland) Helvetia–La Suisse	(Belgium) Histor–Sigma
1990	(Netherlands) PDM–Concorde–Ultima	(Switzerland) Helvetia–La Suisse	(Netherlands) Panasonic–Sportlife
1991	(Netherlands) Panasonic–Sportlife	(Netherlands) Buckler–Colnago–Decca	(Netherlands) PDM–Concorde–Ultima
1992	(Netherlands) Panasonic–Sportlife	(Netherlands) Buckler–Colnago–Decca	(Italy) Ariostea
1993	(Italy) GB–MG Maglificio	(France) Novemail–Histor–Laser Computer	(Netherlands) TVM–Bison Kit
1994	(Italy) GB–MG Maglificio	(United States) Motorola	(Italy) Gewiss–Ballan
1995	(Italy) Mapei–GB–Latexco	(Italy) MG Maglificio–Technogym	(Italy) Gewiss–Ballan
1996	(Italy) Mapei–GB	(United States) Motorola	(Italy) MG Maglificio–Technogym
1997	(France) Française des Jeux	(Italy) Mapei–GB	(Netherlands) TVM–Farm Frites
1998	(Italy) Mapei–Bricobi	(Netherlands) Rabobank	(France) Casino–Ag2r
1999	(Netherlands) Rabobank	(Italy) Mapei–Quick-Step	(Belgium) Lotto–Mobistar
2000	(Italy) Mapei–Quick-Step	(Netherlands) Rabobank	(Italy) Fassa Bortolo
2001	(Netherlands) Rabobank	(Belgium) Domo–Farm Frites–Latexco	(Italy) Mapei–Quick-Step
2002	(Italy) Mapei–Quick-Step	(Italy) Fassa Bortolo	(Italy) Saeco–Longoni Sport
2003	(Italy) Saeco	(Belgium) Quick-Step–Davitamon	(Italy) Alessio
2004	(Germany) T-Mobile Team	(Netherlands) Rabobank	(Germany) Gerolsteiner

== See also ==
- UCI Women's Road World Cup
