= 1990 UCI Road World Cup =

2.ª edition of the cycling world cup

- Second edition of the UCI Road World Cup

Details
- Dates: March 17 – October 27
- Location: Canada and Europe
- Races: 13

Champions
- Individual champion: Gianni Bugno (ITA) (Chateau d'Ax–Salotti)
- Teams' champion: PDM–Concorde–Ultima

The 1990 UCI Road World Cup was the second edition of the UCI Road World Cup. From the 1989 edition, an individual time trial finale event in Lunel, France, was added. The series was won by Italian rider Gianni Bugno of Chateau d'Ax–Salotti. The leader jersey with the vertical rainbow was introduced in this edition.

== Races ==
Date	Race	Country	Winner	Team	World Cup Leader	Leader's Team	Report
March 17	Milan–San Remo	Italy	Gianni Bugno (ITA)	Chateau d'Ax–Salotti	Gianni Bugno (ITA)	Chateau d'Ax–Salotti	Report
April 1	Tour of Flanders	Belgium	Moreno Argentin (ITA)	Ariostea	Moreno Argentin (ITA)	Ariostea	Report
April 8	Paris–Roubaix	France	Eddy Planckaert (BEL)	Panasonic–Sportlife	Moreno Argentin (ITA)	Ariostea	Report
April 15	Liège–Bastogne–Liège	Belgium	Eric van Lancker (BEL)	Panasonic–Sportlife	Moreno Argentin (ITA)	Ariostea	Report
April 21	Amstel Gold Race	Netherlands	Adri van der Poel (NED)	Weinmann	Moreno Argentin (ITA)	Ariostea	Report
July 29	Wincanton Classic	United Kingdom	Gianni Bugno (ITA)	Chateau d'Ax–Salotti	Gianni Bugno (ITA)	Chateau d'Ax–Salotti	Report
August 11	Clásica de San Sebastián	Spain	Miguel Indurain (ESP)	Banesto	Gianni Bugno (ITA)	Chateau d'Ax–Salotti	Report
August 19	Züri-Metzgete	Switzerland	Charly Mottet (FRA)	RMO	Gianni Bugno (ITA)	Chateau d'Ax–Salotti	Report
August 30	Grand Prix des Amériques	Canada	Franco Ballerini (ITA)	Del Tongo	Gianni Bugno (ITA)	Chateau d'Ax–Salotti	Report
September 26	Grand Prix de la Libération	Netherlands	PDM–Concorde–Ultima		Gianni Bugno (ITA)	Chateau d'Ax–Salotti	Report
October 14	Paris–Tours	France	Rolf Sørensen (DEN)	Ariostea	Gianni Bugno (ITA)	Chateau d'Ax–Salotti	Report
October 20	Giro di Lombardia	Italy	Gilles Delion (FRA)	Helvetia–La Suisse	Gianni Bugno (ITA)	Chateau d'Ax–Salotti	Report
October 27	World Cup Finale	France	Erik Breukink (NED)	PDM–Concorde–Ultima	Gianni Bugno (ITA)	Chateau d'Ax–Salotti	Report

The final time trial was an invitation event. The invited riders are the single Cup race winners, the first 10 of the general classification before the last race, the first 10 in the World Ranking and the reigning World Champion. Some riders forfeit their right to start and some others in the high classification of World Cup are invited.

== Single races details ==
worldcupjersey	Denotes the Classification Leader

In the race results the leader jersey identify the rider who wore the jersey in the race (the leader at the start of the race).

In the general classification table the jersey identify the leader after the race.

17 March 1990 — Milan–San Remo 294 km (182.7 mi)

	Cyclist	Team	Time
1	Gianni Bugno (ITA)	Chateau d'Ax–Salotti	6h 25' 06"
2	Rolf Gölz (GER)	Buckler–Colnago–Decca	+ 4"
3	Gilles Delion (FRA)	Helvetia–La Suisse	+ 23"
4	Moreno Argentin (ITA)	Ariostea	+ 31"
5	Maurizio Fondriest (ITA)	Del Tongo	s.t.
6	Jean-Claude Colotti (FRA)	RMO	s.t.
7	Jesper Skibby (DEN)	TVM	s.t.
8	Adriano Baffi (ITA)	Ariostea	+ 1' 02"
9	Johan Museeuw (BEL)	Lotto–Superclub	s.t.
10	William Dazzani (ITA)	Italbonifica–Navigare	s.t.

General classification after Milan–San Remo

	Cyclist	Team	Points
1	Gianni Bugno (ITA)	Chateau d'Ax–Salotti	25
2	Rolf Gölz (GER)	Buckler–Colnago–Decca	22
3	Gilles Delion (FRA)	Helvetia–La Suisse	20
4	Moreno Argentin (ITA)	Ariostea	18
5	Maurizio Fondriest (ITA)	Del Tongo	16
6	Jean-Claude Colotti (FRA)	RMO	15
7	Jesper Skibby (DEN)	TVM	14
8	Adriano Baffi (ITA)	Ariostea	13
9	Johan Museeuw (BEL)	Lotto–Superclub	12
10	William Dazzani (ITA)	Italbonifica–Navigare	11

1 April 1990 — Tour of Flanders 262 km (162.8 mi)

	Cyclist	Team	Time
1	Moreno Argentin (ITA)	Ariostea	6h 47' 25"
2	Rudy Dhaenens (BEL)	PDM–Concorde–Ultima	s.t.
3	John Talen (NED)	Panasonic–Sportlife	+ 11"
4	Carlo Bomans (BEL)	Weinmann–SMM–Uster	s.t.
5	Maurizio Fondriest (ITA)	Del Tongo	+ 14"
6	Jan Schur (GDR)	Chateau d'Ax–Salotti	+ 23"
7	Niki Rüttimann (SUI)	Helvetia–La Suisse	s.t.
8	Claude Criquielion (BEL)	Lotto–Superclub	+ 37"
9	Jean-Claude Colotti (FRA)	RMO	s.t.
10	Franco Ballerini (ITA)	Del Tongo	s.t.

General classification after Tour of Flanders

	Cyclist	Team	Points
1	Moreno Argentin (ITA)	Ariostea	43
2	Gianni Bugno (ITA)	Chateau d'Ax–Salotti	34
3	Maurizio Fondriest (ITA)	Del Tongo	32
4	John Talen (NED)	Panasonic–Sportlife	28
5	Gilles Delion (FRA)	Helvetia–La Suisse	27
6	Jean-Claude Colotti (FRA)	RMO	27
7	Rudy Dhaenens (BEL)	PDM–Concorde–Ultima	22
8	Rolf Gölz (GER)	Buckler–Colnago–Decca	22
9	Carlo Bomans (BEL)	Weinmann–SMM–Uster	18
10	Jan Schur (GDR)	Chateau d'Ax–Salotti	15
10	Adriano Baffi (ITA)	Ariostea	15

8 April 1990 — Paris–Roubaix 265 km (164.7 mi)

	Cyclist	Team	Time
1	Eddy Planckaert (BEL)	Panasonic–Sportlife	7h 37' 02"
2	Steve Bauer (CAN)	7-Eleven	s.t.
3	Edwig Van Hooydonck (BEL)	Buckler–Colnago–Decca	s.t.
4	Martial Gayant (FRA)	Toshiba	s.t.
5	Jean-Marie Wampers (BEL)	Panasonic–Sportlife	+ 3"
6	Gilbert Duclos-Lassalle (FRA)	Z–Tomasso	s.t.
7	Thomas Wegmuller (SWI)	Weinmann–SMM–Uster	+ 7"
8	Adri van der Poel (NED)	Weinmann–SMM–Uster	+ 10"
9	Rudy Dhaenens (BEL)	PDM–Concorde–Ultima	s.t.
10	John Talen (NED)	Panasonic–Sportlife	s.t.

General classification after Paris–Roubaix

	Cyclist	Team	Points
1	Moreno Argentin (ITA)	Ariostea	43
2	John Talen (NED)	Panasonic–Sportlife	39
3	Gianni Bugno (ITA)	Chateau d'Ax–Salotti	34
4	Rudy Dhaenens (BEL)	PDM–Concorde–Ultima	34
5	Maurizio Fondriest (ITA)	Del Tongo	32
6	Gilles Delion (FRA)	Helvetia–La Suisse	27
7	Jean-Claude Colotti (FRA)	RMO	27
8	Eddy Planckaert (BEL)	Panasonic–Sportlife	25
9	Gilbert Duclos-Lassalle (FRA)	Z–Tomasso	23
10	Steve Bauer (CAN)	7-Eleven	22
10	Rolf Gölz (GER)	Buckler–Colnago–Decca	22

15 April 1990 — Liège–Bastogne–Liège 256 km (159.1 mi)

	Cyclist	Team	Time
1	Eric Van Lancker (BEL)	Panasonic–Sportlife	7h 10' 00"
2	Jean-Claude Leclercq (FRA)	Helvetia–La Suisse	+ 34"
3	Steven Rooks (NED)	Panasonic–Sportlife	s.t.
4	Rudy Dhaenens (BEL)	PDM–Concorde–Ultima	+ 1' 16"
5	Luc Roosen (BEL)	Histor–Sigma	s.t.
6	Moreno Argentin (ITA)	Ariostea	+ 1' 20"
7	Gianni Bugno (ITA)	Chateau d'Ax–Salotti	s.t.
8	Gert-Jan Theunisse (NED)	Panasonic–Sportlife	s.t.
9	Martin Earley (IRL)	PDM–Concorde–Ultima	s.t.
10	Atle Kvålsvoll (NOR)	Z–Tomasso	s.t.

General classification after Liège–Bastogne–Liège

	Cyclist	Team	Points
1	Moreno Argentin (ITA)	Ariostea	58
2	Rudy Dhaenens (BEL)	PDM–Concorde–Ultima	52
3	Gianni Bugno (ITA)	Chateau d'Ax–Salotti	48
4	John Talen (NED)	Panasonic–Sportlife	39
5	Maurizio Fondriest (ITA)	Del Tongo	32
6	Gilles Delion (FRA)	Helvetia–La Suisse	30
7	Jean-Claude Colotti (FRA)	RMO	27
8	Eric Van Lancker (BEL)	Panasonic–Sportlife	25
9	Eddy Planckaert (BEL)	Panasonic–Sportlife	25
10	Gilbert Duclos-Lassalle (FRA)	Z–Tomasso	23

21 April 1990 — Amstel Gold Race 249 km (154.7 mi)

	Cyclist	Team	Time
1	Adri van der Poel (NED)	Weinmann–SMM–Uster	6h 17' 17"
2	Luc Roosen (BEL)	Histor–Sigma	s.t.
3	Jelle Nijdam (NED)	Buckler–Colnago–Decca	s.t.
4	Jan Goessens (BEL)	Weinmann–SMM–Uster	s.t.
5	Franco Ballerini (ITA)	Del Tongo	s.t.
6	Jean-Claude Leclercq (FRA)	Helvetia–La Suisse	s.t.
7	Andreas Kappes (FRG)	Toshiba	s.t.
8	Gianni Bugno (ITA)	Chateau d'Ax–Salotti	s.t.
9	Johan Museeuw (BEL)	Lotto–Superclub	s.t.
10	Phil Anderson (AUS)	TVM	s.t.

General classification after Amstel Gold Race

	Cyclist	Team	Points
1	Moreno Argentin (ITA)	Ariostea	62
2	Gianni Bugno (ITA)	Chateau d'Ax–Salotti	61
3	Rudy Dhaenens (BEL)	PDM–Concorde–Ultima	60
4	John Talen (NED)	Panasonic–Sportlife	39
5	Adri van der Poel (NED)	Weinmann–SMM–Uster	38
6	Luc Roosen (BEL)	Histor–Sigma	38
7	Jean-Claude Leclercq (FRA)	Helvetia–La Suisse	37
8	Johan Museeuw (BEL)	Lotto–Superclub	33
9	Maurizio Fondriest (ITA)	Del Tongo	32
10	Gilles Delion (FRA)	Helvetia–La Suisse	30

29 July 1990 — Wincanton Classic 239 km (148.5 mi)

	Cyclist	Team	Time
1	Gianni Bugno (ITA)	Chateau d'Ax–Salotti	6h 09' 51"
2	Sean Kelly (IRL)	PDM–Concorde–Ultima	+ 13"
3	Rudy Dhaenens (BEL)	PDM–Concorde–Ultima	s.t.
4	Claudio Chiappucci (ITA)	Carrera Jeans–Vagabond	s.t.
5	Marc Sergeant (BEL)	Panasonic–Sportlife	s.t.
6	Michel Dernies (BEL)	Weinmann–SMM–Uster	s.t.
7	Sammie Moreels (BEL)	Lotto–Superclub	s.t.
8	Federico Echave (ESP)	CLAS–Cajastur	s.t.
9	Dirk De Wolf (BEL)	PDM–Concorde–Ultima	s.t.
10	Marino Lejarreta (ESP)	ONCE	s.t.

General classification after Wincanton Classic

	Cyclist	Team	Points
1	Gianni Bugno (ITA)	Chateau d'Ax–Salotti	86
2	Rudy Dhaenens (BEL)	PDM–Concorde–Ultima	80
3	Moreno Argentin (ITA)	Ariostea	62
4	John Talen (NED)	Panasonic–Sportlife	39
5	Adri van der Poel (NED)	Weinmann–SMM–Uster	38
6	Luc Roosen (BEL)	Histor–Sigma	38
7	Jean-Claude Leclercq (FRA)	Helvetia–La Suisse	37
8	Gilles Delion (FRA)	Helvetia–La Suisse	36
9	Johan Museeuw (BEL)	Lotto–Superclub	33
10	Maurizio Fondriest (ITA)	Del Tongo	32

11 August 1990 — Clásica de San Sebastián 248 km (154.1 mi)

	Cyclist	Team	Time
1	Miguel Induráin (ESP)	Banesto	6h 19' 59"
2	Laurent Jalabert (FRA)	Toshiba	+ 2' 24"
3	Sean Kelly (IRL)	PDM–Concorde–Ultima	s.t.
4	Tony Rominger (SUI)	Chateau d'Ax–Salotti	s.t.
5	Federico Echave (ESP)	CLAS–Cajastur	+ 2' 29"
6	Steve Bauer (CAN)	7-Eleven	s.t.
7	Enrique Aja (ESP)	Teka	s.t.
8	Jesús Rodríguez Magro (ESP)	Banesto	s.t.
9	Pascal Richard (SUI)	Helvetia–La Suisse	s.t.
10	Marino Lejarreta (ESP)	ONCE	s.t.

General classification after Clásica de San Sebastián

	Cyclist	Team	Points
1	Gianni Bugno (ITA)	Chateau d'Ax–Salotti	86
2	Rudy Dhaenens (BEL)	PDM–Concorde–Ultima	81
3	Moreno Argentin (ITA)	Ariostea	62
4	Sean Kelly (IRL)	PDM–Concorde–Ultima	42
5	John Talen (NED)	Panasonic–Sportlife	39
6	Adri van der Poel (NED)	Weinmann–SMM–Uster	38
7	Luc Roosen (BEL)	Histor–Sigma	38
8	Claudio Chiappucci (ITA)	Carrera Jeans–Vagabond	37*
9	Jean-Claude Leclercq (FRA)	Helvetia–La Suisse	37
10	Steve Bauer (CAN)	7-Eleven	37

* Chiappucci gained 38 points but sources say he has 37 points, maybe for some penalties.

19 August 1990 — Züri-Metzgete 240 km (149.1 mi)

	Cyclist	Team	Time
1	Charly Mottet (FRA)	RMO	6h 07' 08"
2	Greg LeMond (USA)	Z–Tomasso	s.t.
3	Claudio Chiappucci (ITA)	Carrera Jeans–Vagabond	s.t.
4	Marino Lejarreta (ESP)	ONCE	s.t.
5	Gianni Bugno (ITA)	Chateau d'Ax–Salotti	+ 39"
6	Rolf Sørensen (DEN)	Ariostea	s.t.
7	Franco Ballerini (ITA)	Del Tongo	s.t.
8	Iñaki Gastón (ESP)	CLAS–Cajastur	s.t.
9	Gilles Delion (FRA)	Helvetia–La Suisse	s.t.
10	Pedro Delgado (ESP)	Banesto	s.t.

General classification after Züri-Metzgete

	Cyclist	Team	Points
1	Gianni Bugno (ITA)	Chateau d'Ax–Salotti	102
2	Rudy Dhaenens (BEL)	PDM–Concorde–Ultima	81
3	Moreno Argentin (ITA)	Ariostea	62
4	Claudio Chiappucci (ITA)	Carrera Jeans–Vagabond	57*
5	Sean Kelly (IRL)	PDM–Concorde–Ultima	50
6	Gilles Delion (FRA)	Helvetia–La Suisse	48
7	Franco Ballerini (ITA)	Del Tongo	43
8	Marino Lejarreta (ESP)	ONCE	40
9	John Talen (NED)	Panasonic–Sportlife	39
10	Adri van der Poel (NED)	Weinmann–SMM–Uster	38
10	Luc Roosen (BEL)	Histor–Sigma	38

* Chiappucci gained 58 points but sources say he has 57 points, maybe for some penalties.

30 August 1990 — Grand Prix des Amériques 224 km (139.2 mi)

	Cyclist	Team	Time
1	Franco Ballerini (ITA)	Del Tongo	6h 02' 46"
2	Thomas Wegmüller (SUI)	Weinmann–SMM–Uster	+ 30"
3	Sammie Moreels (BEL)	Lotto–Superclub	+ 33"
4	Claudio Chiappucci (ITA)	Carrera Jeans–Vagabond	+ 41"
5	Steve Bauer (CAN)	7-Eleven	+ 1' 40"
6	Sean Kelly (IRL)	PDM–Concorde–Ultima	s.t.
7	Louis de Koning (NED)	Panasonic–Sportlife	s.t.
8	Rudy Dhaenens (BEL)	PDM–Concorde–Ultima	s.t.
9	Marco Lietti (ITA)	Ariostea	+ 3' 41"
10	Rudy Verdonck (BEL)	Lotto–Superclub	+ 3' 51"

General classification after Grand Prix des Amériques

	Cyclist	Team	Points
1	Gianni Bugno (ITA)	Chateau d'Ax–Salotti	112
2	Rudy Dhaenens (BEL)	PDM–Concorde–Ultima	94
3	Claudio Chiappucci (ITA)	Carrera Jeans–Vagabond	75*
4	Franco Ballerini (ITA)	Del Tongo	68
5	Sean Kelly (IRL)	PDM–Concorde–Ultima	65
6	Moreno Argentin (ITA)	Ariostea	62
7	Steve Bauer (CAN)	7-Eleven	53
8	Gilles Delion (FRA)	Helvetia–La Suisse	48
9	Thomas Wegmüller (SUI)	Weinmann–SMM–Uster	45
10	Marino Lejarreta (ESP)	ONCE	40

* Chiappucci gained 76 points but sources say he has 75 points, maybe for some penalties.

16 September 1990 — Grand Prix de la Libération 88.1 km (54.7 mi) (TTT)

	Team	Time
1	PDM–Concorde–Ultima	1h 41' 03"
2	ONCE	+ 24"
3	Buckler–Colnago–Decca	+ 53"
4	Histor–Sigma	
5	Chateau d'Ax–Salotti	
6	TVM	
7	Weinmann–SMM–Uster	
8	Stuttgart–Mercedes–Merckx–Puma	
9	Helvetia–La Suisse	
10	Panasonic–Sportlife	

General classification after Grand Prix de la Libération

	Cyclist	Team	Points
1	Gianni Bugno (ITA)	Chateau d'Ax–Salotti	112
2	Rudy Dhaenens (BEL)	PDM–Concorde–Ultima	94
3	Claudio Chiappucci (ITA)	Carrera Jeans–Vagabond	75*
4	Franco Ballerini (ITA)	Del Tongo	68
5	Sean Kelly (IRL)	PDM–Concorde–Ultima	65
6	Moreno Argentin (ITA)	Ariostea	62
7	Steve Bauer (CAN)	7-Eleven	53
8	Gilles Delion (FRA)	Helvetia–La Suisse	48
9	Thomas Wegmüller (SUI)	Weinmann–SMM–Uster	45
10	Marino Lejarreta (ESP)	ONCE	40

* Chiappucci gained 76 points but sources say he has 75 points, maybe for some penalties.

Grand Prix de la Libération gave no points in individual standing (only in team standing)

14 October 1990 — Paris-Tours 283 km (175.8 mi)

	Cyclist	Team	Time
1	Rolf Sørensen (DEN)	Ariostea	7h 09' 32"
2	Phil Anderson (AUS)	TVM	s.t.
3	Maurizio Fondriest (ITA)	Del Tongo	s.t.
4	Kim Andersen (DEN)	Z–Tomasso	s.t.
5	Andreas Kappes (GER)	Toshiba	s.t.
6	Carlo Bomans (BEL)	Weinmann–SMM–Uster	+ 4"
7	Wiebren Veenstra (NED)	Buckler–Colnago–Decca	s.t.
8	Sean Kelly (IRL)	PDM–Concorde–Ultima	s.t.
9	Frédéric Moncassin (FRA)	Castorama	s.t.
10	Adriano Baffi (ITA)	Ariostea	s.t.

General classification after Paris-Tours

	Cyclist	Team	Points
1	Gianni Bugno (ITA)	Chateau d'Ax–Salotti	112
2	Rudy Dhaenens (BEL)	PDM–Concorde–Ultima	95
3	Sean Kelly (IRL)	PDM–Concorde–Ultima	78
4	Claudio Chiappucci (ITA)	Carrera Jeans–Vagabond	75*
5	Franco Ballerini (ITA)	Del Tongo	71
6	Moreno Argentin (ITA)	Ariostea	62
7	Maurizio Fondriest (ITA)	Del Tongo	55
8	Steve Bauer (CAN)	7-Eleven	53
9	Rolf Sørensen (DEN)	Ariostea	52
10	Gilles Delion (FRA)	Helvetia–La Suisse	48

* Chiappucci gained 76 points but sources say he has 75 points, maybe for some penalties.

20 October 1990 — Giro di Lombardia 246 km (152.9 mi)

	Cyclist	Team	Time
1	Gilles Delion (FRA)	Helvetia–La Suisse	6h 11' 45"
2	Pascal Richard (SUI)	Helvetia–La Suisse	s.t.
3	Charly Mottet (FRA)	RMO	s.t.
4	Robert Millar (GBR)	Z–Tomasso	s.t.
5	Federico Echave (ESP)	CLAS–Cajastur	s.t.
6	Claude Criquielion (BEL)	Lotto–Superclub	+ 3' 35"
7	Leonardo Sierra (VEN)	Selle Italia–Eurocar–Mosoca–Galli	s.t.
8	Marino Lejarreta (ESP)	ONCE	+ 3' 38"
9	Thomas Wegmüller (SUI)	Weinmann–SMM–Uster	+ 3' 56"
10	Sean Kelly (IRL)	PDM–Concorde–Ultima	+ 4' 06"

General classification after Giro di Lombardia

	Cyclist	Team	Points
1	Gianni Bugno (ITA)	Chateau d'Ax–Salotti	120
2	Rudy Dhaenens (BEL)	PDM–Concorde–Ultima	95
3	Sean Kelly (IRL)	PDM–Concorde–Ultima	89
4	Franco Ballerini (ITA)	Del Tongo	81
5	Claudio Chiappucci (ITA)	Carrera Jeans–Vagabond	75*
6	Gilles Delion (FRA)	Helvetia–La Suisse	73
7	Moreno Argentin (ITA)	Ariostea	62
8	Thomas Wegmüller (SUI)	Weinmann–SMM–Uster	57
9	Maurizio Fondriest (ITA)	Del Tongo	55
10	Steve Bauer (CAN)	7-Eleven	53
10	Marino Lejarreta (ESP)	ONCE	53

* Chiappucci gained 76 points but sources say he has 75 points, maybe for some penalties.

27 October 1990 — World Cup Finale 50 km (31.1 mi) (ITT)

	Cyclist	Team	Time
1	Erik Breukink (NED)	PDM–Concorde–Ultima	1h 02' 48"
2	Tony Rominger (SUI)	Chateau d'Ax–Salotti	+ 34"
3	Federico Echave (ESP)	CLAS–Cajastur	+ 41"
4	Eric Van Lancker (BEL)	Panasonic–Sportlife	+ 1' 06"
5	Charly Mottet (FRA)	RMO	+ 1' 20"
6	Steve Bauer (CAN)	7-Eleven	+ 1' 29"
7	Rolf Sørensen (DEN)	Ariostea	+ 1' 43"
8	Gianni Bugno (ITA)	Chateau d'Ax–Salotti	+ 1' 56"
9	Marino Lejarreta (ESP)	ONCE	+ 2' 08"
10	Adri van der Poel (NED)	Weinmann–SMM–Uster	+ 2' 16"

General classification after World Cup Finale

	Cyclist	Team	Points
1	Gianni Bugno (ITA)	Chateau d'Ax–Salotti	133
2	Rudy Dhaenens (BEL)	PDM–Concorde–Ultima	99
3	Sean Kelly (IRL)	PDM–Concorde–Ultima	94
4	Franco Ballerini (ITA)	Del Tongo	89
5	Gilles Delion (FRA)	Helvetia–La Suisse	82
6	Claudio Chiappucci (ITA)	Carrera Jeans–Vagabond	78*
7	Steve Bauer (CAN)	7-Eleven	68
8	Thomas Wegmüller (SUI)	Weinmann–SMM–Uster	67
9	Rolf Sørensen (DEN)	Ariostea	66
10	Federico Echave (ESP)	CLAS–Cajastur	65
10	Marino Lejarreta (ESP)	ONCE	65

* Chiappucci gained 79 points but sources say he has 78 points, maybe for some penalties.

== Final standings ==
=== Individual ===
Points are awarded to the top 20 classified riders. All riders taking points are classified, there is no minimum races to start.

The points are awarded for every race using the following system:

Position	1st	2nd	3rd	4th	5th	6th	7th	8th	9th	10th	11th	12th	13th	14th	15th	16th	17th	18th	19th	20th
Points	25	22	20	18	16	15	14	13	12	11	10	9	8	7	6	5	4	3	2	1

Pos.	Rider	Team	MSR	ToF	ROU	LBL	AGR	WIN	CSS	ZUR	AME	LIB	TOU	LOM	FIN	Pts.
1	Gianni Bugno (ITA)	Chateau d'Ax–Salotti	25	9	0	14	13	25	0	16	10	**	0	8	13	133
2	Rudy Dhaenens (BEL)	PDM–Concorde–Ultima	0	22	12	18	8	20	1	0	13	**	1	0	4	99
3	Sean Kelly (IRL)	PDM–Concorde–Ultima	0	0	0	0	0	22	20	8	15	**	13	11	5	94
4	Franco Ballerini (ITA)	Del Tongo	0	11	2	0	16	0	0	14	25	**	3	10	8	89
5	Gilles Delion (FRA)	Helvetia–La Suisse	20	7	0	3	0	6	0	12	0	**	0	25	9	82
6	Claudio Chiappucci (ITA)	Carrera Jeans–Vagabond	0	0	0	0	10	18	10	20	18	**	0	0	3	78*
7	Steve Bauer (CAN)	7-Eleven	0	0	22	0	0	0	15	0	16	**	0	0	15	68
8	Thomas Wegmüller (SUI)	Weinmann–SMM–Uster	0	0	14	0	0	0	0	9	22	**	0	12	10	67
9	Rolf Sørensen (DEN)	Ariostea	7	0	0	0	0	5	0	15	0	**	25	0	14	66
10	Federico Echave (ESP)	CLAS–Cajastur	0	0	0	0	0	13	16	0	0	**	0	16	20	65
11	Marino Lejarreta (ESP)	ONCE	0	0	0	0	0	11	11	18	0	**	0	13	12	65
12	Moreno Argentin (ITA)	Ariostea	18	25	0	15	4	0	0	0	0	**	0	0	0	62
13	Maurizio Fondriest (ITA)	Del Tongo	16	16	0	0	0	0	3	0	0	**	20	0	7	62
14	Charly Mottet (FRA)	RMO	0	0	0	0	0	0	0	25	0	**	0	20	16	61
15	Adri van der Poel (NED)	Weinmann–SMM–Uster	0	0	13	0	25	0	0	0	0	**	0	0	11	49
16	Claude Criquielion (BEL)	Lotto–Superclub	0	13	0	7	5	0	0	0	0	**	0	15	6	46
18	Eric Van Lancker (BEL)	Panasonic–Sportlife	0	0	0	25	0	0	0	0	0	**	0	0	18	43
17	Andreas Kappes (GER)	Toshiba	10	3	0	0	14	0	0	0	0	**	16	0	0	43
19	Robert Millar (GBR)	Z–Tomasso	0	0	0	6	0	7	0	0	8	**	0	18	2	41
20	Tony Rominger (SUI)	Chateau d'Ax–Salotti	0	0	0	0	0	0	18	0	0	**	0	0	22	40
Race winners out of the top 20
Pos.	Rider	Team	MSR	ToF	ROU	LBL	AGR	WIN	CSS	ZUR	AME	LIB	TOU	LOM	FIN	Pts.
24	Miguel Induráin (ESP)	Banesto	0	0	0	9	2	0	25	0	0	**	0	0	0	36
34	Erik Breukink (NED)	PDM–Concorde–Ultima	0	0	0	0	0	0	0	0	1	**	0	0	25	26
35	Eddy Planckaert (BEL)	Panasonic–Sportlife	0	0	25	0	0	0	0	0	0	**	0	0	0	25

** Grand Prix de la Libération gave no points in individual standing (only in team standing)

* Chiappucci gained 79 points but sources say he has 78 points, maybe for some penalties.

Key
Colour	Result
Gold	Winner
Silver	2nd place
Bronze	3rd place
Green	Top ten position
Blue	Other points position
Purple	Out of points, retired or did not start

=== Teams ===
	Team	Points
1	PDM–Concorde–Ultima	92
2	Helvetia–La Suisse	77
3	Panasonic–Sportlife	59
4	Ariostea	55
5	Weinmann–SMM–Uster	52
