= 1990 Grand Prix des Amériques (cycling race) =

1990 UCI Road World Cup

Race details
- Dates: August 30, 1990
- Stages: 1
- Distance: 224 km (139.2 mi)
- Winning time: 6h 02' 46"

Results
	Winner	Franco Ballerini (ITA)	(Del Tongo)
	Second	Thomas Wegmüller (SUI)	(Weinmann–SMM–Uster)
	Third	Sammie Moreels (BEL)	(Lotto–Superclub)

The 1990 Grand Prix des Amériques was the 3rd edition of the Grand Prix des Amériques cycle race and was held on August 30, 1990. The race started and finished in Montreal. The race was won by Franco Ballerini of the Del Tongo team.

== General classification ==
Final general classification

	Cyclist	Team	Time
1	Franco Ballerini (ITA)	Del Tongo	6h 02' 46"
2	Thomas Wegmüller (SUI)	Weinmann–SMM–Uster	+ 30"
3	Sammie Moreels (BEL)	Lotto–Superclub	+ 33"
4	Claudio Chiappucci (ITA)	Carrera Jeans–Vagabond	+ 41"
5	Steve Bauer (CAN)	7-Eleven	+ 1' 40"
6	Sean Kelly (IRL)	PDM–Concorde–Ultima	s.t.
7	Louis de Koning (NED)	Panasonic–Sportlife	s.t.
8	Rudy Dhaenens (BEL)	PDM–Concorde–Ultima	s.t.
9	Marco Lietti (ITA)	Ariostea	+ 3' 41"
10	Rudy Verdonck (BEL)	Lotto–Superclub	+ 3' 51"
