= 1990 UCI Road World Cup Finale =

Road cycling race

1990 UCI Road World Cup

Race details
- Dates: 27 October 1990
- Stages: 1
- Distance: 50 km (31.07 mi)
- Winning time: 1h 02' 48"

Results
	Winner	Erik Breukink (NED)	(PDM–Concorde–Ultima)
	Second	Tony Rominger (SUI)	(Chateau d'Ax–Salotti)
	Third	Federico Echave (ESP)	(CLAS–Cajastur)

The 1990 UCI Road World Cup Finale, also known as the Grand Prix de Lunel, was the final event of the 1990 UCI Road World Cup and was held on 27 October. The race took place in and around Lunel in France. The event was an individual time trial and an invitation event. The invited riders are the single Cup race winners, the first 10 of the general classification before the last race, the first 10 in the World Ranking and the reigning World Champion. Some riders forfeit their right to start and some others in the high classification of World Cup are invited. The race was won by Erik Breukink of the PDM–Concorde–Ultima team.

== Results ==
	Cyclist	Team	Time
1	Erik Breukink (NED)	PDM–Concorde–Ultima	1h 02' 48"
2	Tony Rominger (SUI)	Chateau d'Ax–Salotti	+ 34"
3	Federico Echave (ESP)	CLAS–Cajastur	+ 41"
4	Eric Van Lancker (BEL)	Panasonic–Sportlife	+ 1' 06"
5	Charly Mottet (FRA)	RMO	+ 1' 20"
6	Steve Bauer (CAN)	7-Eleven	+ 1' 29"
7	Rolf Sørensen (DEN)	Ariostea	+ 1' 43"
8	Gianni Bugno (ITA)	Chateau d'Ax–Salotti	+ 1' 56"
9	Marino Lejarreta (ESP)	ONCE	+ 2' 08"
10	Adri van der Poel (NED)	Weinmann–SMM–Uster	+ 2' 16"
