= 1989 Amstel Gold Race =

1990 UCI Road World Cup, race 5 of 12

Race details
- Dates: 22 April 1989
- Stages: 1
- Distance: 242 km (150.4 mi)
- Winning time: 5h 59' 49"

Results
	Winner	Eric Van Lancker (BEL)	(Panasonic–Isostar–Colnago–Agu)
	Second	Claude Criquielion (BEL)	(Hitachi)
	Third	Steve Bauer (CAN)	(Helvetia–La Suisse)

The 1989 Amstel Gold Race was the 24th edition of the annual Amstel Gold Race road bicycle race, held on Sunday April 22, 1989, in the Dutch province of Limburg. The race stretched 242 kilometres, with the start in Heerlen and the finish in Meerssen. There were a total of 162 competitors, with 108 cyclists finishing the race.

== Results ==
	Rider	Team	Time
1	Eric Van Lancker (BEL)	Panasonic–Isostar–Colnago–Agu	5h 59' 49"
2	Claude Criquielion (BEL)	Hitachi	+ 19"
3	Steve Bauer (CAN)	Helvetia–La Suisse	s.t.
4	Nico Verhoeven (NED)	PDM–Ultima–Concorde	+ 20"
5	Mauro Gianetti (SUI)	Helvetia–La Suisse	+ 22"
6	Per Pedersen (DEN)	RMO	+ 1' 45"
7	Marc Madiot (FRA)	Toshiba	s.t.
8	Jozef Lieckens (BEL)	Hitachi	+ 1' 47"
9	Eddy Planckaert (BEL)	AD Renting–W-Cup–Bottecchia	s.t.
10	Adri van der Poel (NED)	Domex–Weinmann	s.t.
