= 1990 Scheldeprijs =

Race details
- Dates: 17 April 1990
- Stages: 1
- Distance: 200 km (124.3 mi)
- Winning time: 4h 42' 09"

Results
	Winner	John Talen (NED)	(Panasonic–Sportlife)
	Second	Eric Vanderaerden (BEL)	(Buckler–Colnago–Decca)
	Third	Johan Museeuw (BEL)	(Lotto–Superclub)

The 1990 Scheldeprijs was the 77th edition of the Scheldeprijs cycle race and was held on 17 April 1990. The race was won by John Talen of the Panasonic team.

== General classification ==
Final general classification

Rank	Rider	Team	Time
1	John Talen (NED)	Panasonic–Sportlife	4h 42' 09"
2	Eric Vanderaerden (BEL)	Buckler–Colnago–Decca	+ 3"
3	Johan Museeuw (BEL)	Lotto–Superclub	+ 3"
4	Gino de Backer (BEL)	IOC–Tulip Computers	+ 3"
5	Adri van der Poel (NED)	Weinmann–SMM–Uster	+ 3"
6	Johan Capiot (BEL)	TVM	+ 3"
7	Hendrik Redant (BEL)	Lotto–Superclub	+ 3"
8	Danny Neskens (BEL)	La William–Saltos	+ 3"
9	Wilfried Peeters (BEL)	Histor–Sigma	+ 3"
10	Chris Scharmin (BEL)	La William–Saltos	+ 3"
