= 1990 Wincanton Classic =

Road cycling race

1990 UCI Road World Cup

Race details
- Dates: 29 July 1990
- Stages: 1
- Distance: 239 km (148.5 mi)
- Winning time: 6h 09' 51"

Results
	Winner	Gianni Bugno (ITA)	(Chateau d'Ax–Salotti)
	Second	Sean Kelly (IRE)	(PDM–Concorde–Ultima)
	Third	Rudy Dhaenens (BEL)	(PDM–Concorde–Ultima)

The 1990 Wincanton Classic was the 2nd edition of the Wincanton Classic cycle race (also known as Leeds International Classic and Rochester International Classic) and was held on 29 July. The race took place in and around Brighton. The race was won by Gianni Bugno of the Chateau d'Ax–Salotti team.

== Results ==
	Rider	Team	Time
1	Gianni Bugno (ITA)	Chateau d'Ax–Salotti	6h 09' 51"
2	Sean Kelly (IRL)	PDM–Concorde–Ultima	+ 13"
3	Rudy Dhaenens (BEL)	PDM–Concorde–Ultima	s.t.
4	Claudio Chiappucci (ITA)	Carrera Jeans–Vagabond	s.t.
5	Marc Sergeant (BEL)	Panasonic–Sportlife	s.t.
6	Michel Dernies (BEL)	Weinmann–SMM–Uster	s.t.
7	Sammie Moreels (BEL)	Lotto–Superclub	s.t.
8	Federico Echave (ESP)	CLAS–Cajastur	s.t.
9	Dirk De Wolf (BEL)	PDM–Concorde–Ultima	s.t.
10	Marino Lejarreta (ESP)	ONCE	s.t.
