= 1990 Tour of Flanders =

74th Tour of Flanders
1990 UCI Road World Cup, race 2 of 13

Race details
- Dates: 1 April 1990
- Stages: 1
- Distance: 262 km (162.8 mi)
- Winning time: 6h 47' 25"

Results
	Winner	Moreno Argentin (ITA)	(Ariostea)
	Second	Rudy Dhaenens (BEL)	(PDM–Concorde)
	Third	John Talen (NED)	(Panasonic–Sportlife)

The 74th running of the Tour of Flanders cycling classic was held on Sunday, 1 April 1990. Italian Moreno Argentin won the race in a two-man sprint with Rudy Dhaenens. 102 of 194 riders finished the race.

== Race report ==
The race was run in exceptionally warm and sunny April weather. Italian Fabio Roscioli was the last survivor of an early breakaway, but was caught by a seven-man group on the Eikenberg. 30 from the finish, Laurent Fignon and Per Pedersen broke away from the group, but were counterattacked and dropped by Moreno Argentin and Rudy Dhaenens. Argentin, a four-time winner of Liège–Bastogne–Liège easily won the two-man sprint.

== Route ==
The race started in Sint-Niklaas and finished in Meerbeke (Ninove) – totaling 262 km.
The course featured 13 categorized climbs:

- Oude Kwaremont
- Paterberg
- Kortekeer
- Taaienberg
- Berg ten Houte
- Kouterberg
- Eikenberg
- Varent
- Leberg
- Molenberg
- Berendries
- Muur-Kapelmuur
- Bosberg

== Results ==
	Cyclist	Team	Time
1	Moreno Argentin (ITA)	Ariostea	6h 47' 25"
2	Rudy Dhaenens (BEL)	PDM–Concorde–Ultima	s.t.
3	John Talen (NED)	Panasonic–Sportlife	+ 11"
4	Carlo Bomans (BEL)	Weinmann–SMM–Uster	s.t.
5	Maurizio Fondriest (ITA)	Del Tongo	+ 14"
6	Jan Schur (GDR)	Chateau d'Ax–Salotti	+ 23"
7	Niki Rüttimann (SUI)	Helvetia–La Suisse	s.t.
8	Claude Criquielion (BEL)	Lotto–Superclub	+ 37"
9	Jean-Claude Colotti (FRA)	RMO	s.t.
10	Franco Ballerini (ITA)	Del Tongo	s.t.
