= 1988 Ronde van Nederland =

Cycling race

These are the results for the 28th edition of the Ronde van Nederland cycling race, which was held from August 15 to August 20, 1988. The race started in Groningen (Groningen) and finished after 859 kilometres in Gulpen (Limburg).

== Stages ==
Date	Stage	Length	Notes
August 15	Groningen-Groningen	4.6 km	Prologue
August 16	Groningen-Almelo	206 km	
August 17	Almelo-Huizen	193 km	
August 18	Huizen-Nieuwegein	146 km	
August 19	Nieuwegein-Beek/Ubbergen	109 km	
19 August	Groesbeek-Beek/Ubbergen	16.7 km	Time trial
20 August	Sittard-Gulpen	191 km	

== Final classification ==
Position	Name	Team	Time
1	Thierry Marie (FRA)	Système U–Gitane	20:58:48
2	Erik Breukink (NED)	Panasonic–Isostar–Colnago–Agu	+ 0.16
3	Peter Stevenhaagen (NED)	PDM–Ultima–Concorde	+ 0.26
4	Christophe Lavainne (FRA)	Système U–Gitane	+ 0.52
5	Charly Mottet (FRA)	Système U–Gitane	+ 0.56
6	John Talen (NED)	Panasonic–Isostar–Colnago–Agu	+ 0.57
7	Marc Sergeant (BEL)	Hitachi–Bosal–B.C.E. Snooker	+ 1.26
8	Jelle Nijdam (NED)	Superconfex–Yoko–Opel–Colnago	+ 2.52
9	Laurent Fignon (FRA)	Système U–Gitane	+ 2.59
10	Henk Lubberding (NED)	Panasonic–Isostar–Colnago–Agu	+ 3.10
