= 1990 Paris–Roubaix =

1990 Paris Roubaix
1990 UCI Road World Cup, race 3 of 13

Race details
- Dates: April 8, 1990
- Stages: 1
- Distance: 265 km (164.7 mi)
- Winning time: 7:37:02

Results
	Winner	Eddy Planckaert (Belgium)	(Panasonic - Sportlife)
	Second	Steve Bauer (Canada)	(7 Eleven - Hoonved)
	Third	Edwig Van Hooydonck (Belgium)	(Buckler - Colnago - Decca)

The 1990 Paris-Roubaix was the 88th edition of the Paris–Roubaix single-day cycling race.

== Results ==
	Cyclist	Team	Time
1	Eddy Planckaert (BEL)	Panasonic–Sportlife	7h 37' 02"
2	Steve Bauer (CAN)	7-Eleven	s.t.
3	Edwig Van Hooydonck (BEL)	Buckler–Colnago–Decca	s.t.
4	Martial Gayant (FRA)	Toshiba	s.t.
5	Jean-Marie Wampers (BEL)	Panasonic–Sportlife	+ 3"
6	Gilbert Duclos-Lassalle (FRA)	Z–Tomasso	s.t.
7	Thomas Wegmuller (SWI)	Weinmann–SMM–Uster	+ 7"
8	Adri van der Poel (NED)	Weinmann–SMM–Uster	+ 10"
9	Rudy Dhaenens (BEL)	PDM–Concorde–Ultima	s.t.
10	John Talen (NED)	Panasonic–Sportlife	s.t.
