= 1989 Grand Prix des Amériques (cycling race) =

1989 UCI Road World Cup

Race details
- Dates: 6 August 1989
- Stages: 1
- Distance: 224 km (139.2 mi)
- Winning time: 6h 03' 39"

Results
	Winner	Jörg Müller (SUI)	(PDM–Ultima–Concorde)
	Second	Yvon Madiot (FRA)	(Toshiba)
	Third	Charly Mottet (FRA)	(RMO)

The 1990 Grand Prix des Amériques was the 2nd edition of the Grand Prix des Amériques cycle race and was held on 6 August 1989. The race started and finished in Montreal. The race was won by Jörg Müller of the PDM–Ultima–Concorde team.

== General classification ==
Final general classification

	Cyclist	Team	Time
1	Jörg Müller (SUI)	PDM–Ultima–Concorde	6h 03' 39"
2	(France) Yvon Madiot	Toshiba	+ 45"
3	Charly Mottet (FRA)	RMO	+ 57"
4	Greg LeMond (USA)	AD Renting–W-Cup–Bottecchia	+ 1' 31"
5	Sean Kelly (IRL)	PDM–Ultima–Concorde	s.t.
6	Pascal Richard (SUI)	Helvetia–La Suisse	s.t.
7	Theo de Rooij (NED)	Panasonic–Isostar–Colnago–Agu	s.t.
8	Marc Madiot (FRA)	Toshiba	s.t.
9	Robert Millar (GBR)	Z–Peugeot	s.t.
10	Acácio da Silva (POR)	Carrera Jeans–Vagabond	s.t.
