= 1988 Paris–Roubaix =

Race details
- Dates: 10 April 1988
- Stages: 1
- Distance: 266 km (165.3 mi)
- Winning time: 6h 34' 18"

Results
	Winner	Dirk Demol (BEL)	(AD Renting–Mini-Flat–Enerday)
	Second	Thomas Wegmüller (SUI)	(Kas–Canal 10)
	Third	Laurent Fignon (FRA)	(Système U–Gitane)

The 1988 Paris–Roubaix was the 86th edition of the Paris–Roubaix cycle race and was held on 10 April 1988. The race started in Compiègne and finished in Roubaix. The race was won by Dirk Demol of the AD Renting team. Second place rider Thomas Wegmüller was impeded in his final sprint finish because a plastic bag became entangled in his gears.

== General classification ==
Final general classification

Rank	Rider	Team	Time
1	Dirk Demol (BEL)	AD Renting–Mini-Flat–Enerday	6h 34' 18"
2	Thomas Wegmüller (SUI)	Kas–Canal 10	+ 2"
3	Laurent Fignon (FRA)	Système U–Gitane	+ 1' 55"
4	Stephan Joho (SUI)	Ariostea–Gres	+ 1' 55"
5	Marc Sergeant (BEL)	Hitachi–Bosal–B.C.E. Snooker	+ 1' 55"
6	Corné van Rijen (NED)	Panasonic–Isostar–Colnago–Agu	+ 2' 03"
7	Gerard Veldscholten (NED)	Weinmann–La Suisse–SMM Uster	+ 2' 03"
8	Steve Bauer (CAN)	Weinmann–La Suisse–SMM Uster	+ 2' 34"
9	Herman Frison (BEL)	Roland	+ 2' 46"
10	Johan Lammerts (BEL)	Toshiba–Look	+ 2' 46"
