= 1990 Gent–Wevelgem =

- Official poster of the event

Race details
- Dates: 4 April 1990
- Stages: 1
- Distance: 204 km (127 mi)
- Winning time: 4h 59' 00"

Results
	Winner	Herman Frison (BEL)	(Histor–Sigma)
	Second	Johan Museeuw (BEL)	(Lotto–Superclub)
	Third	Franco Ballerini (ITA)	(Del Tongo)

The 1990 Gent–Wevelgem was the 52nd edition of the Belgian Gent–Wevelgem cycle race and was held on 4 April 1990. The race started in Ghent and finished in Wevelgem. The race was won by Herman Frison of the Histor–Sigma team.

== General classification ==
Final general classification

Rank	Rider	Team	Time
1	Herman Frison (BEL)	Histor–Sigma	4h 59' 00"
2	Johan Museeuw (BEL)	Lotto–Superclub	+ 0"
3	Franco Ballerini (ITA)	Del Tongo	+ 0"
4	Frans Maassen (NED)	Buckler–Colnago–Decca	+ 0"
5	Jean-Marie Wampers (BEL)	Panasonic–Sportlife	+ 2"
6	Brian Holm (DEN)	Histor–Sigma	+ 4"
7	Olaf Ludwig (FRG)	Panasonic–Sportlife	+ 4"
8	Dimitri Konyshev (URS)	Alfa Lum	+ 4"
9	Steve Bauer (CAN)	7-Eleven	+ 4"
10	Rudy Dhaenens (BEL)	PDM–Concorde–Ultima	+ 4"
