= Grand Prix des Amériques =

Grand Prix des Amériques may refer to:

- Grand Prix des Amériques (cycling race), a cycling race held between 1988 and 1992
- Grand Prix des Amériques (film award), an award given at the Montreal World Film Festival
