= Jan van Wijk =

Dutch cyclist

Personal information
- Born: 7 January 1962 (age 64) Haarlem, Netherlands

Cycling career
- Sport: Cycling
- Discipline: Road
- Role: Rider

Professional teams
- 1986: PDM–Ultima–Concorde
- 1987–1988: Panasonic–Isostar
- 1989–1990: TVM–Ragno

Jan van Wijk (born 7 January 1962) is a Dutch former professional racing cyclist. He rode in the 1986 Tour de France.
