= 1990 Amstel Gold Race =

Dutch cycling race

1990 UCI Road World Cup, race 5 of 13

Race details
- Dates: 21 April 1990
- Stages: 1
- Distance: 249 km (154.7 mi)
- Winning time: 6h 17' 17"

Results
	Winner	Adri van der Poel (NED)	(Weinmann–SMM–Uster)
	Second	Luc Roosen (BEL)	(Histor–Sigma)
	Third	Jelle Nijdam (NED)	(Buckler–Colnago–Decca)

The 1990 Amstel Gold Race was the 25th edition of the annual Amstel Gold Race road bicycle race, held on Sunday April 21, 1990, in the Dutch province of Limburg. The race stretched 249 kilometres, with the start in Heerlen and the finish in Meerssen. There were a total of 191 competitors, with 97 cyclists finishing the race.

== Results ==
	Cyclist	Team	Time
1	Adri van der Poel (NED)	Weinmann–SMM–Uster	6h 17' 17"
2	Luc Roosen (BEL)	Histor–Sigma	s.t.
3	Jelle Nijdam (NED)	Buckler–Colnago–Decca	s.t.
4	Jan Goessens (BEL)	Weinmann–SMM–Uster	s.t.
5	Franco Ballerini (ITA)	Del Tongo	s.t.
6	Jean-Claude Leclercq (FRA)	Helvetia–La Suisse	s.t.
7	Andreas Kappes (FRG)	Toshiba	s.t.
8	Gianni Bugno (ITA)	Chateau d'Ax–Salotti	s.t.
9	Johan Museeuw (BEL)	Lotto–Superclub	s.t.
10	Phil Anderson (AUS)	TVM	s.t.
