= 1990 Züri-Metzgete =

1990 UCI Road World Cup

Race details
- Dates: 19 August 1990
- Stages: 1
- Distance: 240 km (149.1 mi)
- Winning time: 6h 28' 13"

Results
	Winner	Charly Mottet (FRA)	(RMO)
	Second	Greg LeMond (USA)	(Z–Tomasso)
	Third	Claudio Chiappucci (ITA)	(Carrera Jeans–Vagabond)

The 1990 Züri-Metzgete was the 75th edition of the Züri-Metzgete road cycling one day race. It was held on 19 August 1990 as part of the 1990 UCI Road World Cup. The race was won by Charly Mottet of RMO team.

== Results ==
	Rider	Team	Time
1	Charly Mottet (FRA)	RMO	6h 07' 08"
2	Greg LeMond (USA)	Z–Tomasso	s.t.
3	Claudio Chiappucci (ITA)	Carrera Jeans–Vagabond	s.t.
4	Marino Lejarreta (ESP)	ONCE	s.t.
5	Gianni Bugno (ITA)	Chateau d'Ax–Salotti	+ 39"
6	Rolf Sørensen (DEN)	Ariostea	s.t.
7	Franco Ballerini (ITA)	Del Tongo	s.t.
8	Iñaki Gastón (ESP)	CLAS–Cajastur	s.t.
9	Gilles Delion (FRA)	Helvetia–La Suisse	s.t.
10	Pedro Delgado (ESP)	Banesto	s.t.
