= 1990 Giro di Lombardia =

Race details
- Dates: 20 October 1990
- Stages: 1
- Distance: 246 km (152.9 mi)
- Winning time: 6h 11' 45"

Results
	Winner	Gilles Delion (FRA)	(Helvetia–La Suisse)
	Second	Pascal Richard (SUI)	(Helvetia–La Suisse)
	Third	Charly Mottet (FRA)	(RMO)

The 1990 Giro di Lombardia was the 84th edition of the Giro di Lombardia cycle race and was held on 20 October 1990. The race started and finished in Monza. The race was won by Gilles Delion of the Helvetia–La Suisse team.

== General classification ==
Final general classification

Rank	Rider	Team	Time
1	Gilles Delion (FRA)	Helvetia–La Suisse	6h 11' 45"
2	Pascal Richard (SUI)	Helvetia–La Suisse	+ 0"
3	Charly Mottet (FRA)	RMO	+ 0"
4	Robert Millar (GBR)	Z–Tomasso	+ 0"
5	Federico Echave (ESP)	CLAS–Cajastur	+ 0"
6	Claude Criquielion (BEL)	Lotto–Superclub	+ 3' 35"
7	Leonardo Sierra (VEN)	Selle Italia–Eurocar–Mosoca–Galli	+ 3' 35"
8	Marino Lejarreta (ESP)	ONCE	+ 3' 38"
9	Thomas Wegmüller (SUI)	Weinmann–SMM–Uster	+ 3' 56"
10	Sean Kelly (IRL)	PDM–Concorde–Ultima	+ 4' 06"
