= 1992 Tour du Haut Var =

Race details
- Dates: 22 February 1992
- Stages: 1
- Distance: 199 km (123.7 mi)
- Winning time: 5h 23' 52"

Results
| | Winner | Gérard Rué (FRA) |
| | Second | Fabian Jeker (SUI) |
| | Third | Frédéric Moncassin (FRA) |

The 1992 Tour du Haut Var was the 24th edition of the Tour du Haut Var cycle race and was held on 22 February 1992. The race started in Grimaud and finished in Draguignan. The race was won by Gérard Rué.

== General classification ==
Final general classification

| Rank | Rider | Time |
|---|---|---|
| 1 | Gérard Rué (FRA) | 5h 23' 52" |
| 2 | Fabian Jeker (SUI) | + 0" |
| 3 | Frédéric Moncassin (FRA) | + 10" |
| 4 | Sammie Moreels (BEL) | + 10" |
| 5 | Etienne De Wilde (BEL) | + 10" |
| 6 | Hans Kindberg (SWE) | + 10" |
| 7 | Frankie Andreu (USA) | + 10" |
| 8 | Andrea Ferrigato (ITA) | + 10" |
| 9 | Marco Saligari (ITA) | + 10" |
| 10 | Davide Cassani (ITA) | + 10" |
