= 1989 Züri-Metzgete =

1989 UCI Road World Cup

Race details
- Dates: 20 August 1989
- Stages: 1
- Distance: 255.5 km (158.8 mi)
- Winning time: 6h 45' 11"

Results
	Winner	Steve Bauer (CAN)	(Helvetia–La Suisse)
	Second	Acácio da Silva (POR)	(Carrera Jeans–Vagabond)
	Third	Rolf Gölz (GER)	(Superconfex–Yoko–Opel–Colnago)

The 1989 Züri-Metzgete was the 74th edition of the Züri-Metzgete road cycling one day race. It was held on 20 August 1989 as part of the 1989 UCI Road World Cup. The race was won by Steve Bauer of Helvetia–La Suisse team.

== Results ==
	Rider	Team	Time
1	Steve Bauer (CAN)	Helvetia–La Suisse	6h 45' 11"
2	Acácio da Silva (POR)	Carrera Jeans–Vagabond	+ 3"
3	Rolf Gölz (GER)	Superconfex–Yoko–Opel–Colnago	s.t.
4	Rolf Sørensen (DEN)	Ariostea	s.t.
5	Raúl Alcalá (MEX)	PDM–Ultima–Concorde	s.t.
6	Andreas Kappes (GER)	Toshiba	s.t.
7	Tony Rominger (SUI)	Chateau d'Ax	s.t.
8	Marc Madiot (FRA)	Toshiba	s.t.
9	Bruno Cornillet (FRA)	Z–Peugeot	s.t.
10	Maurizio Fondriest (ITA)	Del Tongo	+ 1' 21"
