= 1988 Omloop Het Volk =

Race details
- Dates: 5 March 1988
- Stages: 1
- Distance: 246 km (153 mi)
- Winning time: 5h 50' 00"

Results
	Winner	Ronny Van Holen (BEL)
	Second	Johan Lammerts (NED)
	Third	John Talen (NED)

The 1988 Omloop Het Volk was the 42nd edition of the Omloop Het Volk cycle race and was held on 5 March 1988. The race started and finished in Sint-Amandsberg. The race was won by Ronny Van Holen.

== General classification ==
Final general classification
Rank	Rider	Time
1	Ronny Van Holen (BEL)	5h 50' 00"
2	Johan Lammerts (NED)	+ 7"
3	John Talen (NED)	+ 18"
4	Rudy Dhaenens (BEL)	+ 18"
5	Hendrik Redant (BEL)	+ 18"
6	Etienne De Wilde (BEL)	+ 18"
7	Sean Kelly (IRL)	+ 18"
8	Carlo Bomans (BEL)	+ 18"
9	Henri Manders (NED)	+ 18"
10	Marc Sergeant (BEL)	+ 18"
