= 1990 Milan–San Remo =

1990 UCI Road World Cup, race 1 of 13

Race details
- Dates: 17 March 1990
- Stages: 1
- Distance: 294 km (183 mi)
- Winning time: 6h 25' 06"

Results
	Winner	Gianni Bugno (ITA)	(Chateau d'Ax–Salotti)
	Second	Rolf Gölz (GER)	(Buckler–Colnago–Decca)
	Third	Gilles Delion (FRA)	(Helvetia–La Suisse)

The 1990 Milan–San Remo was the 81st edition of the Milan–San Remo cycle race and was held on 17 March 1990. The race started in Milan and finished in San Remo. The race was won by Gianni Bugno of the Chateau d'Ax team.

For 34 years the 1990 race remained the fastest edition of Milan–San Remo at an average speed of 45.806 km/h (28.463 mph). This was surpassed by the 2024 edition won by Jasper Philipsen.

== General classification ==
Final general classification

Rank	Rider	Team	Time
1	Gianni Bugno (ITA)	Chateau d'Ax–Salotti	6h 25' 06"
2	Rolf Gölz (GER)	Buckler–Colnago–Decca	+ 4"
3	Gilles Delion (FRA)	Helvetia–La Suisse	+ 23"
4	Moreno Argentin (ITA)	Ariostea	+ 31"
5	Maurizio Fondriest (ITA)	Del Tongo	+ 31"
6	Jean-Claude Colotti (FRA)	RMO	+ 31"
7	Jesper Skibby (DEN)	TVM	+ 31"
8	Adriano Baffi (ITA)	Ariostea	+ 1' 02"
9	Johan Museeuw (BEL)	Lotto–Superclub	+ 1' 02"
10	William Dazzani (ITA)	Italbonifica–Navigare	+ 1' 02"
