= 1990 Liège–Bastogne–Liège =

1990 UCI Road World Cup, race 4 of 13

Race details
- Dates: 15 April 1990
- Stages: 1
- Distance: 256 km (159 mi)
- Winning time: 7h 10' 00"

Results
	Winner	Eric Van Lancker (BEL)	(Panasonic–Sportlife)
	Second	Jean-Claude Leclercq (FRA)	(Helvetia–La Suisse)
	Third	Steven Rooks (NED)	(Panasonic–Sportlife)

The 1990 Liège–Bastogne–Liège was the 76th edition of the Liège–Bastogne–Liège cycle race and was held on 15 April 1990. The race started and finished in Liège. The race was won by Eric Van Lancker of the Panasonic team.

== General classification ==
Final general classification

Rank	Rider	Team	Time
1	Eric Van Lancker (BEL)	Panasonic–Sportlife	7h 10' 00"
2	Jean-Claude Leclercq (FRA)	Helvetia–La Suisse	+ 34"
3	Steven Rooks (NED)	Panasonic–Sportlife	+ 34"
4	Rudy Dhaenens (BEL)	PDM–Concorde–Ultima	+ 1' 16"
5	Luc Roosen (BEL)	Histor–Sigma	+ 1' 16"
6	Moreno Argentin (ITA)	Ariostea	+ 1' 20"
7	Gianni Bugno (ITA)	Chateau d'Ax–Salotti	+ 1' 20"
8	Gert-Jan Theunisse (NED)	Panasonic–Sportlife	+ 1' 20"
9	Martin Earley (IRL)	PDM–Concorde–Ultima	+ 1' 20"
10	Atle Kvålsvoll (NOR)	Z–Tomasso	+ 1' 20"
