= 1985 Tour du Haut Var =

Race details
- Dates: 24 February 1985
- Stages: 1
- Distance: 185.4 km (115.2 mi)
- Winning time: 5h 21' 14"

Results
	Winner	Charly Mottet (FRA)
	Second	Éric Caritoux (FRA)
	Third	Steve Bauer (CAN)

The 1985 Tour du Haut Var was the 17th edition of the Tour du Haut Var cycle race and was held on 24 February 1985. The race started in Draguignan and finished in Seillans. The race was won by Charly Mottet.

== General classification ==
Final general classification

Rank	Rider	Time
1	Charly Mottet (FRA)	5h 21' 14"
2	Éric Caritoux (FRA)	+ 0"
3	Steve Bauer (CAN)	+ 6"
4	Pedro Muñoz (ESP)	+ 6"
5	Stephen Roche (IRL)	+ 7"
6	Pascal Simon (FRA)	+ 7"
7	Robert Millar (GBR)	+ 7"
8	François Lemarchand (FRA)	+ 7"
9	Robert Forest (FRA)	+ 33"
10	Jean-Marie Grezet (SUI)	+ 49"
