= Thomas Wegmüller =

Swiss cyclist

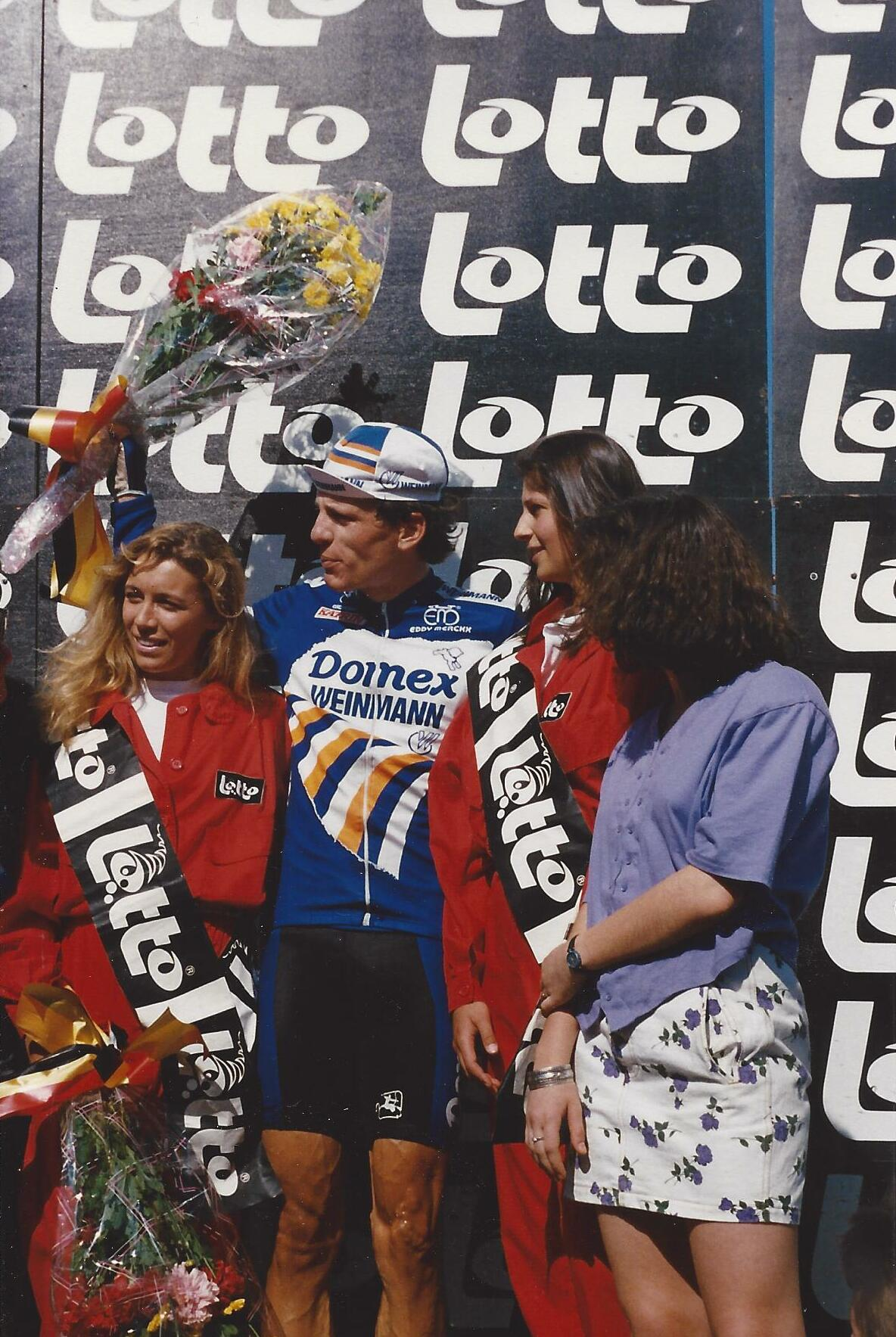
- Wegmüller in 1989

Personal information
- Born: 28 September 1960 (age 66) Bern, Switzerland

Cycling career
- Sport: Cycling
- Discipline: Road
- Role: Rider

Professional teams
- 1987–1988: Kas
- 1989–1991: Domex–Weinmann
- 1992–1993: Lotus–Festina

Thomas Wegmüller (born 28 September 1960) is a former Swiss racing cyclist. He rode in the Tour de France, the Vuelta a España, won a stage in the 1989 Critérium du Dauphiné Libéré and was named the Most Combative rider on the Champs-Élysées stage during the 1990 Tour de France. He was the Swiss National Road Race champion in 1992.

== Major results ==
1987
1st GP Lugano
1st Kaistenberg Rundfahrt
1st Stage 6 GP Tell
2nd Tour du Nord-Ouest
3rd Grand Prix de Mauléon-Moulins
1988
1st Stage 5 Tour of Britain
2nd Paris–Roubaix
5th Grand Prix des Nations
7th GP Ouest France-Plouay
1989
1st Grand Prix de Wallonie
1st Stage 2 Critérium du Dauphiné Libéré
2nd Grand Prix des Nations
2nd Tour du Nord-Ouest
3rd Overall Tour of Ireland
5th GP Ouest France-Plouay
5th Wartenberg Rundfahrt
1990
1st Grand Prix des Nations
1st Kaistenberg Rundfahrt
1st Tour du Nord-Ouest
2nd GP des Amériques
3rd GP Ouest France-Plouay
3rd Tre Valli Varesine
7th Paris–Roubaix
9th Giro di Lombardia
1991
1st Stage 4 Vuelta Asturias
3rd Grand Prix des Nations
4th Overall Tirreno–Adriatico
4th GP Ouest France-Plouay
8th Overall Étoile de Bessèges
1992
1st Road race, National Road Championships
1st Stage 3 Clásico RCN
2nd Tour of Flanders
2nd Tre Valli Varesine
5th Grand Prix des Nations
1993
1st Stage 3 Volta a Portugal
7th Japan Cup Cycle Road Race

=== Grand Tour general classification results timeline ===
Grand Tour	1989	1990	1991	1992
Giro d'Italia	—	—	—	—
Tour de France	100	112	155	—
Vuelta a España	—	—	—	128

Legend
DSQ	Disqualified
DNF	Did not finish
