= 1989 Liège–Bastogne–Liège =

1989 UCI Road World Cup, race 4 of 12

Race details
- Dates: 16 April 1989
- Stages: 1
- Distance: 267 km (166 mi)
- Winning time: 7h 23' 40"

Results
	Winner	Sean Kelly (IRL)	(PDM–Ultima–Concorde)
	Second	Fabrice Philipot (FRA)	(Toshiba)
	Third	Phil Anderson (AUS)	(TVM–Ragno)

The 1989 Liège–Bastogne–Liège was the 75th edition of the Liège–Bastogne–Liège cycle race and was held on 16 April 1989. The race started and finished in Liège. The race was won by Sean Kelly of the PDM team.

== General classification ==
Final general classification

Rank	Rider	Team	Time
1	Sean Kelly (IRL)	PDM–Ultima–Concorde	7h 23' 40"
2	Fabrice Philipot (FRA)	Toshiba	+ 0"
3	Phil Anderson (AUS)	TVM–Ragno	+ 0"
4	Pedro Delgado (ESP)	Reynolds	+ 0"
5	Sammie Moreels (BEL)	Lotto–Vlaanderen–Jong–Mbk–Merckx	+ 0"
6	Steven Rooks (NED)	PDM–Ultima–Concorde	+ 0"
7	Laurent Fignon (FRA)	Super U–Raleigh–Fiat	+ 0"
8	Eric Van Lancker (BEL)	Panasonic–Isostar–Colnago–Agu	+ 0"
9	Bruno Cornillet (FRA)	Z–Peugeot	+ 0"
10	Miguel Induráin (ESP)	Reynolds	+ 0"
