= John Talen =

Dutch cyclist (born 1965)

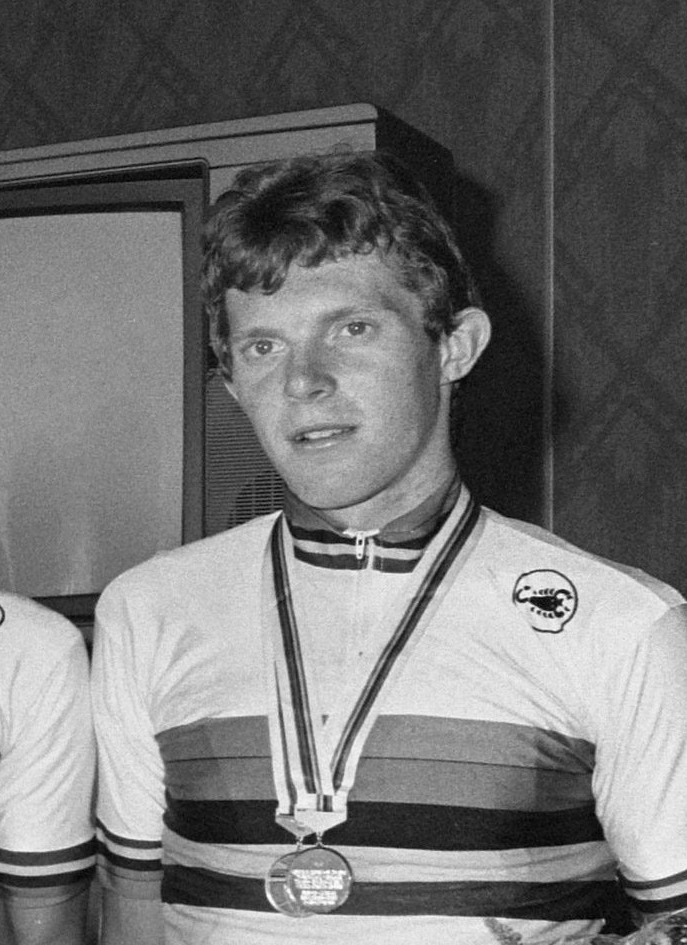
- John Talen in 1986

Personal information
- Full name: John Talen
- Born: 18 January 1965 (age 61) Meppel, the Netherlands

Cycling career
- Sport: Cycling
- Discipline: Road
- Role: Rider

Professional teams
- 1987–1990: Panasonic–Isostar
- 1991–1992: PDM–Concorde–Ultima
- 1993: TVM–Bison Kit
- 1994–1995: Mercatone Uno–Medeghini
- 1996–1997: Foreldorado
- 1999: Batavus
- 2000: Telekom Malaysia Cycling Team
- 2000: Spar

Major wins
- 100 km Team Time Trial World Championships; Dwars door Vlaanderen
Medal record
Representing Netherlands
Men's road bicycle racing
World Championships
| Gold medal – first place | 1986 Colorado Springs | Team time trial |
| Silver medal – second place | 1986 Colorado Springs | Road race |

John Talen (born 18 January 1965) is a former road racing cyclist from the Netherlands, who was a professional from 1987 to 2000. As an amateur his most notable achievement came when he won the world title in the 100 km team time trial, alongside Rob Harmeling, Tom Cordes and Gerrit de Vries, while also finishing second in the individual road race.

His biggest individual success as a pro was winning Dwars door Vlaanderen (1988) and the Scheldeprijs (1990). Talen rode in three editions of the Tour de France. In the 1994 Tour de France, he was last in the general classification, the lanterne rouge.

== Major results ==
1984
1st Stage 5 Olympia's Tour
1985
1st Overall Olympia's Tour
1986
2nd Overall Olympia's Tour

1st Stage 3

2nd Gran Premio della Liberazione
3rd Overall Circuit Cycliste Sarthe

1st Stage 3

1987
4th Omloop Het Volk
1988
1st Dwars door Vlaanderen
1st Grand Prix Pino Cerami
3rd Omloop Het Volk
6th Overall Ronde van Nederland
6th Overall KBC Driedaagse van De Panne-Koksijde
9th Overall Étoile de Bessèges
1989
1st Circuito de Getxo
1990
1st Scheldeprijs
1st Stage 1 Tirreno–Adriatico (ITT)
3rd Tour of Flanders
10th Paris–Roubaix
1991
1st Prologue Critérium du Dauphiné Libéré
1st Stage 3 Vuelta a Burgos
1st Stage 1a Vuelta a los Valles Mineros
2nd Overall Herald Sun Tour

1st Stage 2

3rd Veenendaal–Veenendaal
1993
1st Stage 2b Hofbrau Cup
1994
8th Memorial Samyn
1997
1st Nationale Sluitingprijs - Putte - Kapellen
1st Stage 1 Olympia's Tour
2nd Omloop van het Houtland Lichtervelde
2nd Hel van het Mergelland
1998
1st Stage 10 Olympia's Tour
7th Brussel-Ingooigem
1999
1st Stage 3 Olympia's Tour
2nd Omloop van het Houtland Lichtervelde
3rd Le Samyn
4th Omloop van het Waasland - Kemzeke
2000
2nd Kampioenschap van Vlaanderen
10th Nationale Sluitingprijs - Putte - Kapellen
2001
1st Stage 7 Ruban Granitier Breton
5th Omloop van het Houtland Lichtervelde
9th GP Rudy Dhaenens

== Tour de France ==
- 1988 – 150th
- 1993 – 122nd
- 1994 – 117th (Lanterne rouge)
