= 1990 Paris–Tours =

Race details
- Dates: 14 October 1990
- Stages: 1
- Distance: 283 km (175.8 mi)
- Winning time: 7h 09' 32"

Results
	Winner	Rolf Sørensen (DEN)	(Ariostea)
	Second	Phil Anderson (AUS)	(TVM)
	Third	Maurizio Fondriest (ITA)	(Del Tongo)

The 1990 Paris–Tours was the 84th edition of the Paris–Tours cycle race and was held on 14 October 1990. The race started in Chaville and finished in Tours. The race was won by Rolf Sørensen of the Ariostea team.

== General classification ==
Final general classification

Rank	Rider	Team	Time
1	Rolf Sørensen (DEN)	Ariostea	7h 09' 32"
2	Phil Anderson (AUS)	TVM	+ 0"
3	Maurizio Fondriest (ITA)	Del Tongo	+ 0"
4	Kim Andersen (DEN)	Z–Tomasso	+ 0"
5	Andreas Kappes (GER)	Toshiba	+ 0"
6	Carlo Bomans (BEL)	Weinmann–SMM–Uster	+ 4"
7	Wiebren Veenstra (NED)	Buckler–Colnago–Decca	+ 4"
8	Sean Kelly (IRL)	PDM–Concorde–Ultima	+ 4"
9	Frédéric Moncassin (FRA)	Castorama	+ 4"
10	Adriano Baffi (ITA)	Ariostea	+ 4"
