= Sammie Moreels =

Belgian cyclist

Personal information
- Born: 27 November 1965 (age 60) Ghent, Belgium

Cycling career
- Sport: Cycling
- Discipline: Road
- Role: Rider

Professional teams
- 1989–1992: Lotto–Vlaanderen–Jong–Mbk–Merckx
- 1993–1994: WordPerfect–Colnago–Decca
- 1995: Lotto–Isoglass
- 1996: Palmans–Boghemans

Sammie Moreels (born 27 November 1965) is a Belgian former professional racing cyclist. He rode in three editions of the Tour de France.

== Major results ==
1984
3rd Road race, National Junior Road Championships
1988
1st Stage 4a Circuit Cycliste Sarthe
2nd Kattekoers
1989
1st Grand Prix d'Isbergues
1st Stage 5 Tour du Vaucluse
2nd Paris–Camembert
4th La Flèche Wallonne
5th Liège–Bastogne–Liège
6th Paris–Tours
8th GP Villafranca de Ordizia
8th Overall Tour de la Communauté Européenne
9th Wincanton Classic
1990
1st Stage 2 Tour of Galicia
2nd GP Stad Zottegem
3rd GP des Amériques
7th Wincanton Classic
1991
1st Cholet-Pays de Loire
1st GP du Canton d'Argovie
3rd Gran Piemonte
3rd Grand Prix de Wallonie
3rd Milano–Torino
5th Rund um den Henninger Turm
5th GP Stad Zottegem
9th Giro di Lombardia
1992
1st Trofeo Laigueglia
3rd Grand Prix de Wallonie
4th Overall Tour du Haut Var
5th Overall Vuelta a los Valles Mineros
1993
1st Kampioenschap van Vlaanderen
1st Stage 4 Vuelta a Andalucía
9th Paris–Brussels
1994
7th GP Stad Zottegem
1995
3rd Grand Prix d'Isbergues
10th Grand Prix de Wallonie
1996
10th Le Samyn
