= Züri-Metzgete =

Cycling race

Race details
- Date: Early October
- Region: Zürich, Switzerland
- English name: Championship of Zürich
- Local name(s): Züri-Metzgete (Zürich German); Meisterschaft von Zürich (in German)
- Discipline: Road race
- Competition: UCI Road World Cup (1984–2004); UCI ProTour (2005–2006)
- Type: One-day
- Web site: www.zueri-metzgete.ch

History
- First edition: 1914
- Editions: 91
- Final edition: 2006
- First winner: Henri Rheinwald (SUI)
- Most wins: Heiri Suter (SUI) (6 wins)
- Final winner: Samuel Sánchez (ESP)

Züri-Metzgete (Zürich German; English: Championship of Zürich; German: Meisterschaft von Zürich) was a European Classic cycle race held annually in Zürich, Switzerland, and continued as a non-professional mass participation event from 2007 until 2014. It was a race with a long history dating back to 1914, on a demanding course in the hilly region around Zürich. In its heyday the race was considered the sixth monument of cycling, alongside the five most prestigious one-day races on the calendar (Milan–San Remo, Tour of Flanders, Paris–Roubaix, Liège–Bastogne–Liège and the Tour of Lombardy). It was the most prominent of the summer classics.

The Züri-Metzgete was included in every edition of the former UCI Road World Cup which ran from 1989 to 2004, and a leg of the inaugural UCI ProTour in 2005. In 2005 the race was moved to the end of the season for the first time in its history. The 2007 edition of the race was canceled after organizers failed to attract enough sponsors in the wake of several doping scandals in international cycling. In 2008, the race was held on September 7, but the format has been changed to an amateur competition.

== History and background ==
The Züri-Metzgete was first held in 1914 and has been held annually since 1917, including the second World War years, giving it the longest continued existence of any of cycling's major races. Originally, the race was billed as "Meisterschaft von Zürich" (Championship of Zurich), and this designation is still being used in some places. However, the colloquial expression "Züri Metzgete" soon became popular and has long been adapted by the organisers themselves and also by the UCI. "Züri" is Swiss dialect for Zurich. "Metzgete" (from "metzgern", to butcher) is a dialect word as well and a tongue-in-cheek reference to the supposedly ruthless character of the race. (Originally, a "Metzgete" is a special form of agricultural festivity usually held in autumn when farmers had to reduce their livestock to get through the winter. The fresh meat was then sold and distributed in barbecue-like village festivals.)

For many years the event was held in early May, not an ideal date as the majority of the top classic riders were jaded after contesting the "Monuments" in March and April. Also during the 1960s, 1970s and 1980s the race was often held the day after the Rund um den Henninger Turm in Frankfurt and this affected the quality of the field and the racing. In 1988 the race was switched to a date in mid August which attracted many of the Tour de France stars and gave the race a new lease of life. The 2005 edition of the race has been switched to yet another new date in early October, as the UCI rearranged the cycling calendar to bring the World Championships a few weeks earlier in the season.

In the early days, the Züri-Metzgete was dominated by home riders with the race being won on 34 occasions by the Swiss in the first 41 editions of the race between 1914 and 1956. The most notable foreign winner in this period was Gino Bartali. In 1946, the Italian beat arch rival Fausto Coppi in a contentious race, the two Italians rode together at a breakneck pace shaking off all their rivals with Bartali winning in controversial circumstances, sprinting away while Coppi was tightening his toe straps. Many people say this incident was the start of the "war" between Bartali and Coppi. That 1946 race was won at an average speed of 42.228 km/h (26.239 mph), a record speed which stood for over 50 years. Spaniard Juan Antonio Flecha won the 2004 edition of the race in a record average speed of 42.707 km/h (26.537 mph).

Many of the Swiss winners at this time never went on to win another major race but two of Switzerland's greatest riders Ferdinand Kübler (1943) and Hugo Koblet (1952 and 1954) were triumphant at Zürich in this era, another Swiss Henri Suter set the record for the most victories at six between 1919 and 1929. After 1956 the race winners have become more international with only five Swiss winners in this period compared to 15 victories for Italy and 13 for Belgium. The quality of the race winners has been very high with classic specialists such as Paolo Bettini, Francesco Moser, Roger De Vlaeminck, Freddy Maertens, Giuseppe Saronni and Johan Museeuw all winning while the switch to an August date in 1988 allowed Tour de France riders such as Lance Armstrong, Jan Ullrich and Laurent Dufaux to do well in the race.

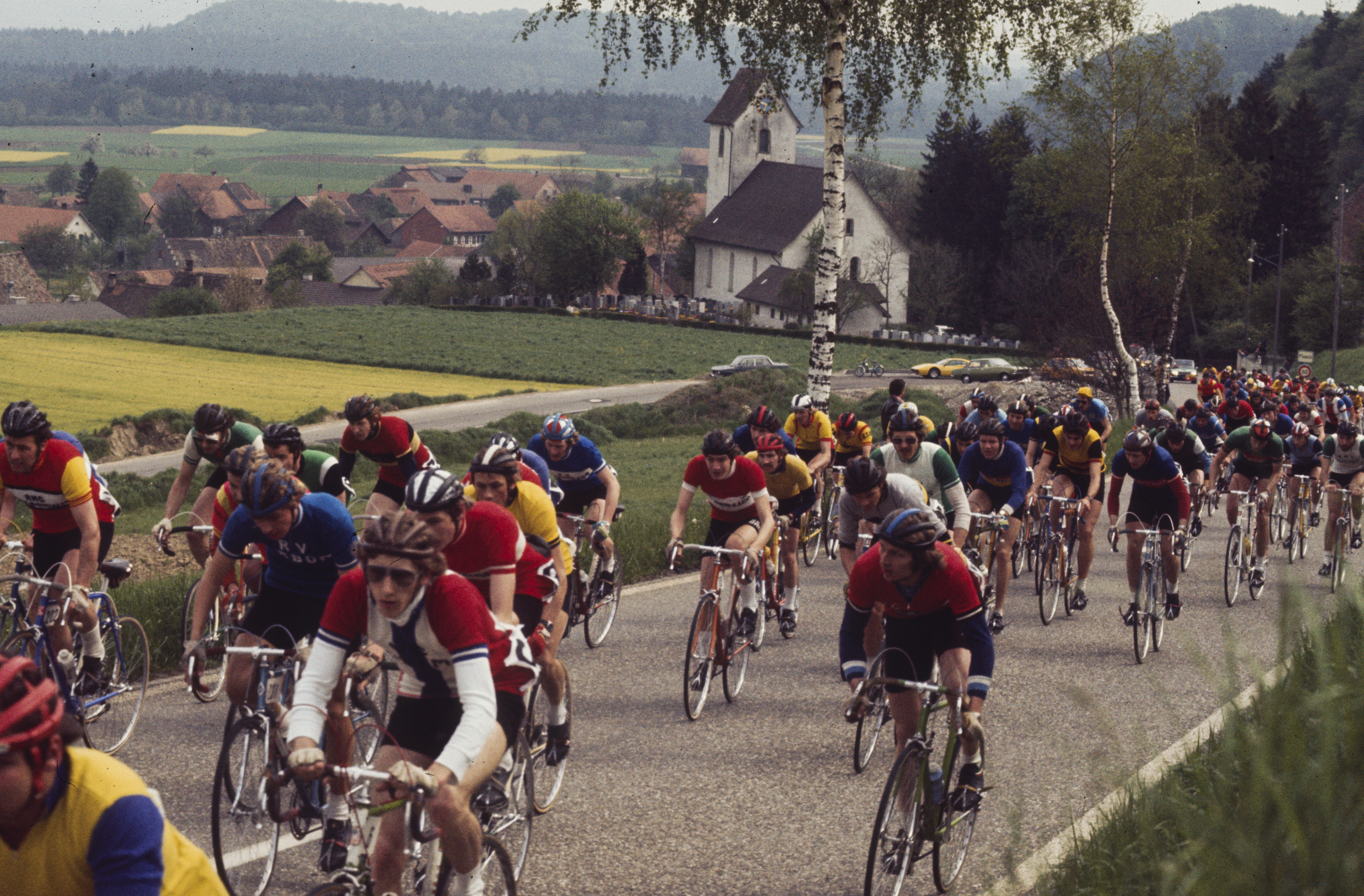
1977 edition: the peloton passing through Berg am Irchel

== The route ==
The present day race starts and finishes in Zürich, in previous years the finish was on the Oerlikon velodrome in Zürich but that was abandoned a number of years ago. The race is held over a distance of 241 km with over 3000 metres of climbing, consisting of one 72.5 km lap and four 42.1 km circuits, this shorter lap includes four ascents of both the Pfannenstiel and Forch climbs, the final climb of the Pfannenstiel is just 15 km from the finish in Zürich and is often the launching point for the winning move in the race. Between 1993 and 1999 the race started in Basel and finished in Zürich and was known as the Grand Prix Suisse.

== Winners ==
=== List of winners ===
Year	Country	Rider	Team
1914	Switzerland	Henri Rheinwald	
1917	Switzerland	Charles Martinet	
1918	Switzerland	Anton Sieger	
1919	Switzerland	Heiri Suter	
1920	Switzerland	Heiri Suter	
1921	Italy	Ricardo Maffeo	
1922	Switzerland	Heiri Suter	
1923	Germany	Adolf Huschke	
1924	Switzerland	Heiri Suter	
1925	Switzerland	Hans Kaspar	
1926	Switzerland	Albert Blattmann	
1927	Switzerland	Kastor Notter	
1928	Switzerland	Heiri Suter	
1929	Switzerland	Heiri Suter	
1930	Belgium	Omer Taverne	
1931	Austria	Max Bulla	
1932	Switzerland	Auguste Erne	
1933	Switzerland	Walter Blattmann	
1934	Switzerland	Paul Egli	
1935	Switzerland	Paul Egli	
1936	Switzerland	Werner Buchwalder	
1937	Switzerland	Leo Amberg	
1938	Switzerland	Hans Martin	
1939	Switzerland	Karl Litschi	
1940	Switzerland	Robert Zimmermann	
1941	Switzerland	Walter Diggelmann	
1942	Switzerland	Paul Egli	
1943	Switzerland	Ferdinand Kübler	
1944	Switzerland	Ernst Naef	
1945	Switzerland	Léo Weilenmann	
1946	Italy	Gino Bartali	
1947	Switzerland	Charles Guyot	
1948	Italy	Gino Bartali	
1949	Switzerland	Fritz Schaer	
1950	Switzerland	Fritz Schaer	
1951	Switzerland	Jean Brun	
1952	Switzerland	Hugo Koblet	
1953	Switzerland	Eugène Kamber	
1954	Switzerland	Hugo Koblet	
1955	Switzerland	Max Schellenberg	
1956	Switzerland	Carlo Clerici	
1957	West Germany	Hans Junkermann	
1958	Italy	Giuseppe Cainero	
1959	Italy	Angelo Conterno	
1960	Switzerland	Alfred Ruegg	
1961	Switzerland	Rolf Maurer	
1962	Netherlands	Jan Janssen	
1963	Italy	Franco Balmamion	
1964	Belgium	Guido Reybrouck	
1965	Italy	Franco Bitossi	
1966	Italy	Italo Zilioli	
1967	Switzerland	Robert Hagmann	
1968	Italy	Franco Bitossi	
1969	Belgium	Roger Swerts	
1970	Belgium	Walter Godefroot	
1971	Belgium	Herman Van Springel	
1972	Belgium	Willy Van Neste	
1973	Belgium	André Dierickx	
1974	Belgium	Walter Godefroot	
1975	Belgium	Roger De Vlaeminck	
1976	Belgium	Freddy Maertens	
1977	Italy	Francesco Moser	
1978	West Germany	Dietrich Thurau	
1979	Italy	Giuseppe Saronni	
1980	Belgium	Gerry Verlinden	
1981	Switzerland	Beat Breu	
1982	Netherlands	Adri van der Poel	
1983	Netherlands	Johan van der Velde	
1984	Australia	Phil Anderson	
1985	Belgium	Ludo Peeters	
1986	Portugal	Acácio da Silva Mura	
1987	West Germany	Rolf Gölz	
1988	Netherlands	Steven Rooks	
1989	Canada	Steve Bauer	
1990	France	Charly Mottet	
1991	Belgium	Johan Museeuw	
1992	Russia	Viatcheslav Ekimov	
1993	Italy	Maurizio Fondriest	
1994	Italy	Gianluca Bortolami	
1995	Belgium	Johan Museeuw	
1996	Italy	Andrea Ferrigato	
1997	Italy	Davide Rebellin	
1998	Italy	Michele Bartoli	
1999	Poland	Grzegorz Gwiazdowski	
2000	Switzerland	Laurent Dufaux	
2001	Italy	Paolo Bettini	
2002	Italy	Dario Frigo	
2003	Italy	Daniele Nardello	
2004	Spain	Juan Antonio Flecha	
2005	Italy	Paolo Bettini	
2006	Spain	Samuel Sánchez	

=== Multiple winners ===
Wins	Rider	Nationality	Editions
6	Heiri Suter	Switzerland	1919, 1920, 1922, 1924, 1928, 1929
3	Paul Egli	Switzerland	1934, 1935, 1942
2	Gino Bartali	Italy	1946, 1948
2	Fritz Schär	Switzerland	1949, 1950
2	Hugo Koblet	Switzerland	1952, 1954
2	Franco Bitossi	Italy	1965, 1968
2	Walter Godefroot	Belgium	1970, 1974
2	Johan Museeuw	Belgium	1991, 1995
2	Paolo Bettini	Italy	2001, 2005

=== Wins per country ===
Wins	Country
40	Switzerland
20	Italy
14	Belgium
4	Germany/West Germany; Netherlands
2	Spain
1	Australia; Austria; Canada; France; Poland; Portugal; Russia
