= Rudy Dhaenens =

Belgian cyclist

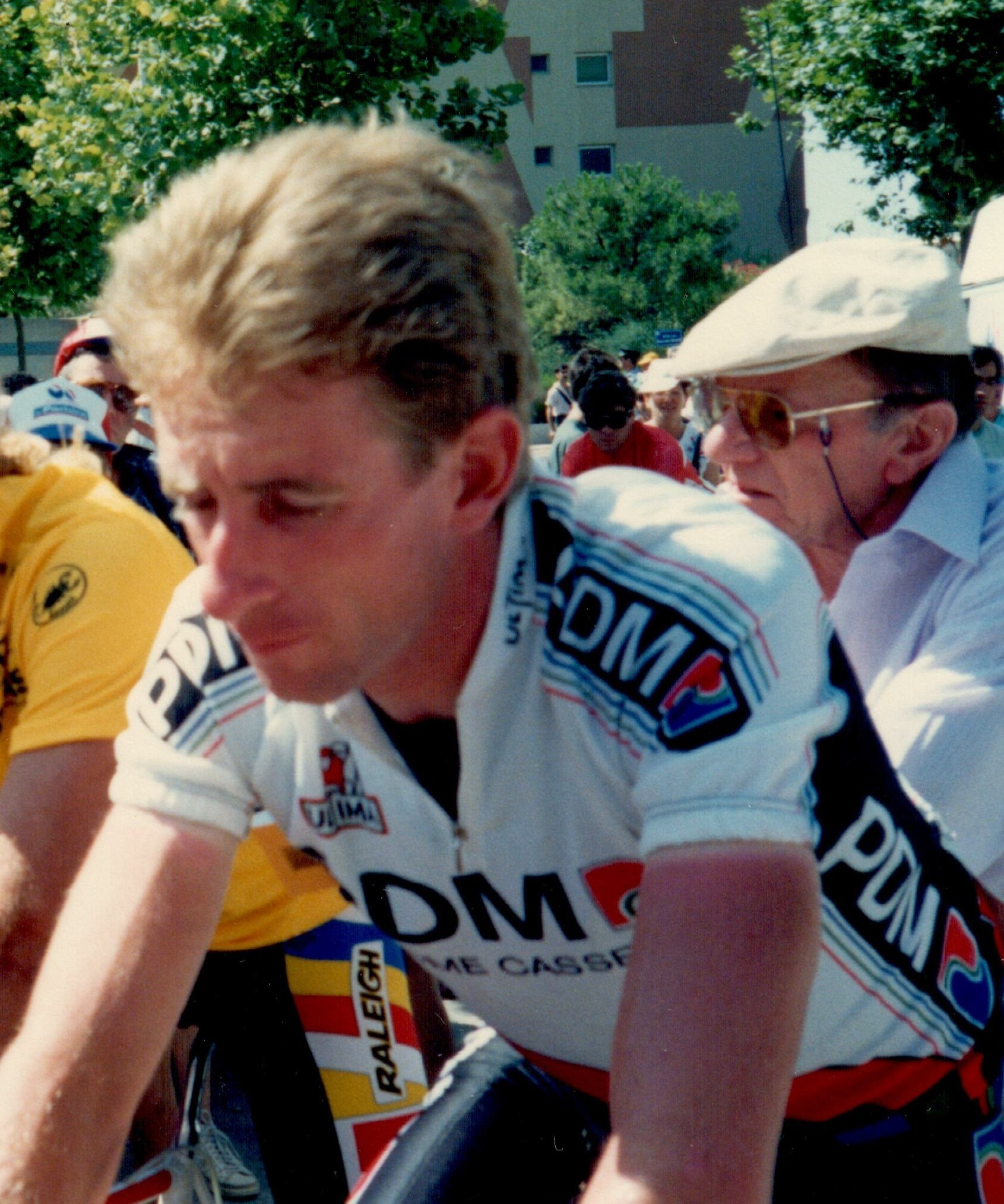
- Dhaenens at the 1989 Tour de France

Personal information
- Full name: Rudy Dhaenens
- Born: 10 April 1961 Deinze, Belgium
- Died: 6 April 1998 (aged 36) Aalst, Belgium

Cycling career
- Sport: Cycling
- Discipline: Road
- Role: Rider

Professional teams
- 1983–1987: Splendor–Euro Shop
- 1988–1990: PDM–Ultima–Concorde
- 1991–1992: Panasonic–Sportlife

Major wins
- Grand Tours Tour de France 1 individual stage (1986) One-day races and Classics World Road Race Championships (1990)
Medal record
Representing Belgium
Men's road bicycle racing
World Championships
| Gold medal – first place | 1990 Utsunomiya | Road race |

Rudy Dhaenens (10 April 1961 – 6 April 1998) was a Belgian professional road bicycle racer who is most famous for winning the road race at the 1990 UCI Road World Championships as a member of the Belgian national team.

Dhaenens excelled several times in the Paris–Roubaix classic race; finishing second in 1986 and third the following year. Dhaenens won the 1990 World Championship Road Race, held in Utsunomiya, Japan, ahead of Dirk De Wolf of Belgium and Gianni Bugno of Italy. In 1992, Dhaenens was forced to stop his career because of heart problems. For a long time, he was in the service of the PDM cycling team, usually as tactical captain. Dhaenens was known for his calm, reserved attitude.

He died in 1998, at the age of 36, from head injuries sustained in a car accident in Aalst while driving to the finish of the Tour of Flanders bicycle race. From 1999 to 2007, the Grand Prix Rudy Dhaenens was held in his honour in late March, in Nevele, Belgium.

== Major results ==
1981
2nd Ronde van Vlaanderen Beloften
1983
8th Grand Prix d'Isbergues
1984
3rd Overall Tour de Luxembourg
4th Amstel Gold Race
8th Gent–Wevelgem
10th Omloop van het Leiedal
1985
1st Druivenkoers Overijse
3rd Road race, National Road Championships
3rd Gent–Wevelgem
4th Trofeo Luis Puig
5th Paris–Roubaix
10th Overall Tour of Belgium
10th Overall Four Days of Dunkirk
10th Paris–Tours
10th De Kustpijl
1986
1st Stage 11 Tour de France
2nd Paris–Roubaix
2nd De Kustpijl
6th Overall Tour de Luxembourg

1st Stage 1

7th Gent–Wevelgem
10th Overall Four Days of Dunkirk
1987
3rd Paris–Roubaix
4th Trofeo Laigueglia
6th Gent–Wevelgem
1988
4th Omloop Het Volk
8th Tour of Flanders
8th Gent–Wevelgem
1989
5th Grand Prix de la Libération (TTT)
7th Milan–San Remo
9th Overall Tirreno–Adriatico
10th Overall Ronde van Nederland
10th GP du canton d'Argovie
1990
1st Road race, UCI Road World Championships
1st Stage 2a Vuelta a Asturias
2nd Tour of Flanders
2nd Druivenkoers Overijse
3rd Wincanton Classic
4th Liège–Bastogne–Liège
5th Tre Valli Varesine
8th GP des Amériques
9th Paris–Roubaix
10th Gent–Wevelgem
1991
3rd Grand Prix Criquielion
3rd Grand Prix de la Libération (TTT)
10th Road race, National Road Championships

=== Grand Tours general classification results timeline ===
| Grand Tour | 1983 | 1984 | 1985 | 1986 | 1987 | 1988 | 1989 | 1990 | 1991 | 1992 |
|---|---|---|---|---|---|---|---|---|---|---|
| Vuelta a España | Did not contest during career | | | | | | | | | |
| Giro d'Italia | — | — | — | — | — | DNF | — | — | — | — |
| Tour de France | DNF | DNF | 101 | 122 | DNF | 87 | DNF | 43 | DNF | — |

Legend
| — | Did not compete |
| DNF | Did not finish |
