= Charly Mottet =

French cyclist (born 1962)

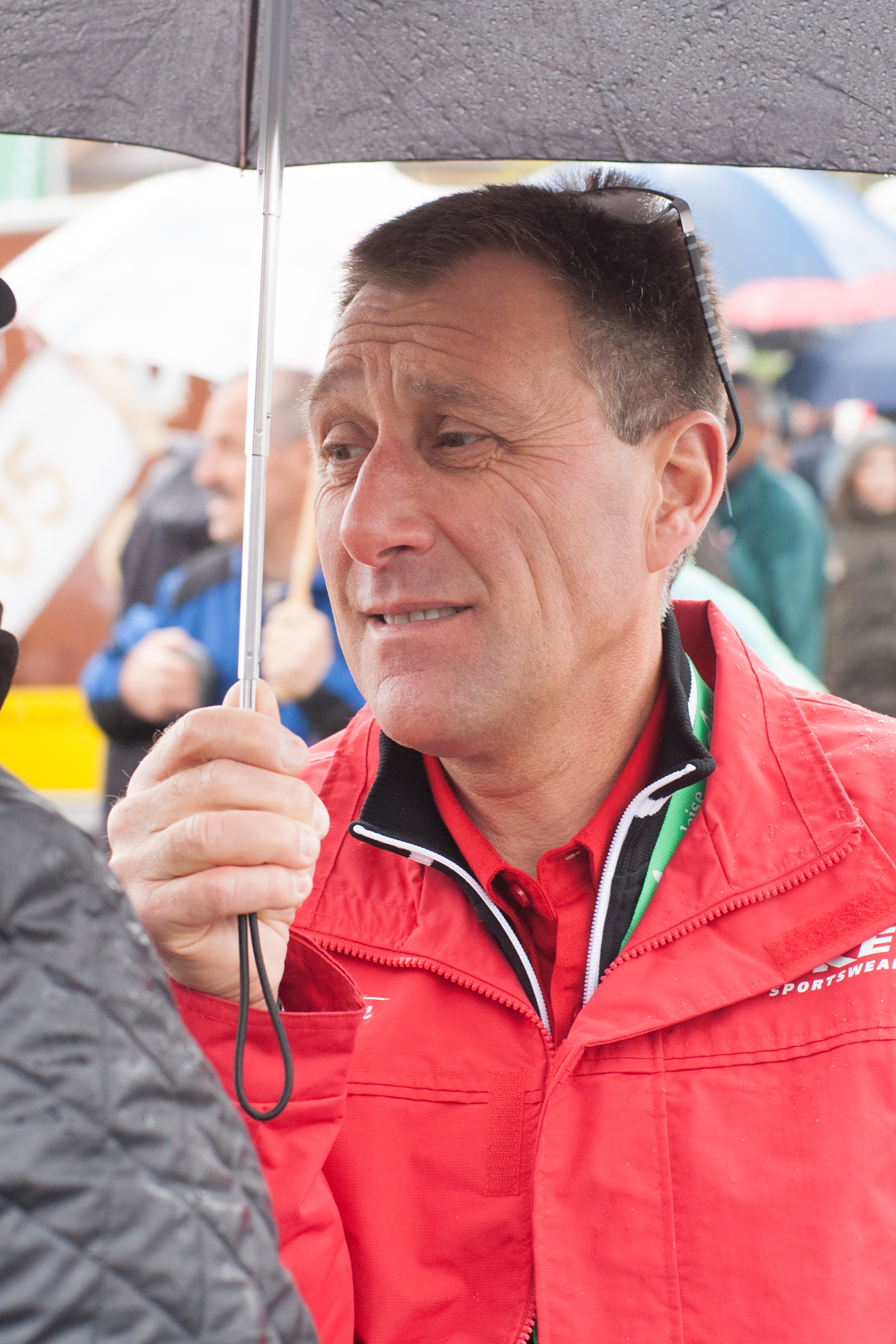
- Mottet at the 2013 Tour de Romandie

Personal information
- Full name: Charly Mottet
- Nickname: Petit Charly
- Born: 16 December 1962 (age 63) Valence, Drôme, France

Cycling career
- Sport: Cycling
- Current team: Retired
- Discipline: Road
- Role: Rider
- Rider type: All-rounder

Professional teams
- 1983–1985: Renault–Elf
- 1986–1988: Système U
- 1989–1992: RMO
- 1993–1994: Novemail–Histor–Laser Computer

Major wins
- Grand Tours Tour de France 3 individual stages (1990. 1991) Giro d'Italia Young rider classification (1984) 1 individual stage (1990) Vuelta a España 2 individual stages (1986) Stage races Critérium du Dauphiné Libéré (1987, 1989, 1992) Tour de Romandie (1990) One-day races and Classics Giro di Lombardia (1988) Züri-Metzgete (1990)
Medal record
Representing France
Men's road bicycle racing
World Championships
Silver medal – second place	1986 Colorado Springs	Elite Men's Road Race

Charly Mottet (born 16 December 1962 in Valence, Drôme) is a French former professional cyclist (1983 to 1994). He was one of the best French road cyclists of his era.

== Career ==
Mottet won a total of 67 races, including the Tour de Romandie in 1990, and rode eight times in the Tour de France. His best results in the Tour de France were 4th-place finishes in 1987 and 1991. He won three stages, one in 1990 (Stage 15 : Millau – Revel) and two in 1991 (Stage 11 : Quimper – Saint-Herblain and Stage 12 : Pau – Jaca). He also finished 2nd in the 1990 Giro d'Italia.

During his professional cycling career, Mottet had a reputation within the peloton as being a totally clean rider who never used performance-enhancing drugs. He is former FICP World No. 1 (in May and August 1989).

After retiring from racing, Mottet became involved in race organising, working on the Critérium du Dauphiné (where he was assistant director) for 14 years, before being appointed sports manager of the Grand Prix Cycliste de Québec and Grand Prix Cycliste de Montréal in 2010. He also served as selector for the French national cycling team at the 1997 and 1998 Road World Championships, and as a technical delegate for the Union Cycliste Internationale (UCI) at the 2004 and 2008 Olympics.

== Family ==
Charly Mottet's daughter, Eva Mottet, was also a road racing cyclist. She competed in women's junior events at the 2012 World Championships, finishing sixth in the time trial before a serious crash in the road race. Charly Mottet was a UCI official at the race. Eva never fully recovered from her injuries and died in April 2020, aged 25.

== Career achievements ==
=== Major results ===
1982
2nd Paris–Troyes
1983
2nd Overall Tour de Luxembourg

1st Stage 1

2nd Overall Route du Sud

1st Stage 2

5th Overall Tour du Vaucluse
6th Overall Tour de l'Avenir
1984
1st Overall Tour de l'Avenir

1st Stage 7

1st Young rider classification Giro d'Italia
1st Liedekerkse Pijl
1st Stage 5 Clásico RCN
2nd Paris–Brussels
6th Grand Prix de Cannes
9th Overall Tour de Romandie
1985
1st Overall Tour du Haut Var
1st Grand Prix d'Ouverture La Marseillaise
1st Grand Prix des Nations
1st Giro del Piemonte
1st Duo Normand (with Thierry Marie)
1st Stages 9 & 11 Tour de l'Avenir
2nd Overall Paris–Bourges
3rd Firenze–Pistoia
5th Overall Critérium International
6th Overall Étoile de Bessèges

1st Stage 3

8th Overall Tour du Limousin
9th Overall Paris–Nice

1st Stage 7a

1986
1st Stages 9 & 11 Vuelta a España
1st Grand Prix Eddy Merckx
1st Breuillet
1st Stage 2 Tour du Vaucluse
2nd Road race, UCI Road World Championships
2nd Overall Route du Sud

1st Stage 1

2nd Firenze–Pistoia
3rd Overall Volta a Catalunya
3rd Paris–Tours
4th Overall Critérium International
4th Grand Prix des Nations
9th Overall Paris–Nice
10th La Flèche Wallonne
1987
1st Overall Critérium du Dauphiné Libéré
1st Six-Days of Grenoble (with Bernard Vallet)
1st Overall Tour du Limousin

1st Stage 1

1st Châteauroux–Limoges
1st Critérium des As
1st Grand Prix des Nations
1st GP de Vannes
1st Montreuil
1st Quilan
3rd Overall Four Days of Dunkirk
3rd GP Eddy Merckx
4th Overall Tour de France
4th Paris–Tours
9th Giro di Lombardia
1988
1st Giro di Lombardia
1st Overall Six-Days of Grenoble (with Roman Hermann)
1st Giro del Lazio
1st Grand Prix des Nations
1st Overall Tour du Vaucluse

1st Stage 2b

2nd Overall Four Days of Dunkirk

1st Stage 6a (ITT)

2nd GP Ouest–France
2nd Overall Paris–Bourges

1st Stage 2

2nd Overall Tour Méditerranéen
3rd Overall Critérium du Dauphiné Libéré

1st Stage 3

3rd Overall Euskal Bizikleta
3rd Trofeo Baracchi
3rd Grand Prix de Wallonie
4th La Flèche Wallonne
5th Overall Ronde van Nederland
7th Tour of Flanders
7th Liège–Bastogne–Liège
8th GP Eddy Merckx
10th Trophée des Grimpeurs
1989
1st Overall Critérium du Dauphiné Libéré

1st Stage 3

1st Overall Four Days of Dunkirk

1st Stage 3b

1st Overall Six Days of Paris (with Etienne De Wilde)
1st Boucles de l'Aulne
1st Giro del Lazio
1st Châteaulin
1st Stage 3 Tour d'Armorique
2nd Overall Tour of Ireland
2nd Overall Critérium International
2nd Tre Valli Varesine
3rd Overall Tirreno–Adriatico

1st Stage 6

3rd Overall Vuelta a la Comunidad Valenciana
3rd GP des Amériques
3rd Grand Prix des Nations
4th Clásica de San Sebastián
4th Overall Grand Prix du Midi-Libre

1st Prologue

6th Overall Tour de France
7th Trophée des Grimpeurs
10th Overall Driedaagse van De Panne-Koksijde
1990
1st Stage 15 Tour de France
1st Overall Tour de Romandie

1st Prologue & Stage 3b

1st Züri-Metzgete
2nd Overall Giro d'Italia

1st Stage 16

5th Overall Tour Méditerranéen
5th 1990 UCI Road World Cup Finale
6th Trofeo Baracchi
1991
1st Overall Four Days of Dunkirk
1st Classique des Alpes
1st Stage 2 Tour d'Armorique
2nd Coppa Ugo Agostoni
3rd Overall Critérium International

1st Stage 2

3rd Giro dell'Emilia
4th Overall Tour de France

1st Stages 11 & 12

5th Overall Vuelta a Andalucía
6th Trophée des Grimpeurs
9th Trofeo Luis Puig
10th Clásica de San Sebastián
1992
1st Overall Critérium du Dauphiné Libéré

1st Stage 8

1st Coppa Bernocchi
3rd Overall Tour de Romandie
5th Trophée des Grimpeurs
8th Overall Volta a Catalunya
10th Overall Paris–Nice
1993
1st Overall Tour du Limousin

1st Stage 4b

1st Overall Tour Méditerranéen

1st Stage 3

2nd Züri-Metzgete
3rd Overall Étoile de Bessèges
4th Grand Prix d'Ouverture La Marseillaise
5th Giro di Lombardia
1994
1st Stage 7 Paris–Nice
2nd Paris–Camembert
3rd Overall Route du Sud
5th Overall Tour Méditerranéen
5th Grand Prix des Nations
8th Overall Étoile de Bessèges

=== Grand Tour general classification results timeline ===
Grand Tour	1984	1985	1986	1987	1988	1989	1990	1991	1992	1993	1994
Vuelta a España	—	—	22	—	—	—	—	—	—	—	—
Giro d'Italia	21	—	—	—	—	—	2	—	—	—	—
Tour de France	—	36	16	4	DNF	6	49	4	DNF	40	46
