= Jean-Claude Colotti =

French cyclist

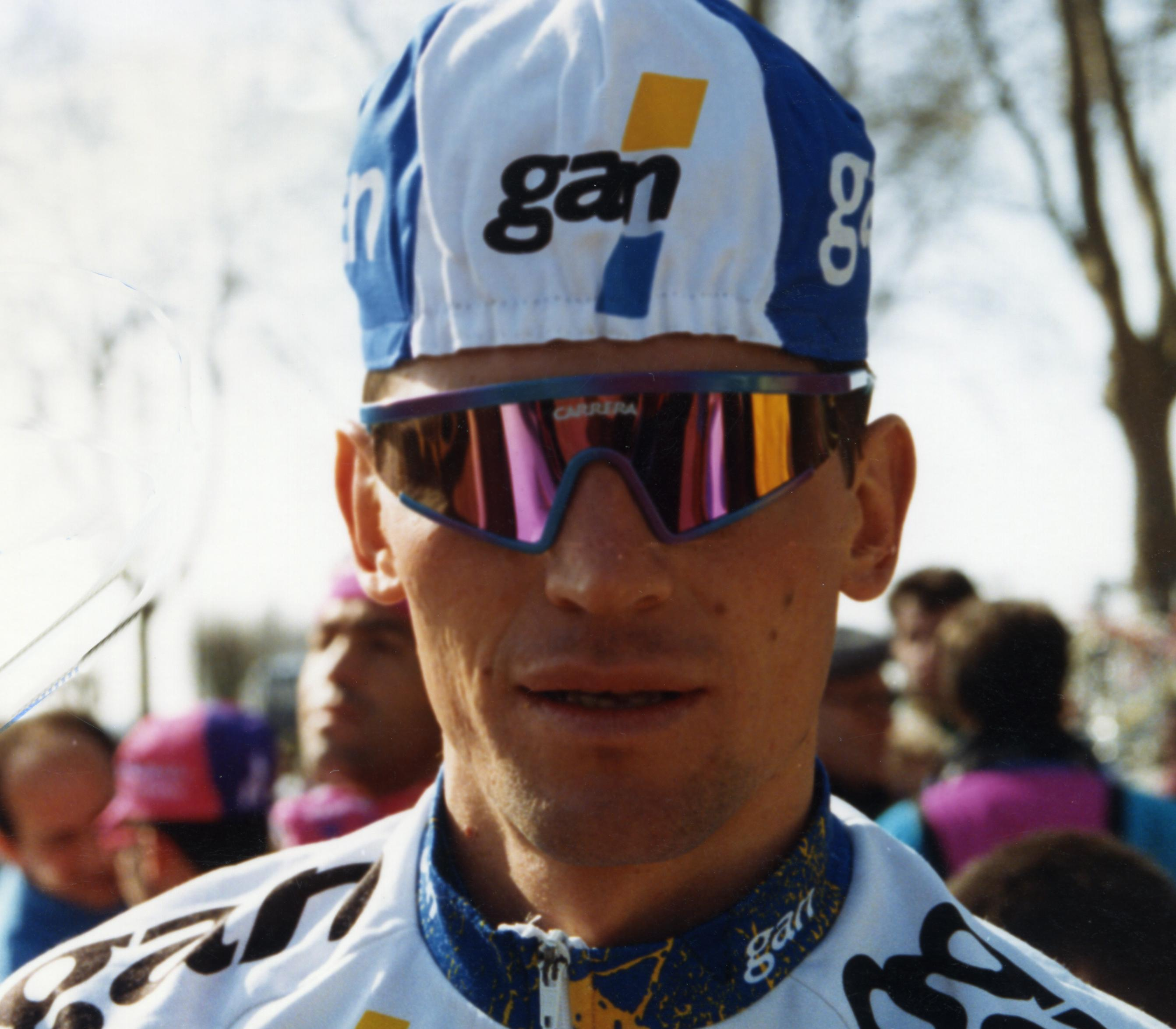
- Colotti at the 1993 Paris–Nice

Personal information
- Full name: Jean-Claude Colotti
- Born: 1 July 1961 (age 65) La Tronche, France

Cycling career
- Sport: Cycling
- Discipline: Track/Road
- Role: Rider

Major wins
- 1 stage 1992 Tour de France

Jean-Claude Colotti (born 1 July 1961) is a French former professional road bicycle racer (from 1986 to 1996). Colotti won a stage in the 1992 Tour de France. He was part of a breakaway that finished about fifteen minutes ahead of the peloton. Colotti went on a solo attack and beat 2nd place finisher Frans Maassen by more than three minutes.

== Major results ==
- 1987
  - France National Track Pursuit Championship
  - Tour de Vendée
- 1988
  - GP Saint-Etienne Loire
- 1989
  - GP Ouest-France
- 1991
  - Lisieux
- Nantes
  - Six-Days of Grenoble (with Philippe Tarantini)
- 1992
  - Dijon
- Hendaye
- Tour de France:
  - Winner stage 17
- 1994
  - Six Days of Nouméa (with Jean-Michel Pontarlier)
  - Six-Days of Grenoble (with Dean Woods)
- 1996
  - Riom
