= Steve Bauer =

Canadian cyclist

Personal information
- Full name: Steve Bauer
- Born: June 12, 1959 (age 67) St. Catharines, Ontario, Canada

Cycling career
- Sport: Cycling
- Current team: NSN Cycling Team
- Disciplines: Road & Track
- Role: Rider (retired); Sporting director

Amateur teams
- 1977–1979: SCCC
- 1980: AMF Racing
- 1981–1984: GS Mengoni

Professional teams
- 1985–1987: La Vie Claire
- 1988–1989: Weinmann–La Suisse–SMM Uster
- 1990–1995: 7-Eleven
- 1996: Saturn Cycling Team

Managerial teams
- 2008–2012: Team R.A.C.E. Pro
- 2019–2020: CCC Team
- 2021: Astana–Premier Tech
- 2022–: Israel–Premier Tech

Major wins
- Grand Tours Tour de France 1 individual stage (1988) One-day races and Classics National Road Race Championships (1981, 1982, 1983) Züri-Metzgete (1989)
Medal record
Men's road bicycle racing
Representing Canada
Olympic Games
| Silver medal – second place | 1984 Los Angeles | Individual Road Race |
Commonwealth Games
| Silver medal – second place | 1982 Brisbane | Individual Road Race |
World Championships
| Bronze medal – third place | 1984 Barcelona | Elite Men's Road Race |
| Disqualified | 1988 Ronse | Elite Men's Road Race |

Steven Todd Bauer, MSM (born June 12, 1959) is a retired professional road bicycle racer from Canada. He won the first Olympic medal in road cycling for Canada and until 2022 he was the only Canadian to win an individual stage of the Tour de France (Ryder Hesjedal, Svein Tuft and Alex Stieda had been part of winning team time trial squads).

== Cycling career ==
Bauer joined the Canadian national cycling team in 1977, competing in team pursuit. He would remain on the national team for seven years, winning the national road race championship in 1981, 1982, and 1983, competing in the Commonwealth Games (1978, 1982), the Pan American Games (1979).

He capped his amateur career with a silver medal in the men's cycling road race at the 1984 Summer Olympics in Los Angeles. This was the first medal in road cycling for Canada at the Olympics.

Bauer turned professional following the Olympics, and in his second professional race, won the bronze medal at the world cycling championship road race in Barcelona.

Between 1985 and 1995, he competed in 11 Tours de France. He began his professional career in 1985 on the La Vie Claire team of Bernard Hinault and Greg LeMond, where he stayed until leaving for Weinmann–La Suisse–SMM Uster Helvetia in 1988. Bauer finished fourth in the 1988 Tour, winning the first stage and wearing the yellow jersey for five days, the second Canadian to wear the jersey. The first was Alex Stieda in 1986, who was also the first North American to wear the yellow jersey.

At the 1988 world championship, Bauer disputed the final sprint with Belgium's Claude Criquielion, world champion in 1984, and Italy's Maurizio Fondriest. As Criquielion tried to pass against the barriers, Bauer sent him crashing into the barriers. Meanwhile, Fondriest passed and won the race. Bauer was immediately disqualified, even if once Criquielion sued Bauer for assault and battery, the municipal court of Oudenaarde ruled in Bauer's favour. The ruling was upheld in both the Appeal Court and the Supreme court, at which stage Criquielion was fined for bringing the case a third time in a process that lasted for more than five years.

In 1989 Bauer won the Züri-Metzgete. In 1990, he took second place in Paris–Roubaix to Belgian Eddy Planckaert. The finish was so close that the officials had to study the photo-finish for more than ten minutes before Planckaert was finally declared the winner. After 266 kilometers of racing, Planckaert had just edged Bauer by less than a centimeter, making it the closest finish of the race's history.

Riding for 7-Eleven, Bauer wore the Yellow Jersey following stages one to nine at the 1990 Tour de France, before ultimately finishing 27th. He had been part of a stage one breakaway alongside Claudio Chiappucci, Ronan Pensec and Frans Maassen which gained a 10-minute time advantage at the head of the general standings. In subsequent stages, Bauer, Pensec and Chiappucci all wore yellow with defending champion Greg LeMond only gaining the lead of the race after stage 20, the final time trial. At the 1991 Paris-Roubaix, Bauer placed fourth overall, finishing in a small group just over a minute behind lone winner Marc Madiot. For his 1993 Paris–Roubaix campaign, he had a bike built by the Merckx factory with "an extreme rearward seat position" to test his theory that it would "engag[e] the quadriceps more efficiently" and with it "more power to the pedals". He failed to make the top ten (finishing over 4 minutes behind the winner in 23rd place) and never rode that bike again.

In 1994, he was awarded the Meritorious Service Medal (civil division) for having "paved the way for Canada's coming generations of cycling enthusiasts".

In 1996, with professionals allowed in the Olympics, Bauer became a member of the Canadian team for the 1996 Summer Olympics, finishing 41st in the road race. He announced his retirement later that year at 37. The following year, he co-founded Steve Bauer Bike Tours.

In 2005 Steve was inducted to the Canadian Olympic Hall of Fame and the Canadian Sport Hall of Fame. Bauer also participated in the Red Bull Road Rage held on Tuna Canyon, Malibu, California.

In 2013, Bauer raced in the Canadian Cycling Championships in the Men's 50–59 road race and finished fourth.

In 2015, Bauer raced in the Canadian Track Championships in the Men's 50–59 and finished 1st in the Scratch race, 1st in the Individual Pursuit and 2nd in the Points Race.

=== Team management ===
In September 2007, Bauer co-founded Cycle Sport Management which developed and owned a UCI Continental men road cycling team from 2008 to 2010 and a UCI Pro Continental men road cycling team in 2011 and 2012.

Bauer was the co-owner and head directeur sportif of the team, which raced under a UCI Continental licence as Team R.A.C.E. Pro in 2008, Planet Energy in 2009 and SpiderTech–Planet Energy in 2010, before it stepped up to UCI Professional Continental status for 2011 and 2012 under the name SpiderTech–C10.

In 2021 he joined Israel–Premier Tech as a sporting director.

== Career achievements ==
=== Major results ===
1981
1st Road race, National Road Championships
1st Points race, National Track Championships
Coors Classic

1st Stages 9 & 11

1982
1st Road race, National Road Championships
1st Points race, National Track Championships
2nd Road race, Commonwealth Games
1983
1st Road race, National Road Championships
5th Gran Premio della Liberazione
1984
2nd Road race, Olympic Games
3rd Road race, UCI Road World Championships
3rd Gran Premio della Liberazione
1985
1st Grand Prix d'Aix-en-Provence
Coors Classic

1st Stages 2, 11 & 16

1st Stage 2a Route du Sud
3rd Overall Tour du Haut Var
3rd Züri-Metzgete
4th Tour Méditerranéen
8th Rund um den Henninger Turm
9th Milan–San Remo
10th Overall Tour de France

1st Stage 3 (TTT)
Held after Prologue–Stage 16

1986
2nd Overall Nissan Classic

1st Stage 2

2nd Züri-Metzgete
2nd Rund um den Henninger Turm
4th Tour of Flanders
5th Gent–Wevelgem
1987
1st Stage 1 Critérium International
3rd Overall Tour de Picardie
4th Tour of Flanders
6th Overall Vuelta a Andalucía
8th Overall Three Days of De Panne
10th Overall Giro d'Italia
10th Züri-Metzgete
1988
1st Overall Tour de Picardie
1st Grand Prix des Amériques
1st Trofeo Pantalica
1st Stage 1b Critérium du Dauphiné Libéré
2nd Overall Tour de Suisse

1st Stage 8

3rd Giro del Lazio
4th Overall Tour de France

1st Stage 1
Held after Stages 1 & 8–11
Held after Stages 1–2

4th Overall Étoile de Bessèges

1st Stage 1

6th Amstel Gold Race
6th Gent–Wevelgem
8th Paris–Roubaix
1989
1st Züri-Metzgete
1st Prologue Critérium du Dauphiné Libéré
3rd Amstel Gold Race
4th Overall Tour de Suisse
5th UCI Road World Cup
7th Omloop Het Volk
10th Tour of Flanders
1990
2nd Paris–Roubaix
5th Grand Prix des Amériques
7th UCI Road World Cup
8th Overall Nissan Classic
9th Gent–Wevelgem
Tour de France

Held after Stages 1–9

1991
Tour DuPont

Stage 7 & 10

4th Paris–Roubaix
1992
1st Stage 2 Volta a Galicia
1994
1st Stage 3 Tour DuPont
6th Paris–Tours
8th E3 Prijs Vlaanderen
1996
Rheinland-Pfalz Rundfahrt

1st Stage 9 & 10

Niedersachsen Rundfahrt

1st Stages 1b & 6

=== Grand Tour general classification results timeline ===
| Grand Tour | 1985 | 1986 | 1987 | 1988 | 1989 | 1990 | 1991 | 1992 | 1993 | 1994 | 1995 |
|---|---|---|---|---|---|---|---|---|---|---|---|
| Giro d'Italia | — | 45 | 10 | — | — | — | — | 92 | 89 | — | — |
| Tour de France | 10 | 23 | 74 | 4 | 15 | 27 | 97 | DNF | 101 | DNF | 101 |
| Vuelta a España | — | — | — | — | — | — | — | — | — | — | — |

Legend
| — | Did not compete |
| DNF | Did not finish |
