= Grand Prix des Amériques (cycling race) =

Bicycle road race held in Canada

Race details
- Region: Canada
- English name: Grand Prix of America
- Local name: Grand Prix des Amériques (in French)
- Discipline: Road race
- Competition: UCI Road World Cup
- Type: Single-day

History
- First edition: 1988
- Editions: 5
- Final edition: 1992
- First winner: Steve Bauer (CAN)
- Final winner: Federico Echave (ESP)

Grand Prix des Amériques was a classic one-day cycling race that took place in Montreal as part of the UCI Road World Cup. It was held between 1988 and 1992. In 1992, the race was named Grand Prix Téléglobe, after the name of the telecommunication company that sponsored that edition.

The race used a hilly circuit around Mount Royal, similar to that used at the 1974 UCI Road World Championships and the 1976 Summer Olympics.

== Winners ==
Year	Country	Rider	Team
1988	Canada	Steve Bauer	Weinmann–La Suisse–SMM Uster
1989	Switzerland	Jörg Müller	PDM–Ultima–Concorde
1990	Italy	Franco Ballerini	Del Tongo
1991	Belgium	Eric van Lancker	Panasonic–Sportlife
1992	Spain	Federico Echave	CLAS–Cajastur
