= Weinmann (cycling team) =

Team information
- Registered: Belgium
- Founded: 1989
- Disbanded: 1991
- Discipline: Road
- Bicycles: Eddy Merckx Cycles

Key personnel
- General manager: Jules De Wever; Walter Godefroot; Patrick Lefevere

Team name history
- 1989 1990 1 January – 1 May 1991 31 May – 31 December 1991: Domex–Weinmann; Weinmann–SMM–Uster; Weinmann–EVS; Weinmann–Eddy Merckx
Weinmann jersey
Jersey

Weinmann was a Belgian professional cycling team that existed from 1989 to 1991. Its main sponsor was the Swiss bicycle parts manufacturer Weinmann.
