= Panasonic (cycling team) =

Professional cycling team in the Netherlands

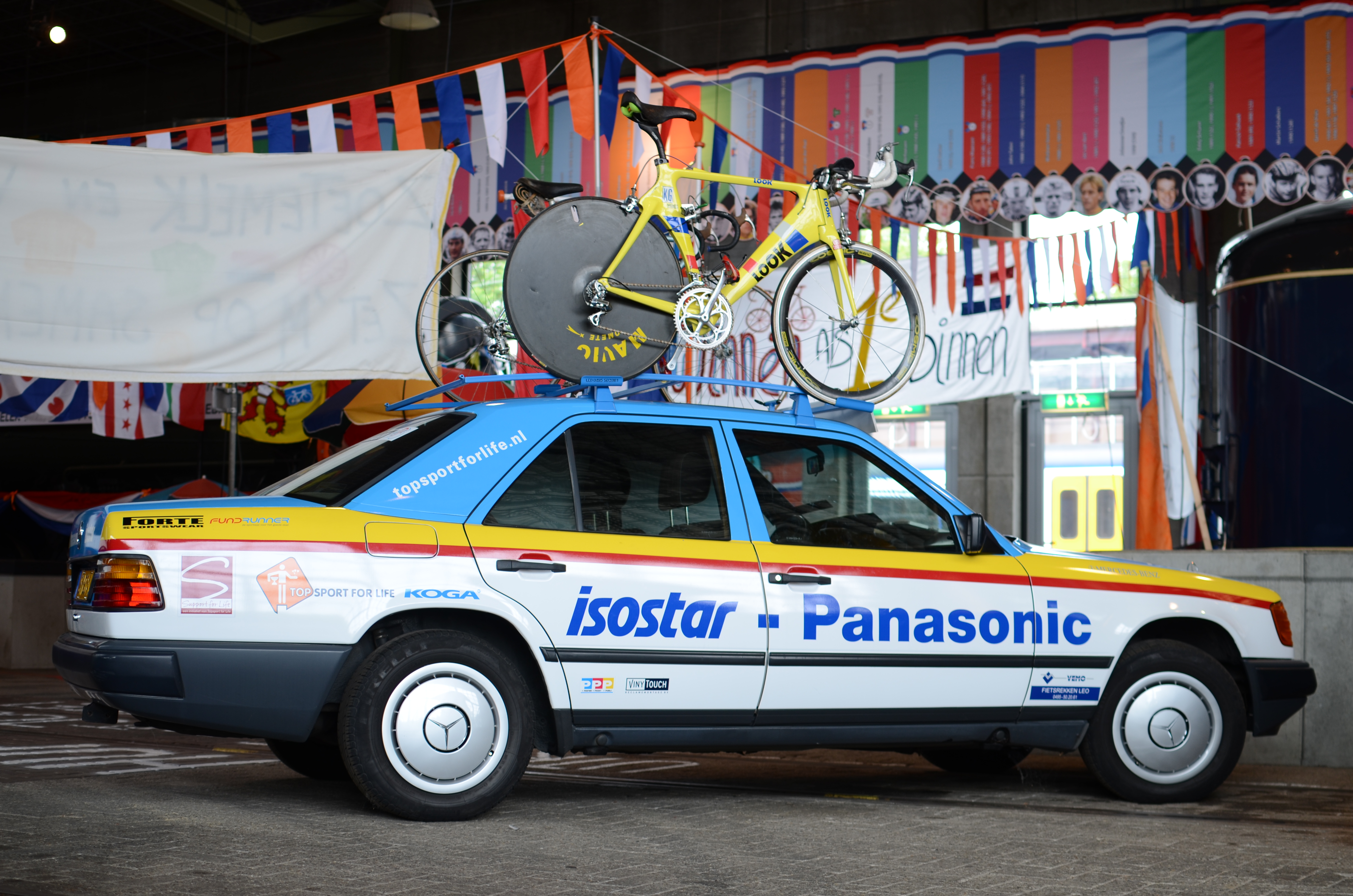
- Panasonic–Isostar team car

Team information
- Registered: Netherlands
- Founded: 1984
- Disbanded: 1992
- Discipline: Road

Key personnel
- General manager: Peter Post

Team name history
- 1984–May 1987 May 1987–1989 1990–1992: Panasonic; Panasonic–Isostar; Panasonic–Sportlife
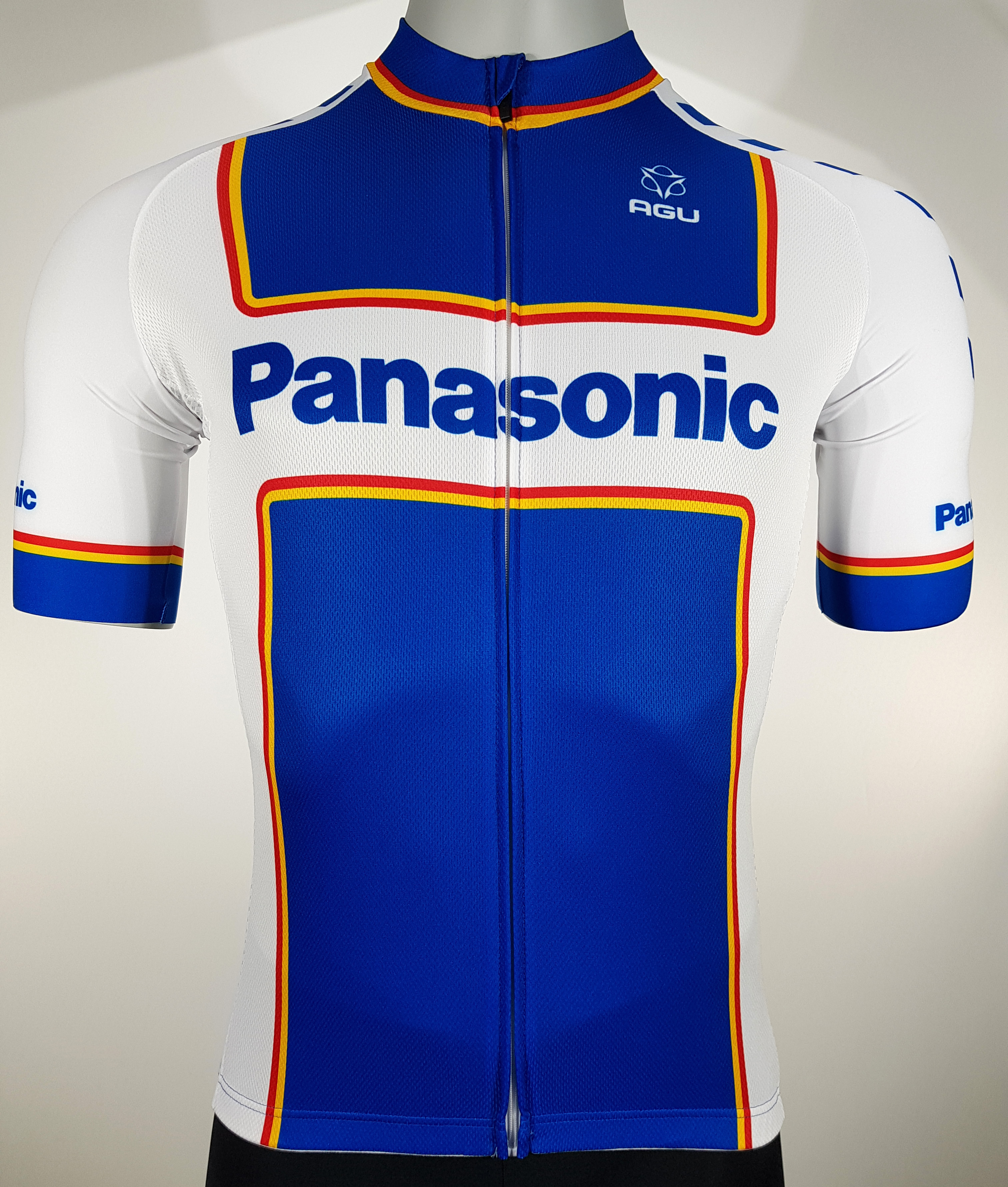
Panasonic jersey
Jersey

Panasonic was a Dutch professional cycling team, sponsored by the Matsushita Corporation, formed in 1984 by team manager Peter Post, when the TI–Raleigh main sponsors, withdrew sponsorship. Some of the riders, followed Jan Raas to his newly formed team, Kwantum Hallen–Decosol. Peter Post retained some riders, and rebuilt his team, with riders, who became one of the most dominant teams, for both classics, and stage races.

The Panasonic team, had a reputation for having vehicles from Mercedes-Benz, team clothing by Descente 1984-87 / AGU 1988-89 & Biemme 1990–92, team bicycles from Raleigh 1984–85 / Eddy Merckx 1986–87 & Colnago 1988–89, were always fitted with Italian Campagnolo groupsets.

Between 1990 and 1992 the team used Panasonic branded bicycles, fitted with Japanese Shimano equipment, reflecting its corporate branding.

== Team riders ==
1984	1985	1986	1987	1988	1989	1990	1991	1992
Henk Lubberding	Henk Lubberding	Henk Lubberding	Henk Lubberding	Henk Lubberding	Henk Lubberding	Henk Lubberding	Henk Lubberding	Henk Lubberding
Guy Nulens	Guy Nulens	Guy Nulens	Guy Nulens	Guy Nulens	Guy Nulens	Guy Nulens	Guy Nulens	Guy Nulens
Eddy Planckaert	Eddy Planckaert	Eddy Planckaert	Eddy Planckaert	Danny Clark	Danny Clark	Eddy Planckaert	Eddy Planckaert	Wilfried Nelissen
Theo de Rooij	Theo de Rooij	Theo de Rooij	Theo de Rooij	Theo de Rooij	Theo de Rooij	Theo de Rooij	Rudy Dhaenens	Rudy Dhaenens
Eric Vanderaerden	Eric Vanderaerden	Eric Vanderaerden	Eric Vanderaerden	Eric Vanderaerden	Eric Vanderaerden	Viatcheslav Ekimov	Viatcheslav Ekimov	Viatcheslav Ekimov
Peter Winnen	Peter Winnen	Peter Winnen	Peter Winnen	Peter Winnen	Peter Winnen	Eddy Bouwmans	Eddy Bouwmans	Eddy Bouwmans
Ludo De Keulenaer	Ludo De Keulenaer	Ludo De Keulenaer	Ludo De Keulenaer	Louis de Koning	Louis de Koning	Louis de Koning	Louis de Koning	Louis de Koning
Bert Oosterbosch	Bert Oosterbosch	Bert Oosterbosch	Bert Oosterbosch	Urs Freuler	Urs Freuler	Urs Freuler	Urs Freuler	
Phil Anderson	Phil Anderson	Phil Anderson	Phil Anderson	Jean-Marie Wampers	Jean-Marie Wampers	Jean-Marie Wampers	Jean-Marie Wampers	
Gert-Jan Theunisse	Gert-Jan Theunisse	Gert-Jan Theunisse	Anjo van Loon	Anjo van Loon	Anjo van Loon	Gert-Jan Theunisse	Maurizio Fondriest	Maurizio Fondriest
Jos Lammertink	Jos Lammertink	Jos Lammertink	John Talen	John Talen	John Talen	John Talen	Jacques Hanegraaf	Jacques Hanegraaf
Gerard Veldscholten	Gerard Veldscholten	Allan Peiper	Allan Peiper	Allan Peiper	Allan Peiper	Allan Peiper	Jo Planckaert	Jo Planckaert
Walter Planckaert	Walter Planckaert	Teun van Vliet	Teun van Vliet	Teun van Vliet	Teun van Vliet	Teun van Vliet	Robert Van De Vin	Robert Van De Vin
Johan Lammerts	Johan Lammerts	Eric Van Lancker	Eric Van Lancker	Eric Van Lancker	Eric Van Lancker	Eric Van Lancker	Eric Van Lancker	Eric Van Lancker
Steven Rooks	Steven Rooks	Erik Breukink	Erik Breukink	Erik Breukink	Erik Breukink	Steven Rooks	Marc van Orsouw	Marc van Orsouw
Bert Wekema	Bert Wekema	Peter Harings	Peter Harings	Peter Harings	Peter Harings	Marc Sergeant	Marc Sergeant	Marc Sergeant
René Kos	René Kos	Robert Millar	Robert Millar	Corné Van Rijen	Corné Van Rijen	Corné Van Rijen	Dimitri Zhdanov	Dimitri Zhdanov
	Henk Baars	Henk Baars	Dietrich Thurau	Dietrich Thurau	Harry Rozendal	Harry Rozendal	Harry Rozendal	
	Jos Alberts	Ludo Giesberts	Jan van Wijk	Jan van Wijk	Michel Cornelisse	Michel Cornelisse	Menno Vink	Menno Vink
	Danny Lippens	Johan van der Velde	Martin Hendriks	Martin Hendriks	Thomas Dürst	Thomas Dürst	Marco Zen	Marco Zen
	Michel Groenendaal	Danny Vanderaerden		Hansruedi Märki	Hansruedi Märki	Olaf Ludwig	Olaf Ludwig	Olaf Ludwig
				Bernard Gavillet	Arno Ottevanger	Eric Knuvers	Eric Knuvers	Eric Knuvers
				Heinz Imboden	Jean-Paul van Poppel	Jean-Paul van Poppel	Jens Veggerby	
						Jef Lieckens	Jef Lieckens	
						Patrick Strouken	Patrick Strouken	
						Jos Van Der Pas	Jens Heppner	
						Frank van Veenendaal	Michel Legrand	
						Rob Mulders		

== Major wins ==
Sources:

- Stage 13 of the 1987 Tour de France (Erik Breukink)
- Stage 1A of the Giro d'Italia 1987 (Erik Breukink)
- Tour of the Basque Country 1988 (Erik Breukink)
- Maillot blanc the 1988 Tour de France 1988 (Erik Breukink)
- Stage 14 of the Giro d'Italia 1988 (Erik Breukink)
- Prologue 1989 Tour de France (Erik Breukink)
- Züri-Metzgete 1984 (Phil Anderson)
- Rund um den Henninger Turm 1984 (Phil Anderson)
- Catalan Week 1984 (Phil Anderson)
- Critérium du Dauphiné Libéré 1985 (Phil Anderson)
- Tour de Suisse 1985, 3 stage wins (Phil Anderson)
- Rund um den Henninger Turm 1985 (Phil Anderson)
- E3 Prijs Vlaanderen 1985 (Phil Anderson)
- Paris–Tours 1986 (Phil Anderson)
- Milano–Torino 1987 (Phil Anderson)
- Dwars door Vlaanderen 1984 (Walter Planckaert)
- Tour of Belgium 1984, 3 stage wins (Eddy Planckaert)
- Omloop Het Volk 1984 (Eddy Planckaert)
- 3 stage wins Paris–Nice (1984 & 1987) (Eddy Planckaert)
- Étoile de Bessèges 1984 (Eddy Planckaert)
- Omloop Het Volk 1985 (Eddy Planckaert)
- 2 stage wins Vuelta a España 1985 (Eddy Planckaert)
- 1 stage wins 1985 Tour de France (Eddy Planckaert)
- E3 Prijs Vlaanderen 1987 (Eddy Planckaert)
- 2 stages Giro d'Italia 1989 (Jean-Paul van Poppel)
- Veenendaal–Veenendaal 1989 (Jean-Paul van Poppel)
