= 1993 UCI Road World Cup =

Series of bicycle races

- Fifth edition of the UCI Road World Cup

Details
- Dates: 20 March – 16 October
- Location: Europe
- Races: 11

Champions
- Individual champion: Maurizio Fondriest (ITA) (Lampre–Polti)
- Teams' champion: Lampre–Polti

The 1993 UCI Road World Cup was the fifth edition of the UCI Road World Cup. It was won by Italian classics specialist Maurizio Fondriest of the Lampre–Polti team.

== Races ==
Date	Race	Country	Winner	Team	World Cup Leader	Leader's Team	Report
20 March	Milan–San Remo	Italy	Maurizio Fondriest (ITA)	Lampre–Polti	Maurizio Fondriest (ITA)	Lampre–Polti	Report
4 April	Tour of Flanders	Belgium	Johan Museeuw (BEL)	GB–MG Maglificio	Maurizio Fondriest (ITA)	Lampre–Polti	Report
11 April	Paris–Roubaix	France	Gilbert Duclos-Lassalle (FRA)	GAN	Johan Museeuw (BEL)	GB–MG Maglificio	Report
18 April	Liège–Bastogne–Liège	Belgium	Rolf Sørensen (DEN)	Carrera Jeans–Tassoni	Maurizio Fondriest (ITA)	Lampre–Polti	Report
24 April	Amstel Gold Race	Netherlands	Rolf Jaermann (SUI)	Ariostea	Maurizio Fondriest (ITA)	Lampre–Polti	Report
7 August	Clásica de San Sebastián	Spain	Claudio Chiappucci (ITA)	Carrera Jeans–Tassoni	Maurizio Fondriest (ITA)	Lampre–Polti	Report
15 August	Wincanton Classic	United Kingdom	Alberto Volpi (ITA)	Mecair–Ballan	Maurizio Fondriest (ITA)	Lampre–Polti	Report
22 August	Züri-Metzgete	Switzerland	Maurizio Fondriest (ITA)	Lampre–Polti	Maurizio Fondriest (ITA)	Lampre–Polti	Report
3 October	Paris–Tours	France	Johan Museeuw (BEL)	GB–MG Maglificio	Maurizio Fondriest (ITA)	Lampre–Polti	Report
9 October	Giro di Lombardia	Italy	Pascal Richard (SUI)	Ariostea	Maurizio Fondriest (ITA)	Lampre–Polti	Report
16 October	Grand Prix des Nations	France	Armand de Las Cuevas (FRA)	Castorama	Maurizio Fondriest (ITA)	Lampre–Polti	Report

== Single races details ==
worldcupjersey	Denotes the Classification Leader

In the race results the leader jersey identify the rider who wore the jersey in the race (the leader at the start of the race).

In the general classification table the jersey identify the leader after the race.

20 March 1993 — Milan–San Remo 297 km (184.5 mi)

	Rider	Team	Time
1	Maurizio Fondriest (ITA)	Lampre–Polti	7h 25' 37"
2	Luca Gelfi (ITA)	Mapei–Viner	+ 4"
3	Max Sciandri (ITA)	Motorola	+ 9"
4	Laurent Jalabert (FRA)	ONCE	s.t.
5	Rolf Sørensen (DEN)	Carrera Jeans–Tassoni	s.t.
6	Giorgio Furlan (ITA)	Ariostea	s.t.
7	Franco Ballerini (ITA)	GB–MG Maglificio	s.t.
8	Jean-Claude Colotti (FRA)	GAN	s.t.
9	Davide Cassani (ITA)	Ariostea	s.t.
10	Mario Cipollini (ITA)	GB–MG Maglificio	s.t.

General classification after Milan–San Remo

	Rider	Team	Points
1	Maurizio Fondriest (ITA)	Lampre–Polti	50
2	Luca Gelfi (ITA)	Mapei–Viner	35
3	Max Sciandri (ITA)	Motorola	25
4	Laurent Jalabert (FRA)	ONCE	20
5	Rolf Sørensen (DEN)	Carrera Jeans–Tassoni	18
6	Giorgio Furlan (ITA)	Ariostea	16
7	Franco Ballerini (ITA)	GB–MG Maglificio	14
8	Jean-Claude Colotti (FRA)	GAN	12
9	Davide Cassani (ITA)	Ariostea	10
10	Mario Cipollini (ITA)	GB–MG Maglificio	8

4 April 1993 — Tour of Flanders 263 km (163.4 mi)

	Rider	Team	Time
1	Johan Museeuw (BEL)	GB–MG Maglificio	6h 33' 00"
2	Frans Maassen (NED)	WordPerfect–Colnago–Decca	s.t.
3	Dario Bottaro (ITA)	Mecair–Ballan	+ 22"
4	Marc Sergeant (BEL)	Novemail–Histor–Laser Computer	+ 33"
5	Max Sciandri (ITA)	Motorola	+ 46"
6	Franco Ballerini (ITA)	GB–MG Maglificio	s.t.
7	Edwig Van Hooydonck (BEL)	WordPerfect–Colnago–Decca	s.t.
8	Maurizio Fondriest (ITA)	Lampre–Polti	s.t.
9	Olaf Ludwig (GER)	Team Telekom	+ 1' 03"
10	Johan Capiot (BEL)	TVM–Bison Kit	s.t.

General classification after Tour of Flanders

	Rider	Team	Points
1	Maurizio Fondriest (ITA)	Lampre–Polti	62
2	Johan Museeuw (BEL)	GB–MG Maglificio	50
3	Max Sciandri (ITA)	Motorola	43
4	Frans Maassen (NED)	WordPerfect–Colnago–Decca	35
5	Luca Gelfi (ITA)	Mapei–Viner	35
6	Franco Ballerini (ITA)	GB–MG Maglificio	30
7	Dario Bottaro (ITA)	Mecair–Ballan	25
8	Marc Sergeant (BEL)	Novemail–Histor–Laser Computer	20
9	Laurent Jalabert (FRA)	ONCE	20
10	Rolf Sørensen (DEN)	Carrera Jeans–Tassoni	18

11 April 1993 — Paris–Roubaix 267 km (165.9 mi)

	Rider	Team	Time
1	Gilbert Duclos-Lassalle (FRA)	GAN	6h 25' 20"
2	Franco Ballerini (ITA)	GB–MG Maglificio	s.t.
3	Olaf Ludwig (GER)	Team Telekom	+ 2' 09"
4	Johan Museeuw (BEL)	GB–MG Maglificio	s.t.
5	Adrie van der Poel (NED)	Mercatone Uno–Zucchini–Medeghini	s.t.
6	Edwig Van Hooydonck (BEL)	WordPerfect–Colnago–Decca	s.t.
7	Marc Sergeant (BEL)	Novemail–Histor–Laser Computer	s.t.
8	Sean Yates (GBR)	Motorola	s.t.
9	Benjamin Van Itterbeeck (BEL)	Collstrop–Assur Carpets	s.t.
10	Wilfried Nelissen (BEL)	Novemail–Histor–Laser Computer	+ 3' 50"

General classification after Paris–Roubaix

	Rider	Team	Points
1	Johan Museeuw (BEL)	GB–MG Maglificio	70
2	Franco Ballerini (ITA)	GB–MG Maglificio	65
3	Maurizio Fondriest (ITA)	Lampre–Polti	62
4	Gilbert Duclos-Lassalle (FRA)	GAN	50
5	Max Sciandri (ITA)	Motorola	43
6	Frans Maassen (NED)	WordPerfect–Colnago–Decca	35
7	Luca Gelfi (ITA)	Mapei–Viner	35
8	Olaf Ludwig (GER)	Team Telekom	35
9	Marc Sergeant (BEL)	Novemail–Histor–Laser Computer	34
10	Edwig Van Hooydonck (BEL)	WordPerfect–Colnago–Decca	30

18 April 1993 — Liège–Bastogne–Liège 261 km (162.2 mi)

	Rider	Team	Time
1	Rolf Sørensen (DEN)	Carrera Jeans–Tassoni	7h 14' 08"
2	Tony Rominger (SUI)	CLAS–Cajastur	+ 1"
3	Maurizio Fondriest (ITA)	Lampre–Polti	+ 21"
4	Jan Nevens (BEL)	Lotto	s.t.
5	Moreno Argentin (ITA)	Mecair–Ballan	+ 37"
6	Claudio Chiappucci (ITA)	Carrera Jeans–Tassoni	+ 1' 05"
7	Giorgio Furlan (ITA)	Ariostea	s.t.
8	Viatcheslav Ekimov (RUS)	Novemail–Histor–Laser Computer	+ 1' 43"
9	Laurent Jalabert (FRA)	ONCE	s.t.
10	Steven Rooks (NED)	Festina–Lotus	s.t.

General classification after Liège–Bastogne–Liège

	Rider	Team	Points
1	Maurizio Fondriest (ITA)	Lampre–Polti	87
2	Johan Museeuw (BEL)	GB–MG Maglificio	75
3	Rolf Sørensen (DEN)	Carrera Jeans–Tassoni	68
4	Franco Ballerini (ITA)	GB–MG Maglificio	65
5	Gilbert Duclos-Lassalle (FRA)	GAN	50
6	Max Sciandri (ITA)	Motorola	43
7	Tony Rominger (SUI)	CLAS–Cajastur	35
8	Frans Maassen (NED)	WordPerfect–Colnago–Decca	35
9	Luca Gelfi (ITA)	Mapei–Viner	35
10	Olaf Ludwig (GER)	Team Telekom	35

24 April 1993 — Amstel Gold Race 250 km (155.3 mi)

	Rider	Team	Time
1	Rolf Järmann (SUI)	Ariostea	6h 40' 04"
2	Gianni Bugno (ITA)	Gatorade–Mega Drive–Kenwood	s.t.
3	Jens Heppner (GER)	Team Telekom	+ 1' 02"
4	Maurizio Fondriest (ITA)	Lampre–Polti	+ 1' 07"
5	Max Sciandri (ITA)	Motorola	s.t.
6	Adrie van der Poel (NED)	Mercatone Uno–Zucchini–Medeghini	s.t.
7	Davide Cassani (ITA)	Ariostea	s.t.
8	Gert-Jan Theunisse (NED)	TVM–Bison Kit	s.t.
9	Giorgio Furlan (ITA)	Ariostea	+ 2' 17"
10	Franco Ballerini (ITA)	GB–MG Maglificio	s.t.

General classification after Amstel Gold Race

	Rider	Team	Points
1	Maurizio Fondriest (ITA)	Lampre–Polti	107
2	Johan Museeuw (BEL)	GB–MG Maglificio	75
3	Franco Ballerini (ITA)	GB–MG Maglificio	73
4	Rolf Sørensen (DEN)	Carrera Jeans–Tassoni	68
5	Max Sciandri (ITA)	Motorola	61
6	Rolf Järmann (SUI)	Ariostea	50
7	Gilbert Duclos-Lassalle (FRA)	GAN	50
8	Frans Maassen (NED)	WordPerfect–Colnago–Decca	40
9	Giorgio Furlan (ITA)	Ariostea	40
10	Gianni Bugno (ITA)	Gatorade–Mega Drive–Kenwood	35
10	Tony Rominger (SUI)	CLAS–Cajastur	35
10	Luca Gelfi (ITA)	Mapei–Viner	35
10	Olaf Ludwig (GER)	Team Telekom	35

7 August 1993 — Clásica de San Sebastián 234 km (145.4 mi)

	Rider	Team	Time
1	Claudio Chiappucci (ITA)	Carrera Jeans–Tassoni	5h 47' 51"
2	Gianni Faresin (ITA)	ZG Mobili	+ 2"
3	Alberto Volpi (ITA)	Mecair–Ballan	+ 24"
4	Iñaki Gastón (ESP)	CLAS–Cajastur	s.t.
5	Marco Giovannetti (ITA)	Eldor–Viner	s.t.
6	Bo André Namtvedt (NOR)	Subaru–Montgomery	+ 31"
7	Bruno Cornillet (FRA)	Novemail–Histor–Laser Computer	s.t.
8	Maurizio Fondriest (ITA)	Lampre–Polti	s.t.
9	Massimo Ghirotto (ITA)	ZG Mobili	s.t.
10	Stefano Colagè (ITA)	ZG Mobili	s.t.

General classification after Clásica de San Sebastián

	Rider	Team	Points
1	Maurizio Fondriest (ITA)	Lampre–Polti	119
2	Johan Museeuw (BEL)	GB–MG Maglificio	75
3	Franco Ballerini (ITA)	GB–MG Maglificio	73
4	Rolf Sørensen (DEN)	Carrera Jeans–Tassoni	68
5	Claudio Chiappucci (ITA)	Carrera Jeans–Tassoni	66
6	Max Sciandri (ITA)	Motorola	61
7	Rolf Järmann (SUI)	Ariostea	50
8	Gilbert Duclos-Lassalle (FRA)	GAN	50
9	Frans Maassen (NED)	WordPerfect–Colnago–Decca	40
10	Giorgio Furlan (ITA)	Ariostea	40

15 August 1993 — Wincanton Classic 231 km (143.5 mi)

	Rider	Team	Time
1	Alberto Volpi (ITA)	Mecair–Ballan	5h 41' 22"
2	Jesper Skibby (DEN)	TVM–Bison Kit	+ 3"
3	Maurizio Fondriest (ITA)	Lampre–Polti	s.t.
4	Max Sciandri (ITA)	Motorola	s.t.
5	Lance Armstrong (USA)	Motorola	+ 36"
6	Gert-Jan Theunisse (NED)	TVM–Bison Kit	s.t.
7	Heinz Imboden (SUI)	Mecair–Ballan	s.t.
8	Johan Museeuw (BEL)	GB–MG Maglificio	+ 6' 30"
9	Andreas Kappes (GER)	Mecair–Ballan	s.t.
10	Scott Sunderland (AUS)	TVM–Bison Kit	s.t.

General classification after Wincanton Classic

	Rider	Team	Points
1	Maurizio Fondriest (ITA)	Lampre–Polti	144
2	Johan Museeuw (BEL)	GB–MG Maglificio	87
3	Max Sciandri (ITA)	Motorola	81
4	Alberto Volpi (ITA)	Mecair–Ballan	75
5	Franco Ballerini (ITA)	GB–MG Maglificio	73
6	Rolf Sørensen (DEN)	Carrera Jeans–Tassoni	68
7	Claudio Chiappucci (ITA)	Carrera Jeans–Tassoni	66
8	Rolf Järmann (SUI)	Ariostea	50
9	Gilbert Duclos-Lassalle (FRA)	GAN	50
10	Frans Maassen (NED)	WordPerfect–Colnago–Decca	40
10	Giorgio Furlan (ITA)	Ariostea	40

22 August 1993 — Züri-Metzgete 239.2 km (148.6 mi)

	Rider	Team	Time
1	Maurizio Fondriest (ITA)	Lampre–Polti	6h 23' 38"
2	Charly Mottet (FRA)	Novemail–Histor–Laser Computer	s.t.
3	Bruno Cenghialta (ITA)	Ariostea	s.t.
4	Jens Heppner (GER)	Team Telekom	s.t.
5	Santos Hernández (ESP)	Mapei–Viner	s.t.
6	Stefano Della Santa (ITA)	Mapei–Viner	+ 12"
7	Claudio Chiappucci (ITA)	Carrera Jeans–Tassoni	+ 47"
8	Alberto Elli (ITA)	Ariostea	+ 51"
9	Scott Sunderland (AUS)	TVM–Bison Kit	+ 52"
10	Max Sciandri (ITA)	Motorola	s.t.

General classification after Züri-Metzgete

	Rider	Team	Points
1	Maurizio Fondriest (ITA)	Lampre–Polti	194
2	Max Sciandri (ITA)	Motorola	89
3	Johan Museeuw (BEL)	GB–MG Maglificio	87
4	Claudio Chiappucci (ITA)	Carrera Jeans–Tassoni	80
5	Alberto Volpi (ITA)	Mecair–Ballan	75
6	Franco Ballerini (ITA)	GB–MG Maglificio	73
7	Rolf Sørensen (DEN)	Carrera Jeans–Tassoni	68
8	Jens Heppner (GER)	Team Telekom	51
9	Rolf Järmann (SUI)	Ariostea	50
10	Gilbert Duclos-Lassalle (FRA)	GAN	50

3 October 1993 — Paris–Tours 251 km (156.0 mi)

	Rider	Team	Time
1	Johan Museeuw (BEL)	GB–MG Maglificio	6h 34' 50"
2	Maurizio Fondriest (ITA)	Lampre–Polti	s.t.
3	Alexander Gontchenkov (UKR)	Lampre–Polti	+ 5"
4	Sean Kelly (IRL)	Festina–Lotus	s.t.
5	Adri van der Poel (NED)	Mercatone Uno–Zucchini–Medeghini	s.t.
6	Alain Van Den Bossche (BEL)	TVM–Bison Kit	s.t.
7	Martin van Steen (NED)	TVM–Bison Kit	s.t.
8	Jean-Pierre Heynderickx (BEL)	Collstrop–Assur Carpets	s.t.
9	Jesper Skibby (DEN)	TVM–Bison Kit	s.t.
10	Fabio Baldato (ITA)	GB–MG Maglificio	s.t.

General classification after Paris–Tours

	Rider	Team	Points
1	Maurizio Fondriest (ITA)	Lampre–Polti	229
2	Johan Museeuw (BEL)	GB–MG Maglificio	137
3	Max Sciandri (ITA)	Motorola	89
4	Claudio Chiappucci (ITA)	Carrera Jeans–Tassoni	80
5	Alberto Volpi (ITA)	Mecair–Ballan	75
6	Franco Ballerini (ITA)	GB–MG Maglificio	73
7	Rolf Sørensen (DEN)	Carrera Jeans–Tassoni	68
8	Adri van der Poel (NED)	Mercatone Uno–Zucchini–Medeghini	52
9	Jens Heppner (GER)	Team Telekom	51
10	Rolf Järmann (SUI)	Ariostea	50
10	Gilbert Duclos-Lassalle (FRA)*	GAN	50

Unclear if Duclos-Lassalle has started the minimum races to be classified.

9 October 1993 — Giro di Lombardia 242 km (150.4 mi)

	Rider	Team	Time
1	Pascal Richard (SUI)	Ariostea	6h 04' 38"
2	Giorgio Furlan (ITA)	Ariostea	s.t.
3	Max Sciandri (ITA)	Motorola	+ 7"
4	Claudio Chiappucci (ITA)	Carrera Jeans–Tassoni	s.t.
5	Charly Mottet (FRA)	Novemail–Histor–Laser Computer	+ 1' 03"
6	Jesper Skibby (DEN)	TVM–Bison Kit	s.t.
7	Piotr Ugrumov (LAT)	Mecair–Ballan	s.t.
8	Massimo Podenzana (ITA)	Navigare–Blue Storm	s.t.
9	Dimitri Konyshev (RUS)	Jolly Componibili–Club 88	+ 1' 14"
10	Viatcheslav Ekimov (RUS)	Novemail–Histor–Laser Computer	+ 1' 19"

General classification after Giro di Lombardia

	Rider	Team	Points
1	Maurizio Fondriest (ITA)	Lampre–Polti	235
2	Johan Museeuw (BEL)	GB–MG Maglificio	137
3	Max Sciandri (ITA)	Motorola	114
4	Claudio Chiappucci (ITA)	Carrera Jeans–Tassoni	100
5	Alberto Volpi (ITA)	Mecair–Ballan	75
6	Giorgio Furlan (ITA)	Ariostea	75
7	Franco Ballerini (ITA)	GB–MG Maglificio	73
8	Rolf Sørensen (DEN)	Carrera Jeans–Tassoni	68
9	Adri van der Poel (NED)	Mercatone Uno–Zucchini–Medeghini	52
10	Jens Heppner (GER)	Team Telekom	51

Jesper Skibby (61 points) Charly Mottet (53 points) have not competed in enough races to be classified.

16 October 1993 — Grand Prix des Nations 62.5 km (38.8 mi) (ITT)

	Cyclist	Team	Time
1	Armand de Las Cuevas (FRA)	Banesto	1h 20' 54"
2	Stephen Hodge (AUS)	ONCE	+ 1' 02"
3	Eddy Seigneur (FRA)	GAN	+ 1' 27"
4	Chris Boardman (GBR)	GAN	+ 2' 39"
5	Jelle Nijdam (NED)	WordPerfect–Colnago–Decca	+ 2' 51"
6	Pascal Lance (FRA)	GAN	+ 3' 07"
7	Maurizio Fondriest (ITA)	Lampre–Polti	+ 3' 33"
8	Edwig Van Hooydonck (BEL)	WordPerfect–Colnago–Decca	+ 3' 48"
9	Peter Meinert Nielsen (DEN)	TVM–Bison Kit	+ 4' 31"
10	Laurent Bezault (FRA)	GAN	+ 4' 34"

Fondriest (7th), Museeuw (19th) and Volpi (20th, last) are the only riders eligible for World Cup points for this race.

The other eligible riders chose to did not start.

General classification after Grand Prix des Nations

	Cyclist	Team	Points
1	Maurizio Fondriest (ITA)	Lampre–Polti	287
2	Johan Museeuw (BEL)	GB–MG Maglificio	172
3	Max Sciandri (ITA)	Motorola	114
4	Claudio Chiappucci (ITA)	Carrera Jeans–Tassoni	100
5	Alberto Volpi (ITA)	Mecair–Ballan	100
6	Giorgio Furlan (ITA)	Ariostea	75
7	Franco Ballerini (ITA)	GB–MG Maglificio	73
8	Rolf Sørensen (DEN)	Carrera Jeans–Tassoni	68
9	Adri van der Poel (NED)	Mercatone Uno–Zucchini–Medeghini	52
10	Jens Heppner (GER)	Team Telekom	51

Jesper Skibby (61 points) Charly Mottet (53 points) have not competed in enough races to be classified.

== Final standings ==
=== Individual ===
For the first ten races, points are awarded to the top 12 classified riders. Riders must start at least 6 races to be classified.

The points are awarded for every race using the following system:

Position	1st	2nd	3rd	4th	5th	6th	7th	8th	9th	10th	11th	12th
Points	50	35	25	20	18	16	14	12	10	8	6	5

The last race awarded the same points but only some riders are eligible.

Pos.	Rider	Team	MSR	ToF	ROU	LBL	AGR	CSS	WIN	ZUR	TOU	LOM	NAT	Pts.
1	Maurizio Fondriest (ITA)	Lampre–Polti	50	12	DNS	25	20	12	25	50	35	6#	50	287
2	Johan Museeuw (BEL)	GB–MG Maglificio	0	50	20	5	0	?	12	0	50	?	35	172
3	Max Sciandri (ITA)	Motorola	25	18	?	0	18	0	20	8	0	25	DNS	114
4	Claudio Chiappucci (ITA)	Carrera Jeans–Tassoni	0	?	DNS	16	?	50	DNS	14	0	20	DNS	100
5	Alberto Volpi (ITA)	Mecair–Ballan	0	?	?	0	?	25	50	0	?	?	25	100
6	Giorgio Furlan (ITA)	Ariostea	16	?	?	14	10	?	DNS	?	0	35	DNS	75
7	Franco Ballerini (ITA)	GB–MG Maglificio	14	16	35	0	8	0	0	0	0	0	DNS	73
8	Rolf Sørensen (DEN)	Carrera Jeans–Tassoni	18	0	DNS	50	0	0	DNS	?	0	0	DNS	68
9	Adri van der Poel (NED)	Mercatone Uno–Zucchini–Medeghini	0	0	18	0	16	0	DNS	0	18	0	DNS	52
10	Jens Heppner (GER)	Team Telekom	?	?	?	0	25	0	6	20	?	0	DNS	51
Race winners not eligible for general classification or out of top 10
Pos.	Rider	Team	MSR	ToF	ROU	LBL	AGR	CSS	WIN	ZUR	TOU	LOM	NAT	Pts.
?	Pascal Richard (SUI)	Ariostea	0	?	?	0	?	?	DNS	?	?	50	DNS	50
?	Rolf Jaermann (SUI)	Ariostea	0	?	?	0	50	?	DNS	0	0	?	DNS	50
?	Gilbert Duclos-Lassalle (FRA)	GAN	0	0	50	?	0	?	?	?	?	?	DNS	50
-	Armand de Las Cuevas (FRA)	Banesto	DNS	?	?	?	?	?	?	?	?	?	0	0

# Fondriest finished 11th in Giro di Lombardia but all sources gave him 8 points instead than 6.

Key
Colour	Result
Gold	Winner
Silver	2nd place
Bronze	3rd place
Green	Top ten position
Blue	Other points position
Purple	Out of points, retired
Red	Did not start (DNS)
White	unclear if retired or DNS

=== Team ===
Rank	Team	Points
1	GB–MG Maglificio	75
2	Novemail–Histor–Laser Computer	66
3	TVM–Bison Kit	45
4	Motorola	39
5	Lampre–Polti	32
