= 1993 Giro d'Italia, Stage 1a to Stage 10 =

Cycling race stages

The 1993 Giro d'Italia was the 76th edition of the Giro d'Italia, one of cycling's Grand Tours. The Giro began in Porto Azzurro, with a mountainous stage on 23 May, and Stage 10 occurred on 2 June with a stage to Senigallia. The race finished in Milan on 13 June.

== Stage 1a ==
23 May 1993 — Porto Azzurro to Portoferraio, 85 km (53 mi)

Stage 1a result

Rank	Rider	Team	Time
1	Moreno Argentin (ITA)	Mecair–Ballan	2h 02' 48"
2	Marco Saligari (ITA)	Ariostea	+ 34"
3	Vladimir Poulnikov (UKR)	Carrera Jeans–Tassoni	s.t.
4	Massimo Ghirotto (ITA)	ZG Mobili	s.t.
5	Bruno Leali (ITA)	Mercatone Uno–Zucchini–Medeghini	s.t.
6	Zenon Jaskuła (POL)	GB–MG Maglificio	s.t.
7	Davide Cassani (ITA)	Ariostea	s.t.
8	Adriano Baffi (ITA)	Mercatone Uno–Zucchini–Medeghini	s.t.
9	Andreas Kappes (GER)	Mecair–Ballan	s.t.
10	Dimitri Konyshev (RUS)	Jolly Componibili–Club 88	s.t.

== Stage 1b ==
23 May 1993 — Portoferraio, 9 km (5.6 mi) (ITT)

Stage 1b result

Rank	Rider	Team	Time
1	Maurizio Fondriest (ITA)	Lampre–Polti	10' 38"
2	Miguel Induráin (ESP)	Banesto	+ 2"
3	Eddy Seigneur (FRA)	GAN	+ 5"
4	Gianni Bugno (ITA)	Gatorade–Mega Drive–Kenwood	+ 8"
5	Moreno Argentin (ITA)	Mecair–Ballan	+ 10"
6	Claudio Chiappucci (ITA)	Carrera Jeans–Tassoni	+ 11"
7	Francis Moreau (FRA)	GAN	s.t.
8	Luca Gelfi (ITA)	Mapei–Viner	+ 14"
9	Massimiliano Lelli (ITA)	Ariostea	+ 18"
10	Francesco Casagrande (ITA)	Mercatone Uno–Zucchini–Medeghini	s.t.

General classification after Stage 1b

Rank	Rider	Team	Time
1	Moreno Argentin (ITA)	Mecair–Ballan	2h 13' 24"
2	Maurizio Fondriest (ITA)	Lampre–Polti	+ 36"
3	Miguel Induráin (ESP)	Banesto	+ 38"
4	Eddy Seigneur (FRA)	GAN	+ 41"
5	Gianni Bugno (ITA)	Gatorade–Mega Drive–Kenwood	+ 44"
6	Claudio Chiappucci (ITA)	Carrera Jeans–Tassoni	+ 47"
7	Luca Gelfi (ITA)	Mapei–Viner	+ 50"
8	Marco Saligari (ITA)	Ariostea	+ 51"
9	Massimiliano Lelli (ITA)	Ariostea	+ 54"
10	Francesco Casagrande (ITA)	Mercatone Uno–Zucchini–Medeghini	s.t.

== Stage 2 ==
24 May 1993 — Grosseto to Rieti, 224 km (139 mi)

Stage 2 result

Rank	Rider	Team	Time
1	Adriano Baffi (ITA)	Mercatone Uno–Zucchini–Medeghini	5h 52' 54"
2	Marco Saligari (ITA)	Ariostea	s.t.
3	Dimitri Konyshev (RUS)	Jolly Componibili–Club 88	s.t.
4	Massimo Ghirotto (ITA)	ZG Mobili	s.t.
5	Kai Hundertmarck (GER)	Motorola	s.t.
6	Juan Carlos González Salvador (ESP)	Mapei–Viner	s.t.
7	Laurent Madouas (FRA)	Castorama	s.t.
8	Maurizio Fondriest (ITA)	Lampre–Polti	s.t.
9	Bruno Cenghialta (ITA)	Ariostea	s.t.
10	Alexandr Shefer (RUS)	Navigare–Blue Storm	s.t.

General classification after Stage 2

Rank	Rider	Team	Time
1	Moreno Argentin (ITA)	Mecair–Ballan	8h 06' 18"
2	Maurizio Fondriest (ITA)	Lampre–Polti	+ 36"
3	Miguel Induráin (ESP)	Banesto	+ 38"
4	Marco Saligari (ITA)	Ariostea	+ 43"
5	Gianni Bugno (ITA)	Gatorade–Mega Drive–Kenwood	+ 44"
6	Claudio Chiappucci (ITA)	Carrera Jeans–Tassoni	+ 47"
7	Luca Gelfi (ITA)	Mapei–Viner	+ 50"
8	Massimiliano Lelli (ITA)	Ariostea	+ 54"
9	Francesco Casagrande (ITA)	Mercatone Uno–Zucchini–Medeghini	s.t.
10	Piotr Ugrumov (LAT)	Mecair–Ballan	+ 57"

== Stage 3 ==
25 May 1993 — Rieti to Scanno, 153 km (95 mi)

Stage 3 result

Rank	Rider	Team	Time
1	Piotr Ugrumov (LAT)	Mecair–Ballan	4h 05' 47"
2	Enrico Zaina (ITA)	Mercatone Uno–Zucchini–Medeghini	+ 2"
3	Luc Leblanc (FRA)	Castorama	+ 5"
4	Stephen Roche (IRL)	Carrera Jeans–Tassoni	s.t.
5	Santos Hernández (ESP)	Mapei–Viner	s.t.
6	Roberto Conti (ITA)	Ariostea	s.t.
7	Franco Chioccioli (ITA)	GB–MG Maglificio	s.t.
8	Gianni Bugno (ITA)	Gatorade–Mega Drive–Kenwood	s.t.
9	Massimiliano Lelli (ITA)	Ariostea	s.t.
10	Maurizio Fondriest (ITA)	Lampre–Polti	s.t.

General classification after Stage 3

Rank	Rider	Team	Time
1	Moreno Argentin (ITA)	Mecair–Ballan	12h 12' 24"
2	Piotr Ugrumov (LAT)	Mecair–Ballan	+ 26"
3	Maurizio Fondriest (ITA)	Lampre–Polti	+ 36"
4	Miguel Induráin (ESP)	Banesto	+ 38"
5	Marco Saligari (ITA)	Ariostea	+ 41"
6	Luc Leblanc (FRA)	Castorama	+ 42"
7	Gianni Bugno (ITA)	Gatorade–Mega Drive–Kenwood	+ 44"
8	Enrico Zaina (ITA)	Mercatone Uno–Zucchini–Medeghini	s.t.
9	Claudio Chiappucci (ITA)	Carrera Jeans–Tassoni	+ 47"
10	Luca Gelfi (ITA)	Mapei–Viner	+ 50"

== Stage 4 ==
26 May 1993 — Lago di Scanno to Marcianise, 179 km (111 mi)

Stage 4 result

Rank	Rider	Team	Time
1	Fabio Baldato (ITA)	GB–MG Maglificio	4h 39' 16"
2	Mario Manzoni (ITA)	Gatorade–Mega Drive–Kenwood	s.t.
3	Endrio Leoni (ITA)	Jolly Componibili–Club 88	s.t.
4	Fabio Roscioli (ITA)	Carrera Jeans–Tassoni	s.t.
5	Adriano Baffi (ITA)	Mercatone Uno–Zucchini–Medeghini	s.t.
6	Fabio Casartelli (ITA)	Ariostea	s.t.
7	Laurent Brochard (FRA)	Castorama	s.t.
8	Marco Saligari (ITA)	Ariostea	s.t.
9	Fabiano Fontanelli (ITA)	Navigare–Blue Storm	s.t.
10	Asiat Saitov (RUS)	Kelme–Xacobeo	s.t.

General classification after Stage 4

Rank	Rider	Team	Time
1	Moreno Argentin (ITA)	Mecair–Ballan	16h 51' 40"
2	Piotr Ugrumov (LAT)	Mecair–Ballan	+ 26"
3	Maurizio Fondriest (ITA)	Lampre–Polti	+ 35"
4	Miguel Induráin (ESP)	Banesto	+ 38"
5	Marco Saligari (ITA)	Ariostea	+ 41"
6	Luc Leblanc (FRA)	Castorama	+ 42"
7	Gianni Bugno (ITA)	Gatorade–Mega Drive–Kenwood	s.t.
8	Enrico Zaina (ITA)	Mercatone Uno–Zucchini–Medeghini	+ 44"
9	Claudio Chiappucci (ITA)	Carrera Jeans–Tassoni	+ 47"
10	Luca Gelfi (ITA)	Mapei–Viner	+ 50"

== Stage 5 ==
27 May 1993 — Paestum to Terme Luigiane, 210 km (130 mi)

Stage 5 result

Rank	Rider	Team	Time
1	Dimitri Konyshev (RUS)	Jolly Componibili–Club 88	5h 38' 53"
2	Stefano Della Santa (ITA)	Mapei–Viner	+ 2"
3	Flavio Giupponi (ITA)	Mercatone Uno–Zucchini–Medeghini	+ 3"
4	Maurizio Fondriest (ITA)	Lampre–Polti	s.t.
5	Luc Leblanc (FRA)	Castorama	+ 4"
6	Giorgio Furlan (ITA)	Ariostea	s.t.
7	Adriano Baffi (ITA)	Mercatone Uno–Zucchini–Medeghini	s.t.
8	Massimiliano Lelli (ITA)	Ariostea	s.t.
9	Gianni Bugno (ITA)	Gatorade–Mega Drive–Kenwood	s.t.
10	Miguel Induráin (ESP)	Banesto	s.t.

General classification after Stage 5

Rank	Rider	Team	Time
1	Moreno Argentin (ITA)	Mecair–Ballan	22h 30' 37"
2	Piotr Ugrumov (LAT)	Mecair–Ballan	+ 26"
3	Maurizio Fondriest (ITA)	Lampre–Polti	+ 35"
4	Miguel Induráin (ESP)	Banesto	+ 38"
5	Marco Saligari (ITA)	Ariostea	+ 41"
6	Luc Leblanc (FRA)	Castorama	+ 42"
7	Gianni Bugno (ITA)	Gatorade–Mega Drive–Kenwood	s.t.
8	Enrico Zaina (ITA)	Mercatone Uno–Zucchini–Medeghini	+ 44"
9	Dimitri Konyshev (RUS)	Jolly Componibili–Club 88	+ 46"
10	Claudio Chiappucci (ITA)	Carrera Jeans–Tassoni	+ 47"

== Stage 6 ==
28 May 1993 — Villafranca Tirrena to Messina, 130 km (81 mi)

Stage 6 result

Rank	Rider	Team	Time
1	Guido Bontempi (ITA)	Carrera Jeans–Tassoni	3h 06' 44"
2	Adriano Baffi (ITA)	Mercatone Uno–Zucchini–Medeghini	s.t.
3	Gianni Bugno (ITA)	Gatorade–Mega Drive–Kenwood	s.t.
4	Massimo Ghirotto (ITA)	ZG Mobili	s.t.
5	Dimitri Konyshev (RUS)	Jolly Componibili–Club 88	s.t.
6	Laurent Brochard (FRA)	Castorama	s.t.
7	Franco Chioccioli (ITA)	GB–MG Maglificio	s.t.
8	Maurizio Fondriest (ITA)	Lampre–Polti	s.t.
9	Udo Bölts (GER)	Team Telekom	s.t.
10	Marco Saligari (ITA)	Ariostea	s.t.

General classification after Stage 6

Rank	Rider	Team	Time
1	Moreno Argentin (ITA)	Mecair–Ballan	25h 37' 21"
2	Piotr Ugrumov (LAT)	Mecair–Ballan	+ 26"
3	Maurizio Fondriest (ITA)	Lampre–Polti	+ 35"
4	Gianni Bugno (ITA)	Gatorade–Mega Drive–Kenwood	+ 38"
5	Miguel Induráin (ESP)	Banesto	s.t.
6	Marco Saligari (ITA)	Ariostea	+ 41"
7	Luc Leblanc (FRA)	Castorama	+ 42"
8	Enrico Zaina (ITA)	Mercatone Uno–Zucchini–Medeghini	+ 44"
9	Dimitri Konyshev (RUS)	Jolly Componibili–Club 88	+ 46"
10	Claudio Chiappucci (ITA)	Carrera Jeans–Tassoni	+ 47"

== Stage 7 ==
29 May 1993 — Capo d'Orlando to Agrigento, 240 km (150 mi)

Stage 7 result

Rank	Rider	Team	Time
1	Bjarne Riis (DEN)	Ariostea	6h 55' 19"
2	Michele Coppolillo (ITA)	Navigare–Blue Storm	s.t.
3	Giancarlo Perini (ITA)	ZG Mobili	+ 3"
4	Fabio Baldato (ITA)	GB–MG Maglificio	+ 1' 21"
5	Endrio Leoni (ITA)	Jolly Componibili–Club 88	s.t.
6	Adriano Baffi (ITA)	Mercatone Uno–Zucchini–Medeghini	s.t.
7	Mario Manzoni (ITA)	Gatorade–Mega Drive–Kenwood	s.t.
8	Uwe Raab (GER)	Team Telekom	s.t.
9	Maurizio Molinari (ITA)	Amore & Vita–Galatron	s.t.
10	Bruno Risi (SUI)	Amore & Vita–Galatron	s.t.

General classification after Stage 7

Rank	Rider	Team	Time
1	Moreno Argentin (ITA)	Mecair–Ballan	32h 34' 01"
2	Piotr Ugrumov (LAT)	Mecair–Ballan	+ 26"
3	Maurizio Fondriest (ITA)	Lampre–Polti	+ 35"
4	Gianni Bugno (ITA)	Gatorade–Mega Drive–Kenwood	+ 38"
5	Miguel Induráin (ESP)	Banesto	s.t.
6	Marco Saligari (ITA)	Ariostea	+ 41"
7	Luc Leblanc (FRA)	Castorama	+ 42"
8	Enrico Zaina (ITA)	Mercatone Uno–Zucchini–Medeghini	+ 44"
9	Dimitri Konyshev (RUS)	Jolly Componibili–Club 88	+ 46"
10	Claudio Chiappucci (ITA)	Carrera Jeans–Tassoni	+ 47"

== Stage 8 ==
30 May 1993 — Agrigento to Palermo, 140 km (87 mi)

Stage 8 result

Rank	Rider	Team	Time
1	Adriano Baffi (ITA)	Mercatone Uno–Zucchini–Medeghini	3h 28' 35"
2	Endrio Leoni (ITA)	Jolly Componibili–Club 88	s.t.
3	Fabio Baldato (ITA)	GB–MG Maglificio	s.t.
4	Stefano Allocchio (ITA)	Lampre–Polti	s.t.
5	Mario Manzoni (ITA)	Gatorade–Mega Drive–Kenwood	s.t.
6	Ján Svorada (SVK)	Lampre–Polti	s.t.
7	Uwe Raab (GER)	Team Telekom	s.t.
8	Kai Hundertmarck (GER)	Motorola	s.t.
9	Americo Neves (POR)	Artiach–Filipinos–Chiquilin	s.t.
10	Fabio Casartelli (ITA)	Ariostea	s.t.

General classification after Stage 8

Rank	Rider	Team	Time
1	Moreno Argentin (ITA)	Mecair–Ballan	36h 02' 36"
2	Piotr Ugrumov (LAT)	Mecair–Ballan	+ 26"
3	Maurizio Fondriest (ITA)	Lampre–Polti	+ 35"
4	Gianni Bugno (ITA)	Gatorade–Mega Drive–Kenwood	+ 38"
5	Miguel Induráin (ESP)	Banesto	s.t.
6	Marco Saligari (ITA)	Ariostea	+ 39"
7	Luc Leblanc (FRA)	Castorama	+ 42"
8	Enrico Zaina (ITA)	Mercatone Uno–Zucchini–Medeghini	+ 44"
9	Dimitri Konyshev (RUS)	Jolly Componibili–Club 88	+ 46"
10	Claudio Chiappucci (ITA)	Carrera Jeans–Tassoni	+ 47"

== Rest day ==
31 May 1993

== Stage 9 ==
1 June 1993 — Montelibretti to Fabriano, 216 km (134 mi)

Stage 9 result

Rank	Rider	Team	Time
1	Giorgio Furlan (ITA)	Ariostea	5h 38' 14"
2	Mario Chiesa (ITA)	Carrera Jeans–Tassoni	s.t.
3	Enrico Zaina (ITA)	Mercatone Uno–Zucchini–Medeghini	s.t.
4	Mario Manzoni (ITA)	Gatorade–Mega Drive–Kenwood	+ 7"
5	Fabio Baldato (ITA)	GB–MG Maglificio	s.t.
6	Endrio Leoni (ITA)	Jolly Componibili–Club 88	s.t.
7	Adriano Baffi (ITA)	Mercatone Uno–Zucchini–Medeghini	s.t.
8	Juan Carlos González Salvador (ESP)	Mapei–Viner	s.t.
9	Falk Boden (GER)	Festina–Lotus	s.t.
10	Kai Hundertmarck (GER)	Motorola	s.t.

General classification after Stage 9

Rank	Rider	Team	Time
1	Moreno Argentin (ITA)	Mecair–Ballan	41h 40' 57"
2	Piotr Ugrumov (LAT)	Mecair–Ballan	+ 26"
3	Maurizio Fondriest (ITA)	Lampre–Polti	+ 35"
4	Gianni Bugno (ITA)	Gatorade–Mega Drive–Kenwood	+ 38"
5	Miguel Induráin (ESP)	Banesto	s.t.
6	Marco Saligari (ITA)	Ariostea	+ 39"
7	Luc Leblanc (FRA)	Castorama	+ 42"
8	Enrico Zaina (ITA)	Mercatone Uno–Zucchini–Medeghini	+ 44"
9	Dimitri Konyshev (RUS)	Jolly Componibili–Club 88	+ 46"
10	Claudio Chiappucci (ITA)	Carrera Jeans–Tassoni	+ 47"

== Stage 10 ==
2 June 1993 — Senigallia to Senigallia, 28 km (17 mi) (ITT)

Stage 10 result

Rank	Rider	Team	Time
1	Miguel Induráin (ESP)	Banesto	35' 16"
2	Armand de Las Cuevas (FRA)	Banesto	+ 52"
3	Maurizio Fondriest (ITA)	Lampre–Polti	+ 57"
4	Moreno Argentin (ITA)	Mecair–Ballan	+ 1' 00"
5	Luca Gelfi (ITA)	Mapei–Viner	+ 1' 01"
6	Piotr Ugrumov (LAT)	Mecair–Ballan	+ 1' 05"
7	Claudio Chiappucci (ITA)	Carrera Jeans–Tassoni	+ 1' 14"
8	Zenon Jaskuła (POL)	GB–MG Maglificio	+ 1' 28"
9	Massimiliano Lelli (ITA)	Ariostea	+ 1' 31"
10	Franco Chioccioli (ITA)	GB–MG Maglificio	+ 1' 42"

General classification after Stage 10

Rank	Rider	Team	Time
1	Miguel Induráin (ESP)	Banesto	42h 16' 51"
2	Moreno Argentin (ITA)	Mecair–Ballan	+ 22"
3	Piotr Ugrumov (LAT)	Mecair–Ballan	+ 53"
4	Maurizio Fondriest (ITA)	Lampre–Polti	+ 54"
5	Luca Gelfi (ITA)	Mapei–Viner	+ 1' 13"
6	Armand de Las Cuevas (FRA)	Banesto	+ 1' 16"
7	Claudio Chiappucci (ITA)	Carrera Jeans–Tassoni	+ 1' 23"
8	Massimiliano Lelli (ITA)	Ariostea	+ 1' 47"
9	Gianni Bugno (ITA)	Gatorade–Mega Drive–Kenwood	+ 1' 58"
10	Giorgio Furlan (ITA)	Ariostea	+ 2' 06"
