= 1993 Züri-Metzgete =

1993 UCI Road World Cup

Race details
- Dates: 22 August 1993
- Stages: 1
- Distance: 239.2 km (148.6 mi)
- Winning time: 6h 23' 38"

Results
	Winner	Maurizio Fondriest (ITA)	(Lampre–Polti)
	Second	Charly Mottet (FRA)	(Novemail–Histor–Laser Computer)
	Third	Bruno Cenghialta (ITA)	(Ariostea)

The 1993 Züri-Metzgete was the 78th edition of the Züri-Metzgete road cycling one day race. It was held on 22 August 1993 as part of the 1993 UCI Road World Cup. The race took place between the cities of Basel and Zürich and was won by Maurizio Fondriest of Italy.

== Result ==
Rank	Rider	Team	Time
1	Maurizio Fondriest (ITA)	Lampre–Polti	6h 23' 38"
2	Charly Mottet (FRA)	Novemail–Histor–Laser Computer	s.t.
3	Bruno Cenghialta (ITA)	Ariostea	s.t.
4	Jens Heppner (GER)	Team Telekom	s.t.
5	Santos Hernández (ESP)	Mapei–Viner	s.t.
6	Stefano Della Santa (ITA)	Mapei–Viner	+ 12"
7	Claudio Chiappucci (ITA)	Carrera Jeans–Tassoni	+ 47"
8	Alberto Elli (ITA)	Ariostea	+ 51"
9	Scott Sunderland (AUS)	TVM–Bison Kit	+ 52"
10	Max Sciandri (ITA)	Motorola	s.t.
