= 1993 Wincanton Classic =

Road cycling race

1993 UCI Road World Cup

Race details
- Dates: 15 August 1993
- Stages: 1
- Distance: 231 km (143.5 mi)
- Winning time: 5h 41' 22"

Results
	Winner	Alberto Volpi (ITA)	(Mecair–Ballan)
	Second	Jesper Skibby (DEN)	(TVM–Bison Kit)
	Third	Maurizio Fondriest (ITA)	(Lampre–Polti)

The 1993 Wincanton Classic was the 5th edition of the Wincanton Classic cycle race (also known as Leeds International Classic and Rochester International Classic) and was held on 15 August. The race took place in and around Leeds. The race was won by Alberto Volpi of the Mecair–Ballan team.

== Results ==
	Rider	Team	Time
1	Alberto Volpi (ITA)	Mecair–Ballan	5h 41' 22"
2	Jesper Skibby (DEN)	TVM–Bison Kit	+ 3"
3	Maurizio Fondriest (ITA)	Lampre–Polti	s.t.
4	Max Sciandri (ITA)	Motorola	s.t.
5	Lance Armstrong (USA)	Motorola	+ 36"
6	Gert-Jan Theunisse (NED)	TVM–Bison Kit	s.t.
7	Heinz Imboden (SUI)	Mecair–Ballan	s.t.
8	Johan Museeuw (BEL)	GB–MG Maglificio	+ 6' 30"
9	Andreas Kappes (GER)	Mecair–Ballan	s.t.
10	Scott Sunderland (AUS)	TVM–Bison Kit	s.t.
