= 1989 Giro del Trentino =

Race details
- Dates: 8–10 May 1989
- Stages: 3
- Distance: 601 km (373.4 mi)
- Winning time: 14h 40' 16"

Results
	Winner	Mauro-Antonio Santaromita (ITA)
	Second	Claudio Chiappucci (ITA)
	Third	Luca Gelfi (ITA)

The 1989 Giro del Trentino was the 13th edition of the Tour of the Alps cycle race and was held on 8 May to 10 May 1989. The race started in Riva del Garda and finished in Arco. The race was won by Mauro-Antonio Santaromita.

== General classification ==
Final general classification

Rank	Rider	Time
1	Mauro-Antonio Santaromita (ITA)	14h 40' 16"
2	Claudio Chiappucci (ITA)	+ 43"
3	Luca Gelfi (ITA)	+ 58"
4	Francesco Cesarini (ITA)	+ 1' 34"
5	Massimiliano Lelli (ITA)	+ 2' 33"
6	Marco Zen (ITA)	+ 2' 49"
7	Marco Saligari (ITA)	+ 3' 06"
8	Daniele Pizzol (ITA)	+ 6' 13"
9	Stefano Giuliani (ITA)	+ 8' 26"
10	Salvatore Cavallaro (ITA)	+ 10' 13"
