= Michel Dernies =

Belgian cyclist

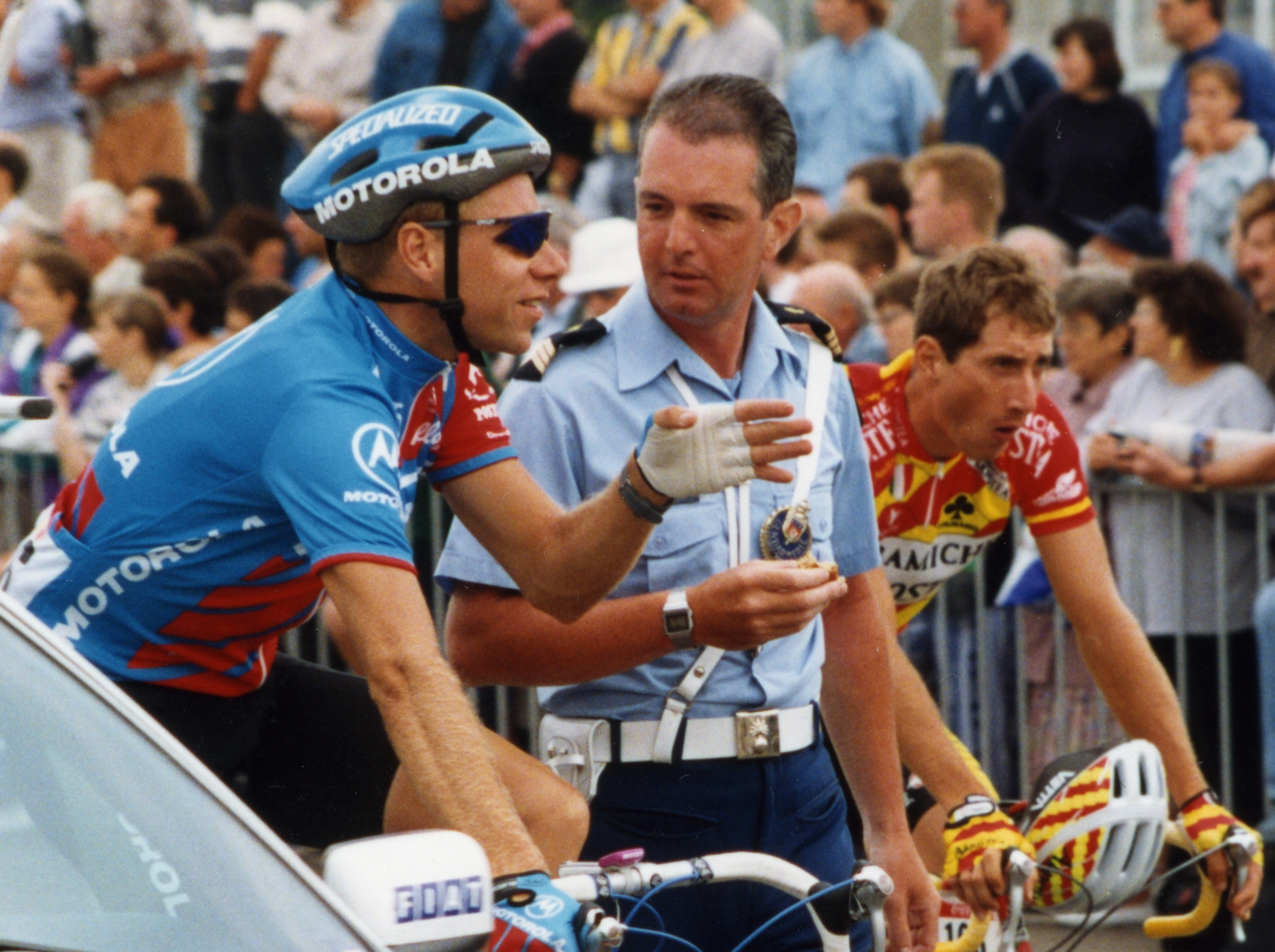
- Dernies at the 1993 Tour de France

Personal information
- Born: 6 January 1961 (age 65) Nivelles, Belgium
- Height: 1.8 m (5 ft 11 in)
- Weight: 75 kg (165 lb)

Cycling career
- Sport: Cycling
- Current team: Van Rysel–Roubaix
- Discipline: Road
- Role: Rider (retired); Team manager; Directeur sportif

Professional teams
- 1983–1984: Fangio–Tönissteiner–OM Trucks–Mavic
- 1985–1988: Lotto
- 1989–1991: Domex–Weinmann
- 1992–1995: Motorola

Managerial teams
- 2011–2014: Wallonie Bruxelles–Crédit Agricole
- 2016–: Roubaix–Métropole Européenne de Lille

Michel Dernies (born 6 January 1961) is a Belgian former racing cyclist, who rode in twelve Grand Tours between 1985 and 1994. He currently works as a directeur sportif for UCI Continental team Van Rysel–Roubaix.

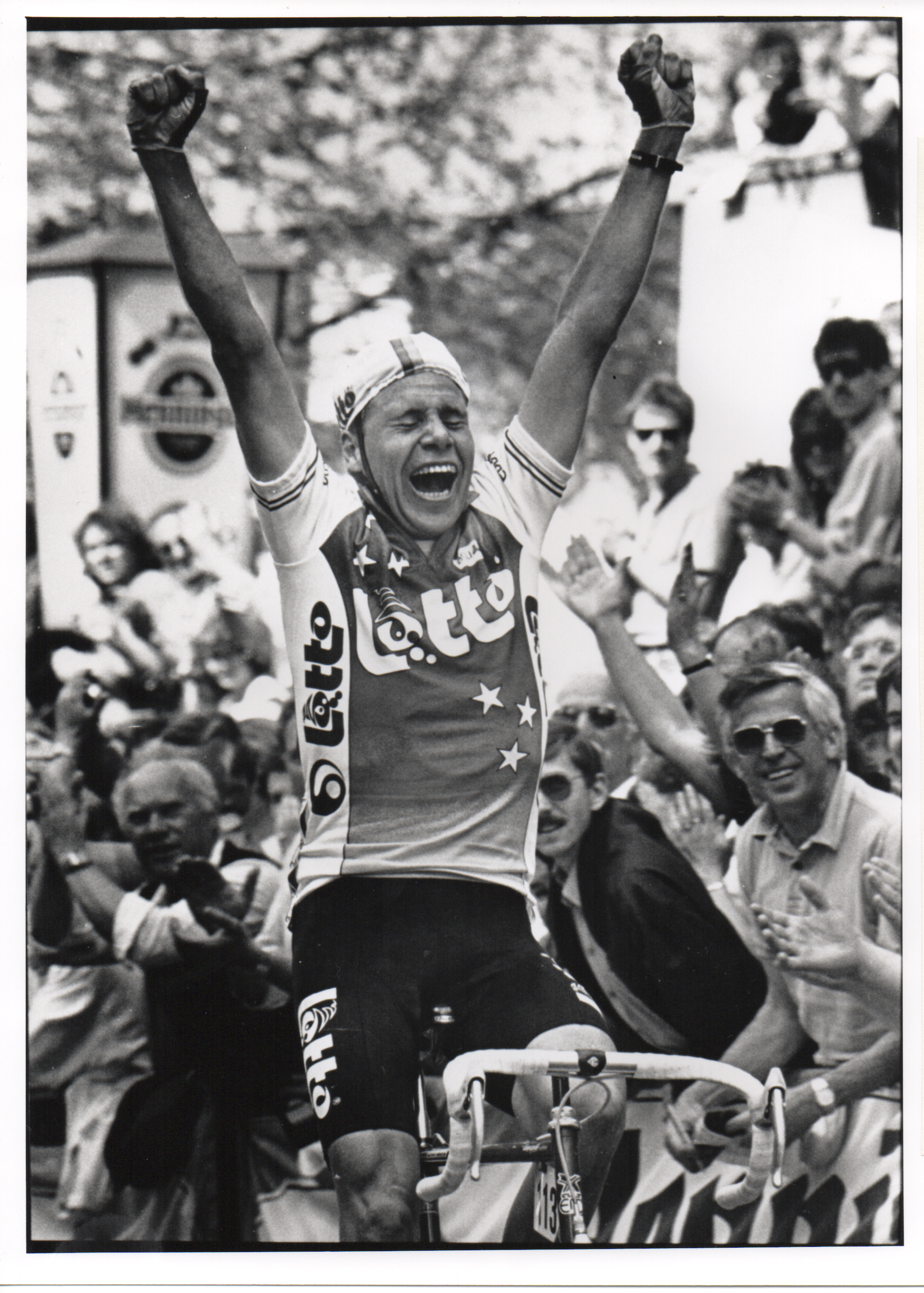
Belgian Michel Dernies celebrates as he crosses the finishing line to win the Round the Henninger Tower cycle race in Frankfurt, Germany on May 1, 1988.

== Major results ==
1983
1st Stage 2 Tour Européen Lorraine-Alsace
3rd Road race, National Road Championships
1985
3rd Binche-Tournai-Binche
1986
2nd Grand Prix de Wallonie
1988
1st Rund um den Henninger Turm
2nd Liège–Bastogne–Liège
1990
1st Overall Tour of Britain

1st Stage 3

1st Stage 4 Tour de Romandie
2nd Grand Prix de Wallonie
2nd Paris–Brussels
3rd Grand Prix de Momignies
5th Overall Route du Sud

1st Stage 1

6th Wincanton Classic
8th Tour du Nord-Ouest
1991
1st Binche-Tournai-Binche

=== Grand Tour general classification results timeline ===
Grand Tour	1985	1986	1987	1988	1989	1990	1991	1992	1993	1994
Giro d'Italia	—	—	—	—	—	—	—	84	125	81
Tour de France	96	113	115	—	108	58	105	106	116	104
Vuelta a España	Did not contest during his career									
