= 1993 Clásica de San Sebastián =

Race details
- Dates: 7 August 1993
- Stages: 1
- Distance: 234 km (145.4 mi)
- Winning time: 5h 47' 51"

Results
	Winner	Claudio Chiappucci (ITA)	(Carrera Jeans–Tassoni)
	Second	Gianni Faresin (ITA)	(ZG Mobili)
	Third	Alberto Volpi (ITA)	(Mecair–Ballan)

The 1993 Clásica de San Sebastián was the 13th edition of the Clásica de San Sebastián cycle race and was held on 7 August 1993. The race started and finished in San Sebastián. The race was won by Claudio Chiappucci of the Carrera team.

== General classification ==
Final general classification

Rank	Rider	Team	Time
1	Claudio Chiappucci (ITA)	Carrera Jeans–Tassoni	5h 47' 51"
2	Gianni Faresin (ITA)	ZG Mobili	+ 2"
3	Alberto Volpi (ITA)	Mecair–Ballan	+ 24"
4	Iñaki Gastón (ESP)	CLAS–Cajastur	+ 24"
5	Marco Giovannetti (ITA)	Eldor–Viner	+ 24"
6	Bo André Namtvedt (NOR)	Subaru–Montgomery	+ 31"
7	Bruno Cornillet (FRA)	Novemail–Histor–Laser Computer	+ 31"
8	Maurizio Fondriest (ITA)	Lampre–Polti	+ 31"
9	Massimo Ghirotto (ITA)	ZG Mobili	+ 31"
10	Stefano Colagè (ITA)	ZG Mobili	+ 31"
