= 1988 Liège–Bastogne–Liège =

Race details
- Dates: 17 April 1988
- Stages: 1
- Distance: 260 km (160 mi)
- Winning time: 6h 42' 00"

Results
	Winner	Adri van der Poel (NED)	(PDM–Ultima–Concorde)
	Second	Michel Dernies (BEL)	(Lotto)
	Third	Robert Millar (GBR)	(Fagor–MBK)

The 1988 Liège–Bastogne–Liège was the 74th edition of the Liège–Bastogne–Liège cycle race and was held on 17 April 1988. The race started and finished in Liège. The race was won by Adri van der Poel of the PDM team.

== General classification ==
Final general classification

Rank	Rider	Team	Time
1	Adri van der Poel (NED)	PDM–Ultima–Concorde	6h 42' 00"
2	Michel Dernies (BEL)	Lotto	+ 0"
3	Robert Millar (GBR)	Fagor–MBK	+ 0"
4	Steven Rooks (NED)	PDM–Ultima–Concorde	+ 34"
5	Sean Kelly (IRL)	Kas–Canal 10	+ 45"
6	Luc Roosen (BEL)	Roland	+ 45"
7	Charly Mottet (FRA)	Système U–Gitane	+ 45"
8	Rolf Sørensen (DEN)	Ariostea–Gres	+ 45"
9	Phil Anderson (AUS)	TVM–Van Schilt	+ 45"
10	Martin Earley (IRL)	Kas–Canal 10	+ 45"
