= 1993 Dwars door België =

Race details
- Dates: 24 March 1993
- Stages: 1
- Distance: 200 km (124.3 mi)
- Winning time: 4h 59' 00"

Results
	Winner	Johan Museeuw (BEL)
	Second	Franco Ballerini (ITA)
	Third	Jo Planckaert (BEL)

The 1993 Dwars door België was the 48th edition of the Dwars door Vlaanderen cycle race and was held on 24 March 1993. The race started and finished in Waregem. The race was won by Johan Museeuw.

== General classification ==
Final general classification

Rank	Rider	Time
1	Johan Museeuw (BEL)	4h 59' 00"
2	Franco Ballerini (ITA)	+ 0"
3	Jo Planckaert (BEL)	+ 6"
4	Wilfried Peeters (BEL)	+ 6"
5	Johan Capiot (BEL)	+ 6"
6	Carlo Bomans (BEL)	+ 6"
7	Olaf Ludwig (GER)	+ 6"
8	Michel Cornelisse (NED)	+ 6"
9	Marc Sergeant (BEL)	+ 6"
10	Jean-Pierre Heynderickx (BEL)	+ 6"
