= 1994 Tour of Britain =

Race details
- Dates: 8–12 August 1994
- Stages: 5
- Winning time: 20h 54' 53"

Results
	Winner	Maurizio Fondriest (ITA)	(Lampre–Panaria)
	Second	Viatcheslav Ekimov (RUS)	(WordPerfect–Colnago–Decca)
	Third	Olaf Ludwig (GER)	(Team Telekom)

The 1994 Tour of Britain was the eighth edition of the Kellogg's Tour of Britain cycle race and was held from 8 August to 12 August 1994. The race started in Glasgow and finished in Manchester. The race was won by Maurizio Fondriest of the Lampre team.

== Route ==
Stage characteristics and winners
Stage	Date	Course	Distance	Type	Winner
1	8 August	Glasgow to Glasgow	207 km (128.6 mi)		Maurizio Fondriest (ITA)
2	9 August	Carlisle to Blackpool	182 km (113.1 mi)		Wiebren Veenstra (NED)
3a	10 August	Bolton	12.5 km (7.8 mi)	Individual time trial	Maurizio Fondriest (ITA)
3b	10 August	Liverpool to Liverpool	60 km (37.3 mi)		Andrei Tchmil (UKR)
4	11 August	Chester to Leicester	193 km (119.9 mi)	Hilly stage	Olaf Ludwig (GER)
5	12 August	Nottingham to Manchester	149 km (92.6 mi)		Ján Svorada (SVK)

== General classification ==
Final general classification

Rank	Rider	Team	Time
1	Maurizio Fondriest (ITA)	Lampre–Panaria	20h 54' 53"
2	Viatcheslav Ekimov (RUS)	WordPerfect–Colnago–Decca	+ 21"
3	Olaf Ludwig (GER)	Team Telekom	+ 27"
4	Ján Svorada (SVK)	Lampre–Panaria	+ 46"
5	Rolf Aldag (GER)	Team Telekom	+ 53"
6	Sean Yates (GBR)	Motorola	+ 55"
7	Alexander Gontchenkov (UKR)	Lampre–Panaria	+ 1' 02"
8	Norman Alvis (USA)	Motorola	+ 1' 04"
9	Frankie Andreu (USA)	Motorola	+ 1' 04"
10	Scott Sunderland (AUS)	TVM–Bison Kit	+ 1' 12"
