= Mauro-Antonio Santaromita =

Italian cyclist

Personal information
- Born: 18 September 1964 (age 62) Varese, Italy

Cycling career
- Sport: Cycling
- Current team: Retired
- Discipline: Road
- Role: Rider

Amateur team
- 1985: Magniflex

Professional teams
- 1986–1988: Magniflex–Centroscarpa
- 1989: Pepsi-Cola–Alba Cucine
- 1990–1992: Chateau d'Ax–Salotti
- 1993: Ariostea
- 1994: ZG Mobili
- 1995–1996: Gewiss–Ballan
- 1997: MG Maglificio–Technogym

Mauro-Antonio Santaromita (born 18 September 1964) is an Italian former racing cyclist. He rode in four editions of the Tour de France and ten editions of the Giro d'Italia.

His brother Ivan and son Alessandro are also professional cyclists.

== Major results ==
1984
3rd Giro d'Oro
1985
1st Giro del Montalbano
1987
4th Tour du Nord-Ouest
8th Overall Coors Classic
1989
1st Overall Giro del Trentino
1990
5th Rund um den Henninger Turm
9th Giro del Friuli
1993
9th Coppa Bernocchi
1995
4th Clásica de Sabiñánigo
7th Overall Hofbrau Cup
8th Giro dell'Etna
1997
1st Stage 2 (TTT) Hofbrau Cup

=== Grand Tour general classification results timeline ===
Grand Tour	1986	1987	1988	1989	1990	1991	1992	1993	1994	1995	1996	1997
Giro d'Italia	134	38	34	36	65	—	75	65	53	86	—	107
Tour de France	—	—	—	—	131	148	—	65	65	—	—	—
Vuelta a España	—	—	32	—	—	DNF	DNF	—	—	DNF	—	

Legend
—	Did not compete
DNF	Did not finish
