= 1994 Paris–Roubaix =

Race details
- Dates: April 10, 1994
- Stages: 1
- Distance: 270 km (170 mi)
- Winning time: 7h 28' 02"

Results
	Winner	Andrei Tchmil (MDA)	(Lotto)
	Second	Fabio Baldato (ITA)	(GB–MG Maglificio)
	Third	Franco Ballerini (ITA)	(Mapei–CLAS)

The 1994 Paris–Roubaix was the 92nd running of the Paris–Roubaix single-day cycling race, often known as the Hell of the North. It was held on 10 April 1994 over a distance of 270 kilometres (167.8 miles).

It was won by Andrei Tchmil, at the age of 31. It was his first and only victory in the "Hell of the North". Tchmil won alone, with an advantage of more than a minute in front of Italians Fabio Baldato and Franco Ballerini, who rounded out the podium. The winner of the previous edition, Gilbert Duclos-Lassalle, was only 7th now.

It was also the last edition to include the 4 star pavé sector Vendeville (sector number 6 in this edition), where the conditions were extremely wet and muddy. Whilst in the chasing group with the other favourites, behind Tchmil, both Ballerini and Duclos-Lasalle suffered rear wheel punctures. The conditions were so challenging that both men were forced to carry on cycling with punctures for minutes before a neutral service moto could reach them.

== Results ==
10-04-1994: Compiègne–Roubaix, 270 km.

Results (1–10)
	Cyclist	Team	Time
1	Andrei Tchmil (MDA)	Lotto	7h 28" 02'
2	Fabio Baldato (ITA)	GB–MG Maglificio	+ 1' 13"
3	Franco Ballerini (ITA)	Mapei–CLAS	+ 1' 13"
4	Olaf Ludwig (GER)	Team Telekom	+ 1' 26"
5	Sean Yates (GBR)	Motorola	+ 1' 26"
6	Johan Capiot (BEL)	TVM–Bison Kit	+ 1' 26"
7	Gilbert Duclos-Lassalle (FRA)	GAN	+ 1' 26"
8	Ludwig Willems (BEL)	GB–MG Maglificio	+ 1' 31"
9	Frankie Andreu (USA)	Motorola	+ 4' 14"
10	Nico Verhoeven (NED)	Novemail–Histor–Laser Computer	+ 4' 14"
