= 1993 La Flèche Wallonne =

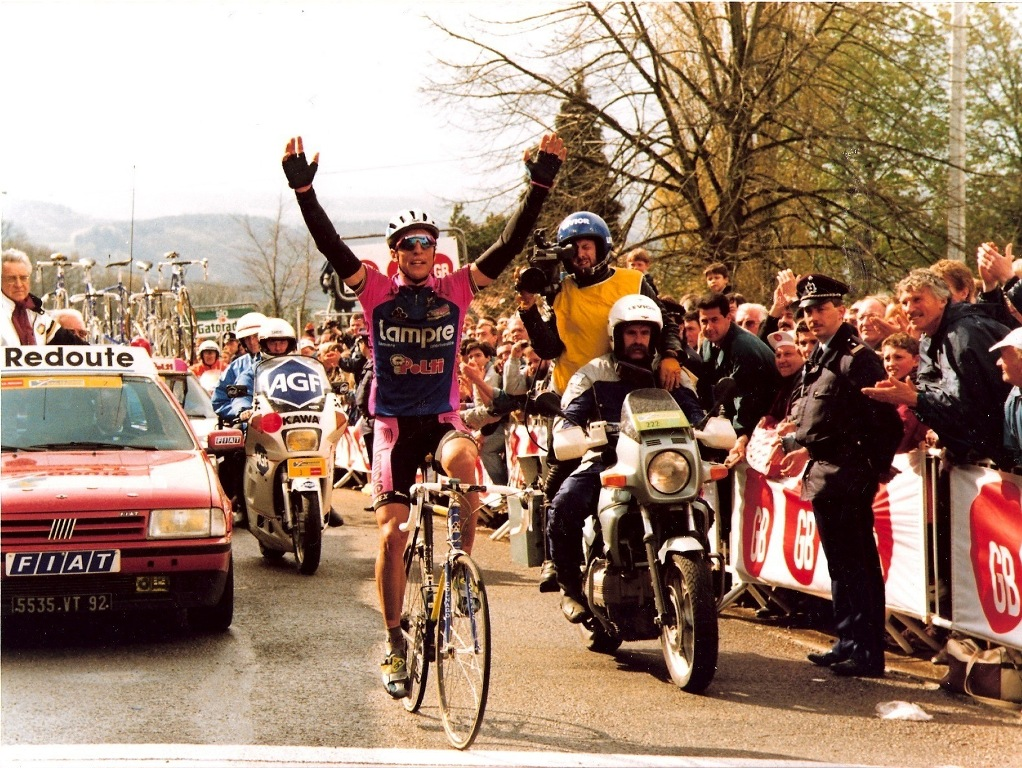

Race details
- Dates: 14 April 1993
- Stages: 1
- Distance: 206 km (128 mi)
- Winning time: 5h 18' 00"

Results
	Winner	Maurizio Fondriest (ITA)	(Lampre–Polti)
	Second	Gérard Rué (FRA)	(Banesto)
	Third	Davide Cassani (ITA)	(Ariostea)

The 1993 La Flèche Wallonne was the 57th edition of La Flèche Wallonne cycle race and was held on 14 April 1993. The race started in Spa and finished in Huy. Of the 164 riders who started, 96 reached the finish line. The race was won by Maurizio Fondriest of the Lampre team.

== General classification ==
Final general classification

Rank	Rider	Team	Time
1	Maurizio Fondriest (ITA)	Lampre–Polti	5h 18' 00"
2	Gérard Rué (FRA)	Banesto	+ 56"
3	Claudio Chiappucci (ITA)	Carrera Jeans–Tassoni	+ 1' 01"
4	Erik Breukink (NED)	ONCE	+ 1' 08"
5	Andrea Chiurato (ITA)	Gatorade–Mega Drive–Kenwood	+ 1' 25"
6	Rolf Sørensen (DEN)	Carrera Jeans–Tassoni	+ 2' 25"
7	Michele Bartoli (ITA)	Mercatone Uno–Zucchini–Medeghini	+ 2' 25"
8	Gert-Jan Theunisse (NED)	TVM–Bison Kit	+ 2' 59"
9	Ramón González Arrieta (ESP)	Festina–Lotus	+ 3' 08"
10	Serge Baguet (BEL)	Lotto	+ 3' 08"
