= El Diablo (nickname) =

El Diablo, Spanish for "the Devil", is a nickname of the following:

- Cristián Bejarano (born 1981), Mexican boxer
- Claudio Chiappucci (born 1963), Italian former cyclist
- Joël Despaigne (born 1966), Cuban retired volleyball player
- Marco Etcheverry (born 1970), Bolivian retired footballer
- José Antonio Fernández (born 1954), Mexican businessman
- Angel Manfredy (born 1974), Puerto Rican former boxer
- Luis Ernesto Michel (born 1979), Mexican football goalkeeper
- Claudio Núñez (born 1975), Chilean retired footballer
- Didi Senft (born 1952), German cyclist and inventor
- Wells Thompson (born 1983), American soccer player
- Willie Wells (1906–1989), American baseball player in the Negro leagues
- Fabio Quartararo (1999-), French Motorcycle racer

== See also ==
- Frank Varey (1908–1988), English speedway rider nicknamed "El Diablo Rojo" ("The Red Devil")
- Krzysztof Włodarczyk (born 1981), Polish boxer nicknamed "Diablo"
