= 1995 Omloop Het Volk =

Race details
- Dates: 25 February 1995
- Stages: 1
- Distance: 205 km (127 mi)
- Winning time: 5h 08' 38"

Results
	Winner	Franco Ballerini (ITA)
	Second	Edwig Van Hooydonck (BEL)
	Third	Andrei Tchmil (UKR)

The 1995 Omloop Het Volk was the 49th edition of the Omloop Het Volk cycle race and was held on 25 February 1995. The race started and finished in Ghent. The race was won by Franco Ballerini.

== General classification ==
Final general classification
Rank	Rider	Time
1	Franco Ballerini (ITA)	5h 08' 38"
2	Edwig Van Hooydonck (BEL)	+ 6"
3	Andrei Tchmil (UKR)	+ 6"
4	Wilfried Nelissen (BEL)	+ 23"
5	Jelle Nijdam (NED)	+ 23"
6	Johan Museeuw (BEL)	+ 23"
7	Mario Manzoni (ITA)	+ 23"
8	Hendrik Redant (BEL)	+ 23"
9	Jo Planckaert (BEL)	+ 23"
10	Gianluca Pianegonda (ITA)	+ 23"
