= 1990 Tour of Britain =

Race details
- Dates: 31 July–5 August 1990
- Stages: 6
- Winning time: 29h 11' 20"

Results
	Winner	Michel Dernies (BEL)	(Weinmann–SMM–Uster)
	Second	Robert Millar (GBR)	(Z–Tomasso)
	Third	Maurizio Fondriest (ITA)	(Del Tongo)
	Points	Maurizio Fondriest (ITA)	(Del Tongo)
	Mountains	Robert Millar (GBR)	(Z–Tomasso)
	Team	Toshiba	

The 1990 Tour of Britain was the fourth edition of the Kellogg's Tour of Britain cycle race and was held from 31 July to 5 August 1990. The race started in Brighton and finished in Manchester. The race was won by Michel Dernies of the Weinmann team.

== Route ==
Stage characteristics and winners
Stage	Date	Course	Distance	Type	Winner
1	31 July	Brighton to Bath	209 km (129.9 mi)		Malcolm Elliott (GBR)
2	1 August	Cardiff to Birmingham	198 km (123.0 mi)		Andrea Tafi (ITA)
3	2 August	Birmingham to Sheffield	156 km (96.9 mi)	Hilly stage	Michel Dernies (BEL)
4	3 August	Sheffield to Hull	143 km (88.9 mi)		Søren Lilholt (DEN)
5	4 August	Bridlington to Newcastle	180 km (111.8 mi)		Gianluca Bortolami (ITA)
6	5 August	York to Manchester	204 km (126.8 mi)		Maurizio Fondriest (ITA)

== General classification ==
Final general classification

Rank	Rider	Team	Time
1	Michel Dernies (BEL)	Weinmann–SMM–Uster	29h 11' 20"
2	Robert Millar (GBR)	Z–Tomasso	+ 4"
3	Maurizio Fondriest (ITA)	Del Tongo	+ 1' 38"
4	Federico Echave (ESP)	CLAS–Cajastur	+ 1' 56"
5	Jörg Müller (SUI)	TVM	+ 2' 03"
6	Emanuele Bombini (ITA)	Diana–Colnago–Animex	+ 2' 03"
7	Leonardo Sierra (VEN)	Selle Italia–Eurocar	+ 2' 37"
8	Martial Gayant (FRA)	Toshiba	+ 2' 54"
9	Laurent Jalabert (FRA)	Toshiba	+ 3' 14"
10	Phil Anderson (AUS)	TVM	+ 3' 19"
