= 1993 Tour of Flanders =

Tour of Flanders
1993 UCI Road World Cup, race 2 of 11
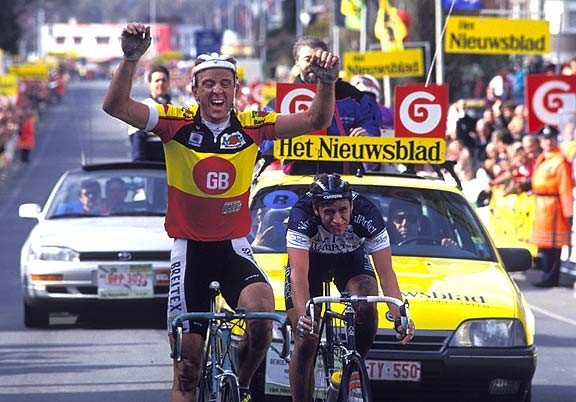
- Museeuw finishing first in the 1993 Tour of Flanders

Race details
- Dates: 4 April 1993
- Stages: 1
- Distance: 263 km (163.4 mi)
- Winning time: 6h 33' 00"

Results
	Winner	Johan Museeuw (BEL)	(GB-MG)
	Second	Frans Maassen (NED)	(WordPerfect)
	Third	Dario Bottaro (ITA)	(Lotto)

The 77th running of the Tour of Flanders cycling race in Belgium was held on Sunday 4 April 1993.

It was the second leg of the 1993 UCI Road World Cup. Belgian Johan Museeuw won his first Tour of Flanders in a two-man sprint against Frans Maassen. The race started in Sint-Niklaas and finished in Meerbeke (Ninove).

== Race Summary ==
At 68 km from the finish, eight riders broke away, with twofold winner Edwig Van Hooydonck and Belgian national champion Johan Museeuw at the front. Museeuw attacked on Tenbosse climb, followed by Dutchman Frans Maassen. Maassen, considered the slower sprinter, refused to work after the Muur van Geraardsbergen. Museeuw and Maassen stayed ahead, with Museeuw controlling the sprint and taking his first win in the World Cup race. Dario Bottaro won the sprint for third.

== Climbs ==
There were 16 categorized climbs:

- Tiegemberg
- Kluisberg
- Knokteberg
- Oude Kwaremont
- Paterberg
- Hoogberg-Hotond
- Kruisberg
- Bossenaarberg
- Eikenberg
- Volkegemberg
- Varent
- Leberg
- Molenberg (Zwalm)
- Berendries
- Muur-Kapelmuur
- Bosberg

== Results ==
	Rider	Team	Time
1	Johan Museeuw (BEL)	GB–MG Maglificio	6h 33' 00"
2	Frans Maassen (NED)	WordPerfect–Colnago–Decca	s.t.
3	Dario Bottaro (ITA)	Mecair–Ballan	+ 22"
4	Marc Sergeant (BEL)	Novemail–Histor–Laser Computer	+ 33"
5	Max Sciandri (ITA)	Motorola	+ 46"
6	Franco Ballerini (ITA)	GB–MG Maglificio	s.t.
7	Edwig Van Hooydonck (BEL)	WordPerfect–Colnago–Decca	s.t.
8	Maurizio Fondriest (ITA)	Lampre–Polti	s.t.
9	Olaf Ludwig (GER)	Team Telekom	+ 1' 03"
10	Johan Capiot (BEL)	TVM–Bison Kit	s.t.
