= 1993 Liège–Bastogne–Liège =

Race details
- Dates: 18 April 1993
- Stages: 1
- Distance: 261 km (162 mi)
- Winning time: 7h 14' 08"

Results
	Winner	Rolf Sørensen (DEN)	(Carrera Jeans–Tassoni)
	Second	Tony Rominger (SUI)	(CLAS–Cajastur)
	Third	Maurizio Fondriest (ITA)	(Lampre–Polti)

The 1993 Liège–Bastogne–Liège was the 79th edition of the Liège–Bastogne–Liège cycle race and was held on 18 April 1993. The race started in Liège and finished in Ans. The race was won by Rolf Sørensen of the Carrera team.

== General classification ==
Final general classification

Rank	Rider	Team	Time
1	Rolf Sørensen (DEN)	Carrera Jeans–Tassoni	7h 14' 08"
2	Tony Rominger (SUI)	CLAS–Cajastur	+ 1"
3	Maurizio Fondriest (ITA)	Lampre–Polti	+ 21"
4	Jan Nevens (BEL)	Lotto	+ 21"
5	Moreno Argentin (ITA)	Mecair–Ballan	+ 37"
6	Claudio Chiappucci (ITA)	Carrera Jeans–Tassoni	+ 1' 05"
7	Giorgio Furlan (ITA)	Ariostea	+ 1' 05"
8	Viatcheslav Ekimov (RUS)	Novemail–Histor–Laser Computer	+ 1' 43"
9	Laurent Jalabert (FRA)	ONCE	+ 1' 43"
10	Steven Rooks (NED)	Festina–Lotus	+ 1' 43"
