= 1993 Giro di Lombardia =

Race details
- Dates: 9 October 1993
- Stages: 1
- Distance: 242 km (150.4 mi)
- Winning time: 6h 04' 38"

Results
	Winner	Pascal Richard (SUI)	(Ariostea)
	Second	Giorgio Furlan (ITA)	(Ariostea)
	Third	Max Sciandri (GBR)	(Motorola)

The 1993 Giro di Lombardia was the 87th edition of the Giro di Lombardia cycle race and was held on 9 October 1993. The race started and finished in Monza. The race was won by Pascal Richard of the Ariostea team.

== General classification ==
Final general classification

Rank	Rider	Team	Time
1	Pascal Richard (SUI)	Ariostea	6h 04' 38"
2	Giorgio Furlan (ITA)	Ariostea	+ 0"
3	Max Sciandri (ITA)	Motorola	+ 7"
4	Claudio Chiappucci (ITA)	Carrera Jeans–Tassoni	+ 7"
5	Charly Mottet (FRA)	Novemail–Histor–Laser Computer	+ 1' 03"
6	Jesper Skibby (DEN)	TVM–Bison Kit	+ 1' 03"
7	Piotr Ugrumov (LAT)	Mecair–Ballan	+ 1' 03"
8	Massimo Podenzana (ITA)	Navigare–Blue Storm	+ 1' 03"
9	Dimitri Konyshev (RUS)	Jolly Componibili–Club 88	+ 1' 14"
10	Viatcheslav Ekimov (RUS)	Novemail–Histor–Laser Computer	+ 1' 19"
