= 1993 Milan–San Remo =

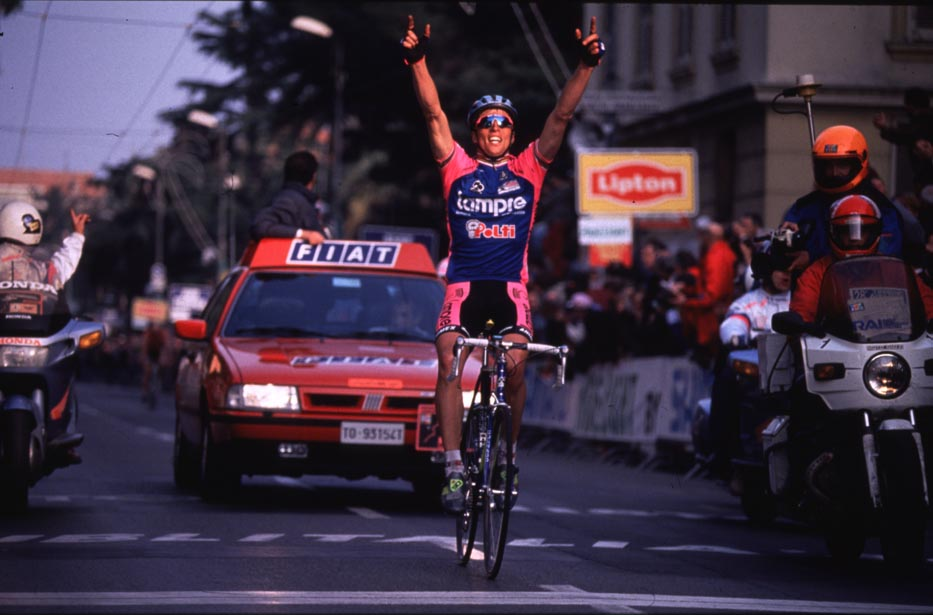

Race details
- Dates: 20 March 1993
- Stages: 1
- Distance: 297 km (185 mi)
- Winning time: 7h 25' 37"

Results
	Winner	Maurizio Fondriest (ITA)	(Lampre–Polti)
	Second	Luca Gelfi (ITA)	(Mapei–Viner)
	Third	Max Sciandri (ITA)	(Motorola)

The 1993 Milan–San Remo was the 84th edition of the Milan–San Remo cycle race and was held on 20 March 1993. The race started in Milan and finished in San Remo. The race was won by Maurizio Fondriest of the Lampre team.

== General classification ==
Final general classification

Rank	Rider	Team	Time
1	Maurizio Fondriest (ITA)	Lampre–Polti	7h 25' 37"
2	Luca Gelfi (ITA)	Mapei–Viner	+ 4"
3	Max Sciandri (ITA)	Motorola	+ 9"
4	Laurent Jalabert (FRA)	ONCE	+ 9"
5	Rolf Sørensen (DEN)	Carrera Jeans–Tassoni	+ 9"
6	Giorgio Furlan (ITA)	Ariostea	+ 9"
7	Franco Ballerini (ITA)	GB–MG Maglificio	+ 9"
8	Jean-Claude Colotti (FRA)	GAN	+ 9"
9	Davide Cassani (ITA)	Ariostea	+ 9"
10	Mario Cipollini (ITA)	GB–MG Maglificio	+ 9"
