= 1995 Tirreno–Adriatico =

Race details
- Dates: 8–15 March 1995
- Stages: 8
- Distance: 1,412 km (877.4 mi)
- Winning time: 37h 35' 39"

Results
	Winner	Stefano Colagè (ITA)	(ZG Mobili–Selle Italia)
	Second	Maurizio Fondriest (ITA)	(Lampre–Panaria)
	Third	Dimitri Konyshev (RUS)	(Aki–Gipiemme)

The 1995 Tirreno–Adriatico was the 30th edition of the Tirreno–Adriatico cycle race and was held from 8 March to 15 March 1995. The race started in San Giuseppe Vesuviano and finished in San Benedetto del Tronto. The race was won by Stefano Colagè of the ZG Mobili team.

== General classification ==
Final general classification

Rank	Rider	Team	Time
1	Stefano Colagè (ITA)	ZG Mobili–Selle Italia	37h 35' 39"
2	Maurizio Fondriest (ITA)	Lampre–Panaria	+ 22"
3	Dimitri Konyshev (RUS)	Aki–Gipiemme	+ 27"
4	Davide Rebellin (ITA)	MG Maglificio–Technogym	+ 29"
5	Michele Coppolillo (ITA)	Navigare–Blue Storm	+ 43"
6	Gabriele Colombo (ITA)	Gewiss–Ballan	+ 49"
7	Massimiliano Lelli (ITA)	Mercatone Uno–Saeco	+ 52"
8	Simone Borgheresi (ITA)	Amore & Vita–Galatron	+ 57"
9	Beat Zberg (SUI)	Carrera Jeans–Tassoni	+ 1' 01"
10	Luca Gelfi (ITA)	Brescialat–Fago	+ 1' 01"
