= 1993 Paris–Roubaix =

Race details
- Dates: April 11, 1993
- Stages: 1
- Distance: 267 km (166 mi)
- Winning time: 6h 25' 20"

Results
	Winner	Gilbert Duclos-Lassalle (FRA)	(GAN)
	Second	Franco Ballerini (ITA)	(GB–MG Maglificio)
	Third	Olaf Ludwig (GER)	(Team Telekom)

The 1993 Paris–Roubaix was the 91st running of the Paris–Roubaix single-day cycling race. It was held on 11 April 1993 over a distance of 267 kilometres (165.9 miles). 137 riders started the race, with only 69 finishing. Duclos-Lassalle won his second consecutive title, beating Ballerini with a bikethrow in the final sprint at the velodrome.

== Results ==
	Rider	Team	Time
1	Gilbert Duclos-Lassalle (FRA)	GAN	6h 25' 20"
2	Franco Ballerini (ITA)	GB–MG Maglificio	s.t.
3	Olaf Ludwig (GER)	Team Telekom	+ 2' 09"
4	Johan Museeuw (BEL)	GB–MG Maglificio	s.t.
5	Adrie van der Poel (NED)	Mercatone Uno–Zucchini–Medeghini	s.t.
6	Edwig Van Hooydonck (BEL)	WordPerfect–Colnago–Decca	s.t.
7	Marc Sergeant (BEL)	Novemail–Histor–Laser Computer	s.t.
8	Sean Yates (GBR)	Motorola	s.t.
9	Benjamin Van Itterbeeck (BEL)	Collstrop–Assur Carpets	s.t.
10	Wilfried Nelissen (BEL)	Novemail–Histor–Laser Computer	+ 3' 50"
