= Dario Bottaro =

Italian cyclist

Personal information
- Born: 5 November 1966 (age 59) Cartura, Italy

Cycling career
- Sport: Cycling
- Discipline: Road
- Role: Rider

Professional teams
- 1990–1991: Gis Gelati
- 1992: Mercatone Uno–Medeghini–Zucchini
- 1993–1996: Mecair–Ballan
- 1997: Mercatone Uno

Dario Bottaro (born 5 November 1966) is an Italian former professional racing cyclist. He rode in three editions of the Tour de France, three editions of the Giro d'Italia and one edition of the Vuelta a España.

== Major results ==
1987
1st Giro del Medio Brenta
1988
3rd Giro del Medio Brenta
3rd Gran Premio Palio del Recioto
1989
1st Trofeo Città di San Vendemiano
3rd Gran Premio Sportivi di Poggiana
1992
1st Stage 8 Grand Prix Guillaume Tell
3rd New Jersey Classic
8th Giro dell'Emilia
1993
3rd Tour of Flanders
8th Giro dell'Emilia
1994
3rd Overall Ronde van Nederland

1st Stage 3b

3rd First Union Invitational
1995
1st Stage 3 Tour de France (TTT)
