= Franco Ballerini =

Italian cyclist (1964–2010)

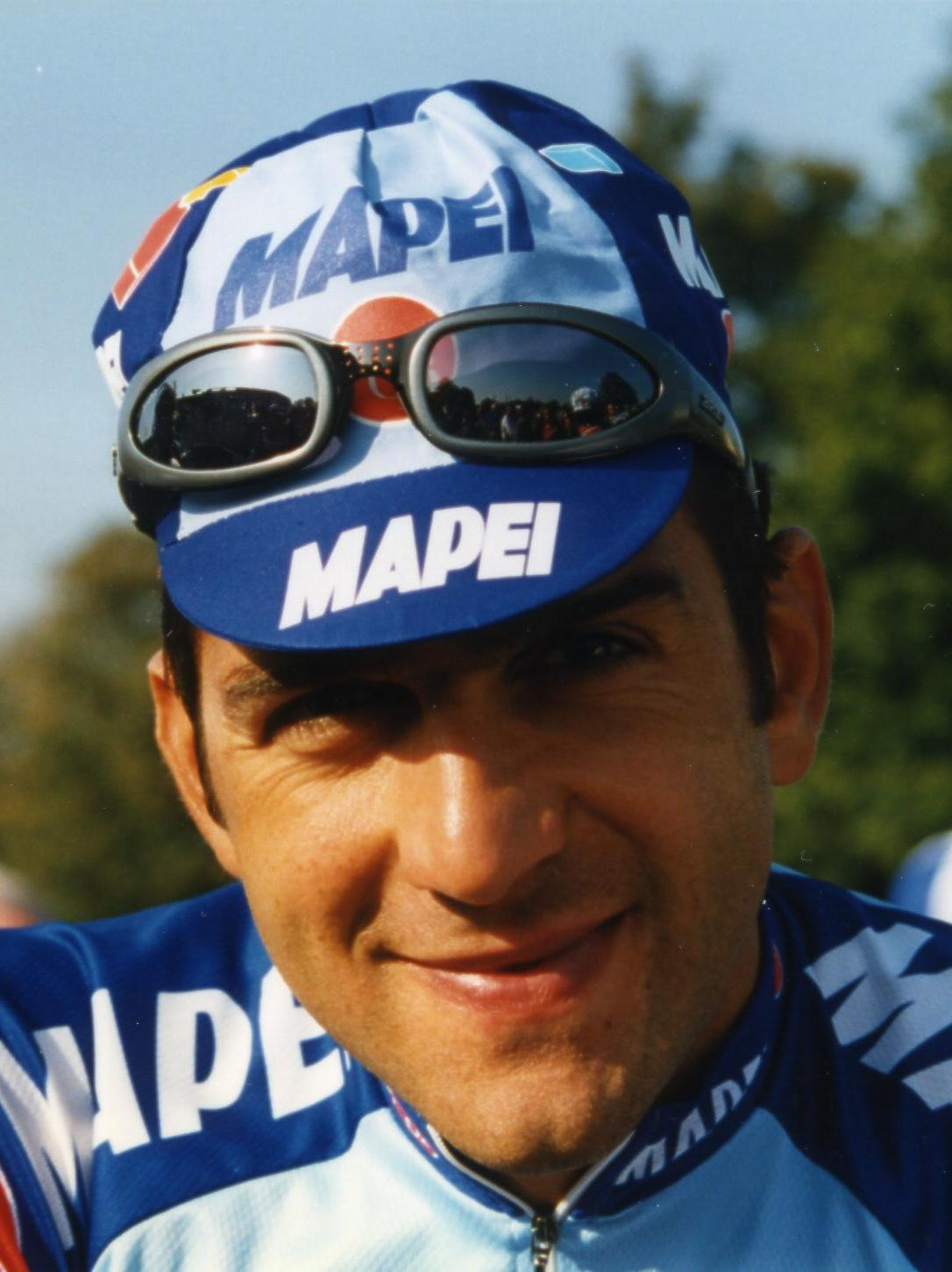
- Ballerini at the 1993 Tour de France

Personal information
- Full name: Franco Ballerini
- Born: 11 December 1964 Florence, Italy
- Died: 7 February 2010 (aged 45) Pistoia, Italy

Cycling career
- Sport: Cycling
- Discipline: Road
- Role: Rider

Professional teams
- 1986–1987: Magniflex–Centroscarpa
- 1988: Del Tongo
- 1989: Malvor–Sidi
- 1990–1991: Del Tongo
- 1992–1993: GB–MG Maglificio
- 1994–1998: Mapei–CLAS
- 1999–2000: Lampre–Daikin
- 2001: Mapei–Quick-Step

Major wins
- Grand Tours Giro d'Italia 1 individual stage (1991) One-day races and Classics Paris–Roubaix (1995, 1998) Omloop Het Volk (1995)

Franco Ballerini (11 December 1964 – 7 February 2010) was an Italian road racing cyclist.

Born in Florence, his greatest exploits as a rider came with his two victories in the cycling classic Paris–Roubaix, riding for the Mapei cycling team. In 1993 he was beaten on the line by Gilbert Duclos-Lassalle in an exciting Paris–Roubaix finale. Also on his palmarès or list of accomplishments there are other one-day races such as Omloop Het Volk and Paris–Brussels.

Ballerini then became manager of the Italian national cycling squad, winning the 2002 World Championships with Mario Cipollini and the 2004 Summer Olympics in Athens with ex-teammate Paolo Bettini. In 2006, 2007 and 2008 he won the World Championships with Paolo Bettini and Alessandro Ballan.

On 7 February 2010, Ballerini, a rallying fan, was mortally injured during a race in Larciano where he was participating as co-driver/navigator for professional driver Alessandro Ciardi. He died of his injuries at the Pistoia city hospital at the age of 45.

He was honored by race organizers in 2010.

== Doping ==
Months after finishing 3rd in the 1994 Paris–Roubaix it came out that Ballerini tested positive for Salbutamol, he was not sanctioned. In 1996 after the Grand Prix de Wallonie Ballerini tested positive again this time for Ephedrine, he received a 20 day suspension.

== Major results ==
1986
6th Trofeo Laigueglia
1987
1st Tre Valli Varesine
8th Trofeo Laigueglia
1988
1st Overall Cronostaffetta
5th Trofeo Masferrer
9th Giro dell'Umbria
1989
1st GP Città di Camaiore
2nd Giro di Campania
2nd Coppa Placci
10th Giro di Lombardia
1990
1st Giro di Campania
1st Paris–Brussels
1st Grand Prix des Amériques
1st Giro del Piemonte
2nd Trofeo Matteotti
3rd Gent–Wevelgem
3rd Giro del Veneto
3rd Millemetri del Corso di Mestre
5th Amstel Gold Race
7th Züri-Metzgete
1991
1st Stage 14 Giro d'Italia
1st Giro della Romagna
3rd Giro di Lombardia
5th Paris–Roubaix
5th Giro dell'Emilia
7th Overall Three Days of De Panne
8th Tour of Flanders
1992
2nd Giro di Campania
9th Tour of Flanders
1993
1st Stage 4 (TTT) Tour de France
2nd Paris–Roubaix
2nd Dwars door België
2nd Brabantse Pijl
3rd Coppa Bernocchi
6th Tour of Flanders
7th Milan–San Remo
10th Amstel Gold Race
1994
2nd Gent–Wevelgem
2nd Paris–Brussels
3rd Paris–Roubaix
4th Tour of Flanders
5th Tre Valli Varesine
1995
1st Paris–Roubaix
1st Omloop Het Volk
6th Brabantse Pijl
8th Overall Hofbrau Cup
1996
1st Grand Prix de Wallonie
3rd Overall Tour of Austria

1st Stage 5

5th Paris–Roubaix
5th Dwars door België
8th Coppa Bernocchi
8th Paris–Brussels
1997
3rd Tour of Flanders
6th Omloop Het Volk
1998
1st Paris–Roubaix
2nd Overall Tirreno–Adriatico
5th GP Industria & Artigianato di Larciano
5th Paris–Brussels
8th Tour of Flanders
1999
8th HEW Cyclassics
2000
4th Omloop Het Volk
8th Paris–Roubaix

=== Grand Tour general classification results timeline ===
Grand Tour	1987	1988	1989	1990	1991	1992	1993	1994	1995	1996	1997	1998
Vuelta a España	—	—	—	—	—	DNF	—	—	—	—	97	—
Giro d'Italia	124	—	—	109	DNF	—	—	—	—	—	—	—
Tour de France	—	—	—	—	—	115	61	—	—	—	—	DNF

Legend
—	Did not compete
DNF	Did not finish
