= Max Sciandri =

Italian-English cyclist

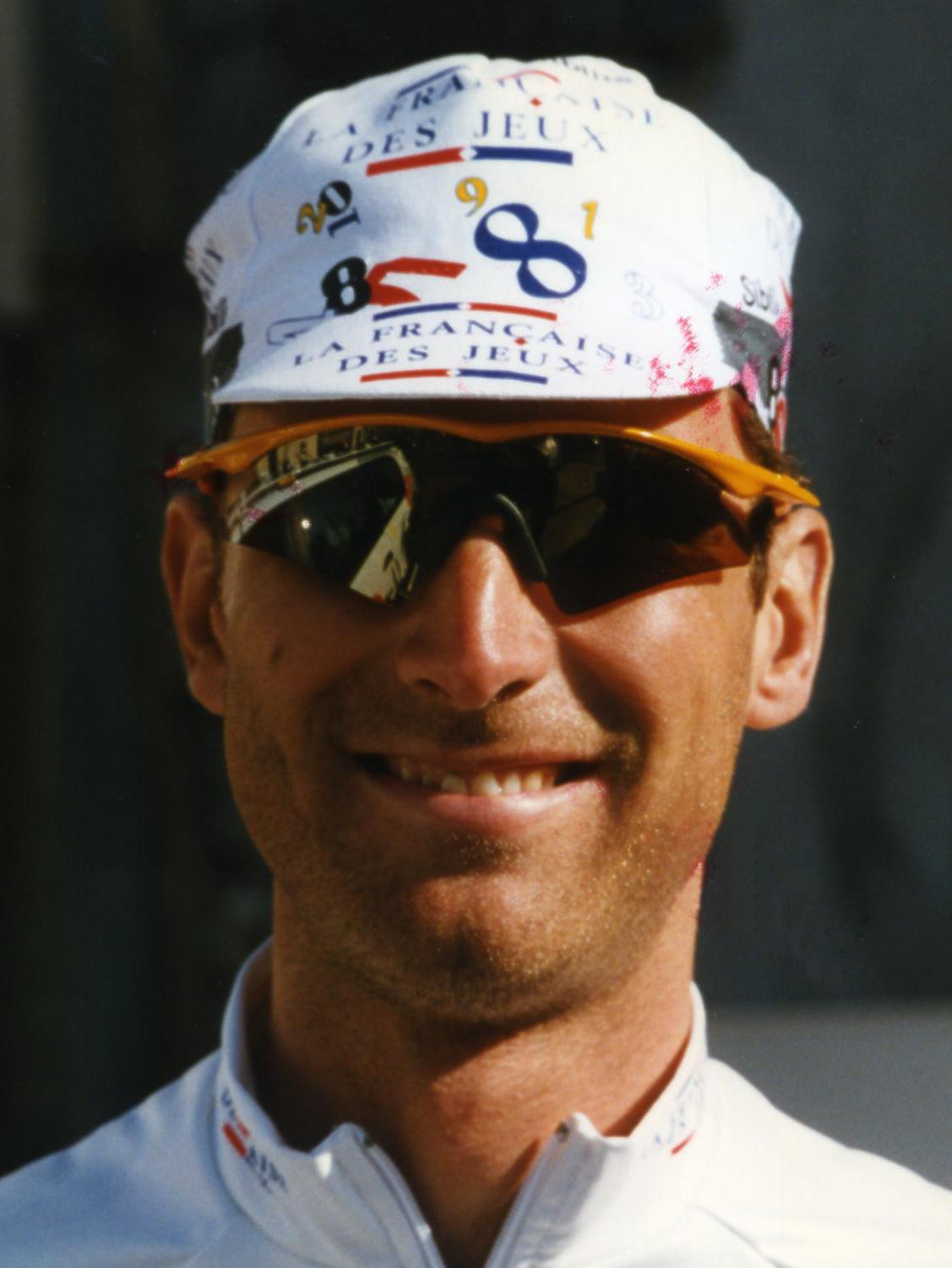
- Sciandri in 1997

Personal information
- Full name: Maximilian Sciandri
- Born: 15 February 1967 (age 59) Derby, England
- Height: 1.87 m (6 ft 2 in)
- Weight: 75 kg (165 lb)

Cycling career
- Sport: Cycling
- Current team: Retired
- Discipline: Road
- Role: Rider

Professional teams
- 1989: Viscontea-Titanbonifica
- 1990–1991: Carrera Jeans–Vagabond
- 1992–1993: Motorola
- 1994–1995: GB–MG Maglificio
- 1996: Motorola
- 1997–1999: Française des Jeux
- 2000: Linda McCartney Racing Team
- 2001–2003: Lampre–Daikin
- 2004: Team CSC

Managerial teams
- 2011–2018: BMC Racing Team
- 2019–: Movistar Team

Major wins
- Grand Tours Tour de France 1 individual stage (1995) Giro d'Italia 3 individual stages (1991, 1992, 1994) Stage races Tour of Britain (1992) One-day races and classics Giro della Romagna (1989, 1990) Wincanton Classic (1995) Giro del Lazio (2000)
Medal record
Men's road bicycle racing
Representing Great Britain
Olympic Games
Bronze medal – third place	1996 Atlanta	Road race

Maximilian Sciandri (born 15 February 1967) is a retired British road racing cyclist of Italian descent. He competed as an Italian national up to February 1995, then took British citizenship. He won the bronze medal in the men's individual road race at the 1996 Summer Olympics in Atlanta, USA. He was a professional rider from 1989 to 2004. Sciandri subsequently worked for the BMC Racing Team as a Directeur sportif from 2011 to 2018, having previously ridden for team manager Jim Ochowicz at the Motorola team in the 1990s. Prior to joining BMC he worked with British Cycling, helping to establish their base in Quarrata, and developing riders such as Mark Cavendish and Geraint Thomas. In October 2018 it emerged that Sciandri would join the Movistar Team as a directeur sportif from the 2019 season.

== Major results ==
1989
1st Giro della Romagna
2nd Giro del Lazio
1990
Vuelta a Aragón

1st Stages 2, 3a, 4, 5 & 6

1st Giro della Romagna
1st Grand Prix Pino Cerami
3rd Overall Tour de Luxembourg
1991
1st Stage 11 Giro d'Italia
3rd Overall Three Days of De Panne

1st Stage 1a

3rd Overall Settimana Siciliana
1992
1st Overall Kellogg's Tour

1st Stage 2

1st Stage 3 Giro d'Italia
1st Stage 5 Tour de Romandie
2nd Paris–Camembert
1993
1st Overall Tour de Luxembourg

1st Stages 1 & 2

1st Giro del Veneto
1st Grand Prix de Fourmies
1st Coppa Placci
1st Stage 2 Settimana Sciliana
3rd UCI Road World Cup
3rd Milan–San Remo
3rd Giro di Lombardia
5th Tour of Flanders
5th Amstel Gold Race
1994
1st Stage 16 Giro d'Italia
1st Stage 4 Giro del Trentino
2nd Giro del Lazio
7th Liège–Bastogne–Liège
8th Gent–Wevelgem
1995
1st Stage 11 Tour de France
1st Leeds International Classic
1st Grand Prix de Fourmies
1st Stage 2 Tirreno–Adriatico
1st Stage 3a Three Days of De Panne
7th Clásica de San Sebastián
8th UCI Road World Cup
9th Tour of Flanders
1996
1st Stage 8 Paris–Nice
2nd Leeds International Classic
3rd Road race, Olympic Games
4th Milan–San Remo
4th Giro del Veneto
1997
2nd Paris–Tours
2nd GP Industria & Artigianato di Larciano
2nd Gran Premio Industria e Commercio di Prato
2nd Gran Premio Città di Camaiore
5th Liège–Bastogne–Liège
6th Rochester International Classic
7th UCI Road World Cup
9th Brabantse Pijl
1998
Critérium du Dauphiné Libéré

1st Stages 1 & 5

3rd Tre Valli Varesine
6th Clásica de San Sebastián
1999
2nd Grand Prix de Fourmies
4th Coppa Sabatini
8th Clásica de San Sebastián
8th Milano–Torino
2000
1st Giro del Lazio
1st Stage 5 Rapport Tour
2001
4th Giro del Lazio
7th Tour of Flanders
7th Giro di Lombardia
7th Classic Haribo
