= 1993 Amstel Gold Race =

Dutch cycling race

The 1993 Amstel Gold Race was the 28th edition of the annual Amstel Gold Race road bicycle race, held on April 24, 1993, in the Dutch province of Limburg. The race stretched 249 kilometres, with the start in Heerlen and the finish in Maastricht. There were a total of 158 competitors, with 87 cyclists finishing the race.

== Results ==
	Rider	Team	Time
1	Rolf Järmann (SUI)	Ariostea	6h 40' 04"
2	Gianni Bugno (ITA)	Gatorade–Mega Drive–Kenwood	s.t.
3	Jens Heppner (GER)	Team Telekom	+ 1' 02"
4	Maurizio Fondriest (ITA)	Lampre–Polti	+ 1' 07"
5	Max Sciandri (ITA)	Motorola	s.t.
6	Adrie van der Poel (NED)	Mercatone Uno–Zucchini–Medeghini	s.t.
7	Davide Cassani (ITA)	Ariostea	s.t.
8	Gert-Jan Theunisse (NED)	TVM–Bison Kit	s.t.
9	Giorgio Furlan (ITA)	Ariostea	+ 2' 17"
10	Franco Ballerini (ITA)	GB–MG Maglificio	s.t.
