= Marco Saligari =

Italian cyclist and directeur sportif

Personal information
- Full name: Marco Saligari
- Born: 18 May 1965 (age 61) Sesto San Giovanni, Italy
- Height: 1.71 m (5 ft 7 1/2 in)
- Weight: 65 kg (143 lb; 10 st 3 lb)

Cycling career
- Sport: Cycling
- Current team: Landbouwkrediet–Colnago
- Discipline: Road
- Role: Directeur sportif

Professional teams
- 1987–1993: Ariostea–Gres
- 1994–1996: GB–MG Maglificio
- 1997–1998: Casino

Managerial team
- 2002–: Landbouwkrediet–Colnago

Major wins
- Giro d'Italia, 3 stages; Tour de Suisse (1993); Grand Prix d'Ouverture La Marseillaise (1998)

Marco Saligari (born 18 May 1965 in Sesto San Giovanni) is a directeur sportif and former Italian road bicycle racer who raced during the 1990s. Since 2002, Saligari has served as manager of the Landbouwkrediet (formerly Colnago-Landbouwkrediet) squad.

In a marathon breakaway, Saligari won stage 17 at the 1993 Giro d'Italia by escaping after only riding twelve kilometers of the 211 km stage. He finished alone atop the 1,815 meter climb of Valle Vairata after dropping countrymen Gianluca Bortolami and Mauro Santaromita with 38 km remaining.

== Major achievements ==
1992
1 stage, Giro d'Italia
1993
1st, Overall, Tour de Suisse
Stage 17, Giro d'Italia
1994
1 stage, Giro d'Italia
1 stage, Tour de Suisse
1996 – MG-Technogym
9th, Overall, Volta a Catalunya (and Stage 1 win)
72nd, Overall, Tour de France
1997 – Casino
95th, Overall, Tour de France
1998 – Casino C'est Votre Equipe
1st, Grand Prix d'Ouverture La Marseillaise
