= Claudio Chiappucci =

Italian cyclist (born 1963)

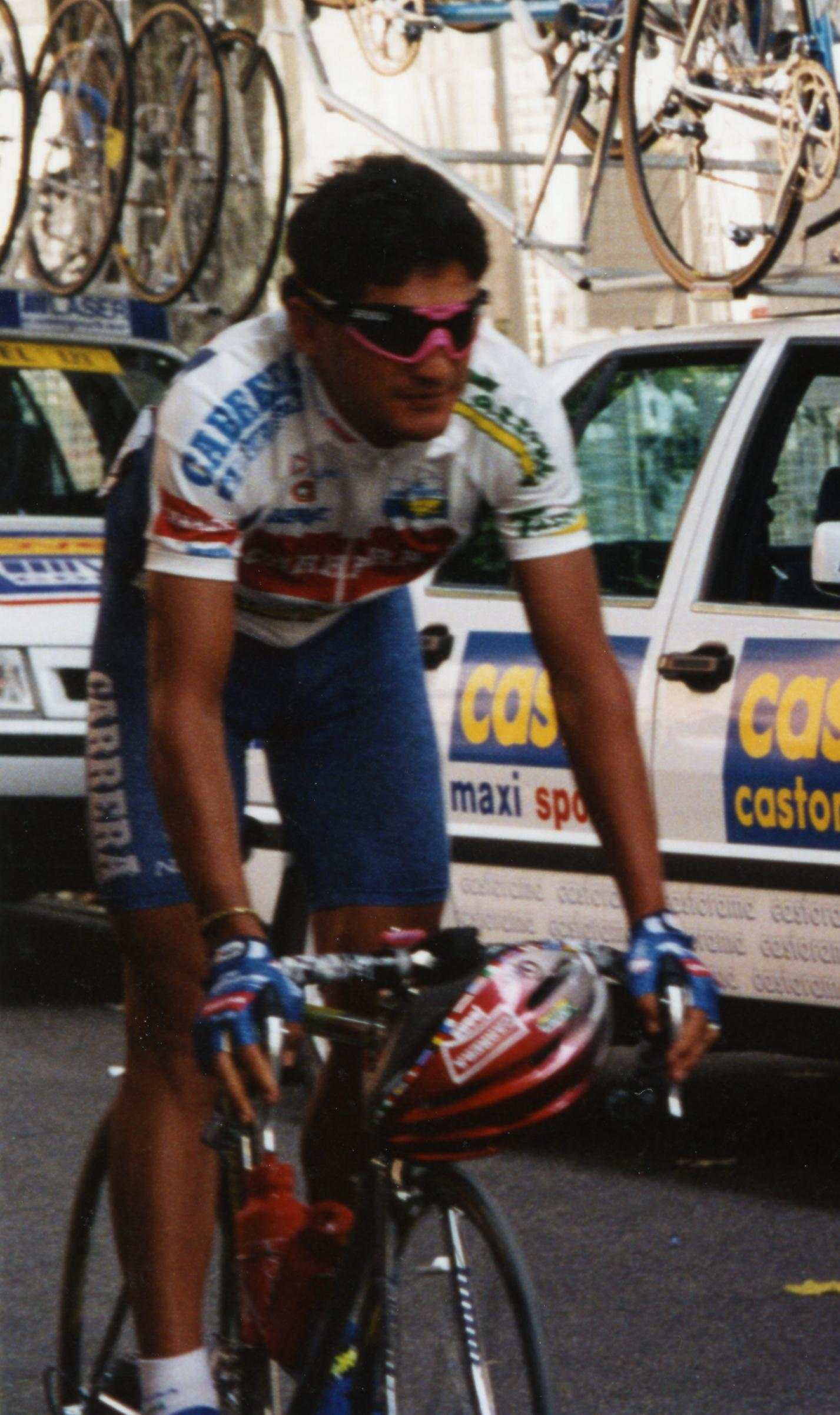
- Chiappucci at the 1993 Tour de France

Personal information
- Full name: Claudio Chiappucci
- Nickname: El Diablo
- Born: 28 February 1963 (age 63) Uboldo, Italy
- Height: 1.72 m (5 ft 8 in)
- Weight: 67 kg (148 lb)

Cycling career
- Sport: Cycling
- Discipline: Road
- Role: Rider
- Rider type: All-rounder

Professional teams
- 1985–1996: Carrera–Inoxpran
- 1997: Asics–CGA
- 1998–1999: Ros Mary–Amica Chips

Major wins
- Grand Tours Tour de France Mountains classification (1991, 1992) Combativity award (1991, 1992) 3 individual stages (1991, 1992, 1993) Giro d'Italia Points classification (1991) Mountains classification (1990, 1992, 1993) 1 individual stage (1993) Stage Races Tour of the Basque Country (1991) Volta a Catalunya (1994) Giro del Trentino (1992) One-Day Races and Classics Milan–San Remo (1991) Clásica de San Sebastián (1993) Giro del Piemonte (1989, 1995) Tre Valli Varesine (1994)
Medal record
Representing Italy
Men's road bicycle racing
World Championships
Silver medal – second place	1994 Agrigento	Elite Men's Road Race

Claudio Chiappucci (born 28 February 1963 in Uboldo, Varese, Lombardy) is a retired Italian professional cyclist. He was on the podium three times in the Tour de France general classification: second in 1990, third in 1991 and second again in 1992.

== Career ==
Although his family came from Tuscany, Chiappucci was born in Varese. He won the mountains classification at the 1990 Giro d'Italia and had made the decision to also aim for mountain points at the 1990 Tour de France; He would go on to win the polka dot jersey at three consecutive editions 1990-1992.

Competing in the 1990 Tour de France however, Chiappucci initially began having designs on wearing the yellow jersey after initiating a stage one attack saw him gain a 10-minute time advantage alongside companions Steve Bauer, Ronan Pensec and Frans Maassen. In subsequent stages, Bauer, Pensec and Chiappucci (from stage 12) took the overall lead, with Chiappucci the first Italian to wear the yellow jersey since Francesco Moser 15 years before. He resisted the defending champion Greg LeMond, only losing the lead of the race after stage 20, the final time trial. In the end, LeMond won the Tour by 2' 16", Chiappucci came home with a surprising second place and, moreover, the status of a cycling star. He was the first Italian cyclist to arrive on the podium at the Tour since Felice Gimondi in 1972. This first successful campaign highlighted Chiappucci's main weakness, the time trial. Although vowing to return the following year as a better racer against the clock, Chiappucci was never able to master this discipline.

The year 1991 confirmed to the cycling community that Chiappucci was able to perform consistently. Beginning with a win in the opening classic of the season, the 1991 Milan–San Remo on 23 March, his sixth professional win, clinched by 45 seconds from Dane Rolf Sørensen after riding away from him on the Poggio. It was a win he prepared for, training for twelve days in the new year across the five climbs that populate the final 60 km of the race, and on which he used a series of attacks to whittle away a leading group of eleven. Chiappucci rode the 1991 Giro d'Italia, placing second overall behind Franco Chioccioli, and winning the points Classification having placed in the top-ten in fifteen of the twenty one stages. In July, he stood on to the podium at the 1991 Tour de France in Paris, placing third overall and winning the king of the mountains competition. He also won Stage 13 to Val Louron in the Pyrenees, following attacks by Lemond and then Miguel Induráin, out-sprinting the Spaniard at the finish.

Chiappucci animated the 1992 Tour de France on multiple stages, winning the combativity award for the second consecutive year. In the first week, he was part of a breakaway with Greg Lemond that gained time on the Peloton in Brussels. He earned a famous victory on stage 13 of the Tour, when he attacked on the first climb of the day, 245 km from the finish, and arrived in Sestriere after holding off a thrilling chase by Miguel Induráin and Gianni Bugno. On that occasion, Pascal Lino was holding the yellow jersey, but it was one of the first major mountain stages and was anticipated to lose it to the GC contenders. Induráin, Roche, LeMond, Delgado, Bugno and Induráin were all ahead of Chiappucci, who was in 7th overall. Chiappucci risked everything by joining the early breakaway that no other GC riders were willing to enter. He dropped the other breakaway riders before the first summit and rode on a solo attack for 125 kilometres. He was alone on top of all five main climbs, of which 3 were "première catégorie" and 1 "hors catégorie". The attack was later described as "brave, to the point of insanity". By the end of the stage he had jumped to 2nd place overall about ninety seconds behind Induráin. His performance was redolent of the accomplishment of compatriot Fausto Coppi who had won on the mountain 40 years earlier in 1952, and who had served in the Italian army with Chiappucci's father in Africa.

After riding a solid Giro in 1993, it looked like his 1993 Tour de France was to be a big showdown with Miguel Induráin. But from the first mountain stage, Chiappucci was obviously struggling. Although he had a revival later on in the race, Chiappucci finished sixth overall. He won the Clásica de San Sebastián a few weeks after the Tour de France.

At the 1994 Tour de France, his hopes for a fourth podium finish ended when he lost 24 minutes on a single stage in the Pyrenees, having fallen sick. He finished the stage surrounded by five teammates who had escorted him up the mountain. Later that year, Chiappucci won the silver medal sandwiched between Frenchmen Luc Leblanc and Richard Virenque in the road race at the 1994 World Championship in Sicily.

Chiappucci rode his last race at the International Criterium of the Valencian Community on 7 November 1999, finishing second behind Abraham Olano.

Chiappucci was distinguished by a combative style, bringing flair and drama to races, initiating attacks and participating during breakaways, regardless of the specific terrain. Due to his attacking style he was nicknamed El Diablo. His time at the Carrera cycling team coincided with both Stephen Roche and Marco Pantani.

== Doping ==
Claudio Chiappucci used the services of doctor Francesco Conconi, who is accused of applying EPO to cyclists. Conconi was found 'morally guilty', but not convicted, because the statute of limitations had expired. The judge had looked at medical reports of 33 cyclists in the period from 1993 to 1995, including Chiappucci's, and all blood tests showed largely fluctuating hematocrit-values, indicative for EPO-use. In 1997, Chiappucci failed the UCI's haematocrit test twice. That year, he told prosecutor Vincenzo Scolastico that he had been using EPO since 1993, but later he retracted that statement.

== Career achievements ==
=== Major results ===
1982
1st Road race, National Amateur Road Championships
1984
2nd Piccolo Giro di Lombardia
1987
1st Stage 3 (TTT) Giro d'Italia
2nd Giro di Toscana
8th Paris–Tours
1988
2nd Trofeo Luis Puig
7th Gran Premio Città di Camaiore
9th Giro di Lombardia
1989
1st Giro del Piemonte
1st Coppa Placci
2nd Overall Giro del Trentino
3rd Rund um den Henninger Turm
6th Tre Valli Varesine
8th La Flèche Wallonne
1990
1st Mountains classification Giro d'Italia
1st Stage 4 Settimana Internazionale di Coppi e Bartali
2nd Overall Tour de France

Held after Stages 12–19

2nd Tre Valli Varesine
3rd Züri-Metzgete
3rd Giro del Friuli
4th Wincanton Classic
4th Grand Prix des Amériques
5th Overall Giro del Trentino
6th UCI Road World Cup
7th Overall Paris–Nice

1st Stage 6

1991
1st Overall Tour of the Basque Country

1st Stage 3

1st Milan–San Remo
Setmana Catalana de Ciclisme

1st Stages 4a & 4b

2nd Overall Giro d'Italia

1st Points classification

2nd Overall Vuelta a Murcia
3rd Overall Tour de France

1st Mountains classification
1st Stage 13
Combativity award Overall

3rd Road race, National Road Championships
3rd La Flèche Wallonne
3rd Giro dell'Appennino
3rd Giro del Friuli
4th Overall Giro del Trentino
4th Tre Valli Varesine
9th Wincanton Classic
1992
1st Overall Giro del Trentino

1st Stage 3

1st Giro dell'Appennino
1st Subida a Urkiola
2nd Overall Tour de France

1st Mountains classification
1st Stage 13
Combativity award Overall

2nd Overall Giro d'Italia

1st Mountains classification

2nd Overall Clásico RCN

1st Stage 1

2nd Giro di Lombardia
2nd Clásica de San Sebastián
2nd Coppa Placci
2nd Rund um den Henninger Turm
4th Wincanton Classic
7th UCI Road World Cup

1993

1st Clásica de San Sebastián
1st Japan Cup
1st Coppa Sabatini
1st Cronoscalata della Futa-Memorial Gastone Nencini
2nd Overall Tour de Romandie
2nd Overall Giro del Trentino
2nd Overall Escalada a Montjuïc
2nd GP du Canton d'Argovie
2nd Subida a Urkiola
2nd Giro del Friuli
3rd Overall Giro d'Italia

1st Mountains classification
1st Stage 14

3rd La Flèche Wallonne
3rd Giro dell'Emilia
3rd Giro del Veneto
4th Giro di Lombardia
4th Tre Valli Varesine
5th Overall Volta a Catalunya
5th UCI Road World Cup
6th Overall Tour de France

1st Stage 17

6th Liège–Bastogne–Liège
7th Züri-Metzgete
10th Overall Tour of the Basque Country
1994
1st Overall Volta a Catalunya

1st Stage 4

1st Tre Valli Varesine
1st Japan Cup
2nd Overall Tour of Galicia

1st Stage 3

2nd Overall Escalada a Montjuïc
2nd Road race, UCI Road World Championships
2nd Giro di Lombardia
2nd Subida a Urkiola
2nd Giro dell'Appennino
3rd Overall Tour of the Basque Country
4th UCI Road World Cup
4th Liège–Bastogne–Liège
4th Züri-Metzgete
5th Overall Giro d'Italia
5th Overall Critérium International
7th Overall Tirreno–Adriatico
7th Amstel Gold Race
7th La Flèche Wallonne
8th Giro dell'Emilia
8th Coppa Bernocchi
9th Overall Giro del Trentino
1995
1st Overall Escalada a Montjuïc

1st Stage 1a

1st Giro del Piemonte
1st Japan Cup
1st Cronoscalata della Futa-Memorial Gastone Nencini
3rd Subida a Urkiola
4th Overall Giro d'Italia
4th Tour of Flanders
6th Giro di Lombardia
7th Overall Tour de Romandie
7th Liège–Bastogne–Liège
8th Overall Vuelta a Murcia
8th Milan–San Remo
9th GP Ouest–France
1996
3rd GP Industria & Artigianato di Larciano
3rd Coppa Sabatini
3rd Grand Prix de Fourmies
10th GP Ouest–France
1997
2nd Overall Giro di Sardegna
2nd Overall Settimana Internazionale di Coppi e Bartali
6th Tour of Flanders
9th GP Ouest–France
10th Rund um den Henninger Turm
1998
8th Overall Tirreno–Adriatico
10th Coppa Placci

=== Grand Tour general classification results timeline ===
Grand Tour	1985	1986	1987	1988	1989	1990	1991	1992	1993	1994	1995	1996	1997	1998
Giro d'Italia	64	—	48	24	46	12	2	2	3	5	4	DNF	—	60
Tour de France	—	—	—	—	81	2	3	2	6	DNF	11	37	—	—
Vuelta a España	—	—	—	26	—	—	—	—	—	—	—	—	11	—

Legend
—	Did not compete
DNF	Did not finish

== See also ==
- List of doping cases in cycling
