= Luca Gelfi =

Italian cyclist

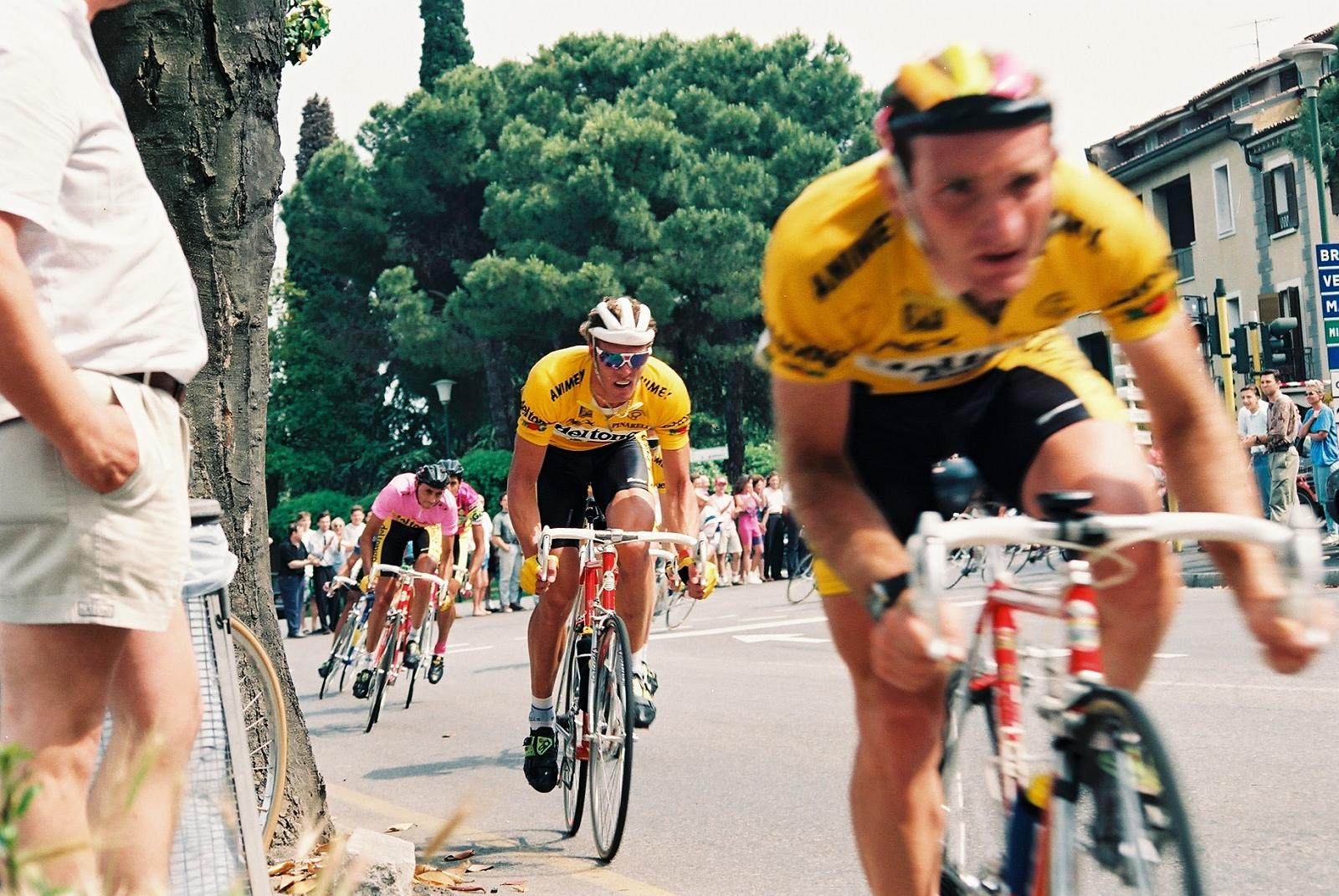
- Luca Gelfi in front of Mario Cipollini, Giro d'Italia 1991

Personal information
- Full name: Luca Gelfi
- Born: 21 June 1966 Seriate, Italy
- Died: 3 January 2009 (aged 42) Torre de Roveri, Italy

Cycling career
- Sport: Cycling
- Discipline: Road
- Role: Rider

Professional teams
- 1988–1991: Del Tongo
- 1992: GB–MG Maglificio
- 1993: Eldor–Viner
- 1994–1997: Brescialat–Ceramiche Refin
- 1998: Ros Mary–Amica Chips

Major wins
- Grand Tours Giro d'Italia 2 individual stages (1990)

Luca Gelfi (21 June 1966 – 3 January 2009) was an Italian racing cyclist. A professional from 1988 to 1998, he won two stages of the 1990 Giro d'Italia and one of the 1997 Volta a Portugal. He finished second in the 1993 Milan–San Remo.

After retiring in 1998, he owned and operated a bike shop and directed Team Fratelli Giorgi, a prestigious junior cycling team.

Gelfi was diagnosed with clinical depression and died from suicide by hanging in 2009.

== Major results ==
1988
1st Overall Cronostaffetta
4th Firenze–Pistoia
5th Overall Vuelta a Andalucía
8th Giro di Romagna
9th Overall Tirreno–Adriatico
1989
3rd Overall Giro del Trentino
5th Firenze–Pistoia
6th Overall Tour of Belgium
1990
Giro d'Italia

1st Stages 6 & 10 (ITT)

6th Giro di Toscana
10th G.P. Camaiore
1993
2nd Milan–San Remo
2nd Overall Giro di Puglia
1994
6th Overall Tour of the Basque Country
1995
3rd GP Industria & Artigianato di Larciano
4th Trofeo Laigueglia
5th Overall Tour Méditerranéen
8th Tre Valli Varesine
10th Overall Tirreno–Adriatico
1996
9th Overall Tirreno–Adriatico
1997
1st Stage 10 Volta a Portugal
8th Overall GP du Midi-Libre
10th Paris–Tours
10th Giro del Piemonte
1998
6th GP Industria & Artigianato di Larciano
10th Giro di Toscana
