= Maurizio Fondriest =

Italian cyclist (born 1965)

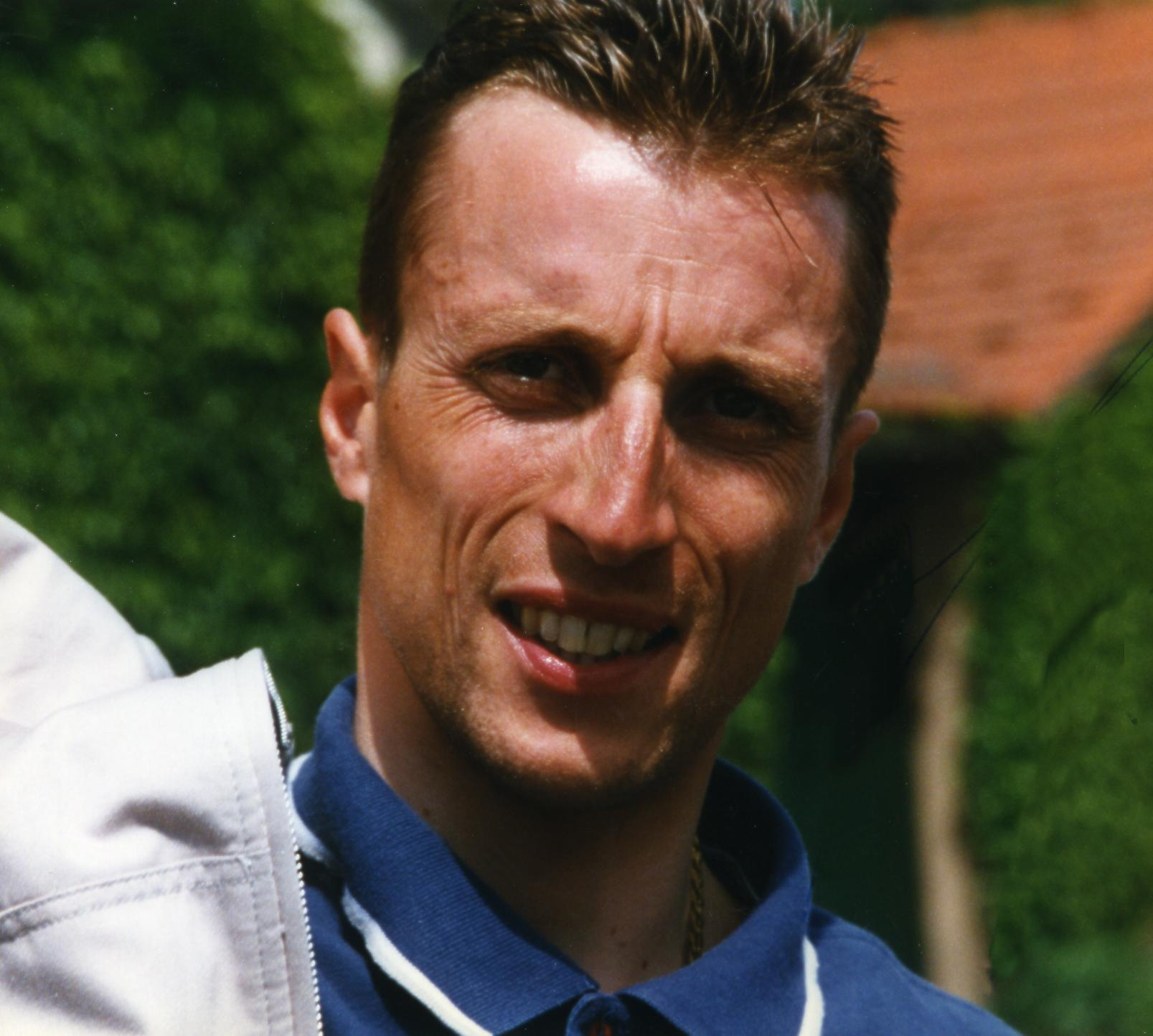
- Fondriest in 1997

Personal information
- Born: 15 January 1965 (age 61) Cles, Italy
- Height: 1.82 m (6 ft 0 in)
- Weight: 70 kg (154 lb)

Cycling career
- Sport: Cycling
- Discipline: Road
- Role: Rider

Amateur team
- 1985–1986: Zalf–Fior

Professional team
- 1987–1988: Alfa Lum
- 1989–1990: Del Tongo
- 1991–1992: Panasonic
- 1993–1995: Lampre
- 1996: Roslotto–ZG Mobili
- 1997–1998: Cofidis

Major wins
- Grand Tours Giro d'Italia 2 individual stages (1993, 1995) Stage Races Tirreno–Adriatico (1993) Tour de Pologne (1994) Giro del Trentino (1993) Tour of Britain (1994) One-Day Races and Classics World Road Race Championship (1988) Milan–San Remo (1993) La Flèche Wallonne (1993) Züri-Metzgete (1993) Giro dell'Emilia (1993) Others UCI Road World Cup (1991, 1993)
Medal record
Men's road bicycle racing
Representing Italy
World Championships
| Gold medal – first place | 1988 Ronse | Elite Men's Road Race |

Maurizio Fondriest (born 15 January 1965) is a retired Italian professional road racing cyclist. He won the road race at the 1988 World Cycling Championships, and the UCI Road World Cup in 1991 and 1993.

== Career ==
Born in Cles, Trentino, Fondriest turned professional in 1987 with the Ecoflam Team and that year had his first professional victory in Lerida during a stage of the Vuelta a Catalunya. He subsequently rode for Alfa-Lum in 1988. That year he also won stages in the Tour de Suisse and Tirreno–Adriatico and finished second behind Laurent Fignon at the 1988 Milan-San Remo.

Later that year, he won the 1988 World Cycling Championships in Rome at the age of 23 years-old, one of the youngest ever winners, taking advantage of a crash involving his breakaway companions Steve Bauer of Canada and Belgian Claude Criquielion.

In 1990 he won the Coppa Ugo Agostoni, after dropping illustrious compatriots Gianni Bugno and Claudio Chiappucci. He had a top-five finish at the 1990 Milan-San Remo and 1990 Tour of Flanders. He missed the Giro d'Italia that year with injury and his team opted out of the Tour de France but in August he placed third overall at the 1990 Tour of Britain, winning one stage but being active enough in others to win the points classification. Later that year he finished third in a small group behind Rolf Sørensen and Phil Anderson at the finish of Paris–Tours.

From 1991, he left Italy and began riding for Panasonic. He won the season-long UCI Road World Cup that year. Despite not winning any of the individual races, his performances included 2nd at the 1991 Amstel Gold Race behind Frans Maassen.

In 1993, riding for the Lampre team, he won Milan–San Remo, La Flèche Wallonne, the Züri-Metzgete, the Giro dell'Emilia, the general classification and two stages of Tirreno–Adriatico, three stages and the general classification of the Grand Prix du Midi Libre, a stage in the Giro d'Italia, and the overall World Cup.

While he never again had such a successful season, he had another successful season with Lampre in 1995: in that year he won a stage in the Giro d'Italia and came in second in twelve races including the Tirreno–Adriatico general classification, Milan–San Remo, Gent–Wevelgem, La Flèche Wallonne, and a stage in the Giro d'Italia.

Fondriest finished fourth in the individual time trial in Atlanta at the 1996 Olympic Games, the first Olympics open to professional riders. Although latterly troubled by back injuries, he finished his racing career with the French Cofidis team in 1997 and 1998, before retiring with 69 race victories in total.

== Riding style ==
Multiple-time Olympic medalist and Tour de France winner Bradley Wiggins identified Fondriest as having a particularly elegant riding style.

== Post-racing career ==
After retiring he founded the company Fondriest with his brother Francesco, making carbon fibre bicycles. He has also commentated on races for Sky Italia.

== Personal life ==
Married to Ornella, his victory in Milan-San Remo came hours after the birth of his first daughter, Vittoria. He also has children Carlotta and Lorenzo.

== Major results ==
1985
1st Piccolo Giro di Lombardia
1st Stage 8 Giro Ciclistico d'Italia
1986
1st GP di Poggiana
1st Circuito Belvedere
1st Coppa Città di San Daniele
1987
1st Stage 4 Volta a Catalunya
3rd Paris–Tours
3rd Coppa Bernocchi
3rd Giro di Romagna
3rd Memorial Gastone Nencini
6th Giro dell'Emilia
6th Milano–Torino
7th Coppa Placci
8th GP Industria & Artigianato di Larciano
1988
1st Road race, UCI Road World Championships
1st GP Industria & Commercio di Prato
1st Stage 4 Tour de Suisse
1st Stage 1a Cronostaffetta
2nd Milan–San Remo
2nd Coppa Bernocchi
2nd Giro dell'Emilia
3rd Road race, National Road Championships
3rd Giro di Campania
3rd Coppa Placci
3rd Giro di Romagna
6th Overall Tirreno–Adriatico

1st Stage 4

6th Overall Tour of Belgium
6th Firenze–Pistoia
8th G.P. Camaiore
1989
1st Giro di Toscana
1st Coppa Sabatini
1st Stage 1a Cronostaffetta
2nd Wincanton Classic
2nd Giro del Friuli
2nd G.P. Camaiore
2nd Giro del Veneto
2nd Giro dell'Emilia
2nd Trofeo Baracchi
3rd GP Industria & Artigianato di Larciano
3rd Firenze–Pistoia
6th Giro di Romagna
10th Overall Tirreno–Adriatico
10th Züri-Metzgete
1990
1st Coppa Ugo Agostoni
1st Giro del Lazio
1st Stage 2 Settimana Internazionale di Coppi e Bartali
3rd Overall Tour of Britain

1st Stage 6

3rd Paris–Tours
5th Milan–San Remo
5th Tour of Flanders
5th Overall Tirreno–Adriatico
9th Road race, UCI Road World Championships
9th Milano–Torino
1991
1st UCI Road World Cup
Volta a Catalunya

1st Stages 3a & 3b

1st Stage 3 Settimana Internazionale di Coppi e Bartali
2nd Amstel Gold Race
2nd Grand Prix Pino Cerami
3rd Clásica de San Sebastián
3rd Brabantse Pijl
4th Züri-Metzgete
4th Grand Prix des Nations
4th Firenze–Pistoia
5th Wincanton Classic
7th GP des Amériques
1992
1st Trofeo Melinda
1st Stage 5b Volta a Catalunya
1st Stage 3 Vuelta a Andalucía
2nd Giro del Lazio
3rd Road race, National Road Championships
3rd Giro di Campania
3rd Grand Prix Pino Cerami
4th Tour of Flanders
7th GP des Amériques
7th Milano–Torino
9th Paris–Tours
9th Coppa Placci
1993
1st UCI Road World Cup
1st Milan–San Remo
1st La Flèche Wallonne
1st Züri-Metzgete
1st Giro dell'Emilia
1st Firenze–Pistoia
1st Challenge San Silvestro d'Oro
1st Challenge Giglio d'Oro
1st Baden-Baden
1st Overall Tirreno–Adriatico

1st Stages 2 & 4

1st Overall Giro del Trentino

1st Stages 2, 3 & 4

1st Overall GP du Midi-Libre

1st Stages 2, 3 & 5

1st Overall Escalada a Montjuïch

1st Stages 1a & 1b (ITT)

1st Stage 5 Vuelta a Andalucía
1st Stage 5 Settimana Internazionale di Coppi e Bartali
2nd Overall Volta a Catalunya

1st Prologue & Stage 6 (ITT)

2nd Paris–Tours
3rd Liège–Bastogne–Liège
3rd Wincanton Classic
3rd Millemetri del Corso di Mestre
4th Amstel Gold Race
5th Road race, UCI Road World Championships
7th Grand Prix des Nations
8th Overall Giro d'Italia

1st Stage 1b (ITT)

8th Tour of Flanders
1994
1st Overall Tour de Pologne

1st Stages 2 & 6

1st Overall Tour of Britain

1st Stages 1 & 3a (ITT)

1st Stage 3 Settimana Internazionale di Coppi e Bartali
1st Giro del Lazio
1st Coppa Sabatini
2nd Giro dell'Emilia
3rd Züri-Metzgete
3rd Firenze–Pistoia
5th Giro di Lombardia
7th Milano–Torino
1995
1st Stage 7 Giro d'Italia
1st Prologue Volta a Catalunya
2nd Gent–Wevelgem
2nd La Flèche Wallonne
2nd Giro di Romagna
2nd Overall Tirreno–Adriatico
3rd Overall Vuelta a Murcia
5th G.P. Camaiore
7th Rund um den Henninger Turm
8th Overall KBC Driedaagse van De Panne-Koksijde

1st Stage 3b (ITT)

8th Wincanton Classic
9th Time trial, UCI Road World Championships
9th Züri-Metzgete
1996
1st Stage 3b KBC Driedaagse van De Panne-Koksijde (ITT)
2nd Overall Tour de Pologne

1st Stage 8

3rd La Flèche Wallonne
3rd Overall Settimana Internazionale di Coppi e Bartali
3rd Overall Giro di Sardegna
4th Time trial, Olympic Games
7th Rund um den Henninger Turm
9th Züri-Metzgete
1997
1st Stage 2 Volta a la Comunitat Valenciana
4th Overall Tour du Limousin
6th Trofeo Melinda

=== Grand Tour general classification results timeline ===
| Grand Tour | 1987 | 1988 | 1989 | 1990 | 1991 | 1992 | 1993 | 1994 | 1995 | 1996 | 1997 | 1998 |
|---|---|---|---|---|---|---|---|---|---|---|---|---|
| Giro d'Italia | DNF | — | 28 | — | — | — | 8 | — | DNF | — | — | — |
| Tour de France | — | — | — | — | 15 | 46 | — | — | DNF | 51 | — | — |
| Vuelta a España | — | — | — | — | — | — | — | — | — | — | 49 | DNF |

Legend
| — | Did not compete |
| DNF | Did not finish |
