= Alberto Volpi =

Italian cyclist

Personal information
- Full name: Alberto Volpi
- Born: 9 December 1962 (age 63) Saronno, Italy

Cycling career
- Sport: Cycling
- Discipline: Road
- Role: Rider

Professional teams
- 1984: Bianchi-Piaggio
- 1985–1986: Sammontana-Bianchi
- 1987: Gewiss-Bianchi
- 1988: Gewiss-Bianchi-Fina
- 1989–1990: Chateaux d'Ax
- 1991–1992: Gatorade-Chateaux d'Ax
- 1993: Mecair-Ballan
- 1994–1995: Gewiss-Ballan
- 1996: Gewiss-Playbus
- 1997: Batik-Del Monte

Major wins
- Wincanton Classic (1993)

Alberto Volpi (born 9 December 1962) is an Italian former road bicycle racer. He competed in the individual road race event at the 1984 Summer Olympics.

He formerly worked as a directeur sportif at Barloworld cycling team. Since 2024 he is the sport director and general manager of JCL Team Ukyo.

== Major results ==
1985
1st, Gran Premio Città di Camaiore
10th, Overall, Giro d'Italia

1st, Young rider classification

1989
1st, Overall, Giro di Calabria

1st, Stage 1

1993
1st, Wincanton Classic
1997
1st, Stage 3, Volta ao Alentejo
