= Wincanton Classic =

Cycling race in the United Kingdom

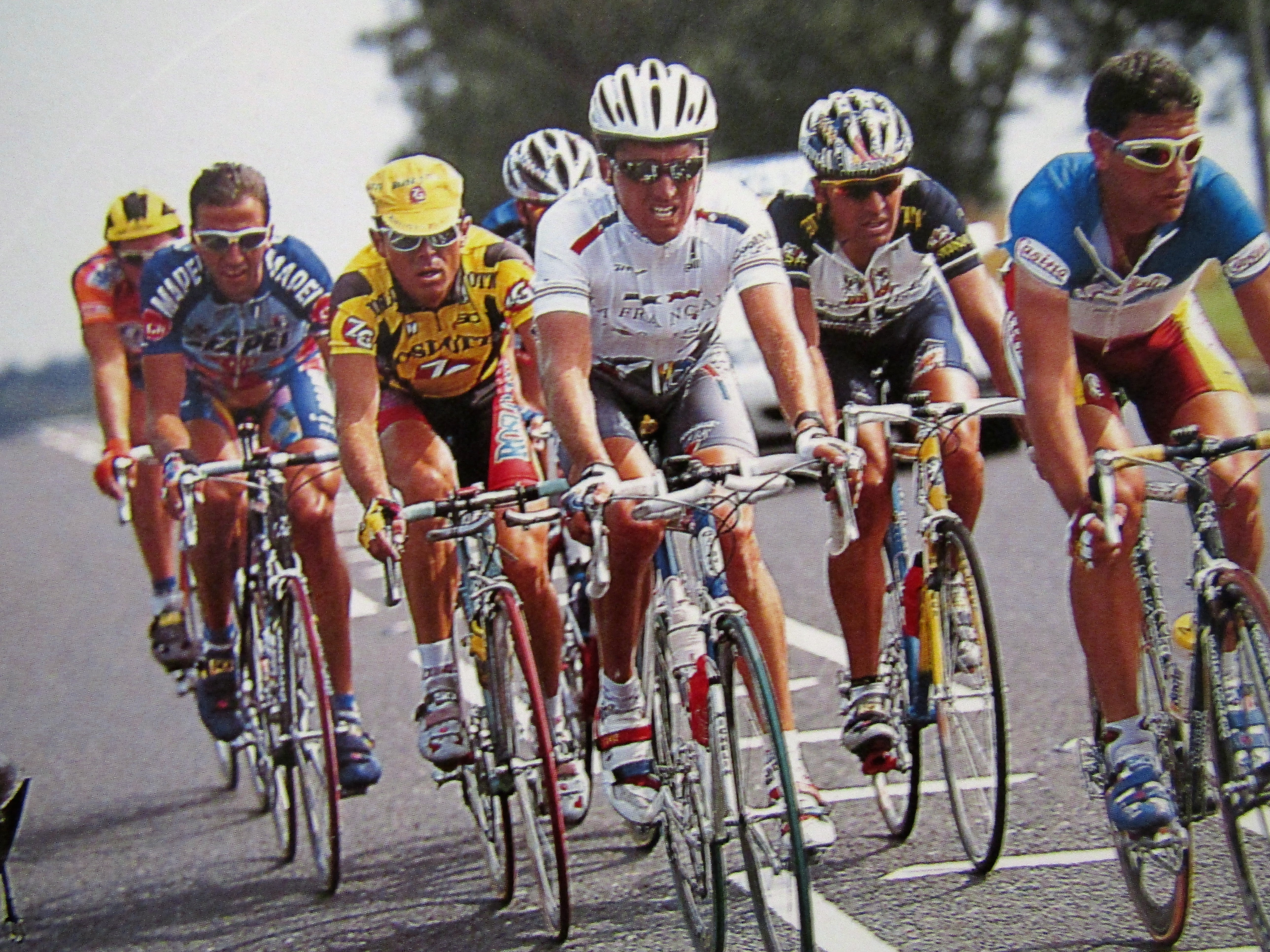

Race details
- Region: United Kingdom
- Discipline: Road race
- Competition: UCI Road World Cup
- Type: One-day

History
- First edition: 1989
- Editions: 9
- Final edition: 1997
- First winner: Frans Maassen (NED)
- Final winner: Andrea Tafi (ITA)

Wincanton Classic (also known as Leeds International Classic and Rochester International Classic) was a cycling classic taking place in the United Kingdom as part of the UCI Road World Cup.

It was first held in 1989 in Newcastle, moving to Brighton in 1990 and 1991. The following year it was moved to Leeds, to be known as Leeds International Classic between 1994 and 1996. In its last year it was held in Rochester as Rochester International Classic. In 1998 it was replaced in the UCI Road World Cup by the HEW Cyclassics.

== Winners ==
Year	Country	Rider	Team
1989	Netherlands	Frans Maassen	Superconfex–Yoko–Opel–Colnago
1990	Italy	Gianni Bugno	Chateau d'Ax
1991	Belgium	Eric van Lancker	Panasonic–Sportlife
1992	Italy	Massimo Ghirotto	Carrera Jeans–Vagabond
1993	Italy	Alberto Volpi	Mecair–Ballan
1994	Italy	Gianluca Bortolami	Mapei–CLAS
1995	Great Britain	Maximilian Sciandri	MG Maglificio–Technogym
1996	Italy	Andrea Ferrigato	Roslotto–ZG Mobili
1997	Italy	Andrea Tafi	Mapei–GB
