= 1991 UCI Road World Cup =

- Third edition of the UCI Road World Cup

Details
- Dates: March 23 – October 26
- Location: Canada and Europe
- Races: 13

Champions
- Individual champion: Maurizio Fondriest (ITA) (Panasonic–Sportlife)
- Teams' champion: Panasonic–Sportlife

The 1991 UCI Road World Cup was the third edition of the UCI Road World Cup. From the 1990 edition, the same events were retained, with the individual time trial finale event this year in Bergamo, Italy, ran as both the Grand Prix des Nations and the Trofeo Baracchi. The competition was won by Italian rider Maurizio Fondriest of Panasonic–Sportlife.

== Races ==
Date	Race	Country	Winner	Team	World Cup Leader	Leader's Team	Report
March 23	Milan–San Remo	Italy	Claudio Chiappucci (ITA)	Carrera Jeans–Tassoni	Claudio Chiappucci (ITA)	Carrera Jeans–Tassoni	Report
April 7	Tour of Flanders	Belgium	Edwig Van Hooydonck (BEL)	Buckler–Colnago–Decca	Rolf Sørensen (DEN)	Ariostea	Report
April 14	Paris–Roubaix	France	Marc Madiot (FRA)	RMO	Rolf Sørensen (DEN)	Ariostea	Report
April 21	Liège–Bastogne–Liège	Belgium	Moreno Argentin (ITA)	Ariostea	Rolf Sørensen (DEN)	Ariostea	Report
April 27	Amstel Gold Race	Netherlands	Frans Maassen (NED)	Buckler–Colnago–Decca	Rolf Sørensen (DEN)	Ariostea	Report
August 4	Wincanton Classic	United Kingdom	Eric van Lancker (BEL)	Panasonic–Sportlife	Rolf Sørensen (DEN)	Ariostea	Report
August 10	Clásica de San Sebastián	Spain	Gianni Bugno (ITA)	Chateau d'Ax–Gatorade	Maurizio Fondriest (ITA)	Panasonic–Sportlife	Report
August 18	Züri-Metzgete	Switzerland	Johan Museeuw (BEL)	Lotto	Maurizio Fondriest (ITA)	Panasonic–Sportlife	Report
September 15	Grand Prix de la Libération	Netherlands	Buckler–Colnago–Decca		Maurizio Fondriest (ITA)	Panasonic–Sportlife	Report
October 6	Grand Prix des Amériques	Canada	Eric Van Lancker (BEL)	Panasonic–Sportlife	Maurizio Fondriest (ITA)	Panasonic–Sportlife	Report
October 13	Paris–Tours	France	Johan Capiot (BEL)	TVM–Sanyo	Maurizio Fondriest (ITA)	Panasonic–Sportlife	Report
October 19	Giro di Lombardia	Italy	Sean Kelly (IRL)	Lotus–Festina	Maurizio Fondriest (ITA)	Panasonic–Sportlife	Report
October 26	Grand Prix des Nations	Italy	Tony Rominger (SUI)	Toshiba	Maurizio Fondriest (ITA)	Panasonic–Sportlife	Report

- Note: the finale event ran as both the Grand Prix des Nations and the Trofeo Baracchi and was an invitation event. The invited riders are the single Cup race winners, the first 10 of the general classification before the last race, the first 10 in the World Ranking and the reigning World Champion. Some riders forfeit their right to start and some others in the high classification of World Cup are invited.

== Single races details ==
worldcupjersey	Denotes the Classification Leader

In the race results the leader jersey identify the rider who wore the jersey in the race (the leader at the start of the race).

In the general classification table the jersey identify the leader after the race.

23 March 1991 — Milan-Sanremo 294 km (182.7 mi)

	Cyclist	Team	Time
1	Claudio Chiappucci (ITA)	Carrera Jeans–Tassoni	6h 56' 36"
2	Rolf Sørensen (DEN)	Ariostea	+ 45"
3	Eric Vanderaerden (BEL)	Buckler–Colnago–Decca	+ 57"
4	Djamolidine Abdoujaparov (URS)	Carrera Jeans–Tassoni	s.t.
5	Eddy Planckaert (BEL)	Panasonic–Sportlife	s.t.
6	Gérard Rué (FRA)	Helvetia–La Suisse	s.t.
7	Phil Anderson (AUS)	Motorola	s.t.
8	Uwe Raab (GER)	PDM–Concorde–Ultima	s.t.
9	Johnny Weltz (DEN)	ONCE	s.t.
10	Andreas Kappes (GER)	Histor–Sigma	s.t.

General classification after Milan-Sanremo

	Cyclist	Team	Points
1	Claudio Chiappucci (ITA)	Carrera Jeans–Tassoni	25
2	Rolf Sørensen (DEN)	Ariostea	22
3	Eric Vanderaerden (BEL)	Buckler–Colnago–Decca	20
4	Djamolidine Abdoujaparov (URS)	Carrera Jeans–Tassoni	18
5	Eddy Planckaert (BEL)	Panasonic–Sportlife	16
6	Gérard Rué (FRA)	Helvetia–La Suisse	15
7	Phil Anderson (AUS)	Motorola	14
8	Uwe Raab (GER)	PDM–Concorde–Ultima	13
9	Johnny Weltz (DEN)	ONCE	12
10	Andreas Kappes (GER)	Histor–Sigma	11

7 April 1991 — Tour of Flanders 261 km (162.2 mi)

	Cyclist	Team	Time
1	Edwig Van Hooydonck (BEL)	Buckler–Colnago–Decca	7h 02' 00"
2	Johan Museeuw (BEL)	Lotto	+ 45"
3	Rolf Sørensen (DEN)	Ariostea	s.t.
4	Rolf Gölz (GER)	Ariostea	s.t.
5	Frans Maassen (NED)	Buckler–Colnago–Decca	+ 1' 43"
6	Marc Madiot (FRA)	RMO	+ 1' 48"
7	Jesper Skibby (DEN)	TVM–Sanyo	s.t.
8	Franco Ballerini (ITA)	Del Tongo–MG Boys	s.t.
9	Laurent Jalabert (FRA)	Toshiba	s.t.
10	Marc Sergeant (BEL)	Panasonic–Sportlife	s.t.

General classification after Tour of Flanders

	Cyclist	Team	Points
1	Rolf Sørensen (DEN)	Ariostea	42
2	Edwig Van Hooydonck (BEL)	Buckler–Colnago–Decca	33
3	Claudio Chiappucci (ITA)	Carrera Jeans–Tassoni	25
4	Johan Museeuw (BEL)	Lotto	22
5	Eric Vanderaerden (BEL)	Buckler–Colnago–Decca	22
6	Rolf Gölz (GER)	Ariostea	18
7	Djamolidine Abdoujaparov (URS)	Carrera Jeans–Tassoni	18
8	Phil Anderson (AUS)	Motorola	17
9	Frans Maassen (NED)	Buckler–Colnago–Decca	16
10	Eddy Planckaert (BEL)	Panasonic–Sportlife	16
10	Laurent Jalabert (FRA)	Toshiba	16

14 April 1991 — Paris-Roubaix 266 km (165.3 mi)

	Cyclist	Team	Time
1	Marc Madiot (FRA)	RMO	7h 08' 19"
2	Jean-Claude Colotti (FRA)	Tonton Tapis–GB	+ 1' 07"
3	Carlo Bomans (BEL)	Weinmann–EVS	s.t.
4	Steve Bauer (CAN)	Motorola	s.t.
5	Franco Ballerini (ITA)	Del Tongo–MG Boys	s.t.
6	Wilfried Peeters (BEL)	Histor–Sigma	s.t.
7	Nico Verhoeven (NED)	PDM–Concorde–Ultima	s.t.
8	Marc Sergeant (BEL)	Panasonic–Sportlife	s.t.
9	Olaf Ludwig (GER)	Panasonic–Sportlife	+ 1' 41"
10	Hendrik Redant (NED)	Lotto	s.t.

General classification after Paris-Roubaix

	Cyclist	Team	Points
1	Rolf Sørensen (DEN)	Ariostea	42
2	Marc Madiot (FRA)	RMO	40
3	Edwig Van Hooydonck (BEL)	Buckler–Colnago–Decca	37
4	Carlo Bomans (BEL)	Weinmann–EVS	29
5	Franco Ballerini (ITA)	Del Tongo–MG Boys	29
6	Johan Museeuw (BEL)	Lotto	27
7	Claudio Chiappucci (ITA)	Carrera Jeans–Tassoni	25
8	Marc Sergeant (BEL)	Panasonic–Sportlife	24
9	Jean-Claude Colotti (FRA)	Tonton Tapis–GB	22
10	Eric Vanderaerden (BEL)	Buckler–Colnago–Decca	22

21 April 1991 — Liège–Bastogne–Liège 267 km (165.9 mi)

	Cyclist	Team	Time
1	Moreno Argentin (ITA)	Ariostea	7h 15' 00"
2	Claude Criquielion (BEL)	Lotto	s.t.
3	Rolf Sørensen (DEN)	Ariostea	s.t.
4	Miguel Induráin (ESP)	Banesto	s.t.
5	Eric Van Lancker (BEL)	Panasonic–Sportlife	+ 10"
6	Raúl Alcalá (MEX)	PDM–Concorde–Ultima	s.t.
7	Marino Lejarreta (ESP)	ONCE	s.t.
8	Stephen Roche (IRL)	Tonton Tapis–GB	s.t.
9	Edwig Van Hooydonck (BEL)	Buckler–Colnago–Decca	+ 2' 30"
10	Dirk De Wolf (BEL)	Tonton Tapis–GB	+ 2' 36"

General classification after Liège–Bastogne–Liège

	Cyclist	Team	Points
1	Rolf Sørensen (DEN)	Ariostea	62
2	Edwig Van Hooydonck (BEL)	Buckler–Colnago–Decca	49
3	Marc Madiot (FRA)	RMO	40
4	Carlo Bomans (BEL)	Weinmann–EVS	36
5	Franco Ballerini (ITA)	Del Tongo–MG Boys	29
6	Laurent Jalabert (FRA)	Toshiba	29
7	Johan Museeuw (BEL)	Lotto	27
8	Moreno Argentin (ITA)	Ariostea	25
9	Claudio Chiappucci (ITA)	Carrera Jeans–Tassoni	25
10	Marc Sergeant (BEL)	Panasonic–Sportlife	24

27 April 1991 — Amstel Gold Race 244 km (151.6 mi)

	Cyclist	Team	Time
1	Frans Maassen (NED)	Buckler–Colnago–Decca	6h 04' 46"
2	Maurizio Fondriest (ITA)	Panasonic–Sportlife	s.t.
3	Dirk De Wolf (BEL)	Tonton Tapis–GB	s.t.
4	Thierry Laurent (FRA)	RMO	+ 10"
5	Eric Vanderaerden (BEL)	Buckler–Colnago–Decca	+ 16"
6	Olaf Ludwig (GER)	Panasonic–Sportlife	s.t.
7	Laurent Jalabert (FRA)	Toshiba	s.t.
8	Carlo Bomans (BEL)	Weinmann–EVS	s.t.
9	Jelle Nijdam (NED)	Buckler–Colnago–Decca	s.t.
10	Johan Museeuw (BEL)	Lotto	s.t.

General classification after Amstel Gold Race

	Cyclist	Team	Points
1	Rolf Sørensen (DEN)	Ariostea	68
2	Edwig Van Hooydonck (BEL)	Buckler–Colnago–Decca	56
3	Carlo Bomans (BEL)	Weinmann–EVS	49
4	Frans Maassen (NED)	Buckler–Colnago–Decca	44
5	Laurent Jalabert (FRA)	Toshiba	43
6	Dirk De Wolf (BEL)	Tonton Tapis–GB	41
7	Marc Madiot (FRA)	RMO	40
8	Johan Museeuw (BEL)	Lotto	38
9	Maurizio Fondriest (ITA)	Panasonic–Sportlife	38
10	Eric Vanderaerden (BEL)	Buckler–Colnago–Decca	38

4 August 1991 — Wincanton Classic 234.5 km (145.7 mi)

	Cyclist	Team	Time
1	Eric Van Lancker (BEL)	Panasonic–Sportlife	6h 16' 05"
2	Rolf Gölz (GER)	Ariostea	+ 29"
3	Jan Goessens (BEL)	Weinmann–Eddy Merckx	+ 44"
4	Gilles Delion (FRA)	Helvetia–La Suisse	s.t.
5	Maurizio Fondriest (ITA)	Panasonic–Sportlife	s.t.
6	Steven Rooks (NED)	Buckler–Colnago–Decca	s.t.
7	Marc Madiot (FRA)	RMO	s.t.
8	Luc Leblanc (FRA)	Castorama–Raleigh	s.t.
9	Claudio Chiappucci (ITA)	Carrera Jeans–Tassoni	s.t.
10	Frans Maassen (NED)	Buckler–Colnago–Decca	s.t.

General classification after Wincanton Classic

	Cyclist	Team	Points
1	Rolf Sørensen (DEN)	Ariostea	68
2	Edwig Van Hooydonck (BEL)	Buckler–Colnago–Decca	56
3	Frans Maassen (NED)	Buckler–Colnago–Decca	55
4	Marc Madiot (FRA)	RMO	54
5	Maurizio Fondriest (ITA)	Panasonic–Sportlife	54
6	Carlo Bomans (BEL)	Weinmann–Eddy Merckx	49
7	Rolf Gölz (GER)	Ariostea	45
8	Laurent Jalabert (FRA)	Toshiba	43
9	Eric Van Lancker (BEL)	Panasonic–Sportlife	41
9	Dirk De Wolf (BEL)	Tonton Tapis–GB	41
9	Franco Ballerini (ITA)	Del Tongo–MG Boys	41

10 August 1991 — Clásica de San Sebastián 238 km (147.9 mi)

	Cyclist	Team	Time
1	Gianni Bugno (ITA)	Chateau d'Ax–Gatorade	6h 04' 28"
2	Pedro Delgado (ESP)	Banesto	+ 55"
3	Maurizio Fondriest (ITA)	Panasonic–Sportlife	+ 1' 17"
4	Laurent Jalabert (FRA)	Toshiba	s.t.
5	Iñaki Gastón (ESP)	CLAS–Cajastur	s.t.
6	Gilles Delion (FRA)	Helvetia–La Suisse	s.t.
7	Bruno Cenghialta (ITA)	Ariostea	s.t.
8	Piotr Ugrumov (URS)	Seur–Otero	s.t.
9	Andreas Kappes (GER)	Histor–Sigma	+ 1' 58"
10	Charly Mottet (FRA)	RMO	s.t.

General classification after Clásica de San Sebastián

	Cyclist	Team	Points
1	Maurizio Fondriest (ITA)	Panasonic–Sportlife	74
2	Rolf Sørensen (DEN)	Ariostea	68
3	Laurent Jalabert (FRA)	Toshiba	61
4	Edwig Van Hooydonck (BEL)	Buckler–Colnago–Decca	56
5	Frans Maassen (NED)	Buckler–Colnago–Decca	55
6	Marc Madiot (FRA)	RMO	54
7	Carlo Bomans (BEL)	Weinmann–Eddy Merckx	49
8	Claudio Chiappucci (ITA)	Carrera Jeans–Tassoni	47
9	Marc Sergeant (BEL)	Panasonic–Sportlife	47
10	Rolf Gölz (GER)	Ariostea	45

18 August 1991 — Züri-Metzgete 240 km (149.1 mi)

	Cyclist	Team	Time
1	Johan Museeuw (BEL)	Lotto	6h 28' 13"
2	Laurent Jalabert (FRA)	Toshiba	s.t.
3	Max Sciandri (ITA)	Carrera Jeans–Tassoni	s.t.
4	Maurizio Fondriest (ITA)	Panasonic–Sportlife	s.t.
5	Edwig Van Hooydonck (BEL)	Buckler–Colnago–Decca	s.t.
6	Andrei Tchmil (URS)	S.E.F.B.–Saxon–Gan	s.t.
7	Phil Anderson (AUS)	Motorola	s.t.
8	Falk Boden (GER)	PDM–Concorde–Ultima	s.t.
9	Luc Roosen (BEL)	Tulip Computers	s.t.
10	Dirk De Wolf (BEL)	Tonton Tapis–GB	s.t.

General classification after Züri-Metzgete

	Cyclist	Team	Points
1	Maurizio Fondriest (ITA)	Panasonic–Sportlife	92
2	Laurent Jalabert (FRA)	Toshiba	83
3	Edwig Van Hooydonck (BEL)	Buckler–Colnago–Decca	72
4	Rolf Sørensen (DEN)	Ariostea	68
5	Johan Museeuw (BEL)	Lotto	63
6	Frans Maassen (NED)	Buckler–Colnago–Decca	55
7	Marc Madiot (FRA)	RMO	54
8	Dirk De Wolf (BEL)	Tonton Tapis–GB	52
9	Carlo Bomans (BEL)	Weinmann–Eddy Merckx	49
10	Claudio Chiappucci (ITA)	Carrera Jeans–Tassoni	47
10	Phil Anderson (AUS)	Motorola	47
10	Marc Sergeant (BEL)	Panasonic–Sportlife	47

15 September 1991 — Grand Prix de la Libération 90 km (55.9 mi) (TTT)

	Team	Time
1	Buckler–Colnago–Decca	1h 37' 15"
2	ONCE	+ 18"
3	Panasonic–Sportlife	+ 42"
4	PDM–Concorde–Ultima	+ 1' 25"
5	TVM–Sanyo	+ 1' 33"
6	Motorola	+ 2' 02"
7	Tulip Computers	+ 2' 34"
8	Lotus–Festina	+ 2' 46"
9	Weinmann–Eddy Merckx	+ 3' 12"
10	Histor–Sigma	+ 3' 17"

General classification after Grand Prix de la Libération

	Cyclist	Team	Points
1	Maurizio Fondriest (ITA)	Panasonic–Sportlife	92
2	Laurent Jalabert (FRA)	Toshiba	83
3	Edwig Van Hooydonck (BEL)	Buckler–Colnago–Decca	72
4	Rolf Sørensen (DEN)	Ariostea	68
5	Johan Museeuw (BEL)	Lotto	63
6	Frans Maassen (NED)	Buckler–Colnago–Decca	55
7	Marc Madiot (FRA)	RMO	54
8	Dirk De Wolf (BEL)	Tonton Tapis–GB	52
9	Carlo Bomans (BEL)	Weinmann–Eddy Merckx	49
10	Claudio Chiappucci (ITA)	Carrera Jeans–Tassoni	47
10	Phil Anderson (AUS)	Motorola	47
10	Marc Sergeant (BEL)	Panasonic–Sportlife	47

Grand Prix de la Libération gave no points in individual standing (only in team standing)

6 October 1991 — Grand Prix des Amériques 224 km (139.2 mi)

	Cyclist	Team	Time
1	Eric Van Lancker (BEL)	Panasonic–Sportlife	5h 54' 15"
2	Steven Rooks (NED)	Buckler–Colnago–Decca	s.t.
3	Martin Earley (IRL)	PDM–Concorde–Ultima	s.t.
4	Mauro Gianetti (SUI)	Helvetia–La Suisse	s.t.
5	Robert Millar (GBR)	Z	s.t.
6	Tony Rominger (SUI)	Toshiba	s.t.
7	Maurizio Fondriest (ITA)	Panasonic–Sportlife	s.t.
8	Adri van der Poel (NED)	Tulip Computers	+ 1' 02"
9	Edwig Van Hooydonck (BEL)	Buckler–Colnago–Decca	s.t.
10	Marc Madiot (FRA)	RMO	s.t.

General classification after Grand Prix des Amériques

	Cyclist	Team	Points
1	Maurizio Fondriest (ITA)	Panasonic–Sportlife	106
2	Edwig Van Hooydonck (BEL)	Buckler–Colnago–Decca	84
3	Laurent Jalabert (FRA)	Toshiba	83
4	Rolf Sørensen (DEN)	Ariostea	68
5	Eric Van Lancker (BEL)	Panasonic–Sportlife	67
6	Marc Madiot (FRA)	RMO	65
7	Johan Museeuw (BEL)	Lotto	63
8	Frans Maassen (NED)	Buckler–Colnago–Decca	55
9	Dirk De Wolf (BEL)	Tonton Tapis–GB	52
10	Carlo Bomans (BEL)	Weinmann–Eddy Merckx	49

13 October 1991 — Paris-Tours 286 km (177.7 mi)

	Cyclist	Team	Time
1	Johan Capiot (BEL)	TVM–Sanyo	7h 26' 48"
2	Olaf Ludwig (GER)	Panasonic–Sportlife	s.t.
3	Nico Verhoeven (NED)	PDM–Concorde–Ultima	s.t.
4	Adri van der Poel (NED)	Tulip Computers	s.t.
5	Rolf Sørensen (DEN)	Ariostea	s.t.
6	Peter Pieters (NED)	Tulip Computers	s.t.
7	Laurent Jalabert (FRA)	Toshiba	s.t.
8	Frankie Andreu (USA)	Motorola	s.t.
9	Johan Museeuw (BEL)	Lotto	s.t.
10	Rudy Verdonck (BEL)	Weinmann–Eddy Merckx	s.t.

General classification after Paris-Tours

	Cyclist	Team	Points
1	Maurizio Fondriest (ITA)	Panasonic–Sportlife	106
2	Laurent Jalabert (FRA)	Toshiba	97
3	Edwig Van Hooydonck (BEL)	Buckler–Colnago–Decca	84
4	Rolf Sørensen (DEN)	Ariostea	84
5	Johan Museeuw (BEL)	Lotto	75
6	Eric Van Lancker (BEL)	Panasonic–Sportlife	67
7	Marc Madiot (FRA)	RMO	65
8	Frans Maassen (NED)	Buckler–Colnago–Decca	55
9	Dirk De Wolf (BEL)	Tonton Tapis–GB	52
10	Olaf Ludwig (GER)	Panasonic–Sportlife	49
10	Carlo Bomans (BEL)	Weinmann–Eddy Merckx	49

19 October 1991 — Giro di Lombardia 243 km (151.0 mi)

	Cyclist	Team	Time
1	Sean Kelly (IRL)	PDM–Concorde–Ultima	6h 10' 38"
2	Martial Gayant (FRA)	Toshiba	s.t.
3	Franco Ballerini (ITA)	Del Tongo–MG Boys	+ 35"
4	Bruno Cornillet (FRA)	Z	s.t.
5	Rolf Sørensen (DEN)	Ariostea	+ 2' 09"
6	Alberto Volpi (ITA)	Chateau d'Ax–Gatorade	s.t.
7	Dante Rezze (FRA)	RMO	s.t.
8	Laurent Jalabert (FRA)	Toshiba	+ 2' 19"
9	Sammie Moreels (BEL)	Lotto	s.t.
10	Marco Vitali (ITA)	Jolly Componibili–Club 88	s.t.

General classification after Giro di Lombardia

	Cyclist	Team	Points
1	Maurizio Fondriest (ITA)	Panasonic–Sportlife	114
2	Laurent Jalabert (FRA)	Toshiba	110
3	Rolf Sørensen (DEN)	Ariostea	100
4	Edwig Van Hooydonck (BEL)	Buckler–Colnago–Decca	84
5	Johan Museeuw (BEL)	Lotto	75
6	Eric Van Lancker (BEL)	Panasonic–Sportlife	67
7	Marc Madiot (FRA)	RMO	65
8	Franco Ballerini (ITA)	Del Tongo–MG Boys	61
9	Frans Maassen (NED)	Buckler–Colnago–Decca	55
10	Dirk De Wolf (BEL)	Tonton Tapis–GB	52

26 October 1991 — Grand Prix des Nations 64 km (39.8 mi) (ITT)

	Cyclist	Team	Time
1	Tony Rominger (SUI)	Toshiba	1h 20' 40"
2	Erik Breukink (NED)	PDM–Concorde–Ultima	+ 58"
3	Thomas Wegmüller (SUI)	Weinmann–Eddy Merckx	+ 2' 08"
4	Maurizio Fondriest (ITA)	Panasonic–Sportlife	+ 2' 12"
5	Federico Echave (ESP)	CLAS–Cajastur	+ 2' 16"
6	Frans Maassen (NED)	Buckler–Colnago–Decca	+ 2' 22"
7	Rolf Sørensen (DEN)	Ariostea	+ 2' 24"
8	Stephen Hodge (AUS)	ONCE	+ 2' 25"
9	Melcior Mauri (ESP)	ONCE	+ 2' 44"
10	Laurent Jalabert (FRA)	Toshiba	+ 3' 20"

General classification after Grand Prix des Nations

	Cyclist	Team	Points
1	Maurizio Fondriest (ITA)	Panasonic–Sportlife	132
2	Laurent Jalabert (FRA)	Toshiba	121
3	Rolf Sørensen (DEN)	Ariostea	114
4	Edwig Van Hooydonck (BEL)	Buckler–Colnago–Decca	94
5	Johan Museeuw (BEL)	Lotto	82
6	Marc Madiot (FRA)	RMO	71
7	Frans Maassen (NED)	Buckler–Colnago–Decca	70
8	Eric Van Lancker (BEL)	Panasonic–Sportlife	67
9	Franco Ballerini (ITA)	Del Tongo–MG Boys	66
10	Adri van der Poel (NED)	Tulip Computers	57

== Final standings ==
=== Individual ===
Points are awarded to the top 20 classified riders. All riders taking points are classified, there is no minimum races to start.

The points are awarded for every race using the following system:

Position	1st	2nd	3rd	4th	5th	6th	7th	8th	9th	10th	11th	12th	13th	14th	15th	16th	17th	18th	19th	20th
Points	25	22	20	18	16	15	14	13	12	11	10	9	8	7	6	5	4	3	2	1

Pos.	Rider	Team	MSR	ToF	ROU	LBL	AGR	WIN	CSS	ZUR	LIB	AME	TOU	LOM	NAT	Pts.
1	Maurizio Fondriest (ITA)	Panasonic–Sportlife	9	6	0	1	22	16	20	18	*	14	0	8	18	132
2	Laurent Jalabert (FRA)	Toshiba	4	12	3	10	14	0	18	22	*	0	14	13	11	121
3	Rolf Sørensen (DEN)	Ariostea	22	20	0	20	6	0	0	0	*	0	16	16	14	114
4	Edwig Van Hooydonck (BEL)	Buckler–Colnago–Decca	8	25	4	12	7	0	0	16	*	12	0	0	10	94
5	Johan Museeuw (BEL)	Lotto	0	22	5	0	11	0	0	25	*	0	12	0	7	82
6	Marc Madiot (FRA)	RMO	0	15	25	0	0	14	0	0	*	11	0	0	6	71
7	Frans Maassen (NED)	Buckler–Colnago–Decca	0	16	0	3	25	11	0	0	*	0	0	0	15	70
8	Eric Van Lancker (BEL)	Panasonic–Sportlife	0	0	0	16	0	25	1	0	*	25	0	0	0	67
9	Franco Ballerini (ITA)	Del Tongo–MG Boys	0	13	16	0	2	10	0	0	*	0	0	20	5	66
10	Adri van der Poel (NED)	Tulip Computers	0	0	0	0	8	0	0	0	*	13	18	10	8	57
11	Dirk De Wolf (BEL)	Tonton Tapis–GB	0	10	0	11	20	0	0	11	*	0	0	0	0	52
12	Phil Anderson (AUS)	Motorola	14	3	0	6	10	0	0	14	*	0	0	0	4	51
13	Claudio Chiappucci (ITA)	Carrera Jeans–Tassoni	25	0	0	0	0	12	10	0	*	0	0	0	3	50
14	Carlo Bomans (BEL)	Weinmann–Eddy Merckx	0	9	20	7	13	0	0	0	*	0	0	0	0	49
15	Olaf Ludwig (GER)	Panasonic–Sportlife	0	0	12	0	15	0	0	0	*	0	22	0	0	49
16	Marc Sergeant (BEL)	Panasonic–Sportlife	0	11	13	0	9	6	8	0	*	0	0	0	0	47
17	Steven Rooks (NED)	Buckler–Colnago–Decca	0	0	0	0	0	15	6	0	*	22	0	3	0	46
18	Tony Rominger (SUI)	Toshiba	0	0	0	0	0	0	0	0	*	15	0	6	25	46
19	Rolf Gölz (GER)	Ariostea	0	18	0	5	0	22	0	0	*	0	0	0	0	45
20	Nico Verhoeven (NED)	PDM–Concorde–Ultima	0	0	14	8	0	0	0	0	*	0	20	0	0	42
Race winners out of the top 20
Pos.	Rider	Team	MSR	ToF	ROU	LBL	AGR	WIN	CSS	ZUR	LIB	AME	TOU	LOM	NAT	Pts.
22	Moreno Argentin (ITA)	Ariostea	0	0	0	25	0	0	9	0	*	0	0	0	0	34
28	Gianni Bugno (ITA)	Chateau d'Ax–Gatorade	0	0	0	4	0	0	25	0	*	0	0	0	0	29
30	Sean Kelly (IRL)	PDM–Concorde–Ultima	0	0	0	0	0	0	0	0	*	0	3	25	0	28
32	Johan Capiot (BEL)	TVM–Sanyo	0	0	0	0	0	0	0	0	*	0	25	0	2	27

* Grand Prix de la Libération gave no points in individual standing (only in team standing)

Key
Colour	Result
Gold	Winner
Silver	2nd place
Bronze	3rd place
Green	Top ten position
Blue	Other points position
Purple	Out of points, retired or did not start

=== Teams ===
	Team	Points
1	Panasonic–Sportlife	107
2	Buckler–Colnago–Decca	87
3	PDM–Concorde–Ultima	65
4	Ariostea	50
5	Lotto	46
