= 1991 Grand Prix de la Libération =

1991 UCI Road World Cup

Race details
- Dates: 15 September 1991
- Stages: 1
- Distance: 90 km (55.92 mi)
- Winning time: 1h 37' 15"

Results
	Winner	Buckler–Colnago–Decca (NED)
	Second	ONCE (ESP)
	Third	Panasonic–Sportlife (NED)

The 1991 Grand Prix de la Libération was the 4th and last edition of the Grand Prix de la Libération team time trial cycle race and was held on 15 September 1991. The race started and finished in Eindhoven. The race was won by Buckler–Colnago–Decca team.

== General classification ==
Final general classification

	Team	Riders	Time
1	(Netherlands) Buckler–Colnago–Decca	Edwig Van Hooydonck (BEL); Jelle Nijdam (NED); Gerrit de Vries (NED); Patrick Eyk (NED); Wilco Zuijderwijk (NED); Frans Maassen (NED)	1h 37' 15"
2	(Spain) ONCE	Melcior Mauri (ESP); Herminio Díaz Zabala (ESP); Joan Llaneras (ESP); Johnny Weltz (DEN); Stephen Hodge (AUS); Marino Lejarreta (ESP)	+ 18"
3	(Netherlands) Panasonic–Sportlife	Dimitri Zhdanov (URS); Olaf Ludwig (GER); Jacques Hanegraaf (NED); Rudy Dhaenens (BEL); Viatcheslav Ekimov (URS); Maurizio Fondriest (ITA)	+ 42"
4	(Netherlands) PDM–Concorde–Ultima	Falk Boden (GER); Erik Breukink (NED); Tom Cordes (NED); Sean Kelly (IRE); Uwe Raab (GER); Raúl Alcalá (MEX)	+ 1' 25"
5	(Netherlands) TVM–Sanyo	Martin Schalkers (NED); Eddy Schurer (NED); Jesper Skibby (DEN); Dimitri Konyshev (URS); Sergei Uslamin (URS); Vasily Zhdanov (URS)	+ 1' 33"
6	(United States) Motorola	Brian Walton (CAN); Sean Yates (GBR); Andy Bishop (USA); Ron Kiefel (USA); Dag Otto Lauritzen (NOR); Norman Alvis (USA)	+ 2' 02"
7	(Belgium) Tulip Computers	Peter Pieters (NED); Joseph Parkin (USA); Ronny Van Holen (BEL); Allan Peiper (AUS); Adri van der Poel (NED)	+ 2' 34"
8	(Spain) Lotus–Festina	Jesús Blanco Villar (ESP); Romes Gainetdinov (URS); Mathieu Hermans (NED); Yuri Manuylov (URS); Dimitri Vassiltchenko (URS); Roberto Pagnin (ITA)	+ 2' 46"
9	(Belgium) Weinmann–Eddy Merckx	Michel Dernies (BEL); Thomas Wegmüller (SUI); Kurt Steinmann (SUI); Jan Goessens (BEL); Carlo Bomans (BEL)	+ 3' 12"
10	(Belgium) Histor–Sigma	Brian Holm (DEN); Søren Lilholt (DEN); Herman Frison (BEL); Etienne De Wilde (BEL); Kai Hundertmarck (GER); Wilfried Peeters (BEL)	+ 3' 17"
