= 1989 UCI Road World Cup =

- First edition of the UCI Road World Cup

Details
- Dates: March 18 – October 14
- Location: Canada and Europe
- Races: 12

Champions
- Individual champion: Sean Kelly (IRL) (PDM–Ultima–Concorde)
- Teams' champion: PDM–Ultima–Concorde

The 1989 UCI Road World Cup was the first edition of the UCI Road World Cup. It was won by Irish rider Sean Kelly of PDM–Ultima–Concorde. Only in this edition, a grey-yellow jersey was awarded to the leader without the rainbow scheme.

== Races ==
Date	Race	Country	Winner	Team	World Cup Leader	Leader's Team	Report
March 18	Milan–San Remo	Italy	Laurent Fignon (FRA)	Super U–Raleigh–Fiat	Laurent Fignon (FRA)	Super U–Raleigh–Fiat	Report
April 2	Tour of Flanders	Belgium	Edwig Van Hooydonck (BEL)	Superconfex–Yoko–Opel–Colnago	Edwig Van Hooydonck (BEL)	Superconfex–Yoko–Opel–Colnago	Report
April 9	Paris–Roubaix	France	Jean-Marie Wampers (BEL)	Panasonic–Isostar–Colnago–Agu	Edwig Van Hooydonck (BEL)	Superconfex–Yoko–Opel–Colnago	Report
April 16	Liège–Bastogne–Liège	Belgium	Sean Kelly (IRL)	PDM–Ultima–Concorde	Edwig Van Hooydonck (BEL)	Superconfex–Yoko–Opel–Colnago	Report
April 22	Amstel Gold Race	Netherlands	Eric van Lancker (BEL)	Panasonic–Isostar–Colnago–Agu	Edwig Van Hooydonck (BEL)	Superconfex–Yoko–Opel–Colnago	Report
July 30	Wincanton Classic	United Kingdom	Frans Maassen (NED)	Superconfex–Yoko–Opel–Colnago	Sean Kelly (IRL)	PDM–Ultima–Concorde	Report
August 6	Grand Prix des Amériques	Canada	Jörg Müller (SUI)	PDM–Ultima–Concorde	Sean Kelly (IRL)	PDM–Ultima–Concorde	Report
August 12	Clásica de San Sebastián	Spain	Gerhard Zadrobilek (AUT)	7-Eleven	Sean Kelly (IRL)	PDM–Ultima–Concorde	Report
August 20	Züri-Metzgete	Switzerland	Steve Bauer (CAN)	Helvetia–La Suisse	Sean Kelly (IRL)	PDM–Ultima–Concorde	Report
September 17	Grand Prix de la Libération	Netherlands	TVM–Ragno		Sean Kelly (IRL)	PDM–Ultima–Concorde	Report
October 7	Paris–Tours	France	Jelle Nijdam (NED)	Superconfex–Yoko–Opel–Colnago	Sean Kelly (IRL)	PDM–Ultima–Concorde	Report
October 14	Giro di Lombardia	Italy	Tony Rominger (SUI)	Chateau d'Ax	Sean Kelly (IRL)	PDM–Ultima–Concorde	Report

== Single races details ==
greenjersey	Denotes the Classification Leader

In the race results the leader jersey identify the rider who wore the jersey in the race (the leader at the start of the race).

In the general classification table the jersey identify the leader after the race.

18 March 1989 — Milan–San Remo 294 km (182.7 mi)

	Rider	Team	Time
1	Laurent Fignon (FRA)	Super U–Raleigh–Fiat	7h 08' 19"
2	Frans Maassen (NED)	Superconfex–Yoko–Opel–Colnago	+ 7"
3	Adriano Baffi (ITA)	Ariostea	+ 30"
4	Ronan Pensec (FRA)	Z–Peugeot	s.t.
5	Sean Kelly (IRL)	PDM–Ultima–Concorde	s.t.
6	Danilo Gioia (ITA)	Atala–Campagnolo	s.t.
7	Rudy Dhaenens (BEL)	PDM–Ultima–Concorde	s.t.
8	Gérard Rué (FRA)	Super U–Raleigh–Fiat	s.t.
9	Giuseppe Calcaterra (ITA)	Atala–Campagnolo	s.t.
10	Etienne De Wilde (BEL)	Histor–Sigma	s.t.

General classification after Milan–San Remo

	Rider	Team	Points
1	Laurent Fignon (FRA)	Super U–Raleigh–Fiat	12
2	Frans Maassen (NED)	Superconfex–Yoko–Opel–Colnago	9
3	Adriano Baffi (ITA)	Ariostea	8
4	Ronan Pensec (FRA)	Z–Peugeot	7
5	Sean Kelly (IRL)	PDM–Ultima–Concorde	6
6	Danilo Gioia (ITA)	Atala–Campagnolo	5
7	Rudy Dhaenens (BEL)	PDM–Ultima–Concorde	4
8	Gérard Rué (FRA)	Super U–Raleigh–Fiat	3
9	Giuseppe Calcaterra (ITA)	Atala–Campagnolo	2
10	Etienne De Wilde (BEL)	Histor–Sigma	1

2 April 1989 — Tour of Flanders 264 km (164.0 mi)

	Rider	Team	Time
1	Edwig Van Hooydonck (BEL)	Superconfex–Yoko–Opel–Colnago	7h 01' 28"
2	Herman Frison (BEL)	Histor–Sigma	+ 22"
3	Dag Otto Lauritzen (NOR)	7-Eleven	s.t.
4	Rolf Sørensen (DEN)	Ariostea	s.t.
5	Mathieu Hermans (NED)	Caja Rural	s.t.
6	Marc Sergeant (BEL)	Hitachi	s.t.
7	Allan Peiper (AUS)	Panasonic–Isostar–Colnago–Agu	s.t.
8	Dirk De Wolf (BEL)	Hitachi	+ 1' 45"
9	Johan Lammerts (NED)	AD Renting–W-Cup–Bottecchia	s.t.
10	Steve Bauer (CAN)	Helvetia–La Suisse	+ 1' 53"

General classification after Tour of Flanders

	Rider	Team	Points
1	Edwig Van Hooydonck (BEL)	Superconfex–Yoko–Opel–Colnago	12
2	Laurent Fignon (FRA)	Super U–Raleigh–Fiat	12
3	Herman Frison (BEL)	Histor–Sigma	9
4	Frans Maassen (NED)	Superconfex–Yoko–Opel–Colnago	9
5	Dag Otto Lauritzen (NOR)	7-Eleven	8
6	Adriano Baffi (ITA)	Ariostea	8
7	Rolf Sørensen (DEN)	Ariostea	7
8	Ronan Pensec (FRA)	Z–Peugeot	7
9	Mathieu Hermans (NED)	Caja Rural	6
10	Sean Kelly (IRL)	PDM–Ultima–Concorde	6

9 April 1989 — Paris–Roubaix 265 km (164.7 mi)

	Rider	Team	Time
1	Jean-Marie Wampers (BEL)	Panasonic–Isostar–Colnago–Agu	6h 46' 45"
2	Dirk De Wolf (BEL)	Hitachi	s.t.
3	Edwig Van Hooydonck (BEL)	Superconfex–Yoko–Opel–Colnago	+ 59"
4	Gilbert Duclos-Lassalle (FRA)	Z–Peugeot	s.t.
5	Eddy Planckaert (BEL)	AD Renting–W-Cup–Bottecchia	s.t.
6	Marc Madiot (FRA)	Toshiba	s.t.
7	Herman Frison (BEL)	Histor–Sigma	+ 4' 27"
8	Jacques Hanegraaf (NED)	TVM–Ragno	s.t.
9	Urs Freuler (SUI)	Panasonic–Isostar–Colnago–Agu	s.t.
10	Johan Lammerts (NED)	AD Renting–W-Cup–Bottecchia	s.t.

General classification after Paris–Roubaix

	Rider	Team	Points
1	Edwig Van Hooydonck (BEL)	Superconfex–Yoko–Opel–Colnago	20
2	Herman Frison (BEL)	Histor–Sigma	13
3	Jean-Marie Wampers (BEL)	Panasonic–Isostar–Colnago–Agu	12
4	Laurent Fignon (FRA)	Super U–Raleigh–Fiat	12
5	Dirk De Wolf (BEL)	Hitachi	12
6	Frans Maassen (NED)	Superconfex–Yoko–Opel–Colnago	9
7	Dag Otto Lauritzen (NOR)	7-Eleven	8
8	Adriano Baffi (ITA)	Ariostea	8
9	Gilbert Duclos-Lassalle (FRA)	Z–Peugeot	7
10	Rolf Sørensen (DEN)	Ariostea	7
11	Ronan Pensec (FRA)	Z–Peugeot	7

16 April 1989 — Liège–Bastogne–Liège 267 km (165.9 mi)

	Rider	Team	Time
1	Sean Kelly (IRL)	PDM–Ultima–Concorde	7h 23' 40"
2	Fabrice Philipot (FRA)	Toshiba	s.t.
3	Phil Anderson (AUS)	TVM–Ragno	s.t.
4	Pedro Delgado (ESP)	Reynolds	s.t.
5	Sammie Moreels (BEL)	Lotto–Vlaanderen–Jong–Mbk–Merckx	s.t.
6	Steven Rooks (NED)	PDM–Ultima–Concorde	s.t.
7	Laurent Fignon (FRA)	Super U–Raleigh–Fiat	s.t.
8	Eric Van Lancker (BEL)	Panasonic–Isostar–Colnago–Agu	s.t.
9	Bruno Cornillet (FRA)	Z–Peugeot	s.t.
10	Miguel Induráin (ESP)	Reynolds	s.t.

General classification after Liège–Bastogne–Liège

	Rider	Team	Points
1	Edwig Van Hooydonck (BEL)	Superconfex–Yoko–Opel–Colnago	20
2	Sean Kelly (IRL)	PDM–Ultima–Concorde	18
3	Laurent Fignon (FRA)	Super U–Raleigh–Fiat	16
4	Herman Frison (BEL)	Histor–Sigma	13
5	Jean-Marie Wampers (BEL)	Panasonic–Isostar–Colnago–Agu	12
6	Dirk De Wolf (BEL)	Hitachi	12
7	Fabrice Philipot (FRA)	Toshiba	9
8	Frans Maassen (NED)	Superconfex–Yoko–Opel–Colnago	9
9	Phil Anderson (AUS)	TVM–Ragno	8
10	Dag Otto Lauritzen (NOR)	7-Eleven	8
11	Adriano Baffi (ITA)	Ariostea	8

22 April 1989 — Amstel Gold Race 242 km (150.4 mi)

	Rider	Team	Time
1	Eric Van Lancker (BEL)	Panasonic–Isostar–Colnago–Agu	5h 59' 49"
2	Claude Criquielion (BEL)	Hitachi	+ 19"
3	Steve Bauer (CAN)	Helvetia–La Suisse	s.t.
4	Nico Verhoeven (NED)	PDM–Ultima–Concorde	+ 20"
5	Mauro Gianetti (SUI)	Helvetia–La Suisse	+ 22"
6	Per Pedersen (DEN)	RMO	+ 1' 45"
7	Marc Madiot (FRA)	Toshiba	s.t.
8	Jozef Lieckens (BEL)	Hitachi	+ 1' 47"
9	Eddy Planckaert (BEL)	AD Renting–W-Cup–Bottecchia	s.t.
10	Adri van der Poel (NED)	Domex–Weinmann	s.t.

General classification after Amstel Gold Race

	Rider	Team	Points
1	Edwig Van Hooydonck (BEL)	Superconfex–Yoko–Opel–Colnago	20
2	Sean Kelly (IRL)	PDM–Ultima–Concorde	18
3	Laurent Fignon (FRA)	Super U–Raleigh–Fiat	16
4	Eric Van Lancker (BEL)	Panasonic–Isostar–Colnago–Agu	15
5	Herman Frison (BEL)	Histor–Sigma	13
6	Jean-Marie Wampers (BEL)	Panasonic–Isostar–Colnago–Agu	12
7	Dirk De Wolf (BEL)	Hitachi	12
8	Claude Criquielion (BEL)	Hitachi	9
9	Fabrice Philipot (FRA)	Toshiba	9
10	Frans Maassen (NED)	Superconfex–Yoko–Opel–Colnago	9
11	Steve Bauer (CAN)	Helvetia–La Suisse	9
12	Marc Madiot (FRA)	Toshiba	9

30 July 1989 — Wincanton Classic 236.5 km (147.0 mi)

	Rider	Team	Time
1	Frans Maassen (NED)	Superconfex–Yoko–Opel–Colnago	5h 59' 21"
2	Maurizio Fondriest (ITA)	Del Tongo	+ 2"
3	Sean Kelly (IRL)	PDM–Ultima–Concorde	s.t.
4	Etienne De Wilde (BEL)	Histor–Sigma	s.t.
5	Teun van Vliet (NED)	Panasonic–Isostar–Colnago–Agu	s.t.
6	Paolo Rosola (ITA)	Gewiss–Bianchi	s.t.
7	Herman Frison (BEL)	Histor–Sigma	s.t.
8	Bruno Cornillet (FRA)	Z–Peugeot	s.t.
9	Sammie Moreels (BEL)	Lotto–Vlaanderen–Jong–Mbk–Merckx	s.t.
10	Stephan Joho (SUI)	Ariostea	s.t.

General classification after Wincanton Classic

	Rider	Team	Points
1	Sean Kelly (IRL)	PDM–Ultima–Concorde	28
2	Frans Maassen (NED)	Superconfex–Yoko–Opel–Colnago	23
3	Edwig Van Hooydonck (BEL)	Superconfex–Yoko–Opel–Colnago	20
4	Herman Frison (BEL)	Histor–Sigma	19
5	Laurent Fignon (FRA)	Super U–Raleigh–Fiat	16
6	Eric Van Lancker (BEL)	Panasonic–Isostar–Colnago–Agu	15
7	Jean-Marie Wampers (BEL)	Panasonic–Isostar–Colnago–Agu	12
8	Dirk De Wolf (BEL)	Hitachi	12
9	Maurizio Fondriest (ITA)	Del Tongo	11
10	Etienne De Wilde (BEL)	Histor–Sigma	10
11	Sammie Moreels (BEL)	Lotto–Vlaanderen–Jong–Mbk–Merckx	10

6 August 1989 — Grand Prix des Amériques 224 km (139.2 mi)

	Rider	Team	Time
1	Jörg Müller (SUI)	PDM–Ultima–Concorde	6h 03' 39"
2	(France) Yvon Madiot	Toshiba	+ 45"
3	Charly Mottet (FRA)	RMO	+ 57"
4	Greg LeMond (USA)	AD Renting–W-Cup–Bottecchia	+ 1' 31"
5	Sean Kelly (IRL)	PDM–Ultima–Concorde	s.t.
6	Pascal Richard (SUI)	Helvetia–La Suisse	s.t.
7	Theo de Rooij (NED)	Panasonic–Isostar–Colnago–Agu	s.t.
8	Marc Madiot (FRA)	Toshiba	s.t.
9	Robert Millar (GBR)	Z–Peugeot	s.t.
10	Acácio da Silva (POR)	Carrera Jeans–Vagabond	s.t.

General classification after Grand Prix des Amériques

	Rider	Team	Points
1	Sean Kelly (IRL)	PDM–Ultima–Concorde	36
2	Frans Maassen (NED)	Superconfex–Yoko–Opel–Colnago	23
3	Edwig Van Hooydonck (BEL)	Superconfex–Yoko–Opel–Colnago	20
4	Herman Frison (BEL)	Histor–Sigma	19
5	Laurent Fignon (FRA)	Super U–Raleigh–Fiat	16
6	Eric Van Lancker (BEL)	Panasonic–Isostar–Colnago–Agu	15
7	Jörg Müller (SUI)	PDM–Ultima–Concorde	14
8	Marc Madiot (FRA)	Toshiba	14
9	Jean-Marie Wampers (BEL)	Panasonic–Isostar–Colnago–Agu	12
10	Dirk De Wolf (BEL)	Hitachi	12

12 August 1989 — Clásica de San Sebastián 244 km (151.6 mi)

	Rider	Team	Time
1	Gerhard Zadrobilek (AUT)	7-Eleven	6h 24' 10"
2	Francisco Antequera (ESP)	BH	+ 2' 05"
3	Tony Rominger (SUI)	Chateau d'Ax	s.t.
4	Charly Mottet (FRA)	RMO	+ 2' 09"
5	Jesús Rodríguez Magro (ESP)	Reynolds	s.t.
6	Jean-Claude Leclercq (FRA)	Helvetia–La Suisse	s.t.
7	Gert-Jan Theunisse (NED)	PDM–Ultima–Concorde	s.t.
8	Andrew Hampsten (USA)	7-Eleven	s.t.
9	Juan Tomás Martínez (ESP)	Lotus–Zahor	s.t.
10	Julián Gorospe (ESP)	Reynolds	s.t.

General classification after Clásica de San Sebastián

	Rider	Team	Points
1	Sean Kelly (IRL)	PDM–Ultima–Concorde	36
2	Frans Maassen (NED)	Superconfex–Yoko–Opel–Colnago	23
3	Edwig Van Hooydonck (BEL)	Superconfex–Yoko–Opel–Colnago	20
4	Herman Frison (BEL)	Histor–Sigma	19
5	Charly Mottet (FRA)	RMO	19
6	Laurent Fignon (FRA)	Super U–Raleigh–Fiat	16
7	Eric Van Lancker (BEL)	Panasonic–Isostar–Colnago–Agu	15
8	Gerhard Zadrobilek (AUT)	7-Eleven	14
9	Jörg Müller (SUI)	PDM–Ultima–Concorde	14
10	Marc Madiot (FRA)	Toshiba	14

20 August 1989 — Züri-Metzgete 255.5 km (158.8 mi)

	Rider	Team	Time
1	Steve Bauer (CAN)	Helvetia–La Suisse	6h 45' 11"
2	Acácio da Silva (POR)	Carrera Jeans–Vagabond	+ 3"
3	Rolf Gölz (GER)	Superconfex–Yoko–Opel–Colnago	s.t.
4	Rolf Sørensen (DEN)	Ariostea	s.t.
5	Raúl Alcalá (MEX)	PDM–Ultima–Concorde	s.t.
6	Andreas Kappes (GER)	Toshiba	s.t.
7	Tony Rominger (SUI)	Chateau d'Ax	s.t.
8	Marc Madiot (FRA)	Toshiba	s.t.
9	Bruno Cornillet (FRA)	Z–Peugeot	s.t.
10	Maurizio Fondriest (ITA)	Del Tongo	+ 1' 21"

General classification after Züri-Metzgete

	Rider	Team	Points
1	Sean Kelly (IRL)	PDM–Ultima–Concorde	36
2	Steve Bauer (CAN)	Helvetia–La Suisse	23
3	Frans Maassen (NED)	Superconfex–Yoko–Opel–Colnago	23
4	Edwig Van Hooydonck (BEL)	Superconfex–Yoko–Opel–Colnago	20
5	Herman Frison (BEL)	Histor–Sigma	19
6	Charly Mottet (FRA)	RMO	19
7	Marc Madiot (FRA)	Toshiba	19
8	Laurent Fignon (FRA)	Super U–Raleigh–Fiat	16
9	Tony Rominger (SUI)	Chateau d'Ax	16
10	Rolf Sørensen (DEN)	Ariostea	16

17 September 1989 — Grand Prix de la Libération 112.5 km (69.9 mi) (TTT)

	Team	Time
1	TVM–Ragno	2h 16' 35"
2	Super U–Raleigh–Fiat	+ 22"
3	Histor–Sigma	+ 31"
4	Panasonic–Isostar–Colnago–Agu	+ 32"
5	PDM–Ultima–Concorde	+ 45"
6	Helvetia–La Suisse	+ 1' 09"
7	Paternina	+ 1' 43"
8	RMO	+ 2' 24"
9	Superconfex–Yoko–Opel–Colnago	+ 2' 46"
10	Carrera Jeans–Vagabond	+ 3' 13"

General classification after Grand Prix de la Libération

	Rider	Team	Points
1	Sean Kelly (IRL)	PDM–Ultima–Concorde	36
2	Steve Bauer (CAN)	Helvetia–La Suisse	23
3	Frans Maassen (NED)	Superconfex–Yoko–Opel–Colnago	23
4	Edwig Van Hooydonck (BEL)	Superconfex–Yoko–Opel–Colnago	20
5	Herman Frison (BEL)	Histor–Sigma	19
6	Charly Mottet (FRA)	RMO	19
7	Marc Madiot (FRA)	Toshiba	19
8	Laurent Fignon (FRA)	Super U–Raleigh–Fiat	16
9	Tony Rominger (SUI)	Chateau d'Ax	16
10	Rolf Sørensen (DEN)	Ariostea	16

Grand Prix de la Libération gave no points in individual standing (only in team standing)

7 October 1989 — Paris–Tours 283 km (175.8 mi)

	Rider	Team	Time
1	Jelle Nijdam (NED)	Superconfex–Yoko–Opel–Colnago	7h 11' 42"
2	Eric Vanderaerden (BEL)	Panasonic–Isostar–Colnago–Agu	s.t.
3	Johan Museeuw (BEL)	AD Renting–W-Cup–Bottecchia	s.t.
4	Rolf Sørensen (DEN)	Ariostea	s.t.
5	Adriano Baffi (ITA)	Ariostea	s.t.
6	Sammie Moreels (BEL)	Lotto–Vlaanderen–Jong–Mbk–Merckx	s.t.
7	Sean Kelly (IRL)	PDM–Ultima–Concorde	s.t.
8	Marcel Wüst (FRG)	RMO	s.t.
9	Guido Bontempi (ITA)	Carrera Jeans–Vagabond	s.t.
10	Jean-Claude Colotti (FRA)	RMO	s.t.

General classification after Paris–Tours

	Rider	Team	Points
1	Sean Kelly (IRL)	PDM–Ultima–Concorde	44
2	Rolf Sørensen (DEN)	Ariostea	27
3	Steve Bauer (CAN)	Helvetia–La Suisse	23
4	Frans Maassen (NED)	Superconfex–Yoko–Opel–Colnago	23
5	Edwig Van Hooydonck (BEL)	Superconfex–Yoko–Opel–Colnago	20
6	Herman Frison (BEL)	Histor–Sigma	19
7	Charly Mottet (FRA)	RMO	19
8	Sammie Moreels (BEL)	Lotto–Vlaanderen–Jong–Mbk–Merckx	19
9	Marc Madiot (FRA)	Toshiba	19
10	Adriano Baffi (ITA)	Ariostea	18

14 October 1989 — Giro di Lombardia 260 km (161.6 mi)

	Rider	Team	Time
1	Tony Rominger (SUI)	Chateau d'Ax	6h 46' 35"
2	Gilles Delion (FRA)	Helvetia–La Suisse	+ 2' 33"
3	Luc Roosen (BEL)	Histor–Sigma	+ 2' 34"
4	Raúl Alcalá (MEX)	PDM–Ultima–Concorde	+ 4' 06"
5	Roberto Pagnin (ITA)	Malvor–Sidi	s.t.
6	Patrick Robeet (BEL)	Domex–Weinmann	s.t.
7	Marcello Siboni (ITA)	Ariostea	s.t.
8	Rolf Gölz (FRG)	Superconfex–Yoko–Opel–Colnago	+ 4' 33"
9	Martin Earley (IRL)	PDM–Ultima–Concorde	s.t.
10	Franco Ballerini (ITA)	Malvor–Sidi	s.t.

General classification after Giro di Lombardia

	Rider	Team	Points
1	Sean Kelly (IRL)	PDM–Ultima–Concorde	44
2	Tony Rominger (SUI)	Chateau d'Ax	32
3	Rolf Sørensen (DEN)	Ariostea	27
4	Steve Bauer (CAN)	Helvetia–La Suisse	23
5	Frans Maassen (NED)	Superconfex–Yoko–Opel–Colnago	23
6	Edwig Van Hooydonck (BEL)	Superconfex–Yoko–Opel–Colnago	20
7	Herman Frison (BEL)	Histor–Sigma	19
8	Charly Mottet (FRA)	RMO	19
9	Raúl Alcalá (MEX)	PDM–Ultima–Concorde	19
10	Marc Madiot (FRA)	Toshiba	19

== Final standings ==
=== Riders ===
	Cyclist	Team	Points
1	Sean Kelly (IRL)	PDM–Ultima–Concorde	44
2	Tony Rominger (SUI)	Chateau d'Ax	32
3	Rolf Sørensen (DEN)	Ariostea	27
4	Frans Maassen (NED)	Superconfex–Yoko–Opel–Colnago	23
5	Steve Bauer (CAN)	Helvetia–La Suisse	23
6	Edwig Van Hooydonck (BEL)	Superconfex–Yoko–Opel–Colnago	20
7	Herman Frison (BEL)	Histor–Sigma	19
8	Charly Mottet (FRA)	RMO	19
9	Raúl Alcalá (MEX)	PDM–Ultima–Concorde	19
10	Marc Madiot (FRA)	Toshiba	19

=== Teams ===
	Team	Points
1	PDM–Ultima–Concorde	120
2	Helvetia–La Suisse	101
3	Histor–Sigma	78
4	Panasonic–Isostar–Colnago–Agu	66
5	TVM–Ragno	45
