= 1991 Wincanton Classic =

Road cycling race

1991 UCI Road World Cup

Race details
- Dates: 4 August 1991
- Stages: 1
- Distance: 234.5 km (145.7 mi)
- Winning time: 6h 16' 05"

Results
	Winner	Eric Van Lancker (BEL)	(Panasonic–Sportlife)
	Second	Rolf Gölz (GER)	(Ariostea)
	Third	Jan Goessens (BEL)	(Weinmann–Eddy Merckx)

The 1991 Wincanton Classic was the 3rd edition of the Wincanton Classic cycle race (also known as Leeds International Classic and Rochester International Classic) and was held on 4 August. The race took place in and around Brighton. The race was won by Eric Van Lancker of the Panasonic–Sportlife team.

== Results ==
	Rider	Team	Time
1	Eric Van Lancker (BEL)	Panasonic–Sportlife	6h 16' 05"
2	Rolf Gölz (GER)	Ariostea	+ 29"
3	Jan Goessens (BEL)	Weinmann–Eddy Merckx	+ 44"
4	Gilles Delion (FRA)	Helvetia–La Suisse	s.t.
5	Maurizio Fondriest (ITA)	Panasonic–Sportlife	s.t.
6	Steven Rooks (NED)	Buckler–Colnago–Decca	s.t.
7	Marc Madiot (FRA)	RMO	s.t.
8	Luc Leblanc (FRA)	Castorama–Raleigh	s.t.
9	Claudio Chiappucci (ITA)	Carrera Jeans–Tassoni	s.t.
10	Frans Maassen (NED)	Buckler–Colnago–Decca	s.t.
