= 1990 Dwars door België =

Race details
- Dates: 22 March 1990
- Stages: 1
- Distance: 200 km (124.3 mi)
- Winning time: 4h 57' 00"

Results
	Winner	Edwig Van Hooydonck (BEL)
	Second	Adri van der Poel (NED)
	Third	Marc Sergeant (BEL)

The 1990 Dwars door België was the 45th edition of the Dwars door Vlaanderen cycle race and was held on 22 March 1990. The race started and finished in Waregem. The race was won by Edwig Van Hooydonck.

== General classification ==
Final general classification

Rank	Rider	Time
1	Edwig Van Hooydonck (BEL)	4h 57' 00"
2	Adri van der Poel (NED)	+ 0"
3	Marc Sergeant (BEL)	+ 0"
4	Stefan Räkers (NED)	+ 0"
5	Kim Andersen (DEN)	+ 0"
6	Noël Segers (BEL)	+ 0"
7	Carlo Bomans (BEL)	+ 1' 10"
8	Johan Museeuw (BEL)	+ 1' 10"
9	Frans Maassen (NED)	+ 1' 10"
10	Dimitri Konyshev (URS)	+ 1' 10"
