= 1989 Dwars door België =

Race details
- Dates: 23 March 1989
- Stages: 1
- Distance: 204 km (126.8 mi)
- Winning time: 5h 11' 00"

Results
	Winner	Dirk De Wolf (BEL)
	Second	Theo de Rooij (NED)
	Third	Johan Museeuw (BEL)

The 1989 Dwars door België was the 44th edition of the Dwars door Vlaanderen cycle race and was held on 23 March 1989. The race started and finished in Waregem. The race was won by Dirk De Wolf.

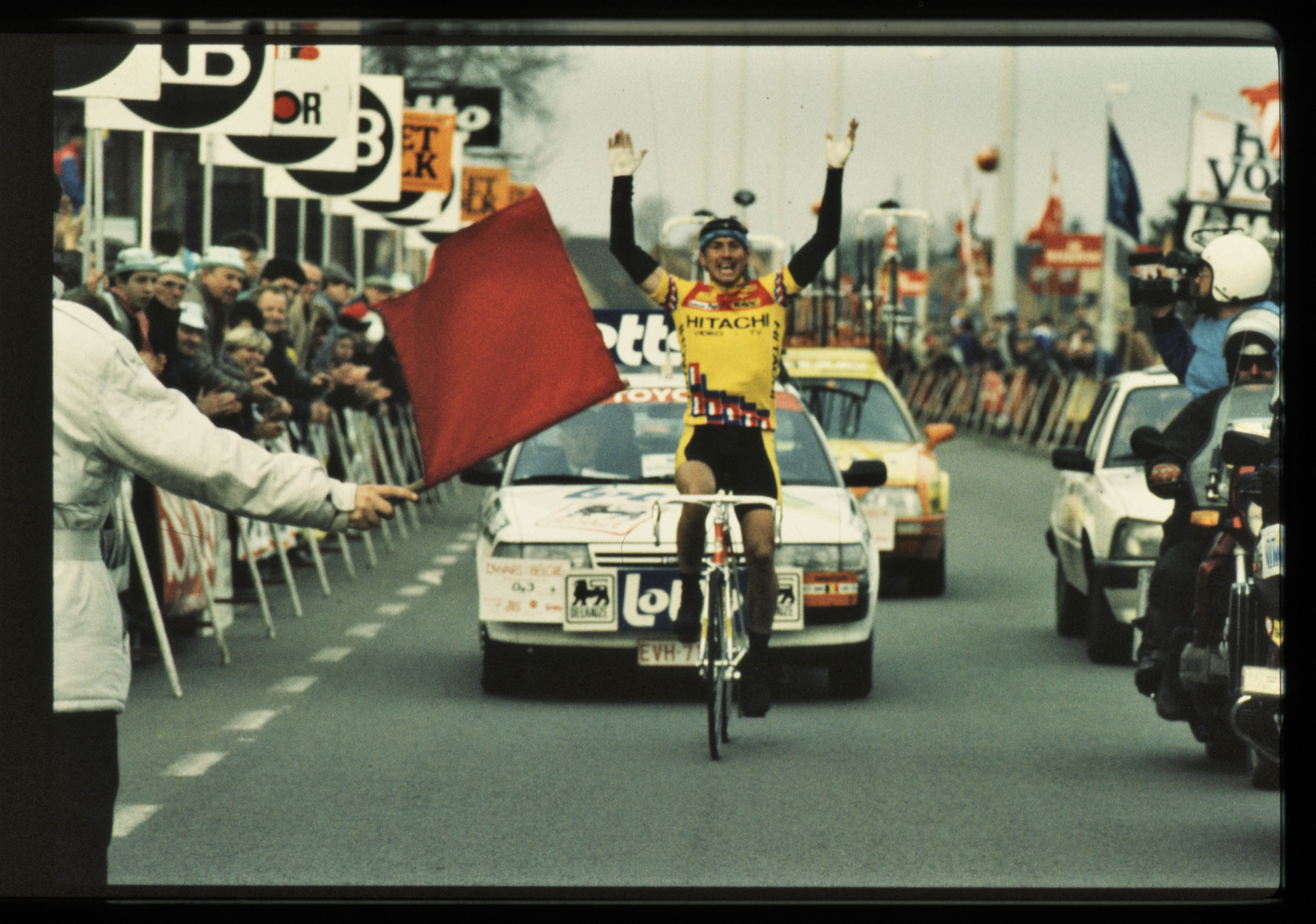
Dirk De Wolf at the finish

== General classification ==
Final general classification

Rank	Rider	Time
1	Dirk De Wolf (BEL)	5h 11' 00"
2	Theo de Rooij (NED)	+ 1' 45"
3	Johan Museeuw (BEL)	+ 1' 55"
4	Johan Capiot (BEL)	+ 1' 55"
5	Herman Frison (BEL)	+ 1' 55"
6	Ludwig Willems (BEL)	+ 1' 55"
7	Nico Verhoeven (NED)	+ 1' 55"
8	Eric Van Lancker (BEL)	+ 1' 55"
9	Jos Haex (BEL)	+ 1' 55"
10	David Mann (GBR)	+ 1' 55"
