= 1996 Dwars door België =

Race details
- Dates: 27 March 1996
- Stages: 1
- Distance: 210 km (130.5 mi)
- Winning time: 5h 18' 00"

Results
| | Winner | Tristan Hoffman (NED) |
| | Second | Edwig Van Hooydonck (BEL) |
| | Third | Brian Holm (DEN) |

The 1996 Dwars door België was the 51st edition of the Dwars door Vlaanderen cycle race and was held on 27 March 1996. The race started and finished in Waregem. The race was won by Tristan Hoffman.

== General classification ==
Final general classification

| Rank | Rider | Time |
|---|---|---|
| 1 | Tristan Hoffman (NED) | 5h 18' 00" |
| 2 | Edwig Van Hooydonck (BEL) | + 0" |
| 3 | Brian Holm (DEN) | + 0" |
| 4 | Carlo Bomans (BEL) | + 0" |
| 5 | Franco Ballerini (ITA) | + 9" |
| 6 | Lars Michaelsen (DEN) | + 2' 25" |
| 7 | Wilfried Peeters (BEL) | + 2' 34" |
| 8 | Arvis Piziks (LAT) | + 2' 34" |
| 9 | Andrei Tchmil (UKR) | + 2' 34" |
| 10 | Fabio Roscioli (ITA) | + 2' 34" |
