= 1991 Züri-Metzgete =

1991 UCI Road World Cup

Race details
- Dates: 18 August 1991
- Stages: 1
- Distance: 240 km (149.1 mi)
- Winning time: 6h 28' 13"

Results
	Winner	Johan Museeuw (BEL)	(Lotto)
	Second	Laurent Jalabert (FRA)	(Toshiba)
	Third	Max Sciandri (GBR)	(Carrera Jeans–Tassoni)

The 1991 Züri-Metzgete was the 76th edition of the Züri-Metzgete road cycling one day race. It was held on 18 August 1991 as part of the 1991 UCI Road World Cup. The race was won by Johan Museeuw of Belgium.

== Result ==
	Cyclist	Team	Time
1	Johan Museeuw (BEL)	Lotto	6h 28' 13"
2	Laurent Jalabert (FRA)	Toshiba	s.t.
3	Max Sciandri (ITA)	Carrera Jeans–Tassoni	s.t.
4	Maurizio Fondriest (ITA)	Panasonic–Sportlife	s.t.
5	Edwig Van Hooydonck (BEL)	Buckler–Colnago–Decca	s.t.
6	Andrei Tchmil (URS)	S.E.F.B.–Saxon–Gan	s.t.
7	Phil Anderson (AUS)	Motorola	s.t.
8	Falk Boden (GER)	PDM–Concorde–Ultima	s.t.
9	Luc Roosen (BEL)	Tulip Computers	s.t.
10	Dirk De Wolf (BEL)	Tonton Tapis–GB	s.t.
