= 1991 Grand Prix des Amériques (cycling race) =

1991 UCI Road World Cup

Race details
- Dates: October 6, 1991
- Stages: 1
- Distance: 224 km (139.2 mi)
- Winning time: 5h 54' 15"

Results
	Winner	Eric Van Lancker (BEL)	(Panasonic–Sportlife)
	Second	Steven Rooks (NED)	(Buckler–Colnago–Decca)
	Third	Martin Earley (IRL)	(PDM–Concorde–Ultima)

The 1991 Grand Prix des Amériques was the 4th edition of the Grand Prix des Amériques cycle race and was held on October 6, 1991. The race started and finished in Montreal. The race was won by Eric Van Lancker of the Panasonic–Sportlife team.

== General classification ==
Final general classification

	Cyclist	Team	Time
1	Eric Van Lancker (BEL)	Panasonic–Sportlife	5h 54' 15"
2	Steven Rooks (NED)	Buckler–Colnago–Decca	s.t.
3	Martin Earley (IRL)	PDM–Concorde–Ultima	s.t.
4	Mauro Gianetti (SUI)	Helvetia–La Suisse	s.t.
5	Robert Millar (GBR)	Z	s.t.
6	Tony Rominger (SUI)	Toshiba	s.t.
7	Maurizio Fondriest (ITA)	Panasonic–Sportlife	s.t.
8	Adri van der Poel (NED)	Tulip Computers	+ 1' 02"
9	Edwig Van Hooydonck (BEL)	Buckler–Colnago–Decca	s.t.
10	Marc Madiot (FRA)	RMO	s.t.
