= 1989 Tour of Flanders =

73rd Tour of Flanders
1989 UCI Road World Cup, race 2 of 12

Race details
- Dates: 2 April 1989
- Stages: 1
- Distance: 264 km (164.0 mi)
- Winning time: 7h 01' 00"

Results
	Winner	Edwig Van Hooydonck (BEL)	(Superconfex)
	Second	Herman Frison (BEL)	(Histor–Sigma)
	Third	Dag-Otto Lauritzen (NOR)	(7-Eleven–American Airlines)

The 73rd running of the Tour of Flanders cycling classic was held on 2 April 1989. It was won by Edwig Van Hooydonck after a 12-kilometer solo. 77 of 177 riders finished the race.

== Race report ==
A group of seven with Edwig Van Hooydonck, Dag-Otto Lauritzen and Rolf Sørensen makes the decisive breakaway on the Berendries, 30 km from the finish. Lauritzen tries to go solo, but is caught by Van Hooydonck, who places a fierce attack on the Bosberg, 12 km from the finish, and maintains his effort to the line. Herman Frison wins the sprint for second before Lauritzen. At 22, Van Hooydonck becomes the youngest post-War winner of the Tour of Flanders.

== Route ==
The race started in Sint-Niklaas and finished in Meerbeke (Ninove) – totaling 264 km. The course featured 12 categorized climbs:

- Molenberg
- Oude Kwaremont
- Paterberg
- Kortekeer
- Taaienberg
- Berg ten Houte
- Eikenberg
- Varent
- Leberg
- Berendries
- Muur-Kapelmuur
- Bosberg

== Results ==
Result
Rank	Rider	Team	Time
1	Edwig Van Hooydonck (BEL)	Superconfex–Yoko	7h 01' 28"
2	Herman Frison (BEL)	Histor–Sigma	+ 22"
3	Dag-Otto Lauritzen (NOR)	7-Eleven–American Airlines	s.t.
4	Rolf Sørensen (DEN)	Ariostea	s.t.
5	Mathieu Hermans (NED)	Caja Rural	s.t.
6	Marc Sergeant (BEL)	Hitachi	s.t.
7	Allan Peiper (AUS)	Panasonic–Isostar	s.t.
8	Dirk De Wolf (BEL)	Hitachi	+ 1' 45"
9	Johan Lammerts (NED)	ADR–Santini	s.t.
10	Steve Bauer (CAN)	Helvetia–La Suisse	+ 1' 53"
