= 1991 Omloop Het Volk =

Race details
- Dates: 2 March 1991
- Stages: 1
- Distance: 201 km (125 mi)
- Winning time: 4h 46' 00"

Results
	Winner	Andreas Kappes (GER)
	Second	Carlo Bomans (BEL)
	Third	Edwig Van Hooydonck (BEL)

The 1991 Omloop Het Volk was the 45th edition of the Omloop Het Volk cycle race and was held on 2 March 1991. The race started and finished in Ghent. The race was won by Andreas Kappes.

== General classification ==
Final general classification
Rank	Rider	Time
1	Andreas Kappes (GER)	4h 46' 00"
2	Carlo Bomans (BEL)	+ 0"
3	Edwig Van Hooydonck (BEL)	+ 0"
4	Peter Huyghe (BEL)	+ 0"
5	Jelle Nijdam (NED)	+ 0"
6	Johan Museeuw (BEL)	+ 0"
7	Wilfried Nelissen (BEL)	+ 0"
8	Marc Sergeant (BEL)	+ 0"
9	Thierry Gouvenou (FRA)	+ 0"
10	Etienne De Wilde (BEL)	+ 0"
