= 1991 Amstel Gold Race =

Dutch cycling race

The 1991 Amstel Gold Race was the 26th edition of the annual Amstel Gold Race road bicycle race, held on Saturday April 27, 1991, in the Dutch province of Limburg. The race stretched 244 kilometres, with the start in Heerlen and the finish in Maastricht. There were a total of 185 competitors, with 123 cyclists finishing the race.

== Results ==
| | Cyclist | Team | Time |
|---|---|---|---|
| 1 | Frans Maassen (NED) | Buckler–Colnago–Decca | 6h 04' 46" |
| 2 | Maurizio Fondriest (ITA) | Panasonic–Sportlife | s.t. |
| 3 | Dirk De Wolf (BEL) | Tonton Tapis–GB | s.t. |
| 4 | Thierry Laurent (FRA) | RMO | + 10" |
| 5 | Eric Vanderaerden (BEL) | Buckler–Colnago–Decca | + 16" |
| 6 | Olaf Ludwig (GER) | Panasonic–Sportlife | s.t. |
| 7 | Laurent Jalabert (FRA) | Toshiba | s.t. |
| 8 | Carlo Bomans (BEL) | Weinmann-EVS | s.t. |
| 9 | Jelle Nijdam (NED) | Buckler–Colnago–Decca | s.t. |
| 10 | Johan Museeuw (BEL) | Lotto | s.t. |
