= 1991 Tour of Flanders =

75th Tour of Flanders
1991 UCI Road World Cup, race 2

Race details
- Dates: 7 April 1991
- Stages: 1
- Distance: 261 km (162.2 mi)
- Winning time: 7h 02' 00"

Results
	Winner	Edwig Van Hooydonck (BEL)	(Buckler–Colnago–Decca)
	Second	Johan Museeuw (BEL)	(Lotto)
	Third	Rolf Sørensen (DEN)	(Ariostea)

The 75th running of the Tour of Flanders cycling classic was held on Sunday, 7 April 1991. Edwig Van Hooydonck won the race, his second after 1989. The race was the second leg of the UCI Road World Cup. 102 of 194 riders finished.

== Race report ==
A group of 24 riders, containing all favourites, were in front after the Molenberg. Edwig Van Hooydonck, Johan Museeuw, Rolf Sørensen ad Rolf Gölz broke away on Tenbosse in Brakel. Van Hooydonck tried to drop his companions on the Muur van Geraardsbergen, before really going solo on the Bosberg, the ultimate climb of the day, and powering on to the finish. Museeuw won the sprint for second place before Sørensen. Sørensen was the new leader in the World Cup.

== Route ==
The race started in Sint-Niklaas and finished in Meerbeke (Ninove) – totaling 261 km.
The course featured 14 categorized climbs:

- Oude Kwaremont
- Paterberg
- Kortekeer
- Taaienberg
- Berg ten Houte
- Bovenstraat–Kouterberg
- Eikenberg
- Volkegemberg
- Varent
- Leberg
- Molenberg
- Berendries
- Muur-Kapelmuur
- Bosberg

== Results ==
Result
Rank	Rider	Team	Time
1	Edwig Van Hooydonck (BEL)	Buckler–Colnago–Decca	7h 02' 00"
2	Johan Museeuw (BEL)	Lotto	+ 45"
3	Rolf Sørensen (DEN)	Ariostea	s.t.
4	Rolf Gölz (GER)	Ariostea	s.t.
5	Frans Maassen (NED)	Buckler–Colnago–Decca	+ 1' 43"
6	Marc Madiot (FRA)	RMO	+ 1' 48"
7	Jesper Skibby (DEN)	TVM–Sanyo	s.t.
8	Franco Ballerini (ITA)	Del Tongo	s.t.
9	Laurent Jalabert (FRA)	Toshiba	s.t.
10	Marc Sergeant (BEL)	Panasonic–Sportlife	s.t.
