= 1993 UCI Road World Championships – Men's road race =

Men's Individual Road Race
1993 UCI Road World Championships
- Rainbow jersey

Race details
- Dates: 29 August 1993
- Stages: 1
- Distance: 257.6 km (160.1 mi)
- Winning time: 6h 17' 10"

Results
	Winner	Lance Armstrong (USA)	(United States)
	Second	Miguel Induráin (ESP)	(Spain)
	Third	Olaf Ludwig (GER)	(Germany)

The men's road race at the 1993 UCI Road World Championships was the 60th edition of the event. The race took place on Sunday 29 August 1993 in Oslo, Norway. The race was won by Lance Armstrong of the United States.

== Final classification ==
General classification (1–10)

Rank	Rider	Time
1st place, gold medalist(s)	Lance Armstrong (USA)	6h 17' 10"
2nd place, silver medalist(s)	Miguel Induráin (ESP)	+ 19"
3rd place, bronze medalist(s)	Olaf Ludwig (GER)	+ 19"
4	Johan Museeuw (BEL)	+ 19"
5	Maurizio Fondriest (ITA)	+ 19"
6	Andrei Tchmil (MDA)	+ 19"
7	Dag Otto Lauritzen (NOR)	+ 19"
8	Gérard Rué (FRA)	+ 19"
9	Bjarne Riis (DEN)	+ 19"
10	Frans Maassen (NED)	+ 19"
