= Dag Otto Lauritzen =

Norwegian cyclist

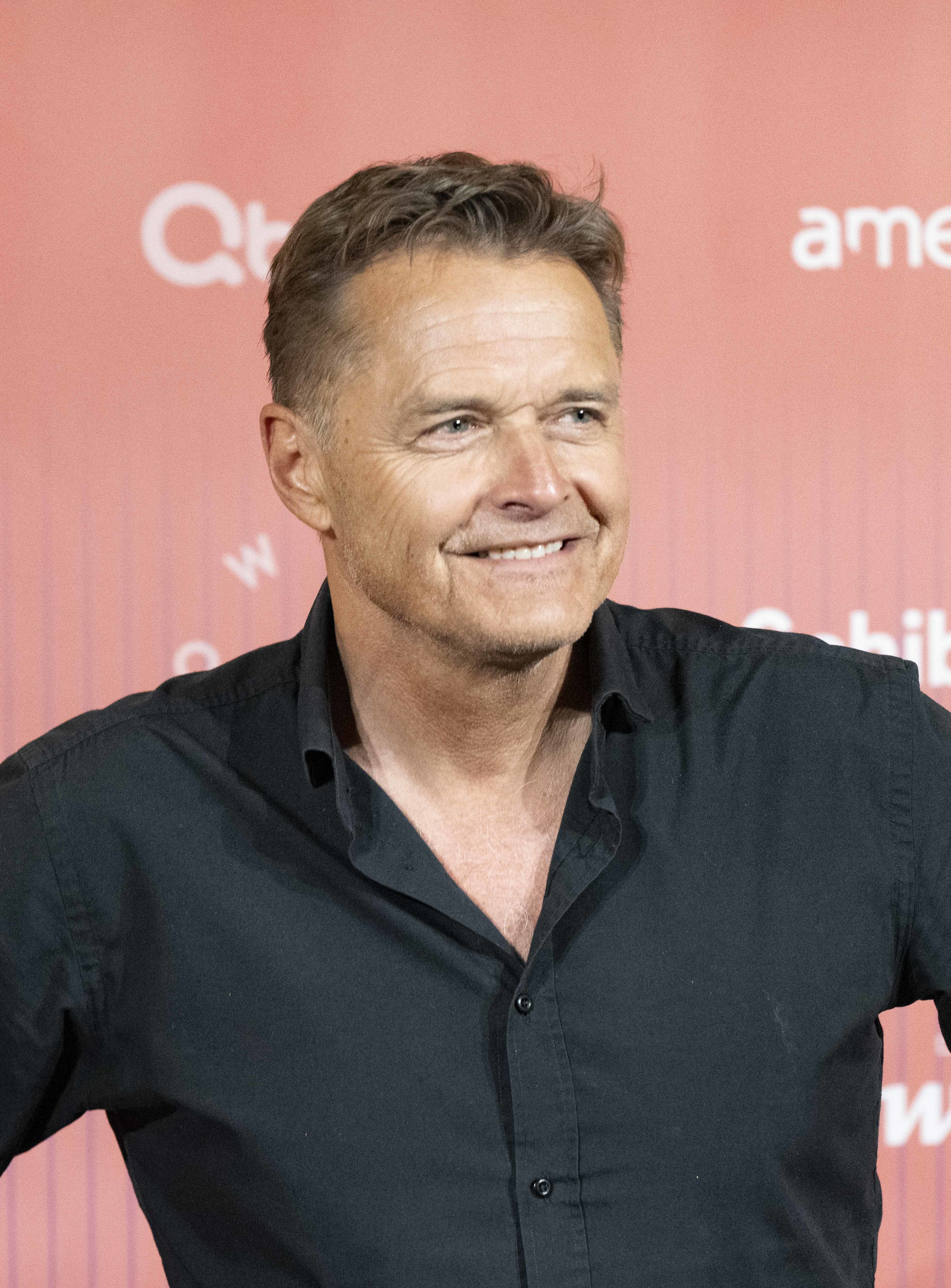
- Lauritzen in May 2021

Personal information
- Born: 12 September 1956 (age 70) Grimstad, Norway

Cycling career
- Sport: Cycling
- Discipline: Road
- Role: Rider
- Rider type: All-rounder

Amateur team
- 1998: –

Professional teams
- 1984–1986: Peugeot–Shell–Michelin
- 1987–1990: 7 Eleven
- 1991–1992: Motorola
- 1993–1994: TVM–Bison Kit

Major wins
- Nordic champion (1984, 1985); Postgirot Open, 1 stage (1986); Rund um den Henninger Turm, (1987); Redlands Bicycle Classic (1987); Tour de France, 1 stage (1987); Vuelta a España, 1 stage (1993) (Norway) National Champion (1984) (Norway) National Time Trial Champion (1990)
Medal record
Men's road bicycle racing
Representing Norway
Olympic Games
Bronze medal – third place	1984 Los Angeles	Individual Road Race

Dag Otto Lauritzen (born 13 September 1956) is a Norwegian television personality and retired professional cyclist. At the 1984 Summer Olympics in Los Angeles he won a bronze medal in the individual road race. He was the first Norwegian to win a stage of the Tour de France, which he did on Bastille Day in 1987 at Luz Ardiden. Over his career he rode the Tour de France eight times.

Lauritzen began cycling to recuperate from a military parachuting injury, and switched careers from police officer to cyclist. He won the Norwegian National Road Race Championship in 1984 and the Norwegian National Time Trial Championship in 1990.

He is now a cycling commentator on Norwegian TV station TV 2.

== Major results ==
1983
1st Road race, Nordic Road Championships
1st Team time trial, National Road Championships
1st Roserittet DNV GP
1984
1st Road race, Nordic Road Championships
1st Road race, National Road Championships
1st Stage 9 Tour of Austria
3rd Road race, Summer Olympics
1985
1st GP de Peymeinade
2nd Grand Prix d'Antibes
1986
3rd Tour du Haut Var
3rd Road race, Nordic Road Championships
6th Overall Tour of Sweden

1st Stage 7

1987
1st Rund um den Henninger-Turm
1st Stage 14 Tour de France
1st Overall Redlands Bicycle Classic

1st Stages 1, 2 & 3 (TTT)

7th La Flèche Wallonne
7th Züri-Metzgete
1988
2nd International Cycling Classic
7th Amstel Gold Race
9th Rund um den Henninger Turm
1989
1st Overall Tour de Trump
3rd Tour of Flanders
4th Giro dell'Etna
10th Overall Tour of Ireland
1990
1st Time trial, National Road Championships
1st Stage 4 Tour de Trump
3rd Trofeo Baracchi (with Sean Yates)
1991
1st Overall Ringerike GP
7th Overall Tour of Ireland
1992
1st Overall Tour of Norway

1st Stages 2, 3 & 4

1st Overall Ringerike GP
9th Grand Prix d'Isbergues
1993
1st Stage 15 Vuelta a España
1st Stage 3 Kellogg's Tour
1st Stage 1a Three Days of De Panne
7th Road race, UCI Road World Championships

=== General classification results timeline ===
Grand Tour general classification results timeline
Grand Tour	1984	1985	1986	1987	1988	1989	1990	1991	1992	1993	1994
Giro d'Italia	—	—	—	—	DNF	64	—	—	—	—	—
Tour de France	—	—	34	39	34	DNF	56	DNF	—	90	50
Vuelta a España	—	—	—	—	—	—	—	—	—	48	—

=== Major stage race general classification results timeline ===
Major stage race general classification results timeline
Race	1984	1985	1986	1987	1988	1989	1990	1991	1992	1993	1994
Paris–Nice	—	—	23	—	—	—	48	—	56	—	—
Tirreno–Adriatico	—	—	—	14	—	—	—	—	—	—	—
Critérium du Dauphiné	—	DNF	55	—	—	—	44	52	—	—	—
Tour de Suisse	—	—	—	62	—	—	36	57	61	31	—

=== Monuments and Classics results timeline ===
Monuments results timeline
	1984	1985	1986	1987	1988	1989	1990	1991	1992	1993	1994
Milan–San Remo	—	102	—	—	46	53	43	—	14	47	49
Tour of Flanders	—	—	—	17	32	3	—	—	34	18	51
Paris–Roubaix	—	—	—	30	33	—	—	80	55	—	36
Liège–Bastogne–Liège	—	—	—	13	29	38	—	63	16	60	63
Giro di Lombardia	—	—	—	—	—	—	—	34	—	62	—
Classics results timeline
	1984	1985	1986	1987	1988	1989	1990	1991	1992	1993	1994
Amstel Gold Race	—	—	—	15	7	13	—	43	35	—	—
La Flèche Wallonne	—	65	—	7	28	23	—	—	—	33	—
Gent–Wevelgem	—	56	—	87	17	27	—	126	64	—	22
Omloop Het Nieuwsblad	—	—	—	—	—	—	—	—	25	—	46
Brabantse Pijl	—	—	—	—	—	—	—	—	—	—	10
Paris–Tours	—	64	—	—	—	41	—	34	—	25	40

=== Major championships results timeline ===
Event		1984	1985	1986	1987	1988	1989	1990	1991	1992	1993	1994
Olympic Games	Time trial	Not held										
Olympic Games	Road race	3	Not held			—	Not held			—	Not held	
Road World Championships	Time trial	Not held										
Road World Championships	Road race	30	39	25	—	37	—	39	—	33	7	30
National Championships	Time trial							1				
National Championships	Road race	1										

Legend
—	Did not compete
DNF	Did not finish
DSQ	Disqualified
