= 1991 Paris–Roubaix =

- Official event poster

Race details
- Dates: 14 April 1991
- Stages: 1
- Distance: 266 km (165.3 mi)
- Winning time: 7h 8' 19"

Results
	Winner	Marc Madiot (FRA)	(RMO)
	Second	Jean-Claude Colotti (FRA)	(Tonton Tapis-GB-Corona)
	Third	Carlo Bomans (BEL)	(Weinmann-Eddy Merckx)

The 1991 Paris–Roubaix was the 89th running of the Paris–Roubaix single-day cycling race. It was held on 14 April 1991 over a distance of 267 kilometres (165.9 miles). 196 riders started the race, with only 96 finishing.

== Results ==
	Cyclist	Team	Time
1	Marc Madiot (FRA)	RMO	7h 08' 19"
2	Jean-Claude Colotti (FRA)	Tonton Tapis–GB	+ 1' 07"
3	Carlo Bomans (BEL)	Weinmann-EVS	s.t.
4	Steve Bauer (CAN)	Motorola	s.t.
5	Franco Ballerini (ITA)	Del Tongo–MG Boys	s.t.
6	Wilfried Peeters (BEL)	Histor–Sigma	s.t.
7	Nico Verhoeven (NED)	PDM–Concorde–Ultima	s.t.
8	Marc Sergeant (BEL)	Panasonic–Sportlife	s.t.
9	Olaf Ludwig (GER)	Panasonic–Sportlife	+ 1' 41"
10	Hendrik Redant (NED)	Lotto	s.t.
