= Grand Prix de la Libération =

Race details
- Region: Eindhoven, Netherlands
- English name: Liberation Grand Prix
- Discipline: Road
- Competition: UCI Road World Cup
- Type: Team time trial

History
- First edition: 1988
- Editions: 4
- Final edition: 1991

The Grand Prix de la Libération was an annual road cycling race in the Netherlands that took place in the form of a team time trial from 1988 until 1991. It was on the calendar of the UCI Road World Cup for all four editions.

== Winners ==
Year	Winner	Second	Third
1988	(Netherlands) Superconfex–Yoko–Opel–Colnago	(Belgium) Roland	(Netherlands) PDM–Ultima–Concorde
1988	Gert Jakobs (NED); Frans Maassen (NED); Jelle Nijdam (NED); Toine Poels (NED); Gerrit Solleveld (NED); Edwig Van Hooydonck (BEL)	Ronny Van Holen (BEL); John van den Akker (NED); Brian Holm (DEN); Jesper Skibby (DEN); Herman Frison (BEL); John Bogers (NED)	Frank Kersten (NED); Greg LeMond (USA); Jörg Müller (SUI); Stefan Mutter (SUI); Peter Stevenhaagen (NED); Gert-Jan Theunisse (NED)
1989	(Netherlands) TVM–Ragno	(France) Super U–Raleigh–Fiat	(Belgium) Histor–Sigma
1989	Kim Eriksen (DEN); Eddy Schurer (NED); Jesper Skibby (DEN); Martin Schalkers (NED); Peter Pieters (NED); Johan Capiot (BEL); Jean-Philippe Vandenbrande (BEL); Jacques Hanegraaf (NED)	Yves Bonnamour (FRA); Claude Seguy (FRA); Bjarne Riis (DEN); Pascal Simon (FRA); Gérard Rué (FRA); Vincent Barteau (FRA); Thierry Marie (FRA); Laurent Fignon (FRA)	Brian Holm (DEN); Wilfried Peeters (BEL); Søren Lilholt (DEN); Paul Haghedooren (BEL); Rob Harmeling (NED); Herman Frison (BEL); Etienne De Wilde (BEL); Rik Van Slycke (BEL)
1990	(Netherlands) PDM–Concorde–Ultima	(Spain) ONCE	(Netherlands) Buckler–Colnago–Decca
1990	Uwe Ampler (RDA); Uwe Raab (RDA); Seán Kelly (IRL); Gert Jakobs (NED); Erik Breukink (NED)	Melcior Mauri (ESP); Herminio Díaz Zabala (ESP); Johnny Weltz (DEN); Stephen Hodge (AUS); Marino Lejarreta (ESP)	Frans Maassen (NED); Jelle Nijdam (NED); Gerrit de Vries (NED); Eric Vanderaerden (BEL)
1991	(Netherlands) Buckler–Colnago–Decca	(Spain) ONCE	(Netherlands) Panasonic–Sportlife
1991	Edwig Van Hooydonck (BEL); Jelle Nijdam (NED); Gerrit de Vries (NED); Patrick Eyk (NED); Wilco Zuijderwijk (NED); Frans Maassen (NED)	Melcior Mauri (ESP); Herminio Díaz Zabala (ESP); Joan Llaneras (ESP); Johnny Weltz (DEN); Stephen Hodge (AUS); Marino Lejarreta (ESP)	Dimitri Zhdanov (URS); Olaf Ludwig (GER); Jacques Hanegraaf (NED); Rudy Dhaenens (BEL); Viatcheslav Ekimov (URS); Maurizio Fondriest (ITA)
