= Brian Holm =

Danish cyclist (born 1962)

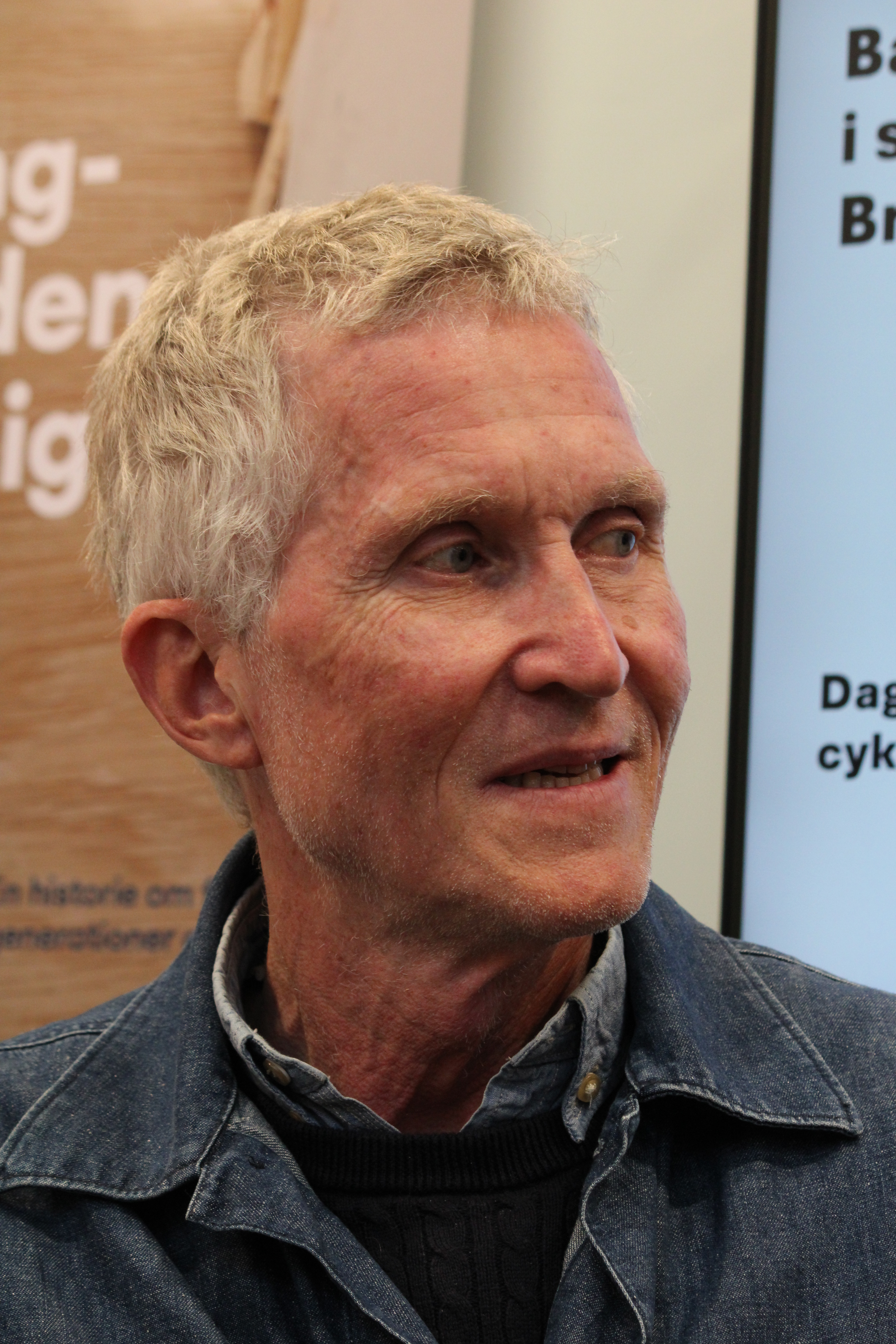
- Holm in 2025

Personal information
- Full name: Brian Holm Sørensen
- Born: 2 October 1962 (age 64) Copenhagen, Denmark
- Height: 186 cm (6 ft 1 in)

Cycling career
- Sport: Cycling
- Current team: Soudal–Quick-Step (Director sportif)
- Discipline: Road
- Role: Director sportif

Professional teams
- 1986–1988: Roland–Van de Ven
- 1989–1991: Histor–Sigma
- 1992: Tulip Computers
- 1993–1997: Team Telekom
- 1998: home–Jack & Jones
- 1998: Acceptcard Pro Cycling

Managerial teams
- 1999: Acceptcard Pro Cycling
- 2004–2011: T-Mobile Team
- 2012–: Omega Pharma–Quick-Step

Major wins
- One-day races and Classics National Road Race Championships (1990) Paris–Brussels (1991) Paris–Camembert (1991)

Brian Holm Sørensen (born 2 October 1962) is a Danish retired professional rider in road bicycle racing from 1986 to 1998, who rode for Team Telekom from 1993 to 1997 and was part of the team that brought his fellow Dane Bjarne Riis to victory in the 1996 Tour de France.

== Biography ==
Brian Holm was born in Copenhagen. He was a reliable domestique for most of his career, and also sports 11 individual victories, including a national championship (1990), the one-day classic Paris–Brussels and the semi-classic Paris–Camembert.

After his active career, Brian Holm has acted as a sport director, first for Danish pro-teams Team Acceptcard (1999) and Team Fakta, then for the Danish national team, and from 2003 for Team Telekom (sponsors changed several times) until 2011 when the team, latterly known as HTC-Highroad, came to an end.

Holm is cited as a motivational influence on prominent HTC-Highroad cyclist, Mark Cavendish. During the 2011 UCI Road World Championships in Copenhagen, won by Cavendish, he reportedly rode in the team support car with Great Britain coach Rod Ellingworth.

In February 2004 he was diagnosed with colon cancer, and underwent surgery before returning to racing. Following his experience with cancer, Holm established La Flamme Rouge, as a means to raise money for charitable organisations supporting cancer patients through sport. La Flamme Rouge sells various products such as cycle clothing designed for them by Paul Smith. Mark Cavendish is one of its ambassadors.

In November 2013 Holm was elected as a municipal councillor in Frederiksberg, a town forming an enclave in the Copenhagen Municipality, despite undertaking little campaigning. Holm stood for election as a candidate of the Conservative People's Party.

In May 2014 Holm was charged with indecent exposure towards a 7-year-old girl, who had slept over in his house. Holm was acquitted

== Doping ==
In his 2002 autobiography, he admitted having used doping during the 1990s. This did not cost him his job as manager for the Danish national team, despite some concern about him being a role model for the young riders. In May 2007, he admitted having used erythropoietin (EPO) on two occasions in 1996 at Team Telekom.

== Major results ==
1983
1st Duo Normand (with Jack Olsen)
7th Overall Tour of Sweden
1984
1st Grand Prix de la Ville de Lillers
4th UCI Amateur Road Race World Championships
9th Overall Tour of Norway
1986 – Roland
1st Circuit de la Frontiers
Templeuve
Omloop van de Grenstreek
3rd Trofeo Baracchi (with Jesper Skibby)
4th Grand Prix Pino Cerami
7th Grote Prijs Jef Scherens
1987
9th Overall Danmark Rundt
1988
2nd Grand Prix de la Libération
4th Nokere Koerse
5th Overall Danmark Rundt
1989
3rd Grand Prix de la Libération
7th Grand Prix Pino Cerami
1990 – Histor
1st Denmark National championship, individual time trial
1st GP Wieler Revue
1st Stage 4 (TTT) Paris–Nice
1st Stage 3 Tour d'Armorique
Stage 2, Tour de l'Oise
4th Grand Prix de la Libération
5th Grand Prix Eddy Merckx (with Paul Haghedooren)
6th Trofeo Luis Puig
6th Gent–Wevelgem
6th Rund um Köln
8th Grand Prix des Nations
9th Omloop Het Volk
9th Brabantse Pijl
1991 – Histor-Sigma
1st Paris–Camembert
1st Paris–Brussels
5th Grand Prix Eddy Merckx (with Benjamin Van Itterbeeck)
9th Brabantse Pijl
10th Grand Prix de la Libération
1992
2nd Omloop van de Vlaamse Scheldeboorden
4th Overall Four Days of Dunkirk
6th Grote Prijs Jef Scherens
7th Grand Prix of Aargau Canton
10th Grand Prix Eddy Merckx (with Herman Frison)
1993
5th Grand Prix de Wallonie
5th Grand Prix de Fourmies
6th Druivenkoers Overijse
6th Paris–Brussels
8th Grote 1-MeiPrijs
8th Overall Hofbräu Cup
1994
3rd Grand Prix de Denain
4th Veenendaal–Veenendaal
7th Grand Prix de Wallonie
1995 – Team Telekom
Stage 6, Boland Bank International
2nd National Road Race Championships
5th Omloop Mandel
10th Kuurne–Brussels–Kuurne
1996 – Team Telekom
3rd Dwars door België
5th Overall Tour de Luxembourg
6th Danish National Road Race Championships
7th Grand Prix Pino Cerami
7th Paris–Roubaix
7th Overall Danmark Rundt
1997 – Team Telekom
3rd E3 Prijs Vlaanderen
4th Grand Prix Herning
6th Overall Danmark Rundt
6th Tre Valli Varesine
7th Grand Prix Aarhus
1998 – Acceptcard Pro Cycling
1st Stage 3 Danmark Rundt
7th Danish National Road Race Championships
8th Ronde van Drenthe
8th Omloop Mandel
9th Overall Étoile de Bessèges

== Bibliography ==
- Smerten – glæden : erindringer fra et liv på cykel, Hovedland, Denmark, 2002. ISBN 87-7739-588-3.

An autobiography written in Danish. The title can be translated to The pain – the joy: memories of a life on the bike.

- Den sidste kilometer – En bog om at blive klogere, People's Press, Denmark, 2009, ISBN 978-87-7055-755-9.

A book in Danish about his cancer. The title can be translated to The last kilometer – A book about becoming wiser.

== See also ==
- List of doping cases in cycling
