= Eric Van Lancker =

Belgian cyclist

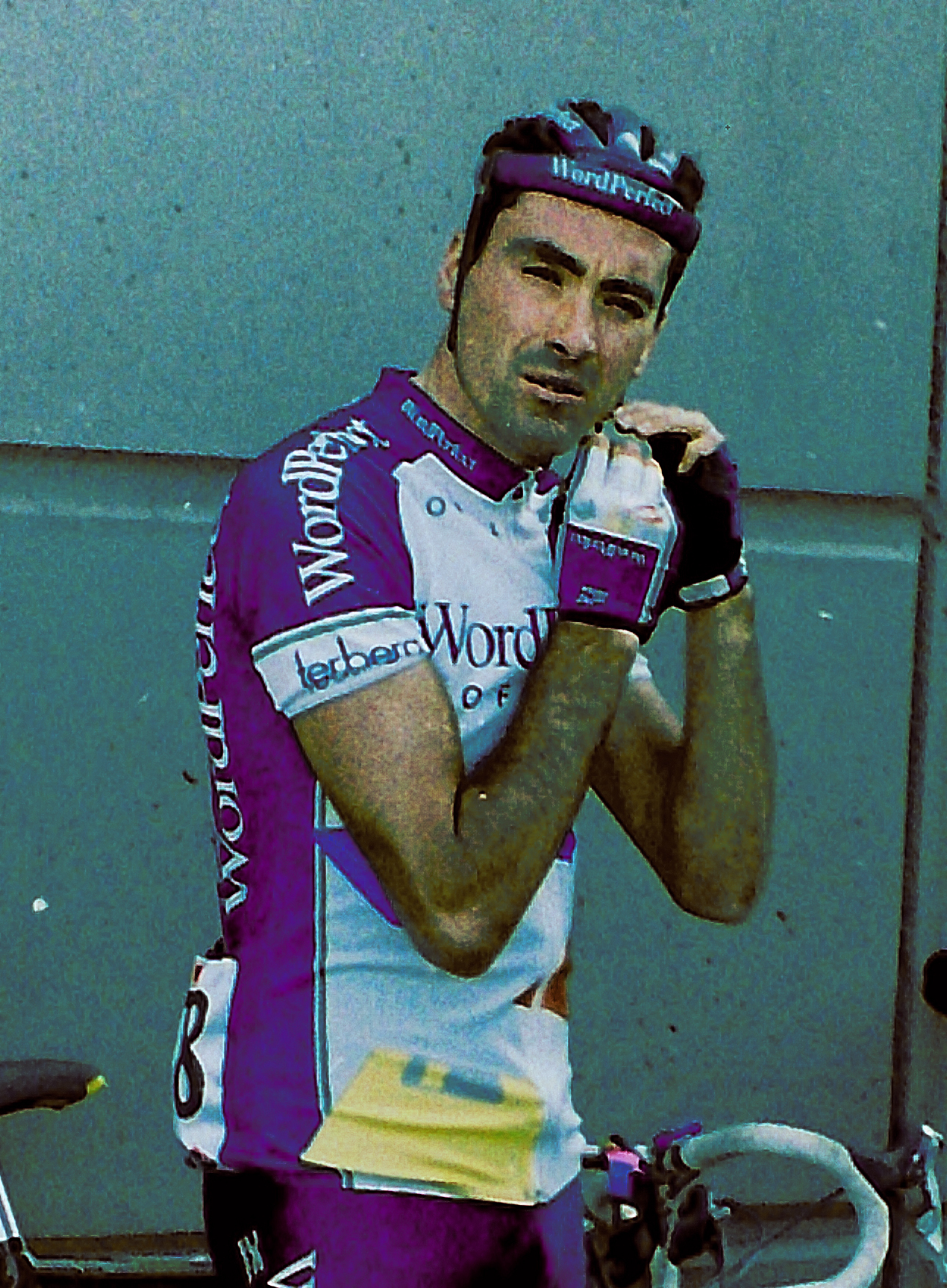
- Van Lancker in 1994

Personal information
- Full name: Eric Van Lancker
- Born: 30 April 1961 (age 65) Oudenaarde, Belgium

Cycling career
- Sport: Cycling
- Discipline: Road
- Role: Rider

Professional teams
- 1984–1985: Fangio–Marc–Ecoturbo–Mavic
- 1986–1992: Panasonic–Merckx–Agu
- 1993–1994: Festina–Lotus
- 1994: WordPerfect–Colnago–Decca
- 1995–1996: Collstrop–Lystex

Managerial teams
- 2000: Farm Frites
- 2002: U.S. Postal Service
- 2005–2006: Quick-Step–Innergetic
- 2005–2006: Quick-Step–Innergetic
- 2007: Navigators Insurance
- 2011–2016: Garmin–Cervélo

Major wins
- Grand Tours Giro d'Italia 1 individual stage (1986) One-day races and Classics Liège–Bastogne–Liège (1990) Amstel Gold Race (1989) Grand Prix des Amériques (1991) Wincanton Classic (1991)

Eric Van Lancker (born 30 April 1961 in Oudenaarde) is a Belgian former road bicycle racer. Professional from 1984 to 1996, Van Lancker was considered to be one-day race specialist. Throughout his career, he won several classics and other major races including the 1990 Liège–Bastogne–Liège, the 1989 Amstel Gold Race and a stage of the 1986 Giro d'Italia. After retiring, he worked as a team manager for several different professional teams.

== Major results ==
1983
2nd Flèche Ardennaise
8th Ronde van Vlaanderen Beloften
1984
3rd Paris–Brussels
7th Overall Tour de l'Avenir
8th GP Stad Zottegem
1985
1st Overall Milk Race

1st Stages 1 & 9

1st Stage 1 Danmark Rundt
6th Rund um den Henninger Turm
9th La Flèche Wallonne
9th Druivenkoers Overijse
1986
1st Stage 22 Giro d'Italia
1st Stage 9 Tour de Suisse
1st Stages 4a & 4b Paris–Nice
4th Overall Tour of Belgium
6th Grand Prix de Wallonie
8th Brabantse Pijl
9th Overall Tour Méditerranéen
1987
2nd Giro di Lombardia
2nd Gran Piemonte
2nd Overall Tour Méditerranéen
3rd GP de Fourmies
8th Overall GP Tell

1st Stage 5

8th Milano–Torino
1988
1st Stage 2 Vuelta a Cantabria
2nd Overall Tour of Belgium

1st Stage 1

6th Overall Volta a Catalunya
9th Overall Tour de Suisse
1989
1st Amstel Gold Race
4th Grand Prix de la Libération (TTT)
7th Overall Tour of the Basque Country

1st Stage 3

8th Dwars door België
1990
1st Liège–Bastogne–Liège
1st Stage 2 Tour de France (TTT)
2nd Overall Escalada a Montjuïc

1st Stage 1a

4th 1990 UCI Road World Cup Finale
1991
1st Grand Prix des Amériques
1st Wincanton Classic
5th Road race, National Road Championships
5th Overall Tour of Ireland
5th Liège–Bastogne–Liège
9th La Flèche Wallonne
1992
1st Stages 1 & 5 Tour du Vaucluse
5th GP Stad Zottegem
9th Japan Cup Cycle Road Race
1993
5th Overall Tour DuPont
1994
1st Bruxelles-Ingooigem
1995
2nd La Côte Picarde

=== Grand Tour general classification results timeline ===
Grand Tour	1986	1987	1988	1989	1990	1991	1992	1993	1994
Giro d'Italia	14	—	—	74	—	—	—	68	—
Tour de France	89	56	74	—	100	84	DNF	—	DNF
Vuelta a España	—	—	—	—	—	DNF	—	—	—

Legend
DSQ	Disqualified
DNF	Did not finish
