= Falk Boden =

German cyclist (born 1960)

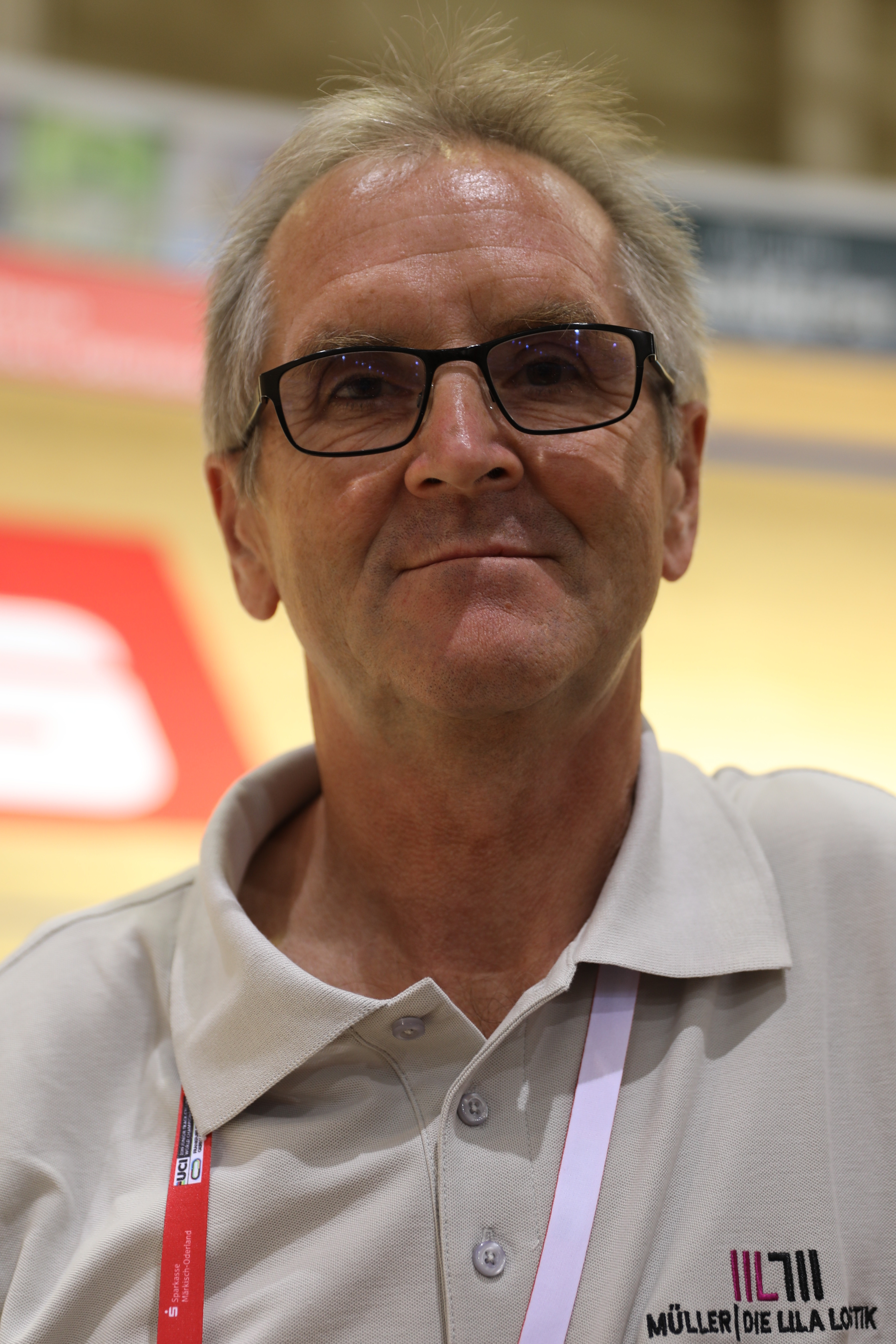
- Boden in 2019

Personal information
- Born: 20 January 1960 (age 66) Elsterwerda, East Germany
- Height: 1.83 m (6 ft 0 in)
- Weight: 74 kg (163 lb)

Cycling career
- Sport: Cycling

Professional teams
- 1991–1992: PDM–Concorde–Ultima
- 1993: Festina–Lotus
Medal record
Representing East Germany
Olympic Games
Silver medal – second place	1980 Moscow	Team time trial
Friendship Games
Gold medal – first place	1984 Schleiz	Team road race
World Championships
Gold medal – first place	1979 Valkenburg	Team time trial
Gold medal – first place	1981 Prague	Team time trial
Gold medal – first place	1989 Chambéry	Team time trial
Silver medal – second place	1990 Utsunomiya	Team time trial

Falk Boden (born 20 January 1960) is a retired German cyclist. He had his best achievements in the 100 km team time trial, in which he won a silver medal for East Germany at the 1980 Summer Olympics, as well as three gold and one silver medals at the world championships in 1979, 1981, 1989 and 1990. He missed the 1984 Summer Olympics due to their boycott by East Germany and competed in the Friendship Games instead, winning a gold medal. He won the German National Road Race in 1991.

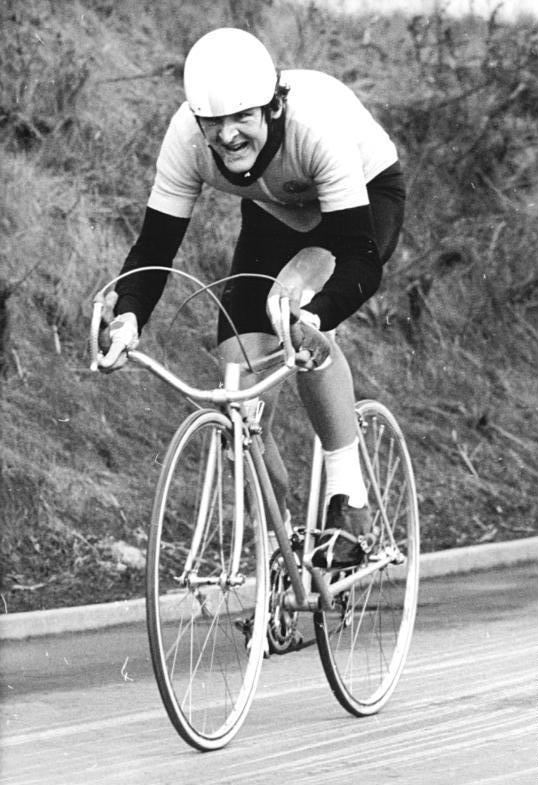
Boden in 1981

== Major results ==
1978
1st Overall Peace Race Juniors
1st Overall Cottbuser Juniors
1979
7th Overall DDR-Rundfahrt
1980
1st Overall DDR-Rundfahrt

1st Prologue (TTT) & Stage 3

3rd East German Road race championships
7th Overall Région Pays de la Loire Tour
1981
2nd East German Road race championships
3rd Overall Sealink International Grand Prix

1st Prologue, Stages 3 & 5

1982
1st Stage 4 Okolo Slovenska
2nd Overall Tour du Loir-et-Cher
5th Overall Tour de l'Avenir

1st Stage 2 (TTT)

7th Road race Amateur World Championships
1983
1st Overall Peace Race
1st Stages 4 & 8 Rheinland-Pfalz Rundfahrt
2nd Overall Tour du Maroc
6th Overall Giro delle Regioni
7th Overall DDR-Rundfahrt

1st Stage 3

8th Road race Amateur World Championships
1984
1st Overall DDR-Rundfahrt

1st Stage 7

2nd Overall Olympia's Tour
3rd East German Road race championships
4th Overall Tour de Normandie

1st Stage 5

1985 (1 Pro win)
1st Stage 7 Tour de Wallonie
4th Overall Peace Race
10th Overall DDR-Rundfahrt
1987 (2)
5th Overall DDR-Rundfahrt
8th Overall Tour de Wallonie

1st Stages 2 & 3 (TTT)

8th Overall Tour of Sweden
1988 (1)
1st Stage 5 Tour du Vaucluse
1st Stage 5 Tour of Austria
2nd East German Road race championships
3rd Overall Tour d'Algérie
1989 (1)
1st Overall Regio-Tour
1st Prologue Tour du Vaucluse
5th Overall Tour of Austria

1st Stages 8 & 9

7th Overall Région Pays de la Loire Tour
10th Grand Prix de Waregem
1990
4th Overall Peace Race
7th Road race Amateur World Championships
9th Overall Troféu Joaquim Agostinho
1991
1st Road race national championships
4th Grand Prix de la Libération
8th Züri-Metzgete
9th Paris-Camembert
9th GP Montreal
1993
3rd Coca-Cola Trophy
