= Jan Goessens =

Belgian cyclist

Personal information
- Born: 20 October 1962 (age 63) Ghent, Belgium

Cycling career
- Sport: Cycling
- Current team: Retired
- Discipline: Road
- Role: Rider
- Rider type: Road racing

Jan Goessens (born 20 October 1962 in Ghent) is a retired road racing cyclist from Belgium, who was a professional rider from 1986 to 1993, for mainly smaller teams. He was part of Tour de France.

== Tour de France record ==
- 1987 - 131st overall
- 1989 - 112th overall
- 1990 - 114th overall
- 1991 - retired
