= Frans Maassen =

Dutch cyclist

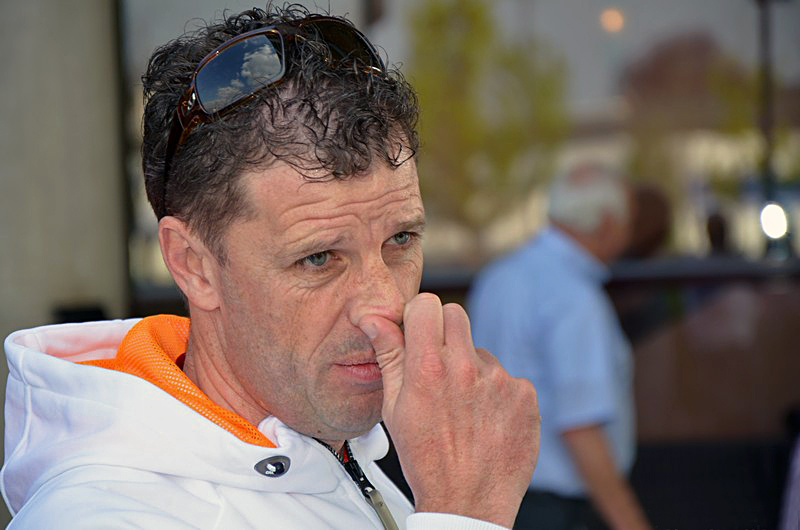

Personal information
- Full name: Franciscus Albertus Antonius; Johannes Maassen
- Born: 27 January 1965 (age 61) Haelen, the Netherlands

Cycling career
- Sport: Cycling
- Discipline: Road
- Role: Rider

Professional teams
- 1987–1989: Superconfext
- 1990–1992: Buckler
- 1993–1994: WordPerfect
- 1995: Novell

Franciscus ("Frans") Albertus Antonius Johannes Maassen (born 27 January 1965 in Haelen, Limburg) is a directeur sportif. He was a professional road racing cyclist between 1987 and 1995. He completed seven Tour de France stage races, including the 1990 Tour de France where he was involved in the Stage 1 breakaway that caused the rest of the race to be the most surprising Tour in over a decade. He was the only one of the four breakaway riders not to wear the maillot jaune, but he won the stage. He twice won the Tour of Belgium, and won the 1994 Tour de Luxembourg.

Since 2005, Maassen has been the assistant directeur sportif of the Rabobank, a Netherlands-based UCI ProTour team.

== Major results ==
1986
1st Liège–Bastogne–Liège Espoirs
2nd Overall Tour of Sweden
1987
1st Stage 2 Danmark Rundt
2nd GP du Canton d'Argovie
7th Brussels–Ingooigem
8th Tour Méditerranéen
1988
1st Overall Tour of Belgium

1st Stages 3a & 3b (ITT)

1st Prologue Étoile de Bessèges
1st Stage 2 Volta a la Comunitat Valenciana
1st Stage 4a Tour de Romandie
1st Stage 6a Critérium du Dauphiné Libéré
3rd Overall Three Days of De Panne
6th Overall Tour of Sweden
1989
1st Road race, National Road Championships
1st Wincanton Classic
2nd Overall Tour of Belgium

1st Stage 3b (ITT)

2nd Milan–San Remo
3rd Overall Étoile de Bessèges
4th UCI Road World Cup
4th De Brabantse Pijl
1990
1st Overall Tour of Belgium

1st Prologue & Stage 5a (ITT)

1st Overall Étoile de Bessèges

1st Stage 6 (ITT)

1st De Brabantse Pijl
1st Grand Prix Eddy Merckx
1st Grand Prix de Fourmies
1st Stage 1 Tour de France
2nd Overall Tour of Sweden

1st Stages 2 & 3

3rd Druivenkoers Overijse
4th Gent–Wevelgem
6th Overall Nissan Classic
7th Overall Tirreno–Adriatico
9th Rund um den Henninger Turm
1991
1st Overall Ronde van Nederland

1st Stage 2b (ITT)

1st Amstel Gold Race
1st Stage 5b Volta a la Comunitat Valenciana
2nd Overall Three Days of De Panne
2nd Overall Tour de Luxembourg
2nd Grand Prix Eddy Merckx
3rd Overall Étoile de Bessèges
3rd Grand Prix Pino Cerami
4th Overall Four Days of Dunkirk

1st Stage 5

5th Tour of Flanders
5th Circuit des Frontières
6th UCI Road World Cup
6th Grand Prix des Nations
10th Wincanton Classic
1992
1st Overall Three Days of De Panne
Tour de Luxembourg

1st Stages 2 & 3b (ITT)

1st Stage 3 Grand Prix du Midi Libre
2nd Overall Four Days of Dunkirk

1st Stage 4 (ITT)

2nd Paris–Brussels
2nd Grand Prix Eddy Merckx
2nd Grand Prix Pino Cerami
3rd Rund um den Henninger Turm
5th Tour of Flanders
5th GP Ouest–France
8th Paris–Tours
1993
1st Grote Prijs Jef Scherens
1st Stage 4 Grand Prix du Midi Libre
1st Stage 6 Vuelta a Andalucía
2nd Overall Three Days of De Panne
2nd Tour of Flanders
2nd Circuit des Frontières
3rd Road race, National Road Championships
5th De Brabantse Pijl
6th Overall Tour de Luxembourg
7th Rund um den Henninger Turm
10th Road race, UCI Road World Championships
1994
1st Overall Tour de Luxembourg

1st Stage 3b (ITT)

3rd Overall Three Days of De Panne

1st Stage 3b (ITT)

3rd Veenendaal–Veenendaal Classic
1995
1st Profronde van Heerlen
2nd Time trial, National Road Championships
2nd Rund um Köln
6th Overall Ronde van Nederland

Sporting positions
Preceded by Peter Pieters	Dutch National Road Race Champion; 1989	Succeeded by Peter Winnen
