= Edwig Van Hooydonck =

Belgian cyclist (born 1966)

Personal information
- Full name: Edwig Van Hooydonck
- Born: 4 August 1966 (age 60) Ekeren, Belgium

Cycling career
- Sport: Cycling
- Current team: Retired
- Discipline: Road
- Role: Rider
- Rider type: Classics specialist

Professional team
- 1986–1996: Kwantum–Decosol–Yoko

Major wins
- Grand Tours Vuelta a España 1 Individual stage (1992) One-day races and Classics Tour of Flanders (1989, 1991) Brabantse Pijl (1987, 1991, 1993, 1995)

Edwig Van Hooydonck (born 4 August 1966) is a former professional road racing cyclist from Belgium. He won the prestigious Tour of Flanders twice and Brabantse Pijl a record four times.

== Career ==
From Gooreind, Wuustwezel, Van Hooydonck was a striking image on the bike with a 6’4” frame and red hair. He was a success from a young age, winning 30 out of 31 races in one junior season. He was signed by racing manager Jan Raas while still a teenager, and as a 20-year-old in 1987 won Brabantse Pijl, three months into his professional career. He made his debut that year at the Tour of Flanders, finishing 27th but placed fifth as a debutant at 1987 Paris-Roubaix.

Van Hooydonck won the 1989 Tour of Flanders at the age of 22 years-old, the youngest Belgian winner of the race crying with emotion at the finish line, which he later described as "joy and suffering". He also went on to earn a podium place with third overall that year at the 1989 Paris-Roubaix race.

In 1990, he placed second at the 1990 Omloop Het Volk, the first classic race in Belgium of the season. He then placed third at Paris-Roubaix behind Steve Bauer and Eddy Planckaert.

Having placed third at the 1991 Omloop Het Volk, Van Hooydonck won the Tour of Flanders again in 1991. His prowess on the Bosberg climb on the race led him to be nicknamed "Eddy Bosberg". His attack on the climb that year earned him the victory by 45 seconds over Johan Museeuw and Rolf Sørensen.

In stage races, he wins included a stage of the 1992 Vuelta a España, as well as wins in the Tour of Romandie and Tour of Luxembourg in 1993. Van Hooydonck won the Brabantse Pijl four times throughout his career with his fourth victory at the 1995 edition setting a new record number of victories in the race, surpassing the previous record holder Johan Capiot.

Shortly prior to his retirement in 1996 he placed second at 1996 Dwars door België and Brabantse Pijl, but retired from racing in May 1996 aged 29 years-old. Van Hooydonck retired from professional cycling because he felt he could no longer compete with other cyclists, who were at the time starting to dope themselves, without himself cheating too. At this time Erythropoietin (EPO) was becoming a widely used doping agent in the sport. Speaking in 2015, his former rival Johan Museeuw said "in my time, maybe two per cent of riders didn’t take EPO, Edwig van Hooydonck is one of them.”

One minor innovation in cycling credited to Van Hooydonk are three quarter length bibshorts. After he had aggravated a knee problem during the 1989 Tour of Flanders, he had cycling shorts made that stretched below the knee, as an alternative to bandaging the knee.

== Personal life ==
He is the uncle of former professional cyclist Nathan Van Hooydonck.

== Major results ==
1984
1st Road race, National Junior Road Championships
1985
7th Paris–Roubaix Espoirs
1986
1st Ronde Van Vlaanderen Beloften
2nd Paris–Troyes
3rd Flèche Ardennaise
5th Overall Circuit de la Sarthe
1987
1st Brabantse Pijl
2nd Grand Prix Eddy Merckx
3rd Le Samyn
5th Overall Ronde van Nederland

1st Stage 5 (TTT)

5th Overall Classic Brugge–De Panne
5th Paris–Roubaix
5th Züri-Metzgete
10th Grand Prix des Nations
10th Nokere Koerse
1988
1st Overall Vuelta a Andalucía

1st Prologue

1st Grand Prix Eddy Merckx
3rd Overall Tour of Sweden
4th Overall Tour Méditerranéen

1st Stage 3

4th Brabantse Pijl
5th Overall Tirreno–Adriatico
8th Firenze–Pistoia
10th Rund um den Henninger Turm Frankfurt
1989
1st Tour of Flanders
1st Kuurne–Brussels–Kuurne
1st Grand Prix de Denain
2nd Grand Prix Eddy Merckx
3rd Paris–Roubaix
4th Druivenkoers Overijse
5th Circuit des Frontières
5th Rund um den Henninger Turm Frankfurt
7th Brabantse Pijl
8th Overall Classic Brugge–De Panne
1990
1st Dwars door België
2nd Road race, National Road Championships
2nd Omloop Het Volk
3rd Paris–Roubaix
4th Druivenkoers Overijse
7th Brabantse Pijl
1991
1st Tour of Flanders
1st Brabantse Pijl
1st Grand Prix d'Ouverture La Marseillaise
1st Schaal Sels
1st Grand Prix de la Libération (TTT)
3rd Omloop Het Volk
3rd Grand Prix Eddy Merckx
4th Nationale Sluitingsprijs
5th Züri-Metzgete
9th Overall Tour de l'Oise
9th Liège–Bastogne–Liège
9th Circuit des Frontières
9th Grand Prix des Amériques
1992
1st Grand Prix de Denain
1st Grand Prix d'Ouverture La Marseillaise
1st Stage 6 Vuelta a España
1st Stage 3 (ITT) Étoile de Bessèges
3rd Tour of Flanders
4th Overall Tour of Ireland

1st Stage 3

4th Brabantse Pijl
7th Grand Prix de Wallonie
10th Liège–Bastogne–Liège
10th Paris–Tours
1993
1st Brabantse Pijl
1st Stage 2 Tour de Romandie
1st Stage 3b (ITT) Tour de Luxembourg
2nd Overall Vuelta a Andalucía
3rd Overall Tour de l'Oise
3rd Overall Classic Brugge–De Panne
3rd Nationale Sluitingsprijs
5th Druivenkoers Overijse
6th Paris–Roubaix
7th Tour of Flanders
8th Grand Prix des Nations
1994
4th Road race, National Road Championships
5th Brabantse Pijl
8th Tour du Haut Var
8th Grand Prix Eddy Merckx
9th Tour of Flanders
9th Druivenkoers Overijse
1995
1st Brabantse Pijl
2nd Omloop Het Volk
2nd Binche–Chimay–Binche
3rd Clásica de Almería
3rd Druivenkoers Overijse
5th Overall Vuelta a Murcia
7th Grand Prix Eddy Merckx
1996
2nd Brabantse Pijl
2nd Dwars door België
5th Omloop Het Volk
9th Trofeo Laigueglia
