= RMO (cycling team) =

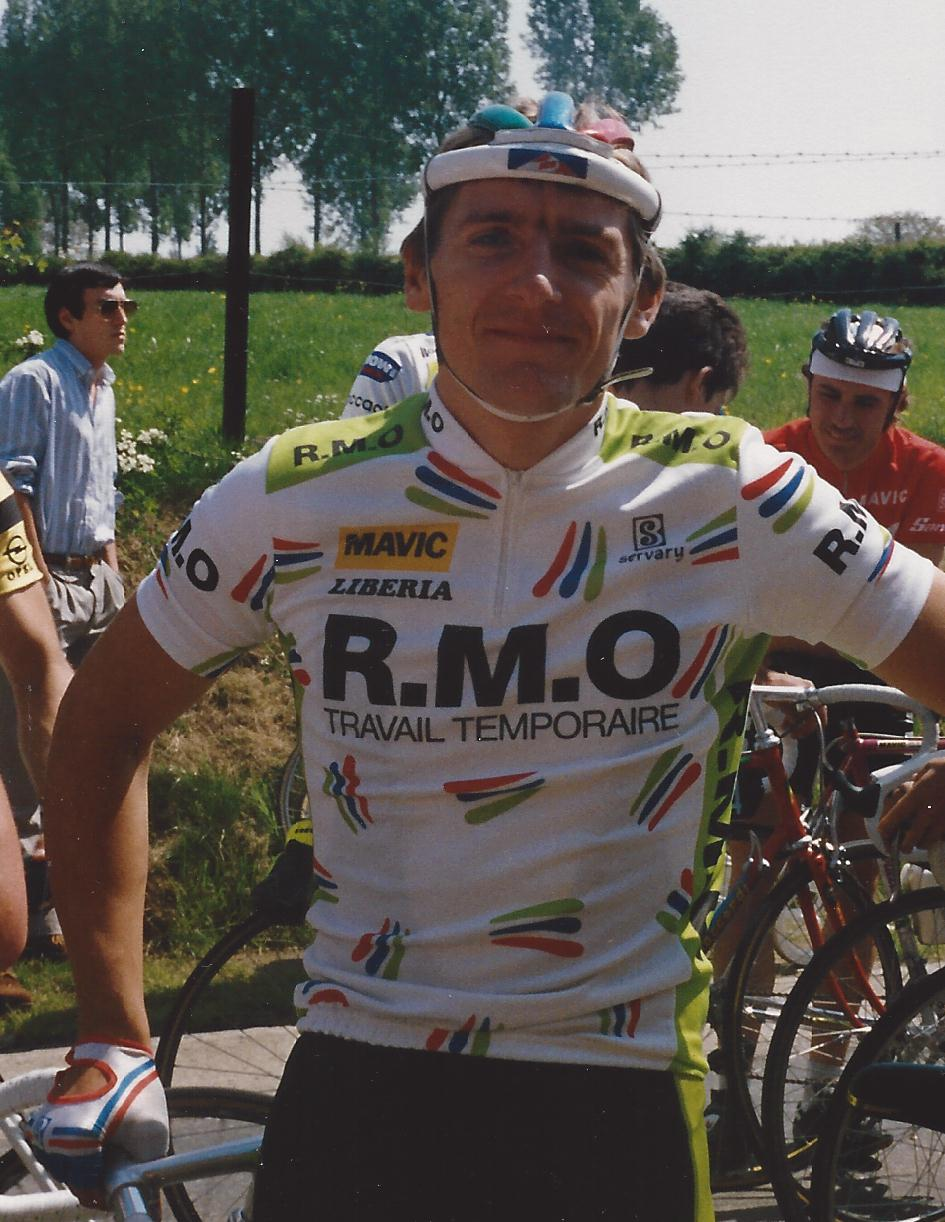
- Michel Vermote c. 1988–1989

Team information
- Registered: France
- Founded: 1986
- Disbanded: 1992
- Discipline: Road

Team name history
- 1986–1988 1989–1992 1992: RMO–Cycles Méral–Mavic; RMO; RMO–Onet

RMO (Relation Main d'Oeuvre) was a French professional cycling team that existed from 1986 to 1992. Its main sponsor was French supplier of temporary workers Relation Main d'Oeuvre. Its most notable results were the mountains classification of the 1990 Tour de France with Thierry Claveyrolat and the 1991 Paris–Roubaix with Marc Madiot.
