= Dirk De Wolf =

Belgian cyclist

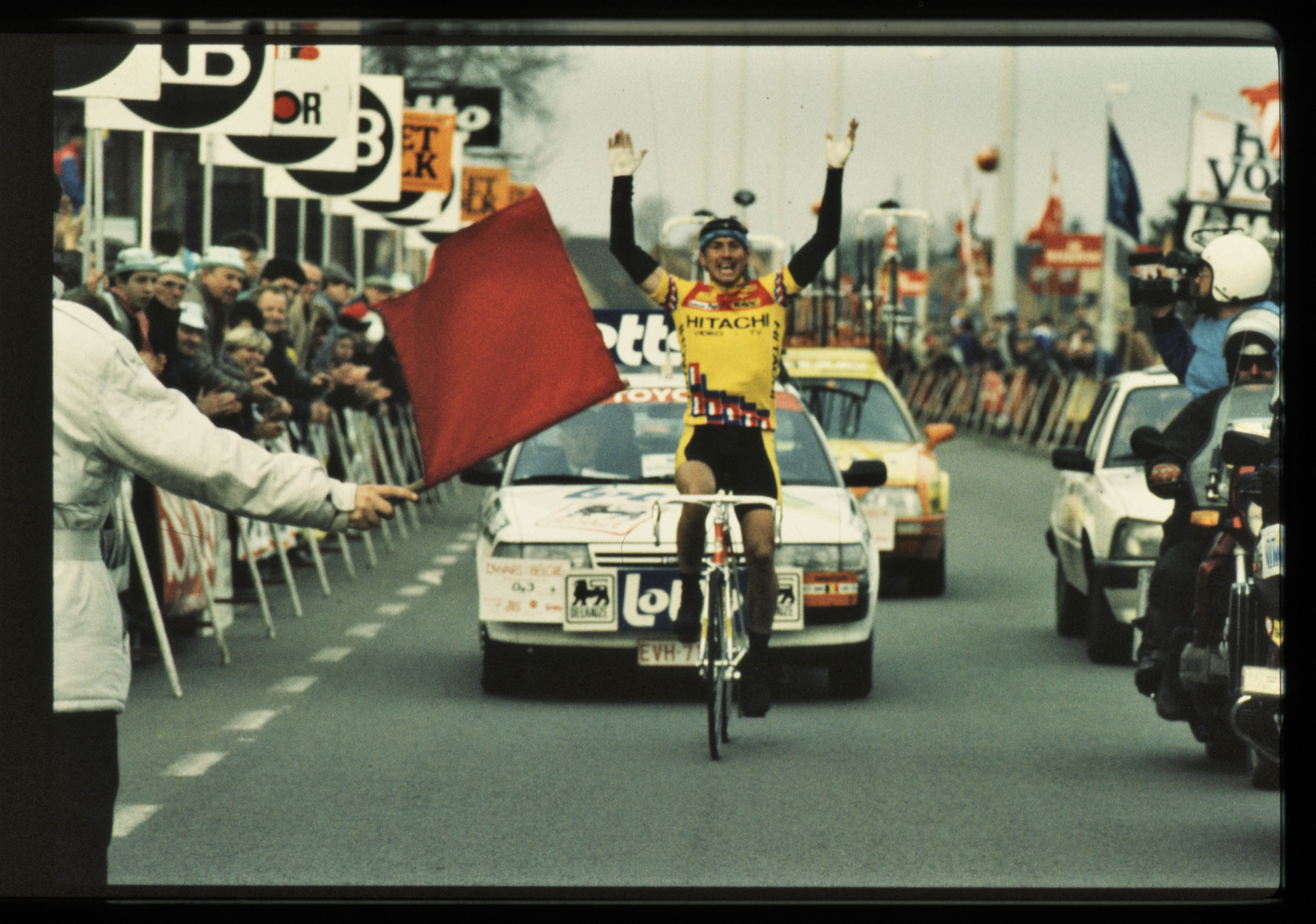
- De Wolf winning the 1989 Dwars door België

Personal information
- Born: 16 January 1961 (age 65) Aalst, Belgium

Cycling career
- Sport: Cycling
- Current team: Retired
- Role: Rider

Professional teams
- 1983: Boule d'Or
- 1984: Kwantum Hallen-Yoko
- 1985–1989: Hitachi
- 1990: PDM
- 1991: Tonton Tapis
- 1992–1993: Gatorade
- 1994: Novemail–Histor–Laser Computer

Major wins
- Liège–Bastogne–Liège (1992)
Medal record
Men's road bicycle racing
Representing Belgium
World Championships
Silver medal – second place	1990 Utsunomiya	Professional race

Dirk De Wolf (born 16 January 1961) is a former professional road racing cyclist from Belgium.

== Cycling career ==
In 1982 at the age of 23 De Wolf won the Sealink International and finished 8th at the World Road Championships. The following season he turned professional for the Belgium team Boule d'Or. In his first season as a professional he won a stage in Paris–Nice. In 1984 he joined the Dutch team Kwantum Hallen-Yoko riding alongside Joop Zoetemelk. and Adri van der Poel. After just one season he then joined Hitachi riding alongside Roger De Vlaeminck. In his second season with Hitachi he won Four Days of Dunkirk. In 1989 De Wolf finished second in the Paris–Roubaix classic behind fellow Belgian, Jean-Marie Wampers. After five seasons with Hitachi De Wolf moved to PDM in 1990 and was second in the UCI Road World Championships. The race in Japan went to the final lap of the nine-mile course which resulted in De Wolf being beaten by Rudy Dhaenens in a photo finish. In 1991 he then joined Tonton Tapis riding alongside Stephen Roche. In 1991 he won the Giro dell'Appennino and finished third in the Amstel Gold Race. In 1992 he then joined Gatorade riding alongside Laurent Fignon. In his first season with Gatorade he won Liège–Bastogne–Liège. After two seasons with Gatorade he then joined the French team Novemail, retiring at the end of the 1994 season.

He participated in the Tour de France five times, however his best overall finish was a disappointing 66th as his talents were better suited to one-day classics than to long stage races

== Major results ==
1982
1st Overall, Sealink International
1st, Seraing-Aachen-Seraing
4th, Paris–Roubaix (Amateur)
8th, World Road Championships (Amateur)
1983
1st, Stage 6, Paris–Nice
1985
1st, Strombeek-Bever
1986
1st Overall, Four Days of Dunkirk

1st Stage 1, Four Days of Dunkirk

1987
1st, Wommelgem
1989
1st, Dwars door Vlaanderen
2nd, Paris–Roubaix
1st, Moorsele
1st, Rummen
1990
1st, Druivenkoers Overijse
2nd UCI Road World Championships
1st, Purnode
1st, Sadirac
1st, Liedekerkse Pijl
1991
1st, Giro dell'Appennino
1st, Stage 6, Tirreno–Adriatico
3rd, Amstel Gold Race
7th, UCI Road World Championships
1992
1st, Liège–Bastogne–Liège
1st, Stage 1a, Three Days of De Panne
1st, Aalst
