= Herman Frison =

Belgian cyclist

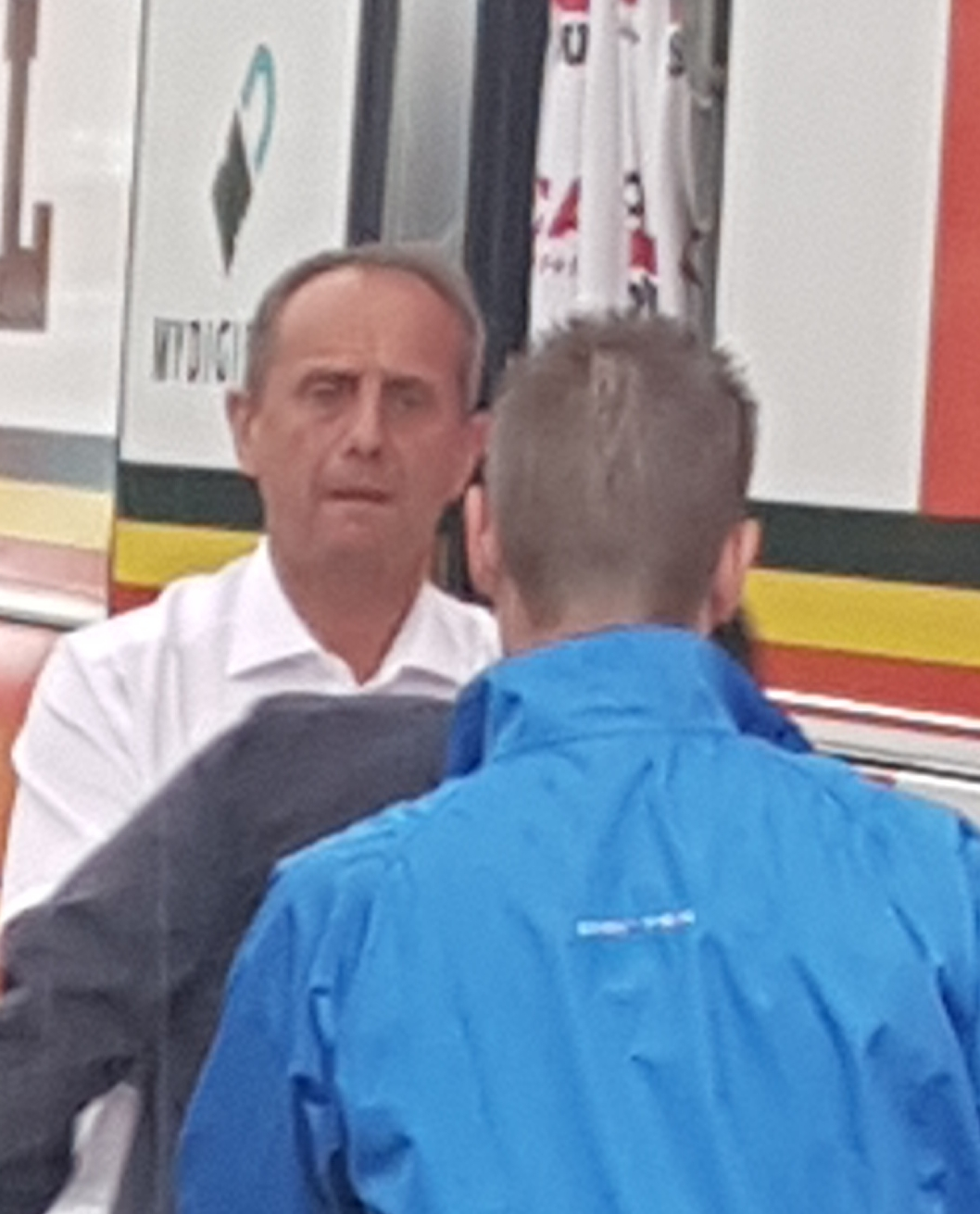

Personal information
- Full name: Herman Frison
- Born: 16 April 1961 (age 65) Geel, Belgium

Cycling career
- Sport: Cycling
- Current team: Retired
- Discipline: Road
- Role: Rider

Major wins
- 1 stage 1987 Tour de France; 1990 Gent–Wevelgem

Herman Frison (born 16 April 1961) is Belgian former professional road bicycle racer and former assistant manager at Lotto-Soudal. During the 1987 Tour de France he managed to go on a solo attack during a relatively short stage that took place entirely within West Germany. Stage 4 was only about 80 km long and went from Stuttgart to Pforzheim, but Frison managed to stay away from the peloton and win the stage by about a minute and a half ahead of the main field.

== Major results ==
1984
Booischot
1985
Tongerlo
1986
GP Stad Vilvoorde
Leeuwse Pijl
Chaumont - Gistoux
1987
Peer
Four Days of Dunkirk
Tour de France:

Winner stage 4

Grote 1-Mei Prijs
1988
Polder-Kempen
Kalmthout
Humbeek
Geetbets
1989
Omloop Hageland-Zuiderkempen
Sint-Katelijne-Waver
Viane
1990
Nokere Koerse
Gent–Wevelgem
1991
Nationale Sluitingsprijs
Wetteren
1992
Wavre
Dilsen
1993
Druivenkoers Overijse
1994
Heusden O-Vlaanderen
