= Carlo Bomans =

Belgian cyclist (born 1963)

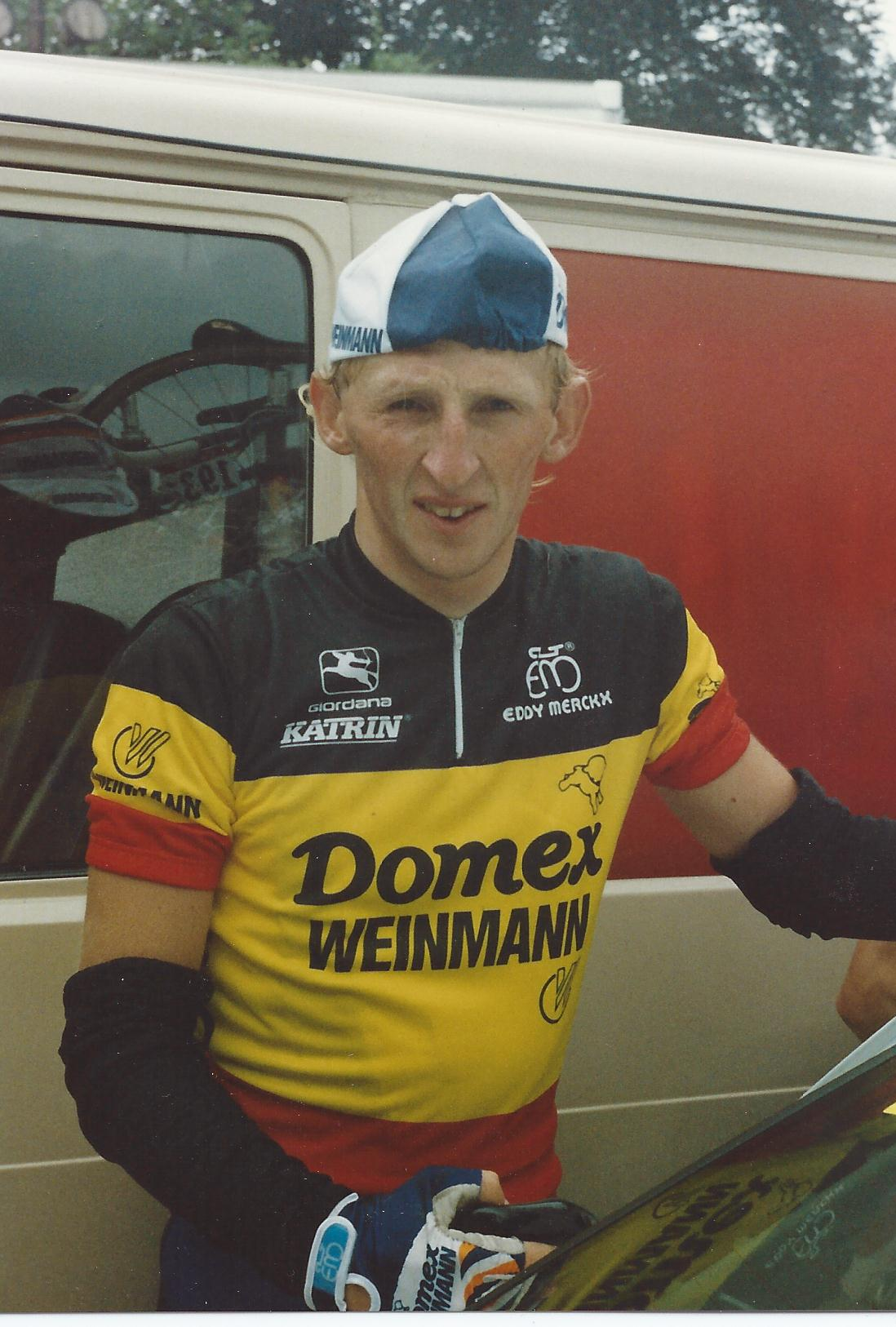
- Bomans in 1989

Personal information
- Full name: Carlo Bomans
- Born: 10 June 1963 (age 63) Bree, Belgium

Cycling career
- Sport: Cycling
- Discipline: Road
- Role: Rider

Professional teams
- 1986–1988: Lotto–Emerxil–Merckx
- 1989–1991: Weinmann
- 1992–1997: GB–MG Maglificio
- 1998: Palmans-Ideal

Major wins
- Paris–Troyes (1984); Druivenkoers Overijse (1989); Dwars door Vlaanderen (1994); E3 Harelbeke (1996)

Carlo Bomans (born 10 June 1963) is a Belgian former racing cyclist. He competed in the individual road race event at the 1984 Summer Olympics. In October 2005 he succeeded José De Cauwer as coach of the Belgian national cycling team. As coach of the Belgian national cycling team he won the world championship cycling in 2012 with Philippe Gilbert.
