= 1997 UCI Road World Cup =

- Ninth edition of the UCI Road World Cup

Details
- Dates: 22 March – 18 October 1997
- Location: Europe
- Races: 10

Champions
- Individual champion: Michele Bartoli (ITA) (MG Maglificio–Technogym)
- Teams' champion: Française des Jeux

The 1997 UCI Road World Cup was the ninth edition of the UCI Road World Cup. It was won by Italian classics specialist Michele Bartoli of the MG Maglificio–Technogym team.

== Races ==
Date	Race	Country	Winner	Team	World Cup Leader	Leader's Team	Report
22 March	Milan–San Remo	Italy	Erik Zabel (GER)	Team Telekom	Erik Zabel (GER)	Team Telekom	Report
6 April	Tour of Flanders	Belgium	Rolf Sørensen (DEN)	Rabobank	Rolf Sørensen (DEN)	Rabobank	Report
13 April	Paris–Roubaix	France	Frédéric Guesdon (FRA)	Française des Jeux	Rolf Sørensen (DEN)	Rabobank	Report
20 April	Liège–Bastogne–Liège	Belgium	Michele Bartoli (ITA)	MG Maglificio–Technogym	Michele Bartoli (ITA)	MG Maglificio–Technogym	Report
26 April	Amstel Gold Race	Netherlands	Bjarne Riis (DEN)	Team Telekom	Michele Bartoli (ITA)	MG Maglificio–Technogym	Report
9 August	Clásica de San Sebastián	Spain	Davide Rebellin (ITA)	Française des Jeux	Rolf Sørensen (DEN)	Rabobank	Report
17 August	Rochester International Classic	United Kingdom	Andrea Tafi (ITA)	Mapei–GB	Rolf Sørensen (DEN)	Rabobank	Report
24 August	Grand Prix de Suisse	Switzerland	Davide Rebellin (ITA)	Française des Jeux	Rolf Sørensen (DEN)	Rabobank	Report
5 October	Paris–Tours	France	Andrei Tchmil (UKR)	Lotto–Mobistar–Isoglass	Rolf Sørensen (DEN)	Rabobank	Report
18 October	Giro di Lombardia	Italy	Laurent Jalabert (FRA)	ONCE	Michele Bartoli (ITA)	MG Maglificio–Technogym	Report

== Single races details ==
worldcupjersey	Denotes the Classification Leader

In the race results the leader jersey identify the rider who wore the jersey in the race (the leader at the start of the race).

In the general classification table the jersey identify the leader after the race.

22 March 1997 — Milan–San Remo 294 km (182.7 mi)

	Rider	Team	Time
1	Erik Zabel (GER)	Team Telekom	6h 57' 47"
2	Alberto Elli (ITA)	Casino	s.t.
3	Biagio Conte (ITA)	Scrigno–Gaerne	s.t.
4	Francesco Casagrande (ITA)	Saeco–Estro	s.t.
5	Michele Bartoli (ITA)	MG Maglificio–Technogym	s.t.
6	Mirko Celestino (ITA)	Team Polti	s.t.
7	Serguei Outschakov (UKR)	Team Polti	s.t.
8	Rolf Sørensen (DEN)	Rabobank	s.t.
9	Andrea Ferrigato (ITA)	Roslotto–ZG Mobili	s.t.
10	Andrea Noè (ITA)	Asics–CGA	s.t.

General classification after Milan–San Remo

	Rider	Team	Points
1	Erik Zabel (GER)	Team Telekom	100
2	Alberto Elli (ITA)	Casino	70
3	Biagio Conte (ITA)	Scrigno–Gaerne	50
4	Francesco Casagrande (ITA)	Saeco–Estro	40
5	Michele Bartoli (ITA)	MG Maglificio–Technogym	36
6	Mirko Celestino (ITA)	Team Polti	32
7	Serguei Outschakov (UKR)	Team Polti	28
8	Rolf Sørensen (DEN)	Rabobank	24
9	Andrea Ferrigato (ITA)	Roslotto–ZG Mobili	20
10	Andrea Noè (ITA)	Asics–CGA	16

6 April 1997 — Tour of Flanders 256 km (159.1 mi)

	Rider	Team	Time
1	Rolf Sørensen (DEN)	Rabobank	5h 57' 01"
2	Frédéric Moncassin (FRA)	GAN	+ 7"
3	Franco Ballerini (ITA)	Mapei–GB	+ 8"
4	Andrei Tchmil (UKR)	Lotto–Mobistar–Isoglass	s.t.
5	Davide Casarotto (ITA)	Scrigno–Gaerne	+ 20"
6	Claudio Chiappucci (ITA)	Asics–CGA	+ 21"
7	Michele Bartoli (ITA)	MG Maglificio–Technogym	+ 27"
8	Jo Planckaert (BEL)	Lotto–Mobistar–Isoglass	s.t.
9	Peter Van Petegem (BEL)	TVM–Farm Frites	s.t.
10	Viatcheslav Ekimov (RUS)	U.S. Postal Service	s.t.

General classification after Tour of Flanders

	Rider	Team	Points
1	Rolf Sørensen (DEN)	Rabobank	124
2	Erik Zabel (GER)	Team Telekom	100
3	Frédéric Moncassin (FRA)	GAN	70
4	Alberto Elli (ITA)	Casino	70
5	Michele Bartoli (ITA)	MG Maglificio–Technogym	64
6	Davide Casarotto (ITA)	Scrigno–Gaerne	51
7	Franco Ballerini (ITA)	Mapei–GB	50
8	Biagio Conte (ITA)	Scrigno–Gaerne	50
9	Andrei Tchmil (UKR)	Lotto–Mobistar–Isoglass	40
10	Francesco Casagrande (ITA)	Saeco–Estro	40

13 April 1997 — Paris–Roubaix 266.5 km (165.6 mi)

	Rider	Team	Time
1	Frédéric Guesdon (FRA)	Française des Jeux	6h 38' 10"
2	Jo Planckaert (BEL)	Lotto–Mobistar–Isoglass	s.t.
3	Johan Museeuw (BEL)	Mapei–GB	s.t.
4	Andrei Tchmil (UKR)	Lotto–Mobistar–Isoglass	s.t.
5	Davide Casarotto (ITA)	Scrigno–Gaerne	s.t.
6	Rolf Sørensen (DEN)	Rabobank	s.t.
7	Marc Wauters (BEL)	Lotto–Mobistar–Isoglass	s.t.
8	Frédéric Moncassin (FRA)	GAN	s.t.
9	Rolf Aldag (GER)	Team Telekom	+ 14"
10	Henk Vogels (AUS)	GAN	+ 25"

General classification after Paris–Roubaix

	Rider	Team	Points
1	Rolf Sørensen (DEN)	Rabobank	124
2	Frédéric Guesdon (FRA)	Française des Jeux	100
3	Erik Zabel (GER)	Team Telekom	100
4	Jo Planckaert (BEL)	Lotto–Mobistar–Isoglass	94
5	Frédéric Moncassin (FRA)	GAN	94
6	Davide Casarotto (ITA)	Scrigno–Gaerne	87
7	Andrei Tchmil (UKR)	Lotto–Mobistar–Isoglass	80
8	Alberto Elli (ITA)	Casino	70
9	Michele Bartoli (ITA)	MG Maglificio–Technogym	64
10	Johan Museeuw (BEL)	Mapei–GB	63

20 April 1997 — Liège–Bastogne–Liège 262 km (162.8 mi)

	Rider	Team	Time
1	Michele Bartoli (ITA)	MG Maglificio–Technogym	7h 09' 45"
2	Laurent Jalabert (FRA)	ONCE	+ 8"
3	Gabriele Colombo (ITA)	Batik–Del Monte	+ 21"
4	Luc Leblanc (FRA)	Team Polti	+ 22"
5	Max Sciandri (GBR)	Française des Jeux	+ 27"
6	Johan Museeuw (BEL)	Mapei–GB	s.t.
7	Beat Zberg (SUI)	Mercatone Uno	s.t.
8	Marco Pantani (ITA)	Mercatone Uno	s.t.
9	Laurent Madouas (FRA)	Lotto–Mobistar–Isoglass	s.t.
10	Mauro Gianetti (SUI)	Française des Jeux	s.t.

General classification after Liège–Bastogne–Liège

	Rider	Team	Points
1	Michele Bartoli (ITA)	MG Maglificio–Technogym	164
2	Rolf Sørensen (DEN)	Rabobank	164
3	Frédéric Guesdon (FRA)	Française des Jeux	100
4	Erik Zabel (GER)	Team Telekom	100
5	Johan Museeuw (BEL)	Mapei–GB	95
6	Jo Planckaert (BEL)	Lotto–Mobistar–Isoglass	94
7	Frédéric Moncassin (FRA)	GAN	94
8	Davide Casarotto (ITA)	Scrigno–Gaerne	87
9	Andrei Tchmil (UKR)	Lotto–Mobistar–Isoglass	80
10	Laurent Jalabert (FRA)	ONCE	79

26 April 1997 — Amstel Gold Race 258 km (160.3 mi)

	Rider	Team	Time
1	Bjarne Riis (DEN)	Team Telekom	6h 11' 19"
2	Andrea Tafi (ITA)	Mapei–GB	+ 46"
3	Beat Zberg (SUI)	Mercatone Uno	s.t.
4	Laurent Roux (FRA)	TVM–Farm Frites	s.t.
5	Mauro Gianetti (SUI)	Française des Jeux	s.t.
6	Michele Bartoli (ITA)	MG Maglificio–Technogym	+ 47"
7	Laurent Jalabert (FRA)	ONCE	+ 48"
8	Andrei Tchmil (UKR)	Lotto–Mobistar–Isoglass	+ 1' 08"
9	Rolf Aldag (GER)	Team Telekom	s.t.
10	Rolf Sørensen (DEN)	Rabobank	s.t.

General classification after Amstel Gold Race

	Rider	Team	Points
1	Michele Bartoli (ITA)	MG Maglificio–Technogym	196
2	Rolf Sørensen (DEN)	Rabobank	180
3	Laurent Jalabert (FRA)	ONCE	107
4	Andrei Tchmil (UKR)	Lotto–Mobistar–Isoglass	104
5	Bjarne Riis (DEN)	Team Telekom	100
6	Frédéric Guesdon (FRA)	Française des Jeux	100
7	Erik Zabel (GER)	Team Telekom	100
8	Davide Casarotto (ITA)	Scrigno–Gaerne	98
9	Johan Museeuw (BEL)	Mapei–GB	95
10	Jo Planckaert (BEL)	Lotto–Mobistar–Isoglass	94
10	Frédéric Moncassin (FRA)	GAN	94

9 August 1997 — Clásica de San Sebastián 234 km (145.4 mi)

	Rider	Team	Time
1	Davide Rebellin (ITA)	Française des Jeux	5h 47' 22"
2	Alexander Gontchenkov (UKR)	Roslotto–ZG Mobili	s.t.
3	Stefano Colagè (ITA)	Refin–Mobilvetta	s.t.
4	Maurizio Fondriest (ITA)	Cofidis	s.t.
5	Gianluca Bortolami (ITA)	Festina–Lotus	s.t.
6	Rolf Sørensen (DEN)	Rabobank	s.t.
7	Beat Zberg (SUI)	Mercatone Uno	s.t.
8	Jens Heppner (GER)	Team Telekom	s.t.
9	Richard Virenque (FRA)	Festina–Lotus	s.t.
10	Giuseppe Tartaggia (ITA)	Batik–Del Monte	s.t.

General classification after Clásica de San Sebastián

	Rider	Team	Points
1	Rolf Sørensen (DEN)	Rabobank	212
2	Michele Bartoli (ITA)	MG Maglificio–Technogym	196
3	Beat Zberg (SUI)	Mercatone Uno	120
4	Laurent Jalabert (FRA)	ONCE	114
5	Andrei Tchmil (UKR)	Lotto–Mobistar–Isoglass	104
6	Davide Rebellin (ITA)	Française des Jeux	101
7	Bjarne Riis (DEN)	Team Telekom	100
8	Frédéric Guesdon (FRA)	Française des Jeux	100
9	Erik Zabel (GER)	Team Telekom	100
10	Davide Casarotto (ITA)	Scrigno–Gaerne	98

17 August 1997 — Rochester International Classic 242 km (150.4 mi)

	Rider	Team	Time
1	Andrea Tafi (ITA)	Mapei–GB	6h 07' 42"
2	Andrea Ferrigato (ITA)	Roslotto–ZG Mobili	+ 43"
3	Gianluca Bortolami (ITA)	Festina–Lotus	s.t.
4	Stéphane Heulot (FRA)	Française des Jeux	s.t.
5	Andrea Vatteroni (ITA)	Scrigno–Gaerne	s.t.
6	Max Sciandri (GBR)	Française des Jeux	+ 49"
7	Roberto Petito (ITA)	Saeco–Estro	+ 55"
8	Daniele Nardello (ITA)	Mapei–GB	s.t.
9	Alexander Gontchenkov (UKR)	Roslotto–ZG Mobili	s.t.
10	Alberto Elli (ITA)	Casino	s.t.

General classification after Rochester International Classic

	Rider	Team	Points
1	Rolf Sørensen (DEN)	Rabobank	225
2	Michele Bartoli (ITA)	MG Maglificio–Technogym	196
3	Andrea Tafi (ITA)	Mapei–GB	190
4	Beat Zberg (SUI)	Mercatone Uno	120
5	Laurent Jalabert (FRA)	ONCE	114
6	Max Sciandri (GBR)	Française des Jeux	113
7	Andrei Tchmil (UKR)	Lotto–Mobistar–Isoglass	112
8	Jo Planckaert (BEL)	Lotto–Mobistar–Isoglass	106
9	Davide Rebellin (ITA)	Française des Jeux	105
10	Bjarne Riis (DEN)	Team Telekom	100
10	Frédéric Guesdon (FRA)	Française des Jeux	100
10	Erik Zabel (GER)	Team Telekom	100

24 August 1997 — Grand Prix de Suisse 237 km (147.3 mi)

	Rider	Team	Time
1	Davide Rebellin (ITA)	Française des Jeux	6h 18' 55"
2	Jan Ullrich (GER)	Team Telekom	s.t.
3	Rolf Sørensen (DEN)	Rabobank	s.t.
4	Stéphane Heulot (FRA)	Française des Jeux	s.t.
5	Richard Virenque (FRA)	Festina–Lotus	s.t.
6	Michele Bartoli (ITA)	MG Maglificio–Technogym	s.t.
7	Maarten den Bakker (NED)	TVM–Farm Frites	s.t.
8	Alberto Elli (ITA)	Casino	s.t.
9	Yvon Ledanois (FRA)	GAN	s.t.
10	Alexander Gontchenkov (UKR)	Roslotto–ZG Mobili	s.t.

General classification after Grand Prix de Suisse

	Rider	Team	Points
1	Rolf Sørensen (DEN)	Rabobank	275
2	Michele Bartoli (ITA)	MG Maglificio–Technogym	228
3	Davide Rebellin (ITA)	Française des Jeux	205
4	Andrea Tafi (ITA)	Mapei–GB	202
5	Beat Zberg (SUI)	Mercatone Uno	135
6	Alberto Elli (ITA)	Casino	120
7	Laurent Jalabert (FRA)	ONCE	114
8	Max Sciandri (GBR)	Française des Jeux	113
9	Andrei Tchmil (UKR)	Lotto–Mobistar–Isoglass	112
10	Jo Planckaert (BEL)	Lotto–Mobistar–Isoglass	106

5 October 1997 — Paris–Tours 256 km (159.1 mi)

	Rider	Team	Time
1	Andrei Tchmil (UKR)	Lotto–Mobistar–Isoglass	5h 23' 44"
2	Max Sciandri (GBR)	Française des Jeux	+ 1"
3	Henk Vogels (AUS)	GAN	+ 3"
4	Claudio Camin (ITA)	Brescialat–Oyster	s.t.
5	Ján Svorada (CZE)	Mapei–GB	s.t.
6	Mirko Rossato (ITA)	Scrigno–Gaerne	s.t.
7	Biagio Conte (ITA)	Scrigno–Gaerne	s.t.
8	Aart Vierhouten (NED)	Rabobank	s.t.
9	Léon van Bon (NED)	Rabobank	s.t.
10	Luca Gelfi (ITA)	Brescialat–Oyster	s.t.

General classification after Paris–Tours

	Rider	Team	Points
1	Rolf Sørensen (DEN)	Rabobank	275
2	Michele Bartoli (ITA)	MG Maglificio–Technogym	240
3	Davide Rebellin (ITA)	Française des Jeux	214
4	Andrea Tafi (ITA)	Mapei–GB	212
5	Andrei Tchmil (UKR)	Lotto–Mobistar–Isoglass	212
6	Max Sciandri (GBR)	Française des Jeux	183
7	Beat Zberg (SUI)	Mercatone Uno	135
8	Alberto Elli (ITA)	Casino	120
9	Laurent Jalabert (FRA)	ONCE	114
10	Davide Casarotto (ITA)	Scrigno–Gaerne	112

18 October 1997 — Giro di Lombardia 250 km (155.3 mi)

	Rider	Team	Time
1	Laurent Jalabert (FRA)	ONCE	5h 48' 44"
2	Paolo Lanfranchi (ITA)	Mapei–GB	s.t.
3	Francesco Casagrande (ITA)	Saeco–Estro	s.t.
4	Michele Bartoli (ITA)	MG Maglificio–Technogym	+ 3"
5	Paolo Valoti (ITA)	Cantina Tollo–Carrier–Starplast	+ 1' 07"
6	Axel Merckx (BEL)	Team Polti	+ 1' 30"
7	Andrea Tafi (ITA)	Mapei–GB	+ 1' 31"
8	Davide Rebellin (ITA)	Française des Jeux	+ 1' 32"
9	Wladimir Belli (ITA)	Brescialat–Oyster	+ 2' 21"
10	Alessandro Bertolini (ITA)	MG Maglificio–Technogym	s.t.

General classification after Giro di Lombardia

	Rider	Team	Points
1	Michele Bartoli (ITA)	MG Maglificio–Technogym	280
2	Rolf Sørensen (DEN)	Rabobank	275
3	Andrea Tafi (ITA)	Mapei–GB	240
4	Davide Rebellin (ITA)	Française des Jeux	238
5	Laurent Jalabert (FRA)	ONCE	214
6	Andrei Tchmil (UKR)	Lotto–Mobistar–Isoglass	212
7	Max Sciandri (GBR)	Française des Jeux	192
8	Beat Zberg (SUI)	Mercatone Uno	140
9	Alberto Elli (ITA)	Casino	120
10	Davide Casarotto (ITA)	Scrigno–Gaerne	112

== Final standings ==
=== Individual ===
Points are awarded to the top 25 classified riders. Riders must start at least 6 races to be classified.

The points are awarded for every race using the following system:

Position	1st	2nd	3rd	4th	5th	6th	7th	8th	9th	10th	11th	12th	13th	14th	15th	16th	17th	18th	19th	20th	21st	22nd	23rd	24th	25th
Points	100	70	50	40	36	32	28	24	20	16	15	14	13	12	11	10	9	8	7	6	5	4	3	2	1

Pos.	Rider	Team	MSR	ToF	ROU	LBL	AGR	CSS	ROC	SUI	TOU	LOM	Pts.
1	Michele Bartoli (ITA)	MG Maglificio–Technogym	36	28	DNS	100	32	0	0	32	12	40	280
2	Rolf Sørensen (DEN)	Rabobank	24	100	32	8	16	32	13	50	DNS	DNS	275
3	Andrea Tafi (ITA)	Mapei–GB	0	0	7	0	70	13	100	12	10	28	240
4	Davide Rebellin (ITA)	Française des Jeux	DNS	DNS	DNS	1	0	100	4	100	9	24	238
5	Laurent Jalabert (FRA)	ONCE	9	0	DNS	70	28	7	DNS	0	0	100	214
6	Andrei Tchmil (UKR)	Lotto–Mobistar–Isoglass	0	40	40	DNS	24	0	8	0	100	0	212
7	Max Sciandri (GBR)	Française des Jeux	11	15	0	36	7	12	32	0	70	9	192
8	Beat Zberg (SUI)	Mercatone Uno	14	DNS	0	28	50	28	DNS	15	DNS	5	140
9	Alberto Elli (ITA)	Casino	70	DNS	DNS	0	0	10	16	24	0	DNS	120
10	Davide Casarotto (ITA)	Scrigno–Gaerne	15	36	36	0	11	DNS	0	0	14	0	112
11	Jo Planckaert (BEL)	Lotto–Mobistar–Isoglass	0	24	70	DNS	DNS	DNS	12	0	0	DNS	106
12	Alexander Gontchenkov (UKR)	Roslotto–ZG Mobili	DNS	0	DNS	0	0	70	20	16	DNS	0	106
13	Henk Vogels (AUS)	GAN	0	11	16	DNS	15	DNS	9	DNS	50	DNS	101
14	Johan Museeuw (BEL)	Mapei–GB	0	13	50	32	0	0	0	DNS	DNS	DNS	95
15	Biagio Conte (ITA)	Scrigno–Gaerne	50	0	0	0	0	DNS	14	DNS	28	0	92
16	Andrea Ferrigato (ITA)	Roslotto–ZG Mobili	20	0	DNS	0	0	0	70	0	0	DNS	90
17	Richard Virenque (FRA)	Festina–Lotus	0	DNS	DNS	12	0	20	DNS	36	0	0	68
18	Laurent Roux (FRA)	TVM–Farm Frites	0	DNS	DNS	7	40	0	DNS	8	0	12	67
19	Mauro Gianetti (SUI)	Française des Jeux	7	DNS	DNS	16	36	0	0	6	0	0	65
20	Franco Ballerini (ITA)	Mapei–GB	0	50	2	0	0	DNS	DNS	0	0	7	59
Race winners not eligible for general classification
Pos.	Rider	Team	MSR	ToF	ROU	LBL	AGR	CSS	ROC	SUI	TOU	LOM	Pts.
-	Frédéric Guesdon (FRA)	Française des Jeux	0	0	100	DNS	DNS	0	DNS	DNS	4	DNS	104
-	Bjarne Riis (DEN)	Team Telekom	0	DNS	DNS	0	100	DNS	DNS	DNS	0	DNS	100
-	Erik Zabel (GER)	Team Telekom	100	0	0	DNS	0	DNS	DNS	DNS	DNS	DNS	100

Key
Colour	Result
Gold	Winner
Silver	2nd place
Bronze	3rd place
Green	Top ten position
Blue	Other points position
Purple	Out of points, retired
Red	Did not start (DNS)

=== Teams ===
Points are awarded to the top 10 teams. Teams must start at least 8 races to be classified. The first 18 teams in world ranking must start in all races.

The points are awarded for every race using the following system:

Position	1st	2nd	3rd	4th	5th	6th	7th	8th	9th	10th
Points	12	9	8	7	6	5	4	3	2	1

Pos.	Teams	MSR	ToF	ROU	LBL	AGR	CSS	ROC	SUI	TOU	LOM	Pts.
1	Française des Jeux	8	0	7	9	6	12	12	12	9	7	82
2	Mapei–GB	0	9	9	3	8	2	9	0	5	12	57
3	TVM–Farm Frites	9	6	4	0	12	0	4	6	7	0	48
4	Rabobank	0	7	6	1	4	8	1	7	8	2	44
5	Festina–Lotus	0	0	0	7	1	9	7	9	1	8	42
