= 1997 Liège–Bastogne–Liège =

1997 UCI Road World Cup, race 4
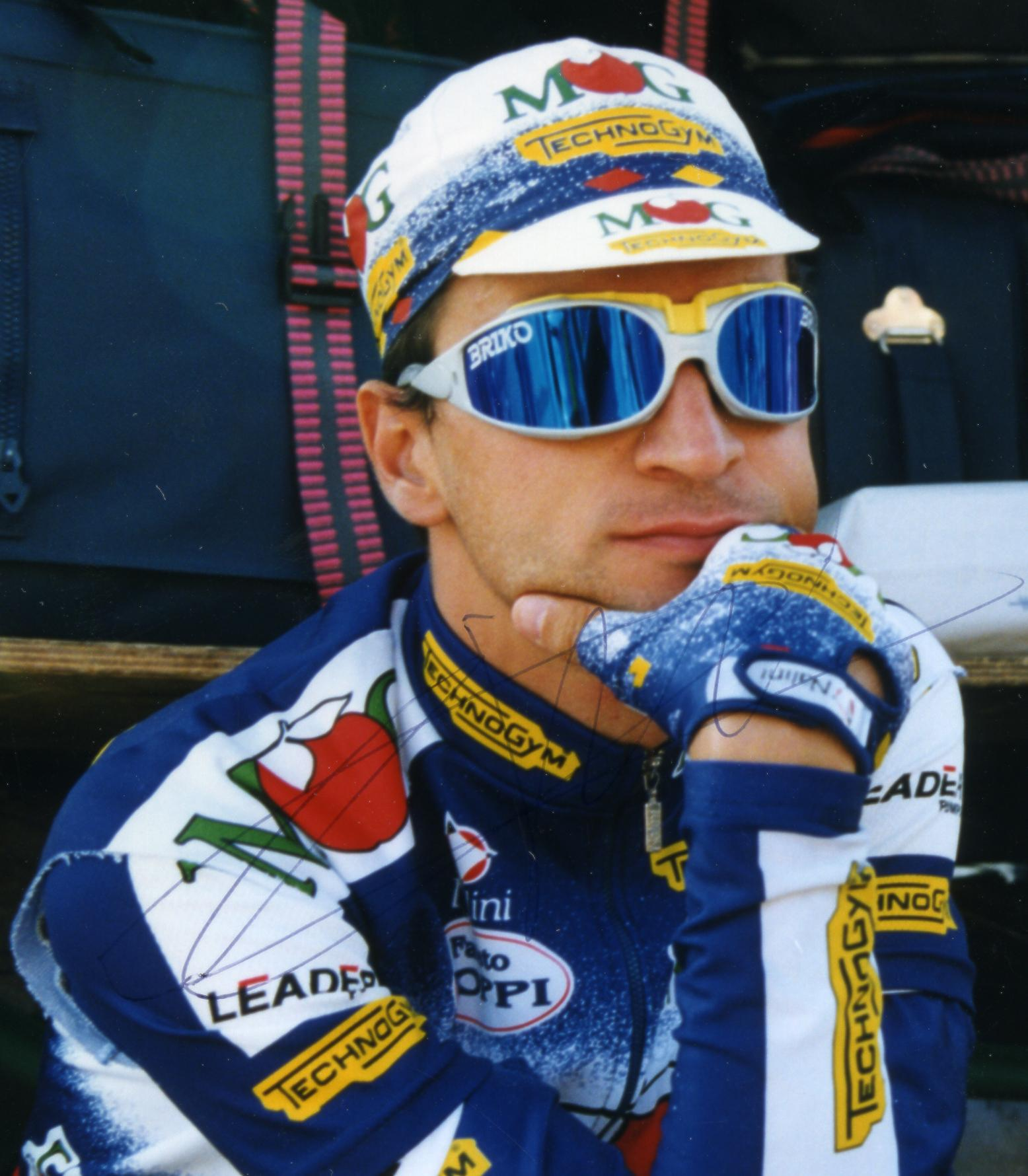
- Michele Bartoli won the 83rd running of Liège–Bastogne–Liège (pictured at the 1997 Paris–Tours)

Race details
- Dates: 20 April 1997
- Distance: 262 km (163 mi)
- Winning time: 7h 09' 45"

Results
	Winner	Michele Bartoli (ITA)	(MG Maglificio–Technogym)
	Second	Laurent Jalabert (FRA)	(ONCE)
	Third	Gabriele Colombo (ITA)	(Batik–Del Monte)

The 83rd running of the Liège–Bastogne–Liège cycling classic was held on 20 April 1997. It was the fourth leg of the 1997 UCI Road World Cup, coming between Paris–Roubaix and the Amstel Gold Race. Italian Michele Bartoli won the race after distancing his breakaway companion, Frenchman Laurent Jalabert, at one kilometre from the finish in Ans. Gabriele Colombo completed the podium. 112 of 188 riders finished the race.

== Route ==
The 83rd edition of the "Doyenne Race" started on the Place Saint-Lambert in the centre of Liège, before heading south towards Bastogne and returning north to finish in the suburban community of Ans. The total distance was 262 km (163 mi).

The course contained 13 categorized climbs in the Ardennes:

	Climb	Km
1	Côte de Saint-Roch	81
2	Côte de Mormont	118
3	Côte de Wanne	154
4	Côte des Hézalles	163
5	Côte d'Aisomont	171
6	Côte de Stockeu	178
7	Côte de la Haute-Levée	183,5

	Climb	Km
8	Côte du Rosier	195,5
9	Côte de la Vecquée	208
10	Côte de La Redoute	225
11	Côte de Sprimont	230,5
12	Côte des Forges	235
13	Côte du Sart-Tilman	247

== Race Summary ==
The race started in cold and sunny weather and was animated by a solo breakaway from Austrian Georg Totschnig who broke clear after 6 km (3.7 mi) and had a maximum lead of 20 minutes on the peloton. The peloton was led by the ONCE team of Laurent Jalabert, who had won La Flèche Wallonne four days earlier. Totschnig was later joined by Italian Ermanno Brignoli, but their lead had shrunk to five minutes on the Stockeu climb.

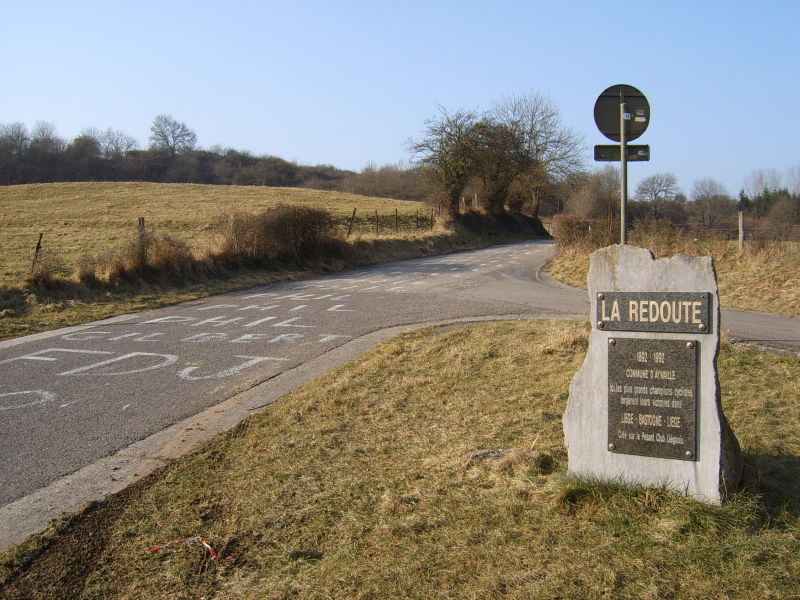
The decisive break was made on the Côte de La Redoute at 40 km from the finish by Michele Bartoli, Laurent Jalabert and Alex Zülle.

By the Côte de La Redoute, 40 km (25 mi) from the finish, Totschnig and Brignoli were caught by the peloton. Swiss Alex Zülle of the ONCE team attacked on the lower slopes of the climb, forcing the decisive breakaway. By the top of La Redoute, four men were in the leading break: teammates Zülle and Jalabert, and Italians Michele Bartoli and Marco Pantani. Climbing specialist Pantani was quickly dropped on the flat stretches and Johan Museeuw, the ruling world champion, tried to bridge the gap to the leaders but missed out by 50 metres.

With 25 km (16 mi) remaining, the three leaders had a 1' 10" lead on the chase group, which was led by Rabobank for World Cup leader Rolf Sørensen, and Mapei–GB for Museeuw. Alex Zülle and Laurent Jalabert, trying to distance Michele Bartoli, attacked one after the other on the Côte de Sart Tilman, but were unable to drop the Italian. Zülle, who did most of the work in the lead group, was dropped after an acceleration of Bartoli in the final kilometres. As the two leaders approached the finish, Michele Bartoli launched an ultimate attack in the final uphill kilometre, dropping Jalabert and claiming his first win in the Ardennes classic. Jalabert was second at eight seconds.

Gabriele Colombo and Luc Leblanc, who had broken away from the chase group, finished third and fourth. Max Sciandri won the sprint for fifth place before Johan Museeuw.

== Result ==
Result (top 10)
Rank	Rider	Team	Time
1	Michele Bartoli (ITA)	MG Maglificio–Technogym	7h 09' 45"
2	Laurent Jalabert (FRA)	ONCE	+ 08"
3	Gabriele Colombo (ITA)	Batik–Del Monte	+ 21"
4	Luc Leblanc (FRA)	Team Polti	+ 22"
5	Maximilian Sciandri (GBR)	Française des Jeux	+ 27"
6	Johan Museeuw (BEL)	Mapei–GB	s.t.
7	Beat Zberg (SUI)	Mercatone Uno	s.t.
8	Marco Pantani (ITA)	Mercatone Uno	s.t.
9	Laurent Madouas (FRA)	Lotto–Mobistar–Isoglass	s.t.
10	Mauro Gianetti (SUI)	Française des Jeux	s.t.
