= 1997 Rochester International Classic =

Road cycling race

1997 UCI Road World Cup

Race details
- Dates: 17 August 1997
- Stages: 1
- Distance: 242 km (150.4 mi)
- Winning time: 6h 07' 42"

Results
| | Winner | Andrea Tafi (ITA) | (Mapei–GB) |
| | Second | Andrea Ferrigato (ITA) | (Roslotto–ZG Mobili) |
| | Third | Gianluca Bortolami (ITA) | (Festina–Lotus) |

The 1997 Rochester International Classic was the 9th and final edition of the Rochester International Classic cycle race (also known as Wincanton Classic and Leeds International Classic) and was held on 17 August. The race took place in and around Rochester. The race was won by Andrea Tafi of the Mapei–GB team.

== Results ==
| | Cyclist | Team | Time |
|---|---|---|---|
| 1 | Andrea Tafi (ITA) | Mapei–GB | 6h 07' 42" |
| 2 | Andrea Ferrigato (ITA) | Roslotto–ZG Mobili | + 43" |
| 3 | Gianluca Bortolami (ITA) | Festina–Lotus | s.t. |
| 4 | Stéphane Heulot (FRA) | Française des Jeux | s.t. |
| 5 | Andrea Vatteroni (ITA) | Scrigno–Gaerne | s.t. |
| 6 | Max Sciandri (GBR) | Française des Jeux | + 49" |
| 7 | Roberto Petito (ITA) | Saeco–Estro | + 55" |
| 8 | Daniele Nardello (ITA) | Mapei–GB | s.t. |
| 9 | Alexander Gontchenkov (UKR) | Roslotto–ZG Mobili | s.t. |
| 10 | Alberto Elli (ITA) | Casino | s.t. |
