= 1998 Paris–Roubaix =

Race details
- Dates: April 12, 1998
- Stages: 1
- Distance: 266.5 km (165.6 mi)
- Winning time: 6h 55' 16"

Results
| | Winner | Franco Ballerini (ITA) | (Mapei–Bricobi) |
| | Second | Andrea Tafi (ITA) | (Mapei–Bricobi) |
| | Third | Wilfried Peeters (BEL) | (Mapei–Bricobi) |

The 1998 Paris–Roubaix was the 96th running of the Paris–Roubaix single-day cycling race, often known as the Hell of the North. It was held on 12 April 1998 over a distance of 266.5 kilometres (165.6 miles). Franco Ballerini won the monument classic; his Mapei–Bricobi team took all three podium positions.

Johan Museeuw, the winner of 1996, crashed heavily in the Trouée d'Arenberg pavé section, shattering his knee. On top of this came a dangerous gangrene infection which nearly spelled the end of his career.

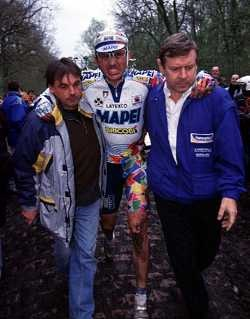
Johan Museeuw minutes after his fall in the Forest of Wallers-Arenberg

== Results ==
12-04-1998: Compiègne–Roubaix, 266.5 km.

Results (1–10)
| | Cyclist | Team | Time |
|---|---|---|---|
| 1 | Franco Ballerini (ITA) | Mapei–Bricobi | 6h 57' 49" |
| 2 | Andrea Tafi (ITA) | Mapei–Bricobi | + 4' 16" |
| 3 | Wilfried Peeters (BEL) | Mapei–Bricobi | + 4' 19" |
| 4 | Léon van Bon (NED) | Rabobank | + 4' 49" |
| 5 | Frédéric Moncassin (FRA) | GAN | + 4' 49" |
| 6 | Rolf Sørensen (DEN) | Rabobank | + 4' 50" |
| 7 | Magnus Bäckstedt (SWE) | GAN | + 4' 52" |
| 8 | Bart Leysen (BEL) | Mapei–Bricobi | + 6' 34" |
| 9 | Gianluca Bortolami (ITA) | Festina–Lotus | + 6' 34" |
| 10 | Henk Vogels (AUS) | GAN | + 6' 34" |
