= 2002 GP Ouest-France =

Race details
- Dates: 25 August 2002
- Stages: 1
- Distance: 196 km (121.8 mi)
- Winning time: 4h 44' 02"

Results
	Winner	Jeremy Hunt (GBR)	(BigMat–Auber 93)
	Second	Stuart O'Grady (AUS)	(Crédit Agricole)
	Third	Baden Cooke (AUS)	(Française des Jeux)

The 2002 GP Ouest-France was the 66th edition of the GP Ouest-France cycle race and was held on 25 August 2002. The race started and finished in Plouay. The race was won by Jeremy Hunt of the BigMat–Auber 93 team.

== General classification ==
Final general classification

Rank	Rider	Team	Time
1	Jeremy Hunt (GBR)	BigMat–Auber 93	4h 44' 02"
2	Stuart O'Grady (AUS)	Crédit Agricole	+ 0"
3	Baden Cooke (AUS)	Française des Jeux	+ 0"
4	Martin Elmiger (SUI)	Phonak	+ 0"
5	Fred Rodriguez (USA)	Domo–Farm Frites	+ 0"
6	Jo Planckaert (BEL)	Cofidis	+ 0"
7	Peter Van Petegem (BEL)	Lotto–Adecco	+ 0"
8	Serge Baguet (BEL)	Lotto–Adecco	+ 0"
9	Laurent Jalabert (FRA)	CSC–Tiscali	+ 0"
10	Andrea Tafi (ITA)	Mapei–Quick-Step	+ 0"
