= 1998 GP Ouest-France =

Race details
- Dates: 30 August 1998
- Stages: 1
- Distance: 209 km (129.9 mi)
- Winning time: 4h 57' 13"

Results
	Winner	Pascal Hervé (FRA)	(Festina–Lotus)
	Second	Ludo Dierckxsens (BEL)	(Lotto–Mobistar)
	Third	Stéphane Heulot (FRA)	(Française des Jeux)

The 1998 GP Ouest-France was the 62nd edition of the GP Ouest-France cycle race and was held on 30 August 1998. The race started and finished in Plouay. The race was won by Pascal Hervé of the Festina team.

== General classification ==
Final general classification

Rank	Rider	Team	Time
1	Pascal Hervé (FRA)	Festina–Lotus	4h 57' 13"
2	Ludo Dierckxsens (BEL)	Lotto–Mobistar	+ 1' 19"
3	Stéphane Heulot (FRA)	Française des Jeux	+ 3' 30"
4	Grzegorz Gwiazdowski (POL)	Cofidis	+ 3' 38"
5	Francesco Secchiari (ITA)	Scrigno–Gaerne	+ 3' 50"
6	Christophe Rinero (FRA)	Cofidis	+ 3' 52"
7	Laurent Madouas (FRA)	Lotto–Mobistar	+ 3' 54"
8	Andrea Ferrigato (ITA)	Vitalicio Seguros	+ 4' 00"
9	Paolo Valoti (ITA)	Cantina Tollo–Alexia Alluminio	+ 4' 05"
10	Oscar Pozzi (ITA)	Asics–CGA	+ 5' 02"
