= 1996 Critérium du Dauphiné Libéré =

Race details
- Dates: 2–9 June 1996
- Stages: 7 + Prologue
- Distance: 1,202.8 km (747.4 mi)
- Winning time: 30h 57' 49"

Results
Jersey awarded to the overall winner	Winner	Miguel Induráin (ESP)	(Banesto)
	Second	Tony Rominger (SUI)	(Mapei–GB)
	Third	Richard Virenque (FRA)	(Festina–Lotus)
Jersey awarded to the mountains classification winner	Mountains	Richard Virenque (FRA)	(Festina–Lotus)

The 1996 Critérium du Dauphiné Libéré was the 48th edition of the cycle race and was held from 2 June to 9 June 1996. The race started in Megève and finished in Grenoble. The race was won by Miguel Induráin of the Banesto team.

== Teams ==
Sixteen teams, containing a total of 127 riders, participated in the race:

- Banesto
- GAN
- Festina–Lotus
- Mapei–GB
- ONCE
- Motorola
- Team Telekom
- Team Polti
- Lotto
- Kelme–Artiach
- MX Onda
- Agrigel–La Creuse–Fenioux
- Collstrop–Eddy Merckx
- Petit Casino
- Aubervilliers 93
- Mutuelle de Seine-et-Marne

== Route ==
Stage characteristics and winners
Stage	Date	Course	Distance	Type	Stage winner
P	2 June 1996	Megève	5.7 km (3.5 mi)	Individual time trial	Chris Boardman (GBR)
1	3 June 1996	Megève to Villefontaine	227 km (141 mi)	Flat stage	Artūras Kasputis (LTU)
2	4 June 1996	Charbonnières-les-Bains to Firminy	195 km (121 mi)	Flat stage	François Simon (FRA)
3	5 June 1996	Saint-Maurice-de-Lignon to Tournon-sur-Rhône	175 km (109 mi)	Flat stage	Gilles Bouvard (FRA)
4	6 June 1996	Tain-l'Hermitage to Mont Ventoux	173 km (107 mi)	High mountain stage	Richard Virenque (FRA)
5	7 June 1996	Gigondas to Beaumes-de-Venise	42.1 km (26.2 mi)	Individual time trial	Miguel Induráin (ESP)
6	8 June 1996	Digne-les-Bains to Briançon	211 km (131 mi)	Medium mountain stage	Miguel Induráin (ESP)
7	9 June 1996	Briançon to Grenoble	174 km (108 mi)	High mountain stage	Luc Leblanc (FRA)

== Stages ==
=== Prologue ===
2 June 1996 – Megève, 5.7 km (3.5 mi) (ITT)

Prologue result and general classification after Prologue

Rank	Rider	Team	Time
1	Chris Boardman (GBR)	GAN	7' 55"
2	Laurent Brochard (FRA)	Festina–Lotus	+ 11"
3	Tony Rominger (SUI)	Mapei–GB	+ 13"

=== Stage 1 ===
3 June 1996 – Megève to Villefontaine, 227 km (141.1 mi)

Stage 1 result

Rank	Rider	Team	Time
1	Artūras Kasputis (LTU)	Petit Casino	5h 31' 15"
2	Frédéric Moncassin (FRA)	GAN	+ 4' 12"
3	Jean-Claude Colotti (FRA)	Agrigel–La Creuse–Fenioux	s.t.

General classification after Stage 1

Rank	Rider	Team	Time
1	Artūras Kasputis (LTU)	Petit Casino	5h 39' 42"
2	Chris Boardman (GBR)	GAN	+ 3' 40"
3	Laurent Brochard (FRA)	Festina–Lotus	+ 3' 51"

=== Stage 2 ===
4 June 1996 – Charbonnières-les-Bains to Firminy, 195 km (121.2 mi)

Stage 2 result

Rank	Rider	Team	Time
1	François Simon (FRA)	GAN	4h 42' 58"
2	Kaspars Ozers (LAT)	Motorola	s.t.
3	Miguel Induráin (ESP)	Banesto	s.t.

General classification after Stage 2

Rank	Rider	Team	Time
1	Artūras Kasputis (LTU)	Petit Casino	10h 22' 50"
2	Chris Boardman (GBR)	GAN	+ 3' 40"
3	Laurent Brochard (FRA)	Festina–Lotus	+ 3' 41"

=== Stage 3 ===
5 June 1996 – Saint-Maurice-de-Lignon to Tournon-sur-Rhône, 175 km (108.7 mi)

Stage 3 result

Rank	Rider	Team	Time
1	Gilles Bouvard (FRA)	Collstrop–Eddy Merckx	4h 11' 26"
2	Christian Henn (GER)	Team Telekom	s.t.
3	Mariano Rojas (ESP)	ONCE	s.t.

General classification after Stage 3

Rank	Rider	Team	Time
1	Artūras Kasputis (LTU)	Petit Casino	14h 34' 48"
2	Gilles Bouvard (FRA)	Collstrop–Eddy Merckx	+ 3' 22"
3	Chris Boardman (GBR)	GAN	+ 3' 30"

=== Stage 4 ===
6 June 1996 – Tain-l'Hermitage to Mont Ventoux, 173 km (107.5 mi)

Stage 4 result

Rank	Rider	Team	Time
1	Richard Virenque (FRA)	Festina–Lotus	5h 00' 39"
2	Laurent Jalabert (FRA)	ONCE	s.t.
3	Laurent Brochard (FRA)	Festina–Lotus	+ 1' 01"

General classification after Stage 4

Rank	Rider	Team	Time
1	Laurent Jalabert (FRA)	ONCE	19h 39' 22"
2	Richard Virenque (FRA)	Festina–Lotus	+ 10"
3	Laurent Brochard (FRA)	Festina–Lotus	+ 47"

=== Stage 5 ===
7 June 1996 – Gigondas to Beaumes-de-Venise, 42.1 km (26.2 mi) (ITT)

Stage 5 result

Rank	Rider	Team	Time
1	Miguel Induráin (ESP)	Banesto	49' 31"
2	Tony Rominger (SUI)	Mapei–GB	+ 28"
3	Chris Boardman (GBR)	GAN	+ 40"

General classification after Stage 5

Rank	Rider	Team	Time
1	Laurent Jalabert (FRA)	ONCE	20h 29' 43"
2	Miguel Induráin (ESP)	Banesto	+ 3"
3	Tony Rominger (SUI)	Mapei–GB	+ 1' 42"

=== Stage 6 ===
8 May 1996 – Digne-les-Bains to Briançon, 211 km (131.1 mi)

Stage 6 result

Rank	Rider	Team	Time
1	Miguel Induráin (ESP)	Banesto	5h 59' 37"
2	Laurent Madouas (FRA)	Motorola	s.t.
3	Richard Virenque (FRA)	Festina–Lotus	+ 5"

General classification after Stage 6

Rank	Rider	Team	Time
1	Miguel Induráin (ESP)	Banesto	26h 29' 23"
2	Laurent Jalabert (FRA)	ONCE	+ 1' 44"
3	Tony Rominger (SUI)	Mapei–GB	+ 1' 53"

=== Stage 7 ===
9 June 1996 – Briançon to Grenoble, 174 km (108.1 mi)

Stage 7 result

Rank	Rider	Team	Time
1	Luc Leblanc (FRA)	Team Polti	4h 27' 54"
2	Tony Rominger (SUI)	Mapei–GB	s.t.
3	Fernando Escartín (ESP)	Kelme–Artiach	s.t.

General classification after Stage 7

Rank	Rider	Team	Time
1	Miguel Induráin (ESP)	Banesto	30h 57' 49"
2	Tony Rominger (SUI)	Mapei–GB	+ 1' 21"
3	Richard Virenque (FRA)	Festina–Lotus	+ 1' 32"

== General classification ==
Final general classification

Rank	Rider	Team	Time
1	Miguel Induráin (ESP)	Banesto	30h 57' 49"
2	Tony Rominger (SUI)	Mapei–GB	+ 1' 21"
3	Richard Virenque (FRA)	Festina–Lotus	+ 1' 32"
4	Stéphane Heulot (FRA)	GAN	+ 4' 49"
5	Chris Boardman (GBR)	GAN	+ 5' 49"
6	Fernando Escartín (ESP)	Kelme–Artiach	+ 6' 48"
7	Laurent Brochard (FRA)	Festina–Lotus	+ 7' 23"
8	Laurent Madouas (FRA)	Motorola	+ 8' 24"
9	Udo Bölts (GER)	Team Telekom	+ 10' 19"
10	Laurent Dufaux (SUI)	Festina–Lotus	+ 11' 37"
