= 1997 Grand Prix de Suisse =

1997 UCI Road World Cup

Race details
- Dates: 24 August 1997
- Stages: 1
- Distance: 237 km (147.3 mi)
- Winning time: 6h 18' 55"

Results
	Winner	Davide Rebellin (ITA)	(Française des Jeux)
	Second	Jan Ullrich (GER)	(Team Telekom)
	Third	Rolf Sørensen (DEN)	(Rabobank)

The 1997 Grand Prix de Suisse was the 82nd edition of the Züri-Metzgete road cycling one day race. It was held on 24 August 1997 as part of the 1997 UCI Road World Cup. The race took place between the cities of Basel and Zürich was won by Davide Rebellin of Italy.

== Result ==
Rank	Rider	Team	Time
1	Davide Rebellin (ITA)	Française des Jeux	6h 18' 55"
2	Jan Ullrich (GER)	Team Telekom	s.t.
3	Rolf Sørensen (DEN)	Rabobank	s.t.
4	Stéphane Heulot (FRA)	Française des Jeux	s.t.
5	Richard Virenque (FRA)	Festina–Lotus	s.t.
6	Michele Bartoli (ITA)	MG Maglificio–Technogym	s.t.
7	Maarten den Bakker (NED)	TVM–Farm Frites	s.t.
8	Alberto Elli (ITA)	Casino	s.t.
9	Yvon Ledanois (FRA)	GAN	s.t.
10	Alexander Gontchenkov (UKR)	Roslotto–ZG Mobili	s.t.
