= 1999 Paris–Roubaix =

Race details
- Dates: April 11, 1999
- Stages: 1
- Distance: 273 km (169.6 mi)
- Winning time: 6h 44' 15"

Results
	Winner	Andrea Tafi (ITA)	(Mapei–Quick-Step)
	Second	Wilfried Peeters (BEL)	(Mapei–Quick-Step)
	Third	Tom Steels (BEL)	(Mapei–Quick-Step)

The 1999 Paris–Roubaix was the 97th running of the Paris–Roubaix single-day cycling race, often known as the Hell of the North. It was held on 11 April 1999 over a distance of 273 kilometres (169.6 miles). These are the results for the 1999 edition of the Paris–Roubaix cycling classic, in which Andrea Tafi won and Mapei–Quick-Step team took all positions in the podium.

== Results ==
11-04-1999: Compiègne–Roubaix, 273 km.

Results (1–10)
	Cyclist	Team	Time
1	Andrea Tafi (ITA)	Mapei–Quick-Step	6h 44' 15"
2	Wilfried Peeters (BEL)	Mapei–Quick-Step	+ 2' 14"
3	Tom Steels (BEL)	Mapei–Quick-Step	+ 2' 26"
4	George Hincapie (USA)	U.S. Postal Service	+ 2' 26"
5	Jo Planckaert (BEL)	Lotto–Mobistar	+ 2' 26"
6	Léon van Bon (NED)	Rabobank	+ 2' 26"
7	Frank Vandenbroucke (BEL)	Cofidis	+ 2' 26"
8	Andrei Tchmil (BEL)	Lotto–Mobistar	+ 2' 40"
9	Johan Museeuw (BEL)	Mapei–Quick-Step	+ 2' 40"
10	Lars Michaelsen (DEN)	Française des Jeux	+ 2' 53"
