= 2000 Paris–Tours =

Race details
- Dates: 8 October 2000
- Stages: 1
- Distance: 254 km (157.8 mi)
- Winning time: 6h 38' 14"

Results
	Winner	Andrea Tafi (ITA)	(Mapei–Quick-Step)
	Second	Andrei Tchmil (BEL)	(Lotto–Adecco)
	Third	Daniele Nardello (ITA)	(Mapei–Quick-Step)

The 2000 Paris–Tours was the 94th edition of the Paris–Tours cycle race and was held on 8 October 2000. The race started in Saint-Arnoult-en-Yvelines and finished in Tours. The race was won by Andrea Tafi of the Mapei team.

== General classification ==
Final general classification

Rank	Rider	Team	Time
1	Andrea Tafi (ITA)	Mapei–Quick-Step	6h 38' 14"
2	Andrei Tchmil (BEL)	Lotto–Adecco	+ 39"
3	Daniele Nardello (ITA)	Mapei–Quick-Step	+ 39"
4	Paolo Bettini (ITA)	Mapei–Quick-Step	+ 1' 36"
5	Gorazd Štangelj (SLO)	Liquigas–Pata	+ 1' 39"
6	Rik Verbrugghe (BEL)	Lotto–Adecco	+ 1' 39"
7	Zbigniew Spruch (POL)	Lampre–Daikin	+ 1' 39"
8	Rolf Sørensen (DEN)	Rabobank	+ 2' 00"
9	Jaan Kirsipuu (EST)	AG2R Prévoyance	+ 2' 05"
10	Alessandro Petacchi (ITA)	Fassa Bortolo	+ 2' 05"
