= 1999 Critérium du Dauphiné Libéré =

Race details
- Dates: 6–13 June 1999
- Stages: 7 + Prologue
- Distance: 1,146.4 km (712.3 mi)
- Winning time: 30h 25' 19"

Results
Jersey awarded to the overall winner	Winner	Alexander Vinokourov (KAZ)	(Casino–Ag2r Prévoyance)
	Second	Jonathan Vaughters (USA)	(U.S. Postal Service)
	Third	Wladimir Belli (ITA)	(Festina–Lotus)
Jersey awarded to the points classification winner	Points	Alexander Vinokourov (KAZ)	(Casino–Ag2r Prévoyance)
Jersey awarded to the mountains classification winner	Mountains	Wladimir Belli (ITA)	(Festina–Lotus)

The 1999 Critérium du Dauphiné Libéré was the 51st edition of the cycle race and was held from 6 June to 13 June 1999. The race started in Autun and finished in Aix-les-Bains. The race was won by Alexander Vinokourov of the Casino team.

== Teams ==
Twelve teams, containing a total of 96 riders, participated in the race:

- Banesto
- Lotto–Mobistar
- U.S. Postal Service
- Festina–Lotus
- Crédit Agricole
- BigMat–Auber 93
- Casino–Ag2r Prévoyance
- Cofidis
- Française des Jeux
- Vitalicio Seguros
- Euskaltel–Euskadi
- Home Market–Charleroi

== Route ==
Stage characteristics and winners
Stage	Date	Course	Distance	Type	Winner
P	6 June	Autun	6.8 km (4.2 mi)	Individual time trial	~~Lance Armstrong (USA)~~ (Note: In 2012, Lance Armstrong was disqualified from his position in the race. He was stripped of all results after 1 August 1998, as a consequence of the Lance Armstrong doping case.)
1	7 June	Autun to La Tour-de-Salvagny	208 km (129 mi)		Christophe Oriol (FRA)
2	8 June	Lyon to Privas	164 km (102 mi)		Alexander Vinokourov (KAZ)
3	9 June	Bédoin to Mont Ventoux	21.6 km (13.4 mi)	Individual time trial	Jonathan Vaughters (USA)
4	10 June	Beaumes-de-Venise to Digne-les-Bains	203 km (126 mi)		Laurent Desbiens (FRA)
5	11 June	Digne-les-Bains to Grenoble	213 km (132 mi)		Laurent Madouas (FRA)
6	12 June	Challes-les-Eaux to Passy Plaine-Joux	177 km (110 mi)		David Moncoutié (FRA)
7	13 June	Sallanches to Aix-les-Bains	153 km (95 mi)		Christophe Bassons (FRA)

== General classification ==
Final general classification

Rank	Rider	Team	Time
1	Alexander Vinokourov (KAZ)	Casino–Ag2r Prévoyance	30h 25' 19"
2	Jonathan Vaughters (USA)	U.S. Postal Service	+ 1' 14"
3	Wladimir Belli (ITA)	Festina–Lotus	+ 3' 48"
4	Joseba Beloki (ESP)	Euskaltel–Euskadi	+ 3' 57"
5	Stéphane Heulot (FRA)	Française des Jeux	+ 4' 35"
6	Kevin Livingston (USA)	U.S. Postal Service	+ 4' 47"
7	Unai Osa (ESP)	Banesto	+ 4' 48"
~~8~~	~~Lance Armstrong (USA)~~	~~U.S. Postal Service~~	~~+ 5' 27"~~
9	François Simon (FRA)	Crédit Agricole	+ 6' 37"
10	Gilles Bouvard (FRA)	Home Market–Ville de Charleroi	+ 6' 41"
