= 1997 Tirreno–Adriatico =

Race details
- Dates: 12–19 March 1997
- Stages: 7 + Prologue
- Distance: 1,032 km (641.3 mi)
- Winning time: 28h 20' 26"

Results
Jersey awarded to the overall winner	Winner	Roberto Petito (ITA)	(Saeco–Estro)
	Second	Gianluca Pianegonda (ITA)	(Mapei–GB)
	Third	Beat Zberg (SUI)	(Mercatone Uno)

The 1997 Tirreno–Adriatico was the 32nd edition of the Tirreno–Adriatico cycle race and was held from 12 March to 19 March 1997. The race started in Sorrento and finished in San Benedetto del Tronto. The race was won by Roberto Petito of the Saeco team.

== Route ==
Stage characteristics and winners
Stage	Date	Course	Distance	Type	Winner
P	12 March	Sorrento	4 km (2.5 mi)	Individual time trial	Rolf Sørensen (DEN)
1	13 March	Sorrento to Venafro	180 km (110 mi)		Endrio Leoni (ITA)
2	14 March	Venafro to Pescasseroli	131 km (81 mi)		Davide Casarotto (ITA)
3	15 March	Pescasseroli to Narni	213 km (132 mi)		Michele Bartoli (ITA)
4	16 March	Circuito delle Marmore (Terni)	117 km (73 mi)		Giovanni Lombardi (ITA)
5	17 March	Ferentillo to Corinaldo	187 km (116 mi)		Andrea Ferrigato (ITA)
6	18 March	Monte Urano to Montegranaro	168 km (104 mi)		Dimitri Konyshev (RUS)
7	19 March	Grottammare to San Benedetto del Tronto	159 km (99 mi)		Mario Traversoni (ITA)

== General classification ==
Final general classification

Rank	Rider	Team	Time
1	Roberto Petito (ITA)	Saeco–Estro	28h 20' 26"
2	Gianluca Pianegonda (ITA)	Mapei–GB	+ 9"
3	Beat Zberg (SUI)	Mercatone Uno	+ 15"
4	Massimiliano Gentili (ITA)	Cantina Tollo–Carrier–Starplast	+ 26"
5	Davide Casarotto (ITA)	Scrigno–Gaerne	+ 27"
6	Vassili Davidenko (RUS)	Kross–Montanari–Selle Italia	+ 51"
7	Massimo Donati (ITA)	Saeco–Estro	+ 1' 28"
8	Michele Bartoli (ITA)	MG Maglificio–Technogym	+ 2' 47"
9	Francesco Casagrande (ITA)	Saeco–Estro	+ 3' 03"
10	Rodolfo Massi (ITA)	Casino	+ 3' 06"
