= Gilles Bouvard =

French cyclist (born 1969)

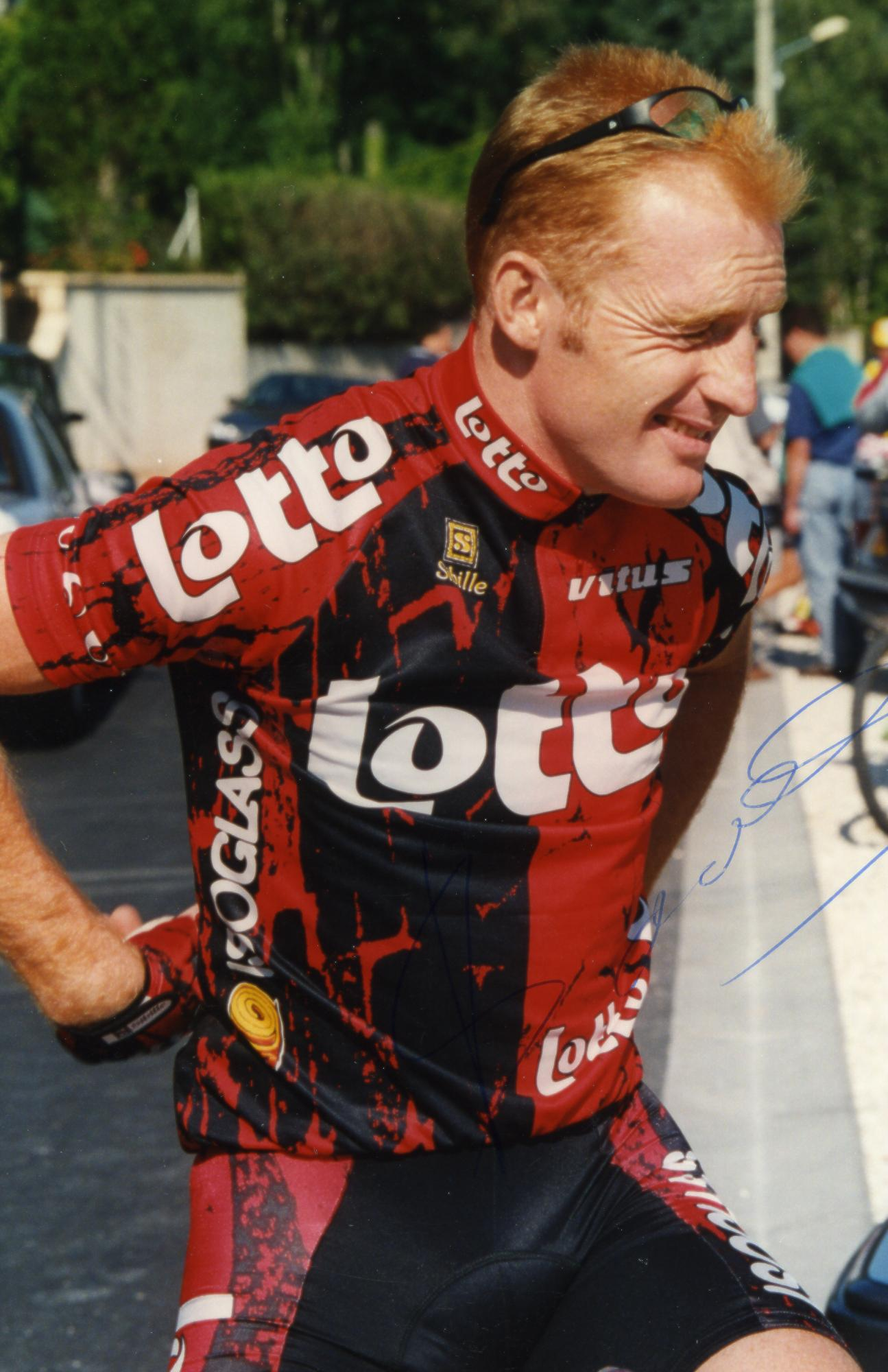
- Bouvard in 1996

Personal information
- Born: 30 October 1969 (age 56) Bourg-en-Bresse, France
- Height: 1.80 m (5 ft 11 in)
- Weight: 70 kg (154 lb)

Cycling career
- Sport: Cycling
- Current team: Retired
- Discipline: Road
- Role: Rider

Amateur teams
- 1990–1991: Dijon OC
- 1992–1993: VC Lyon-Vaulx-en-Velin

Professional teams
- 1994–1995: Chazal–MBK
- 1996: Collstrop–Lystex
- 1996: Lotto
- 1997: Festina–Lotus
- 1998: Casino–Ag2r
- 1999: Home Market–Ville de Charleroi
- 2000–2004: Jean Delatour

Gilles Bouvard (born 30 October 1969) is a French former racing cyclist. He competed in four editions of the Tour de France and one Vuelta a España.

== Major results ==
1993
1st Paris–Mantes
1994
7th Overall Tour de l'Avenir
1995
9th Paris–Camembert
1996
1st Stage 3 Critérium du Dauphiné Libéré
6th Overall Route du Sud
10th Overall Grand Prix du Midi Libre
1997
1st Stage 2b Tour Méditerranéen (TTT)
2nd Grand Prix d'Ouverture La Marseillaise
2nd Overall Tour du Limousin

1st Stage 1

1998
2nd Grand Prix de Rennes
4th Route Adélie
5th Grand Prix d'Ouverture La Marseillaise
7th Overall Grand Prix du Midi Libre
1999
5th Overall Route du Sud
9th Tour du Haut Var
10th Overall Critérium du Dauphiné Libéré
2000
9th A Travers le Morbihan
2001
3rd Overall Regio-Tour
6th Overall Tour du Limousin

1st Stage 4

7th Boucles de l'Aulne
2003
2nd GP Citta 'di Rio Saliceto e Correggio
4th Polynormande
6th Tour du Doubs
9th Boucles de l'Aulne
2004
5th Tour du Finistère

=== Grand Tour general classification results timeline ===
Grand Tour	1995	1996	1997	1998	1999	2000	2001	2002	2003	2004
Giro d'Italia	—	—	—	—	—	—	—	—	—	—
Tour de France	63	DNF	—	—	—	—	53	—	—	128
Vuelta a España	—	—	—	—	—	DNF	—	—	—	—

Legend
—	Did not compete
DNF	Did not finish
