= Pascal Hervé =

French cyclist (1964–2024)

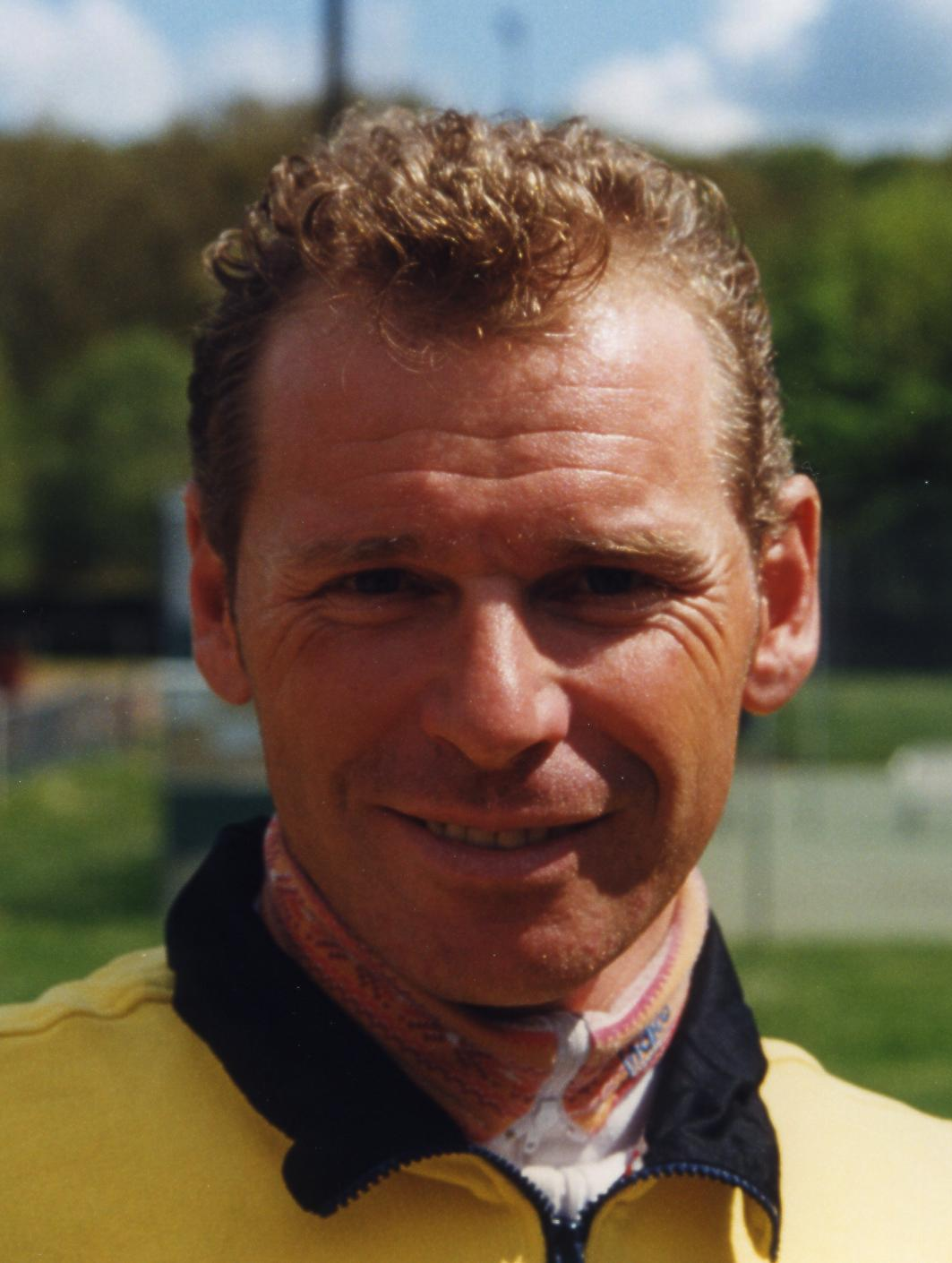
- Hervé in 2000

Personal information
- Full name: Pascal Hervé
- Born: 13 July 1964 Tours, France
- Died: 24 December 2024 (aged 60)
- Height: 1.69 m (5 ft 6 1/2 in)
- Weight: 62 kg (137 lb; 9 st 11 lb)

Cycling career
- Sport: Cycling
- Discipline: Road
- Role: Rider
- Rider type: Climber

Professional teams
- 1994–1999: Festina–Lotus
- 2000: Team Polti
- 2001: Alexia Alluminio

Major wins
- Grand Tours Giro d'Italia 1 individual stage (1996) One-day races and Classics GP Ouest–France (1998)

Pascal Hervé (13 July 1964 – 24 December 2024) was a French road racing cyclist. He competed in the individual road race at the 1992 Summer Olympics and raced as a professional from 1994 to 2001. At the time of his death Pascal resided in Montreal, where he was the co-owner of a training center that helps develop local athletes and amateurs of all ages. In between seasons, he held cycling trips in various locations such as the Pyrénées, the Vosges, the Alps, and, most recently, the region of Charlevoix.

Hervé died on 24 December 2024, at the age of 60 in Montreal. The cause of his death is unknown, although he reportedly underwent surgery last September for a stomach tumour.

== Doping ==
Hervé was expelled from the 1998 Tour de France in the Festina affair.

Hervé tested positive for EPO after the prologue in 2001 Giro d'Italia.

== Major results ==
1992
1st Boucles de la Mayenne
2nd Overall Circuito Montañés
1993
2nd Overall Tour de l'Ain
2nd Overall Tour du Vaucluse
1994
5th Overall Critérium du Dauphiné Libéré

1st Mountains classification
1st Stage 5

5th GP Ouest–France
5th A Travers le Morbihan
6th Road race, National Road Championships
6th Overall Route du Sud
1995
1st Mountains classification Volta a Catalunya
4th Japan Cup
6th Milano–Torino
7th Paris–Camembert
1996
Giro d'Italia

1st Stage 6
Held after Stage 6

1st Mountains classification Volta a la Comunitat Valenciana
2nd Overall Tour of the Basque Country
2nd Overall Tour DuPont

1st Stage 8

2nd Japan Cup
6th Giro del Piemonte
1997
3rd Overall Vuelta Ciclista de Chile

1st Stage 2

3rd Paris–Camembert
5th Overall Critérium International
5th Route Adélie
6th Rund um den Henninger-Turm
10th Overall Tour of the Basque Country
1998
1st GP Ouest–France
1st Trophée des Grimpeurs
1st Stage 3 Tour of the Basque Country
6th Road race, National Road Championships
6th Cholet-Pays de la Loire
7th La Flèche Wallonne
10th Overall Critérium International
10th Overall Route du Sud
1999
2nd Road race, National Road Championships
3rd Prueba Villafranca de Ordizia
2000
1st Polynormande
1st Stage 4 Tour de Suisse
3rd Overall Vuelta a Burgos

1st Points classification

2001
2nd Giro di Toscana
6th Overall Tour de Langkawi
9th Giro dell'Appennino

== See also ==
- List of doping cases in cycling
- List of sportspeople sanctioned for doping offences
