= 1997 Paris–Roubaix =

Race details
- Dates: April 13, 1997
- Stages: 1
- Distance: 266.5 km (165.6 mi)
- Winning time: 6h 38' 10"

Results
	Winner	Frédéric Guesdon (FRA)	(Française des Jeux)
	Second	Jo Planckaert (BEL)	(Lotto–Mobistar–Isoglass)
	Third	Johan Museeuw (BEL)	(Mapei–GB)

The 1997 Paris–Roubaix was the 95th running of the Paris–Roubaix single-day cycling race, often known as the Hell of the North. It was held on 13 April 1997 over a distance of 273 kilometres (169.6 miles). These are the results for the 1997 edition of the Paris–Roubaix cycling classic, in which Frédéric Guesdon won in a final sprint between eight riders.

== Results ==
13-04-1997: Compiègne–Roubaix, 266.5 km (165.6 mi).

Results (1–10)
	Cyclist	Team	Time
1	Frédéric Guesdon (FRA)	Française des Jeux	6h 38' 10"
2	Jo Planckaert (BEL)	Lotto–Mobistar–Isoglass	s.t.
3	Johan Museeuw (BEL)	Mapei–GB	s.t.
4	Andrei Tchmil (UKR)	Lotto–Mobistar–Isoglass	s.t.
5	Davide Casarotto (ITA)	Scrigno–Gaerne	s.t.
6	Rolf Sørensen (DEN)	Rabobank	s.t.
7	Marc Wauters (BEL)	Lotto–Mobistar–Isoglass	s.t.
8	Frédéric Moncassin (FRA)	GAN	s.t.
9	Rolf Aldag (GER)	Team Telekom	+ 14"
10	Henk Vogels (AUS)	GAN	+ 25"
