= 1997 Vuelta Ciclista de Chile =

Race details
- Dates: March 6 – March 16
- Stages: 10
- Distance: 1,557.8 km (968.0 mi)
- Winning time: 37h 55' 47"

Results
	Winner	Patrice Halgand (FRA)	(Festina)
	Second	Félix García (ESP)	(Festina)
	Third	Pascal Hervé (FRA)	(Festina)
	Mountains	Félix García (ESP)	(Festina)
	Team	(France) Festina	

The 20th edition of the Vuelta Ciclista de Chile was held from March 19 to March 29, 1997.

== Stages ==
Stage	Date	Route	Km	Cyclist	Team	Time
Prologue	06-03-1997	La Serena (Coquimbo)	4,4	(Colombia) Santiago Botero	Kelme	4:44
1.	07-03-1997	La Serena (Coquimbo) - Ovalle (Coquimbo)	151,5	(Spain) Félix García	Festina-Lotus	3:43:11
2.	08-03-1997	Los Vilos (Coquimbo) - Limache (Valparaiso)	179,2	(France) Pascal Hervé	Festina-Lotus	4:23:53
3.	09-03-1997	Limache (Valparaiso) - Santiago (Region Metropolitana)	170	(France) Laurent Lefèvre	Festina-Lotus	4:18:00
4.	10-03-1997	Santiago - Santiago (Region Metropolitana)	198	(Spain) Angel Edo	Kelme	5:07:00
5.	11-03-1997	San Javier (Bio-Bio) - Chillan (Bio-Bio)	139	(Italy) Simone Zucchi	Ekono	3:27:05
6.a	12-03-1997	Pemuco (Bio-Bio) - Yungay (Bio-Bio)	19,6 (ITT)	(Argentina) Rubén Pegorín	Mendoza	25:06
6.b	12-03-1997	Pemuco (Bio-Bio) - Concepcion (Bio-Bio)	129,8	(France) Patrice Halgand	Festina-Lotus	3:01:57
7.	13-03-1997	San Pedro (Bio-Bio) - Los Angeles (Bio-Bio)	141,5	(Italy) Simone Zucchi	Ekono	3:04:04
8.	14-03-1997	Bulnes (Bio-Bio) - San Javier (Bio-Bio)	167,3	(Chile) Angel Pérez	Isla de Maipo	4:14:17
9.	15-03-1997	Pelarco (Maule) - Rengo ( O'Higgins)	176,1	(Brazil) Hernandez Quadri	Caloí	4:09:51
10.	16-03-1997	Santiago - Santiago (Region Metropolitana)	81,4	(France) Lilian Levreton	Festina-Lotus	2:48:00

== Final classification ==
RANK	CYCLIST	TEAM	TIME
1.	Patrice Halgand (FRA)	Festina-Lotus	37:55.47
2.	Félix García (ESP)	Festina-Lotus	+04.25
3.	Pascal Hervé (FRA)	Festina-Lotus	+05.17
4.	Lilian Lebreton (FRA)	Festina-Lotus	+05.47
5.	José Medina (CHI)	Curics	+09.13
6.	Santiago Botero (COL)	Kelme	+09.43
7.	Laurent Lefèvre (FRA)	Festina-Lotus	+09.49
8.	Márcio May (BRA)	Caloí	+11.26
9.	Juan Aguirre (CHI)	Chillan	+20.49
10.	Simone Zucchi (ITA)	Ekono	+26.23
