= 1996 Liège–Bastogne–Liège =

Race details
- Dates: 21 April 1996
- Stages: 1
- Distance: 263 km (163 mi)
- Winning time: 6h 58' 02"

Results
	Winner	Pascal Richard (SUI)	(MG Maglificio–Technogym)
	Second	Lance Armstrong (USA)	(Motorola)
	Third	Mauro Gianetti (SUI)	(Team Polti)

The 1996 Liège–Bastogne–Liège was the 82nd edition of the Liège–Bastogne–Liège cycle race and was held on 21 April 1996. The race started in Liège and finished in Ans. The race was won by Pascal Richard of the MG Maglificio team.

== General classification ==
Final general classification

Rank	Rider	Team	Time
1	Pascal Richard (SUI)	MG Maglificio–Technogym	6h 58' 02"
2	Lance Armstrong (USA)	Motorola	+ 0"
3	Mauro Gianetti (SUI)	Team Polti	+ 0"
4	Laurent Madouas (FRA)	Motorola	+ 1' 06"
5	Fabiano Fontanelli (ITA)	MG Maglificio–Technogym	+ 1' 19"
6	Davide Rebellin (ITA)	Team Polti	+ 1' 22"
7	Axel Merckx (BEL)	Motorola	+ 1' 36"
8	Richard Virenque (FRA)	Festina–Lotus	+ 1' 52"
9	Rolf Sørensen (DEN)	Rabobank	+ 1' 52"
10	Gabriele Colombo (ITA)	Gewiss Playbus	+ 2' 01"
