= 1997 Clásica de San Sebastián =

Race details
- Dates: 9 August 1997
- Stages: 1
- Distance: 234 km (145.4 mi)
- Winning time: 5h 47' 22"

Results
	Winner	Davide Rebellin (ITA)	(Française des Jeux)
	Second	Alexander Gontchenkov (RUS)	(Roslotto–ZG Mobili)
	Third	Stefano Colagè (ITA)	(Refin–Mobilvetta)

The 1997 Clásica de San Sebastián was the 17th edition of the Clásica de San Sebastián cycle race and was held on 9 August 1997. The race started and finished in San Sebastián. The race was won by Davide Rebellin of the Française des Jeux team.

== General classification ==
Final general classification

Rank	Rider	Team	Time
1	Davide Rebellin (ITA)	Française des Jeux	5h 47' 22"
2	Alexander Gontchenkov (RUS)	Roslotto–ZG Mobili	+ 0"
3	Stefano Colagè (ITA)	Refin–Mobilvetta	+ 0"
4	Maurizio Fondriest (ITA)	Cofidis	+ 0"
5	Gianluca Bortolami (ITA)	Festina–Lotus	+ 0"
6	Rolf Sørensen (DEN)	Rabobank	+ 0"
7	Beat Zberg (SUI)	Mercatone Uno	+ 0"
8	Jens Heppner (GER)	Team Telekom	+ 0"
9	Richard Virenque (FRA)	Festina–Lotus	+ 0"
10	Giuseppe Tartaggia (ITA)	Batik–Del Monte	+ 0"
