= 2001 Grand Prix de Denain =

Race details
- Dates: 26 April 2001
- Stages: 1
- Distance: 190.6 km (118.4 mi)
- Winning time: 4h 22' 37"

Results
	Winner	Jaan Kirsipuu (EST)
	Second	Davide Casarotto (ITA)
	Third	Frédéric Guesdon (FRA)

The 2001 Grand Prix de Denain was the 43rd edition of the Grand Prix de Denain cycle race and was held on 26 April 2001. The race was won by Jaan Kirsipuu.

== General classification ==
Final general classification

Rank	Rider	Time
1	Jaan Kirsipuu (EST)	4h 22' 37"
2	Davide Casarotto (ITA)	+ 0"
3	Frédéric Guesdon (FRA)	+ 4"
4	Christophe Capelle (FRA)	+ 2' 17"
5	Damien Nazon (FRA)	+ 2' 17"
6	Alessandro Bertolini (ITA)	+ 2' 17"
7	Ludovic Capelle (BEL)	+ 2' 17"
8	Frédéric Finot (FRA)	+ 2' 17"
9	Allan Johansen (DEN)	+ 2' 17"
10	Laurent Brochard (FRA)	+ 2' 17"
