= Gabriele Colombo =

Italian cyclist

Personal information
- Full name: Gabriele Colombo
- Born: 11 May 1972 (age 54) Varese, Italy

Cycling career
- Sport: Cycling
- Discipline: Road
- Role: Rider

Professional teams
- 1994–1997: Gewiss–Ballan
- 1998: Ballan
- 1999–2002: Cantina Tollo–Alexia Alluminio
- 2003–2007: Domina Vacanze–Elitron

Major wins
- Grand Tours Tour de France 1 TTT stage (1995) One-day races and Classics Milan–San Remo (1996)

Gabriele Colombo (born 11 May 1972) is an Italian former professional road bicycle racer. He won the Milan–San Remo in 1996.

== Major results ==
1990
6th Road race, UCI Junior Road World Championships
1993
7th Giro del Belvedere
1994
3rd Gran Premio di Lugano
1995
1st Stage 3 (TTT) Tour de France
3rd Overall Vuelta a Burgos

1st Stage 2

6th Overall Tirreno–Adriatico
8th GP Industria & Artigianato di Larciano
10th Overall Volta a la Comunitat Valenciana
1996
1st Overall Settimana Internazionale di Coppi e Bartali
1st Overall Giro di Sardegna
1st Overall Giro di Calabria

1st Stage 1

1st Milan–San Remo
2nd Gran Premio di Chiasso
4th Trofeo Laigueglia
5th Overall Tirreno–Adriatico
5th La Flèche Wallonne
5th Rund um den Henninger Turm
6th Telekom Grand Prix (with Evgeni Berzin)
7th Monte Carlo–Alassio
8th Firenze–Pistoia
9th Giro dell'Appennino
10th Liège–Bastogne–Liège
10th Giro della Provincia di Reggio Calabria
1997
2nd Trofeo Pantalica
3rd Liège–Bastogne–Liège
6th Gran Premio de Llodio
7th Giro della Romagna
8th Overall Volta ao Alentejo
1998
1st Stage 4 Tirreno–Adriatico
1st Stage 6 Four Days of Dunkirk
7th Trofeo Laigueglia
2000
1st Stage 5a Tour of the Basque Country
4th Overall Setmana Catalana de Ciclisme

1st Stage 2

5th Overall Vuelta a Aragón
9th Overall Tirreno–Adriatico
2001
2nd Overall Tirreno–Adriatico
4th Overall Vuelta a Murcia
6th Milan–San Remo
2003
2nd GP Industria & Artigianato Larciano
