= Davide Casarotto =

Italian cyclist

Personal information
- Born: 19 July 1971 (age 55) Vicenza, Italy
- Height: 1.80 m (5 ft 11 in)

Cycling career
- Sport: Cycling
- Discipline: Road
- Role: Rider

Professional teams
- 1996–1998: Scrigno–Blue Storm
- 1999: TVM–Farm Frites
- 2000–2003: Alessio

Davide Casarotto (born 19 July 1971 in Vicenza) is an Italian former road cyclist, who competed as a professional from 1996 to 2003.

== Major results ==
1995
1st Giro d'Oro
1996
1st Gran Premio della Liberazione
1997
1st Stage 2 Tirreno–Adriatico
3rd Gran Premio Industria e Commercio di Prato
3rd Grand Prix de Wallonie
3rd GP Industria & Artigianato di Larciano
5th Tour of Flanders
5th Paris–Roubaix
2000
1st Stage 4 Deutschland Tour
2001
1st Grand Prix de Rennes
1st Stage 2 Vuelta a Aragón
2nd Grand Prix de Denain
2002
1st Stage 5 Bayern-Rundfahrt
