= 1997 Amstel Gold Race =

Dutch cycling race

1997 UCI Road World Cup, race 5 of 10

Race details
- Dates: 26 April 1997
- Stages: 1
- Distance: 258 km (160 mi)
- Winning time: 6h 11' 19"

Results
	Winner	Bjarne Riis (DEN)	(Team Telekom)
	Second	Andrea Tafi (ITA)	(Mapei–GB)
	Third	Beat Zberg (SUI)	(Mercatone Uno)

The 1997 Amstel Gold Race was the 32nd edition of the annual Amstel Gold Race road bicycle race, held on Sunday April 26, 1997, in the Dutch province of Limburg. The race stretched 258 kilometres, with the start in Heerlen and the finish in Maastricht. The race was the third fastest edition ever with an average speed of 41.689kmh.

== Teams ==
Twenty-two teams participated in the race. There were a total number of 191 competitors, with 80 cyclists finishing the race.

- GAN
- Team Polti
- Foreldorado-Golff
- Scrigno–Gaerne
- Kross–Montanari–Selle Italia
- Lotto–Mobistar–Isoglass
- Banesto
- Refin–Mobilvetta
- Asics–CGA
- MG Maglificio–Technogym
- U.S. Postal Service
- Saeco–Estro
- Rabobank
- ONCE
- Mercatone Uno
- Mapei–GB
- Team Telekom
- Batik–Del Monte
- Française des Jeux
- Festina–Lotus
- TVM–Farm Frites
- Cofidis
- Casino

== Pre-race favorites ==
Laurent Jalabert, who had not raced the Amstel Gold Race since Amstel Gold Race where he vowed never to race it again, was considered the favourite to win. With current Vuelta a España champion Alex Zulle as his closest rival even though they both ride for ONCE. Other main contenders were expected to be; Michele Bartoli (MG Maglificio–Technogym), Bjarne Riis (Team Telekom), Johan Museeuw (Mapei–GB), Peter van Petegem (TVM–Farm Frites), Erik Zabel (Team Telekom) and Rolf Sorensen (Rabobank).

== Race summary ==
The race started at 10am local time with the weather being heavy cloud and a cool 9 degrees Celsius, there was a possibility for a light shower. A small breakaway of three riders got away early they were John Talen (Foreldorado-Golff), Fabio Roscioli (Asics–CGA) and Frédéric Bessy (Casino). (Note: The source doesn't list which rider only that the announcers says Bessy and it is most likely Frédéric.) After three hours of racing the trio had a gap of 5'45" to a chasing group containing Rolf Aldag (Team Telekom), Rolf Järmann (Casino), Marc Wauters (Lotto–Mobistar–Isoglass) and Erik Dekker (Rabobank). Then a further 1' 51" back to the peloton.

By the time they reached the Gulpenerberg, the gap the leaders had on the peloton had reduced to 1'20" with a new duo 50" behind them. Ten minutes later the all the riders were back together. More riders attack but are all eventually caught by the Peloton. At 65km to go, a group of 17 riders including some of the favorites created a small gap. Both Jalabert and Zulle missed the move. Mauro Gianetti (Française des Jeux) and Laurent Roux (TVM–Farm Frites) attack over the Cauberg gaining 6 seconds over the rest of the bunch. Riis responded and rides across the gap to the leaders, five more riders came across later.

The eight riders were together over the Muizenberg when Riis headed to the back of the bunch and looked for his team car. He had a front wheel puncture, and gave a rude gesture to his team manager for taking so long to change his tire. Riis had to chase back to the leaders flying past them and attacking as he caught them. Riis gains an advantage of 41 seconds holding his lead to the line. The group behind Riis splintered over the final climbs with Tafi winning the sprint for second. He became the first Danish winner of the race.

== Results ==
	Cyclist	Team	Time
1	Bjarne Riis (DEN)	Team Telekom	6h 11' 19"
2	Andrea Tafi (ITA)	Mapei–GB	+ 46"
3	Beat Zberg (SUI)	Mercatone Uno	s.t.
4	Laurent Roux (FRA)	TVM–Farm Frites	s.t.
5	Mauro Gianetti (SUI)	Française des Jeux	s.t.
6	Michele Bartoli (ITA)	MG Maglificio–Technogym	+ 47"
7	Laurent Jalabert (FRA)	ONCE	+ 48"
8	Andrei Tchmil (UKR)	Lotto–Mobistar–Isoglass	+ 1' 08"
9	Rolf Aldag (GER)	Team Telekom	s.t.
10	Rolf Sørensen (DEN)	Rabobank	s.t.
