= Andrea Tafi (cyclist) =

Italian cyclist

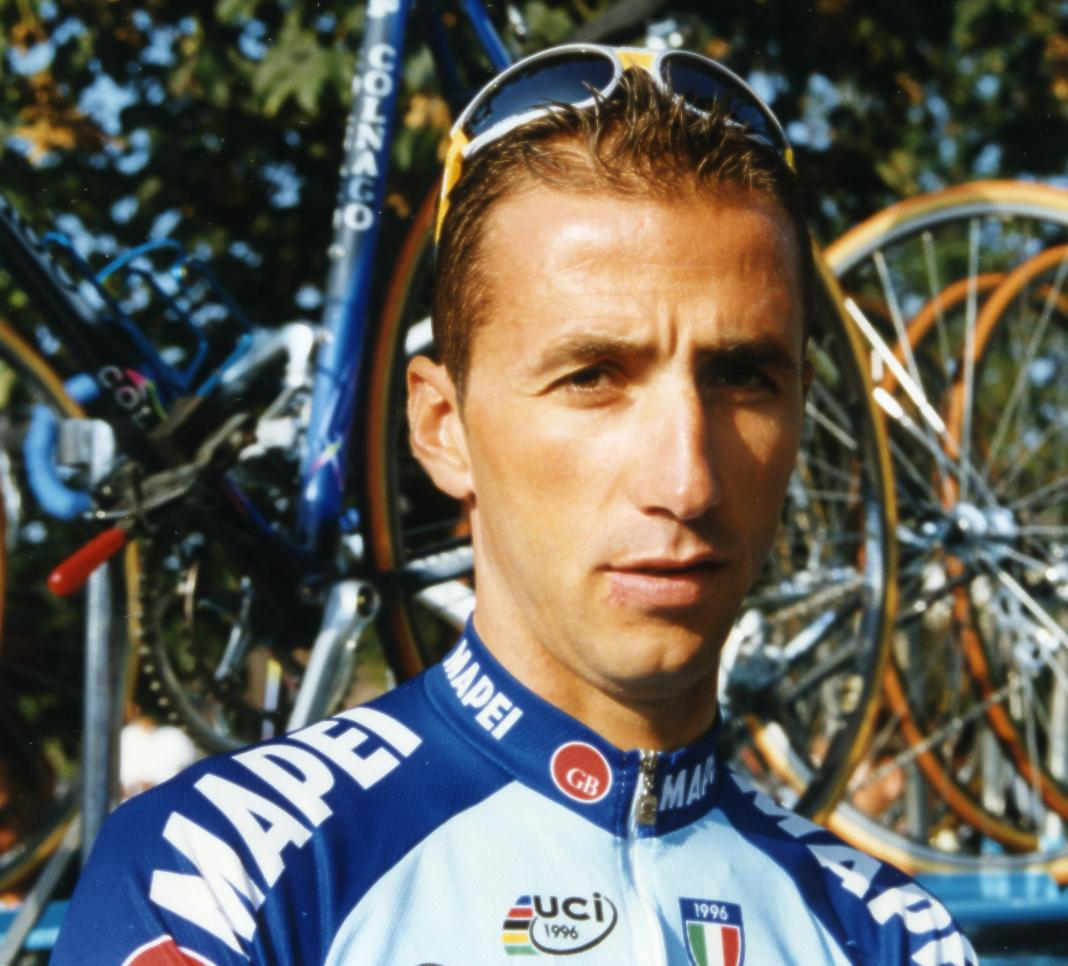
- Tafi at the 1996 Paris–Tours

Personal information
- Full name: Andrea Tafi
- Nickname: Il Gladiatore
- Born: 7 May 1966 (age 60) Fucecchio, Italy
- Height: 1.87 m (6 ft 1 1/2 in)
- Weight: 73 kg (161 lb; 11 st 7 lb)

Cycling career
- Sport: Cycling
- Discipline: Road
- Role: Rider
- Rider type: Classics specialist

Professional teams
- 1989: Eurocar
- 1990–1991: Selle Italia–Eurocar
- 1992–1993: Carrera Jeans–Vagabond
- 1994–2002: Mapei–CLAS
- 2003: Team CSC
- 2004: Alessio–Bianchi
- 2005: Saunier Duval–Prodir

Major wins
- One-day races and Classics National Road Race Championships (1998) Giro di Lombardia (1996) Paris–Roubaix (1999) Tour of Flanders (2002) Paris–Brussels (1996) Wincanton Classic (1997) Giro del Piemonte (1999) Paris–Tours (2000)

Andrea Tafi (born 7 May 1966, in Fucecchio) is an Italian former road bicycle racer who retired from his professional career in 2005. Tafi's propensity to perform best in the harder races earned him the nickname "Il Gladiatore" (English: "The Gladiator").

Tafi specialised in the cobbled Spring Classics such as Paris–Roubaix, which he won in 1999, and Tour of Flanders, which he won in 2002. He won the Giro di Lombardia in 1996 and the Italian National Championship in 1998.

== Career ==
The most successful part of Tafi's career was spent with the Italian super-squad Mapei–CLAS. In the 1996 edition of Paris–Roubaix, the team put four of their riders in a breakaway at the front of the race: Johan Museeuw, Gianluca Bortolami, previous year's winner Franco Ballerini, and Tafi. Ballerini had a flat and was out of the lead group, but the other three powered their way to the finish.

In 1996, Tafi won the "race of the falling leaves" Giro di Lombardia, using his strength to overcome the climbs of the race. He said that his dream was to emulate his cycling hero fellow Italian Francesco Moser, which is to win Paris–Roubaix wearing the Tricolore jersey as the Italian National Champion. He accomplished this in his win in 1999. He won Paris–Tours in a long breakaway effort in 2000, foiling the sprinters' teams. After a few lacklustre years, he again shone in the 2002 edition of the hilly, cobbled classic Tour of Flanders. Having established himself in a front breakaway with the likes of Johan Museeuw, Peter van Petegem and teammate Daniele Nardello, he made attack after attack, finally taking advantage of a moment's hesitation between the two home favourites Museeuw and van Petegem to solo to the finish for the win.

After the demise of the Mapei super-team, Tafi moved to the reformed Team CSC under Bjarne Riis for the 2003 season. His time with the team Alessio–Bianchi in 2004 also didn't re-ignite his performance. He finally moved to the new Saunier Duval–Prodir team for his last season in 2005. Tafi ended his career at the 2005 Paris–Roubaix, before retiring from the sport.

=== Comeback attempt ===
Having competed in amateur Masters races for several years, Tafi announced in October 2018 that he would seek a comeback in 2019 to race Paris–Roubaix on the twentieth anniversary of his victory. On 8 November 2018, it was reported that he had found a team to ride with and that would attempt to receive a wildcard invitation for the event. Would his comeback have been successful, he would have been 52 years old when riding the race. A collarbone fracture eventually put an end to Tafi's comeback plans.

== Doping ==
Tafi's name was on the list of doping tests published by the French Senate on 24 July 2013 that were collected during the 1998 Tour de France and found positive for EPO when retested in 2004.

== Major results ==
1989
1st Stage 4 Vuelta a Murcia
8th Firenze–Pistoia
10th Overall Tour de Luxembourg

1st Stage 5

1990
1st Stage 2 Kellogg's Tour
3rd Overall Ruota d'Oro
6th Firenze–Pistoia
1991
1st Giro del Lazio
7th Firenze–Pistoia
1992
1st Overall Cronostaffetta
1993
9th Firenze–Pistoia
1994
1st Grand Prix de Fourmies
1st GP Citta di Rio Saliceto e Correggio
3rd Coppa Bernocchi
4th Milano–Vignola
5th Coppa Placci
1995
3rd Road race, National Road Championships
3rd GP Industria & Commercio di Prato
4th Rund um den Henninger Turm
5th Giro di Toscana
6th Giro del Lazio
9th Giro dell'Emilia
1996
1st Giro di Lombardia
1st Paris–Brussels
1st Giro del Lazio
1st Trofeo Melinda
1st Coppa Placci
2nd Tre Valli Varesine
2nd Giro del Piemonte
2nd Giro del Veneto
3rd Paris–Roubaix
4th Overall UCI Road World Cup
4th Coppa Sabatini
4th Japan Cup
5th Gran Premio Città di Camaiore
6th Road race, UCI Road World Championships
8th Leeds International Classic
1997
1st Rochester International Classic
1st Grand Prix de Fourmies
1st Coppa Sabatini
Tour de Langkawi

1st Stages 3 & 9

2nd Amstel Gold Race
2nd Japan Cup
3rd Overall UCI Road World Cup
3rd Paris–Brussels
5th Giro del Lazio
6th Overall Tour of Galicia
7th Giro di Lombardia
7th Gran Premio Città di Camaiore
8th Trofeo Matteotti
1998
1st Road race, National Road Championships
1st Giro del Lazio
1st Coppa Agostoni
1st Gran Premio Città di Camaiore
2nd Paris–Roubaix
3rd Overall UCI Road World Cup
4th Clásica de San Sebastián
4th Züri–Metzgete
4th Japan Cup
5th Overall Tour de Langkawi

1st Stage 1 (ITT)

8th Road race, UCI Road World Championships
8th Paris–Brussels
8th Giro dell'Emilia
9th Milano–Torino
10th Giro di Lombardia
1999
1st Paris–Roubaix
1st Giro del Piemonte
3rd Millemetri del Corso di Mestre
4th Firenze–Pistoia
2000
1st Paris–Tours
6th Gran Premio Bruno Beghelli
10th Paris–Roubaix
2001
1st Stage 1 Vuelta a Burgos
2nd Firenze–Pistoia
8th Giro della Provincia di Siracusa
2002
1st Tour of Flanders
8th Overall Tour Down Under
10th GP Ouest–France
2003
5th Paris–Roubaix
