= Giuseppe Tartaggia =

Italian cyclist

Personal information
- Born: 15 June 1971 (age 55)

Cycling career
- Sport: Cycling
- Current team: Retired
- Discipline: Road
- Role: Rider

Professional team
- 1996–1997: Gewiss Playbus

Giuseppe Tartaggia (born 15 June 1971) is an Italian former racing cyclist. He rode in the 1997 Tour de France, finishing 97th overall.

== Major results ==
1990
1st Coppa Città di Asti
1995
1st Gran Premio Industria e Commercio Artigianato Carnaghese
1997
6th Coppa Agostoni
7th Tour du Haut Var
10th Clásica de San Sebastián
