= Rolf Sørensen =

Danish cyclist (born 1965)

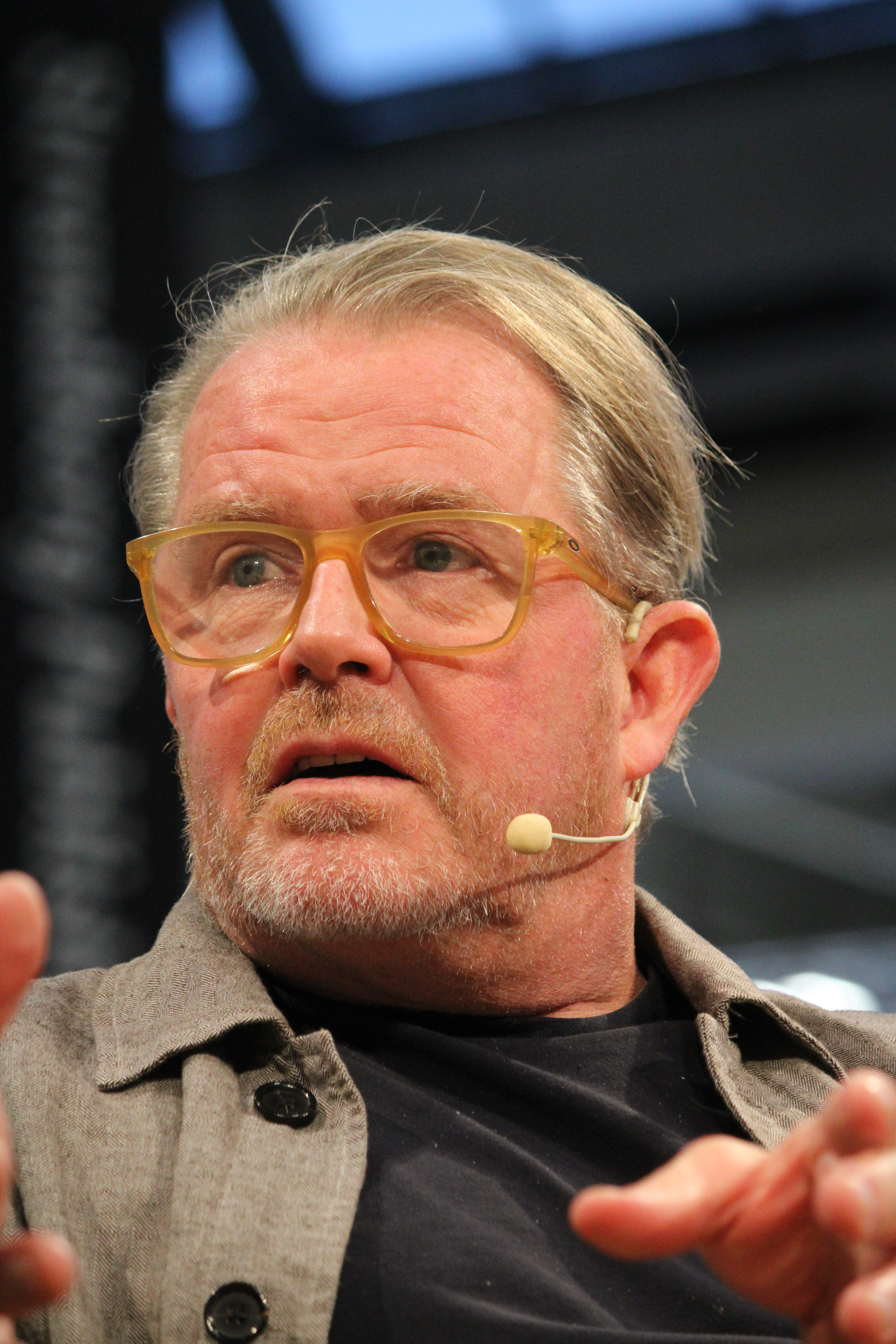
- Sørensen in 2025

Personal information
- Full name: Rolf Sørensen
- Nickname: Il Biondo
- Born: 20 April 1965 (age 61) Helsinge, Denmark
- Height: 1.78 m (5 ft 10 in)
- Weight: 70 kg (154 lb; 11 st 0 lb)

Cycling career
- Sport: Cycling
- Discipline: Road
- Role: Rider

Professional teams
- 1986–1987: Fanini
- 1988–1992: Ariostea
- 1993: Carrera Jeans–Tassoni
- 1994–1995: GB–MG Maglificio
- 1996–2000: Rabobank
- 2001: CSC–Tiscali
- 2002: Landbouwkrediet–Colnago

Major wins
- Grand Tours Tour de France 2 individual stages (1994, 1996) 2 TTT stages (1991, 1994) Giro d'Italia 1 individual stage (1995) 1 TTT stage (1989) Stage races Tirreno–Adriatico (1987, 1992) One-day races and Classics Liège–Bastogne–Liège (1993) Tour of Flanders (1997) Paris–Tours (1990) Paris–Brussels (1992, 1994) Milano–Torino (1993) Kuurne–Brussels–Kuurne (1996)
Medal record
Representing Denmark
Men's road bicycle racing
Olympic Games
Silver medal – second place	1996 Atlanta	Individual Road Race

Rolf Sørensen (born 20 April 1965) is a Danish former professional road bicycle racer. He is currently working as a cycling commentator and agent. Born in Helsinge in Denmark, Sørensen moved to Italy at the age of 17, where he has lived since. He goes under the name Il Biondo due to his blonde hair.

== Accomplishments ==
Sørensen won such classic one-day races as the Tour of Flanders, Liège–Bastogne–Liège, Paris–Brussels, Paris–Tours and Milano–Torino, as well as slightly smaller races like the Coppa Bernocchi (twice), and the Rund um den Henninger Turm or Grand Prix Frankfurt. He has led the UCI Road World Cup on several occasions, finishing third in 1989 and 1991 and second in 1997 after a broken foot kept him from scoring points in the last two World Cup races of the season.

Sørensen also won individual stages in the 1994 and 1996 Tour de France, and wore the yellow jersey as the leader of the race after the team time trial in 1991, won by his Italian team Ariostea. He kept it until he broke his collar bone in a fall four days later.

Rolf Sørensen participated in the Tour de France seven times, the last time being in 2001. He has also won a number of stages in other stage races, among them stage 9 of the 1995 Giro d'Italia, three stages in the Tour of the Basque Country, six stages in Tirreno–Adriatico, two in the Tour de Suisse, and two in the Tour de Romandie.

Sørensen also claimed the silver medal at the 1996 Olympics.

== Doping ==
For many years, Sørensen denied that he used performance-enhancing drugs, but more than a decade after the end of his career as a professional cyclist, he admitted using EPO, and to some extent, Cortisone. He broke the news to Danish TV2 on 18 March 2013.

== Personal life ==
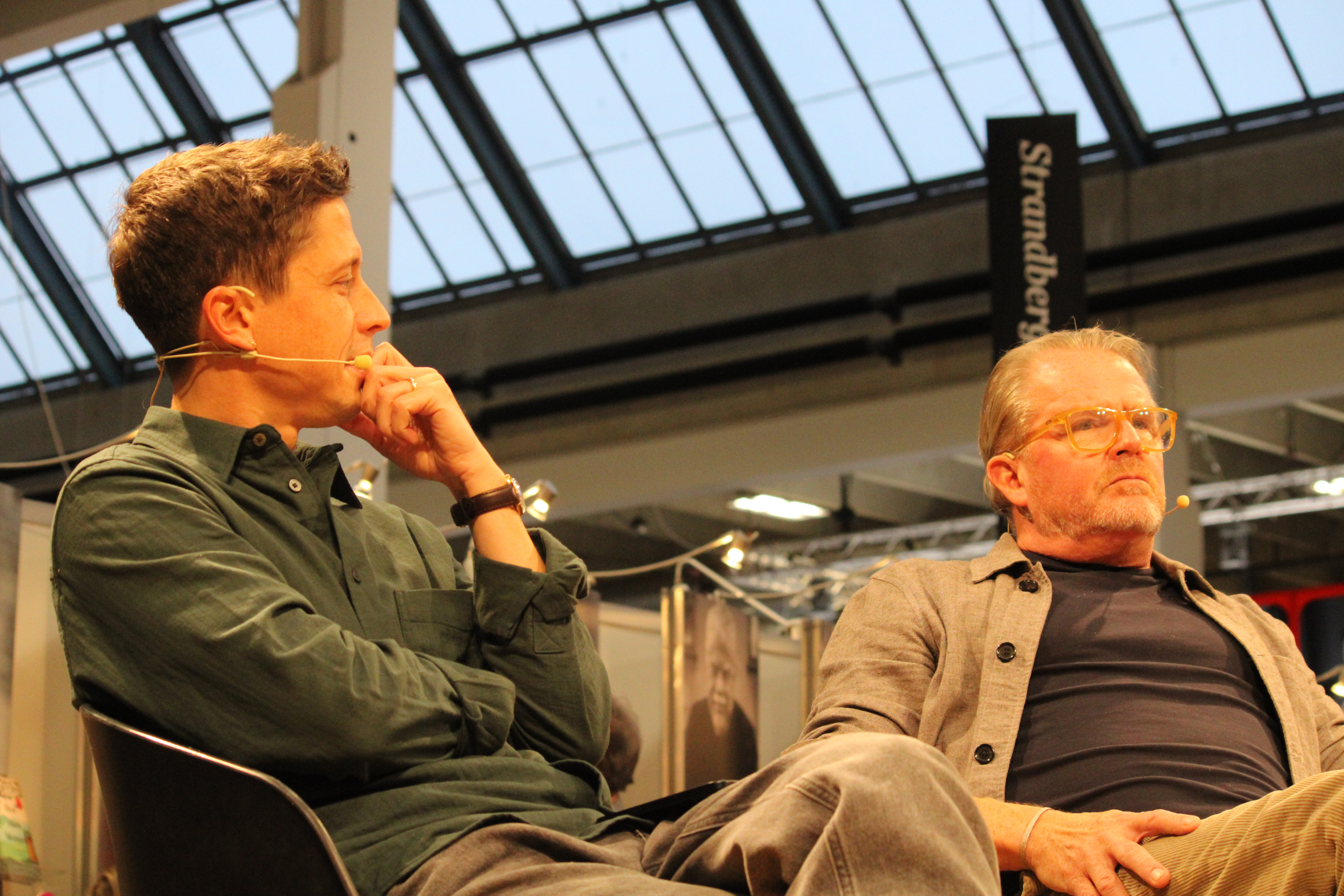
Sørensen with Rasmus Staghøj at Bogforum 2025

Rolf is the son of cyclist Jens Sørensen, who competed for Denmark at the 1960 Summer Olympics in the team pursuit.

== Career achievements ==
=== Major results ===
1986
1st Points classification Danmark Rundt
9th Milan–San Remo
1987
1st Overall Tirreno–Adriatico
1st Grand Prix Pino Cerami
2nd Overall Danmark Rundt

1st Young rider classification

3rd Overall Settimana Internazionale di Coppi e Bartali
1988
1st Gran Premio Città di Camaiore
2nd Overall Danmark Rundt

1st Points classification
1st Young rider classification

2nd Züri–Metzgete
2nd Rund um den Henninger Turm
2nd Points classification Giro d'Italia
3rd Overall Tirreno–Adriatico
3rd Giro dell'Emilia
3rd Grand Prix Pino Cerami
8th Liège–Bastogne–Liège
1989
1st Stage 3 (TTT) Giro d'Italia
1st Coppa Bernocchi
1st Giro dell'Etna
2nd Coppa Ugo Agostoni
3rd Gent–Wevelgem
4th Tour of Flanders
4th Züri–Metzgete
9th Rund um den Henninger Turm
1990
1st Overall Settimana Internazionale di Coppi e Bartali
1st Paris–Tours
1st Trofeo Laigueglia
2nd Coppa Bernocchi
6th Züri–Metzgete
6th Tre Valli Varesine
7th Milano–Torino
1991
Tour de France

1st Stage 2 (TTT)
Held after Stage 2-5

1st Stage 9 Tour de Suisse
2nd Milan–San Remo
3rd UCI Road World Cup
3rd Tour of Flanders
3rd Liège–Bastogne–Liège
5th Giro di Lombardia
1992
1st Overall Tirreno–Adriatico

1st Stage 3

1st Paris–Brussels
5th Giro di Lombardia
7th Rund um den Henninger Turm
9th Milano–Torino
10th Milan–San Remo
1993
1st Liège–Bastogne–Liège
1st Milano–Torino
1st Rund um den Henninger Turm
1st Coppa Bernocchi
1st Stage 7 Tirreno–Adriatico
1st Stage 9 Tour de Suisse
1st Stage 3a Three Days of De Panne
Tour de Romandie

1st Stage 1, 2 & 6

2nd Overall Tour of the Basque Country
5th Milan–San Remo
6th La Flèche Wallonne
1994
Tour de France

1st Stages 3 (TTT) & 14

1st Paris–Brussels
1st Trofeo Laigueglia
6th Overall Tirreno–Adriatico
6th Road race, UCI Road World Championships
1995
1st Stage 9 Giro d'Italia
2nd Overall Three Days of De Panne
2nd Milano–Torino
2nd Points classification Giro d'Italia
3rd Paris–Brussels
4th Giro di Lombardia
5th Giro dell'Emilia
8th Liège–Bastogne–Liège
9th Road race, UCI Road World Championships
1996
1st Stage 13 Tour de France
1st Overall Ronde van Nederland

1st Stage 4

1st Kuurne–Brussels–Kuurne
1st Stage 7 Tirreno–Adriatico
2nd Overall Danmark Rundt
2nd Road race, Olympic Games
3rd Rund um den Henninger Turm
9th Liège–Bastogne–Liège
9th Paris–Brussels
9th De Brabantse Pijl
1997
1st Tour of Flanders
1st Prologue Tirreno–Adriatico
1st Stage 3b Three Days of De Panne
2nd UCI Road World Cup
3rd Züri–Metzgete
4th Kuurne–Brussels–Kuurne
6th Paris–Roubaix
8th Milan–San Remo
10th Amstel Gold Race
1998
1st Overall Ronde van Nederland
2nd Overall Danmark Rundt
4th Overall Tirreno–Adriatico

1st Stage 5

4th Overall Three Days of De Panne
6th Paris–Roubaix
1999
2nd Overall Danmark Rundt

1st Stage 1

4th Overall Three Days of De Panne
7th Kuurne–Brussels–Kuurne
2000
1st Overall Danmark Rundt
3rd De Brabantse Pijl
8th Milan–San Remo
8th Paris–Tours
2001
4th Tour of Flanders
10th Milan–San Remo
10th Paris–Roubaix
2002
6th Tour of Flanders

=== Monuments results timeline ===
Monument	1986	1987	1988	1989	1990	1991	1992	1993	1994	1995	1996	1997	1998	1999	2000	2001	2002
Milan–San Remo	9	10	27	20	14	2	10	5	13	16	45	8	—	25	8	10	—
Tour of Flanders	—	65	34	4	—	3	83	15	—	22	9	1	20	16	14	4	6
Paris–Roubaix	—	—	—	—	53	51	—	—	—	—	6	6	15	41	10	—	—
Liège–Bastogne–Liège	—	—	8	—	34	3	46	1	—	8	9	18	68	26	—	—	—
Giro di Lombardia	—	—	—	—	33	5	5	—	—	4	—	—	25	12	—	—	—

=== Grand Tour general classification results timeline ===
Grand Tour	1987	1988	1989	1990	1991	1992	1993	1994	1995	1996	1997	1998	1999	2000	2001	2002
Giro d'Italia	—	42	DNF	—	DNF	—	—	30	61	—	—	—	—	—	—	124
Tour de France	—	—	–	–	DNF	—	70	19	–	28	68	–	–	–	141	–
Vuelta a España	–	—	—	—	—	—	—	—	–	—	—	59	DNF	—	—	—

Legend
—	Did not compete
DNF	Did not finish
