= Stéphane Heulot =

French cyclist (born 1971)

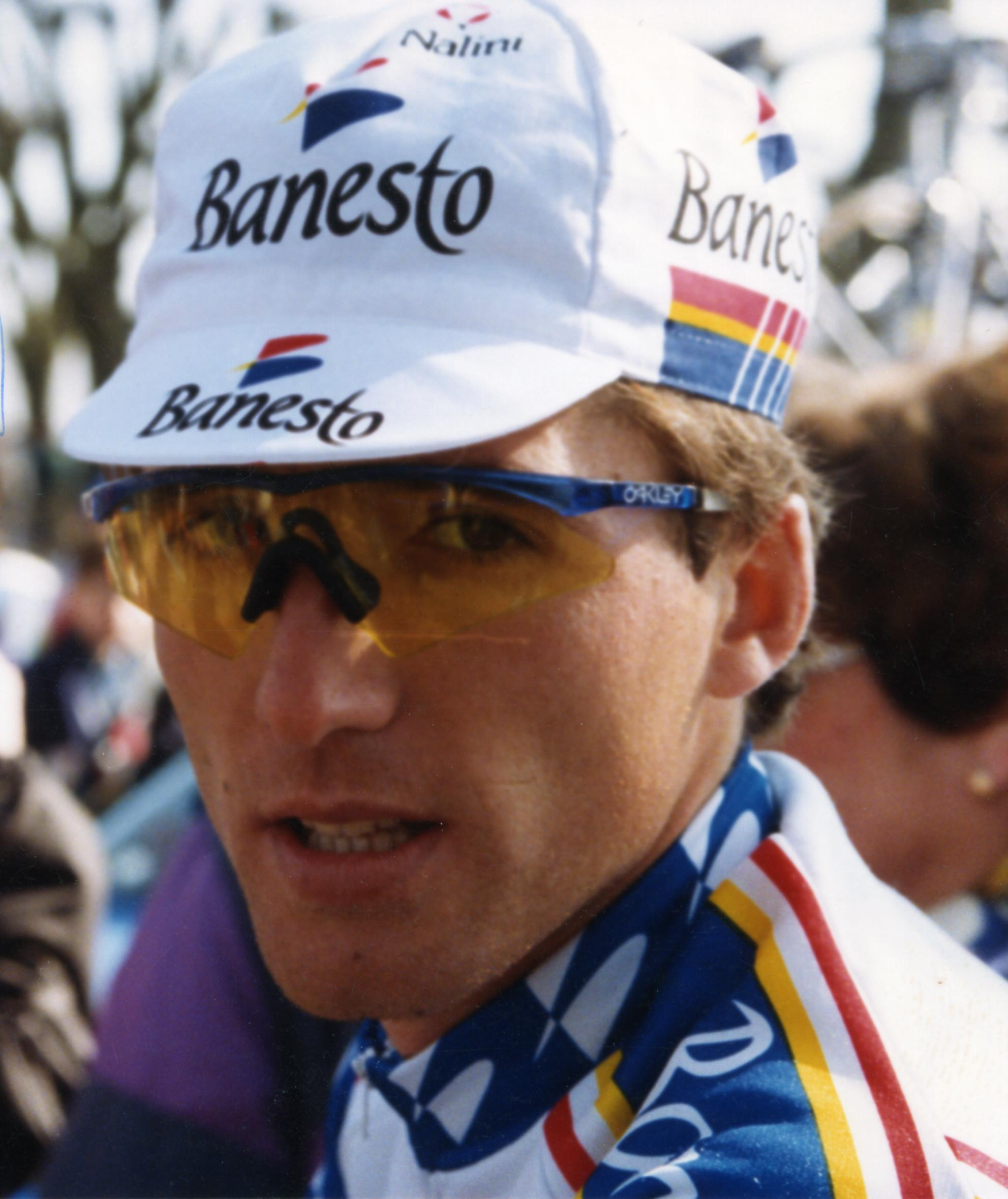
- Heulot at the 1993 Paris–Nice

Personal information
- Full name: Stéphane Heulot
- Born: 20 September 1971 (age 55) Rennes, France
- Height: 1.81 m (5 ft 11 1/2 in)
- Weight: 69 kg (152 lb; 10 st 12 lb)

Cycling career
- Sport: Cycling
- Current team: Lotto–Intermarché
- Discipline: Road
- Role: Rider; Directeur sportif; General manager

Amateur team
- 1991: ASPTT Paris

Professional teams
- 1992: RMO
- 1993–1995: Banesto
- 1996: GAN
- 1997–2000: Française des Jeux
- 2001–2002: BigMat–Auber 93

Managerial teams
- 2009–2013: Besson Chaussures–Sojasun
- 2014: Cannondale
- 2019–2021: Rally UHC Cycling
- 2023–: Lotto–Dstny

Major wins
- One-day races and classics National Road Race Championships (1996)

Stéphane Heulot (born 20 September 1971) is a French former road racing cyclist. Born in Rennes, Heulot wore the yellow jersey in the 1996 Tour de France during three stages. He also won the French National Road Race Championships in 1996. He was the manager of French cycling team Sojasun between 2009 and 2013. He joined Cannondale in February 2014 as the team's Performance Development Director. From 2019 to 2021, he worked as a directeur sportif for Rally UHC Cycling. In 2023, he became the general manager of UCI ProTeam Lotto–Intermarché.

== Major results ==
1989
2nd Overall Tour de l'Abitibi
1991
1st Overall Tour de Normandie
2nd Grand Prix de France
1992
1st Stage 7 Paris–Nice
4th Overall Étoile de Bessèges

1st Stage 1

5th Overall Tour d'Armorique
9th Tour de Vendée
1993
5th Overall Tour de l'Avenir

1st Stage 5

10th Overall Paris–Nice
1994
1st Overall Circuit de la Sarthe

1st Stage 4a (ITT)

3rd Boucles de l'Aulne
5th Overall Tour de l'Avenir
6th Cholet-Pays de Loire
8th Overall Critérium International
9th Grand Prix d'Ouverture La Marseillaise
1995
5th Overall Paris–Nice
1996
1st Road race, National Road Championships
1st Overall French Road Cycling Cup
1st Cholet-Pays de Loire
1st Trophée des Grimpeurs
Held Stages 4–6, Tour de France
2nd Polynormande
4th Overall Critérium du Dauphiné Libéré
7th Grand Prix d'Isbergues
7th Route Adélie
8th Overall Route du Sud
9th La Flèche Wallonne
1997
3rd Klasika Primavera
4th Grand Prix de Suisse
4th Wincanton Classic
5th GP de la Ville de Rennes
7th GP Ouest-France
9th Giro di Romagna
10th Coppa Agostoni
1998
1st Polynormande
3rd GP Ouest-France
3rd Grand Prix de Wallonie
4th Road race, National Road Championships
4th Coppa Placci
7th Paris–Camembert
1999
1st Overall Tour du Limousin

1st Stage 2

3rd Polynormande
5th Overall Critérium du Dauphiné Libéré
5th Cholet-Pays de Loire
6th Overall Grand Prix du Midi Libre
6th Grand Prix de Wallonie
6th Trophée des Grimpeurs
8th Tour du Haut Var
9th Route Adélie
10th Boucles de l'Aulne
2000
3rd Overall Tour du Limousin
9th Paris–Bourges
10th Route Adélie
2001
2nd Route Adélie
3rd Overall Four Days of Dunkirk
3rd Boucles de l'Aulne
4th Trophée des Grimpeurs
7th Overall Ster Elektrotoer
9th Paris–Camembert
10th GP de la Ville de Rennes
2002
2nd Route Adélie
3rd A Travers le Morbihan
10th Cholet-Pays de Loire

=== Grand Tour general classification results timeline ===
Grand Tour	1993	1994	1995	1996	1997	1998	1999	2000	2001	2002
Giro d'Italia	DNF	65	DNF	—	—	—	—	—	—	—
Tour de France	—	—	—	DNF	20	13	14	DNF	40	—
Vuelta a España	—	—	—	—	—	—	—	—	—	DNF

Legend
—	Did not compete
DNF	Did not finish
