= Laurent Madouas =

French cyclist

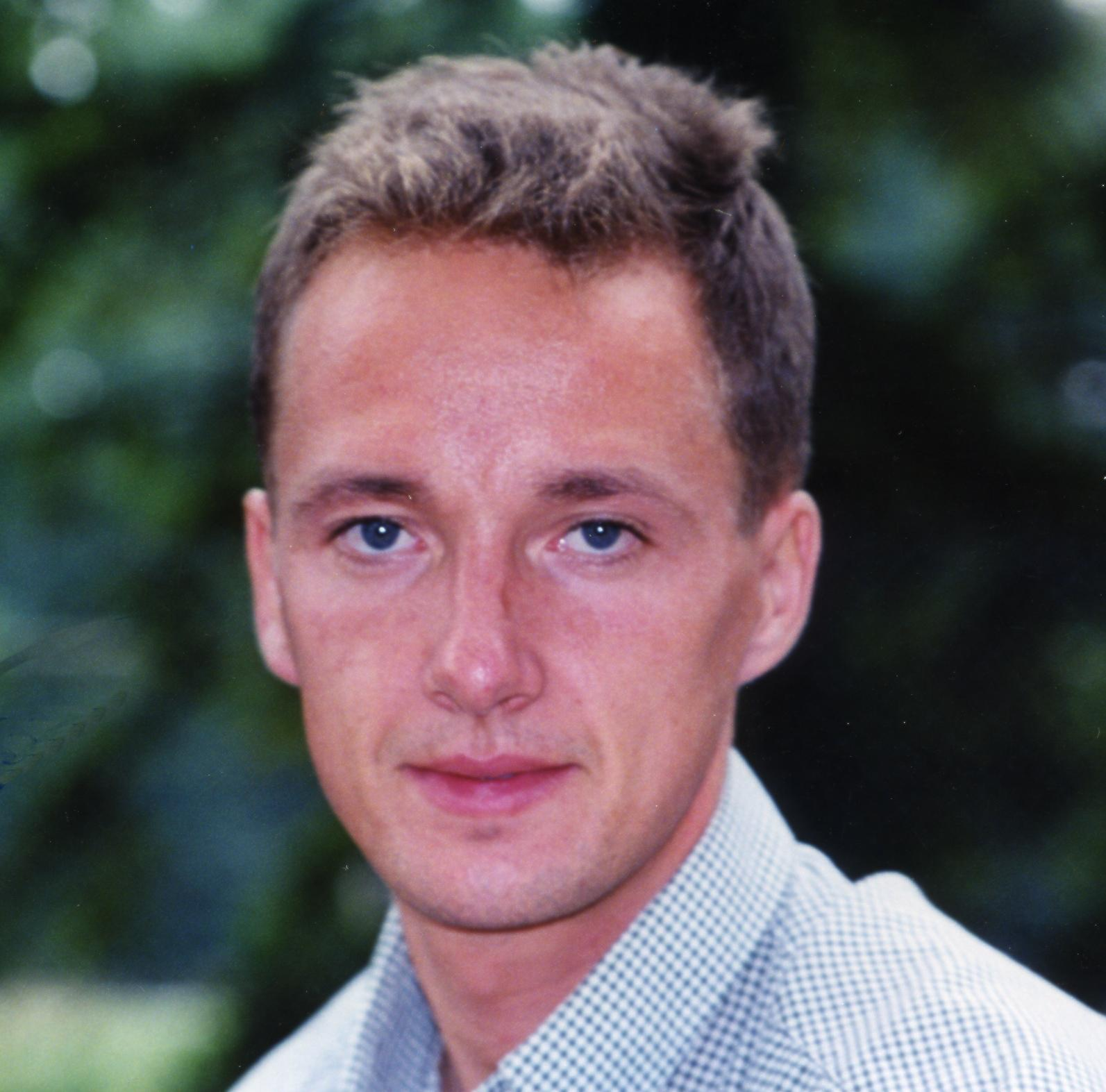

Personal information
- Born: 8 February 1967 (age 59) Rennes, France
- Height: 1.86 m (6 ft 1 in)
- Weight: 69 kg (152 lb; 10 st 12 lb)

Cycling career
- Sport: Cycling
- Discipline: Road
- Role: Rider

Professional teams
- 1989–1990: Z–Peugeot
- 1991: Toshiba
- 1992–1995: Castorama
- 1996: Motorola
- 1997–1998: Lotto–Mobistar–Isoglass
- 1999–2001: Festina–Lotus

Laurent Madouas (born 8 February 1967) is a French former road cyclist. His son Valentin is also a cyclist.

== Major results ==
1988
3rd Overall GP Tell
10th GP des Amériques
1990
8th Overall Tour de Suisse
1991
7th GP Ouest France-Plouay
7th Trophée des Grimpeurs
10th GP de la Ville de Rennes
1992
3rd Japan Cup Cycle Road Race
3rd Overall Tour Méditerranéen
1993
3rd GP de Fourmies
7th Overall Circuit Cycliste Sarthe

1st Stage 1

1994
1st Cholet-Pays de Loire
5th Trophée des Grimpeurs
1995
2nd GP Ouest France-Plouay
2nd Polynormande
3rd Road race, National Road Championships
3rd Overall Route du Sud
4th Telekom Grand Prix
7th Overall Tour DuPont
1996
1st Tour of Sweden
4th Liège–Bastogne–Liège
8th Overall Critérium du Dauphiné Libéré
9th Overall Paris–Nice
1997
2nd Classique des Alpes
2nd Grand Prix de Wallonie
4th GP Ouest France-Plouay
9th Liège–Bastogne–Liège
1998
5th Road race, National Road Championships
7th GP Ouest France-Plouay
7th Overall Route du Sud
1999
1st Stage 5 Critérium du Dauphiné Libéré
2000
8th A Travers le Morbihan

=== Grand Tour general classification results timeline ===
Grand Tour	1993	1994	1995	1996	1997	1998	1999	2000
Giro d'Italia	34	27	12	—	—	—	—	—
Tour de France	22	DNF	12	23	25	22	44	35
Vuelta a España	—	—	—	—	—	DNF	—	—

Legend
—	Did not compete
DNF	Did not finish
