= Frédéric Moncassin =

French cyclist (born 1968)

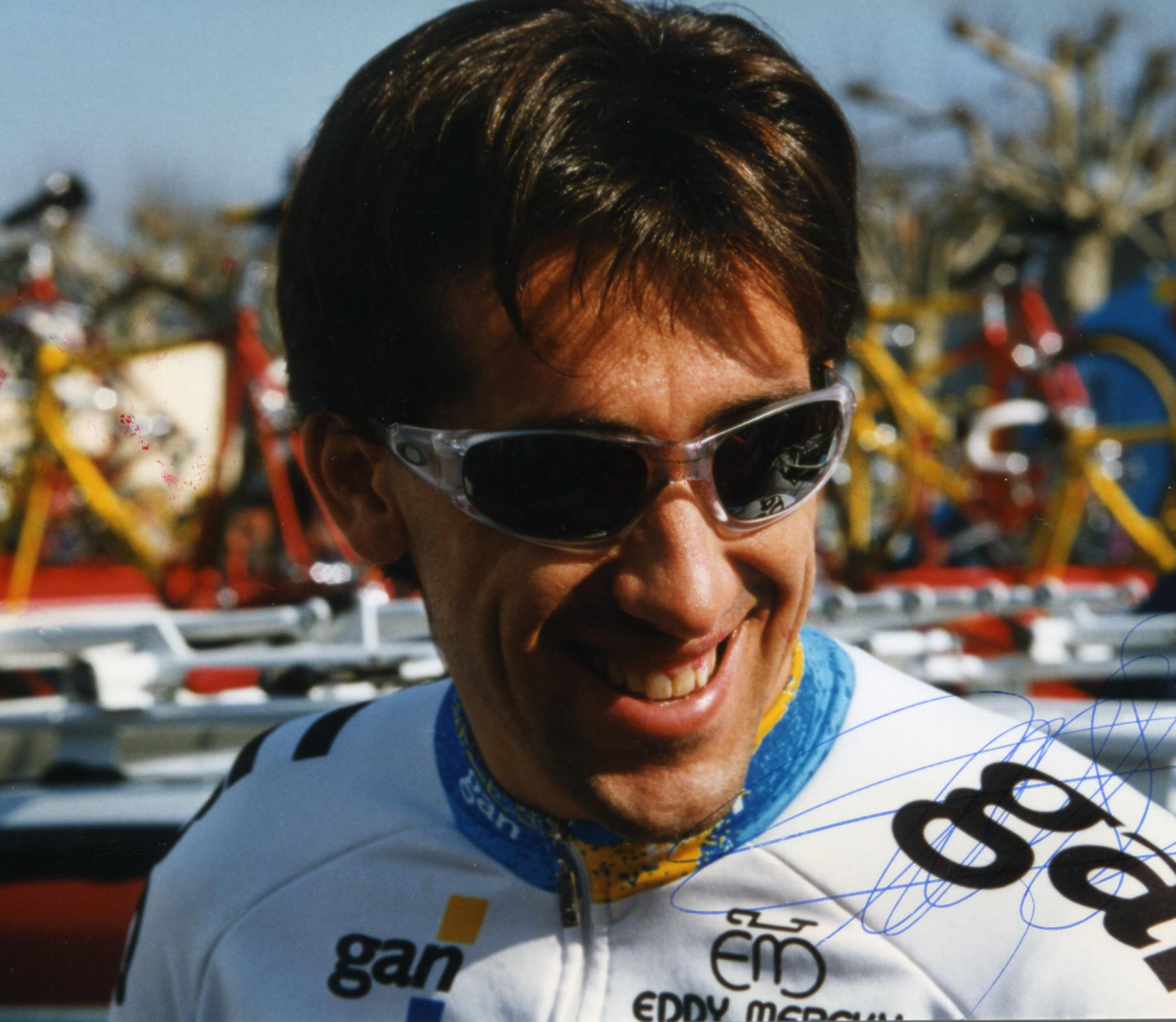

Personal information
- Nickname: Moncassecou
- Born: 26 September 1968 (age 58) Saubens, France
- Height: 1.82 m (6 ft 0 in)
- Weight: 73 kg (161 lb; 11 st 7 lb)

Cycling career
- Sport: Cycling
- Discipline: Road
- Rider type: Sprinter

Professional teams
- 1990–1992: Castorama
- 1993–1995: WordPerfect–Colnago–Decca
- 1996–1999: GAN

Major wins
- Tour de France, 2 stages; 1995 Kuurne-Brussels-Kuurne

Frédéric Moncassin (born 26 September 1968) is a French former road racing cyclist. He turned professional in 1990 and retired in 1999. He competed in the men's individual road race at the 1996 Summer Olympics.

Moncassin was a strong roadman-sprinter known for his tussles with other riders in the last metres of a race. He clashed with Tom Steels and Mario Cipollini among others. He won 30 races and led the Tour de France for a day in 1996. He also came close to winning the Tour of Flanders and Paris–Roubaix. Procycling said when he retired: "It was the 1998 Tour that, in hindsight, probably spelt the end for Fred. Under intense pressure to come up with a stage win, he struggled through the first week, only to see the race collapse around him as the Festina Scandal took hold. His unfashionable criticism of Richard Virenque - "he's an asshole and you can quote me," he told the French paper 'La Dépêche' at the time - allied to his own poor form, and his increasingly public concern that all cyclists were now tarred with the same brush, left him as a fringe character."

His name was on the list of doping tests published by the French Senate on 24 July 2013 that were collected during the 1998 Tour de France and found suspicious for EPO when retested in 2004.

== Retirement ==
Moncassin was selector for the French national road team from 2004 to 2008, when he was succeeded by Laurent Jalabert.

"I've got new shoes on today, so watch out!"

— Frédéric Moncassin

== Major results ==
1990
1st Stages 2 & 4, Critérium du Dauphiné Libéré
1st Grand Prix d'Isbergues
1st Grand Prix de Denain
1991
1st Grand Prix de Denain
1st Stage 3 Tour d'Armorique
1992
1st Grand Prix du Nord-Pas-de-Calais
1st Stage 3 Étoile de Bessèges
1st Stage 5b Tour Méditerranéen
1993
1st Overall Tour de l'Oise

1st Stages 1 & 2
1st Points classification

1st Stage 3 Critérium du Dauphiné Libéré
1st Stage 1 Tour de l'Avenir
1994
1st Stage 2 Grand Prix du Midi Libre
1995
1st Kuurne–Brussels–Kuurne
1996
1st Stages 1 & 19 Tour de France
1st Stage 1 Paris–Nice
1st Stages 1 & 3 Grand Prix du Midi Libre
1st Stages 1 & 4, Route du Sud
1997
2nd Tour of Flanders
1998
3rd Milan–San Remo
2009
1st Red Bull Road Rage, France
