= Jo Planckaert =

Belgian cyclist

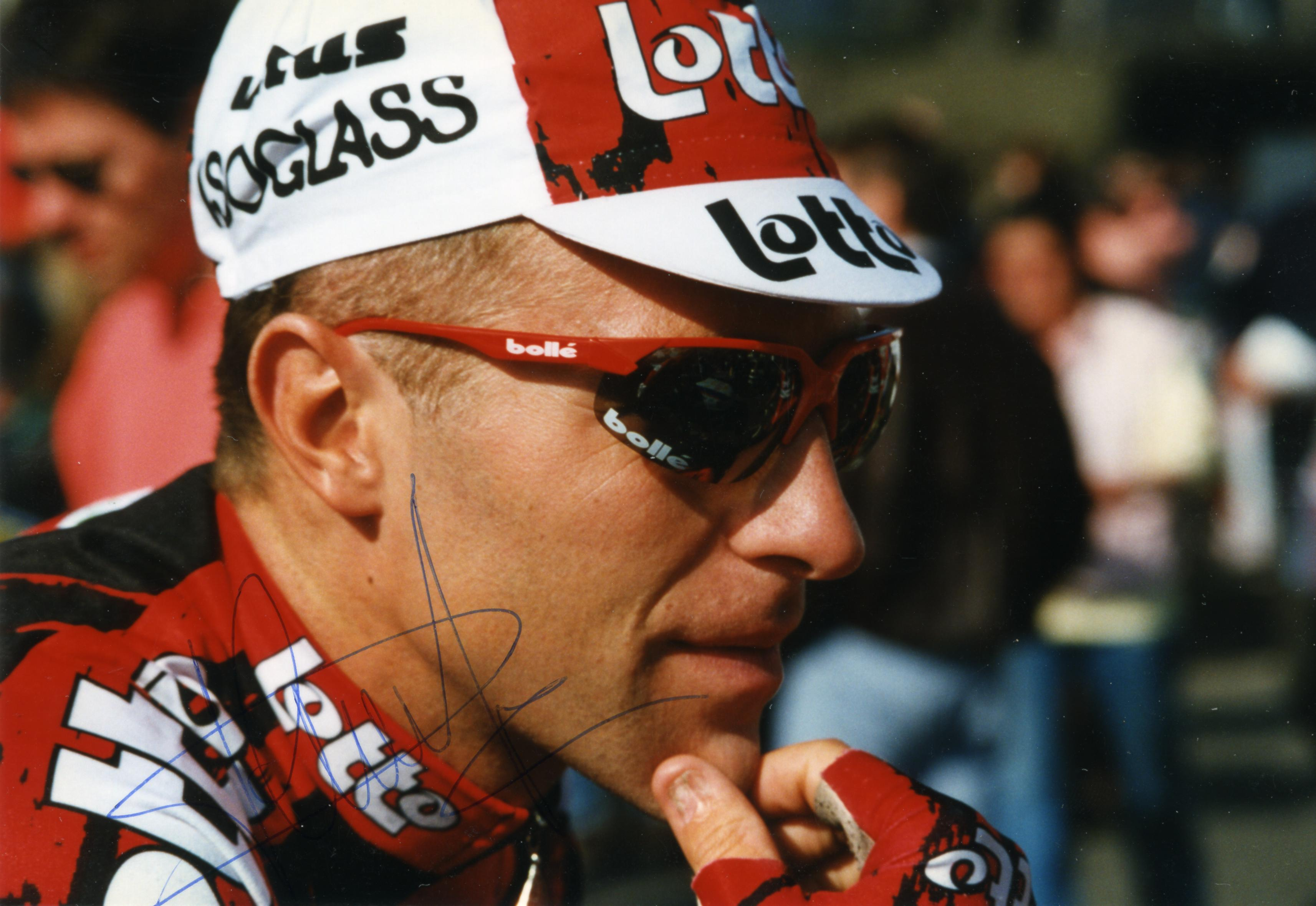

Personal information
- Full name: Jo Planckaert
- Born: 16 December 1970 (age 55) Deinze, Belgium
- Height: 1.80 m (5 ft 11 in)
- Weight: 70 kg (154 lb; 11 st 0 lb)

Cycling career
- Sport: Cycling
- Current team: Retired
- Discipline: Road
- Role: Rider

Professional teams
- 1992: Panasonic–Sportlife
- 1993: Novemail–Histor–Laser Computer
- 1994: Collstrop–Lystex
- 1995: Collstrop–Lystex
- 1996: Ceramiche Refin–Mobilvetta
- 1997–1999: Lotto–Mobistar
- 2000–2003: Cofidis
- 2004: MrBookmaker.com

Jo Planckaert (born 16 December 1970) is a Belgian former professional road bicycle racer. He is the son of former professional road bicycle racer Willy Planckaert, brother of famous road bicycle racers Eddy and Walter Planckaert.

== Major victories ==
1993
1st, Stage 3, Vuelta a Andalucía
1st, Stage 4, Vuelta a Murcia
1st, Ronde van Midden-Zeeland
1995
1st, Nokere Koerse
1st, Grand Prix de Denain
1st, Stage 4b, Tour of Sweden
2nd, Clásica de Almería
1997
2nd, Paris–Roubaix
2nd, Le Samyn
1998
1st, GP Briek Schotte
1st, Grote Prijs Jef Scherens
Étoile de Bessèges

1st, Overall and Stage 3

1999
1st, Kuurne–Brussels–Kuurne
1st, Stage 2, Étoile de Bessèges
2000
1st, Tro-Bro Léon
1st, Étoile de Bessèges
1st, Stage 5, Vuelta a Andalucía
1st, Stage 1, Tour de Wallonie
1st, Stage 1, Tour du Limousin
2001
1st, Grand Prix Zottegem
2003
1st, Stage 2, Étoile de Bessèges
2004
2nd, Grand Prix d'Ouverture La Marseillaise

== See also ==
- List of doping cases in cycling
- Francesco Planckaert
- Eddy Planckaert
- Willy Planckaert
- Walter Planckaert
