= 1991 Tour de France, Stage 12 to Stage 22 =

Cycling race stages

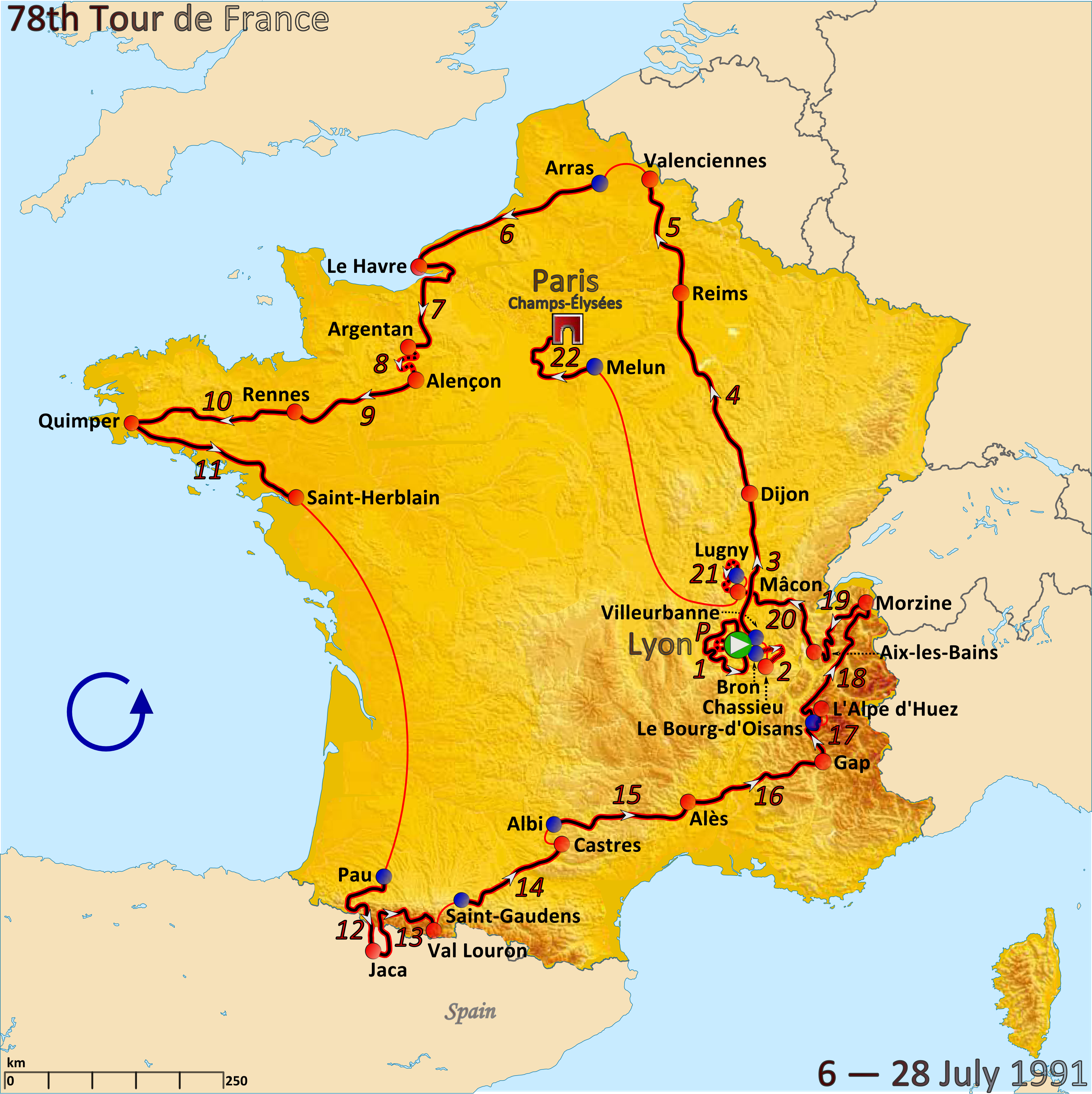
Route of the 1991 Tour de France

The 1991 Tour de France was the 78th edition of Tour de France, one of cycling's Grand Tours. The Tour began in Lyon with a prologue individual time trial on 6 July and Stage 12 occurred on 18 July with a mountainous stage from Pau. The race finished on the Champs-Élysées in Paris on 28 July.

== Stage 12 ==
18 July 1991 — Pau to Jaca (Spain), 192 km (119.3 mi)

Stage 12 result

Rank	Rider	Team	Time
1	Charly Mottet (FRA)	RMO-Mavic-Liberia	5h 15' 52"
2	Pascal Richard (SUI)	Helvetia–La Suisse	s.t.
3	Luc Leblanc (FRA)	Castorama-Raleigh	+ 2"
4	Maurizio Fondriest (ITA)	Panasonic–Sportlife	+ 2' 06"
5	Andrew Hampsten (USA)	Motorola	s.t.
6	Eduardo Chozas Olmo (ESP)	ONCE	+ 6' 21"
7	Miguel Indurain (ESP)	Banesto	+ 6' 49"
8	Frédéric Vichot (FRA)	Castorama-Raleigh	+ 6' 55"
9	Claudio Chiappucci (ITA)	Carrera Jeans–Tassoni	s.t.
10	Jan Nevens (BEL)	Lotto	s.t.

General classification after stage 12

Rank	Rider	Team	Time
1	Luc Leblanc (FRA)	Castorama-Raleigh	51h 35' 46"
2	Greg LeMond (USA)	Z	+ 2' 35"
3	Charly Mottet (FRA)	RMO-Mavic-Liberia	+ 3' 52"
4	Maurizio Fondriest (ITA)	Panasonic–Sportlife	+ 4' 22"
5	Miguel Indurain (ESP)	Banesto	+ 4' 44"
6	Pascal Richard (SUI)	Helvetia–La Suisse	+ 5' 17"
7	Jean-François Bernard (FRA)	Banesto	+ 5' 46"
8	Andrew Hampsten (USA)	Motorola	+ 6' 09"
9	Gianni Bugno (ITA)	Gatorade-Chateau d'Ax	+ 6' 26"
10	Pedro Delgado (ESP)	Banesto	+ 7' 05"

== Stage 13 ==
19 July 1991 — Jaca (Spain) to Val-Louron, 232 km (144.2 mi)

Stage 13 result

Rank	Rider	Team	Time
1	Claudio Chiappucci (ITA)	Carrera Jeans–Tassoni	7h 11' 16"
2	Miguel Indurain (ESP)	Banesto	+ 1"
3	Gianni Bugno (ITA)	Gatorade-Chateau d'Ax	+ 1' 29"
4	Laurent Fignon (FRA)	Castorama-Raleigh	+ 2' 50"
5	Charly Mottet (FRA)	RMO-Mavic-Liberia	+ 3' 53"
6	Andrew Hampsten (USA)	Motorola	+ 6' 01"
7	Eduardo Chozas Olmo (ESP)	ONCE	+ 6' 24"
8	Éric Boyer (FRA)	Z	+ 7' 17"
9	Greg LeMond (USA)	Z	+ 7' 18"
10	Jean-François Bernard (FRA)	Banesto	+ 7' 38"

General classification after stage 13

Rank	Rider	Team	Time
1	Miguel Indurain (ESP)	Banesto	58h 51' 47"
2	Charly Mottet (FRA)	RMO-Mavic-Liberia	+ 3' 00"
3	Gianni Bugno (ITA)	Gatorade-Chateau d'Ax	+ 3' 10"
4	Claudio Chiappucci (ITA)	Carrera Jeans–Tassoni	+ 4' 06"
5	Greg LeMond (USA)	Z	+ 5' 08"
6	Laurent Fignon (FRA)	Castorama-Raleigh	+ 5' 52"
7	Andrew Hampsten (USA)	Motorola	+ 7' 25"
8	Luc Leblanc (FRA)	Castorama-Raleigh	+ 7' 51"
9	Jean-François Bernard (FRA)	Banesto	+ 8' 39"
10	Eduardo Chozas Olmo (ESP)	ONCE	+ 13' 11"

== Stage 14 ==
20 July 1991 — Saint-Gaudens to Castres, 172.5 km (107.2 mi)

Stage 14 result

Rank	Rider	Team	Time
1	Bruno Cenghialta (ITA)	Ariostea	4h 15' 51"
2	Jean-Claude Colotti (FRA)	Tonton Tapis-Corona	+ 20"
3	Marco Giovannetti (ITA)	Gatorade-Chateau d'Ax	+ 21"
4	Andreas Kappes (GER)	Histor-Sigma	+ 37"
5	Davide Cassani (ITA)	Ariostea	s.t.
6	Stephen Hodge (AUS)	ONCE	s.t.
7	Luc Leblanc (FRA)	Castorama-Raleigh	s.t.
8	Djamolidine Abdoujaparov (URS)	Carrera Jeans–Tassoni	+ 56"
9	Laurent Jalabert (FRA)	Toshiba	s.t.
10	Stefano Zanatta (ITA)	Gatorade-Chateau d'Ax	s.t.

General classification after stage 14

Rank	Rider	Team	Time
1	Miguel Indurain (ESP)	Banesto	63h 09' 14"
2	Charly Mottet (FRA)	RMO-Mavic-Liberia	+ 3' 00"
3	Gianni Bugno (ITA)	Gatorade-Chateau d'Ax	+ 3' 10"
4	Claudio Chiappucci (ITA)	Carrera Jeans–Tassoni	+ 4' 06"
5	Greg LeMond (USA)	Z	+ 5' 08"
6	Laurent Fignon (FRA)	Castorama-Raleigh	+ 5' 52"
7	Luc Leblanc (FRA)	Castorama-Raleigh	+ 6' 52"
8	Andrew Hampsten (USA)	Motorola	+ 7' 25"
9	Jean-François Bernard (FRA)	Banesto	+ 8' 02"
10	Eduardo Chozas Olmo (ESP)	ONCE	+ 13' 11"

== Stage 15 ==
21 July 1991 — Albi to Alès, 235 km (146 mi)

Stage 15 result

Rank	Rider	Team	Time
1	Moreno Argentin (ITA)	Ariostea	6h 21' 22"
2	Thomas Wegmüller (SUI)	Weinmann-Eddy Merckx	+ 1' 07"
3	Mauro Ribeiro (BRA)	RMO-Mavic-Liberia	+ 1' 12"
4	Maurizio Fondriest (ITA)	Panasonic–Sportlife	+ 1' 14"
5	Frans Maassen (NED)	Buckler–Colnago–Decca	s.t.
6	Valerio Tebaldi (ITA)	Gatorade-Chateau d'Ax	s.t.
7	Rolf Gölz (GER)	Ariostea	s.t.
8	Philippe Louviot (FRA)	Toshiba	s.t.
9	Dominik Krieger (GER)	Helvetia–La Suisse	s.t.
10	Eddy Schurer (NED)	TVM–Sanyo	+ 1' 38"

General classification after stage 15

Rank	Rider	Team	Time
1	Miguel Indurain (ESP)	Banesto	69h 32' 29"
2	Charly Mottet (FRA)	RMO-Mavic-Liberia	+ 3' 00"
3	Gianni Bugno (ITA)	Gatorade-Chateau d'Ax	+ 3' 10"
4	Claudio Chiappucci (ITA)	Carrera Jeans–Tassoni	+ 4' 06"
5	Greg LeMond (USA)	Z	+ 5' 08"
6	Laurent Fignon (FRA)	Castorama-Raleigh	+ 5' 52"
7	Luc Leblanc (FRA)	Castorama-Raleigh	+ 6' 52"
8	Andrew Hampsten (USA)	Motorola	+ 7' 25"
9	Jean-François Bernard (FRA)	Banesto	+ 8' 02"
10	Eduardo Chozas Olmo (ESP)	ONCE	+ 13' 11"

== Stage 16 ==
22 July 1991 — Alès to Gap, 215 km (134 mi)

Stage 16 result

Rank	Rider	Team	Time
1	Marco Lietti (ITA)	Ariostea	6h 06' 39"
2	Greg LeMond (USA)	Z	+ 2"
3	Maurizio Fondriest (ITA)	Panasonic–Sportlife	+ 19"
4	Jean-Claude Colotti (FRA)	Tonton Tapis-Corona	+ 21"
5	Davide Cassani (ITA)	Ariostea	s.t.
6	Phil Anderson (AUS)	Motorola	s.t.
7	Frédéric Vichot (FRA)	Castorama-Raleigh	s.t.
8	Gerrit de Vries (NED)	Buckler–Colnago–Decca	s.t.
9	Eduardo Chozas Olmo (ESP)	ONCE	s.t.
10	Gérard Rué (FRA)	Helvetia–La Suisse	+ 28"

General classification after stage 16

Rank	Rider	Team	Time
1	Miguel Indurain (ESP)	Banesto	75h 39' 36"
2	Charly Mottet (FRA)	RMO-Mavic-Liberia	+ 3' 00"
3	Gianni Bugno (ITA)	Gatorade-Chateau d'Ax	+ 3' 10"
4	Claudio Chiappucci (ITA)	Carrera Jeans–Tassoni	+ 4' 06"
5	Greg LeMond (USA)	Z	+ 4' 42"
6	Laurent Fignon (FRA)	Castorama-Raleigh	+ 5' 52"
7	Luc Leblanc (FRA)	Castorama-Raleigh	+ 6' 52"
8	Andrew Hampsten (USA)	Motorola	+ 7' 25"
9	Eduardo Chozas Olmo (ESP)	ONCE	+ 13' 04"
10	Maurizio Fondriest (ITA)	Panasonic–Sportlife	+ 14' 25"

== Stage 17 ==
23 July 1991 — Gap to Alpe d'Huez, 125 km (78 mi)

Stage 17 result

Rank	Rider	Team	Time
1	Gianni Bugno (ITA)	Gatorade-Chateau d'Ax	3h 25' 48"
2	Miguel Indurain (ESP)	Banesto	+ 1"
3	Luc Leblanc (FRA)	Castorama-Raleigh	+ 2"
4	Jean-François Bernard (FRA)	Banesto	+ 35"
5	Steven Rooks (NED)	Buckler–Colnago–Decca	+ 43"
6	Claudio Chiappucci (ITA)	Carrera Jeans–Tassoni	s.t.
7	Thierry Claveyrolat (FRA)	RMO-Mavic-Liberia	s.t.
8	Pedro Delgado (ESP)	Banesto	+ 45"
9	Laurent Fignon (FRA)	Castorama-Raleigh	+ 1' 12"
10	Álvaro Mejía (COL)	Ryalco-Postobón	+ 1' 13"

General classification after stage 17

Rank	Rider	Team	Time
1	Miguel Indurain (ESP)	Banesto	79h 05' 25"
2	Gianni Bugno (ITA)	Gatorade-Chateau d'Ax	+ 3' 09"
3	Claudio Chiappucci (ITA)	Carrera Jeans–Tassoni	+ 4' 48"
4	Charly Mottet (FRA)	RMO-Mavic-Liberia	+ 4' 57"
5	Greg LeMond (USA)	Z	+ 6' 39"
6	Luc Leblanc (FRA)	Castorama-Raleigh	+ 6' 53"
7	Laurent Fignon (FRA)	Castorama-Raleigh	+ 7' 03"
8	Andrew Hampsten (USA)	Motorola	+ 9' 25"
9	Eduardo Chozas Olmo (ESP)	ONCE	+ 16' 22"
10	Gérard Rué (FRA)	Helvetia–La Suisse	+ 16' 56"

== Stage 18 ==
24 July 1991 — Le Bourg-d'Oisans to Morzine, 255 km (158 mi)

Stage 18 result

Rank	Rider	Team	Time
1	Thierry Claveyrolat (FRA)	RMO-Mavic-Liberia	7h 26' 47"
2	Thierry Bourguignon (FRA)	Toshiba	+ 6"
3	Claudio Chiappucci (ITA)	Carrera Jeans–Tassoni	+ 30"
4	Uwe Ampler (GER)	Histor-Sigma	s.t.
5	Gert-Jan Theunisse (NED)	TVM–Sanyo	s.t.
6	Éric Caritoux (FRA)	RMO-Mavic-Liberia	s.t.
7	Gianni Bugno (ITA)	Gatorade-Chateau d'Ax	s.t.
8	Steven Rooks (NED)	Buckler–Colnago–Decca	s.t.
9	Didier Virvaleix (FRA)	Histor-Sigma	s.t.
10	Gérard Rué (FRA)	Helvetia–La Suisse	s.t.

General classification after stage 18

Rank	Rider	Team	Time
1	Miguel Indurain (ESP)	Banesto	86h 32' 42"
2	Gianni Bugno (ITA)	Gatorade-Chateau d'Ax	+ 3' 09"
3	Claudio Chiappucci (ITA)	Carrera Jeans–Tassoni	+ 4' 48"
4	Charly Mottet (FRA)	RMO-Mavic-Liberia	+ 4' 57"
5	Luc Leblanc (FRA)	Castorama-Raleigh	+ 6' 53"
6	Laurent Fignon (FRA)	Castorama-Raleigh	+ 7' 15"
7	Andrew Hampsten (USA)	Motorola	+ 9' 43"
8	Greg LeMond (USA)	Z	+ 14' 01"
9	Gérard Rué (FRA)	Helvetia–La Suisse	+ 16' 56"
10	Pedro Delgado (ESP)	Banesto	+ 17' 14"

== Stage 19 ==
25 July 1991 — Morzine to Aix-les-Bains, 177 km (110 mi)

Stage 19 result

Rank	Rider	Team	Time
1	Dimitri Konyshev (URS)	TVM–Sanyo	4h 18' 28"
2	Pascal Richard (SUI)	Helvetia–La Suisse	s.t.
3	Eduardo Chozas Olmo (ESP)	ONCE	+ 11"
4	Greg LeMond (USA)	Z	+ 14"
5	Steven Rooks (NED)	Buckler–Colnago–Decca	s.t.
6	Gérard Rué (FRA)	Helvetia–La Suisse	s.t.
7	Vladimir Poulnikov (UKR)	Carrera Jeans–Tassoni	+ 34"
8	Francisco Espinosa (ESP)	Clas-Cajastur	+ 50"
9	Éric Caritoux (FRA)	RMO-Mavic-Liberia	+ 1' 03"
10	Álvaro Mejía (COL)	Ryalco-Postobón	s.t.

General classification after stage 19

Rank	Rider	Team	Time
1	Miguel Indurain (ESP)	Banesto	90h 53' 00"
2	Gianni Bugno (ITA)	Gatorade-Chateau d'Ax	+ 3' 09"
3	Claudio Chiappucci (ITA)	Carrera Jeans–Tassoni	+ 4' 48"
4	Charly Mottet (FRA)	RMO-Mavic-Liberia	+ 4' 57"
5	Luc Leblanc (FRA)	Castorama-Raleigh	+ 6' 53"
6	Laurent Fignon (FRA)	Castorama-Raleigh	+ 7' 15"
7	Andrew Hampsten (USA)	Motorola	+ 9' 43"
8	Greg LeMond (USA)	Z	+ 12' 25"
9	Gérard Rué (FRA)	Helvetia–La Suisse	+ 15' 20"
10	Eduardo Chozas Olmo (ESP)	ONCE	+ 16' 25"

== Stage 20 ==
26 July 1991 — Aix-les-Bains to Mâcon, 160 km (99 mi)

Stage 20 result

Rank	Rider	Team	Time
1	Viatcheslav Ekimov (URS)	Panasonic–Sportlife	4h 12' 52"
2	Djamolidine Abdoujaparov (URS)	Carrera Jeans–Tassoni	+ 7"
3	Olaf Ludwig (GER)	Panasonic–Sportlife	s.t.
4	Jean-Claude Colotti (FRA)	Tonton Tapis-Corona	s.t.
5	Laurent Jalabert (FRA)	Toshiba	s.t.
6	Jan Schur (GER)	Helvetia–La Suisse	s.t.
7	Davide Cassani (ITA)	Ariostea	s.t.
8	Etienne De Wilde (BEL)	Histor-Sigma	s.t.
9	Andreas Kappes (GER)	Histor-Sigma	s.t.
10	Rudy Verdonck (BEL)	Weinmann-Eddy Merckx	s.t.

General classification after stage 20

Rank	Rider	Team	Time
1	Miguel Indurain (ESP)	Banesto	95h 05' 59"
2	Gianni Bugno (ITA)	Gatorade-Chateau d'Ax	+ 3' 09"
3	Claudio Chiappucci (ITA)	Carrera Jeans–Tassoni	+ 4' 48"
4	Charly Mottet (FRA)	RMO-Mavic-Liberia	+ 4' 57"
5	Luc Leblanc (FRA)	Castorama-Raleigh	+ 6' 53"
6	Laurent Fignon (FRA)	Castorama-Raleigh	+ 7' 15"
7	Andrew Hampsten (USA)	Motorola	+ 9' 43"
8	Greg LeMond (USA)	Z	+ 12' 25"
9	Gérard Rué (FRA)	Helvetia–La Suisse	+ 15' 20"
10	Eduardo Chozas Olmo (ESP)	ONCE	+ 16' 25"

== Stage 21 ==
27 July 1991 — Lugny to Mâcon, 57 km (35 mi) (ITT)

Stage 21 result

Rank	Rider	Team	Time
1	Miguel Indurain (ESP)	Banesto	1h 11' 45"
2	Gianni Bugno (ITA)	Gatorade-Chateau d'Ax	+ 27"
3	Greg LeMond (USA)	Z	+ 48"
4	Claudio Chiappucci (ITA)	Carrera Jeans–Tassoni	+ 1' 08"
5	Viatcheslav Ekimov (URS)	Panasonic–Sportlife	+ 1' 49"
6	Jean-François Bernard (FRA)	Banesto	+ 2' 14"
7	Melcior Mauri (ESP)	ONCE	s.t.
8	Vladimir Poulnikov (UKR)	Carrera Jeans–Tassoni	+ 2' 27"
9	Vasily Zhdanov (URS)	TVM–Sanyo	+ 2' 32"
10	Charly Mottet (FRA)	RMO-Mavic-Liberia	+ 2' 40"

General classification after stage 21

Rank	Rider	Team	Time
1	Miguel Indurain (ESP)	Banesto	96h 17' 44"
2	Gianni Bugno (ITA)	Gatorade-Chateau d'Ax	+ 3' 36"
3	Claudio Chiappucci (ITA)	Carrera Jeans–Tassoni	+ 5' 56"
4	Charly Mottet (FRA)	RMO-Mavic-Liberia	+ 7' 37"
5	Luc Leblanc (FRA)	Castorama-Raleigh	+ 10' 10"
6	Laurent Fignon (FRA)	Castorama-Raleigh	+ 11' 27"
7	Greg LeMond (USA)	Z	+ 13' 13"
8	Andrew Hampsten (USA)	Motorola	+ 13' 40"
9	Pedro Delgado (ESP)	Banesto	+ 20' 10"
10	Gérard Rué (FRA)	Helvetia–La Suisse	+ 20' 13"

== Stage 22 ==
28 July 1991 — Melun to Paris Champs-Élysées, 178 km (111 mi)

Stage 22 result

Rank	Rider	Team	Time
1	Dimitri Konyshev (URS)	TVM–Sanyo	4h 43' 36"
2	Olaf Ludwig (GER)	Panasonic–Sportlife	s.t.
3	Laurent Jalabert (FRA)	Toshiba	s.t.
4	Hendrik Redant (BEL)	Lotto	s.t.
5	Phil Anderson (AUS)	Motorola	s.t.
6	Rudy Verdonck (BEL)	Weinmann-Eddy Merckx	s.t.
7	Etienne De Wilde (BEL)	Histor-Sigma	s.t.
8	Eric Vanderaerden (BEL)	Buckler–Colnago–Decca	s.t.
9	Thierry Marie (FRA)	Castorama-Raleigh	s.t.
10	Philippe Casado (FRA)	Z	s.t.

General classification after stage 22

Rank	Rider	Team	Time
1	Miguel Indurain (ESP)	Banesto	101h 01' 20"
2	Gianni Bugno (ITA)	Gatorade-Chateau d'Ax	+ 3' 36"
3	Claudio Chiappucci (ITA)	Carrera Jeans–Tassoni	+ 5' 56"
4	Charly Mottet (FRA)	RMO-Mavic-Liberia	+ 7' 37"
5	Luc Leblanc (FRA)	Castorama-Raleigh	+ 10' 10"
6	Laurent Fignon (FRA)	Castorama-Raleigh	+ 11' 27"
7	Greg LeMond (USA)	Z	+ 13' 13"
8	Andrew Hampsten (USA)	Motorola	+ 13' 40"
9	Pedro Delgado (ESP)	Banesto	+ 20' 10"
10	Gérard Rué (FRA)	Helvetia–La Suisse	+ 20' 13"
