= 1991 Tour de France, Prologue to Stage 11 =

78th Tour de France edition

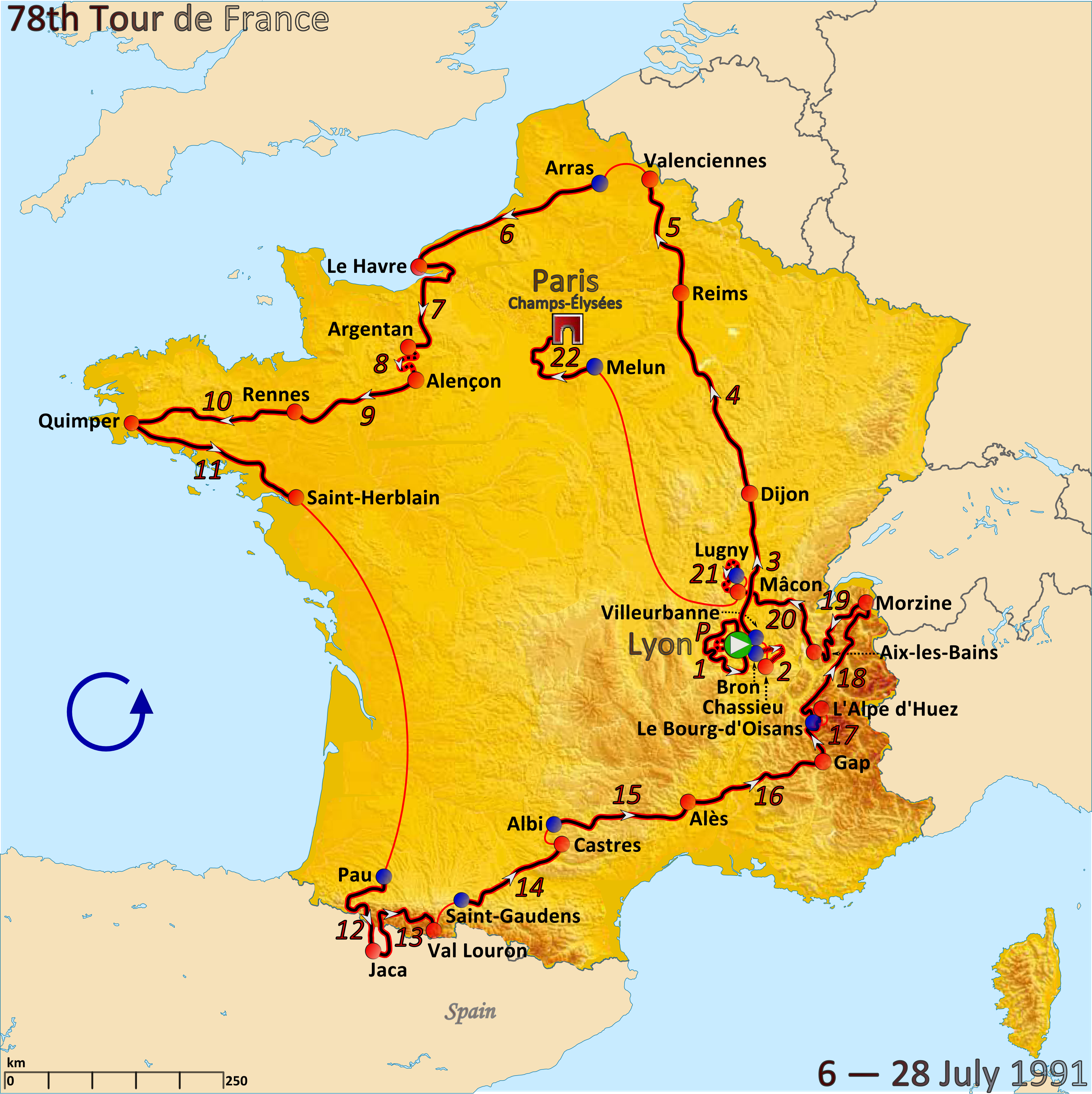
Route of the 1991 Tour de France

The 1991 Tour de France was the 78th edition of Tour de France, one of cycling's Grand Tours. The Tour began in Lyon with a prologue individual time trial on 6 July and Stage 11 occurred on 16 July with a flat stage to Saint-Herblain. The race finished on the Champs-Élysées in Paris on 28 July.

== Prologue ==
6 July 1991 — Lyon, 5.4 km (3.4 mi) (ITT)

Prologue result and general classification after prologue

Rank	Rider	Team	Time
1	Thierry Marie (FRA)	Castorama-Raleigh	6' 11"
2	Erik Breukink (NED)	PDM–Concorde–Ultima	+ 2"
3	Greg LeMond (USA)	Z	+ 3"
4	Francis Moreau (FRA)	Tonton Tapis-Corona	+ 7"
5	Melcior Mauri (ESP)	ONCE	+ 8"
6	Jelle Nijdam (NED)	Buckler–Colnago–Decca	s.t.
7	Miguel Indurain (ESP)	Banesto	+ 9"
8	Viatcheslav Ekimov (URS)	Panasonic–Sportlife	s.t.
9	Jean-François Bernard (FRA)	Banesto	+ 10"
10	Jesper Skibby (DEN)	TVM–Sanyo	s.t.

== Stage 1 ==
7 July 1991 — Lyon to Lyon, 114.5 km (71.1 mi)

Stage 1 result

Rank	Rider	Team	Time
1	Djamolidine Abdoujaparov (URS)	Carrera Jeans–Tassoni	2h 28' 54"
2	Sean Kelly (IRL)	PDM–Concorde–Ultima	s.t.
3	Greg LeMond (USA)	Z	s.t.
4	Rudy Dhaenens (BEL)	Panasonic–Sportlife	s.t.
5	Michel Vermote (BEL)	RMO-Mavic-Liberia	s.t.
6	Rolf Sørensen (DEN)	Ariostea	s.t.
7	Gilles Delion (FRA)	Helvetia–La Suisse	s.t.
8	Erik Breukink (NED)	PDM–Concorde–Ultima	s.t.
9	Rolf Järmann (SUI)	Weinmann-Eddy Merckx	+ 5"
10	Bruno Cornillet (FRA)	Z	s.t.

General classification after stage 1

Rank	Rider	Team	Time
1	Greg LeMond (USA)	Z	2h 34' 54"
2	Erik Breukink (NED)	PDM–Concorde–Ultima	+ 11"
3	Djamolidine Abdoujaparov (URS)	Carrera Jeans–Tassoni	+ 23"
4	Rolf Sørensen (DEN)	Ariostea	s.t.
5	Sean Kelly (IRL)	PDM–Concorde–Ultima	+ 25"
6			
7			
8			
9			
10			

== Stage 2 ==
7 July 1991 — Bron to Chassieu, 36.5 km (22.7 mi) (TTT)

Stage 2 result

Rank	Team	Time
1	Ariostea	41' 23"
2	Castorama-Raleigh	+ 8"
3	Panasonic–Sportlife	+ 35"
4	PDM–Concorde–Ultima	+ 40"
5	Clas-Cajastur	+ 45"
6	Buckler–Colnago–Decca	+ 49"
7	Z	s.t.
8	Motorola	+ 59"
9	Gatorade-Chateau d'Ax	s.t.
10	Banesto	+ 1' 05"

General classification after stage 2

Rank	Rider	Team	Time
1	Rolf Sørensen (DEN)	Ariostea	3h 16' 56"
2	Greg LeMond (USA)	Z	+ 10"
3	Erik Breukink (NED)	PDM–Concorde–Ultima	+ 12"
4	Sean Kelly (IRL)	PDM–Concorde–Ultima	+ 26"
5	Rudy Dhaenens (BEL)	Panasonic–Sportlife	+ 33"
6	Bruno Cornillet (FRA)	Z	+ 50"
7	Djamolidine Abdoujaparov (URS)	Carrera Jeans–Tassoni	+ 53"
8	Raúl Alcalá (MEX)	PDM–Concorde–Ultima	+ 1' 02"
9	Michel Vermote (BEL)	RMO-Mavic-Liberia	+ 1' 12"
10	Rolf Järmann (SUI)	Weinmann-Eddy Merckx	+ 1' 18"

== Stage 3 ==
8 July 1991 — Villeurbanne to Dijon, 210.5 km (130.8 mi)

Stage 3 result

Rank	Rider	Team	Time
1	Etienne De Wilde (BEL)	Histor-Sigma	5h 15' 11"
2	Jean-Paul van Poppel (NED)	PDM–Concorde–Ultima	s.t.
3	Olaf Ludwig (GER)	Panasonic–Sportlife	s.t.
4	Djamolidine Abdoujaparov (URS)	Carrera Jeans–Tassoni	s.t.
5	Johan Museeuw (BEL)	Lotto	s.t.
6	Laurent Jalabert (FRA)	Toshiba	s.t.
7	Uwe Raab (GER)	PDM–Concorde–Ultima	s.t.
8	Sean Kelly (IRL)	PDM–Concorde–Ultima	s.t.
9	Phil Anderson (AUS)	Motorola	s.t.
10	Jan Schur (GER)	Gatorade-Chateau d'Ax	s.t.

General classification after stage 3

Rank	Rider	Team	Time
1	Rolf Sørensen (DEN)	Ariostea	8h 32' 07"
2	Greg LeMond (USA)	Z	+ 10"
3	Erik Breukink (NED)	PDM–Concorde–Ultima	+ 12"
4	Sean Kelly (IRL)	PDM–Concorde–Ultima	+ 22"
5	Rudy Dhaenens (BEL)	Panasonic–Sportlife	+ 33"
6	Djamolidine Abdoujaparov (URS)	Carrera Jeans–Tassoni	+ 47"
7	Bruno Cornillet (FRA)	Z	+ 50"
8	Raúl Alcalá (MEX)	PDM–Concorde–Ultima	+ 1' 02"
9	Michel Vermote (BEL)	RMO-Mavic-Liberia	+ 1' 12"
10	Rolf Järmann (SUI)	Weinmann-Eddy Merckx	+ 1' 18"

== Stage 4 ==
9 July 1991 — Dijon to Reims, 286 km (178 mi)

Stage 4 result

Rank	Rider	Team	Time
1	Djamolidine Abdoujaparov (URS)	Carrera Jeans–Tassoni	7h 49' 14"
2	Olaf Ludwig (GER)	Panasonic–Sportlife	s.t.
3	Sean Kelly (IRL)	PDM–Concorde–Ultima	s.t.
4	Jan Schur (GER)	Gatorade-Chateau d'Ax	s.t.
5	Uwe Raab (GER)	PDM–Concorde–Ultima	s.t.
6	Johan Museeuw (BEL)	Lotto	s.t.
7	Phil Anderson (AUS)	Motorola	s.t.
8	Laurent Jalabert (FRA)	Toshiba	s.t.
9	Andreas Kappes (GER)	Histor-Sigma	s.t.
10	Remig Stumpf (GER)	Histor-Sigma	s.t.

General classification after stage 4

Rank	Rider	Team	Time
1	Rolf Sørensen (DEN)	Ariostea	16h 21' 21"
2	Greg LeMond (USA)	Z	+ 10"
3	Erik Breukink (NED)	PDM–Concorde–Ultima	+ 12"
4	Sean Kelly (IRL)	PDM–Concorde–Ultima	+ 14"
5	Djamolidine Abdoujaparov (URS)	Carrera Jeans–Tassoni	+ 23"
6	Rudy Dhaenens (BEL)	Panasonic–Sportlife	+ 33"
7	Bruno Cornillet (FRA)	Z	+ 50"
8	Raúl Alcalá (MEX)	PDM–Concorde–Ultima	+ 1' 02"
9	Michel Vermote (BEL)	RMO-Mavic-Liberia	+ 1' 12"
10	Rolf Järmann (SUI)	Weinmann-Eddy Merckx	+ 1' 18"

== Stage 5 ==
10 July 1991 — Reims to Valenciennes, 149.5 km (92.9 mi)

Stage 5 result

Rank	Rider	Team	Time
1	Jelle Nijdam (NED)	Buckler–Colnago–Decca	3h 17' 38"
2	Remig Stumpf (GER)	Histor-Sigma	+ 1"
3	Olaf Ludwig (GER)	Panasonic–Sportlife	s.t.
4	Andreas Kappes (GER)	Histor-Sigma	s.t.
5	Viatcheslav Ekimov (URS)	Panasonic–Sportlife	s.t.
6	Johan Museeuw (BEL)	Lotto	s.t.
7	Hendrik Redant (BEL)	Lotto	s.t.
8	Sean Kelly (IRL)	PDM–Concorde–Ultima	s.t.
9	Uwe Raab (GER)	PDM–Concorde–Ultima	s.t.
10	Eric Vanderaerden (BEL)	Buckler–Colnago–Decca	s.t.

General classification after stage 5

Rank	Rider	Team	Time
1	Rolf Sørensen (DEN)	Ariostea	19h 39' 08"
2	Greg LeMond (USA)	Z	+ 9"
3	Sean Kelly (IRL)	PDM–Concorde–Ultima	+ 10"
4	Erik Breukink (NED)	PDM–Concorde–Ultima	+ 16"
5	Djamolidine Abdoujaparov (URS)	Carrera Jeans–Tassoni	+ 27"
6	Rudy Dhaenens (BEL)	Panasonic–Sportlife	+ 37"
7	Bruno Cornillet (FRA)	Z	+ 49"
8	Michel Vermote (BEL)	RMO-Mavic-Liberia	+ 58"
9	Raúl Alcalá (MEX)	PDM–Concorde–Ultima	+ 1' 06"
10	Rolf Järmann (SUI)	Weinmann-Eddy Merckx	+ 1' 22"

== Stage 6 ==
11 July 1991 — Arras to Le Havre, 259 km (161 mi)

Stage 6 result

Rank	Rider	Team	Time
1	Thierry Marie (FRA)	Castorama-Raleigh	6h 38' 27"
2	Remig Stumpf (GER)	Histor-Sigma	+ 1' 54"
3	Djamolidine Abdoujaparov (URS)	Carrera Jeans–Tassoni	s.t.
4	Sean Kelly (IRL)	PDM–Concorde–Ultima	s.t.
5	Etienne De Wilde (BEL)	Histor-Sigma	s.t.
6	Laurent Jalabert (FRA)	Toshiba	s.t.
7	Johan Museeuw (BEL)	Lotto	s.t.
8	Phil Anderson (AUS)	Motorola	s.t.
9	Olaf Ludwig (GER)	Panasonic–Sportlife	s.t.
10	Jan Schur (GER)	Gatorade-Chateau d'Ax	s.t.

General classification after stage 6

Rank	Rider	Team	Time
1	Thierry Marie (FRA)	Castorama-Raleigh	26h 18' 31"
2	Sean Kelly (IRL)	PDM–Concorde–Ultima	+ 1' 04"
3	Djamolidine Abdoujaparov (URS)	Carrera Jeans–Tassoni	+ 1' 07"
4	Greg LeMond (USA)	Z	s.t.
5	Erik Breukink (NED)	PDM–Concorde–Ultima	+ 1' 14"
6	Rudy Dhaenens (BEL)	Panasonic–Sportlife	+ 1' 35"
7	Bruno Cornillet (FRA)	Z	+ 1' 47"
8	Michel Vermote (BEL)	RMO-Mavic-Liberia	+ 1' 56"
9	Raúl Alcalá (MEX)	PDM–Concorde–Ultima	+ 2' 04"
10	Olaf Ludwig (GER)	Panasonic–Sportlife	+ 2' 17"

== Stage 7 ==
12 July 1991 — Le Havre to Argentan, 167 km (104 mi)

Stage 7 result

Rank	Rider	Team	Time
1	Jean-Paul van Poppel (NED)	PDM–Concorde–Ultima	4h 02' 18"
2	Johan Museeuw (BEL)	Lotto	s.t.
3	Jan Schur (GER)	Gatorade-Chateau d'Ax	s.t.
4	Laurent Jalabert (FRA)	Toshiba	s.t.
5	Remig Stumpf (GER)	Histor-Sigma	s.t.
6	Uwe Raab (GER)	PDM–Concorde–Ultima	s.t.
7	Sean Kelly (IRL)	PDM–Concorde–Ultima	s.t.
8	Andreas Kappes (GER)	Histor-Sigma	s.t.
9	Stefano Zanatta (ITA)	Gatorade-Chateau d'Ax	s.t.
10	Steve Bauer (CAN)	Motorola	s.t.

General classification after stage 7

Rank	Rider	Team	Time
1	Thierry Marie (FRA)	Castorama-Raleigh	30h 20' 49"
2	Djamolidine Abdoujaparov (URS)	Carrera Jeans–Tassoni	+ 59"
3	Sean Kelly (IRL)	PDM–Concorde–Ultima	+ 1' 04"
4	Greg LeMond (USA)	Z	+ 1' 07"
5	Erik Breukink (NED)	PDM–Concorde–Ultima	+ 1' 14"
6	Rudy Dhaenens (BEL)	Panasonic–Sportlife	+ 1' 35"
7	Bruno Cornillet (FRA)	Z	+ 1' 47"
8	Michel Vermote (BEL)	RMO-Mavic-Liberia	+ 1' 56"
9	Raúl Alcalá (MEX)	PDM–Concorde–Ultima	+ 2' 04"
10	Olaf Ludwig (GER)	Panasonic–Sportlife	+ 2' 17"

== Stage 8 ==
13 July 1991 — Argentan to Alençon, 73 km (45 mi) (ITT)

Stage 8 result

Rank	Rider	Team	Time
1	Miguel Indurain (ESP)	Banesto	1h 35' 44"
2	Greg LeMond (USA)	Z	+ 8"
3	Jean-François Bernard (FRA)	Banesto	+ 53"
4	Erik Breukink (NED)	PDM–Concorde–Ultima	+ 1' 14"
5	Gianni Bugno (ITA)	Gatorade-Chateau d'Ax	+ 1' 31"
6	Melcior Mauri (ESP)	ONCE	+ 1' 33"
7	Djamolidine Abdoujaparov (URS)	Carrera Jeans–Tassoni	+ 1' 37"
8	Pedro Delgado (ESP)	Banesto	+ 2' 05"
9	Pascal Lance (FRA)	Toshiba	+ 2' 16"
10	Philippe Louviot (FRA)	Toshiba	+ 2' 18"

General classification after stage 8

Rank	Rider	Team	Time
1	Greg LeMond (USA)	Z	31h 57' 48"
2	Erik Breukink (NED)	PDM–Concorde–Ultima	+ 1' 13"
3	Djamolidine Abdoujaparov (URS)	Carrera Jeans–Tassoni	+ 1' 21"
4	Miguel Indurain (ESP)	Banesto	+ 2' 17"
5	Jean-François Bernard (FRA)	Banesto	+ 3' 11"
6	Sean Kelly (IRL)	PDM–Concorde–Ultima	+ 3' 51"
7	Gianni Bugno (ITA)	Gatorade-Chateau d'Ax	s.t.
8	Thierry Marie (FRA)	Castorama-Raleigh	+ 4' 10"
9	Raúl Alcalá (MEX)	PDM–Concorde–Ultima	+ 4' 14"
10	Luc Leblanc (FRA)	Castorama-Raleigh	+ 4' 20"

== Stage 9 ==
14 July 1991 — Alençon to Rennes, 161 km (100 mi)

Stage 9 result

Rank	Rider	Team	Time
1	Mauro Ribeiro (BRA)	RMO-Mavic-Liberia	3h 40' 51"
2	Laurent Jalabert (FRA)	Toshiba	s.t.
3	Dimitri Konyshev (URS)	TVM–Sanyo	s.t.
4	Giuseppe Calcaterra (ITA)	Gatorade-Chateau d'Ax	s.t.
5	Massimiliano Lelli (ITA)	Ariostea	s.t.
6	Guido Bontempi (ITA)	Carrera Jeans–Tassoni	s.t.
7	Edwig Van Hooydonck (BEL)	Buckler–Colnago–Decca	+ 2"
8	Johan Bruyneel (BEL)	Lotto	+ 4"
9	Thierry Bourguignon (FRA)	Toshiba	s.t.
10	Henri Abadie (FRA)	Toshiba	+ 18"

General classification after stage 9

Rank	Rider	Team	Time
1	Greg LeMond (USA)	Z	35h 39' 32"
2	Erik Breukink (NED)	PDM–Concorde–Ultima	+ 1' 13"
3	Djamolidine Abdoujaparov (URS)	Carrera Jeans–Tassoni	+ 1' 15"
4	Miguel Indurain (ESP)	Banesto	+ 2' 17"
5	Jean-François Bernard (FRA)	Banesto	+ 3' 11"
6	Sean Kelly (IRL)	PDM–Concorde–Ultima	+ 3' 51"
7	Gianni Bugno (ITA)	Gatorade-Chateau d'Ax	s.t.
8	Thierry Marie (FRA)	Castorama-Raleigh	+ 4' 10"
9	Raúl Alcalá (MEX)	PDM–Concorde–Ultima	+ 4' 14"
10	Luc Leblanc (FRA)	Castorama-Raleigh	+ 4' 20"

== Stage 10 ==
15 July 1991 — Rennes to Quimper, 207.5 km (128.9 mi)

Stage 10 result

Rank	Rider	Team	Time
1	Phil Anderson (AUS)	Motorola	5h 23' 23"
2	Nico Emonds (BEL)	Clas-Cajastur	s.t.
3	Brian Holm (DEN)	Histor-Sigma	s.t.
4	Michel Dernies (BEL)	Weinmann-Eddy Merckx	s.t.
5	Djamolidine Abdoujaparov (URS)	Carrera Jeans–Tassoni	+ 6"
6	Olaf Ludwig (GER)	Panasonic–Sportlife	s.t.
7	Johan Museeuw (BEL)	Lotto	s.t.
8	Laurent Jalabert (FRA)	Toshiba	+ 4"
9	Rudy Verdonck (BEL)	Weinmann-Eddy Merckx	s.t.
10	Jan Schur (GER)	Gatorade-Chateau d'Ax	s.t.

General classification after stage 10

Rank	Rider	Team	Time
1	Greg LeMond (USA)	Z	41h 03' 01"
2	Djamolidine Abdoujaparov (URS)	Carrera Jeans–Tassoni	+ 1' 09"
3	Erik Breukink (NED)	PDM–Concorde–Ultima	+ 1' 13"
4	Miguel Indurain (ESP)	Banesto	+ 2' 17"
5	Jean-François Bernard (FRA)	Banesto	+ 3' 11"
6	Sean Kelly (IRL)	PDM–Concorde–Ultima	+ 3' 51"
7	Gianni Bugno (ITA)	Gatorade-Chateau d'Ax	s.t.
8	Thierry Marie (FRA)	Castorama-Raleigh	+ 4' 10"
9	Raúl Alcalá (MEX)	PDM–Concorde–Ultima	+ 4' 14"
10	Luc Leblanc (FRA)	Castorama-Raleigh	+ 4' 20"

== Stage 11 ==
16 July 1991 — Quimper to Saint-Herblain, 246 km (153 mi)

Stage 11 result

Rank	Rider	Team	Time
1	Charly Mottet (FRA)	RMO-Mavic-Liberia	5h 12' 31"
2	Johan Museeuw (BEL)	Lotto	s.t.
3	Djamolidine Abdoujaparov (URS)	Carrera Jeans–Tassoni	s.t.
4	Laurent Jalabert (FRA)	Toshiba	s.t.
5	Olaf Ludwig (GER)	Panasonic–Sportlife	s.t.
6	Maurizio Fondriest (ITA)	Panasonic–Sportlife	s.t.
7	Etienne De Wilde (BEL)	Histor-Sigma	s.t.
8	Hendrik Redant (BEL)	Lotto	s.t.
9	Andreas Kappes (GER)	Histor-Sigma	s.t.
10	Wilfried Peeters (BEL)	Histor-Sigma	s.t.

General classification after stage 11

Rank	Rider	Team	Time
1	Greg LeMond (USA)	Z	46h 15' 32"
2	Djamolidine Abdoujaparov (URS)	Carrera Jeans–Tassoni	+ 51"
3	Miguel Indurain (ESP)	Banesto	+ 2' 17"
4	Jean-François Bernard (FRA)	Banesto	+ 3' 11"
5	Gianni Bugno (ITA)	Gatorade-Chateau d'Ax	+ 3' 51"
6	Luc Leblanc (FRA)	Castorama-Raleigh	+ 4' 20"
7	Thierry Marie (FRA)	Castorama-Raleigh	+ 4' 22"
8	Pedro Delgado (ESP)	Banesto	+ 4' 30"
9	Rolf Gölz (GER)	Ariostea	+ 4' 36"
10	Melcior Mauri (ESP)	ONCE	+ 4' 53"
