= 1991 Tour de France =

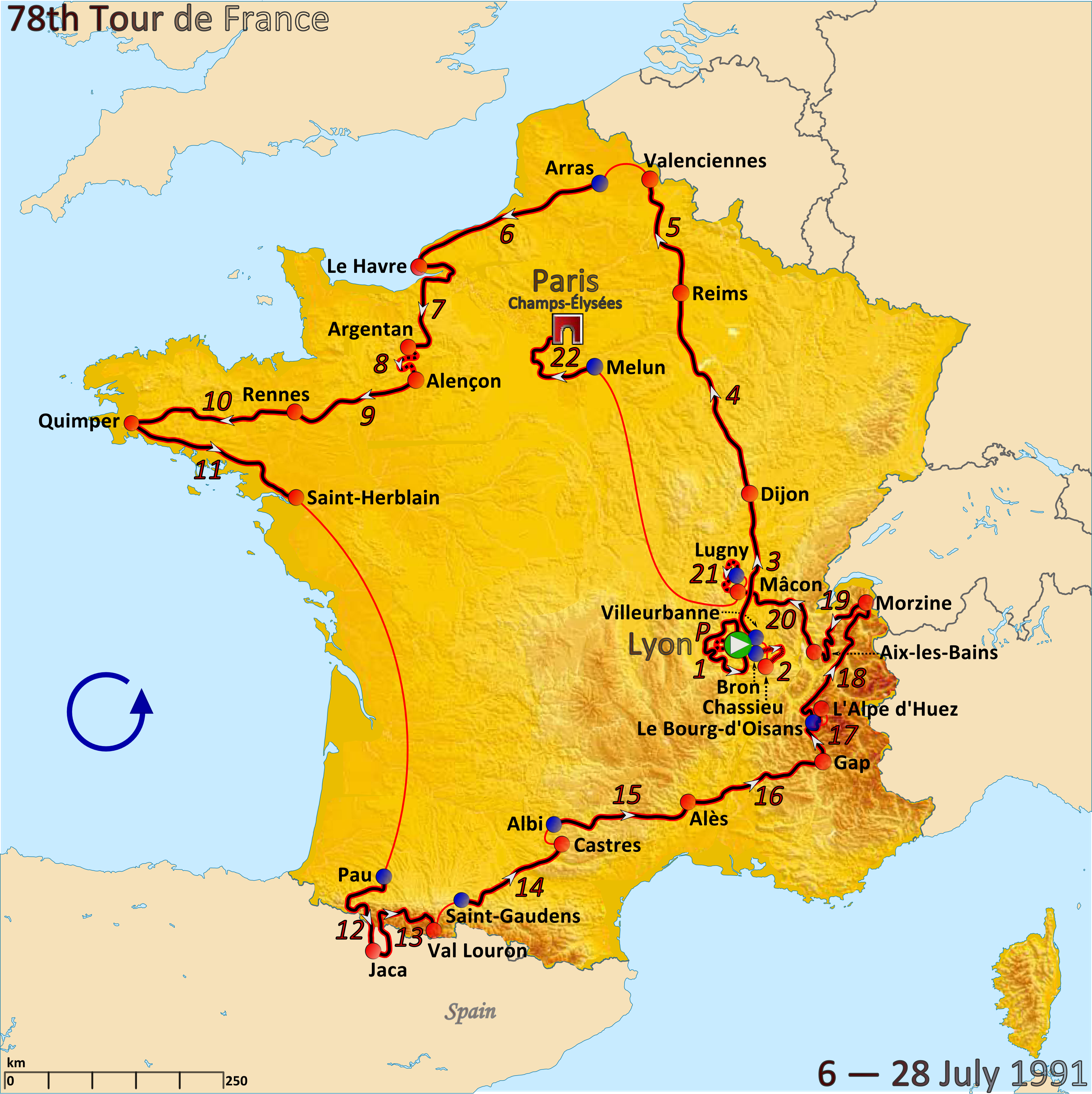
- Route of the 1991 Tour de France

Race details
- Dates: 6–28 July 1991
- Stages: 22 + Prologue
- Distance: 3,914 km (2,432 mi)
- Winning time: 101h 01' 20"

Results
Jersey awarded to the overall winner	Winner	Miguel Induráin (ESP)	(Banesto)
	Second	Gianni Bugno (ITA)	(Chateau d'Ax–Gatorade)
	Third	Claudio Chiappucci (ITA)	(Carrera Jeans–Tassoni)
Jersey awarded to the points classification winner	Points	Djamolidine Abdoujaparov (URS)	(Carrera Jeans–Tassoni)
Jersey awarded to the mountains classification winner	Mountains	Claudio Chiappucci (ITA)	(Carrera Jeans–Tassoni)
	Young rider	Álvaro Mejía (COL)	(Postobón–Manzana–Ryalcao)
	Combativity	Claudio Chiappucci (ITA)	(Carrera Jeans–Tassoni)
	Team	Banesto	

The 1991 Tour de France was the 78th edition of the Tour de France, taking place from 6 to 28 July. The total race distance was 22 stages over 3,914 km (2,432 mi). The race was won by Miguel Induráin, whose Banesto team also won the team classification. The points classification was won by Djamolidine Abdoujaparov, although he almost crashed out in the final stage. The mountains classification was won by Claudio Chiappucci, and the young rider classification by Álvaro Mejía.

== Teams ==
The 1991 Tour had a starting field of 22 teams of 9 cyclists. Sixteen teams qualified by being ranked in the top 16 of the FICP ranking for teams in May 1991. After the 1991 Giro d'Italia and the Dauphiné Libéré, the Tour organiser gave six additional wildcards.

Of the 198 cyclists starting the race, 38 were riding the Tour de France for the first time. The average age of riders in the race was 28.30 years, ranging from the 21-year-old Dimitri Zhdanov (Panasonic–Sportlife) to the 36-year-old Gilbert Duclos-Lassalle (Z). The Chateau d'Ax–Gatorade cyclists had the youngest average age while the riders on Motorola had the oldest.

The teams entering the race were:

Qualified teams

- Ariostea
- Banesto
- Buckler–Colnago–Decca
- Carrera Jeans–Tassoni
- Chateau d'Ax–Gatorade
- CLAS–Cajastur
- Helvetia–La Suisse
- Histor–Sigma
- Lotto
- Motorola
- ONCE
- PDM–Concorde–Ultima
- RMO
- Toshiba
- Weinmann–Eddy Merckx
- Z

Invited teams

- Amaya Seguros
- Castorama–Raleigh
- Panasonic–Sportlife
- Postobón–Manzana–Ryalcao
- Tonton Tapis–GB
- TVM–Sanyo

== Pre-race favourites ==
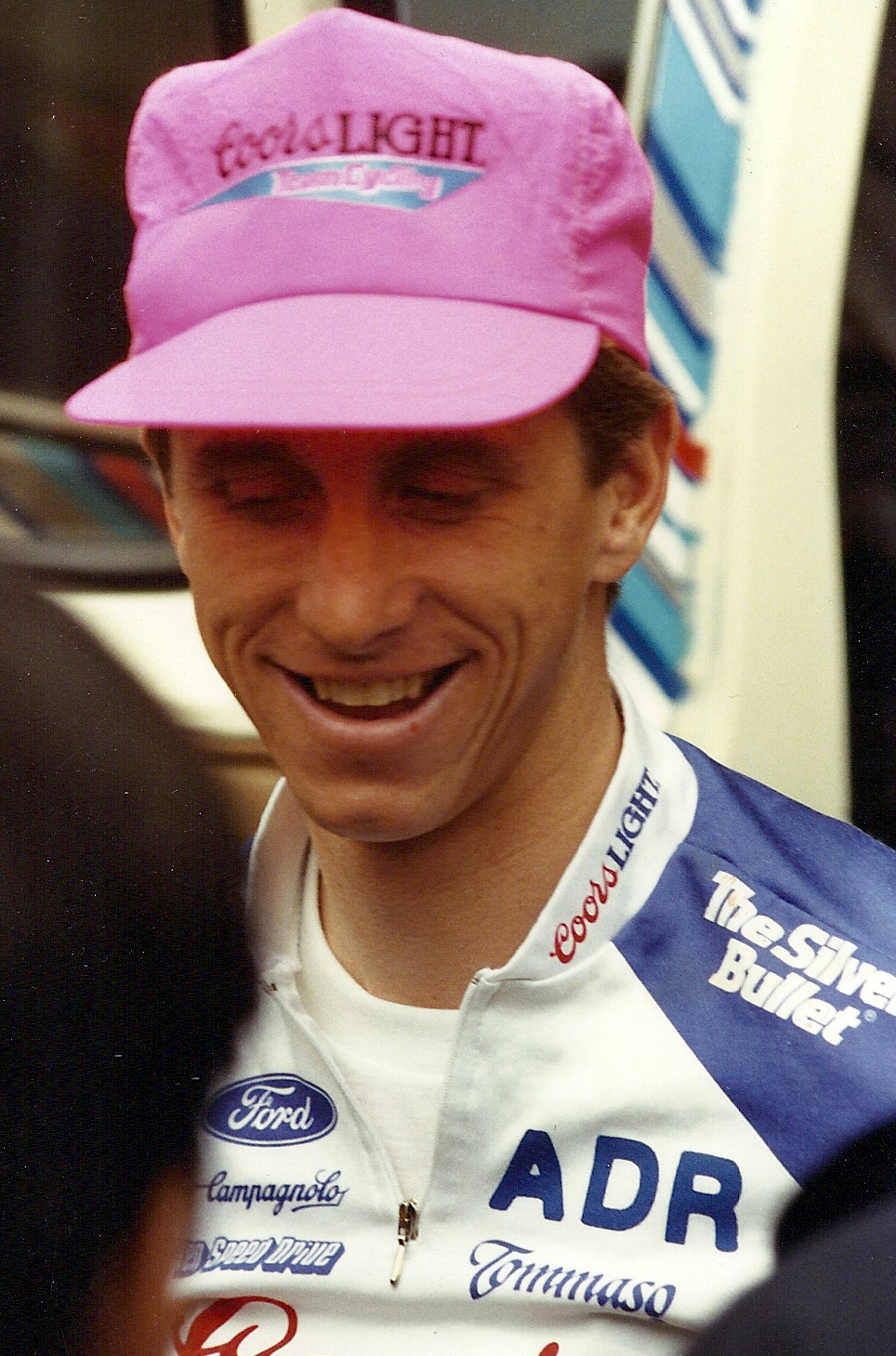
Defending champion Greg LeMond (pictured in 1989) was the bookmakers' favourite for a fourth Tour win.

Ahead of the 1991 Tour, defending champion Greg LeMond (Z) was considered the favourite to capture a fourth Tour victory, and third in a row. The Guardian's Stephen Bierley wrote that "it is excruciatingly difficult to make out a strong case for the Californian not to finish first in Paris". As had become the norm for LeMond, his early season results had been disappointing, since he chose to use those races as preparation for the Tour instead of trying to be competitive. He had dropped out of the Giro d'Italia and then finished 24th at the Tour de Suisse, one of the build-up races for the Tour de France.

Gianni Bugno (Chateau d'Ax–Gatorade) was listed by The Guardian as LeMond's "greatest threat". Winner of the 1990 Giro d'Italia, he had finished the Italian Grand Tour fourth this year. In the 1990 Tour de France, he had finished seventh overall and won two stages, including one to the ski resort of Alpe d'Huez.

The third major name to be considered a favourite was Erik Breukink (PDM–Concorde–Ultima), third overall the year before. His strong abilities in individual time trials were counted as an advantage, having won one of them in the previous year's Tour. However, his tendency to experience one day of bad form in every Tour he had competed in so far was considered to be the major weakness he had to overcome.

The previous year's runner-up, Claudio Chiappucci (Carrera Jeans–Tassoni), was also ranked among the contenders. Since his breakthrough performance in 1990, he had won the Milan–San Remo one-day race and finished second at the Giro d'Italia.

In addition to LeMond, three more former winners started the 1991 Tour: Pedro Delgado (Banesto), the winner in 1988, had finished fourth in 1990, but commentators suspected that he might be past his prime. Laurent Fignon (Castorama–Raleigh), who had won the race in 1983 and 1984, had, like LeMond, retired from the Giro d'Italia and experienced an early season without major results. However, The Guardian described him as "extremely fit and unusually relaxed". Stephen Roche (Tonton Tapis–GB), winner in 1987, had won the Critérium International earlier in the season, but having finished the Tour in 1990 only 44th, was considered to mainly compete for stage wins.

Other names listed as possible contenders for overall victory were Steve Bauer and Andrew Hampsten of Motorola, Raúl Alcalá (PDM–Concorde–Ultima), Gert-Jan Theunisse (TVM–Sanyo), Steven Rooks (Buckler–Colnago–Decca), Charly Mottet (RMO), and Jean-François Bernard (Banesto).

Bookmaker William Hill listed LeMond at 2-1 odds, followed by Bugno at 7–2, Breukink and Chiappucci at 6–1, and Delgado at 10–1.

Olaf Ludwig (Panasonic–Sportlife), who had won the points classification the year before, was again considered the favourite for it going into the 1991 Tour.

== Route and stages ==
The highest point of elevation in the race was 2,115 m (6,939 ft) at the summit of the Col du Tourmalet mountain pass on stage 13.

Stage characteristics and winners
Stage	Date	Course	Distance	Type	Winner
P	6 July	Lyon	5.4 km (3.4 mi)	Individual time trial	Thierry Marie (FRA)
1	7 July	Lyon to Lyon	114.5 km (71.1 mi)	Plain stage	Djamolidine Abdoujaparov (URS)
2	7 July	Bron to Chassieu	36.5 km (22.7 mi)	Team time trial	(Italy) Ariostea
3	8 July	Villeurbanne to Dijon	210.5 km (130.8 mi)	Plain stage	Etienne De Wilde (BEL)
4	9 July	Dijon to Reims	286.0 km (177.7 mi)	Plain stage	Djamolidine Abdoujaparov (URS)
5	10 July	Reims to Valenciennes	149.5 km (92.9 mi)	Plain stage	Jelle Nijdam (NED)
6	11 July	Arras to Le Havre	259.0 km (160.9 mi)	Plain stage	Thierry Marie (FRA)
7	12 July	Le Havre to Argentan	167.0 km (103.8 mi)	Plain stage	Jean-Paul van Poppel (NED)
8	13 July	Argentan to Alençon	73.0 km (45.4 mi)	Individual time trial	Miguel Induráin (ESP)
9	14 July	Alençon to Rennes	161.0 km (100.0 mi)	Plain stage	Mauro Ribeiro (BRA)
10	15 July	Rennes to Quimper	207.5 km (128.9 mi)	Plain stage	Phil Anderson (AUS)
11	16 July	Quimper to Saint-Herblain	246.0 km (152.9 mi)	Plain stage	Charly Mottet (FRA)
	17 July	Pau		Rest day	
12	18 July	Pau to Jaca (Spain)	192.0 km (119.3 mi)	Stage with mountain(s)	Charly Mottet (FRA)
13	19 July	Jaca (Spain) to Val-Louron	232.0 km (144.2 mi)	Stage with mountain(s)	Claudio Chiappucci (ITA)
14	20 July	St Gaudens to Castres	172.5 km (107.2 mi)	Plain stage	Bruno Cenghialta (ITA)
15	21 July	Albi to Alès	235.0 km (146.0 mi)	Hilly stage	Moreno Argentin (ITA)
16	22 July	Alès to Gap	215.0 km (133.6 mi)	Plain stage	Marco Lietti (ITA)
17	23 July	Gap to Alpe d'Huez	125.0 km (77.7 mi)	Stage with mountain(s)	Gianni Bugno (ITA)
18	24 July	Le Bourg-d'Oisans to Morzine	255.0 km (158.4 mi)	Stage with mountain(s)	Thierry Claveyrolat (FRA)
19	25 July	Morzine to Aix-les-Bains	177.0 km (110.0 mi)	Hilly stage	Dimitri Konyshev (URS)
20	26 July	Aix-les-Bains to Mâcon	160.0 km (99.4 mi)	Hilly stage	Viatcheslav Ekimov (URS)
21	27 July	Lugny to Mâcon	57.0 km (35.4 mi)	Individual time trial	Miguel Induráin (ESP)
22	28 July	Melun to Paris (Champs-Élysées)	178.0 km (110.6 mi)	Plain stage	Dimitri Konyshev (URS)
	Total		3,914 km (2,432 mi)		

== Race overview ==
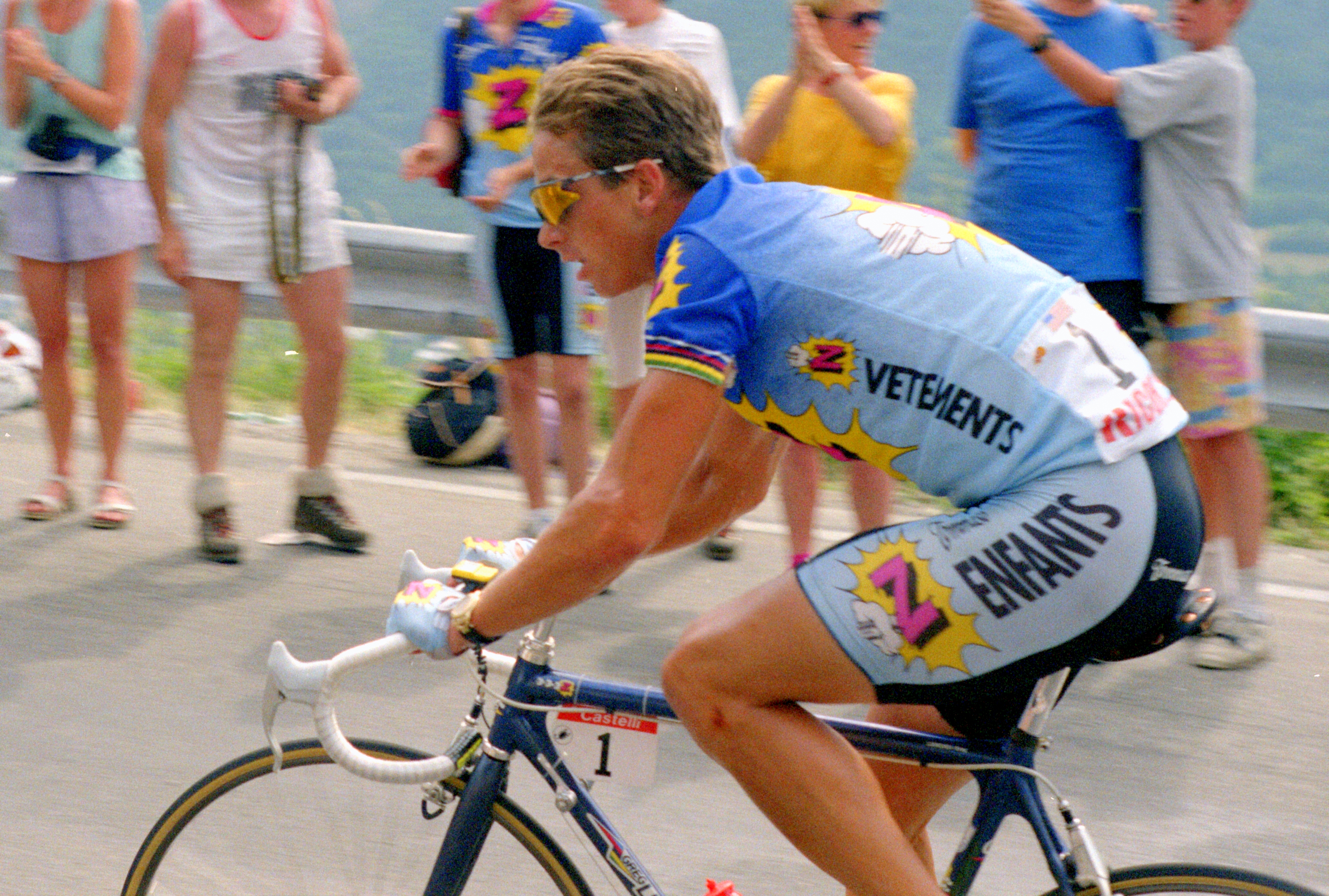
Greg LeMond during stage 17 to Alpe d'Huez

The prologue was won by specialist Thierry Marie, who also had won the prologue in the previous race. LeMond finished with the third-best time. In the first stage, a group of eleven cyclists escaped, including some cyclists aiming for the overall win: LeMond, Breukink, Rolf Sørensen and Kelly. Marie was not in this group, and thanks to time bonuses LeMond became the race leader. Later that day, the team time trial (stage 2) was run, won by Sørensen's team, and Sørensen became the new leader of the general classification.

Sørensen kept the lead for a few stages, but in the fifth stage he fell (crashing into a traffic island) and broke his clavicle. He managed to finish the stage, but was unable to start the next stage, so the sixth stage started without a yellow jersey. In that sixth stage, Thierry Marie escaped early in the stage, and reached the finish alone, with a solo of 234 kilometres (145 mi), the third-longest post-war solo escape in the Tour de France. His margin to the rest was big enough to put him back in the top position of the general classification. The time trial in stage eight was won by Miguel Induráin, with LeMond in second place, only eight seconds slower. This was enough to make LeMond the new leader, with Breukink in second place. Stage 9 saw the first Brazilian, Mauro Ribeiro, to win a stage at the Tour de France.

Before the tenth stage, two cyclists from PDM gave up. During that stage, two more gave up, and one came in late. The team revealed that the remaining four cyclists (including Breukink, Kelly and Alcalá, ranked in the top ten of the general classification) were also sick, and the next morning the entire team abandoned. There were rumours that a doping program had gone wrong, but no official penalties were given. After the eleventh stage, there was a rest day, on which the cyclists were transferred from Nantes to Pau, by airplane. Urs Zimmermann had a fear of flying, so he refused to use the airplane. The jury then disqualified him, but after the other cyclists protested, he was allowed to use other means of transportation.

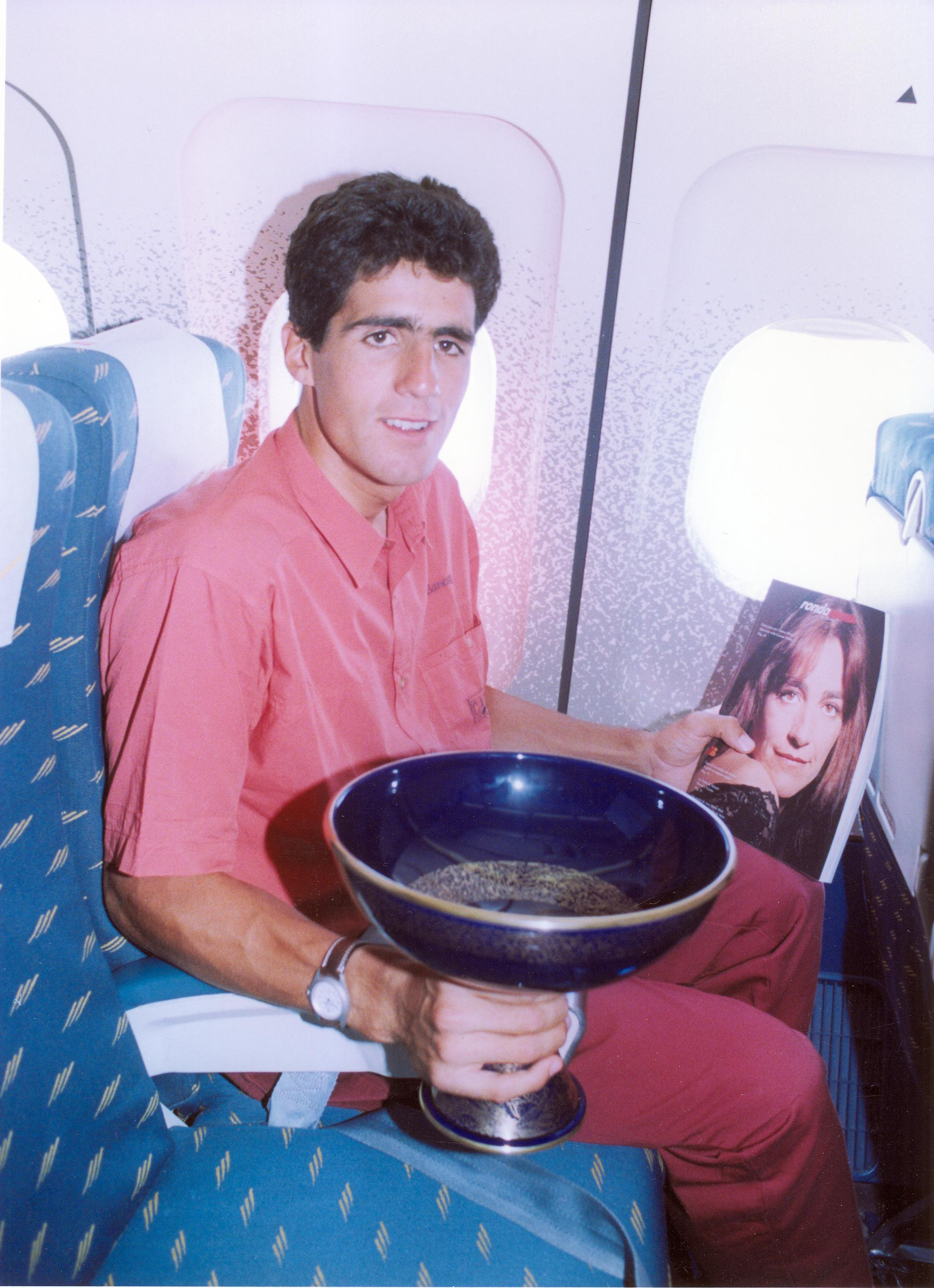
General classification winner Miguel Induráin with the trophy on a plane back to Spain.

The Tour entered the Pyrenees in the twelfth stage. A group escaped with some strong outsiders: Luc Leblanc, Charly Mottet and Pascal Richard. LeMond was unable to organise the chase, so the group stayed away until the finish. Mottet won the stage, and Leblanc became the new leader in the general classification, with LeMond now in second place.

The thirteenth stage included even more climbs than the twelfth stage. LeMond escaped on the bottom of the Tourmalet, but Indurain chased him and reached him, taking other cyclists with him. Near the top of the Tourmalet, LeMond was unable to follow, and lost contact with the others. After the top, LeMond was able to get back on the descent, but in the meantime Indurain had escaped. LeMond tried to get back to Indurain, but was unable to do so. When they reached the start of the climb of the Col d'Aspin, LeMond was within sight of Indurain, but on the climb Indurain increased the distance.

Claudio Chiappucci had escaped from the chasing group, and was getting close to Indurain. When Indurain heard this, he waited for Chiappucci; they then worked together to get away from LeMond. Chiappucci and Indurain stayed away until the finish; Chiappucci won the stage and Indurain became the new leader. LeMond finished that stage in ninth place, losing more than seven minutes.

The next three stages were relatively flat, and normally no important changes in the general classification are expected. But LeMond did everything he could to win back time, and escaped on the sixteenth stage; finishing in second place, he won back almost half a minute.

The seventeenth stage was in the Alps, with an uphill finish on l'Alpe d'Huez. Gianni Bugno won, closely followed by Indurain. LeMond lost two more minutes this stage. The eighteenth stage was the last mountainous stage, and in this stage LeMond lost almost seven minutes. Indurain was leading the race, three minutes before Gianni Bugno. Because a time trial, Indurain's specialty, was the last serious obstacle in the race, Indurain was almost sure of the victory. And indeed, Indurain won that time trial, so he won the Tour de France of 1991.

In the last stage, there was a crash on the Champs-Élysées, just before the finish, after Djamolidine Abdoujaparov, sprinting for the stage victory, hit a barrier. Abdoujaparov was leading the points classification, but had to finish the stage to win this classification. After fifteen minutes, he was able to get up and walk his bicycle across the finish line.

== Classification leadership and minor prizes ==
There were several classifications in the 1991 Tour de France. The most important was the general classification, calculated by adding each cyclist's finishing times on each stage. The cyclist with the least accumulated time was the race leader, identified by the yellow jersey; the winner of this classification is considered the winner of the Tour.

Additionally, there was a points classification, which awarded a green jersey. In the points classification, cyclists got points for finishing among the best in a stage finish, or in intermediate sprints. The cyclist with the most points lead the classification, and was identified with a green jersey.

There was also a mountains classification. The organisation had categorised some climbs as either hors catégorie, first, second, third, or fourth-category; points for this classification were won by the first cyclists that reached the top of these climbs first, with more points available for the higher-categorised climbs. The cyclist with the most points lead the classification, and wore a white jersey with red polka dots.

The fourth individual classification was the young rider classification, which was not marked by a jersey in 1991. This was decided the same way as the general classification, but only riders under 26 years were eligible.

For the team classification, the times of the best three cyclists per team on each stage were added; the leading team was the team with the lowest total time. The leaders of the team classification had previously worn yellow caps, but this was abandoned after the 1990 Tour.

In addition, there was a combativity award given after each mass-start stage to the cyclist considered most combative. The decision was made by a jury composed of journalists who gave points. The cyclist with the most points from votes in all stages led the combativity classification. Claudio Chiappucci won this classification, and was given overall the super-combativity award. The Souvenir Henri Desgrange was given in honour of Tour founder Henri Desgrange to the first rider to pass the summit of the Col du Tourmalet on stage 13. This prize was won by Chiappucci.

Classification leadership by stage
Stage	Winner	General classification	Points classification	Mountains classification	Young rider classification (Note: A white jersey was not awarded to the leader of the young rider classification between 1989 and 1999.)	Team classification	Combativity	
Stage	Winner	General classification	Points classification	Mountains classification	Young rider classification	Team classification	Award	Classification
P	Thierry Marie	Thierry Marie	Thierry Marie	not awarded	Laurent Jalabert	Castorama–Raleigh	no award	
1	Djamolidine Abdoujaparov	Greg LeMond	Greg LeMond	Rolf Järmann	Laurent Jalabert	PDM–Concorde–Ultima	Greg LeMond	Greg LeMond
2	Ariostea	Rolf Sørensen	Greg LeMond	Rolf Järmann	Massimiliano Lelli	PDM–Concorde–Ultima	no award	Greg LeMond
3	Etienne De Wilde	Rolf Sørensen	Djamolidine Abdoujaparov	Rolf Järmann	Massimiliano Lelli	PDM–Concorde–Ultima	Sammie Moreels	Greg LeMond
4	Djamolidine Abdoujaparov	Rolf Sørensen	Djamolidine Abdoujaparov	Peter De Clercq	Massimiliano Lelli	PDM–Concorde–Ultima	Benjamin Van Itterbeeck	Greg LeMond
5	Jelle Nijdam	Rolf Sørensen	Djamolidine Abdoujaparov	Peter De Clercq	Massimiliano Lelli	PDM–Concorde–Ultima	Claudio Chiappucci	Claudio Chiappucci
6	Thierry Marie	Thierry Marie	Djamolidine Abdoujaparov	Thierry Marie	Massimiliano Lelli	PDM–Concorde–Ultima	Thierry Marie	Thierry Marie
7	Jean-Paul van Poppel	Thierry Marie	Djamolidine Abdoujaparov	Peter De Clercq	Massimiliano Lelli	PDM–Concorde–Ultima	Rolf Gölz	Thierry Marie
8	Miguel Induráin	Greg LeMond	Djamolidine Abdoujaparov	Peter De Clercq	Massimiliano Lelli	PDM–Concorde–Ultima	no award	Thierry Marie
9	Mauro Ribeiro	Greg LeMond	Djamolidine Abdoujaparov	Peter De Clercq	Massimiliano Lelli	PDM–Concorde–Ultima	Henri Abadie	Thierry Marie
10	Phil Anderson	Greg LeMond	Djamolidine Abdoujaparov	Peter De Clercq	Massimiliano Lelli	PDM–Concorde–Ultima	Thierry Laurent	Thierry Marie
11	Charly Mottet	Greg LeMond	Djamolidine Abdoujaparov	Peter De Clercq	Massimiliano Lelli	Banesto	Michel Vermote	Thierry Marie
12	Charly Mottet	Luc Leblanc	Djamolidine Abdoujaparov	Pascal Richard	Miguel Ángel Martínez Torres	Castorama–Raleigh	Charly Mottet	Thierry Marie
13	Claudio Chiappucci	Miguel Induráin	Djamolidine Abdoujaparov	Claudio Chiappucci	Álvaro Mejía	Banesto	Miguel Induráin	Claudio Chiappucci
14	Bruno Cenghialta	Miguel Induráin	Djamolidine Abdoujaparov	Claudio Chiappucci	Álvaro Mejía	Banesto	Bruno Cenghialta	Claudio Chiappucci
15	Moreno Argentin	Miguel Induráin	Djamolidine Abdoujaparov	Claudio Chiappucci	Álvaro Mejía	Banesto	Moreno Argentin	Claudio Chiappucci
16	Marco Lietti	Miguel Induráin	Djamolidine Abdoujaparov	Claudio Chiappucci	Álvaro Mejía	Banesto	Laurent Fignon	Claudio Chiappucci
17	Gianni Bugno	Miguel Induráin	Djamolidine Abdoujaparov	Claudio Chiappucci	Álvaro Mejía	Banesto	Pello Ruiz Cabestany	Claudio Chiappucci
18	Thierry Claveyrolat	Miguel Induráin	Djamolidine Abdoujaparov	Claudio Chiappucci	Álvaro Mejía	Banesto	Thierry Bourguignon	Claudio Chiappucci
19	Dmitri Konychev	Miguel Induráin	Djamolidine Abdoujaparov	Claudio Chiappucci	Álvaro Mejía	Banesto	Melcior Mauri	Claudio Chiappucci
20	Viatcheslav Ekimov	Miguel Induráin	Djamolidine Abdoujaparov	Claudio Chiappucci	Álvaro Mejía	Banesto	Hendrik Redant	Claudio Chiappucci
21	Miguel Induráin	Miguel Induráin	Djamolidine Abdoujaparov	Claudio Chiappucci	Álvaro Mejía	Banesto	no award	Claudio Chiappucci
22	Dmitri Konychev	Miguel Induráin	Djamolidine Abdoujaparov	Claudio Chiappucci	Álvaro Mejía	Banesto	Greg LeMond	Claudio Chiappucci
Final		Miguel Induráin	Djamolidine Abdoujaparov	Claudio Chiappucci	Álvaro Mejía	Banesto	Claudio Chiappucci	

== Final standings ==
Legend
A yellow jersey.	Denotes the winner of the general classification	A green jersey.	Denotes the winner of the points classification
A white jersey with red polka dots.	Denotes the winner of the mountains classification		

=== General classification ===
Final general classification (1–10)
Rank	Rider	Team	Time
1	Miguel Induráin (ESP)	Banesto	101h 01' 20"
2	Gianni Bugno (ITA)	Chateau d'Ax–Gatorade	+ 3' 36"
3	Claudio Chiappucci (ITA)	Carrera Jeans–Tassoni	+ 5' 56"
4	Charly Mottet (FRA)	RMO	+ 7' 37"
5	Luc Leblanc (FRA)	Castorama–Raleigh	+ 10' 10"
6	Laurent Fignon (FRA)	Castorama–Raleigh	+ 11' 27"
7	Greg LeMond (USA)	Z	+ 13' 13"
8	Andrew Hampsten (USA)	Motorola	+ 13' 40"
9	Pedro Delgado (ESP)	Banesto	+ 20' 10"
10	Gérard Rué (FRA)	Helvetia–La Suisse	+ 20' 13"

Final general classification (11–158)
Rank	Rider	Team	Time
11	Eduardo Chozas (ESP)	ONCE	+ 21' 00"
12	Abelardo Rondon (COL)	Banesto	+ 26' 47"
13	Gert-Jan Theunisse (NED)	TVM–Sanyo	+ 27' 10"
14	Jean-François Bernard (FRA)	Banesto	+ 28' 57"
15	Maurizio Fondriest (ITA)	Panasonic–Sportlife	+ 30' 09"
16	Denis Roux (FRA)	Toshiba	+ 30' 40"
17	Éric Caritoux (FRA)	RMO	+ 32' 39"
18	Alberto Luis Camargo (COL)	Postobón–Manzana–Ryalcao	+ 32' 54"
19	Alvaro Mejia (COL)	Postobón–Manzana–Ryalcao	+ 33' 52"
20	Frédéric Vichot (FRA)	Castorama–Raleigh	+ 36' 43"
21	Gilles Delion (FRA)	Helvetia–La Suisse	+ 38' 43"
22	Javier Murguialday (ESP)	Amaya Seguros	+ 39' 11"
23	Jérôme Simon (FRA)	Z	+ 39' 14"
24	Fabrice Philipot (FRA)	Banesto	+ 41' 56"
25	Thierry Bourguignon (FRA)	Toshiba	+ 42' 32"
26	Steven Rooks (NED)	Buckler–Colnago–Decca	+ 44' 49"
27	Thierry Claveyrolat (FRA)	RMO	+ 44' 49"
28	Patrice Esnault (FRA)	Amaya Seguros	+ 46' 14"
29	Roberto Conti (ITA)	Ariostea	+ 46' 41"
30	Marco Giovannetti (ITA)	Chateau d'Ax–Gatorade	+ 47' 06"
31	Luis Herrera (COL)	Postobón–Manzana–Ryalcao	+ 47' 58"
32	Uwe Ampler (GER)	Histor–Sigma	+ 49' 11"
33	Pello Ruiz (ESP)	CLAS–Cajastur	+ 53' 21"
34	Gerrit de Vries (NED)	Buckler–Colnago–Decca	+ 54' 47"
35	Johan Bruyneel (BEL)	Lotto	+ 57' 28"
36	Jean-Claude Bagot (FRA)	Castorama–Raleigh	+ 58' 40"
37	Anselmo Fuerte (ESP)	ONCE	+ 59' 20"
38	Éric Boyer (FRA)	Z	+ 59' 51"
39	Alberto Leanizbarrutia (ESP)	CLAS–Cajastur	+ 1h 03' 09"
40	Alessandro Giannelli (ITA)	Carrera Jeans–Tassoni	+ 1h 03' 52"
41	Ronan Pensec (FRA)	Amaya Seguros	+ 1h 06' 04"
42	Viatcheslav Ekimov (URS)	Panasonic–Sportlife	+ 1h 06' 17"
43	Henry Cardenas (COL)	Postobón–Manzana–Ryalcao	+ 1h 07' 23"
44	Philippe Louviot (FRA)	Toshiba	+ 1h 07' 31"
45	Phil Anderson (AUS)	Motorola	+ 1h 08' 13"
46	Gerardo Moncada (COL)	Postobón–Manzana–Ryalcao	+ 1h 08' 45"
47	Mauro Ribeiro (BRA)	RMO	+ 1h 09' 45"
48	Óscar Vargas (COL)	Postobón–Manzana–Ryalcao	+ 1h 11' 04"
49	Pascal Richard (SUI)	Helvetia–La Suisse	+ 1h 11' 16"
50	Didier Virvaleix (FRA)	Histor–Sigma	+ 1h 12' 05"
51	Laurent Pillon (FRA)	Tonton Tapis–GB	+ 1h 12' 27"
52	Dmitri Konychev (URS)	TVM–Sanyo	+ 1h 16' 56"
53	Marino Lejarreta (ESP)	ONCE	+ 1h 18' 08"
54	Bruno Cornillet (FRA)	Z	+ 1h 18' 59"
55	Francisco Mauleón (ESP)	CLAS–Cajastur	+ 1h 20' 28"
56	Bruno Cenghialta (ITA)	Ariostea	+ 1h 20' 42"
57	Pascal Simon (FRA)	Castorama–Raleigh	+ 1h 22' 17"
58	Reynel Montoya (COL)	Postobón–Manzana–Ryalcao	+ 1h 23' 15"
59	Moreno Argentin (ITA)	Ariostea	+ 1h 23' 21"
60	Gilbert Duclos-Lassalle (FRA)	Z	+ 1h 26' 57"
61	Iñaki Gastón (ESP)	CLAS–Cajastur	+ 1h 28' 43"
62	Guy Nulens (BEL)	Panasonic–Sportlife	+ 1h 29' 10"
63	Dominik Krieger (GER)	Helvetia–La Suisse	+ 1h 29' 21"
64	Melcior Mauri (ESP)	ONCE	+ 1h 29' 25"
65	Andreas Kappes (GER)	Histor–Sigma	+ 1h 29' 38"
66	Francisco Espinosa (ESP)	CLAS–Cajastur	+ 1h 30' 55"
67	Stephen Hodge (AUS)	ONCE	+ 1h 32' 52"
68	Dominique Arnould (FRA)	Castorama–Raleigh	+ 1h 33' 20"
69	Guido Winterberg (SUI)	Helvetia–La Suisse	+ 1h 34' 35"
70	Pascal Lino (FRA)	RMO	+ 1h 34' 38"
71	Laurent Jalabert (FRA)	Toshiba	+ 1h 36' 05"
72	Robert Millar (GBR)	Z	+ 1h 36' 06"
73	Olaf Lurvik (NOR)	Toshiba	+ 1h 39' 31"
74	Jesus Montoya (ESP)	Amaya Seguros	+ 1h 41' 21"
75	Herminio Diaz (ESP)	ONCE	+ 1h 42' 13"
76	Miguel Angel Martinez (ESP)	ONCE	+ 1h 42' 14"
77	Dominique Arnaud (FRA)	Banesto	+ 1h 42' 32"
78	Marc van Orsouw (NED)	Panasonic–Sportlife	+ 1h 43' 45"
79	Rolf Gölz (GER)	Ariostea	+ 1h 43' 47"
80	Jean-Claude Colotti (FRA)	Tonton Tapis–GB	+ 1h 44' 54"
81	Marc Sergeant (BEL)	Panasonic–Sportlife	+ 1h 44' 59"
82	Patrick Jacobs (BEL)	Tonton Tapis–GB	+ 1h 45' 55"
83	Rolf Järmann (SUI)	Weinmann–Eddy Merckx	+ 1h 46' 45"
84	Eric Van Lancker (BEL)	Panasonic–Sportlife	+ 1h 47' 47"
85	Djamolidine Abdoujaparov (URS)	Carrera Jeans–Tassoni	+ 1h 49' 05"
86	Dimitri Zhdanov (URS)	Panasonic–Sportlife	+ 1h 49' 32"
87	Philippe Casado (FRA)	Z	+ 1h 49' 32"
88	Vladimir Poulnikov (URS)	Carrera Jeans–Tassoni	+ 1h 50' 50"
89	Valerio Tebaldi (ITA)	Chateau d'Ax–Gatorade	+ 1h 53' 01"
90	Frank Van Den Abeele (BEL)	Lotto	+ 1h 53' 27"
91	Alberto Elli (ITA)	Ariostea	+ 1h 55' 35"
92	Christophe Lavainne (FRA)	Castorama–Raleigh	+ 1h 56' 16"
93	Enrico Zaina (ITA)	Carrera Jeans–Tassoni	+ 1h 57' 38"
94	Peter Stevenhaagen (NED)	Helvetia–La Suisse	+ 1h 58' 03"
95	Wilfried Peeters (BEL)	Histor–Sigma	+ 1h 58' 52"
96	Guido Bontempi (ITA)	Carrera Jeans–Tassoni	+ 2h 00' 29"
97	Steve Bauer (CAN)	Motorola	+ 2h 00' 57"
98	Mauro Gianetti (SUI)	Helvetia–La Suisse	+ 2h 02' 03"
99	Pascal Lance (FRA)	Toshiba	+ 2h 03' 35"
100	Jesús Rodríguez (ESP)	Banesto	+ 2h 04' 21"
101	François Lemarchand (FRA)	Z	+ 2h 04' 30"
102	Thierry Laurent (FRA)	RMO	+ 2h 06' 07"
103	Edwig Van Hooydonck (BEL)	Buckler–Colnago–Decca	+ 2h 06' 43"
104	Arsenio Chaparro (COL)	Postobón–Manzana–Ryalcao	+ 2h 06' 48"
105	Michel Dernies (BEL)	Weinmann–Eddy Merckx	+ 2h 07' 03"
106	Roland Le Clerc (FRA)	Amaya Seguros	+ 2h 07' 26"
107	Bjarne Riis (DEN)	Castorama–Raleigh	+ 2h 08' 01"
108	Henrie Abadie (FRA)	Toshiba	+ 2h 08' 03"
109	Rudy Verdonck (BEL)	Weinmann–Eddy Merckx	+ 2h 09' 54"
110	Christian Chaubet (FRA)	Toshiba	+ 2h 11' 22"
111	Thierry Marie (FRA)	Castorama–Raleigh	+ 2h 12' 37"
112	Davide Cassani (ITA)	Ariostea	+ 2h 12' 38"
113	Werner Stutz (SUI)	Weinmann–Eddy Merckx	+ 2h 12' 48"
114	Olaf Ludwig (GER)	Panasonic–Sportlife	+ 2h 12' 54"
115	Marc Madiot (FRA)	RMO	+ 2h 13' 22"
116	Urs Zimmermann (SUI)	Motorola	+ 2h 13' 58"
117	Jelle Nijdam (NED)	Buckler–Colnago–Decca	+ 2h 15' 05"
118	Michel Vermote (BEL)	RMO	+ 2h 15' 32"
119	Luis Javier Lukin (ESP)	Banesto	+ 2h 16' 23"
120	Giancarlo Perini (ITA)	Carrera Jeans–Tassoni	+ 2h 16' 47"
121	Vassili Zhdanov (URS)	TVM–Sanyo	+ 2h 16' 52"
122	Javier Duch (ESP)	CLAS–Cajastur	+ 2h 17' 04"
123	Marino Alonso (ESP)	Banesto	+ 2h 19' 44"
124	Brian Holm (DEN)	Histor–Sigma	+ 2h 20' 16"
125	Etienne De Wilde (BEL)	Histor–Sigma	+ 2h 20' 21"
126	Andy Bishop (USA)	Motorola	+ 2h 20' 30"
127	Eric Vanderaerden (BEL)	Buckler–Colnago–Decca	+ 2h 20' 43"
128	Erich Mächler (SUI)	Carrera Jeans–Tassoni	+ 2h 21' 05"
129	Frans Maassen (NED)	Buckler–Colnago–Decca	+ 2h 21' 31"
130	Patrick Verschueren (BEL)	Lotto	+ 2h 23' 49"
131	Roberto Gusmeroli (ITA)	Chateau d'Ax–Gatorade	+ 2h 25' 30"
132	Francis Moreau (FRA)	Tonton Tapis–GB	+ 2h 26' 06"
133	Gerrit Solleveld (NED)	Buckler–Colnago–Decca	+ 2h 26' 47"
134	Jure Pavlic (YUG)	Carrera Jeans–Tassoni	+ 2h 26' 56"
135	Per Pedersen (DEN)	Amaya Seguros	+ 2h 28' 11"
136	Sergei Uslamin (URS)	TVM–Sanyo	+ 2h 29' 21"
137	Peter De Clercq (BEL)	Lotto	+ 2h 29' 26"
138	Ron Kiefel (USA)	Motorola	+ 2h 31' 24"
139	Jan Schur (GER)	Chateau d'Ax–Gatorade	+ 2h 31' 45"
140	Hendrik Redant (BEL)	Lotto	+ 2h 32' 11"
141	Stefano Zanatta (ITA)	Chateau d'Ax–Gatorade	+ 2h 32' 27"
142	Rik Van Slycke (BEL)	Lotto	+ 2h 38' 25"
143	Enrique Guerrikagoitia (ESP)	Amaya Seguros	+ 2h 39' 48"
144	Henri Manders (NED)	Helvetia–La Suisse	+ 2h 43' 34"
145	Alfred Achermann (SUI)	Weinmann–Eddy Merckx	+ 2h 44' 38"
146	Jan Siemons (NED)	TVM–Sanyo	+ 2h 44' 58"
147	Mauro Antonio Santaromita (ITA)	Chateau d'Ax–Gatorade	+ 2h 45' 04"
148	José Manuel Oliveira (ESP)	CLAS–Cajastur	+ 2h 46' 27"
149	Giuseppe Calcaterra (ITA)	Chateau d'Ax–Gatorade	+ 2h 48' 11"
150	Ludwig Willems (BEL)	Weinmann–Eddy Merckx	+ 2h 58' 10"
151	Carlos Jaramillo (COL)	Postobón–Manzana–Ryalcao	+ 2h 58' 47"
152	Eddy Schurer (NED)	TVM–Sanyo	+ 2h 58' 55"
153	Lawrence Roche (IRE)	Tonton Tapis–GB	+ 2h 59' 25"
154	Twan Poels (NED)	Buckler–Colnago–Decca	+ 3h 00' 15"
155	Thomas Wegmüller (SUI)	Weinmann–Eddy Merckx	+ 3h 00' 26"
156	Thomas Barth (GER)	TVM–Sanyo	+ 3h 05' 33"
157	Wiebren Veenstra (NED)	Buckler–Colnago–Decca	+ 3h 13' 58"
158	Rob Harmeling (NED)	TVM–Sanyo	+ 3h 25' 51"

=== Points classification ===
Final points classification (1–10)
Rank	Rider	Team	Points
1	Djamolidine Abdoujaparov (URS)	Carrera Jeans–Tassoni	316
2	Laurent Jalabert (FRA)	Toshiba	263
3	Olaf Ludwig (GER)	Panasonic–Sportlife	175
4	Jean-Claude Colotti (FRA)	Tonton Tapis–GB	159
5	Andreas Kappes (GER)	Histor–Sigma	151
6	Etienne De Wilde (BEL)	Histor–Sigma	143
7	Greg LeMond (USA)	Z	139
8	Maurizio Fondriest (ITA)	Panasonic–Sportlife	130
9	Phil Anderson (AUS)	Motorola	127
10	Dmitri Konychev (URS)	TVM–Sanyo	107

=== Mountains classification ===
Final mountains classification (1–10)
Rank	Rider	Team	Points
1	Claudio Chiappucci (ITA)	Carrera Jeans–Tassoni	312
2	Thierry Claveyrolat (FRA)	RMO	277
3	Luc Leblanc (FRA)	Castorama–Raleigh	164
4	Gianni Bugno (ITA)	Chateau d'Ax–Gatorade	157
5	Miguel Induráin (ESP)	Banesto	141
6	Andrew Hampsten (USA)	Motorola	128
7	Charly Mottet (FRA)	RMO	122
8	Pascal Richard (SUI)	Helvetia–La Suisse	118
9	Roberto Conti (ITA)	Ariostea	110
10	Peter De Clercq (BEL)	Lotto	88

=== Young rider classification ===
Final young rider classification (1–10)
Rank	Rider	Team	Time
1	Alvaro Mejia (COL)	Postobón–Manzana–Ryalcao	101h 35' 12"
2	Gerrit de Vries (NED)	Buckler–Colnago–Decca	+ 20' 55"
3	Dominik Krieger (GER)	Helvetia–La Suisse	+ 55' 29"
4	Thierry Laurent (FRA)	RMO	+ 1h 02' 13"
5	Miguel Angel Martinez (ESP)	ONCE	+ 1h 08' 22"
6	Dimitri Zhdanov (URS)	Panasonic–Sportlife	+ 1h 15' 40"
7	Enrico Zaina (ITA)	Carrera Jeans–Tassoni	+ 1h 23' 46"
8	Enrique Guerrikagoitia (ESP)	Amaya Seguros	+ 2h 05' 56"
9	José-Manuel Oliveira (ESP)	CLAS–Cajastur	+ 2h 11' 12"
10	Lawrence Roche (IRE)	Tonton Tapis–GB	+ 2h 25' 33"

=== Team classification ===
Final team classification (1–10)
Rank	Team	Time
1	Banesto	303h 28' 50"
2	Castorama–Raleigh	+ 25' 44"
3	RMO	+ 50' 25"
4	Z	+ 57' 29"
5	Postobón–Manzana–Ryalcao	+ 1h 09' 45"
6	Helvetia–La Suisse	+ 1h 11' 19"
7	ONCE	+ 1h 27' 50"
8	Amaya Seguros	+ 1h 38' 24"
9	Toshiba	+ 1h 40' 08"
10	Carrera Jeans–Tassoni	+ 1h 51' 27"

== Bibliography ==
- Augendre, Jacques (2016). Guide historique [Historical guide] (PDF) (in French). Paris: Amaury Sport Organisation. Archived (PDF) from the original on 17 August 2016.
- Cossins, Peter; Best, Isabel; Sidwells, Chris; Griffith, Clare (2013). Le Tour 100: The Definitive History of the World's Greatest Race. London: Hachette UK. ISBN 978-1-84403-759-9.
- McGann, Bill; McGann, Carol (2008). The Story of the Tour de France: 1965–2007. Vol. 2. Indianapolis: Dog Ear Publishing. ISBN 978-1-59858-608-4.
- Nauright, John; Parrish, Charles (2012). Sports Around the World: History, Culture, and Practice. Vol. 2. Santa Barbara, California: ABC-CLIO. ISBN 978-1-59884-300-2.
- van den Akker, Pieter (2018). Tour de France Rules and Statistics: 1903–2018. Self-published. ISBN 978-1-79398-080-9.
