= 1990 Ronde van Nederland =

Dutch cycling race

These are the results for the 30th edition of the Ronde van Nederland cycling race, which was held from August 13 to August 18, 1990. The race started in Groningen (Groningen (province)) and finished after 911.1 kilometres in Gulpen (Limburg).

== Final classification ==
| RANK | NAME CYCLIST | TEAM | TIME |
|---|---|---|---|
| 1. | Jelle Nijdam (NED) | Buckler–Colnago–Decca | 24:02:20 |
| 2. | Erik Breukink (NED) | PDM–Concorde–Ultima | + 0.27 |
| 3. | Thierry Marie (FRA) | Castorama | + 0.30 |
| 4. | Steven Rooks (NED) | Panasonic–Sportlife | + 0.44 |
| 5. | Søren Lilholt (DEN) | Histor–Sigma | + 0.49 |
| 6. | Uwe Raab (GDR) | PDM–Concorde–Ultima | + 0.51 |
| 7. | Eddy Schurer (NED) | TVM | + 1.02 |
| 8. | Nico Verhoeven (NED) | PDM–Concorde–Ultima | + 1.04 |
| 9. | Gérard Rué (FRA) | Castorama | + 1.05 |
| 10. | Eric Vanderaerden (BEL) | Buckler–Colnago–Decca | + 1.20 |
