= Route Adélie de Vitré =

French one-day road cycling race

Race details
- Date: Early April
- Region: Vitré, France
- Local name: Route Adélie de Vitré (in French)
- Discipline: Road race
- Competition: UCI Europe Tour
- Type: Single-day
- Web site: www.routeadelievitre.fr

History
- First edition: 1980
- Editions: 46 (as of 2026)
- First winner: Patrick Friou (FRA)
- Most wins: Jaan Kirsipuu (EST); Bryan Coquard (FRA) (2 wins)
- Most recent: Marc Brustenga (ESP)

Route Adélie de Vitré is a single-day road bicycle race held annually in April in a circuit around Vitré, France. Between 1980 and 1995 it was called Tour d'Armorique. Since 2005, the race is organized as a 1.1 event on the UCI Europe Tour. This race is named after the main partner Adélie, an ice cream brand distributed in all the Intermarché stores of France

== Winners ==
Year	Country	Rider	Team
1980	France	Patrick Friou	Miko–Mercier–Vivagel
1981	France	Bernard Vallet	La Redoute–Motobécane
1982	France	Bernard Hinault	Renault–Elf
1983	France	Jean-François Chaurin	Sem–France Loire
1984	France	Pascal Campion	La Redoute–Motobécane
1985	France	Bruno Wojtinek	Renault–Elf
1986	Switzerland	Jörg Müller	KAS
1987	France	Thierry Marie	Système U
1988	Denmark	Søren Lilholt	Sigma-Fina
1989	France	Laurent Jalabert	Toshiba
1990	Spain	Roberto Torres	Lotus–Festina
1991	France	Jérôme Simon	Z
1992	Belgium	Peter De Clercq	Lotto–Mavic–MBK
1993	France	Jean-Cyril Robin	Castorama
1994	France	Emmanuel Magnien	Castorama
1995	No race		
1996	France	Marc Bouillon	Cédico-Ville de Charleroi
1997	France	Nicolas Jalabert	Cofidis
1998	Estonia	Jaan Kirsipuu	Casino–Ag2r
1999	Germany	Torsten Schmidt	Chicky World
2000	France	Laurent Brochard	Jean Delatour
2001	Estonia	Jaan Kirsipuu	AG2R Prévoyance
2002	Sweden	Marcus Ljungqvist	EDS-Fakta
2003	France	Sébastien Joly	Jean Delatour
2004	France	Anthony Geslin	Brioches La Boulangère
2005	Italy	Daniele Contrini	LPR–Piacenza
2006	France	Samuel Dumoulin	AG2R Prévoyance
2007	France	Rémi Pauriol	Crédit Agricole
2008	Belgium	Kevyn Ista	Agritubel
2009	France	Jérôme Coppel	Française des Jeux
2010	France	Cyril Gautier	Bbox Bouygues Telecom
2011	France	Renaud Dion	Bretagne–Schuller
2012	Italy	Roberto Ferrari	Androni Giocattoli–Venezuela
2013	Italy	Alessandro Malaguti	Androni Giocattoli–Venezuela
2014	France	Bryan Coquard	Team Europcar
2015	France	Romain Feillu	Bretagne–Séché Environnement
2016	France	Bryan Coquard	Direct Énergie
2017	France	Laurent Pichon	Fortuneo–Vital Concept
2018	Switzerland	Silvan Dillier	AG2R La Mondiale
2019	France	Marc Sarreau	Groupama–FDJ
2020	No race		
2021	Netherlands	Arvid de Kleijn	Rally Cycling
2022	France	Axel Zingle	Cofidis
2023	Norway	Fredrik Dversnes	Uno-X Pro Cycling Team
2024	Belgium	Jenthe Biermans	Arkéa–B&B Hotels
2025	Norway	Stian Fredheim	Uno-X Mobility
2026	Spain	Marc Brustenga	Equipo Kern Pharma
