= Meabe =

Meabe is a surname. Notable people with the surname include:

- Aitor Albizua Meabe (born 1992), Spanish journalist
- Enrique Guerrikagoitia Meabe (born 1967), Spanish racing cyclist
- Josefina Angélica Meabe (1939–2023), Argentine politician
- Miren Agur Meabe (born 1962), Basque poet
