= 1991 GP Ouest-France =

Race details
- Dates: 20 August 1991
- Stages: 1
- Distance: 209 km (129.9 mi)
- Winning time: 5h 02' 40"

Results
	Winner	Armand de Las Cuevas (FRA)	(Banesto)
	Second	Andreas Kappes (GER)	(Histor–Sigma)
	Third	Miguel Arroyo (MEX)	(Z)

The 1991 GP Ouest-France was the 55th edition of the GP Ouest-France cycle race and was held on 20 August 1991. The race started and finished in Plouay. The race was won by Armand de Las Cuevas of the Banesto team.

== General classification ==
Final general classification

Rank	Rider	Team	Time
1	Armand de Las Cuevas (FRA)	Banesto	5h 02' 40"
2	Andreas Kappes (GER)	Histor–Sigma	+ 0"
3	Miguel Arroyo (MEX)	Z	+ 0"
4	Thomas Wegmüller (SUI)	Weinmann–Eddy Merckx	+ 4"
5	Mauro Ribeiro (BRA)	RMO	+ 17"
6	Patrick Tolhoek (NED)	Buckler–Colnago–Decca	+ 19"
7	Laurent Madouas (FRA)	Toshiba	+ 19"
8	Denis Roux (FRA)	Toshiba	+ 53"
9	Marc Madiot (FRA)	RMO	+ 53"
10	Søren Lilholt (DEN)	Histor–Sigma	+ 1' 17"
