= Miguel Arroyo =

Miguel Arroyo may refer to:

- Miguel Arroyo (cyclist) (1966–2020), Mexican cyclist
- Miguel Arroyo (gymnast) (born 1962), Cuban artistic gymnast
