= Gérard Rué =

French cyclist

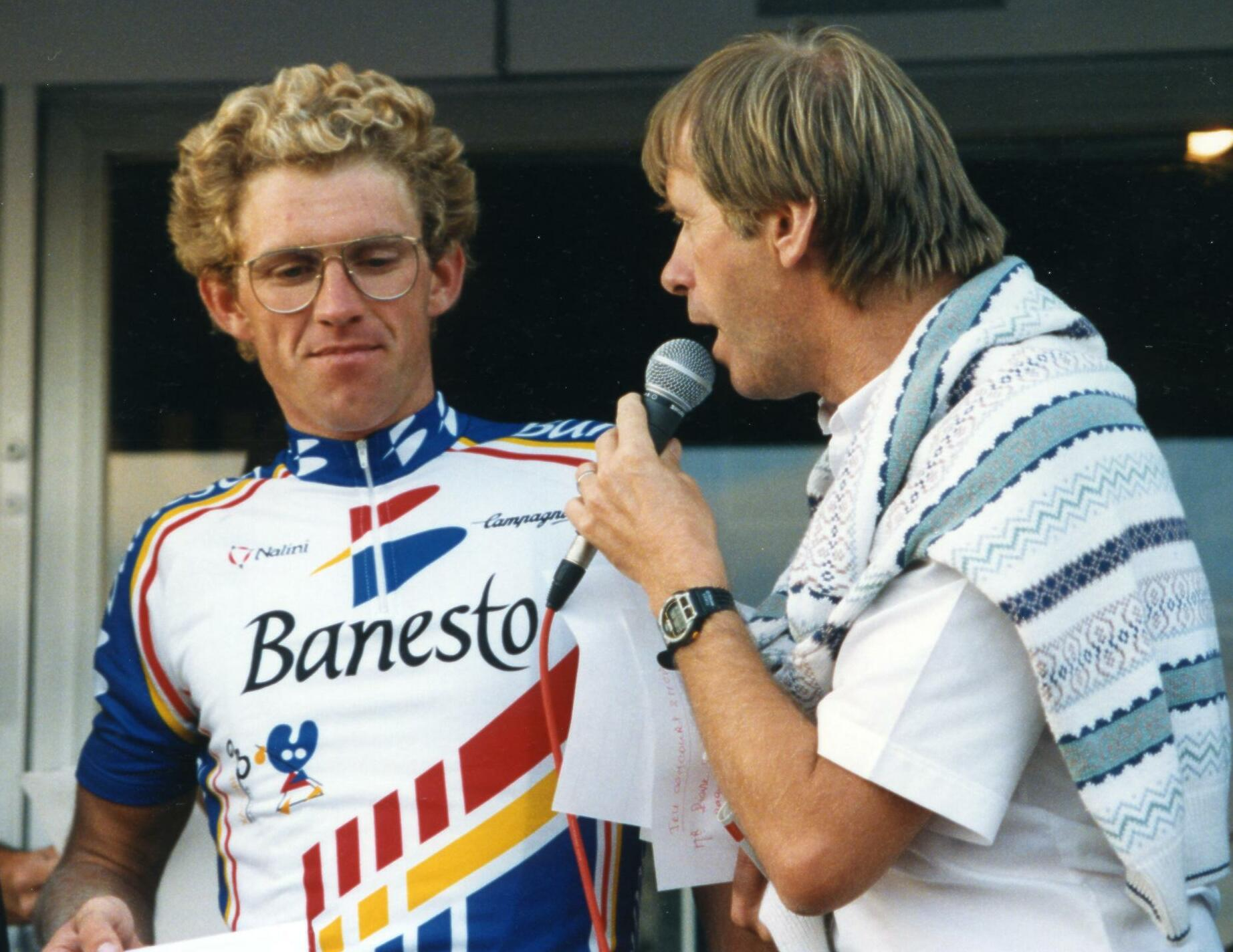

Personal information
- Born: 7 July 1965 (age 61) Romillé, France
- Height: 1.82 m (5 ft 11 1/2 in)
- Weight: 74 kg (163 lb; 11 st 9 lb)

Cycling career
- Sport: Cycling
- Current team: Retired
- Discipline: Road
- Role: Rider

Professional teams
- 1987–1989: Système U
- 1990: Castorama
- 1991: Helvetia–La Suisse
- 1992: Castorama
- 1993–1995: Banesto
- 1996–1997: GAN

Gérard Rué (born 7 July 1965 in Romillé) is a French former road cyclist. He was a professional from 1987 to 1996.

== Career ==
Rué began his professional career in 1987 with the Système U–Gitane team. In 1993, he transferred to the Banesto team to support Miguel Induráin and Pedro Delgado.

Known for being one of the most important teammates of Miguel Induráin in the Banesto team, he also won several races and some places of honor in the classics.

== Major results ==
1987
1st Duo Normand (with Thierry Marie)
1st Prologue Tour de la Communauté Européenne (TTT)
2nd Points race, National Track Championships
2nd Grand Prix d'Isbergues
6th Overall Circuit Cycliste Sarthe
1988
1st Stage 7 Grand Prix du Midi Libre
2nd Grand Prix de Plumelec-Morbihan
2nd Overall Tour de la Communauté Européenne
1989
1st Tour du Haut-Var
1st Stage 6 Critérium du Dauphiné Libéré
1st Stage 2 Tour de France (TTT)
2nd Overall Grand Prix du Midi Libre
5th Overall Paris–Nice

1st Stage 5

8th Milan–San Remo
1990
1st Overall Tour Méditerranéen
1st Overall Grand Prix du Midi Libre
1st Grand Prix de Cannes
9th Overall Tour of the Netherlands
1991
2nd Overall Critérium International
2nd La Poly Normande
3rd Road race, National Road Championships
3rd Tre Valli Varesine
3rd Trofeo Laigueglia
6th Milan–San Remo
7th Overall Tirreno–Adriatico

1st Stage 5

10th Overall Tour de France
1992
1st Tour du Haut-Var
1st Stage 5 Tour of the Netherlands
2nd La Flèche Wallonne
2nd Overall Giro di Puglia
6th Liège–Bastogne–Liège
1993
1st Boucles de l'Aulne
1st Stage 1 Vuelta a los Valles Mineros
2nd La Flèche Wallonne
2nd Bol d'Or des Monédières
8th Road race, World Road Championships
1994
8th Amstel Gold Race
1995
2nd Classique des Alpes
3rd Châteauroux Classic
7th Overall Circuit Cycliste Sarthe
1996
2nd Bordeaux–Caudéran
3rd Paris–Bourges
7th Overall Tour du Limousin
7th Overall Circuit Cycliste Sarthe
8th Route Adélie
10th Veenendaal–Veenendaal
1997
4th Route Adélie
9th Overall Étoile de Bessèges

=== Grand Tour general classification results timeline ===
Grand Tour	1987	1988	1989	1990	1991	1992	1993	1994	1995	1996	1997
Giro d'Italia	—	—	—	59	—	30	31	34	—	—	—
Tour de France	—	—	35	DNF	10	15	46	56	41	—	DSQ
Vuelta a España	DNF	—	—	—	—	—	—	—	—	—	88

Legend
—	Did not compete
DNF	Did not finish
DSQ	Disqualified
