= José Manuel Oliveira =

Spanish cyclist

Personal information
- Born: 5 May 1967 (age 59)

Cycling career
- Sport: Cycling
- Role: Rider

José Manuel Oliveira (born 5 May 1967) is a Spanish former racing cyclist. He rode in the 1991 Tour de France.
