= Thierry Marie =

French cyclist

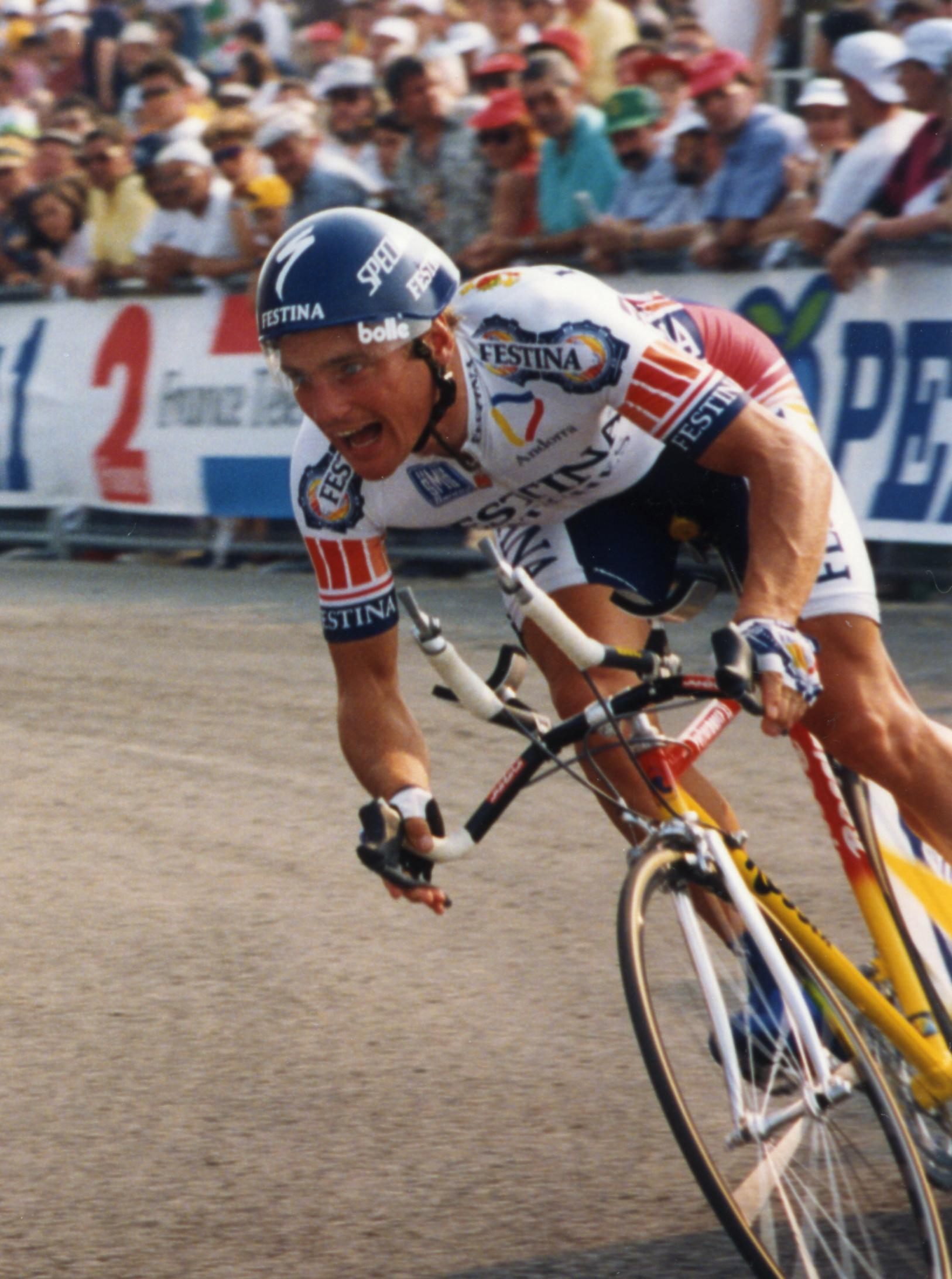
- Marie at the 1993 Tour de France

Personal information
- Full name: Thierry Marie
- Nickname: Le Viking
- Born: 25 June 1963 (age 63) Bénouville, France

Cycling career
- Sport: Cycling
- Current team: Retired
- Discipline: Road
- Role: Rider
- Rider type: Time trialist

Professional teams
- 1985: Renault–Elf
- 1986–1989: Système U
- 1990–1992: Castorama
- 1993: Festina–Lotus
- 1994–1995: Castorama
- 1996: Agrigel–La Creuse–Fenioux

Major wins
- Grand Tours Tour de France 6 individual stages (1986, 1988, 1990, 1991, 1992) 2 TTT stages (1986, 1989) Giro d'Italia 1 individual stage (1992) Vuelta a España 1 individual stage (1986) One-day races and Classics National Time Trial Championships (1995)

Thierry Marie (born 25 June 1963) is a French former cyclist. Marie often performed well in prologue stages: he won the Tour de France prologue three times in his career, and because of that he wore the yellow jersey in those three years, for seven days in total. He also competed in the team time trial event at the 1984 Summer Olympics. On stage six of the 1991 Tour de France Marie rode alone for six hours and 234 km to win the stage and set the record for the longest post-war successful breakaway.

Marie along with Greg LeMond was one of the first cyclists to experiment with aerodynamic improvements.

== Major results ==
1984
1st Paris–Roubaix Espoirs
5th Tour de Normandie
1985
1st Overall Tour du Limousin
1st Duo Normand (with Charly Mottet)
1st Stage 3 Grand Prix du Midi Libre
1st Prologue Tour de l'Avenir
2nd Grand Prix des Nations
5th GP Ouest–France
6th Overall Circuit de la Sarthe
7th Grand Prix de Rennes
9th Paris–Tours
9th Critérium des As
10th Paris–Camembert
1986
Tour de France

1st Prologue & Stage 2 (TTT)
Held after Prologue & Stages 2–3
Held after Prologue

Vuelta a España

1st Prologue
Held after Prologue

1st Stage 2b Volta a Catalunya
3rd Overall Tour de l'Aude

1st Prologue

3rd Paris–Camembert
4th Overall Three Days of De Panne
1987
1st Overall Tour d'Armorique

1st Prologue

1st Duo Normand (with Gérard Rué)
1988
1st Overall Ronde van Nederland
1st Overall Circuit de la Sarthe

1st Stage 1 (ITT)

1st Duo Normand (with Philippe Bouvatier)
1st Stage 20 Tour de France
1st Stage 2 Subida a Arrate
3rd Overall Tour d'Armorique

1st Stage 3b (ITT)

3rd Trofeo Baracchi (with Charly Mottet)
3rd Grand Prix de Denain
8th Overall Four Days of Dunkirk
1989
1st Trofeo Baracchi (with Laurent Fignon)
1st Baden-Baden (with Laurent Fignon)
1st Prologue Paris–Nice
1st Prologue Tour of Belgium
1st Stage 2 (TTT) Tour de France
2nd Overall Ronde van Nederland

1st Stage 2b (ITT)

2nd Overall Four Days of Dunkirk

1st Stages 1 & 6a (ITT)

2nd Grand Prix de Denain
2nd Grand Prix de la Libération
4th Grand Prix Eddy Merckx
9th Overall Three Days of De Panne
1990
1st Paris–Camembert
Tour de France

1st Prologue
Held & after Prologue

3rd Overall Ronde van Nederland

1st Stage 5 (ITT)

3rd Overall Four Days of Dunkirk

1st Stages 3 (ITT) & 7

3rd Overall Circuit de la Sarthe
5th Trofeo Baracchi (with Gérard Rué)
9th Grand Prix Eddy Merckx
1991
1st Polynormande
Tour de France

1st Prologue & Stage 6
Held after Prologue & Stages 6–7
Held after Prologue
Held after Stage 6

1st Stage 1 (ITT) Critérium du Dauphiné Libéré
1st Prologue Paris–Nice
1st Prologue Grand Prix du Midi Libre
1st Stage 4 (ITT) Tour d'Armorique
2nd Overall Tour de l'Oise

1st Stage 4 (ITT)

2nd Chrono des Herbiers
3rd Tour de Vendée
4th Overall Ronde van Nederland
5th Overall Circuit de la Sarthe
1992
1st Overall Tour de l'Oise

1st Stage 4 (ITT)

Giro d'Italia

1st Prologue
Held after Prologue & Stage 1
Held after Prologue

1st Stage 18 Tour de France
2nd Road race, National Road Championships
2nd Overall Ronde van Nederland
3rd Overall Three Days of De Panne

1st Stage 1b (ITT)

3rd Circuit de l'Aulne
3rd Grand Prix Eddy Merckx
7th Trofeo Pantalica
8th Chrono des Herbiers
1993
1st Overall Tour du Poitou Charentes et de la Vienne

1st Stage 5 (ITT)

1st Stage 4 Vuelta a Burgos
3rd Telekom Grand Prix (with Pascal Lino)
9th Grand Prix de Denain
1994
2nd Chrono des Herbiers
3rd Grand Prix des Nations
4th Overall Four Days of Dunkirk
5th Grand Prix Eddy Merckx
6th Overall Three Days of De Panne
6th Overall Tour de l'Oise
6th Telekom Grand Prix (with Thomas Davy
7th Time trial, UCI Road World Championships
1995
1st Time trial, National Road Championships
1st Overall Circuit de la Sarthe

1st Stage 2

1st La Côte Picarde
1st Châteauroux Classic
1st Stage 1b (ITT) Route du Sud
4th Overall Tour de l'Oise
4th Telekom Grand Prix (with Laurent Madouas)
5th Paris–Camembert
7th Cholet-Pays de la Loire
1996
2nd Route Adélie
7th Tour de Vendée

=== Grand Tour general classification results timeline ===
Grand Tour	1985	1986	1987	1988	1989	1990	1991	1992	1993	1994	1995	1996
Vuelta a España	—	DNF	—	—	—	—	—	—	109	—	—	—
Giro d'Italia	—	—	—	—	116	119	—	127	—	DNF	—	—
Tour de France	67	108	87	98	72	121	111	114	DNF	53	94	DNF

Legend
—	Did not compete
DNF	Did not finish
