= Didier Virvaleix =

French cyclist

Personal information
- Born: 21 September 1966 (age 60)

Cycling career
- Sport: Cycling
- Role: Rider

Didier Virvaleix (born 21 September 1966) is a French racing cyclist. He rode in the 1991 Tour de France.
