= Enrique Guerrikagoitia =

Spanish cyclist

Personal information
- Born: 3 June 1967 (age 59)

Cycling career
- Sport: Cycling
- Role: Rider

Enrique Guerrikagoitia Meabe (born 3 June 1967) is a Spanish racing cyclist. He rode in the 1991 Tour de France.
