= Gerrit de Vries (cyclist) =

Dutch racing cyclist

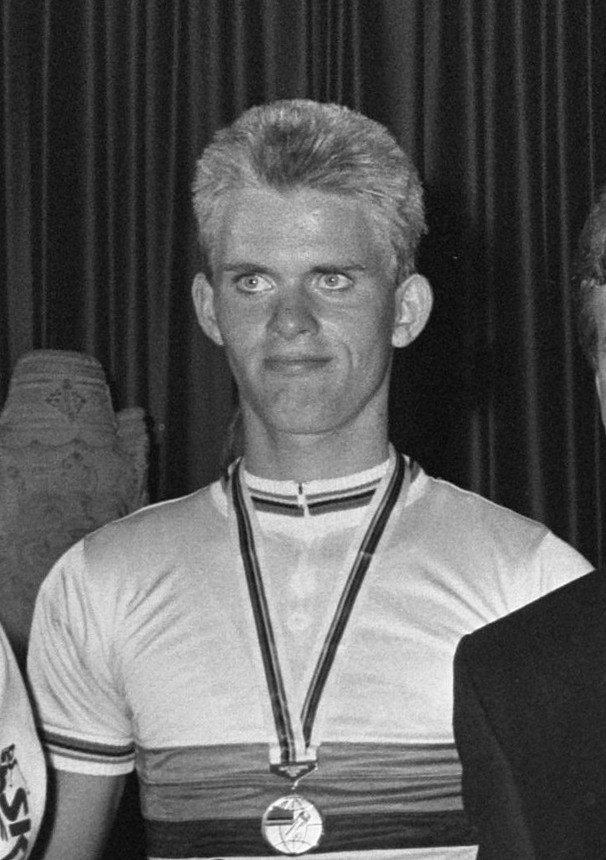
- Gerrit de Vries in 1986

Personal information
- Born: 30 May 1966 (age 60) Oldeberkoop, the Netherlands
- Height: 1.86 m (6 ft 1 in)
- Weight: 75 kg (165 lb; 11 st 11 lb)

Sport
- Sport: Cycling
Medal record
Representing the Netherlands
UCI Road World Championships
Gold medal – first place	1986 Colorado Springs	Team time trial

Gerrit de Vries (born 13 May 1967) is a retired road racing cyclist from the Netherlands, who was a professional from 1989 to 1997. As an amateur he won the world title in the 100 km team time trial, alongside Rob Harmeling, Tom Cordes and John Talen in 1986. His team finished in 11th place in this event at the 1988 Summer Olympics. De Vries rode in six editions of the Tour de France.

== Tour de France results ==
- 1990 – 67th
- 1991 – 34th
- 1993 – 55th
- 1994 – 77th
- 1996 – 119th
- 1997 – 125th

== See also ==
- List of Dutch Olympic cyclists
