= Miguel Arroyo (cyclist) =

Mexican cyclist (1966–2020)

Fernando Miguel Arroyo Rosales
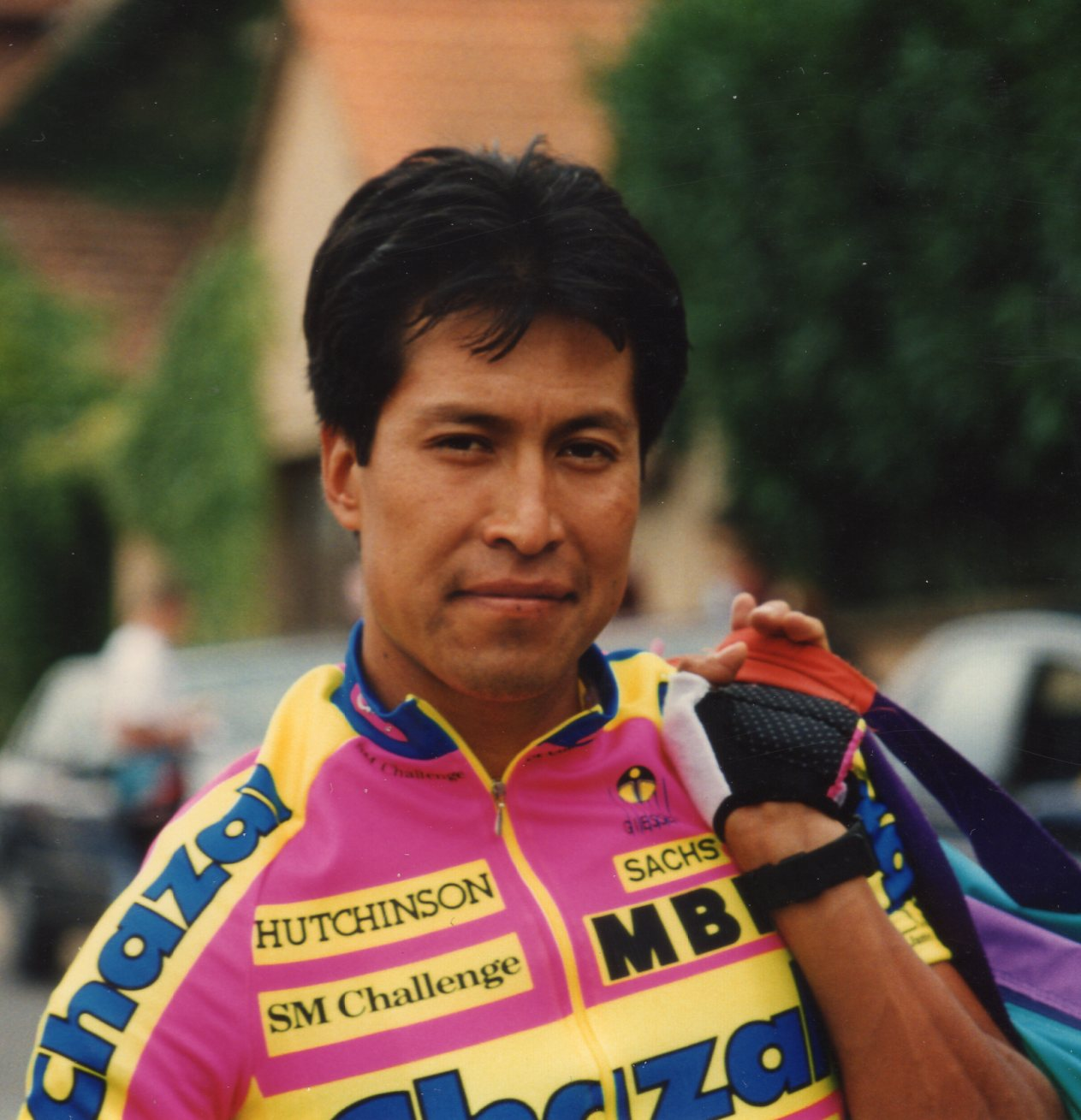

Personal information
- Born: 6 December 1966 Huamantla, Mexico
- Died: 30 January 2020 (aged 53) Puebla, Mexico
- Height: 1.61 m (5 ft 3 in)
- Weight: 59 kg (130 lb; 9 st 4 lb)

Cycling career
- Sport: Cycling
- Discipline: Road
- Role: Rider

Amateur team
- 1998–2001: Canel's-Turbo

Professional teams
- 1989: AD Renting–W-Cup–Bottecchia
- 1990–1991: Z–Tomasso
- 1992: GB–MG Maglificio
- 1993: Subaru–Montgomery
- 1994: Catavana–AS Corbeil–Essonnes–Cedico
- 1994–1995: Chazal–MBK
- 1996: Force Sud
- 1997: BigMat–Auber 93

Fernando Miguel Arroyo Rosales (6 December 1966 – 30 January 2020) was a Mexican road racing cyclist. He was born in Huamantla, and was a professional from 1989 to 1997.

== Major results ==
1988
1st Overall Vuelta de la Juventud Mexicana
1989
3rd Overall Vuelta y Ruta de Mexico
1990
2nd Overall Vuelta y Ruta de Mexico
1991
1st Stage 15 Vuelta y Ruta de Mexico
3rd GP Ouest-France
4th Overall Tour de Suisse
1993
1st Stage 2 Redlands Bicycle Classic
1st Stage 7 Vuelta y Ruta de Mexico
4th Classique des Alpes
7th Grand Prix de Wallonie
9th Overall Critérium du Dauphiné Libéré
1994
2nd Overall Vuelta y Ruta de Mexico
8th Overall Grand Prix du Midi Libre
1995
3rd Overall Vuelta y Ruta de Mexico
7th Overall Critérium du Dauphiné Libéré
8th Classique des Alpes
1997
9th Tour du Haut Var
1998
1st Overall Vuelta Mexico Telmex
1999
1st Overall Vuelta Ciclista a Costa Rica
2000
1st Road race, National Road Championships
1st Stage 5 Vuelta a Guatemala
3rd Overall Vuelta Ciclista a Costa Rica
2001
2nd Road race, National Road Championships

=== Grand Tour general classification results timeline ===
Grand Tour	1989	1990	1991	1992	1993	1994	1995	1996	1997
Vuelta a España	—	—	—	36	—	—	DNF	—	—
Giro d'Italia	60	—	25	—	—	—	—	—	—
Tour de France	—	—	—	—	—	48	61	—	76
