= Dominik Krieger =

German cyclist

Personal information
- Born: 25 June 1968 (age 58) Herrenberg, Germany

Cycling career
- Sport: Cycling
- Current team: Retired
- Discipline: Road
- Role: Rider

Professional teams
- 1989–1992: Helvetia–La Suisse
- 1993–1994: Team Telekom

Dominik Krieger (born 25 June 1968 in Herrenberg) is a German former professional cyclist. He rode in 2 editions of the Tour de France and one Giro d'Italia.

== Major results ==
1988
1st Stage 7 Tour de l'Avenir
1989
1st Rund um Köln
