= Andreas Kappes =

German cyclist (1965–2018)

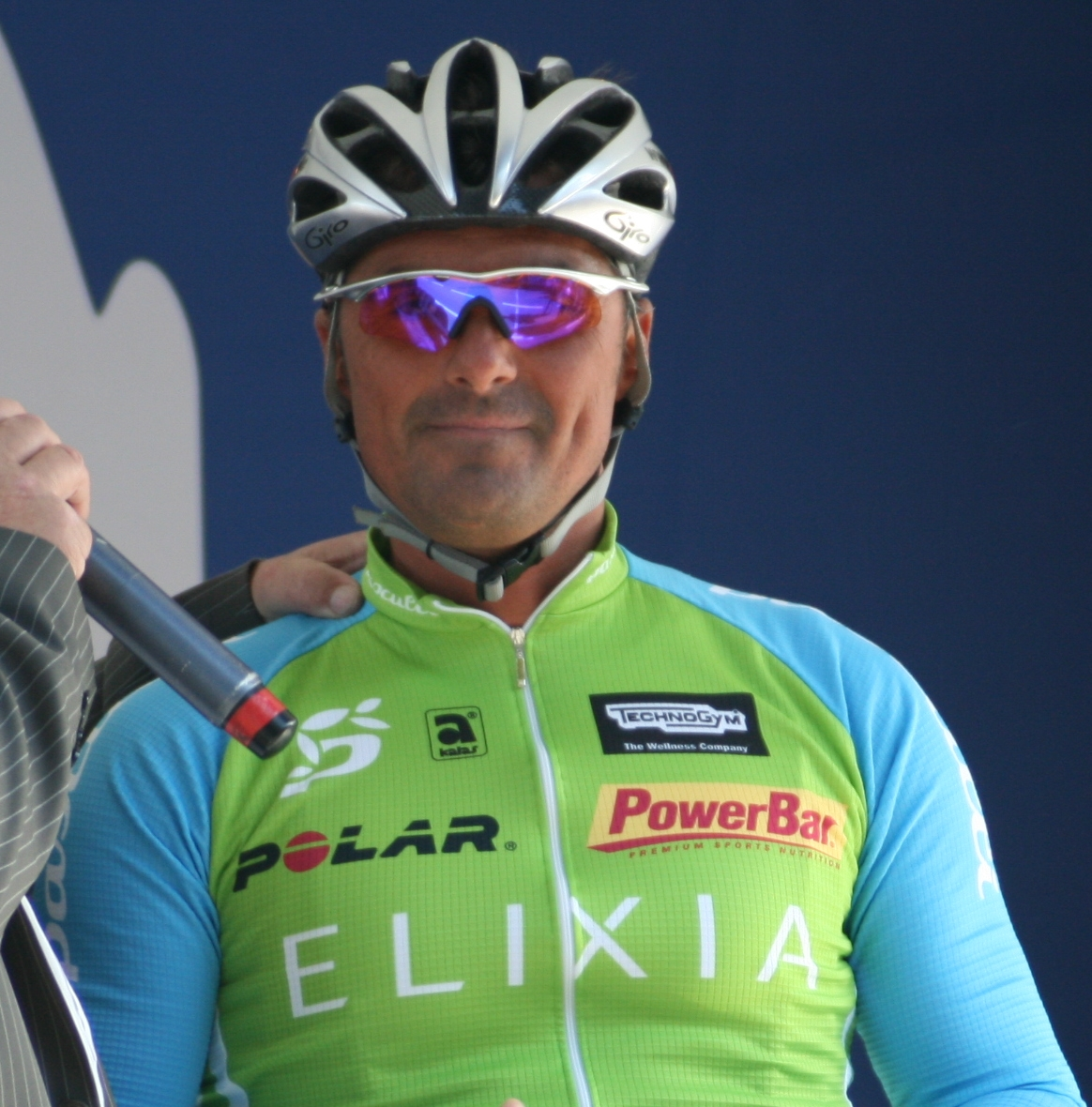
- Andreas Kappes in 2008

Personal information
- Born: 23 December 1965 Bremen, West Germany
- Died: 31 July 2018 (aged 52)

Cycling career
- Sport: Cycling
- Disciplines: Road; Track
- Role: Rider

Professional teams
- 1987–1990: Toshiba–Look
- 1991: Histor–Sigma
- 1992: Team Telekom
- 1993: Mecair–Ballan
- 1994: Trident–Schick
- 1995–1996: Refin
- 1996–1997: PSV Köln
- 1998: Team Gerolsteiner
- 1999–2001: Agro–Adler Brandenburg

Major wins
- Grand Tours Giro d'Italia 1 individual stage (1988) One-day races Omloop Het Volk (1991)

Andreas Kappes (23 December 1965 – 31 July 2018) was a German cyclist, who was a professional from 1987 to 2009, active on the road and on the track, collecting in total 133 wins, and, as an amateur, represented West Germany at the 1984 Summer Olympics in Los Angeles. During the first half of his career he mainly raced on the road, eventually resulting in 99 wins, including winning Omloop het Volk (1991), Tour de l'Oise (1991), three stages in the Tour de Suisse (1989, 1994), two stages in Paris–Nice (1988, 1991) and one stage in the 1988 Giro d'Italia. During the second half of his career he limited his activities on the road to mainly German criteriums as well as kermesses, which make up the chief part of his wins on the road. During the 1990s and 2000s he became known as a formidable track cyclist, including by winning 24 Six-day races (out of 122 starts), 13 of which with the Belgium Etienne De Wilde (out of 28 starts).

Kappes died as the result of an allergic reaction to an insect bite. He was 52.

== Major results ==
1986
4th Overall GP Tell

1st Stage 1

1987
Coors Classic

1st Stages 4 & 6b

1st Stage 5 Vuelta a Andalucía
8th Overall Tour de Suisse
1988
1st Stage 7 Giro d'Italia
1st Stage 6a Paris–Nice
1st Stage 1b GP du Midi-Libre
1st Boucles Parisiennes
2nd Grand Prix de Cannes
5th La Flèche Wallonne
9th Overall KBC Driedaagse van De Panne-Koksijde
1989
1st Overall Tour de Picardie

1st Stages 1 & 3b

1st Paris–Camembert
1st Stage 1 Volta a la Comunitat Valenciana
6th Züri-Metzgete
7th Overall 4 Jours de Dunkerque
8th Overall Tour de Suisse

1st Stages 7 & 8

10th Overall Critérium International
1990
2nd Rund um Köln
5th Paris–Tours
5th GP de Fourmies
7th Amstel Gold Race
8th Road race, UCI Road World Championships
1991
1st Omloop Het Volk
1st Trofeo Luis Puig
1st Stage 2 Paris–Nice
1st Stage 2 Tour of the Basque Country
1st Stage 4 Volta a la Comunitat Valenciana
2nd GP Ouest–France
4th Overall Vuelta a Andalucía
9th Clásica de San Sebastián
10th Milan–San Remo
10th Overall Tour du Limousin
1993
9th Wincanton Classic
10th Tour de Berne
1994
1st Stage 2 Tour de Suisse
1st Stage 5 4 Jours de Dunkerque
1st Tour de Berne
2nd Rund um den Henninger Turm
2nd Veenendaal–Veenendaal
3rd Omloop Het Volk
1995
9th Overall Hofbrau Cup

1st Stage 2

1996
1st Stage 2 Hessen-Rundfahrt
1st Stage 1 GP Tell
1997
3rd Overall Hofbrau Cup
9th Luk-Cup Bühl
1998
10th Road race, National Road Championships
1999
2nd Overall Deutschland Tour

1st Stage 5

2000
9th Luk-Cup Bühl
2001
5th Rund um Düren
