= Mauro Ribeiro =

Brazilian cyclist

Personal information
- Full name: Mauro Ribeiro
- Born: July 19, 1964 (age 62) Curitiba, Brazil

Cycling career
- Sport: Cycling
- Disciplines: Road; Track
- Role: Rider

Professional teams
- 1986–1992: RMO–Cycles Méral–Mavic
- 1993: Chazal–Vetta–MBK
- 1994: Lotto

Major wins
- Tour de France 1 individual stage (1991)

Mauro Ribeiro (Curitiba, 19 July 1964) is a Brazilian former professional road bicycle racer. In the 1991 Tour de France, he became the first and only Brazilian cyclist to win a stage in the Tour de France.

== Major results ==
1982
1st Points race, UCI World Junior Track Championships
1983
3rd Team pursuit, Pan American Games
1985
1st Overall Cinturón Ciclista a Mallorca
1987
9th Overall Tour de la Communauté Européenne
1988
9th Grand Prix d'Isbergues
1990
1st Stage 7 Paris–Nice
1991
1st Stage 9 Tour de France
1st Stage 5 Route du Sud
5th GP Ouest–France
1995
3rd Team pursuit, Pan American Games
