= Rudy Verdonck =

Belgian cyclist

Personal information
- Born: 7 August 1965 (age 61) Turnhout, Belgium

Cycling career
- Sport: Cycling
- Role: Rider

Rudy Verdonck (born 7 August 1965) is a Belgian former professional racing cyclist. He rode in three editions of the Tour de France.
