= Histor–Sigma =

Former Belgian cycling team (1986–1991)

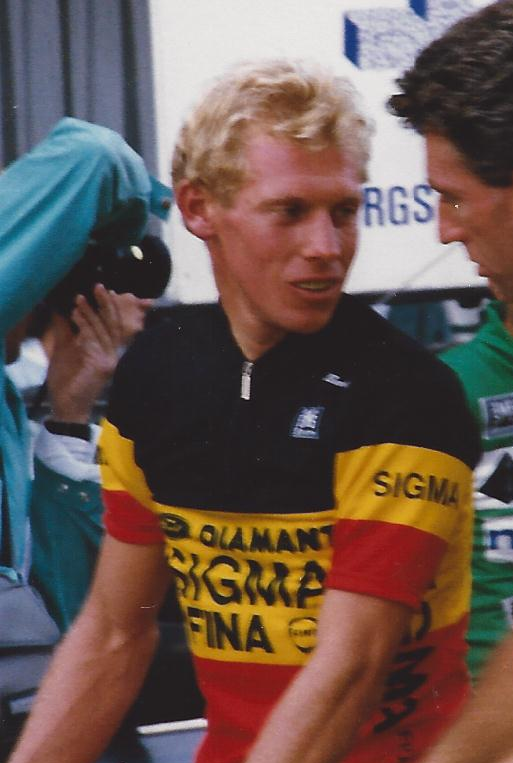
- Etienne De Wilde in 1988, wearing the Belgian national road race champion's jersey

Team information
- Registered: Belgium
- Founded: 1986
- Disbanded: 1991
- Discipline: Road

Team name history
- 1986 1987–1988 1989–1991: Sigma; Sigma–Fina; Histor–Sigma
Histor–Sigma jersey
Jersey

Histor–Sigma was a Belgian professional cycling team that existed from 1986 to 1991.

== In media ==
In Japan, in the 1993-1994 TV series Gosei Sentai Dairanger, The auxiliary Kiba/White Ranger, a young 10 year old boy known as Kou sports a Histor Sigma cap. It is unknown if the character is even aware who the cycling team are or if he is even interested in cycling.
