= Castorama (cycling team) =

French professional cycling team

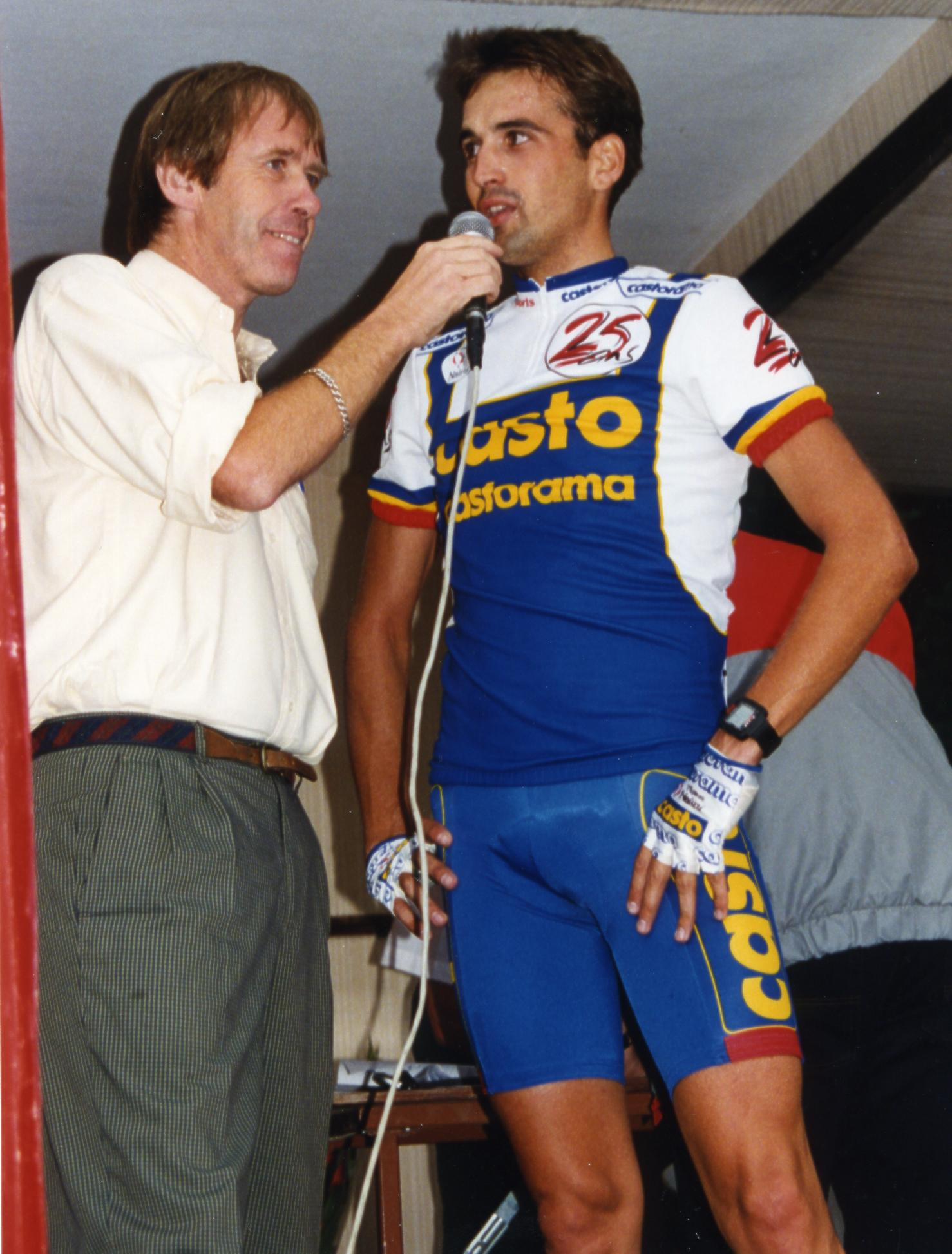
- Thomas Davy at the 1993 Tour de France

Team information
- Registered: France
- Founded: 1990
- Disbanded: 1995
- Discipline: Road

Team name history
- 1990 1991 1992–1995: Castorama; Castorama–Raleigh; Castorama

Castorama was a French professional cycling team that existed from 1990 to 1995 and was sponsored by the French DIY and home improvement retailer Castorama.

== History ==
The Castorama team traced back to a team that began in 1976 when former French cycling champion Cyrille Guimard retired from the sport and took over as the main directeur sportif of the Gitane–Campagnolo team. The Renault auto group bought out Gitane cycles and also took over sponsorship of the team making the Renault–Elf–Gitane team that dominated the sport from 1978 to 1984. At the end of 1985, Renault decided to retire from the sport so French co-operative Système U took over sponsorship from 1986 to 1989 making the Système U–Gitane cycling team. During 1989 the team was called Super U–Raleigh–Fiat after one of the supermarkets owned by the Système U group and rider Laurent Fignon became the number one ranked rider in the sport with his wins in Milan–San Remo, Grand Prix des Nations, 1989 Giro d'Italia and a very close second in the 1989 Tour de France.

In 1990 Castorama then took over the sponsorship of the team. For the first two years the team rode on Raleigh bikes but then rode on Cyrille Guimard bikes. Guimard was general manager from 1990 to 1995 while Jacques Cadion, Bernard Quilfren and Pascal Dubois were directeur sportifs. Fignon left the team and Guimard in 1992. Guimard had been his longtime mentor. Jacky Durand gave the team one of its biggest successes in 1992 when he won the Tour of Flanders. Durand attacked (with four others) at 217 km to the finish where there were 14 hills and 6 sections of cobblestones to be crossed.

It was said that one innovation that Guimard and Fignon introduced with the founding of the team is the formation of a holding company that controls the riders and sponsors' contracts. Prior to the introduction of this system, riders were often contracted directly with the sponsoring companies.

== Major wins ==
- World Cyclo Cross Championships 1993 (Arnould)
- France Cyclo Cross Championships 1990, 1993, 1994
- France Road Race Championships 1992, 1993, 1994
- France Time Trial Championships 1995
- Critérium International 1990
- Route du Sud 1990
- Tour de Luxembourg 1990
- GP de Wallonne 1990
- Tour du Haut Var 1990, 1992, 1994
- Grand Prix d'Isbergues 1990, 1991
- Paris–Camembert 1990, 1994
- Grand Prix de Denain 1990, 1991
- Tour of Flanders 1992
- Giro di Puglia 1992
- Tour de Picardie 1992
- Tour de l'Avenir 1993, 1995
- Four Days of Dunkirk 1993
- Regio-Tour International 1994
- Clásica de San Sebastián 1994
- GP d'Ouverture 1994
- Trophée des Grimpeurs 1995
