= 1993 Tour de France, Stage 11 to Stage 20 =

Cycling race stages

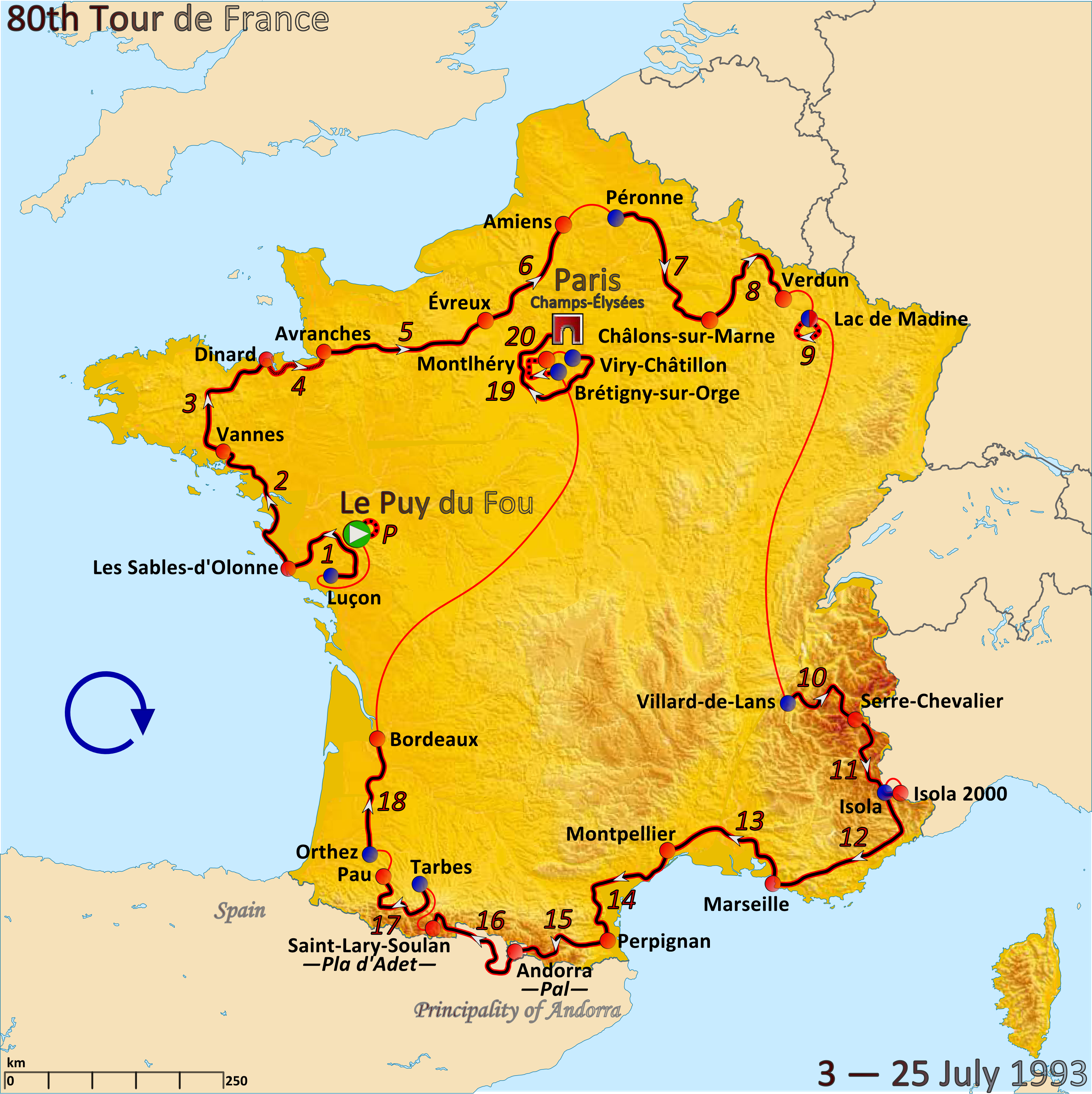
Route of the 1993 Tour de France

The 1993 Tour de France was the 80th edition of Tour de France, one of cycling's Grand Tours. The Tour began in Le Puy du Fou with a prologue individual time trial on 3 July and Stage 11 occurred on 15 July with a mountainous stage from Serre Chevalier. The race finished on the Champs-Élysées in Paris on 25 July.

== Stage 11 ==
15 July 1993 — Serre Chevalier to Isola 2000, 179 km (111.2 mi)

Stage 11 result

Rank	Rider	Team	Time
1	Tony Rominger (SUI)	Clas-Cajastur	5h 41' 03"
2	Miguel Indurain (ESP)	Banesto	s.t.
3	Claudio Chiappucci (ITA)	Carrera Jeans–Tassoni	+ 13"
4	Zenon Jaskuła (POL)	GB–MG Maglificio	+ 15"
5	Álvaro Mejía (COL)	Motorola	s.t.
6	Bjarne Riis (DEN)	Ariostea	+ 31"
7	Robert Millar (GBR)	TVM–Bison Kit	+ 1' 00"
8	Oliverio Rincón (COL)	Amaya Seguros	+ 2' 56"
9	Andrew Hampsten (USA)	Motorola	+ 3' 06"
10	Roberto Conti (ITA)	Ariostea	+ 3' 22"

General classification after stage 11

Rank	Rider	Team	Time
1	Miguel Indurain (ESP)	Banesto	46h 39' 20"
2	Álvaro Mejía (COL)	Motorola	+ 3' 23"
3	Zenon Jaskuła (POL)	GB–MG Maglificio	+ 4' 31"
4	Tony Rominger (SUI)	Clas-Cajastur	+ 5' 44"
5	Bjarne Riis (DEN)	Ariostea	+ 10' 26"
6	Andrew Hampsten (USA)	Motorola	+ 11' 12"
7	Claudio Chiappucci (ITA)	Carrera Jeans–Tassoni	+ 14' 09"
8	Erik Breukink (NED)	ONCE	+ 14' 54"
9	Pedro Delgado (ESP)	Banesto	+ 15' 32"
10	Oliverio Rincón (COL)	Amaya Seguros	+ 21' 17"

== Stage 12 ==
16 July 1993 — Isola to Marseille, 286.5 km (178.0 mi)

Stage 12 result

Rank	Rider	Team	Time
1	Fabio Roscioli (ITA)	Carrera Jeans–Tassoni	7h 29' 44"
2	Massimo Ghirotto (ITA)	ZG Mobili-Sidi	+ 7' 14"
3	Vladimir Poulnikov (UKR)	Carrera Jeans–Tassoni	s.t.
4	Valerio Tebaldi (ITA)	Gatorade–Mega Drive–Kenwood	+ 7' 17"
5	Djamolidine Abdoujaparov (UZB)	Lampre–Polti	+ 7' 34"
6	Laurent Jalabert (FRA)	ONCE	s.t.
7	Franco Ballerini (ITA)	GB–MG Maglificio	+ 7' 36"
8	Olaf Ludwig (GER)	Team Telekom	+ 8' 25"
9	Andrea Tafi (ITA)	Carrera Jeans–Tassoni	s.t.
10	Richard Virenque (FRA)	Festina–Lotus	+ 16' 58"

General classification after stage 12

Rank	Rider	Team	Time
1	Miguel Indurain (ESP)	Banesto	54h 29' 39"
2	Álvaro Mejía (COL)	Motorola	+ 3' 23"
3	Zenon Jaskuła (POL)	GB–MG Maglificio	+ 4' 31"
4	Tony Rominger (SUI)	Clas-Cajastur	+ 5' 44"
5	Bjarne Riis (DEN)	Ariostea	+ 10' 26"
6	Andrew Hampsten (USA)	Motorola	+ 11' 12"
7	Claudio Chiappucci (ITA)	Carrera Jeans–Tassoni	+ 14' 09"
8	Vladimir Poulnikov (UKR)	Carrera Jeans–Tassoni	+ 14' 21"
9	Erik Breukink (NED)	ONCE	+ 14' 54"
10	Pedro Delgado (ESP)	Banesto	+ 15' 32"

== Stage 13 ==
17 July 1993 — Marseille to Montpellier, 181.5 km (112.8 mi)

Stage 13 result

Rank	Rider	Team	Time
1	Olaf Ludwig (GER)	Team Telekom	4h 13' 10"
2	Djamolidine Abdoujaparov (UZB)	Lampre–Polti	s.t.
3	Johan Museeuw (BEL)	GB–MG Maglificio	s.t.
4	Giovanni Fidanza (ITA)	Gatorade–Mega Drive–Kenwood	s.t.
5	Frédéric Moncassin (FRA)	WordPerfect–Colnago–Decca	s.t.
6	Laurent Jalabert (FRA)	ONCE	s.t.
7	François Simon (FRA)	Castorama	s.t.
8	Christophe Capelle (FRA)	GAN	s.t.
9	Uwe Raab (GER)	Team Telekom	s.t.
10	Jelle Nijdam (NED)	WordPerfect–Colnago–Decca	s.t.

General classification after stage 13

Rank	Rider	Team	Time
1	Miguel Indurain (ESP)	Banesto	58h 42' 49"
2	Álvaro Mejía (COL)	Motorola	+ 3' 23"
3	Zenon Jaskuła (POL)	GB–MG Maglificio	+ 4' 45"
4	Tony Rominger (SUI)	Clas-Cajastur	+ 5' 44"
5	Bjarne Riis (DEN)	Ariostea	+ 10' 26"
6	Andrew Hampsten (USA)	Motorola	+ 11' 12"
7	Claudio Chiappucci (ITA)	Carrera Jeans–Tassoni	+ 14' 09"
8	Vladimir Poulnikov (UKR)	Carrera Jeans–Tassoni	+ 14' 35"
9	Erik Breukink (NED)	ONCE	+ 15' 08"
10	Pedro Delgado (ESP)	Banesto	+ 15' 46"

== Stage 14 ==
18 July 1993 — Montpellier to Perpignan, 223 km (139 mi)

Stage 14 result

Rank	Rider	Team	Time
1	Pascal Lino (FRA)	Festina–Lotus	5h 28' 51"
2	Giancarlo Perini (ITA)	ZG Mobili-Sidi	s.t.
3	Johan Bruyneel (BEL)	ONCE	+ 13"
4	Mario Chiesa (ITA)	Carrera Jeans–Tassoni	s.t.
5	Gianni Faresin (ITA)	ZG Mobili-Sidi	s.t.
6	Djamolidine Abdoujaparov (UZB)	Lampre–Polti	+ 16' 19"
7	Laurent Jalabert (FRA)	ONCE	s.t.
8	Christophe Capelle (FRA)	GAN	s.t.
9	François Simon (FRA)	Castorama	s.t.
10	Giovanni Fidanza (ITA)	Gatorade–Mega Drive–Kenwood	s.t.

General classification after stage 14

Rank	Rider	Team	Time
1	Miguel Indurain (ESP)	Banesto	64h 27' 59"
2	Álvaro Mejía (COL)	Motorola	+ 3' 23"
3	Zenon Jaskuła (POL)	GB–MG Maglificio	+ 4' 45"
4	Tony Rominger (SUI)	Clas-Cajastur	+ 5' 44"
5	Bjarne Riis (DEN)	Ariostea	+ 10' 26"
6	Andrew Hampsten (USA)	Motorola	+ 11' 12"
7	Claudio Chiappucci (ITA)	Carrera Jeans–Tassoni	+ 14' 09"
8	Johan Bruyneel (BEL)	ONCE	+ 14' 30"
9	Vladimir Poulnikov (UKR)	Carrera Jeans–Tassoni	+ 14' 35"
10	Erik Breukink (NED)	ONCE	+ 15' 08"

== Stage 15 ==
19 July 1993 — Perpignan to Pal, 231.5 km (143.8 mi)

Stage 15 result

Rank	Rider	Team	Time
1	Oliverio Rincón (COL)	Amaya Seguros	7h 20' 19"
2	Tony Rominger (SUI)	Clas-Cajastur	+ 1' 50"
3	Bjarne Riis (DEN)	Ariostea	s.t.
4	Zenon Jaskuła (POL)	GB–MG Maglificio	s.t.
5	Miguel Indurain (ESP)	Banesto	s.t.
6	Álvaro Mejía (COL)	Motorola	s.t.
7	Jean-Philippe Dojwa (FRA)	Festina–Lotus	+ 1' 52"
8	Claudio Chiappucci (ITA)	Carrera Jeans–Tassoni	s.t.
9	Antonio Martín (ESP)	Amaya Seguros	+ 2' 02"
10	Jon Unzaga (ESP)	Clas-Cajastur	+ 2' 09"

General classification after stage 15

Rank	Rider	Team	Time
1	Miguel Indurain (ESP)	Banesto	71h 50' 08"
2	Álvaro Mejía (COL)	Motorola	+ 3' 23"
3	Zenon Jaskuła (POL)	GB–MG Maglificio	+ 4' 45"
4	Tony Rominger (SUI)	Clas-Cajastur	+ 5' 44"
5	Bjarne Riis (DEN)	Ariostea	+ 10' 26"
6	Andrew Hampsten (USA)	Motorola	+ 13' 30"
7	Claudio Chiappucci (ITA)	Carrera Jeans–Tassoni	+ 14' 11"
8	Johan Bruyneel (BEL)	ONCE	+ 14' 54"
9	Vladimir Poulnikov (UKR)	Carrera Jeans–Tassoni	+ 15' 08"
10	Pedro Delgado (ESP)	Banesto	+ 16' 09"

== Stage 16 ==
21 July 1993 — Andorra to Saint-Lary-Soulan Pla d'Adet, 230 km (140 mi)

Stage 16 result

Rank	Rider	Team	Time
1	Zenon Jaskuła (POL)	GB–MG Maglificio	7h 21' 01"
2	Tony Rominger (SUI)	Clas-Cajastur	s.t.
3	Miguel Indurain (ESP)	Banesto	+ 3"
4	Stephen Roche (IRL)	Carrera Jeans–Tassoni	+ 25"
5	Robert Millar (GBR)	TVM–Bison Kit	+ 1' 06"
6	Andrew Hampsten (USA)	Motorola	+ 1' 08"
7	Álvaro Mejía (COL)	Motorola	s.t.
8	Richard Virenque (FRA)	Festina–Lotus	+ 1' 35"
9	Jon Unzaga (ESP)	Clas-Cajastur	s.t.
10	Claudio Chiappucci (ITA)	Carrera Jeans–Tassoni	s.t.

General classification after stage 16

Rank	Rider	Team	Time
1	Miguel Indurain (ESP)	Banesto	79h 11' 12"
2	Álvaro Mejía (COL)	Motorola	+ 4' 28"
3	Zenon Jaskuła (POL)	GB–MG Maglificio	+ 4' 42"
4	Tony Rominger (SUI)	Clas-Cajastur	+ 5' 41"
5	Bjarne Riis (DEN)	Ariostea	+ 12' 15"
6	Andrew Hampsten (USA)	Motorola	+ 14' 35"
7	Claudio Chiappucci (ITA)	Carrera Jeans–Tassoni	+ 15' 43"
8	Johan Bruyneel (BEL)	ONCE	+ 16' 30"
9	Pedro Delgado (ESP)	Banesto	+ 19' 21"
10	Vladimir Poulnikov (UKR)	Carrera Jeans–Tassoni	+ 20' 40"

== Stage 17 ==
22 July 1993 — Tarbes to Pau, 190 km (120 mi)

Stage 17 result

Rank	Rider	Team	Time
1	Claudio Chiappucci (ITA)	Carrera Jeans–Tassoni	5h 05' 33"
2	Massimo Ghirotto (ITA)	ZG Mobili-Sidi	s.t.
3	Jon Unzaga (ESP)	Clas-Cajastur	s.t.
4	Bjarne Riis (DEN)	Ariostea	+ 1' 17"
5	Viatcheslav Ekimov (RUS)	Histor-Novemail	+ 1' 21"
6	Jean-Philippe Dojwa (FRA)	Festina–Lotus	s.t.
7	Jesper Skibby (DEN)	TVM–Bison Kit	+ 1' 24"
8	Johan Museeuw (BEL)	GB–MG Maglificio	s.t.
9	Max Sciandri (GBR)	Motorola	s.t.
10	Stefano Colagè (ITA)	ZG Mobili-Sidi	s.t.

General classification after stage 17

Rank	Rider	Team	Time
1	Miguel Indurain (ESP)	Banesto	84h 18' 09"
2	Álvaro Mejía (COL)	Motorola	+ 4' 28"
3	Zenon Jaskuła (POL)	GB–MG Maglificio	+ 4' 42"
4	Tony Rominger (SUI)	Clas-Cajastur	+ 5' 41"
5	Bjarne Riis (DEN)	Ariostea	+ 12' 08"
6	Claudio Chiappucci (ITA)	Carrera Jeans–Tassoni	+ 14' 19"
7	Andrew Hampsten (USA)	Motorola	+ 14' 35"
8	Johan Bruyneel (BEL)	ONCE	+ 16' 30"
9	Pedro Delgado (ESP)	Banesto	+ 19' 21"
10	Vladimir Poulnikov (UKR)	Carrera Jeans–Tassoni	+ 20' 40"

== Stage 18 ==
23 July 1993 — Orthez to Bordeaux, 199.5 km (124.0 mi)

Stage 18 result

Rank	Rider	Team	Time
1	Djamolidine Abdoujaparov (UZB)	Lampre–Polti	5h 09' 04"
2	Frankie Andreu (USA)	Motorola	s.t.
3	Rolf Sørensen (DEN)	Carrera Jeans–Tassoni	s.t.
4	Frans Maassen (NED)	WordPerfect–Colnago–Decca	s.t.
5	Dag Otto Lauritzen (NOR)	TVM–Bison Kit	s.t.
6	Stefano Colagè (ITA)	ZG Mobili-Sidi	s.t.
7	François Simon (FRA)	Castorama	s.t.
8	Rolf Aldag (GER)	Team Telekom	s.t.
9	Jacky Durand (FRA)	Castorama	s.t.
10	Brian Holm (DEN)	Team Telekom	s.t.

General classification after stage 18

Rank	Rider	Team	Time
1	Miguel Indurain (ESP)	Banesto	89h 32' 05"
2	Álvaro Mejía (COL)	Motorola	+ 4' 28"
3	Zenon Jaskuła (POL)	GB–MG Maglificio	+ 4' 42"
4	Tony Rominger (SUI)	Clas-Cajastur	+ 5' 41"
5	Bjarne Riis (DEN)	Ariostea	+ 12' 08"
6	Claudio Chiappucci (ITA)	Carrera Jeans–Tassoni	+ 14' 19"
7	Andrew Hampsten (USA)	Motorola	+ 14' 35"
8	Johan Bruyneel (BEL)	ONCE	+ 16' 30"
9	Pedro Delgado (ESP)	Banesto	+ 19' 21"
10	Vladimir Poulnikov (UKR)	Carrera Jeans–Tassoni	+ 20' 40"

== Stage 19 ==
24 July 1993 — Brétigny-sur-Orge to Montlhéry, 48 km (30 mi) (ITT)

Stage 19 result

Rank	Rider	Team	Time
1	Tony Rominger (SUI)	Clas-Cajastur	57' 02"
2	Miguel Indurain (ESP)	Banesto	+ 42"
3	Zenon Jaskuła (POL)	GB–MG Maglificio	+ 1' 48"
4	Johan Bruyneel (BEL)	ONCE	+ 2' 16"
5	Gianni Bugno (ITA)	Gatorade–Mega Drive–Kenwood	+ 3' 00"
6	Jean-François Bernard (FRA)	Banesto	+ 3' 05"
7	Viatcheslav Ekimov (RUS)	Histor-Novemail	+ 3' 09"
8	Philippe Louviot (FRA)	ONCE	+ 3' 30"
9	Claudio Chiappucci (ITA)	Carrera Jeans–Tassoni	+ 3' 41"
10	Álvaro Mejía (COL)	Motorola	+ 3' 43"

General classification after stage 19

Rank	Rider	Team	Time
1	Miguel Indurain (ESP)	Banesto	90h 29' 49"
2	Tony Rominger (SUI)	Clas-Cajastur	+ 4' 59"
3	Zenon Jaskuła (POL)	GB–MG Maglificio	+ 5' 48"
4	Álvaro Mejía (COL)	Motorola	+ 7' 29"
5	Bjarne Riis (DEN)	Ariostea	+ 16' 26"
6	Claudio Chiappucci (ITA)	Carrera Jeans–Tassoni	+ 17' 18"
7	Johan Bruyneel (BEL)	ONCE	+ 18' 04"
8	Andrew Hampsten (USA)	Motorola	+ 20' 18"
9	Pedro Delgado (ESP)	Banesto	+ 23' 57"
10	Vladimir Poulnikov (UKR)	Carrera Jeans–Tassoni	+ 25' 29"

== Stage 20 ==
25 July 1993 — Viry-Châtillon to Paris Champs-Élysées, 196.5 km (122.1 mi)

Stage 20 result

Rank	Rider	Team	Time
1	Djamolidine Abdoujaparov (UZB)	Lampre–Polti	5h 27' 20"
2	Frédéric Moncassin (FRA)	WordPerfect–Colnago–Decca	s.t.
3	Stefano Colagè (ITA)	ZG Mobili-Sidi	s.t.
4	Uwe Raab (GER)	Team Telekom	s.t.
5	Max Sciandri (ITA)	Motorola	s.t.
6	Phil Anderson (AUS)	Motorola	s.t.
7	Johan Museeuw (BEL)	GB–MG Maglificio	s.t.
8	Giovanni Fidanza (ITA)	Gatorade–Mega Drive–Kenwood	s.t.
9	Christophe Capelle (FRA)	GAN	s.t.
10	Marc Sergeant (BEL)	Histor-Novemail	s.t.

General classification after stage 20

Rank	Rider	Team	Time
1	Miguel Indurain (ESP)	Banesto	95h 57' 09"
2	Tony Rominger (SUI)	Clas-Cajastur	+ 4' 59"
3	Zenon Jaskuła (POL)	GB–MG Maglificio	+ 5' 48"
4	Álvaro Mejía (COL)	Motorola	+ 7' 29"
5	Bjarne Riis (DEN)	Ariostea	+ 16' 26"
6	Claudio Chiappucci (ITA)	Carrera Jeans–Tassoni	+ 17' 18"
7	Johan Bruyneel (BEL)	ONCE	+ 18' 04"
8	Andrew Hampsten (USA)	Motorola	+ 20' 14"
9	Pedro Delgado (ESP)	Banesto	+ 23' 57"
10	Vladimir Poulnikov (UKR)	Carrera Jeans–Tassoni	+ 25' 29"
