= Young rider classification =

Award for leading cyclists under 25 years old

Young rider classification (French: classement général des jeunes) in a cycling jersey competition in multi-day stage race events, such as the Tour de France, Giro d'Italia and many others, is an award for the current leader by overall time for riders below the age of twenty-six years (or twenty-three years) depending on the race rules. At the Tour Down Under recipients are aged under twenty-six. Recipients are commonly known as the Best young rider.

In stage racing, the fastest overall time of all riders below the age limit is awarded the cycling jersey, often the jersey color is white, in the same fashion the fastest time of all riders (regardless of age) is awarded in the general classification.

If the best young rider is also the leader of the general classification, points classification or mountains classification, then the rider wears the most prestigious jersey and the next young rider in the classification not holding a more prestigious jersey will wear the young rider jersey. Article 2.6.018 of the UCI regulations on road cycling states:

"On the basis of the classifications, only 4 leader’s jerseys of the race can be issued in events of the UCI WorldTour and continental circuits of classes HC and 1 for the men elite and under 23, and a maximum of 6 jerseys in other events. Only the leader's jersey for the individual general classification by time is compulsory.

The leader of each classification, except the team classification, shall be required to wear the corresponding distinctive jersey.

If a rider is leading more than one classification, the order of priority of the distinctive jerseys shall be as follows:

1. general classification by time;

2. general classification by points;

3. general climber's classification;

4. others (young rider, combined, etc.); the order of priority among these other jerseys shall be set by the organiser.

In this situation, the organiser may require another rider next on the relevant classification to wear a jersey which is not being worn by the leader of that classification. However, if this rider must wear his world or national champion's jersey, or the leader's jersey of a UCI cup, circuit, series or classification, he shall wear that jersey.

In the situation where the leader of a classification does not take the start of a stage, the virtual leader of the relevant classification is allowed to wear the related distinctive jersey, subject to the consent of both the organiser and the president of the commissaires’ panel.

The riders of the team leading the team classification shall be required to wear the corresponding distinctive bib number if required by the organiser.

The presentation of a team leader jersey is prohibited both in the protocol and in the race.

No leaders’ jersey of the race or distinctive sign can be worn by a rider during the first day (prologue or stage) of a stage race.

Wearing a leader’s jersey or distinctive sign is prohibited in the case referred to in article 1.3.055 bis, point 5."

== Young rider classification winners of the Grand Tours ==
Until 2016, the young rider classification existed only in two of the three Grand Tours, the Tour de France and the Giro d'Italia. The Vuelta a España introduced an award for the best young rider in its 2017 edition. However, in the 2017 and 2018 editions, the awardee did not wear a white jersey, but a red number bib instead. The white jersey was awarded at the Vuelta for the first time in the 2019 edition as the organizers had decided to eliminate the combination classification.

=== Winners by year ===
Legend
Rider also won General and Mountains classification
Rider also won General classification
Rider also won Mountains classification

Year	Giro d'Italia	Tour de France	Vuelta a España
1975	Not awarded	Francesco Moser (ITA) (1/1)	Introduced in 2017
1976	Alfio Vandi (ITA) (1/1)	Enrique Martinez-Heredia (ESP) (1/1)	Introduced in 2017
1977	Mario Beccia (ITA) (1/1)	Dietrich Thurau (GER) (1/1)	Introduced in 2017
1978	Roberto Visentini (ITA) (1/1)	Henk Lubberding (NED) (1/1)	Introduced in 2017
1979	Silvano Contini (ITA) (1/1)	Jean-Rene Bernaudeau (FRA) (1/1)	Introduced in 2017
1980	Tommy Prim (SWE) (1/1)	Johan Van der Velde (NED) (1/1)	Introduced in 2017
1981	Giuseppe Faraca (ITA) (1/1)	Peter Winnen (NED) (1/1)	Introduced in 2017
1982	Marco Groppo (ITA) (1/1)	Phil Anderson (AUS) (1/1)	Introduced in 2017
1983	Franco Chioccioli (ITA) (1/1)	Laurent Fignon (FRA) (1/1)	Introduced in 2017
1984	Charly Mottet (FRA) (1/1)	Greg LeMond (USA) (1/1)	Introduced in 2017
1985	Alberto Volpi (ITA) (1/1)	Fabio Parra (COL) (1/1)	Introduced in 2017
1986	Marco Giovannetti (ITA) (1/1)	Andrew Hampsten (USA) (1/1)	Introduced in 2017
1987	Roberto Conti (ITA) (1/1)	Raúl Alcalá (MEX) (1/1)	Introduced in 2017
1988	Stefano Tomasini (ITA) (1/1)	Erik Breukink (NED) (1/1)	Introduced in 2017
1989	Vladimir Poulnikov (URS) (1/2)	Fabrice Philipot (FRA) (1/1)	Introduced in 2017
1990	Vladimir Poulnikov (URS) (2/2)	Gilles Delion (FRA) (1/1)	Introduced in 2017
1991	Massimiliano Lelli (ITA) (1/1)	Álvaro Mejía (COL) (1/1)	Introduced in 2017
1992	Pavel Tonkov (CIS) (1/2)	Eddy Bouwmans (NED) (1/1)	Introduced in 2017
1993	Pavel Tonkov (CIS) (2/2)	Antonio Martín Velasco (ESP) (1/1)	Introduced in 2017
1994	Eugeni Berzin (RUS) (2/2)	Marco Pantani (ITA) (1/2)	Introduced in 2017
1995	Not awarded	Marco Pantani (ITA) (2/2)	Introduced in 2017
1996	Not awarded	Jan Ullrich (GER) (1/3)	Introduced in 2017
1997	Not awarded	Jan Ullrich (GER) (2/3)	Introduced in 2017
1998	Not awarded	Jan Ullrich (GER) (3/3)	Introduced in 2017
1999	Not awarded	Benoît Salmon (FRA) (1/1)	Introduced in 2017
2000	Not awarded	Francisco Mancebo (ESP) (1/1)	Introduced in 2017
2001	Not awarded	Óscar Sevilla (ESP) (1/1)	Introduced in 2017
2002	Not awarded	Ivan Basso (ITA) (1/1)	Introduced in 2017
2003	Not awarded	Denis Menchov (RUS) (1/1)	Introduced in 2017
2004	Not awarded	Vladimir Karpets (RUS) (1/1)	Introduced in 2017
2005	Not awarded	Yaroslav Popovych (UKR) (1/1)	Introduced in 2017
2006	Not awarded	Damiano Cunego (ITA) (1/1)	Introduced in 2017
2007	Andy Schleck (LUX) (1/4)	Alberto Contador (ESP) (1/1)	Introduced in 2017
2008	Riccardo Riccò (ITA) (1/1)	Andy Schleck (LUX) (2/4)	Introduced in 2017
2009	Kevin Seeldraeyers (BEL) (1/1)	Andy Schleck (LUX) (3/4)	Introduced in 2017
2010	Richie Porte (AUS) (1/1)	Andy Schleck (LUX) (4/4)	Introduced in 2017
2011	Roman Kreuziger (CZE) (1/1)	Pierre Rolland (FRA) (1/1)	Introduced in 2017
2012	Rigoberto Urán (COL) (1/1)	Tejay van Garderen (USA) (1/1)	Introduced in 2017
2013	Carlos Betancur (COL) (1/1)	Nairo Quintana (COL) (1/3)	Introduced in 2017
2014	Nairo Quintana (COL) (2/3)	Thibaut Pinot (FRA) (1/1)	Introduced in 2017
2015	Fabio Aru (ITA) (1/1)	Nairo Quintana (COL) (3/3)	Introduced in 2017
2016	Bob Jungels (LUX) (1/2)	Adam Yates (GBR) (1/1)	Introduced in 2017
2017	Bob Jungels (LUX) (2/2)	Simon Yates (GBR) (1/1)	Miguel Ángel López (COL) (1/3)
2018	Miguel Ángel López (COL) (2/3)	Pierre Latour (FRA) (1/1)	Enric Mas (ESP) (1/2)
2019	Miguel Ángel López (COL) (3/3)	Egan Bernal (COL) (1/2)	Tadej Pogačar (SLO) (1/5)
2020	Tao Geoghegan Hart (GBR) (3/3)	Tadej Pogačar (SLO) (2/5)	Enric Mas (ESP) (2/2)
2021	Egan Bernal (COL) (2/2)	Tadej Pogačar (SLO) (3/5)	Gino Mäder (SUI) (1/1)
2022	Juan Pedro López (ESP) (1/1)	Tadej Pogačar (SLO) (4/5)	Remco Evenepoel (BEL) (1/2)
2023	João Almeida (POR) (1/1)	Tadej Pogačar (SLO) (5/5)	Juan Ayuso (ESP) (1/1)
2024	Antonio Tiberi (ITA) (1/1)	Remco Evenepoel (BEL) (2/2)	Mattias Skjelmose (DEN) (1/1)
2025	Isaac del Toro (MEX) (1/2)	Florian Lipowitz (GER) (1/1)	Matthew Riccitello (USA) (1/1)
2026	Afonso Eulálio (POR) (1/1)	Isaac del Toro (MEX) (2/2)	Oscar Onley (GBR) (1/1)
Year	Giro d'Italia	Tour de France	Vuelta a España

=== Most white jerseys ===
Rank	Rider	Total	Giro	Tour	Vuelta
1	(Slovenia) Tadej Pogačar	5	–	4 (2020, 2021, 2022, 2023)	1 (2019)
2	(Luxembourg) Andy Schleck	4	1 (2007)	3 (2008, 2009, 2010)	–
3	(Germany) Jan Ullrich	3	–	3 (1996, 1997, 1998)	–
3	(Colombia) Nairo Quintana	3	1 (2014)	2 (2013, 2015)	–
3	(Spain) Miguel Ángel López	3	2 (2018, 2019)	–	1 (2017)
6	(Soviet Union) Vladimir Poulnikov	2	2 (1989, 1990)	–	–
6	(Russia) Pavel Tonkov	2	2 (1992, 1993)	–	–
6	(Italy) Marco Pantani	2	–	2 (1994, 1995)	–
6	(Luxembourg) Bob Jungels	2	2 (2016, 2017)	–	–
6	(Spain) Enric Mas	2	–	–	2 (2018, 2020)
6	(Colombia) Egan Bernal	2	1 (2021)	1 (2019)	–
6	(Belgium) Remco Evenepoel	2	–	1 (2024)	1 (2022)
6	(Mexico) Isaac del Toro	2	1 (2025)	1 (2026)	–
