= 1993 Tour de France, Prologue to Stage 10 =

Cycling race stages

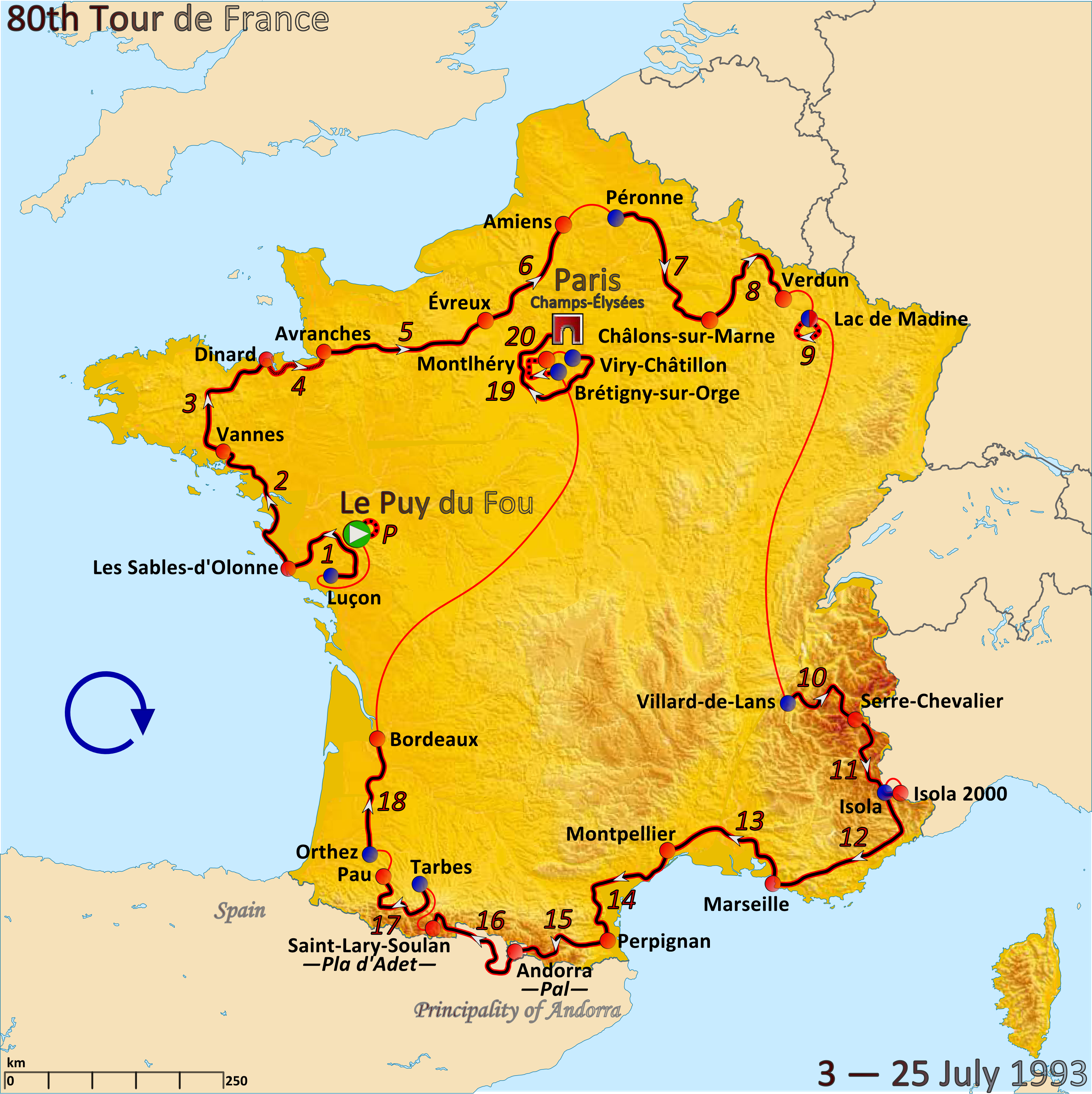
Route of the 1993 Tour de France

The 1993 Tour de France was the 80th edition of Tour de France, one of cycling's Grand Tours. The Tour began in Le Puy du Fou with a prologue individual time trial on 3 July and Stage 10 occurred on 14 July with a mountainous stage to Serre Chevalier. The race finished on the Champs-Élysées in Paris on 25 July.

== Prologue ==
3 July 1993 — Le Puy du Fou, 6.8 km (4.2 mi) (ITT)

Prologue result and general classification after prologue

Rank	Rider	Team	Time
1	Miguel Indurain (ESP)	Banesto	8' 12"
2	Alex Zülle (SUI)	ONCE	+ 8"
3	Gianni Bugno (ITA)	Gatorade–Mega Drive–Kenwood	+ 11"
4	Thierry Marie (FRA)	Festina–Lotus	+ 13"
5	Tony Rominger (SUI)	Clas-Cajastur	+ 14"
6	Rolf Sørensen (DEN)	Carrera Jeans–Tassoni	+ 18"
7	Raúl Alcalá (MEX)	WordPerfect–Colnago–Decca	s.t.
8	Claudio Chiappucci (ITA)	Carrera Jeans–Tassoni	+ 20"
9	Laurent Jalabert (FRA)	ONCE	+ 23"
10	Stephen Roche (IRL)	Carrera Jeans–Tassoni	+ 24"

== Stage 1 ==
4 July 1993 — Luçon to Les Sables-d'Olonne, 215 km (133.6 mi)

Stage 1 result

Rank	Rider	Team	Time
1	Mario Cipollini (ITA)	GB–MG Maglificio	5h 02' 45"
2	Wilfried Nelissen (BEL)	Histor-Novemail	s.t.
3	Laurent Jalabert (FRA)	ONCE	s.t.
4	Olaf Ludwig (GER)	Team Telekom	s.t.
5	Johan Capiot (BEL)	TVM–Bison Kit	s.t.
6	Jaan Kirsipuu (EST)	Chazal–Vetta–MBK	s.t.
7	Jean-Paul van Poppel (NED)	Festina–Lotus	s.t.
8	Ján Svorada (SVK)	Lampre–Polti	s.t.
9	Andrea Ferrigato (ITA)	Ariostea	s.t.
10	Max Sciandri (ITA)	Motorola	s.t.

General classification after stage 1

Rank	Rider	Team	Time
1	Miguel Indurain (ESP)	Banesto	5h 00' 41"
2	Alex Zülle (SUI)	ONCE	+ 12"
3	Laurent Jalabert (FRA)	ONCE	+ 13"
4	Gianni Bugno (ITA)	Gatorade–Mega Drive–Kenwood	+ 15"
5	Wilfried Nelissen (BEL)	Festina–Lotus	+ 17"
6	Thierry Marie (FRA)	Festina–Lotus	s.t.
7	Tony Rominger (SUI)	Clas-Cajastur	+ 18"
8	Mario Cipollini (ITA)	WordPerfect–Colnago–Decca	+ 20"
9	Rolf Sørensen (DEN)	Carrera Jeans–Tassoni	+ 22"
10	Raúl Alcalá (MEX)	WordPerfect–Colnago–Decca	s.t.

== Stage 2 ==
5 July 1993 — Les Sables-d'Olonne to Vannes, 227.5 km (141.4 mi)

Stage 2 result

Rank	Rider	Team	Time
1	Wilfried Nelissen (BEL)	Histor-Novemail	5h 41' 09"
2	Djamolidine Abdoujaparov (UZB)	Lampre–Polti	s.t.
3	Mario Cipollini (ITA)	GB–MG Maglificio	s.t.
4	Olaf Ludwig (GER)	Team Telekom	s.t.
5	Raúl Alcalá (MEX)	WordPerfect–Colnago–Decca	s.t.
6	Gianni Bugno (ITA)	Gatorade–Mega Drive–Kenwood	s.t.
7	Lance Armstrong (USA)	Motorola	s.t.
8	Mario Kummer (GER)	Team Telekom	+ 3"
9	Jaan Kirsipuu (EST)	Chazal–Vetta–MBK	+ 6"
10	Jan Nevens (BEL)	Lotto	s.t.

General classification after stage 2

Rank	Rider	Team	Time
1	Wilfried Nelissen (BEL)	Histor-Novemail	10h 41' 35"
2	Miguel Indurain (ESP)	Banesto	+ 17"
3	Mario Cipollini (ITA)	GB–MG Maglificio	+ 21"
4	Gianni Bugno (ITA)	Gatorade–Mega Drive–Kenwood	+ 26"
5	Thierry Marie (FRA)	Festina–Lotus	+ 28"
6	Alex Zülle (SUI)	ONCE	+ 29"
7	Laurent Jalabert (FRA)	ONCE	+ 32"
8	Raúl Alcalá (MEX)	WordPerfect–Colnago–Decca	+ 33"
9	Tony Rominger (SUI)	Clas-Cajastur	+ 35"
10	Djamolidine Abdoujaparov (UZB)	Lampre–Polti	+ 36"

== Stage 3 ==
6 July 1993 — Vannes to Dinard, 189.5 km (117.7 mi)

Stage 3 result

Rank	Rider	Team	Time
1	Djamolidine Abdoujaparov (UZB)	Lampre–Polti	4h 41' 53"
2	Wilfried Nelissen (BEL)	Histor-Novemail	s.t.
3	Mario Cipollini (ITA)	GB–MG Maglificio	s.t.
4	Johan Capiot (BEL)	TVM–Bison Kit	s.t.
5	Laurent Jalabert (FRA)	ONCE	s.t.
6	Olaf Ludwig (GER)	Team Telekom	s.t.
7	Stefano Colagè (ITA)	ZG Mobili-Sidi	s.t.
8	Johan Museeuw (BEL)	GB–MG Maglificio	s.t.
9	Christophe Capelle (FRA)	GAN	s.t.
10	Andrea Ferrigato (ITA)	Ariostea	s.t.

General classification after stage 3

Rank	Rider	Team	Time
1	Wilfried Nelissen (BEL)	Histor-Novemail	15h 23' 16"
2	Mario Cipollini (ITA)	GB–MG Maglificio	+ 25"
3	Djamolidine Abdoujaparov (UZB)	Lampre–Polti	+ 28"
4	Miguel Indurain (ESP)	Banesto	+ 29"
5	Gianni Bugno (ITA)	Gatorade–Mega Drive–Kenwood	+ 38"
6	Thierry Marie (FRA)	Festina–Lotus	+ 40"
7	Alex Zülle (SUI)	ONCE	+ 41"
8	Laurent Jalabert (FRA)	ONCE	+ 42"
9	Raúl Alcalá (MEX)	WordPerfect–Colnago–Decca	+ 45"
10	Tony Rominger (SUI)	Clas-Cajastur	+ 47"

== Stage 4 ==
7 July 1993 — Dinard to Avranches, 81 km (50 mi) (TTT)

Stage 4 result

Rank	Team	Time
1	GB–MG Maglificio	1h 34' 10"
2	ONCE	+ 5"
3	Motorola	+ 26"
4	Histor-Novemail	+ 31"
5	Carrera Jeans–Tassoni	+ 37"
6	Team Telekom	+ 1' 21"
7	Banesto	+ 1' 22"
8	Gatorade–Mega Drive–Kenwood	+ 1' 34"
9	Ariostea	+ 1' 36"
10	Lampre–Polti	+ 1' 49"

General classification after stage 4

Rank	Rider	Team	Time
1	Mario Cipollini (ITA)	GB–MG Maglificio	16h 57' 51"
2	Wilfried Nelissen (BEL)	Histor-Novemail	+ 6"
3	Alex Zülle (SUI)	ONCE	+ 21"
4	Laurent Jalabert (FRA)	ONCE	+ 22"
5	Zenon Jaskuła (POL)	GB–MG Maglificio	+ 29"
6	Johan Bruyneel (BEL)	ONCE	+ 39"
7	Erik Breukink (NED)	ONCE	s.t.
8	Philippe Louviot (FRA)	ONCE	+ 52"
9	Johan Museeuw (BEL)	GB–MG Maglificio	+ 58"
10	Franco Ballerini (ITA)	GB–MG Maglificio	+ 1' 05"

== Stage 5 ==
8 July 1993 — Avranches to Évreux, 225.5 km (140.1 mi)

Stage 5 result

Rank	Rider	Team	Time
1	Jesper Skibby (DEN)	TVM–Bison Kit	5h 11' 57"
2	Wilfried Nelissen (BEL)	Histor-Novemail	+ 1"
3	Andrea Ferrigato (ITA)	Ariostea	s.t.
4	Max Sciandri (ITA)	Motorola	s.t.
5	Stefano Colagè (ITA)	ZG Mobili-Sidi	s.t.
6	Olaf Ludwig (GER)	Team Telekom	s.t.
7	Mario Cipollini (ITA)	GB–MG Maglificio	s.t.
8	Davide Cassani (ITA)	Ariostea	s.t.
9	Tony Rominger (SUI)	Clas-Cajastur	s.t.
10	Laurent Jalabert (FRA)	ONCE	s.t.

General classification after stage 5

Rank	Rider	Team	Time
1	Wilfried Nelissen (BEL)	Histor-Novemail	22h 09' 37"
2	Mario Cipollini (ITA)	GB–MG Maglificio	+ 2"
3	Laurent Jalabert (FRA)	ONCE	+ 32"
4	Alex Zülle (SUI)	ONCE	+ 33"
5	Zenon Jaskuła (POL)	GB–MG Maglificio	+ 41"
6	Johan Bruyneel (BEL)	ONCE	+ 51"
7	Erik Breukink (NED)	ONCE	s.t.
8	Philippe Louviot (FRA)	ONCE	+ 1' 04"
9	Johan Museeuw (BEL)	GB–MG Maglificio	+ 1' 10"
10	Franco Ballerini (ITA)	GB–MG Maglificio	+ 1' 17"

== Stage 6 ==
9 July 1993 — Évreux to Amiens, 158 km (98 mi)

Stage 6 result

Rank	Rider	Team	Time
1	Johan Bruyneel (BEL)	ONCE	3h 11' 50"
2	Mario Cipollini (ITA)	GB–MG Maglificio	+ 13"
3	Djamolidine Abdoujaparov (UZB)	Lampre–Polti	s.t.
4	Johan Capiot (BEL)	TVM–Bison Kit	s.t.
5	Christophe Capelle (FRA)	GAN	s.t.
6	Frédéric Moncassin (FRA)	WordPerfect–Colnago–Decca	s.t.
7	Giovanni Fidanza (ITA)	Gatorade–Mega Drive–Kenwood	s.t.
8	Laurent Jalabert (FRA)	ONCE	s.t.
9	Andrea Ferrigato (ITA)	Ariostea	s.t.
10	François Simon (FRA)	Castorama	s.t.

General classification after stage 6

Rank	Rider	Team	Time
1	Mario Cipollini (ITA)	GB–MG Maglificio	25h 21' 28"
2	Wilfried Nelissen (BEL)	Histor-Novemail	+ 12"
3	Johan Bruyneel (BEL)	ONCE	+ 30"
4	Laurent Jalabert (FRA)	ONCE	+ 44"
5	Alex Zülle (SUI)	ONCE	+ 45"
6	Zenon Jaskuła (POL)	GB–MG Maglificio	+ 53"
7	Erik Breukink (NED)	ONCE	+ 1' 03"
8	Philippe Louviot (FRA)	ONCE	+ 1' 16"
9	Steve Bauer (CAN)	Motorola	+ 1' 21"
10	Johan Museeuw (BEL)	GB–MG Maglificio	+ 1' 22"

== Stage 7 ==
10 July 1993 — Péronne to Châlons-sur-Marne, 199 km (124 mi)

Stage 7 result

Rank	Rider	Team	Time
1	Bjarne Riis (DEN)	Ariostea	4h 28' 11"
2	Max Sciandri (ITA)	Motorola	s.t.
3	Johan Museeuw (BEL)	GB–MG Maglificio	s.t.
4	Álvaro Mejía (COL)	Motorola	+ 2"
5	Leonardo Sierra (VEN)	ZG Mobili-Sidi	+ 3"
6	Phil Anderson (AUS)	Motorola	+ 23"
7	Bruno Cenghialta (ITA)	Ariostea	(Note: Cenghialta was classified at 3" after an accident with a motorbike at the finish.)+ 3"
8	Rolf Aldag (GER)	Team Telekom	+ 2' 26"
9	Jean-Pierre Bourgeot (FRA)	Chazal–Vetta–MBK	s.t.
10	Mario Cipollini (ITA)	GB–MG Maglificio	+ 2' 29"

General classification after stage 7

Rank	Rider	Team	Time
1	Johan Museeuw (BEL)	GB–MG Maglificio	29h 50' 41"
2	Álvaro Mejía (COL)	Motorola	+ 39"
3	Bjarne Riis (DEN)	Ariostea	+ 1' 11"
4	Mario Cipollini (ITA)	GB–MG Maglificio	+ 1' 21"
5	Bruno Cenghialta (ITA)	Ariostea	+ 1' 32"
6	Wilfried Nelissen (BEL)	Histor-Novemail	+ 1' 39"
7	Max Sciandri (ITA)	Motorola	+ 1' 49"
8	Johan Bruyneel (BEL)	ONCE	+ 1' 57"
9	Laurent Jalabert (FRA)	ONCE	+ 2' 11"
10	Alex Zülle (SUI)	ONCE	+ 2' 12"

== Stage 8 ==
11 July 1993 — Châlons-sur-Marne to Verdun, 184.5 km (114.6 mi)

Stage 8 result

Rank	Rider	Team	Time
1	Lance Armstrong (USA)	Motorola	4h 22' 23"
2	Raúl Alcalá (MEX)	WordPerfect–Colnago–Decca	s.t.
3	Ronan Pensec (FRA)	Histor-Novemail	s.t.
4	Dominique Arnould (FRA)	Castorama	s.t.
5	Giancarlo Perini (ITA)	ZG Mobili-Sidi	s.t.
6	Stephen Roche (IRL)	Carrera Jeans–Tassoni	+ 1"
7	Mario Cipollini (ITA)	GB–MG Maglificio	+ 14"
8	Frédéric Moncassin (FRA)	WordPerfect–Colnago–Decca	s.t.
9	Christophe Capelle (FRA)	GAN	s.t.
10	Steve Bauer (CAN)	Motorola	s.t.

General classification after stage 8

Rank	Rider	Team	Time
1	Johan Museeuw (BEL)	GB–MG Maglificio	34h 13' 18"
2	Álvaro Mejía (COL)	Motorola	+ 39"
3	Mario Cipollini (ITA)	GB–MG Maglificio	+ 1' 07"
4	Bjarne Riis (DEN)	Ariostea	+ 1' 11"
5	Bruno Cenghialta (ITA)	Ariostea	+ 1' 32"
6	Wilfried Nelissen (BEL)	Histor-Novemail	+ 1' 35"
7	Max Sciandri (ITA)	Motorola	+ 1' 49"
8	Johan Bruyneel (BEL)	ONCE	+ 1' 57"
9	Laurent Jalabert (FRA)	ONCE	+ 2' 11"
10	Zenon Jaskuła (POL)	GB–MG Maglificio	+ 2' 20"

== Stage 9 ==
12 July 1993 — Lac de Madine, 59 km (37 mi) (ITT)

Stage 9 result

Rank	Rider	Team	Time
1	Miguel Indurain (ESP)	Banesto	1h 12' 50"
2	Gianni Bugno (ITA)	Gatorade–Mega Drive–Kenwood	+ 2' 11"
3	Erik Breukink (NED)	ONCE	+ 2' 22"
4	Tony Rominger (SUI)	Clas-Cajastur	+ 2' 42"
5	Alex Zülle (SUI)	ONCE	+ 3' 18"
6	Johan Bruyneel (BEL)	ONCE	+ 3' 50"
7	Zenon Jaskuła (POL)	GB–MG Maglificio	+ 4' 00"
8	Raúl Alcalá (MEX)	WordPerfect–Colnago–Decca	+ 4' 05"
9	Philippe Louviot (FRA)	ONCE	+ 4' 28"
10	Stephen Roche (IRL)	Carrera Jeans–Tassoni	+ 4' 30"

General classification after stage 9

Rank	Rider	Team	Time
1	Miguel Indurain (ESP)	Banesto	35h 29' 35"
2	Erik Breukink (NED)	ONCE	+ 1' 35"
3	Johan Bruyneel (BEL)	ONCE	+ 2' 30"
4	Gianni Bugno (ITA)	Gatorade–Mega Drive–Kenwood	+ 2' 32"
5	Bjarne Riis (DEN)	Ariostea	+ 2' 34"
6	Johan Museeuw (BEL)	GB–MG Maglificio	+ 3' 02"
7	Zenon Jaskuła (POL)	GB–MG Maglificio	+ 3' 03"
8	Álvaro Mejía (COL)	Motorola	+ 3' 08"
9	Philippe Louviot (FRA)	ONCE	+ 3' 54"
10	Stephen Roche (IRL)	Carrera Jeans–Tassoni	+ 4' 10"

== Stage 10 ==
14 July 1993 — Villard-de-Lans to Serre Chevalier, 203 km (126 mi)

Stage 10 result

Rank	Rider	Team	Time
1	Tony Rominger (SUI)	Clas-Cajastur	5h 28' 52"
2	Álvaro Mejía (COL)	Motorola	s.t.
3	Miguel Indurain (ESP)	Banesto	s.t.
4	Andrew Hampsten (USA)	Motorola	+ 1' 13"
5	Zenon Jaskuła (POL)	GB–MG Maglificio	s.t.
6	Erik Breukink (NED)	ONCE	+ 3' 32"
7	Oliverio Rincón (COL)	Amaya Seguros	s.t.
8	Richard Virenque (FRA)	Festina–Lotus	+ 4' 35"
9	Roberto Conti (ITA)	Ariostea	s.t.
10	Francisco Javier Mauleón (ESP)	Clas-Cajastur	s.t.

General classification after stage 10

Rank	Rider	Team	Time
1	Miguel Indurain (ESP)	Banesto	40h 58' 17"
2	Álvaro Mejía (COL)	Motorola	+ 3' 08"
3	Zenon Jaskuła (POL)	GB–MG Maglificio	+ 4' 16"
4	Erik Breukink (NED)	ONCE	+ 5' 07"
5	Tony Rominger (SUI)	Clas-Cajastur	+ 5' 44"
6	Andrew Hampsten (USA)	Motorola	+ 8' 06"
7	Charly Mottet (FRA)	Histor-Novemail	+ 9' 44"
8	Bjarne Riis (DEN)	Ariostea	+ 9' 55"
9	Gianni Bugno (ITA)	Gatorade–Mega Drive–Kenwood	+ 10' 14"
10	Alex Zülle (SUI)	ONCE	+ 11' 09"
