= Steven Van Vooren =

Belgian cyclist

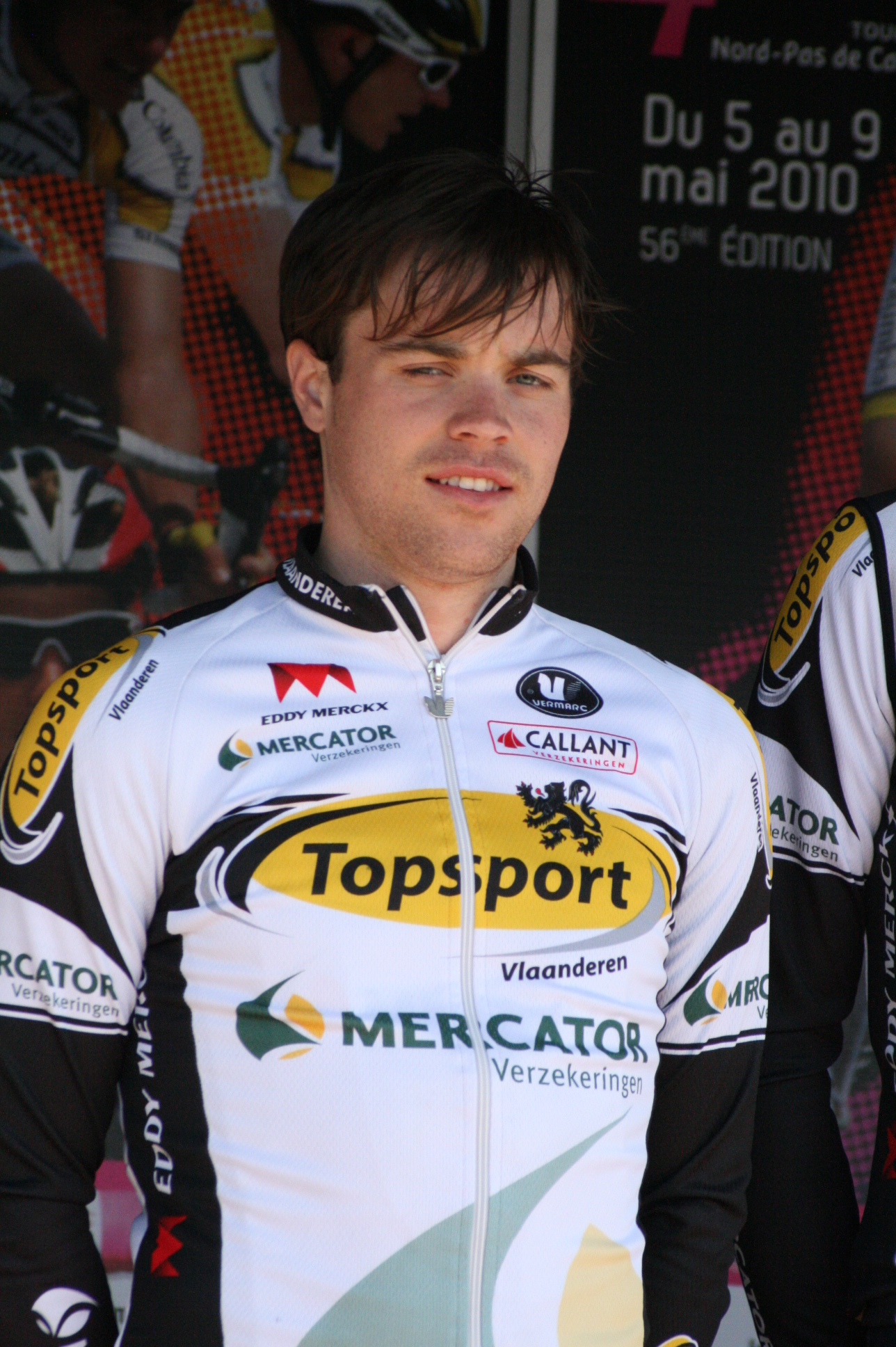

Personal information
- Born: 5 October 1986 (age 40) Ghent, Belgium

Cycling career
- Sport: Cycling
- Current team: Retired
- Discipline: Road
- Role: Rider

Amateur team
- 2008: Johan Bruyneel Cycling Academy

Professional teams
- 2009: An Post–Sean Kelly
- 2010–2012: Topsport Vlaanderen–Mercator
- 2013: An Post–ChainReaction

Steven Van Vooren (born 5 October 1986) is a Belgian racing cyclist.

== Palmarès ==
2008
1st Stage 1a Tour of Pennsylvania
2009
1st Ronde de l'Oise
