= 1992 Vuelta a Murcia =

Race details
- Dates: 10–15 March 1992
- Stages: 6
- Distance: 783.4 km (486.8 mi)
- Winning time: 19h 43' 59"

Results
	Winner	Alvaro Mejia (COL)
	Second	Antonio Martín (ESP)
	Third	Melcior Mauri (ESP)

The 1992 Vuelta a Murcia was the eighth edition of the Vuelta a Murcia cycle race and was held on 10 March to 15 March 1992. The race started in Molina de Segura and finished in Murcia. The race was won by Alvaro Mejia.

== General classification ==
Final general classification

Rank	Rider	Time
1	Alvaro Mejia (COL)	19h 43' 59"
2	Antonio Martín (ESP)	+ 10"
3	Melcior Mauri (ESP)	+ 13"
4	Juan Martínez Oliver (ESP)	+ 15"
5	Artūras Kasputis (LTU)	+ 28"
6	Laudelino Cubino (ESP)	+ 32"
7	Dimitri Zhdanov (RUS)	+ 32"
8	José Luis Villanueva (ESP)	+ 33"
9	Nico Verhoeven (NED)	+ 37"
10	Remigijus Lupeikis (LTU)	+ 37"
