= 1992 Volta a Catalunya =

Race details
- Dates: 8–14 June 1992
- Stages: 7
- Distance: 943 km (586.0 mi)
- Winning time: 24h 29' 40"

Results
	Winner	Miguel Induráin (ESP)	(Banesto)
	Second	Tony Rominger (SUI)	(CLAS–Cajastur)
	Third	Antonio Martín (ESP)	(Amaya Seguros)
	Points	Laurent Jalabert (FRA)	(ONCE)
	Mountains	Tony Rominger (SUI)	(CLAS–Cajastur)
	Sprints	Álvaro González de Galdeano (ESP)	(Artiach–Royal)
	Team	Banesto	

The 1992 Volta a Catalunya was the 72nd edition of the Volta a Catalunya cycle race and was held from 8 June to 14 June 1992. The race started in Sant Carles de la Ràpita and finished in Sant Feliu de Guíxols. The race was won by Miguel Induráin of the Banesto team.

== General classification ==
Final general classification

Rank	Rider	Team	Time
1	Miguel Induráin (ESP)	Banesto	24h 29' 40"
2	Tony Rominger (SUI)	CLAS–Cajastur	+ 19"
3	Antonio Martín (ESP)	Amaya Seguros	+ 1' 18"
4	Erik Breukink (NED)	PDM–Ultima–Concorde	+ 1' 27"
5	Jean-François Bernard (FRA)	Banesto	+ 1' 47"
6	Federico Echave (ESP)	CLAS–Cajastur	+ 1' 51"
7	Mikel Zarrabeitia (ESP)	Amaya Seguros	+ 2' 22"
8	Charly Mottet (FRA)	RMO	+ 2' 52"
9	Johan Bruyneel (BEL)	ONCE	+ 2' 58"
10	Pedro Delgado (ESP)	Banesto	+ 3' 20"
