= 1993 Tour de France =

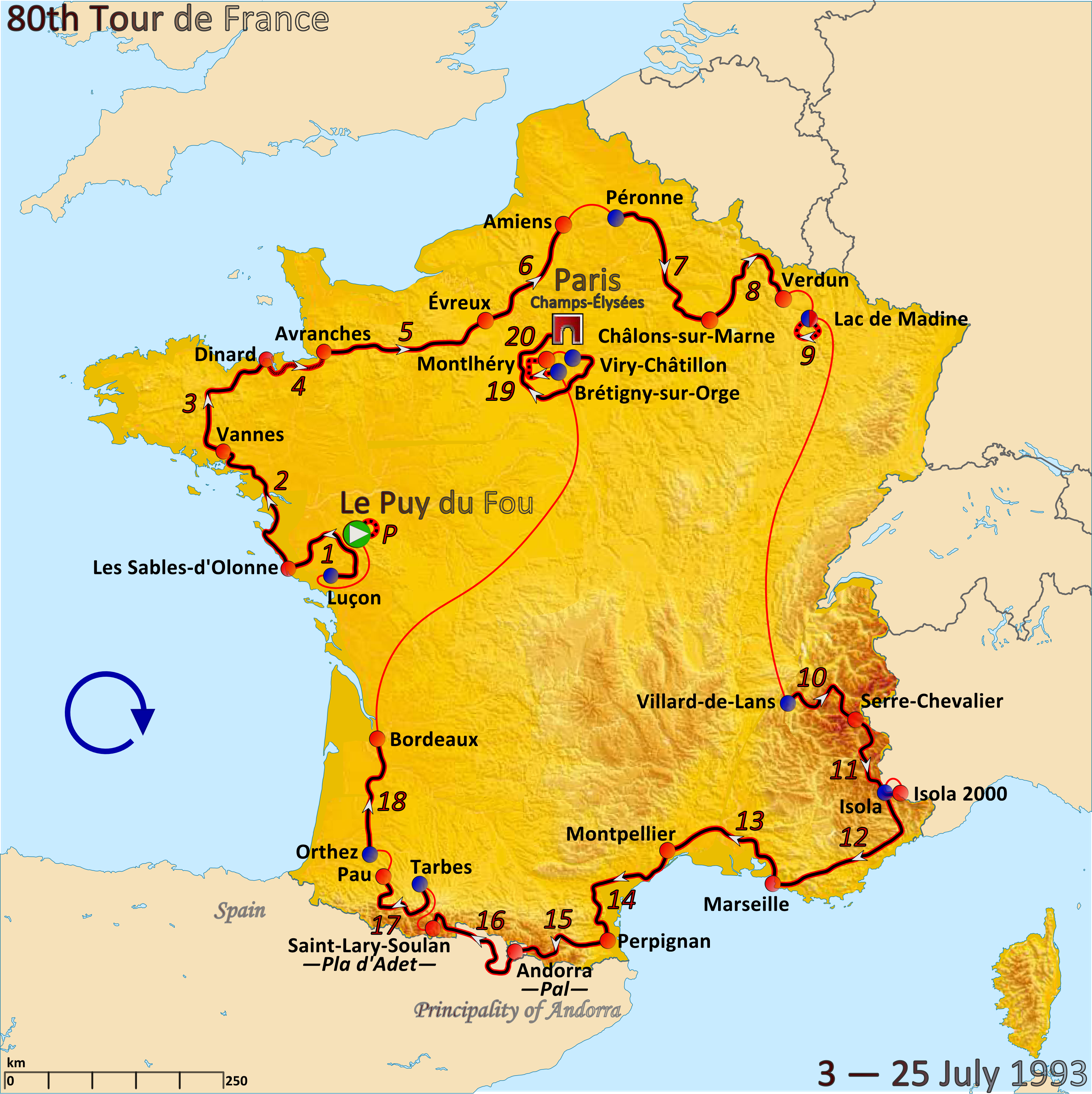
- Route of the 1993 Tour de France

Race details
- Dates: 3–25 July 1993
- Stages: 20 + Prologue
- Distance: 3,714 km (2,308 mi)
- Winning time: 95h 57' 09"

Results
Jersey awarded to the overall winner	Winner	Miguel Induráin (ESP)	(Banesto)
	Second	Tony Rominger (SUI)	(CLAS–Cajastur)
	Third	Zenon Jaskuła (POL)	(GB–MG Maglificio)
Jersey awarded to the points classification winner	Points	Djamolidine Abdoujaparov (UZB)	(Lampre–Polti)
Jersey awarded to the mountains classification winner	Mountains	Tony Rominger (SUI)	(CLAS–Cajastur)
	Young rider	Antonio Martín (ESP)	(Amaya Seguros)
	Combativity	Massimo Ghirotto (ITA)	(ZG Mobili)
	Team	Carrera Jeans–Tassoni	

The 1993 Tour de France was the 80th edition of the Tour de France, taking place between July 3-25, 1993. It consisted of 20 stages, over a distance of 3,714 km (2,308 mi).

The winner of the previous two years, Miguel Induráin, successfully defended his title. The points classification was won by Djamolidine Abdoujaparov, while the mountains classification was won by Tony Rominger.

== Teams ==
The organisers of the Tour, Amaury Sport Organisation (ASO), felt that it was no longer safe to have 198 cyclists in the race, as more and more traffic islands had been made, so the total number of teams was reduced from 22 to 20, composing of 9 cyclists each. The first 14 teams were selected in May 1993, based on their FICP ranking. In June 1993, six additional wildcards were given, one of which was given to a combination of two teams, Chazal–Vetta–MBK and Subaru. The Subaru team did not want to be part of a mixed team, so Chazal was allowed to send a full team.

The teams entering the race were:

Qualified teams

- Ariostea
- Banesto
- Carrera Jeans–Tassoni
- Castorama
- CLAS–Cajastur
- Festina–Lotus
- Gatorade–Mega Drive–Kenwood
- GB–MG Maglificio
- Lampre–Polti
- Motorola
- Novemail–Histor–Laser Computer
- ONCE
- Team Telekom
- WordPerfect–Colnago–Decca

Invited teams

- Amaya Seguros
- Chazal–Vetta–MBK
- GAN
- Lotto
- TVM–Bison Kit
- ZG Mobili

== Pre-race favourites ==
The defending champion Miguel Induráin was the big favourite, having won the 1993 Giro d'Italia earlier that year.

== Route and stages ==
The route was unveiled in October 1992. Most team directors expected it to be more difficult than the 1992 Tour de France. The highest point of elevation in the race was 2,802 m (9,193 ft) at the Cime de la Bonette loop road on stage 11.

Stage characteristics and winners
Stage	Date	Course	Distance	Type	Winner
P	3 July	Le Puy du Fou	6.8 km (4.2 mi)	Individual time trial	Miguel Induráin (ESP)
1	4 July	Luçon to Les Sables-d'Olonne	215.0 km (133.6 mi)	Plain stage	Mario Cipollini (ITA)
2	5 July	Les Sables-d'Olonne to Vannes	227.5 km (141.4 mi)	Plain stage	Wilfried Nelissen (BEL)
3	6 July	Vannes to Dinard	189.5 km (117.7 mi)	Plain stage	Djamolidine Abdoujaparov (UZB)
4	7 July	Dinard to Avranches	81.0 km (50.3 mi)	Team time trial	(Italy) GB–MG Maglificio
5	8 July	Avranches to Évreux	225.5 km (140.1 mi)	Plain stage	Jesper Skibby (DEN)
6	9 July	Évreux to Amiens	158.0 km (98.2 mi)	Plain stage	Johan Bruyneel (BEL)
7	10 July	Péronne to Châlons-sur-Marne	199.0 km (123.7 mi)	Plain stage	Bjarne Riis (DEN)
8	11 July	Châlons-sur-Marne to Verdun	184.5 km (114.6 mi)	Plain stage	Lance Armstrong (USA)
9	12 July	Lac de Madine	59.0 km (36.7 mi)	Individual time trial	Miguel Induráin (ESP)
	13 July	Villard-de-Lans		Rest day	
10	14 July	Villard-de-Lans to Serre Chevalier	203.0 km (126.1 mi)	Stage with mountain(s)	Tony Rominger (SUI)
11	15 July	Serre Chevalier to Isola 2000	179.0 km (111.2 mi)	Stage with mountain(s)	Tony Rominger (SUI)
12	16 July	Isola to Marseille	286.5 km (178.0 mi)	Plain stage	Fabio Roscioli (ITA)
13	17 July	Marseille to Montpellier	181.5 km (112.8 mi)	Plain stage	Olaf Ludwig (GER)
14	18 July	Montpellier to Perpignan	223.0 km (138.6 mi)	Plain stage	Pascal Lino (FRA)
15	19 July	Perpignan to Pal	231.5 km (143.8 mi)	Stage with mountain(s)	Oliverio Rincón (COL)
	20 July	Andorra		Rest day	
16	21 July	Andorra to Saint-Lary-Soulan Pla d'Adet	230.0 km (142.9 mi)	Stage with mountain(s)	Zenon Jaskuła (POL)
17	22 July	Tarbes to Pau	190.0 km (118.1 mi)	Stage with mountain(s)	Claudio Chiappucci (ITA)
18	23 July	Orthez to Bordeaux	199.5 km (124.0 mi)	Plain stage	Djamolidine Abdoujaparov (UZB)
19	24 July	Brétigny-sur-Orge to Montlhéry	48.0 km (29.8 mi)	Individual time trial	Tony Rominger (SUI)
20	25 July	Viry-Châtillon to Paris (Champs-Élysées)	196.5 km (122.1 mi)	Plain stage	Djamolidine Abdoujaparov (UZB)
	Total		3,714 km (2,308 mi)		

== Race overview ==
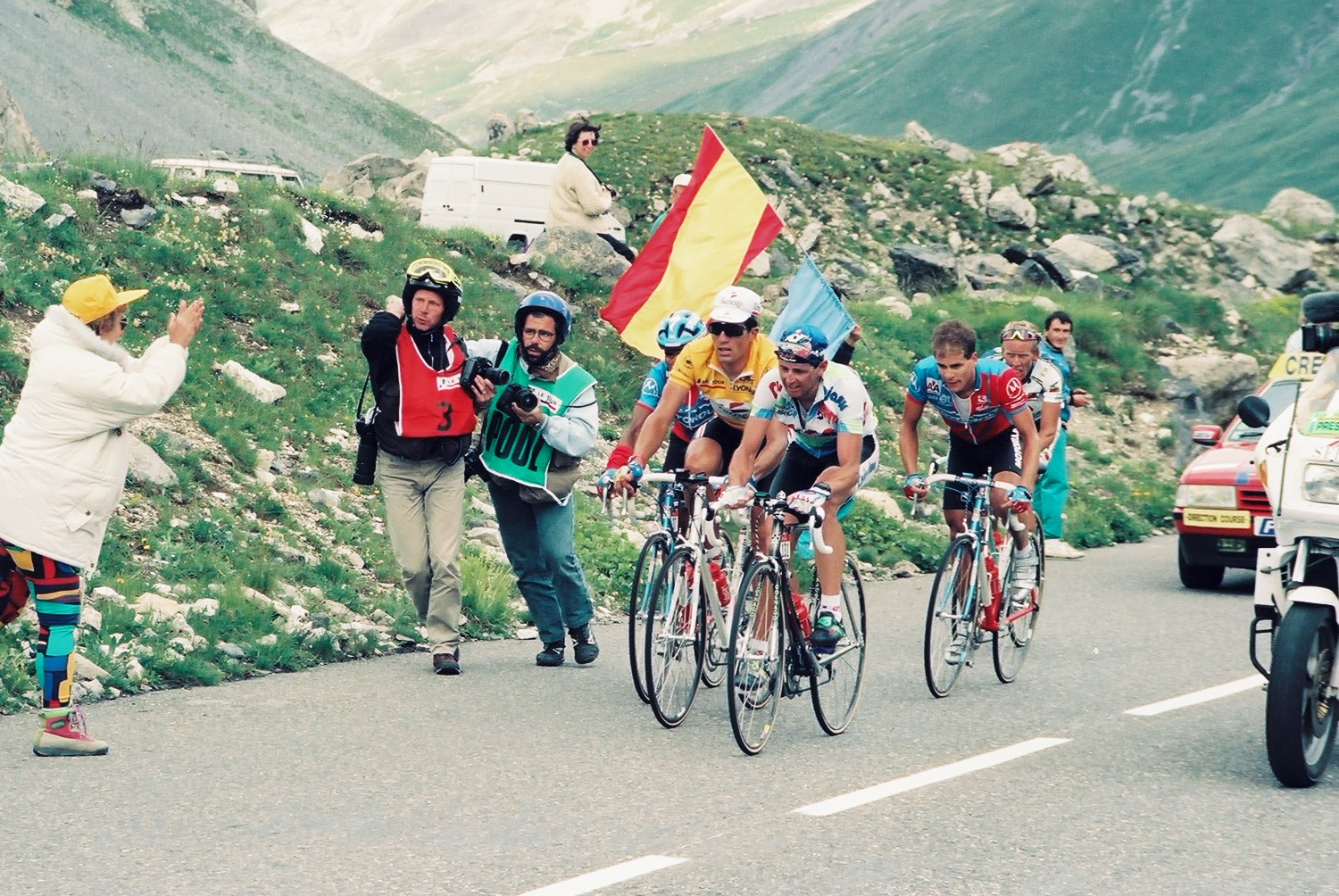
The group containing Miguel Induráin, wearing the yellow jersey as leader of the general classification, on the Col du Galibier in stage ten

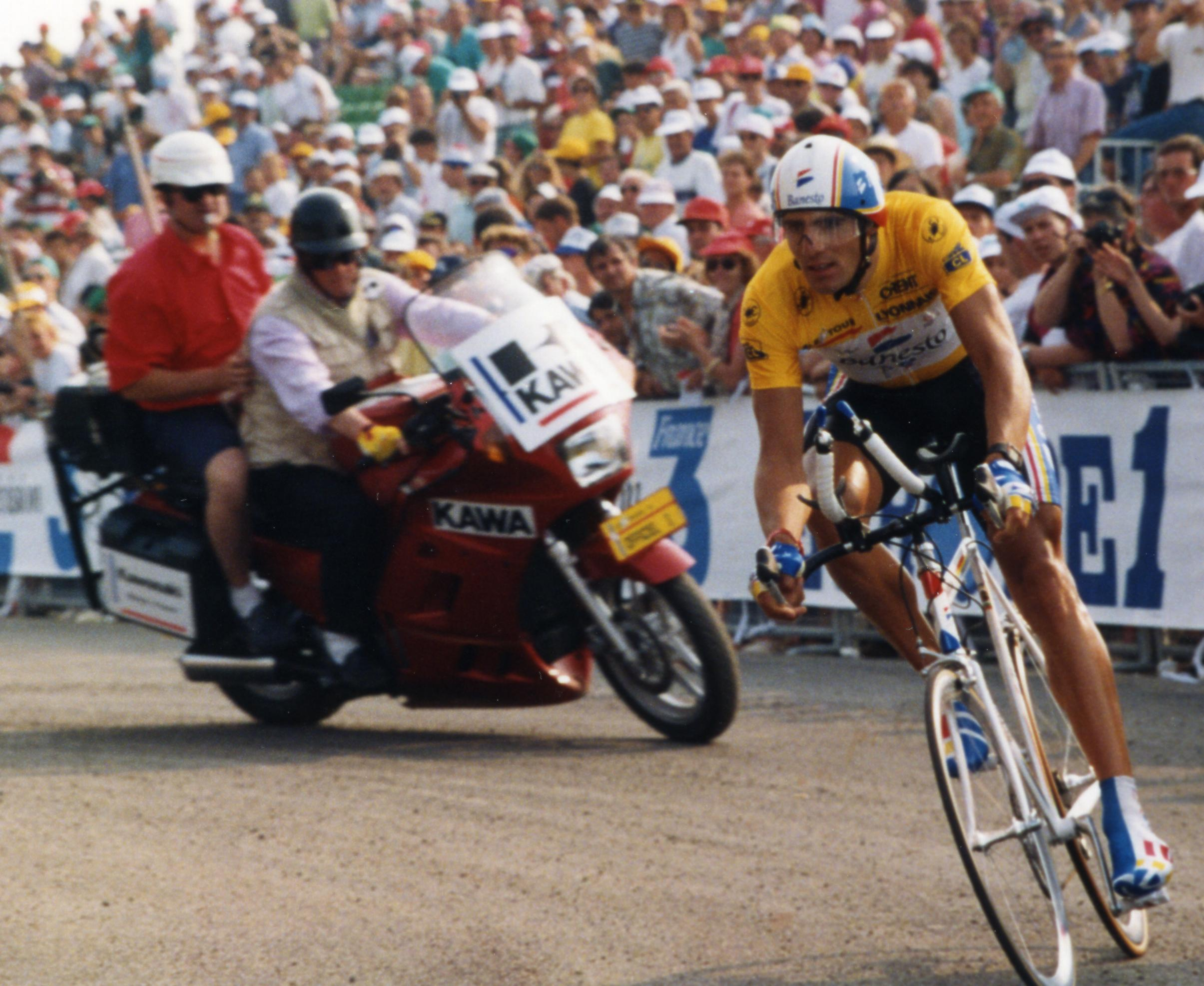
Miguel Induráin in the penultimate stage's individual time trial

The 1993 Tour started in the same way as the 1992 Tour: Indurain won, with Alex Zülle coming in second place. The next stages were flat, and all finished in mass sprints. After the second stage, sprinter Wilfried Nelissen had collected enough time bonuses to become leader in the general classification.

The team time trial in stage four was the first stage with significant effects on the general classification. Banesto (Indurain's team) came in seventh, losing more than one minute, but the biggest loser was Tony Rominger, whose Clas team lost more than three minutes.

The contenders for the overall victory saved their energy in the next few stages, and cyclists who would not be a threat in the mountains were allowed to break away, with only the sprinters' teams trying to get them back. The sixth stage was run at an average speed of almost 49.5 kilometres per hour (30.8 mph), at that moment the fastest mass-start stage in the Tour.

In the ninth stage, an individual time trial, the general classification changed. Indurain was a lot faster than the other cyclists, winning the stage with a margin of more than two minutes, and became the new leader in the general classification.

The next stages were in the Alps. Tony Rominger attacked, trying to win back time. Although he was able to win the stage, Indurain had followed him closely, so Rominger did not win back any time. Other pre-race favourites lost considerable time at this stage and were no longer in contention, such as Claudio Chiappucci, who lost more than eight minutes.

In the eleventh stage, Rominger tried it again. But again, Indurain stayed with him. Rominger won the stage once again, but the margin to Indurain stayed the same. Rominger did jump to fourth place in the general classification, because Erik Breukink lost almost ten minutes.

The next three stages were relatively flat, and the top of the general classification stayed the same. In the fifteenth stage, Pyrenean climbs were included. The stage was won by Oliverio Rincón, the only survivor of an early breakaway. Behind him, Rominger again tried to get away from Indurain, but was unable to do so.

In the sixteenth stage, again in the Pyrenées, Rominger was finally able to get away from Indurain, but the margin was only three seconds. The seventeenth stage was the last stage with serious climbs, so the last realistic opportunity to win back time on Indurain, but this did not happen, which indicated that Indurain would become the winner.

The rest of the podium was determined in the individual time trial in stage 19. It was won by Rominger, with Indurain in second place. Rominger thus climbed to the second place in the general classification.

== Classification leadership and minor prizes ==
There were several classifications in the 1993 Tour de France. The most important was the general classification, calculated by adding each cyclist's finishing times on each stage. The cyclist with the least accumulated time was the race leader, identified by the yellow jersey; the winner of this classification is considered the winner of the Tour.

Additionally, there was a points classification, which awarded a green jersey. In the points classification, cyclists got points for finishing among the best in a stage finish, or in intermediate sprints. The cyclist with the most points lead the classification, and was identified with a green jersey.

There was also a mountains classification. The organisation had categorised some climbs as either hors catégorie, first, second, third, or fourth-category; points for this classification were won by the first cyclists that reached the top of these climbs first, with more points available for the higher-categorised climbs. The cyclist with the most points lead the classification, and wore a white jersey with red polka dots.

The fourth individual classification was the young rider classification, which was not marked by a jersey. This was decided the same way as the general classification, but only riders under 26 years were eligible.

For the team classification, the times of the best three cyclists per team on each stage were added; the leading team was the team with the lowest total time.

In addition, there was a combativity award given after each mass-start stage to the cyclist considered most combative. The decision was made by a jury composed of journalists who gave points. The cyclist with the most points from votes in all stages led the combativity classification. Massimo Ghirotto won this classification, and was given overall the super-combativity award. The Souvenir Henri Desgrange was given in honour of Tour founder Henri Desgrange to the first rider to pass the summit of the Col du Galibier on stage 10. This prize was won by Tony Rominger. The fair-play award was given to Gianni Bugno.

Classification leadership by stage
Stage	Winner	General classification	Points classification	Mountains classification	Young rider classification (Note: A white jersey was not awarded to the leader of the young rider classification between 1989 and 1999.)	Team classification	Combativity	
Stage	Winner	General classification	Points classification	Mountains classification	Young rider classification	Team classification	Award	Classification
P	Miguel Induráin	Miguel Induráin	Miguel Induráin	François Simon	Alex Zülle	ONCE	no award	
1	Mario Cipollini	Miguel Induráin	Mario Cipollini	François Simon	Alex Zülle	ONCE	Massimo Ghirotto	Massimo Ghirotto
2	Wilfried Nelissen	Wilfried Nelissen	Wilfried Nelissen	François Simon	Wilfried Nelissen	ONCE	Ján Svorada	Ján Svorada
3	Djamolidine Abdoujaparov	Wilfried Nelissen	Wilfried Nelissen	Laurent Desbiens	Wilfried Nelissen	ONCE	Laurent Desbiens	Laurent Desbiens
4	GB–MG Maglificio	Mario Cipollini	Wilfried Nelissen	Laurent Desbiens	Wilfried Nelissen	ONCE	no award	Laurent Desbiens
5	Jesper Skibby	Wilfried Nelissen	Wilfried Nelissen	Davide Cassani	Wilfried Nelissen	ONCE	Bjarne Riis	
6	Johan Bruyneel	Mario Cipollini	Wilfried Nelissen	Davide Cassani	Wilfried Nelissen	ONCE	Jacky Durand	
7	Bjarne Riis	Johan Museeuw	Mario Cipollini	Bjarne Riis	Wilfried Nelissen	Motorola	Bjarne Riis	Bjarne Riis
8	Lance Armstrong	Johan Museeuw	Mario Cipollini	Davide Cassani	Wilfried Nelissen	Motorola	Pascal Lance	Bjarne Riis
9	Miguel Induráin	Miguel Induráin	Mario Cipollini	Davide Cassani	Alex Zülle	ONCE	no award	Bjarne Riis
10	Tony Rominger	Miguel Induráin	Mario Cipollini	Davide Cassani	Alex Zülle	ONCE	Tony Rominger	Bjarne Riis
11	Tony Rominger	Miguel Induráin	Djamolidine Abdoujaparov	Tony Rominger	Oliverio Rincón	Ariostea	Davide Cassani	Bjarne Riis
12	Fabio Roscioli	Miguel Induráin	Djamolidine Abdoujaparov	Tony Rominger	Oliverio Rincón	Carrera Jeans–Tassoni	Fabio Roscioli	Bjarne Riis
13	Olaf Ludwig	Miguel Induráin	Djamolidine Abdoujaparov	Tony Rominger	Oliverio Rincón	Carrera Jeans–Tassoni	Jacky Durand	Bjarne Riis
14	Pascal Lino	Miguel Induráin	Djamolidine Abdoujaparov	Tony Rominger	Oliverio Rincón	Carrera Jeans–Tassoni	Giancarlo Perini	Bjarne Riis
15	Oliverio Rincón	Miguel Induráin	Djamolidine Abdoujaparov	Tony Rominger	Oliverio Rincón	Carrera Jeans–Tassoni	Richard Virenque	Bjarne Riis
16	Zenon Jaskuła	Miguel Induráin	Djamolidine Abdoujaparov	Tony Rominger	Antonio Martín	Carrera Jeans–Tassoni	Claudio Chiappucci	Bjarne Riis
17	Claudio Chiappucci	Miguel Induráin	Djamolidine Abdoujaparov	Tony Rominger	Antonio Martín	Carrera Jeans–Tassoni	Claudio Chiappucci	Bjarne Riis
18	Djamolidine Abdoujaparov	Miguel Induráin	Djamolidine Abdoujaparov	Tony Rominger	Antonio Martín	Carrera Jeans–Tassoni	Michel Vermote	Massimo Ghirotto
19	Tony Rominger	Miguel Induráin	Djamolidine Abdoujaparov	Tony Rominger	Antonio Martín	Carrera Jeans–Tassoni	no award	Massimo Ghirotto
20	Djamolidine Abdoujaparov	Miguel Induráin	Djamolidine Abdoujaparov	Tony Rominger	Antonio Martín	Carrera Jeans–Tassoni	Rolf Sørensen	Massimo Ghirotto
Final		Miguel Induráin	Djamolidine Abdoujaparov	Tony Rominger	Antonio Martín	Carrera Jeans–Tassoni	Massimo Ghirotto	

- In stage 1, Alex Zülle wore the green jersey.
- In stages 3, 4, and 6, Mario Cipollini wore the green jersey.

== Final standings ==
Legend
A yellow jersey.	Denotes the winner of the general classification	A green jersey.	Denotes the winner of the points classification
A white jersey with red polka dots.	Denotes the winner of the mountains classification		

=== General classification ===
Final general classification (1–10)
Rank	Rider	Team	Time
1	Miguel Induráin (ESP)	Banesto	95h 57' 09"
2	Toni Rominger (SUI)	CLAS–Cajastur	+ 4' 59"
3	Zenon Jaskuła (POL)	GB–MG Maglificio	+ 5' 48"
4	Alvaro Mejia (COL)	Motorola	+ 7' 29"
5	Bjarne Riis (DEN) Note: Later admitted doping.	Ariostea	+ 16' 26"
6	Claudio Chiappucci (ITA)	Carrera Jeans–Tassoni	+ 17' 18"
7	Johan Bruyneel (BEL)	ONCE	+ 18' 04"
8	Andrew Hampsten (USA)	Motorola	+ 20' 14"
9	Pedro Delgado (ESP)	Banesto	+ 23' 57"
10	Vladimir Poulnikov (UKR)	Carrera Jeans–Tassoni	+ 25' 29"

Final general classification (11–136)
Rank	Rider	Team	Time
11	Gianni Faresin (ITA)	ZG Mobili	+ 29' 05"
12	Antonio Martín (ESP)	Amaya Seguros	+ 29' 51"
13	Stephen Roche (IRE)	Carrera Jeans–Tassoni	+ 29' 53"
14	Roberto Conti (ITA)	Ariostea	+ 30' 05"
15	Jean-Philippe Dojwa (FRA)	Festina–Lotus	+ 30' 24"
16	Oliviero Rincón (COL)	Amaya Seguros	+ 33' 19"
17	Alberto Elli (ITA)	Ariostea	+ 33' 29"
18	Jon Unzaga (ESP)	CLAS–Cajastur	+ 38' 09"
19	Richard Virenque (FRA)	Festina–Lotus	+ 38' 12"
20	Gianni Bugno (ITA)	Gatorade–Mega Drive–Kenwood	+ 40' 08"
21	Franco Vona (ITA)	GB–MG Maglificio	+ 40' 39"
22	Laurent Madouas (FRA)	Castorama	+ 41' 26"
23	Federico Echave (ESP)	CLAS–Cajastur	+ 42' 25"
24	Robert Millar (GBR)	TVM–Bison Kit	+ 44' 20"
25	Udo Bölts (GER)	Team Telekom	+ 44' 35"
26	Francisco Mauleón (ESP)	CLAS–Cajastur	+ 45' 18"
27	Raúl Alcalá (MEX)	WordPerfect–Colnago–Decca	+ 47' 40"
28	Thierry Claveyrolat (FRA)	GAN	+ 49' 21"
29	Giancarlo Perini (ITA)	ZG Mobili	+ 52' 02"
30	Fernando Escartín (ESP)	CLAS–Cajastur	+ 53' 09"
31	Bo Hamburger (DEN)	TVM–Bison Kit	+ 53' 42"
32	Ramon González (ESP)	Festina–Lotus	+ 57' 57"
33	Massimo Ghirotto (ITA)	ZG Mobili	+ 1h 00' 15"
34	Leonardo Sierra (VEN)	ZG Mobili	+ 1h 01' 35"
35	Viatcheslav Ekimov (RUS)	Novemail–Histor–Laser Computer	+ 1h 06' 43"
36	Thierry Bourguignon (FRA)	Castorama	+ 1h 08' 56"
37	Éric Caritoux (FRA)	Chazal–Vetta–MBK	+ 1h 13' 57"
38	Bruno Cenghialta (ITA)	Ariostea	+ 1h 14' 46"
39	Dimitri Zhdanov (RUS)	Novemail–Histor–Laser Computer	+ 1h 15' 17"
40	Charly Mottet (FRA)	Novemail–Histor–Laser Computer	+ 1h 16' 15"
41	Alex Zülle (SUI)	ONCE	+ 1h 18' 58"
42	Laudelino Cubino (ESP)	Amaya Seguros	+ 1h 19' 26"
43	Pascal Lino (FRA)	Festina–Lotus	+ 1h 19' 53"
44	Laurent Brochard (FRA)	Castorama	+ 1h 20' 17"
45	Eddy Bouwmans (NED)	Novemail–Histor–Laser Computer	+ 1h 23' 12"
46	Gérard Rué (FRA)	Banesto	+ 1h 25' 34"
47	Ronan Pensec (FRA)	Novemail–Histor–Laser Computer	+ 1h 33' 35"
48	Bruno Cornillet (FRA)	Novemail–Histor–Laser Computer	+ 1h 34' 04"
49	Jean-François Bernard (FRA)	Banesto	+ 1h 34' 48"
50	Johan Museeuw (BEL)	GB–MG Maglificio	+ 1h 35' 45"
51	Flavio Vanzella (ITA)	GB–MG Maglificio	+ 1h 35' 50"
52	Jörg Müller (SUI)	CLAS–Cajastur	+ 1h 36' 37"
53	Jesper Skibby (DEN)	TVM–Bison Kit	+ 1h 36' 43"
54	Rolf Järmann (SUI)	Ariostea	+ 1h 37' 23"
55	Gerrit de Vries (NED)	TVM–Bison Kit	+ 1h 37' 24"
56	Rolf Aldag (GER)	Team Telekom	+ 1h 37' 36"
57	François Simon (FRA)	Castorama	+ 1h 41' 23"
58	Miguel Angel Martinez (ESP)	ONCE	+ 1h 43' 03"
59	François Lemarchand (FRA)	GAN	+ 1h 43' 20"
60	Stefano Colagè (ITA)	ZG Mobili	+ 1h 47' 08"
61	Franco Ballerini (ITA)	GB–MG Maglificio	+ 1h 49' 25"
62	Jens Heppner (GER)	Team Telekom	+ 1h 51' 32"
63	Éric Boyer (FRA)	GAN	+ 1h 52' 12"
64	Philippe Louviot (FRA)	ONCE	+ 1h 52' 19"
65	Mauro-Antonio Santaromita (ITA)	Ariostea	+ 1h 52' 24"
66	Laurent Pillon (FRA)	GB–MG Maglificio	+ 1h 52' 42"
67	Guy Nulens (BEL)	Novemail–Histor–Laser Computer	+ 1h 53' 40"
68	Pascal Lance (FRA)	GAN	+ 1h 54' 43"
69	Marc Sergeant (BEL)	Novemail–Histor–Laser Computer	+ 1h 55' 21"
70	Rolf Sørensen (DEN)	Carrera Jeans–Tassoni	+ 1h 56' 50"
71	Maximilian Sciandri (GBR)	Motorola	+ 1h 57' 14"
72	Marino Alonso (ESP)	Banesto	+ 1h 58' 04"
73	Gianluca Bortolami (ITA)	Lampre–Polti	+ 1h 59' 14"
74	Julián Gorospe (ESP)	Banesto	+ 2h 00' 22"
75	Pascal Chanteur (FRA)	Chazal–Vetta–MBK	+ 2h 00' 42"
76	Djamolidine Abduzhaparov (UZB)	Lampre–Polti	+ 2h 03' 33"
77	Brian Holm (DEN)	Team Telekom	+ 2h 04' 55"
78	Iñaki Gastón (ESP)	CLAS–Cajastur	+ 2h 05' 32"
79	Fabian Jeker (SUI)	Castorama	+ 2h 07' 12"
80	John van den Akker (NED)	ZG Mobili	+ 2h 07' 17"
81	Dominique Arnould (FRA)	Castorama	+ 2h 07' 40"
82	Juan Carlos Martín (ESP)	Amaya Seguros	+ 2h 08' 53"
83	Luc Roosen (BEL)	Lotto	+ 2h 09' 16"
84	Phil Anderson (AUS)	Motorola	+ 2h 10' 45"
85	Fabio Roscioli (ITA)	Carrera Jeans–Tassoni	+ 2h 11' 31"
86	Wilfried Peeters (BEL)	GB–MG Maglificio	+ 2h 11' 55"
87	Christian Henn (GER)	Team Telekom	+ 2h 12' 13"
88	Sean Yates (GBR)	Motorola	+ 2h 16' 38"
89	Frankie Andreu (USA)	Motorola	+ 2h 17' 10"
90	Dag Otto Lauritzen (NOR)	TVM–Bison Kit	+ 2h 17' 40"
91	Maarten den Bakker (NED)	TVM–Bison Kit	+ 2h 18' 32"
92	Mario Chiesa (ITA)	Carrera Jeans–Tassoni	+ 2h 18' 42"
93	Franck Pineau (FRA)	Chazal–Vetta–MBK	+ 2h 18' 55"
94	José Ramon Uriarte (ESP)	Banesto	+ 2h 19' 44"
95	Javier Murguialday (ESP)	Amaya Seguros	+ 2h 19' 53"
96	Davide Bramati (ITA)	Lampre–Polti	+ 2h 22' 18"
97	Serhiy Utchakov (UKR)	Lampre–Polti	+ 2h 23' 08"
98	Uwe Raab (GER)	Team Telekom	+ 2h 23' 24"
99	Gerd Audehm (GER)	Team Telekom	+ 2h 24' 09"
100	Nelson Rodríguez (COL)	ZG Mobili	+ 2h 24' 13"
101	Steve Bauer (CAN)	Motorola	+ 2h 25' 46"
102	Herminio Diaz (ESP)	ONCE	+ 2h 25' 57"
103	Laurent Biondi (FRA)	Chazal–Vetta–MBK	+ 2h 26' 59"
104	Stefano Zanatta (ITA)	Gatorade–Mega Drive–Kenwood	+ 2h 27' 37"
105	Davide Cassani (ITA)	Ariostea	+ 2h 27' 58"
106	Frans Maassen (NED)	WordPerfect–Colnago–Decca	+ 2h 28' 55"
107	Marc Wauters (BEL)	Lotto	+ 2h 30' 33"
108	Jean-Pierre Delphis (FRA)	Chazal–Vetta–MBK	+ 2h 32' 50"
109	Laurent Desbiens (FRA)	Castorama	+ 2h 33' 05"
110	Serge Baguet (BEL)	Lotto	+ 2h 34' 45"
111	Mario Kummer (GER)	Team Telekom	+ 2h 35' 22"
112	Frédéric Moncassin (FRA)	WordPerfect–Colnago–Decca	+ 2h 35' 35"
113	Michel Vermote (BEL)	Festina–Lotus	+ 2h 36' 54"
114	Herman Frison (BEL)	Lotto	+ 2h 36' 58"
115	Christophe Capelle (FRA)	GAN	+ 2h 37' 23"
116	Michel Dernies (BEL)	Motorola	+ 2h 37' 37"
117	Jesus Montoya (ESP)	Amaya Seguros	+ 2h 38' 10"
118	Tom Cordes (NED)	Amaya Seguros	+ 2h 40' 12"
119	Patrice Esnault (FRA)	Chazal–Vetta–MBK	+ 2h 40' 47"
120	Mario Scirea (ITA)	Gatorade–Mega Drive–Kenwood	+ 2h 40' 53"
121	Jacky Durand (FRA)	Castorama	+ 2h 40' 57"
122	John Talen (NED)	TVM–Bison Kit	+ 2h 42' 11"
123	Philippe Casado (FRA)	GAN	+ 2h 43' 02"
124	Jean-Pierre Bourgeot (FRA)	Chazal–Vetta–MBK	+ 2h 44' 05"
125	Giovanni Fidanza (ITA)	Gatorade–Mega Drive–Kenwood	+ 2h 45' 31"
126	Prudencio Induráin (ESP)	Banesto	+ 2h 53' 49"
127	Gert Jakobs (NED)	Festina–Lotus	+ 2h 55' 48"
128	Andrea Tafi (ITA)	Carrera Jeans–Tassoni	+ 2h 56' 18"
129	Jelle Nijdam (NED)	WordPerfect–Colnago–Decca	+ 2h 56' 52"
130	Danny Nelissen (NED)	TVM–Bison Kit	+ 3h 00' 09"
131	Dieter Runkel (SUI)	WordPerfect–Colnago–Decca	+ 3h 01' 59"
132	Peter De Clercq (BEL)	Lotto	+ 3h 05' 21"
133	Jean-Claude Colotti (FRA)	GAN	+ 3h 05' 40"
134	Rob Mulders (NED)	WordPerfect–Colnago–Decca	+ 3h 06' 06"
135	Peter Farazijn (BEL)	Lotto	+ 3h 11' 43"
136	Edwig Van Hooydonck (BEL)	WordPerfect–Colnago–Decca	+ 3h 30' 15"

=== Points classification ===
Final points classification (1–10)
Rank	Rider	Team	Points
1	Djamolidine Abduzhaparov (UZB)	Lampre–Polti	298
2	Johan Museeuw (BEL)	GB–MG Maglificio	157
3	Maximilian Sciandri (GBR)	Motorola	153
4	François Simon (FRA)	Castorama	149
5	Christophe Capelle (FRA)	GAN	147
6	Frédéric Moncassin (FRA)	WordPerfect–Colnago–Decca	145
7	Miguel Induráin (ESP)	Banesto	136
8	Bjarne Riis (DEN)	Ariostea	133
9	Toni Rominger (SUI)	CLAS–Cajastur	126
10	Stefano Colagè (ITA)	ZG Mobili	120

=== Mountains classification ===
Final mountains classification (1–10)
Rank	Rider	Team	Points
1	Toni Rominger (SUI)	CLAS–Cajastur	449
2	Claudio Chiappucci (ITA)	Carrera Jeans–Tassoni	301
3	Oliviero Rincón (COL)	Amaya Seguros	286
4	Miguel Induráin (ESP)	Banesto	239
5	Richard Virenque (FRA)	Festina–Lotus	191
6	Alvaro Mejia (COL)	Motorola	187
7	Davide Cassani (ITA)	Ariostea	155
8	Zenon Jaskuła (POL)	GB–MG Maglificio	153
9	Leonardo Sierra (VEN)	ZG Mobili	136
10	Bjarne Riis (DEN)	Ariostea	113

=== Young rider classification ===
Final young rider classification (1–10)
Rank	Rider	Team	Time
1	Antonio Martín (ESP)	Amaya Seguros	96h 27' 00"
2	Oliviero Rincón (COL)	Amaya Seguros	+ 3' 28"
3	Richard Virenque (FRA)	Festina–Lotus	+ 8' 21"
4	Fernando Escartín (ESP)	CLAS–Cajastur	+ 23' 18"
5	Bo Hamburger (DEN)	TVM–Bison Kit	+ 23' 51"
6	Leonardo Sierra (VEN)	ZG Mobili	+ 31' 44"
7	Dimitri Zhdanov (RUS)	Novemail–Histor–Laser Computer	+ 45' 26"
8	Alex Zülle (SUI)	ONCE	+ 49' 07"
9	Laurent Brochard (FRA)	Castorama	+ 50' 26"
10	Eddy Bouwmans (NED)	Novemail–Histor–Laser Computer	+ 53' 21"

=== Team classification ===
Final team classification (1–10)
Rank	Team	Time
1	Carrera Jeans–Tassoni	288h 09' 5322
2	Ariostea	+ 47' 40"
3	CLAS–Cajastur	+ 48' 49"
4	Festina–Lotus	+ 1h 08' 42"
5	Banesto	+ 1h 08' 57"
6	GB–MG Maglificio	+ 1h 13' 59"
7	Motorola	+ 1h 27' 22"
8	ZG Mobili	+ 1h 35' 03"
9	Amaya Seguros	+ 1h 48' 48"
10	ONCE	+ 1h 51' 12"

=== Combativity classification ===
Final combativity classification (1–3)
Rank	Rider	Team	Points
1	Massimo Ghirotto (ITA)	ZG Mobili	34
2	Bjarne Riis (DEN)	Ariostea	25
3	Jacky Durand (FRA)	Castorama	23

== Bibliography ==
- Augendre, Jacques (2016). Guide historique [Historical guide] (PDF) (in French). Paris: Amaury Sport Organisation. Archived (PDF) from the original on 17 August 2016.
- McGann, Bill; McGann, Carol (2008). The Story of the Tour de France: 1965–2007. Vol. 2. Indianapolis: Dog Ear Publishing. ISBN 978-1-59858-608-4.
- Nauright, John; Parrish, Charles (2012). Sports Around the World: History, Culture, and Practice. Vol. 2. Santa Barbara, California: ABC-CLIO. ISBN 978-1-59884-300-2.
- van den Akker, Pieter (2018). Tour de France Rules and Statistics: 1903–2018. Self-published. ISBN 978-1-79398-080-9.
