= 1993 Volta a Catalunya =

Cycle race

Race details
- Dates: 9–15 September 1993
- Stages: 7
- Distance: 899.9 km (559.2 mi)
- Winning time: 23h 48' 26"

Results
	Winner	Álvaro Mejía (COL)	(Motorola)
	Second	Maurizio Fondriest (ITA)	(Lampre–Polti)
	Third	Antonio Martín (ESP)	(Amaya Seguros)
	Points	Laurent Jalabert (FRA)	(ONCE)
	Mountains	Julio César Cadena (COL)	(Kelme–Xacobeo)
	Sprints	Asier Guenetxea (ESP)	(Artiach–Filipinos–Chiquilin)
	Team	Amaya Seguros	

The 1993 Volta a Catalunya was the 73rd edition of the Volta a Catalunya cycle race, which was held from 9 September to 15 September 1993. The race started in Sant Feliu de Guíxols and finished in Vielha. The race was won by Álvaro Mejía of the Motorola team.

== General classification ==
Final general classification

Rank	Rider	Team	Time
1	Álvaro Mejía (COL)	Motorola	23h 48' 26"
2	Maurizio Fondriest (ITA)	Lampre–Polti	+ 4"
3	Antonio Martín (ESP)	Amaya Seguros	+ 35"
4	Miguel Induráin (ESP)	Banesto	+ 40"
5	Claudio Chiappucci (ITA)	Carrera Jeans–Tassoni	+ 43"
6	Alex Zülle (SUI)	ONCE	+ 50"
7	Oliverio Rincón (COL)	Amaya Seguros	+ 1' 49"
8	Jesús Montoya (ESP)	Amaya Seguros	+ 1' 59"
9	Mikel Zarrabeitia (ESP)	Amaya Seguros	+ 3' 29"
10	Harald Maier (AUT)	Festina–Lotus	+ 3' 43"
