= Young rider classification in the Tour de France =

White Jersey

White jersey
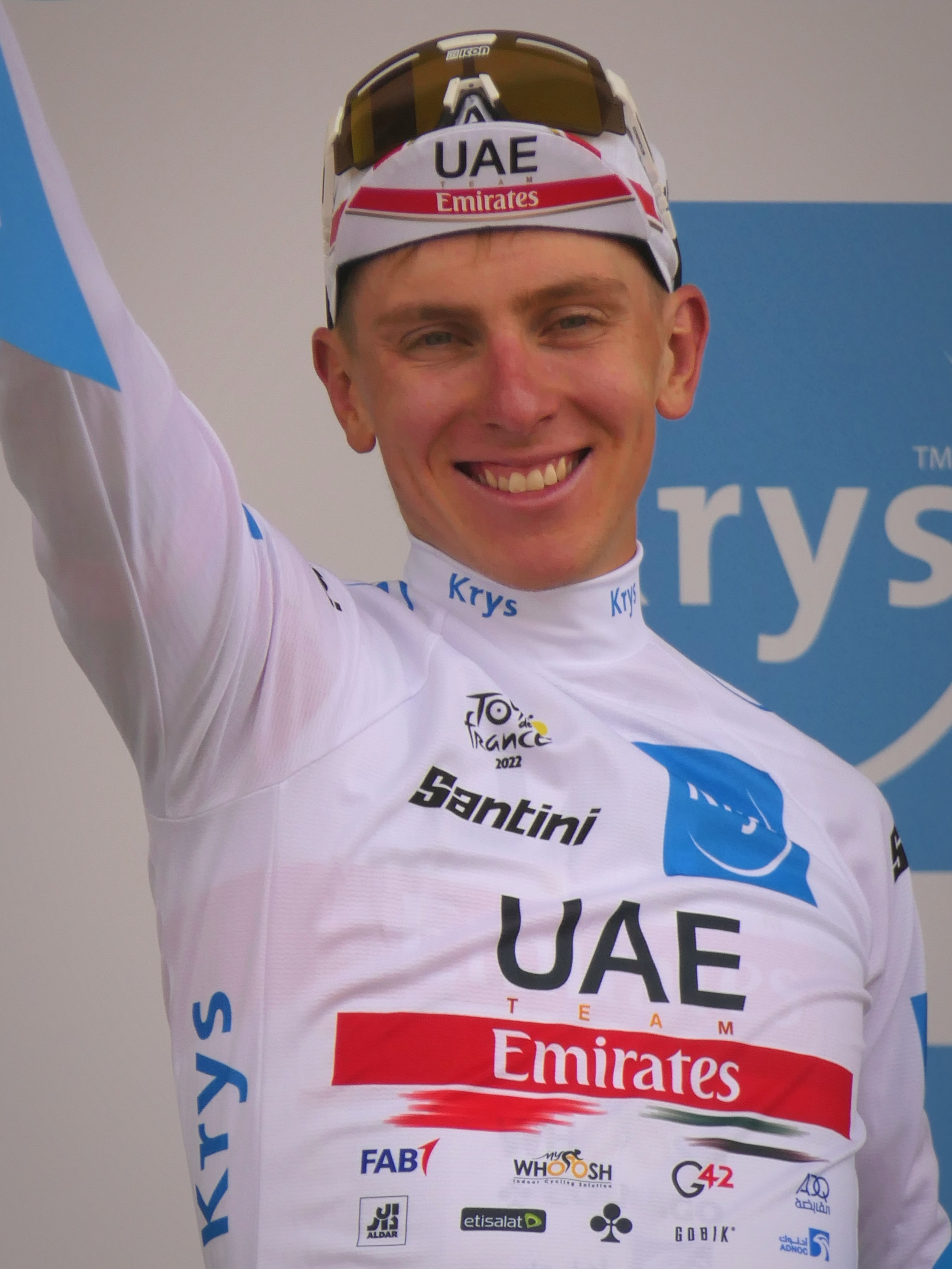
- Tadej Pogačar, only four-time winner of white jersey
- Sport: Road bicycle racing
- Competition: Tour de France
- Awarded for: Best young rider
- Local name: Maillot blanc (French)

History
- First award: 1975
- Editions: 52 (as of 2026)
- First winner: Francesco Moser (ITA)
- Most wins: 4 wins: Tadej Pogačar (SLO)
- Most recent: Isaac del Toro (MEX)

The young rider classification is a secondary competition in the Tour de France, that started in 1975. Excluding the years 1989 to 1999, the leader of the young rider classification wears a white jersey (French: maillot blanc). It goes to whichever eligible rider has the best time in the general classification.

The requirements to be eligible for the young rider classification have changed over the years but have always been such that experienced cyclists were not eligible, sometimes by excluding cyclists over a certain age, cyclists who had entered the Tour de France before, or cyclists who had been professional for more than two years. In the most recent years, only cyclists who will remain below 26 in the year the race is held are eligible.

In the Tour de France Femmes, the white jersey is awarded to the highest placed rider in the general classification under the age of 23.

== History ==
From 1968 to 1975, there was a white jersey awarded in the Tour de France to the lead rider in the combination classification (best rider in the overall, points and climbing competitions). In 1975, this classification was removed, and replaced by the young rider classification. Any neo-professional (less than three years professional) competed in this classification, which was calculated using the rankings for the general classification. The leader in the young rider classification wore a white jersey.

The rules for the young rider classification changed in 1983, when the competition was only open for first-time competitors, but in 1987 it became open for all cyclists less than 26 years of age at 1 January of the year following that tour. From 1989-1999, the white jersey was no longer awarded, although the competition was still calculated. Since 2000, the white jersey has again been awarded, open for all cyclists less than 26 years of age at 1 January of the year following that Tour. In 1997, the name of the competition officially changed to 'Souvenir Fabio Casartelli'.

=== Sponsorship ===
The optical retail chain Krys has sponsored the white jersey since 2015. The jersey was previously sponsored by Czech car manufacturer Škoda from 2004 to 2014.

=== Jerseys ranking ===
The white jersey is the fourth most important jersey in the Tour de France, after yellow, green and polka dot jerseys. If a rider leads one of the other classifications and the young rider classification, he will wear the yellow, green or the polka dot jersey. The second rider (or the following eligible rider) in the young rider classification will wear the white jersey with the following exception:

- if the second rider is world champion he will wear the rainbow jersey. If the rider is a contintinental champion or national champion he will wear the corresponding jersey;

In this case the third rider (or the following eligible rider) will be in the white jersey.

== Winners ==
Since the young rider classification was introduced in 1975, it has been won by 40 different cyclists. On seven occasions a cyclist has won the young rider classification and the general classification — Laurent Fignon in 1983, Jan Ullrich in 1997, Alberto Contador in 2007, Andy Schleck in 2010, Egan Bernal in 2019 and Tadej Pogačar in 2020 and 2021. The only cyclists to win the young rider classification and the mountains classification in the same year are Nairo Quintana in 2013 and Pogačar in 2020 and 2021.

The only cyclists to win the young rider classification multiple times are Marco Pantani (two wins), Jan Ullrich (three wins — also finishing first once or second twice in the general classification), Andy Schleck (three wins — also finishing first once and second once in the general classification), Nairo Quintana (two wins — also finishing second in the general classification both years), and Tadej Pogačar (four wins — also finishing first twice and second twice in the general classification). Quintana is the only rider to win the classification in non-consecutive years. Pogačar holds the absolute record of wearing the white jersey for 75 days in total. Tadej Pogačar also has the record of leading the young rider classification for 72 consecutive stages, between stage 13 of the 2020 Tour de France and the end of the 2023 Tour de France.

Year	Rider	Team	GC
1975	Francesco Moser (ITA)	Filotex	7
1976	Enrique Martínez Heredia (ESP)	Kas–Campagnolo	23
1977	Dietrich Thurau (FRG)	TI–Raleigh	5
1978	Henk Lubberding (NED)	TI–Raleigh–McGregor	8
1979	Jean-René Bernaudeau (FRA)	Renault–Gitane	5
1980	Johan van der Velde (NED)	TI–Raleigh–Creda	12
1981	Peter Winnen (NED)	Capri Sonne–Koga Miyata	5
1982	Phil Anderson (AUS)	Peugeot–Shell–Michelin	5
1983	Laurent Fignon (FRA)	Renault–Elf	1
1984	Greg LeMond (USA)	Renault–Elf	3
1985	Fabio Parra (COL)	Varta–Café de Colombia–Mavic	8
1986	Andrew Hampsten (USA)	La Vie Claire	4
1987	Raúl Alcalá (MEX)	7-Eleven	9
1988	Erik Breukink (NED)	Panasonic–Isostar–Colnago–Agu	12
1989	Fabrice Philipot (FRA)	Toshiba	24
1990	Gilles Delion (FRA)	Helvetia–La Suisse	15
1991	Álvaro Mejía (COL)	Postobón–Manzana–Ryalcao	19
1992	Eddy Bouwmans (NED)	Panasonic–Sportlife	14
1993	Antonio Martín (ESP)	Amaya Seguros	12
1994	Marco Pantani (ITA)	Carrera Jeans–Tassoni	3
1995	Marco Pantani (ITA)	Carrera Jeans–Tassoni	13
1996	Jan Ullrich (GER)	Team Telekom	2
1997	Jan Ullrich (GER)	Team Telekom	1
1998	Jan Ullrich (GER)	Team Telekom	2
1999	Benoît Salmon (FRA)	Casino–Ag2r Prévoyance	16
2000	Francisco Mancebo (ESP)	Banesto	9
2001	Óscar Sevilla (ESP)	Kelme–Costa Blanca	7
2002	Ivan Basso (ITA)	Fassa Bortolo	11
2003	Denis Menchov (RUS)	iBanesto.com	11
2004	Vladimir Karpets (RUS)	Illes Balears–Banesto	13
2005	Yaroslav Popovych (UKR)	Discovery Channel	12
2006	Damiano Cunego (ITA)	Lampre–Fondital	12
2007	Alberto Contador (ESP)	Discovery Channel	1
2008	Andy Schleck (LUX)	CSC–Saxo Bank	12
2009	Andy Schleck (LUX)	Team Saxo Bank	2
2010	Andy Schleck (LUX)	Team Saxo Bank	1
2011	Pierre Rolland (FRA)	Team Europcar	10
2012	Tejay van Garderen (USA)	BMC Racing Team	5
2013	Nairo Quintana (COL)	Movistar Team	2
2014	Thibaut Pinot (FRA)	FDJ.fr	3
2015	Nairo Quintana (COL)	Movistar Team	2
2016	Adam Yates (GBR)	Orica–BikeExchange	4
2017	Simon Yates (GBR)	Orica–Scott	7
2018	Pierre Latour (FRA)	AG2R La Mondiale	13
2019	Egan Bernal (COL)	Team INEOS	1
2020	Tadej Pogačar (SLO)	UAE Team Emirates	1
2021	Tadej Pogačar (SLO)	UAE Team Emirates	1
2022	Tadej Pogačar (SLO)	UAE Team Emirates	2
2023	Tadej Pogačar (SLO)	UAE Team Emirates	2
2024	Remco Evenepoel (BEL)	Soudal–Quick-Step	3
2025	Florian Lipowitz (GER)	Red Bull–Bora–Hansgrohe	3
2026	Isaac del Toro (MEX)	UAE Team Emirates XRG	3

=== By nationality ===
Tour de France young rider classification winners by nationality
Country	No. of winning cyclists	No. of wins
France	8	8
Netherlands	5	5
Spain	5	5
Italy	4	5
Colombia	4	5
Germany	3	5
Slovenia	1	4
United States	3	3
Luxembourg	1	3
Russia	2	2
United Kingdom	2	2
Mexico	2	2
Australia	1	1
Belgium	1	1
Ukraine	1	1

=== Days in white jersey ===
Note: 1989-1999 editions, when the classification didn't have a distinctive jersey are also taken into account.

Rider	Total
(Slovenia) Tadej Pogačar	75
(Germany) Jan Ullrich	55
(Australia) Phil Anderson	37
(France) Jean-René Bernaudeau	29
(Luxembourg) Andy Schleck	28
(West Germany) Dietrich Thurau	28
(Belgium) Remco Evenepoel	27

==== Riders leading all stages of an edition ====
- (West Germany) Dietrich Thurau 1977 (28 stages)
- (Australia) Phil Anderson 1982 (23 stages)
- (Germany) Jan Ullrich 1997 (22 stages)
- (Slovenia) Tadej Pogačar 2021 (21 stages)
- (Slovenia) Tadej Pogačar 2022 (21 stages)
- (Slovenia) Tadej Pogačar 2023 (21 stages)
