= Johan Bruyneel Cycling Academy =

Team information
- UCI code: JBCA
- Registered: United States
- Founded: 2007
- Discipline: Road
- Status: Amateur Development

Key personnel
- General manager: Bernard Moerman

Team name history
- Cycling Center
Jersey

The Johan Bruyneel Cycling Academy Team (UCI team code: JBCA), is an Amateur Development road bicycle racing team and named after Johan Bruyneel. JBCA attained UCI status in its inaugural year, 2007 when it changed its name from the Cycling Center. The team is managed by Bernard Moerman.

== 2008 ==
The link between the JBCA and Astana Director Johan Bruyneel strengthened the relationship of the Academy and Fuji Bicycle Corporation to supply the team with bicycles. Moerman also affirmed a sponsorship with SRAM.

== Team roster ==
Rider	Date of birth
Santiago Rosell (USA)	September 21, 1985 (age 40)
Steven Vanvooren (BEL)	November 18, 1986 (age 39)
Peter Horn (USA)	May 11, 1985 (age 41)
Aaron Pool (USA)	March 11, 1986 (age 40)
Vince Roberge (USA)	June 8, 1986 (age 40)
