= Antonio Martín =

Spanish cyclist (1970–1994)

- Martín in 1993

Personal information
- Full name: Antonio Martín Velasco
- Born: 24 May 1970 Torrelaguna, Spain
- Died: 11 February 1994 (aged 23) Torrelaguna, Spain

Cycling career
- Sport: Cycling
- Discipline: Road
- Role: Rider

Professional teams
- 1992–1993: Amaya Seguros
- 1994: Banesto

Major wins
- Tour de France Young rider classification (1993)

Antonio Martín Velasco (24 May 1970 – 11 February 1994) was a Spanish professional road bicycle racer from 1992 until his death in 1994.

Martín began his career in 1983 at Torrelaguna's cycling school. He remained there until 1985, attaining recognition at the junior and amateur levels. In 1992, he competed for the first time on the professional level, signing a group representing Amaya Seguros (Amaya Insurance) for the 1992 and 1993 seasons. While riding for team Amaya Seguros, he won the young rider classification in the 1993 Tour de France. He finished in 12th place overall.

On 11 February 1994, shortly after signing with the prestigious team Banesto, Martín was killed in a road accident while training.

== Major results ==
1988
2nd Road race, National Junior Road Championships
1991
1st Overall Volta a Tarragona
1st Trofeo Iberduero
2nd Overall Vuelta a Zamora
1992
1st Hucha de Oro
2nd Overall Vuelta a Murcia
2nd Overall Vuelta a La Rioja
2nd GP Villafranca de Ordizia
3rd Overall Volta a Catalunya
6th Overall Vuelta a Castilla y León
7th Overall Tour of Galicia
8th Overall Vuelta a Aragón
1993
1st Young rider classification, Tour de France
2nd Clásica a los Puertos de Guadarrama
3rd Overall Volta a Catalunya

1st Stage 5

3rd Overall Vuelta a Castilla y León
8th Overall Volta ao Algarve

== See also ==
- List of racing cyclists and pacemakers with a cycling-related death
