= Zenon Jaskuła =

Polish cyclist

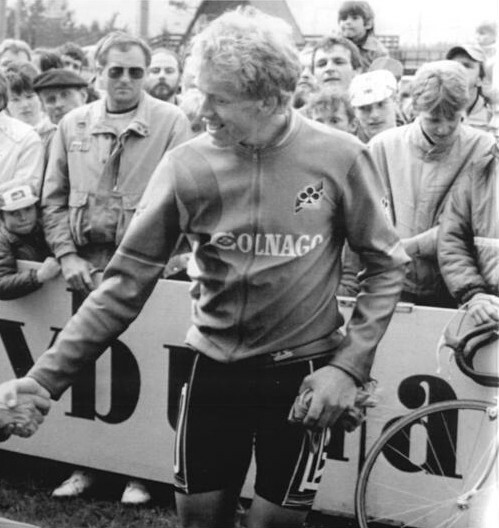
- Jaskuła in 1987

Personal information
- Full name: Zenon Jaskuła
- Born: 4 June 1962 (age 64) Śrem, Poland
- Height: 1.83 m (6 ft 0 in)
- Weight: 76 kg (168 lb; 12 st 0 lb)

Cycling career
- Sport: Cycling
- Current team: Retired
- Discipline: Road
- Role: Rider

Professional teams
- 1990: Diana–Colnago–Animex
- 1991: Del Tongo–MG Boys
- 1992–1993: GB–MG Maglificio
- 1994–1995: Jolly Componibili–Cage
- 1996: Brescialat
- 1997: Mapei–GB
- 1998: Ros Mary–Amica Chips

Major wins
- Volta a Portugal (1997)
Medal record
Representing Poland
Men's road bicycle racing
Olympic Games
Silver medal – second place	1988 Seoul	Team Road Race

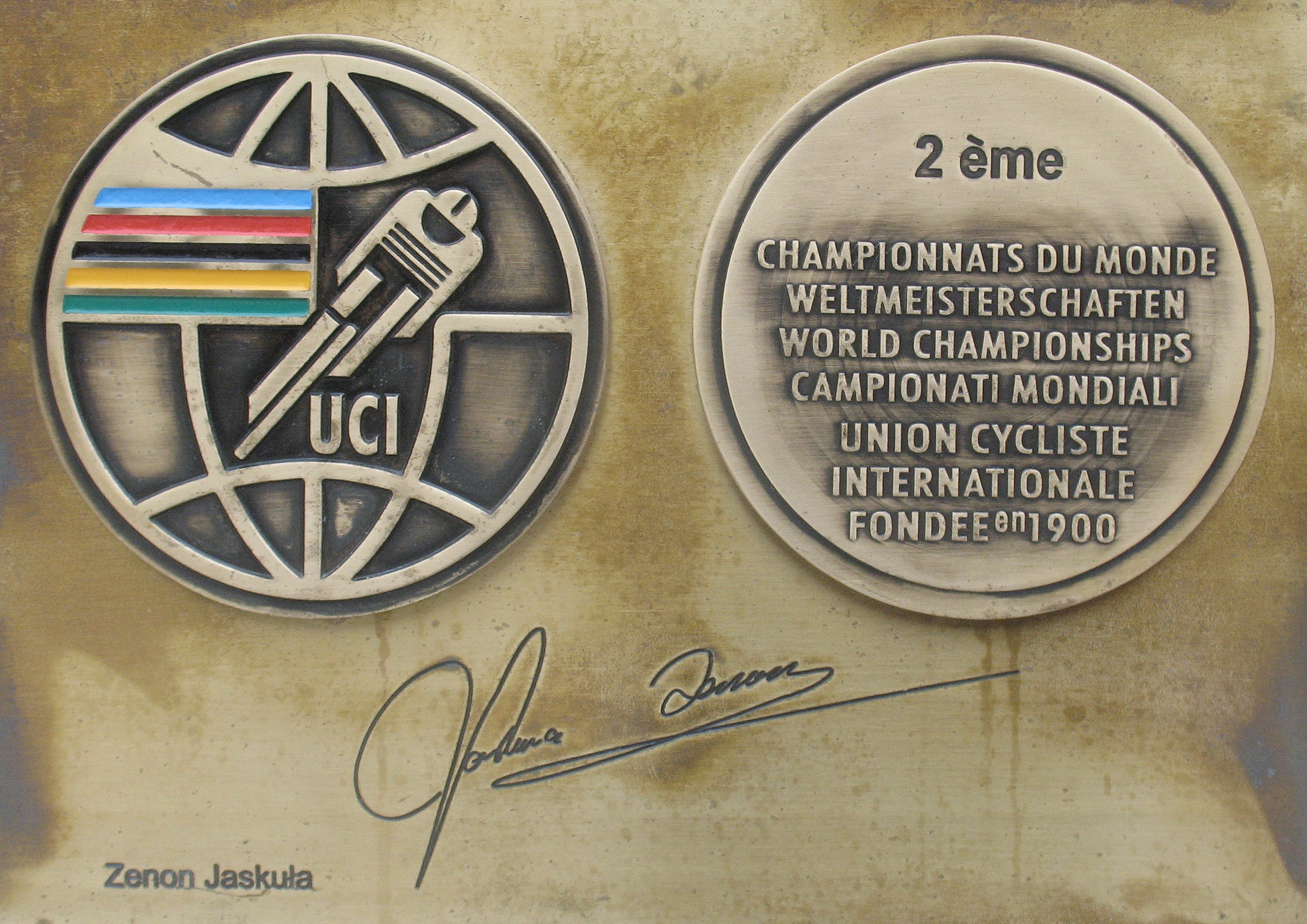
Copy of Z. Jaskuła medal and autograph in Alei Gwiazd Sportu w Dziwnowie

Zenon Jaskuła (born 4 June 1962) is a Polish former professional racing cyclist from Śrem, who was active in the 1990s. He won stage 16 and finished third overall in the 1993 Tour de France. He competed in the team time trial at the 1988 Summer Olympics winning a silver medal.

== Major results ==
1981
1st Stage 9 Tour de Pologne
1983
1st Stage 3 Circuit des Ardennes
1985
1st Duo time trial, National Road Championships (with Lech Piasecki)
1st Prologue & Stages 3 & 9 Tour de Pologne
1st Stage 1 Dookoła Mazowsza
1st Stage 1 Circuit de la Sarthe
1986
1st Time trial, National Road Championships
1st Overall Settimana Ciclistica Bergamasca
1987
1st Time trial, National Road Championships
1988
1st Time trial, National Road Championships
2nd (silver) Team time trial, Olympic Games
2nd Overall Niedersachsen Rundfahrt

1st Stages 1 & 9

1989
2nd Team time trial, UCI Road World Championships
2nd Overall Niedersachsen Rundfahrt
3rd Overall Peace Race
6th Overall Tour of Sweden
1990
1st Road race, National Road Championships
1st Overall Cronostaffetta

1st Stage 2

2nd Overall Tirreno–Adriatico
2nd Trofeo Baracchi (with Joachim Halupczok)
5th Overall Tour de Suisse
1991
7th Overall Tour de Romandie
9th Overall Giro d'Italia
9th Firenze–Pistoia
9th Giro dell'Emilia
1992
1st Stages 8 & 9 Herald Sun Tour
3rd Overall Giro del Trentino
3rd GP Industria & Commercio di Prato
3rd Melbourne–Mount Buller
3rd Mazda Alpine Tour
9th Overall Tour de Romandie
10th Giro di Toscana
1993
3rd Overall Tour de France

1st Stages 4 (TTT) & 16

1st Stage 6 (ITT) Tour de Suisse
7th Overall Giro del Trentino
8th Telekom Grand Prix
10th Overall Giro d'Italia
1994
1st Trofeo dello Scalatore
3rd Milano–Torino
9th Time trial, UCI Road World Championships
9th Giro del Veneto
1995
2nd Memorial Trochanowski em Varsóvia
3rd Overall Tour de Suisse
4th Overall Ronde van Nederland
5th Subida a Urkiola
7th Time trial, UCI Road World Championships
9th Overall Tour DuPont
1997
1st Overall Volta a Portugal

1st Stages 6 & 12

2nd Overall Tour de Pologne
9th Time trial, UCI Road World Championships

=== Grand Tour general classification results timeline ===
Grand Tour	1990	1991	1992	1993	1994	1995	1996	1997
Giro d'Italia	20	9	17	10	DNF	38	20	—
Tour de France	—	—	DNF	3	—	46	DNF	59
Vuelta a España	DNF	—	—	—	DNF	—	—	—
