= Johan Bruyneel =

Directeur sportif and former road bicycle racer

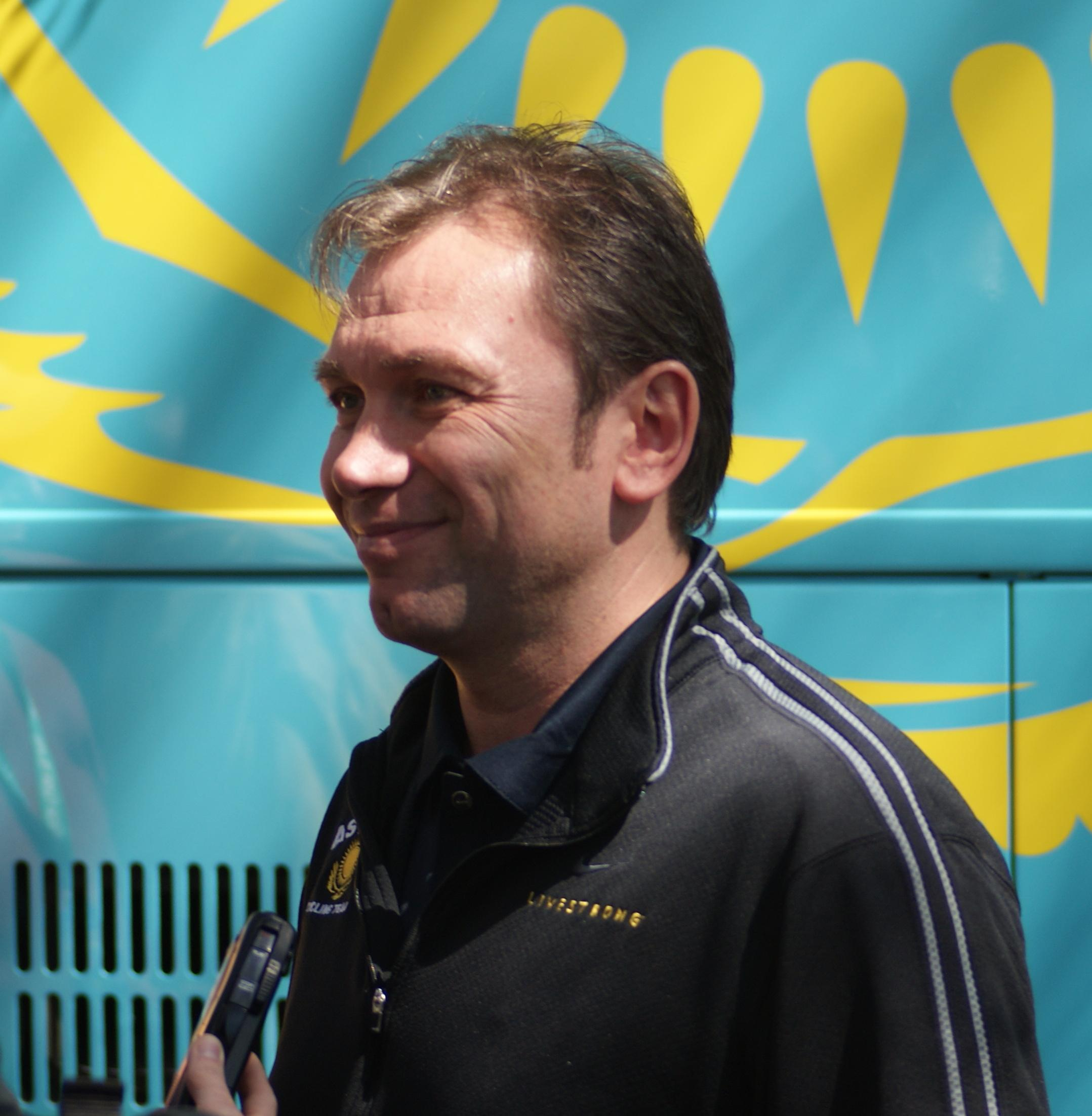
- Bruyneel in 2009

Personal information
- Full name: Johan Bruyneel
- Born: 23 August 1964 (age 62) Izegem, Belgium

Cycling career
- Sport: Cycling
- Discipline: Road
- Role: Manager

Professional teams
- 1989: SEFB
- 1990–1991: Lotto–Superclub
- 1992–1995: ONCE
- 1996–1997: Rabobank
- 1998: ONCE

Managerial teams
- 1999–2007: U.S. Postal Service
- 2008–2009: Astana
- 2010–2011: Team RadioShack
- 2012: RadioShack–Nissan

Major wins
- Grand Tours Tour de France 2 individual stages (1993, 1995) Vuelta a España 1 individual stages (1992) One-day races and Classics Rund um den Henninger Turm (1991)

Johan Bruyneel (born 23 August 1964) is a Belgian former professional road bicycle racer and a former directeur sportif for UCI ProTour team RadioShack–Nissan, and U.S. Postal Service (later known as Discovery Channel), a US-based UCI ProTour cycling team. On 25 October 2018, the World Anti Doping Agency imposed a lifetime ban on Bruyneel for his role in a doping scandal that also saw Lance Armstrong stripped of his seven Tour de France titles.

== History ==
=== Professional cyclist ===
Born in Izegem, Belgium, Bruyneel was a successful professional cyclist. Early wins included the 1990 Tour de l'Avenir, the 1991 Rund um den Henninger Turm, the 1992 Grand Prix des Nations and Coppa Placci, and stage 6 (Évreux > Amiens) and finishing 7th at the 1993 Tour de France. His stage win set the record for fastest stage at 49.417 km/h, since then only broken by two cyclists.

His greatest successes as a pro cyclist came in 1995. At the 1995 Tour de France, he won stage 7, which began in Charleroi and ended in Liège, Belgium, and took the yellow jersey in his home country. Bruyneel launched an escape and was joined by eventual winner Miguel Indurain. The Spaniard took the lead and rode the stage as a time-trial to gain time on his main rivals, with Bruyneel latched onto his wheel, barely able to follow the tempo. He then beat Indurain in the end sprint to win the stage. Bruyneel admitted he felt somewhat uneasy about how he had won. However, the win into Liège afforded him a chance meeting with the King of Belgium during the prize presentations. That same year, Bruyneel achieved his only podium finish in a Grand Tour when he finished 3rd at the 1995 Vuelta a España and won the Aalst criterium.

In the 1996 Tour de France, he missed a curve when descending a hill in stage 7 (Chambéry > Les Arcs), and disappeared into a ravine. The moment was captured by a camera team that was driving right behind the group of descenders. After some time, Bruyneel could be seen climbing out of the ravine and getting back onto his bike to continue the stage, apparently unscathed.

=== Team director ===
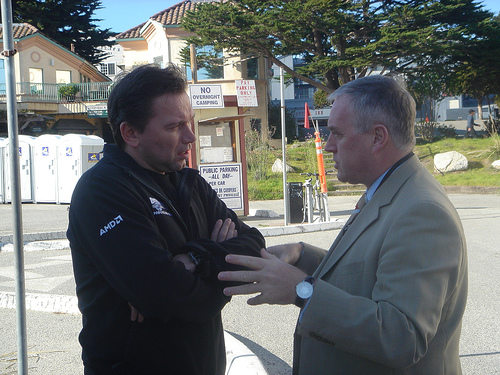
Bruyneel (left) with Pat McQuaid during the 2006 Tour of California

Following his retirement from cycling in 1998 at age 34, Bruyneel accepted the position of managing director of the U.S. Postal Service cycling team, whose star, Lance Armstrong, had finished fourth in the 1998 Vuelta a España, but whose team, in Armstrong's words, was the Bad News Bears, a mismatch of bikes, cars, clothing, equipment," with a total budget of only $3 million. Bruyneel's team promptly won eight of the next nine editions of the Tour de France, with Armstrong winning seven straight prior to his retirement in 2005 and then Alberto Contador winning in 2007 with Levi Leipheimer finishing third. However, Discovery Channel, which had taken over as the sponsor of the team in 2005, decided to withdraw in 2007 in the wake of the sport's extensive doping scandals, and the team disbanded. At that point, Bruyneel's teams had won ten Grand Tour championships in nine years (8 Tours de France, 1 Giro d'Italia (Savoldelli, 2005) and 1 Vuelta a España (Heras, 2003). Seven of these victories have since been nullified with the disqualification of Lance Armstrong from 1999 to 2005 from the Tour de France by USADA with ratification from the UCI.

At the time, Bruyneel announced his retirement and his plans to write a book. Bruyneel's book, We Might As Well Win, was published by Houghton Mifflin on 4 June 2008. Also, on 29 May 2008, Bruyneel joined the Board of Directors of World Bicycle Relief. But his retirement did not materialize.

In October 2007, after negotiations with the Kazakh government, Bruyneel was signed to take over control of the embattled Astana team, which had been kicked out of the 2007 Tour de France for doping violations and was in shambles over its doping connections. He brought Discovery's Contador and Leipheimer with him for the 2008 season. Although the team was banned from the Tour de France for its past doping history, Contador won both the 2008 Giro d'Italia and the 2008 Vuelta a España, making Contador the youngest rider to win all three Grand Tour championships. Additionally, Leipheimer finished second at the Vuelta.

Contador's victory in the Tour de France meant that Bruyneel had won four of the last six Grand Tours that his teams entered, and thirteen Grand Tour championships in eleven years (seven of these victories have since been nullified with the disqualification of Lance Armstrong from 1999 to 2005 from the Tour de France by USADA with ratification from the UCI). In 2010, Team RadioShack was formed with sponsorship from Radio Shack and Trek Bicycle Corporation. Bruyneel confirmed his departure from Astana at the end of the 2009 season to join Team RadioShack.

=== Conviction for doping ===
As of May 2010, he was under investigation by the Belgian cycling federation, after being accused by Floyd Landis of involvement in systematic doping while director sportif of Lance Armstrong's US Postal team.

On 28 June 2012, Bruyneel was accused by USADA (United States Anti-Doping Agency), although he is not an American citizen. Allegations include the assumption that Bruyneel was part of a long-running doping conspiracy, including the use of banned methods to augment the performance of the cycling teams that he directed. As a result of the allegations, Bruyneel declined to appear at the 2012 Tour de France, where he had been expected to direct the RadioShack-Nissan team.

While some accused in this case, such as Lance Armstrong and Michele Ferrari, did not seek to formally contest the charges via arbitration, Bruyneel asked for an arbitration hearing.

In October 2012, while still waiting for his hearing, Bruyneel left his position as managing director of RadioShack–Nissan, shortly after documents from the USADA case were released to the public. The termination was by mutual agreement with owners of Leopard SA. The day after Armstrong's acknowledgment that he doped during all of his Tours, Bruyneel announced that he would be in Brussels as soon as possible to speak to the Belgian national cycling organization and cooperate with its investigation.

In November 2013, Armstrong settled a lawsuit with Acceptance Insurance Company (AIC). AIC had sought to recover $3 million it had paid Armstrong as bonuses for winning the Tour de France from 1999 to 2001. The suit was settled for an undisclosed sum the day before Armstrong was scheduled to give an oral deposition under oath. In a written deposition for the lawsuit, Armstrong stated under oath that, "Johan Bruyneel participated in or assisted with Armstrong's use of PEDs, and knew of that use through their conversations and acts."

In April 2014, Bruyneel was given a ten-year ban by USADA, who noted that "the evidence establishes conclusively that Mr. Bruyneel was at the apex of a conspiracy to commit widespread doping on the USPS and Discovery Channel teams spanning many years and many riders." Said Bruyneel about the ban, "I do not dispute that there are certain elements of my career that I wish had been different. However, a very small minority of us has been used as scapegoats for an entire generation."

In October 2018, the World Anti-Doping Agency successfully increased his ten-year ban to a lifetime ban.

== Major results ==
=== As rider ===
1983
3rd Trofee van Vlaanderen Juniors
1987
6th Flèche Hesbignonne
6th Halle–Ingooigem
1988
1st Izegem Koers
4th GP Stad Vilvoorde
6th Overall Tour de l'Avenir

1st Stage 1

1989
1st Memorial Fred De Bruyne
3rd Tour de Vendée
4th LuK Challenge Chrono
5th Druivenkoers Overijse
5th Nationale Sluitingsprijs
6th Overall Tour de l'Avenir

1st Stage 7

7th Grand Prix de Wallonie
9th Overall Tour de Suisse

1st Stages 2 & 10

1990
1st Overall Tour de l'Avenir
3rd Overall Tour of Galicia
3rd Grand Prix de Wallonie
4th Overall Tour du Vaucluse

1st Stage 4

5th Binche–Chimay–Binche
5th Omloop Mandel-Leie-Schelde
6th Tour de Berne
10th Overall Giro del Trentino
1991
1st Eschborn-Frankfurt
2nd Overall Tour of the Basque Country

1st Stage 5

2nd Cholet-Pays de la Loire
2nd Grand Prix de Wallonie
4th Overall Critérium International
4th Circuit des Frontières
5th Subida a Urkiola
6th La Flèche Wallonne
7th Overall Grand Prix du Midi Libre

1st Stage 3

10th Classique des Alpes
1992
1st Stage 12 Vuelta a España
1st Coppa Placci
1st Grand Prix des Nations
5th Overall Critérium International
7th Overall Volta a la Comunitat Valenciana
8th Overall Clásico RCN
9th Overall Tour of the Basque Country
9th Overall Volta a Catalunya

1st Stage 1 (TTT)

1993
1st Stage 3 Catalaanse Week
4th LuK Challenge Chrono
7th Overall Tour de France

1st Stage 6

9th Overall Vuelta a España
1994
6th Overall Volta a Catalunya
7th Overall Vuelta a La Rioja

1st Stages 3 (TTT) & 4

1995
1st Stage 7 Tour de France
1st Stage 6 Grand Prix du Midi Libre
2nd Grand Prix Eddy Merckx
3rd Overall Vuelta a España
6th Overall Volta a la Comunitat Valenciana
6th Klasika Primavera
1996
3rd Belgian National Road Race Championships
3rd Overall Hofbräu-Cup

1st Stage 3

1997
1st Namense Pijl
4th Tour de Berne
5th Overall Catalaanse Week

=== Grand Tour general classification results timeline ===
Grand Tour	1990	1991	1992	1993	1994	1995	1996	1997	1998
Giro d'Italia	—	—	—	—	—	—	—	—	—
Tour de France	17	35	—	7	—	31	DNF	—	DNF
/ Vuelta a España	—	—	15	9	—	3	—	—	—

Legend
—	Did not compete
DNF	Did not finish

=== As director ===
- Giro d'Italia (2): Winner of the general classification with Paolo Savoldelli in 2005, and with Alberto Contador in 2008.
- Tours de France (2): Winner of the general classification with Alberto Contador in 2007 and 2009.

- Lance Armstrong was disqualified from seven Tour de France victories directed by Bruyneel.

- Vuelta a España (2): Winner of the general classification with Roberto Heras in 2003 and with Alberto Contador in 2008.

== Personal life ==
Johan Bruyneel is married to his wife, Eva Maria Bruyneel. They have two children together: a daughter named Victoria and a son named Christian.

== Written work ==
- We Might As Well Win: On the Road to Success with the Mastermind Behind a Record-Setting Eight Tour de France Victories, ISBN 0-618-87937-4

== See also ==
- Johan Bruyneel Cycling Academy
