= Philippe Louviot =

French cyclist

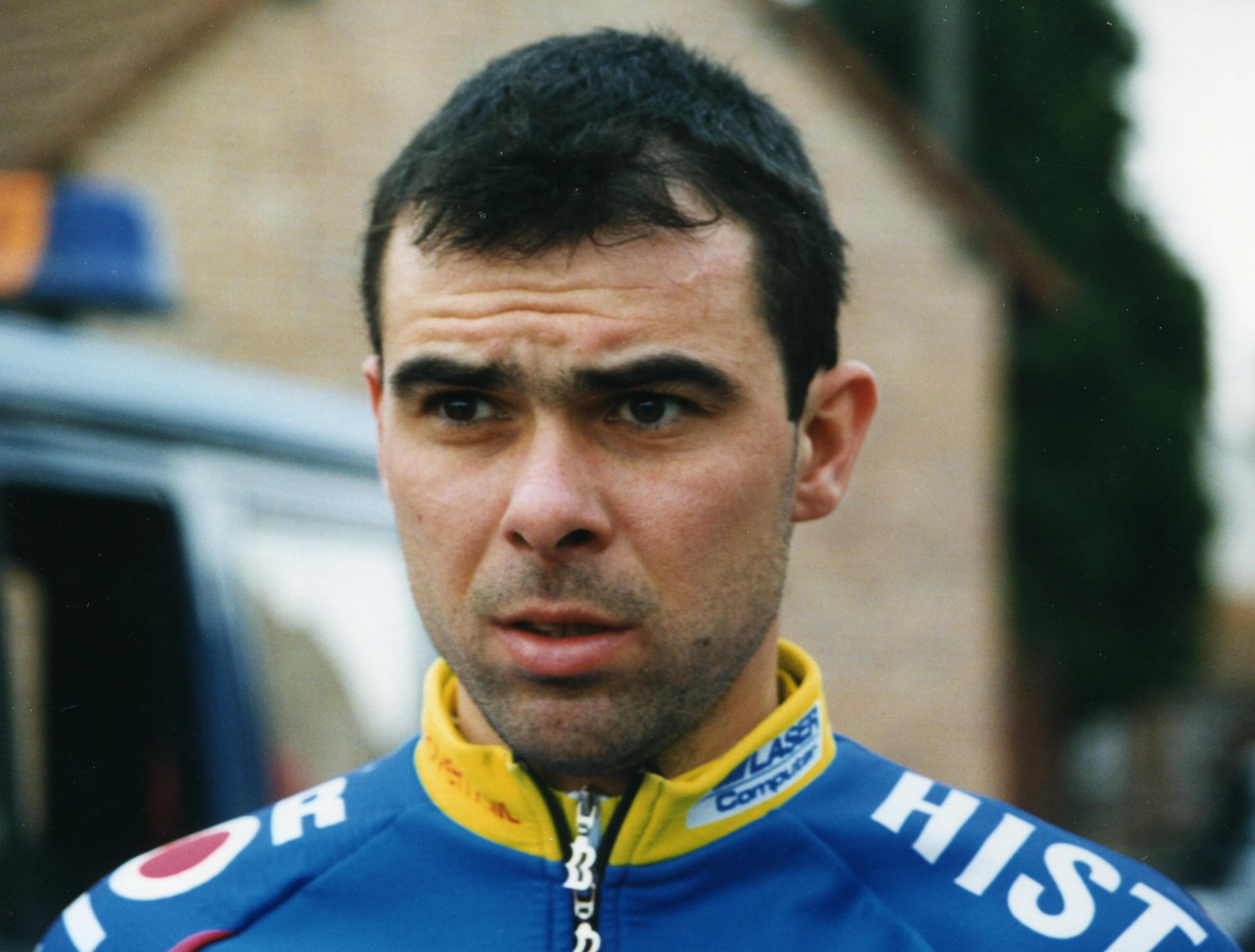
- Philippe Louviot

Personal information
- Full name: Philippe Louviot
- Born: 14 March 1964 (age 62) Nogent-sur-Marne, France

Cycling career
- Sport: Cycling
- Role: Rider

Philippe Louviot (born 14 March 1964) is a former French racing cyclist. He won the French national road race title in 1990.
