= Álvaro Mejía (cyclist) =

Colombian cyclist

Personal information
- Full name: Álvaro Mejía Castrillón
- Nickname: El Cometa
- Born: January 19, 1967 (age 59) Santa Rosa de Cabal, Colombia

Cycling career
- Sport: Cycling
- Current team: Retired
- Disciplines: Road and mountain biking
- Role: Rider
- Rider type: Climber

Amateur team
- 1988: Castalia

Professional teams
- 1989–1992: Postobón–Manzana
- 1993–1995: Motorola
- 1997: Petroleo de Colombia

Major wins
- Tour de France, young rider classification (1991); Volta a Catalunya (1993)

Álvaro Mejía Castrillón (born January 19, 1967, in Santa Rosa de Cabal, Risaralda Department) is a Colombian former professional road cyclist.

Mejía took up cycling at the age of 16, after watching Lucho Herrera, Fabio Parra and Óscar Vargas racing in the Vuelta a Colombia. He had previously competed in football and athletics, having been national junior champion for the 10,000 metres. In 1988 he won the Under-23 Vuelta a Colombia and the Clásico RCN. He won the young rider classification in the 1991 Tour de France and finished fourth at the 1991 UCI Road World Championships in Stuttgart, where he was part of the winning break alongside Gianni Bugno, Steven Rooks and Miguel Indurain. Mejía joined the Motorola team in 1993: that season he won the Volta a Catalunya and finished fourth in the 1993 Tour de France. Subsequently he spent two more seasons with Motorola before finishing his road racing career with the Petroleo de Colombia team. He spent two more years racing mountain bikes before retiring from competition. During his career he also won other stage races including the Vuelta a Murcia, Route du Sud and Vuelta a Galicia.

After retiring from competition, Mejía became a doctor and lecturer, and has taught at the Technological University of Pereira and the Universidad Andina in Pereira.

== Career achievements ==
=== Major results ===
1987
3rd Overall Clásico RCN

1st Stage 7

1988
1st Overall Clásico RCN
2nd Overall Vuelta a Colombia

1st Prologue & Stage 6

1989
1st Overall Clásico RCN

1st Stages 6 & 8 (ITT)

3rd Trofeo Masferrer
1990
2nd Overall Clásico RCN
3rd Overall Critérium du Dauphiné Libéré

1st Stage 8 (ITT)

1991
1st Young rider classification, Tour de France
1st Overall Tour of Galicia

1st Stage 3

4th Road race, UCI Road World Championships
4th Overall Volta a Catalunya
1992
1st Overall Vuelta a Murcia
4th Overall Clásico RCN

1st Prologue

1993
1st Overall Volta a Catalunya
3rd Overall Tour of Galicia
4th Overall Tour de France
1994
1st Overall Route du Sud
6th Overall Vuelta a Murcia
1995
4th Overall Tour DuPont
8th Overall Critérium du Dauphiné Libéré

=== Grand Tour general classification results timeline ===
Grand Tour	1990	1991	1992	1993	1994	1995
Giro d'Italia	—	—	—	30	39	—
Tour de France	49	19	DNF	4	31	16
Vuelta a España	17	22	29	—	—	DNF

Legend
DSQ	Disqualified
DNF	Did not finish
