= 1992 UCI Road World Cup =

- Fourth edition of the UCI Road World Cup

Details
- Dates: March 21 – October 24
- Location: Canada and Europe
- Races: 12

Champions
- Individual champion: Olaf Ludwig (GER) (Panasonic–Sportlife)
- Teams' champion: Panasonic–Sportlife

The 1992 UCI Road World Cup was the fourth edition of the UCI Road World Cup. From the 1991 edition, the Grand Prix de la Libération was dropped and no longer ran and the Grand Prix des Amériques became the Grand Prix Téléglobe. The final individual time trial event, held in 1991 around Bergamo and counting as both the Grand Prix des Nations and the Trofeo Baracchi, was chosen to be the Grand Prix des Nations proper, although held in Palma de Mallorca rather than in France. The competition was won by German rider Olaf Ludwig of Panasonic–Sportlife.

== Races ==
Date	Race	Country	Winner	Team	World Cup Leader	Leader's Team	Report
March 21	Milan–San Remo	Italy	Sean Kelly (IRL)	Lotus–Festina	Sean Kelly (IRL)	Lotus–Festina	Report
April 5	Tour of Flanders	Belgium	Jacky Durand (FRA)	Castorama	Jacky Durand (FRA)	Castorama	Report
April 12	Paris–Roubaix	France	Gilbert Duclos-Lassalle (FRA)	Z	Olaf Ludwig (GER)	Panasonic–Sportlife	Report
April 19	Liège–Bastogne–Liège	Belgium	Dirk De Wolf (BEL)	Gatorade–Chateau d'Ax	Dirk De Wolf (BEL)	Gatorade–Chateau d'Ax	Report
April 25	Amstel Gold Race	Netherlands	Olaf Ludwig (GER)	Panasonic–Sportlife	Olaf Ludwig (GER)	Panasonic–Sportlife	Report
August 8	Clásica de San Sebastián	Spain	Raúl Alcalá (MEX)	PDM–Ultima–Concorde	Olaf Ludwig (GER)	Panasonic–Sportlife	Report
August 16	Wincanton Classic	United Kingdom	Massimo Ghirotto (ITA)	Carrera Jeans–Vagabond	Olaf Ludwig (GER)	Panasonic–Sportlife	Report
August 23	Züri-Metzgete	Switzerland	Viatcheslav Ekimov (RUS)	Panasonic–Sportlife	Olaf Ludwig (GER)	Panasonic–Sportlife	Report
October 4	Grand Prix Téléglobe	Canada	Federico Echave (ESP)	CLAS–Cajastur	Olaf Ludwig (GER)	Panasonic–Sportlife	Report
October 11	Paris–Tours	France	Hendrik Redant (BEL)	Lotto–Mavic–MBK	Olaf Ludwig (GER)	Panasonic–Sportlife	Report
October 17	Giro di Lombardia	Italy	Tony Rominger (SUI)	CLAS–Cajastur	Olaf Ludwig (GER)	Panasonic–Sportlife	Report
October 24	Grand Prix des Nations	Spain	Johan Bruyneel (BEL)	ONCE	Olaf Ludwig (GER)	Panasonic–Sportlife	Report

== Single races details ==
worldcupjersey	Denotes the Classification Leader

In the race results the leader jersey identify the rider who wore the jersey in the race (the leader at the start of the race).

In the general classification table the jersey identify the leader after the race.

21 March 1992 — Milan–San Remo 294 km (182.7 mi)

	Rider	Team	Time
1	Sean Kelly (IRL)	Lotus–Festina	7h 31' 42"
2	Moreno Argentin (ITA)	Ariostea	s.t.
3	Johan Museeuw (BEL)	Lotto–Mavic–MBK	+ 3"
4	Uwe Raab (GER)	PDM–Ultima–Concorde	s.t.
5	Scott Sunderland (AUS)	TVM–Sanyo	s.t.
6	Olaf Ludwig (GER)	Panasonic–Sportlife	s.t.
7	Nico Verhoeven (NED)	PDM–Ultima–Concorde	s.t.
8	Etienne De Wilde (BEL)	Team Telekom	s.t.
9	Laurent Jalabert (FRA)	ONCE	s.t.
10	Rolf Sørensen (DEN)	Ariostea	s.t.

General classification after Milan–San Remo

	Rider	Team	Points
1	Sean Kelly (IRL)	Lotus–Festina	50
2	Moreno Argentin (ITA)	Ariostea	35
3	Johan Museeuw (BEL)	Lotto–Mavic–MBK	25
4	Uwe Raab (GER)	PDM–Ultima–Concorde	20
5	Scott Sunderland (AUS)	TVM–Sanyo	18
6	Olaf Ludwig (GER)	Panasonic–Sportlife	16
7	Nico Verhoeven (NED)	PDM–Ultima–Concorde	14
8	Etienne De Wilde (BEL)	Team Telekom	12
9	Laurent Jalabert (FRA)	ONCE	10
10	Rolf Sørensen (DEN)	Ariostea	8

5 April 1992 — Tour of Flanders 260 km (161.6 mi)

	Rider	Team	Time
1	Jacky Durand (FRA)	Castorama	6h 37' 19"
2	Thomas Wegmüller (SUI)	Lotus–Festina	+ 48"
3	Edwig Van Hooydonck (BEL)	Buckler–Colnago–Decca	+ 1' 44"
4	Maurizio Fondriest (ITA)	Panasonic–Sportlife	s.t.
5	Frans Maassen (NED)	Buckler–Colnago–Decca	+ 1' 57"
6	Jelle Nijdam (NED)	Buckler–Colnago–Decca	s.t.
7	Marc Madiot (FRA)	Team Telekom	s.t.
8	Jesper Skibby (DEN)	TVM–Sanyo	s.t.
9	Franco Ballerini (ITA)	GB–MG Maglificio	s.t.
10	Dirk De Wolf (BEL)	Gatorade–Chateau d'Ax	s.t.

General classification after Tour of Flanders

	Rider	Team	Points
1	Jacky Durand (FRA)	Castorama	50
2	Sean Kelly (IRL)	Lotus–Festina	50
3	Thomas Wegmüller (SUI)	Lotus–Festina	35
4	Moreno Argentin (ITA)	Ariostea	35
5	Edwig Van Hooydonck (BEL)	Buckler–Colnago–Decca	31
6	Johan Museeuw (BEL)	Lotto–Mavic–MBK	25
7	Maurizio Fondriest (ITA)	Panasonic–Sportlife	20
8	Uwe Raab (GER)	PDM–Ultima–Concorde	20
9	Frans Maassen (NED)	Buckler–Colnago–Decca	18
10	Scott Sunderland (AUS)	TVM–Sanyo	18

12 April 1992 — Paris–Roubaix 267 km (165.9 mi)

	Rider	Team	Time
1	Gilbert Duclos-Lassalle (FRA)	Z	6h 26' 56"
2	Olaf Ludwig (GER)	Panasonic–Sportlife	34"
3	Johan Capiot (BEL)	TVM–Sanyo	1' 22"
4	Peter Pieters (NED)	Tulip Computers	1' 22"
5	Jean-Claude Colotti (FRA)	Z	1' 22"
6	Etienne De Wilde (BEL)	Team Telekom	1' 22"
7	Johan Museeuw (BEL)	Lotto–Mavic–MBK	1' 22"
8	Nico Verhoeven (NED)	PDM–Ultima–Concorde	1' 22"
9	Greg LeMond (USA)	Z	1' 22"
10	Hendrik Redant (BEL)	Lotto–Mavic–MBK	1' 22"

General classification after Paris–Roubaix

	Rider	Team	Points
1	Olaf Ludwig (GER)	Panasonic–Sportlife	51
2	Gilbert Duclos-Lassalle (FRA)	Z	50
3	Jacky Durand (FRA)	Castorama	50
4	Sean Kelly (IRL)	Lotus–Festina	50
5	Johan Museeuw (BEL)	Lotto–Mavic–MBK	39
6	Thomas Wegmüller (SUI)	Lotus–Festina	35
7	Moreno Argentin (ITA)	Ariostea	35
8	Edwig Van Hooydonck (BEL)	Buckler–Colnago–Decca	31
9	Etienne De Wilde (BEL)	Team Telekom	28
10	Nico Verhoeven (NED)	PDM–Ultima–Concorde	26

19 April 1992 — Liège–Bastogne–Liège 262 km (162.8 mi)

	Rider	Team	Time
1	Dirk De Wolf (BEL)	Gatorade–Chateau d'Ax	7h 18' 06"
2	Steven Rooks (NED)	Buckler–Colnago–Decca	+ 30"
3	Jean-François Bernard (FRA)	Banesto	+ 30"
4	Davide Cassani (ITA)	Ariostea	+ 1' 35"
5	Tony Rominger (SUI)	CLAS–Cajastur	+ 2' 00"
6	Gérard Rué (FRA)	Castorama	+ 2' 00"
7	Gert-Jan Theunisse (NED)	TVM–Sanyo	+ 2' 00"
8	Giorgio Furlan (ITA)	Ariostea	+ 2' 00"
9	Robert Millar (GBR)	TVM–Sanyo	+ 2' 07"
10	Edwig Van Hooydonck (BEL)	Buckler–Colnago–Decca	+ 2' 12"

General classification after Liège–Bastogne–Liège

	Rider	Team	Points
1	Dirk De Wolf (BEL)	Gatorade–Chateau d'Ax	58
2	Olaf Ludwig (GER)	Panasonic–Sportlife	51
3	Gilbert Duclos-Lassalle (FRA)	Z	50
4	Jacky Durand (FRA)	Castorama	50
5	Sean Kelly (IRL)	Lotus–Festina	50
6	Johan Museeuw (BEL)	Lotto–Mavic–MBK	39
7	Edwig Van Hooydonck (BEL)	Buckler–Colnago–Decca	39
8	Steven Rooks (NED)	Buckler–Colnago–Decca	35
9	Thomas Wegmüller (SUI)	Lotus–Festina	35
10	Moreno Argentin (ITA)	Ariostea	35

25 April 1992 — Amstel Gold Race 247.5 km (153.8 mi)

	Rider	Team	Time
1	Olaf Ludwig (GER)	Panasonic–Sportlife	6h 27' 30"
2	Johan Museeuw (BEL)	Lotto–Mavic–MBK	s.t.
3	Dimitri Konyshev (RUS)	TVM–Sanyo	s.t.
4	Jean-Claude Colotti (FRA)	Z	s.t.
5	Luc Roosen (BEL)	Tulip Computers	s.t.
6	Vadim Chabalkine (RUS)	Lotus–Festina	s.t.
7	Gilbert Duclos-Lassalle (FRA)	Z	s.t.
8	Guido Bontempi (ITA)	Carrera Jeans–Vagabond	s.t.
9	Jelle Nijdam (NED)	Buckler–Colnago–Decca	s.t.
10	Gert-Jan Theunisse (NED)	TVM–Sanyo	s.t.

General classification after Amstel Gold Race

	Rider	Team	Points
1	Olaf Ludwig (GER)	Panasonic–Sportlife	101
2	Johan Museeuw (BEL)	Lotto–Mavic–MBK	74
3	Gilbert Duclos-Lassalle (FRA)	Z	64
4	Dirk De Wolf (BEL)	Gatorade–Chateau d'Ax	58
5	Jacky Durand (FRA)	Castorama	50
6	Sean Kelly (IRL)	Lotus–Festina	50
7	Steven Rooks (NED)	Buckler–Colnago–Decca	40
8	Edwig Van Hooydonck (BEL)	Buckler–Colnago–Decca	39
9	Jean-Claude Colotti (FRA)	Z	38
10	Thomas Wegmüller (SUI)	Lotus–Festina	35
10	Moreno Argentin (ITA)	Ariostea	35

8 August 1992 — Clásica de San Sebastián 234 km (145.4 mi)

	Cyclist	Team	Time
1	Raúl Alcalá (MEX)	PDM–Ultima–Concorde	5h 58' 17"
2	Claudio Chiappucci (ITA)	Carrera Jeans–Vagabond	+ 1' 11"
3	Eddy Bouwmans (NED)	Panasonic–Sportlife	+ 1' 12"
4	Dimitri Konyshev (RUS)	TVM–Sanyo	s.t.
5	Luc Roosen (BEL)	Tulip Computers	s.t.
6	Max Sciandri (ITA)	Motorola	+ 1' 38"
7	Davide Cassani (ITA)	Ariostea	s.t.
8	Maurizio Fondriest (ITA)	Panasonic–Sportlife	s.t.
9	Jim Van De Laer (BEL)	Tulip Computers	s.t.
10	Enrique Alonso (ESP)	Lotus–Festina	s.t.

General classification after Clásica de San Sebastián

	Cyclist	Team	Points
1	Olaf Ludwig (GER)	Panasonic–Sportlife	101
2	Johan Museeuw (BEL)	Lotto–Mavic–MBK	74
3	Gilbert Duclos-Lassalle (FRA)	Z	64
4	Dirk De Wolf (BEL)	Gatorade–Chateau d'Ax	58
5	Raúl Alcalá (MEX)	PDM–Ultima–Concorde	56
6	Jacky Durand (FRA)	Castorama	50
7	Sean Kelly (IRL)	Lotus–Festina	50
8	Dimitri Konyshev (RUS)	TVM–Sanyo	45
9	Steven Rooks (NED)	Buckler–Colnago–Decca	40
10	Edwig Van Hooydonck (BEL)	Buckler–Colnago–Decca	39

15 August 1992 — Wincanton Classic 236.6 km (147.0 mi)

	Cyclist	Team	Time
1	Massimo Ghirotto (ITA)	Carrera Jeans–Vagabond	5h 58' 17"
2	Laurent Jalabert (FRA)	ONCE	+ 1' 10"
3	Bruno Cenghialta (ITA)	Ariostea	+ 2' 14"
4	Claudio Chiappucci (ITA)	Carrera Jeans–Vagabond	+ 2' 36"
5	Fabian Jeker (SUI)	Helvetia–Commodore	s.t.
6	Raúl Alcalá (MEX)	PDM–Ultima–Concorde	+ 3' 04"
7	Steven Rooks (NED)	Buckler–Colnago–Decca	s.t.
8	Scott Sunderland (AUS)	TVM–Sanyo	s.t.
9	Alex Zülle (SUI)	ONCE	s.t.
10	Luc Roosen (BEL)	Tulip Computers	s.t.

General classification after Wincanton Classic

	Cyclist	Team	Points
1	Olaf Ludwig (GER)	Panasonic–Sportlife	101
2	Johan Museeuw (BEL)	Lotto–Mavic–MBK	74
3	Raúl Alcalá (MEX)	PDM–Ultima–Concorde	72
4	Gilbert Duclos-Lassalle (FRA)	Z	64
5	Dirk De Wolf (BEL)	Gatorade–Chateau d'Ax	58
6	Massimo Ghirotto (ITA)	Carrera Jeans–Vagabond	55
7	Claudio Chiappucci (ITA)	Carrera Jeans–Vagabond	55
8	Steven Rooks (NED)	Buckler–Colnago–Decca	54
9	Jacky Durand (FRA)	Castorama	50
10	Sean Kelly (IRL)	Lotus–Festina	50

23 August 1992 — Züri-Metzgete 240 km (149.1 mi)

	Cyclist	Team	Time
1	Viatcheslav Ekimov (RUS)	Panasonic–Sportlife	6h 00' 01"
2	Lance Armstrong (USA)	Motorola	+ 15"
3	Jan Nevens (BEL)	Lotto–Mavic–MBK	s.t.
4	Guido Bontempi (ITA)	Carrera Jeans–Vagabond	+ 35"
5	Bruno Leali (ITA)	Mercatone Uno–Medeghini–Zucchini	s.t.
6	Marc Madiot (FRA)	Team Telekom	s.t.
7	Martin Earley (IRL)	PDM–Ultima–Concorde	s.t.
8	Laurent Jalabert (FRA)	ONCE	+ 59"
9	Adrie van der Poel (NED)	Tulip Computers	s.t.
10	Scott Sunderland (AUS)	TVM–Sanyo	s.t.

General classification after Züri-Metzgete

	Cyclist	Team	Points
1	Olaf Ludwig (GER)	Panasonic–Sportlife	101
2	Johan Museeuw (BEL)	Lotto–Mavic–MBK	74
3	Raúl Alcalá (MEX)	PDM–Ultima–Concorde	72
4	Gilbert Duclos-Lassalle (FRA)	Z	64
5	Dirk De Wolf (BEL)	Gatorade–Chateau d'Ax	58
6	Laurent Jalabert (FRA)	ONCE	57
7	Massimo Ghirotto (ITA)	Carrera Jeans–Vagabond	55
8	Claudio Chiappucci (ITA)	Carrera Jeans–Vagabond	55
9	Steven Rooks (NED)	Buckler–Colnago–Decca	54
10	Viatcheslav Ekimov (RUS)	Panasonic–Sportlife	50
10	Jacky Durand (FRA)	Castorama	50
10	Sean Kelly (IRL)	Lotus–Festina	50

4 October 1992 — Grand Prix Téléglobe 224 km (139.2 mi)

	Cyclist	Team	Time
1	Federico Echave (ESP)	CLAS–Cajastur	5h 50' 59"
2	Davide Cassani (ITA)	Ariostea	s.t.
3	Luc Leblanc (FRA)	Castorama	s.t.
4	Thomas Wegmüller (SUI)	Lotus–Festina	+ 18"
5	Frank Van Den Abeele (BEL)	Lotto–Mavic–MBK	+ 36"
6	Laurent Jalabert (FRA)	ONCE	+ 44"
7	Maurizio Fondriest (ITA)	Panasonic–Sportlife	s.t.
8	Luc Roosen (BEL)	Tulip Computers	s.t.
9	Rolf Sørensen (DEN)	Ariostea	s.t.
10	Erik Dekker (NED)	Buckler–Colnago–Decca	s.t.

General classification after Grand Prix Téléglobe

	Cyclist	Team	Points
1	Olaf Ludwig (GER)	Panasonic–Sportlife	101
2	Johan Museeuw (BEL)	Lotto–Mavic–MBK	74
3	Laurent Jalabert (FRA)	ONCE	73
4	Raúl Alcalá (MEX)	PDM–Ultima–Concorde	72
5	Davide Cassani (ITA)	Ariostea	69
6	Gilbert Duclos-Lassalle (FRA)	Z	64
7	Dirk De Wolf (BEL)	Gatorade–Chateau d'Ax	58
8	Federico Echave (ESP)	CLAS–Cajastur	56
9	Luc Roosen (BEL)	Tulip Computers	56
10	Massimo Ghirotto (ITA)	Carrera Jeans–Vagabond	55
10	Claudio Chiappucci (ITA)	Carrera Jeans–Vagabond	55
10	Thomas Wegmüller (SUI)	Lotus–Festina	55

* Duclos-Lassalle and Echave may have competed in less than the minimum races to be classified

10 October 1992 — Paris–Tours 286 km (177.7 mi)

	Cyclist	Team	Time
1	Hendrik Redant (BEL)	Lotto–Mavic–MBK	6h 07' 44"
2	Christian Henn (GER)	Team Telekom	+ 1"
3	Olaf Ludwig (GER)	Panasonic–Sportlife	+ 10"
4	Andrei Tchmil (BEL)	GB–MG Maglificio	s.t.
5	Laurent Jalabert (FRA)	ONCE	s.t.
6	Phil Anderson (AUS)	Motorola	+ 33"
7	Laurent Brochard (FRA)	Castorama	+ 34"
8	Frans Maassen (NED)	Buckler–Colnago–Decca	s.t.
9	Maurizio Fondriest (ITA)	Panasonic–Sportlife	s.t.
10	Edwig Van Hooydonck (BEL)	Buckler–Colnago–Decca	s.t.

General classification after Paris–Tours

	Cyclist	Team	Points
1	Olaf Ludwig (GER)	Panasonic–Sportlife	126
2	Laurent Jalabert (FRA)	ONCE	91
3	Johan Museeuw (BEL)	Lotto–Mavic–MBK	74
4	Raúl Alcalá (MEX)	PDM–Ultima–Concorde	72
5	Davide Cassani (ITA)	Ariostea	69
6	Gilbert Duclos-Lassalle (FRA)	Z	64
7	Hendrik Redant (BEL)	Lotto–Mavic–MBK	58
8	Dirk De Wolf (BEL)	Gatorade–Chateau d'Ax	58
9	Federico Echave (ESP)	CLAS–Cajastur	56
9	Maurizio Fondriest (ITA)	Panasonic–Sportlife	56
9	Luc Roosen (BEL)	Tulip Computers	56

* Duclos-Lassalle, Redant and Echave may have competed in less than the minimum races to be classified

17 October 1992 — Giro di Lombardia 241 km (149.8 mi)

	Cyclist	Team	Time
1	Tony Rominger (SUI)	CLAS–Cajastur	6h 07' 50"
2	Claudio Chiappucci (ITA)	Carrera Jeans–Vagabond	+ 41"
3	Davide Cassani (ITA)	Ariostea	+ 2' 50"
4	Raúl Alcalá (MEX)	PDM–Ultima–Concorde	+ 5' 15"
5	Rolf Sørensen (DEN)	Ariostea	+ 6' 53"
6	Beat Zberg (SUI)	Helvetia–Commodore	+ 7' 22"
7	Udo Bölts (GER)	Team Telekom	s.t.
8	Bo Hamburger (DEN)	TVM–Sanyo	+ 7' 32"
9	Davide Rebellin (ITA)	GB–MG Maglificio	+ 7' 44"
10	Stephen Hodge (AUS)	ONCE	s.t.

General classification after Giro di Lombardia

	Cyclist	Team	Points
1	Olaf Ludwig (GER)	Panasonic–Sportlife	126
2	Davide Cassani (ITA)	Ariostea	94
3	Raúl Alcalá (MEX)	PDM–Ultima–Concorde	92
4	Laurent Jalabert (FRA)	ONCE	91
5	Claudio Chiappucci (ITA)	Carrera Jeans–Vagabond	90
6	Johan Museeuw (BEL)	Lotto–Mavic–MBK	74
7	Tony Rominger (SUI)	CLAS–Cajastur	68
8	Gilbert Duclos-Lassalle (FRA)	Z	64
9	Hendrik Redant (BEL)	Lotto–Mavic–MBK	58
10	Dirk De Wolf (BEL)	Gatorade–Chateau d'Ax	58

* Duclos-Lassalle and Redant may have competed in less than the minimum races to be classified

24 October 1992 — Grand Prix des Nations 56.2 km (34.9 mi) (ITT)

	Cyclist	Team	Time
1	Johan Bruyneel (BEL)	ONCE	1h 09' 00"
2	Tony Rominger (SUI)	CLAS–Cajastur	+ 5"
3	Viatcheslav Ekimov (RUS)	Panasonic–Sportlife	+ 16"
4	Alex Zülle (SUI)	ONCE	+ 47"
5	Thomas Wegmüller (SUI)	Lotus–Festina	+ 49"
6	Arturas Kasputis (LIT)	Postobón–Manzana–Ryalcao	+ 58"
7	Gianni Bugno (ITA)	Gatorade–Chateau d'Ax	+ 1' 06"
8	Jelle Nijdam (NED)	Buckler–Colnago–Decca	+ 1' 21"
9	Melcior Mauri (ESP)	ONCE	+ 1' 48"
10	Dimitri Vassilichenko (RUS)	Lotus–Festina	+ 2' 28"

** The only riders gaining points in this event are:

Rominger (50 points); Ekimov (35 points); Ludwig (18 points); Durand (16 points); Cassani (14 points)

General classification after Grand Prix des Nations

	Cyclist	Team	Points
1	Olaf Ludwig (GER)	Panasonic–Sportlife	144
2	Tony Rominger (SUI)	CLAS–Cajastur	118
3	Davide Cassani (ITA)	Ariostea	108
4	Raúl Alcalá (MEX)	PDM–Ultima–Concorde	92
5	Laurent Jalabert (FRA)	ONCE	91
6	Viatcheslav Ekimov (RUS)	Panasonic–Sportlife	90
7	Claudio Chiappucci (ITA)	Carrera Jeans–Vagabond	90
8	Johan Museeuw (BEL)	Lotto–Mavic–MBK	74
9	Jacky Durand (FRA)	Castorama	66
10	Gilbert Duclos-Lassalle (FRA)	Z	64

* Durand and Duclos-Lassalle may have competed in less than the minimum races to be classified

== Final standings ==
=== Individual ===
For the first ten races, points are awarded to the top 12 classified riders. It is unclear if riders must start a minimum number of races to be classified.

The points are awarded for every race using the following system:

Position	1st	2nd	3rd	4th	5th	6th	7th	8th	9th	10th	11th	12th
Points	50	35	25	20	18	16	14	12	10	8	6	5

The last race awarded the same points but only some riders are eligible.

Pos.	Rider	Team	MSR	ToF	ROU	LBL	AGR	CSS	WIN	ZUR	TEL	TOU	LOM	NAT	Pts.
1	Olaf Ludwig (GER)	Panasonic–Sportlife	16	?	35	?	50	?	?	0	?	25	0	18	144
2	Tony Rominger (SUI)	CLAS–Cajastur	0	?	?	18	0	?	?	0	0	DNS	50	50	118
3	Davide Cassani (ITA)	Ariostea	0	?	?	20	0	14	0	0	35	0	25	14	108
4	Raúl Alcalá (MEX)	PDM–Ultima–Concorde	0	?	?	6	0	50	16	0	0	0	20	DNS	92
5	Laurent Jalabert (FRA)	ONCE	10	0	0	0	0	0	35	12	16	18	?	DNS	91
6	Viatcheslav Ekimov (RUS)	Panasonic–Sportlife	0	0	?	0	0	0	0	50	0	0	5	35	90
7	Claudio Chiappucci (ITA)	Carrera Jeans–Vagabond	0	?	DNS	0	0	35	20	0	0	DNS	35	DNS	90
8	Johan Museeuw (BEL)	Lotto–Mavic–MBK	25	0	14	0	35	?	0	0	?	DNS	?	DNS	74
9	Jacky Durand (FRA)	Castorama	0	50	0	?	0	?	?	?	?	0	?	16	66
10	Gilbert Duclos-Lassalle (FRA)	Z	?	0	50	?	14	?	?	?	?	?	?	DNS	64
11	Hendrik Redant (BEL)	Lotto–Mavic–MBK	?	?	8	?	?	?	?	?	?	50	?	DNS	58
12	Dirk De Wolf (BEL)	Gatorade–Chateau d'Ax	0	8	0	50	0	?	?	0	?	DNS	?	DNS	58
Race winners not eligible for general classification or out of top 12
Pos.	Rider	Team	MSR	ToF	ROU	LBL	AGR	CSS	WIN	ZUR	TEL	TOU	LOM	NAT	Pts.
?	Federico Echave (ESP)	CLAS–Cajastur	?	?	?	?	?	6	?	0	50	?	0	?	?
?	Massimo Ghirotto (ITA)	Carrera Jeans–Vagabond	0	0	?	?	?	5	50	0	0	0	0	DNS	55
?	Sean Kelly (IRL)	Lotus–Festina	50	0	0	0	0	0	0	0	0	?	0	DNS	50
?	Johan Bruyneel (BEL)	ONCE	0	?	?	?	?	?	?	0	0	?	0	0	0

Key
Colour	Result
Gold	Winner
Silver	2nd place
Bronze	3rd place
Green	Top ten position
Blue	Other points position
Purple	Out of points, retired
Red	Did not start (DNS)
White	unclear if retired or DNS

=== Teams ===
	Team	Points
1	Panasonic–Sportlife	68
2	Buckler–Colnago–Decca	67
3	Ariostea	61
4	Tulip Computers	57
5	PDM–Ultima–Concorde	46
