= CLAS–Cajastur =

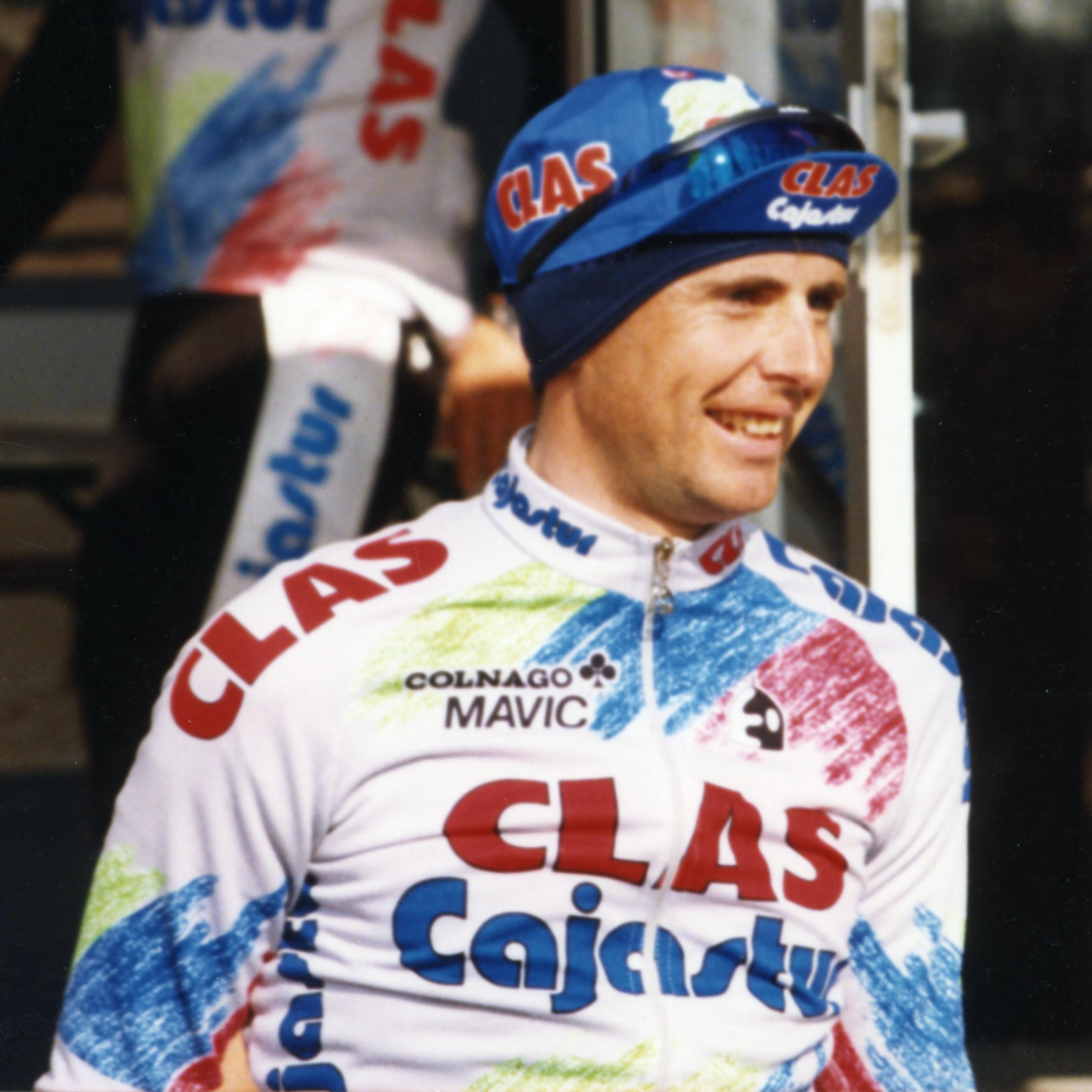
- Tony Rominger at the 1993 Paris–Nice

Team information
- UCI code: CLA
- Registered: Spain
- Founded: 1988
- Disbanded: 1993
- Discipline: Road

Team name history
- 1988–1989 1990–1993: CLAS; CLAS–Cajastur

CLAS–Cajastur (UCI team code: CLA) was a Spanish professional cycling team that existed from 1988 to 1993. Tony Rominger won the general classification of the 1992 and 1993 editions of the Vuelta a España with the team.

== History ==
Carlos Muñiz Menendez tested positive for Caffeine after Stage 1 of the 1990 Vuelta a Andalucia, because of this result he was not signed again by the team for the following season. Manuel Jorge Domínguez tested positive after Stage 12 of the 1992 Vuelta a España for Amineptine he was docked 10 minutes in the overall classification and placed last on the stage.

Tony Rominger joined the team in 1992 achieving his first of three wins at the Vuelta a España.

In 1994 the team merged with Mapei–Viner creating the Mapei–CLAS team.

== Final roster ==
As of 31 December 1993

Rider	Date of birth
Julio Coello (ESP)	18 February 1969 (aged 24)
Federico Echave (ESP)	20 July 1960 (aged 33)
Fernando Escartín (ESP)	24 January 1968 (aged 25)
Francisco Espinosa (ESP)	7 May 1962 (aged 31)
Manuel Fernández Ginés (ESP)	25 February 1971 (aged 22)
José Manuel Garcia (ESP)	26 March 1968 (aged 25)
Iñaki Gastón (ESP)	25 May 1963 (aged 30)
Arsenio González (ESP)	9 March 1960 (aged 33)
Francisco Javier Mauleon (ESP)	16 September 1965 (aged 28)
Jörg Müller (SUI)	23 January 1961 (aged 32)

Rider	Date of birth
Abraham Olano (ESP)	22 January 1970 (aged 23)
Miguel Ángel Peña (ESP)	8 July 1970 (aged 23)
Fabio Hernán Rodríguez (COL)	21 September 1966 (aged 27)
Tony Rominger (SUI)	27 March 1961 (aged 32)
José Roberto Sierra (ESP)	21 March 1967 (aged 26)
Jon Unzaga (ESP)	20 August 1962 (aged 31)
José Manuel Uría (ESP)	1 December 1969 (aged 24)
Xabier Usabiaga (ESP)	27 February 1969 (aged 24)
José Luis Villanueva Orihuela (ESP)	28 April 1965 (aged 28)

== Major wins ==
1988
Stage 1 Vuelta a Cantabria, Casimiro Moreda
Stage 9 Volta a Portugal, Manuel Cunha
Stage 7 Vuelta a Murcia, Casimiro Moreda
1989
Stage 5 Tour of the Basque Country, Casimiro Moreda
Stage 2a Grand Prix du Midi Libre, Casimiro Moreda
Trofeo Masferrer, Casimiro Moreda
Stage 4 Vuelta a La Rioja, Américo José Neves Da Silva
Stage 1 (TTT) Vuelta a Castilla y León
1990
Overall Setmana Catalana de Ciclisme, Iñaki Gastón
Klasika Primavera, Iñaki Gastón
Vuelta a España

Combination classification, Federico Echave
Stage 17, Federico Echave

Stage 4 (ITT) Vuelta a Aragon, Iñaki Gastón
Stage 1 Vuelta a los Valles Mineros, Federico Echave
Stage 5 Tour of Galicia, Federico Echave
Stage 5 Volta a Catalunya, Iñaki Gastón
1991
Stage 3 Volta a la Comunitat Valenciana, Federico Echave
Stage 4 Vuelta a Castilla y Leon, Francisco Espinosa
1992
Prologue & Stage 5 Paris–Nice, Tony Rominger
Overall Tour of the Basque Country, Tony Rominger

Stages 2 & 5b (ITT), Tony Rominger

Klasika Primavera, Federico Echave
Vuelta a España, Tony Rominger

Combination classification, Tony Rominger
Stage 8, Jon Unzaga
Stage 15, Francisco Javier Mauleón
Stages 19 (ITT) & 20, Tony Rominger

Stage 1a Vuelta Asturias, Tony Rominger
Stage 6 Volta a Catalunya, Tony Rominger
Subida al Naranco, Tony Rominger
Grand Prix Téléglobe, Federico Echave
Giro di Lombardia, Tony Rominger
Stage 1a Escalada a Montjuïc, Tony Rominger
Firenze–Pistoia, Tony Rominger

=== Supplementary statistics ===
Grand Tours by highest finishing position
Race	1988	1989	1990	1991	1992	1993
Vuelta a España	30	61	6	6	1	1
Giro d'Italia	–	–	5	13	–	–
Tour de France	–	–	–	33	19	2
Major week-long stage races by highest finishing position
Race	1988	1989	1990	1991	1992	1993
Paris–Nice	–	–	–	–	2	8
/ Tirreno–Adriatico	–	–	–	14	10	–
Volta a Catalunya	–	–	4	7	2	19
Tour of the Basque Country	24	25	4	8	1	1
Tour de Romandie	–	–	–	–	–	–
Critérium du Dauphiné	–	–	–	–	–	–
Tour de Suisse	–	–	–	–	–	3
Vuelta a Burgos	–	10	20	6	3	–
Ronde van Nederland	–	–	–	–	–	–
Monument races by highest finishing position
Monument	1988	1989	1990	1991	1992	1993
Milan–San Remo	–	–	–	16	21	19
Tour of Flanders	–	–	–	29	118	94
Paris–Roubaix	–	–	–	81	–	–
Liège–Bastogne–Liège	–	–	–	41	5	2
Giro di Lombardia	–	–	5	45	1	–
Classics by highest finishing position
Classic	1988	1989	1990	1991	1992	1993
Omloop Het Volk	–	–	DNF	57	–	–
E3 Harelbeke	–	–	–	15	–	–
Gent–Wevelgem	–	–	–	100	20	–
Amstel Gold Race	–	–	–	24	61	–
La Flèche Wallonne	–	–	–	9	–	–
Clásica de San Sebastián	32	–	5	5	11	4

Legend
—	Did not compete
DNF	Did not finish
