= 1992 Grand Prix Téléglobe =

1992 UCI Road World Cup

Race details
- Dates: October 4, 1992
- Stages: 1
- Distance: 224 km (139.2 mi)
- Winning time: 5h 50' 59"

Results
	Winner	Federico Echave (ESP)	(CLAS–Cajastur)
	Second	Davide Cassani (ITA)	(Ariostea)
	Third	Luc Leblanc (FRA)	(Castorama)

The 1992 Grand Prix Téléglobe was the 5th and final edition of the Grand Prix des Amériques cycle race and was held on October 4, 1992. The race started and finished in Montreal. The race was won by Federico Echave of the CLAS–Cajastur team.

== General classification ==
Final general classification

	Cyclist	Team	Time
1	Federico Echave (ESP)	CLAS–Cajastur	5h 50' 59"
2	Davide Cassani (ITA)	Ariostea	s.t.
3	Luc Leblanc (FRA)	Castorama	s.t.
4	Thomas Wegmüller (SUI)	Lotus–Festina	+ 18"
5	Frank Van Den Abeele (BEL)	Lotto–Mavic–MBK	+ 36"
6	Laurent Jalabert (FRA)	ONCE	+ 44"
7	Maurizio Fondriest (ITA)	Panasonic–Sportlife	s.t.
8	Luc Roosen (BEL)	Tulip Computers	s.t.
9	Rolf Sørensen (DEN)	Ariostea	s.t.
10	Erik Dekker (NED)	Buckler–Colnago–Decca	s.t.
