= 1992 Wincanton Classic =

Road cycling race

1992 UCI Road World Cup

Race details
- Dates: 16 August 1992
- Stages: 1
- Distance: 236.6 km (147.0 mi)
- Winning time: 6h 21' 23"

Results
| | Winner | Massimo Ghirotto (ITA) | (Carrera Jeans–Vagabond) |
| | Second | Laurent Jalabert (FRA) | (ONCE) |
| | Third | Bruno Cenghialta (ITA) | (Ariostea) |

The 1992 Wincanton Classic was the 4th edition of the Wincanton Classic cycle race (also known as Leeds International Classic and Rochester International Classic) and was held on 16 August. The race took place in and around Leeds. The race was won by Massimo Ghirotto of the Carrera Jeans–Vagabond team.

== Results ==
| | Cyclist | Team | Time |
|---|---|---|---|
| 1 | Massimo Ghirotto (ITA) | Carrera Jeans–Vagabond | 5h 58' 17" |
| 2 | Laurent Jalabert (FRA) | ONCE | + 1' 10" |
| 3 | Bruno Cenghialta (ITA) | Ariostea | + 2' 14" |
| 4 | Claudio Chiappucci (ITA) | Carrera Jeans–Vagabond | + 2' 36" |
| 5 | Fabian Jeker (SUI) | Helvetia–Commodore | s.t. |
| 6 | Raúl Alcalá (MEX) | PDM–Ultima–Concorde | + 3' 04" |
| 7 | Steven Rooks (NED) | Buckler–Colnago–Decca | s.t. |
| 8 | Scott Sunderland (AUS) | TVM–Sanyo | s.t. |
| 9 | Alex Zülle (SUI) | ONCE | s.t. |
| 10 | Luc Roosen (BEL) | Tulip Computers | s.t. |
