= Tony Rominger =

Swiss cyclist (born 1961)

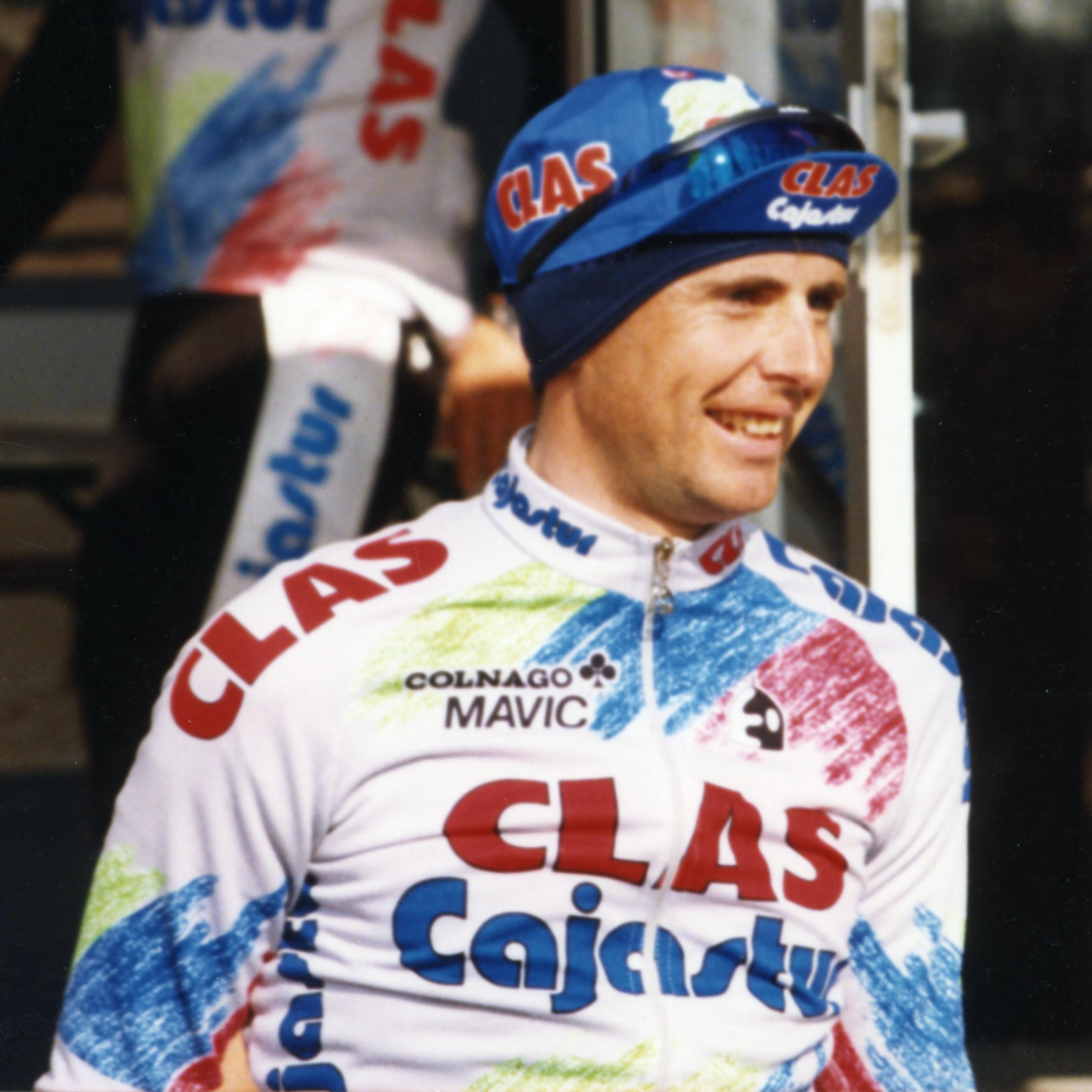
- Rominger at the 1993 Paris–Nice

Personal information
- Full name: Tony Rominger
- Born: 27 March 1961 (age 65) Vejle, Denmark
- Height: 1.75 m (5 ft 9 in)
- Weight: 65 kg (143 lb; 10 st 3 lb)

Cycling career
- Sport: Cycling
- Current team: Retired
- Discipline: Road
- Role: Rider
- Rider type: All-rounder

Professional teams
- 1986: Cilo–Aufina–Gemeaz Cusin
- 1987–1990: Supermercati Brianzoli–Chateau d'Ax
- 1991: Toshiba
- 1992–1993: CLAS–Cajastur
- 1994–1996: Mapei–CLAS
- 1997: Cofidis

Major wins
- Grand Tours Tour de France Mountains classification (1993) 3 individual stages (1993) Giro d'Italia General classification (1995) Points classification (1995) Intergiro classification (1995) 5 individual stages (1988, 1995) Vuelta a España General classification (1992, 1993, 1994) Points classification (1993) Mountains classification (1993, 1996) Combination classification (1992) 13 individual stages (1992, 1993, 1994, 1996) Stage races Tour of the Basque Country (1992, 1993, 1994) Paris–Nice (1991, 1994) Tirreno–Adriatico (1989, 1990) Tour de Romandie (1991, 1995) One-day races and Classics Giro di Lombardia (1989, 1992) Other Vélo d'Or (1994) Hour record 55.291 km (5 November 1994)

Tony Rominger (born 27 March 1961) is a Swiss former professional road racing cyclist who won the Vuelta a España in 1992, 1993 and 1994 and the Giro d'Italia in 1995.

== Career ==
Rominger grew up in Menzingen in the canton of Zug, but began cycling late, spurred by competition with his younger brother, Lars, and gained his first professional victory at the age of 23 years-old.

Rominger's strengths were time-trialling, climbing and recuperation. Rominger displayed his aptitude for stage races by winning back-to-back at the 1989 and 1990 Tirreno–Adriatico, and by winning the 1991 Paris-Nice. In one-day races, Rominger rode solo for over 100 kilometres to win the 1989 Giro di Lombardia, and placed second overall to Sean Kelly in the 1989 UCI Road World Cup standings.

Rominger secured three consecutive wins in the Vuelta a España between 1992 and 1994, a record at the time, which included the record for the most individual time trial victories. In 2005, Roberto Heras broke the overall wins record with a fourth title, although not consecutive. However, two months later he tested positive for the blood-boosting drug EPO and was disqualified. Heras' win was later reinstated on appeal, after he claimed inaccuracies in the testing and improper handling of his samples.

Rominger was a rival to Miguel Indurain in the Tour de France and was placed second in 1993 having won the final time trial, as well as winning the mountains classification. Expected to challenge again the following year, Rominger publicly conceded defeat to Indurain after falling over four minutes behind with ten stages remaining, despite luring second overall. He abandoned the Tour after losing more time in the Pyrenees.

In the latter part of 1994, Rominger won the Grand Prix des Nations, and broke the world hour record twice in a few days. For his attempt on the hour record in 1994, he was coached by Dr Michele Ferrari, who was at the trackside during the ride, and with whom he had worked closely for the previous eight years.

He used Bordeaux velodrome to ride 53.832 km and then 55.291 km, although a track novice. His first mark in October 1994 was 792m more than the previous record set by Miguel Indurain on the same track the month prior, with Romiger riding close to a second faster than Indurain for every kilometre. The first mark was carried out behind closed doors and had been only regarded as a warm-up. Of his rivalry with Indurain, Rominger said in 1995, "To defeat him is not an obsession with me. He is a kind guy and I cannot see him as an enemy".

Rominger won the 1995 Tour de Romandie in spring, and dominated the 1995 Giro d'Italia, taking the overall lead after winning the second stage time trial, and not relinquishing it over the remaining three weeks, winning four stages in total. He was joined on the podium by defending champion Evgeni Berzin and his Latvian teammate Piotr Ugrumov. Rominger's average speed of 23.9 mph was the fastest edition of the race since that won by Francesco Moser in 1984.

At age 36, he announced he would retire prior to racing a final year in 1997. At the Tour de France that year he placed fifth overall in the prologue, but finished the race on a stretcher after breaking his collarbone early in the race in Plumelec. The incident also ended his plans to make a last attempt to regain the one hour distance record from Chris Boardman.

He retired with 120 professional victories. After his cycling career, Rominger became the agent of young athletes, including the Austrian racing cyclist Matthias Brändle.

== Personal life ==
Rominger is multi-lingual, speaking French, German, Italian, Danish, Spanish and English.

By 1995, he was married with two children and lived in Monaco. He later married Swiss singer Francine Jordi.

== Career achievements ==
=== Major results ===
1984
6th Overall Grand Prix Guillaume Tell
1985
10th Grand Prix des Nations
1986
5th Grand Prix des Nations
8th Firenze–Pistoia
1987
1st Giro della Provincia di Reggio Calabria
3rd Overall Tirreno–Adriatico
3rd Overall Giro del Trentino
3rd Milano–Torino
5th Overall Tour Méditerranéen
8th Coppa Placci
9th Grand Prix des Nations
9th Firenze–Pistoia
1988
1st Giro dell'Emilia
1st Firenze–Pistoia
1st Stage 13 Giro d'Italia
2nd Overall Tirreno–Adriatico
2nd Overall Tour de Romandie

1st Prologue

2nd Overall Giro del Trentino

1st Stage 2

2nd Giro del Lazio
3rd Züri-Metzgete
5th Giro di Lombardia
7th Overall Tour Méditerranéen

1st Stage 5 (ITT)

1989
1st Overall Tirreno–Adriatico
1st Overall Tour Méditerranéen

1st Stage 4b (ITT)

1st Giro di Lombardia
1st Firenze–Pistoia
2nd UCI Road World Cup
3rd Clásica de San Sebastián
3rd Milano–Torino
4th Giro dell'Emilia
5th Overall Volta a Catalunya
6th Overall Tour de Romandie
7th Züri-Metzgete
1990
1st Overall Tirreno–Adriatico

1st Stage 2

2nd Overall Tour Méditerranéen

1st Stage 4

2nd Overall Setmana Catalana de Ciclisme
3rd Grand Prix des Nations
4th Overall Critérium du Dauphiné Libéré

1st Stage 3

4th Clásica de San Sebastián
4th Tour du Haut Var
4th Trofeo Baracchi
1991
1st Overall Paris–Nice

1st Stages 1 (TTT), 5 & 7 (ITT)

1st Overall Tour de Romandie

1st Stages 2 & 5b (ITT)

1st Grand Prix des Nations (Trofeo Baracchi)
1st Firenze–Pistoia
2nd Overall Tour Méditerranéen
2nd Milano–Torino
3rd Overall Critérium du Dauphiné Libéré

1st Stage 8 (ITT)

6th Grand Prix des Amériques
1992
1st Overall Vuelta a España

1st Combination classification
1st Stages 19 (ITT) & 20

1st Overall Tour of the Basque Country

1st Stages 2 & 5b (ITT)

1st Giro di Lombardia
1st Firenze–Pistoia
1st Subida al Naranco
2nd UCI Road World Cup
2nd Overall Paris–Nice

1st Prologue & Stage 5

2nd Overall Volta a Catalunya

1st Mountains classification
1st Stage 6

2nd Overall Vuelta Asturias

1st Stage 1a

2nd Overall Escalada a Montjuïc

1st Stage 1b (ITT)

2nd Grand Prix des Nations
3rd Milano–Torino
4th Overall Tour of Galicia
4th Road race, UCI Road World Championships
5th Liège–Bastogne–Liège
1993
1st Overall Vuelta a España

1st Points classification
1st Mountains classification
1st Stages 11, 14 & 19

1st Overall Tour of the Basque Country

1st Stages 1, 4 & 5b (ITT)

1st Subida a Urkiola
1st Polynormande
2nd Overall Tour de France

1st Mountains classification
1st Stages 10, 11 & 19 (ITT)

2nd Overall Critérium International

1st Stage 2

2nd Liège–Bastogne–Liège
5th Telekom Grand Prix (with Olaf Ludwig)
8th Overall Paris–Nice
1994
Best human effort: 55.291 km (5 Nov 1994)
Best human effort: 53.832 km (22 Oct 1994)
1st Overall Vuelta a España

1st Stages 1 (ITT), 6, 8 (ITT), 11, 14 & 20 (ITT)

1st Overall Tour of the Basque Country

1st Stages 3 & 5b (ITT)

1st Overall Paris–Nice

1st Stage 8b (ITT)

1st Overall Escalada a Montjuich

1st Stages 1a & 1b (ITT)

1st Grand Prix Eddy Merckx
1st Grand Prix des Nations
1st Telekom Grand Prix (with Jens Lehmann)
2nd Overall Critérium International
3rd Overall Volta a la Comunitat Valenciana
6th Liège–Bastogne–Liège
6th Milano–Torino
1995
1st Overall Giro d'Italia

1st Points classification
1st Intergiro classification
1st Stages 2 (ITT), 4, 10 (ITT) & 17 (ITT)

1st Overall Tour de Romandie

1st Prologue, Stages 3 & 5b (ITT)

1st Telekom Grand Prix (with Andrea Chiurato)
1st Stage 3 Giro del Trentino
3rd Overall Tour of the Basque Country

1st Stage 4

3rd Grand Prix Eddy Merckx
8th Overall Tour de France
1996
1st Overall Vuelta a Burgos

1st Stages 2 & 4 (ITT)

1st À travers Lausanne
2nd Overall Critérium du Dauphiné Libéré
UCI Road World Championships

3rd Time trial
9th Road race

3rd Overall Vuelta a España

1st Mountains classification
1st Stages 10 (ITT) & 21 (ITT)

3rd Overall Tour DuPont
4th Overall Euskal Bizikleta
5th Overall Vuelta a Aragón
5th Overall Escalada a Montjuich
5th Time trial, Olympic Games
6th Subida al Naranco
10th Overall Tour de France
1997
2nd Chrono des Herbiers
3rd Overall Circuit de la Sarthe
4th Time trial, UCI Road World Championships
5th Subida al Naranco

==== General classification results timeline ====
Grand Tour general classification results
Grand Tour	1986	1987	1988	1989	1990	1991	1992	1993	1994	1995	1996	1997
Giro d'Italia	97	DNF	44	DNF	—	—	—	—	—	1	—	—
Tour de France	—	—	68	—	57	—	—	2	DNF	8	10	DNF
Vuelta a España	—	—	—	—	16	—	1	1	1	—	3	38
Major stage race general classification results
Major stage race	1986	1987	1988	1989	1990	1991	1992	1993	1994	1995	1996	1997
Paris–Nice	—	—	—	—	—	1	2	8	1	—	—	35
/ Tirreno–Adriatico	—	3	2	1	1	—	—	—	—	—	—	—
Tour of the Basque Country	—	—	—	—	—	—	1	1	1	3	49	—
Tour de Romandie	—	—	2	6	—	1	—	—	—	1	—	28
Critérium du Dauphiné	—	—	—	—	4	3	—	—	—	—	2	—
Tour de Suisse	31	60	—	24	—	—	—	44	35	—	—	36
Volta a Catalunya	—	—	—	5	—	—	2	49	—	—	—	—

Legend
—	Did not compete
DNF	Did not finish

Awards
Preceded by Hippolyt Kempf	Swiss Sportsman of the Year; 1989	Succeeded by Daniel Giubellini
Preceded by Werner Günthör	Swiss Sportsman of the Year; 1992–1994	Succeeded by Donghua Li
