= 1993 Tour of the Basque Country =

Race details
- Dates: 5–9 April 1993
- Stages: 5
- Distance: 881.5 km (547.7 mi)
- Winning time: 22h 59' 55"

Results
	Winner	Tony Rominger (SUI)	(CLAS–Cajastur)
	Second	Rolf Sørensen (DEN)	(Carrera Jeans–Tassoni)
	Third	Alex Zülle (SUI)	(ONCE)

The 1993 Tour of the Basque Country was the 33rd edition of the Tour of the Basque Country cycle race and was held from 5 April to 9 April 1993. The race started in Errenteria and finished at the Santa Barbara Hermitage outside Urretxu. The race was won by Tony Rominger of the CLAS–Cajastur team.

== General classification ==
Final general classification

Rank	Rider	Team	Time
1	Tony Rominger (SUI)	CLAS–Cajastur	22h 59' 55"
2	Rolf Sørensen (DEN)	Carrera Jeans–Tassoni	+ 8"
3	Alex Zülle (SUI)	ONCE	+ 23"
4	Pascal Richard (SUI)	Ariostea	+ 59"
5	Uwe Ampler (GER)	Team Telekom	+ 1' 03"
6	Davide Cassani (ITA)	Ariostea	+ 1' 15"
7	Giorgio Furlan (ITA)	Ariostea	+ 1' 25"
8	Erik Breukink (NED)	ONCE	+ 1' 28"
9	Vladimir Poulnikov (UKR)	Carrera Jeans–Tassoni	+ 1' 30"
10	Claudio Chiappucci (ITA)	Carrera Jeans–Tassoni	+ 1' 36"
