= 1992 Clásica de San Sebastián =

Race details
- Dates: 8 August 1992
- Stages: 1
- Distance: 234 km (145.4 mi)
- Winning time: 5h 58' 17"

Results
	Winner	Raúl Alcalá (MEX)	(PDM–Ultima–Concorde)
	Second	Claudio Chiappucci (ITA)	(Carrera Jeans–Vagabond)
	Third	Eddy Bouwmans (NED)	(Panasonic–Sportlife)

The 1992 Clásica de San Sebastián was the 12th edition of the Clásica de San Sebastián cycle race and was held on 8 August 1992. The race started and finished in San Sebastián. The race was won by Raúl Alcalá of the PDM team.

== General classification ==
Final general classification

Rank	Rider	Team	Time
1	Raúl Alcalá (MEX)	PDM–Ultima–Concorde	5h 58' 17"
2	Claudio Chiappucci (ITA)	Carrera Jeans–Vagabond	+ 1' 11"
3	Eddy Bouwmans (NED)	Panasonic–Sportlife	+ 1' 12"
4	Dimitri Konyshev (RUS)	TVM–Sanyo	+ 1' 12"
5	Luc Roosen (BEL)	Tulip Computers	+ 1' 12"
6	Max Sciandri (ITA)	Motorola	+ 1' 38"
7	Davide Cassani (ITA)	Ariostea	+ 1' 38"
8	Maurizio Fondriest (ITA)	Panasonic–Sportlife	+ 1' 38"
9	Jim Van De Laer (BEL)	Tulip Computers	+ 1' 38"
10	Enrique Alonso (ESP)	Lotus–Festina	+ 1' 38"
