= 1987 Milan–San Remo =

Race details
- Dates: 21 March 1987
- Stages: 1
- Distance: 294 km (183 mi)
- Winning time: 7h 00' 52"

Results
	Winner	Erich Maechler (SUI)	(Carrera Jeans–Vagabond)
	Second	Eric Vanderaerden (BEL)	(Panasonic–Isostar)
	Third	Guido Bontempi (ITA)	(Carrera Jeans–Vagabond)

The 1987 Milan–San Remo was the 78th edition of the Milan–San Remo cycle race and was held on 21 March 1987.

The race started in Milan and finished in San Remo. At the highest point of the race (Turchino), nine riders broke away (Nijdam, Maechler, Peiper, Pirard, de Vos, Willems, Rossi, Varocchi, Montani), building a lead of more than eight minutes, at one point. Approaching the final climbs, Peiper attacked from the break, and rode alone, until Maechler caught him, after the Cipressa. On the final climb (Poggio) Maechler, left Peiper behind, soloed onto the Via Roma, and won the 1987 Milan San Remo.

Race Result (1-10)

Result	Rider	Team	Time
1	Erich Maechler (SUI)	Carrera Jeans–Vagabond	7h 00' 52"
2	Eric Vanderaerden (BEL)	Panasonic–Isostar	+ 6"
3	Guido Bontempi (ITA)	Carrera Jeans–Vagabond	+ 8"
4	Sean Kelly (IRL)	Kas	+ 8"
5	Giuseppe Calcaterra (ITA)	Atala–Ofmega	+ 8"
6	Teun van Vliet (NED)	Panasonic–Isostar	+ 8"
7	Paul Popp (AUT)	Paini–Bottecchia–Sidi	+ 8"
8	Franco Chioccioli (ITA)	Gis Gelati–Jollyscarpe	+ 8"
9	Dag Erik Pedersen (NOR)	Ariostea–Gres	+ 8"
10	Rolf Sørensen (DEN)	Remac–Fanini	+ 8"
