= 1991 Tour de Suisse =

Race details
- Dates: 18–28 June 1991
- Stages: 10 + prologue
- Distance: 1,912 km (1,188 mi)
- Winning time: 50h 18' 20"

Results
	Winner	Luc Roosen (BEL)	(Tulip Computers)
	Second	Pascal Richard (SUI)	(Helvetia–La Suisse)
	Third	Andrew Hampsten (USA)	(Motorola)
	Points	Sean Kelly (IRL)	(PDM–Concorde–Ultima)
	Mountains	Andrew Hampsten (USA)	(Motorola)
	Combination	Olaf Ludwig (GER)	(Panasonic–Sportlife)
	Team	Z	

The 1991 Tour de Suisse was the 55th edition of the Tour de Suisse cycle race and was held from 18 June to 28 June 1991. The race started in St. Gallen and finished in Zürich. The race was won by Luc Roosen of the Tulip team.

== General classification ==
Final general classification

Rank	Rider	Team	Time
1	Luc Roosen (BEL)	Tulip Computers	50h 18' 20"
2	Pascal Richard (SUI)	Helvetia–La Suisse	+ 33"
3	Andrew Hampsten (USA)	Motorola	+ 2' 33"
4	Miguel Arroyo (MEX)	Z	+ 4' 11"
5	Robert Millar (GBR)	Z	+ 6' 33"
6	Eddy Bouwmans (NED)	Panasonic–Sportlife	+ 9' 25"
7	Giorgio Furlan (ITA)	Ariostea	+ 10' 42"
8	Bruno Cornillet (FRA)	Z	+ 13' 00"
9	Jérôme Simon (FRA)	Z	+ 14' 12"
10	Udo Bölts (GER)	Team Telekom	+ 14' 42"
