= Erich Maechler =

Swiss cyclist

Erich Mächler
Personal information
- Full name: Erich Mächler
- Born: 24 September 1960 (age 66) Hochdorf, Switzerland

Cycling career
- Sport: Cycling
- Discipline: Road
- Role: Rider

Professional teams
- 1982: Royal-Wrangler
- 1983–1984: Cilo–Aufina
- 1985–1991: Carrera–Inoxpran
- 1992: Helvetia–Fichtel & Sachs
- 1993: Jolly Componibili–Club 88
- 1994–1995: Parkpre–Tange
- 1994–1995: Inoac–Deki

Major wins
- Grand Tours Tour de France 1 individual stage (1986) 1 TTT stage (1987) Stage races Tirreno–Adriatico (1988) One-day races and Classics National Road Race Championships (1984) Milan–San Remo (1987)

Erich Mächler (also spelled Maechler) (born 24 September 1960 in Hochdorf) is a former professional Swiss cyclist. In the 1987 Tour de France, he wore the yellow jersey for 6 days. He was the Swiss National Road Race champion in 1984 and won the 1987 Milan–San Remo and the 1988 Tirreno–Adriatico.

== Major results ==
1982 (2 pro wins)
1st Tour du Nord-Ouest
1st Stage 8 Tour de Suisse
2nd Trofeo Luis Puig
6th Overall Tour Méditerranéen
1983 (1)
1st Grand Prix de Mendrisio
1st Stage 6 Tour de Suisse
2nd GP Lugano
3rd Grand Prix La Marseillaise
4th Züri-Metzgete
6th Road race, UCI Road World Championships
1984 (2)
1st Road race, National Road Championships
2nd Overall Tirreno–Adriatico

1st Stage 2

1985
2nd GP du canton d'Argovie
8th Trofeo Pantalica
1986 (2)
1st Stage 21 Tour de France
1st Stage 5 Critérium du Dauphiné Libéré
1987 (3)
1st Milan–San Remo
Tour de France

1st Stage 2 (TTT)
Held after Stages 3–9

Critérium du Dauphiné Libéré

1st Prologue & Stage 3b (ITT)

1st Stage 1b (TTT) Paris–Nice
1988 (7)
1st Overall Tirreno–Adriatico

1st Stages 2 & 6b (ITT)

1st Overall Volta a la Comunitat Valenciana

1st Stage 4b (ITT)

1st Volta al Camp Morverde
5th Overall Three Days of de Panne
8th Milan–San Remo
1989 (1)
8th Overall Tirreno–Adriatico

1st Stage 4

1990 (2)
1st Kika Klassik
2nd Overall Tour de Luxembourg

1st Stage 4

2nd Overall Volta a la Comunitat Valenciana
7th Tre Valli Varesine
1992 (1)
1st Tour du Nord-Ouest
1994
2nd Japan Cup

=== Grand Tour general classification results timeline ===
Grand Tour	1982	1983	1984	1985	1986	1987	1988	1989	1990	1991	1992	1993
Giro d'Italia	91	—	—	23	—	—	DNF	—	—	—	—	120
Tour de France	—	106	84	114	49	85	136	117	130	128	DNF	—
Vuelta a España	—	—	—	—	—	—	—	58	—	75	—	—

Legend
—	Did not compete
DNF	Did not finish
