= 1992 Züri-Metzgete =

1992 UCI Road World Cup

Race details
- Dates: 23 August 1992
- Stages: 1
- Distance: 240 km (149.1 mi)
- Winning time: 6h 00' 01"

Results
	Winner	Viatcheslav Ekimov (RUS)	(Panasonic–Sportlife)
	Second	Lance Armstrong (USA)	(Motorola)
	Third	Jan Nevens (BEL)	(Lotto–Mavic–MBK)

The 1992 Züri-Metzgete was the 77th edition of the Züri-Metzgete road cycling one day race. It was held on 23 August 1992 as part of the 1992 UCI Road World Cup. The race took place in and around Zürich and was won by Viatcheslav Ekimov of Russia.

== Result ==
Rank	Rider	Team	Time
1	Viatcheslav Ekimov (RUS)	Panasonic–Sportlife	6h 00' 01"
2	Lance Armstrong (USA)	Motorola	+ 15"
3	Jan Nevens (BEL)	Lotto–Mavic–MBK	s.t.
4	Guido Bontempi (ITA)	Carrera Jeans–Vagabond	+ 35"
5	Bruno Leali (ITA)	Mercatone Uno–Medeghini–Zucchini	s.t.
6	Marc Madiot (FRA)	Team Telekom	s.t.
7	Martin Earley (IRL)	PDM–Ultima–Concorde	s.t.
8	Laurent Jalabert (FRA)	ONCE	+ 59"
9	Adrie van der Poel (NED)	Tulip Computers	s.t.
10	Scott Sunderland (AUS)	TVM–Sanyo	s.t.
