= 1992 Milan–San Remo =

Race details
- Dates: 21 March 1992
- Stages: 1
- Distance: 294 km (183 mi)
- Winning time: 7h 31' 42"

Results
| | Winner | Sean Kelly (IRL) | (Lotus–Festina) |
| | Second | Moreno Argentin (ITA) | (Ariostea) |
| | Third | Johan Museeuw (BEL) | (Lotto–Mavic–MBK) |

The 1992 Milan–San Remo was the 83rd edition of the Milan–San Remo cycle race and was held on 21 March 1992. The race started in Milan and finished in San Remo. The race was won by Sean Kelly of the Lotus–Festina team.

== General classification ==
Final general classification

| Rank | Rider | Team | Time |
|---|---|---|---|
| 1 | Sean Kelly (IRL) | Lotus–Festina | 7h 31' 42" |
| 2 | Moreno Argentin (ITA) | Ariostea | + 0" |
| 3 | Johan Museeuw (BEL) | Lotto–Mavic–MBK | + 3" |
| 4 | Uwe Raab (GER) | PDM–Ultima–Concorde | + 3" |
| 5 | Scott Sunderland (AUS) | TVM–Sanyo | + 3" |
| 6 | Olaf Ludwig (GER) | Panasonic–Sportlife | + 3" |
| 7 | Nico Verhoeven (NED) | PDM–Ultima–Concorde | + 3" |
| 8 | Etienne De Wilde (BEL) | Team Telekom | + 3" |
| 9 | Laurent Jalabert (FRA) | ONCE | + 3" |
| 10 | Rolf Sørensen (DEN) | Ariostea | + 3" |
