= Firenze–Pistoia =

Italian road bicycle race

Race details
- Date: Late October
- Region: Tuscany, Italy
- English name: Florence–Pistoia
- Local name(s): Firenze–Pistoia (in Italian)
- Discipline: Road
- Competition: UCI Europe Tour
- Type: Single-day

History
- First edition: 1870
- Editions: 22
- Final edition: 2008
- First winner: Rynner Van Heste (USA)
- Most wins: Tony Rominger (SUI) (4 wins)
- Final winner: Andriy Hrivko (UKR)

The Firenze–Pistoia was a single-day road bicycle race held annually in Tuscany, Italy. It was an individual time trial between Prato and Quarrata, in the Province of Pistoia. After 2005, the race was organised as a 1.1 event on the UCI Europe Tour. It was cancelled due to organisation problems.

== Winners ==
Year	Country	Rider	Team
1870	United States	Rynner Van Heste	
1871–1984	No race		
1985	West Germany	Rolf Gölz	Del Tongo
1986	Poland	Lech Piasecki	Del Tongo
1987	Austria	Helmut Wechselberger	Paini–Bottecchia
1988	Switzerland	Tony Rominger	Chateau d'Ax
1989	Switzerland	Tony Rominger	Chateau d'Ax
1990	Poland	Lech Piasecki	Diana–Colnago
1991	Switzerland	Tony Rominger	Toshiba
1992	Switzerland	Tony Rominger	CLAS–Cajastur
1993	Italy	Maurizio Fondriest	Lampre–Polti
1994	Italy	Francesco Casagrande	Mercatone Uno–Medeghini
1995	Italy	Francesco Casagrande	Mercatone Uno–Saeco
1996	Italy	Marco Fincato	Roslotto–ZG Mobili
1997	No race		
1998	Italy	Marco Velo	Mercatone Uno–Bianchi
1999	Italy	Marco Velo	Mercatone Uno–Bianchi
2000	No race		
2001	Australia	Nathan O'Neill	Panaria–Fiordo
2002	Italy	Fabrizio Guidi	Team Coast
2003	Italy	Andrea Peron	Team CSC
2004	Ukraine	Sergiy Matveyev	Panaria–Margres
2005	Ukraine	Sergiy Matveyev	Panaria–Navigare
2006	No race		
2007	Russia	Boris Shpilevsky	Preti Mangimi
2008	Ukraine	Andriy Grivko	Team Milram
