= Rynner Van Heste =

American cyclist

Personal information
- Born: 26 July 1853 New York, New York, United States
- Died: 8 August 1931 (aged 78) New York, New York, United States

Cycling career
- Sport: Cycling
- Discipline: Road
- Role: Rider

Major wins
- Firenze–Pistoia (1870)

Rynner Van Heste (July 26, 1853 – August 8, 1931) was an American road cyclist.

In his career he won one of the oldest cycling races in Europe in 1870, Firenze–Pistoia.
