= Paul Aerts =

Belgian cyclist

Personal information
- Born: 16 December 1949 (age 76) Lier, Belgium

Cycling career
- Sport: Cycling
- Role: Rider

Paul Aerts (born 16 December 1949) is a Belgian racing cyclist. He rode in the 1972 Tour de France.
