= Bruno Cornillet =

French cyclist (born 1963)

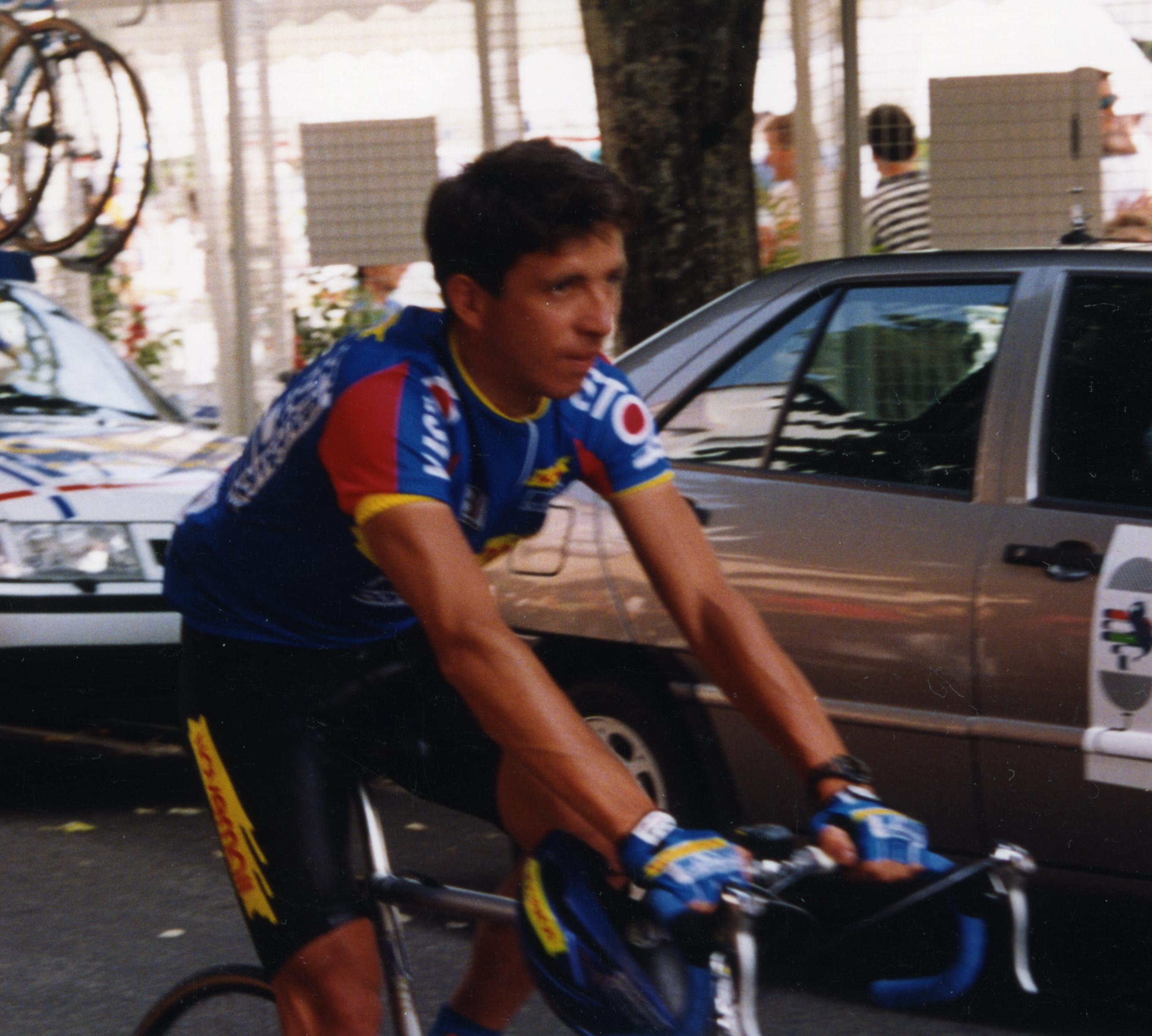
- Cornillet at the 1993 Tour de France

Personal information
- Full name: Bruno Cornillet
- Born: 8 February 1963 (age 63) Lamballe, France

Cycling career
- Sport: Cycling
- Current team: Retired
- Discipline: Road
- Role: Rider

Professional teams
- 1984–1985: La Vie Claire
- 1986–1992: Peugeot–Shell–Velo Talbot
- 1993–1994: Novemail–Histor–Laser Computer
- 1995: Chazal–König

Bruno Cornillet (born 8 February 1963, in Lamballe, Côtes-d'Armor) is a French former professional road bicycle racer.

== Major results ==
1983
3rd Chrono des Herbiers
3rd Duo Normand (with Roland Le Clerc)
1984
1st Overall Volta a la Comunitat Valenciana

1st Stage 1

3rd Paris–Camembert
4th Tour du Nord-Ouest
6th Overall Circuit de la Sarthe
8th Overall Tour du Limousin
9th GP du canton d'Argovie
1985
1st Stage 2 Paris–Bourges
3rd GP de la Ville de Rennes
3rd Trofeo Luis Puig
7th Overall Tour de l'Avenir
1986
1st Chateauroux-Limoges
1st Stage 2a Coors Classic
3rd Overall Tour de Romandie

1st Stage 4

3rd Overall Tour d'Armorique
6th Grand Prix d'Isbergues
9th Nice–Alassio
9th Tour du Haut Var
1987
1st Stage 3 Tour of Sweden
2nd Overall Tour du Limousin
5th Overall Critérium du Dauphiné Libéré

1st Stage 2

5th Amstel Gold Race
7th Overall Tour de Romandie
1988
2nd Overall Tour of Sweden
2nd Paris–Camembert
6th Tour du Haut Var
8th Amstel Gold Race
9th Overall Tour Méditerranéen
1989
1st Stage 4 Paris–Nice
2nd GP Ouest-France
4th Overall Tour of Sweden

1st Stage 6

5th Overall Tour d'Armorique
8th Wincanton Classic
8th Trofeo Laigueglia
9th Liège–Bastogne–Liège
9th Grand Prix de Wallonie
9th Züri-Metzgete
1990
1st GP Ouest-France
1st Stage 2b Tour of Ireland
2nd Overall Tour du Limousin

1st Stage 3

4th Overall Four Days of Dunkirk
4th Road race, National Road Championships
6th Overall Critérium du Dauphiné Libéré
8th Overall Tour de Romandie
1991
1st Overall Circuit de la Sarthe

1st Stages 2 & 4a (ITT)

1st A Travers le Morbihan
4th Giro di Lombardia
8th Overall Tour de Suisse
1992
1st Tour de Vendée
2nd Overall Paris–Bourges
3rd Grand Prix d'Isbergues
10th Overall Giro d'Italia
1993
1st Paris–Bourges
7th Clásica de San Sebastián
10th GP Ouest-France
1994
2nd Overall Tour du Limousin
4th GP Ouest-France
1995
10th Paris–Camembert

=== Grand Tour general classification results timeline ===
Grand Tour	1986	1987	1988	1989	1990	1991	1992	1993	1994	1995
Giro d'Italia	—	—	—	—	—	—	10	—	—	—
Tour de France	DNF	37	DNF	14	39	54	DNF	48	DNF	115
Vuelta a España	—	—	—	—	—	—	—	—	—	DNF

Legend
—	Did not compete
DNF	Did not finish
