= 1988 Tour du Haut Var =

Race details
- Dates: 27 February 1988
- Stages: 1
- Distance: 210 km (130.5 mi)
- Winning time: 5h 48' 54"

Results
	Winner	Luc Roosen (BEL)
	Second	Sean Kelly (IRL)
	Third	Etienne De Wilde (BEL)

The 1988 Tour du Haut Var was the 20th edition of the Tour du Haut Var cycle race and was held on 27 February 1988. The race started in Sainte-Maxime and finished in Grimaud. The race was won by Luc Roosen.

== General classification ==
Final general classification

Rank	Rider	Time
1	Luc Roosen (BEL)	5h 48' 54"
2	Sean Kelly (IRL)	+ 2"
3	Etienne De Wilde (BEL)	+ 2"
4	Luc Leblanc (FRA)	+ 2"
5	Marc Madiot (FRA)	+ 2"
6	Bruno Cornillet (FRA)	+ 18"
7	Joël Pelier (FRA)	+ 18"
8	Paul Haghedooren (BEL)	+ 18"
9	Patrice Esnault (FRA)	+ 26"
10	Patrick Jacobs (BEL)	+ 26"
