= 1989 Tour du Haut Var =

Race details
- Dates: 25 February 1989
- Stages: 1
- Distance: 200 km (124.3 mi)
- Winning time: 5h 40' 04"

Results
	Winner	Gérard Rué (FRA)
	Second	Roland Le Clerc (FRA)
	Third	Luc Roosen (BEL)

The 1989 Tour du Haut Var was the 21st edition of the Tour du Haut Var cycle race and was held on 25 February 1989. The race started in Seillans and finished in Draguignan. The race was won by Gérard Rué.

== General classification ==
Final general classification

Rank	Rider	Time
1	Gérard Rué (FRA)	5h 40' 04"
2	Roland Le Clerc (FRA)	+ 3' 20"
3	Luc Roosen (BEL)	+ 3' 56"
4	Etienne De Wilde (BEL)	+ 3' 56"
5	Éric Caritoux (FRA)	+ 3' 56"
6	Jean-Philippe Vandenbrande (BEL)	+ 3' 56"
7	Laurent Fignon (FRA)	+ 3' 56"
8	Christophe Lavainne (FRA)	+ 3' 56"
9	Marc Sergeant (BEL)	+ 3' 56"
10	André Lurquin (BEL)	+ 3' 56"
