= 1990 Tour de Romandie =

Race details
- Dates: 8–13 May 1990
- Stages: 5 + Prologue
- Distance: 859 km (534 mi)
- Winning time: 22h 20' 01"

Results
	Winner	Charly Mottet (FRA)	(RMO)
	Second	Robert Millar (GBR)	(Z–Tomasso)
	Third	Luc Roosen (BEL)	(Histor–Sigma)

The 1990 Tour de Romandie was the 44th edition of the Tour de Romandie cycle race and was held from 8 May to 13 May 1990. The race started in Moutier and finished in Geneva. The race was won by Charly Mottet of the RMO team.

== General classification ==
Final general classification
Rank	Rider	Team	Time
1	Charly Mottet (FRA)	RMO	22h 20' 01"
2	Robert Millar (GBR)	Z–Tomasso	+ 2' 00"
3	Luc Roosen (BEL)	Histor–Sigma	+ 2' 10"
4	Michael Wilson (AUS)	Helvetia–La Suisse	+ 2' 41"
5	Stephen Hodge (AUS)	ONCE	+ 3' 08"
6	Pascal Simon (FRA)	Castorama	+ 3' 39"
7	Jérôme Simon (FRA)	Z–Tomasso	+ 3' 45"
8	Bruno Cornillet (FRA)	Z–Tomasso	+ 4' 52"
9	Rolf Järmann (SUI)	Frank–Toyo	+ 4' 55"
10	Fabian Fuchs (SUI)	Buckler–Colnago–Decca	+ 5' 23"
