= 1992 Tour of the Basque Country =

Race details
- Dates: 6–10 April 1992
- Stages: 5
- Distance: 806.1 km (500.9 mi)
- Winning time: 20h 56' 57"

Results
	Winner	Tony Rominger (SUI)	(CLAS–Cajastur)
	Second	Raúl Alcalá (MEX)	(PDM–Ultima–Concorde)
	Third	Mikel Zarrabeitia (ESP)	(Amaya Seguros)

The 1992 Tour of the Basque Country was the 32nd edition of the Tour of the Basque Country cycle race and was held from 6 April to 10 April 1992. The race started in Orio and finished in Larraitz. The race was won by Tony Rominger of the CLAS–Cajastur team.

== General classification ==
Final general classification

Rank	Rider	Team	Time
1	Tony Rominger (SUI)	CLAS–Cajastur	20h 56' 57"
2	Raúl Alcalá (MEX)	PDM–Ultima–Concorde	+ 40"
3	Mikel Zarrabeitia (ESP)	Amaya Seguros	+ 47"
4	Alex Zülle (SUI)	ONCE	+ 52"
5	Julián Gorospe (ESP)	Banesto	+ 55"
6	Stephen Roche (IRL)	Carrera Jeans–Vagabond	+ 59"
7	Ronan Pensec (FRA)	RMO	+ 1' 00"
8	Erik Breukink (NED)	PDM–Ultima–Concorde	+ 1' 11"
9	Johan Bruyneel (BEL)	ONCE	+ 1' 24"
10	Steven Rooks (NED)	Buckler–Colnago–Decca	+ 1' 24"
