= 1988 Tirreno–Adriatico =

Race details
- Dates: 11–16 March 1988
- Stages: 6
- Distance: 929.3 km (577.4 mi)
- Winning time: 24h 46' 34"

Results
	Winner	Erich Maechler (SUI)	(Carrera Jeans–Vagabond)
	Second	Tony Rominger (SUI)	(Chateau d'Ax)
	Third	Rolf Sørensen (DEN)	(Ariostea–Gres)

The 1988 Tirreno–Adriatico was the 23rd edition of the Tirreno–Adriatico cycle race and was held from 11 March to 16 March 1988. The race started in Bacoli and finished in San Benedetto del Tronto. The race was won by Erich Maechler of the Carrera team.

== General classification ==
Final general classification

Rank	Rider	Team	Time
1	Erich Maechler (SUI)	Carrera Jeans–Vagabond	24h 46' 34"
2	Tony Rominger (SUI)	Chateau d'Ax	+ 16"
3	Rolf Sørensen (DEN)	Ariostea–Gres	+ 21"
4	Eric Vanderaerden (BEL)	Panasonic–Isostar–Colnago–Agu	+ 28"
5	Edwig Van Hooydonck (BEL)	Superconfex–Yoko–Opel–Colnago	+ 36"
6	Maurizio Fondriest (ITA)	Alfa Lum–Legnano–Ecoflam	+ 41"
7	Phil Anderson (AUS)	TVM–Van Schilt	+ 43"
8	Michael Wilson (AUS)	Weinmann–La Suisse–SMM Uster	+ 49"
9	Luca Gelfi (ITA)	Del Tongo	+ 52"
10	Giuseppe Petito (ITA)	GIS–Ecoflam–Jolly	+ 56"
