= 1992 Liège–Bastogne–Liège =

Race details
- Dates: 19 April 1992
- Stages: 1
- Distance: 262 km (163 mi)
- Winning time: 7h 18' 06"

Results
	Winner	Dirk De Wolf (BEL)	(Gatorade–Chateau d'Ax)
	Second	Steven Rooks (NED)	(Buckler–Colnago–Decca)
	Third	Jean-François Bernard (FRA)	(Banesto)

The 1992 Liège–Bastogne–Liège was the 78th edition of the Liège–Bastogne–Liège cycle race and was held on 19 April 1992. It started in Liège and finished in Ans. With Dirk De Wolf of the Gatorade team claiming victory.

== General classification ==
Final general classification

Rank	Rider	Team	Time
1	Dirk De Wolf (BEL)	Gatorade–Chateau d'Ax	7h 18' 06"
2	Steven Rooks (NED)	Buckler–Colnago–Decca	+ 30"
3	Jean-François Bernard (FRA)	Banesto	+ 30"
4	Davide Cassani (ITA)	Ariostea	+ 1' 35"
5	Tony Rominger (SUI)	CLAS–Cajastur	+ 2' 00"
6	Gérard Rué (FRA)	Castorama	+ 2' 00"
7	Gert-Jan Theunisse (NED)	TVM–Sanyo	+ 2' 00"
8	Giorgio Furlan (ITA)	Ariostea	+ 2' 00"
9	Robert Millar (GBR)	TVM–Sanyo	+ 2' 07"
10	Edwig Van Hooydonck (BEL)	Buckler–Colnago–Decca	+ 2' 12"
