= 1991 Paris–Nice =

Race details
- Dates: 10–17 March 1991
- Stages: 7 + Prologue
- Distance: 959.5 km (596.2 mi)
- Winning time: 24h 09' 19"

Results
Jersey awarded to the overall winner	Winner	Tony Rominger (SUI)	(Toshiba)
	Second	Laurent Jalabert (FRA)	(Toshiba)
	Third	Martial Gayant (FRA)	(Toshiba)

The 1991 Paris–Nice was the 49th edition of the Paris–Nice cycle race and was held from 10 March to 17 March 1991. The race started in Fontenay-sous-Bois and finished at the Col d'Èze. The race was won by Tony Rominger of the Toshiba team.

== Route ==
Stage characteristics and winners
Stage	Date	Course	Distance	Type	Winner
P	10 March	Fontenay-sous-Bois	6.5 km (4.0 mi)	Individual time trial	Thierry Marie (FRA)
1	11 March	Nevers to Nevers	47 km (29 mi)	Team time trial	Toshiba
2	12 March	Cusset to Saint-Étienne	157 km (98 mi)		Andreas Kappes (GER)
3	13 March	Saint-Étienne to Dieulefit	167 km (104 mi)		Viktor Klimov (URS)
4	14 March	Dieulefit to Marseille	223 km (139 mi)		Jean-Paul van Poppel (NED)
5	15 March	Marseille to Toulon/Mont Faron	164 km (102 mi)		Tony Rominger (SUI)
6	16 March	Toulon to Mandelieu-la-Napoule	183 km (114 mi)		Uwe Ampler (GER)
7	17 March	Nice to Col d'Èze	12 km (7.5 mi)	Individual time trial	Tony Rominger (SUI)

== General classification ==
Final general classification

Rank	Rider	Team	Time
1	Tony Rominger (SUI)	Toshiba	24h 09' 19"
2	Laurent Jalabert (FRA)	Toshiba	+ 1' 55"
3	Martial Gayant (FRA)	Toshiba	+ 2' 27"
4	Stephen Roche (IRL)	Tonton Tapis–GB	+ 2' 39"
5	Andrew Hampsten (USA)	Motorola	+ 2' 41"
6	Jérôme Simon (FRA)	Z	+ 2' 53"
7	Claude Criquielion (BEL)	Lotto	+ 3' 16"
8	Éric Caritoux (FRA)	RMO	+ 3' 20"
9	Atle Kvålsvoll (NOR)	Z	+ 3' 49"
10	Laurent Fignon (FRA)	Castorama–Raleigh	+ 4' 16"
