= 1992 Tour of Flanders =

1992 cycle race

76th Tour of Flanders
1992 UCI Road World Cup, race 2

Race details
- Dates: 5 April 1992
- Stages: 1
- Distance: 260 km (161.6 mi)
- Winning time: 6h 37' 19"

Results
	Winner	Jacky Durand (FRA)	(Castorama)
	Second	Thomas Wegmüller (SUI)	(Lotus–Festina)
	Third	Edwig Van Hooydonck (BEL)	(Buckler–Colnago–Decca)

The 76th running of the Tour of Flanders cycling classic was held on Sunday, 5 April 1992. French rider Jacky Durand gained an upset victory. For the first time in the Tour of Flanders' history, a rider from the early breakaway stayed ahead until the finish. The race was the second leg of the UCI Road World Cup. 123 of 186 riders finished.

== Route ==
The race started in Sint-Niklaas and finished in Meerbeke (Ninove) – totaling 260 km.
The course featured 14 categorized climbs:

- Tiegemberg
- Oude Kwaremont
- Paterberg
- Hoogberg-Hotond
- Kruisberg
- Taaienberg
- Eikenberg
- Volkegemberg
- Varent
- Leberg
- Molenberg
- Berendries
- Muur-Kapelmuur
- Bosberg

== Results ==
Result
Rank	Rider	Team	Time
1	Jacky Durand (FRA)	Castorama	6h 37' 19"
2	Thomas Wegmüller (SUI)	Lotus–Festina	+ 48"
3	Edwig Van Hooydonck (BEL)	Buckler–Colnago–Decca	+ 1' 44"
4	Maurizio Fondriest (ITA)	Panasonic–Sportlife	s.t.
5	Frans Maassen (NED)	Buckler–Colnago–Decca	+ 1' 57"
6	Jelle Nijdam (NED)	Buckler–Colnago–Decca	s.t.
7	Marc Madiot (FRA)	Team Telekom	s.t.
8	Jesper Skibby (DEN)	TVM–Sanyo	s.t.
9	Franco Ballerini (ITA)	GB–MG Maglificio	s.t.
10	Dirk De Wolf (BEL)	Chateau d'Ax	s.t.
