= 1992 Giro di Lombardia =

Race details
- Dates: 17 October 1992
- Stages: 1
- Distance: 241 km (149.8 mi)
- Winning time: 6h 07' 50"

Results
	Winner	Tony Rominger (SUI)	(CLAS–Cajastur)
	Second	Claudio Chiappucci (ITA)	(Carrera Jeans–Vagabond)
	Third	Davide Cassani (ITA)	(Ariostea)

The 1992 Giro di Lombardia was the 86th edition of the Giro di Lombardia cycle race and was held on 17 October 1992. The race started and finished in Monza. The race was won by Tony Rominger of the CLAS–Cajastur team.

== General classification ==
Final general classification

Rank	Rider	Team	Time
1	Tony Rominger (SUI)	CLAS–Cajastur	6h 07' 50"
2	Claudio Chiappucci (ITA)	Carrera Jeans–Vagabond	+ 41"
3	Davide Cassani (ITA)	Ariostea	+ 2' 50"
4	Raúl Alcalá (MEX)	PDM–Ultima–Concorde	+ 5' 15"
5	Rolf Sørensen (DEN)	Ariostea	+ 6' 53"
6	Beat Zberg (SUI)	Helvetia–Commodore	+ 7' 22"
7	Udo Bölts (GER)	Team Telekom	s.t.
8	Bo Hamburger (DEN)	TVM–Sanyo	+ 7' 32"
9	Davide Rebellin (ITA)	GB–MG Maglificio	+ 7' 44"
10	Stephen Hodge (AUS)	ONCE	s.t.
