= 1989 Tirreno–Adriatico =

Race details
- Dates: 9–15 March 1989
- Stages: 7
- Distance: 1,070.9 km (665.4 mi)
- Winning time: 28h 37' 50"

Results
	Winner	Tony Rominger (SUI)	(Chateau d'Ax)
	Second	Rolf Gölz (FRG)	(Superconfex–Yoko–Opel–Colnago)
	Third	Charly Mottet (FRA)	(RMO)

The 1989 Tirreno–Adriatico was the 24th edition of the Tirreno–Adriatico cycle race and was held from 9 March to 15 March 1989. The race started in Bacoli and finished in San Benedetto del Tronto. The race was won by Tony Rominger of the Chateau d'Ax team.

== General classification ==
Final general classification

Rank	Rider	Team	Time
1	Tony Rominger (SUI)	Chateau d'Ax	28h 37' 50"
2	Rolf Gölz (FRG)	Superconfex–Yoko–Opel–Colnago	+ 34"
3	Charly Mottet (FRA)	RMO	+ 44"
4	Jesper Skibby (DEN)	TVM–Ragno	+ 59"
5	Michael Wilson (AUS)	Helvetia–La Suisse	+ 1' 14"
6	Greg LeMond (USA)	AD Renting–W-Cup–Bottecchia	+ 1' 40"
7	Sean Kelly (IRL)	PDM–Ultima–Concorde	+ 1' 50"
8	Erich Maechler (SUI)	Carrera Jeans–Vagabond	+ 1' 51"
9	Rudy Dhaenens (BEL)	PDM–Ultima–Concorde	+ 1' 52"
10	Maurizio Fondriest (ITA)	Del Tongo	+ 1' 53"
