= Olaf Ludwig =

East German racing cyclist

- Ludwig in 2025

Personal information
- Born: 13 April 1960 (age 66) Gera, Bezirk Gera, East Germany

Cycling career
- Sport: Cycling
- Discipline: Road
- Role: Rider
- Rider type: Sprinter

Amateur team
- 1979–1989: SG Wismut Gera

Professional teams
- 1990–1992: Panasonic
- 1993–1997: Team Telekom

Major wins
- Grand Tours Tour de France Points classification (1990) 3 individual stages (1990, 1992, 1993) Stage races Peace Race (1982, 1986) One-day races and Classics Olympic Road Race (1988) World Road Race Championships (1981) (Team time trial) Amstel Gold Race (1992) E3 Harelbeke (1991) Rund um den Henninger Turm (1994)
Medal record
Event	1st	2nd	3rd
Summer Olympics	1	1	0
Road World Championships	1	0	1
Track World Championships	0	1	0
Total	2	2	1
Representing East Germany
Men's road bicycle racing
Olympic Games
Gold medal – first place	1988 Seoul	Individual road race
Silver medal – second place	1980 Moscow	Team time trial
World Championships
Gold medal – first place	1981 Prague	Team time trial
Men's track cycling
World Championships
Silver medal – second place	1986 Colorado Springs	Amateur points race
Representing Germany
Men's road bicycle racing
World Championships
Bronze medal – third place	1993 Oslo	Road race

Olaf Ludwig (born 13 April 1960 in Gera, Bezirk Gera) is a former German racing cyclist. His career began at the SG Dynamo Gera / Sportvereinigung (SV) Dynamo. As an East German, he raced as an amateur until reunification of Germany allowed him to become professional with Panasonic team. As a sprinter, the highlight of his career was winning the points classification in the 1990 Tour de France. Other highlights include the Olympic road race in Seoul in 1988, the World Championship in the team time trial in Prague in 1981, a record 38 stage victories in the Peace Race, winning the Amstel Gold Race in 1992, and podium placings in the Paris–Roubaix. He also won the 1992 UCI Road World Cup. In 1992 he won the Champs-Élysées stage in the Tour de France and won the third Tour stage of his career the following year.

His sprinting rivals included Mario Cipollini, Wilfried Nelissen and Djamolidine Abdoujaparov.

In 1993 he joined Team Telekom, later T-Mobile Team. On retirement in 1996 he took up public relations for the team. He subsequently became principal team manager, but his involvement with the team finished at the end of 2006.

== Major results ==
1978
1st Team time trial, UCI Junior Road World Championships
1980
2nd Team time trial 1980 Olympic Road Race
1981
1st Team time trial 1981 UCI Road World Championships
1st Overall Niedersachsen-Rundfahrt
1982
1st Overall Peace Race
1983
1st Overall Tour de l'Avenir
1st Overall DDR Rundfahrt
1st GDR Road Cycling Championships - Mountain Climbing
1985
1st Overall DDR Rundfahrt
1986
1st Overall Peace Race
2nd Amateur's points race 1986 UCI Track Cycling World Championships
1st GDR Track Cycling Championships - Points race
1st GDR Road Cycling Championships - Road race
1987
1st GDR Track Cycling Championships - Points race
1988
1st 1988 Olympic Road race
1989
1st GDR Road Cycling Championships - Road race
1990
Tour de France

1st Points classification
1st Stage 8

Tour de Trump

1st Points classification
1st, Stage 1, 2 & 9

1st GDR Road Cycling Championships - Road race (professionals)
1991
1st E3 Prijs Vlaanderen
1992
1st Overall Four Days of Dunkirk
1st UCI Road World Cup
1st Kuurne–Brussels–Kuurne
1st Amstel Gold Race
1st Dwars door Vlaanderen
1st Grand Prix de Fourmies
1st Stage 21 Tour de France
2nd Paris–Roubaix
1993
3rd Men's road race 1993 UCI Road World Championships
1994
1st Rund um den Henninger Turm
1995
1st Veenendaal–Veenendaal
1996
1st Stage 2 Vuelta a Andalucía
3rd Overall Four Days of Dunkirk

1st Stage 1

3rd Overall Three Days of De Panne

1st Stage 1

3rd Omloop Het Volk

== Significant Placements ==
		1980	1981	1982	1983	1984	1985	1986	1987	1988	1989
Summer; Olympics	Road cycling	32				—				1	
Summer; Olympics	Team time trial	2				—				—	
Summer; Olympics	Points race	—				—				14	
World; Championships	Road cycling		DNF	62	6		53	8	24		—
World; Championships	Team time trial		1	4	10		—	—	—		—
World; Championships	Points race		—	—	—		—	2	4		—

		1990	1991	1992	1993	1994	1995	1996
Summer; Olympics	Road cycling			—				16
Summer; Olympics	Team time trial			—				—
Summer; Olympics	Points race			—				—
World; Championships	Road cycling	—	DNF	DNF	3	—	—	—
World; Championships	Team time trial	—	—	—	—	—	—	—
World; Championships	Points race	—	—	—	—	—	—	—

Grand Tour	1990	1991	1992	1993	1994	1995
Giro d'Italia	—	—	—	—	—	—
Tour de France	141	114	96	DNF	105	DNF
Vuelta a España	—	DNF	—	—	—	—

Monument	1990	1991	1992	1993	1994	1995	1996
Milan–San Remo	—	—	6	98	125	—	116
Tour of Flanders	—	32	—	9	DNF	89	36
Paris–Roubaix	16	9	2	3	4	24	DNF
Liège–Bastogne–Liège	—	—	—	—	—	—	—
Giro di Lombardia	—	—	DNF	—	—	—	—

== Books ==
Olaf Ludwig: Höllenritt auf der Himmelsleiter. Etappen meines Lebens. Herausgegeben von Helmut Wengel. RhinoVerlag, Arnstadt & Weimar 1997, ISBN 3-932081-18-8 (german)

Awards
Preceded by Jens Weißflog	East German Sportsman of the Year; 1986	Succeeded by Torsten Voss
Preceded by Torsten Voss	East German Sportsman of the Year; 1988	Succeeded by Andreas Wecker
