= 1988 Giro di Lombardia =

Race details
- Dates: 15 October 1988
- Stages: 1
- Distance: 260 km (161.6 mi)
- Winning time: 6h 49' 05"

Results
	Winner	Charly Mottet (FRA)	(Système U–Gitane)
	Second	Gianni Bugno (ITA)	(Chateau d'Ax)
	Third	Marino Lejarreta (ESP)	(Caja Rural–Orbea)

The 1988 Giro di Lombardia was the 82nd edition of the Giro di Lombardia cycle race and was held on 15 October 1988. The race started in Como and finished at the Piazza del Duomo in Milan. The race was won by Charly Mottet of the Système U team.

== General classification ==
Final general classification

Rank	Rider	Team	Time
1	Charly Mottet (FRA)	Système U–Gitane	6h 49' 05"
2	Gianni Bugno (ITA)	Chateau d'Ax	+ 1' 40"
3	Marino Lejarreta (ESP)	Caja Rural–Orbea	+ 1' 45"
4	Luc Roosen (BEL)	Roland	+ 3' 30"
5	Tony Rominger (SUI)	Chateau d'Ax	+ 3' 30"
6	Luca Rota (ITA)	Del Tongo	+ 3' 30"
7	Gianbattista Baronchelli (ITA)	Pepsi-Cola–Fanini–FNT	+ 3' 30"
8	Davide Cassani (ITA)	Gewiss–Bianchi	+ 3' 30"
9	Claudio Chiappucci (ITA)	Carrera Jeans–Vagabond	+ 8' 38"
10	Martial Gayant (FRA)	Toshiba–Look	+ 8' 38"
