= Frank Van Den Abeele =

Belgian cyclist

Personal information
- Born: 3 January 1966 (age 60) Aalst, Belgium

Cycling career
- Sport: Cycling
- Current team: Retired
- Discipline: Road
- Role: Rider

Professional teams
- 1988: ADR–Mini-Flat Enerday
- 1989–1994: Lotto–Vlaanderen–Jong–Mbk–Merckx
- 1995: Refin
- 1996: Cédico–Ville de Charleroi

Frank Van Den Abeele (born 3 January 1966 in Aalst) is a Belgian former professional cyclist. He rode in the 1991 Tour de France and 1995 Giro d'Italia.

== Major results ==
1990
3rd Grand Prix de Cannes
3rd National Road Race Championships
3rd Tour de Berne
1991
1st Stage 4 Vuelta a Galicia
1st Grand Prix de Wallonie
1st Circuit des Frontières
3rd Grand Prix du Midi Libre
3rd Three Days of West Flanders
1992
1st Eschborn–Frankfurt City Loop
2nd Grand Prix de Rennes
10th La Flèche Wallonne
1993
1st Omloop Mandel-Leie-Schelde
3rd Circuit des Frontières
1996
3rd Overall Tour de Bretagne

1st Stage 4

5th Tour de Vendée
