= 1992 Amstel Gold Race =

Dutch cycling race

The 1992 Amstel Gold Race was the 27th edition of the annual Amstel Gold Race road bicycle race, held on Sunday April 25, 1992, in the Dutch province of Limburg. The race stretched 247.5 kilometres, with the start in Heerlen and the finish in Maastricht. There were a total of 168 competitors, with 82 cyclists finishing the race.

== Results ==
	Rider	Team	Time
1	Olaf Ludwig (GER)	Panasonic–Sportlife	6h 27' 30"
2	Johan Museeuw (BEL)	Lotto–Mavic–MBK	s.t.
3	Dimitri Konyshev (RUS)	TVM–Sanyo	s.t.
4	Jean-Claude Colotti (FRA)	Z	s.t.
5	Luc Roosen (BEL)	Tulip Computers	s.t.
6	Vadim Chabalkine (RUS)	Lotus–Festina	s.t.
7	Gilbert Duclos-Lassalle (FRA)	Z	s.t.
8	Guido Bontempi (ITA)	Carrera Jeans–Vagabond	s.t.
9	Jelle Nijdam (NED)	Buckler–Colnago–Decca	s.t.
10	Gert-Jan Theunisse (NED)	TVM–Sanyo	s.t.
