= La Méditerranéenne =

Road cycling stage race

Tour Méditerranéen La Méditerranéenne

Race details
- Date: February
- Region: Spain; France; Italy
- English name: Mediterranean Tour
- Local name(s): Tour Méditerranéen (in French)
- Discipline: Road
- Competition: UCI Europe Tour
- Type: Stage race
- Organiser: Association Olympique Mediterranée
- Race director: André Martres
- Web site: www.letourmed.com

History
- First edition: 1974
- Editions: 42
- Final edition: 2016
- First winner: Charles Rouxel (FRA)
- Most wins: Gerrie Knetemann (NED) (3 wins)
- Final winner: Andriy Hrivko (UKR)

La Méditerranéenne, previously known as Le Tour Méditerranéen, was a professional road bicycle racing event held in Spain, France and Italy, close to the Mediterranean Sea. Run over four days, it holds a 2.1 rating on the UCI Europe Tour.

The event is part of a series of stage races being held in the south of France in February, alongside the Étoile de Bessèges, the Tour du Haut Var and the Tour La Provence. These early-season races are competed mainly by French teams and are considered preparations for Paris–Nice, the first European World Tour event in March.

== History ==
The Tour Méditerranéen ("Tour of the Mediterranean Sea") was created by former Tour de France winner Lucien Aimar in 1974. The event was named Le Trophée Méditerranéen for its first four editions. Run in February, the five-day stage race was won by several eminent riders, including Eddy Merckx, Gianni Bugno, Tony Rominger, Laurent Jalabert and Paolo Bettini. Gerrie Knetemann holds the record with three victories.

In 2012 licensing problems between the organizers and the French Cycling Federation emerged, nearly spelling the cancellation of the event before a deal was ultimately reached. Financial difficulties led to the discontinuation of the race in 2015 after organizers failed to pay debts from the previous edition.

In 2016 the race was revived as La Méditerranéenne and scaled back to four days. The rejuvenated edition was won by Ukrainian Andriy Hrivko.

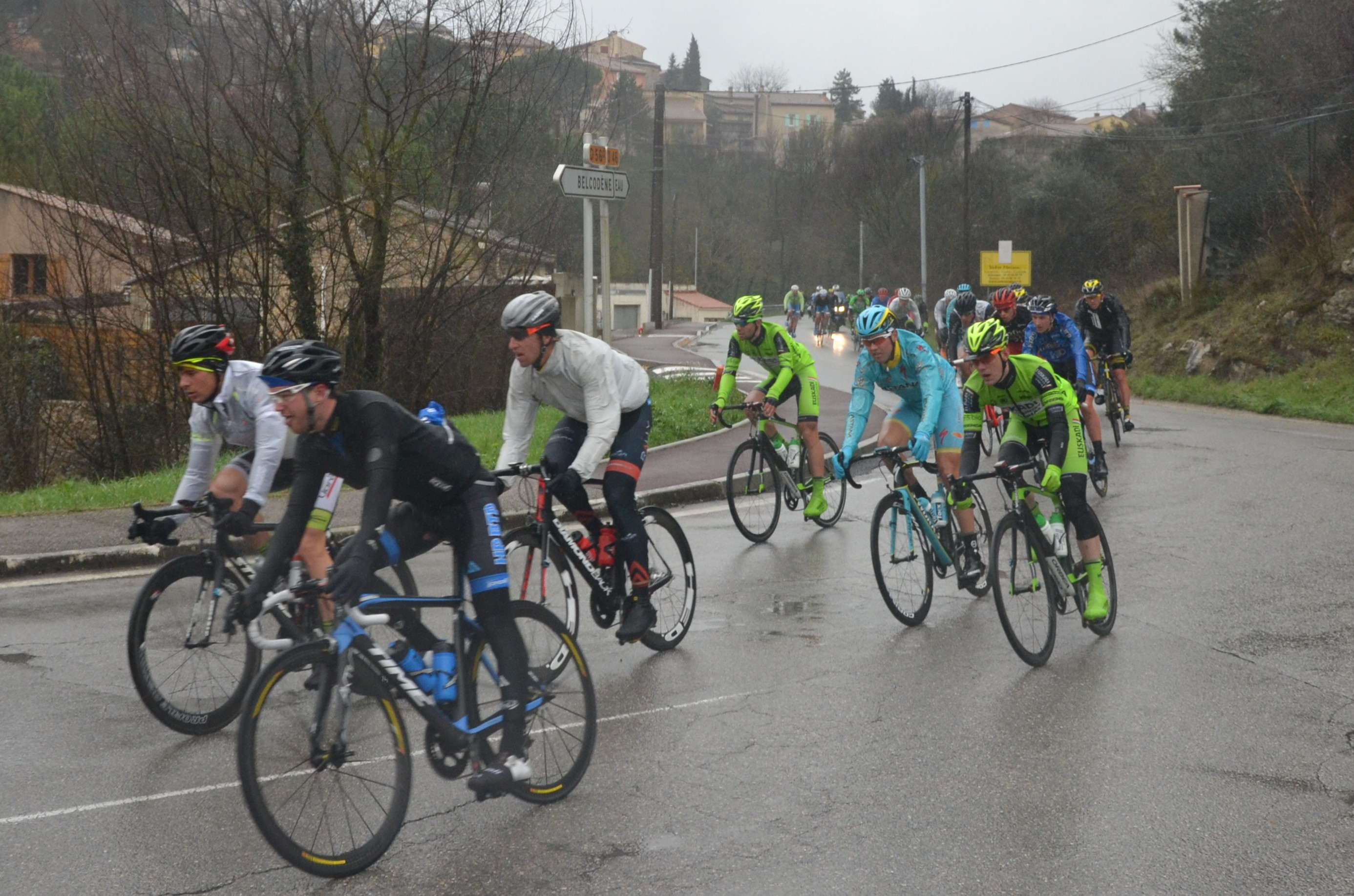
13 february 2016: third stage of La Méditerranéenne

== Route ==
From 1974 until 2014 the race was held in the southern French region of Provence-Alpes-Côte d'Azur, but also occasionally featured stages in Liguria, Italy. Traditionally, a summit finish on the Mont Faron in Toulon was staged every year. As from 2016, the re-invented La Méditerranéenne is contested over four days. The 2016 edition spanned three countries, starting with a team time trial in Banyoles, Spain, before heading into France for two stages close to the Mediterranean coast. The final stage started and finished in Bordighera, on the Italian riviera.

== Winners ==
=== Tour Méditerranéen ===
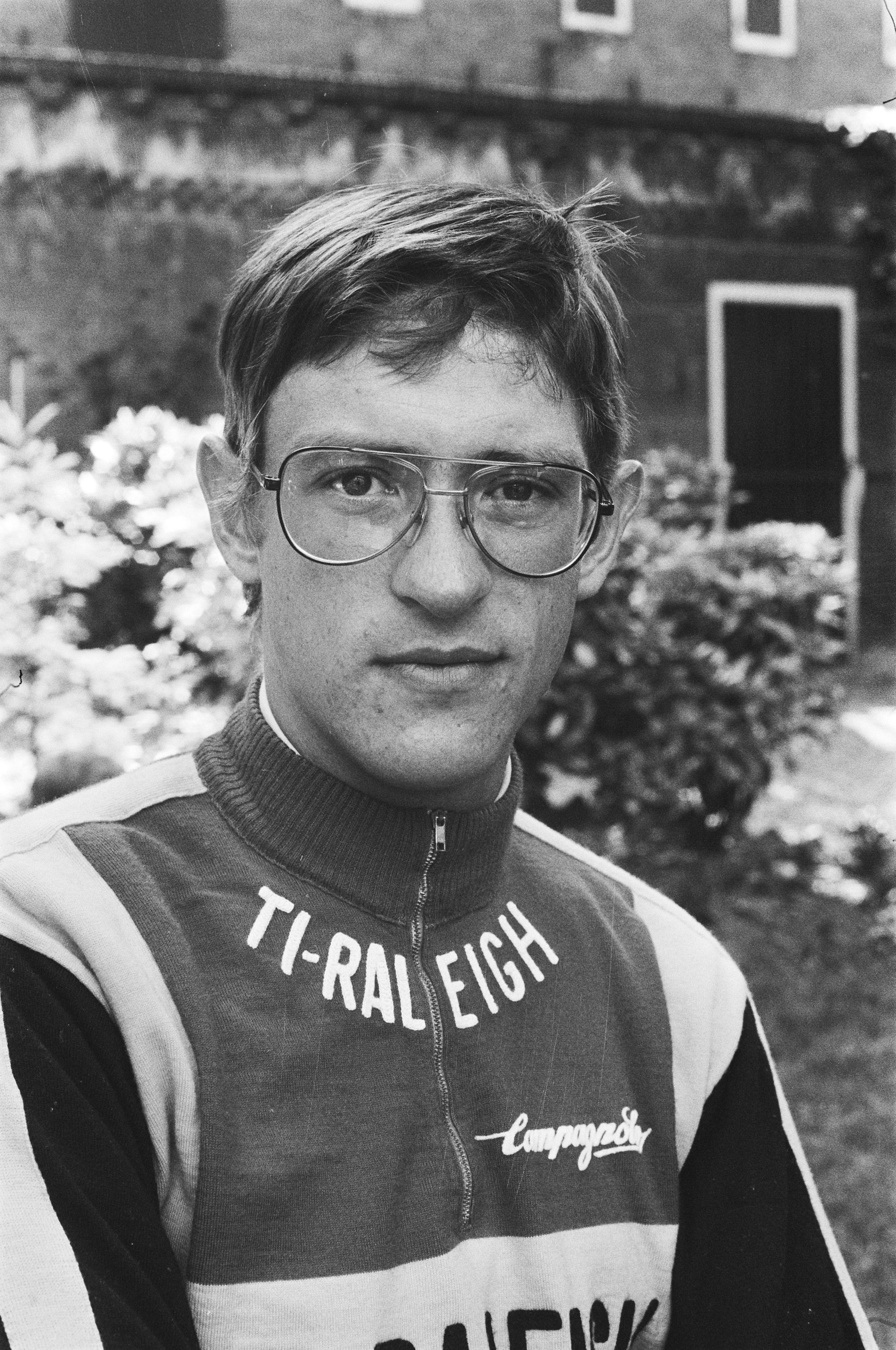
Gerrie Knetemann (pictured in 1977) won the event three times.

Year	Country	Rider	Team
1974	France	Charles Rouxel	Peugeot–BP–Michelin
1975	Belgium	Joseph Bruyère	Molteni
1976	Netherlands	Roy Schuiten	Lejeune–BP
1977	Belgium	Eddy Merckx	Fiat France
1978	Netherlands	Gerrie Knetemann	TI–Raleigh
1979	France	Michel Laurent	Peugeot–Esso–Michelin
1980	Netherlands	Gerrie Knetemann	TI–Raleigh
1981	Switzerland	Stefan Mutter	Cilo–Aufina
1982	France	Michel Laurent	Peugeot–Shell–Michelin
1983	Netherlands	Gerrie Knetemann	TI–Raleigh
1984	France	Jean-Claude Bagot	Skil–Reydel
1985	Australia	Phil Anderson	Panasonic
1986	France	Jean-François Bernard	La Vie Claire
1987	Netherlands	Gerrit Solleveld	Superconfex–Kwantum–Yoko–Colnago
1988	Belgium	Jan Nevens	Sigma-Fina
1989	Switzerland	Tony Rominger	Chateau d'Ax
1990	France	Gérard Rué	Castorama
1991	Australia	Phil Anderson	Motorola
1992	Germany	Rolf Gölz	Ariostea
1993	France	Charly Mottet	Novemail–Histor–Laser Computer
1994	Italy	Davide Cassani	GB–MG Maglificio
1995	Italy	Gianni Bugno	MG Maglificio–Technogym
1996	Belgium	Franck Vandenbroucke	Mapei–GB
1997	France	Emmanuel Magnien	Festina–Lotus
1998	Italy	Rodolfo Massi	Casino–Ag2r
1999	Italy	Davide Rebellin	Polti
2000	France	Laurent Jalabert	ONCE–Deutsche Bank
2001	Italy	Davide Rebellin	Liquigas–Pata
2002	Italy	Michele Bartoli	Fassa Bortolo
2003	Italy	Paolo Bettini	Quick-Step–Davitamon
2004	Germany	Jörg Jaksche	Team CSC
2005	Germany	Jens Voigt	Team CSC
2006	France	Cyril Dessel	AG2R Prévoyance
2007	Spain	Iván Gutiérrez	Caisse d'Epargne
2008	Russia	Alexandre Botcharov	Crédit Agricole
2009	Spain	Luis León Sánchez	Caisse d'Epargne
2010	Italy	Rinaldo Nocentini	Ag2r–La Mondiale
2011	France	David Moncoutié	Cofidis
2012	Great Britain	Jonathan Tiernan-Locke	Endura Racing
2013	Sweden	Thomas Löfkvist	IAM Cycling
2014	Great Britain	Steve Cummings	BMC Racing Team
2015	No race		

=== La Méditerranéenne ===
Year	Country	Rider	Team
2016	Ukraine	Andriy Hrivko	Astana
2017	No race		
