= Luc Roosen =

Belgian cyclist

Personal information
- Born: 17 September 1964 (age 62) Bree, Belgium

Cycling career
- Sport: Cycling
- Current team: Retired
- Discipline: Road
- Role: Rider

Professional teams
- 1986–1987: Kwantum–Decosol–Yoko
- 1988: Roland
- 1989–1990: Histor–Sigma
- 1991–1992: Tulip Computers
- 1993–1994: Lotto
- 1995–1997: Vlaanderen 2002–Eddy Merckx

Major wins
- Stage races Tour de Suisse (1991)

Luc Roosen (born 17 September 1964, in Bree) is a retired road racing cyclist from Belgium, who was a professional rider from 1986 to 1997.

== Career achievements ==
He competed in six Tours de France, as well as one edition each of the Giro d'Italia and Vuelta a España. He also finished in second place in the 1990 Amstel Gold Race. Roosen obtained a total of sixteen victories during his professional career, including the 1991 Tour de Suisse.

=== Major results ===
1986
8th Overall Critérium du Dauphiné Libéré

1st Stage 4b

8th Overall Tour of Belgium
1987
1st Stage 6a Grand Prix du Midi Libre
3rd GP Stad Zottegem
7th Grand Prix de Fourmies
1988
1st Tour du Haut Var
1st Stage 5 Tour de Suisse
2nd Druivenkoers-Overijse
2nd Overall Vuelta a Aragón
3rd Milano–Torino
4th Giro di Lombardia
4th Grand Prix de Wallonie
5th Züri-Metzgete
6th Liège–Bastogne–Liège
1989
2nd Overall Vuelta a Andalucía

1st Stage 4

2nd Overall Tour Méditerranéen

1st Stage 4a

3rd Tour du Haut Var
3rd Giro di Lombardia
4th Rund um den Henninger Turm
9th Overall Paris–Nice
10th La Flèche Wallonne
1990
1st Trophée des Grimpeurs
1st Stage 3 Tour de Suisse
1st Stage 7 Critérium du Dauphiné Libéré
2nd Amstel Gold Race
2nd Trofeo Luis Puig
3rd Overall Tour de Romandie
5th Liège–Bastogne–Liège
6th Overall Vuelta a Andalucía
10th Overall Tirreno–Adriatico
1991
1st Overall Tour de Suisse

1st Stage 2

1st Stage 3a Tour Méditerranéen
3rd Overall Tour du Vaucluse

1st Stage 4

9th Züri-Metzgete
1992
3rd Giro del Friuli
5th Amstel Gold Race
7th La Flèche Wallonne
8th Grand Prix des Amériques
9th Road race, UCI Road World Championships
10th Wincanton Classic
1993
10th Overall Tour Méditerranéen
1994
2nd Overall Vuelta a Andalucía
1995
2nd Overall Niederösterreich Rundfahrt
3rd Gent–Wevelgem
6th Overall West Virginia Classic
9th Trofeo Laigueglia
1996
2nd Overall Tour of Austria

1st Stage 9

1997
4th De Brabantse Pijl
9th Grand Prix de Wallonie

=== Grand Tour general classification results timeline ===
Grand Tour	1986	1987	1988	1989	1990	1991	1992	1993	1994	1995	1996	1997
Giro d'Italia	—	—	—	—	—	—	DNF	—	—	—	—	—
Tour de France	103	104	—	27	—	—	DNF	83	68	—	—	—
Vuelta a España	—	—	—	—	—	37	—	—	—	—	—	—

Legend
—	Did not compete
DNF	Did not finish
