= Davide Cassani =

Italian cyclist and commentator

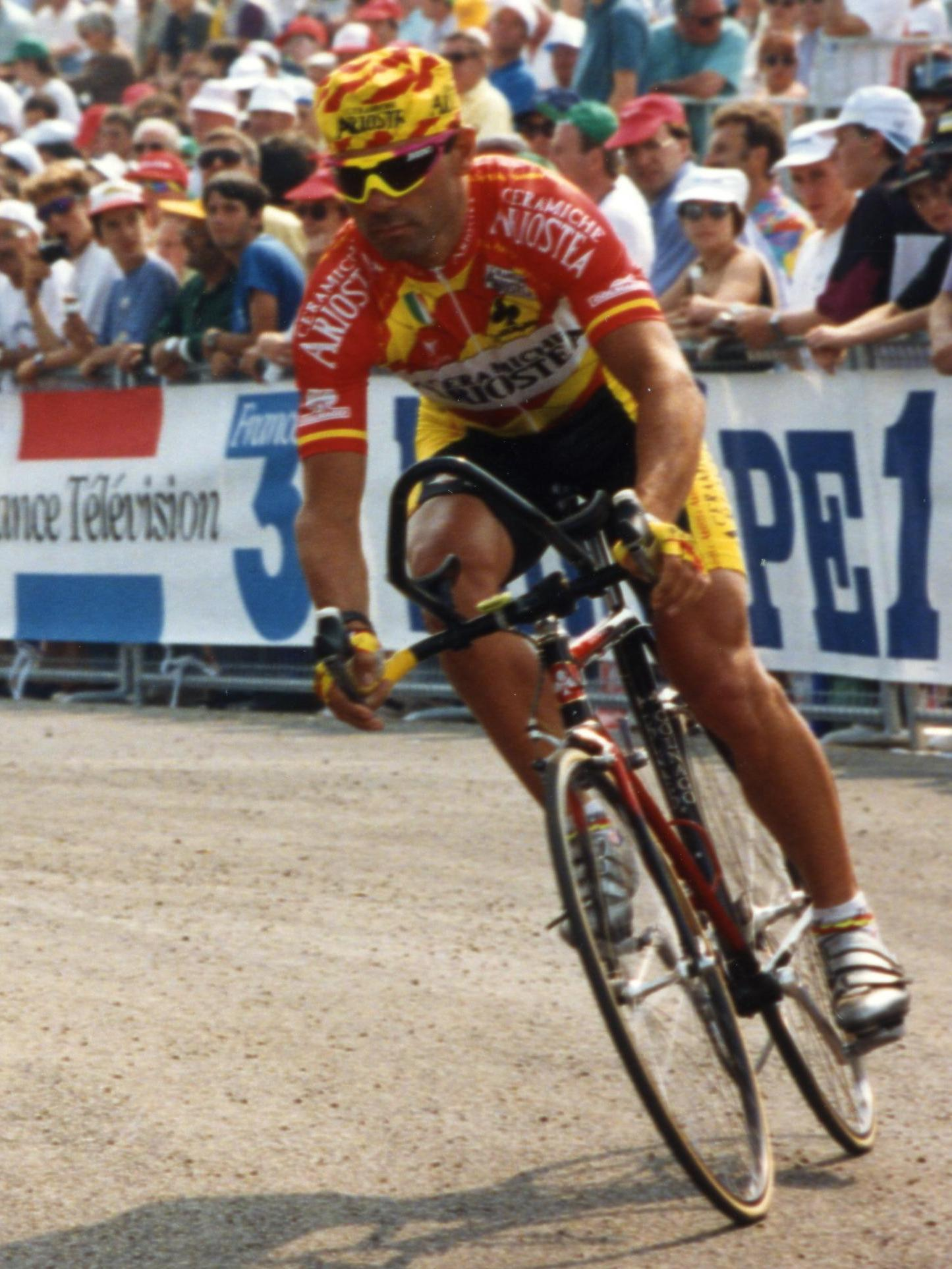
- Cassani at the 1993 Tour de France

Personal information
- Full name: Davide Cassani
- Born: 1 January 1961 (age 65) Faenza, Italy

Cycling career
- Sport: Cycling
- Discipline: Road
- Role: Rider

Professional teams
- 1982–1985: Termolan
- 1986–1987: Carrera
- 1988–1989: Gewiss–Bianchi
- 1990–1993: Ariostea
- 1994–1995: GB-MG Maglifico
- 1996: Saeco-AS Juvenes San Marino

Major wins
- Grand Tours Tour de France 1 TTT stage (1994) Giro d'Italia 2 individual stages (1991, 1993) 1 TTT stage (1987) One-day races and Classics Giro dell'Emilia (1990, 1991, 1995) Milano–Torino (1991)

Davide Cassani (born 1 January 1961) is a former road cyclist and cycling commentator on Italian television from Italy. He was the manager for the Italy national cycling team.

He was born in Faenza. In 1982, he made his professional debut with Termolan–Galli. In 1986, he moved to Carrera, where he supported figures such as Claudio Chiappucci, Roberto Visentini and Stephen Roche; Cassani later raced for Gewiss–Bianchi, Ariostea, GB-MG and Saeco. He retired in 1996 after being hit by a motorist while in training.

== Media work ==
After retiring from cycling, he became a commentator at Italian public broadcaster RAI.

In 2007, he was involved in the withdrawal of Michael Rasmussen from the Tour de France. Cassani claimed to have seen Rasmussen in the Dolomites mountains in Italy, while Rasmussen and Rasmussen's in-laws claimed that he was in Mexico at that time. His comment, coupled with other issues concerning Rasmussen, led to his expulsion from the Rabobank team. The claim was first made a week or so before the controversy exploded — as a routine comment during the Rai Tre afternoon coverage of the Tour. It took the form of a compliment to the athletic dedication of Rasmussen, who has apparently been returning from eight hours of mountain training, so Cassani appears to have had no axe to grind against Rasmussen.

Cassani has also collaborated with Ivan Zazzaroni and Pier Bergonzi to write a biography of Marco Pantani, Pantani. Un eroe tragico (Pantani, a tragic hero).

== Major results ==
1983
2nd Coppa Placci
3rd Giro del Veneto
1984
2nd Overall Tour du Vaucluse
3rd Trofeo Pantalica
5th Gran Premio Città di Camaiore
1985
8th Giro dell'Emilia
1986
3rd Giro del Lazio
7th Giro dell'Emilia
1987
1st Stage 3 Giro d'Italia (TTT)
1988
2nd Giro del Friuli
5th Gran Premio Città di Camaiore
7th Giro dell'Emilia
8th Giro di Lombardia
1989
1st Stage 5 GP Tell
6th Rund um den Henninger Turm
10th Giro dell'Emilia
1990
1st Coppa Bernocchi
1st Giro dell'Emilia
3rd Giro del Lazio
7th Trofeo Laigueglia
9th Gran Premio Città di Camaiore
10th La Flèche Wallonne
10th Milano–Torino
1991
1st Stage 8 Giro d'Italia
1st Coppa Ugo Agostoni
1st Giro dell'Emilia
1st Milano–Torino
1st Trofeo dello Scalatore
3rd Giro del Lazio
1992
1st Giro di Campania
1st Giro della Provincia di Reggio Calabria
1st Gran Premio Città di Camaiore
2nd Giro dell'Emilia
2nd Grand Prix des Amériques
3rd La Flèche Wallonne
3rd Giro del Veneto
3rd Coppa Placci
3rd Giro di Romagna
3rd Giro di Lombardia
4th Liège–Bastogne–Liège
5th Overall Tirreno–Adriatico

1st Stage 3

6th Milano–Torino
1993
1st Stage 15 Giro d'Italia
1st Coppa Ugo Agostoni
3rd Road race, National Road Championships
3rd GP Industria & Commercio di Prato
5th Tre Valli Varesine
6th Overall Tour of the Basque Country
7th Amstel Gold Race
9th Milan–San Remo
1994
1st Overall Tour Méditerranéen

1st Stages 4 & 7 (ITT)

1st Stage 3 Tour de France (TTT)
1st Stage 4 Tour of the Basque Country
3rd Trofeo Matteotti
3rd Giro dell'Emilia
5th Trofeo Laigueglia
6th Giro di Lombardia
8th La Flèche Wallonne
1995
1st Giro dell'Emilia
1st Giro di Romagna
1st Coppa Sabatini
2nd Amstel Gold Race
2nd Coppa Placci
3rd Gran Piemonte
5th Tre Valli Varesine
9th Milano–Torino
