= Scott Sunderland (road cyclist) =

Australian cyclist

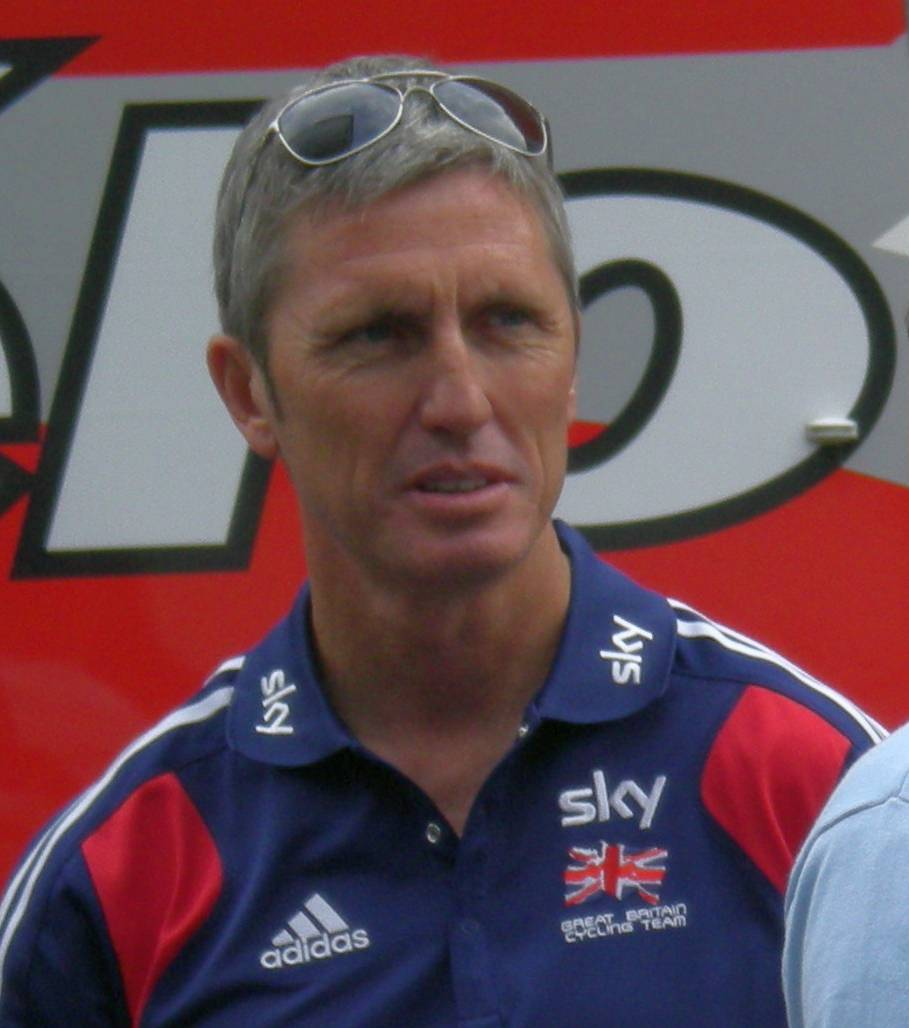
- Scott Sunderland

Personal information
- Born: 28 November 1966 (age 59) Inverell, New South Wales, Australia

Cycling career
- Sport: Cycling

Professional teams
- 1990–1994: TVM
- 1995–1996: Lotto–Isoglass
- 1997: GAN
- 1998–2000: Palmans–Ideal
- 2001–2003: Team Fakta
- 2004: Alessio–Bianchi

Scott G. Sunderland (born 28 November 1966) is an Australian former professional cyclist, who is a now a sports manager and consultant.

Sunderland was born in Inverell, a country town in northern New South Wales. He worked double shifts in the Inverell abattoirs to fund his early European racing career.

Until he retired at the end of 2004, Sunderland was Australia's longest serving professional cyclist, and placed highly in many of the cycling world's greatest events.

As a racer, Sunderland had some injuries and setbacks, the most memorable being when he was struck by a car driven by his former director, Cees Priem, during the 1998 Amstel Gold race.

Sunderland recovered and the final few years of his career saw a resurgent Scott Sunderland.

Sunderland rode his last Tour de France in 2004.

== Management career ==
After his retirement Scott Sunderland became Sports Director with Bjarne Riis' CSC squad from 2004 till end of 2008. He coached the team to consecutive wins in the Paris–Roubaix in 2006 and 2007. In 2008 CSC squad took the overall victory in the Tour de France with Spanish star rider Carlos Sastre.

In September 2008, Sunderland was recruited by the Cervélo TestTeam owner Gerard Vroomen to form his newly announced Professional Cycling Team. 2008 Tour de France winner Carlos Sastre followed Sunderland in his move.

Early 2009 Sunderland was headhunted by British Cycling and BC High Performance Manager Dave Brailsford and appointed Sports Manager to help put together a new professional British road cycling team, financially backed by BSkyB.

In 2010, Team Sky entered its first year of competition with Scott Sunderland in the position of Senior Sports Director.

In February 2010 the team got its first semi-classic victory when Juan Antonio Flecha won the Belgian semi-classic Omloop Het Nieuwsblad with a solo break. Sunderland left Team Sky in May 2010, citing that he wanted to spend more time with his family.

Sunderland took up a role as a Race Director for the National Road Series, Australia's premier domestic road cycling competition, in 2013

In 2019 Sunderland took on the role of general race director of the Flanders Classics in Belgium.

== Major results ==
Juniors Under 16
NSW State Champion (Road Race)
2nd Teams Pursuit (Track) Australian National Championships
2nd Teams Time-trial (Road) Australian National Championships
Juniors Under 18
NSW State Champion (Individual National Road Race)
Australian National Champion 50 km Teams Time-trial (Road)
Australian National Champion Teams Pursuit (Track)
Oceania Games
1st Individual Road Race, 1st Time Trial, 2nd teams pursuit (Track), 3rd 30 km point score (Track)
1985 Amateur
NSW State Champion, 50 km point score (Track)
2nd 4000m teams pursuit (Track) Australian National Championships
1986 Amateur
1st Australian Individual Senior National Road Championships (Aged 19 - racing elite)
1990
Out due to a knee injury in the early part of the season
14th Paris–Camembert
Finished Tour of Switzerland and Giro d'Italia
1991
1st Trofeo Pantalica
9th Overall Tirreno–Adriatico

3rd in stage 4

4th Overall Herald Sun Tour
7th Overall Kellogg's Tour of Great Britain
1992
1st Overall Mazda Alpine Tour

1st Mountain jersey,

5th Milan–San Remo

4th Overall Settimana Ciclista Internazionale
3rd stage 12 Vuelta a España
1993

Winner Oppy Oscar Cyclist of the Year, Australia

3rd Zottegem
4th Stage 3 Vuelta a España
5th Stage 2 Vuelta a España
10th Overall Tour of Switzerland,
13th Milan–San Remo
1994
1st Schynberg Rundfahrt Sulz
2nd Trophee Des Grimpeurs
4th stage 1 Vuelta de Pays Basque
10th Overall Kelloggs Tour of Great Britain,

1st Mountains jersey

10th Overall Vuelta a Burgos
15th Clásica de San Sebastián
17th World Championships Sicily
1995

Knee operation in April; back in competition in July

10th Giro Del Emilia
11th Coppa Sabatini
13th Coppa Placci
1996
1st Stage 4 Tour Des Regions Wallonne
16th Overall Tour of Luxemburg

3rd in 1 stage

1997
1st Sprint classification Tour De Romandie
7th Overall Tour Du Mediterrian
10th Milan-Turin
14th Paris - Bourges
15th Tour of Lombardie
19th Overall Paris–Nice

5th in stage over Mt Ventoux

19th Overall Vuelta Du Pays Basque

2nd in stage 3

1998
1st GP Nokere
3rd G.P. Pino Cerami
6th Kemzeke
9th G.P. Cholet
11th Tour of Flanders
11th Gent–Wevelgem

Out of competition from May 1998 until 18 July 1999 due to accident during Amstel Gold World Cup Race

1999

A crash kept him out of competition until July 1999

1st Stage 1 Vuelta a Castilla-Leon
4th Overall Commonwealth Bank Classic,

1st King of the Mountains Classification
1st Points Classification

2000
1st Noosa Criterium
2nd stage 4 Vuelta a Burgos
3rd stage 2 Vuelta a Burgos,
2nd Australian National Road Race Championships
3rd Overijse
4th Zottegem
7th World Road Race Championships
2001
1st Grand Prix Pino Cerami
1st Grand Prix Fourmies
1st Stage 5 Herald Sun Tour
2nd Brabantse Pijl
2nd Grand Prix Rennes
3rd Paris–Camembert
3rd Grand Prix Wallonie
3rd Overall Paris–Corrèze
3rd Paris–Bourges
5th Overall Hessen Rundfahrt

1st in Mountains Classification

13th Overall Tour of Germany
18th Amstel Gold Race
2002
1st Stage 7 Bank Austria Tour
2003
2nd CSC Classic
23rd Overall Giro d'Italia
2004
44th Paris–Roubaix
96th Overall Tour de France
