= Ariostea =

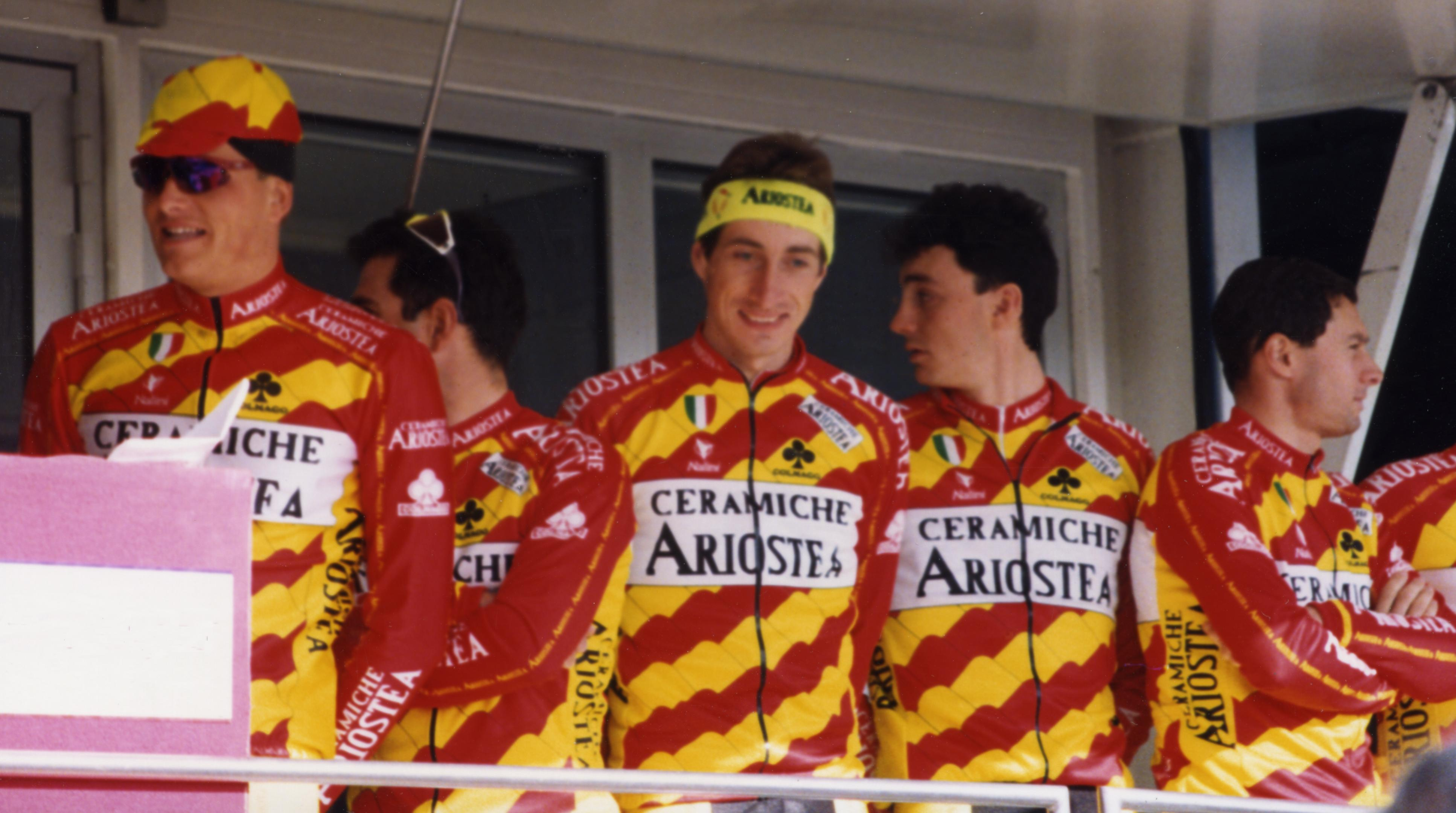
- The team at the 1993 Paris–Nice

Team information
- UCI code: ARI
- Registered: Italy
- Founded: 1984
- Disbanded: 1993
- Discipline: Road

Team name history
- 1984 1985 1986–1988 1989–1993: Ariostea; Ariostea–Oece; Ariostea–Gres; Ariostea

Ariostea (UCI team code: ARI) was an Italian professional cycling team from 1984 to 1993. Its first team manager was Giorgio Vannucci; he was replaced in 1986 by Giancarlo Ferretti, who remained manager until the team was disbanded in 1993.

== History ==
The first major victories were the two stage wins at the 1986 Giro d'Italia by Sergio Santimaria (1st stage, maglia rosa for one day) and Norwegian rider Dag Erik Pedersen (15th stage). The highest placed Ariostea rider in the general classification was Alfio Vandi, who finished 11th, 12 minutes and 40 seconds behind the winner.

In the late 1980s, the team became a more prominent presence in the peloton. One of its successful riders was Rolf Sørensen who won Paris–Tours in 1990 and the Tirreno–Adriatico of 1992. Moreno Argentin won the team its first "monument", the 1990 Tour of Flanders, followed by a victory at the La Flèche Wallonne. 1990 also saw the team's first Tour de France stage win (Argentin) and two more Girostages (Adriano Baffi).

In 1991, Argentin scored another double in Belgium, with wins in La Flèche Wallonne and Liège–Bastogne–Liège. Davide Cassani won three major classics in Italy (Milano–Torino, Giro dell'Emilia and Coppa Agostoni), while Massimiliano Lelli won two Giro stages - finishing third overall. More success followed at the Tour de France as stage wins for Bruno Cenghialta, Argentin and Marco Lietti registered a Tour triple triumph on consecutive days. That followed a team time trial win on Stage 2 into Chassieu that put Rolf Sørensen in the yellow jersey as leader of the general classification for four days.

Ariostea dominated the 1992 Tirreno–Adriatico with five stage wins and the general classification (Sørensen). Giorgio Furlan won the Tour de Suisse, Rolf Gölz the Tour Méditerranéen. There was another stage win in the Giro, this time for Marco Saligari. Roberto Conti finished 9th in the general classification.

In 1993, its final year, Ariostea was victorious in the Amstel Gold Race (Rolf Järmann). Bjarne Riis won a Giro stage and placed 5th in the general classification in the Tour de France. Saligari also won a stage in the Giro, and was the winner that year's Tour de Suisse. By far the most successful rider of the team this year was Pascal Richard of Switzerland. He won the Giro del Lazio, Giro di Lombardia, the Tour de Romandie and a handful of stages and one day races throughout the year. In the team's final race, the 1993 Giro di Lombardia, Ariostea riders Pascal Richard and Giorgio Furlan finished first and second, breaking away for the final 6 miles of the race.

Team manager Ferretti and a number of riders went to GB–MG Maglificio the next year.

== Major results ==
1985
Overall Giro di Puglia, Silvano Contini
Overall GP du Midi-Libre, Silvano Contini

Stage 1, Silvano Contini

Coppa Placci, Silvano Contini

1986
Stage 1 Giro d'Italia, Sergio Santimaria
Stage 15 Giro d'Italia, Dag Erik Pedersen

1987
Stage 8 Tour de Suisse, Alessandro Paganessi

1988
Stage 6 Settimana Siciliana, Rolf Sørensen
Stage 3 Giro d'Italia, Stephan Joho
Stages 1 & 9 Tour de Suisse, Stephan Joho
Stage 7 Tour de Suisse, Francesco Cesarini
Stage 1b Zürich, Stephan Joho
Stage 4 Tour of Denmark, Rolf Sørensen
Overall Schwanenbrau Cup, Bruno Cenghialta

Stage 2, Rolf Sørensen

1989
Giro di Campania, Luciano Rabottini
Stage 7a Paris–Nice, Adriano Baffi
Stages 2 & 3 Driedaagse van De Panne, Adriano Baffi
GP Pino Cerami, Stephan Joho
Stage 6 Giro d'Italia, Stephan Joho
Winterthur Criterium, Stephan Joho
Coppa Bernocchi, Rolf Sørensen
Omloop van de Vlasstreek, Rolf Sørensen
Six Days of Zürich, Adriano Baffi

1990
Overall Settimana Siciliana, Rolf Sørensen

Stage 1, Rolf Sørensen
Stage 5, Adriano Baffi

Trofeo Laigueglia, Rolf Sørensen
Stage 5 Paris–Nice, Adriano Baffi
Giro dei Sei Comuni, Stephan Joho
Tour of Flanders, Moreno Argentin
La Flèche Wallonne, Moreno Argentin
Stage 2 Giro del Trentino, Adriano Baffi
Stages 11 & 18 Giro d'Italia, Adriano Baffi
Stage 9 Tour de Suisse, Moreno Argentin
Stage 3 Tour de France, Moreno Argentin
Stage 2 Tour of Belgium, Adriano Baffi
Stage 5b Tour of Belgium, Stephan Joho
Coppa Bernocchi, Davide Cassani
Stage 6 Volta a Catalunya, Marco Lietti
Overall Schwanenbrau Cup, Stephan Joho

Stage 3, Stephan Joho

Giro dell'Emilia, Davide Cassani
Coppa Sabatini, Moreno Argentin
Paris–Tours, Rolf Sørensen

1991
La Flèche Wallonne, Moreno Argentin
Liège–Bastogne–Liège, Moreno Argentin
Young rider classification Giro d'Italia, Massimiliano Lelli

Stage 8, Davide Cassani
Stages 12 & 16, Massimiliano Lelli

Stage 9 Tour de Suisse, Rolf Sørensen
Stage 2 (TTT) Tour de France
Stage 14 Tour de France, Bruno Cenghialta
Stage 15 Tour de France, Moreno Argentin
Stage 16 Tour de France, Marco Lietti
Coppa Bernocchi, Giorgio Furlan
Coppa Agostoni, Davide Cassani
Giro dell'Emilia, Davide Cassani
Milano–Torino, Davide Cassani

1992
Overall Tour Méditerranéen, Rolf Gölz

Stages 1 & 5, Rolf Gölz

Giro di Campania, Davide Cassani
Stage 8 Paris–Nice, Adriano Baffi
Stage 2 Critérium International, Giorgio Furlan
La Flèche Wallonne, Giorgio Furlan
Overall Giro di Calabria, Marco Saligari
Overall Hofbrau Cup, Alberto Elli

Stage 2, Alberto Elli
Stage 3a, Rolf Sørensen

Stage 13 Giro d'Italia, Giorgio Furlan
Stage 15 Giro d'Italia, Marco Saligari
Stage 4 Tour de Luxembourg, Alberto Elli
Overall Tour de Suisse, Giorgio Furlan

Stage 2, Giorgio Furlan

Stage 12 Tour de France, Rolf Järmann
Paris–Brussel, Rolf Sørensen
Linz Criterium, Adriano Baffi

1993
Stage 1 Critérium International, Pascal Richard
Stage 9 Settimana Ciclistica Lombarda, Fabio Casartelli
Amstel Gold Race, Rolf Järmann
GP Industria & Artigianato, Marco Saligari
Overall Tour de Romandie, Pascal Richard

Stage 3, Pascal Richard

Stage 7 Giro d'Italia, Bjarne Riis
Stage 9 Giro d'Italia, Giorgio Furlan
Stage 15 Giro d'Italia, Davide Cassani
Stage 17 Giro d'Italia, Marco Saligari
Overall Tour de Suisse, Marco Saligari

Stage 2, Giorgio Furlan
Stage 7, Rolf Järmann
Stage 8, Pascal Richard

Stage 7 Tour de France, Bjarne Riis
Coppa Agostoni, Davide Cassani
Giro di Lombardia, Pascal Richard
