= Vladislav Bobrik =

Russian cyclist

Personal information
- Full name: Vladislav Bobrik
- Born: 6 January 1971 (age 55) Novosibirsk, Russia
- Height: 1.75 m (5 ft 9 in)
- Weight: 62 kg (137 lb; 9 st 11 lb)

Cycling career
- Sport: Cycling
- Discipline: Road
- Role: Rider

Professional teams
- 1993–1996: Mecair–Ballan
- 1997: Ros Mary–Minotti Italia–Ideal
- 1998–1999: Riso Scotti–MG Maglificio

Major wins
- One-day races and Classics Giro di Lombardia (1994)

Vladislav Bobrik (born 6 January 1971) is a Russian former road bicycle racer. He only had six victories in his career with the most prestigious being the 1994 Giro di Lombardia.

== Career ==
Going into the 1994 Giro di Lombardia, Bobrik was not seen as a contender but as a domestique for Bjarne Riis. So when Bobrik made it into the final breakaway, no one thought twice. As the group thinned out he kept with the leaders before out sprinting Claudio Chiappucci and Pascal Richard. The bike he raced on was one of the first Titanium bikes made by De Rosa.

Bobrik started the 1996 Vuelta a España as the leader of Gewiss Playbus. He was unable to follow the leaders up the mountains and lost time in the first week. With two 11th placings in the final few stages he finished in 16th overall his best performance in a Grand Tour.

== Major results ==
1988
3rd Overall Vuelta a Navarra
1989
1st Overall Dusika Jugend Tour
1990
1st Stage 3, Tour de Trump
1991
3rd Overall Redlands Classic

1st Stage 3

4th Overall Giro della Valle d'Aosta
10th Overall Tour de Trump
1992
3rd Piccolo Giro di Lombardia
3rd Overall Tour de Bretagne
4th Overall Région Pays de la Loire Tour
1993
5th Firenze–Pistoia
7th Coppa Sabatini
10th Overall Settimana Ciclistica Lombarda

1st Stage 2

1994
1st Giro di Lombardia
2nd Tre Valli Varesine
4th Coppa Sabatini
7th Giro dell'Appennino
9th Subida a Urkiola
9th Milano-Torino
9th Overall Vuelta a Aragón

1st Stage 1

10th Overall Tour of the Basque Country
1995
1st Josef Voegeli Memorial
2nd Overall Paris–Nice

1st Stage 8b

2nd Overall Critérium International
4th Overall Setmana Catalana de Ciclisme
5th Gran Premio Industria e Commercio di Prato
6th Giro di Toscana
10th Grand Prix Eddy Merckx
10th Milano-Torino
1996
9th Subida a Urkiola
1997
1st Memorial Gastone Nencini
2nd Overall Trofeo dello Scalatore
5th Overall Volta a Portugal
1998
10th Overall Tour de Pologne

=== Grand Tour general classification results timeline ===
Grand Tour	1993	1994	1995	1996	1997	1998
Giro d'Italia	61	—	28	—	DNF	23
Tour de France	—	62	—	—	—	DNF
Vuelta a España	—	—	DNF	16	—	—

Legend
—	Did not compete
DNF	Did not finish
