= Gianni Bugno =

Italian cyclist (born 1964)

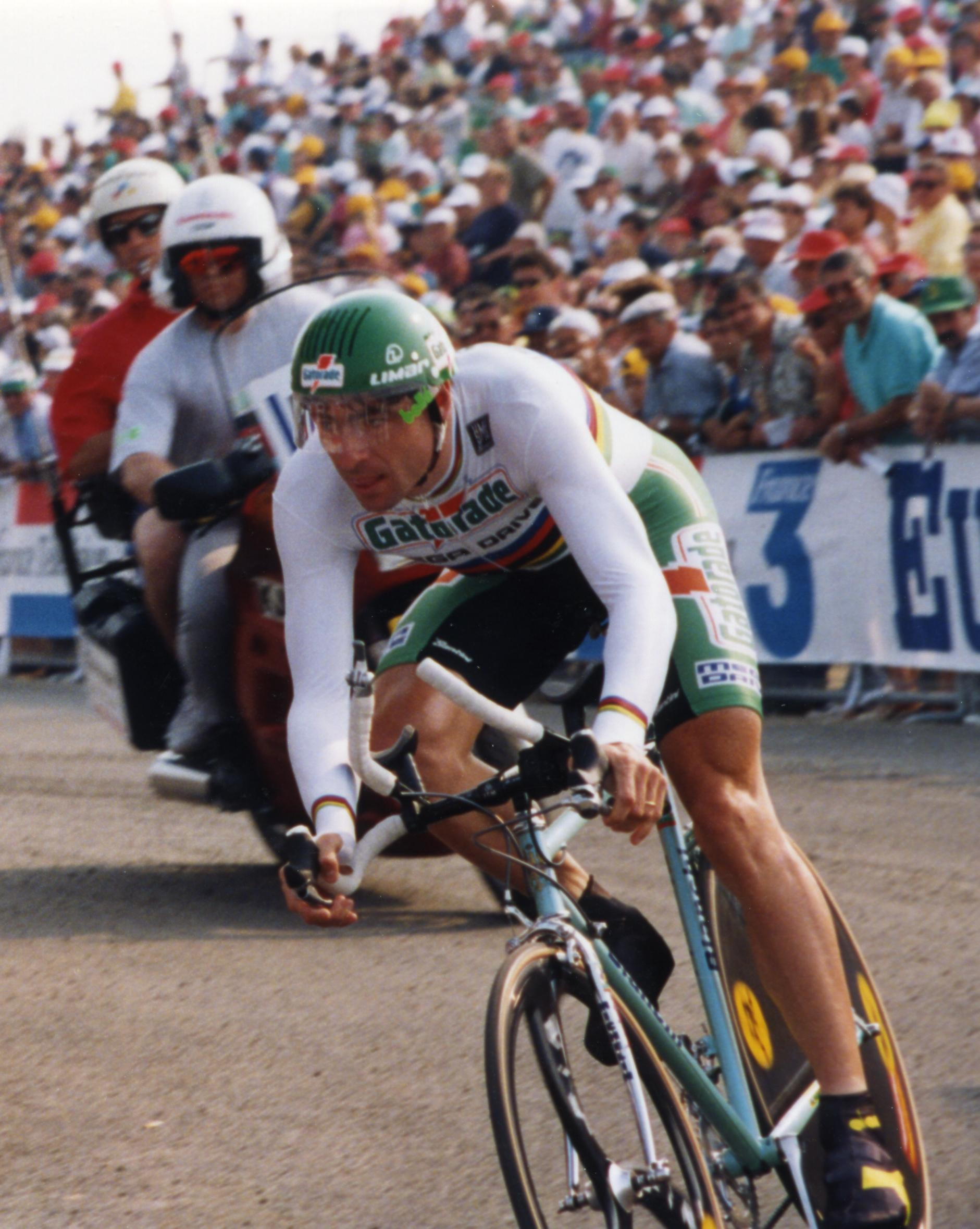
- Bugno at the 1993 Tour de France

Personal information
- Full name: Gianni Bugno
- Born: 14 February 1964 (age 62) Brugg, Switzerland
- Height: 1.77 m (5 ft 10 in)
- Weight: 68 kg (150 lb)

Cycling career
- Sport: Cycling
- Current team: Retired
- Discipline: Road
- Role: Rider
- Rider type: All-rounder

Professional teams
- 1985–1987: Atala
- 1988–1993: Chateau d'Ax
- 1994: Team Polti–Vaporetto
- 1995–1996: MG Maglificio–Technogym
- 1997–1998: Mapei–GB

Major wins
- Grand Tours Tour de France 4 individual stages (1988, 1990, 1991) Giro d'Italia General classification (1990) Points classification (1990) 9 individual stages (1989, 1990, 1991, 1994, 1996) Vuelta a España 2 individual stages (1996, 1998) Stage races Giro del Trentino (1990) One-Day Races and Classics World Road Race Championships (1991, 1992) National Road Race Championships (1991, 1995) Milan–San Remo (1990) Tour of Flanders (1994) Clásica de San Sebastián (1991) Milano-Torino (1992) Wincanton Classic (1990) Other UCI Road World Cup (1990)
Medal record
Representing Italy
Men's road bicycle racing
World Championships
Gold medal – first place	1991 Stuttgart	Elite Men's Road Race
Gold medal – first place	1992 Benidorm	Elite Men's Road Race
Bronze medal – third place	1990 Utsunomiya	Elite Men's Road Race

Gianni Bugno (Italian: [ˈdʒanni ˈbuɲɲo]; born 14 February 1964) is a retired Italian professional road racing cyclist.

Bugno was a versatile rider, able to do well in different types of races. He won numerous stages in the Tour de France, and the Milan–San Remo classic in 1990. In 1991, he won the Clásica de San Sebastián, and in 1994, he won the Tour of Flanders.

Bugno's greatest success was the double victory in the World Championship. In 1991 he beat Steven Rooks of the Netherlands and Miguel Indurain of Spain, and in 1992 finished ahead of Laurent Jalabert of France and Dmitri Konyshev of Russia.

Bugno's performance in the Grand Tours, however, was overshadowed by Miguel Indurain. Bugno's victory in the Giro d'Italia in 1990 is considered one of the most dominant performances in that race — he led from start to finish. While he won the Giro in 1990, he finished second to Indurain in the Tour de France in 1991 and third behind Indurain and Claudio Chiappucci in 1992. In a battle in the 1992 Tour, Indurain kept his calm despite Chiappucci's attack in the Alps; Bugno had to chase and cracked in the final parts of the stage. Indurain was quoted as saying that Bugno was his biggest threat in the Tour.

== Biography ==
Based in Monza but born in Switzerland, Bugno was considered introverted, pensive and softly-spoken. He entered the professional cycling in September 1985 with Atala. In March 1986, he won his first professional race at the Giro del Friuli. He made his debut at the 1986 Giro d'Italia and finished in 41st overall. In June, he won the Giro dell'Appennino, out-sprinting Francesco Moser. On 16 October 1986, he won the Giro del Piemonte in Novara.

Bugno gained his first major victory riding for the Swiss team Chateau d'Ax on a flat stage of the 1988 Tour de France, having escaped in a breakaway alongside a more experienced Belgian Jan Nevens towards the stage end into Limoges, he surprised Nevens with an electric sprint.

Bugno won the 1990 Milan–San Remo with a record average speed of 45.8kph, breaking the speed record set by Eddy Merckx in 1967. Having gone clear with Angelo Canzonieri after passing Imperia, before riding clear on the Cipressa, maintaining a lead of 15 seconds on the chasers over the Poggio, holding off Rolf Gölz to become the first Italian winner since Francesco Moser six years prior.

Bugno secured a dominant victory in the 1990 Giro d'Italia having led from the start by claiming the maglia rosa on day one, having won the opening 13 km time trial in Bari by three seconds from specialist Thierry Marie. He won a mountainous stage on the seventh day, and the final time trial in handsome fashion to win by 6:33 from Charly Mottet. The winning margin was the greatest at the Giro since Merckx led Felice Gimondi by over seven minutes in 1973. His consistency also saw Bugno claim the points classification ahead of Phil Anderson, with his performance earning enough points for Bugno to top the UCI Road World Rankings for the first time.

Bugno placed 7th overall at the 1990 Tour de France, winning two stages, including the stage to Alpe d'Huez, where he became the first Italian winner since Fausto Coppi in 1952, and the flattest stage of the Tour into Bordeaux. Later that month, he regained the lead in the season-long UCI World Cup with a win by fifteen seconds over Sean Kelly at the 1990 Wincanton Classic in England. He did not surrender the lead again, with the title secured by the World Cup final in October. Bugno also had a third-place finish at the 1990 World Championships in Tokyo, finishing behind Rudy Dhaenens and Dirk de Wolf of Belgium by eight seconds, ahead of Greg Lemond and Sean Kelly.

A pre-race favourite with fellow Italian Claudio Chiappucci for the 1991 Giro d'Italia, he placed fourth overall having been embroiled in a tactical battle with his compatriot that was considered detrimental to both their efforts and saw another Italian, Franco Chioccioli win his first grand tour, with Bugno winning stages into Sassari and Brescia, and in the individual time trial on stage 10, but not having the consistency he displayed the previous year. Having become the 1991 Italian champion, he finished second to Spaniard Miguel Indurain in the 1991 Tour de France, adrift by 3:36 overall. He did win stage 17 ahead of Indurain for back-to-back victories atop Alpe d'Huez.

Bugno placed second to Pedro Delgado at the Tour of Burgos and won the 1991 Clásica de San Sebastián in August ahead of Delgado with a solo attack, regaining top spot in the UCI Road World Rankings from Chiappucci. Later that month at the 1991 World Championship he beat Steven Rooks of the Netherlands and Indurain in Stuttgart to became World Champion for the first time.

Bugno skipped the 1992 Giro to have a clear run at the Tour de France with a team bolstered by the arrival of Laurent Fignon, but the expected tilt at the title failed to happen. He did still place third overall behind Indurain and Chiappucci at the 1992 Tour de France, but having only moved on to the podium ahead of Alpe d'Huez winner Andy Hampsten and long-time yellow jersey holder Pascal Lino, with his performance in the final time trial. Bugno retained his word title at the 1992 World Championships in Benidorm, as he finished ahead of Laurent Jalabert of France and Dmitri Konyshev of Russia.

In 1994 Bugno won the 1994 Tour of Flanders ahead of defending champion Johan Museeuw from a small group including Andrei Tchmil and Franco Ballerini, but an early celebration nearly cost him the win, with his final advantage of 7 mm the smallest ever margin in the race's history. It was considered a surprise win with Bugno not known as a cobbled Classics rider, finishing 43rd at Flanders the previous year.

Bugno placed second at the 1995 Liège–Bastogne–Liège behind a solo Mauro Gianetti leading a chase group over the line ahead of Michele Bartoli and Laurent Jalabert. In June 1995 he became the Italian champion once again.

=== Post-racing career ===
Bugno retired following the 1998 road season and is now a helicopter rescue pilot. He piloted a camera helicopter for the Tour of Lombardy, on 20 October 2007, and for the whole of the 2008 Giro d'Italia. He ran for a seat in Lombard Regional Council in the Lombard regional election, 2010 for the centre-left coalition of political parties, but he was not elected.

He has remained involved with the Giro d'Italia by being one of the TV helicopter pilots for the Italian national broadcaster, RAI.

He is the former president of CPA (Association of Professional Cyclists). In November 2012, in the wake of the Lance Armstrong doping scandal, he demanded that an independent anti-doping body be established. He stated that the UCI could not be trusted to enforce the rules. His son Alessio Bugno was a professional footballer.

== Major results ==
1982
4th Road race, UCI Junior Road World Championships
1985
1st Gran Premio della Liberazione
3rd Overall Giro Ciclistico d'Italia
3rd Circuito Belvedere
1986
1st Giro dell'Appennino
1st Giro del Friuli
1st Giro del Piemonte
2nd Giro del Lazio
3rd Gran Premio Città di Camaiore
4th Coppa Agostoni
4th Giro del Veneto
5th Overall Giro di Puglia
5th Coppa Placci
6th Paris–Brussels
8th Giro dell'Emilia
9th Milano–Vignola
9th Giro dell'Umbria
10th Trofeo Matteotti
10th Firenze–Pistoia
1987
1st Giro dell'Appennino
1st Coppa Sabatini
1st Gran Premio Città di Camaiore
1st Stage 3 Giro del Trentino
3rd GP Industria & Artigianato di Larciano
3rd Coppa Placci
3rd Firenze–Pistoia
4th Overall Giro di Puglia
4th Milano–Torino
4th Giro dell'Emilia
4th Giro del Veneto
4th Giro del Lazio
4th Giro della Provincia di Reggio Calabria
4th Giro di Campania
6th Milano–Vignola
1988
1st Giro dell'Appennino
1st Coppa Agostoni
1st Stage 18 Tour de France
1st Stage 2 Tour de Romandie
2nd Giro di Lombardia
2nd Gent–Wevelgem
2nd Giro del Piemonte
2nd Giro della Provincia di Reggio Calabria
3rd Coppa Bernocchi
3rd Giro del Veneto
4th Giro della Romagna
5th Firenze–Pistoia
6th Overall Critérium International
9th Giro del Lazio
10th Overall Giro del Trentino
1989
1st Tre Valli Varesine
1st Stage 21 Giro d'Italia
2nd Road race, National Road Championships
3rd Trofeo Baracchi (with Sean Kelly)
4th Firenze–Pistoia
5th Baden-Baden (with Tony Rominger)
7th Overall Tour de Romandie
7th Grand Prix Eddy Merckx
8th Road race, UCI Road World Championships
1990
1st UCI Road World Cup
1st Overall Giro d'Italia

1st Points classification
1st Stages 1 (ITT), 7 & 19 (ITT)

1st Overall Giro del Trentino

1st Stage 3

1st Milan–San Remo
1st Wincanton Classic
1st Stage 1 Euskal Bizikleta
3rd Road race, UCI Road World Championships
4th Tour de Berne
5th Züri-Metzgete
5th Coppa Placci
7th Overall Tour de France

1st Stages 11 & 18

7th Liège–Bastogne–Liège
8th Amstel Gold Race
8th Grand Prix de Lunel
10th Firenze–Pistoia
1991
1st Road race, UCI Road World Championships
1st Road race, National Road Championships
1st Overall Euskal Bizikleta

1st Stage 1

1st Clásica de San Sebastián
1st Giro del Friuli
2nd Overall Tour de France

1st Stage 17

2nd Overall Vuelta a Burgos

1st Stage 1

2nd Giro dell'Appennino
2nd Circuit de l'Aulne
4th Overall Giro d'Italia

1st Stages 2a, 10 (ITT) & 19

4th Subida a Urkiola
5th Overall Giro del Trentino
9th Tour de Romandie
10th GP Industria & Artigianato di Larciano
1992
1st Road race, UCI Road World Championships
1st Milano–Torino
1st Giro dell'Emilia
1st Giro del Lazio
2nd Overall Tour de Suisse

1st Stage 4 (ITT)

2nd Trofeo Melinda
3rd Overall Tour de France
3rd Overall Critérium du Dauphiné Libéré
4th Baden-Baden (with Laurent Fignon)
7th Giro dell'Appennino
7th Coppa Agostoni
7th Grand Prix des Nations
9th Escalada a Montjuïc
1993
1st Grand Prix of Aargau Canton
1st À travers Lausanne
1st Telekom Grand Prix (with Maurizio Fondriest)
1st Stage 3 Tour of Galicia
2nd Road race, National Road Championships
2nd Amstel Gold Race
4th Overall Euskal Bizikleta

1st Stage 2

4th Subida a Urkiola
7th Overall Critérium International
1994
1st Tour of Flanders
3rd Brabantse Pijl
3rd Trofeo Pantalica
4th La Flèche Wallonne
4th Gran Premio Città di Camaiore
5th Giro dell'Etna
6th Overall Euskal Bizikleta

1st Stage 4

7th Trofeo Laigueglia
8th Overall Giro d'Italia

1st Stage 3

8th Overall Tour Méditerranéen
9th Overall Paris–Nice
9th Giro di Toscana
10th Clásica de San Sebastián
1995
1st Road race, National Road Championships
1st Overall Tour Méditerranéen

1st Stages 6 (ITT) & 7

1st Coppa Agostoni
2nd Liège–Bastogne–Liège
2nd Züri-Metzgete
4th Overall Volta a la Comunitat Valenciana
5th Clásica de San Sebastián
8th Gran Premio Città di Camaiore
10th GP Industria & Artigianato di Larciano
1996
1st Stage 15 Giro d'Italia
1st Stage 20 Vuelta a España
1st Stage 1 Giro del Trentino
3rd Overall Tour de Suisse

1st Points classification
1st Combination classification
1st Stage 5

6th Giro di Lombardia
1997
1st Stage 10 Tour de Langkawi
1998
1st Stage 12 Vuelta a España
7th Giro di Toscana

=== Grand Tour general classification results timeline ===
Grand Tour	1986	1987	1988	1989	1990	1991	1992	1993	1994	1995	1996	1997	1998
Vuelta a España	—	—	—	—	—	—	—	—	—	—	56	95	84
Giro d'Italia	41	DNF	DNF	23	1	4	—	18	8	—	29	75	50
Tour de France	—	—	62	11	7	2	3	20	DNF	53	—	—	—

=== Classics results timeline ===
Monument	1986	1987	1988	1989	1990	1991	1992	1993	1994	1995	1996	1997	1998
Milan–San Remo	111	92	73	—	1	43	142	30	29	44	63	—	138
Tour of Flanders	—	—	—	34	12	—	—	43	1	37	—	—	—
Paris–Roubaix	Did not contest during his career												
Liège–Bastogne–Liège	—	—	19	96	7	17	—	48	57	2	40	—	82
Giro di Lombardia	15	25	2	27	13	—	20	—	—	20	6	30	—

=== Major championships results timeline ===
	1986	1987	1988	1989	1990	1991	1992	1993	1994	1995	1996	1997	1998
World Championships	—	62	—	10	3	1	1	DNF	—	DNF	12	56	53
National Championships	14	22	46	2	41	1	24	2	—	1	98	—	49

Legend
—	Did not compete
DNF	Did not finish
