= 1990 UCI Road World Championships – Men's road race =

Men's Individual Road Race
1990 UCI Road World Championships
- Rainbow jersey

Race details
- Dates: September 2, 1990
- Stages: 1
- Distance: 261 km (162.2 mi)
- Winning time: 6h 51' 59"

Medalists
	Gold	Rudy Dhaenens (BEL)	(Belgium)
	Silver	Dirk De Wolf (BEL)	(Belgium)
	Bronze	Gianni Bugno (ITA)	(Italy)

The men's road race at the 1990 UCI Road World Championships took place on Sunday September 2, 1990, in Utsunomiya, Tochigi, Japan over a distance of 261 kilometres (162 mi).

145 riders started, 57 classified finishers, winner's average speed: 38.01 km/h

== Final classification ==
Rank	Rider	Time
1st place, gold medalist(s)	Rudy Dhaenens (BEL)	06:51:59
2nd place, silver medalist(s)	Dirk De Wolf (BEL)	s.t.
3rd place, bronze medalist(s)	Gianni Bugno (ITA)	+ 0'08"
4	Greg LeMond (USA)	s.t.
5	Sean Kelly (IRL)	s.t.
6	Laurent Jalabert (FRA)	s.t.
7	Johnny Weltz (DEN)	s.t.
8	Andreas Kappes (GER)	s.t.
9	Maurizio Fondriest (ITA)	s.t.
10	Claude Criquielion (BEL)	s.t.
11	Piotr Ugrumov (URS)	s.t.
12	Miguel Indurain (ESP)	s.t.
13	Marek Szerszyński (POL)	s.t.
14	Federico Echave (ESP)	s.t.
15	Pello Ruiz Cabestany (ESP)	s.t.
16	Joachim Halupczok (POL)	s.t.
17	Iñaki Gastón (ESP)	s.t.
18	Martial Gayant (FRA)	s.t.
19	Steve Bauer (CAN)	s.t.
20	Pedro Delgado (ESP)	s.t.
21	Marino Lejarreta (ESP)	+ 0'14"
22	Alberto Leanizbarrutia (ESP)	+ 0'28"
23	Claudio Chiappucci (ITA)	+ 0'45"
24	Zenon Jaskuła (POL)	s.t.
25	Mario Kummer (GER)	s.t.
26	Gilbert Duclos-Lassalle (FRA)	s.t.
27	Atle Pedersen (NOR)	s.t.
28	Miguel Ángel Martínez (ESP)	s.t.
29	Jesús Rodríguez Magro (ESP)	s.t.
30	Dmitri Konyshev (URS)	s.t.
31	Peter Hilse (GER)	s.t.
32	Marek Kulas (POL)	s.t.
33	Uwe Ampler (GER)	s.t.
34	Hans Rudi Märki (SUI)	s.t.
35	Alex Kjel Pedersen (DEN)	s.t.
36	Robert Millar (GBR)	s.t.
37	Michel Dernies (BEL)	s.t.
38	Thierry Claveyrolat (FRA)	s.t.
39	Dag Otto Lauritzen (NOR)	s.t.
40	Laudelino Cubino (ESP)	+ 0'50"
41	Sammie Moreels (BEL)	s.t.
42	Stephen Hodge (AUS)	+ 1'06"
43	Gérard Rué (FRA)	s.t.
44	Erik Breukink (NED)	s.t.
45	Thomas Wegmüller (SUI)	+ 3'06"
46	Bruno Cornillet (FRA)	+ 4'56"
47	Franco Ballerini (ITA)	s.t.
48	Eduardo Chozas (ESP)	+ 13'12"
49	Dariusz Kajzer (GER)	+ 13'14"
50	Pascal Richard (SUI)	s.t.
51	Kyoshi Miura (JPN)	+ 16'19"
52	Frank Van Den Abbeele (BEL)	s.t.
53	Ronan Pensec (FRA)	s.t.
54	Rolf Järmann (SUI)	s.t.
55	Jörg Muller (SUI)	s.t.
56	Tony Rominger (SUI)	s.t.
57	Masatoshi Ichikawa (JPN)	s.t.
