= Luc Leblanc =

French cyclist (born 1966)

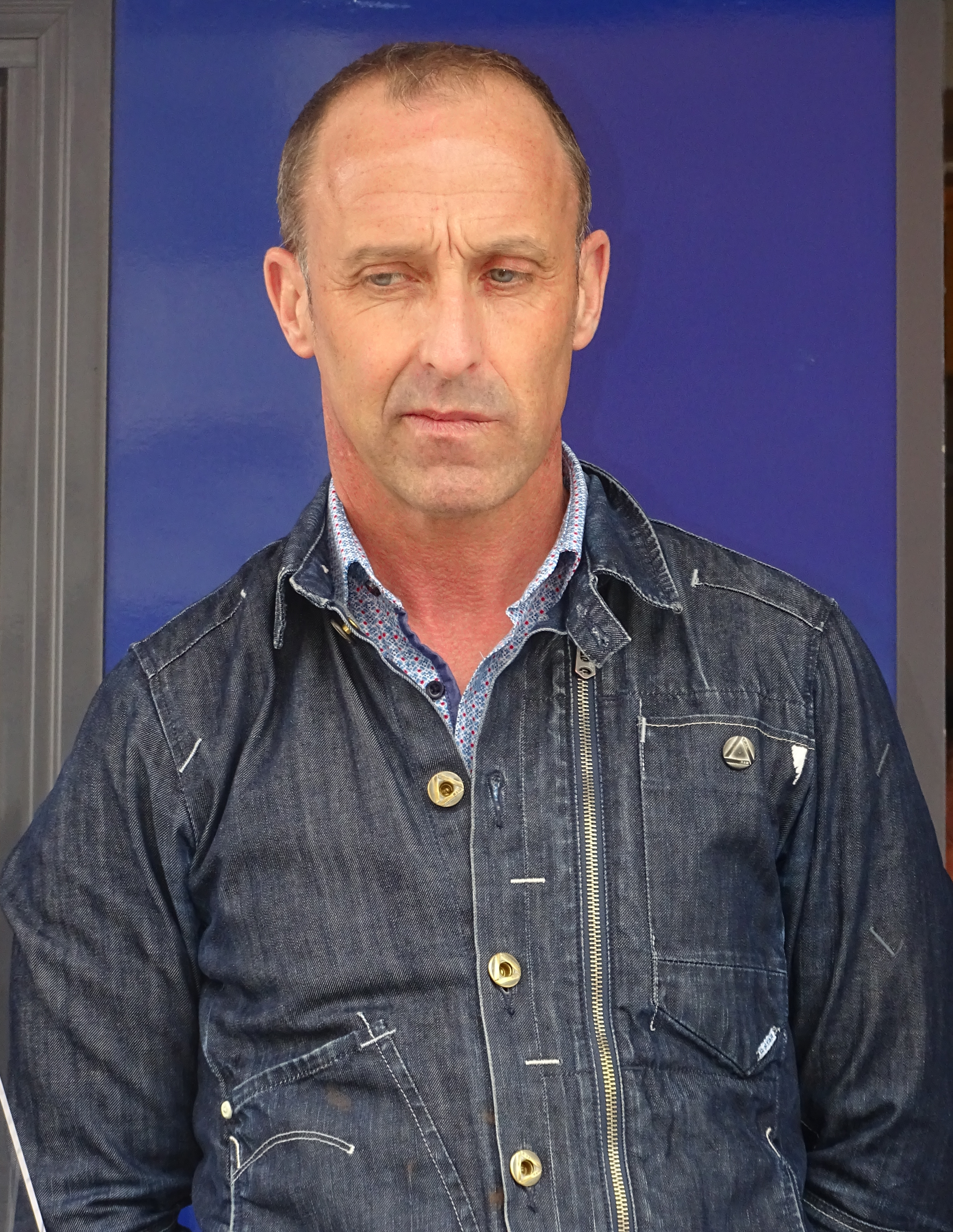

Personal information
- Full name: Luc Leblanc
- Born: 4 August 1966 (age 60) Limoges, France
- Height: 1.73 m (5 ft 8 in)
- Weight: 62 kg (137 lb; 9 st 11 lb)

Cycling career
- Sport: Cycling
- Current team: Retired
- Discipline: Road
- Role: Rider

Professional teams
- 1987–1988: Toshiba–Look
- 1989: Histor–Sigma
- 1990–1993: Castorama
- 1994: Festina
- 1995: Le Groupement
- 1995–1999: Polti

Major wins
- Grand Tours Tour de France 2 individual stages (1994, 1996) Vuelta a España Mountains classification (1994) One-day races and classics World Road Race Championships (1994) National Road Race Championships (1992)
Medal record
Men's road bicycle racing
Representing France
World Championships
Gold medal – first place	1994 Agrigento	Elite Men's Road Race

Luc Leblanc (French pronunciation: [lyk ləblɑ̃]; born 4 August 1966) is a French former professional road cyclist. He became a World Road Champion in 1994.

== Biography ==
In 1978, a drunk driver hit Luc Leblanc, aged 11, and his younger brother Gilles Leblanc, aged 8. Gilles died after the accident, and Luc was hospitalized for six months. After many operations, Luc was able to walk again, although his left leg was 3 cm shorter and weaker than his right leg.

Initially, Leblanc wanted to become a priest, but after a physiotherapist's advice to take up cycling to solve his leg problems, and subsequently Raymond Poulidor's advice to become a professional cyclist, he did not become a priest.

At the 1991 Tour de France, in the 12th stage Leblanc joined the decisive attack together with Charly Mottet and Pascal Richard. Mottet won the stage, but they finished 7 minutes ahead of the classification leader LeMond, which meant that Leblanc was the new leader. The next day, Leblanc finished 12 minutes behind the winner, and lost the lead to Miguel Induráin, who would remain the leader until the end of the race.

The yellow jersey that he received for leading the general classification, he gave to Poulidor. His accident years earlier did lead to operations on his injuries, and in the 1992 Tour de France the effects caught up with him and he had to stop on the stage to Alpe d'Huez. Again, in 1993, his legs hurt, nothing worked, and Luc Leblanc wanted to end his cycling career. However, the last thing he decided to try was to switch to teams and he joined the Festina team.

The next year, 1994, was his most successful year. At Festina, Leblanc won the 11th stage of the 1994 Tour de France ahead of Pantani and Indurain, and in the 1994 Vuelta a España he won the mountains classification. Later that year he won the 1994 UCI Road World Championships.

As a world champion, Leblanc had many offers from the world's best cycling teams. He joined Le Groupement, but the team's sponsorship ended one week before the 1995 Tour de France. Leblanc moved on to the Italian team Polti. Here, needing operations on his leg again, the results were not as expected, although he won one stage at the 1996 Tour de France.

In 1999, Leblanc was fired by Polti, because Leblanc was injured and could not continue his career. Later, the Italian court decided that the dismissal was unfair, and Polti should pay Leblanc. In 2007, Leblanc sued the French and Italian cycling authorities and the UCI because he still had not gotten the money.

In 2004, Leblanc became team captain for Chocolade Jacques in 2004.

Later, Leblanc became a consultant for a French radio station Radio Monte Carlo during the Tour de France.

== Doping ==
After his retirement, in a trial against Richard Virenque in 2000, Leblanc admitted that he had been using EPO to prepare for the Tour and the Vuelta.

== Major results ==
1986
4th Overall Circuit de la Sarthe

1st Stage 2

1987
2nd Road race, National Road Championships
4th Overall Tour du Limousin
6th Overall Grand Prix du Midi Libre
6th Overall Étoile de Bessèges
8th Overall Critérium du Dauphiné Libéré
8th Coppa Sabatini
1988
1st GP Ouest–France
3rd Overall Tour Méditerranéen
3rd Trophée des Grimpeurs
4th Overall Critérium du Dauphiné Libéré

1st Sprints classification

4th Tour du Haut Var
5th Overall Tour d'Armorique

1st Stage 2

6th Overall Paris–Nice
9th Overall Grand Prix du Midi Libre
1989
2nd Grand Prix de Cannes
2nd Bol d'Or des Monédières
3rd Overall Tour du Limousin
4th Paris–Camembert
5th Cholet-Pays de la Loire
1990
1st Tour du Haut Var
1st Grand Prix de Wallonie
1st Stage 5 Critérium du Dauphiné Libéré
2nd Bol d'Or des Monédières
3rd Overall Paris–Nice
3rd Overall Tour du Vaucluse
7th Overall Grand Prix du Midi Libre
10th Overall Critérium International
1991
1st Bol d'Or des Monédières
2nd Grand Prix de Rennes
3rd Classique des Alpes
3rd Trofeo Pantalica
4th Overall Grand Prix du Midi Libre

1st Stage 5

5th Overall Tour de France

Held after Stage 12

5th Overall Tour du Limousin
5th Road race, National Road Championships
8th Wincanton Classic
10th Overall Tirreno–Adriatico
1992
1st Road race, National Road Championships
1st Overall Grand Prix du Midi Libre

1st Prologue & Stage 4

2nd Overall Critérium du Dauphiné Libéré

1st Points classification
1st Stage 2

2nd Overall Tour de Picardie
2nd Classique des Alpes
3rd Paris–Camembert
3rd Grand Prix des Amériques
5th Overall Tour de Romandie
6th Overall Nissan Classic
8th Road race, UCI Road World Championships
10th Cholet-Pays de la Loire
1993
1st Stage 1 Tour du Vaucluse
6th Overall Tour de Romandie
7th Overall Tour du Limousin
1994
1st Road race, UCI Road World Championships
1st Stage 1 Euskal Bizikleta
1st Stage 4 Tour of Galicia
4th Overall Tour de France

1st Stage 11

6th Overall Vuelta a España

1st Mountains classification

1995
9th Overall Grand Prix du Midi Libre
1996
1st Stage 7 Critérium du Dauphiné Libéré
2nd Classique des Alpes
2nd Giro dell'Emilia
2nd Coppa Placci
3rd Polynormande
5th Overall Route du Sud
5th Giro del Piemonte
6th Overall Tour de France

1st Stage 7

7th Overall Paris–Nice
1997
1st Overall Giro del Trentino

1st Stage 2

2nd La Flèche Wallonne
4th Liège–Bastogne–Liège
7th Overall Tour of the Basque Country
9th Overall Critérium International
1998
2nd Road race, National Road Championships
2nd Boucles de l'Aulne
4th Overall Critérium International
4th Overall Rheinland-Pfalz Rundfahrt
6th La Flèche Wallonne
7th Overall Tour de Romandie
8th Trofeo Pantalica
9th GP du Canton d'Argovie

=== Grand Tour general classification results timeline ===
Grand Tour	1990	1991	1992	1993	1994	1995	1996	1997	1998
Giro d'Italia	—	—	—	DNF	—	—	—	DNF	34
Tour de France	73	5	DNF	—	4	—	6	DNF	DNF
Vuelta a España	—	—	—	—	6	—	—	—	—

Legend
—	Did not compete
DNF	Did not finish

== See also ==
- List of doping cases in cycling
- List of doping cases in sport
