= 1995 Paris–Nice =

Race details
- Dates: 5–12 March 1995
- Stages: 8
- Distance: 1,174.2 km (729.6 mi)
- Winning time: 30h 32' 32"

Results
Jersey awarded to the overall winner	Winner	Laurent Jalabert (FRA)	(ONCE)
	Second	Vladislav Bobrik (RUS)	(Gewiss–Ballan)
	Third	Alex Zülle (SUI)	(ONCE)

The 1995 Paris–Nice was the 53rd edition of the Paris–Nice cycle race and was held from 5 March to 12 March 1995. The race started at Fontenay-sous-Bois and finished at the Col d'Èze. The race was won by Laurent Jalabert of the ONCE team.

== Route ==
Stage characteristics and winners
Stage	Date	Course	Distance	Type	Winner
1	5 March	Fontenay-sous-Bois to Orléans	161.3 km (100.2 mi)		Wilfried Nelissen (BEL)
2	6 March	Saint-Amand-Montrond to Roanne	187 km (116 mi)		Laurent Jalabert (FRA)
3	7 March	Roanne to Clermont-Ferrand	168 km (104 mi)		Wilfried Nelissen (BEL)
4	8 March	Clermont-Ferrand to Chalvignac	~~174 km (108 mi)~~		Stage cancelled (Note: Stage annulled due to snowy weather conditions.)
5	9 March	Murat to Saint-Étienne	176 km (109 mi)		Lance Armstrong (USA)
6	10 March	Avignon to Marseille	178 km (111 mi)		Marco Saligari (ITA)
7	11 March	Brignoles to Mandelieu-la-Napoule	200 km (120 mi)		Pascal Richard (SUI)
8a	12 March	Mandelieu-la-Napoule to Nice	91.4 km (56.8 mi)		Fabio Baldato (ITA)
8b	12 March	Nice to Col d'Èze	12.5 km (7.8 mi)	Individual time trial	Vladislav Bobrik (RUS)

== General classification ==
Final general classification

Rank	Rider	Team	Time
1	Laurent Jalabert (FRA)	ONCE	30h 32' 32"
2	Vladislav Bobrik (RUS)	Gewiss–Ballan	+ 1' 40"
3	Alex Zülle (SUI)	ONCE	+ 1' 57"
4	Abraham Olano (ESP)	Mapei–GB–Latexco	+ 2' 30"
5	Stéphane Heulot (FRA)	Banesto	+ 2' 38"
6	Roberto Petito (ITA)	Mercatone Uno–Saeco	+ 3' 03"
7	Andrei Tchmil (UKR)	Lotto–Isoglass	+ 4' 01"
8	Viatcheslav Ekimov (RUS)	Novell–Decca–Colnago	+ 4' 23"
9	Yvon Ledanois (FRA)	GAN	+ 4' 35"
10	Serguei Outschakov (UKR)	Polti–Granarolo–Santini	+ 4' 50"
