= 1990 Tour du Haut Var =

Race details
- Dates: 24 February 1990
- Stages: 1
- Distance: 200 km (124.3 mi)
- Winning time: 5h 29' 25"

Results
	Winner	Luc Leblanc (FRA)
	Second	Claude Criquielion (BEL)
	Third	Alberto Elli (ITA)

The 1990 Tour du Haut Var was the 22nd edition of the Tour du Haut Var cycle race and was held on 24 February 1990. The race started in Sainte-Maxime and finished in Seillans. The race was won by Luc Leblanc.

== General classification ==
Final general classification

Rank	Rider	Time
1	Luc Leblanc (FRA)	5h 29' 25"
2	Claude Criquielion (BEL)	+ 7"
3	Alberto Elli (ITA)	+ 7"
4	Tony Rominger (SUI)	+ 7"
5	Roland Le Clerc (FRA)	+ 7"
6	Darius Kaiser (POL)	+ 7"
7	Atle Kvålsvoll (NOR)	+ 7"
8	Gérard Rué (FRA)	+ 7"
9	Pascal Simon (FRA)	+ 7"
10	Peter Winnen (NED)	+ 7"
