= Chaumeil =

- Commune
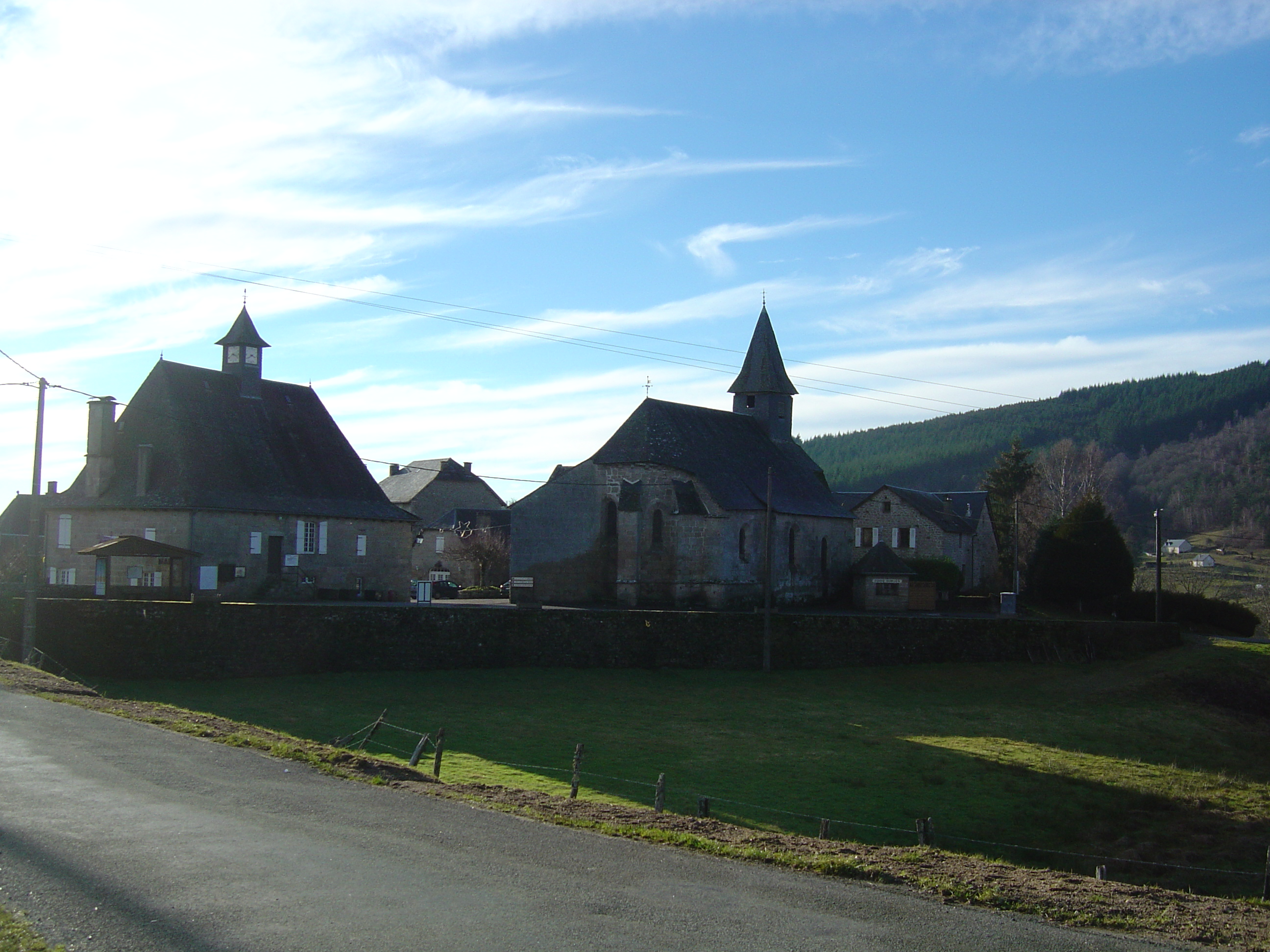
- The town hall and the church in Chaumeil

- Coat of arms
- Location of Chaumeil
- Location within France Location within Nouvelle-Aquitaine
- Coordinates: 45°27′25″N 1°52′57″E
- Country: France
- Region: Nouvelle-Aquitaine
- Department: Corrèze
- Arrondissement: Ussel
- Canton: Égletons

Government
  - Mayor (2026–32): Etienne Roger
- Area^{1}: 31.7 km^{2} (12.2 sq mi)
- Highest elevation: 911 m (2,989 ft)
- Lowest elevation: 524 m (1,719 ft)
- Population (2023): 164
  - Density: 5.17/km^{2} (13.4/sq mi)
- Time zone: UTC+01:00 (CET)
  - Summer (DST): UTC+02:00 (CEST)
- INSEE/Postal code: 19051 /19390
- ^{1} French Land Register data, which excludes lakes, ponds, glaciers > 1 km^{2} (0.386 sq mi or 247 acres) and river estuaries.

Chaumeil (French pronunciation: [ʃomɛj]; Occitan: Chaumelh) is a commune in the Corrèze department in central France in the Nouvelle-Aquitaine region.

== Toponymy ==
Chaumeil is mentioned around 1315 in the form Chalmelh. According to Marcel Villoutreix, it is a derivative of the pre-Latin term calmis " desert plateau " with the Latin suffix -iculus. The toponym therefore means " small moor " and it is attested elsewhere in Corrèze.

== Geography ==
=== Location ===
Chaumeil is located 22 km northeast of Tulle, 15 km north-west of Egletons and 10 km southeast of Treignac, in the heart of the Massif des Monédières.

The municipality is part of the territory of the Parc naturel régional de Millevaches en Limousin (Regional Natural Park of the Millevaches) in the Limousin. It is watered by the Corrèze, the Corrèze de Pradines, the Douyge and a stream from the pond (mother branch of the Vimbelle).

=== Population ===
Historical population
Year	Pop.	±% p.a.
1968	325	—
1975	270	−2.61%
1982	218	−3.01%
1990	188	−1.83%
1999	192	+0.23%
2007	159	−2.33%
2012	161	+0.25%
2017	158	−0.38%
2023	164	+0.62%
Source: INSEE

== Places and monuments ==
- The Croix de Chaumeil - a 16th-century stone cross in the village of Chaumeil.
- L'église Saint-Jacques - a 15th-century Gothic church, Romanesque apse with a covered 16th-century porch, inside a 16th-century wood polychrome pieta, Madonna and child and reliquary. The church was extended 17th and 18th-centuries.
- Maison des Monédières - gourmet food and handicrafts.
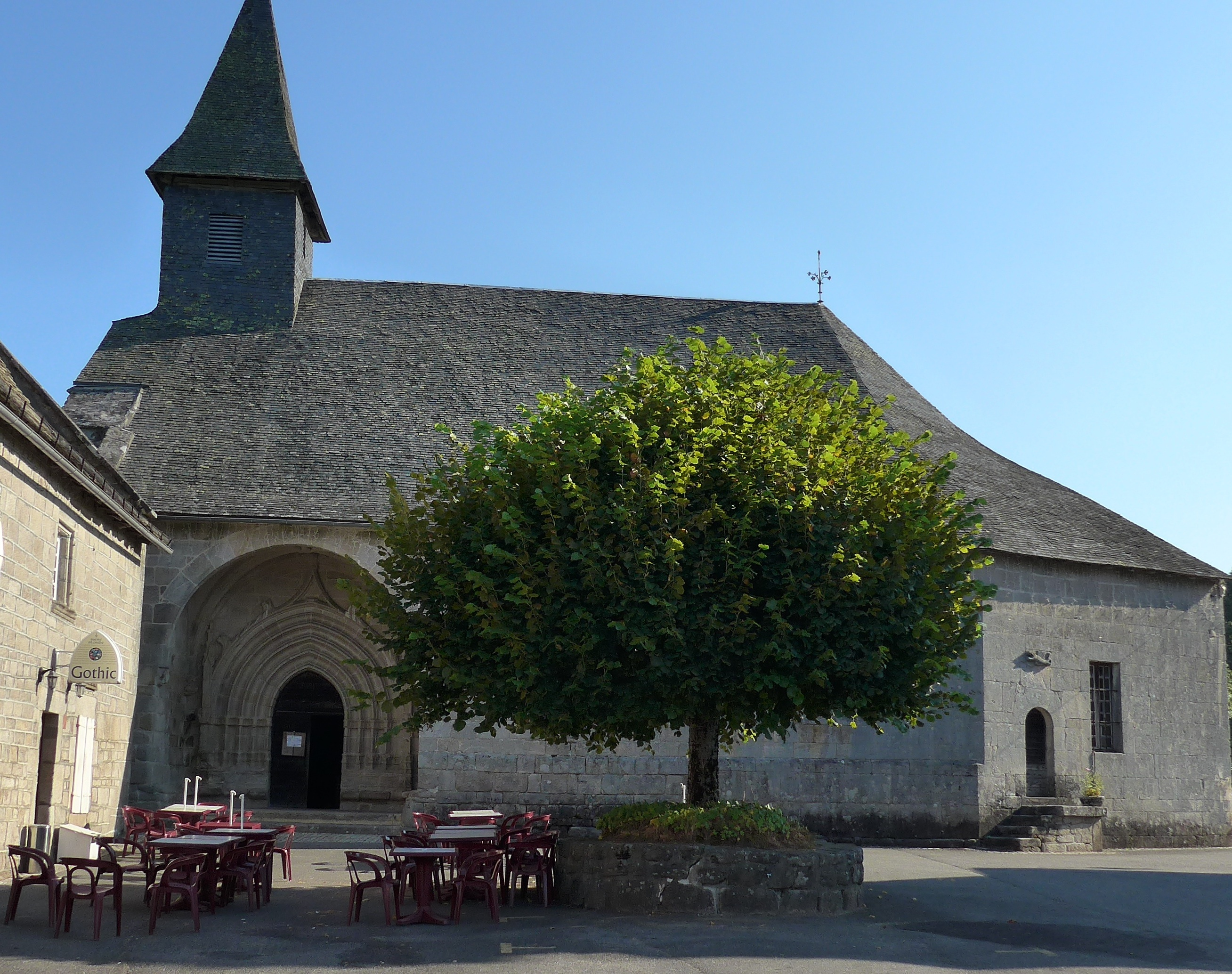
L'église Saint-Jacques.

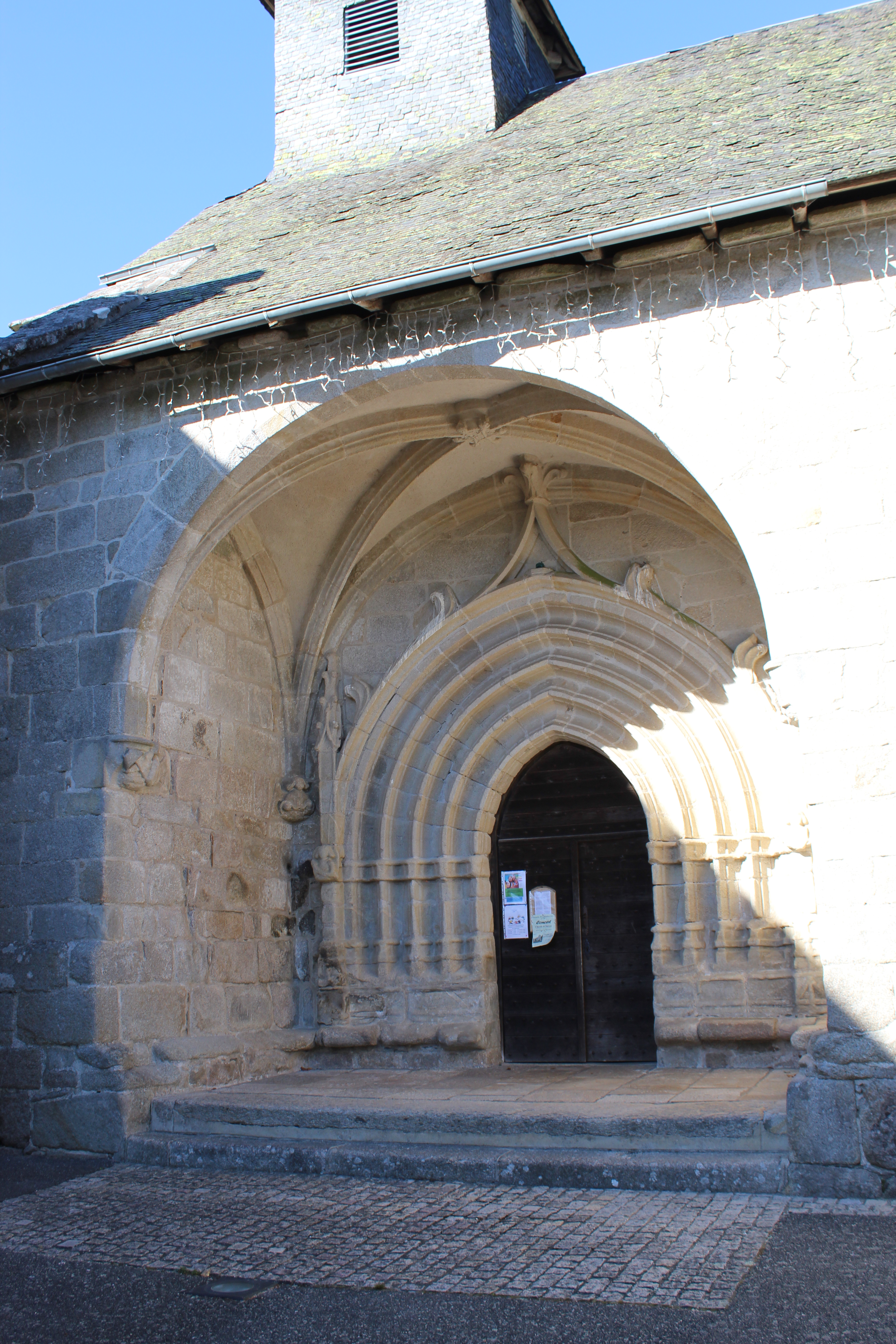
Church porch.

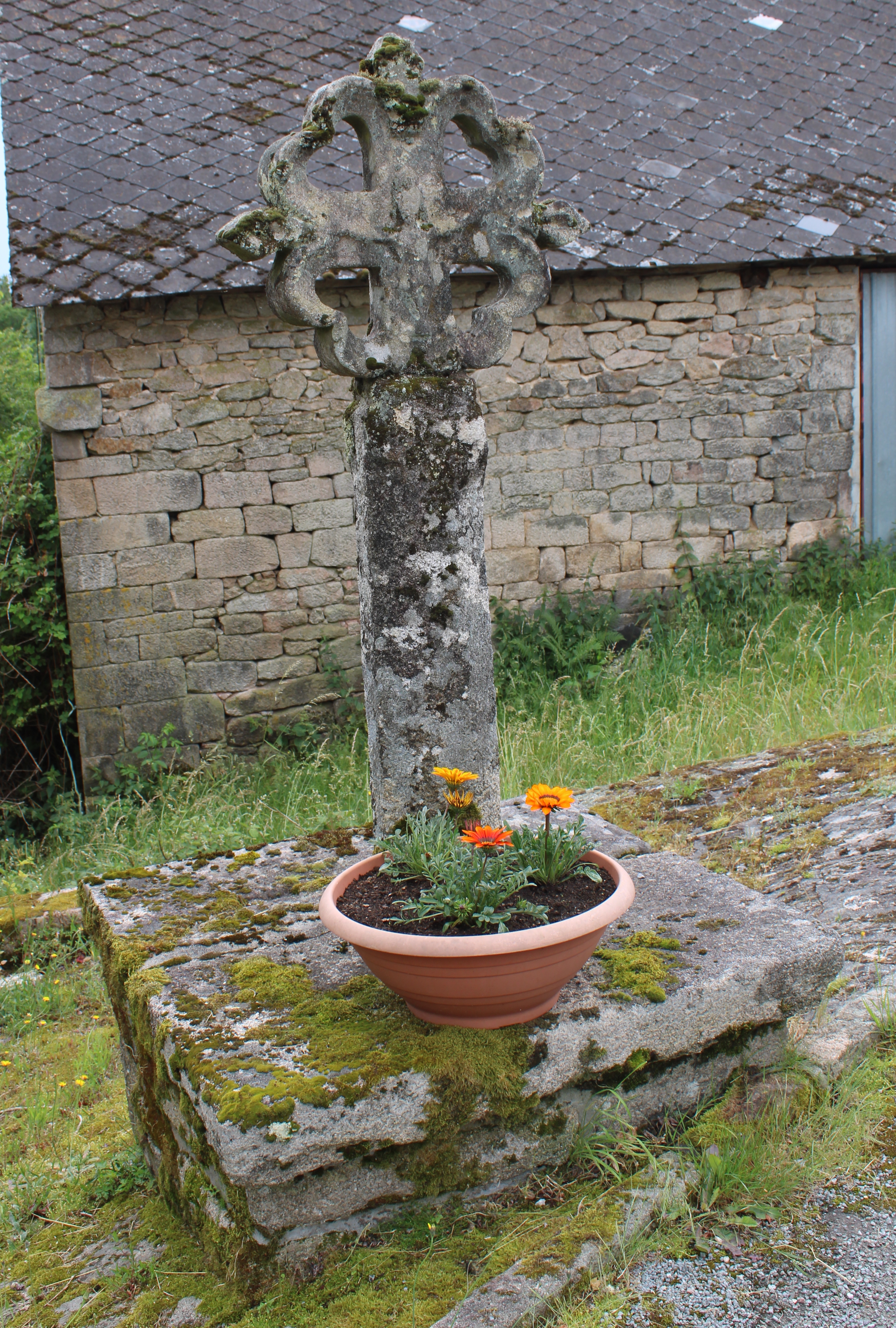
Croix de Chaumeil.

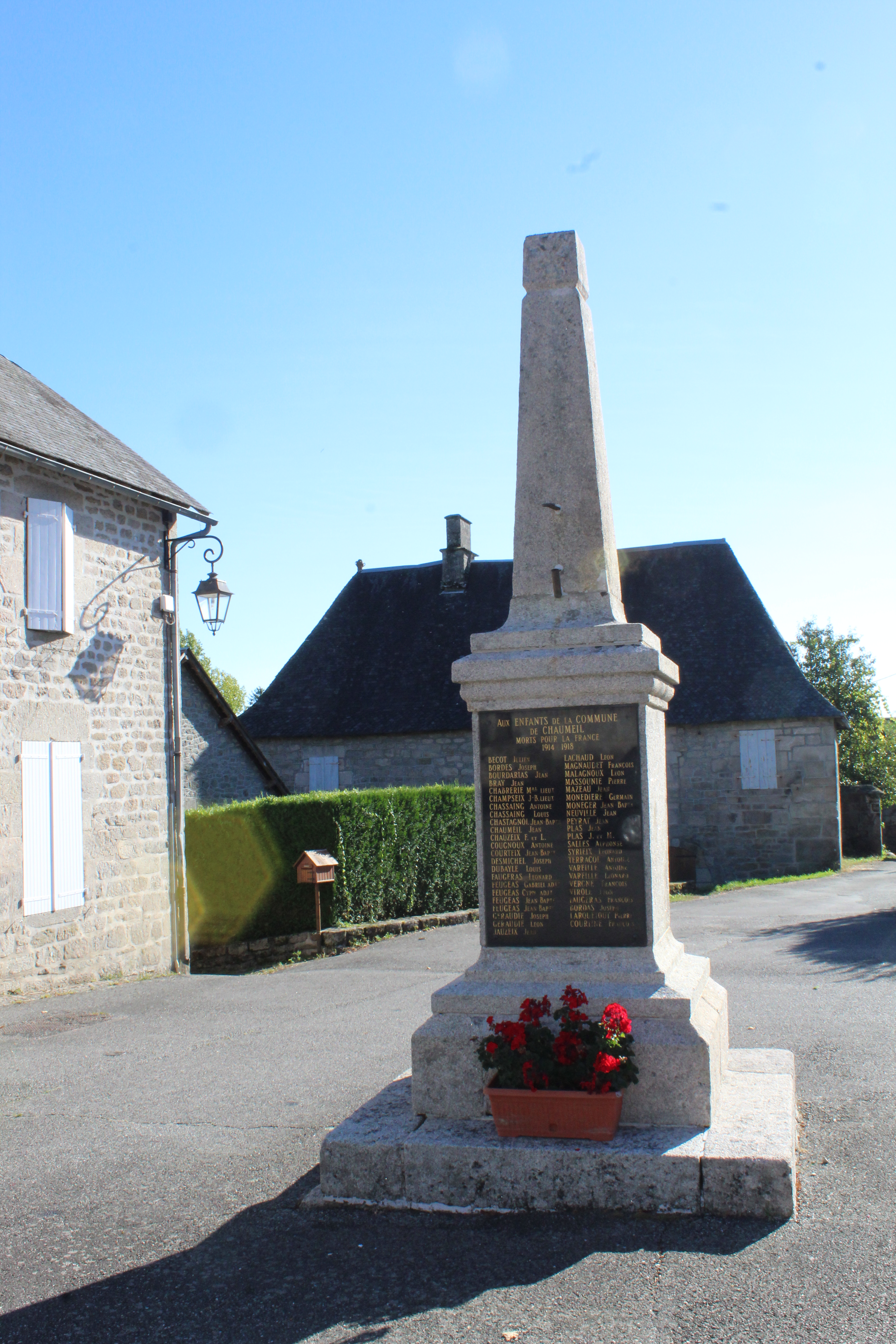
The war memorial.

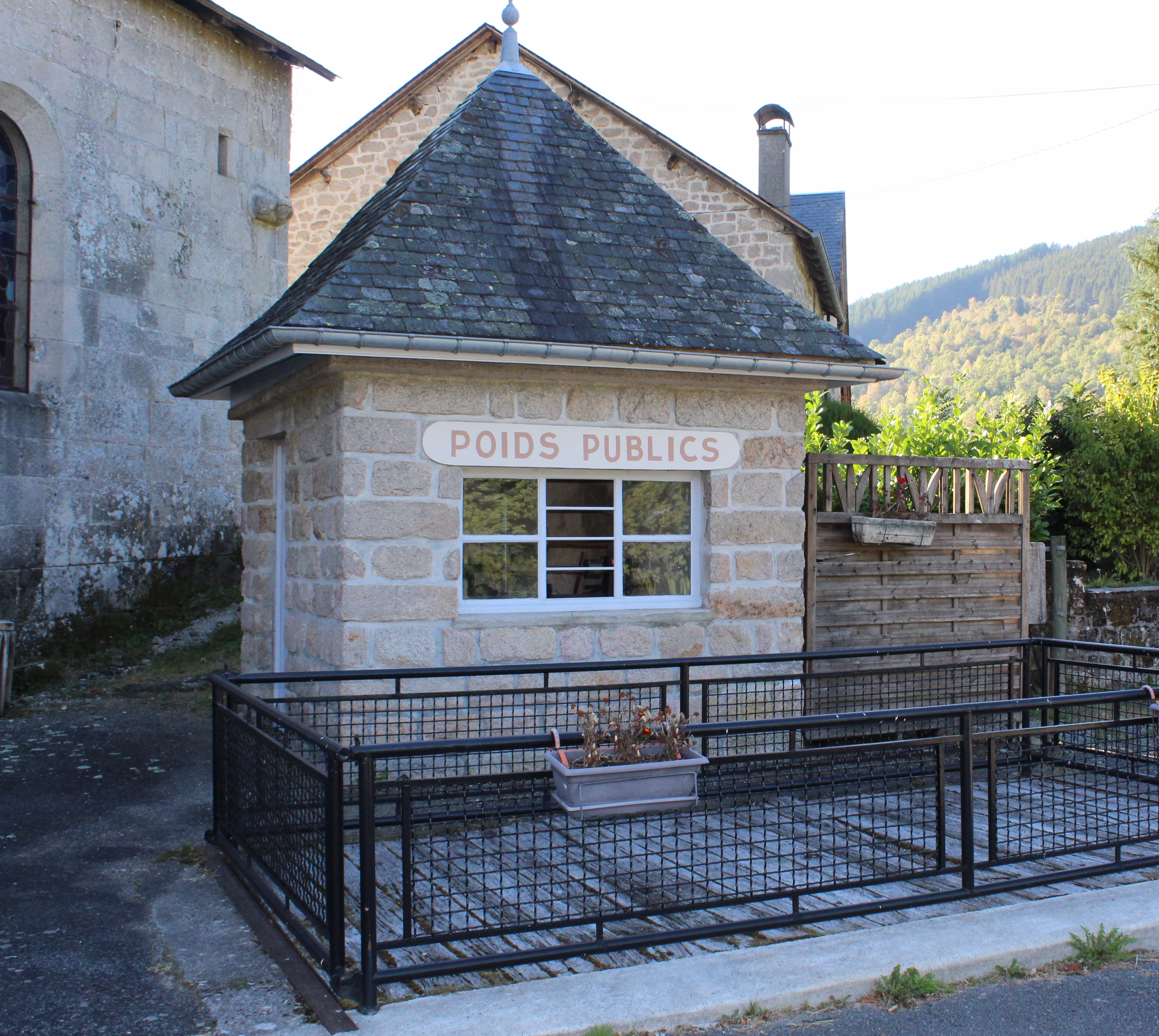
Weigh house.

=== Nearby ===
- Mas-Michel - small hamlet with thatched stone cottages.

== Notable people ==
- Jean-Baptiste Billot (1828-1907), born in the village of Chastagnol, general of the French Army, was a member of the National Assembly (1871-1875), an unmovable senator and three times Minister of War (1882-1883 and 1896-1898).
- Jean Ségurel, accordionist, and is also known for having created the famous Bol d'Or des Monédières cycling race in 1952.

== See also ==
- Communes of the Corrèze department
