= 1990 Giro del Trentino =

Race details
- Dates: 7–10 May 1990
- Stages: 4
- Distance: 668 km (415.1 mi)
- Winning time: 17h 14' 34"

Results
| | Winner | Gianni Bugno (ITA) |
| | Second | Piotr Ugrumov (LAT) |
| | Third | Leonardo Sierra (VEN) |

The 1990 Giro del Trentino was the 14th edition of the Tour of the Alps cycle race and was held on 7 May to 10 May 1990. The race started in Arco and finished in Trento. The race was won by Gianni Bugno.

== General classification ==
Final general classification

| Rank | Rider | Time |
|---|---|---|
| 1 | Gianni Bugno (ITA) | 17h 14' 34" |
| 2 | Piotr Ugrumov (LAT) | + 1" |
| 3 | Leonardo Sierra (VEN) | + 6" |
| 4 | Urs Zimmermann (SUI) | + 13" |
| 5 | Claudio Chiappucci (ITA) | + 32" |
| 6 | Claude Criquielion (BEL) | + 32" |
| 7 | Stefano Tomasini (ITA) | + 34" |
| 8 | Joachim Halupczok (POL) | + 35" |
| 9 | Maurizio Vandelli (ITA) | + 38" |
| 10 | Johan Bruyneel (BEL) | + 58" |
