= 1992 UCI Road World Championships – Men's road race =

Men's Individual Road Race
1992 UCI Road World Championships
- Rainbow jersey

Race details
- Dates: 6 September 1992
- Stages: 1
- Distance: 261 km (162.2 mi)
- Winning time: 6h 34' 28"

Results
| | Winner | Gianni Bugno (ITA) | (Italy) |
| | Second | Laurent Jalabert (FRA) | (France) |
| | Third | Dimitri Konyshev (RUS) | (Russia) |

The men's road race at the 1992 UCI Road World Championships was the 59th edition of the event. The race took place on Sunday 6 September 1992 in Benidorm, Spain. The race was won by Gianni Bugno of Italy.

== Final classification ==
General classification (1–10)

| Rank | Rider | Time |
|---|---|---|
| 1st place, gold medalist(s) | Gianni Bugno (ITA) | 6h 34' 28" |
| 2nd place, silver medalist(s) | Laurent Jalabert (FRA) | + 0" |
| 3rd place, bronze medalist(s) | Dimitri Konyshev (RUS) | + 0" |
| 4 | Tony Rominger (SUI) | + 0" |
| 5 | Steven Rooks (NED) | + 0" |
| 6 | Miguel Induráin (ESP) | + 0" |
| 7 | Piotr Ugrumov (LAT) | + 0" |
| 8 | Luc Leblanc (FRA) | + 0" |
| 9 | Luc Roosen (BEL) | + 0" |
| 10 | Jean-François Bernard (FRA) | + 0" |
