= Bol d'Or des Monédières =

French cycling race

Race details
- Date: August
- Region: Corrèze, France
- English name: Golden Bowl of the Monédières
- Local name: Bol d'Or des Monédières (in French)
- Discipline: Road
- Competition: Cat. 1.2 (1960->1989)
- Type: Criterium

History
- First edition: 1952
- Editions: 33
- Final edition: 2002
- First winner: Jean Robic (FRA)
- Most wins: Raphaël Géminiani (FRA); (3 wins)
- Final winner: Nicolas Vogondy (FRA)

The Bol d'or des Monédières was a cycling criterium that took place after the Tour de France, traditionally on the first Thursday in August. It was run on a circuit of about 20 kilometers to be covered seven times, around the village of Chaumeil, in the Massif des Monédières, Corrèze.

The competition's roll of honor includes the successes of Fausto Coppi, Jacques Anquetil, Rik Van Looy, Raymond Poulidor, Bernard Hinault, Laurent Fignon and Richard Virenque.

The last edition of the criterium took place in 2002. From 2005 onwards, the last stage of the Paris-Corrèze cycle race ended with five laps of the Bol d'Or des Monédières circuit.

Since the disappearance of Paris-Corrèze, the Tour du Limousin sometimes uses the Chaumeil circuit to perpetuate the tradition.

== Winners ==
Year	Winner	Second	Third
1952	(France) Jean Robic	(France) Jean Le Guilly	(France) Michel Brun
1953	(Italy) Fausto Coppi	(France) Jacques Vivier	(France) Georges Gay
1954	(France) Louison Bobet	(France) Valentin Huot	(France) Antonin Rolland
1955	(France) Jacques Anquetil	(France) Hervé Prouzet	(France) Max Cohen
1956	(France) Raphaël Géminiani	(France) Jean Le Guilly	(France) Louis Bergaud
1957	(France) Raphaël Géminiani	(France) Louison Bobet	(France) Louis Bergaud
1958	(France) Raphaël Géminiani	(France) Jean Graczyk	(France) Louison Bobet
1959	(France) Gérard Saint	(Italy) Ercole Baldini	(France) Henri Anglade
1960	(France) Valentin Huot	(France) Gilbert Salvador	(France) Raymond Poulidor
1961	(Belgium) Rik Van Looy	(France) Jean Stablinski	(France) Robert Cazala
1962	(France) Jacques Anquetil	(France) Raymond Poulidor	(France) Guy Ignolin
1963	(France) Raymond Poulidor	(France) Jean Stablinski	(France) Henri Anglade
1964	(France) Jean Stablinski	(Italy) Vittorio Adorni	(France) Georges Groussard
1965	(Italy) Vittorio Adorni	(France) Jacques Anquetil	(Netherlands) Jan Janssen
1966	(Germany) Rudi Altig	(France) Raymond Poulidor	(France) Jacques Anquetil
1967	(France) Raymond Poulidor	(France) André Foucher	(France) Lucien Aimar
1968-1981	No race		
1982	(France) Bernard Hinault	(France) Pierre-Raymond Villemiane	(France) Régis Clère
1983	(France) Jean-René Bernaudeau	(Portugal) Joaquim Agostinho	(France) Frédéric Brun
1984	(France) Éric Caritoux	(France) Frédéric Brun	(France) Robert Alban
1985	(Republic of Ireland) Stephen Roche	(France) Pascal Poisson	(France) Pierre Bazzo
1986	(France) Laurent Fignon	(France) Frédéric Brun	(France) Thierry Claveyrolat
1987	No race due to Tour de France stage arrival at Chaumeil		
1988	(France) Frédéric Brun	(France) Thierry Claveyrolat	(France) Jérôme Simon
1989	(France) Éric Caritoux	(France) Luc Leblanc	(France) Pascal Simon
1990	(France) Thierry Claveyrolat	(France) Luc Leblanc	(France) Ronan Pensec
1991	(France) Luc Leblanc	(France) Éric Caritoux	(France) Denis Roux
1992	(France) Richard Virenque	(France) Thierry Claveyrolat	(Republic of Ireland) Stephen Roche
1993	(France) Jacky Durand	(France) Gérard Rué	(France) Thierry Claveyrolat
1994	(France) Gilbert Duclos-Lassalle	(France) Ronan Pensec	(France) Jacky Durand
1995	(France) Laurent Jalabert	(France) Richard Virenque	(France) Eddy Seigneur
1996	No race due to Tour de France stage arrival at Tulle		
1997	(France) Cédric Vasseur	(France) Didier Rous	(Spain) Abraham Olano
1998	No race due to Tour de France stage arrival at Brive et Corrèze		
1999	(France) Stéphane Heulot	(France) Pascal Hervé	(France) Jacky Durand
2000	(France) Christophe Moreau	(France) Christophe Agnolutto	(France) Walter Bénéteau
2001	No race due to Tour de France stage arrival at Sarran		
2002	(France) Nicolas Vogondy	(France) Patrice Halgand	(France) Laurent Jalabert

== Popular culture ==
A short documentary about the race was made in 1968 (Au Bol d'Or des Monédières, 1952-1967).
