= 1991 Clásica de San Sebastián =

Race details
- Dates: 10 August 1991
- Stages: 1
- Distance: 238 km (147.9 mi)
- Winning time: 6h 04' 28"

Results
	Winner	Gianni Bugno (ITA)	(Chateau d'Ax–Gatorade)
	Second	Pedro Delgado (ESP)	(Banesto)
	Third	Maurizio Fondriest (ITA)	(Panasonic–Sportlife)

The 1991 Clásica de San Sebastián was the 11th edition of the Clásica de San Sebastián cycle race and was held on 10 August 1991. The race started and finished in San Sebastián. The race was won by Gianni Bugno of the Chateau d'Ax team.

== General classification ==
Final general classification

Rank	Rider	Team	Time
1	Gianni Bugno (ITA)	Chateau d'Ax–Gatorade	6h 04' 28"
2	Pedro Delgado (ESP)	Banesto	+ 55"
3	Maurizio Fondriest (ITA)	Panasonic–Sportlife	+ 1' 17"
4	Laurent Jalabert (FRA)	Toshiba	+ 1' 17"
5	Iñaki Gastón (ESP)	CLAS–Cajastur	+ 1' 17"
6	Gilles Delion (FRA)	Helvetia–La Suisse	+ 1' 17"
7	Bruno Cenghialta (ITA)	Ariostea	+ 1' 17"
8	Piotr Ugrumov (URS)	Seur–Otero	+ 1' 17"
9	Andreas Kappes (GER)	Histor–Sigma	+ 1' 58"
10	Charly Mottet (FRA)	RMO	+ 1' 58"
