= 1993 Tour de Romandie =

Race details
- Dates: 4–9 May 1993
- Stages: 5 + Prologue
- Distance: 769.7 km (478.3 mi)
- Winning time: 20h 42' 53"

Results
	Winner	Pascal Richard (SUI)	(Ariostea)
	Second	Claudio Chiappucci (ITA)	(Carrera Jeans–Tassoni)
	Third	Andrew Hampsten (USA)	(Motorola)

The 1993 Tour de Romandie was the 47th edition of the Tour de Romandie cycle race and was held from 4 May to 9 May 1993. The race started in Courtételle and finished in Geneva. The race was won by Pascal Richard of the Ariostea team.

== General classification ==
Final general classification
Rank	Rider	Team	Time
1	Pascal Richard (SUI)	Ariostea	20h 42' 53"
2	Claudio Chiappucci (ITA)	Carrera Jeans–Tassoni	+ 16"
3	Andrew Hampsten (USA)	Motorola	+ 1' 37"
4	Giorgio Furlan (ITA)	Ariostea	+ 2' 47"
5	Piotr Ugrumov (LAT)	Mecair–Ballan	+ 2' 52"
6	Luc Leblanc (FRA)	Castorama	+ 2' 56"
7	Pello Ruiz Cabestany (ESP)	Gatorade–Mega Drive–Kenwood	+ 6' 42"
8	Wladimir Belli (ITA)	Lampre–Polti	+ 7' 14"
9	Pavel Tonkov (RUS)	Lampre–Polti	+ 8' 09"
10	Jean-Claude Leclercq (FRA)	Jolly Componibili–Club 88	+ 8' 34"
