= 1994 Tour of Flanders =

1994 UCI Road World Cup
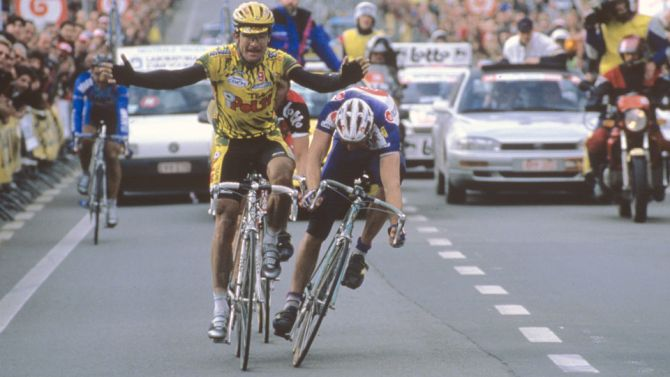
- Gianni Bugno beats Johan Museeuw to the line.

Race details
- Dates: 3 April 1994
- Stages: 1
- Distance: 268 km (166.5 mi)
- Winning time: 6h 45' 20"

Results
| | Winner | Gianni Bugno (ITA) | (Team Polti) |
| | Second | Johan Museeuw (BEL) | (MG-MG) |
| | Third | Andrei Tchmil (MDA) | (Lotto) |

The 78th running of the Tour of Flanders cycling race in Belgium was held on Sunday 3 April 1994. Italian Gianni Bugno won in a four-man sprint ahead of Johan Museeuw and Andrei Tchmil. The race started in Sint-Niklaas and finished in Meerbeke (Ninove).

== Race Summary ==
Defending champion Johan Museeuw had fallen behind early in the race because of a massive crash on Oude Kwaremont, forcing his GB–MG Maglificio team to chase for 30 minutes before returning to the front. On the Berendries climb, 35 km from the finish, a group of five was formed with Museeuw, Franco Ballerini, Andrei Tchmil, Gianni Bugno and Johan Capiot. Capiot was distanced on the Muur van Geraardsbergen and the four others headed to the finish. Museeuw, considered the fastest sprinter, reacted too late when Bugno initiated his sprint from afar and failed to get past the Italian. At the finish line, the difference between Bugno and Museeuw was 7 mm, the smallest winning margin in the history of the Tour of Flanders.

== Climbs ==
There were 16 categorized climbs:

- Tiegemberg
- Kluisberg
- Knokteberg
- Oude Kwaremont
- Paterberg
- Hoogberg-Hotond
- Kruisberg
- Taaienberg
- Eikenberg
- Volkegemberg
- Varent
- Leberg
- Molenberg
- Berendries
- Muur-Kapelmuur
- Bosberg

== Results ==
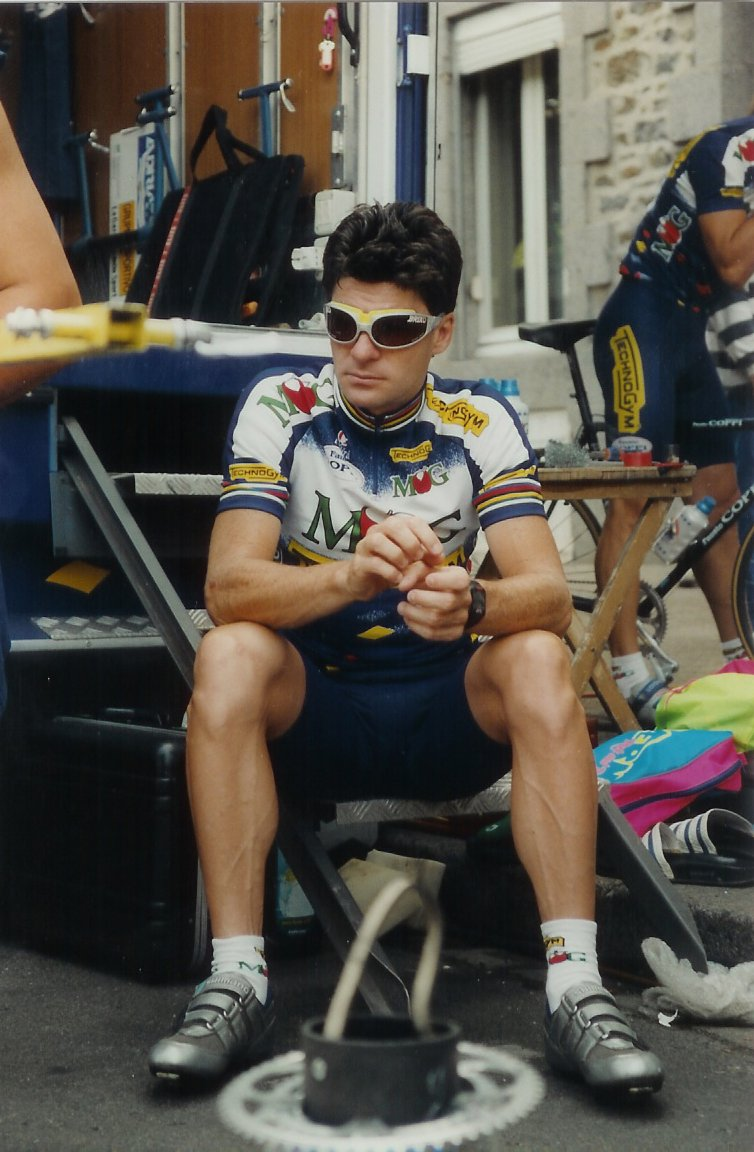
Gianni Bugno, winner of the 78th Tour of Flanders

| | Cyclist | Team | Time |
|---|---|---|---|
| 1 | Gianni Bugno (ITA) | Team Polti–Vaporetto | 6h 45' 20" |
| 2 | Johan Museeuw (BEL) | GB–MG Maglificio | s.t. |
| 3 | Andrei Tchmil (MDA) | Lotto | s.t. |
| 4 | Franco Ballerini (ITA) | Mapei–CLAS | s.t. |
| 5 | Johan Capiot (BEL) | TVM–Bison Kit | + 1' 11" |
| 6 | Fabio Baldato (ITA) | GB–MG Maglificio | + 1' 54" |
| 7 | Guido Bontempi (ITA) | Gewiss–Ballan | s.t. |
| 8 | Marc Sergeant (BEL) | Novemail–Histor–Laser Computer | s.t. |
| 9 | Edwig Van Hooydonck (BEL) | WordPerfect–Colnago–Decca | s.t. |
| 10 | Frank Corvers (BEL) | Collstrop–Willy Naessens | s.t. |
