= 1991 UCI Road World Championships – Men's road race =

Men's Individual Road Race
1991 UCI Road World Championships
- Rainbow jersey

Race details
- Dates: 25 August 1991
- Stages: 1
- Distance: 252.8 km (157.1 mi)
- Winning time: 6h 20' 23"

Results
	Winner	Gianni Bugno (ITA)	(Italy)
	Second	Steven Rooks (NED)	(Netherlands)
	Third	Miguel Induráin (ESP)	(Spain)

The men's road race at the 1991 UCI Road World Championships was the 58th edition of the event. The race took place on Sunday 25 August 1991 in Stuttgart, Germany. The race was won by Gianni Bugno of Italy.

== Final classification ==
General classification (1–10)

Rank	Rider	Time
1st place, gold medalist(s)	Gianni Bugno (ITA)	6h 20' 23"
2nd place, silver medalist(s)	Steven Rooks (NED)	+ 0"
3rd place, bronze medalist(s)	Miguel Induráin (ESP)	+ 0"
4	Álvaro Mejía (COL)	+ 0"
5	Kai Hundertmarck (GER)	+ 11"
6	Bjarne Riis (DEN)	+ 11"
7	Dirk De Wolf (BEL)	+ 11"
8	Stephen Hodge (AUS)	+ 11"
9	Davide Cassani (ITA)	+ 11"
10	Federico Echave (ESP)	+ 11"
