= 1996 Giro d'Italia =

Race details
- Dates: 18 May — 9 June 1996
- Stages: 22
- Distance: 3,990 km (2,479 mi)
- Winning time: 105h 20' 23"

Results
Jersey awarded to the overall winner	Winner	Pavel Tonkov (RUS)	(Panaria–Vinavil)
	Second	Enrico Zaina (ITA)	(Carrera Jeans–Tassoni)
	Third	Abraham Olano (ESP)	(Mapei–GB)
Jersey awarded to the points classification winner	Points	Fabrizio Guidi (ITA)	(Scrigno–Blue Storm)
Jersey awarded to the mountains classification winner	Mountains	Mariano Piccoli (ITA)	(Brescialat)
Jersey awarded to the intergiro classification winner	Intergiro	Fabrizio Guidi (ITA)	(Scrigno–Blue Storm)
	Team	Carrera Jeans–Tassoni	
	Team points	Panaria–Vinavil	

The 1996 Giro d'Italia was the 79th edition of the Giro. It began on 18 May with a mass-start stage that began and ended in the Greek capital Athens. The race came to a close on 9 June with a mass-start stage that ended in the Italian city of Milan. Eighteen teams entered the race that was won by the Russian Pavel Tonkov of the Panaria–Vinavil team. Second and third were the Italian rider Enrico Zaina and Spanish rider Abraham Olano.

Silvio Martinello led the race for four of the first five stages because of his victory in the first stage and high-placing on the fourth stage. Stefano Zanini briefly took the lead away from Martinello following the third stage that featured a more mountainous stage profile. After winning the event's sixth stage, Pascal Hervé overtook Zanini for the lead for a single day, after which Davide Rebellin captured the lead with his winning efforts on the seventh day. Eventual winner Tonkov obtained the race leader's maglia rosa (English: pink jersey) when he finished the thirteenth stage. Tonkov kept the jersey for the rest of the race, except where he lost it to Olano by 46 hundredths of a second at the end of stage 20, but regained it the following day.

In the race's other classifications, Brescialat rider Mariano Piccoli won the mountains classification and Fabrizio Guidi of the Scrigno–Gaerne team won the points classification and the intergiro classification. Carrera Jeans–Tassoni finished as the winners of the team classification, ranking each of the eighteen teams contesting the race by lowest cumulative time of each team's top three riders per stage. The other team classification, the team points classification, where the teams' riders are awarded points for placing within the top twenty in each stage and the points are then totaled for each team was won by Panaria–Vinavil.

== Teams ==
Eighteen teams were invited by the race organizers to participate in the 1996 edition of the Giro d'Italia. Each team sent a squad of nine riders, which meant that the race started with a peloton of 162 cyclists. From the riders that began the race, 98 made it to the finish in Milan.

The teams entering the race were:

- Aki–Gipiemme
- Amore & Vita–ForzArcore
- Brescialat
- Carrera Jeans–Tassoni
- Festina–Lotus
- Gewiss Playbus
- Glacial–Selle Italia
- Kelme–Artiach
- Mapei–GB
- MG Maglificio–Technogym
- MX Onda
- Scrigno–Blue Storm
- Panaria–Vinavil
- Refin–Mobilvetta
- Roslotto–ZG Mobili
- Saeco–AS Juvenes San Marino
- Team Polti
- TVM–Farm Frites

== Pre-race favorites ==
The starting peloton did not feature the 1995 winner, Tony Rominger. The three main contenders named by the media included: Evgeni Berzin, Abraham Olano, Pavel Tonkov. El País's Carlos Arribas felt Olano was a contender, but questioned his ability as an elite rider. Doctor Michele Ferrari named Evgeni Berzin, Olano, and Pavel Tonkov in order of the chance of winning the race. According to Arribas, Berzin was not in great form coming into the race, but his team doctor, Gianni Mazzoni, believed he could regain the form that helped him win the Giro in 1994. Berzin also had a fully committed team to support him this year, unlike in the previous edition where he and his teammate Piotr Ugrumov did not cooperate and worked against each other. Lluis Simon of El Punt felt Olano had performed better than Berzin in the recent Tour de Romandie.

Simon believed that with the absence of Marco Pantani due to a crash at Milano–Torino, the Italian with the best chance to win was Francesco Casagrande. It was thought that the route was designed to allow Pantani a good chance to win. Due to the large amount of mountains in the final week, Swiss Pascal Richard was thought to have a chance for a high ranking in the general classification. Latvian Piotr Ugrumov (Roslotto–ZG Mobili), at age 35, was thought to have a good chance for victory and potentially one of his last good chances to win a Grand Tour. Young Ukrainian Alexander Gontchenkov showed great potential during the early season and many thought he could be a rider to place high in the general classification. Two-time champion Miguel Induráin and Laurent Jalabert did not participate in the race.

== Route and stages ==
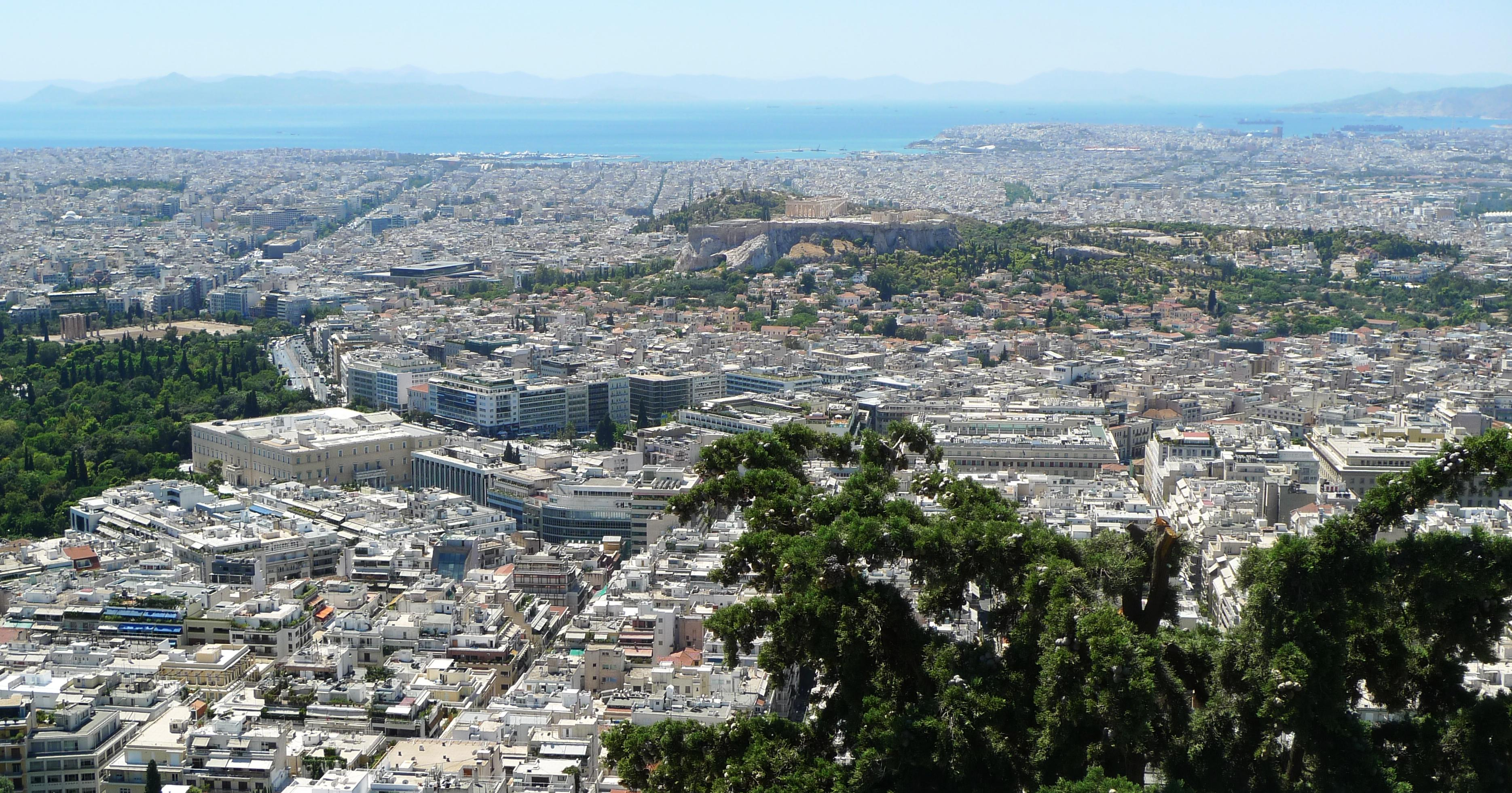
Athens hosted the start and finish of the first stage, while the race stayed in Greece for another two days before transferring into Italy.

On 12 May 1995, Athens was announced as the host of the start of the 1996 Giro d'Italia in order to honor the centennial edition of the Modern Olympics. The complete race route was unveiled by race director Carmine Castellano on 11 November 1995 in Milan. It contained one time trial event, an individual one. There were ten stages containing high mountains, of which four had summit finishes: stage 7, to Massiccio del Sirino; stage 13, to Prato Nevoso; stage 20, to Passo Pordoi; and stage 21, to Aprica. The organizers chose to include one rest day. When compared to the previous year's race, the race was 254 km (158 mi) longer, contained two fewer individual time trials, and the same number of stages.

The opening stage (known as the Grande Partenza) started in Athens, Greece, and the race stayed on Greek soil for three stages as it made its way to north-west Ioannina. The race then transferred to Ostuni located in southern Italy and the race gradually moved north. The sixth and seventh stages included a couple higher categorized climbs from the Apennines. The race continued to move north and enter the Alps starting in stage 13. The race's fourteenth stage finished in the French city of Briançon, which also served as the start for the next stage. Stage 14 included the climbing of the Col d'Izoard and the Col de la Madeleine, which was viewed as a key stage in the general classification race. After returning to Italian soil, stage 16 came to an end in the Swiss city of Lausanne, which also was the start for the seventeenth stage. The race traveled back east across Italy and going north into the Dolomites and heading west and turning south to reach the finish in Milan. In total, there were seven stages that start or finished outside Italy.

The 1996 route saw a decrease in the number of kilometers that were dedicated to time trials and the removal of the climbing time trial that had been a staple in years past. Lluis Simon of El Punt felt that the penultimate stage that crossed Mendola, Tonale Pass, Gavia Pass, Mortirolo, and Aprica would be the hardest of the race. Paolo Viberti, a writer for El País, believed that the race would be decided by the final week when the race entered the Alps and the lengthy individual time trial.

Stage characteristics and results
Stage	Date	Course	Distance	Type	Winner
1	18 May	Athens (Greece) to Athens (Greece)	170 km (106 mi)	Plain stage	Silvio Martinello (ITA)
2	19 May	Eleusis (Greece) to Naupactus (Greece)	235 km (146 mi)	Plain stage	Glenn Magnusson (SWE)
3	20 May	Missolonghi (Greece) to Ioannina (Greece)	199 km (124 mi)	Plain stage	Giovanni Lombardi (ITA)
	21 May	Rest day			
4	22 May	Ostuni to Ostuni	147 km (91 mi)	Plain stage	Mario Cipollini (ITA)
5	23 May	Metaponto to Crotone	196 km (122 mi)	Plain stage	Ángel Edo (ESP)
6	24 May	Crotone to Catanzaro	179 km (111 mi)	Stage with mountain(s)	Pascal Hervé (FRA)
7	25 May	Amantea to Massiccio del Sirino	164 km (102 mi)	Stage with mountain(s)	Davide Rebellin (ITA)
8	26 May	Polla to Naples	135 km (84 mi)	Plain stage	Mario Cipollini (ITA)
9	27 May	Naples to Fiuggi	184 km (114 mi)	Stage with mountain(s)	Enrico Zaina (ITA)
10	28 May	Arezzo to Prato	164 km (102 mi)	Stage with mountain(s)	Rodolfo Massi (ITA)
11	29 May	Prato to Marina di Massa	130 km (81 mi)	Plain stage	Mario Cipollini (ITA)
12	30 May	Aulla to Loano	195 km (121 mi)	Plain stage	Fabiano Fontanelli (ITA)
13	31 May	Loano to Prato Nevoso	115 km (71 mi)	Stage with mountain(s)	Pavel Tonkov (RUS)
14	1 June	Sanctuary of Vicoforte to Briançon (France)	202 km (126 mi)	Stage with mountain(s)	Pascal Richard (SUI)
15	2 June	Briançon (France) to Aosta	235 km (146 mi)	Plain stage	Gianni Bugno (ITA)
16	3 June	Aosta to Lausanne (Switzerland)	180 km (112 mi)	Stage with mountain(s)	Oleksandr Honchenkov (UKR)
17	4 June	Lausanne (Switzerland) to Biella	236 km (147 mi)	Stage with mountain(s)	Nicolaj Bo Larsen (DEN)
18	5 June	Meda to Vicenza	216 km (134 mi)	Plain stage	Mario Cipollini (ITA)
19	6 June	Vicenza to Marostica	62 km (39 mi)	Individual time trial	Evgeni Berzin (RUS)
20	7 June	Marostica to Passo Pordoi	220 km (137 mi)	Stage with mountain(s)	Enrico Zaina (ITA)
21	8 June	Cavalese to Aprica	250 km (155 mi)	Stage with mountain(s)	Ivan Gotti (ITA)
22	9 June	Sondrio to Milan	176 km (109 mi)	Plain stage	Serhiy Ushakov (UKR)
	Total		3,990 km (2,479 mi)		

== Race overview ==
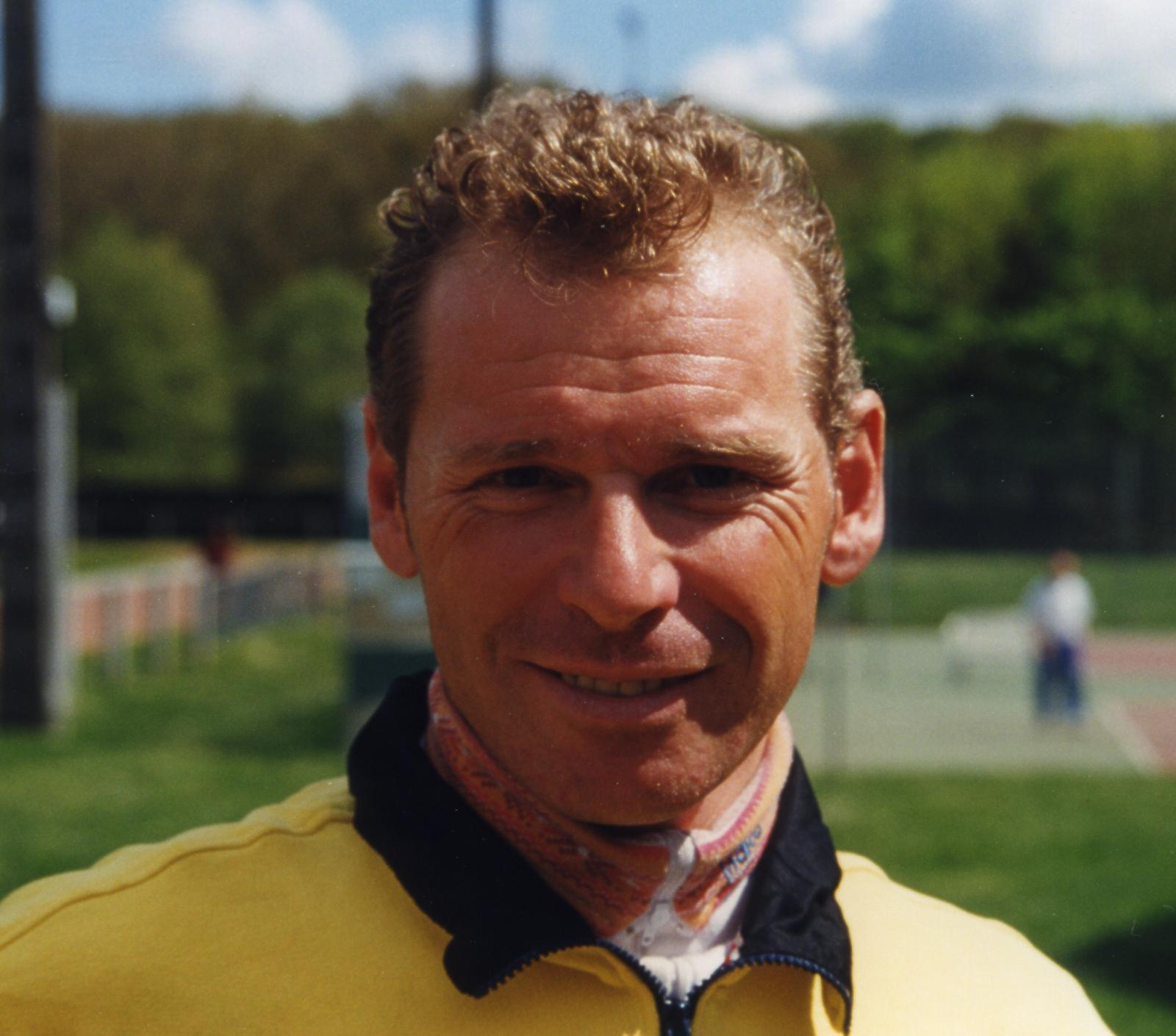
Pascal Hervé (pictured in 2000) gained enough time during the event's sixth stage to take the race lead, although he lost it following the next stage.

The first three stages took place in Greece, with several crashes on the opening stage due to the poor road conditions and encroachment from cars that resulted in the abandonment of a few riders. The day's breakaway obtained a maximum advantage of two minutes over the peloton, before being caught with 30 km (19 mi) left. Following an unsuccessful solo-attack by Serguei Outschakov, the stage culminated with a bunch sprint taken by Saeco–AS Juvenes San Marino's Silvio Martinello. The riders protested the conditions they were subjected to on the first stage by riding the second stage at a significantly slower pace than usual. The stage ended with a bunch sprint, won by Glenn Magnusson, that was limited in terms of organization for each team because of the narrowness of the roads. The third stage ended in the same fashion, with Giovanni Lombardi winning the day, while the race lead moved to Stefano Zanini because of time bonuses he earned for finishing high in the stage.

A rest day allowed the race to return to Italy by ferry – however, news leaked that the Carabinieri would search teams upon arrival in Italy for drugs (specifically, EPO). To avoid being caught, some teams returned to Italy by driving through the Balkans, and other teams "dumped their drugs over the side of the ferry".

During the fourth stage, several breakaways formed and were caught, with the final one being caught with under a kilometer remaining. Saeco took control of the peloton and successfully conducted a lead out for their sprinter Mario Cipollini who claimed victory. In addition, Martinello regained the race lead and with it, the race leader's maglia rosa (English: pink jersey). Ángel Edo of Kelme–Artiach team won his first sprint victory since the 1994 season on stage five. The sixth leg of the race was the first to feature several higher categorized climbs. Festina–Lotus's Pascal Hervé won the stage by a margin of four seconds and moved into the first place in the general classification. The seventh day of racing featured the first summit finish, to Massiccio del Sirino. Latvian Piotr Ugrumov attacked with seven kilometers to go and was able to distance himself from a group of contenders that included Abraham Olano, Hervé, Pavel Tonkov, and Davide Rebellin. Berzin made a move to follow with five kilometers remaining, a move that dropped Olano and Hervé. Rebellin attacked with three kilometers to go, which only Tonkov and Stefano Faustini could mark. As the trio reached the line, Rebelling edged out the other two for the win while also obtaining the race lead. In what was thought to be an easy day in the saddle, Claudio Chiappucci and two Carrera Jeans–Tassoni teammates made a move with ninety kilometers left in the flat, eighth stage. The trio of riders established a large enough lead to give Chiappucci the virtual race lead. Amore & Vita-Galatron and Saeco took control of the peloton and lifted the pace with under twenty kilometers left. Chiappucci's group was caught before the finish and the sprinter's set up for a field sprint, which was won by Cipollini.

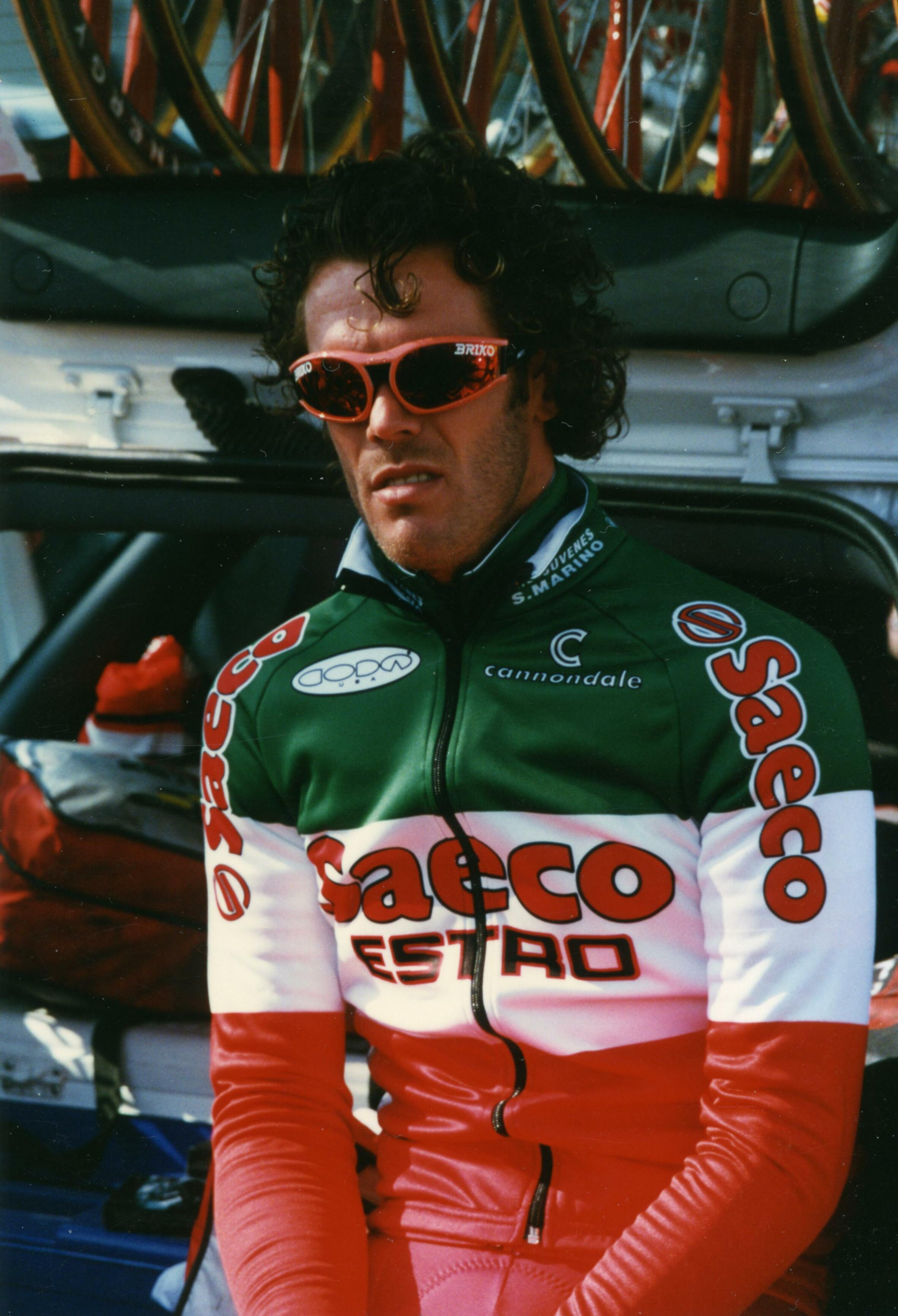
Mario Cipollini (pictured at the 1997 Paris–Nice) won the most stages at the race, with four.

The ninth leg featured more attacks from the Carrera team, particularly from Enrico Zaina who attacked throughout the stage's closing kilometers. The peloton finished in fragments to the numerous attacks that occurred in the final fifteen kilometers, with the winning attack coming from Zaina and Gontchenkov. Zaina dropped Gontchenkov near the finish and won the stage by four seconds over a large chasing group. The tenth leg was a mountainous stage that navigated through Tuscany. A group of six formed at the front of the race with eleven kilometers left from which Rodolfo Massi attacked and went on to win the stage. Behind the leaders, several general classification contenders made attacks, but all failed to produce any significant time gains. The eleventh stage resulted in a sprint finish won by Cipollini, as the race prepared to enter the higher and more difficult mountains. The twelfth stage witnessed the day's breakaway survive the encroaching peloton by two seconds. Fabiano Fontanelli won the sprint to the line between the surviving members of the original eight-man lead group, it was his fifth victory of the season that came from participating in a breakaway.

Panaria–Vinavil's Pavel Tonkov won the thirteenth leg because of a move he made with three kilometers left on the final climb Prato Nevoso. Piotr Ugrumov was the only rider to mark Tonkov, but he was dropped shortly before the finish and crossed the line two seconds after Tonkov. Rebellin crossed the line 33 seconds after Tonkov and ceded the lead to Tonkov. During the mountainous fourteenth stage, the group of general contenders re-grouped after efforts by Panaria–Vinavil to bring Tonkov up to the leading group before starting the ascent of the Col d'Izoard. On the climb, Pascal Richard attacked and rode solo over the mountain, while Chiappucci made an effort to bridge the gap but failed to reach Richard. Richard won the stage, Chiappucci crossed the line 43 seconds after Richard, while several race contenders finished just seconds after Chiappucci. 1990 Giro winner Gianni Bugno won the fifteenth stage as the top ten positions of the general classification remained the same and Chiappucci being the only rider to gain time on the rest of the top ten, gaining two seconds.

The sixteenth leg's breakaway initially started with nineteen riders. Alexander Gontchenkov attacked out of the group and rode solo to the finish to win the stage, while time gaps between general classification contenders again did not change. Laurent Roux and Nicolaj Bo Larsen started the breakaway during the seventeenth stage and did not get caught by the peloton, staying out in front for 228 km (142 mi). The peloton was gearing up for a chase with around 20 km (12 mi) to go, but race leader Tonkov suffered an issue with his bike and chose to wait for the team car to get another bike. This incident caused the field to slow their pace and wait for the leader, which caused the group to cross the line over sixteen minutes behind the winners. The next stage was won by Cipollini by means of a sprint finish, his fourth stage of the race. The nineteenth stage was a lengthy time trial that stretched from Vicenza to Marostica. Evgeni Berzin won the stage by a single second over Spanish rider Olano. Olano's performance on the stage brought him into second place overall by one second, while Urgrumov only managed to gain six seconds on Tonkov – placing him fourteen seconds behind.

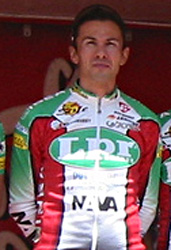
Pavel Tonkov (pictured in 2005) won a single stage en route to his overall victory.

The twentieth stage featured several high climbs in the Alps, including the Passo Pordoi, also the sight of the stage's conclusion. As the race entered the Marmolada, the day's breakaway had been captured and a select group featuring the likes of Olano, Berzin, Zaina, race leader Tonkov, Ivan Gotti, and Ugrumov led the way. Zaina made the first move from the group, which managed to only drop Berzin. Zaina attacked repeatedly and was able to rider alone until the finish atop the Pordoi to gain his second stage win of the race. Behind, Gotti gave chase, finishing 47 seconds down. In a dash to the line, Bugno edged out Olano for third place and the accompanying time bonus; however Olano did establish a one-second margin between himself and Tonkov, allowing him to take the pink jersey by 46 hundredths. The penultimate stage was filled with more climbs in the Alps, including the Passo di Gavia and the Tonale Pass. Serious attacks by race contenders began on the penultimate climb of the Mortirolo where Zaina started attacking first. Gotti, Tonkov, and Ugrumov followed Zaina's moves, while Olano was unable to follow. By the time Olano reached the summit of the Mortirolo, he was two minutes behind the leading riders. Gotti and Tonkov eventually dropped Ugrumov and Zaina on the final climb into Aprica. Gotti won the day, while Tonkov finished three seconds later and regained the lead by over two minutes. Olano's time loss during the stage moved him into third position overall. The race's final stage resulted in a sprint finish that was won by Serguei Outschakov. Tonkov won his first Grand Tour, and was the second Russian to win the race.

Two riders achieved multiple stage victories: Cipollini (stages 4, 8, 11, and 18) and Zaina (stages 9 and 20). Stage wins were obtained by eleven of the eighteen competing squads, six of which won multiple stages. Saeco–AS Juvenes San Marino amassed five stages wins through Cipollini and Silvio Martinello (stage 1). MG Maglificio–Technogym had three stages wins with Fontanelli (stage 12), Richard (stage 14), and Bugno (stage 15). Team Polti also collected three stages wins through Lombardi (stage 3), Rebellin (stage 7), and Outschakov (stage 22). Three teams won two stages. Amore & Vita-Galatron (through Magnusson on stage 2 and Bo Larsen on stage 17), Carrera Jeans–Tassoni (with Zaina), and Gewiss Playbus (Berzin on stage 19 and Gotti on stage 21). Five teams ended the race with one stage win: Kelme–Artiach (through Edo on stage 5), Festina–Lotus (with Hervé on stage 6), Refin-Mobilvetta (Massi on stage 10), Panaria–Vinavil (with Tonkov on stage 13), and Roslotto–ZG Mobili (Gontchenkov on stage 16).

== Classification leadership ==
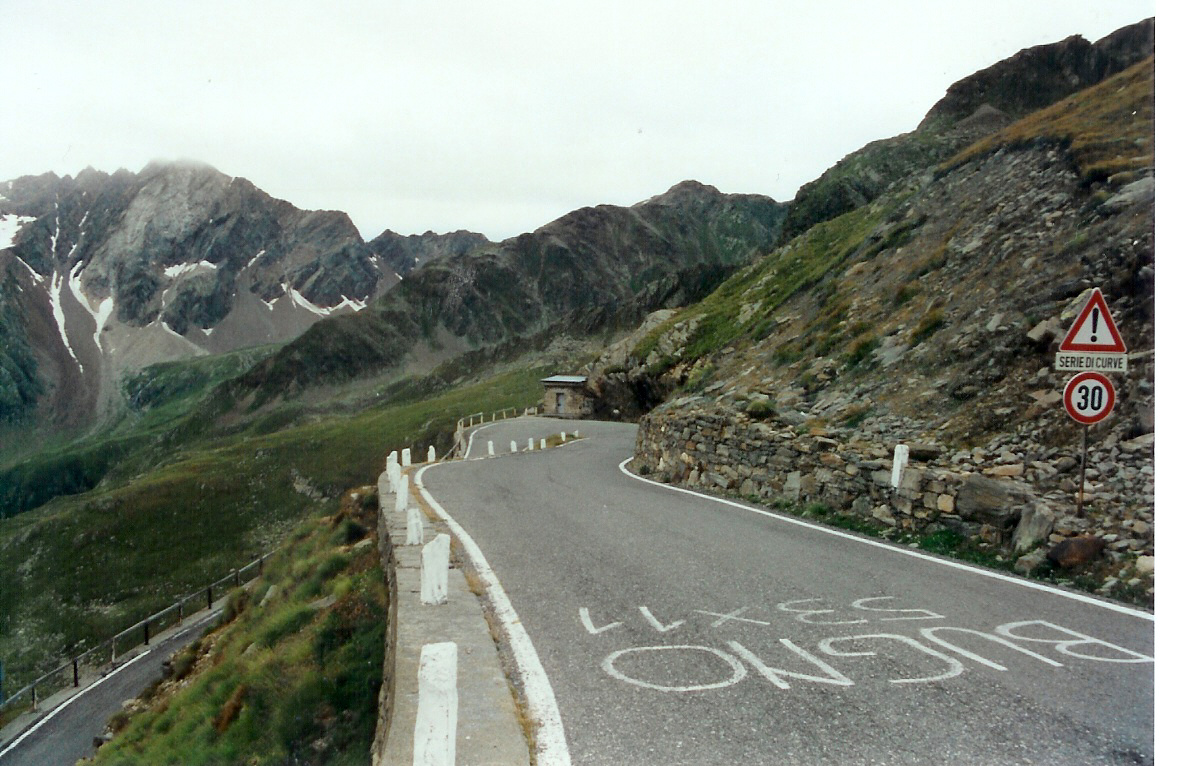
The Passo di Gavia was the Cima Coppi for the 1996 Giro d'Italia.

Four different jerseys were worn during the 1996 Giro d'Italia. The leader of the general classification – calculated by adding the stage finish times of each rider, and allowing time bonuses for the first three finishers on mass-start stages – wore a pink jersey. This classification is the most important of the race, and its winner is considered as the winner of the Giro.

For the points classification, which awarded a purple (or cyclamen) jersey to its leader, cyclists were given points for finishing a stage in the top 15; additional points could also be won in intermediate sprints. The green jersey was awarded to the mountains classification leader. In this ranking, points were won by reaching the summit of a climb ahead of other cyclists. Each climb was ranked as either first, second or third category, with more points available for higher category climbs. The Cima Coppi, the race's highest point of elevation, awarded more points than the other first category climbs. The Cima Coppi for this Giro was the Passo di Gavia and was first climbed by the Colombian Hernán Buenahora. The intergiro classification was marked by a blue jersey. The calculation for the intergiro is similar to that of the general classification, in each stage there is a midway point that the riders pass through a point and where their time is stopped. As the race goes on, their times compiled and the person with the lowest time is the leader of the intergiro classification and wears the blue jersey.

Although no jersey was awarded, there was also a classification for the teams, in which the stage finish times of the best three cyclists per team were added; the leading team was the one with the lowest total time. There was another team classification that awarded points to each team based on their riding's finishing position in every stage. The team with the highest total of points was the leader of the classification.

The rows in the following table correspond to the jerseys awarded after that stage was run.

Classification leadership by stage
Stage	Winner	General classification	Points classification	Mountains classification	Team classification
1	Silvio Martinello	Silvio Martinello	Silvio Martinello	Fabiano Fontanelli	Scrigno–Blue Storm
2	Glenn Magnusson	Silvio Martinello	Stefano Zanini	Fabiano Fontanelli	Scrigno–Blue Storm
3	Giovanni Lombardi	Stefano Zanini	Stefano Zanini	Fabiano Fontanelli	Panaria–Vinavil
4	Mario Cipollini	Silvio Martinello	Silvio Martinello	Fabiano Fontanelli	Scrigno–Blue Storm
5	Ángel Edo	Silvio Martinello	Silvio Martinello	Fabiano Fontanelli	Panaria–Vinavil
6	Pascal Hervé	Pascal Hervé	Silvio Martinello	Fabiano Fontanelli	Saeco–AS Juvenes San Marino
7	Davide Rebellin	Davide Rebellin	Silvio Martinello	Fabiano Fontanelli	Team Polti
8	Mario Cipollini	Davide Rebellin	Silvio Martinello	Fabiano Fontanelli	Team Polti
9	Enrico Zaina	Davide Rebellin	Silvio Martinello	Fabiano Fontanelli	Team Polti
10	Rodolfo Massi	Davide Rebellin	Silvio Martinello	Fabiano Fontanelli	Gewiss Playbus
11	Mario Cipollini	Davide Rebellin	Silvio Martinello	Fabiano Fontanelli	Gewiss Playbus
12	Fabiano Fontanelli	Davide Rebellin	Fabrizio Guidi	Fabiano Fontanelli	Gewiss Playbus
13	Pavel Tonkov	Pavel Tonkov	Silvio Martinello	Mariano Piccoli	Gewiss Playbus
14	Pascal Richard	Pavel Tonkov	Fabrizio Guidi	Mariano Piccoli	Carrera Jeans–Tassoni
15	Gianni Bugno	Pavel Tonkov	Fabrizio Guidi	Mariano Piccoli	Carrera Jeans–Tassoni
16	Alexander Gontchenkov	Pavel Tonkov	Fabrizio Guidi	Mariano Piccoli	Carrera Jeans–Tassoni
17	Nicolaj Bo Larsen	Pavel Tonkov	Fabrizio Guidi	Mariano Piccoli	Carrera Jeans–Tassoni
18	Mario Cipollini	Pavel Tonkov	Fabrizio Guidi	Mariano Piccoli	Carrera Jeans–Tassoni
19	Evgeni Berzin	Pavel Tonkov	Fabrizio Guidi	Mariano Piccoli	Gewiss Playbus
20	Enrico Zaina	Abraham Olano	Fabrizio Guidi	Mariano Piccoli	Carrera Jeans–Tassoni
21	Ivan Gotti	Pavel Tonkov	Fabrizio Guidi	Mariano Piccoli	Carrera Jeans–Tassoni
22	Serguei Outschakov	Pavel Tonkov	Fabrizio Guidi	Mariano Piccoli	Carrera Jeans–Tassoni
Final		Pavel Tonkov	Fabrizio Guidi	Mariano Piccoli	Carrera Jeans–Tassoni

== Final standings ==
Legend
Pink jersey	Denotes the winner of the General classification	Green jersey	Denotes the winner of the Mountains classification
Purple jersey	Denotes the winner of the Points classification	Blue jersey	Denotes the winner of the Intergiro classification

=== General classification ===
Final general classification (1–10)
	Rider	Team	Time
1	Pavel Tonkov (RUS)	Panaria–Vinavil	105h 20' 23"
2	Enrico Zaina (ITA)	Carrera Jeans–Tassoni	+ 2' 43"
3	Abraham Olano (ESP)	Mapei–GB	+ 2' 57"
4	Piotr Ugrumov (LAT)	Roslotto–ZG Mobili	+ 3' 00"
5	Ivan Gotti (ITA)	Gewiss Playbus	+ 3' 36"
6	Davide Rebellin (ITA)	Team Polti	+ 9' 15"
7	Stefano Faustini (ITA)	Aki-Gipiemme	+ 10' 38"
8	Alexandr Shefer (KAZ)	Scrigno–Blue Storm	+ 11' 22"
9	Jean-Cyril Robin (FRA)	Festina–Lotus	+ 12' 54"
10	Evgeni Berzin (RUS)	Gewiss Playbus	+ 14' 41"

=== Points classification ===
Final points classification (1–10)
	Rider	Team	Points
1	Fabrizio Guidi (ITA)	Scrigno–Blue Storm	235
2	Giovanni Lombardi (ITA)	Team Polti	130
3	Enrico Zaina (ITA)	Carrera Jeans–Tassoni	120
4	Davide Rebellin (ITA)	Team Polti	114
5	Pavel Tonkov (RUS)	Panaria–Vinavil	110
6	Abraham Olano (ESP)	Mapei–GB	109
7	Fabrizio Bontempi (ITA)	Brescialat	108
8	Zbiginiew Spruch (POL)	Panaria–Vinavil	99
9	Denis Zanette (ITA)	Aki-Gipiemme	96
10	Piotr Ugrumov (LAT)	Roslotto–ZG Mobili	88

=== Mountains classification ===
Final mountain classification (1–10)
	Rider	Team	Points
1	Mariano Piccoli (ITA)	Brescialat	69
2	Pavel Tonkov (RUS)	Panaria–Vinavil	37
3	Ivan Gotti (ITA)	Gewiss Playbus	36
4	Davide Rebellin (ITA)	Team Polti	33
5	Piotr Ugrumov (LAT)	Roslotto–ZG Mobili	29
6	Rodolfo Massi (ITA)	Refin-Mobilvetta	28
7	Alexander Gontchenkov (UKR)	Roslotto–ZG Mobili	21
8	Hernán Buenahora (COL)	Kelme–Artiach	19

=== Intergiro classification ===
Final intergiro classification (1–10)
	Rider	Team	Time
1	Fabrizio Guidi (ITA)	Scrigno–Blue Storm	59h 36' 45"
2	Fabrizio Bontempi (ITA)	Brescialat	+ 15"
3	Mauro Bettin (ITA)	Refin-Mobilvetta	+ 1' 37"
4	Davide Bramati (ITA)	Scrigno–Blue Storm	+ 2' 13"
5	Abraham Olano (ESP)	Mapei–GB	+ 2' 40"
6	Evgeni Berzin (RUS)	Gewiss Playbus	+ 2' 46"
7	Giovanni Lombardi (ITA)	Team Polti	+ 2' 52"
8	Mariano Piccoli (ITA)	Brescialat	+ 2' 54"
9	Alexander Gontchenkov (UKR)	Roslotto–ZG Mobili	+ 3' 22"
10	Marco Saligari (ITA)	MG Maglificio–Technogym	+ 3' 37"

=== Team classification ===
Final team classification (1–10)
	Team	Time
1	Carrera Jeans–Tassoni	316h 40' 46"
2	Mapei–GB	+ 2' 33"
3	Gewiss Playbus	+ 8' 21"
4	Festina–Lotus	+ 16' 37"
5	Team Polti	+ 53' 13"
6	Panaria–Vinavil	+ 1h 04' 05"
7	Aki-Gipiemme	+ 1h 09' 46"
8	Roslotto–ZG Mobili	+ 1h 40' 20"
9	MG Maglificio–Technogym	+ 1h 43' 18"
10	Brescialat	+ 2h 07' 37"

=== Team points classification ===
Final team points classification (1–10)
	Team	Points
1	Panaria–Vinavil	468
2	Carrera Jeans–Tassoni	426
3	Saeco–AS Juvenes San Marino	401
4	Team Polti	357
5	Scrigno–Blue Storm	352
6	Aki-Gipiemme	346
7	Team Polti	332
8	Mapei–GB	324
9	Brescialat	285
10	Gewiss Playbus	260

=== Minor classifications ===
Other less well-known classifications, whose leaders did not receive a special jersey, were awarded during the Giro. Other awards included the most combative classification, which was a compilation of points gained for position on crossing intermediate sprints, mountain passes and stage finishes. Italian Fabrizio Guidi won the most combative classification. Teams were given penalty points for minor technical infringements. Riso Scotti–MG Maglificio and Kross–Selle Italia were the most successful in avoiding penalties, and so were both winners of the Fair Play classification.
