= 1994 UCI Road World Championships – Men's road race =

Men's Individual Road Race
1994 UCI Road World Championships
- Rainbow jersey

Race details
- Dates: 28 August 1994
- Stages: 1
- Distance: 251 km (156.0 mi)
- Winning time: 6h 33' 54"

Results
	Winner	Luc Leblanc (FRA)	(France)
	Second	Claudio Chiappucci (ITA)	(Italy)
	Third	Richard Virenque (FRA)	(France)

The men's road race at the 1994 UCI Road World Championships was the 61st edition of the event. The race took place on Sunday 28 August 1994 in Agrigento, Italy. The race was won by Luc Leblanc of France.

== Final classification ==
General classification (1–10)

Rank	Rider	Time
1st place, gold medalist(s)	Luc Leblanc (FRA)	6h 33' 54"
2nd place, silver medalist(s)	Claudio Chiappucci (ITA)	+ 9"
3rd place, bronze medalist(s)	Richard Virenque (FRA)	+ 9"
4	Massimo Ghirotto (ITA)	+ 9"
5	Dimitri Konyshev (RUS)	+ 15"
6	Rolf Sørensen (DEN)	+ 42"
7	Lance Armstrong (USA)	+ 48"
8	Laudelino Cubino (ESP)	+ 52"
9	Bjarne Riis (DEN)	+ 52"
10	Piotr Ugrumov (LAT)	+ 59"
