= 1994 Giro di Lombardia =

Race details
- Dates: 8 October 1994
- Stages: 1
- Distance: 244 km (151.6 mi)
- Winning time: 6h 03' 21"

Results
	Winner	Vladislav Bobrik (RUS)	(Gewiss–Ballan)
	Second	Claudio Chiappucci (ITA)	(Carrera Jeans–Tassoni)
	Third	Pascal Richard (SUI)	(GB–MG Maglificio)

The 1994 Giro di Lombardia was the 88th edition of the Giro di Lombardia cycle race and was held on 8 October 1994. The race started and finished in Monza. The race was won by Vladislav Bobrik of the Gewiss–Ballan team.

== General classification ==
Final general classification

Rank	Rider	Team	Time
1	Vladislav Bobrik (RUS)	Gewiss–Ballan	6h 03' 21"
2	Claudio Chiappucci (ITA)	Carrera Jeans–Tassoni	+ 2"
3	Pascal Richard (SUI)	GB–MG Maglificio	+ 3"
4	Dimitri Konyshev (RUS)	Jolly Componibili–Cage	+ 25"
5	Maurizio Fondriest (ITA)	Lampre–Panaria	+ 25"
6	Davide Cassani (ITA)	GB–MG Maglificio	+ 25"
7	Bjarne Riis (DEN)	Gewiss–Ballan	+ 30"
8	Udo Bölts (GER)	Team Telekom	+ 30"
9	Mauro Gianetti (SUI)	Mapei–CLAS	+ 30"
10	Maarten den Bakker (NED)	TVM–Bison Kit	+ 36"
