= Piotr Ugrumov =

Russian cyclist

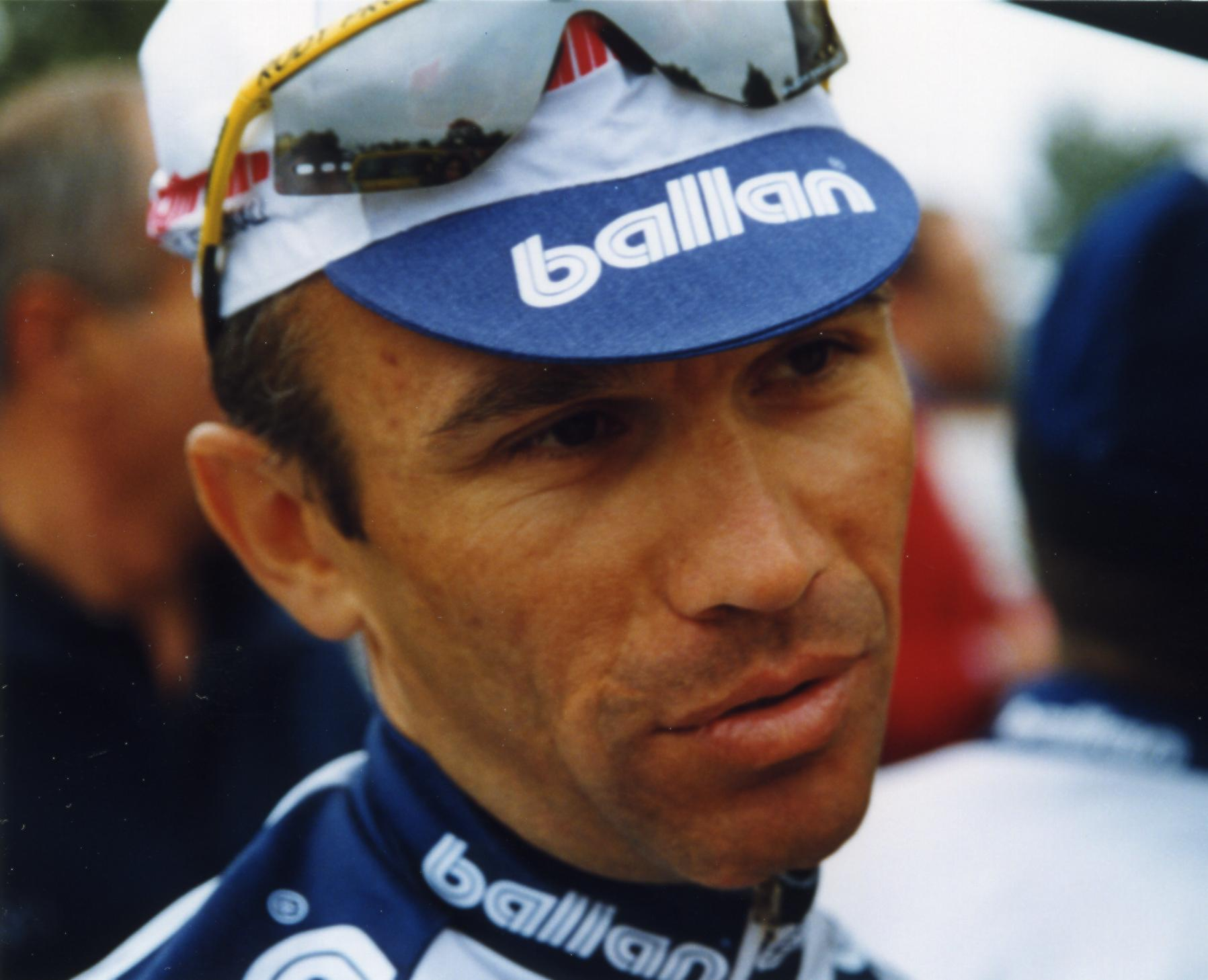

Personal information
- Full name: Pēteris Ugrjumovs
- Born: 21 January 1961 (age 65) Riga, Latvia

Cycling career
- Sport: Cycling
- Discipline: Road
- Role: Rider
- Rider type: Climbing specialist

Professional teams
- 1989–1990: Alfa Lum
- 1991–1992: Seur
- 1993–1995: Gewiss–Ballan
- 1996–1997: Roslotto–ZG Mobili
- 1998–1999: Alessio–Bianchi

Major wins
- Grand Tours Tour de France 2 individual stages (1994) Giro d'Italia 1 individual stage (1993)

Piotr Ugrumov (Latvian: Pēteris Ugrjumovs or Pjotrs Ugrjumovs, Russian: Пётр Угрюмов) (born 21 January 1961) is a former Russian-Latvian professional road racing cyclist who participated for Latvia after the dissolution of the Soviet Union, though he was a part of the Russian delegation at the 1996 Summer Olympics. His career as a professional lasted from 1989 to 1999, he had ten victories. Ugrumov finished second at the 1994 Tour de France. Between 1990 and 1996, he came in the Top 10 of seven Grand Tours, four in the Giro, two in the Tour and one in the Vuelta.

== Career ==
He was born in Riga in 1961, and displayed his potential for stage race racing with a stage win at the 1984 Baby Giro. As an amateur he was part of the Soviet national team for the Olympic Games, and won three USSR national championships, as well as stages in the Tour de l'Avenir and the Peace Race, in which he finished on the podium.

He rode for Alfa Lum in 1989 and 1990, as part of a team of Soviet riders transitioning to professionalism, which included Dmitri Konyshev, Vladimir Poulnikov and Djamolidine Abdoujaparov, by which stage he was already 28. Competing at the 1989 Giro d'Italia he won the Young Rider classification. He had a top-ten finish the following year, finishing eighth on the general classification at the 1990 Giro d'Italia. He won the Vuelta a Asturias and the Luis Ocaña Trophy in 1991, riding for the Seur cycling team.

He went on to finish second overall behind Miguel Indurain at the 1993 Giro. His finish of just 58 seconds behind Indurain, the shortest distance to the runner-up in his seven Grand Tour victories, was considered a surprise result. Many had expected home favourite Claudio Chiappucci to be the contender closest to Indurain. However for some, such as Manolo Saiz on the race commentary, his past success as an amateur showed the need of some of the Soviet riders to have time to adapt to professionalism.

He skipped the Giro in 1994 and instead had a second-place finish at the 1994 Tour de France in July, finishing behind Indurain in Paris, but winning back-to-back stages in the Alps, including the final individual mountain time trial, finishing over 90 seconds clear of Marco Pantani and over three minutes ahead of Indurain. He almost had three wins in a row, as he also finished second on another mountain stage at Val Torrens, where he towed Colombian Nelson Rodriguez to the finish only to have him come around him for the victory at the line. Those Alpine efforts saw him jumping from ninth to second place overall in the final week of the race having previously been 14 minutes behind the overall lead after the Alpe d'Huez stage. Of his battles with Indurain in those years, he was quoted as saying "If he remembers me as a rival, that's already a privilege" in the documentary Las Víctimas de Indurain (Indurain's Victims), broadcast by Movistar+.

He was a member of the Gewiss-Ballan team under team doctor Michele Ferrari that had a collective increase in their red blood cell count, or hematocrit level from December 1994, to May 1995, with his percentage being the highest and with the greatest increase, rose from 32.8% to 60% according to records published in L'Équipe from the office of Dr. Ferrari. This was two years prior to the UCI setting the permitted hematocrit level at 50%. Speaking of it, he was quoted as saying, "I passed all the controls without a problem. My conscience is clear." He had another podium finish in the overall classification at the 1995 Giro, placing third behind Tony Rominger and Evgeni Berzin. He later finished fourth at the 1996 Giro and finished in seventh place at the 1996 Tour de France.

He retired in 1999 after a decade in professional cycling.

Ugrumov coached Mexican National team from 2021, including Isaac del Toro.

== Personal life ==
Ugrjumovs was born in Riga to a Russian father and Belarusian mother, and attended Riga Secondary School No. 28. He has lived in Italy since 1989. In 1997, Ugrjumovs' old Soviet passport expired and he took up Russian citizenship, but in 2005 he was awarded Latvian citizenship under the name of Pēteris Ugrjumovs and pledged to renounce the Russian one.

== Major results ==
1982
8th Overall Tour de l'Avenir
1983
1st Stage 4a Ruban Granitier Breton
1984
1st Overall Giro Ciclistico d'Italia
1st Prologue Course de la Paix
1st Prologue Tour de l'Avenir
1986
1st Overall Troféu Joaquim Agostinho

1st Stage 1 (TTT)

10th Overall Coors Classic
1987
1st Overall Circuit Cycliste Sarthe

1st Stage 3

2nd Overall Okolo Slovenska
3rd Overall Tour de l'Avenir
1988
3rd Overall Course de la Paix
3rd Overall Giro Ciclistico d'Italia
1989
4th Coppa Bernocchi
7th Coppa Sabatini
8th Gran Premio Città di Camaiore
1990
2nd Overall Giro del Trentino
4th Firenze–Pistoia
5th Giro dell'Appennino
5th Coppa Ugo Agostoni
5th Coppa Bernocchi
6th Giro del Friuli
8th Overall Giro d'Italia
9th Trofeo Laigueglia
1991
1st Overall Vuelta a Asturias
2nd Overall Euskal Bizikleta
2nd Overall Tour of Galicia
2nd Clásica a los Puertos
3rd Overall Tour of the Basque Country
4th Subida al Naranco
5th Overall Volta a Catalunya
8th Overall Vuelta a España
8th Clásica de San Sebastián
8th Escalada a Montjuïc
1992
2nd Overall Vuelta a Aragón
2nd Overall Euskal Bizikleta
4th Klasika Primavera
5th Vuelta a La Rioja
7th Road race, UCI Road World Championships
1993
1st Overall Euskal Bizikleta
1st Giro del Friuli
2nd Overall Giro d'Italia

1st Stage 4

2nd GP Industria & Artigianato
3rd Coppa Placci
3rd Coppa Sabatini
4th Giro dell'Emilia
5th Overall Tour de Romandie
7th Giro di Lombardia
1994
2nd Overall Tour de France

1st Stages 18 & 19 (ITT)

2nd Giro di Romagna
4th Telekom Grand Prix (with Claudio Chiappucci)
10th Road race, UCI Road World Championships
1995
3rd Overall Giro d'Italia
3rd Overall Tour de Romandie
5th Firenze–Pistoia
1996
3rd Overall Rothaus Regio-Tour International
3rd Klasika Primavera
3rd Coppa Ugo Agostoni
4th Overall Giro d'Italia
5th Road race, National Road Championships (Russia)
7th Overall Tour de France
8th Overall Tour de Romandie
1997
5th Giro del Piemonte
7th Overall Tour de Pologne
1998
1st Luk-Cup Bühl
2nd Road race, National Road Championships (Russia)

=== Grand Tour general classification results timeline ===
Grand Tour	1989	1990	1991	1992	1993	1994	1995	1996	1997	1998	1999
Giro d'Italia	16	8	—	20	2	24	3	4	DNF	40	DNF
Tour de France	—	45	—	—	—	2	—	7	—	—	—
/ Vuelta a España	35	—	8	18	—	—	22	—	—	—	—

Legend
—	Did not compete
DNF	Did not finish
