= Pascal Richard =

Swiss cyclist (born 1964)

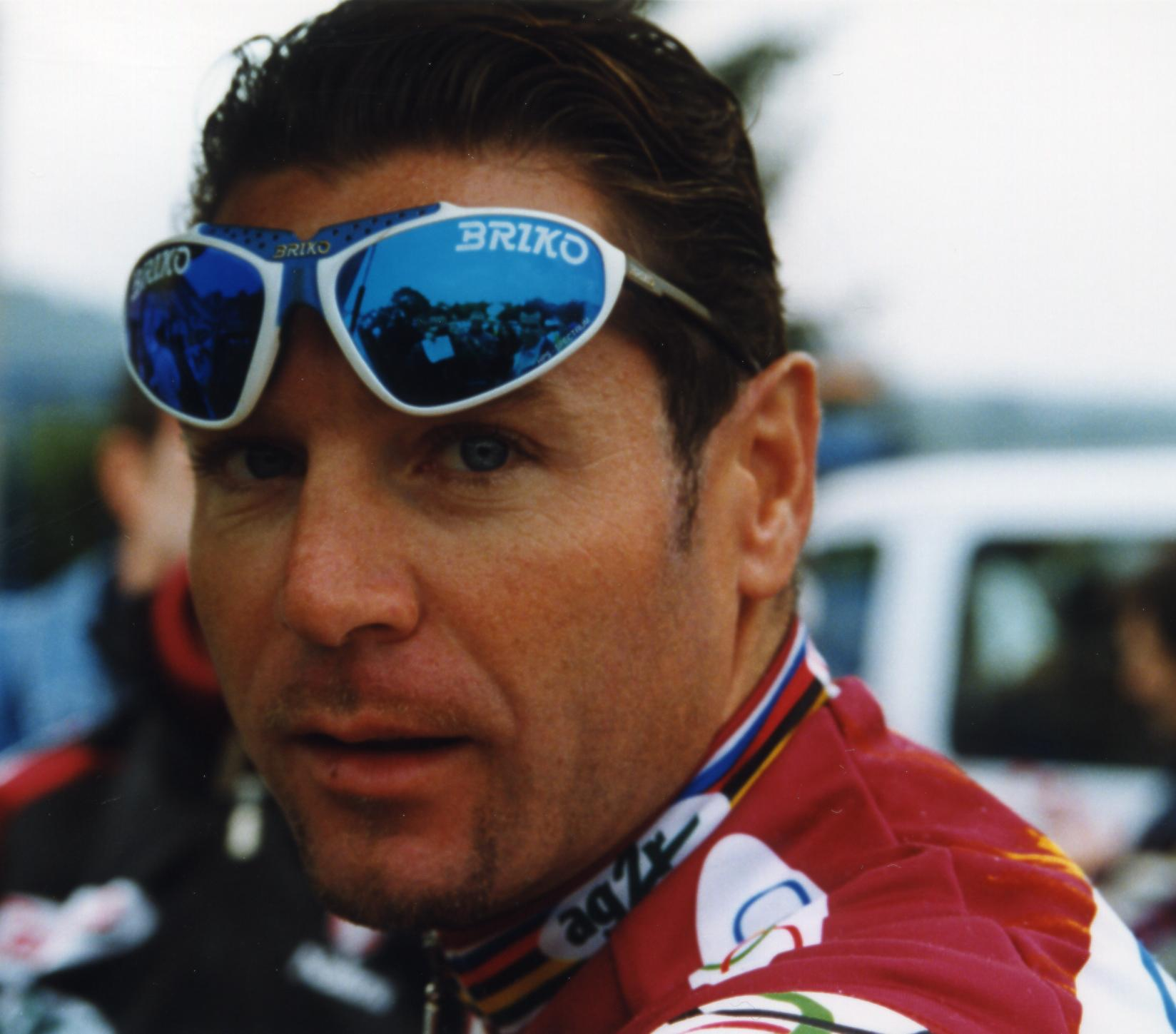
- Richard at the 1998 Paris–Tours

Personal information
- Full name: Pascal Richard
- Born: 16 March 1964 (age 62) Vevey, Switzerland

Cycling career
- Sport: Cycling
- Discipline: Cyclo-cross/Road
- Role: Rider
- Rider type: Climber

Professional teams
- 1985: Ferraroli–VCF Genève–Denti
- 1986: Kas
- 1987: Toshiba–Look
- 1988–1991: Helvetia–La Suisse
- 1992: Lotus–Festina
- 1993: Ariostea
- 1994–1996: GB-MG Maglificio
- 1997–1998: Casino
- 1999: Mobilvetta Design–Northwave
- 2000: Linda McCartney Foods

Major wins
- Grand Tours Tour de France 2 individual stages (1989, 1996) Giro d'Italia Mountains classification (1994) 4 individual stages (1994, 1995, 1996) Stage races Tour de Romandie (1993, 1994) Tour de Suisse (1994) One-day races and Classics World Cyclo-cross Championships (1988) National Road Race Championships (1993) Olympic Road Race (1996) Giro di Lombardia (1993) Liège–Bastogne–Liège (1996)
Medal record
Representing Switzerland
Men's road bicycle racing
Olympic Games
Gold medal – first place	1996 Atlanta	Road race
Men's cyclo-cross
World Championships
Gold medal – first place	1988 Hägendorf	Elite race
Silver medal – second place	1986 Lembeek	Elite race

Pascal Richard (born 16 March 1964) is a Swiss former racing cyclist. He is most notable as a former King of the Mountains winner at the Giro d'Italia and Olympic Games gold medalist. He won the Swiss National Road Race championship in 1989 and 1993.

== Biography ==
Richard was born in Vevey. At the start of his career, he was a successful cyclo-cross cyclist, becoming world champion in this discipline in 1988. Later on, he switched to road-cycling, and showed a considerable talent for climbing. He won the classics Giro di Lombardia in 1993 and Liège–Bastogne–Liège in 1996. In 1996, he also gained Olympic gold after winning a sprint in a successful three-man breakaway in the men's road race.

He won the "King of the Mountains" jersey in the 1994 Giro d'Italia and Stage 12 of the 1996 Tour de France; he captured the overall titles in the 1994 Tour de Suisse and the 1993 and 1994 Tour de Romandie.

== Major results ==
1985
1st Overall Grand Prix Guillaume Tell

1st Stage 7b

1986
1st National Cyclo-cross Championships
1st Stage 5b Vuelta a Asturias
1987
3rd Overall Grand Prix Guillaume Tell

1st Stage 1

1988
1st UCI World Cyclo-cross Championships
1989
1st Road race, National Road Championships
1st National Cyclo-cross Championships
1st Stage 16 Tour de France
6th Grand Prix des Amériques
1990
1st Tre Valli Varesine
2nd Giro di Lombardia
2nd Giro del Veneto
9th Clásica de San Sebastián
1991
1st Trofeo Laigueglia
1st Stage 2 Tirreno–Adriatico
Tour de Romandie

1st Prologue & Stage 6

2nd Overall Tour de Suisse
2nd Tre Valli Varesine
4th Overall Tour Méditerranéen La Méditerranéenne
4th Coppa Bernocchi
1993
1st Road race, National Road Championships
1st Overall Tour de Romandie

1st Stage 3

1st Giro di Lombardia
1st Giro del Lazio
1st Giro della Romagna
1st Stage 8 Tour de Suisse
2nd Giro dell'Emilia
4th Overall Tour of the Basque Country
4th Overall Settimana Internazionale di Coppi e Bartali

1st Stage 4

4th Grand Prix of Aargau Canton
5th Overall Critérium International

1st Stage 1

8th Giro del Veneto
1994
1st Overall Tour de Suisse

1st Stage 3

1st Overall Tour de Romandie

1st Stages 3 & 5 (ITT)

Giro d'Italia

1st Mountains classification
1st Stage 21

1st Grand Prix of Aargau Canton
1st Tour du Lac Léman
2nd Giro di Toscana
2nd Tour de Berne
3rd Giro di Lombardia
4th Trofeo Pantalica
5th Milano–Torino
7th Overall Paris–Nice

1st Stage 5

7th Züri-Metzgete
1995
Giro d'Italia

1st Stages 13 & 19

1st Giro del Lazio
1st Giro della Provincia di Reggio Calabria
1st Grand Prix of Aargau Canton
1st Trofeo Melinda
1st Stage 7 Paris–Nice
5th Road race, UCI Road World Championships
8th Giro di Lombardia
1996
1st Road race, Olympic Games
1st Liège–Bastogne–Liège
1st Stage 12 Tour de France
1st Stage 14 Giro d'Italia
2nd Klasika Primavera
6th Tour de Berne
1998
3rd Overall À travers Lausanne
5th Giro di Lombardia
8th Coppa Ugo Agostoni
10th Giro del Trentino

1st Stage 4

1999
1st Criterium d'Abruzzo
1st Stage 1 Tour de Suisse
5th Overall Giro della Provincia di Lucca
6th Tour de Berne
7th Coppa Sabatini
2000
4th Overall Settimana Internazionale di Coppi e Bartali

=== Grand Tour general classification results timeline ===
Grand Tour	1988	1989	1990	1991	1992	1993	1994	1995	1996	1997	1998	1999	2000
Giro d'Italia	—	—	—	—	56	—	15	13	DNF	—	DNF	55	DNF
Tour de France	DNF	23	DNF	49	DNF	—	—	—	47	—	—	—	—
Vuelta a España	—	—	—	—	DNF	—	—	—	—	34	—	—	—

Legend
—	Did not compete
DNF	Did not finish
