= List of teams and cyclists in the 1994 Tour de France =

List of cyclists

A total of 21 teams were invited to participate in the 1994 Tour de France. Fifteen teams were announced in May, based on their UCI ranking:

The Jolly-team of Zenon Jaskuła, who had finished in third place in the 1993 Tour de France, was not selected. Each team sent a squad of nine riders, so the Tour began with a peloton of 189 cyclists. Out of the 189 riders that started this edition of the Tour de France, a total of 117 riders made it to the finish in Paris.

== Teams ==
Qualified teams

- Carrera Jeans–Tassoni
- GB–MG Maglificio
- Gewiss–Ballan
- Lampre–Panaria
- Mapei–CLAS
- Mercatone Uno–Medeghini
- Team Polti–Vaporetto
- Castorama
- GAN
- Novemail–Histor–Laser Computer
- Banesto
- ONCE
- Lotto
- Motorola
- WordPerfect–Colnago–Decca

Invited teams

- Festina–Lotus
- TVM–Bison Kit
- Team Telekom
- ZG Mobili
- Kelme–Avianca–Gios
- Chazal–MBK

== Cyclists ==
=== By starting number ===
Legend
| No. | Starting number worn by the rider during the Tour |
| Pos. | Position in the general classification |
| Time | Deficit to the winner of the general classification |
| General classification | Denotes the winner of the general classification |
| Points classification | Denotes the winner of the points classification |
| Mountains classification | Denotes the winner of the mountains classification |
| Team classification | Denotes the winner of the team classification |
| Combativity award | Denotes the winner of the combativity award |
| DNF | Denotes a rider who did not finish |
| NP | Denotes a rider who was a non-participant |
| AB | Denotes a rider who abandoned |
| EL | Denotes a rider who was eliminated |
| HD | Denotes a rider who was outside the time limit (French: Hors Delai) |
Age correct as of 2 July 1994, the date on which the Tour began

| No. | Name | Nationality | Team | Age | Pos. | Time | Ref |
|---|---|---|---|---|---|---|---|
| 1 | Miguel Induráin | Spain | Banesto | 29 | 1 | 103h 38' 38" | |
| 2 | Marino Alonso | Spain | Banesto | 28 | DNF (AB-17) | — | |
| 3 | Vicente Aparicio Vila | Spain | Banesto | 24 | 67 | + 1h 59' 34" | |
| 4 | Jean-François Bernard | France | Banesto | 32 | 17 | + 36' 44" | |
| 5 | Ramón González Arrieta | Spain | Banesto | 27 | 32 | + 1h 02' 40" | |
| 6 | Melcior Mauri | Spain | Banesto | 28 | 95 | + 2h 30' 20" | |
| 7 | Erwin Nijboer | Netherlands | Banesto | 30 | 99 | + 2h 34' 27" | |
| 8 | Gérard Rué | France | Banesto | 28 | 56 | + 1h 51' 28" | |
| 9 | José Ramón Uriarte | Spain | Banesto | 27 | 49 | + 1h 44' 51" | |
| 11 | Tony Rominger | Switzerland | Mapei–CLAS | 33 | DNF (AB-13) | — | |
| 12 | Gianluca Bortolami | Italy | Mapei–CLAS | 25 | 13 | + 32' 35" | |
| 13 | Federico Echave | Spain | Mapei–CLAS | 33 | 34 | + 1h 07' 45" | |
| 14 | Nico Emonds | Belgium | Mapei–CLAS | 33 | DNF (AB-14) | — | |
| 15 | Fernando Escartín | Spain | Mapei–CLAS | 26 | 12 | + 30' 38" | |
| 16 | Arsenio González | Spain | Mapei–CLAS | 34 | 40 | + 1h 12' 41" | |
| 17 | Jörg Müller | Switzerland | Mapei–CLAS | 33 | 59 | + 1h 52' 19" | |
| 18 | Abraham Olano | Spain | Mapei–CLAS | 24 | 30 | + 1h 01' 29" | |
| 19 | Jon Unzaga | Spain | Mapei–CLAS | 31 | DNF (NP-15) | — | |
| 21 | Johan Museeuw | Belgium | GB–MG Maglificio | 28 | 80 | + 2h 17' 26" | |
| 22 | Carlo Bomans | Belgium | GB–MG Maglificio | 31 | 76 | + 2h 12' 55" | |
| 23 | Davide Cassani | Italy | GB–MG Maglificio | 33 | 108 | + 2h 41' 32" | |
| 24 | Alberto Elli | Italy | GB–MG Maglificio | 30 | 7 | + 20' 17" | |
| 25 | Rolf Järmann | Switzerland | GB–MG Maglificio | 28 | 73 | + 2h 10' 46" | |
| 26 | Wilfried Peeters | Belgium | GB–MG Maglificio | 29 | DNF (AB-16) | — | |
| 27 | Rolf Sørensen | Denmark | GB–MG Maglificio | 29 | 19 | + 42' 39" | |
| 28 | Flavio Vanzella | Italy | GB–MG Maglificio | 30 | 41 | + 1h 24' 05" | |
| 29 | Franco Vona | Italy | GB–MG Maglificio | 29 | 37 | + 1h 10' 41" | |
| 31 | Lance Armstrong | United States | Motorola | 22 | DNF (NP-15) | — | |
| 32 | Raúl Alcalá | Mexico | Motorola | 30 | 70 | + 2h 04' 41" | |
| 33 | Phil Anderson | Australia | Motorola | 36 | 69 | + 2h 01' 13" | |
| 34 | Frankie Andreu | United States | Motorola | 27 | 89 | + 2h 26' 24" | |
| 35 | Steve Bauer | Canada | Motorola | 35 | DNF (NP-5) | — | |
| 36 | Michel Dernies | Belgium | Motorola | 33 | 104 | + 2h 36' 31" | |
| 37 | Álvaro Mejía | Colombia | Motorola | 27 | 31 | + 1h 01' 43" | |
| 38 | Stephen Swart | New Zealand | Motorola | 29 | 112 | + 2h 44' 38" | |
| 39 | Sean Yates | Great Britain | Motorola | 34 | 71 | + 2h 04' 45" | |
| 41 | Bjarne Riis | Denmark | Gewiss–Ballan | 30 | 14 | + 33' 32" | |
| 42 | Vladislav Bobrik | Russia | Gewiss–Ballan | 23 | 62 | + 1h 55' 12" | |
| 43 | Guido Bontempi | Italy | Gewiss–Ballan | 34 | 90 | + 2h 26' 27" | |
| 44 | Dario Bottaro | Italy | Gewiss–Ballan | 27 | 107 | + 2h 39' 17" | |
| 45 | Bruno Cenghialta | Italy | Gewiss–Ballan | 31 | 25 | + 51' 30" | |
| 46 | Giorgio Furlan | Italy | Gewiss–Ballan | 28 | 58 | + 1h 52' 18" | |
| 47 | Nicola Minali | Italy | Gewiss–Ballan | 24 | DNF (AB-12) | — | |
| 48 | Piotr Ugrumov | Latvia | Gewiss–Ballan | 33 | 2 | + 5' 39" | |
| 49 | Enrico Zaina | Italy | Gewiss–Ballan | 26 | 39 | + 1h 12' 16" | |
| 51 | Claudio Chiappucci | Italy | Carrera Jeans–Tassoni | 31 | DNF (NP-12) | — | |
| 52 | Marco Artunghi | Italy | Carrera Jeans–Tassoni | 24 | DNF (AB-14) | — | |
| 53 | Alessandro Bertolini | Italy | Carrera Jeans–Tassoni | 22 | DNF (AB-12) | — | |
| 54 | Mario Chiesa | Italy | Carrera Jeans–Tassoni | 27 | 114 | + 2h 52' 02" | |
| 55 | Mario Mantovan | Italy | Carrera Jeans–Tassoni | 29 | DNF (AB-18) | — | |
| 56 | Marco Pantani | Italy | Carrera Jeans–Tassoni | 24 | 3 | + 7' 19" | |
| 57 | Vladimir Poulnikov | Ukraine | Carrera Jeans–Tassoni | 29 | 10 | + 25' 28" | |
| 58 | Remo Rossi | Italy | Carrera Jeans–Tassoni | 26 | 111 | + 2h 43' 51" | |
| 59 | Beat Zberg | Switzerland | Carrera Jeans–Tassoni | 23 | 27 | + 57' 06" | |
| 61 | Alex Zülle | Switzerland | ONCE | 25 | 8 | + 20' 35" | |
| 62 | Erik Breukink | Netherlands | ONCE | 30 | 29 | + 59' 55" | |
| 63 | Herminio Díaz Zabala | Spain | ONCE | 29 | 109 | + 2h 42' 06" | |
| 64 | Laurent Dufaux | Switzerland | ONCE | 25 | 35 | + 1h 09' 30" | |
| 65 | Laurent Jalabert | France | ONCE | 25 | DNF (NP-2) | — | |
| 66 | Alberto Leanizbarrutia | Spain | ONCE | 31 | 102 | + 2h 36' 05" | |
| 67 | Oliverio Rincón | Colombia | ONCE | 26 | DNF (AB-16) | — | |
| 68 | José Roberto Sierra | Spain | ONCE | 27 | DNF (NP-14) | — | |
| 69 | Neil Stephens | Australia | ONCE | 30 | 52 | + 1h 47' 59" | |
| 71 | Pavel Tonkov | Russia | Lampre–Panaria | 25 | DNF (AB-14) | — | |
| 72 | Roberto Conti | Italy | Lampre–Panaria | 29 | 6 | + 12' 29" | |
| 73 | Gianni Faresin | Italy | Lampre–Panaria | 28 | DNF (NP-12) | — | |
| 74 | Alessio Galletti | Italy | Lampre–Panaria | 26 | DNF (AB-16) | — | |
| 75 | Alexander Gontchenkov | Ukraine | Lampre–Panaria | 24 | DNF (NP-2) | — | |
| 76 | Marco Lietti | Italy | Lampre–Panaria | 29 | DNF (AB-14) | — | |
| 77 | Marco Serpellini | Italy | Lampre–Panaria | 21 | DNF (AB-16) | — | |
| 78 | Ján Svorada | Slovakia | Lampre–Panaria | 25 | 103 | + 2h 36' 25" | |
| 79 | Marco Zen | Italy | Lampre–Panaria | 31 | 86 | + 2h 25' 13" | |
| 81 | Jean-Philippe Dojwa | France | GAN | 26 | DNF (AB-13) | — | |
| 82 | Chris Boardman | Great Britain | GAN | 25 | DNF (AB-11) | — | |
| 83 | Christophe Capelle | France | GAN | 26 | DNF (AB-14) | — | |
| 84 | Jean-Claude Colotti | France | GAN | 27 | DNF (AB-15) | — | |
| 85 | Thierry Gouvenou | France | GAN | 25 | 78 | + 2h 15' 23" | |
| 86 | Greg LeMond | United States | GAN | 33 | DNF (AB-6) | — | |
| 87 | Francis Moreau | France | GAN | 28 | 113 | + 2h 51' 13" | |
| 88 | Didier Rous | France | GAN | 23 | DNF (AB-7) | — | |
| 89 | Eddy Seigneur | France | GAN | 25 | 51 | + 1h 47' 15" | |
| 91 | Luc Leblanc | France | Festina–Lotus | 27 | 4 | + 10' 03" | |
| 92 | Jean-Claude Bagot | France | Festina–Lotus | 36 | 47 | + 1h 44' 06" | |
| 93 | Pascal Hervé | France | Festina–Lotus | 29 | 33 | + 1h 07' 16" | |
| 94 | Stephen Hodge | Australia | Festina–Lotus | 32 | 83 | + 2h 23' 50" | |
| 95 | Pascal Lino | France | Festina–Lotus | 27 | 11 | + 26' 01" | |
| 96 | Roberto Torres | Spain | Festina–Lotus | 29 | DNF (AB-18) | — | |
| 97 | Jean-Paul van Poppel | Netherlands | Festina–Lotus | 31 | DNF (AB-17) | — | |
| 98 | Michel Vermote | Belgium | Festina–Lotus | 31 | DNF (AB-18) | — | |
| 99 | Richard Virenque | France | Festina–Lotus | 24 | 5 | + 10' 10" | |
| 101 | Gianni Bugno | Italy | Team Polti–Vaporetto | 30 | DNF (NP-14) | — | |
| 102 | Djamolidine Abdoujaparov | Uzbekistan | Team Polti–Vaporetto | 30 | 57 | + 1h 51' 34" | |
| 103 | Giovanni Fidanza | Italy | Team Polti–Vaporetto | 28 | 110 | + 2h 42' 47" | |
| 104 | Gianvito Martinelli | Italy | Team Polti–Vaporetto | 25 | DNF (HD-8) | — | |
| 105 | Serguei Outschakov | Russia | Team Polti–Vaporetto | 26 | 63 | + 1h 57' 31" | |
| 106 | Oscar Pelliccioli | Italy | Team Polti–Vaporetto | 29 | 15 | + 34' 55" | |
| 107 | Andrea Peron | Italy | Team Polti–Vaporetto | 22 | 61 | + 1h 53' 47" | |
| 108 | Mario Scirea | Italy | Team Polti–Vaporetto | 29 | DNF (AB-14) | — | |
| 109 | Dimitri Zhdanov | Russia | Team Polti–Vaporetto | 24 | 72 | + 2h 08' 20" | |
| 111 | Armand de Las Cuevas | France | Castorama | 26 | DNF (NP-18) | — | |
| 112 | Thomas Davy | France | Castorama | 26 | 21 | + 46' 41" | |
| 113 | Laurent Desbiens | France | Castorama | 24 | DNF (AB-16) | — | |
| 114 | Jacky Durand | France | Castorama | 27 | DNF (AB-14) | — | |
| 115 | Laurent Madouas | France | Castorama | 27 | DNF (AB-14) | — | |
| 116 | Emmanuel Magnien | France | Castorama | 23 | DNF (AB-16) | — | |
| 117 | Thierry Marie | France | Castorama | 31 | 53 | + 1h 48' 47" | |
| 118 | François Simon | France | Castorama | 25 | 43 | + 1h 30' 50" | |
| 119 | Bruno Thibout | France | Castorama | 25 | 91 | + 2h 26' 42" | |
| 121 | Steven Rooks | Netherlands | TVM–Bison Kit | 33 | DNF (AB-12) | — | |
| 122 | Johan Capiot | Belgium | TVM–Bison Kit | 30 | DNF (NP-15) | — | |
| 123 | Dag Otto Lauritzen | Norway | TVM–Bison Kit | 37 | 50 | + 1h 45' 54" | |
| 124 | Bo Hamburger | Denmark | TVM–Bison Kit | 24 | 20 | + 43' 44" | |
| 125 | Rob Harmeling | Netherlands | TVM–Bison Kit | 29 | DNF (EL-14) | — | |
| 126 | Peter Meinert Nielsen | Denmark | TVM–Bison Kit | 28 | DNF (AB-12) | — | |
| 127 | Jesper Skibby | Denmark | TVM–Bison Kit | 30 | 45 | + 1h 41' 21" | |
| 128 | Gert-Jan Theunisse | Netherlands | TVM–Bison Kit | 31 | DNF (AB-12) | — | |
| 129 | Bart Voskamp | Netherlands | TVM–Bison Kit | 26 | DNF (AB-14) | — | |
| 131 | Olaf Ludwig | Germany | Team Telekom | 34 | 105 | + 2h 37' 37" | |
| 132 | Rolf Aldag | Germany | Team Telekom | 25 | 38 | + 1h 10' 59" | |
| 133 | Gerd Audehm | Germany | Team Telekom | 25 | 28 | + 57' 44" | |
| 134 | Udo Bölts | Germany | Team Telekom | 27 | 9 | + 25' 19" | |
| 135 | Christian Henn | Germany | Team Telekom | 30 | 106 | + 2h 37' 48" | |
| 136 | Jens Heppner | Germany | Team Telekom | 29 | 60 | + 1h 53' 46" | |
| 137 | Mario Kummer | Germany | Team Telekom | 32 | 97 | + 2h 31' 42" | |
| 138 | Uwe Raab | Germany | Team Telekom | 31 | 84 | + 2h 24' 38" | |
| 139 | Erik Zabel | Germany | Team Telekom | 23 | DNF (AB-14) | — | |
| 141 | Massimo Ghirotto | Italy | ZG Mobili–Selle Italia | 33 | 75 | + 2h 12' 49" | |
| 142 | Fabio Casartelli | Italy | ZG Mobili–Selle Italia | 23 | DNF (AB-7) | — | |
| 143 | Stefano Colagè | Italy | ZG Mobili–Selle Italia | 31 | DNF (NP-12) | — | |
| 144 | Fabiano Fontanelli | Italy | ZG Mobili–Selle Italia | 29 | DNF (NP-7) | — | |
| 145 | Giancarlo Perini | Italy | ZG Mobili–Selle Italia | 34 | 54 | + 1h 50' 07" | |
| 146 | Davide Perona | Italy | ZG Mobili–Selle Italia | 26 | 46 | + 1h 43' 05" | |
| 147 | Hendrik Redant | Belgium | ZG Mobili–Selle Italia | 31 | 93 | + 2h 28' 57" | |
| 148 | Nelson Rodríguez Serna | Colombia | ZG Mobili–Selle Italia | 28 | 16 | + 35' 18" | |
| 149 | Mauro-Antonio Santaromita | Italy | ZG Mobili–Selle Italia | 29 | 65 | + 1h 58' 09" | |
| 151 | Viatcheslav Ekimov | Russia | WordPerfect–Colnago–Decca | 28 | 36 | + 1h 09' 50" | |
| 152 | Erik Dekker | Netherlands | WordPerfect–Colnago–Decca | 23 | 101 | + 2h 34' 52" | |
| 153 | Atle Kvålsvoll | Norway | WordPerfect–Colnago–Decca | 32 | 79 | + 2h 15' 23" | |
| 154 | Frans Maassen | Netherlands | WordPerfect–Colnago–Decca | 29 | DNF (AB-7) | — | |
| 155 | Léon van Bon | Netherlands | WordPerfect–Colnago–Decca | 22 | DNF (NP-12) | — | |
| 156 | Rob Mulders | Netherlands | WordPerfect–Colnago–Decca | 27 | 116 | + 3h 08' 32" | |
| 157 | Edwig Van Hooydonck | Belgium | WordPerfect–Colnago–Decca | 27 | DNF (NP-14) | — | |
| 158 | Eric Van Lancker | Belgium | WordPerfect–Colnago–Decca | 33 | DNF (AB-18) | — | |
| 159 | Marc Wauters | Belgium | WordPerfect–Colnago–Decca | 25 | 92 | + 2h 28' 38" | |
| 161 | Charly Mottet | France | Novemail–Laser Computer | 31 | 26 | + 51' 44" | |
| 162 | Bruno Cornillet | France | Novemail–Laser Computer | 31 | DNF (AB-3) | — | |
| 163 | Gerrit de Vries | Netherlands | Novemail–Laser Computer | 27 | 77 | + 2h 14' 53" | |
| 164 | Patrick Jonker | Netherlands | Novemail–Laser Computer | 25 | DNF (AB-14) | — | |
| 165 | Philippe Louviot | France | Novemail–Laser Computer | 30 | 74 | + 2h 12' 10" | |
| 166 | Wilfried Nelissen | Belgium | Novemail–Laser Computer | 24 | DNF (NP-2) | — | |
| 167 | Guy Nulens | Belgium | Novemail–Laser Computer | 36 | 88 | + 2h 25' 52" | |
| 168 | Ronan Pensec | France | Novemail–Laser Computer | 30 | 66 | + 1h 59' 02" | |
| 169 | Marc Sergeant | Belgium | Novemail–Laser Computer | 34 | DNF (AB-20) | — | |
| 171 | Laudelino Cubino | Spain | Kelme–Avianca–Gios | 31 | DNF (AB-16) | — | |
| 172 | Hernán Buenahora | Colombia | Kelme–Avianca–Gios | 27 | 18 | + 38' 00" | |
| 173 | Francisco Cabello | Spain | Kelme–Avianca–Gios | 25 | 87 | + 2h 25' 35" | |
| 174 | Julio César Cadena | Colombia | Kelme–Avianca–Gios | 30 | 85 | + 2h 24' 52" | |
| 175 | Ángel Camargo | Colombia | Kelme–Avianca–Gios | 27 | 55 | + 1h 50' 08" | |
| 176 | Ángel Edo | Spain | Kelme–Avianca–Gios | 23 | 96 | + 2h 31' 01" | |
| 177 | Ignacio García Camacho | Spain | Kelme–Avianca–Gios | 25 | DNF (AB-14) | — | |
| 178 | Federico Muñoz | Colombia | Kelme–Avianca–Gios | 31 | 23 | + 48' 33" | |
| 179 | Cezary Zamana | Poland | Kelme–Avianca–Gios | 26 | 100 | + 2h 34' 43" | |
| 181 | Éric Caritoux | France | Chazal–MBK | 33 | 22 | + 47' 19" | |
| 182 | Miguel Arroyo | Mexico | Chazal–MBK | 27 | 48 | + 1h 44' 11" | |
| 183 | Jean-Pierre Bourgeot | France | Chazal–MBK | 25 | DNF (AB-14) | — | |
| 184 | Pascal Chanteur | France | Chazal–MBK | 26 | 81 | + 2h 17' 36" | |
| 185 | Gérard Guazzini | France | Chazal–MBK | 27 | DNF (HD-9) | — | |
| 186 | Artūras Kasputis | Lithuania | Chazal–MBK | 27 | 44 | + 1h 37' 46" | |
| 187 | Jaan Kirsipuu | Estonia | Chazal–MBK | 24 | DNF (AB-12) | — | |
| 188 | Christophe Manin | France | Chazal–MBK | 27 | 64 | + 1h 58' 02" | |
| 189 | Marco Vermey | Netherlands | Chazal–MBK | 29 | DNF (AB-14) | — | |
| 191 | Andrei Tchmil | Russia | Lotto | 31 | DNF (NP-20) | — | |
| 192 | Mario De Clercq | Belgium | Lotto | 28 | DNF (AB-18) | — | |
| 193 | Peter De Clercq | Belgium | Lotto | 28 | 82 | + 2h 21' 43" | |
| 194 | Peter Farazijn | Belgium | Lotto | 25 | DNF (AB-14) | — | |
| 195 | Herman Frison | Belgium | Lotto | 33 | DNF (AB-15) | — | |
| 196 | Wanderley Magalhães Azevedo | Brazil | Lotto | 27 | DNF (NP-5) | — | |
| 197 | Luc Roosen | Belgium | Lotto | 29 | 68 | + 2h 00' 43" | |
| 198 | Jim Van De Laer | Belgium | Lotto | 26 | 24 | + 48' 35" | |
| 199 | Rudy Verdonck | Belgium | Lotto | 28 | 98 | + 2h 32' 24" | |
| 201 | Franco Chioccioli | Italy | Mercatone Uno–Medeghini | 34 | 42 | + 1h 26' 52" | |
| 202 | Adriano Baffi | Italy | Mercatone Uno–Medeghini | 31 | DNF (AB-5) | — | |
| 203 | Rosario Fina | Italy | Mercatone Uno–Medeghini | 25 | DNF (AB-18) | — | |
| 204 | Paolo Lanfranchi | Italy | Mercatone Uno–Medeghini | 25 | DNF (AB-12) | — | |
| 205 | Silvio Martinello | Italy | Mercatone Uno–Medeghini | 31 | 94 | + 2h 29' 04" | |
| 206 | Giuseppe Petito | Italy | Mercatone Uno–Medeghini | 34 | DNF (AB-12) | — | |
| 207 | Roberto Petito | Italy | Mercatone Uno–Medeghini | 23 | DNF (AB-11) | — | |
| 208 | Eros Poli | Italy | Mercatone Uno–Medeghini | 30 | 115 | + 2h 52' 41" | |
| 209 | John Talen | Netherlands | Mercatone Uno–Medeghini | 29 | 117 | + 3h 39' 03" | |

=== By team ===
Banesto
| No. | Rider | Pos. |
|---|---|---|
| 1 | Miguel Induráin (ESP) | 1 |
| 2 | Marino Alonso (ESP) | AB-17 |
| 3 | Vicente Aparicio Vila (ESP) | 67 |
| 4 | Jean-François Bernard (FRA) | 17 |
| 5 | Ramón González Arrieta (ESP) | 32 |
| 6 | Melcior Mauri (ESP) | 95 |
| 7 | Erwin Nijboer (NED) | 99 |
| 8 | Gérard Rué (FRA) | 56 |
| 9 | José Ramón Uriarte (ESP) | 49 |
Directeur sportif: José Miguel Echavarri

Mapei–CLAS
| No. | Rider | Pos. |
|---|---|---|
| 11 | Tony Rominger (SUI) | AB-13 |
| 12 | Gianluca Bortolami (ITA) | 13 |
| 13 | Federico Echave (ESP) | 34 |
| 14 | Nico Emonds (BEL) | AB-14 |
| 15 | Fernando Escartín (ESP) | 12 |
| 16 | Arsenio González (ESP) | 40 |
| 17 | Jörg Müller (SUI) | 59 |
| 18 | Abraham Olano (ESP) | 30 |
| 19 | Jon Unzaga (ESP) | NP-15 |
Directeur sportif: Fabrizio Fabbri

GB–MG Maglificio
| No. | Rider | Pos. |
|---|---|---|
| 21 | Johan Museeuw (BEL) | 80 |
| 22 | Carlo Bomans (BEL) | 76 |
| 23 | Davide Cassani (ITA) | 108 |
| 24 | Alberto Elli (ITA) | 7 |
| 25 | Rolf Järmann (SUI) | 73 |
| 26 | Wilfried Peeters (BEL) | AB-16 |
| 27 | Rolf Sørensen (DEN) | 19 |
| 28 | Flavio Vanzella (ITA) | 41 |
| 29 | Franco Vona (ITA) | 37 |
Directeur sportif: Giancarlo Ferretti

Motorola
| No. | Rider | Pos. |
|---|---|---|
| 31 | Lance Armstrong (USA) | NP-15 |
| 32 | Raúl Alcalá (MEX) | 70 |
| 33 | Phil Anderson (AUS) | 69 |
| 34 | Frankie Andreu (USA) | 89 |
| 35 | Steve Bauer (CAN) | NP-5 |
| 36 | Michel Dernies (BEL) | 104 |
| 37 | Álvaro Mejía (COL) | 31 |
| 38 | Stephen Swart (NZL) | 112 |
| 39 | Sean Yates (GBR) | 71 |
Directeur sportif: Hennie Kuiper

Gewiss–Ballan
| No. | Rider | Pos. |
|---|---|---|
| 41 | Bjarne Riis (DEN) | 14 |
| 42 | Vladislav Bobrik (RUS) | 62 |
| 43 | Guido Bontempi (ITA) | 90 |
| 44 | Dario Bottaro (ITA) | 107 |
| 45 | Bruno Cenghialta (ITA) | 25 |
| 46 | Giorgio Furlan (ITA) | 58 |
| 47 | Nicola Minali (ITA) | AB-12 |
| 48 | Piotr Ugrumov (LAT) | 2 |
| 49 | Enrico Zaina (ITA) | 39 |
Directeur sportif: Emanuele Bombini

Carrera Jeans–Tassoni
| No. | Rider | Pos. |
|---|---|---|
| 51 | Claudio Chiappucci (ITA) | NP-12 |
| 52 | Marco Artunghi (ITA) | AB-14 |
| 53 | Alessandro Bertolini (ITA) | AB-12 |
| 54 | Mario Chiesa (ITA) | 114 |
| 55 | Mario Mantovan (ITA) | AB-18 |
| 56 | Marco Pantani (ITA) | 3 |
| 57 | Vladimir Poulnikov (UKR) | 10 |
| 58 | Remo Rossi (ITA) | 111 |
| 59 | Beat Zberg (SUI) | 27 |
Directeur sportif: Giuseppe Martinelli

ONCE
| No. | Rider | Pos. |
|---|---|---|
| 61 | Alex Zülle (SUI) | 8 |
| 62 | Erik Breukink (NED) | 29 |
| 63 | Herminio Díaz Zabala (ESP) | 109 |
| 64 | Laurent Dufaux (SUI) | 35 |
| 65 | Laurent Jalabert (FRA) | NP-2 |
| 66 | Alberto Leanizbarrutia (ESP) | 102 |
| 67 | Oliverio Rincón (COL) | AB-16 |
| 68 | José Roberto Sierra (ESP) | NP-14 |
| 69 | Neil Stephens (AUS) | 52 |
Directeur sportif: Manuel Saiz

Lampre–Panaria
| No. | Rider | Pos. |
|---|---|---|
| 71 | Pavel Tonkov (RUS) | AB-14 |
| 72 | Roberto Conti (ITA) | 6 |
| 73 | Gianni Faresin (ITA) | NP-12 |
| 74 | Alessio Galletti (ITA) | AB-16 |
| 75 | Alexander Gontchenkov (UKR) | NP-2 |
| 76 | Marco Lietti (ITA) | AB-14 |
| 77 | Marco Serpellini (ITA) | AB-16 |
| 78 | Ján Svorada (SVK) | 103 |
| 79 | Marco Zen (ITA) | 86 |
Directeur sportif: Pietro Algeri

GAN
| No. | Rider | Pos. |
|---|---|---|
| 81 | Jean-Philippe Dojwa (FRA) | AB-13 |
| 82 | Chris Boardman (GBR) | AB-11 |
| 83 | Christophe Capelle (FRA) | AB-14 |
| 84 | Jean-Claude Colotti (FRA) | AB-15 |
| 85 | Thierry Gouvenou (FRA) | 78 |
| 86 | Greg LeMond (USA) | AB-6 |
| 87 | Francis Moreau (FRA) | 113 |
| 88 | Didier Rous (FRA) | AB-7 |
| 89 | Eddy Seigneur (FRA) | 51 |
Directeur sportif: Roger Legeay

Festina–Lotus
| No. | Rider | Pos. |
|---|---|---|
| 91 | Luc Leblanc (FRA) | 4 |
| 92 | Jean-Claude Bagot (FRA) | 47 |
| 93 | Pascal Hervé (FRA) | 33 |
| 94 | Stephen Hodge (AUS) | 83 |
| 95 | Pascal Lino (FRA) | 11 |
| 96 | Roberto Torres (ESP) | AB-18 |
| 97 | Jean-Paul van Poppel (NED) | AB-17 |
| 98 | Michel Vermote (BEL) | AB-18 |
| 99 | Richard Virenque (FRA) | 5 |
Directeur sportif: Bruno Roussel

Team Polti–Vaporetto
| No. | Rider | Pos. |
|---|---|---|
| 101 | Gianni Bugno (ITA) | NP-14 |
| 102 | Djamolidine Abdoujaparov (UZB) | 57 |
| 103 | Giovanni Fidanza (ITA) | 110 |
| 104 | Gianvito Martinelli (ITA) | HD-8 |
| 105 | Serguei Outschakov (UKR) | 63 |
| 106 | Oscar Pelliccioli (ITA) | 15 |
| 107 | Andrea Peron (ITA) | 61 |
| 108 | Mario Scirea (ITA) | AB-14 |
| 109 | Dimitri Zhdanov (RUS) | 72 |
Directeur sportif: Vittorio Algeri

Castorama
| No. | Rider | Pos. |
|---|---|---|
| 111 | Armand de Las Cuevas (FRA) | NP-18 |
| 112 | Thomas Davy (FRA) | 21 |
| 113 | Laurent Desbiens (FRA) | AB-16 |
| 114 | Jacky Durand (FRA) | AB-14 |
| 115 | Laurent Madouas (FRA) | AB-14 |
| 116 | Emmanuel Magnien (FRA) | AB-16 |
| 117 | Thierry Marie (FRA) | 53 |
| 118 | François Simon (FRA) | 43 |
| 119 | Bruno Thibout (FRA) | 91 |
Directeur sportif: Bernard Quilfen

TVM–Bison Kit
| No. | Rider | Pos. |
|---|---|---|
| 121 | Steven Rooks (NED) | AB-12 |
| 122 | Johan Capiot (BEL) | NP-15 |
| 123 | Dag Otto Lauritzen (NOR) | 50 |
| 124 | Bo Hamburger (DEN) | 20 |
| 125 | Rob Harmeling (NED) | EL-14 |
| 126 | Peter Meinert Nielsen (DEN) | AB-12 |
| 127 | Jesper Skibby (DEN) | 45 |
| 128 | Gert-Jan Theunisse (NED) | AB-12 |
| 129 | Bart Voskamp (NED) | AB-14 |
Directeur sportif: Cees Priem

Team Telekom
| No. | Rider | Pos. |
|---|---|---|
| 131 | Olaf Ludwig (GER) | 105 |
| 132 | Rolf Aldag (GER) | 38 |
| 133 | Gerd Audehm (GER) | 28 |
| 134 | Udo Bölts (GER) | 9 |
| 135 | Christian Henn (GER) | 106 |
| 136 | Jens Heppner (GER) | 60 |
| 137 | Mario Kummer (GER) | 97 |
| 138 | Uwe Raab (GER) | 84 |
| 139 | Erik Zabel (GER) | AB-14 |
Directeur sportif: Walter Godefroot

ZG Mobili–Selle Italia
| No. | Rider | Pos. |
|---|---|---|
| 141 | Massimo Ghirotto (ITA) | 75 |
| 142 | Fabio Casartelli (ITA) | AB-7 |
| 143 | Stefano Colagè (ITA) | NP-12 |
| 144 | Fabiano Fontanelli (ITA) | NP-7 |
| 145 | Giancarlo Perini (ITA) | 54 |
| 146 | Davide Perona (ITA) | 46 |
| 147 | Hendrik Redant (BEL) | 93 |
| 148 | Nelson Rodríguez Serna (COL) | 16 |
| 149 | Mauro-Antonio Santaromita (ITA) | 65 |
Directeur sportif: Domenico Cavallo

WordPerfect–Colnago–Decca
| No. | Rider | Pos. |
|---|---|---|
| 151 | Viatcheslav Ekimov (RUS) | 36 |
| 152 | Erik Dekker (NED) | 101 |
| 153 | Atle Kvålsvoll (NOR) | 79 |
| 154 | Frans Maassen (NED) | AB-7 |
| 155 | Léon van Bon (NED) | NP-12 |
| 156 | Rob Mulders (NED) | 116 |
| 157 | Edwig Van Hooydonck (BEL) | NP-14 |
| 158 | Eric Van Lancker (BEL) | AB-18 |
| 159 | Marc Wauters (BEL) | 92 |
Directeur sportif: Jan Raas

Novemail–Laser Computer
| No. | Rider | Pos. |
|---|---|---|
| 161 | Charly Mottet (FRA) | 26 |
| 162 | Bruno Cornillet (FRA) | AB-3 |
| 163 | Gerrit de Vries (NED) | 77 |
| 164 | Patrick Jonker (NED) | AB-14 |
| 165 | Philippe Louviot (FRA) | 74 |
| 166 | Wilfried Nelissen (BEL) | NP-2 |
| 167 | Guy Nulens (BEL) | 88 |
| 168 | Ronan Pensec (FRA) | 66 |
| 169 | Marc Sergeant (BEL) | AB-20 |
Directeur sportif: Peter Post

Kelme–Avianca–Gios
| No. | Rider | Pos. |
|---|---|---|
| 171 | Laudelino Cubino (ESP) | AB-16 |
| 172 | Hernán Buenahora (COL) | 18 |
| 173 | Francisco Cabello (ESP) | 87 |
| 174 | Julio César Cadena (COL) | 85 |
| 175 | Ángel Camargo (COL) | 55 |
| 176 | Ángel Edo (ESP) | 96 |
| 177 | Ignacio García Camacho (ESP) | AB-14 |
| 178 | Federico Muñoz (COL) | 23 |
| 179 | Cezary Zamana (POL) | 100 |
Directeur sportif: Álvaro Pino

Chazal–MBK
| No. | Rider | Pos. |
|---|---|---|
| 181 | Éric Caritoux (FRA) | 22 |
| 182 | Miguel Arroyo (MEX) | 48 |
| 183 | Jean-Pierre Bourgeot (FRA) | AB-14 |
| 184 | Pascal Chanteur (FRA) | 81 |
| 185 | Gérard Guazzini (FRA) | HD-9 |
| 186 | Artūras Kasputis (LTU) | 44 |
| 187 | Jaan Kirsipuu (EST) | AB-12 |
| 188 | Christophe Manin (FRA) | 64 |
| 189 | Marco Vermey (NED) | AB-14 |
Directeur sportif: Vincent Lavenu

Lotto
| No. | Rider | Pos. |
|---|---|---|
| 191 | Andrei Tchmil (RUS) | NP-20 |
| 192 | Mario De Clercq (BEL) | AB-18 |
| 193 | Peter De Clercq (BEL) | 82 |
| 194 | Peter Farazijn (BEL) | AB-14 |
| 195 | Herman Frison (BEL) | AB-15 |
| 196 | Wanderley Magalhães Azevedo (BRA) | NP-5 |
| 197 | Luc Roosen (BEL) | 68 |
| 198 | Jim Van De Laer (BEL) | 24 |
| 199 | Rudy Verdonck (BEL) | 98 |
Directeur sportif: Jean-Luc Vandenbroucke

Mercatone Uno–Medeghini
| No. | Rider | Pos. |
|---|---|---|
| 201 | Franco Chioccioli (ITA) | 42 |
| 202 | Adriano Baffi (ITA) | AB-5 |
| 203 | Rosario Fina (ITA) | AB-18 |
| 204 | Paolo Lanfranchi (ITA) | AB-12 |
| 205 | Silvio Martinello (ITA) | 94 |
| 206 | Giuseppe Petito (ITA) | AB-12 |
| 207 | Roberto Petito (ITA) | AB-11 |
| 208 | Eros Poli (ITA) | 115 |
| 209 | John Talen (NED) | 117 |
Directeur sportif: Antonio Salutini

=== By nationality ===
The 189 riders that competed in the 1994 Tour de France represented 25 countries. Riders from ten countries won stages during the race; French and Italian riders won the largest number of stages.

| Country | No. of riders | Finishers | Stage wins |
|---|---|---|---|
| Australia | 3 | 3 | |
| Belgium | 21 | 10 | |
| Brazil | 1 | 0 | |
| Canada | 1 | 0 | |
| Colombia | 7 | 6 | 1 (Nelson Rodríguez) |
| Denmark | 5 | 4 | 3 (Bo Hamburger, Bjarne Riis, Rolf Sørensen) |
| Estonia | 1 | 0 | |
| France | 33 | 20 | 4 (Jacky Durand, Luc Leblanc, Richard Virenque, Eddy Seigneur) |
| Germany | 9 | 8 | |
| Italy | 45 | 25 | 4 (Nicola Minali, Gianluca Bortolami, Eros Poli, Roberto Conti) |
| Latvia | 1 | 1 | 2 (Piotr Ugrumov ×2) |
| Lithuania | 1 | 1 | |
| Mexico | 2 | 2 | |
| Netherlands | 15 | 6 | 1 (Jean-Paul van Poppel) |
| New Zealand | 1 | 1 | |
| Norway | 2 | 2 | |
| Poland | 1 | 1 | |
| Russia | 6 | 4 | |
| Slovakia | 1 | 1 | 1 (Ján Svorada) |
| Spain | 19 | 13 | 2 (Francisco Cabello, Miguel Induráin) |
| Switzerland | 6 | 5 | |
| Ukraine | 2 | 1 | |
| Great Britain | 2 | 1 | 1 (Chris Boardman) |
| United States | 3 | 1 | |
| Uzbekistan | 1 | 1 | 2 (Djamolidine Abdoujaparov ×2) |
| Total | 189 | 117 | 21 (Note: The team time trial on stage 3, won by GB–MG Maglificio, is not counted in this total.) |
