= 1994 Tour de France, Stage 11 to Stage 21 =

Stages of cycle race

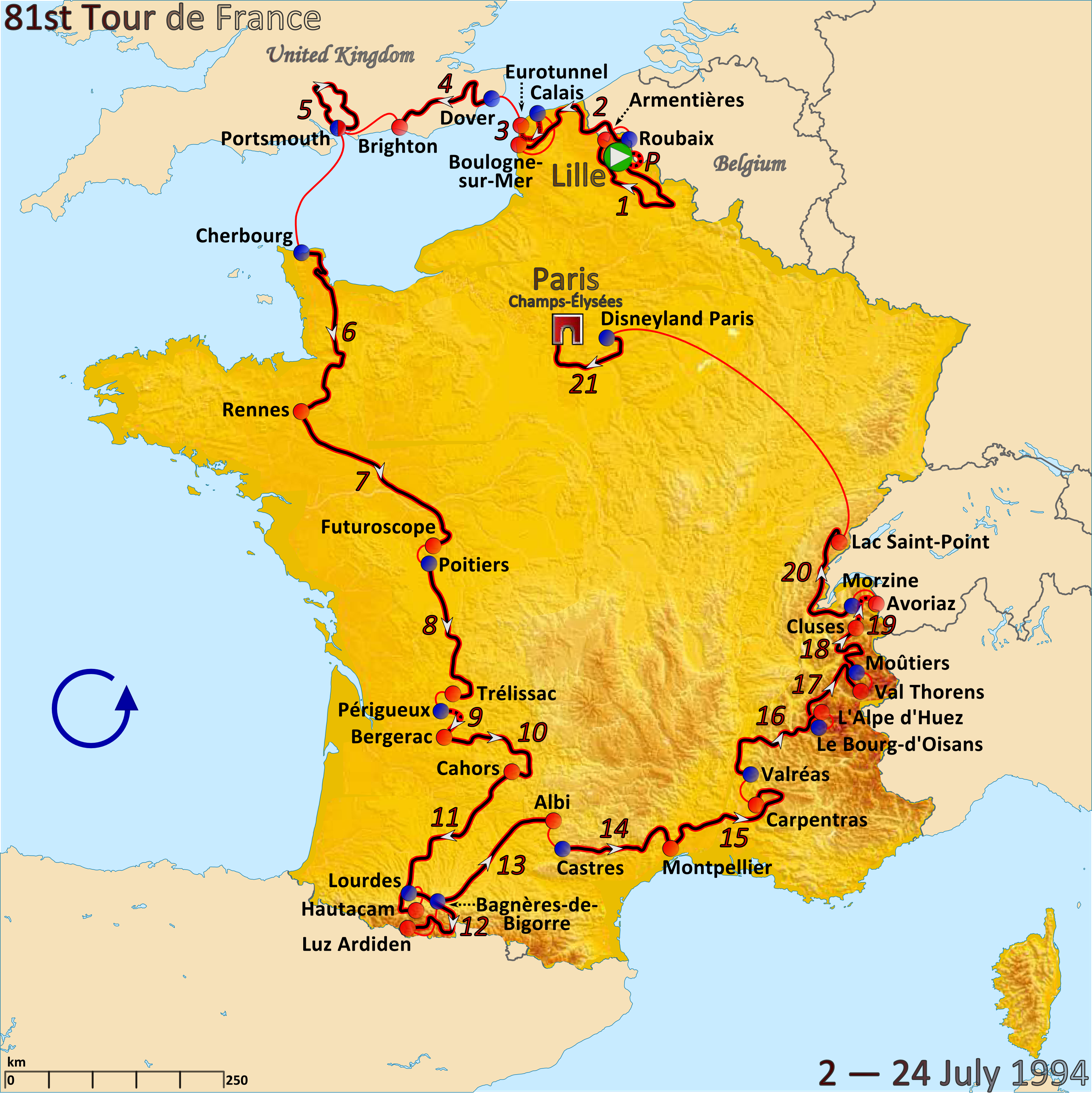
Route of the 1994 Tour de France

The 1994 Tour de France was the 81st edition of Tour de France, one of cycling's Grand Tours. The Tour began in Lille with a prologue individual time trial on 2 July and Stage 11 occurred on 13 July with a mountainous stage from Cahors. The race finished on the Champs-Élysées in Paris on 24 July.

== Stage 11 ==
13 July 1994 — Cahors to Lourdes Hautacam, 259.5 km (161.2 mi)

Stage 11 result

| Rank | Rider | Team | Time |
|---|---|---|---|
| 1 | Luc Leblanc (FRA) | Festina–Lotus | 6h 58' 04" |
| 2 | Miguel Induráin (ESP) | Banesto | + 2" |
| 3 | Marco Pantani (ITA) | Carrera Jeans–Tassoni | + 18" |
| 4 | Richard Virenque (FRA) | Festina–Lotus | + 56" |
| 5 | Armand de Las Cuevas (FRA) | Castorama | + 58" |
| 6 | Pavel Tonkov (RUS) | Lampre–Panaria | + 1' 26" |
| 7 | Piotr Ugrumov (LAT) | Gewiss–Ballan | s.t. |
| 8 | Enrico Zaina (ITA) | Gewiss–Ballan | + 1' 36" |
| 9 | Roberto Conti (ITA) | Lampre–Panaria | + 1' 46" |
| 10 | Laudelino Cubino (ESP) | Kelme–Avianca–Gios | + 1' 50" |

General classification after stage 11

| Rank | Rider | Team | Time |
|---|---|---|---|
| 1 | Miguel Induráin (ESP) | Banesto | 51h 47' 25" |
| 2 | Tony Rominger (SUI) | Mapei–CLAS | + 4' 47" |
| 3 | Armand de Las Cuevas (FRA) | Castorama | + 5' 36" |
| 4 | Piotr Ugrumov (LAT) | Gewiss–Ballan | + 8' 32" |
| 5 | Luc Leblanc (FRA) | Festina–Lotus | + 8' 35" |
| 6 | Bjarne Riis (DEN) | Gewiss–Ballan | + 8' 59" |
| 7 | Gianluca Bortolami (ITA) | Mapei–CLAS | + 9' 14" |
| 8 | Abraham Olano (ESP) | Mapei–CLAS | + 9' 20" |
| 9 | Thomas Davy (FRA) | Castorama | + 9' 46" |
| 10 | Enrico Zaina (ITA) | Gewiss–Ballan | + 11' 15" |

== Stage 12 ==
15 July 1994 — Lourdes to Luz Ardiden, 204.5 km (127.1 mi)

Stage 12 result

| Rank | Rider | Team | Time |
|---|---|---|---|
| 1 | Richard Virenque (FRA) | Festina–Lotus | 6h 08' 32" |
| 2 | Marco Pantani (ITA) | Carrera Jeans–Tassoni | + 4' 34" |
| 3 | Oscar Pelliccioli (ITA) | Team Polti–Vaporetto | + 5' 52" |
| 4 | Nelson Rodríguez Serna (COL) | ZG Mobili–Selle Italia | + 7' 02" |
| 5 | Vladimir Poulnikov (UKR) | Carrera Jeans–Tassoni | + 7' 42" |
| 6 | Miguel Induráin (ESP) | Banesto | s.t. |
| 7 | Luc Leblanc (FRA) | Festina–Lotus | s.t. |
| 8 | Laudelino Cubino (ESP) | Kelme–Avianca–Gios | + 8' 14" |
| 9 | Hernán Buenahora (COL) | Kelme–Avianca–Gios | + 9' 43" |
| 10 | Ángel Camargo (COL) | Kelme–Avianca–Gios | s.t. |

General classification after stage 12

| Rank | Rider | Team | Time |
|---|---|---|---|
| 1 | Miguel Induráin (ESP) | Banesto | 58h 03' 39" |
| 2 | Tony Rominger (SUI) | Mapei–CLAS | + 7' 56" |
| 3 | Richard Virenque (FRA) | Festina–Lotus | s.t. |
| 4 | Armand de Las Cuevas (FRA) | Castorama | + 8' 02" |
| 5 | Luc Leblanc (FRA) | Festina–Lotus | + 8' 35" |
| 6 | Vladimir Poulnikov (UKR) | Carrera Jeans–Tassoni | + 11' 30" |
| 7 | Bjarne Riis (DEN) | Gewiss–Ballan | + 11' 44" |
| 8 | Marco Pantani (ITA) | Carrera Jeans–Tassoni | + 11' 55" |
| 9 | Thomas Davy (FRA) | Castorama | + 12' 26" |
| 10 | Piotr Ugrumov (LAT) | Gewiss–Ballan | + 13' 17" |

== Stage 13 ==
16 July 1994 — Bagnères-de-Bigorre to Albi, 223.0 km (138.6 mi)

Stage 13 result

| Rank | Rider | Team | Time |
|---|---|---|---|
| 1 | Bjarne Riis (DEN) | Gewiss–Ballan | 5h 14' 48" |
| 2 | Ján Svorada (SVK) | Lampre–Panaria | + 9" |
| 3 | Djamolidine Abdoujaparov (UZB) | Team Polti–Vaporetto | s.t. |
| 4 | Silvio Martinello (ITA) | Mercatone Uno–Medeghini | s.t. |
| 5 | Christophe Capelle (FRA) | GAN | s.t. |
| 6 | Jean-Paul van Poppel (NED) | Festina–Lotus | s.t. |
| 7 | Andrei Tchmil (RUS) | Lotto | s.t. |
| 8 | Emmanuel Magnien (FRA) | Castorama | s.t. |
| 9 | François Simon (FRA) | Castorama | s.t. |
| 10 | Marc Sergeant (BEL) | Novemail–Laser Computer | s.t. |

General classification after stage 13

| Rank | Rider | Team | Time |
|---|---|---|---|
| 1 | Miguel Induráin (ESP) | Banesto | 63h 18' 36" |
| 2 | Richard Virenque (FRA) | Festina–Lotus | + 7' 56" |
| 3 | Armand de Las Cuevas (FRA) | Castorama | + 8' 02" |
| 4 | Luc Leblanc (FRA) | Festina–Lotus | + 8' 35" |
| 5 | Vladimir Poulnikov (UKR) | Carrera Jeans–Tassoni | + 11' 30" |
| 6 | Bjarne Riis (DEN) | Gewiss–Ballan | + 11' 35" |
| 7 | Marco Pantani (ITA) | Carrera Jeans–Tassoni | + 11' 55" |
| 8 | Thomas Davy (FRA) | Castorama | + 12' 26" |
| 9 | Piotr Ugrumov (LAT) | Gewiss–Ballan | + 13' 17" |
| 10 | Abraham Olano (ESP) | Mapei–CLAS | + 14' 05" |

== Stage 14 ==
17 July 1994 — Castres to Montpellier, 202.0 km (125.5 mi)

Stage 14 result

| Rank | Rider | Team | Time |
|---|---|---|---|
| 1 | Rolf Sørensen (DEN) | GB–MG Maglificio | 5h 11' 04" |
| 2 | Neil Stephens (AUS) | ONCE | s.t. |
| 3 | Rolf Järmann (SUI) | GB–MG Maglificio | + 1' 13" |
| 4 | Massimo Ghirotto (ITA) | ZG Mobili–Selle Italia | s.t. |
| 5 | Pascal Hervé (FRA) | Festina–Lotus | + 1' 15" |
| 6 | Djamolidine Abdoujaparov (UZB) | Team Polti–Vaporetto | + 5' 56" |
| 7 | Ján Svorada (SVK) | Lampre–Panaria | s.t. |
| 8 | Silvio Martinello (ITA) | Mercatone Uno–Medeghini | s.t. |
| 9 | Marc Sergeant (BEL) | Novemail–Laser Computer | s.t. |
| 10 | Emmanuel Magnien (FRA) | Castorama | s.t. |

General classification after stage 14

| Rank | Rider | Team | Time |
|---|---|---|---|
| 1 | Miguel Induráin (ESP) | Banesto | 68h 35' 36" |
| 2 | Richard Virenque (FRA) | Festina–Lotus | + 7' 56" |
| 3 | Armand de Las Cuevas (FRA) | Castorama | + 8' 02" |
| 4 | Luc Leblanc (FRA) | Festina–Lotus | + 8' 35" |
| 5 | Vladimir Poulnikov (UKR) | Carrera Jeans–Tassoni | + 11' 30" |
| 6 | Bjarne Riis (DEN) | Gewiss–Ballan | s.t. |
| 7 | Marco Pantani (ITA) | Carrera Jeans–Tassoni | + 11' 55" |
| 8 | Thomas Davy (FRA) | Castorama | + 12' 26" |
| 9 | Piotr Ugrumov (LAT) | Gewiss–Ballan | + 13' 37" |
| 10 | Abraham Olano (ESP) | Mapei–CLAS | + 14' 05" |

== Stage 15 ==
18 July 1994 — Montpellier to Carpentras, 231.0 km (143.5 mi)

Stage 15 result

| Rank | Rider | Team | Time |
|---|---|---|---|
| 1 | Eros Poli (ITA) | Mercatone Uno–Medeghini | 6h 31' 59" |
| 2 | Alberto Elli (ITA) | GB–MG Maglificio | + 3' 39" |
| 3 | Pascal Lino (FRA) | Festina–Lotus | s.t. |
| 4 | Roberto Conti (ITA) | Lampre–Panaria | + 3' 41" |
| 5 | Richard Virenque (FRA) | Festina–Lotus | + 4' 00" |
| 6 | Armand de Las Cuevas (FRA) | Castorama | s.t. |
| 7 | Piotr Ugrumov (LAT) | Gewiss–Ballan | s.t. |
| 8 | Alex Zülle (SUI) | ONCE | s.t. |
| 9 | Miguel Induráin (ESP) | Banesto | s.t. |
| 10 | Marco Pantani (ITA) | Carrera Jeans–Tassoni | s.t. |

General classification after stage 15

| Rank | Rider | Team | Time |
|---|---|---|---|
| 1 | Miguel Induráin (ESP) | Banesto | 75h 11' 35" |
| 2 | Richard Virenque (FRA) | Festina–Lotus | + 7' 56" |
| 3 | Armand de Las Cuevas (FRA) | Castorama | + 8' 02" |
| 4 | Luc Leblanc (FRA) | Festina–Lotus | + 8' 35" |
| 5 | Vladimir Poulnikov (UKR) | Carrera Jeans–Tassoni | + 11' 30" |
| 6 | Marco Pantani (ITA) | Carrera Jeans–Tassoni | + 11' 55" |
| 7 | Piotr Ugrumov (LAT) | Gewiss–Ballan | + 13' 37" |
| 8 | Thomas Davy (FRA) | Castorama | + 16' 12" |
| 9 | Alex Zülle (SUI) | ONCE | + 16' 13" |
| 10 | Abraham Olano (ESP) | Mapei–CLAS | + 17' 51" |

== Stage 16 ==
19 July 1994 — Valréas to Alpe d'Huez, 224.5 km (139.5 mi)

Stage 16 result

| Rank | Rider | Team | Time |
|---|---|---|---|
| 1 | Roberto Conti (ITA) | Lampre–Panaria | 6h 06' 45" |
| 2 | Hernán Buenahora (COL) | Kelme–Avianca–Gios | + 2' 02" |
| 3 | Udo Bölts (GER) | Team Telekom | + 3' 49" |
| 4 | Alberto Elli (ITA) | GB–MG Maglificio | s.t. |
| 5 | Giancarlo Perini (ITA) | ZG Mobili–Selle Italia | + 4' 03" |
| 6 | Jörg Müller (SUI) | Mapei–CLAS | + 4' 39" |
| 7 | Bruno Cenghialta (ITA) | Gewiss–Ballan | + 5' 05" |
| 8 | Marco Pantani (ITA) | Carrera Jeans–Tassoni | + 5' 41" |
| 9 | Roberto Torres (ESP) | Festina–Lotus | + 5' 55" |
| 10 | Ángel Camargo (ESP) | Kelme–Avianca–Gios | + 7' 15" |

General classification after stage 16

| Rank | Rider | Team | Time |
|---|---|---|---|
| 1 | Miguel Induráin (ESP) | Banesto | 81h 26' 16" |
| 2 | Richard Virenque (FRA) | Festina–Lotus | + 7' 21" |
| 3 | Luc Leblanc (FRA) | Festina–Lotus | + 8' 35" |
| 4 | Armand de Las Cuevas (FRA) | Castorama | + 9' 15" |
| 5 | Marco Pantani (ITA) | Carrera Jeans–Tassoni | + 9' 40" |
| 6 | Roberto Conti (ITA) | Lampre–Panaria | + 9' 57" |
| 7 | Vladimir Poulnikov (UKR) | Carrera Jeans–Tassoni | + 11' 37" |
| 8 | Alberto Elli (ITA) | GB–MG Maglificio | + 13' 57" |
| 9 | Piotr Ugrumov (LAT) | Gewiss–Ballan | + 14' 08" |
| 10 | Alex Zülle (SUI) | ONCE | + 16' 44" |

== Stage 17 ==
20 July 1994 — Le Bourg-d'Oisans to Val Thorens, 149.0 km (92.6 mi)

Stage 17 result

| Rank | Rider | Team | Time |
|---|---|---|---|
| 1 | Nelson Rodríguez (COL) | ZG Mobili–Selle Italia | 5h 13' 52" |
| 2 | Piotr Ugrumov (LAT) | Gewiss–Ballan | + 3" |
| 3 | Marco Pantani (ITA) | Carrera Jeans–Tassoni | + 1' 08" |
| 4 | Richard Virenque (FRA) | Festina–Lotus | + 2' 37" |
| 5 | Miguel Induráin (ESP) | Banesto | s.t. |
| 6 | Alex Zülle (SUI) | ONCE | s.t. |
| 7 | Luc Leblanc (FRA) | Festina–Lotus | + 2' 40" |
| 8 | Roberto Conti (ITA) | Lampre–Panaria | + 2' 44" |
| 9 | Hernán Buenahora (COL) | Kelme–Avianca–Gios | + 2' 45" |
| 10 | Udo Bölts (GER) | Team Telekom | + 2' 52" |

General classification after stage 17

| Rank | Rider | Team | Time |
|---|---|---|---|
| 1 | Miguel Induráin (ESP) | Banesto | 86h 42' 45" |
| 2 | Richard Virenque (FRA) | Festina–Lotus | + 7' 21" |
| 3 | Marco Pantani (ITA) | Carrera Jeans–Tassoni | + 8' 11" |
| 4 | Luc Leblanc (FRA) | Festina–Lotus | + 8' 38" |
| 5 | Roberto Conti (ITA) | Lampre–Panaria | + 10' 04" |
| 6 | Piotr Ugrumov (LAT) | Gewiss–Ballan | + 11' 34" |
| 7 | Alberto Elli (ITA) | GB–MG Maglificio | + 14' 12" |
| 8 | Alex Zülle (SUI) | ONCE | + 16' 44" |
| 9 | Udo Bölts (GER) | Team Telekom | + 18' 55" |
| 10 | Vladimir Poulnikov (UKR) | Carrera Jeans–Tassoni | + 19' 15" |

== Stage 18 ==
21 July 1994 — Moûtiers to Cluses, 174.5 km (108.4 mi)

Stage 18 result

| Rank | Rider | Team | Time |
|---|---|---|---|
| 1 | Piotr Ugrumov (LAT) | Gewiss–Ballan | 4h 52' 19" |
| 2 | Miguel Induráin (ESP) | Banesto | + 2' 39" |
| 3 | Richard Virenque (FRA) | Festina–Lotus | + 2' 40" |
| 4 | Fernando Escartín (ESP) | Mapei–CLAS | + 3' 25" |
| 5 | Marco Pantani (ITA) | Carrera Jeans–Tassoni | s.t. |
| 6 | Roberto Conti (ITA) | Lampre–Panaria | + 3' 26" |
| 7 | Pascal Lino (FRA) | Festina–Lotus | + 3' 30" |
| 8 | Luc Leblanc (FRA) | Festina–Lotus | s.t. |
| 9 | Artūras Kasputis (LTU) | Chazal–MBK | + 4' 55" |
| 10 | Oscar Pelliccioli (ITA) | Team Polti–Vaporetto | s.t. |

General classification after stage 18

| Rank | Rider | Team | Time |
|---|---|---|---|
| 1 | Miguel Induráin (ESP) | Banesto | 91h 37' 43" |
| 2 | Richard Virenque (FRA) | Festina–Lotus | + 7' 22" |
| 3 | Piotr Ugrumov (LAT) | Gewiss–Ballan | + 8' 55" |
| 4 | Marco Pantani (ITA) | Carrera Jeans–Tassoni | + 8' 57" |
| 5 | Luc Leblanc (FRA) | Festina–Lotus | + 9' 29" |
| 6 | Roberto Conti (ITA) | Lampre–Panaria | + 10' 51" |
| 7 | Alberto Elli (ITA) | GB–MG Maglificio | + 16' 30" |
| 8 | Alex Zülle (SUI) | ONCE | + 19' 02" |
| 9 | Udo Bölts (GER) | Team Telekom | + 21' 13" |
| 10 | Pascal Lino (FRA) | Festina–Lotus | + 21' 23" |

== Stage 19 ==
22 July 1994 — Cluses to Avoriaz, 47.5 km (29.5 mi) (individual time trial)

Stage 19 result

| Rank | Rider | Team | Time |
|---|---|---|---|
| 1 | Piotr Ugrumov (LAT) | Gewiss–Ballan | 1h 22' 59" |
| 2 | Marco Pantani (ITA) | Carrera Jeans–Tassoni | + 1' 38" |
| 3 | Miguel Induráin (ESP) | Banesto | + 3' 16" |
| 4 | Luc Leblanc (FRA) | Festina–Lotus | + 3' 50" |
| 5 | Charly Mottet (FRA) | Novemail–Laser Computer | + 4' 12" |
| 6 | Enrico Zaina (ITA) | Gewiss–Ballan | + 4' 17" |
| 7 | Vladimir Poulnikov (UKR) | Carrera Jeans–Tassoni | + 4' 26" |
| 8 | Jean-François Bernard (FRA) | Banesto | + 4' 31" |
| 9 | Alex Zülle (SUI) | ONCE | + 4' 49" |
| 10 | Roberto Conti (ITA) | Lampre–Panaria | + 4' 54" |

General classification after stage 19

| Rank | Rider | Team | Time |
|---|---|---|---|
| 1 | Miguel Induráin (ESP) | Banesto | 93h 03' 58" |
| 2 | Piotr Ugrumov (LAT) | Gewiss–Ballan | + 5' 39" |
| 3 | Marco Pantani (ITA) | Carrera Jeans–Tassoni | + 7' 19" |
| 4 | Luc Leblanc (FRA) | Festina–Lotus | + 10' 03" |
| 5 | Richard Virenque (FRA) | Festina–Lotus | + 10' 10" |
| 6 | Roberto Conti (ITA) | Lampre–Panaria | + 12' 29" |
| 7 | Alberto Elli (ITA) | GB–MG Maglificio | + 20' 17" |
| 8 | Alex Zülle (SUI) | ONCE | + 20' 35" |
| 9 | Udo Bölts (GER) | Team Telekom | + 25' 19" |
| 10 | Vladimir Poulnikov (UKR) | Carrera Jeans–Tassoni | + 25' 28" |

== Stage 20 ==
23 July 1994 — Morzine to Lac Saint-Point, 208 km (129 mi)

Stage 20 result

| Rank | Rider | Team | Time |
|---|---|---|---|
| 1 | Djamolidine Abdoujaparov (UZB) | Team Polti–Vaporetto | 5h 50' 37" |
| 2 | Ján Svorada (SVK) | Lampre–Panaria | s.t. |
| 3 | Silvio Martinello (ITA) | Mercatone Uno–Medeghini | s.t. |
| 4 | Phil Anderson (AUS) | Motorola | s.t. |
| 5 | Bjarne Riis (DEN) | Gewiss–Ballan | s.t. |
| 6 | Ángel Edo (ESP) | Kelme–Avianca–Gios | s.t. |
| 7 | Gianluca Bortolami (ITA) | Mapei–CLAS | s.t. |
| 8 | Massimo Ghirotto (ITA) | ZG Mobili–Selle Italia | s.t. |
| 9 | Giovanni Fidanza (ITA) | Team Polti–Vaporetto | s.t. |
| 10 | François Simon (FRA) | Castorama | s.t. |

General classification after stage 20

| Rank | Rider | Team | Time |
|---|---|---|---|
| 1 | Miguel Induráin (ESP) | Banesto | 98h 54' 35" |
| 2 | Piotr Ugrumov (LAT) | Gewiss–Ballan | + 5' 39" |
| 3 | Marco Pantani (ITA) | Carrera Jeans–Tassoni | + 7' 19" |
| 4 | Luc Leblanc (FRA) | Festina–Lotus | + 10' 03" |
| 5 | Richard Virenque (FRA) | Festina–Lotus | + 10' 10" |
| 6 | Roberto Conti (ITA) | Lampre–Panaria | + 12' 29" |
| 7 | Alberto Elli (ITA) | GB–MG Maglificio | + 20' 17" |
| 8 | Alex Zülle (SUI) | ONCE | + 20' 35" |
| 9 | Udo Bölts (GER) | Team Telekom | + 25' 19" |
| 10 | Vladimir Poulnikov (UKR) | Carrera Jeans–Tassoni | + 25' 28" |

== Stage 21 ==
24 July 1994 — Disneyland Paris to Paris Champs-Élysées, 188.0 km (116.8 mi)

Stage 21 result

| Rank | Rider | Team | Time |
|---|---|---|---|
| 1 | Eddy Seigneur (FRA) | GAN | 4h 43' 34" |
| 2 | Frankie Andreu (USA) | Motorola | + 3" |
| 3 | Bo Hamburger (DEN) | TVM–Bison Kit | + 6" |
| 4 | Jörg Müller (SUI) | Mapei–CLAS | s.t. |
| 5 | Artūras Kasputis (LTU) | Chazal–MBK | s.t. |
| 6 | Djamolidine Abdoujaparov (UZB) | Team Polti–Vaporetto | + 25" |
| 7 | Viatcheslav Ekimov (RUS) | WordPerfect–Colnago–Decca | + 27" |
| 8 | Silvio Martinello (ITA) | Mercatone Uno–Medeghini | + 29" |
| 9 | Ángel Edo (ESP) | Kelme–Avianca–Gios | s.t. |
| 10 | Olaf Ludwig (GER) | Team Telekom | s.t. |

General classification after stage 21

| Rank | Rider | Team | Time |
|---|---|---|---|
| 1 | Miguel Induráin (ESP) | Banesto | 103h 38' 38" |
| 2 | Piotr Ugrumov (LAT) | Gewiss–Ballan | + 5' 39" |
| 3 | Marco Pantani (ITA) | Carrera Jeans–Tassoni | + 7' 19" |
| 4 | Luc Leblanc (FRA) | Festina–Lotus | + 10' 03" |
| 5 | Richard Virenque (FRA) | Festina–Lotus | + 10' 10" |
| 6 | Roberto Conti (ITA) | Lampre–Panaria | + 12' 29" |
| 7 | Alberto Elli (ITA) | GB–MG Maglificio | + 20' 17" |
| 8 | Alex Zülle (SUI) | ONCE | + 20' 35" |
| 9 | Udo Bölts (GER) | Team Telekom | + 25' 19" |
| 10 | Vladimir Poulnikov (UKR) | Carrera Jeans–Tassoni | + 25' 28" |
