= 1993 Tour du Haut Var =

Race details
- Dates: 20 February 1993
- Stages: 1
- Distance: 199 km (123.7 mi)
- Winning time: 5h 58' 27"

Results
	Winner	Thierry Claveyrolat (FRA)
	Second	Fabian Jeker (SUI)
	Third	Gérard Guazzini (FRA)

The 1993 Tour du Haut Var was the 25th edition of the Tour du Haut Var cycle race and was held on 20 February 1993. The race started in Seillans and finished in Draguignan. The race was won by Thierry Claveyrolat.

== General classification ==
Final general classification

Rank	Rider	Time
1	Thierry Claveyrolat (FRA)	5h 58' 27"
2	Fabian Jeker (SUI)	+ 3' 58"
3	Gérard Guazzini (FRA)	+ 4' 34"
4	Johan Museeuw (BEL)	+ 5' 14"
5	Jo Planckaert (BEL)	+ 5' 14"
6	Thierry Gouvenou (FRA)	+ 5' 14"
7	François Simon (FRA)	+ 5' 14"
8	Kai Hundertmarck (GER)	+ 5' 14"
9	Marc Sergeant (BEL)	+ 5' 14"
10	Peter Farazijn (BEL)	+ 5' 14"
