= 1994 Tour de France, Prologue to Stage 10 =

Cycling race stages

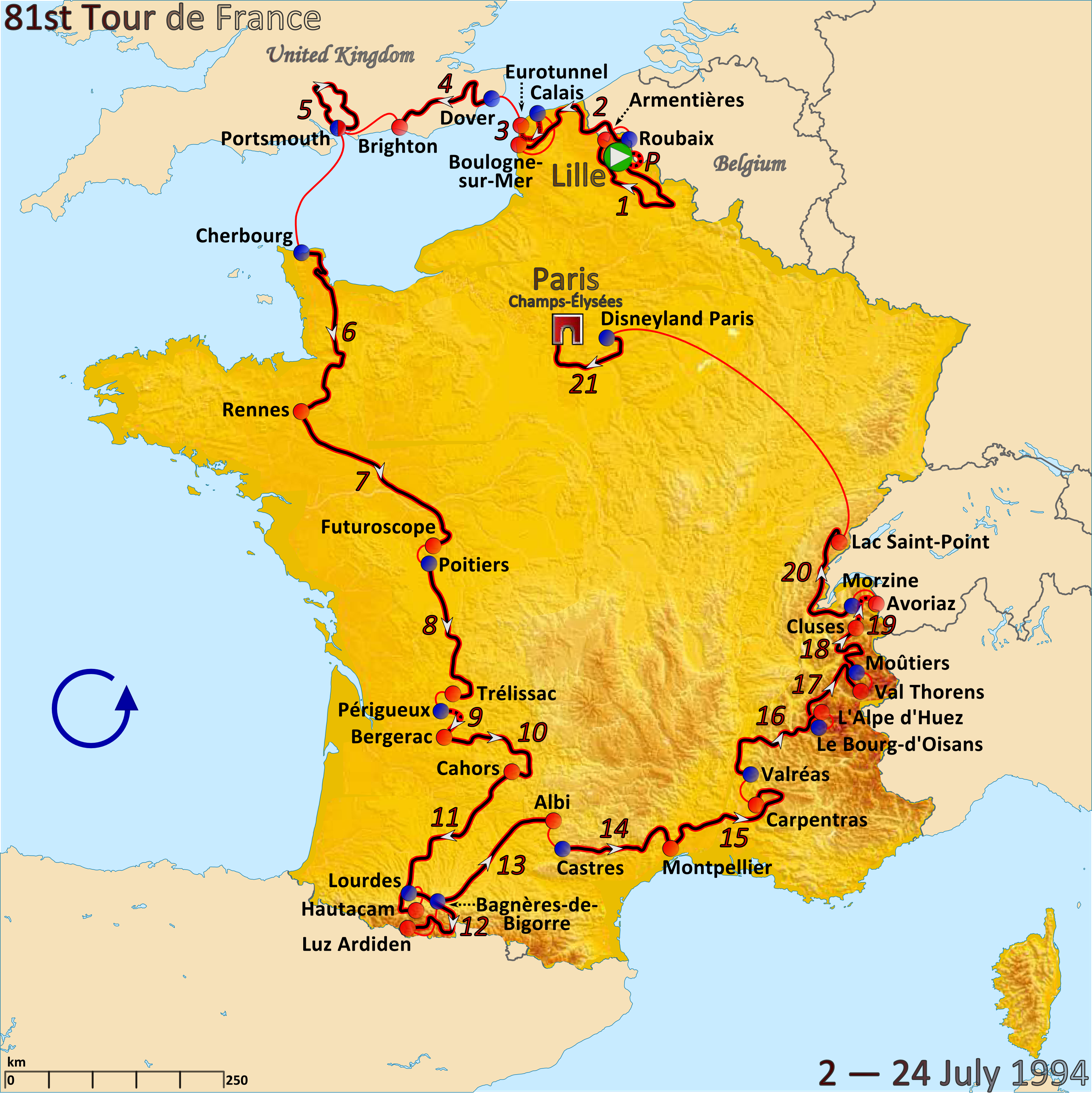
Route of the 1994 Tour de France

The 1994 Tour de France was the 81st edition of Tour de France, one of cycling's Grand Tours. The Tour began in Lille with a prologue individual time trial on 2 July and Stage 10 occurred on 12 July with a flat stage to Cahors. The race finished on the Champs-Élysées in Paris on 24 July.

== Prologue ==
2 July 1994 — Lille to Lille, 7.2 km (4.5 mi) (individual time trial)

Prologue result and general classification after prologue

Rank	Rider	Team	Time
1	Chris Boardman (GBR)	GAN	7' 49"
2	Miguel Indurain (ESP)	Banesto	+ 15"
3	Tony Rominger (SUI)	Mapei–CLAS	+ 19"
4	Alex Zülle (SUI)	ONCE	+ 22"
5	Armand de Las Cuevas (FRA)	Castorama	+ 24"
6	Thierry Marie (FRA)	Castorama	+ 29"
7	Eddy Seigneur (FRA)	GAN	+ 30"
8	Johan Museeuw (BEL)	GB–MG Maglificio	+ 31"
9	Claudio Chiappucci (ITA)	Carrera Jeans–Tassoni	+ 33"
10	Andrea Peron (ITA)	Team Polti–Vaporetto	+ 34"

== Stage 1 ==
3 July 1994 — Lille to Armentières, 222.5 km (138.3 mi)

Stage 1 result

Rank	Rider	Team	Time
1	Djamolidine Abdoujaparov (UZB)	Team Polti–Vaporetto	5h 46' 16"
2	Olaf Ludwig (GER)	Team Telekom	s.t.
3	Johan Museeuw (BEL)	GB–MG Maglificio	s.t.
4	Silvio Martinello (ITA)	Mercatone Uno–Medeghini	s.t.
5	Andrei Tchmil (RUS)	Lotto	s.t.
6	Ján Svorada (SVK)	Lampre–Panaria	s.t.
7	Giovanni Fidanza (ITA)	Team Polti–Vaporetto	s.t.
8	Emmanuel Magnien (FRA)	Castorama	s.t.
9	Miguel Indurain (ESP)	Banesto	s.t.
10	Gianluca Bortolami (ITA)	Mapei–CLAS	s.t.

General classification after stage 1

Rank	Rider	Team	Time
1	Chris Boardman (GBR)	GAN	5h 54' 05"
2	Miguel Indurain (ESP)	Banesto	+ 15"
3	Tony Rominger (SUI)	Mapei–CLAS	+ 19"
4	Alex Zülle (SUI)	ONCE	+ 22"
5	Johan Museeuw (BEL)	GB–MG Maglificio	+ 23"
6	Armand de Las Cuevas (FRA)	Castorama	+ 24"
7	Djamolidine Abdoujaparov (UZB)	Team Polti–Vaporetto	+ 27"
8	Thierry Marie (FRA)	Castorama	+ 29"
9	Eddy Seigneur (FRA)	GAN	+ 30"
10	Olaf Ludwig (GER)	Team Telekom	+ 32"

== Stage 2 ==
4 July 1994 — Roubaix to Boulogne-sur-Mer, 190 km (118.1 mi)

Stage 2 result

Rank	Rider	Team	Time
1	Jean-Paul van Poppel (NED)	Festina–Lotus	5h 05' 40"
2	Olaf Ludwig (GER)	Team Telekom	s.t.
3	Silvio Martinello (ITA)	Mercatone Uno–Medeghini	s.t.
4	François Simon (FRA)	Castorama	s.t.
5	Johan Museeuw (BEL)	GB–MG Maglificio	s.t.
6	Djamolidine Abdoujaparov (UZB)	Team Polti–Vaporetto	s.t.
7	Laurent Desbiens (FRA)	Castorama	s.t.
8	Ángel Edo (ESP)	Kelme–Avianca–Gios	s.t.
9	Fabiano Fontanelli (ITA)	ZG Mobili-Selle Italia	s.t.
10	Andrei Tchmil (RUS)	Lotto	s.t.

General classification after stage 2

Rank	Rider	Team	Time
1	Chris Boardman (GBR)	GAN	10h 59' 45"
2	Miguel Indurain (ESP)	Banesto	+ 15"
3	Tony Rominger (SUI)	Mapei–CLAS	+ 19"
4	Olaf Ludwig (GER)	Team Telekom	+ 20"
5	Djamolidine Abdoujaparov (UZB)	Team Polti–Vaporetto	+ 21"
6	Alex Zülle (SUI)	ONCE	+ 22"
7	Johan Museeuw (BEL)	GB–MG Maglificio	+ 23"
8	Armand de Las Cuevas (FRA)	Castorama	+ 24"
9	Thierry Marie (FRA)	Castorama	+ 29"
10	Eddy Seigneur (FRA)	GAN	+ 30"

== Stage 3 ==
5 July 1994 — Calais to Eurotunnel, 62 km (39 mi) (team time trial)

Stage 3 result

Rank	Team	Time
1	GB–MG Maglificio	1h 20' 31"
2	Motorola	+ 6"
3	Banesto	+ 18"
4	Castorama	+ 27"
5	Mapei–CLAS	+ 42"
6	Gewiss–Ballan	+ 1' 02"
7	Lampre–Panaria	+ 1' 15"
8	GAN	+ 1' 17"
9	Team Polti–Vaporetto	+ 1' 23"
10	WordPerfect–Colnago–Decca	+ 1' 55"

General classification after stage 3

Rank	Rider	Team	Time
1	Johan Museeuw (BEL)	GB–MG Maglificio	12h 20' 39"
2	Miguel Indurain (ESP)	Banesto	+ 10"
3	Rolf Sørensen (DEN)	GB–MG Maglificio	+ 19"
4	Flavio Vanzella (ITA)	GB–MG Maglificio	+ 22"
5	Lance Armstrong (USA)	Motorola	s.t.
6	Steve Bauer (CAN)	Motorola	+ 27"
7	Armand de Las Cuevas (FRA)	Castorama	+ 28"
8	Thierry Marie (FRA)	Castorama	+ 33"
9	Sean Yates (GBR)	Motorola	+ 34"
10	Tony Rominger (SUI)	Mapei–CLAS	+ 38"

== Stage 4 ==
6 July 1994 — Dover (Great Britain) to Brighton (Great Britain), 204 km (127 mi)

Stage 4 result

Rank	Rider	Team	Time
1	Francisco Cabello (ESP)	Kelme–Avianca–Gios	5h 12' 53"
2	Emmanuel Magnien (FRA)	Castorama	+ 20"
3	Flavio Vanzella (ITA)	GB–MG Maglificio	s.t.
4	Chris Boardman (GBR)	GAN	+ 33"
5	Enrico Zaina (ITA)	Gewiss–Ballan	s.t.
6	Silvio Martinello (ITA)	Mercatone Uno–Medeghini	+ 38"
7	Djamolidine Abdoujaparov (UZB)	Team Polti–Vaporetto	s.t.
8	Rolf Aldag (GER)	Team Telekom	s.t.
9	Stefano Colagè (ITA)	ZG Mobili-Selle Italia	s.t.
10	Frankie Andreu (USA)	Motorola	s.t.

General classification after stage 4

Rank	Rider	Team	Time
1	Flavio Vanzella (ITA)	GB–MG Maglificio	17h 34' 06"
2	Johan Museeuw (BEL)	GB–MG Maglificio	+ 4"
3	Miguel Indurain (ESP)	Banesto	+ 14"
4	Rolf Sørensen (DEN)	GB–MG Maglificio	+ 23"
5	Lance Armstrong (USA)	Motorola	+ 26"
6	Steve Bauer (CAN)	Motorola	+ 31"
7	Armand de Las Cuevas (FRA)	Castorama	+ 32"
8	Thierry Marie (FRA)	Castorama	+ 37"
9	Sean Yates (GBR)	Motorola	+ 38"
10	Tony Rominger (SUI)	Mapei–CLAS	+ 42"

== Stage 5 ==
7 July 1994 — Portsmouth (Great Britain) to Portsmouth (Great Britain), 187.0 km (116.2 mi)

Stage 5 result

Rank	Rider	Team	Time
1	Nicola Minali (ITA)	Gewiss–Ballan	4h 10' 49"
2	Olaf Ludwig (GER)	Team Telekom	s.t.
3	Silvio Martinello (ITA)	Mercatone Uno–Medeghini	s.t.
4	Ján Svorada (SVK)	Lampre–Panaria	s.t.
5	Djamolidine Abdoujaparov (UZB)	Team Polti–Vaporetto	s.t.
6	Jean-Paul van Poppel (NED)	Festina–Lotus	s.t.
7	Johan Capiot (BEL)	TVM–Bison Kit	s.t.
8	Jaan Kirsipuu (EST)	Chazal–MBK	s.t.
9	Gianluca Bortolami (ITA)	Mapei–CLAS	s.t.
10	Christophe Capelle (FRA)	GAN	s.t.

General classification after stage 5

Rank	Rider	Team	Time
1	Flavio Vanzella (ITA)	GB–MG Maglificio	21h 44' 55"
2	Johan Museeuw (BEL)	GB–MG Maglificio	+ 4"
3	Miguel Indurain (ESP)	Banesto	+ 14"
4	Lance Armstrong (USA)	Motorola	+ 26"
5	Armand de Las Cuevas (FRA)	Castorama	+ 32"
6	Thierry Marie (FRA)	Castorama	+ 37"
7	Sean Yates (GBR)	Motorola	+ 38"
8	Tony Rominger (SUI)	Mapei–CLAS	+ 42"
9	Frankie Andreu (USA)	Motorola	+ 43"
10	Thomas Davy (FRA)	Castorama	+ 43"

== Stage 6 ==
8 July 1994 — Cherbourg-en-Cotentin to Rennes, 270.5 km (168.1 mi)

Stage 6 result

Rank	Rider	Team	Time
1	Gianluca Bortolami (ITA)	Mapei–CLAS	6h 58' 47"
2	Djamolidine Abdoujaparov (UZB)	Team Polti–Vaporetto	+ 2"
3	Beat Zberg (SUI)	Carrera Jeans–Tassoni	s.t.
4	Guido Bontempi (ITA)	Gewiss–Ballan	s.t.
5	Jens Heppner (GER)	Team Telekom	s.t.
6	Sean Yates (GBR)	Motorola	s.t.
7	Frankie Andreu (USA)	Motorola	s.t.
8	Ján Svorada (SVK)	Lampre–Panaria	+ 46"
9	Jaan Kirsipuu (EST)	Chazal–MBK	s.t.
10	Ángel Edo (ESP)	Kelme–Avianca–Gios	s.t.

General classification after stage 6

Rank	Rider	Team	Time
1	Sean Yates (GBR)	Motorola	28h 44' 22"
2	Gianluca Bortolami (ITA)	Mapei–CLAS	+ 1"
3	Johan Museeuw (BEL)	GB–MG Maglificio	+ 4"
4	Frankie Andreu (USA)	Motorola	+ 5"
5	Flavio Vanzella (ITA)	GB–MG Maglificio	+ 6"
6	Miguel Indurain (ESP)	Banesto	+ 20"
7	Djamolidine Abdoujaparov (UZB)	Team Polti–Vaporetto	+ 31"
8	Lance Armstrong (USA)	Motorola	+ 32"
9	Thierry Marie (FRA)	Castorama	+ 37"
10	Armand de Las Cuevas (FRA)	Castorama	+ 38"

== Stage 7 ==
9 July 1994 — Rennes to Futuroscope, 259.5 km (161.2 mi)

Stage 7 result

Rank	Rider	Team	Time
1	Ján Svorada (SVK)	Lampre–Panaria	5h 56' 50"
2	Djamolidine Abdoujaparov (UZB)	Team Polti–Vaporetto	s.t.
3	Olaf Ludwig (GER)	Team Telekom	s.t.
4	Nicola Minali (ITA)	Gewiss–Ballan	s.t.
5	Christophe Capelle (FRA)	GAN	s.t.
6	Silvio Martinello (ITA)	Mercatone Uno–Medeghini	s.t.
7	Mario De Clercq (BEL)	Lotto	s.t.
8	Jesper Skibby (DEN)	TVM–Bison Kit	s.t.
9	Johan Museeuw (BEL)	GB–MG Maglificio	s.t.
10	Emmanuel Magnien (FRA)	Castorama	s.t.

General classification after stage 7

Rank	Rider	Team	Time
1	Johan Museeuw (BEL)	GB–MG Maglificio	34h 41' 06"
2	Sean Yates (GBR)	Motorola	+ 6"
3	Gianluca Bortolami (ITA)	Mapei–CLAS	+ 7"
4	Flavio Vanzella (ITA)	GB–MG Maglificio	+ 10"
5	Frankie Andreu (USA)	Motorola	+ 11"
6	Djamolidine Abdoujaparov (UZB)	Team Polti–Vaporetto	+ 19"
7	Miguel Indurain (ESP)	Banesto	+ 26"
8	Lance Armstrong (USA)	Motorola	+ 38"
9	Thierry Marie (FRA)	Castorama	+ 43"
10	Armand de Las Cuevas (FRA)	Castorama	+ 44"

== Stage 8 ==
10 July 1994 — Poitiers to Trélissac, 218.5 km (135.8 mi)

Stage 8 result

Rank	Rider	Team	Time
1	Bo Hamburger (DEN)	TVM–Bison Kit	5h 09' 27"
2	Ángel Camargo (COL)	Kelme–Avianca–Gios	+ 1"
3	Rolf Aldag (GER)	Team Telekom	+ 5"
4	Luc Leblanc (FRA)	Festina–Lotus	s.t.
5	Emmanuel Magnien (FRA)	Castorama	+ 2' 16"
6	Ján Svorada (SVK)	Lampre–Panaria	s.t.
7	Djamolidine Abdoujaparov (UZB)	Team Polti–Vaporetto	s.t.
8	Silvio Martinello (ITA)	Mercatone Uno–Medeghini	s.t.
9	Nicola Minali (ITA)	Gewiss–Ballan	s.t.
10	Gianluca Bortolami (ITA)	Mapei–CLAS	s.t.

General classification after stage 8

Rank	Rider	Team	Time
1	Johan Museeuw (BEL)	GB–MG Maglificio	39h 52' 45"
2	Gianluca Bortolami (ITA)	Mapei–CLAS	+ 5"
3	Sean Yates (GBR)	Motorola	+ 10"
4	Frankie Andreu (USA)	Motorola	+ 13"
5	Flavio Vanzella (ITA)	GB–MG Maglificio	+ 14"
6	Djamolidine Abdoujaparov (UZB)	Team Polti–Vaporetto	+ 23"
7	Miguel Indurain (ESP)	Banesto	+ 30"
8	Lance Armstrong (USA)	Motorola	+ 42"
9	Armand de Las Cuevas (FRA)	Castorama	+ 48"
10	Tony Rominger (SUI)	Mapei–CLAS	+ 58"

== Stage 9 ==
11 July 1994 — Périgueux to Bergerac, 64.0 km (39.8 mi) (individual time trial)

Stage 9 result

Rank	Rider	Team	Time
1	Miguel Indurain (ESP)	Banesto	1h 15' 58"
2	Tony Rominger (SUI)	Mapei–CLAS	+ 2' 00"
3	Armand de Las Cuevas (FRA)	Castorama	+ 4' 22"
4	Thierry Marie (FRA)	Castorama	+ 4' 45"
5	Chris Boardman (GBR)	GAN	+ 5' 27"
6	Bjarne Riis (DEN)	Gewiss–Ballan	+ 5' 33"
7	Thomas Davy (FRA)	Castorama	+ 5' 35"
8	Abraham Olano (ESP)	Mapei–CLAS	+ 5' 45"
9	Artūras Kasputis (LTU)	Chazal–MBK	+ 6' 01"
10	Piotr Ugrumov (LAT)	Gewiss–Ballan	+ 6' 04"

General classification after stage 9

Rank	Rider	Team	Time
1	Miguel Indurain (ESP)	Banesto	41h 09' 13"
2	Tony Rominger (SUI)	Mapei–CLAS	+ 2' 28"
3	Armand de Las Cuevas (FRA)	Castorama	+ 4' 40"
4	Gianluca Bortolami (ITA)	Mapei–CLAS	+ 5' 47"
5	Thierry Marie (FRA)	Castorama	+ 5' 51"
6	Thomas Davy (FRA)	Castorama	+ 6' 04"
7	Chris Boardman (GBR)	GAN	+ 6' 06"
8	Sean Yates (GBR)	Motorola	+ 6' 30"
9	Abraham Olano (ESP)	Mapei–CLAS	+ 6' 31"
10	Lance Armstrong (USA)	Motorola	+ 6' 35"

== Stage 10 ==
12 July 1994 — Bergerac to Cahors, 160.5 km (99.7 mi)

Stage 10 result

Rank	Rider	Team	Time
1	Jacky Durand (FRA)	Castorama	3h 38' 11"
2	Marco Serpellini (ITA)	Lampre–Panaria	+ 55"
3	Stephen Hodge (AUS)	Festina–Lotus	+ 59"
4	Gianluca Bortolami (ITA)	Mapei–CLAS	s.t.
5	Christian Henn (GER)	Team Telekom	s.t.
6	Jean-Claude Colotti (FRA)	GAN	+ 1' 03"
7	Mario Chiesa (ITA)	Carrera Jeans–Tassoni	+ 1' 18"
8	Djamolidine Abdoujaparov (UZB)	Team Polti–Vaporetto	+ 1' 55"
9	Ján Svorada (SVK)	Lampre–Panaria	s.t.
10	Silvio Martinello (ITA)	Mercatone Uno–Medeghini	s.t.

General classification after stage 10

Rank	Rider	Team	Time
1	Miguel Indurain (ESP)	Banesto	44h 49' 19"
2	Tony Rominger (SUI)	Mapei–CLAS	+ 2' 28"
3	Gianluca Bortolami (ITA)	Mapei–CLAS	+ 4' 37"
4	Armand de Las Cuevas (FRA)	Castorama	+ 4' 40"
5	Thierry Marie (FRA)	Castorama	+ 5' 51"
6	Thomas Davy (FRA)	Castorama	+ 6' 04"
7	Chris Boardman (GBR)	GAN	+ 6' 06"
8	Sean Yates (GBR)	Motorola	+ 6' 30"
9	Abraham Olano (ESP)	Mapei–CLAS	+ 6' 31"
10	Lance Armstrong (USA)	Motorola	+ 6' 35"
