= 1994 Tour du Haut Var =

Race details
- Dates: 19 February 1994
- Stages: 1
- Distance: 199 km (123.7 mi)
- Winning time: 5h 19' 10"

Results
	Winner	Laurent Brochard (FRA)
	Second	Eddy Seigneur (FRA)
	Third	Ronan Pensec (FRA)

The 1994 Tour du Haut Var was the 26th edition of the Tour du Haut Var cycle race and was held on 19 February 1994. The race started in Fréjus and finished in Draguignan. The race was won by Laurent Brochard.

== General classification ==
Final general classification

Rank	Rider	Time
1	Laurent Brochard (FRA)	5h 19' 10"
2	Eddy Seigneur (FRA)	+ 1' 20"
3	Ronan Pensec (FRA)	+ 1' 26"
4	Gilles Delion (FRA)	+ 1' 38"
5	Christophe Manin (FRA)	+ 1' 38"
6	Oscar Pelliccioli (ITA)	+ 1' 38"
7	Richard Virenque (FRA)	+ 1' 44"
8	Edwig Van Hooydonck (BEL)	+ 3' 05"
9	Marc Madiot (FRA)	+ 3' 05"
10	Lance Armstrong (USA)	+ 3' 05"
