= Marco Vermey =

Dutch cyclist

Personal information
- Born: 11 June 1965 (age 61) Lisse, Netherlands

Cycling career
- Sport: Cycling
- Role: Rider

Marco Vermey (born 11 June 1965) is a Dutch former professional racing cyclist. He rode in the 1994 Tour de France.
