= Gianvito Martinelli =

Italian cyclist

Personal information
- Born: 23 May 1969 (age 57) Bergamo, Italy

Cycling career
- Sport: Cycling
- Role: Rider

Gianvito Martinelli (born 23 May 1969) is an Italian former professional racing cyclist. He rode in the 1994 Tour de France.
