= José Ramón Uriarte =

Spanish cyclist (born 1967)

Personal information
- Born: 21 January 1967 (age 59) Igorre, Spain

Cycling career
- Sport: Cycling
- Current team: Retired
- Discipline: Road
- Role: Rider

Professional teams
- 1990–1997: Banesto
- 1998–1999: Festina–Lotus

José Ramón Uriarte (born 21 January 1967) is a Spanish former professional racing cyclist. He rode in five editions of the Tour de France, three editions of the Giro d'Italia and five editions of the Vuelta a España.

== Major results ==
1992
10th Subida a Urkiola
1993
1st Trofeo Luis Ocaña
3rd Trofeo Forla de Navarra
1994
1st Stage 4 Vuelta a Mallorca
1st Stage 4 Vuelta a los Valles Mineros
3rd Trofeo Forla de Navarra
8th Subida a Urkiola
1996
10th Overall Volta ao Alentejo
1997
1st Stage 4b Troféu Joaquim Agostinho
1st Subida a Txitxarro
8th Overall Vuelta a los Valles Mineros
1998
10th Subida a Urkiola

=== Grand Tour general classification results timeline ===
Grand Tour	1991	1992	1993	1994	1995	1996	1997	1998	1999
Giro d'Italia	—	80	—	52	—	—	—	DNF	—
Tour de France	—	63	94	49	69	92	—	—	—
Vuelta a España	DNF	—	17	—	63	—	—	29	65
