= 1994 Tour de France =

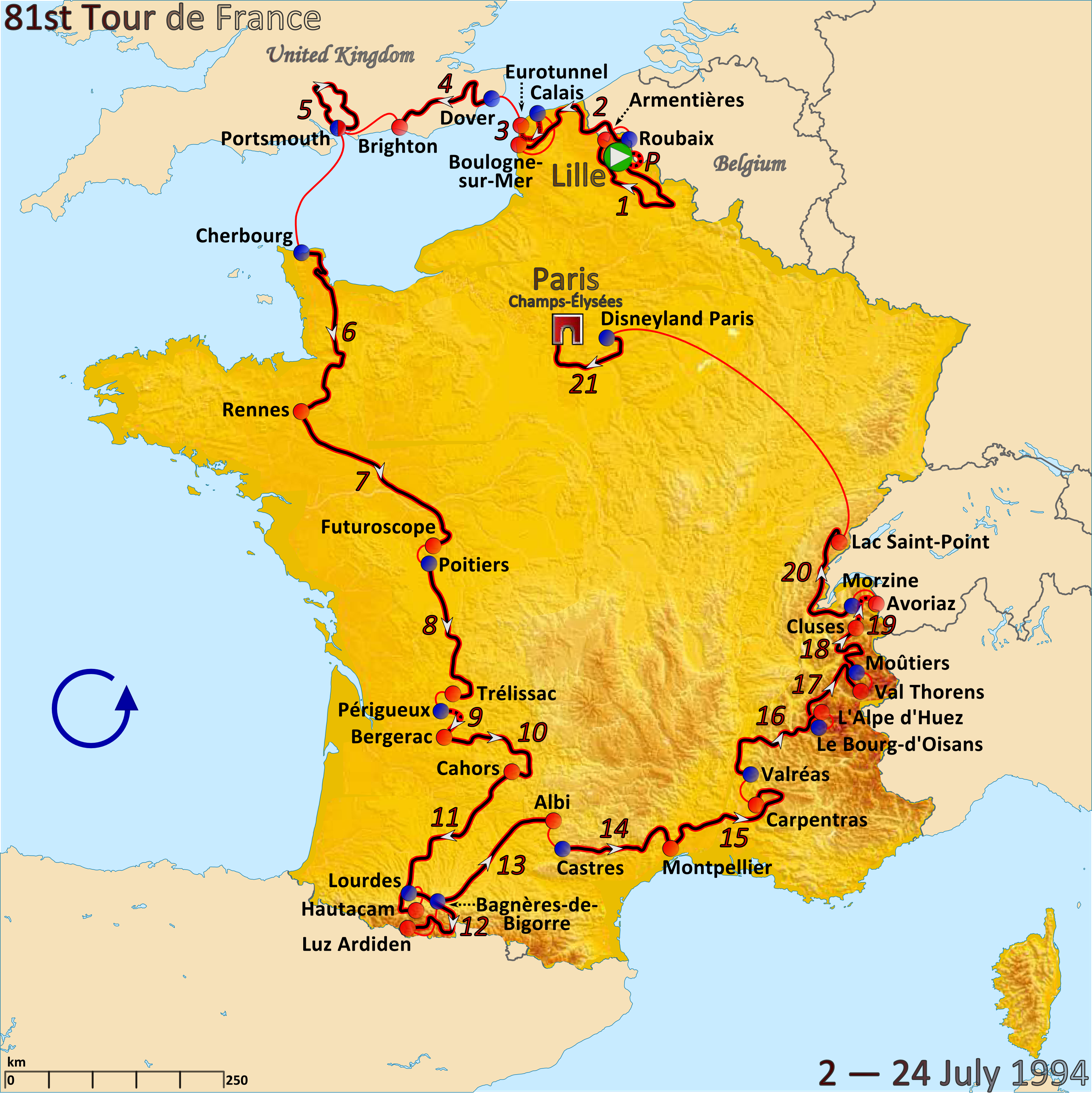
- Route of the 1994 Tour de France

Race details
- Dates: 2–24 July 1994
- Stages: 21 + Prologue
- Distance: 3,978 km (2,472 mi)
- Winning time: 103h 38' 38"

Results
Jersey awarded to the overall winner	Winner	Miguel Induráin (ESP)	(Banesto)
	Second	Piotr Ugrumov (LAT)	(Gewiss–Ballan)
	Third	Marco Pantani (ITA)	(Carrera Jeans–Tassoni)
Jersey awarded to the points classification winner	Points	Djamolidine Abdoujaparov (UZB)	(Team Polti–Vaporetto)
Jersey awarded to the mountains classification winner	Mountains	Richard Virenque (FRA)	(Festina–Lotus)
	Young rider	Marco Pantani (ITA)	(Carrera Jeans–Tassoni)
	Combativity	Eros Poli (ITA)	(Mercatone Uno–Medeghini)
	Team	Festina–Lotus	

The 1994 Tour de France was the 81st edition of the Tour de France, one of cycling's Grand Tours. The Tour began on 2 July with a 7.2 km (4.5 mi) prologue around the French city Lille. After 21 more days of racing, the Tour came to a close on the street of the Champs-Élysées. Twenty-one teams entered the race that was won by Miguel Induráin of the Banesto team. Second and third respectively were the Latvian Piotr Ugrumov and the Italian rider, Marco Pantani.

Miguel Induráin first captured the lead after the stage 9 individual time trial. Chris Boardman was the first rider to wear the yellow jersey as leader of the general classification after winning the opening prologue. Boardman lost the lead to Johan Museeuw after Museeuw's GB–MG Maglificio team won the stage three team time trial. Flavio Vanzella took the lead away from Museeuw the next day as the Tour made its way into Great Britain. Vanzella lost the lead to Sean Yates after the race's sixth stage. Yates led the race for a single day before losing it to Museeuw after the conclusion of stage 7. Museeuw lost the lead to Indurain after the stage 9 individual time trial, who then successfully defended the lead through the Alps and Pyrenees and to the Tour's finish in Paris.

Indurain became the third rider to win four consecutive Tours de France. In the race's other classifications, Team Polti–Vaporetto rider Djamolidine Abdoujaparov won the points classification, Richard Virenque of the Festina–Lotus team won the mountains classification, Carrera Jeans–Tassoni rider Marco Pantani won the youth classification for the best rider aged 26 or under in the general classification after having finished third overall, and Eros Poli of the Mercatone Uno–Medeghini team won the combativity classification. Festina–Lotus won the team classification, which ranked each of the twenty teams contesting the race by lowest cumulative time.

== Teams ==
A total of 21 teams were invited to participate in the 1994 Tour de France. Fifteen teams were announced in May, based on their UCI ranking: Although the organisation had planned to give five additional wildcards in June, after the 1994 Giro d'Italia, it was decided to invite one extra team, and six wildcards were given. The Jolly Componibili–Cage team of Zenon Jaskuła, who had finished in third place in the 1993 Tour de France, was not selected. Each team sent a squad of nine riders, so the Tour began with a peloton of 189 cyclists; of these, a total of 117 riders made it to the finish in Paris.

The teams entering the race were:

Qualified teams

- Banesto
- Carrera Jeans–Tassoni
- Castorama
- GAN
- GB–MG Maglificio
- Gewiss–Ballan
- Lampre–Panaria
- Lotto
- Mapei–CLAS
- Mercatone Uno–Medeghini
- Motorola
- Novemail–Histor–Laser Computer
- ONCE
- Team Polti–Vaporetto
- WordPerfect–Colnago–Decca

Invited teams

- Chazal–MBK
- Festina–Lotus
- Kelme–Avianca–Gios
- Team Telekom
- TVM–Bison Kit
- ZG Mobili

== Route and stages ==
The 1994 edition of the Tour de France began with a short 7.2 km (4.5 mi) prologue that navigated around the French city of Lille. There were a total of six stages that held many high mountains, while there was only one hilly stage that contained climbs of lesser degree. Eleven of the stages were primarily flat stages. The official route contained four time trials, three of which were individual and one of which was a team event.

The tour visited England for the second time to mark the opening of the Channel Tunnel. Stage 4 began in the Channel port of Dover, running through the Kent and Sussex countryside to Brighton, and Stage 5 was a loop around the naval city of Portsmouth.

Of the stages that contained mountains, four contained summit finishes: stage 11 to Hautacam, stage 12 to Luz Ardiden, stage 16 to Alpe d'Huez, and stage 17 to Val Thorens. The nineteenth stage, an individual time trial, had a summit finish to Avoriaz. The highest point of elevation in the race was 2,275 m (7,464 ft) at the summit of the Val Thorens climb on stage 17.

Stage characteristics and winners
Stage	Date	Course	Distance	Type	Winner
P	2 July	Lille	7.2 km (4.5 mi)	Individual time trial	Chris Boardman (GBR)
1	3 July	Lille to Armentières	234.0 km (145.4 mi)	Plain stage	Djamolidine Abdoujaparov (UZB)
2	4 July	Roubaix to Boulogne-sur-Mer	203.5 km (126.4 mi)	Plain stage	Jean-Paul van Poppel (NED)
3	5 July	Calais to Eurotunnel	66.5 km (41.3 mi)	Team time trial	(Italy) GB–MG Maglificio
4	6 July	Dover (United Kingdom) to Brighton (United Kingdom)	204.5 km (127.1 mi)	Plain stage	Francisco Cabello (ESP)
5	7 July	Portsmouth (United Kingdom)	187.0 km (116.2 mi)	Plain stage	Nicola Minali (ITA)
6	8 July	Cherbourg-en-Cotentin to Rennes	270.5 km (168.1 mi)	Plain stage	Gianluca Bortolami (ITA)
7	9 July	Rennes to Futuroscope	259.5 km (161.2 mi)	Plain stage	Ján Svorada (SVK)
8	10 July	Poitiers to Trélissac	218.5 km (135.8 mi)	Plain stage	Bo Hamburger (DEN)
9	11 July	Périgueux to Bergerac	64.0 km (39.8 mi)	Individual time trial	Miguel Induráin (ESP)
10	12 July	Bergerac to Cahors	160.5 km (99.7 mi)	Plain stage	Jacky Durand (FRA)
11	13 July	Cahors to Hautacam	263.5 km (163.7 mi)	Stage with mountain(s)	Luc Leblanc (FRA)
	14 July	Lourdes		Rest day	
12	15 July	Lourdes to Luz Ardiden	204.5 km (127.1 mi)	Stage with mountain(s)	Richard Virenque (FRA)
13	16 July	Bagnères-de-Bigorre to Albi	223.0 km (138.6 mi)	Plain stage	Bjarne Riis (DEN)
14	17 July	Castres to Montpellier	202.0 km (125.5 mi)	Plain stage	Rolf Sørensen (DEN)
15	18 July	Montpellier to Carpentras	231.0 km (143.5 mi)	Stage with mountain(s)	Eros Poli (ITA)
16	19 July	Valréas to Alpe d'Huez	224.5 km (139.5 mi)	Stage with mountain(s)	Roberto Conti (ITA)
17	20 July	Le Bourg-d'Oisans to Val Thorens	149.0 km (92.6 mi)	Stage with mountain(s)	Nelson Rodríguez (COL)
18	21 July	Moutiers to Cluses	174.5 km (108.4 mi)	Stage with mountain(s)	Piotr Ugrumov (LAT)
19	22 July	Cluses to Avoriaz	47.5 km (29.5 mi)	Mountain time trial	Piotr Ugrumov (LAT)
20	23 July	Morzine to Lac Saint-Point	208.5 km (129.6 mi)	Hilly stage	Djamolidine Abdoujaparov (UZB)
21	24 July	Disneyland Paris to Paris (Champs-Élysées)	175.0 km (108.7 mi)	Plain stage	Eddy Seigneur (FRA)
	Total		3,978 km (2,472 mi)		

== Race overview ==
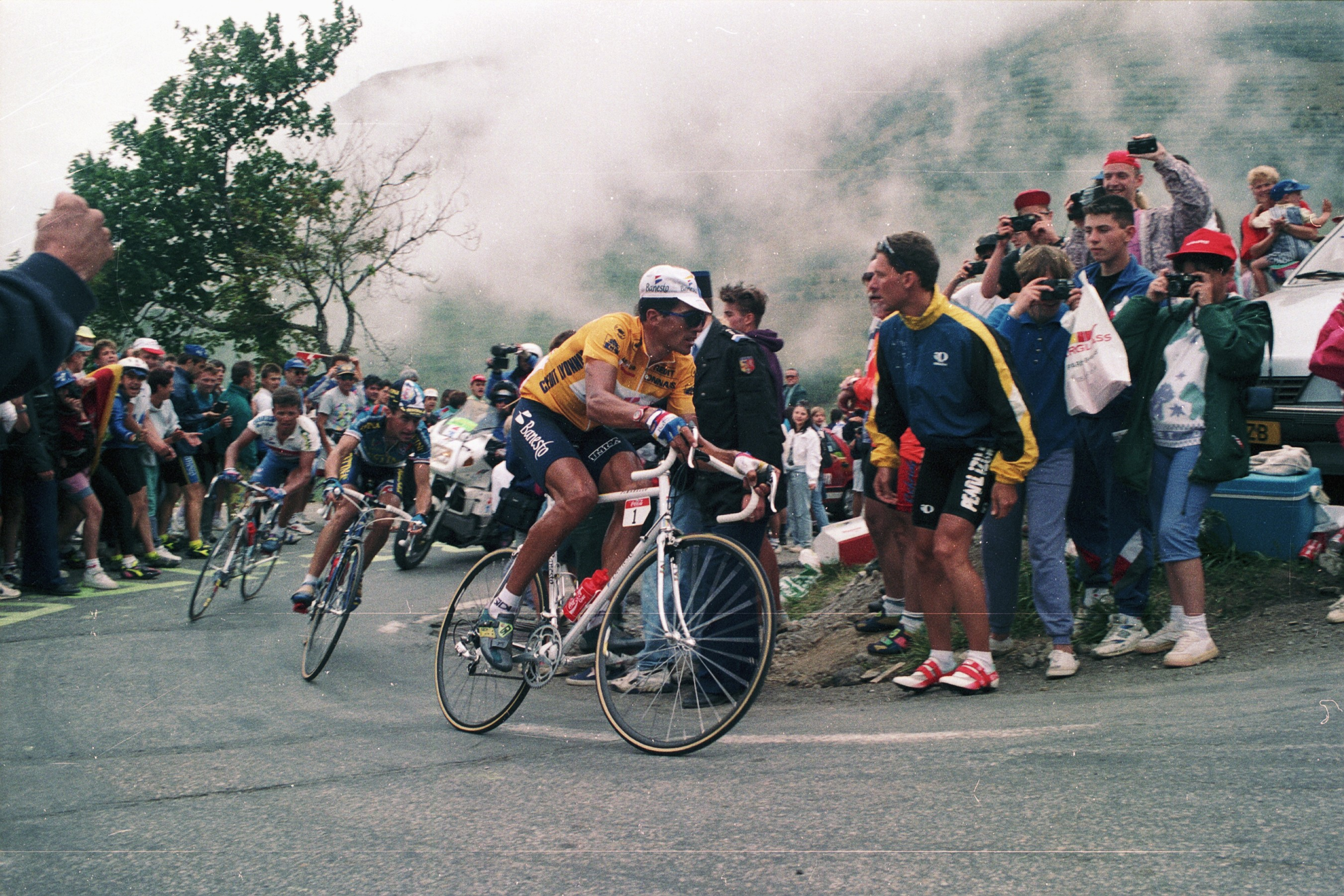
Miguel Induráin, wearing the yellow jersey as leader of the general classification, on stage 16's ascent to the finish at Alpe d'Huez

The 1994 edition of the Tour de France began with a brief 7.2 km (4.5 mi) prologue around the city of Lille. Englishman Chris Boardman set a blistering pace on the course en route to winning the stage by fifteen seconds over the second-place finisher Miguel Induráin. Stage 1 was a relatively flat stage that came down to a bunch sprint that was marred by a large crash. As the riders were sprinting to the finish line, a policeman leaned out to take a photograph causing Wilfried Nelissen to slam on his brakes and crash into the policeman while also taking out Laurent Jalabert in the process. Djamolidine Abdoujaparov ultimately won the stage while Jalabert and Nelissen were forced to drop out of the race due to the injuries they had sustained.

The Yellow Jersey switched riders multiple times through the first eight stages but in the Stage 9 individual time trial Indurain absolutely obliterated the entire field with only eight riders able to keep him within 6:00, and of those riders only Tony Rominger was able to keep Indurain within four minutes. Amazingly a young Lance Armstrong was able to hold onto a top 10 placing through Stage 10, but other than Rominger no one was in a position to threaten Indurain's lead.

As the race entered the Pyrenees in stages 11 and 12 Indurain built on his lead over Rominger who abandoned the Tour in Stage 13. As the race climbed Mont Ventoux and crossed the Alps Marco Pantani and Piotr Ugrumov began to climb through the top 10 as Richard Virenque held onto 2nd place, but Indurain's lead was secure with Virenque more than 7:00 behind.

In the final time trial in Stage 19 Ugrumov won the stage with Pantani coming in second both riders gaining considerable time on Indurain, but by the end of the day it was too little too late for both riders as Indurain's 4th consecutive Tour de France victory was all but secure as he held a commanding lead of 5:39 over the now 2nd place Ugrumov.

== Classification leadership and minor prizes ==
There were several classifications in the 1994 Tour de France. The most important was the general classification, calculated by adding each cyclist's finishing times on each stage. The cyclist with the least accumulated time was the race leader, identified by the yellow jersey; the winner of this classification is considered the winner of the Tour.

Additionally, there was a points classification, which awarded a green jersey. In the points classification, cyclists got points for finishing among the best in a stage finish, or in intermediate sprints. The cyclist with the most points lead the classification, and was identified with a green jersey.

There was also a mountains classification. The organisation had categorised some climbs as either hors catégorie, first, second, third, or fourth-category; points for this classification were won by the first cyclists that reached the top of these climbs first, with more points available for the higher-categorised climbs. The cyclist with the most points lead the classification, and wore a white jersey with red polka dots.

The fourth individual classification was the young rider classification, which was not marked by a jersey. This was decided the same way as the general classification, but only riders under 26 years were eligible.

For the team classification, the times of the best three cyclists per team on each stage were added; the leading team was the team with the lowest total time.

In addition, there was a combativity award given after each mass-start stage to the cyclist considered most combative. The decision was made by a jury composed of journalists who gave points. The cyclist with the most points from votes in all stages led the combativity classification. Eros Poli won this classification, and was given overall the super-combativity award. The Souvenir Henri Desgrange was given in honour of Tour founder Henri Desgrange to the first rider to pass the summit of the Col du Tourmalet on stage 12. This prize was won by Richard Virenque.

Classification leadership by stage
Stage	Winner	General classification	Points classification	Mountains classification	Young rider classification (Note: A white jersey was not awarded to the leader of the young rider classification between 1989 and 1999.)	Team classification	Combativity	
Stage	Winner	General classification	Points classification	Mountains classification	Young rider classification	Team classification	Award	Classification
P	Chris Boardman	Chris Boardman	Chris Boardman	not awarded	Eddy Seigneur	GAN	no award	
1	Djamolidine Abdoujaparov	Chris Boardman	Djamolidine Abdoujaparov	Jean-Paul van Poppel	Eddy Seigneur	GAN		
2	Jean-Paul van Poppel	Chris Boardman	Djamolidine Abdoujaparov	Peter De Clercq	Eddy Seigneur	GAN	Stephen Swart	Stephen Swart
3	GB-MG Maglifico	Johan Museeuw	Djamolidine Abdoujaparov	Peter De Clercq	Lance Armstrong	GB–MG Maglificio	no award	Stephen Swart
4	Francisco Cabello	Flavio Vanzella	Djamolidine Abdoujaparov	Peter De Clercq	Lance Armstrong	GB–MG Maglificio	Francisco Cabello	Francisco Cabello
5	Nicola Minali	Flavio Vanzella	Djamolidine Abdoujaparov	Peter De Clercq	Lance Armstrong	GB–MG Maglificio	Giancarlo Perini	Francisco Cabello
6	Gianluca Bortolami	Sean Yates	Djamolidine Abdoujaparov	Peter De Clercq	Lance Armstrong	Motorola		
7	Ján Svorada	Johan Museeuw	Djamolidine Abdoujaparov	Peter De Clercq	Lance Armstrong	Motorola	Eros Poli	Eros Poli
8	Bo Hamburger	Johan Museeuw	Djamolidine Abdoujaparov	Peter De Clercq	Lance Armstrong	Motorola	Luc Leblanc	Eros Poli
9	Miguel Induráin	Miguel Induráin	Djamolidine Abdoujaparov	Peter De Clercq	Abraham Olano	Mapei–CLAS	no award	Eros Poli
10	Jacky Durand	Miguel Induráin	Djamolidine Abdoujaparov	Peter De Clercq	Abraham Olano	Castorama	Gianluca Bortolami	Jacky Durand
11	Luc Leblanc	Miguel Induráin	Djamolidine Abdoujaparov	Peter De Clercq	Abraham Olano	Mapei–CLAS	Massimo Ghirotto	Jacky Durand
12	Richard Virenque	Miguel Induráin	Djamolidine Abdoujaparov	Richard Virenque	Richard Virenque	Festina–Lotus	Richard Virenque	Jacky Durand
13	Bjarne Riis	Miguel Induráin	Djamolidine Abdoujaparov	Richard Virenque	Richard Virenque	Festina–Lotus		
14	Rolf Sørensen	Miguel Induráin	Djamolidine Abdoujaparov	Richard Virenque	Richard Virenque	Festina–Lotus		
15	Eros Poli	Miguel Induráin	Djamolidine Abdoujaparov	Richard Virenque	Richard Virenque	Festina–Lotus	Eros Poli	Eros Poli
16	Roberto Conti	Miguel Induráin	Djamolidine Abdoujaparov	Richard Virenque	Richard Virenque	Festina–Lotus	Hernán Buenahora	Eros Poli
17	Nelson Rodríguez Serna	Miguel Induráin	Djamolidine Abdoujaparov	Richard Virenque	Richard Virenque	Festina–Lotus		Eros Poli
18	Piotr Ugrumov	Miguel Induráin	Djamolidine Abdoujaparov	Richard Virenque	Richard Virenque	Festina–Lotus	Piotr Ugrumov	Eros Poli
19	Piotr Ugrumov	Miguel Induráin	Djamolidine Abdoujaparov	Richard Virenque	Marco Pantani	Festina–Lotus	no award	Eros Poli
20	Djamolidine Abdoujaparov	Miguel Induráin	Djamolidine Abdoujaparov	Richard Virenque	Marco Pantani	Festina–Lotus		Eros Poli
21	Eddy Seigneur	Miguel Induráin	Djamolidine Abdoujaparov	Richard Virenque	Marco Pantani	Festina–Lotus		Eros Poli
Final		Miguel Induráin	Djamolidine Abdoujaparov	Richard Virenque	Marco Pantani	Festina–Lotus	Eros Poli	

- In stage 1, Miguel Induráin wore the green jersey.

== Final standings ==
Legend
Yellow jersey	Denotes the winner of the general classification	Polka dot jersey	Denotes the winner of the mountains classification
Green jersey	Denotes the winner of the points classification		

=== General classification ===
Final general classification (1–10)
Rank	Rider	Team	Time
1	Miguel Induráin (ESP)	Banesto	103h 38' 38"
2	Piotr Ugrumov (LAT)	Gewiss–Ballan	+ 5' 39"
3	Marco Pantani (ITA)	Carrera Jeans–Tassoni	+ 7' 19"
4	Luc Leblanc (FRA)	Festina–Lotus	+ 10' 03"
5	Richard Virenque (FRA)	Festina–Lotus	+ 10' 10"
6	Roberto Conti (ITA)	Lampre–Panaria	+ 12' 29"
7	Alberto Elli (ITA)	GB–MG Maglificio	+ 20' 17"
8	Alex Zülle (SUI)	ONCE	+ 20' 35"
9	Udo Bölts (GER)	Team Telekom	+ 25' 19"
10	Vladimir Poulnikov (UKR)	Carrera Jeans–Tassoni	+ 25' 28"

Final general classification (11–117)
Rank	Rider	Team	Time
11	Pascal Lino (FRA)	Festina–Lotus	+ 26' 01"
12	Fernando Escartín (ESP)	Mapei–CLAS	+ 30' 38"
13	Gianluca Bortolami (ITA)	Mapei–CLAS	+ 32' 35"
14	Bjarne Riis (DEN)	Gewiss–Ballan	+ 33' 32"
15	Oscar Pelliccioli (ITA)	Team Polti–Vaporetto	+ 34' 55"
16	Nelson Rodríguez (COL)	ZG Mobili	+ 35' 18"
17	Jean-François Bernard (FRA)	Banesto	+ 36' 44"
18	Hernán Buenahora (COL)	Kelme–Avianca–Gios	+ 38' 00"
19	Rolf Sørensen (DEN)	GB–MG Maglificio	+ 42' 39"
20	Bo Hamburger (DEN)	TVM–Bison Kit	+ 43' 44"
21	Thomas Davy (FRA)	Castorama	+ 46' 41"
22	Éric Caritoux (FRA)	Chazal–MBK	+ 47' 19"
23	Federico Muñoz (COL)	Kelme–Avianca–Gios	+ 48' 33"
24	Jim Van De Laer (BEL)	Lotto	+ 48' 35"
25	Bruno Cenghialta (ITA)	Gewiss–Ballan	+ 51' 30"
26	Charly Mottet (FRA)	Novemail–Histor–Laser Computer	+ 51' 44"
27	Beat Zberg (SUI)	Carrera Jeans–Tassoni	+ 57' 06"
28	Gerd Audehm (GER)	Team Telekom	+ 57' 44"
29	Erik Breukink (NED)	ONCE	+ 59' 55"
30	Abraham Olano (ESP)	Mapei–CLAS	+ 1h 01' 29"
31	Alvaro Mejia (COL)	Motorola	+ 1h 01' 43"
32	Ramon González (ESP)	Gewiss–Ballan	+ 1h 02' 40"
33	Pascal Hervé (FRA)	Festina–Lotus	+ 1h 07' 16"
34	Federico Echave (ESP)	Mapei–CLAS	+ 1h 07' 45"
35	Laurent Dufaux (SUI)	ONCE	+ 1h 09' 30"
36	Viatcheslav Ekimov (RUS)	WordPerfect–Colnago–Decca	+ 1h 09' 50"
37	Franco Vona (ITA)	GB–MG Maglificio	+ 1h 10' 41"
38	Rolf Aldag (GER)	Team Telekom	+ 1h 10' 59"
39	Enrico Zaina (ITA)	Gewiss–Ballan	+ 1h 12' 16"
40	Arsenio Gonzalez (ESP)	Mapei–CLAS	+ 1h 12' 41"
41	Flavio Vanzella (ITA)	GB–MG Maglificio	+ 1h 24' 05"
42	Franco Chioccioli (ITA)	Mercatone Uno–Medeghini	+ 1h 26' 52"
43	François Simon (FRA)	Castorama	+ 1h 30' 50"
44	Artūras Kasputis (LIT)	Chazal–MBK	+ 1h 37' 46"
45	Jesper Skibby (DEN)	TVM–Bison Kit	+ 1h 41' 21"
46	Davide Perona (ITA)	ZG Mobili	+ 1h 43' 05"
47	Jean-Claude Bagot (FRA)	Festina–Lotus	+ 1h 44' 06"
48	Miguel Arroyo (MEX)	Chazal–MBK	+ 1h 44' 11"
49	José Ramon Uriarte (ESP)	Gewiss–Ballan	+ 1h 44' 51"
50	Dag Otto Lauritzen (NOR)	TVM–Bison Kit	+ 1h 45' 54"
51	Eddy Seigneur (FRA)	GAN	+ 1h 47' 15"
52	Neil Stephens (AUS)	ONCE	+ 1h 47' 59"
53	Thierry Marie (FRA)	Castorama	+ 1h 48' 47"
54	Giancarlo Perini (ITA)	ZG Mobili	+ 1h 50' 07"
55	Angel Yesid Camargo (COL)	Kelme–Avianca–Gios	+ 1h 50' 08"
56	Gérard Rué (FRA)	Gewiss–Ballan	+ 1h 51' 28"
57	Djamolidine Abdoujaparov (UZB)	Team Polti–Vaporetto	+ 1h 51' 34"
58	Giorgio Furlan (ITA)	Gewiss–Ballan	+ 1h 52' 18"
59	Jörg Müller (SUI)	Mapei–CLAS	+ 1h 52' 19"
60	Jens Heppner (GER)	Team Telekom	+ 1h 53' 46"
61	Andrea Peron (ITA)	Team Polti–Vaporetto	+ 1h 53' 47"
62	Vladislav Bobrik (RUS)	Gewiss–Ballan	+ 1h 55' 12"
63	Serhiy Utchakov (UKR)	Team Polti–Vaporetto	+ 1h 57' 31"
64	Christophe Manin (FRA)	Chazal–MBK	+ 1h 58' 02"
65	Mauro-Antonio Santaromita (ITA)	ZG Mobili	+ 1h 58' 09"
66	Ronan Pensec (FRA)	Novemail–Histor–Laser Computer	+ 1h 59' 02"
67	Vicente Aparicio (ESP)	Gewiss–Ballan	+ 1h 59' 34"
68	Luc Roosen (BEL)	Lotto	+ 2h 00' 43"
69	Phil Anderson (AUS)	Motorola	+ 2h 01' 13"
70	Raúl Alcalá (MEX)	Motorola	+ 2h 04' 41"
71	Sean Yates (GBR)	Motorola	+ 2h 04' 45"
72	Dimitri Zhdanov (RUS)	Team Polti–Vaporetto	+ 2h 08' 20"
73	Rolf Järmann (SUI)	GB–MG Maglificio	+ 2h 10' 46"
74	Philippe Louviot (FRA)	Novemail–Histor–Laser Computer	+ 2h 12' 10"
75	Massimo Ghirotto (ITA)	ZG Mobili	+ 2h 12' 49"
76	Carlo Bomans (BEL)	GB–MG Maglificio	+ 2h 12' 55"
77	Gerrit de Vries (NED)	Novemail–Histor–Laser Computer	+ 2h 14' 53"
78	Thierry Gouvenou (FRA)	GAN	+ 2h 15' 23"
79	Atle Kvålsvoll (NOR)	WordPerfect–Colnago–Decca	+ 2h 15' 23"
80	Johan Museeuw (BEL)	GB–MG Maglificio	+ 2h 17' 26"
81	Pascal Chanteur (FRA)	Chazal–MBK	+ 2h 17' 36"
82	Peter De Clercq (BEL)	Lotto	+ 2h 21' 43"
83	Stephen Hodge (AUS)	Festina–Lotus	+ 2h 23' 50"
84	Uwe Raab (GER)	Team Telekom	+ 2h 24' 38"
85	Julio-César Cadena (COL)	Kelme–Avianca–Gios	+ 2h 24' 52"
86	Marco Zen (ITA)	Lampre–Panaria	+ 2h 25' 13"
87	Francisco Cabello (ESP)	Kelme–Avianca–Gios	+ 2h 25' 35"
88	Guy Nulens (BEL)	Novemail–Histor–Laser Computer	+ 2h 25' 52"
89	Frankie Andreu (USA)	Motorola	+ 2h 26' 24"
90	Guido Bontempi (ITA)	Gewiss–Ballan	+ 2h 26' 27"
91	Bruno Thibout (FRA)	Castorama	+ 2h 26' 42"
92	Marc Wauters (BEL)	WordPerfect–Colnago–Decca	+ 2h 28' 38"
93	Hendrik Redant (BEL)	ZG Mobili	+ 2h 28' 57"
94	Silvio Martinello (ITA)	Mercatone Uno–Medeghini	+ 2h 29' 04"
95	Melcior Mauri (ESP)	Gewiss–Ballan	+ 2h 30' 20"
96	Ángel Edo (ESP)	Kelme–Avianca–Gios	+ 2h 31' 01"
97	Mario Kummer (GER)	Team Telekom	+ 2h 31' 42"
98	Rudy Verdonck (BEL)	Lotto	+ 2h 32' 24"
99	Erwin Nijboer (NED)	Gewiss–Ballan	+ 2h 34' 27"
100	Cezary Zamana (POL)	Kelme–Avianca–Gios	+ 2h 34' 43"
101	Erik Dekker (NED)	WordPerfect–Colnago–Decca	+ 2h 34' 52"
102	Alberto Leanizbarrutia (ESP)	ONCE	+ 2h 36' 05"
103	Ján Svorada (SVK)	Lampre–Panaria	+ 2h 36' 25"
104	Michel Dernies (BEL)	Motorola	+ 2h 36' 31"
105	Olaf Ludwig (GER)	Team Telekom	+ 2h 37' 37"
106	Christian Henn (GER)	Team Telekom	+ 2h 37' 48"
107	Dario Bottaro (ITA)	Gewiss–Ballan	+ 2h 39' 17"
108	Davide Cassani (ITA)	GB–MG Maglificio	+ 2h 41' 32"
109	Herminio Diaz (ESP)	ONCE	+ 2h 42' 06"
110	Giovanni Fidanza (ITA)	Team Polti–Vaporetto	+ 2h 42' 47"
111	Remo Rossi (ITA)	Carrera Jeans–Tassoni	+ 2h 43' 51"
112	Stephen Swart (NZL)	Motorola	+ 2h 44' 38"
113	Francis Moreau (FRA)	GAN	+ 2h 51' 13"
114	Mario Chiesa (ITA)	Carrera Jeans–Tassoni	+ 2h 52' 02"
115	Eros Poli (ITA)	Mercatone Uno–Medeghini	+ 2h 52' 41"
116	Rob Mulders (NED)	WordPerfect–Colnago–Decca	+ 3h 08' 32"
117	John Talen (NED)	Mercatone Uno–Medeghini	+ 3h 39' 03"

=== Points classification ===
Final points classification (1–10)
Rank	Rider	Team	Points
1	Djamolidine Abdoujaparov (UZB)	Team Polti–Vaporetto	322
2	Silvio Martinello (ITA)	Mercatone Uno–Medeghini	273
3	Ján Svorada (SVK)	Lampre–Panaria	230
4	Gianluca Bortolami (ITA)	Mapei–CLAS	188
5	Miguel Induráin (ESP)	Banesto	132
6	Olaf Ludwig (GER)	Team Telekom	122
7	Johan Museeuw (BEL)	GB–MG Maglificio	118
8	François Simon (FRA)	Castorama	105
9	Luc Leblanc (FRA)	Festina–Lotus	103
10	Ángel Edo (ESP)	Kelme–Avianca–Gios	102

=== Mountains classification ===
Final mountains classification (1–10)
Rank	Rider	Team	Points
1	Richard Virenque (FRA)	Festina–Lotus	392
2	Marco Pantani (ITA)	Carrera Jeans–Tassoni	243
3	Piotr Ugrumov (LAT)	Gewiss–Ballan	219
4	Miguel Induráin (ESP)	Banesto	215
5	Peter De Clercq (BEL)	Lotto	192
6	Luc Leblanc (FRA)	Festina–Lotus	176
7	Oscar Pelliccioli (ITA)	Team Polti–Vaporetto	151
8	Roberto Conti (ITA)	Lampre–Panaria	147
9	Nelson Rodríguez (COL)	ZG Mobili	142
10	Udo Bölts (GER)	Team Telekom	119

=== Young rider classification ===
Final young rider classification (1–10)
Rank	Rider	Team	Time
1	Marco Pantani (ITA)	Carrera Jeans–Tassoni	103h 45' 57"
2	Richard Virenque (FRA)	Festina–Lotus	+ 2' 51"
3	Bo Hamburger (DEN)	TVM–Bison Kit	+ 36' 25"
4	Beat Zberg (SUI)	Carrera Jeans–Tassoni	+ 49' 17"
5	Abraham Olano (ESP)	Mapei–CLAS	+ 54' 10"
6	Laurent Dufaux (SUI)	ONCE	+ 1h 02' 11"
7	Eddy Seigneur (FRA)	GAN	+ 1h 39' 56"
8	Andrea Peron (ITA)	Team Polti–Vaporetto	+ 1h 46' 28"
9	Vladislav Bobrik (RUS)	Gewiss–Ballan	+ 1h 47' 53"
10	Vicente Aparicio (ESP)	Banesto	+ 1h 52' 15"

=== Team classification ===
Final team classification (1–10)
Rank	Team	Time
1	Festina–Lotus	311h 28' 53"
2	Gewiss–Ballan	+ 42' 57"
3	Mapei–CLAS	+ 44' 38"
4	Banesto	+ 48' 25"
5	Carrera Jeans–Tassoni	+ 50' 55"
6	GB–MG Maglificio	+ 1h 06' 06"
7	ONCE	+ 1h 20' 47"
8	Team Telekom	+ 1h 51' 04"
9	Kelme–Avianca–Gios	+ 1h 55' 47"
10	Castorama	+ 2h 14' 58"

=== Combativity classification ===
Final combativity classification (1–3)
Rank	Rider	Team	Points
1	Eros Poli (ITA)	Mercatone Uno–Medeghini	34
2	Marco Pantani (ITA)	Carrera Jeans–Tassoni	32
3	Piotr Ugrumov (LAT)	Gewiss–Ballan	21

== Bibliography ==
- Augendre, Jacques (2016). Guide historique [Historical guide] (PDF) (in French). Paris: Amaury Sport Organisation. Archived (PDF) from the original on 17 August 2016.
- McGann, Bill; McGann, Carol (2008). The Story of the Tour de France: 1965–2007. Vol. 2. Indianapolis: Dog Ear Publishing. ISBN 978-1-59858-608-4.
- Nauright, John; Parrish, Charles (2012). Sports Around the World: History, Culture, and Practice. Vol. 2. Santa Barbara, California: ABC-CLIO. ISBN 978-1-59884-300-2.
- van den Akker, Pieter (2018). Tour de France Rules and Statistics: 1903–2018. Self-published. ISBN 978-1-79398-080-9.
