= Gérard Guazzini =

French cyclist

Personal information
- Born: 11 September 1966 (age 60) Martigues, France

Cycling career
- Sport: Cycling
- Role: Rider

Gérard Guazzini (born 11 September 1966) is a French former professional racing cyclist. He rode the 1994 Tour de France.
