= Rob Mulders =

Dutch cyclist

Personal information
- Born: 7 April 1967 Well, Limburg, Netherlands
- Died: 29 January 1998 (aged 30) Apeldoorn, Netherlands

Cycling career
- Sport: Cycling
- Discipline: Road
- Role: Rider

Professional teams
- 1990: Panasonic–Sportlife
- 1991–1995: Buckler–Colnago–Decca
- 1996: Collstrop–Lystex

Rob Mulders (7 April 1967 – 29 January 1998) was a Dutch road racing cyclist, who was a professional from 1991 to 1996. He twice rode the Tour de France, in 1993 and 1994. Born in Well, Limburg, Mulders' biggest success was winning Veenendaal–Veenendaal in 1993. Five years later he died in a car crash near Apeldoorn.

== Major results ==
1989
2nd Dorpenomloop Rucphen
1990
2nd Ronde van Drenthe
2nd Omloop der Kempen
3rd Hel van het Mergelland
3rd Ster van Zwolle
1991
1st Omloop der Kempen
1st Stage 9 Olympia's Tour
2nd Rund um Köln
2nd Hel van het Mergelland
2nd Ronde van Noord-Holland
1992
8th Overall Étoile de Bessèges
10th Grote Prijs Jef Scherens
1993
1st Veenendaal–Veenendaal
1st Circuit des Frontières
1st Stage 6 Vuelta a Asturias

=== Grand Tour general classification results timeline ===
Grand Tour	1992	1993	1994	1995
Giro d'Italia	—	—	—	—
Tour de France	—	134	116	—
Vuelta a España	117	—	—	DNF

Legend
—	Did not compete
DNF	Did not finish
