= Rosario Fina =

Italian cyclist

Personal information
- Born: 23 March 1969 (age 57) San Cataldo, Sicily, Italy

Cycling career
- Sport: Cycling
- Discipline: Road
- Role: Rider

Professional teams
- 1994–1995: Mercatone Uno–Medeghini
- 1996: Gewiss Playbus

Rosario Fina (born 23 March 1969) is an Italian former professional racing cyclist. He rode in two editions of the Tour de France and one edition of the Vuelta a España.

== Major results ==
1987
1st Team time trial, UCI Junior World Road Championships
1991
1st Coppa San Geo
1st Giro delle Valli Aretine
1992
2nd Time trial, National Amateur Road Championships
1993
1st Team time trial, UCI Road World Championships
1st Freccia dei Vini
2nd Overall Giro della Valle d'Aosta

1st Stage 1

2nd GP Industria Artigianato e Commercio Carnaghese
1994
2nd Time trial, National Road Championships
1995
8th Firenze–Pistoia
1996
1st Stage 1 Vuelta a Aragón
