= Remo Rossi (cyclist) =

Italian cyclist

Personal information
- Born: 10 April 1968 (age 58) Grezzana, Italy

Cycling career
- Sport: Cycling
- Role: Rider

Remo Rossi (born 10 April 1968) is an Italian former professional racing cyclist. He rode in the 1993 and 1994 Tour de France.
