= Marco Zen =

Italian cyclist

Personal information
- Born: 2 January 1963 (age 63) Bassano del Grappa, Italy

Cycling career
- Sport: Cycling
- Role: Rider

Marco Zen (born 2 January 1963) is an Italian former professional racing cyclist. He rode in three editions of the Tour de France.
