= Oscar Pelliccioli =

Italian cyclist

Oscar Pellicioli
Personal information
- Full name: Oscar Pellicioli
- Born: 1 July 1965 (age 61) Verdellino, Italy
- Height: 1.64 m (5 ft 4 1/2 in)
- Weight: 54 kg (119 lb; 8 st 7 lb)

Cycling career
- Sport: Cycling
- Discipline: Road
- Role: Rider, directeur sportif

Amateur teams
- 1988: Passerini Gum–Thermobus–De Rosa
- 1989: Bresciaplast–Remac

Professional team
- 1990–1991: Diana–Colnago–Animex
- 1992–1993: Gatorade–Chateau d'Ax
- 1994–1995: Team Polti–Vaporetto
- 1996: Carrera Jeans–Tassoni
- 1997–1998: Mercatone Uno
- 1999–2000: Team Polti

Managerial teams
- 2003–2005: Domina Vacanze
- 2006–2009: Team Milram
- 2012–2015: Colombia–Coldeportes

Oscar Pellicioli (born 1 July 1965) is an Italian former professional road cyclist and manager. He was born in Verdellino.

He was the manager of Team Milram until 2009. In 2012, he became an assistant team manager of the Pro Continental team Colombia–Coldeportes.

== Major results ==
1989
3rd GP Capodarco
1994
1st Coppa Ugo Agostoni
1st Stage 6 Tour DuPont
4th Subida a Urkiola
5th Trofeo Matteotti
5th GP Industria & Commercio di Prato
6th Tour du Haut Var
6th Tre Valli Varesine
10th Road race, National Road Championships
10th G.P. Camaiore
10th Giro del Veneto
1995
1st Trofeo dello Scalatore
6th Japan Cup
7th Giro dell'Appennino
7th Milano–Torino
8th Overall Tour de Romandie
1996
3rd Giro della Romagna
3rd Subida a Urkiola
1997
6th Tour de Berne
1998
3rd Grand Prix de Fourmies
5th GP Industria & Commercio di Prato
7th Subida a Urkiola
2000
7th Subida al Naranco

=== Grand Tour general classification results timeline ===
Grand Tour	1991	1992	1993	1994	1995	1996	1997	1998	1999	2000
Giro d'Italia	DNF	—	50	25	DNF	23	39	—	76	55
Tour de France	—	—	—	15	32	85	80	—	DNF	—
Vuelta a España	—	95	—	—	24	—	—	—	—	108

Legend
—	Did not compete
DNF	Did not finish
