= Davide Perona =

Italian cyclist

Personal information
- Born: 4 June 1968 (age 58) Verzuolo, Italy

Cycling career
- Sport: Cycling
- Role: Rider

Davide Perona (born 4 June 1968) is an Italian former professional racing cyclist. He rode in three editions of the Tour de France and three editions of the Giro d'Italia. In 1990 he won Coppa Città di San Daniele.
