= Flavio Vanzella =

Italian cyclist (born 1964)

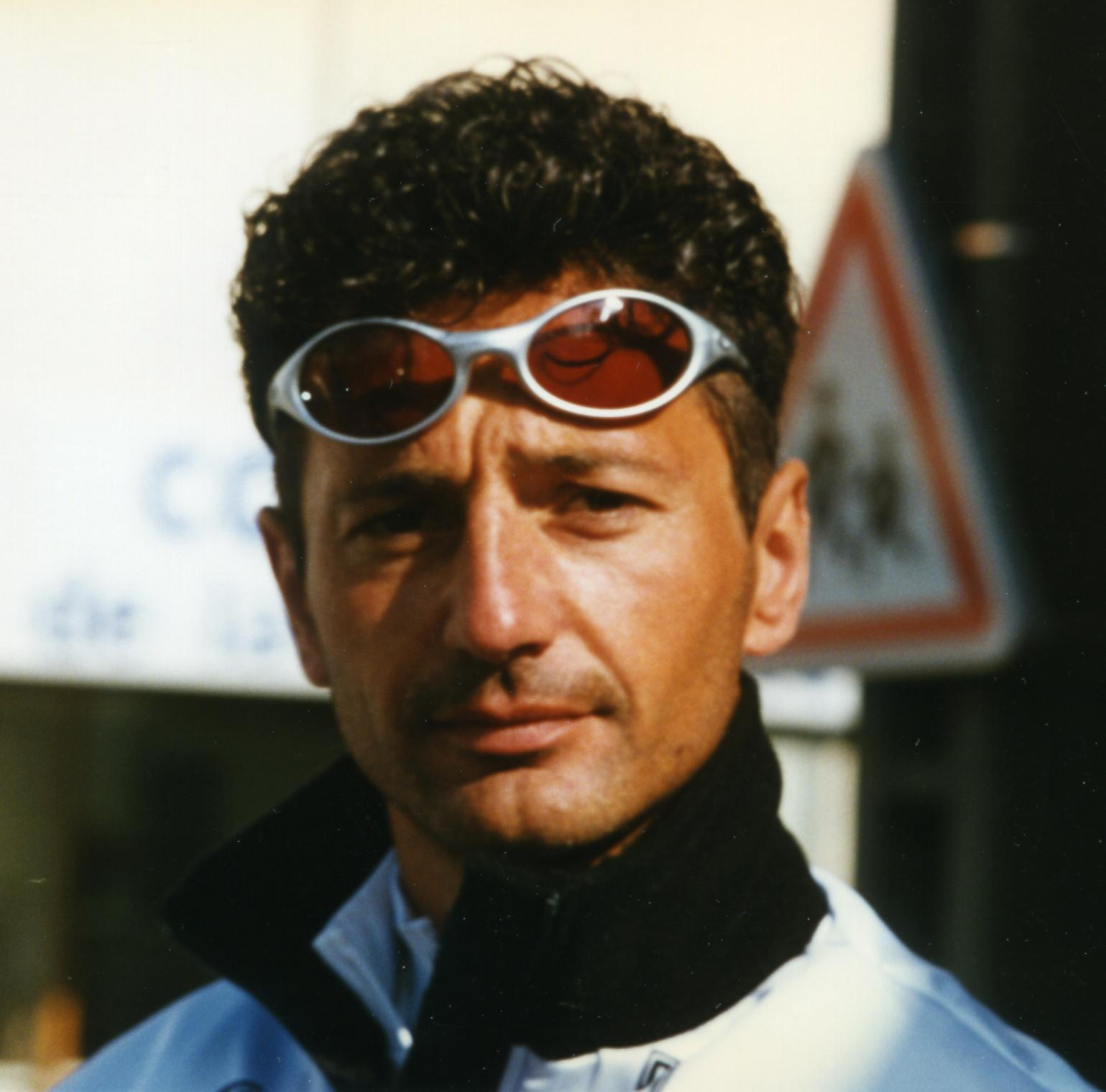

Personal information
- Full name: Flavio Vanzella
- Born: 4 March 1964 (age 62) Vazzola, Italy
- Height: 1.84 m (6 ft 1/2 in)
- Weight: 78 kg (172 lb; 12 st 4 lb)

Cycling career
- Sport: Cycling
- Discipline: Road
- Role: Rider

Major wins
- Giro del Veneto

Flavio Vanzella (born 4 March 1964) is a former Italian professional road bicycle racer. He was professional in 1989 to 1998. He won 3 victories. In the 1994 Tour de France he wore the yellow jersey for 2 days. Other victories included a stage win in the Euskal Bizikleta, a stage win in the 1995 Tour de Suisse and the Giro del Veneto. He also competed in the team time trial at the 1988 Summer Olympics.

== Palmarès ==
1986
Regio-Tour
1987
World Championship, Road, 100 km team time trial for amateurs (with Roberto Fortunato, Eros Poli and Mario Scirea)
1994
Tour de France:

Wearing yellow jersey for two days

1995
Giro del Veneto
