= Thierry Gouvenou =

French cyclist

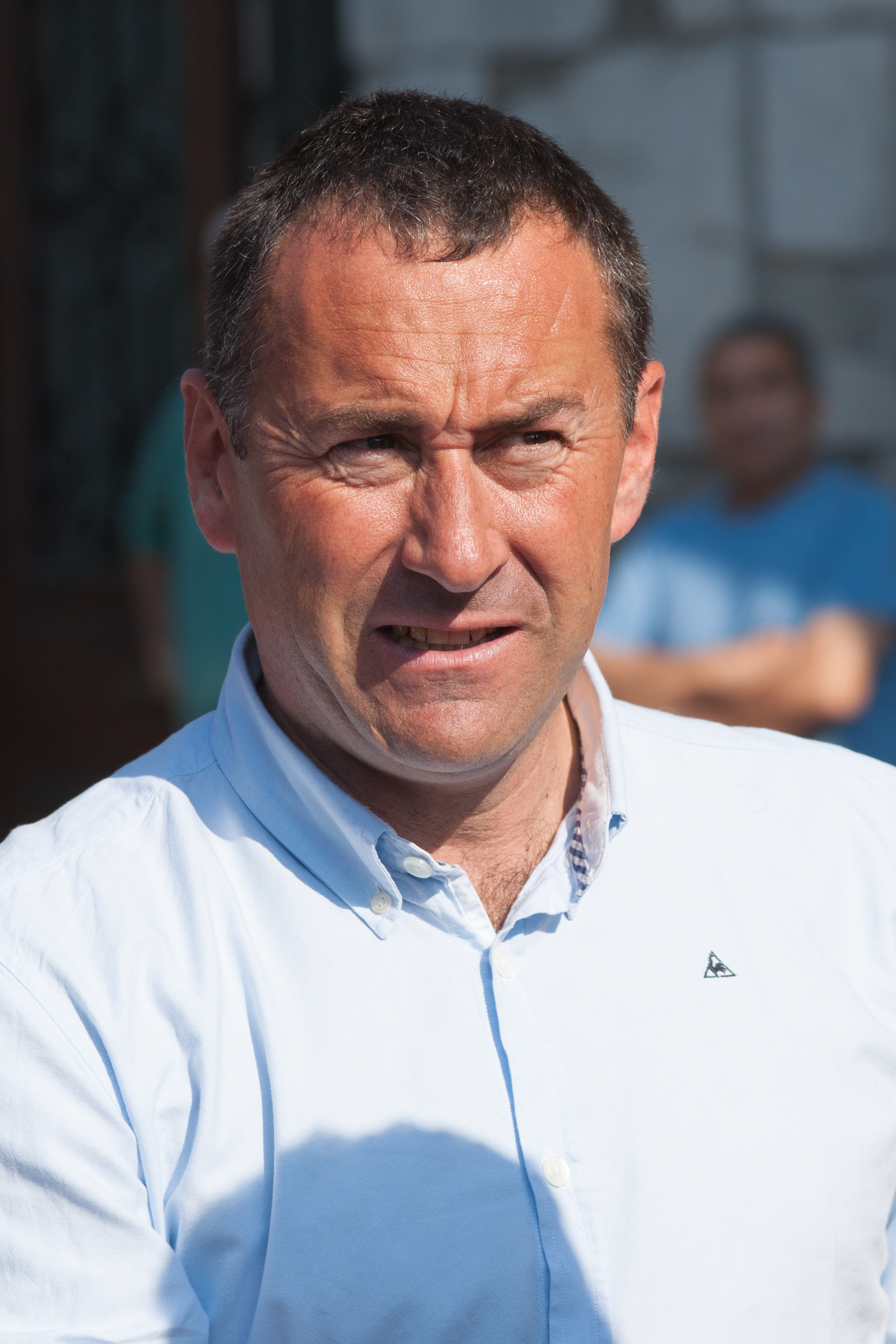
- Thierry Gouvenou in 2014

Personal information
- Born: 14 May 1969 (age 57) Vire, France

Cycling career
- Sport: Cycling
- Discipline: Road
- Role: Rider

Amateur team
- 1990: Z–Tomasso (stagiaire)

Professional teams
- 1991–1995: Z
- 1996–2002: Aubervilliers 93

Thierry Gouvenou (born 14 May 1969) is a French former professional racing cyclist. He rode in seven editions of the Tour de France and one each of the Vuelta a España and the Giro d'Italia.

Since 2014, Gouvenou has worked as a lead course designer of the Tour de France.

== Career achievements ==
=== Major results ===
1990
1st Paris–Roubaix Espoirs
1991
9th Omloop Het Volk
1992
10th Overall Étoile de Bessèges
1993
10th Omloop Het Volk
1994
10th Kuurne–Brussels–Kuurne
1995
3rd GP de Denain
1997
7th Overall Tour de Normandie
1998
3rd Overall Tour de Normandie

1st Stage 4

1999
3rd Overall Tour de Normandie
10th GP de la Ville de Rennes
2001
10th Tro-Bro Léon
2002
3rd Polynormande
7th Paris–Roubaix
10th Paris–Camembert

=== Grand Tour general classification results timeline ===
Grand Tour	1992	1993	1994	1995	1996	1997	1998	1999	2000	2001
Giro d'Italia	90	—	—	—	—	—	—	—	—	—
Tour de France	—	—	78	DNF	114	88	59	96	—	131
Vuelta a España	—	—	—	97	—	—	—	—	—	—

Legend
DSQ	Disqualified
DNF	Did not finish
