= Nelson Rodríguez Serna =

Colombian cyclist

Nelson Rodríguez
Personal information
- Full name: Nelson Rodríguez Serna
- Nickname: Cacaíto
- Born: 16 November 1965 (age 60) Manizales, Caldas, Colombia

Cycling career
- Sport: Cycling
- Current team: Retired
- Discipline: Road
- Role: Rider

Professional teams
- 1989–1990: Kelme
- 1991: Pony Malta-Avianca
- 1992–1995: ZG Mobili
- 1996: Glacial-Selle Italia

Major wins
- Tour de France, 1 stage

Nelson Rodríguez Serna (born 16 November 1965) is a Colombian former road bicycle racer. He won a stage in 1994 Tour de France. He also competed in the road race at the 1988 Summer Olympics. Rodríguez was born in Manizales, Caldas, Colombia.

== Major results ==
1992
Vuelta al Tachira: winner stage 5
1993
Vuelta al Tachira: winner stage 6
1994
Tour de France:

Winner stage 17

Giro d'Italia:

6th place overall classification
