= Thomas Davy (cyclist) =

French cyclist

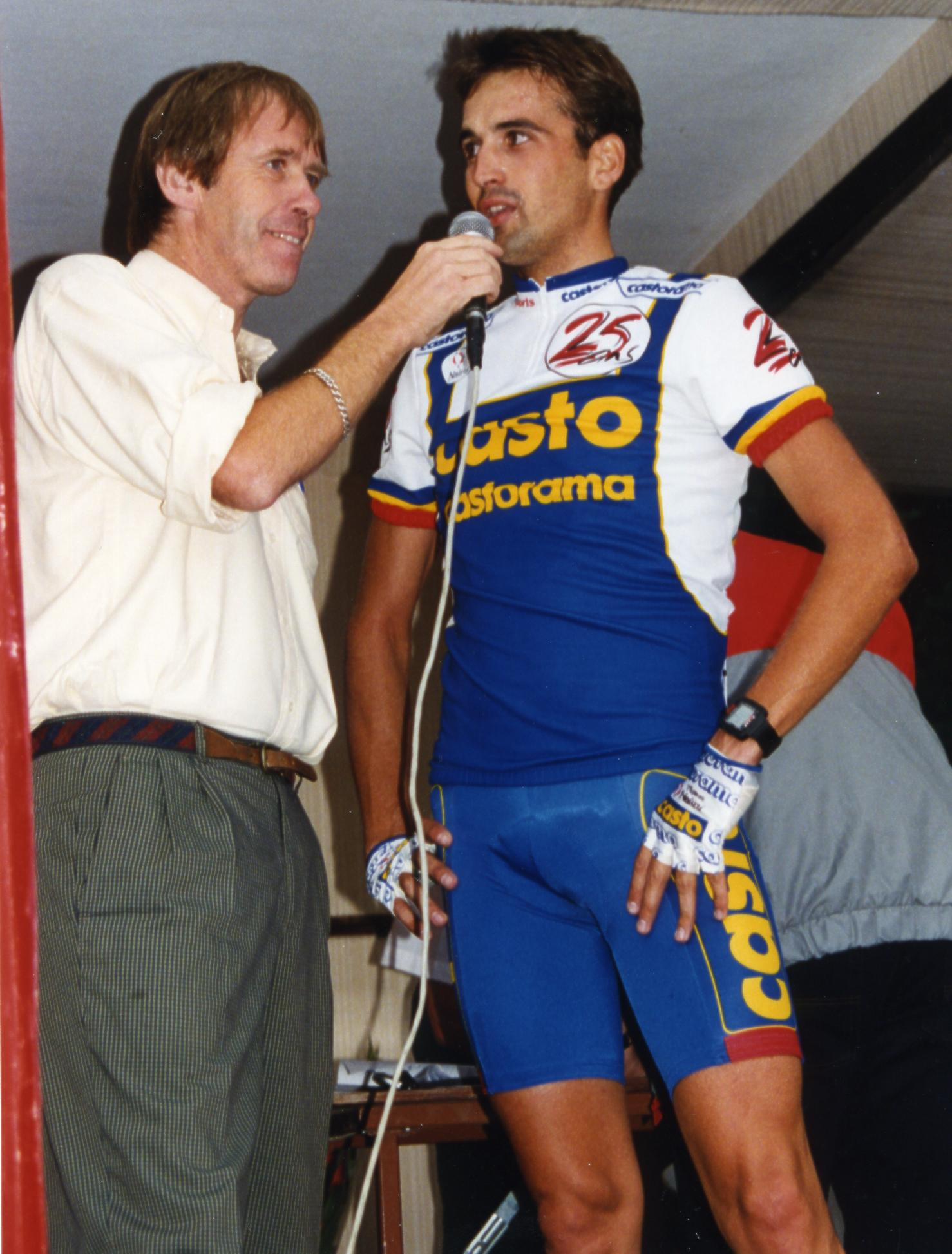

Personal information
- Born: 1 May 1968 (age 58) Paris, France

Cycling career
- Sport: Cycling
- Current team: Retired
- Discipline: Road
- Role: Rider

Amateur team
- 1991: U.S. Montauban

Professional teams
- 1992–1994: Castorama
- 1995–1996: Banesto
- 1997: Française des Jeux

Major wins
- Tour de l'Avenir (1993)

Thomas Davy (born 1 May 1968, in Paris) is a French former road cyclist. He turned professional in 1992 and ended his cycling career five years later in 1997.

== Major results ==
1991
1st Road race, National Amateur Road Championships
1992
1st Stage 12 Tour de l'Avenir
1993
1st Overall Tour de l'Avenir
1994
1st Stage 4 Circuit de la Sarthe
2nd Polynormande
4th GP de la Ville de Rennes
1995
9th Overall Circuit de la Sarthe

=== Grand Tour general classification results timeline ===
Grand Tour	1992	1993	1994	1995
Giro d'Italia	73	—	40	33
Tour de France	—	—	21	80
Vuelta a España	—	—	—	—
