= Christophe Manin =

French cyclist

Personal information
- Born: 12 July 1966 (age 60)

Cycling career
- Sport: Cycling
- Discipline: Road
- Role: Rider

Professional teams
- 1989–1992: RMO
- 1993: Motorola
- 1994–1995: Chazal–MBK

Christophe Manin (born 12 July 1966 in Saint-Marcellin, Isère) is a French former professional racing cyclist. He rode in two editions of the Tour de France, one edition of the Vuelta a España and two editions of the Giro d'Italia. Among his most notable results were a stage win in the 1988 edition of the Critérium du Dauphiné Libéré and a fifth place overall in the 1992 Paris–Nice. In June 2017 Manin was announced as the national technical director for the French Cycling Federation.

== Major results ==
1987
3rd Paris–Troyes
1988
1st Stage 2 Critérium du Dauphiné Libéré
1990
3rd Road race, National Road Championships
1991
2nd Overall Tour du Poitou Charentes et de la Vienne
4th GP de la Ville de Rennes
1992
3rd Overall Giro di Puglia
3rd Trofeo Pantalica
5th Overall Paris–Nice
1994
7th Overall Étoile de Bessèges
1995
6th GP de la Ville de Rennes
10th Overall Étoile de Bessèges
