= 1995 Tour de France, Stage 11 to Stage 20 =

Cycling race stages

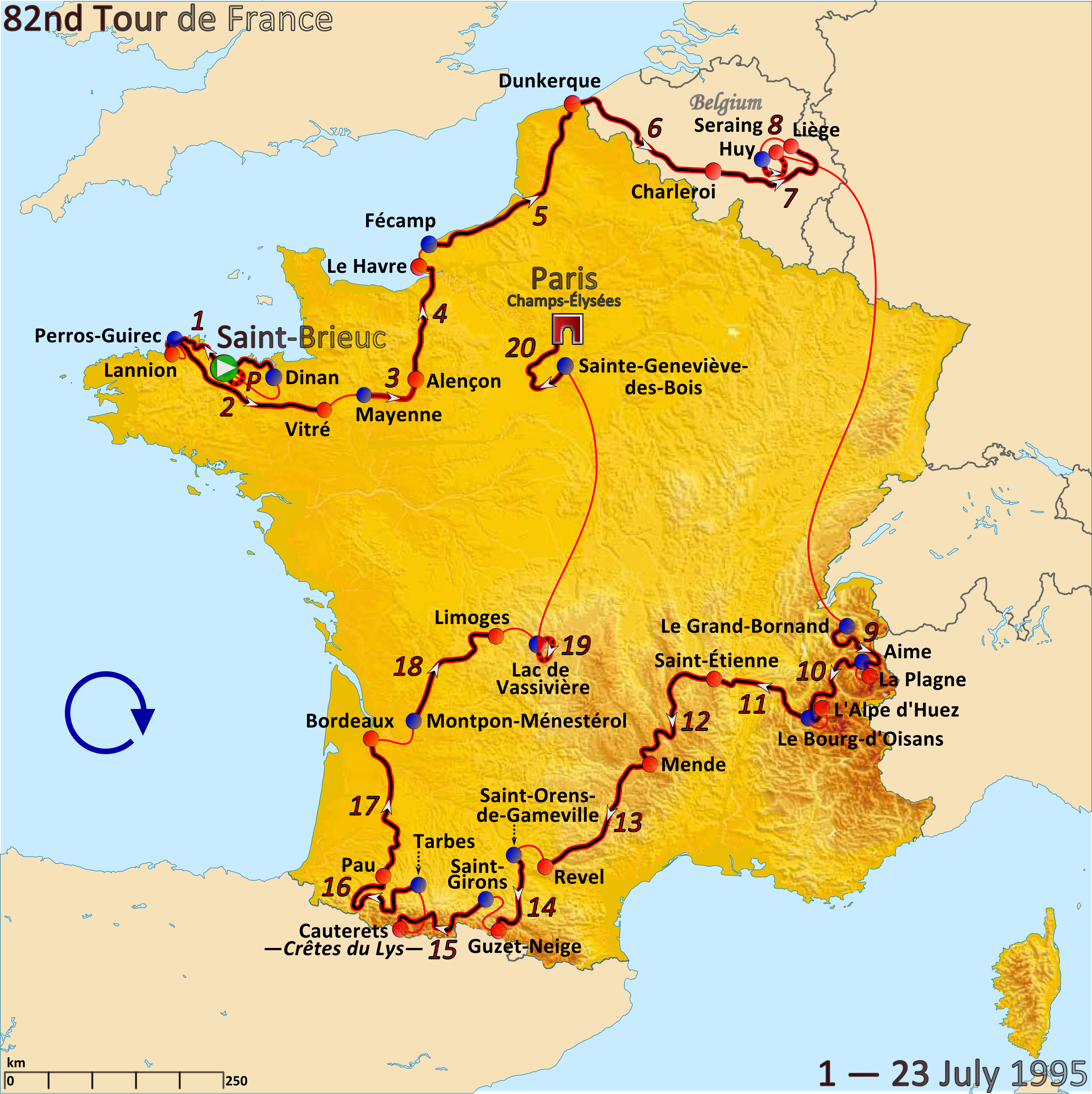
Route of the 1995 Tour de France

The 1995 Tour de France was the 82nd edition of Tour de France, one of cycling's Grand Tours. The Tour began in Saint-Brieuc with a prologue individual time trial on 1 July and Stage 11 occurred on 13 July with a hilly stage from Le Bourg-d'Oisans. The race finished on the Champs-Élysées in Paris on 23 July.

== Stage 11 ==
13 July 1995 — Le Bourg-d'Oisans to Saint-Étienne, 199 km (123.7 mi)

Stage 11 result

Rank	Rider	Team	Time
1	Max Sciandri (GBR)	MG Maglificio–Technogym	4h 43' 15"
2	Hernán Buenahora (COL)	Kelme–Avianca	s.t.
3	Rolf Aldag (GER)	Team Telekom/ZG Mobili–Selle Italia	+ 2' 48"
4	Andrea Tafi (ITA)	Mapei–GB–Latexco	+ 2' 48"
5	Erik Breukink (NED)	ONCE	+ 2' 50"
6	Armand de Las Cuevas (FRA)	Castorama	+ 5' 31"
7	Laurent Jalabert (FRA)	ONCE	+ 5' 52"
8	Djamolidine Abdoujaparov (UZB)	Novell–Decca–Colnago	+ 5' 52"
9	Viatcheslav Ekimov (RUS)	Novell–Decca–Colnago	+ 5' 52"
10	Vladimir Poulnikov (UKR)	Team Telekom/ZG Mobili–Selle Italia	+ 5' 52"

General classification after stage 11

Rank	Rider	Team	Time
1	Miguel Induráin (ESP)	Banesto	47h 22' 05"
2	Alex Zülle (SUI)	ONCE	+ 2' 27"
3	Bjarne Riis (DEN)	Gewiss–Ballan	+ 6' 00"
4	Tony Rominger (SUI)	Mapei–GB–Latexco	+ 8' 19"
5	Ivan Gotti (ITA)	Gewiss–Ballan	+ 8' 20"
6	Laurent Jalabert (FRA)	ONCE	+ 9' 16"
7	Marco Pantani (ITA)	Carrera Jeans–Tassoni	+ 12' 38"
8	Melcior Mauri (ESP)	ONCE	+ 12' 49"
9	Pavel Tonkov (RUS)	Lampre–Panaria	+ 12' 58"
10	Fernando Escartín (ESP)	Mapei–GB–Latexco	+ 13' 43"

== Stage 12 ==
14 July 1995 — Saint-Étienne to Mende, 222 km (137.9 mi)

Stage 12 result

Rank	Rider	Team	Time
1	Laurent Jalabert (FRA)	ONCE	5h 19' 05"
2	Massimo Podenzana (ITA)	Brescialat–Fago	+ 29"
3	Dario Bottaro (ITA)	Gewiss–Ballan	+ 42"
4	Melcior Mauri (ESP)	ONCE	+ 48"
5	Andrea Peron (ITA)	Motorola	+ 1' 30"
6	Marco Pantani (ITA)	Carrera Jeans–Tassoni	+ 5' 41"
7	Bjarne Riis (DEN)	Gewiss–Ballan	+ 5' 41"
8	Miguel Induráin (ESP)	Banesto	+ 5' 41"
9	Alex Zülle (SUI)	ONCE	+ 5' 58"
10	Laurent Brochard (FRA)	Festina–Lotus	+ 5' 58"

General classification after stage 12

Rank	Rider	Team	Time
1	Miguel Induráin (ESP)	Banesto	52h 46' 51"
2	Alex Zülle (SUI)	ONCE	+ 2' 44"
3	Laurent Jalabert (FRA)	ONCE	+ 3' 35"
4	Bjarne Riis (DEN)	Gewiss–Ballan	+ 6' 00"
5	Melcior Mauri (ESP)	ONCE	+ 7' 56"
6	Tony Rominger (SUI)	Mapei–GB–Latexco	+ 8' 56"
7	Ivan Gotti (ITA)	Gewiss–Ballan	+ 8' 57"
8	Marco Pantani (ITA)	Carrera Jeans–Tassoni	+ 12' 38"
9	Fernando Escartín (ESP)	Mapei–GB–Latexco	+ 14' 20"
10	Claudio Chiappucci (ITA)	Carrera Jeans–Tassoni	+ 14' 59"

== Stage 13 ==
15 July 1995 — Mende to Revel, 245 km (152 mi)

Stage 13 result

Rank	Rider	Team	Time
1	Serguei Outschakov (UKR)	Polti–Granarolo–Santini	5h 50' 45"
2	Lance Armstrong (USA)	Motorola	s.t.
3	Bruno Cenghialta (ITA)	Gewiss–Ballan	+ 59"
4	Hernán Buenahora (COL)	Kelme–Avianca	+ 59"
5	Davide Perona (ITA)	Lampre–Panaria	+ 12' 37"
6	Marco Milesi (ITA)	Brescialat–Fago	+ 12' 37"
7	Frankie Andreu (USA)	Motorola	+ 12' 37"
8	Bo Hamburger (DEN)	TVM–Polis Direct	+ 15' 08"
9	Viatcheslav Ekimov (RUS)	Novell–Decca–Colnago	+ 15' 08"
10	Bart Voskamp (NED)	TVM–Polis Direct	+ 16' 16"

General classification after stage 13

Rank	Rider	Team	Time
1	Miguel Induráin (ESP)	Banesto	58h 56' 50"
2	Alex Zülle (SUI)	ONCE	+ 2' 44"
3	Laurent Jalabert (FRA)	ONCE	+ 3' 35"
4	Bjarne Riis (DEN)	Gewiss–Ballan	+ 6' 00"
5	Melcior Mauri (ESP)	ONCE	+ 7' 56"
6	Tony Rominger (SUI)	Mapei–GB–Latexco	+ 8' 56"
7	Ivan Gotti (ITA)	Gewiss–Ballan	+ 8' 57"
8	Marco Pantani (ITA)	Carrera Jeans–Tassoni	+ 12' 38"
9	Hernán Buenahora (COL)	Kelme–Avianca	+ 13' 55"
10	Fernando Escartín (ESP)	Mapei–GB–Latexco	+ 14' 20"

== Stage 14 ==
16 July 1995 — Saint-Orens-de-Gameville to Guzet-Neige, 164 km (102 mi)

Stage 14 result

Rank	Rider	Team	Time
1	Marco Pantani (ITA)	Carrera Jeans–Tassoni	4h 29' 08"
2	Laurent Madouas (FRA)	Castorama	+ 2' 31"
3	Miguel Induráin (ESP)	Banesto	+ 2' 31"
4	Alex Zülle (SUI)	ONCE	+ 2' 33"
5	Ivan Gotti (ITA)	Gewiss–Ballan	+ 2' 35"
6	Bjarne Riis (DEN)	Gewiss–Ballan	+ 2' 35"
7	Laurent Jalabert (FRA)	ONCE	+ 3' 24"
8	Richard Virenque (FRA)	Festina–Lotus	+ 3' 24"
9	Claudio Chiappucci (ITA)	Carrera Jeans–Tassoni	+ 3' 24"
10	Paolo Lanfranchi (ITA)	Brescialat–Fago	+ 3' 26"

General classification after stage 14

Rank	Rider	Team	Time
1	Miguel Induráin (ESP)	Banesto	63h 28' 29"
2	Alex Zülle (SUI)	ONCE	+ 2' 46"
3	Laurent Jalabert (FRA)	ONCE	+ 4' 28"
4	Bjarne Riis (DEN)	Gewiss–Ballan	+ 6' 04"
5	Ivan Gotti (ITA)	Gewiss–Ballan	+ 9' 01"
6	Melcior Mauri (ESP)	ONCE	+ 9' 24"
7	Marco Pantani (ITA)	Carrera Jeans–Tassoni	+ 10' 07"
8	Tony Rominger (SUI)	Mapei–GB–Latexco	+ 12' 03"
9	Fernando Escartín (ESP)	Mapei–GB–Latexco	+ 15' 17"
10	Hernán Buenahora (COL)	Kelme–Avianca	+ 15' 23"

== Stage 15 ==
18 July 1995 — Saint-Girons to Cauterets, 206 km (128 mi)

On the descent of the Col de Portet d'Aspet, Fabio Casartelli crashed into concrete blocks at the roadside, suffering a head injury which caused a loss of consciousness. Whilst being airlifted to hospital, he stopped breathing and was declared dead after undergoing numerous resuscitation attempts.

Stage 15 result

Rank	Rider	Team	Time
1	Richard Virenque (FRA)	Festina–Lotus	6h 20' 48"
2	Claudio Chiappucci (ITA)	Carrera Jeans–Tassoni	+ 1' 17"
3	Hernán Buenahora (COL)	Kelme–Avianca	+ 1' 18"
4	Fernando Escartín (ESP)	Mapei–GB–Latexco	+ 1' 20"
5	Bjarne Riis (DEN)	Gewiss–Ballan	+ 2' 29"
6	Miguel Induráin (ESP)	Banesto	+ 2' 34"
7	Alex Zülle (SUI)	ONCE	+ 2' 34"
8	Laurent Madouas (FRA)	Castorama	+ 2' 34"
9	Ivan Gotti (ITA)	Gewiss–Ballan	+ 3' 25"
10	Laurent Jalabert (FRA)	ONCE	+ 4' 32"

General classification after stage 15

Rank	Rider	Team	Time
1	Miguel Induráin (ESP)	Banesto	69h 51' 51"
2	Alex Zülle (SUI)	ONCE	+ 2' 46"
3	Bjarne Riis (DEN)	Gewiss–Ballan	+ 5' 59"
4	Laurent Jalabert (FRA)	ONCE	+ 6' 26"
5	Ivan Gotti (ITA)	Gewiss–Ballan	+ 9' 52"
6	Melcior Mauri (ESP)	ONCE	+ 13' 02"
7	Fernando Escartín (ESP)	Mapei–GB–Latexco	+ 14' 03"
8	Hernán Buenahora (COL)	Kelme–Avianca	+ 14' 07"
9	Claudio Chiappucci (ITA)	Carrera Jeans–Tassoni	+ 14' 35"
10	Richard Virenque (FRA)	Festina–Lotus	+ 14' 54"

== Stage 16 ==
19 July 1995 — Tarbes to Pau, 237 km (147 mi)

The stage was neutralised in memory of Fabio Casartelli. The route was ridden by the peloton, with Casartelli's Motorola teammates leading the way into Pau.

Stage 16 result (unofficial)

Rank	Rider	Team	Time
1	Andrea Peron (ITA)	Motorola	7h 50' 12"
2	Álvaro Mejía (COL)	Motorola	s.t.
3	Frankie Andreu (USA)	Motorola	s.t.
4	Lance Armstrong (USA)	Motorola	s.t.
5	Steve Bauer (CAN)	Motorola	s.t.
6	Stephen Swart (NZL)	Motorola	s.t.
-	Richard Virenque (FRA)	Festina–Lotus	s.t.
-	Claudio Chiappucci (ITA)	Carrera Jeans–Tassoni	s.t.
-	Hernán Buenahora (COL)	Kelme–Avianca	s.t.
-	Fernando Escartín (ESP)	Mapei–GB–Latexco	s.t.

General classification after stage 16

Rank	Rider	Team	Time
1	Miguel Induráin (ESP)	Banesto	77h 42' 03"
2	Alex Zülle (SUI)	ONCE	+ 2' 46"
3	Bjarne Riis (DEN)	Gewiss–Ballan	+ 5' 59"
4	Laurent Jalabert (FRA)	ONCE	+ 6' 26"
5	Ivan Gotti (ITA)	Gewiss–Ballan	+ 9' 52"
6	Melcior Mauri (ESP)	ONCE	+ 13' 02"
7	Fernando Escartín (ESP)	Mapei–GB–Latexco	+ 14' 03"
8	Hernán Buenahora (COL)	Kelme–Avianca	+ 14' 07"
9	Claudio Chiappucci (ITA)	Carrera Jeans–Tassoni	+ 14' 35"
10	Richard Virenque (FRA)	Festina–Lotus	+ 14' 54"

== Stage 17 ==
20 July 1995 — Pau to Bordeaux, 246 km (153 mi)

Stage 17 result

Rank	Rider	Team	Time
1	Erik Zabel (GER)	Team Telekom/ZG Mobili–Selle Italia	6h 29' 49"
2	Djamolidine Abdoujaparov (UZB)	Novell–Decca–Colnago	s.t.
3	Stefano Colagè (ITA)	Team Telekom/ZG Mobili–Selle Italia	s.t.
4	Giovanni Lombardi (ITA)	Polti–Granarolo–Santini	s.t.
5	Johan Museeuw (BEL)	Mapei–GB–Latexco	s.t.
6	Max Sciandri (GBR)	MG Maglificio–Technogym	s.t.
7	Laurent Jalabert (FRA)	ONCE	s.t.
8	François Simon (FRA)	Castorama	s.t.
9	Andrea Ferrigato (ITA)	Team Telekom/ZG Mobili–Selle Italia	s.t.
10	Andrei Tchmil (RUS)	Lotto–Isoglass	s.t.

General classification after stage 17

Rank	Rider	Team	Time
1	Miguel Induráin (ESP)	Banesto	84h 11' 52"
2	Alex Zülle (SUI)	ONCE	+ 2' 46"
3	Bjarne Riis (DEN)	Gewiss–Ballan	+ 5' 59"
4	Laurent Jalabert (FRA)	ONCE	+ 6' 26"
5	Ivan Gotti (ITA)	Gewiss–Ballan	+ 9' 52"
6	Melcior Mauri (ESP)	ONCE	+ 13' 02"
7	Fernando Escartín (ESP)	Mapei–GB–Latexco	+ 14' 03"
8	Hernán Buenahora (COL)	Kelme–Avianca	+ 14' 07"
9	Claudio Chiappucci (ITA)	Carrera Jeans–Tassoni	+ 14' 35"
10	Richard Virenque (FRA)	Festina–Lotus	+ 14' 54"

== Stage 18 ==
21 July 1995 — Montpon-Ménestérol to Limoges, 166 km (103 mi)

Stage 18 result

Rank	Rider	Team	Time
1	Lance Armstrong (USA)	Motorola	3h 47' 53"
2	Andrea Ferrigato (ITA)	Team Telekom/ZG Mobili–Selle Italia	+ 33"
3	Viatcheslav Ekimov (RUS)	Novell–Decca–Colnago	+ 44"
4	Jean-Cyril Robin (FRA)	Festina–Lotus	+ 44"
5	Maarten den Bakker (NED)	TVM–Polis Direct	+ 48"
6	Andrea Tafi (ITA)	Mapei–GB–Latexco	+ 48"
7	Massimiliano Lelli (ITA)	Mercatone Uno–Saeco	+ 58"
8	Bruno Cenghialta (ITA)	Gewiss–Ballan	+ 1' 47"
9	Johan Bruyneel (BEL)	ONCE	+ 1' 47"
10	Max Sciandri (GBR)	MG Maglificio–Technogym	+ 1' 47"

General classification after stage 18

Rank	Rider	Team	Time
1	Miguel Induráin (ESP)	Banesto	88h 07' 39"
2	Alex Zülle (SUI)	ONCE	+ 2' 46"
3	Bjarne Riis (DEN)	Gewiss–Ballan	+ 5' 59"
4	Laurent Jalabert (FRA)	ONCE	+ 6' 26"
5	Ivan Gotti (ITA)	Gewiss–Ballan	+ 9' 52"
6	Melcior Mauri (ESP)	ONCE	+ 13' 02"
7	Fernando Escartín (ESP)	Mapei–GB–Latexco	+ 14' 03"
8	Hernán Buenahora (COL)	Kelme–Avianca	+ 14' 07"
9	Claudio Chiappucci (ITA)	Carrera Jeans–Tassoni	+ 14' 35"
10	Richard Virenque (FRA)	Festina–Lotus	+ 14' 54"

== Stage 19 ==
22 July 1995 — Lac de Vassivière, 46 km (29 mi) (individual time trial)

Stage 19 result

Rank	Rider	Team	Time
1	Miguel Induráin (ESP)	Banesto	57' 34"
2	Bjarne Riis (DEN)	Gewiss–Ballan	+ 48"
3	Tony Rominger (SUI)	Mapei–GB–Latexco	+ 1' 05"
4	Ivan Gotti (ITA)	Gewiss–Ballan	+ 1' 41"
5	Fernando Escartín (ESP)	Mapei–GB–Latexco	+ 1' 46"
6	Alex Zülle (SUI)	ONCE	+ 1' 49"
7	Laurent Jalabert (FRA)	ONCE	+ 1' 58"
8	Melcior Mauri (ESP)	ONCE	+ 2' 18"
9	Richard Virenque (FRA)	Festina–Lotus	+ 2' 37"
10	Álvaro Mejía (COL)	Motorola	+ 3' 07"

General classification after stage 19

Rank	Rider	Team	Time
1	Miguel Induráin (ESP)	Banesto	89h 05' 13"
2	Alex Zülle (SUI)	ONCE	+ 4' 35"
3	Bjarne Riis (DEN)	Gewiss–Ballan	+ 6' 47"
4	Laurent Jalabert (FRA)	ONCE	+ 8' 24"
5	Ivan Gotti (ITA)	Gewiss–Ballan	+ 11' 33"
6	Melcior Mauri (ESP)	ONCE	+ 15' 20"
7	Fernando Escartín (ESP)	Mapei–GB–Latexco	+ 15' 49"
8	Tony Rominger (SUI)	Mapei–GB–Latexco	+ 16' 46"
9	Richard Virenque (FRA)	Festina–Lotus	+ 17' 31"
10	Hernán Buenahora (COL)	Kelme–Avianca	+ 18' 50"

== Stage 20 ==
23 July 1995 — Sainte-Geneviève-des-Bois to Paris Champs-Élysées, 155 km (96 mi)

Stage 20 result

Rank	Rider	Team	Time
1	Djamolidine Abdoujaparov (UZB)	Novell–Decca–Colnago	3h 39' 46"
2	Gian Matteo Fagnini (ITA)	Mercatone Uno–Saeco	s.t.
3	Giovanni Lombardi (ITA)	Polti–Granarolo–Santini	s.t.
4	Laurent Jalabert (FRA)	ONCE	s.t.
5	Max Sciandri (GBR)	MG Maglificio–Technogym	s.t.
6	Erik Zabel (GER)	Team Telekom/ZG Mobili–Selle Italia	s.t.
7	Stefano Colagè (ITA)	Team Telekom/ZG Mobili–Selle Italia	s.t.
8	Johan Museeuw (BEL)	Mapei–GB–Latexco	s.t.
9	Giovanni Fidanza (ITA)	Polti–Granarolo–Santini	s.t.
10	Frankie Andreu (USA)	Motorola	s.t.

General classification after stage 20

Rank	Rider	Team	Time
1	Miguel Induráin (ESP)	Banesto	92h 44' 59"
2	Alex Zülle (SUI)	ONCE	+ 4' 35"
3	Bjarne Riis (DEN)	Gewiss–Ballan	+ 6' 47"
4	Laurent Jalabert (FRA)	ONCE	+ 8' 24"
5	Ivan Gotti (ITA)	Gewiss–Ballan	+ 11' 33"
6	Melcior Mauri (ESP)	ONCE	+ 15' 20"
7	Fernando Escartín (ESP)	Mapei–GB–Latexco	+ 15' 49"
8	Tony Rominger (SUI)	Mapei–GB–Latexco	+ 16' 46"
9	Richard Virenque (FRA)	Festina–Lotus	+ 17' 31"
10	Hernán Buenahora (COL)	Kelme–Avianca	+ 18' 50"
