= 1995 Tour de France, Prologue to Stage 10 =

Cycling race stages

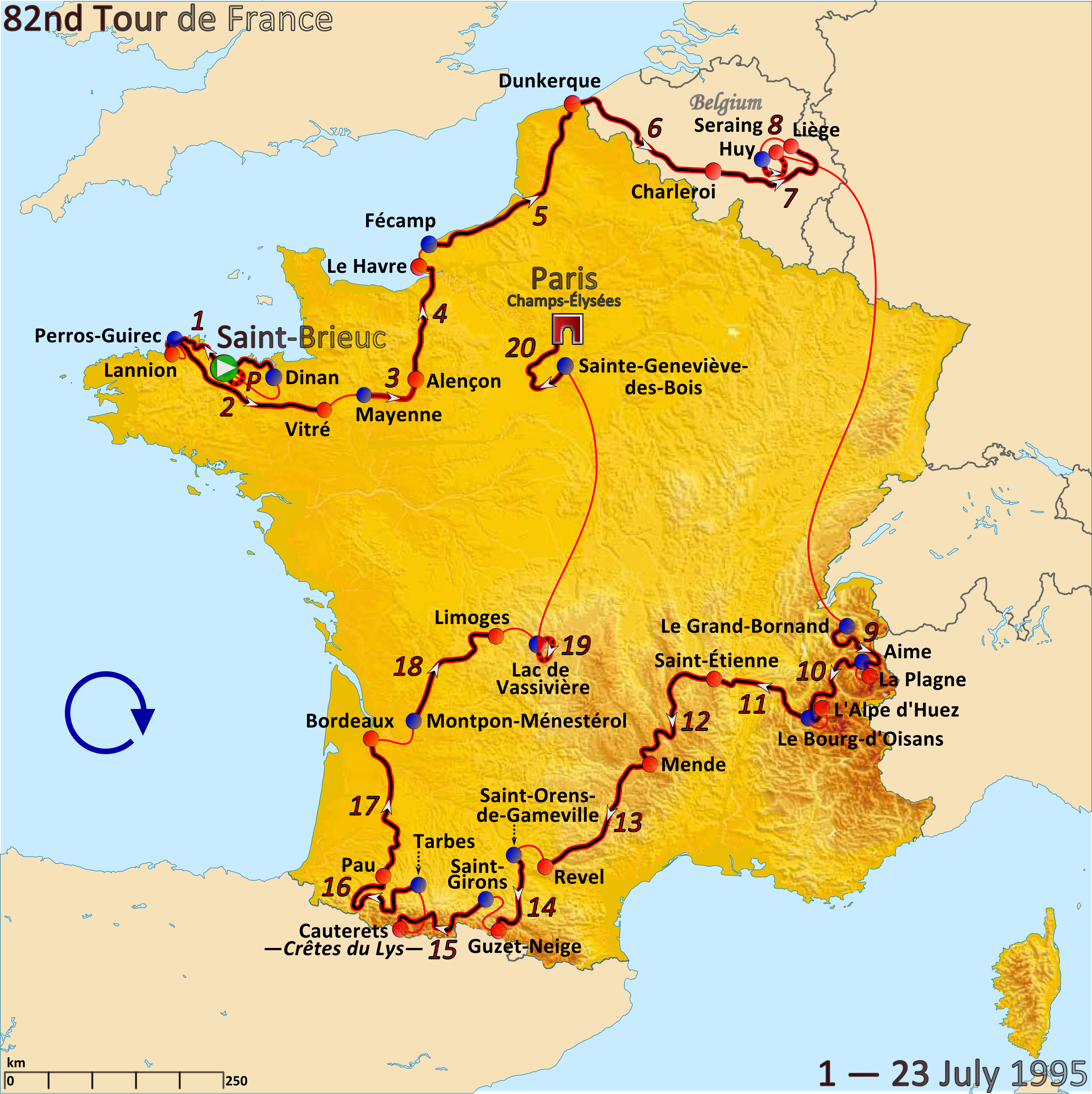
Route of the 1995 Tour de France

The 1995 Tour de France was the 82nd edition of Tour de France, one of cycling's Grand Tours. The Tour began in Saint-Brieuc with a prologue individual time trial on 1 July and Stage 10 occurred on 12 July with a mountainous stage to Alpe d'Huez. The race finished on the Champs-Élysées in Paris on 23 July.

== Prologue ==
1 July 1995 — Saint-Brieuc, 7.3 km (4.5 mi) (individual time trial)

Prologue result and general classification after prologue

Rank	Rider	Team	Time
1	Jacky Durand (FRA)	Castorama	9' 00"
2	Thierry Laurent (FRA)	Castorama	+ 2"
3	Francis Moreau (FRA)	GAN	+ 3"
4	Laurent Brochard (FRA)	Festina–Lotus	+ 4"
5	Arsenio González (ESP)	Mapei–GB–Latexco	+ 4"
6	Rolf Aldag (GER)	Team Telekom/ZG Mobili–Selle Italia	+ 5"
7	Frankie Andreu (USA)	Motorola	+ 5"
8	Gabriele Colombo (ITA)	Gewiss–Ballan	+ 8"
9	Stephen Swart (NZL)	Motorola	+ 8"
10	Bruno Thibout (FRA)	Castorama	+ 9"

== Stage 1 ==
2 July 1995 — Dinan to Lannion, 233.5 km (145.1 mi)

Stage 1 result

Rank	Rider	Team	Time
1	Fabio Baldato (ITA)	MG Maglificio–Technogym	5h 49' 18"
2	Laurent Jalabert (FRA)	ONCE	s.t.
3	Djamolidine Abdoujaparov (UZB)	Novell–Decca–Colnago	s.t.
4	Andrea Ferrigato (ITA)	Team Telekom/ZG Mobili–Selle Italia	s.t.
5	Giovanni Lombardi (ITA)	Polti–Granarolo–Santini	s.t.
6	Tony Rominger (SUI)	Mapei–GB–Latexco	s.t.
7	Johan Museeuw (BEL)	Mapei–GB–Latexco	s.t.
8	Bruno Thibout (FRA)	Castorama	s.t.
9	Bjarne Riis (DEN)	Gewiss–Ballan	s.t.
10	Alexander Gontchenkov (UKR)	Lampre–Panaria	s.t.

General classification after stage 1

Rank	Rider	Team	Time
1	Jacky Durand (FRA)	Castorama	5h 58' 18"
2	Laurent Brochard (FRA)	Festina–Lotus	+ 2"
3	Thierry Laurent (FRA)	Castorama	+ 2"
4	Arsenio González (ESP)	Mapei–GB–Latexco	+ 4"
5	Frankie Andreu (USA)	Motorola	+ 5"
6	Laurent Jalabert (FRA)	ONCE	+ 7"
7	Bruno Thibout (FRA)	Castorama	+ 9"
8	Yvon Ledanois (FRA)	GAN	+ 13"
9	Vicente Aparicio (ESP)	Banesto	+ 13"
10	Francisco Javier Mauleón (ESP)	Mapei–GB–Latexco	+ 18"

== Stage 2 ==
3 July 1995 — Perros-Guirec to Vitré, 235.5 km (146.3 mi)

Stage 2 result

Rank	Rider	Team	Time
1	Mario Cipollini (ITA)	Mercatone Uno–Saeco	5h 26' 35"
2	Giovanni Lombardi (ITA)	Polti–Granarolo–Santini	s.t.
3	Djamolidine Abdoujaparov (UZB)	Novell–Decca–Colnago	s.t.
4	Fabio Baldato (ITA)	MG Maglificio–Technogym	s.t.
5	Frédéric Moncassin (FRA)	Novell–Decca–Colnago	s.t.
6	Bo Hamburger (DEN)	TVM–Polis Direct	s.t.
7	Laurent Jalabert (FRA)	ONCE	s.t.
8	Francesco Frattini (ITA)	Gewiss–Ballan	s.t.
9	Bjarne Riis (DEN)	Gewiss–Ballan	s.t.
10	Alexander Gontchenkov (UKR)	Lampre–Panaria	s.t.

General classification after stage 2

Rank	Rider	Team	Time
1	Laurent Jalabert (FRA)	ONCE	11h 24' 50"
2	Laurent Brochard (FRA)	Festina–Lotus	+ 5"
3	Bruno Thibout (FRA)	Castorama	+ 12"
4	Jacky Durand (FRA)	Castorama	+ 22"
5	Thierry Laurent (FRA)	Castorama	+ 24"
6	Melcior Mauri (ESP)	ONCE	+ 25"
7	Fabio Baldato (ITA)	MG Maglificio–Technogym	+ 26"
8	Alex Zülle (SUI)	ONCE	+ 26"
9	Arsenio González (ESP)	Mapei–GB–Latexco	+ 26"
10	Frankie Andreu (USA)	Motorola	+ 27"

== Stage 3 ==
4 July 1995 — Mayenne to Alençon, 67 km (42 mi) (TTT)

Stage 3 result

Rank	Team	Time
1	Gewiss–Ballan	1h 13' 10"
2	ONCE	+ 35"
3	Banesto	+ 59"
4	Mapei–GB–Latexco	+ 1' 33"
5	MG Maglificio–Technogym	+ 1' 34"
6	Motorola	+ 1' 59"
7	Festina–Lotus	+ 2' 21"
8	Lampre–Panaria	+ 2' 27"
9	Castorama	+ 2' 32"
10	Novell–Decca–Colnago	+ 2' 51"

General classification after stage 3

Rank	Rider	Team	Time
1	Laurent Jalabert (FRA)	ONCE	12h 38' 35"
2	Ivan Gotti (ITA)	Gewiss–Ballan	+ 8"
3	Bjarne Riis (DEN)	Gewiss–Ballan	+ 9"
4	Gabriele Colombo (ITA)	Gewiss–Ballan	+ 12"
5	Melcior Mauri (ESP)	ONCE	+ 25"
6	Alex Zülle (SUI)	ONCE	+ 26"
7	Johan Bruyneel (BEL)	ONCE	+ 32"
8	Evgeni Berzin (RUS)	Gewiss–Ballan	+ 35"
9	Francesco Frattini (ITA)	Gewiss–Ballan	+ 38"
10	Bruno Cenghialta (ITA)	Gewiss–Ballan	+ 51"

== Stage 4 ==
5 July 1995 — Alençon to Le Havre, 162 km (101 mi)

Stage 4 result

Rank	Rider	Team	Time
1	Mario Cipollini (ITA)	Mercatone Uno–Saeco	3h 40' 23"
2	Erik Zabel (GER)	Team Telekom/ZG Mobili–Selle Italia	s.t.
3	Frédéric Moncassin (FRA)	Novell–Decca–Colnago	s.t.
4	Thierry Laurent (FRA)	Castorama	s.t.
5	Frankie Andreu (USA)	Motorola	s.t.
6	Ján Svorada (SVK)	Lampre–Panaria	s.t.
7	Gianluca Bortolami (ITA)	Mapei–GB–Latexco	s.t.
8	Andrei Tchmil (RUS)	Lotto–Isoglass	s.t.
9	Bjarne Riis (DEN)	Gewiss–Ballan	s.t.
10	Jeroen Blijlevens (NED)	TVM–Polis Direct	s.t.

General classification after stage 4

Rank	Rider	Team	Time
1	Ivan Gotti (ITA)	Gewiss–Ballan	16h 19' 06"
2	Bjarne Riis (DEN)	Gewiss–Ballan	+ 1"
3	Melcior Mauri (ESP)	ONCE	+ 17"
4	Alex Zülle (SUI)	ONCE	+ 18"
5	Johan Bruyneel (BEL)	ONCE	+ 24"
6	Evgeni Berzin (RUS)	Gewiss–Ballan	+ 27"
7	Francesco Frattini (ITA)	Gewiss–Ballan	+ 30"
8	Laurent Jalabert (FRA)	ONCE	+ 40"
9	Bruno Cenghialta (ITA)	Gewiss–Ballan	+ 43"
10	Miguel Induráin (ESP)	Banesto	+ 50"

== Stage 5 ==
6 July 1995 — Fécamp to Dunkirk, 261 km (162 mi)

Stage 5 result

Rank	Rider	Team	Time
1	Jeroen Blijlevens (NED)	TVM–Polis Direct	5h 51' 46"
2	Ján Svorada (SVK)	Lampre–Panaria	s.t.
3	Erik Zabel (GER)	Team Telekom/ZG Mobili–Selle Italia	s.t.
4	Frédéric Moncassin (FRA)	Novell–Decca–Colnago	s.t.
5	Mario Cipollini (ITA)	Mercatone Uno–Saeco	s.t.
6	Jaan Kirsipuu (EST)	Chazal–MBK–König	s.t.
7	Djamolidine Abdoujaparov (UZB)	Novell–Decca–Colnago	s.t.
8	Denis Zanette (ITA)	Aki–Gipiemme	s.t.
9	Laurent Jalabert (FRA)	ONCE	s.t.
10	Frankie Andreu (USA)	Motorola	s.t.

General classification after stage 5

Rank	Rider	Team	Time
1	Ivan Gotti (ITA)	Gewiss–Ballan	22h 10' 52"
2	Bjarne Riis (DEN)	Gewiss–Ballan	+ 1"
3	Melcior Mauri (ESP)	ONCE	+ 17"
4	Alex Zülle (SUI)	ONCE	+ 18"
5	Johan Bruyneel (BEL)	ONCE	+ 24"
6	Evgeni Berzin (RUS)	Gewiss–Ballan	+ 27"
7	Francesco Frattini (ITA)	Gewiss–Ballan	+ 30"
8	Laurent Jalabert (FRA)	ONCE	+ 34"
9	Bruno Cenghialta (ITA)	Gewiss–Ballan	+ 43"
10	Miguel Induráin (ESP)	Banesto	+ 50"

== Stage 6 ==
7 July 1995 — Dunkirk to Charleroi (Belgium), 202 km (126 mi)

Stage 6 result

Rank	Rider	Team	Time
1	Erik Zabel (GER)	Team Telekom/ZG Mobili–Selle Italia	4h 30' 57"
2	Laurent Jalabert (FRA)	ONCE	s.t.
3	Djamolidine Abdoujaparov (UZB)	Novell–Decca–Colnago	s.t.
4	Ján Svorada (SVK)	Lampre–Panaria	s.t.
5	Giovanni Lombardi (ITA)	Polti–Granarolo–Santini	s.t.
6	Bruno Thibout (FRA)	Castorama	s.t.
7	Jacky Durand (FRA)	Castorama	s.t.
8	Andrei Tchmil (RUS)	Lotto–Isoglass	+ 3"
9	Carlo Bomans (BEL)	Mapei–GB–Latexco	+ 3"
10	Olaf Ludwig (GER)	Team Telekom/ZG Mobili–Selle Italia	+ 3"

General classification after stage 6

Rank	Rider	Team	Time
1	Bjarne Riis (DEN)	Gewiss–Ballan	26h 41' 53"
2	Ivan Gotti (ITA)	Gewiss–Ballan	+ 2"
3	Laurent Jalabert (FRA)	ONCE	+ 8"
4	Melcior Mauri (ESP)	ONCE	+ 19"
5	Alex Zülle (SUI)	ONCE	+ 20"
6	Johan Bruyneel (BEL)	ONCE	+ 26"
7	Evgeni Berzin (RUS)	Gewiss–Ballan	+ 29"
8	Francesco Frattini (ITA)	Gewiss–Ballan	+ 32"
9	Bruno Cenghialta (ITA)	Gewiss–Ballan	+ 45"
10	Miguel Induráin (ESP)	Banesto	+ 49"

== Stage 7 ==
8 July 1995 — Charleroi (Belgium) to Liège (Belgium), 203 km (126 mi)

Stage 7 result

Rank	Rider	Team	Time
1	Johan Bruyneel (BEL)	ONCE	4h 48' 14"
2	Miguel Induráin (ESP)	Banesto	s.t.
3	Jesper Skibby (DEN)	TVM–Polis Direct	+ 50"
4	Jens Heppner (GER)	Team Telekom/ZG Mobili–Selle Italia	+ 50"
5	Giovanni Lombardi (ITA)	Polti–Granarolo–Santini	+ 50"
6	Laurent Jalabert (FRA)	ONCE	+ 50"
7	Bruno Thibout (FRA)	Castorama	+ 50"
8	François Simon (FRA)	Castorama	+ 50"
9	Bo Hamburger (DEN)	TVM–Polis Direct	+ 50"
10	Andrea Ferrigato (ITA)	Team Telekom/ZG Mobili–Selle Italia	+ 50"

General classification after stage 7

Rank	Rider	Team	Time
1	Johan Bruyneel (BEL)	ONCE	31h 30' 13"
2	Miguel Induráin (ESP)	Banesto	+ 31"
3	Laurent Jalabert (FRA)	ONCE	+ 42"
4	Bjarne Riis (DEN)	Gewiss–Ballan	+ 42"
5	Ivan Gotti (ITA)	Gewiss–Ballan	+ 46"
6	Melcior Mauri (ESP)	ONCE	+ 1' 03"
7	Alex Zülle (SUI)	ONCE	+ 1' 04"
8	Evgeni Berzin (RUS)	Gewiss–Ballan	+ 1' 13"
9	Vicente Aparicio (ESP)	Banesto	+ 1' 37"
10	Mariano Rojas (ESP)	ONCE	+ 1' 39"

== Stage 8 ==
9 July 1995 — Huy (Belgium) to Seraing (Belgium), 54 km (34 mi) (ITT)

Stage 8 result

Rank	Rider	Team	Time
1	Miguel Induráin (ESP)	Banesto	1h 04' 16"
2	Bjarne Riis (DEN)	Gewiss–Ballan	+ 12"
3	Tony Rominger (SUI)	Mapei–GB–Latexco	+ 58"
4	Evgeni Berzin (RUS)	Gewiss–Ballan	+ 1' 38"
5	Melcior Mauri (ESP)	ONCE	+ 2' 16"
6	Laurent Jalabert (FRA)	ONCE	+ 2' 36"
7	Johan Bruyneel (BEL)	ONCE	+ 3' 01"
8	Bruno Thibout (FRA)	Castorama	+ 3' 33"
9	Erik Breukink (NED)	ONCE	+ 3' 48"
10	Alex Zülle (SUI)	ONCE	+ 3' 56"

General classification after stage 8

Rank	Rider	Team	Time
1	Miguel Induráin (ESP)	Banesto	32h 35' 00"
2	Bjarne Riis (DEN)	Gewiss–Ballan	+ 23"
3	Evgeni Berzin (RUS)	Gewiss–Ballan	+ 2' 20"
4	Johan Bruyneel (BEL)	ONCE	+ 2' 30"
5	Tony Rominger (SUI)	Mapei–GB–Latexco	+ 2' 32"
6	Laurent Jalabert (FRA)	ONCE	+ 2' 47"
7	Melcior Mauri (ESP)	ONCE	+ 2' 48"
8	Ivan Gotti (ITA)	Gewiss–Ballan	+ 4' 19"
9	Alex Zülle (SUI)	ONCE	+ 4' 29"
10	Erik Breukink (NED)	ONCE	+ 5' 11"

== Stage 9 ==
11 July 1995 — Le Grand-Bornand to La Plagne, 160 km (99 mi)

Stage 9 result

Rank	Rider	Team	Time
1	Alex Zülle (SUI)	ONCE	4h 41' 18"
2	Miguel Induráin (ESP)	Banesto	+ 2' 02"
3	Pavel Tonkov (RUS)	Lampre–Panaria	+ 4' 11"
4	Marco Pantani (ITA)	Carrera Jeans–Tassoni	+ 4' 37"
5	Ivan Gotti (ITA)	Gewiss–Ballan	+ 4' 37"
6	Richard Virenque (FRA)	Festina–Lotus	+ 6' 05"
7	Tony Rominger (SUI)	Mapei–GB–Latexco	+ 6' 05"
8	Paolo Lanfranchi (ITA)	Brescialat–Fago	+ 6' 05"
9	Claudio Chiappucci (ITA)	Carrera Jeans–Tassoni	+ 6' 05"
10	Laudelino Cubino (ESP)	Kelme–Avianca	+ 6' 26"

General classification after stage 9

Rank	Rider	Team	Time
1	Miguel Induráin (ESP)	Banesto	37h 18' 20"
2	Alex Zülle (SUI)	ONCE	+ 2' 27"
3	Bjarne Riis (DEN)	Gewiss–Ballan	+ 5' 58"
4	Tony Rominger (SUI)	Mapei–GB–Latexco	+ 6' 35"
5	Ivan Gotti (ITA)	Gewiss–Ballan	+ 6' 54"
6	Laurent Jalabert (FRA)	ONCE	+ 8' 14"
7	Melcior Mauri (ESP)	ONCE	+ 8' 17"
8	Pavel Tonkov (RUS)	Lampre–Panaria	+ 11' 11"
9	Claudio Chiappucci (ITA)	Carrera Jeans–Tassoni	+ 12' 32"
10	Fernando Escartín (ESP)	Mapei–GB–Latexco	+ 13' 06"

== Stage 10 ==
12 July 1995 — La Plagne to Alpe d'Huez, 162 km (101 mi)

Stage 10 result

Rank	Rider	Team	Time
1	Marco Pantani (ITA)	Carrera Jeans–Tassoni	5h 13' 14"
2	Miguel Induráin (ESP)	Banesto	+ 1' 24"
3	Alex Zülle (SUI)	ONCE	+ 1' 24"
4	Bjarne Riis (DEN)	Gewiss–Ballan	+ 1' 26"
5	Laurent Madouas (FRA)	Castorama	+ 1' 54"
6	Fernando Escartín (ESP)	Mapei–GB–Latexco	+ 2' 01"
7	Laurent Jalabert (FRA)	ONCE	+ 2' 26"
8	Richard Virenque (FRA)	Festina–Lotus	+ 2' 50"
9	Ivan Gotti (ITA)	Gewiss–Ballan	+ 2' 50"
10	Claudio Chiappucci (ITA)	Carrera Jeans–Tassoni	+ 3' 02"

General classification after stage 10

Rank	Rider	Team	Time
1	Miguel Induráin (ESP)	Banesto	42h 32' 58"
2	Alex Zülle (SUI)	ONCE	+ 2' 27"
3	Bjarne Riis (DEN)	Gewiss–Ballan	+ 6' 00"
4	Tony Rominger (SUI)	Mapei–GB–Latexco	+ 8' 19"
5	Ivan Gotti (ITA)	Gewiss–Ballan	+ 8' 20"
6	Laurent Jalabert (FRA)	ONCE	+ 9' 16"
7	Marco Pantani (ITA)	Carrera Jeans–Tassoni	+ 12' 38"
8	Melcior Mauri (ESP)	ONCE	+ 12' 49"
9	Pavel Tonkov (RUS)	Lampre–Panaria	+ 12' 58"
10	Fernando Escartín (ESP)	Mapei–GB–Latexco	+ 13' 43"
