= Elaine Cassidy =

Irish actress (born 1979)

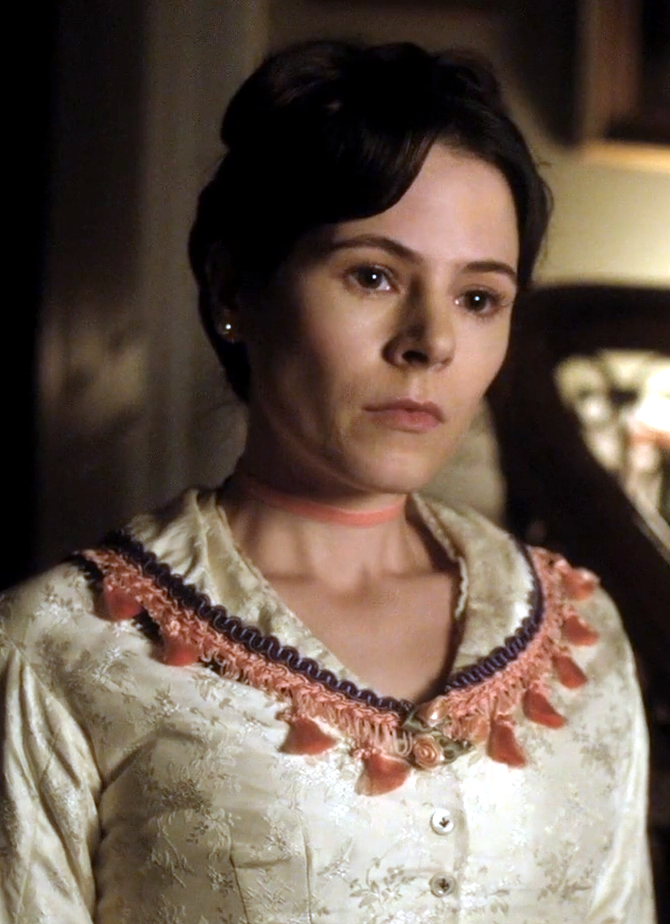
- in The Paradise 2012
- Born: 31 December 1979 (age 46); Raheny, County Dublin, Ireland
- Occupation: Actress
- Years active: 1994–present
- Spouse: Stephen Lord (m. 2007)
- Children: 2 (including Kíla)

Elaine Cassidy (born 31 December 1979) is an Irish actress. Her films include The Sun, the Moon and the Stars (1996), Felicia's Journey (1999), The Others (2001), Disco Pigs (2002), And When Did You Last See Your Father? (2007), The Program (2015), Strangeways Here We Come (2018), The Wonder (2022), and The Last Kingdom: Seven Kings Must Die (2023).

On television, her credits include The Ghost Squad (2005), Fingersmith (2005), Little White Lie (2008), Harper's Island (2009), The Paradise (2012), No Offence (2015–2018), Intruder (2021), and A Discovery of Witches (2021–2022), Sanctuary: A Witch's Tale (2024), Belgravia: The Next Chapter (2024) and The Lost World (2001).

== Early life ==
Cassidy was born in Raheny, and moved with her family to Kilcoole when she was three years old. Her first role was as the title character in a school production of Pinocchio when she was five. She participated in drama classes throughout secondary school.

== Career ==
In 1996, Cassidy was nominated for the Most Promising Actress at the Geneva Film Festival for her role in The Sun, the Moon and the Stars. In 1999, she played the starring role in Felicia's Journey, for which she was nominated Best Actress at the 20th Genie Awards. She was named EFP European Shooting Star for in 2001.

She has won two Irish Film and Television Awards (IFTA) for Best Actress in a Lead Role in Film in 2003 for her role as Runt in Disco Pigs, and in 2010 for Best Actress in a Lead Role in Television for her role as Abby Mills in the American CBS TV series Harper's Island. She was also nominated for an IFTA in 2005 as Best Actress in a Lead Role in Television for her role as "Maud Lilly" in the BBC BAFTA nominated drama Fingersmith, in 2007 as Best Actress in a Supporting Role in Film for her role as Sandra in And When Did You Last See Your Father?, and in 2009 as Best Actress in a Lead Role in Television for her role as Annie Mulcahy in Little White Lie.

In theatre, she has appeared in The Lieutenant of Inishmore (2002) and The Crucible (2006) with the Royal Shakespeare Company, and in There Came A Gypsy Riding at the Almeida Theatre in 2007.

In 2002, she appeared in the music video for Coldplay's "The Scientist". In 2011, she played Maureen in the TV film Just Henry.

In 2015, she played a main role of DC Dinah Kowalska in the Channel 4 drama series No Offence (2015–2018), and Sarah Manning in Acceptable Risk (2017).

In 2022, she starred as Rosaleen O'Donnell in the Irish film The Wonder, alongside her own daughter Kila, who played "the wonder" and co-starring Florence Pugh. She received a nomination for Best Supporting Actress in a Film at the 'Irish Film and Television Awards in 2023.

In 2023, she starred in the film The Last Kingdom: Seven Kings Must Die, playing Eadgifu of Kent, the role was previously played by Sonya Cassidy in the TV series.

== Personal life ==
Cassidy married English actor Stephen Lord, whom she met on the set of The Truth, on 31 December 2007. They live in Greenwich, London, with their daughter Kíla, and their son.

== Filmography ==
=== Film ===
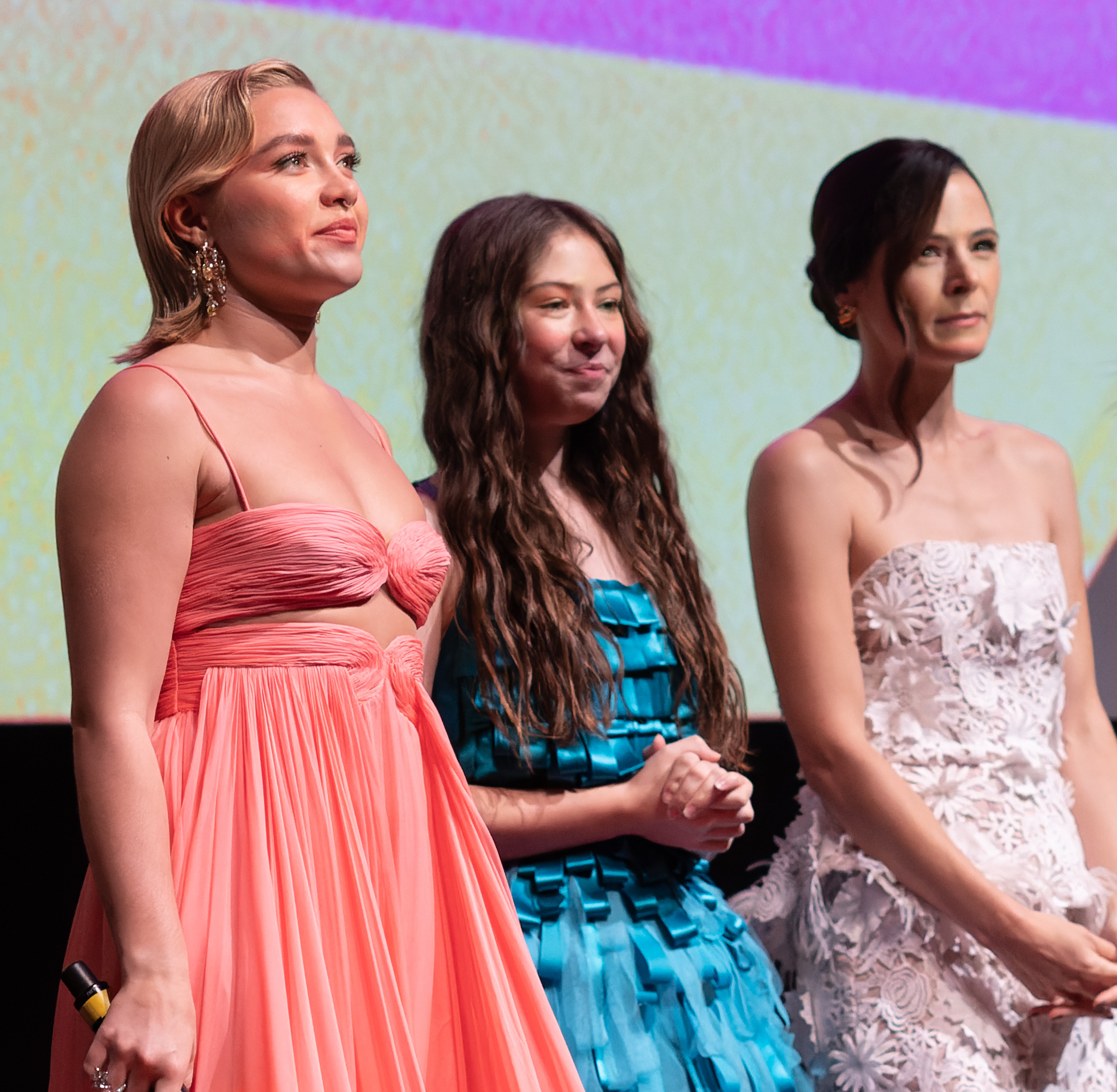
Cassidy (right) with her daughter Kíla (centre) and Florence Pugh representing The Wonder in 2022

Year	Title	Role	Notes
1996	The Sun, the Moon and the Stars	Shelley	
1999	Felicia's Journey	Felicia	
2001	The Others	Lydia	
2001	Disco Pigs	Runt	
2002	The Bay of Love and Sorrows	Carrie Matchett	
2006	The Truth	Candy	
2007	And When Did You Last See Your Father?	Sandra	
2014	The Loft	Ellie Seacord	
2016	The Program	Betsy Andreu	
2016	Mum's List	Rachel	
2016	Property of the State	Margaret	
2018	Strangeways Here We Come	Steph Nolan	
2022	The Wonder	Rosaleen O'Donnell	
2023	The Last Kingdom: Seven Kings Must Die	Eadgifu	
2025	Salvable	Elaine	

=== Television ===
Year	Title	Role	Notes
1995	Mission Top Secret	Mary	Episode: "The Crown Jewels Are Missing"
2001	The Lost World	Agnes Cluny	Miniseries
2003	Watermelon	Anna Ryan	TV film
2005	Uncle Adolf	Geli Raubal	TV film
2005	Fingersmith	Maud Lilly	Miniseries; 3 episodes
2005	The Ghost Squad	Det. Amy Harris	Main role; 8 episodes
2007	A Room with a View	Lucy Honeychurch	TV film
2008	Little White Lie	Annie Mulcahy	TV film
2009	Harper's Island	Abby Mills	Main role; 13 episodes
2011	Just Henry	Maureen Dodge	TV film
2011	The Miraculous Year	Brona McKinney	TV film
2012–2013	The Paradise	Katherine Weston	Main role; 16 episodes
2015–2018	No Offence	DC Dinah Kowalska	Main role; 21 episodes
2017	Acceptable Risk	Sarah Manning	Main role; 6 episodes
2020	The Dark Tower	Gabrielle Deschain	TV film
2021	Intruder	Rebecca Hickey	Main role; 4 episodes
2021–2022	A Discovery of Witches	Louisa de Clermont	Main role (series 2)
2024	Sanctuary: A Witch's Tale	Sarah Fenn	Main role; 7 episodes
2024	Belgravia: The Next Chapter	Davison	Main role; 8 episodes

=== Music video ===
- "The Scientist" by Coldplay, as Passenger

== Theatre ==
- The Lieutenant of Inishmore (2002)
- Scenes from the Big Picture (2003)
- The Crucible (2006)
- There Came a Gypsy Riding (2007)
- Fathers and Sons (2014)
- Deluge (2015)
- Les Liaisons Dangereuses (2015 to 2016)
- Aristocrats, Donmar Warehouse (2018)
- Even These Things, The Royal Exchange Theatre (2026)

== Awards ==
Year	Award	Category	Result	Work	Ref.
1996	Geneva Film Festival	Most Promising Actress	Won	The Sun, the Moon and the Stars	
2000	Golden Satellite Award	Best Actress in a Motion Picture, Drama	Nominated	Felicia's Journey	
2000	Genie Award	Best Actress in a Leading Role	Nominated	Felicia's Journey	
2001	EFP Shooting Stars Award	Most promising international talent for Ireland	Won	Career achievement	
2002	British Independent Film Award	Best Actress	Nominated	Disco Pigs	
2003	Irish Film and Television Awards	Best Actress in a Feature Film	Won	Disco Pigs	
2005	Irish Film and Television Awards	Best Actress in Television	Nominated	Fingersmith	
2008	Irish Film and Television Awards	Best Actress in a Supporting Role in a Feature Film	Nominated	And When Did You Last See Your Father?	
2009	Irish Film and Television Awards	Best Actress in Television	Nominated	Little White Lie	
2010	Irish Film and Television Awards	Best Actress in Television	Won	Harper's Island	
2016	Irish Film and Television Awards	Best Actress in a Lead Role – Drama	Nominated	No Offence	
2018	Irish Film and Television Awards	Best Actress in a Lead Role – Drama	Nominated	Acceptable Risk	
2023	Irish Film and Television Awards	Best Actress in a Supporting Role in a Feature Film	Nominated	The Wonder	
2025	Irish Film and Television Awards	Best Actress in a Lead Role – Drama	Nominated	Sanctuary: A Witch's Tale	
