= 1995 Tour de France =

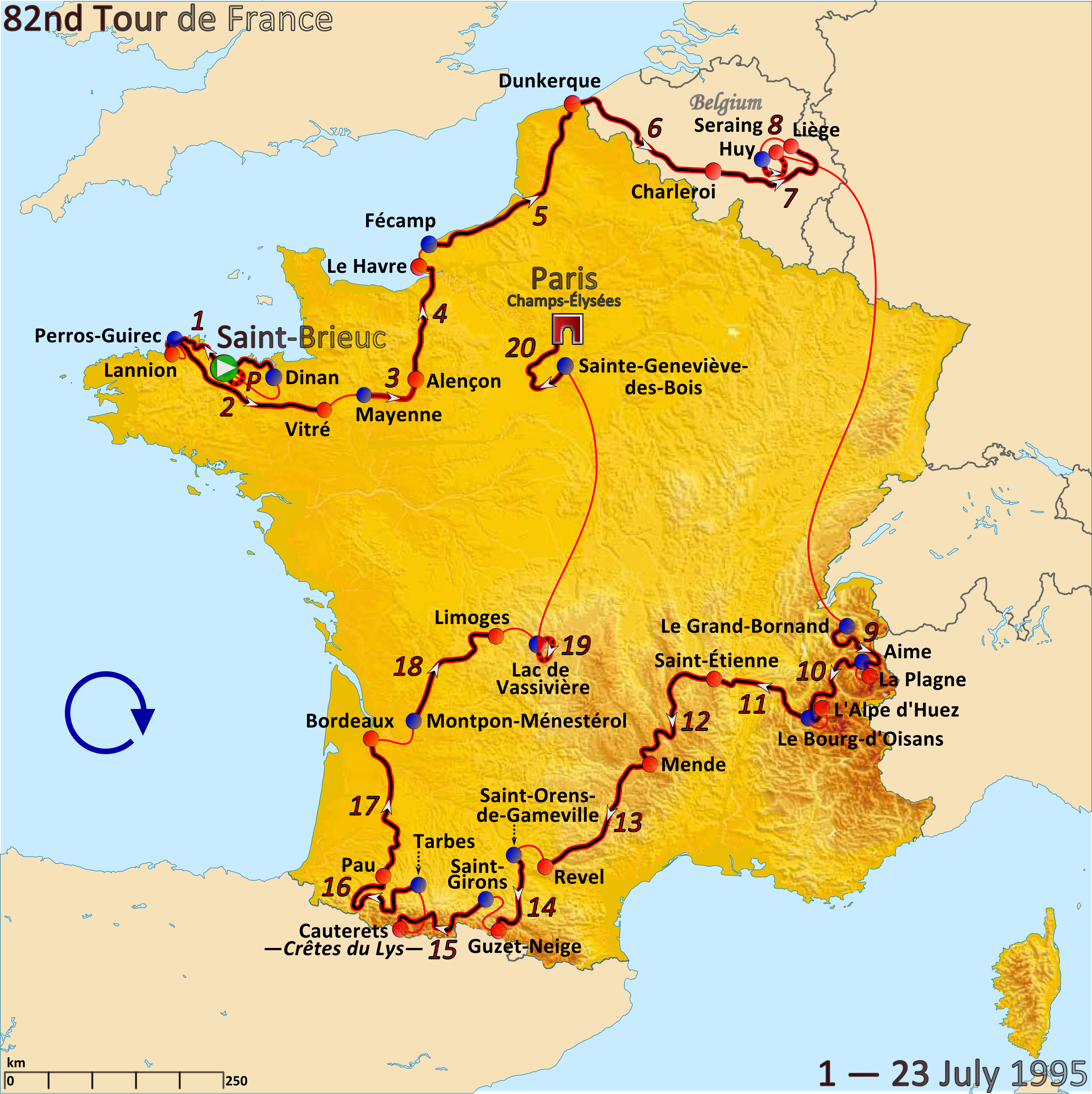
- Route of the 1995 Tour de France

Race details
- Dates: 1–23 July 1995
- Stages: 20 + Prologue
- Distance: 3,635 km (2,259 mi)
- Winning time: 92h 44' 59"

Results
Jersey awarded to the overall winner	Winner	Miguel Induráin (ESP)	(Banesto)
	Second	Alex Zülle (SUI)	(ONCE)
	Third	Bjarne Riis (DEN)	(Gewiss–Ballan)
Jersey awarded to the points classification winner	Points	Laurent Jalabert (FRA)	(ONCE)
Jersey awarded to the mountains classification winner	Mountains	Richard Virenque (FRA)	(Festina–Lotus)
	Youth	Marco Pantani (ITA)	(Carrera Jeans–Tassoni)
	Combativity	Hernán Buenahora (COL)	(Kelme–Sureña)
	Team	ONCE	

The 1995 Tour de France was the 82nd Tour de France, taking place from 1 to 23 July. It was Miguel Induráin's fifth and final victory in the Tour. On the fifteenth stage Italian rider Fabio Casartelli died after an accident on the Col de Portet d'Aspet.

The points classification was won by Laurent Jalabert, while Richard Virenque won the mountains classification. Marco Pantani won the young rider classification, and ONCE won the team classification.

Lance Armstrong's best finish in the Tour de France became his 36th-place finish in this 1995 Tour de France, after his results from 1 August 1998 onward, including his seven Tour victories, were stripped on 24 August 2012 for blood doping.

== Teams ==
There were 21 teams in the 1995 Tour de France, each composed of 9 cyclists. The teams were selected in two rounds. In May 1995, the first fifteen teams were announced. In June, five wildcards were announced. Shortly before the start, Le Groupement folded because their team leader Luc Leblanc was injured, and because of financial problems. Their spot went to Aki–Gipiemme, the first team in the reserve list. Additionally, the organisation decided to invite one extra team: a combined team of Team Telekom and ZG Mobili, with six riders from Telekom and three from ZG Mobili.

The teams entering the race were:

Qualified teams

- Aki–Gipiemme
- Banesto
- Carrera Jeans–Tassoni
- Castorama
- Chazal–König
- Festina–Lotus
- GAN
- Gewiss–Ballan
- Lotto–Isoglass
- Mapei–GB–Latexco
- Mercatone Uno–Saeco
- MG Maglificio–Technogym
- Motorola
- Novell–Decca–Colnago
- ONCE

Invited teams

- Brescialat–Fago
- Kelme–Sureña
- Lampre–Panaria
- Polti–Granarolo–Santini
- Team Telekom/ZG Mobili–Selle Italia
- TVM–Polis Direct

== Pre-race favourites ==
Banesto's Indurain, the winner of the four previous Tours, was the clear favourite for the overall victory. His main challengers were expected to be Rominger from Mapei, Berzin from Gewiss and Zülle from ONCE.

== Route and stages ==
The 1995 Tour de France started on 1 July, and had two rest days, the first at 10 July when the cyclists were transferred from Seraing to Le Grand-Bornand, and the second on 17 July in Saint-Girons. The highest point of elevation in the race was 2,115 m (6,939 ft) at the summit of the Col du Tourmalet mountain pass on stage 15.

Stage characteristics and winners
Stage	Date	Course	Distance	Type	Winner
P	1 July	Saint-Brieuc	7.3 km (4.5 mi)	Individual time trial	Jacky Durand (FRA)
1	2 July	Dinan to Lannion	233.5 km (145.1 mi)	Plain stage	Fabio Baldato (ITA)
2	3 July	Perros-Guirec to Vitre	235.5 km (146.3 mi)	Plain stage	Mario Cipollini (ITA)
3	4 July	Mayenne to Alençon	67.0 km (41.6 mi)	Team time trial	(Italy) Gewiss–Ballan
4	5 July	Alençon to Le Havre	162.0 km (100.7 mi)	Plain stage	Mario Cipollini (ITA)
5	6 July	Fécamp to Dunkirk	261.0 km (162.2 mi)	Plain stage	Jeroen Blijlevens (NED)
6	7 July	Dunkirk to Charleroi (Belgium)	202.0 km (125.5 mi)	Plain stage	Erik Zabel (GER)
7	8 July	Charleroi (Belgium) to Liège (Belgium)	203.0 km (126.1 mi)	Hilly stage	Johan Bruyneel (BEL)
8	9 July	Huy (Belgium) to Seraing (Belgium)	54.0 km (33.6 mi)	Individual time trial	Miguel Induráin (ESP)
	10 July	Le Grand-Bornand		Rest day	
9	11 July	Le Grand-Bornand to La Plagne	160.0 km (99.4 mi)	Stage with mountain(s)	Alex Zülle (SUI)
10	12 July	La Plagne to Alpe d'Huez	162.5 km (101.0 mi)	Stage with mountain(s)	Marco Pantani (ITA)
11	13 July	Le Bourg-d'Oisans to Saint-Étienne	199.0 km (123.7 mi)	Hilly stage	Maximilian Sciandri (GBR)
12	14 July	Saint-Étienne to Mende	222.5 km (138.3 mi)	Hilly stage	Laurent Jalabert (FRA)
13	15 July	Mende to Revel	245.0 km (152.2 mi)	Plain stage	Serhiy Ushakov (UKR)
14	16 July	Saint-Orens-de-Gameville to Guzet-Neige	164.0 km (101.9 mi)	Stage with mountain(s)	Marco Pantani (ITA)
	17 July	Saint-Girons		Rest day	
15	18 July	Saint-Girons to Cauterets	206.0 km (128.0 mi)	Stage with mountain(s)	Richard Virenque (FRA)
16	19 July	Tarbes to Pau	237 km (147 mi)	Stage with mountain(s)	— (Note: Stage sixteen was raced non-competitively due to the death of Fabio Casartelli in the previous stage.)
17	20 July	Pau to Bordeaux	246.0 km (152.9 mi)	Plain stage	Erik Zabel (GER)
18	21 July	Montpon-Ménestérol to Limoges	166.5 km (103.5 mi)	Plain stage	Lance Armstrong (USA)
19	22 July	Lac de Vassivière	46.5 km (28.9 mi)	Individual time trial	Miguel Induráin (ESP)
20	23 July	Sainte-Geneviève-des-Bois to Paris (Champs-Élysées)	155.0 km (96.3 mi)	Plain stage	Djamolidine Abdoujaparov (UZB)
	Total		3,635 km (2,259 mi)		

== Race overview ==
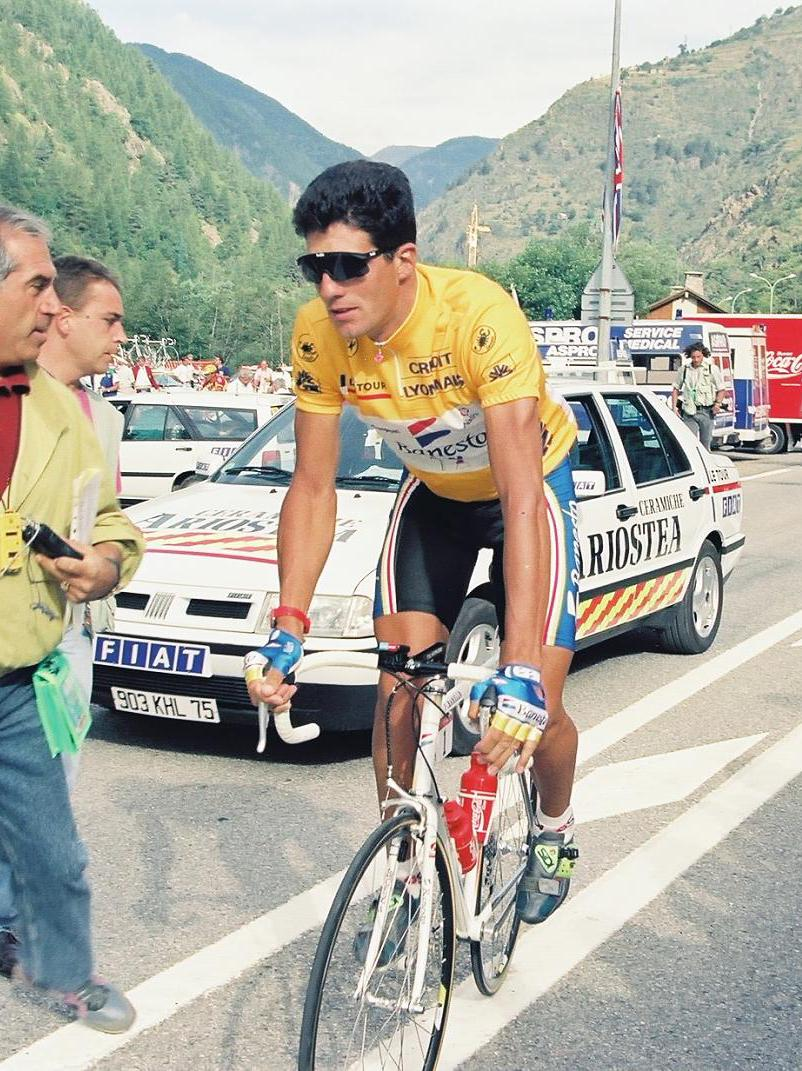
Miguel Induráin (pictured at the 1993 Tour), winner of the general classification

The first riders in the prologue rode in sunny weather, but then it started to rain, and the riders who started late had to ride on slippery roads. Chris Boardman, a big favourite for the prologue and an outsider for the overall classification, crashed during his ride, was then hit by his team's car, and had to abandon due to injury. The winner of the prologue was Jacky Durand, one of the early starters.

Durand stayed in the lead until the third stage, when Laurent Jalabert overtook him due to time bonuses won in intermediate sprints. Jalabert kept the yellow jersey for two stages, losing it due to a crash in the fourth stage. Ivan Gotti, member of the Gewiss-team that had won the team time trial in stage three, became the new leader. A surprising attack from Indurain in stage seven changed the standings. Indurain attacked in the hilly Ardennes, and only Johan Bruyneel was able to follow him. Indurain did all the work, creating a margin of almost one minute, and Bruyneel only followed him, but beat Indurain in the sprint, winning the stage and becoming the new leader. Indurain was now in second place in the general classification, and after winning the time trial in the eighth stage, he became the new leader. His closest rival in the overall classification was Bjarne Riis at 23 seconds, the others were more than two minutes behind.

The Tour then reached the high mountains in stage nine. Zülle escaped, and created a margin of several minutes. Indurain calmly chased him until the final climb, where he sped away from the others. Zülle won the stage and jumped to the second place in the overall classification, but Indurain won minutes on all other cyclists. The tenth stage was again in the high mountains. Pantani, already irrelevant for the overall classification, won the stage; behind him Indurain, Zülle and Riis finished together. Pantani set a new record for the final 13.8 kilometers up to Alpe d'Huez in 36 Minutes and 50 seconds, which remains the record to this day.

Stage twelve was not expected to be relevant for the general classification. But when Laurent Jalabert attacked early in the stage, this changed. Jalabert was a teammate of second-placed Zülle, and he was sixth in the general classification, more than nine minutes behind Indurain. Jalabert was joined by three other cyclists, of which two teammates. One of them, Melcior Mauri, was in eighth place, and was himself also a threat. The teammates worked together well, and when they were more than ten minutes ahead, Jalabert was the virtual leader. At that moment, Indurain's Banesto team and Riis' Gewiss team started to work together to close the gap. They reduced it to almost six minutes, which meant that Jalabert jumped to third place in the general classification. ONCE now had three cyclists in the top five: Zülle in second place, Jalabert in fourth place and Mauri in fifth place.

In stage thirteen Serhiy Utchakov and Lance Armstrong broke clear and were alone heading for the finish where Utchakov won the sprint. Armstrong was asked why he wasn't living up to expectations as far as competing with Indurain to which he replied that Indurain didn't finish his first two Tours and finished in the bottom half of several others before blossoming in to who he is. "They expect you to be with Miguel Induráin all the time and that's just... You just can't do that in a race like this. This is a man's race and it's hard for kid to compete."

The Pyrenées were reached in stage fourteen. Pantani again showed his strengths in the mountains, winning the stage. The other favourites stayed more or less together, so there were no big changes in the general classification.

In the fifteenth stage, Richard Virenque escaped early in the stage, reaching all six tops in the stage first, and won the stage. Behind him, several cyclists crashed on the descent of the Portet d'Aspet, including Fabio Casartelli. Casartelli's head hit a concrete barrier at high speed without wearing a helmet, and he was declared dead in the hospital.

Out of respect for Casartelli, the sixteenth stage was raced non-competitively. Casartelli's teammates from Motorola were allowed to cross the finish line first. The eighteenth stage was won by Lance Armstrong, a teammate of Casartelli. Armstrong dedicated this stage victory to Casartelli. Indurain was still leading firmly, and extended his lead by winning the last time trial.

== Classification leadership and minor prizes ==
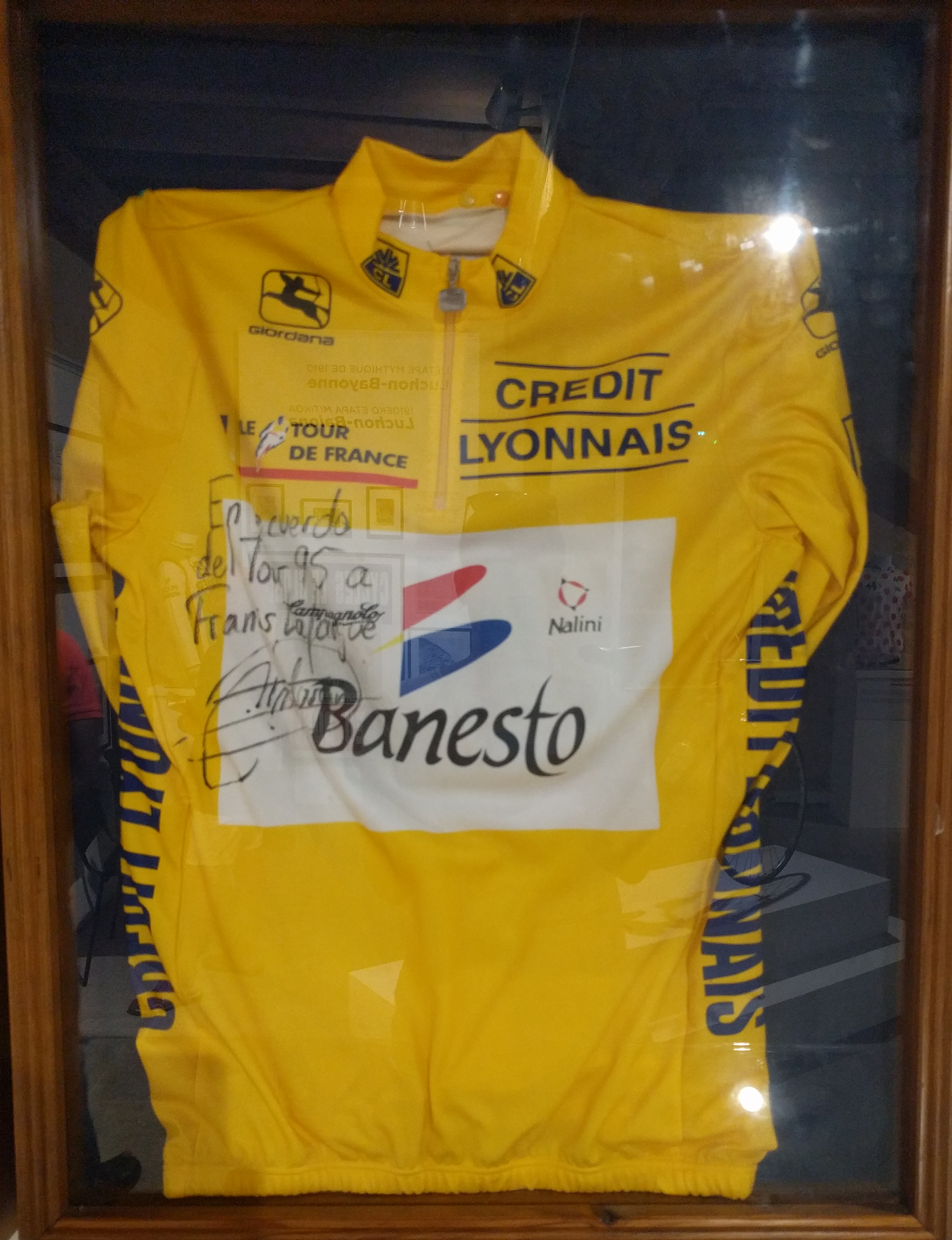
Miguel Induráin's yellow jersey of the 1995 Tour

There were several classifications in the 1995 Tour de France. The most important was the general classification, calculated by adding each cyclist's finishing times on each stage. The cyclist with the least accumulated time was the race leader, identified by the yellow jersey; the winner of this classification is considered the winner of the Tour.

Additionally, there was a points classification, which awarded a green jersey. In the points classification, cyclists got points for finishing among the best in a stage finish, or in intermediate sprints. The cyclist with the most points lead the classification, and was identified with a green jersey.

There was also a mountains classification. The organisation had categorised some climbs as either hors catégorie, first, second, third, or fourth-category; points for this classification were won by the first cyclists that reached the top of these climbs first, with more points available for the higher-categorised climbs. The cyclist with the most points lead the classification, and wore a white jersey with red polka dots.

The fourth individual classification was the young rider classification, which was not marked by a jersey. This was decided the same way as the general classification, but only riders under 26 years were eligible.

For the team classification, the times of the best three cyclists per team on each stage were added; the leading team was the team with the lowest total time.

In addition, there was a combativity award given after each mass-start stage to the cyclist considered most combative. The decision was made by a jury composed of journalists who gave points. The cyclist with the most points from votes in all stages led the combativity classification. Hernán Buenahora won this classification, and was given overall the super-combativity award. The Souvenir Henri Desgrange was given in honour of Tour founder Henri Desgrange to the first rider to pass the summit of the Col du Tourmalet on stage 15. This prize was won by Richard Virenque.

Classification leadership by stage
Stage	Winner	General classification	Points classification	Mountains classification	Young rider classification (Note: A white jersey was not awarded to the leader of the young rider classification between 1989 and 1999.)	Team classification	Combativity	
Stage	Winner	General classification	Points classification	Mountains classification	Young rider classification	Team classification	Award	Classification
P	Jacky Durand	Jacky Durand	Jacky Durand	Arsenio Gonzalez	Gabriele Colombo	Castorama	no award	
1	Fabio Baldato	Jacky Durand	Fabio Baldato	François Simon	Gabriele Colombo	Castorama	Erik Dekker	Erik Dekker
2	Mario Cipollini	Laurent Jalabert	Djamolidine Abdoujaparov	François Simon	Dirk Baldinger	Castorama	Eric Vanderaerden	Erik Dekker
3	Gewiss–Ballan	Laurent Jalabert	Djamolidine Abdoujaparov	François Simon	Gabriele Colombo	Gewiss–Ballan	no award	Erik Dekker
4	Mario Cipollini	Ivan Gotti	Mario Cipollini	François Simon	Evgeni Berzin	Gewiss–Ballan	Francisco Cabello	Erik Dekker
5	Jeroen Blijlevens	Ivan Gotti	Mario Cipollini	Dimitri Konyshev	Evgeni Berzin	Gewiss–Ballan	Rolf Järmann	Rolf Järmann
6	Erik Zabel	Bjarne Riis	Djamolidine Abdoujaparov	Dimitri Konyshev	Evgeni Berzin	Gewiss–Ballan	Herman Frison	Rolf Järmann
7	Johan Bruyneel	Johan Bruyneel	Laurent Jalabert	Richard Virenque	Evgeni Berzin	Gewiss–Ballan	Miguel Induráin	Miguel Induráin
8	Miguel Induráin	Miguel Induráin	Laurent Jalabert	Richard Virenque	Evgeni Berzin	Gewiss–Ballan	no award	Miguel Induráin
9	Alex Zülle	Miguel Induráin	Laurent Jalabert	Richard Virenque	Marco Pantani	ONCE	Alex Zülle	Alex Zülle
10	Marco Pantani	Miguel Induráin	Laurent Jalabert	Richard Virenque	Marco Pantani	ONCE	Laurent Brochard	Alex Zülle
11	Max Sciandri	Miguel Induráin	Laurent Jalabert	Richard Virenque	Marco Pantani	ONCE	Hernán Buenahora	Alex Zülle
12	Laurent Jalabert	Miguel Induráin	Laurent Jalabert	Richard Virenque	Marco Pantani	ONCE	Laurent Jalabert	Laurent Jalabert
13	Serguei Outschakov	Miguel Induráin	Laurent Jalabert	Richard Virenque	Marco Pantani	ONCE	Serguei Outschakov	Laurent Jalabert
14	Marco Pantani	Miguel Induráin	Laurent Jalabert	Richard Virenque	Marco Pantani	ONCE	Marco Pantani	Laurent Jalabert
15	Richard Virenque	Miguel Induráin	Laurent Jalabert	Richard Virenque	Marco Pantani	ONCE	Richard Virenque	Hernán Buenahora
16	—	Miguel Induráin	Laurent Jalabert	Richard Virenque	Marco Pantani	ONCE	no award	Hernán Buenahora
17	Erik Zabel	Miguel Induráin	Laurent Jalabert	Richard Virenque	Marco Pantani	ONCE	Thierry Marie	Hernán Buenahora
18	Lance Armstrong	Miguel Induráin	Laurent Jalabert	Richard Virenque	Marco Pantani	ONCE	Lance Armstrong	Hernán Buenahora
19	Miguel Induráin	Miguel Induráin	Laurent Jalabert	Richard Virenque	Marco Pantani	ONCE	no award	Hernán Buenahora
20	Djamolidine Abdoujaparov	Miguel Induráin	Laurent Jalabert	Richard Virenque	Marco Pantani	ONCE	Serhiy Utchakov	Hernán Buenahora
Final		Miguel Induráin	Laurent Jalabert	Richard Virenque	Marco Pantani	ONCE	Hernán Buenahora	

- In stage 1, Thierry Laurent wore the green jersey.
- Stage 16 was annulled after Fabio Casartelli died during stage 15. The peloton rode the stage slowly and allowed Casartelli's teammates, riding side-by-side, to cross the finish line first.

== Final standings ==
Legend
A yellow jersey.	Denotes the winner of the general classification	A green jersey.	Denotes the winner of the points classification
A white jersey with red polka dots.	Denotes the winner of the mountains classification		

=== General classification ===
Final general classification (1–10)
Rank	Rider	Team	Time
1	Miguel Induráin (ESP)	Banesto	92h 44' 59"
2	Alex Zülle (SUI)	ONCE	+ 4' 35"
3	Bjarne Riis (DEN)	Gewiss–Ballan	+ 6' 47"
4	Laurent Jalabert (FRA)	ONCE	+ 8' 24"
5	Ivan Gotti (ITA)	Gewiss–Ballan	+ 11' 33"
6	Melcior Mauri (ESP)	ONCE	+ 15' 20"
7	Fernando Escartín (ESP)	Mapei–GB–Latexco	+ 15' 49"
8	Tony Rominger (SUI)	Mapei–GB–Latexco	+ 16' 46"
9	Richard Virenque (FRA)	Festina–Lotus	+ 17' 31"
10	Hernán Buenahora (COL)	Kelme–Sureña	+ 18' 50"

Final general classification (11–115)
Rank	Rider	Team	Time
11	Claudio Chiappucci (ITA)	Carrera Jeans–Tassoni	+ 18' 55"
12	Laurent Madouas (FRA)	Castorama	+ 20' 37"
13	Marco Pantani (ITA)	Carrera Jeans–Tassoni	+ 26' 20"
14	Paolo Lanfranchi (ITA)	Brescialat–Fago	+ 29' 41"
15	Bruno Cenghialta (ITA)	Gewiss–Ballan	+ 29' 55"
16	Alvaro Mejia (COL)	Motorola	+ 33' 40"
17	Bo Hamburger (DEN)	TVM–Polis Direct	+ 34' 49"
18	Viatcheslav Ekimov (RUS)	Novell–Decca–Colnago	+ 39' 51"
19	Laurent Dufaux (SUI)	Festina–Lotus	+ 45' 55"
20	Erik Breukink (NED)	ONCE	+ 47' 27"
21	Vicente Aparicio (ESP)	Banesto	+ 52' 54"
22	Jean-Cyril Robin (FRA)	Festina–Lotus	+ 56' 01"
23	Arsenio Gonzalez (ESP)	Mapei–GB–Latexco	+ 56' 18"
24	Federico Muñoz (COL)	Kelme–Sureña	+ 1h 01' 03"
25	Vladimir Poulnikov (UKR)	Team Telekom/ZG Mobili–Selle Italia	+ 1h 01' 31"
26	Massimo Podenzana (ITA)	Brescialat–Fago	+ 1h 01' 54"
27	Laudelino Cubino (ESP)	Kelme–Sureña	+ 1h 02' 27"
28	Laurent Brochard (FRA)	Festina–Lotus	+ 1h 02' 45"
29	Beat Zberg (SUI)	Carrera Jeans–Tassoni	+ 1h 07' 08"
30	Yvon Ledanois (FRA)	GAN	+ 1h 14' 04"
31	Johan Bruyneel (BEL)	ONCE	+ 1h 18' 14"
32	Oscar Pelliccioli (ITA)	Polti–Granarolo–Santini	+ 1h 20' 13"
33	Alberto Elli (ITA)	MG Maglificio–Technogym	+ 1h 21' 34"
34	Jean-François Bernard (FRA)	Chazal–König	+ 1h 23' 11"
35	Herminio Diaz (ESP)	ONCE	+ 1h 23' 27"
36	Lance Armstrong (USA)	Motorola	+ 1h 28' 06"
37	Georg Totschnig (AUT)	Polti–Granarolo–Santini	+ 1h 30' 47"
38	Udo Bölts (GER)	Team Telekom/ZG Mobili–Selle Italia	+ 1h 31' 16"
39	Andrea Tafi (ITA)	Mapei–GB–Latexco	+ 1h 36' 49"
40	Ramon González (ESP)	Banesto	+ 1h 38' 04"
41	Gérard Rué (FRA)	Banesto	+ 1h 38' 11"
42	Enrico Zaina (ITA)	Carrera Jeans–Tassoni	+ 1h 38' 28"
43	Massimiliano Lelli (ITA)	Mercatone Uno–Saeco	+ 1h 39' 43"
44	Andrea Peron (ITA)	Motorola	+ 1h 42' 18"
45	Eddy Bouwmans (NED)	Novell–Decca–Colnago	+ 1h 44' 09"
46	Zenon Jaskuła (POL)	Aki–Gipiemme	+ 1h 53' 46"
47	Maximilian Sciandri (GBR)	MG Maglificio–Technogym	+ 1h 55' 10"
48	Franco Vona (ITA)	MG Maglificio–Technogym	+ 1h 55' 35"
49	Jesper Skibby (DEN)	TVM–Polis Direct	+ 1h 55' 43"
50	Leonardo Sierra (VEN)	Carrera Jeans–Tassoni	+ 1h 56' 17"
51	Gabriele Colombo (ITA)	Gewiss–Ballan	+ 1h 57' 14"
52	Maarten den Bakker (NED)	TVM–Polis Direct	+ 1h 58' 25"
53	Gianni Bugno (ITA)	MG Maglificio–Technogym	+ 1h 58' 47"
54	Andrea Ferrigato (ITA)	Team Telekom/ZG Mobili–Selle Italia	+ 2h 04' 51"
55	Didier Rous (FRA)	GAN	+ 2h 07' 39"
56	Djamolidine Abdoujaparov (UZB)	Novell–Decca–Colnago	+ 2h 08' 55"
57	Carmelo Miranda (ESP)	Banesto	+ 2h 08' 57"
58	Rolf Aldag (GER)	Team Telekom/ZG Mobili–Selle Italia	+ 2h 13' 41"
59	François Simon (FRA)	Castorama	+ 2h 15' 16"
60	Neil Stephens (AUS)	ONCE	+ 2h 16' 01"
61	Miguel Arroyo (MEX)	Chazal–König	+ 2h 19' 06"
62	Armand de Las Cuevas (FRA)	Castorama	+ 2h 19' 23"
63	Gilles Bouvard (FRA)	Chazal–König	+ 2h 24' 18"
64	Stephen Hodge (AUS)	Festina–Lotus	+ 2h 28' 17"
65	Alberto Volpi (ITA)	Gewiss–Ballan	+ 2h 28' 43"
66	Jens Heppner (GER)	Team Telekom/ZG Mobili–Selle Italia	+ 2h 30' 47"
67	Rolf Järmann (SUI)	MG Maglificio–Technogym	+ 2h 32' 14"
68	Fabian Jeker (SUI)	Festina–Lotus	+ 2h 38' 21"
69	José Ramon Uriarte (ESP)	Banesto	+ 2h 38' 22"
70	Erik Dekker (NED)	Novell–Decca–Colnago	+ 2h 38' 28"
71	Andrei Tchmil (UKR)	Lotto–Isoglass	+ 2h 39' 02"
72	Massimo Donati (ITA)	Mercatone Uno–Saeco	+ 2h 40' 04"
73	Johan Museeuw (BEL)	Mapei–GB–Latexco	+ 2h 41' 54"
74	Serhiy Utchakov (UKR)	Polti–Granarolo–Santini	+ 2h 42' 07"
75	Artūras Kasputis (LIT)	Chazal–König	+ 2h 45' 50"
76	Jim Van De Laer (BEL)	TVM–Polis Direct	+ 2h 45' 52"
77	Francesco Frattini (ITA)	Gewiss–Ballan	+ 2h 46' 11"
78	Marino Alonso (ESP)	Banesto	+ 2h 47' 25"
79	Dario Bottaro (ITA)	Gewiss–Ballan	+ 2h 47' 26"
80	Thomas Davy (FRA)	Banesto	+ 2h 49' 17"
81	Davide Perona (ITA)	Lampre–Panaria	+ 2h 51' 34"
82	Frankie Andreu (USA)	Motorola	+ 2h 52' 15"
83	Alessio Galletti (ITA)	Lampre–Panaria	+ 2h 52' 22"
84	Marcello Siboni (ITA)	Carrera Jeans–Tassoni	+ 2h 53' 16"
85	Marco Milesi (ITA)	Brescialat–Fago	+ 2h 54' 10"
86	Flavio Vanzella (ITA)	MG Maglificio–Technogym	+ 2h 54' 10"
87	Giancarlo Perini (ITA)	Brescialat–Fago	+ 2h 54' 18"
88	Wilfried Peeters (BEL)	Mapei–GB–Latexco	+ 2h 54' 38"
89	Guido Bontempi (ITA)	Gewiss–Ballan	+ 2h 55' 28"
90	Erik Zabel (GER)	Team Telekom/ZG Mobili–Selle Italia	+ 2h 56' 48"
91	Arvis Piziks (LAT)	Novell–Decca–Colnago	+ 2h 57' 55"
92	François Lemarchand (FRA)	GAN	+ 2h 58' 26"
93	José Angel Vidal (ESP)	Kelme–Sureña	+ 2h 58' 38"
94	Thierry Marie (FRA)	Castorama	+ 2h 58' 54"
95	Aitor Garmendia (ESP)	Banesto	+ 2h 59' 43"
96	Alexander Gontchenkov (UKR)	Lampre–Panaria	+ 3h 00' 25"
97	Frans Maassen (NED)	Novell–Decca–Colnago	+ 3h 01' 43"
98	Mario Scirea (ITA)	Polti–Granarolo–Santini	+ 3h 01' 55"
99	Mauro Bettin (ITA)	Aki–Gipiemme	+ 3h 04' 00"
100	Nicola Loda (ITA)	MG Maglificio–Technogym	+ 3h 04' 45"
101	Steve Bauer (CAN)	Motorola	+ 3h 05' 33"
102	Rossano Brasi (ITA)	Polti–Granarolo–Santini	+ 3h 06' 23"
103	Giovanni Lombardi (ITA)	Polti–Granarolo–Santini	+ 3h 06' 40"
104	Gilles Talmant (FRA)	Castorama	+ 3h 07' 19"
105	Peter Farazijn (BEL)	Lotto–Isoglass	+ 3h 09' 32"
106	Stefano Colagè (ITA)	Team Telekom/ZG Mobili–Selle Italia	+ 3h 10' 04"
107	Gian Matteo Fagnini (ITA)	Mercatone Uno–Saeco	+ 3h 12' 11"
108	Giovanni Fidanza (ITA)	Polti–Granarolo–Santini	+ 3h 12' 20"
109	Stephen Swart (NZL)	Motorola	+ 3h 14' 15"
110	Gianluca Gorini (ITA)	Aki–Gipiemme	+ 3h 14' 20"
111	Marco Serpellini (ITA)	Lampre–Panaria	+ 3h 16' 05"
112	Davide Cassani (ITA)	MG Maglificio–Technogym	+ 3h 16' 51"
113	Bart Voskamp (NED)	TVM–Polis Direct	+ 3h 17' 41"
114	Eros Poli (ITA)	Mercatone Uno–Saeco	+ 3h 21' 26"
115	Bruno Cornillet (FRA)	Chazal–König	+ 3h 36' 26"

=== Points classification ===
Final points classification (1–10)
Rank	Rider	Team	Points
1	Laurent Jalabert (FRA)	ONCE	333
2	Djamolidine Abdoujaparov (UZB)	Novell–Decca–Colnago	271
3	Miguel Induráin (ESP)	Banesto	180
4	Bjarne Riis (DEN)	Gewiss–Ballan	175
5	Erik Zabel (GER)	Team Telekom/ZG Mobili–Selle Italia	168
6	Giovanni Lombardi (ITA)	Polti–Granarolo–Santini	144
7	Bo Hamburger (DEN)	TVM–Polis Direct	103
8	Maximilian Sciandri (GBR)	MG Maglificio–Technogym	102
9	Andrea Ferrigato (ITA)	Team Telekom/ZG Mobili–Selle Italia	97
10	Andrei Tchmil (UKR)	Lotto–Isoglass	95

=== Mountains classification ===
Final mountains classification (1–10)
Rank	Rider	Team	Points
1	Richard Virenque (FRA)	Festina–Lotus	438
2	Claudio Chiappucci (ITA)	Carrera Jeans–Tassoni	214
3	Alex Zülle (SUI)	ONCE	205
4	Miguel Induráin (ESP)	Banesto	198
5	Hernán Buenahora (COL)	Kelme–Sureña	177
6	Marco Pantani (ITA)	Carrera Jeans–Tassoni	142
7	Laurent Dufaux (SUI)	Festina–Lotus	132
8	Fernando Escartín (ESP)	Mapei–GB–Latexco	121
9	Laurent Brochard (FRA)	Festina–Lotus	104
10	Federico Muñoz (COL)	Kelme–Sureña	101

=== Young rider classification ===
Final young rider classification (1–10)
Rank	Rider	Team	Time
1	Marco Pantani (ITA)	Carrera Jeans–Tassoni	93h 11' 19"
2	Bo Hamburger (DEN)	TVM–Polis Direct	+ 8' 29"
3	Beat Zberg (SUI)	Carrera Jeans–Tassoni	+ 40' 48"
4	Lance Armstrong (USA)	Motorola	+ 1h 01' 46"
5	Georg Totschnig (AUT)	Polti–Granarolo–Santini	+ 1h 03' 27"
6	Andrea Peron (ITA)	Motorola	+ 1h 15' 58"
7	Gabriele Colombo (ITA)	Gewiss–Ballan	+ 1h 30' 54"
8	Didier Rous (FRA)	Carrera Jeans–Tassoni	+ 1h 41' 19"
9	Erik Dekker (NED)	Novell–Decca–Colnago	+ 2h 12' 08"
10	Marco Milesi (ITA)	Brescialat–Fago	+ 2h 27' 50"

=== Team classification ===
Final team classification (1–10)
Rank	Team	Time
1	ONCE	278h 29' 35"
2	Gewiss–Ballan	+ 13' 23"
3	Mapei–GB–Latexco	+ 55' 53"
4	Festina–Lotus	+ 1h 17' 05"
5	Carrera Jeans–Tassoni	+ 1h 23' 31"
6	Banesto	+ 1h 54' 11"
7	Kelme–Sureña	+ 2h 01' 09"
8	Castorama	+ 3h 03' 39"
9	Motorola	+ 3h 17' 31"
10	Brescialat–Fago	+ 3h 28' 02"

=== Combativity classification ===
Final combativity classification (1–3)
Rank	Rider	Team	Points
1	Hernán Buenahora (COL)	Kelme–Sureña	36
2	Richard Virenque (FRA)	Festina–Lotus	30
3	Laurent Jalabert (FRA)	ONCE	30

== Bibliography ==
- Augendre, Jacques (2016). "Guide historique" [Historical guide] (PDF). Tour de France (in French). Paris: Amaury Sport Organisation. Archived (PDF) from the original on 17 August 2016.
- McGann, Bill; McGann, Carol (2008). The Story of the Tour de France: 1965–2007. Vol. 2. Indianapolis: Dog Ear Publishing. ISBN 978-1-59858-608-4.
- Nauright, John; Parrish, Charles (2012). Sports Around the World: History, Culture, and Practice. Vol. 2. Santa Barbara, California: ABC-CLI]. ISBN 978-1-59884-300-2.
- van den Akker, Pieter (2018). Tour de France Rules and Statistics: 1903–2018. Self-published. ISBN 978-1-79398-080-9.
