= Fabio Casartelli =

Italian cyclist

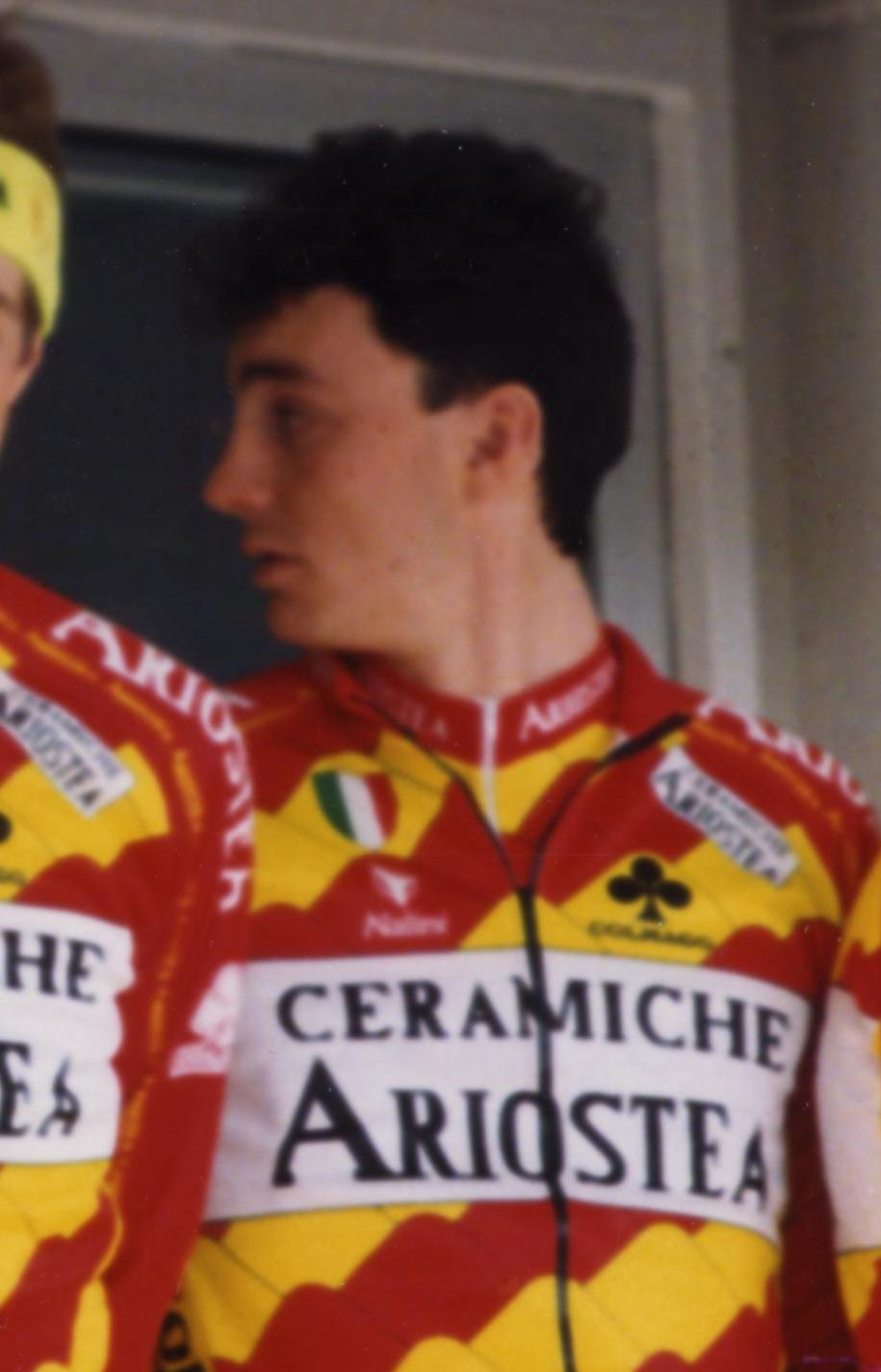
- Casartelli at the 1993 Paris–Nice

Personal information
- Born: 16 August 1970 Como, Italy
- Died: 18 July 1995 (aged 24) Col de Portet d'Aspet, France
- Height: 186 cm (6 ft 1 in)
- Weight: 72 kg (159 lb)

Cycling career
- Sport: Cycling
- Discipline: Road cycling
- Role: Rider

Professional teams
- 1993: Ariostea
- 1994: ZG Mobili
- 1995: Motorola

Major wins
- Gold medal, 1992 Olympics Individual road race
Medal record
Men's road bicycle racing
Representing Italy
Olympic Games
Gold medal – first place	1992 Barcelona	Individual road race

Fabio Casartelli (16 August 1970 – 18 July 1995) was an Italian cyclist and an Olympic gold medalist. He was killed in a crash on the descent of the Col de Portet d'Aspet, France, during the 15th stage of the 1995 Tour de France.

== Amateur career ==
Fabio Casartelli showed great promise as an amateur. He had many important wins and placings between 1990 and 1992, climaxing in winning a gold medal in the 1992 Summer Olympics road race. He finished the 194 km race in 4:35:21, a second ahead of Erik Dekker of the Netherlands and 3 ahead of Dainis Ozols of Latvia.

=== Amateur victories ===
1990

- Trofeo Sironi

1991

- Monte Carlo-Alassio
- Gemeli Meda
- Coppa Casale
- GP Capodarco di Fermo
- Trofeo Cesab

1992

- Olympic Road Race Championship
- Monte Carlo-Alassio
- GP Diano Marina
- Coppa Cigogna
- Trophia de Mare

== Professional career ==
Casartelli began his professional career in 1993 with the Ariostea team. He won a stage in the Settimana Bergamasca race, came second in a stage of the Tour de Suisse and finished the Giro d'Italia. In 1994 he moved to ZG-Mobili. For his third professional year, he moved to Team Motorola. He placed sixth in the Spanish Clásica de Almería and third in the second stage of the Spanish Tour of Murcia. Casartelli was selected to represent his team for the 1995 Tour de France along with Alvaro Mejia, Frankie Andreu, Lance Armstrong, Steve Bauer, Kaspars Ozers, Andrea Peron, Steve Swart and Sean Yates.

=== Professional results ===
1993 - Team Ariostea

- Giro d'Italia: 107th overall
- Settimana Bergamasca: first stage 1
- Tour de Suisse: second stage 5, third stage 2

1994 - Team ZG-Mobili Bottecchia

- Giro di Toscana: 15th overall

1995 - Team Motorola

- Classica Costa del Almeria: sixth overall
- Tour de Suisse: second stage 1
- Tour of Murcia: third stage 7

== Death ==
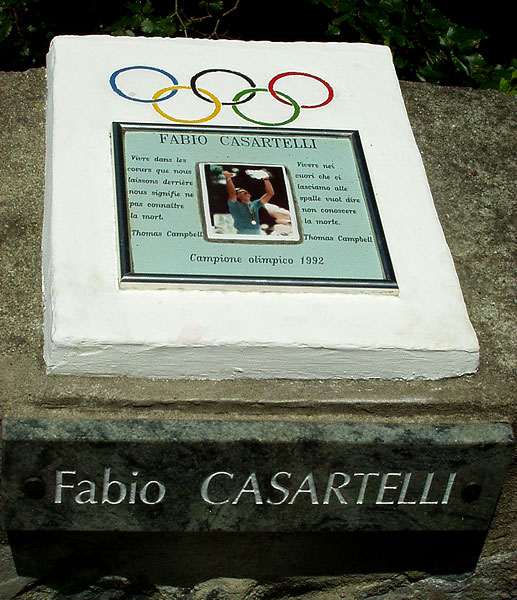
A plaque on Col de Portet d'Aspet where Casartelli died

On 18 July, during the fifteenth stage of the 1995 Tour de France, Casartelli and a few other riders crashed on the descent of the Col de Portet d'Aspet mountain pass in the Pyrenees. Casartelli's head struck the concrete blocks along the roadway, causing severe head injuries and loss of consciousness. Doctors arrived within ten seconds. While being flown to a local hospital by helicopter, Casartelli stopped breathing and after numerous resuscitation attempts was declared dead. It has been argued that Casartelli would have survived if he had been wearing a bicycle helmet. Gerard Porte, the Tour's senior doctor, claimed that protection was academic since the fatal blow was to an area of Casartelli's head that would not have been covered by a helmet. However Michel Disteldorf, the French doctor who examined Casartelli's body on behalf of the coroner in Tarbes, where the rider was flown by helicopter after he crashed, told the Sunday Times that the point of impact was on the top of the skull, and that had Casartelli been wearing a hard helmet "some injuries could have been avoided".

His Motorola team continued the Tour de France, crossing the finish line of the next stage first, side by side in Pau. The peloton followed behind, riding slowly. The Société du Tour de France awarded the stage prizes as normal, and the riders donated all the money won that day to a fund established for his family. The Tour later matched that amount, and thousands of individuals contributed to the fund.

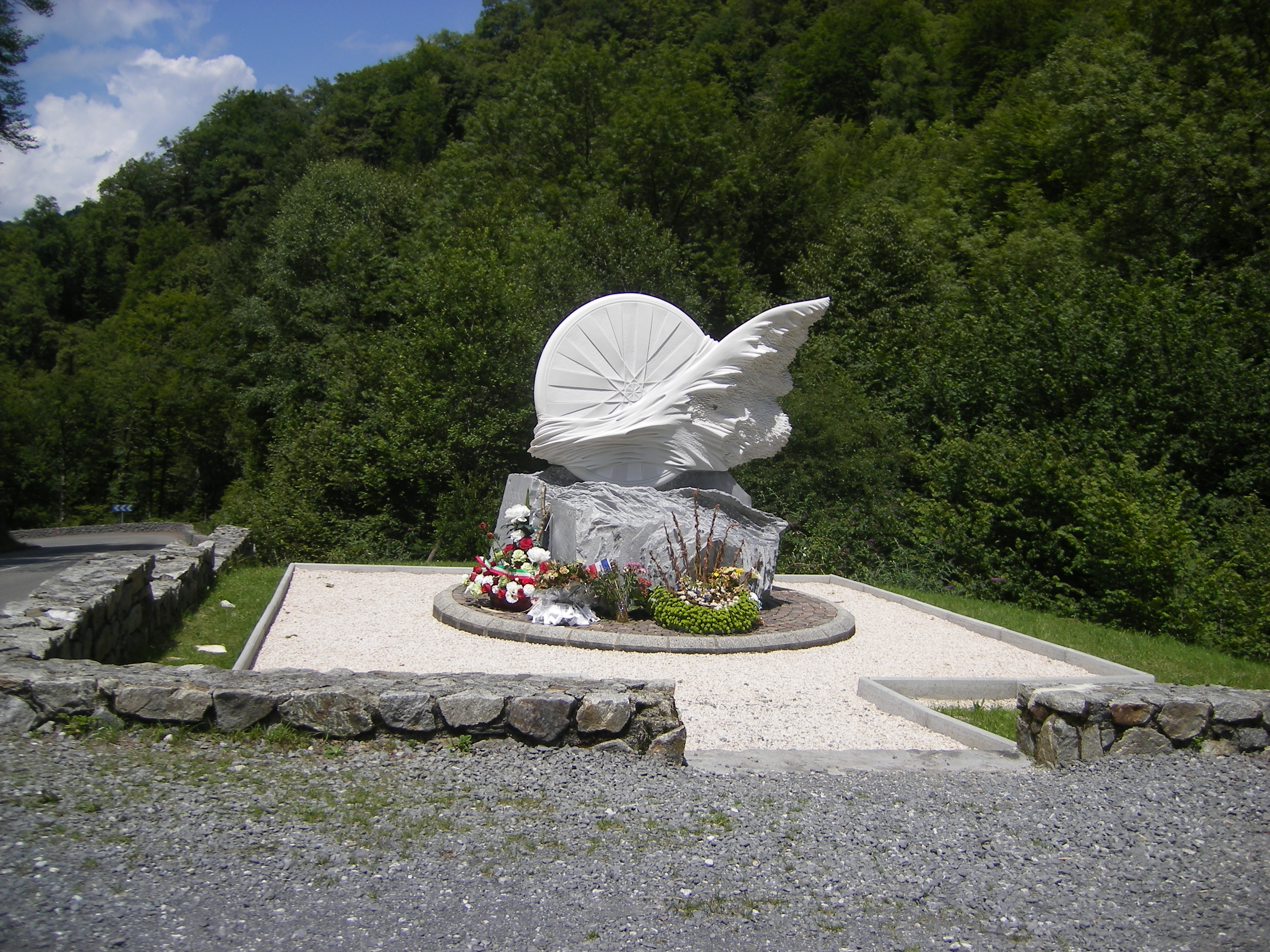
The monument to Casartelli on the Col de Portet d'Aspet

Three days after the accident, Casartelli's teammate Lance Armstrong dedicated his stage win in Limoges to Casartelli by pointing at the sky as he rode over the finish line.

The Société du Tour de France and the Motorola team placed a memorial near where he crashed. The memorial is a sundial arranged such that the sun's shadow highlights three dates — his birth and death and 2 August, the day he won his Olympic gold medal. The bicycle he was riding at the time of his fatal crash was placed in the chapel at the Madonna del Ghisallo, a church and museum to cyclists near his home.

In 1997, the young rider classification in the Tour de France was renamed "Souvenir Fabio Casartelli" in his honour.
