= Salvable =

2025 British drama film

- Theatrical release poster
- Directed by: Björn Franklin; Johnny Marchetta
- Screenplay by: Björn Franklin
- Produced by: Jamie Gamache; Connor O'Hara; Julien Loeffler; James Kermack
- Starring: Toby Kebbell; Shia LaBeouf; Kíla Lord Cassidy; Michael Socha; James Cosmo
- Cinematography: Simon Plunket
- Edited by: Shahnaz Dulaimy
- Music by: David Keenan
- Production companies: Lowkey Films; Featuristic Films
- Distributed by: Vertical
- Release dates: 2 May 2025 (United States); 14 July 2025 (United Kingdom)
- Running time: 101 minutes
- Country: United Kingdom
- Language: English

Salvable is a 2025 British boxing crime drama film directed by Björn Franklin and Johnny Marchetta, written by the former, and starring Toby Kebbell, Shia LaBeouf, Kíla Lord Cassidy, Michael Socha and James Cosmo. It was released theatrically on 2 May 2025 in the US.

== Plot ==
Sal, an aging prize fighter struggles to escape the grasp of a small town while battling a fractured relationship with his teenage daughter, when Vince, a nefarious criminal from his past comes back into this life and Sal risks falling back in with a dangerous crowd.

== Cast ==
- Toby Kebbell as Sal
- Shia LaBeouf as Vince
- Kíla Lord Cassidy as Molly
- James Cosmo as Welly
- Michael Socha as Little Michael
- Elaine Cassidy as Elaine
- Barry Ward as Paddy
- Nell Hudson as Becky
- Charlie Williams as Ryan McShane
- Jermaine Liburd as Oliver
- Carl Froch as Himself

== Production ==
The film is the debut feature of directing duo Franklin & Marchetta (Björn Franklin & Johnny Marchetta). Producers are Jamie Gamache and Connor O'Hara for Lowkey Films, and Julien Loeffler and James Kermack for Featuristic Films. Casting was completed by Aisling Knight at CBA Casting.

Former world champion boxer Carl Froch acted as boxing trainer for Toby Kebbell and Shia LaBeouf for the film. The cast also includes James Cosmo, Kíla Lord Cassidy, Elaine Cassidy, Michael Socha, Nell Hudson, Barry Ward and Jermaine Liburd. Froch also appears in the film in a cameo role.

Principal photography took place in Wales in April 2024. Filming locations included Barry, Wales, where several cast and crew members met residents and were given complimentary tattoos, including actor Socha.

== Music ==
The score for Salvable was written by composer David Keenan. David collaborated with composer Paul Gerard Campbell on the composition, arrangement, and production of the score. The songs featured in the score were produced and recorded by Pete Baldwin at Black Mountain Studios. The score and soundtrack were mixed by Marc Carolan at Black Shore Studio.

The soundtrack, featuring a selection of songs and cues from the score, was released by Silva Screen Records.

== Release ==
In February 2025, Grindstone Entertainment Group acquired the North American distribution rights to the film, while Vertical will oversee both the U.K. and Irish distribution. It was released theatrically on 2 May 2025. The film was released digitally in the United Kingdom on 14 July.

== Reception ==
On the review aggregator website Rotten Tomatoes, 50% of 20 critics' reviews are positive. Metacritic, which uses a weighted average, assigned the film a score of 54 out of 100, based on 6 critics, indicating "mixed or average" reviews.

Frank Scheck for The Hollywood Reporter remarked that the film might not break new ground but praised the "subtle" and "incisive" script as well as the photography. He commented that LaBeouf delivers a "quietly commanding performance", but reserved special praise for Kebbell who "makes us care deeply about his troubled character, a man who keeps getting in his own way" without "succumbing to the sort of histrionics to which a lesser actor might have resorted".
