= Kíla Lord Cassidy =

British child actress (born 2009)

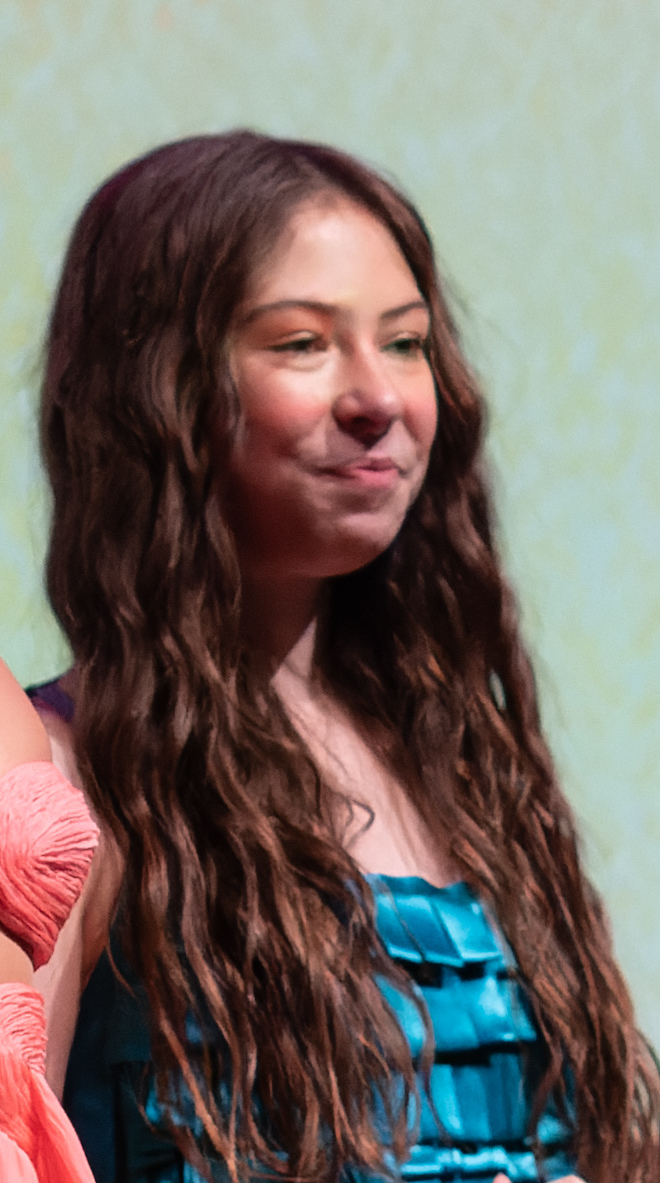
- Cassidy in 2022
- Born: 16 September 2009 (age 16)
- Occupation: Actress
- Years active: 2020–present
- Parents: Stephen Lord (father); Elaine Cassidy (mother)

Kíla Lord Cassidy is a British child actress. She is the daughter of Irish actress Elaine Cassidy and English actor Stephen Lord. she made her feature-length film debut in The Doorman (2020). Her film roles have included a breakthrough performance as Anna the Fasting girl in Ireland-set period drama film The Wonder (2022), for which she received a nomination for Breakthrough Performance at the British Independent Film Awards in December 2022.

== Career ==
She made her film debut in the 2020 feature The Doorman, as Lili at the age of nine year-old. In 2021, she could be seen as Caitlin, the daughter of Alexandra Roach in the British television series Viewpoint.

She had a breakthrough role when she was 13 years-old and starred as Anna the Fasting girl, in the 2022 film The Wonder, alongside Florence Pugh. However, Lord Cassidy was unable to attend the film premiere as it required an age 15+ certification. For her performance in the film she received a nomination at the British Independent Film Award for Breakthrough Performance in December 2022.

In 2024, she completed filming on upcoming period film Savage House, in which she appears alongside Claire Foy and Richard E Grant. She also filmed boxing drama Salvable, alongside Shia LaBeouf, in the spring of 2024. She has a voice acting role in 2025 animated film Spiked, which was produced in Luxembourg, and in which British actor Matthew Goode also appears in a voice acting role.

== Personal life ==
She is the daughter of actress Elaine Cassidy and actor Stephen Lord. She has one brother.

== Filmography ==
Key
†	Denotes films that have not yet been released

Year	Title	Role	Notes
2020	The Doorman	Lili	
2021	Viewpoint	Caitlin	Miniseries; 5 episodes
2022	The Wonder	Anna	
2025	Salvable	Molly	
2025	The Conjuring: Last Rites	Heather Smurl	
2026	Savage House	Fanny Savage	
