= Intruder (TV series) =

British police TV drama

Intruder is a 2021 television police procedural thriller four-part miniseries starring Sally Lindsay, Elaine Cassidy, Tom Meeten and Helen Behan. It was broadcast on Channel 5 on four consecutive nights from 5 April to 8 April 2021. The series revolves around a married couple (Cassidy and Meeten) living a perfect wealthy life in Cornwall, but after their house is burgled, they inadvertently kill one of the intruders. Sally Lindsay plays the police officer assigned to the case.
