= The Doorman (2020 film) =

2020 action thriller film

- Theatrical release poster
- Directed by: Ryuhei Kitamura
- Screenplay by: Lior Chefetz; Joe Swanson; Harry Winer
- Story by: Greg Williams; Matt McAllester
- Produced by: Harry Winer; Jason Moring; Michael Philip; Phin Glynn; Sara Shaak; Shayne Putzlocher
- Starring: Ruby Rose; Jean Reno; Aksel Hennie; Rupert Evans
- Cinematography: Matthias Schubert
- Music by: Aldo Shllaku
- Production companies: Double Dutch International; Smash Media; CR8IV DNA; Gora Films; Anamorphic Media; Immediate Media Partners
- Distributed by: Lionsgate Home Entertainment
- Release dates: October 1, 2020 (Russia); October 9, 2020 (United States)
- Running time: 97 minutes
- Country: United States
- Language: English
- Box office: $307,873 (International)

The Doorman is a 2020 American action thriller film directed by Ryuhei Kitamura. The film stars Ruby Rose, Aksel Hennie, Rupert Evans, and Jean Reno and follows a former Marine turned luxury apartment doorman who must protect her brother-in-law and his two children from a gang of ruthless criminals who are after a stash of precious artwork hidden in the walls somewhere in the building. The film was theatrically released in Russia on October 1, 2020, and released direct-to-digital in the United States on October 9, 2020. The film received negative reviews and grossed $307,873 from an international theatrical release.

== Plot ==
In Bucharest, U.S. Marine Gunnery Sergeant Alexandra “Ali” Gorski is tasked to protect a convoy carrying the daughter of the ambassador. Armed mercenaries ambush them, and although Ali fights fiercely and effectively, the mercenaries are still able to kill the ambassador, his wife and their daughter. Ali leaves the Marines and returns to New York City. Her uncle, Pat, tells her of a job in The Carrington Hotel in New York City where he works. Ali is hired, working alongside another doorman, Borz. She finds out that her late sister’s husband, Professor Jon Stanton, and his two children, Max and Lily, live there. Jon and Ali had an affair during the marriage, which she fled by joining the Marines. She is invited to their Easter dinner.

Over the Easter holiday, Borz kills Pat with a hammer, revealing that Borz has been disguised as a doorman to search for valuable paintings hidden in the hotel. A group of mercenaries led by Victor Dubois arrive and initiate a lockdown. Dubois, Borz, and his men invade the apartment of Bernard Hersch, who suffers akinetic mutism. Dubois knew Bernard as Erich Dreischler and asks where the paintings are. When Bernard does not speak, Borz stabs him in the hand, finally bringing Bernard around, even though he cannot recall the whereabouts of the paintings. When Bernard’s wife explains that they moved from 10 C after Bernard's stroke seven years earlier, the mercenaries leave for 10C — now occupied by the Stantons — before Borz kills Bernard and his wife.

Dubois and his men arrive at 10C and hold Jon and Lily hostage, while Max, seeing the men already inside, runs away. Dubois eventually discovers the hidden safe containing the paintings and has Martinez use a water cooled drill to bypass the combination code. Jon attempts to distract Dubois by having a glass of wine to allow Lily to use Dubois’ laptop to call for help via Facebook, but Borz catches her and Dubois forces her to delete the message.

After discovering the Hersch couple's corpses and Borz’s betrayal, Ali kills one henchman and runs into Max. Ali and Max activate the fire alarm to summon the fire department but as Ali tries to alert them, two other henchmen catch the two and the firefighters find nothing amiss and leave after Borz explains that it was a false alarm.

After Ali kills another henchman, Max is separated and is recaptured and brought to 10C. Dubois calls Ali over the PA system, ordering her to surrender herself. Seeing the water hose is connected to the drill bit, Max surreptitiously uses the PA system to send a Morse code message to Ali, asking her to disable the main valve of the water supply. Leo is killed by a nail bomb set by Ali while attempting to turn the water back on, destroying the main valve as well. Dubois radios her and threatens to kill the family if Ali refuses to restore the water supply. Ali agrees and, with corrupt NYPD officer Olsen (Dubois’ cohort) holding her at gunpoint, connects a hose to the rooftop water tank. The safe is opened, revealing the paintings. After Jon mentions that the art is worth hundreds of millions rather than $5 million as Dubois had told them, Borz renegotiates that 50% of the proceeds will go to Dubois while the remaining men, Martinez and Borz, will each receive a share of 25%. Ali kills Olsen and rushes to 10C, where she holds Martinez hostage. Borz wounds Jon and kills Martinez to increase his share to 50%.

As the police arrive at the scene, Borz dresses as a doorman to walk past the police and pins the blame on Ali, who incapacitates the officers and chases Borz. As they walk through a sewer, Borz turns on Dubois and kills him. Ali fights Borz and finally kills him with a grenade. Sometime later, Ali bids farewell to Jon and the children, who are heading to London.

== Cast ==
- Ruby Rose as Alexandra "Ali" Gorski
- Jean Reno as Victor Dubois
- Aksel Hennie as Borz Blasevic
- Rupert Evans as Jon Stanton
- Julian Feder as Max Stanton
- Kíla Lord Cassidy as Lily Stanton
- Louis Mandylor as Martinez
- Dan Southworth as "Pee-Wee"
- Hideaki Itô as Leo
- David Sakurai as Andre

== Production ==
In February 2019, Ruby Rose was announced as the film's lead, with filming expected to begin in April 2019. In May 2019, it was announced that Jean Reno, Rupert Evans, Aksel Hennie, Julian Feder, Hideaki Ito, and David Sakurai had joined the cast. Principal filming took place in Romania, with secondary filming in New York City. In February 2020, a first-look at Rose's character was released online.

== Release ==
=== Theatrical and home media ===
On October 9, 2020, the film was released direct-to-digital alongside its world premiere on the Nightstream Film Festival. In the United States and Canada, the DVD earned $80,779 and the Blu-ray earned $1.3 million, totaling $1.4 million in domestic video sales. The film was given a theatrical release in eight international countries and grossed $307,873.

=== Critical response ===
On Rotten Tomatoes, the film holds an approval rating of 24% based on 29 reviews, with an average rating of 4.2/10. The site's critical consensus reads, "Don't bother knocking, action fans: The Doorman only leads the way to an assortment of tired clichés that serve as bittersweet reminders of better films." On Metacritic, the film has a weighted average score of 41 out of 100, based on 4 critics, indicating "mixed or average" reviews.

John DeFore from The Hollywood Reporter called the film a "Die Hard ripoff that forgets most of the lessons that action classic has to teach, Ryuhei Kitamura's The Doorman forgets first of all what a little bit — even a shred — of wit can do for a movie that otherwise relies on bullets and brawn." Ben Coleman from Portland Mercury also compared the film to Die Hard and praised Kitamura's "clever camerawork and a few echos of the old razzle-dazzle", but stated, "there’s just not a ton to write home about beyond some reasonably inventive set pieces and a fight scene involving priceless renaissance art." Thomas Stonehand-Judge from Movies For Reel awarded the film one and a half stars out of five, stating that the film "brings nothing new to the table. It’s easy to predict where the story is going, what’s going to happen to each character, and when something is being introduced to be just to be reused later in the film" and that its flaws "could render this movie dead on arrival for others." Meagan Navarro from Bloody Disgusting awarded the film one skull out of five, stating, "It’s challenging to make an action thriller this bland, but The Doorman succeeds. Lifeless performances, a silly script that feels pastiche, and uninspired action and fight choreography make for one of the most maddening viewing experiences of the year."
