= Little White Lie (2008 film) =

- Genre: Drama
- Created by: Stuart Carolan and Barry Murphy and Element Pictures
- Directed by: Nick Renton
- Starring: Andrew Scott; Elaine Cassidy
- Country of origin: Ireland
- Original language: English
- No. of episodes: 1

Original release
- Network: RTÉ One
- Release: 4 August 2008

Little White Lie is a feature-length IFTA-nominated Irish television romantic drama television film broadcast on RTÉ One on 4 August 2008 at 21:30. It stars Andrew Scott and Elaine Cassidy. The drama follows the journey of a dejected actor (Scott) as he searches for love after being discarded by his highflying girlfriend. The title comes from the fact that the main character tells one to his new girlfriend (Cassidy) - that he is a psychiatrist instead of an actor. Little White Lie is written by Stuart Carolan and Barry Murphy and directed by Nick Renton. It is produced by Element Pictures, which previously produced Bitter Sweet and Prosperity for RTÉ. The drama featured music from the artist Julie Feeney. The song "You Broke the Magic" was taken from the Choice Music Prize-winning 13 songs.

== Synopsis ==
Little White Lie follows the story of a luckless actor named Barry who has recently split from his girlfriend. He is seen wallowing at home in his pyjamas, where he becomes fixated on a children's television presenter who he sees on daytime television. The two accidentally collide at an awards ceremony and Barry sets out to impress the presenter. However, he inadvertently lies about his profession, ignoring his actorial status for a career in psychiatry.

== Reaction ==
One-in-four of the Irish population watched Little White Lie which was aired over a bank holiday weekend. The average audience share was 336,000 or 26.5% of available viewers, labelled as a "disappointing turn-off" by the tabloid Evening Herald which pinpointed the "considerable hype" and advertising efforts which had taken place in the preceding weeks. However, a spokeswoman for RTÉ said that the show "seemed to go down well with viewers" and pointed out that it had hit a peak of 450,000. Another RTÉ spokesperson defended the ratings, saying that "this was a drama and would not be comparable to other programmes on this usual slot on a Monday night". The drama seemed to disappoint viewers and critics alike, as visible in newspaper reports and on online discussion boards shortly after the broadcast. However the programme went on to be nominated for an IFTA against Whistleblower in the Single Drama/Drama Serial category in January 2009.
