= Andrea Peron (cyclist, born 1971) =

Italian cyclist

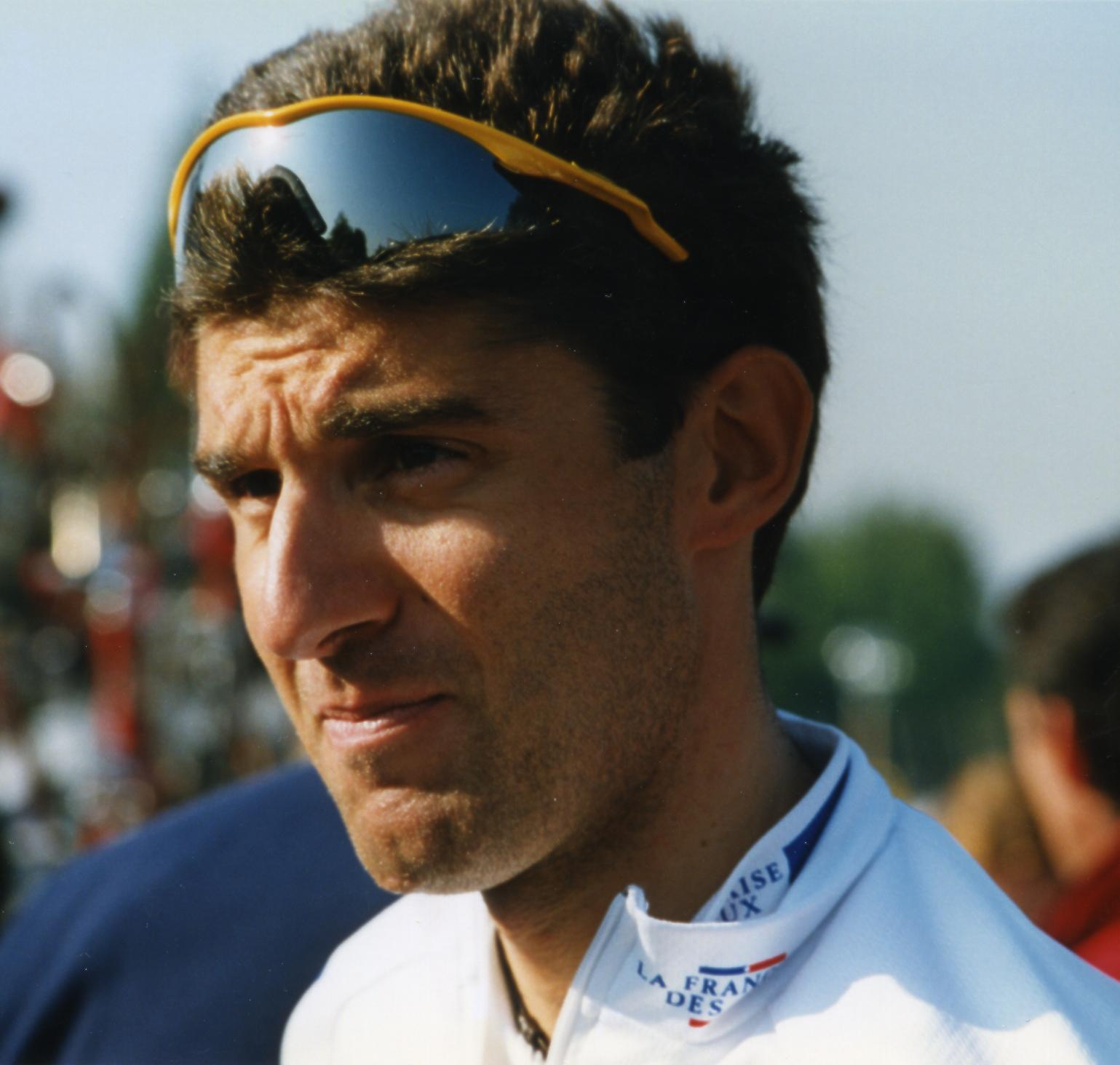

Personal information
- Full name: Andrea Peron
- Born: 14 August 1971 (age 55) Varese, Italy
- Height: 1.83 m (6 ft 0 in)
- Weight: 70 kg (154 lb; 11 st 0 lb)

Cycling career
- Sport: Cycling
- Current team: Retired
- Discipline: Road
- Role: Rider
- Rider type: Domestique

Professional teams
- 1993: Gatorade
- 1994: Polti
- 1995-1996: Motorola
- 1997-1998: La Française des Jeux
- 1999: ONCE-Deutsche Bank
- 2000-2001: Fassa Bortolo
- 2002-2006: Team CSC
Medal record
Men's road bicycle racing
Representing Italy
Olympic Games
| Silver medal – second place | 1992 Barcelona | Team Road Race |

Andrea Peron (born 14 August 1971) is an Italian former professional road bicycle racer. He competed in the team time trial at the 1992 Summer Olympics winning a silver medal. Peron turned professional in 1993, riding for team Gatorade. He is best remembered for leading the sombre peloton across the finish line in the neutralised Stage 16 of the 1995 Tour de France, the day after the death of his team- and roommate Fabio Casartelli in a fall.

He was a strong time trialist, with good results in the Italian championships, as well as a 5th place at the 1996 World Time Trial Championships. From 2002 until his retirement in 2006, he was a domestique on Team CSC. In January 2010 he joined Garmin–Transitions as assistant general manager.

== Drug use allegations ==
Before the 2004 Tour de France, rumours surfaced in the French newspaper Le Monde that Peron, alongside other riders, was still under suspicion for doping following a police raid in Sanremo, Italy in June 2001. This would prevent Andrea Peron from competing in the 2004 Tour de France, as the race organizers did not want any riders under with ongoing trials competing in their race. However, Peron's case had already been closed in December 2003. He had been acquitted for having four painkillers containing caffeine, of which Andrea Peron had used none. The pills had a level of caffeine below the maximum limit allowed by the UCI, the governing body of cycling. Indeed, Peron had already partaken in the 2003 Tour de France the year prior without any complications.

== Major results ==
1992
1st Piccolo Giro di Lombardia
7th Overall, Peace Race

1st Stage 2

1994
2nd Overall, Hofbräu Cup

1st Stage 3

3rd Overall, Tour DuPont

1st Stage 8

1st Hamilton Classic
61st Overall, 1994 Tour de France
1995
3rd Overall, Tour DuPont

1st Stage 2

1st Thrift Drug Classic
6th Overall Vuelta a Murcia
44th Overall, 1995 Tour de France
1996
1st Overall, Vuelta a Castilla y León

1st Stage 1
1st Points competition

1st Mountain competition, Three Days of De Panne
5th UCI Road World Championships, Time Trial
8th Overall, Vuelta a España
1997
56th Overall, 1997 Tour de France
1998
7th Liège–Bastogne–Liège
1999
10th Overall, 1999 Tour de France
2000
4th Trofeo Matteotti
2001
1st Italian National Time Trial Championships
2002
53rd Overall, 2002 Tour de France
2003
1st Firenze–Pistoia
54th Overall, 2003 Tour de France
2004
64th Overall, 2004 Tour de France
2005
1st Trofeo Città di Borgomanero (with Ivan Basso)
