= Bruno Thibout =

French cyclist

Personal information
- Born: 8 May 1969 (age 57) Neufchâtel-en-Bray, France

Cycling career
- Sport: Cycling
- Role: Rider

Bruno Thibout (born 8 May 1969) is a French former professional racing cyclist. He rode in three editions of the Tour de France, three editions of the Vuelta a España and two editions of the Giro d'Italia. Having ridden for the Castorama, Motorola and Cofidis teams, in retirement he has worked as a motorbike rider for the ASO during the Tour de France.
