= Arsenio González =

Spanish cyclist

Personal information
- Full name: Arsenio González Gutiérrez
- Born: 9 March 1960 (age 66) Yudego, Spain
- Height: 1.84 m (6 ft 1/2 in)
- Weight: 62 kg (137 lb; 9 st 11 lb)

Cycling career
- Sport: Cycling
- Current team: Retired
- Discipline: Road
- Role: Rider

Professional teams
- 1983–1986: Kelme
- 1987–1990: Teka
- 1991–1993: CLAS–Cajastur
- 1994–1996: Mapei
- 1997–1998: Kelme

Arsenio González Gutiérrez (born 9 March 1960 in Yudego) is a former Spanish cyclist. He was a professional cyclist from 1983 to 1998.

== Palmarès ==
1982
1st Volta da Ascension

1983
1st Stage 5b Vuelta a Cantabria
2nd overall Vuelta a La Rioja

1987
3rd overall Prueba Villafranca de Ordizia

1988
1st Stage 5 Volta a Catalunya

1989
2nd overall GP Torres Vedras

1st Stage 6

1990
3rd overall GP Torres Vedras

1996
1st Circuito de Getxo
1st Clásica Sabiñánigo
2nd overall Prueba Villafranca de Ordizia

== Grand Tour Results ==
=== Tour de France ===
- 1988: 97th
- 1992: 20th
- 1993: DNF
- 1994: 40th
- 1995: 23rd
- 1996: 24th
- 1997: DNF

=== Vuelta a España ===
- 1983: 33rd
- 1984: 50th
- 1985: 35th
- 1986: 43rd
- 1991: 52nd
- 1992: 24th
- 1993: 23rd
- 1994: 24th
- 1996: 36th
- 1997: 47th
- 1998: 31st

=== Giro d'Italia ===
- 1995: 21st
- 1997: 52nd
- 1998: 55th
