= Stephen Swart =

New Zealand cyclist (born 1965)

Personal information
- Born: 5 January 1965 (age 61) New Zealand

Cycling career
- Sport: Cycling
- Current team: Retired
- Discipline: Road
- Role: Rider

Professional teams
- 1987: ANC–Halfords
- 1988: S.E.F.B.–Peugeot–Tönissteiner
- 1989–1993: Coors Light–ADR
- 1994–1995: Motorola
Medal record
Representing New Zealand
Men's Track cycling
Commonwealth Games
Silver medal – second place	1986 Edinburgh	4000m Team Pursuit

Stephen Swart (born Auckland, 5 January 1965) is a former New Zealand cyclist. He began his professional career with British team, ANC-Halfords and rode the 1987 Tour de France with them. After the ANC team folded later that year, he rode for American teams.

With the Motorola team, he participated in the 1994 and 1995 Tour de France. He won the Herald Sun Tour (Australia) and the Tour of Canada.

Swart's older brother, Jack, was a top amateur cyclist.

In the 1986 Commonwealth Games he competed in the 4000m team pursuit, the team came second for silver; and in the 4000m individual pursuit.

== Doping and cheating revelations ==
Prompted by his son's taking up racing, Swart spoke up about doping in cycling. He described Lance Armstrong, his Motorola teammate, as one of the strongest advocates of doping when the team decided to dope. “He was the instigator,” Swart told Sports Illustrated. “It was his words that pushed us toward doing it.” Swart also described his own doping.

When he initially made his disclosures, he was vilified and called a loser. Later, in 2012, he was named the 'New Zealander of the Year' for having told the truth.

Swart also testified, under oath in 2006, that he was paid $50,000 to lose a race, by Armstrong.

== Major results ==
1988
8th Fleche Hesbignonne
9th Grand Prix de Plumelec-Morbihan
1989
7th Philly Cycling Classic
1991
6th Thrift Drug Classic
1992
1st United States National Criterium Championships
1st Stage 3 Tour of the Adirondacks
2nd Overall Celestial Bicycle Classic

1st Stages 1 & 2

5th Overall Herald Sun Tour

1st Stages 10 & 11

1993
1st Stage 11 Herald Sun Tour
1994
9th Wincanton Classic
1995
4th Overall Tour of Luxembourg

Grand Tour general classification results timeline
Grand Tour	1987	1988	1989	1990	1991	1992	1993	1994	1995
Giro d'Italia	—	—	—	—	—	—	—	—	—
Tour de France	DNF	—	—	—	—	—	—	112	109
Vuelta a España	—	—	—	—	—	—	—	—	—
