= Frankie Andreu =

American cyclist

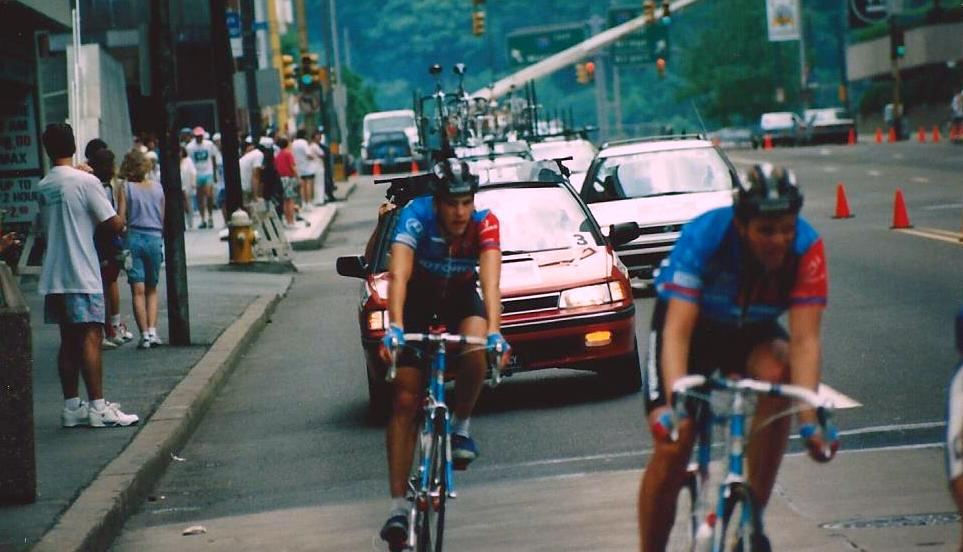
- Andreu (left) and Ron Kiefel during the 1991 Thrift Drug Classic

Personal information
- Full name: Francisco Andreu
- Born: September 26, 1966 (age 60) Dearborn, Michigan, U.S.
- Height: 6 ft 2 in (1.88 m)
- Weight: 172 lb (78 kg)

Cycling career
- Sport: Cycling
- Discipline: Road
- Role: Rider
- Rider type: Sprinter

Professional teams
- 1989: Wheaties–Schwinn
- 1989–90: 7 Eleven
- 1991–1996: Motorola
- 1997: Cofidis
- 1998–2000: U.S. Postal Service cycling team

Francisco "Frankie" Andreu (born September 26, 1966) is an American former professional cyclist whose career highlights include riding as team captain of the U.S. Postal Service cycling team in 1998, 1999 and 2000. During his career, he won a number of race stages and finished fourth in the cycling road race at the 1996 Olympics. His testimony played a key part in the United States Anti-Doping Agency's investigation of fellow U.S. Postal cyclist Lance Armstrong's doping practices.

== Cycling career ==
Andreu was born in Dearborn, Michigan. He began his cycling career in track cycling, with Wolverine Sports Club in Detroit, winning the individual pursuit during the 1984 Junior National Track Cycling Championships in Trexlertown, Pennsylvania. In 1985, he finished first in the Madison during the National Track Cycling Championships in Indianapolis, Indiana and second in the points race and team pursuit. In 1988, he qualified as a member of the United States cycling team for that year's Olympic Games, where he finished eighth in the points race.

Andreu moved from track cycling to road cycling after signing to the 7-Eleven Pro Cycling Team in 1989 when he finished his first professional stage race, the Giro d'Italia. His highest finish in the Tour de France was second during the 18th stage of the 1993 race where he was teammates with a young Lance Armstrong on the Motorola Pro cycling team. Andreu finished fourth in the road race during the 1996 Olympic Games in Atlanta.

He is best remembered by the professional cycling community for his role as a super domestique.

== Performance-enhancing drug use ==
In a September 2006 interview given to The New York Times, Andreu admitted that he had taken the performance-enhancing drug erythropoietin (EPO) to help prepare for the 1999 Tour de France. Andreu said that he was introduced to performance-enhancing drugs in 1995 while he was riding for Motorola.

Andreu gave more details in his September 2012 USADA affidavit declaring he used EPO in 1998 as he traveled preparing for the 1999 Tour. Andreu declared he knowingly received EPO injections in 1999 after races by the USPS Team doctor, Luis Garcia del Moral. His wife, Betsy, became suspicious when she watched her husband pull Armstrong through the Alps at Sestriere during the ninth stage of the 1999 Tour, which paved the way for Armstrong to win the first of his seven titles. She knew that Frankie was a sprinter, not a climber; normally, it would have been all he could do to finish a mountain stage. Her suspicions were confirmed shortly after the Tour, when she found a thermos with EPO in their refrigerator. Betsy questioned Andreu about the drugs and was very upset. In a signed affidavit to the U.S. Anti-Doping Agency (USADA), Andreu testified he responded to his wife by saying: "You don't understand. This is the only way I can keep up in the Tour." Betsy then told her husband that if he needed to dope to be on the USPS team, he shouldn't be riding for it.

Andreu continued to ride strongly for the USPS Team in 2000 and to serve as the team's Assistant Director in 2001 and 2002.

== Armstrong testimony ==
In 2005, Andreu and his wife Betsy testified that Lance Armstrong told cancer doctors in their presence in 1996 he had doped with EPO (erythropoietin), growth hormone and steroids. This took place after Frankie Andreu began using performance-enhancing drugs himself in 1995. The Andreus' testimony was intended to remain sealed in court documents and is among thousands of pages of documents related to litigation between Armstrong and a Texas-based company that was attempting to withhold a $5 million bonus. Armstrong swore under oath it didn't happen. Frankie Andreu never offered information to media sources on the topic until court documents were released. He then stood by his testimony when giving interviews. A settlement was reached in February 2006 before the three-person arbitration panel made a ruling. As part of the settlement, SCA Promotions paid Armstrong and Tailwind Sports $7.5 million, to cover the $5-million bonus plus interest and lawyers' fees. In a statement, Armstrong said, "It's over. We won. They lost. I was yet again completely vindicated." Armstrong's statement also suggested that Betsy Andreu may have been confused by possible mention of his post-operative treatment which included steroids and EPO that are routinely taken to counteract wasting and red-blood-cell destroying effects of intensive chemotherapy. In that period of time, the Andreus claim to have received threatening messages on their answering machine left by Stephanie McIlvain, the Oakley representative for Armstrong. In one of them, she stated that she hopes someone "breaks a baseball bat over your [Betsy's] head", among other threats. In 2012, the Andreus participated in the USADA investigation into Armstrong's doping practices, testifying along with 24 other witnesses, including former Armstrong teammates. Armstrong did not contest the doping charges, was banned for life from competing and was stripped of all results from August 1, 1998, onward, including his seven Tour de France titles. In the USADA's 200 page "Reasoned decision", the hospital room incident where the Andreus heard Armstrong say to his doctor that he took performance-enhancing drugs was covered in great details in the "Addendum Part 2".

In a January 2013 interview, Lance Armstrong finally admitted that he had used performance-enhancing drugs for much of his professional career, including all seven of his Tour de France wins. In response to being asked if the 1996 claims by the Andreus were true, he responded; "Um, I’m not gonna take that on. I’m laying down on that one". He also admitted to describing Betsy as a "crazy bitch".

== Post-racing career ==
Andreu has served as a bicycle race commentator for Universal Sports on the Versus television network since retiring from professional cycling in 2001 and remains active in domestic pro racing, often lending his voice and knowledge announcing for professional races. Frankie also served as the official voice of the USA CRITS Series on USACRITS.tv.

In 2007, Andreu became the director of Rock Racing, but resigned in January 2008 stating differences "with business strategies and the direction the team is headed". When Andreu started out with Rock Racing, he described in a Cycling News interview how attitudes in cycling had changed, and that it was no longer acceptable to use drugs. A year later, it was clear that there were differences between him and the owner of Rock & Republic jeans, Michael Ball. Andreu was unhappy that his role as a director was being undermined; in some instances, he was not consulted before riders were signed. Many of the riders, including Tyler Hamilton, Santiago Botero, Óscar Sevilla and Mario Cipollini, were involved in or linked to drug investigations in cycling. This raised eyebrows, especially when aligned with Ball's "win or you're fired" mentality.

"Rider choices, sponsor choices, the way they were handling the prospective sponsors... they are an aggressive team and everything they do is aggressive. The cycling community is small and to me it is important to keep friends and not win at all costs."

Andreu was working with the American women's cycling team, Proman, in 2008. The team hoped to draw attention to women's cycle racing with Andreu's leadership.

In 2010, Andreu took the position of directeur sportif for the Kenda Pro Cycling team, a UCI Continental team sponsored by 5-hour Energy.

Andreu was also identified as the only American that Lance Armstrong would allow to interview him in Alex Gibney's documentary The Armstrong Lie.

== Major results ==
1986
1st Team pursuit, National Amateur Track Championships
1991
8th Overall Vuelta a Andalucía
8th Paris–Tours
1992
7th Tour du Haut Var
1993
7th Omloop Het Volk
1994
1st Stage 7 Tour de Pologne
4th Wincanton Classic
9th Paris–Roubaix
1996
4th Road race, Olympic Games
1997
1st Stage 6 Mi-Août en Bretagne
1998
1st Lancaster Classic
1st Stage 5 Tour du Luxembourg
2000
8th Overall Paris–Nice

== See also ==
- List of doping cases in cycling
- List of sportspeople sanctioned for doping offences
