= List of teams and cyclists in the 1996 Tour de France =

List of cyclists

For the 1996 Tour de France, the 18 teams on top of the UCI rankings at the start of 1996 were automatically invited for the Tour. These were:

Four wildcards were given, for a total of 22 teams:

== Teams ==
Qualified teams

- Banesto
- ONCE
- Team Telekom
- Mapei–GB
- MG Maglificio–Technogym
- Gewiss Playbus
- Motorola
- Festina–Lotus
- Rabobank
- GAN
- Saeco–AS Juvenes San Marino
- Team Polti
- Panaria–Vinavil
- Carrera Jeans–Tassoni
- Roslotto–ZG Mobili
- TVM–Farm Frites
- Refin–Mobilvetta
- Lotto

Invited teams

- Kelme–Artiach
- Brescialat
- Agrigel–La Creuse–Fenioux
- Aubervilliers 93

== Cyclists ==
=== By starting number ===
Legend
| No. | Starting number worn by the rider during the Tour |
| Pos. | Position in the general classification |
| DNF | Denotes a rider who did not finish |

| No. | Name | Nationality | Team | Pos. | Ref |
|---|---|---|---|---|---|
| 1 | Miguel Induráin | Spain | Banesto | 11 | |
| 2 | Marino Alonso | Spain | Banesto | 66 | |
| 3 | Vicente Aparicio | Spain | Banesto | DNF-17 | |
| 4 | José Luis Arrieta | Spain | Banesto | 32 | |
| 5 | Prudencio Induráin | Spain | Banesto | 58 | |
| 6 | José María Jiménez | Spain | Banesto | 57 | |
| 7 | Carmelo Miranda | Spain | Banesto | DNF-4 | |
| 8 | Orlando Rodrigues | Portugal | Banesto | 54 | |
| 9 | José Ramón Uriarte | Spain | Banesto | 92 | |
| 11 | Laurent Jalabert | France | ONCE | DNF-10 | |
| 12 | Íñigo Cuesta | Spain | ONCE | DNF-13 | |
| 13 | Herminio Díaz Zabala | Spain | ONCE | 53 | |
| 14 | Aitor Garmendia | Spain | ONCE | 35 | |
| 15 | Patrick Jonker | Australia | ONCE | 12 | |
| 16 | Melcior Mauri | Spain | ONCE | 38 | |
| 17 | Roberto Sierra | Spain | ONCE | 41 | |
| 18 | Neil Stephens | Australia | ONCE | 49 | |
| 19 | Alex Zülle | Switzerland | ONCE | 26 | |
| 21 | Bjarne Riis | Denmark | Team Telekom | 1 | |
| 22 | Rolf Aldag | Germany | Team Telekom | 83 | |
| 23 | Udo Bölts | Germany | Team Telekom | 14 | |
| 24 | Christian Henn | Germany | Team Telekom | 76 | |
| 25 | Jens Heppner | Germany | Team Telekom | 88 | |
| 26 | Brian Holm | Denmark | Team Telekom | 107 | |
| 27 | Mario Kummer | Germany | Team Telekom | DNS-2 | |
| 28 | Jan Ullrich | Germany | Team Telekom | 2 | |
| 29 | Erik Zabel | Germany | Team Telekom | 82 | |
| 31 | Tony Rominger | Switzerland | Mapei–GB | 10 | |
| 32 | Federico Echave | Spain | Mapei–GB | 40 | |
| 33 | Manuel Fernández Ginés | Spain | Mapei–GB | 16 | |
| 34 | Arsenio González | Spain | Mapei–GB | 24 | |
| 35 | Paolo Lanfranchi | Italy | Mapei–GB | 59 | |
| 36 | Johan Museeuw | Belgium | Mapei–GB | 95 | |
| 37 | Abraham Olano | Spain | Mapei–GB | 9 | |
| 38 | Wilfried Peeters | Belgium | Mapei–GB | 110 | |
| 39 | Andrea Tafi | Italy | Mapei–GB | 45 | |
| 41 | Fabio Baldato | Italy | MG Maglificio–Technogym | 63 | |
| 42 | Michele Bartoli | Italy | MG Maglificio–Technogym | 19 | |
| 43 | Alberto Elli | Italy | MG Maglificio–Technogym | 15 | |
| 44 | Carlo Finco | Italy | MG Maglificio–Technogym | DNF-4 | |
| 45 | Rolf Järmann | Switzerland | MG Maglificio–Technogym | 90 | |
| 46 | Marco Lietti | Italy | MG Maglificio–Technogym | DNF-17 | |
| 47 | Roberto Pistore | Italy | MG Maglificio–Technogym | DNS-8 | |
| 48 | Pascal Richard | Switzerland | MG Maglificio–Technogym | 47 | |
| 49 | Marco Saligari | Italy | MG Maglificio–Technogym | 72 | |
| 51 | Evgeni Berzin | Russia | Gewiss Playbus | 20 | |
| 52 | Dario Bottaro | Italy | Gewiss Playbus | 117 | |
| 53 | Bruno Cenghialta | Italy | Gewiss Playbus | 56 | |
| 54 | Ivan Cerioli | Italy | Gewiss Playbus | 121 | |
| 55 | Francesco Frattini | Italy | Gewiss Playbus | 100 | |
| 56 | Ivan Gotti | Italy | Gewiss Playbus | DNF-5 | |
| 57 | Nicola Minali | Italy | Gewiss Playbus | DNF-11 | |
| 58 | Davide Perona | Italy | Gewiss Playbus | 50 | |
| 59 | Stefano Zanini | Italy | Gewiss Playbus | DNF-4 | |
| 61 | Lance Armstrong | United States | Motorola | DNF-6 | |
| 62 | Frankie Andreu | United States | Motorola | 111 | |
| 63 | George Hincapie | United States | Motorola | DNS-15 | |
| 64 | Laurent Madouas | France | Motorola | 23 | |
| 65 | Jesús Montoya | Spain | Motorola | DNF-17 | |
| 66 | Kaspars Ozers | Latvia | Motorola | DNF-6 | |
| 67 | Maximilian Sciandri | Great Britain | Motorola | DNF-11 | |
| 68 | Bruno Thibout | France | Motorola | 55 | |
| 69 | Flavio Vanzella | Italy | Motorola | 60 | |
| 71 | Richard Virenque | France | Festina–Lotus | 3 | |
| 72 | Bruno Boscardin | Italy | Festina–Lotus | 80 | |
| 73 | Laurent Brochard | France | Festina–Lotus | 18 | |
| 74 | Laurent Dufaux | Switzerland | Festina–Lotus | 4 | |
| 75 | Félix García Casas | Spain | Festina–Lotus | 48 | |
| 76 | Pascal Hervé | France | Festina–Lotus | 42 | |
| 77 | Emmanuel Magnien | France | Festina–Lotus | DNF-12 | |
| 78 | Christophe Moreau | France | Festina–Lotus | 75 | |
| 79 | Jean-Cyril Robin | France | Festina–Lotus | DNF-6 | |
| 81 | Johan Bruyneel | Belgium | Rabobank | DNF-10 | |
| 82 | Michael Boogerd | Netherlands | Rabobank | 31 | |
| 83 | Erik Breukink | Netherlands | Rabobank | 34 | |
| 84 | Erik Dekker | Netherlands | Rabobank | 74 | |
| 85 | Viatcheslav Ekimov | Russia | Rabobank | 21 | |
| 86 | Danny Nelissen | Netherlands | Rabobank | 84 | |
| 87 | Arvis Piziks | Latvia | Rabobank | DNF-13 | |
| 88 | Rolf Sørensen | Denmark | Rabobank | 28 | |
| 89 | Léon van Bon | Netherlands | Rabobank | DNF-7 | |
| 91 | Chris Boardman | Great Britain | GAN | 39 | |
| 92 | Stéphane Heulot | France | GAN | DNF-7 | |
| 93 | François Lemarchand | France | GAN | 91 | |
| 94 | Frédéric Moncassin | France | GAN | 106 | |
| 95 | Francis Moreau | France | GAN | HD-6 | |
| 96 | Didier Rous | France | GAN | DNF-17 | |
| 97 | Eddy Seigneur | France | GAN | DNF-6 | |
| 98 | François Simon | France | GAN | 86 | |
| 99 | Cédric Vasseur | France | GAN | 69 | |
| 101 | Mario Cipollini | Italy | Saeco–AS Juvenes San Marino | DNS-5 | |
| 102 | Simone Biasci | Italy | Saeco–AS Juvenes San Marino | 126 | |
| 103 | Giuseppe Calcaterra | Italy | Saeco–AS Juvenes San Marino | DNF-6 | |
| 104 | Massimo Donati | Italy | Saeco–AS Juvenes San Marino | 70 | |
| 105 | Gian Matteo Fagnini | Italy | Saeco–AS Juvenes San Marino | DNF-6 | |
| 106 | Paolo Fornaciari | Italy | Saeco–AS Juvenes San Marino | 79 | |
| 107 | Massimiliano Lelli | Italy | Saeco–AS Juvenes San Marino | 25 | |
| 108 | Eros Poli | Italy | Saeco–AS Juvenes San Marino | 127 | |
| 109 | Mario Scirea | Italy | Saeco–AS Juvenes San Marino | DNF-6 | |
| 111 | Luc Leblanc | France | Team Polti | 6 | |
| 112 | Dirk Baldinger | Germany | Team Polti | DNF-11 | |
| 113 | Rossano Brasi | Italy | Team Polti | 97 | |
| 114 | Gerrit de Vries | Netherlands | Team Polti | 119 | |
| 115 | Mirco Gualdi | Italy | Team Polti | 43 | |
| 116 | Giuseppe Guerini | Italy | Team Polti | 27 | |
| 117 | Frédéric Guesdon | France | Team Polti | 108 | |
| 118 | Daisuke Imanaka | Japan | Team Polti | HD-14 | |
| 119 | Serguei Outschakov | Ukraine | Team Polti | HD-6 | |
| 121 | Wladimir Belli | Italy | Panaria–Vinavil | 68 | |
| 122 | Alessandro Baronti | Italy | Panaria–Vinavil | 112 | |
| 123 | Davide Bramati | Italy | Panaria–Vinavil | DNF-6 | |
| 124 | Oscar Camenzind | Switzerland | Panaria–Vinavil | 36 | |
| 125 | Roberto Conti | Italy | Panaria–Vinavil | DNS-P | |
| 126 | Valentino Fois | Italy | Panaria–Vinavil | 52 | |
| 127 | Sergio Previtali | Italy | Panaria–Vinavil | DSQ-1 | |
| 128 | Zbigniew Spruch | Poland | Panaria–Vinavil | DNF-11 | |
| 129 | Ján Svorada | Czech Republic | Panaria–Vinavil | DNF-5 | |
| 131 | Claudio Chiappucci | Italy | Carrera Jeans–Tassoni | 37 | |
| 132 | Mario Chiesa | Italy | Carrera Jeans–Tassoni | 125 | |
| 133 | Peter Luttenberger | Austria | Carrera Jeans–Tassoni | 5 | |
| 134 | Oscar Pelliccioli | Italy | Carrera Jeans–Tassoni | 85 | |
| 135 | Massimo Podenzana | Italy | Carrera Jeans–Tassoni | 61 | |
| 136 | Marcello Siboni | Italy | Carrera Jeans–Tassoni | 65 | |
| 137 | Mario Traversoni | Italy | Carrera Jeans–Tassoni | DNF-10 | |
| 138 | Enrico Zaina | Italy | Carrera Jeans–Tassoni | DNF-3 | |
| 139 | Beat Zberg | Switzerland | Carrera Jeans–Tassoni | DNF-6 | |
| 141 | Piotr Ugrumov | Latvia | Roslotto–ZG Mobili | 7 | |
| 142 | Stefano Cattai | Italy | Roslotto–ZG Mobili | 22 | |
| 143 | Andrea Ferrigato | Italy | Roslotto–ZG Mobili | 46 | |
| 144 | Marco Fincato | Italy | Roslotto–ZG Mobili | 30 | |
| 145 | Maurizio Fondriest | Italy | Roslotto–ZG Mobili | 51 | |
| 146 | Alexander Gontchenkov | Russia | Roslotto–ZG Mobili | DNF-6 | |
| 147 | Pascal Lino | France | Roslotto–ZG Mobili | DNF-10 | |
| 148 | Paolo Savoldelli | Italy | Roslotto–ZG Mobili | 33 | |
| 149 | Marco Zen | Italy | Roslotto–ZG Mobili | 73 | |
| 151 | Maarten den Bakker | Netherlands | TVM–Farm Frites | 64 | |
| 152 | Jeroen Blijlevens | Netherlands | TVM–Farm Frites | 128 | |
| 153 | Bo Hamburger | Denmark | TVM–Farm Frites | 13 | |
| 154 | Servais Knaven | Netherlands | TVM–Farm Frites | DNS-5 | |
| 155 | Vladimir Poulnikov | Ukraine | TVM–Farm Frites | HD-14 | |
| 156 | Laurent Roux | France | TVM–Farm Frites | 44 | |
| 157 | Jesper Skibby | Denmark | TVM–Farm Frites | 29 | |
| 158 | Peter Van Petegem | Belgium | TVM–Farm Frites | 116 | |
| 159 | Bart Voskamp | Netherlands | TVM–Farm Frites | 99 | |
| 161 | Djamolidine Abdoujaparov | Uzbekistan | Refin–Mobilvetta | 78 | |
| 162 | Mauro Bettin | Italy | Refin–Mobilvetta | HD-6 | |
| 163 | Stefano Colagè | Italy | Refin–Mobilvetta | DNF-7 | |
| 164 | Heinz Imboden | Switzerland | Refin–Mobilvetta | DNF-6 | |
| 165 | Sergei Uslamin | Russia | Refin–Mobilvetta | 87 | |
| 166 | Leonardo Piepoli | Italy | Refin–Mobilvetta | 17 | |
| 167 | Fabio Roscioli | Italy | Refin–Mobilvetta | 98 | |
| 168 | Cristian Salvato | Italy | Refin–Mobilvetta | 94 | |
| 169 | Tobias Steinhauser | Germany | Refin–Mobilvetta | 113 | |
| 171 | Andrei Tchmil | Russia | Lotto | 77 | |
| 172 | Gilles Bouvard | France | Lotto | DNF-8 | |
| 173 | Peter Farazijn | Belgium | Lotto | 122 | |
| 174 | Thomas Fleischer | Germany | Lotto | DNF-14 | |
| 175 | Oleg Kozlitine | Kazakhstan | Lotto | DNF-11 | |
| 176 | Nico Mattan | Belgium | Lotto | 123 | |
| 177 | Scott Sunderland | Australia | Lotto | 101 | |
| 178 | Paul Van Hyfte | Belgium | Lotto | 120 | |
| 179 | Marc Wauters | Belgium | Lotto | 124 | |
| 181 | Fernando Escartín | Spain | Kelme–Artiach | 8 | |
| 182 | Julio-Cesar Aguirre | Colombia | Kelme–Artiach | 81 | |
| 183 | Hernán Buenahora | Colombia | Kelme–Artiach | DNF-1 | |
| 184 | Francisco Cabello | Spain | Kelme–Artiach | 102 | |
| 185 | José Castelblanco | Colombia | Kelme–Artiach | 71 | |
| 186 | Laudelino Cubino | Spain | Kelme–Artiach | DNF-2 | |
| 187 | José Jaime González | Colombia | Kelme–Artiach | 96 | |
| 188 | Federico Muñoz | Colombia | Kelme–Artiach | 89 | |
| 189 | José Ángel Vidal | Spain | Kelme–Artiach | 109 | |
| 191 | Mariano Piccoli | Italy | Brescialat | 93 | |
| 192 | Alessandro Bertolini | Italy | Brescialat | DNF-16 | |
| 193 | Claudio Camin | Italy | Brescialat | DNF-7 | |
| 194 | Marco Della Vedova | Italy | Brescialat | DNF-14 | |
| 195 | Cristiano Frattini | Italy | Brescialat | 103 | |
| 196 | Luca Gelfi | Italy | Brescialat | DNF-2 | |
| 197 | Zenon Jaskuła | Poland | Brescialat | DNF-7 | |
| 198 | Omar Pumar | Venezuela | Brescialat | 105 | |
| 199 | Mauro Radaelli | Italy | Brescialat | DNF-7 | |
| 201 | Jacky Durand | France | Agrigel–La Creuse–Fenioux | 115 | |
| 202 | Dominique Arnould | France | Agrigel–La Creuse–Fenioux | DNF-10 | |
| 203 | Jean-Pierre Bourgeot | France | Agrigel–La Creuse–Fenioux | 67 | |
| 204 | Franck Bouyer | France | Agrigel–La Creuse–Fenioux | DNF-14 | |
| 205 | Jean-Claude Colotti | France | Agrigel–La Creuse–Fenioux | DNF-17 | |
| 206 | Thierry Laurent | France | Agrigel–La Creuse–Fenioux | 104 | |
| 207 | Thierry Marie | France | Agrigel–La Creuse–Fenioux | DNF-10 | |
| 208 | Jean-Luc Masdupuy | France | Agrigel–La Creuse–Fenioux | 129 | |
| 209 | Michel Vermote | Belgium | Agrigel–La Creuse–Fenioux | DNF-5 | |
| 211 | Christophe Capelle | France | Aubervilliers 93 | DNF-7 | |
| 212 | Thierry Bourguignon | France | Aubervilliers 93 | 62 | |
| 213 | Laurent Genty | France | Aubervilliers 93 | DNF-15 | |
| 214 | Thierry Gouvenou | France | Aubervilliers 93 | 114 | |
| 215 | Marek Leśniewski | Poland | Aubervilliers 93 | HD-14 | |
| 216 | Frédéric Pontier | France | Aubervilliers 93 | DNF-6 | |
| 217 | Cyril Saugrain | France | Aubervilliers 93 | DNF-6 | |
| 218 | Gilles Talmant | France | Aubervilliers 93 | 118 | |
| 219 | Francisque Teyssier | France | Aubervilliers 93 | DNF-6 | |

=== By team ===
Banesto
| No. | Rider | Pos. |
|---|---|---|
| 1 | Miguel Induráin (ESP) | 11 |
| 2 | Marino Alonso (ESP) | 66 |
| 3 | Vicente Aparicio (ESP) | DNF-17 |
| 4 | José Luis Arrieta (ESP) | 32 |
| 5 | Prudencio Induráin (ESP) | 58 |
| 6 | José María Jiménez (ESP) | 57 |
| 7 | Carmelo Miranda (ESP) | DNF-4 |
| 8 | Orlando Rodrigues (POR) | 54 |
| 9 | José Ramón Uriarte (ESP) | 92 |

ONCE
| No. | Rider | Pos. |
|---|---|---|
| 11 | Laurent Jalabert (FRA) | DNF-10 |
| 12 | Íñigo Cuesta (ESP) | DNF-13 |
| 13 | Herminio Díaz Zabala (ESP) | 53 |
| 14 | Aitor Garmendia (ESP) | 35 |
| 15 | Patrick Jonker (AUS) | 12 |
| 16 | Melcior Mauri (ESP) | 38 |
| 17 | Roberto Sierra (ESP) | 41 |
| 18 | Neil Stephens (AUS) | 49 |
| 19 | Alex Zülle (SUI) | 26 |

Team Telekom
| No. | Rider | Pos. |
|---|---|---|
| 21 | Bjarne Riis (DEN) | 1 |
| 22 | Rolf Aldag (GER) | 83 |
| 23 | Udo Bölts (GER) | 14 |
| 24 | Christian Henn (GER) | 76 |
| 25 | Jens Heppner (GER) | 88 |
| 26 | Brian Holm (DEN) | 107 |
| 27 | Mario Kummer (GER) | DNS-2 |
| 28 | Jan Ullrich (GER) | 2 |
| 29 | Erik Zabel (GER) | 82 |

Mapei–GB
| No. | Rider | Pos. |
|---|---|---|
| 31 | Tony Rominger (SUI) | 10 |
| 32 | Federico Echave (ESP) | 40 |
| 33 | Manuel Fernández Ginés (ESP) | 16 |
| 34 | Arsenio González (ESP) | 24 |
| 35 | Paolo Lanfranchi (ITA) | 59 |
| 36 | Johan Museeuw (BEL) | 95 |
| 37 | Abraham Olano (ESP) | 9 |
| 38 | Wilfried Peeters (BEL) | 110 |
| 39 | Andrea Tafi (ITA) | 45 |

MG Maglificio–Technogym
| No. | Rider | Pos. |
|---|---|---|
| 41 | Fabio Baldato (ITA) | 63 |
| 42 | Michele Bartoli (ITA) | 19 |
| 43 | Alberto Elli (ITA) | 15 |
| 44 | Carlo Finco (ITA) | DNF-4 |
| 45 | Rolf Järmann (SUI) | 90 |
| 46 | Marco Lietti (ITA) | DNF-17 |
| 47 | Roberto Pistore (ITA) | DNS-8 |
| 48 | Pascal Richard (SUI) | 47 |
| 49 | Marco Saligari (ITA) | 72 |

Gewiss Playbus
| No. | Rider | Pos. |
|---|---|---|
| 51 | Evgeni Berzin (RUS) | 20 |
| 52 | Dario Bottaro (ITA) | 117 |
| 53 | Bruno Cenghialta (ITA) | 56 |
| 54 | Ivan Cerioli (ITA) | 121 |
| 55 | Francesco Frattini (ITA) | 100 |
| 56 | Ivan Gotti (ITA) | DNF-5 |
| 57 | Nicola Minali (ITA) | DNF-11 |
| 58 | Davide Perona (ITA) | 50 |
| 59 | Stefano Zanini (ITA) | DNF-4 |

Motorola
| No. | Rider | Pos. |
|---|---|---|
| 61 | Lance Armstrong (USA) | DNF-6 |
| 62 | Frankie Andreu (USA) | 111 |
| 63 | George Hincapie (USA) | DNS-15 |
| 64 | Laurent Madouas (FRA) | 23 |
| 65 | Jesús Montoya (ESP) | DNF-17 |
| 66 | Kaspars Ozers (LAT) | DNF-6 |
| 67 | Maximilian Sciandri (GBR) | DNF-11 |
| 68 | Bruno Thibout (FRA) | 55 |
| 69 | Flavio Vanzella (ITA) | 60 |

Festina–Lotus
| No. | Rider | Pos. |
|---|---|---|
| 71 | Richard Virenque (FRA) | 3 |
| 72 | Bruno Boscardin (ITA) | 80 |
| 73 | Laurent Brochard (FRA) | 18 |
| 74 | Laurent Dufaux (SUI) | 4 |
| 75 | Félix García Casas (ESP) | 48 |
| 76 | Pascal Hervé (FRA) | 42 |
| 77 | Emmanuel Magnien (FRA) | DNF-12 |
| 78 | Christophe Moreau (FRA) | 75 |
| 79 | Jean-Cyril Robin (FRA) | DNF-6 |

Rabobank
| No. | Rider | Pos. |
|---|---|---|
| 81 | Johan Bruyneel (BEL) | DNF-10 |
| 82 | Michael Boogerd (NED) | 31 |
| 83 | Erik Breukink (NED) | 34 |
| 84 | Erik Dekker (NED) | 74 |
| 85 | Viatcheslav Ekimov (RUS) | 21 |
| 86 | Danny Nelissen (NED) | 84 |
| 87 | Arvis Piziks (LAT) | DNF-13 |
| 88 | Rolf Sørensen (DEN) | 28 |
| 89 | Léon van Bon (NED) | DNF-7 |

GAN
| No. | Rider | Pos. |
|---|---|---|
| 91 | Chris Boardman (GBR) | 39 |
| 92 | Stéphane Heulot (FRA) | DNF-7 |
| 93 | François Lemarchand (FRA) | 91 |
| 94 | Frédéric Moncassin (FRA) | 106 |
| 95 | Francis Moreau (FRA) | HD-6 |
| 96 | Didier Rous (FRA) | DNF-17 |
| 97 | Eddy Seigneur (FRA) | DNF-6 |
| 98 | François Simon (FRA) | 86 |
| 99 | Cédric Vasseur (FRA) | 69 |

Saeco–AS Juvenes San Marino
| No. | Rider | Pos. |
|---|---|---|
| 101 | Mario Cipollini (ITA) | DNS-5 |
| 102 | Simone Biasci (ITA) | 126 |
| 103 | Giuseppe Calcaterra (ITA) | DNF-6 |
| 104 | Massimo Donati (ITA) | 70 |
| 105 | Gian Matteo Fagnini (ITA) | DNF-6 |
| 106 | Paolo Fornaciari (ITA) | 79 |
| 107 | Massimiliano Lelli (ITA) | 25 |
| 108 | Eros Poli (ITA) | 127 |
| 109 | Mario Scirea (ITA) | DNF-6 |

Team Polti
| No. | Rider | Pos. |
|---|---|---|
| 111 | Luc Leblanc (FRA) | 6 |
| 112 | Dirk Baldinger (GER) | DNF-11 |
| 113 | Rossano Brasi (ITA) | 97 |
| 114 | Gerrit de Vries (NED) | 119 |
| 115 | Mirco Gualdi (ITA) | 43 |
| 116 | Giuseppe Guerini (ITA) | 27 |
| 117 | Frédéric Guesdon (FRA) | 108 |
| 118 | Daisuke Imanaka (JPN) | HD-14 |
| 119 | Serguei Outschakov (UKR) | HD-6 |

Panaria–Vinavil
| No. | Rider | Pos. |
|---|---|---|
| 121 | Wladimir Belli (ITA) | 68 |
| 122 | Alessandro Baronti (ITA) | 112 |
| 123 | Davide Bramati (ITA) | DNF-6 |
| 124 | Oscar Camenzind (SUI) | 36 |
| 125 | Roberto Conti (ITA) | DNS-P |
| 126 | Valentino Fois (ITA) | 52 |
| 127 | Sergio Previtali (ITA) | DSQ-1 |
| 128 | Zbigniew Spruch (POL) | DNF-11 |
| 129 | Ján Svorada (CZE) | DNF-5 |

Carrera Jeans–Tassoni
| No. | Rider | Pos. |
|---|---|---|
| 131 | Claudio Chiappucci (ITA) | 37 |
| 132 | Mario Chiesa (ITA) | 125 |
| 133 | Peter Luttenberger (AUT) | 5 |
| 134 | Oscar Pelliccioli (ITA) | 85 |
| 135 | Massimo Podenzana (ITA) | 61 |
| 136 | Marcello Siboni (ITA) | 65 |
| 137 | Mario Traversoni (ITA) | DNF-10 |
| 138 | Enrico Zaina (ITA) | DNF-3 |
| 139 | Beat Zberg (SUI) | DNF-6 |

Roslotto–ZG Mobili
| No. | Rider | Pos. |
|---|---|---|
| 141 | Piotr Ugrumov (LAT) | 7 |
| 142 | Stefano Cattai (ITA) | 22 |
| 143 | Andrea Ferrigato (ITA) | 46 |
| 144 | Marco Fincato (ITA) | 30 |
| 145 | Maurizio Fondriest (ITA) | 51 |
| 146 | Alexander Gontchenkov (RUS) | DNF-6 |
| 147 | Pascal Lino (FRA) | DNF-10 |
| 148 | Paolo Savoldelli (ITA) | 33 |
| 149 | Marco Zen (ITA) | 73 |

TVM–Farm Frites
| No. | Rider | Pos. |
|---|---|---|
| 151 | Maarten den Bakker (NED) | 64 |
| 152 | Jeroen Blijlevens (NED) | 128 |
| 153 | Bo Hamburger (DEN) | 13 |
| 154 | Servais Knaven (NED) | DNS-5 |
| 155 | Vladimir Poulnikov (UKR) | HD-14 |
| 156 | Laurent Roux (FRA) | 44 |
| 157 | Jesper Skibby (DEN) | 29 |
| 158 | Peter Van Petegem (BEL) | 116 |
| 159 | Bart Voskamp (NED) | 99 |

Refin–Mobilvetta
| No. | Rider | Pos. |
|---|---|---|
| 161 | Djamolidine Abdoujaparov (UZB) | 78 |
| 162 | Mauro Bettin (ITA) | HD-6 |
| 163 | Stefano Colagè (ITA) | DNF-7 |
| 164 | Heinz Imboden (SUI) | DNF-6 |
| 165 | Sergei Uslamin (RUS) | 87 |
| 166 | Leonardo Piepoli (ITA) | 17 |
| 167 | Fabio Roscioli (ITA) | 98 |
| 168 | Cristian Salvato (ITA) | 94 |
| 169 | Tobias Steinhauser (GER) | 113 |

Lotto
| No. | Rider | Pos. |
|---|---|---|
| 171 | Andrei Tchmil (RUS) | 77 |
| 172 | Gilles Bouvard (FRA) | DNF-8 |
| 173 | Peter Farazijn (BEL) | 122 |
| 174 | Thomas Fleischer (GER) | DNF-14 |
| 175 | Oleg Kozlitine (KAZ) | DNF-11 |
| 176 | Nico Mattan (BEL) | 123 |
| 177 | Scott Sunderland (AUS) | 101 |
| 178 | Paul Van Hyfte (BEL) | 120 |
| 179 | Marc Wauters (BEL) | 124 |

Kelme–Artiach
| No. | Rider | Pos. |
|---|---|---|
| 181 | Fernando Escartín (ESP) | 8 |
| 182 | Julio-Cesar Aguirre (COL) | 81 |
| 183 | Hernán Buenahora (COL) | DNF-1 |
| 184 | Francisco Cabello (ESP) | 102 |
| 185 | José Castelblanco (COL) | 71 |
| 186 | Laudelino Cubino (ESP) | DNF-2 |
| 187 | José Jaime González (COL) | 96 |
| 188 | Federico Muñoz (COL) | 89 |
| 189 | José Ángel Vidal (ESP) | 109 |

Brescialat
| No. | Rider | Pos. |
|---|---|---|
| 191 | Mariano Piccoli (ITA) | 93 |
| 192 | Alessandro Bertolini (ITA) | DNF-16 |
| 193 | Claudio Camin (ITA) | DNF-7 |
| 194 | Marco Della Vedova (ITA) | DNF-14 |
| 195 | Cristiano Frattini (ITA) | 103 |
| 196 | Luca Gelfi (ITA) | DNF-2 |
| 197 | Zenon Jaskuła (POL) | DNF-7 |
| 198 | Omar Pumar (VEN) | 105 |
| 199 | Mauro Radaelli (ITA) | DNF-7 |

Agrigel–La Creuse–Fenioux
| No. | Rider | Pos. |
|---|---|---|
| 201 | Jacky Durand (FRA) | 115 |
| 202 | Dominique Arnould (FRA) | DNF-10 |
| 203 | Jean-Pierre Bourgeot (FRA) | 67 |
| 204 | Franck Bouyer (FRA) | DNF-14 |
| 205 | Jean-Claude Colotti (FRA) | DNF-17 |
| 206 | Thierry Laurent (FRA) | 104 |
| 207 | Thierry Marie (FRA) | DNF-10 |
| 208 | Jean-Luc Masdupuy (FRA) | 129 |
| 209 | Michel Vermote (BEL) | DNF-5 |

Aubervilliers 93
| No. | Rider | Pos. |
|---|---|---|
| 211 | Christophe Capelle (FRA) | DNF-7 |
| 212 | Thierry Bourguignon (FRA) | 62 |
| 213 | Laurent Genty (FRA) | DNF-15 |
| 214 | Thierry Gouvenou (FRA) | 114 |
| 215 | Marek Leśniewski (POL) | HD-14 |
| 216 | Frédéric Pontier (FRA) | DNF-6 |
| 217 | Cyril Saugrain (FRA) | DNF-6 |
| 218 | Gilles Talmant (FRA) | 118 |
| 219 | Francisque Teyssier (FRA) | DNF-6 |

=== By nationality ===
| Country | No. of riders | In competition | Stage wins |
|---|---|---|---|
| Australia | 3 | 3 | |
| Austria | 1 | 1 | |
| Belgium | 9 | 7 | |
| Colombia | 6 | 5 | 1 (José Jaime González) |
| Czech Republic | 1 | 0 | |
| Denmark | 5 | 5 | 3 (Bjarne Riis x2, Rolf Sørensen) |
| Estonia | 1 | 0 | |
| France | 38 | 20 | 4 (Frédéric Moncassin x2, Cyril Saugrain, Luc Leblanc) |
| Germany | 10 | 7 | 3 (Erik Zabel x2, Jan Ullrich) |
| Great Britain | 2 | 1 | |
| Italy | 62 | 40 | 3 (Mario Cipollini, Massimo Podenzana, Fabio Baldato) |
| Japan | 1 | 0 | |
| Kazakhstan | 1 | 0 | |
| Latvia | 3 | 1 | |
| Netherlands | 10 | 8 | 3 (Jeroen Blijlevens, Michael Boogerd, Bart Voskamp) |
| Poland | 3 | 0 | |
| Portugal | 1 | 1 | |
| Russia | 5 | 4 | 1 (Evgueni Berzin |
| Spain | 23 | 18 | |
| Switzerland | 8 | 6 | 3 (Alex Zülle, Pascal Richard, Laurent Dufaux) |
| Ukraine | 2 | 0 | |
| United States | 3 | 1 | |
| Uzbekistan | 1 | 1 | 1 (Djamolidine Abdoujaparov) |
| Venezuela | 1 | 1 | |
| Total | 198 | 115 | 22 |
