= List of teams and cyclists in the 1995 Tour de France =

List of cyclists

There were 21 teams in the 1995 Tour de France, each composed of 9 cyclists. The teams were selected in two rounds: in May 1995, the first fifteen teams were announced:

In June, five wildcards were announced:

Shortly before the start, Le Groupement folded because their team leader Luc Leblanc was injured, and because of financial problems. Their spot went to Aki–Gipiemme, the first team in the reserve list. Additionally, the organisation decided to invite one extra team: a combined team of Team Telekom and ZG Mobili, with six riders from Telekom and three from ZG Mobili.

== Teams ==
Qualified teams

- Castorama
- Aki–Gipiemme
- GAN
- Chazal–König
- Carrera Jeans–Tassoni
- Gewiss–Ballan
- Mapei–GB–Latexco
- MG Maglificio–Technogym
- Mercatone Uno–Saeco
- Banesto
- ONCE
- Motorola
- Lotto–Isoglass
- Novell–Decca–Colnago
- Festina–Lotus

Invited teams

- TVM–Polis Direct
- Brescialat–Fago
- Kelme–Sureña
- Lampre–Panaria
- Polti–Granarolo–Santini
- Team Telekom/ZG Mobili–Selle Italia

== Cyclists ==
=== By starting number ===
Legend
No.	Starting number worn by the rider during the Tour
Pos.	Position in the general classification
DNF	Denotes a rider who did not finish

No.	Name	Nationality	Team	Pos.	Ref
1	Miguel Induráin	Spain	Banesto	1	
2	Marino Alonso	Spain	Banesto	78	
3	Vicente Aparicio	Spain	Banesto	21	
4	Thomas Davy	France	Banesto	80	
5	Aitor Garmendia	Spain	Banesto	95	
6	Ramón González Arrieta	Spain	Banesto	40	
7	Carmelo Miranda	Spain	Banesto	57	
8	Gérard Rué	France	Banesto	41	
9	José Ramón Uriarte	Spain	Banesto	69	
11	Evgeni Berzin	Russia	Gewiss–Ballan	DNF	
12	Guido Bontempi	Italy	Gewiss–Ballan	89	
13	Dario Bottaro	Italy	Gewiss–Ballan	79	
14	Bruno Cenghialta	Italy	Gewiss–Ballan	15	
15	Gabriele Colombo	Italy	Gewiss–Ballan	51	
16	Francesco Frattini	Italy	Gewiss–Ballan	77	
17	Ivan Gotti	Italy	Gewiss–Ballan	5	
18	Bjarne Riis	Denmark	Gewiss–Ballan	3	
19	Alberto Volpi	Italy	Gewiss–Ballan	65	
21	Marco Pantani	Italy	Carrera Jeans–Tassoni	13	
22	Sergio Barbero	Italy	Carrera Jeans–Tassoni	DNF	
23	Alessandro Bertolini	Italy	Carrera Jeans–Tassoni	DNF	
24	Claudio Chiappucci	Italy	Carrera Jeans–Tassoni	11	
25	Mario Chiesa	Italy	Carrera Jeans–Tassoni	DNF	
26	Marcello Siboni	Italy	Carrera Jeans–Tassoni	84	
27	Leonardo Sierra	Venezuela	Carrera Jeans–Tassoni	50	
28	Enrico Zaina	Italy	Carrera Jeans–Tassoni	42	
29	Beat Zberg	Switzerland	Carrera Jeans–Tassoni	29	
31	Zenon Jaskuła	Poland	Aki–Gipiemme	46	
32	Mauro Bettin	Italy	Aki–Gipiemme	99	
33	Giuseppe Citterio	Italy	Aki–Gipiemme	DNF	
34	René Foucachon	France	Aki–Gipiemme	DNF	
35	Gianluca Gorini	Italy	Aki–Gipiemme	110	
36	Dimitri Konyshev	Russia	Aki–Gipiemme	DNF	
37	Dante Rezze	France	Aki–Gipiemme	DNF	
38	Gilberto Simoni	Italy	Aki–Gipiemme	DNF	
39	Denis Zanette	Italy	Aki–Gipiemme	DNF	
41	Tony Rominger	Switzerland	Mapei–GB–Latexco	8	
42	Carlo Bomans	Belgium	Mapei–GB–Latexco	DNF	
43	Gianluca Bortolami	Italy	Mapei–GB–Latexco	DNF	
44	Fernando Escartín	Spain	Mapei–GB–Latexco	7	
45	Arsenio González	Spain	Mapei–GB–Latexco	23	
46	Francisco Javier Mauleón	Spain	Mapei–GB–Latexco	DNF	
47	Johan Museeuw	Belgium	Mapei–GB–Latexco	73	
48	Wilfried Peeters	Belgium	Mapei–GB–Latexco	88	
49	Andrea Tafi	Italy	Mapei–GB–Latexco	39	
51	Richard Virenque	France	Festina–Lotus	9	
52	Bruno Boscardin	Switzerland	Festina–Lotus	DNF	
53	Laurent Brochard	France	Festina–Lotus	28	
54	Laurent Dufaux	Switzerland	Festina–Lotus	19	
55	Pascal Hervé	France	Festina–Lotus	DNF	
56	Stephen Hodge	Australia	Festina–Lotus	64	
57	Fabian Jeker	Switzerland	Festina–Lotus	68	
58	Lars Michaelsen	Denmark	Festina–Lotus	DNF	
59	Jean-Cyril Robin	France	Festina–Lotus	22	
61	Laurent Jalabert	France	ONCE	4	
62	Erik Breukink	Netherlands	ONCE	20	
63	Johan Bruyneel	Belgium	ONCE	31	
64	Herminio Díaz Zabala	Spain	ONCE	35	
65	Melcior Mauri	Spain	ONCE	6	
66	Luis María Díaz De Otazu	Spain	ONCE	DNF	
67	Mariano Rojas	Spain	ONCE	DNF	
68	Neil Stephens	Australia	ONCE	60	
69	Alex Zülle	Switzerland	ONCE	2	
71	Maurizio Fondriest	Italy	Lampre–Panaria	DNF	
72	Wladimir Belli	Italy	Lampre–Panaria	DNF	
73	Roberto Conti	Italy	Lampre–Panaria	DNF	
74	Alessio Galletti	Italy	Lampre–Panaria	83	
75	Alexander Gontchenkov	Ukraine	Lampre–Panaria	96	
76	Davide Perona	Italy	Lampre–Panaria	81	
77	Marco Serpellini	Italy	Lampre–Panaria	111	
78	Ján Svorada	Slovakia	Lampre–Panaria	DNF	
79	Pavel Tonkov	Russia	Lampre–Panaria	DNF	
81	Chris Boardman	Great Britain	GAN	DNF	
82	Christophe Capelle	France	GAN	DNF	
83	Thierry Gouvenou	France	GAN	DNF	
84	Pascal Lance	France	GAN	DNF	
85	Yvon Ledanois	France	GAN	30	
86	François Lemarchand	France	GAN	92	
87	Francis Moreau	France	GAN	DNF	
88	Didier Rous	France	GAN	55	
89	Eddy Seigneur	France	GAN	DNF	
91	Georg Totschnig	Austria	Polti–Granarolo–Santini	37	
92	Dirk Baldinger	Germany	Polti–Granarolo–Santini	DNF	
93	Éric Boyer	France	Polti–Granarolo–Santini	DNF	
94	Rossano Brasi	Italy	Polti–Granarolo–Santini	102	
95	Giovanni Fidanza	Italy	Polti–Granarolo–Santini	108	
96	Giovanni Lombardi	Italy	Polti–Granarolo–Santini	103	
97	Serguei Outschakov	Ukraine	Polti–Granarolo–Santini	74	
98	Oscar Pelliccioli	Italy	Polti–Granarolo–Santini	32	
99	Mario Scirea	Italy	Polti–Granarolo–Santini	98	
101	Laudelino Cubino	Spain	Kelme–Avianca	27	
102	Julio César Aguirre	Colombia	Kelme–Avianca	DNF	
103	Hernán Buenahora	Colombia	Kelme–Avianca	10	
104	Francisco Cabello	Spain	Kelme–Avianca	DNF	
105	Ángel Camargo	Colombia	Kelme–Avianca	DNF	
106	Héctor Castaño	Colombia	Kelme–Avianca	DNF	
107	Ángel Edo	Spain	Kelme–Avianca	DNF	
108	Federico Muñoz	Colombia	Kelme–Avianca	24	
109	José Ángel Vidal	Spain	Kelme–Avianca	93	
111	Lance Armstrong	United States	Motorola	36	
112	Frankie Andreu	United States	Motorola	82	
113	Steve Bauer	Canada	Motorola	101	
114	Fabio Casartelli	Italy	Motorola	DNF	
115	Álvaro Mejía	Colombia	Motorola	16	
116	Kaspars Ozers	Latvia	Motorola	DNF	
117	Andrea Peron	Italy	Motorola	44	
118	Stephen Swart	New Zealand	Motorola	109	
119	Sean Yates	Great Britain	Motorola	DNF	
121	Bo Hamburger	Denmark	TVM–Polis Direct	17	
122	Jeroen Blijlevens	Netherlands	TVM–Polis Direct	DNF	
123	Maarten den Bakker	Netherlands	TVM–Polis Direct	52	
124	Tristan Hoffman	Netherlands	TVM–Polis Direct	DNF	
125	Jelle Nijdam	Netherlands	TVM–Polis Direct	DNF	
126	Hendrik Redant	Belgium	TVM–Polis Direct	DNF	
127	Jesper Skibby	Denmark	TVM–Polis Direct	49	
128	Jim Van De Laer	Belgium	TVM–Polis Direct	76	
129	Bart Voskamp	Netherlands	TVM–Polis Direct	113	
131	Andrei Tchmil	Russia	Lotto–Isoglass	71	
132	Mario De Clercq	Belgium	Lotto–Isoglass	DNF	
133	Peter De Clercq	Belgium	Lotto–Isoglass	DNF	
134	Peter Farazijn	Belgium	Lotto–Isoglass	105	
135	Herman Frison	Belgium	Lotto–Isoglass	DNF	
136	Sammie Moreels	Belgium	Lotto–Isoglass	DNF	
137	Wilfried Nelissen	Belgium	Lotto–Isoglass	DNF	
138	Marc Sergeant	Belgium	Lotto–Isoglass	DNF	
139	Rudy Verdonck	Belgium	Lotto–Isoglass	DNF	
141	Armand de Las Cuevas	France	Castorama	62	
142	Jacky Durand	France	Castorama	DNF	
143	Thierry Laurent	France	Castorama	DNF	
144	Laurent Madouas	France	Castorama	12	
145	Emmanuel Magnien	France	Castorama	DNF	
146	Thierry Marie	France	Castorama	94	
147	François Simon	France	Castorama	59	
148	Gilles Talmant	France	Castorama	104	
149	Bruno Thibout	France	Castorama	DNF	
151	Gianni Bugno	Italy	MG Maglificio–Technogym	53	
152	Fabio Baldato	Italy	MG Maglificio–Technogym	DNF	
153	Davide Cassani	Italy	MG Maglificio–Technogym	112	
154	Alberto Elli	Italy	MG Maglificio–Technogym	33	
155	Rolf Järmann	Switzerland	MG Maglificio–Technogym	67	
156	Nicola Loda	Italy	MG Maglificio–Technogym	100	
157	Max Sciandri	Great Britain	MG Maglificio–Technogym	47	
158	Flavio Vanzella	Italy	MG Maglificio–Technogym	86	
159	Franco Vona	Italy	MG Maglificio–Technogym	48	
161	Djamolidine Abdoujaparov	Uzbekistan	Novell–Decca–Colnago	56	
162	Eddy Bouwmans	Netherlands	Novell–Decca–Colnago	45	
163	Erik Dekker	Netherlands	Novell–Decca–Colnago	70	
164	Viatcheslav Ekimov	Russia	Novell–Decca–Colnago	18	
165	Frans Maassen	Netherlands	Novell–Decca–Colnago	97	
166	Frédéric Moncassin	France	Novell–Decca–Colnago	DNF	
167	Arvis Piziks	Lithuania	Novell–Decca–Colnago	91	
168	Léon van Bon	Netherlands	Novell–Decca–Colnago	DNF	
169	Marc Wauters	Belgium	Novell–Decca–Colnago	DNF	
171	Mario Cipollini	Italy	Mercatone Uno–Saeco	DNF	
172	Massimo Donati	Italy	Mercatone Uno–Saeco	72	
173	Gian Matteo Fagnini	Italy	Mercatone Uno–Saeco	107	
174	Rosario Fina	Italy	Mercatone Uno–Saeco	DNF	
175	Massimiliano Lelli	Italy	Mercatone Uno–Saeco	43	
176	Silvio Martinello	Italy	Mercatone Uno–Saeco	DNF	
177	Roberto Petito	Italy	Mercatone Uno–Saeco	DNF	
178	Eros Poli	Italy	Mercatone Uno–Saeco	114	
179	Antonio Politano	Italy	Mercatone Uno–Saeco	DNF	
181	Miguel Arroyo	Mexico	Chazal–MBK–König	61	
182	Jean-François Bernard	France	Chazal–MBK–König	34	
183	Jean-Pierre Bourgeot	France	Chazal–MBK–König	DNF	
184	Gilles Bouvard	France	Chazal–MBK–König	63	
185	Bruno Cornillet	France	Chazal–MBK–König	115	
186	Gilles Delion	France	Chazal–MBK–König	DNF	
187	Artūras Kasputis	Lithuania	Chazal–MBK–König	75	
188	Jaan Kirsipuu	Estonia	Chazal–MBK–König	DNF	
189	Christophe Mengin	France	Chazal–MBK–König	DNF	
191	Massimo Podenzana	Italy	Brescialat–Fago	26	
192	Fausto Dotti	Italy	Brescialat–Fago	DNF	
193	Paolo Lanfranchi	Italy	Brescialat–Fago	14	
194	Angelo Lecchi	Italy	Brescialat–Fago	DNF	
195	Mario Manzoni	Italy	Brescialat–Fago	DNF	
196	Marco Milesi	Italy	Brescialat–Fago	85	
197	Giancarlo Perini	Italy	Brescialat–Fago	87	
198	Mauro Radaelli	Italy	Brescialat–Fago	DNF	
199	Eric Vanderaerden	Belgium	Brescialat–Fago	DNF	
201	Rolf Aldag	Germany	Team Telekom/ZG Mobili–Selle Italia	58	
202	Udo Bölts	Germany	Team Telekom/ZG Mobili–Selle Italia	38	
203	Jens Heppner	Germany	Team Telekom/ZG Mobili–Selle Italia	66	
204	Olaf Ludwig	Germany	Team Telekom/ZG Mobili–Selle Italia	DNF	
205	Vladimir Poulnikov	Ukraine	Team Telekom/ZG Mobili–Selle Italia	25	
206	Erik Zabel	Germany	Team Telekom/ZG Mobili–Selle Italia	90	
207	Stefano Colagè	Italy	Team Telekom/ZG Mobili–Selle Italia	106	
208	Andrea Ferrigato	Italy	Team Telekom/ZG Mobili–Selle Italia	54	
209	Nelson Rodríguez Serna	Colombia	Team Telekom/ZG Mobili–Selle Italia	DNF	

=== By team ===
Banesto
No.	Rider	Pos.
1	Miguel Induráin (ESP)	1
2	Marino Alonso (ESP)	78
3	Vicente Aparicio (ESP)	21
4	Thomas Davy (FRA)	80
5	Aitor Garmendia (ESP)	95
6	Ramón González Arrieta (ESP)	40
7	Carmelo Miranda (ESP)	57
8	Gérard Rué (FRA)	41
9	José Ramón Uriarte (ESP)	69

Gewiss–Ballan
No.	Rider	Pos.
11	Evgeni Berzin (RUS)	DNF
12	Guido Bontempi (ITA)	89
13	Dario Bottaro (ITA)	79
14	Bruno Cenghialta (ITA)	15
15	Gabriele Colombo (ITA)	51
16	Francesco Frattini (ITA)	77
17	Ivan Gotti (ITA)	5
18	Bjarne Riis (DEN)	3
19	Alberto Volpi (ITA)	65

Carrera Jeans–Tassoni
No.	Rider	Pos.
21	Marco Pantani (ITA)	13
22	Sergio Barbero (ITA)	DNF
23	Alessandro Bertolini (ITA)	DNF
24	Claudio Chiappucci (ITA)	11
25	Mario Chiesa (ITA)	DNF
26	Marcello Siboni (ITA)	84
27	Leonardo Sierra (VEN)	50
28	Enrico Zaina (ITA)	42
29	Beat Zberg (SUI)	29

Aki–Gipiemme
No.	Rider	Pos.
31	Zenon Jaskuła (POL)	46
32	Mauro Bettin (ITA)	99
33	Giuseppe Citterio (ITA)	DNF
34	René Foucachon (FRA)	DNF
35	Gianluca Gorini (ITA)	110
36	Dimitri Konyshev (RUS)	DNF
37	Dante Rezze (FRA)	DNF
38	Gilberto Simoni (ITA)	DNF
39	Denis Zanette (ITA)	DNF

Mapei–GB–Latexco
No.	Rider	Pos.
41	Tony Rominger (SUI)	8
42	Carlo Bomans (BEL)	DNF
43	Gianluca Bortolami (ITA)	DNF
44	Fernando Escartín (ESP)	7
45	Arsenio González (ESP)	23
46	Francisco Javier Mauleón (ESP)	DNF
47	Johan Museeuw (BEL)	73
48	Wilfried Peeters (BEL)	88
49	Andrea Tafi (ITA)	39

Festina–Lotus
No.	Rider	Pos.
51	Richard Virenque (FRA)	9
52	Bruno Boscardin (SUI)	DNF
53	Laurent Brochard (FRA)	28
54	Laurent Dufaux (SUI)	19
55	Pascal Hervé (FRA)	DNF
56	Stephen Hodge (AUS)	64
57	Fabian Jeker (SUI)	68
58	Lars Michaelsen (DEN)	DNF
59	Jean-Cyril Robin (FRA)	22

ONCE
No.	Rider	Pos.
61	Laurent Jalabert (FRA)	4
62	Erik Breukink (NED)	20
63	Johan Bruyneel (BEL)	31
64	Herminio Díaz Zabala (ESP)	35
65	Melcior Mauri (ESP)	6
66	Luis María Díaz De Otazu (ESP)	DNF
67	Mariano Rojas (ESP)	DNF
68	Neil Stephens (AUS)	60
69	Alex Zülle (SUI)	2

Lampre–Panaria
No.	Rider	Pos.
71	Maurizio Fondriest (ITA)	DNF
72	Wladimir Belli (ITA)	DNF
73	Roberto Conti (ITA)	DNF
74	Alessio Galletti (ITA)	83
75	Alexander Gontchenkov (UKR)	96
76	Davide Perona (ITA)	81
77	Marco Serpellini (ITA)	111
78	Ján Svorada (SVK)	DNF
79	Pavel Tonkov (RUS)	DNF

GAN
No.	Rider	Pos.
81	Chris Boardman (GBR)	DNF
82	Christophe Capelle (FRA)	DNF
83	Thierry Gouvenou (FRA)	DNF
84	Pascal Lance (FRA)	DNF
85	Yvon Ledanois (FRA)	30
86	François Lemarchand (FRA)	92
87	Francis Moreau (FRA)	DNF
88	Didier Rous (FRA)	55
89	Eddy Seigneur (FRA)	DNF

Polti–Granarolo–Santini
No.	Rider	Pos.
91	Georg Totschnig (AUT)	37
92	Dirk Baldinger (GER)	DNF
93	Éric Boyer (FRA)	DNF
94	Rossano Brasi (ITA)	102
95	Giovanni Fidanza (ITA)	108
96	Giovanni Lombardi (ITA)	103
97	Serguei Outschakov (UKR)	74
98	Oscar Pelliccioli (ITA)	32
99	Mario Scirea (ITA)	98

Kelme–Avianca
No.	Rider	Pos.
101	Laudelino Cubino (ESP)	27
102	Julio César Aguirre (COL)	DNF
103	Hernán Buenahora (COL)	10
104	Francisco Cabello (ESP)	DNF
105	Ángel Camargo (COL)	DNF
106	Héctor Castaño (COL)	DNF
107	Ángel Edo (ESP)	DNF
108	Federico Muñoz (COL)	24
109	José Ángel Vidal (ESP)	93

Motorola
No.	Rider	Pos.
111	Lance Armstrong (USA)	36
112	Frankie Andreu (USA)	82
113	Steve Bauer (CAN)	101
114	Fabio Casartelli (ITA)	DNF
115	Álvaro Mejía (COL)	16
116	Kaspars Ozers (LAT)	DNF
117	Andrea Peron (ITA)	44
118	Stephen Swart (NZL)	109
119	Sean Yates (GBR)	DNF

TVM–Polis Direct
No.	Rider	Pos.
121	Bo Hamburger (DEN)	17
122	Jeroen Blijlevens (NED)	DNF
123	Maarten den Bakker (NED)	52
124	Tristan Hoffman (NED)	DNF
125	Jelle Nijdam (NED)	DNF
126	Hendrik Redant (BEL)	DNF
127	Jesper Skibby (DEN)	49
128	Jim Van De Laer (BEL)	76
129	Bart Voskamp (NED)	113

Lotto–Isoglass
No.	Rider	Pos.
131	Andrei Tchmil (RUS)	71
132	Mario De Clercq (BEL)	DNF
133	Peter De Clercq (BEL)	DNF
134	Peter Farazijn (BEL)	105
135	Herman Frison (BEL)	DNF
136	Sammie Moreels (BEL)	DNF
137	Wilfried Nelissen (BEL)	DNF
138	Marc Sergeant (BEL)	DNF
139	Rudy Verdonck (BEL)	DNF

Castorama
No.	Rider	Pos.
141	Armand de Las Cuevas (FRA)	62
142	Jacky Durand (FRA)	DNF
143	Thierry Laurent (FRA)	DNF
144	Laurent Madouas (FRA)	12
145	Emmanuel Magnien (FRA)	DNF
146	Thierry Marie (FRA)	94
147	François Simon (FRA)	59
148	Gilles Talmant (FRA)	104
149	Bruno Thibout (FRA)	DNF

MG Maglificio–Technogym
No.	Rider	Pos.
151	Gianni Bugno (ITA)	53
152	Fabio Baldato (ITA)	DNF
153	Davide Cassani (ITA)	112
154	Alberto Elli (ITA)	33
155	Rolf Järmann (SUI)	67
156	Nicola Loda (ITA)	100
157	Max Sciandri (GBR)	47
158	Flavio Vanzella (ITA)	86
159	Franco Vona (ITA)	48

Novell–Decca–Colnago
No.	Rider	Pos.
161	Djamolidine Abdoujaparov (UZB)	56
162	Eddy Bouwmans (NED)	45
163	Erik Dekker (NED)	70
164	Viatcheslav Ekimov (RUS)	18
165	Frans Maassen (NED)	97
166	Frédéric Moncassin (FRA)	DNF
167	Arvis Piziks (LAT)	91
168	Léon van Bon (NED)	DNF
169	Marc Wauters (BEL)	DNF

Mercatone Uno–Saeco
No.	Rider	Pos.
171	Mario Cipollini (ITA)	DNF
172	Massimo Donati (ITA)	72
173	Gian Matteo Fagnini (ITA)	107
174	Rosario Fina (ITA)	DNF
175	Massimiliano Lelli (ITA)	43
176	Silvio Martinello (ITA)	DNF
177	Roberto Petito (ITA)	DNF
178	Eros Poli (ITA)	114
179	Antonio Politano (ITA)	DNF

Chazal–MBK–König
No.	Rider	Pos.
181	Miguel Arroyo (MEX)	61
182	Jean-François Bernard (FRA)	34
183	Jean-Pierre Bourgeot (FRA)	DNF
184	Gilles Bouvard (FRA)	63
185	Bruno Cornillet (FRA)	115
186	Gilles Delion (FRA)	DNF
187	Artūras Kasputis (LTU)	75
188	Jaan Kirsipuu (EST)	DNF
189	Christophe Mengin (FRA)	DNF

Brescialat–Fago
No.	Rider	Pos.
191	Massimo Podenzana (ITA)	26
192	Fausto Dotti (ITA)	DNF
193	Paolo Lanfranchi (ITA)	14
194	Angelo Lecchi (ITA)	DNF
195	Mario Manzoni (ITA)	DNF
196	Marco Milesi (ITA)	85
197	Giancarlo Perini (ITA)	87
198	Mauro Radaelli (ITA)	DNF
199	Eric Vanderaerden (BEL)	DNF

Team Telekom/ZG Mobili–Selle Italia
No.	Rider	Pos.
201	Rolf Aldag (GER)	58
202	Udo Bölts (GER)	38
203	Jens Heppner (GER)	66
204	Olaf Ludwig (GER)	DNF
205	Vladimir Poulnikov (UKR)	25
206	Erik Zabel (GER)	90
207	Stefano Colagè (ITA)	106
208	Andrea Ferrigato (ITA)	54
209	Nelson Rodríguez Serna (COL)	DNF

=== By nationality ===
Country	No. of riders	In competition	Stage wins
Australia	2	2	
Austria	1	1	
Belgium	16	5	1 (Johan Bruyneel )
Canada	1	1	
Colombia	7	3	
Denmark	4	3	
Estonia	1	0	
France	34	17	4 (Jacky Durand, Luc Leblanc, Laurent Jalabert, Richard Virenque)
Germany	6	4	2 (Erik Zabel x2)
Great Britain	3	1	1 (Maximilian Sciandri)
Italy	60	38	4 (Fabio Baldato, Mario Cipollini, Marco Pantani x2)
Latvia	1	0	
Lithuania	2	2	
Mexico	1	1	
Netherlands	10	6	1 (Jeroen Blijlevens)
New Zealand	1	1	
Poland	1	1	
Russia	5	2	
Slovakia	1	0	
Spain	18	13	2 (Miguel Indurain x2)
Switzerland	7	6	1 (Alex Zülle)
Ukraine	3	3	1 (Serguei Outschakov)
United States	3	2	1 (Lance Armstrong)
Uzbekistan	1	1	1 (Djamolidine Abdoujaparov)
Venezuela	1	1	
Total	189	115	19
