= List of teams and cyclists in the 1993 Giro d'Italia =

The 1993 Giro d'Italia was the 76th edition of the Giro d'Italia, one of cycling's Grand Tours. The field consisted of 180 riders, and 132 riders finished the race.

== By rider ==
Legend
No.	Starting number worn by the rider during the Giro
Pos.	Position in the general classification
DNF	Denotes a rider who did not finish

No.	Name	Nationality	Team	Ref
1	Miguel Induráin	Spain	Banesto	
2	José Luis Arrieta	Spain	Banesto	
3	Armand de Las Cuevas	France	Banesto	
4	José Luis de Santos	Spain	Banesto	
5	Stéphane Heulot	France	Banesto	
6	Prudencio Induráin	Spain	Banesto	
7	Fabrice Philipot	France	Banesto	
8	Gérard Rué	France	Banesto	
9	Francisco San Roman	Spain	Banesto	
11	Gianluigi Barsotelli	Italy	Amore & Vita–Galatron	
12	Stefano Giraldi	Italy	Amore & Vita–Galatron	
13	Giuseppe Calcaterra	Italy	Amore & Vita–Galatron	
14	Riccardo Forconi	Italy	Amore & Vita–Galatron	
15	Vincenzo Galati	Italy	Amore & Vita–Galatron	
16	Rodolfo Massi	Italy	Amore & Vita–Galatron	
17	Flavio Milan	Italy	Amore & Vita–Galatron	
18	Maurizio Molinari	Italy	Amore & Vita–Galatron	
19	Bruno Risi	Switzerland	Amore & Vita–Galatron	
21	Daniel Clavero	Spain	Artiach–Filipinos–Chiquilin	
22	Eduardo Chozas	Spain	Artiach–Filipinos–Chiquilin	
23	Luis Espinosa	Colombia	Artiach–Filipinos–Chiquilin	
24	Americo Neves	Portugal	Artiach–Filipinos–Chiquilin	
25	Orlando Rodrigues	Portugal	Artiach–Filipinos–Chiquilin	
26	Alfonso Gutiérrez	Spain	Artiach–Filipinos–Chiquilin	
27	Carmelo Miranda	Spain	Artiach–Filipinos–Chiquilin	
28	Asensio Navarro	Spain	Artiach–Filipinos–Chiquilin	
29	Vicente Ridaura	Spain	Artiach–Filipinos–Chiquilin	
31	Claudio Chiappucci	Italy	Carrera Jeans–Tassoni	
32	Stephen Roche	Ireland	Carrera Jeans–Tassoni	
33	Guido Bontempi	Italy	Carrera Jeans–Tassoni	
34	Marco Pantani	Italy	Carrera Jeans–Tassoni	
35	Vladimir Poulnikov	Ukraine	Carrera Jeans–Tassoni	
36	Remo Rossi	Italy	Carrera Jeans–Tassoni	
37	Fabio Roscioli	Italy	Carrera Jeans–Tassoni	
38	Mario Chiesa	Italy	Carrera Jeans–Tassoni	
39	Andrea Tafi	Italy	Carrera Jeans–Tassoni	
41	Luc Leblanc	France	Castorama	
42	Thierry Bourguignon	France	Castorama	
43	Philippe Bouvatier	France	Castorama	
44	Emmanuel Magnien	France	Castorama	
45	Laurent Desbiens	France	Castorama	
46	Laurent Madouas	France	Castorama	
47	Laurent Brochard	France	Castorama	
48	Dante Rezze	France	Castorama	
49	Bruno Thibout	France	Castorama	
51	Fabio Casartelli	Italy	Ariostea	
52	Bruno Cenghialta	Italy	Ariostea	
53	Roberto Conti	Italy	Ariostea	
54	Giorgio Furlan	Italy	Ariostea	
55	Massimiliano Lelli	Italy	Ariostea	
56	Davide Cassani	Italy	Ariostea	
57	Bjarne Riis	Denmark	Ariostea	
58	Marco Saligari	Italy	Ariostea	
59	Mauro Santaromita	Italy	Ariostea	
61	Marco Giovannetti	Italy	Mapei–Viner	
62	Mauro Consonni	Italy	Mapei–Viner	
63	Stefano Della Santa	Italy	Mapei–Viner	
64	Luca Gelfi	Italy	Mapei–Viner	
65	Juan Carlos González Salvador	Spain	Mapei–Viner	
66	Santos Hernández	Spain	Mapei–Viner	
67	Dario Nicoletti	Italy	Mapei–Viner	
68	Fabrizio Bontempi	Italy	Mapei–Viner	
69	Andrey Teteryuk	Kazakhstan	Mapei–Viner	
71	Jos van Aert	Netherlands	Festina–Lotus	
72	Falk Boden	Germany	Festina–Lotus	
73	Marco Finco	Italy	Festina–Lotus	
74	Romes Gainetdinov	Russia	Festina–Lotus	
75	Fernando Piñero	Spain	Festina–Lotus	
76	Yuri Manuylov	Russia	Festina–Lotus	
77	Xavier Perez Font	Spain	Festina–Lotus	
78	Eric Van Lancker	Belgium	Festina–Lotus	
79	Steven Rooks	Netherlands	Festina–Lotus	
81	Nicolas Aubier	France	GAN	
82	Laurent Bezault	France	GAN	
83	Christophe Capelle	France	GAN	
84	Philippe Casado	France	GAN	
85	Hervé Garel	France	GAN	
86	Greg LeMond	United States	GAN	
87	Francis Moreau	France	GAN	
88	Eddy Seigneur	France	GAN	
89	Jérôme Simon	France	GAN	
91	Gianni Bugno	Italy	Gatorade–Mega Drive–Kenwood	
92	Andrea Chiurato	Italy	Gatorade–Mega Drive–Kenwood	
93	Mario Manzoni	Italy	Gatorade–Mega Drive–Kenwood	
94	Abelardo Rondón	Colombia	Gatorade–Mega Drive–Kenwood	
95	Pello Ruiz Cabestany	Spain	Gatorade–Mega Drive–Kenwood	
96	Oscar Pelliccioli	Italy	Gatorade–Mega Drive–Kenwood	
97	Mario Scirea	Italy	Gatorade–Mega Drive–Kenwood	
98	Stefano Zanatta	Italy	Gatorade–Mega Drive–Kenwood	
99	Valerio Tebaldi	Italy	Gatorade–Mega Drive–Kenwood	
101	Valter Bonča	Slovenia	Jolly Componibili–Club 88	
102	Paolo Botarelli	Italy	Jolly Componibili–Club 88	
103	Maurizio Nuzzi	Italy	Jolly Componibili–Club 88	
104	Dimitri Konyshev	Russia	Jolly Componibili–Club 88	
105	Jean-Claude Leclercq	France	Jolly Componibili–Club 88	
106	Endrio Leoni	Italy	Jolly Componibili–Club 88	
107	Erich Maechler	Switzerland	Jolly Componibili–Club 88	
108	Dario Mariuzzo	Italy	Jolly Componibili–Club 88	
109	Marcello Siboni	Italy	Jolly Componibili–Club 88	
111	Asiat Saitov	Russia	Kelme–Xacobeo	
112	Hernán Buenahora	Colombia	Kelme–Xacobeo	
113	Néstor Mora	Colombia	Kelme–Xacobeo	
114	José Martín Farfán	Colombia	Kelme–Xacobeo	
115	José Diaz Martinez	Spain	Kelme–Xacobeo	
116	Julio César Cadena	Colombia	Kelme–Xacobeo	
117	Federico Muñoz	Colombia	Kelme–Xacobeo	
118	Luis-Felipe Moreno	Colombia	Kelme–Xacobeo	
119	Francisco Cabello	Spain	Kelme–Xacobeo	
121	Maurizio Fondriest	Italy	Lampre–Polti	
122	Gianluca Bortolami	Italy	Lampre–Polti	
123	Stefano Allocchio	Italy	Lampre–Polti	
124	Wladimir Belli	Italy	Lampre–Polti	
125	Acácio da Silva	Portugal	Lampre–Polti	
126	Alexander Gontchenkov	Ukraine	Lampre–Polti	
127	Pavel Tonkov	Russia	Lampre–Polti	
128	Ján Svorada	Slovakia	Lampre–Polti	
129	Marco Zen	Italy	Lampre–Polti	
131	Moreno Argentin	Italy	Mecair–Ballan	
132	Piotr Ugrumov	Ukraine	Mecair–Ballan	
133	Alberto Volpi	Italy	Mecair–Ballan	
134	Heinz Imboden	Switzerland	Mecair–Ballan	
135	Dario Bottaro	Italy	Mecair–Ballan	
136	Evgeni Berzin	Russia	Mecair–Ballan	
137	Vladislav Bobrik	Russia	Mecair–Ballan	
138	Gianvito Martinelli	Italy	Mecair–Ballan	
139	Andreas Kappes	Germany	Mecair–Ballan	
141	Adriano Baffi	Italy	Mercatone Uno–Zucchini–Medeghini	
142	Fabio Bordonali	Italy	Mercatone Uno–Zucchini–Medeghini	
143	Mariano Piccoli	Italy	Mercatone Uno–Zucchini–Medeghini	
144	Francesco Casagrande	Italy	Mercatone Uno–Zucchini–Medeghini	
145	Flavio Giupponi	Italy	Mercatone Uno–Zucchini–Medeghini	
146	Bruno Leali	Italy	Mercatone Uno–Zucchini–Medeghini	
147	Adri van der Poel	Netherlands	Mercatone Uno–Zucchini–Medeghini	
148	Enrico Zaina	Italy	Mercatone Uno–Zucchini–Medeghini	
149	Giuseppe Petito	Italy	Mercatone Uno–Zucchini–Medeghini	
151	Fabio Baldato	Italy	GB–MG Maglificio	
152	Franco Chioccioli	Italy	GB–MG Maglificio	
153	Zenon Jaskuła	Poland	GB–MG Maglificio	
154	Roberto Gusmeroli	Italy	GB–MG Maglificio	
155	Laurent Pillon	France	GB–MG Maglificio	
156	Franco Vona	Italy	GB–MG Maglificio	
157	Andrei Tchmil	Moldova	GB–MG Maglificio	
158	Flavio Vanzella	Italy	GB–MG Maglificio	
159	Eros Poli	Italy	GB–MG Maglificio	
161	Andrew Hampsten	United States	Motorola	
162	Norman Alvis	United States	Motorola	
163	Steve Bauer	Canada	Motorola	
164	Michel Dernies	Belgium	Motorola	
165	Kai Hundertmarck	Germany	Motorola	
166	Steve Larsen	United States	Motorola	
167	Christophe Manin	France	Motorola	
168	Álvaro Mejía	Colombia	Motorola	
169	Bjørn Stenersen	Norway	Motorola	
171	Roberto Pagnin	Italy	Navigare–Blue Storm	
172	Stefano Zanini	Italy	Navigare–Blue Storm	
173	Fabiano Fontanelli	Italy	Navigare–Blue Storm	
174	Massimo Podenzana	Italy	Navigare–Blue Storm	
175	Alexandr Shefer	Russia	Navigare–Blue Storm	
176	Masatoshi Ichikawa	Japan	Navigare–Blue Storm	
177	Michele Coppolillo	Italy	Navigare–Blue Storm	
178	Luboš Lom	Czech Republic	Navigare–Blue Storm	
179	Angelo Citracca	Italy	Navigare–Blue Storm	
181	Rolf Aldag	Germany	Team Telekom	
182	Uwe Ampler	Germany	Team Telekom	
183	Udo Bölts	Germany	Team Telekom	
184	Bernd Gröne	Germany	Team Telekom	
185	Jens Heppner	Germany	Team Telekom	
186	Mario Kummer	Germany	Team Telekom	
187	Uwe Raab	Germany	Team Telekom	
188	Steffen Wesemann	Germany	Team Telekom	
189	Christian Henn	Germany	Team Telekom	
191	Leonardo Sierra	Venezuela	ZG Mobili	
192	Massimo Ghirotto	Italy	ZG Mobili	
193	Giancarlo Perini	Italy	ZG Mobili	
194	Gianni Faresin	Italy	ZG Mobili	
195	Stefano Colagè	Italy	ZG Mobili	
196	Michele Moro	Italy	ZG Mobili	
197	Diego Trepin	Italy	ZG Mobili	
198	Roberto Caruso	Italy	ZG Mobili	
199	Nelson Rodríguez	Colombia	ZG Mobili	
