= List of teams and cyclists in the 1994 Giro d'Italia =

The 1994 Giro d'Italia was the 77th edition of the Giro d'Italia, one of cycling's Grand Tours. The field consisted of 153 riders, and 99 riders finished the race.

== By rider ==
Legend
No.	Starting number worn by the rider during the Giro
Pos.	Position in the general classification
DNF	Denotes a rider who did not finish

No.	Name	Nationality	Team	Ref
1	Miguel Induráin	Spain	Banesto	
2	José Luis Arrieta	Spain	Banesto	
3	Santiago Crespo	Spain	Banesto	
4	Stéphane Heulot	France	Banesto	
5	Prudencio Induráin	Spain	Banesto	
6	Jesús Montoya	Spain	Banesto	
7	Gérard Rué	France	Banesto	
8	José Ramón Uriarte	Spain	Banesto	
9	Erwin Nijboer	Netherlands	Banesto	
11	Riccardo Forconi	Italy	Amore & Vita–Galatron	
12	Simone Borgheresi	Italy	Amore & Vita–Galatron	
13	Giuseppe Calcaterra	Italy	Amore & Vita–Galatron	
14	Gianluca Pierobon	Italy	Amore & Vita–Galatron	
15	Alessio Di Basco	Italy	Amore & Vita–Galatron	
16	Rodolfo Massi	Italy	Amore & Vita–Galatron	
17	Walter Bonca	Slovenia	Amore & Vita–Galatron	
18	Maurizio Molinari	Italy	Amore & Vita–Galatron	
19	Antonio Fanelli	Italy	Amore & Vita–Galatron	
21	Flavio Giupponi	Italy	Brescialat–Ceramiche Refin	
22	Bruno Leali	Italy	Brescialat–Ceramiche Refin	
23	Fabio Bordonali	Italy	Brescialat–Ceramiche Refin	
24	Luca Gelfi	Italy	Brescialat–Ceramiche Refin	
25	Fabio Roscioli	Italy	Brescialat–Ceramiche Refin	
26	Eric Vanderaerden	Belgium	Brescialat–Ceramiche Refin	
27	Roberto Pelliconi	Italy	Brescialat–Ceramiche Refin	
28	Felice Puttini	Switzerland	Brescialat–Ceramiche Refin	
29	Heinz Imboden	Switzerland	Brescialat–Ceramiche Refin	
31	Claudio Chiappucci	Italy	Carrera Jeans–Tassoni	
32	Vladimir Poulnikov	Ukraine	Carrera Jeans–Tassoni	
33	Leonardo Sierra	Venezuela	Carrera Jeans–Tassoni	
34	Marco Pantani	Italy	Carrera Jeans–Tassoni	
35	Mario Chiesa	Italy	Carrera Jeans–Tassoni	
36	Samuele Schiavina	Italy	Carrera Jeans–Tassoni	
37	Stefano Checchin	Italy	Carrera Jeans–Tassoni	
38	Marco Artunghi	Italy	Carrera Jeans–Tassoni	
39	Remo Rossi	Italy	Carrera Jeans–Tassoni	
41	Armand de Las Cuevas	France	Castorama	
42	Thierry Bourguignon	France	Castorama	
43	Laurent Brochard	France	Castorama	
44	Thomas Davy	France	Castorama	
45	Fabian Jeker	Switzerland	Castorama	
46	Laurent Madouas	France	Castorama	
47	Thierry Marie	France	Castorama	
48	Jean-Cyril Robin	France	Castorama	
49	Heinrich Trumheller	Germany	Castorama	
51	Fabio Baldato	Italy	GB–MG Maglificio	
52	Davide Rebellin	Italy	GB–MG Maglificio	
53	Pascal Richard	Switzerland	GB–MG Maglificio	
54	Marco Saligari	Italy	GB–MG Maglificio	
55	Max Sciandri	Italy	GB–MG Maglificio	
56	Luca Scinto	Italy	GB–MG Maglificio	
57	Rolf Sørensen	Denmark	GB–MG Maglificio	
58	Flavio Vanzella	Italy	GB–MG Maglificio	
59	Franco Vona	Italy	GB–MG Maglificio	
61	Giorgio Furlan	Italy	Gewiss–Ballan	
62	Moreno Argentin	Italy	Gewiss–Ballan	
63	Guido Bontempi	Italy	Gewiss–Ballan	
64	Evgeni Berzin	Russia	Gewiss–Ballan	
65	Alberto Volpi	Italy	Gewiss–Ballan	
66	Piotr Ugrumov	Ukraine	Gewiss–Ballan	
67	Bjarne Riis	Denmark	Gewiss–Ballan	
68	Bruno Cenghialta	Italy	Gewiss–Ballan	
69	Enrico Zaina	Italy	Gewiss–Ballan	
71	Zenon Jaskuła	Poland	Jolly Componibili–Cage 1994	
72	Dimitri Konyshev	Russia	Jolly Componibili–Cage 1994	
73	Endrio Leoni	Italy	Jolly Componibili–Cage 1994	
74	René Foucachon	France	Jolly Componibili–Cage 1994	
75	Laurent Pillon	France	Jolly Componibili–Cage 1994	
76	Dante Rezze	France	Jolly Componibili–Cage 1994	
77	Stefano Zanatta	Italy	Jolly Componibili–Cage 1994	
78	Fausto Dotti	Italy	Jolly Componibili–Cage 1994	
79	Gianluca Gorini	Italy	Jolly Componibili–Cage 1994	
81	Laudelino Cubino	Spain	Kelme–Avianca–Gios	
82	Augusto Triana	Colombia	Kelme–Avianca–Gios	
83	Federico Muñoz	Colombia	Kelme–Avianca–Gios	
84	Andrei Sypytkowski	Poland	Kelme–Avianca–Gios	
85	Néstor Mora	Colombia	Kelme–Avianca–Gios	
86	Libardo Niño	Colombia	Kelme–Avianca–Gios	
87	José Ángel Vidal	Spain	Kelme–Avianca–Gios	
88	Julio César Ortegón	Colombia	Kelme–Avianca–Gios	
89	Hernán Buenahora	Colombia	Kelme–Avianca–Gios	
91	Pavel Tonkov	Russia	Lampre–Panaria	
92	Wladimir Belli	Italy	Lampre–Panaria	
93	Davide Bramati	Italy	Lampre–Panaria	
94	Roberto Conti	Italy	Lampre–Panaria	
95	Gianni Faresin	Italy	Lampre–Panaria	
96	Mirco Gualdi	Italy	Lampre–Panaria	
97	Giovanni Lombardi	Italy	Lampre–Panaria	
98	Zbigniew Spruch	Poland	Lampre–Panaria	
99	Ján Svorada	Slovakia	Lampre–Panaria	
101	Franco Ballerini	Italy	Mapei–CLAS	
102	Gianluca Bortolami	Italy	Mapei–CLAS	
103	Andrea Chiurato	Italy	Mapei–CLAS	
104	Stefano Della Santa	Italy	Mapei–CLAS	
105	Marco Giovannetti	Italy	Mapei–CLAS	
106	Dario Nicoletti	Italy	Mapei–CLAS	
107	Andrea Noè	Italy	Mapei–CLAS	
108	Valerio Tebaldi	Italy	Mapei–CLAS	
109	Andrey Teteryuk	Kazakhstan	Mapei–CLAS	
111	Michele Bartoli	Italy	Mercatone Uno–Medeghini	
112	Francesco Casagrande	Italy	Mercatone Uno–Medeghini	
113	Franco Chioccioli	Italy	Mercatone Uno–Medeghini	
114	Adriano Baffi	Italy	Mercatone Uno–Medeghini	
115	Paolo Fornaciari	Italy	Mercatone Uno–Medeghini	
116	Eros Poli	Italy	Mercatone Uno–Medeghini	
117	Massimiliano Lelli	Italy	Mercatone Uno–Medeghini	
118	Mariano Piccoli	Italy	Mercatone Uno–Medeghini	
119	Silvio Martinello	Italy	Mercatone Uno–Medeghini	
121	Raúl Alcalá	Mexico	Motorola	
122	Michel Dernies	Belgium	Motorola	
123	Andrew Hampsten	United States	Motorola	
124	Steve Larsen	United States	Motorola	
125	Gabriele Rampollo	Italy	Motorola	
126	Álvaro Mejía	Colombia	Motorola	
127	Jan Schur	Germany	Motorola	
128	Brian Smith	Great Britain	Motorola	
129	Bjørn Stenersen	Norway	Motorola	
131	Michele Coppolillo	Italy	Navigare–Blue Storm	
132	Massimo Podenzana	Italy	Navigare–Blue Storm	
133	Stefano Zanini	Italy	Navigare–Blue Storm	
134	Fabrizio Settembrini	Italy	Navigare–Blue Storm	
135	Roberto Pagnin	Italy	Navigare–Blue Storm	
136	Giuseppe Guerini	Italy	Navigare–Blue Storm	
137	Luboš Lom	Czech Republic	Navigare–Blue Storm	
138	Massimo Strazzer	Italy	Navigare–Blue Storm	
139	Angelo Citracca	Italy	Navigare–Blue Storm	
141	Gianni Bugno	Italy	Team Polti–Vaporetto	
142	Djamolidine Abdoujaparov	Uzbekistan	Team Polti–Vaporetto	
143	Giovanni Fidanza	Italy	Team Polti–Vaporetto	
144	Ivan Gotti	Italy	Team Polti–Vaporetto	
145	Serguei Outschakov	Ukraine	Team Polti–Vaporetto	
146	Oscar Pelliccioli	Italy	Team Polti–Vaporetto	
147	Mario Scirea	Italy	Team Polti–Vaporetto	
148	Georg Totschnig	Austria	Team Polti–Vaporetto	
149	Dimitri Zhdanov	Russia	Team Polti–Vaporetto	
151	Udo Bölts	Germany	Team Telekom	
152	Jens Heppner	Germany	Team Telekom	
153	Christian Henn	Germany	Team Telekom	
154	Dominik Krieger	Germany	Team Telekom	
155	Mario Kummer	Germany	Team Telekom	
156	Uwe Raab	Germany	Team Telekom	
157	Marc van Orsouw	Netherlands	Team Telekom	
158	Jürgen Werner	Germany	Team Telekom	
159	Steffen Wesemann	Germany	Team Telekom	
161	Fabio Casartelli	Italy	ZG Mobili	
162	Andrea Ferrigato	Italy	ZG Mobili	
163	Fabiano Fontanelli	Italy	ZG Mobili	
164	Massimo Ghirotto	Italy	ZG Mobili	
165	Raúl Montaña	Colombia	ZG Mobili	
166	Giancarlo Perini	Italy	ZG Mobili	
167	Hendrik Redant	Belgium	ZG Mobili	
168	Nelson Rodríguez Serna	Colombia	ZG Mobili	
169	Mauro-Antonio Santaromita	Italy	ZG Mobili	
