= List of songs written by Isaac Hayes and David Porter =

This is a list of songs written by Isaac Hayes and David Porter, including those written by Hayes or Porter solo, or with other writers.

== Chart hits and other notable songs written by Isaac Hayes and David Porter ==
Year	Song	Original artist	^{U.S. Pop}	^{U.S. R&B}	^{UK Singles Chart}	Other charting versions, and notes
1966	"I Got to Love Somebody's Baby"	Johnnie Taylor	-	15	-	
1966	"I Had a Dream"	Johnnie Taylor	-	19	-	
1966	"I'll Run Your Hurt Away"	Ruby Johnson	-	31	-	
1966	"You Don't Know Like I Know"	Sam and Dave	90	7	-	1980: Genty, #51 R&B
1966	"Hold On, I'm Comin'"	Sam and Dave	21	1	-	1967: Chuck Jackson and Maxine Brown, #91 US pop, #29 R&B
1966	"Let Me Be Good to You "	Carla Thomas	62	11	-	Written by Hayes, Porter, and Carl Wells
1966	"Your Good Thing (Is About to End)"	Mable John	95	6	-	1969: Lou Rawls, #18 US pop, #3 R&B; 1977: Paulette Reaves, "Your Real Good Thing's About to Come to an End", #89 R&B
1966	"B-A-B-Y"	Carla Thomas	14	3	-	1978: Rachel Sweet, #35 UK
1966	"Said I Wasn't Gonna Tell Nobody"	Sam and Dave	64	8	-	
1966	"Never Like This Before"	William Bell	-	29	-	Written by Hayes, Porter, and Booker T. Jones
1966	"You Got Me Hummin'"	Sam and Dave	77	7	-	1970: Cold Blood, #52 US pop
1967	"Sophisticated Sissy"	Rufus Thomas	-	43	-	Written by Hayes, Porter, Mack Rice, and Joe Shamwell
1967	"Something Good (Is Going to Happen to You)"	Carla Thomas	74	29	-	
1967	"When Something Is Wrong with My Baby"	Sam and Dave	42	2	-	1983: Johnny Gill, #57 R&B; 1990: Linda Ronstadt and Aaron Neville, #78 R&B
1967	"When Tomorrow Comes"	Carla Thomas	99	-	-	
1967	"I Take What I Want"	James and Bobby Purify	41	23	-	Written by Hayes, Porter, and Mabon "Teenie" Hodges
1967	"How Can You Mistreat the One You Love"	Jean & the Darlings	96	-	-	
1967	"Soul Man"	Sam and Dave	2	1	24	1967: Ramsey Lewis, #49 US pop 1978: The Blues Brothers, #14 US pop 1987: Sam Moore and Lou Reed, #30 UK; 1990: The Blues Brothers, #79 UK (reissue)
1968	"Check Yourself"	Debbie Taylor	-	37	-	
1968	"Give 'Em Love"	The Soul Children	-	40	-	
1968	"I Ain't Particular"	Johnnie Taylor	-	45	-	
1968	"I Thank You"	Sam and Dave	9	4	-	1980: ZZ Top, #34 US pop
1968	"Wrap It Up"	Sam and Dave	-	-	-	1970: Archie Bell & the Drells, #93 US pop, #33 R&B; 1986: The Fabulous Thunderbirds, #50 US pop
1968	"60 Minutes of Your Love"	Homer Banks	-	-	55	
1968	"Everybody Got to Believe in Somebody"	Sam and Dave	73	-	-	
1968	"Soul Sister, Brown Sugar"	Sam and Dave	41	18	15	
1968	"My Baby Specializes"	Judy Clay and William Bell	-	45	-	
1969	"I'll Understand"	The Soul Children	-	29	-	
1969	"Tighten Up My Thang"	The Soul Children	-	49	-	
1969	"Born Again"	Sam and Dave	92	27	-	
1969	"The Best Part of a Love Affair "	The Emotions	-	27	-	
1969	"The Sweeter He Is"	The Soul Children	52	7	-	
1970	"Stealing Love"	The Emotions	-	40	-	
1970	"Guide Me Well"	Carla Thomas	-	41	-	
1971	"Show Me How"	The Emotions	52	13	-	

== Chart hits and other notable songs written by Isaac Hayes solo ==
Year	Song	Original artist	^{U.S. Pop}	^{U.S. R&B}	^{UK Singles Chart}	Other charting versions, and notes
1971	"Theme from Shaft"	Isaac Hayes	1	2	4	1985: Eddy & the Soul Band, #13 UK; 2000: Isaac Hayes, #53 UK (reissue)
1972	"Do Your Thing"	Isaac Hayes	30	3	-	1975: James and Bobby Purify, #30 R&B
1972	"Theme from the Men"	Isaac Hayes	38	19	-	
1973	"Joy"	Isaac Hayes	30	7	-	
1974	"Title Theme from Three Tough Guys"	Isaac Hayes	-	72	-	
1974	"Wonderful"	Isaac Hayes	71	18	-	
1975	"Come Live with Me"	Isaac Hayes	-	20	-	
1975	"Chocolate Chip"	Isaac Hayes	92	13	-	
1976	"Rock Me Easy Baby"	Isaac Hayes	-	58	-	
1976	"Disco Connection"	Isaac Hayes	-	60	10	
1978	"Moonlight Lovin' (Ménage à Trois)"	Isaac Hayes	-	96	-	
1978	"Out of the Ghetto"	Isaac Hayes	-	42	-	
1979	"Zeke the Freak"	Isaac Hayes	-	19	-	
1980	"A Few More Kisses to Go"	Isaac Hayes	-	89	-	
1980	"I Ain't Never"	Isaac Hayes	-	49	-	
1980	"Body Language"	Patti Austin	-	45	-	
1986	"Ike's Rap"	Isaac Hayes	-	9	-	
1987	"Thing For You"	Isaac Hayes	-	43	-	
1988	"Showdown"	Isaac Hayes	-	40	-	

== Chart hits and other notable songs written by Isaac Hayes with other writers ==
Year	Song	Original artist	^{U.S. Pop}	^{U.S. R&B}	^{UK Singles Chart}	Other charting versions, and notes
1965	"Candy"	The Astors	63	12	-	Written by Isaac Hayes and Steve Cropper
1966	"Patch My Heart"	The Mad Lads	-	41	-	Written by Isaac Hayes and Steve Cropper
1969	"Must Be Your Thing"	Charles Wright & the Watts 103rd Street Rhythm Band	-	35	-	Written by Isaac Hayes and Charles Wright
1979	"Déjà Vu"	Dionne Warwick	15	25	-	Written by Isaac Hayes and Adrienne Anderson
1980	"Shoot Your Best Shot"	Linda Clifford	-	43	-	Written by Isaac Hayes and Mignon Hayes
1982	"I Love Your Love"	Donald Byrd & 125th Street, N.Y.C.	-	77	-	Written by Isaac Hayes, Aaron Mills, Andrew Stevens, and William Duckett
1982	"Sexy Dancer"	Donald Byrd & 125th Street, N.Y.C	-	49	-	Written by Isaac Hayes and Donald Byrd
1996	"Love Can't Turn Around"	Heavy Weather	-	-	56	Written by Isaac Hayes and Jessa Saunders
1997	"Why Oh Why"	Spearhead	-	-	45	Written by Isaac Hayes and Michael Franti
2000	"Separated"	Avant	23	1	-	Written by Isaac Hayes and Steve Huff
2000	"Treat Her Like a Lady"	Joe	63	15	60	Written by Isaac Hayes and Steve Huff
2011	"Let Me Go"	Maverick Sabre	-	-	16	Written by Isaac Hayes, Matthew Prime and Michael Stafford

== Chart hits and other notable songs written by David Porter solo or with other writers ==
Year	Song	Original artist	^{U.S. Pop}	^{U.S. R&B}	^{UK Singles Chart}	Other charting versions, and notes
1970	"Can't See You When I Want To "	David Porter	-	29	-	Written by David Porter and Ed Lee
1975	"Ain't No Need of Crying"	The Rance Allen Group	-	61	-	Written by David Porter
1976	"Hold On to Me"	John Edwards	-	59	-	Written by David Porter and Ronald Williams
1977	"Where Is Your Woman Tonight?"	The Soul Children	-	96	-	Written by David Porter and Bettye Crutcher
1984	"All Time Lover"	Lou Rawls	-	67	-	Written by David Porter and Donald O'Connor
1984	"Moonwalk"	Earth, Wind and Fire	-	67	-	Written by David Porter and Donald O'Connor
1996	"Love Me Now"	Briana Corrigan	-	-	48	Written by David Porter, Briana Corrigan and Ritchie Fermie
