= Genty =

Genty is a French surname. Notable people with the surname include:

- Charles Genty (1876–1956), French painter, illustrator, and caricaturist
- Jean-Claude Genty (born 1945), French racing cyclist
- Laurent Genty (born 1971), French racing cyclist
- Yann Genty (born 1981), French handball player
