= Sergio Previtali (cyclist) =

Italian cyclist

Personal information
- Born: 27 March 1969 (age 57)

Cycling career
- Sport: Cycling
- Role: Rider

Sergio Previtali (born 27 March 1969) is an Italian racing cyclist. He rode in the 1996 Tour de France. In 1994he won the Coppa Collecchio.
