= Frédéric Pontier =

French cyclist

Personal information
- Born: 10 September 1970 (age 56) Évreux, France

Cycling career
- Sport: Cycling
- Current team: Retired
- Discipline: Road
- Role: Rider

Amateur teams
- 1993: CM Aubervilliers
- 1998: VC Saint-Quentin

Professional teams
- 1994–1996: Aubervilliers 93
- 1997: Casino

Frédéric Pontier (born 10 September 1970) is a French former professional racing cyclist. He rode in the 1996 Tour de France and the 1997 Vuelta a España but did not finish either.

== Major results ==
1992
2nd Tour de la Somme
1993
1st Tour de la Somme
1994
1st Stage 4 Tour du Vaucluse
9th Overall Étoile de Bessèges
1995
1st Stage 3 Tour de l'Avenir
1st Stage 3 Tour du Vaucluse
4th Road race, National Road Championships
9th Overall Tour du Limousin
1996
1st Overall Tour de Normandie

1st Stages 3 & 5

9th GP de la Ville de Rennes
1997
1st Stage 3 Tour du Poitou Charentes et de la Vienne
5th A Travers le Morbihan
1998
1st Overall Tour du Loir-et-Cher

1st Stage 3
