= Agrigel–La Creuse–Fenioux =

French cycling team

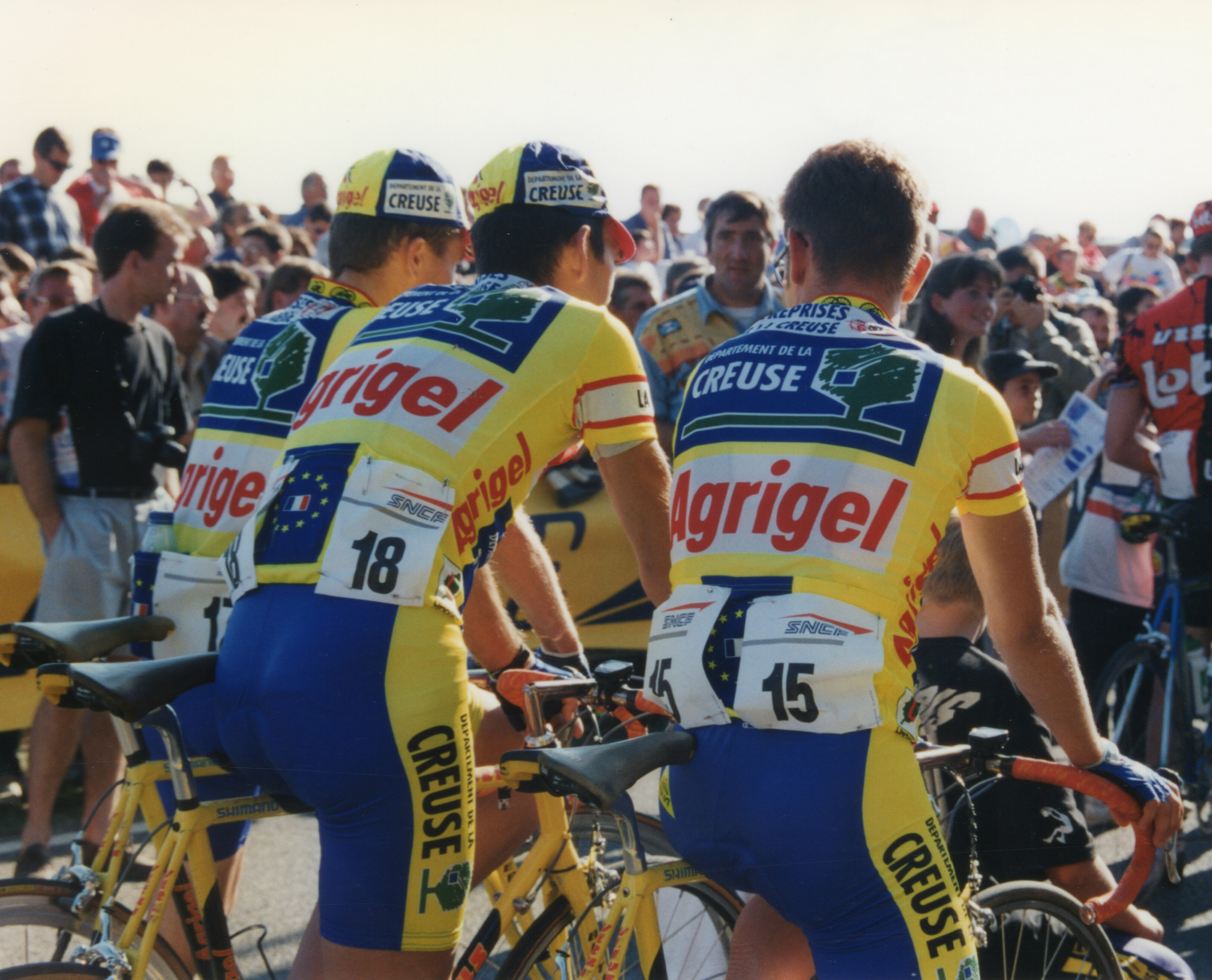
- Agrigel–La Creuse riders at the 1996 Critérium de Lèves

Team information
- UCI code: AGR
- Registered: France
- Founded: 1996
- Disbanded: 1996
- Discipline: Road
- Bicycles: Vitus

Key personnel
- General manager: Marc Durant; Gilles Mas

Team name history
- 1996: Agrigel–La Creuse–Fenioux

Agrigel–La Creuse–Fenioux was a French professional cycling team that existed in 1996. The team participated in the 1996 Tour de France.

== Team roster ==
The following is a list of riders on the Agrigel–La Creuse squad during the 1996 season, with age given for 1 January 1996.

Rider	Date of birth
Dominique Arnould (FRA)	19 November 1966 (aged 29)
Jean-François Bernard (FRA)	2 May 1962 (aged 33)
Pierangelo Bincoletto (ITA)	14 March 1959 (aged 36)
Jean-Pierre Bourgeot (FRA)	25 November 1968 (aged 27)
Franck Bouyer (FRA)	17 March 1974 (aged 21)
Vincent Cali (FRA)	22 April 1970 (aged 25)
Steve Clausse (BEL)	4 November 1974 (aged 21)
Jean-Claude Colotti (FRA)	1 July 1961 (aged 34)
Stéphane Conan (FRA)	28 June 1972 (aged 23)

Rider	Date of birth
Jacky Durand (FRA)	10 February 1967 (aged 28)
Hervé Garel (FRA)	15 July 1967 (aged 28)
Thierry Laurent (FRA)	13 September 1966 (aged 29)
Jérôme Laveur-Pedoux (FRA)	5 July 1973 (aged 22)
Denis Marie (FRA)	16 April 1970 (aged 25)
Thierry Marie (FRA)	25 June 1963 (aged 32)
Jean-Luc Masdupuy (FRA)	14 May 1969 (aged 26)
Grzegorz Rosoliński (POL)	21 May 1972 (aged 23)
Michel Vermote (BEL)	31 March 1963 (aged 32)
