= Antonio Politano =

Italian cyclist (born 1967)

Personal information
- Born: 17 January 1967 (age 59) Pisa, Italy

Cycling career
- Sport: Cycling
- Role: Rider

Antonio Politano (born 17 January 1967) is an Italian former professional racing cyclist. He rode in the 1995 Tour de France.
