= Franck Bouyer =

French cyclist (born 1974)

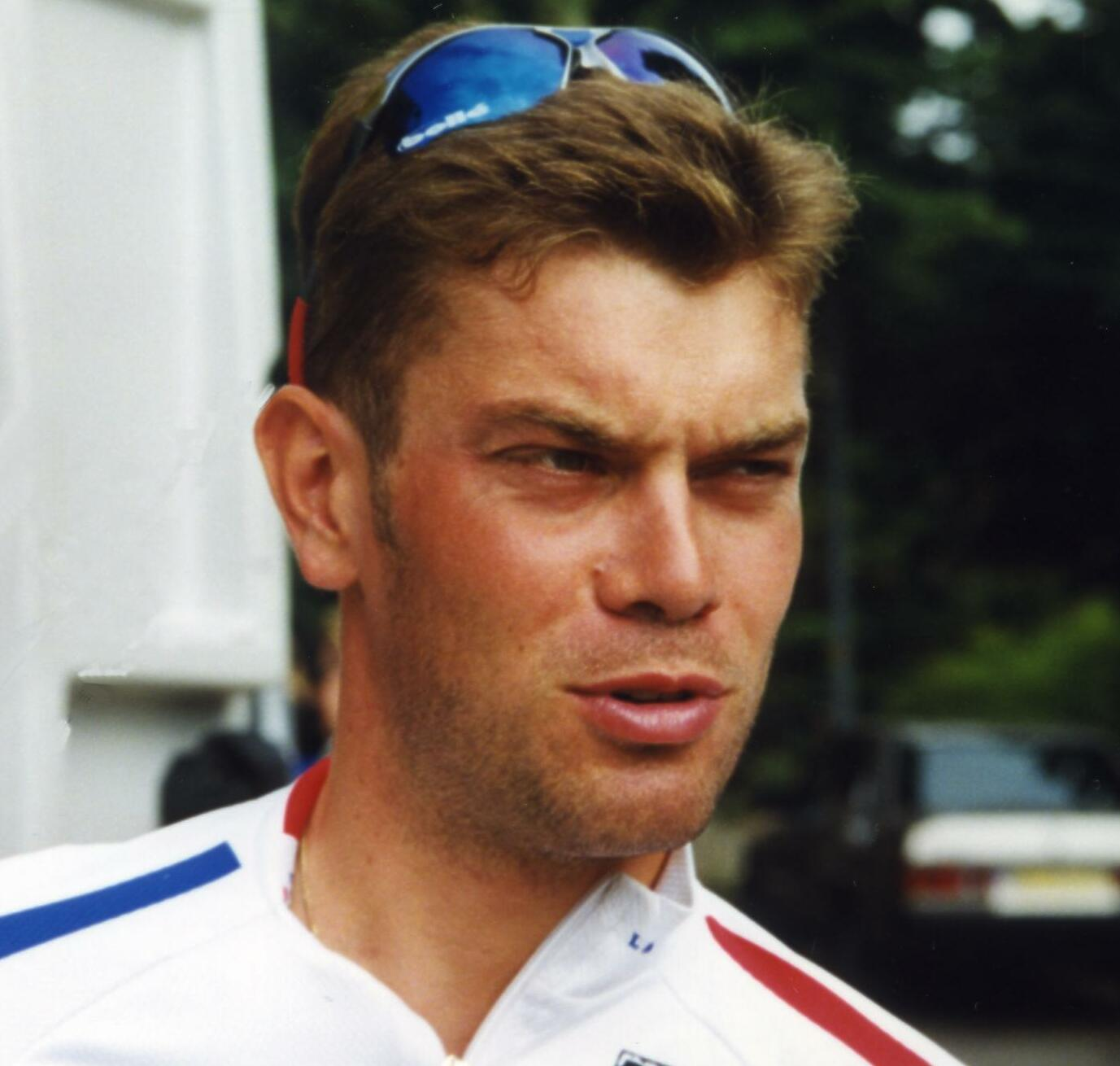

Personal information
- Full name: Franck Bouyer
- Born: 17 March 1974 (age 52) Beaupréau, France

Cycling career
- Sport: Cycling
- Discipline: Road
- Role: Rider

Professional teams
- 1995: Castorama
- 1996: Agrigel–La Creuse–Fenioux
- 1997–1999: Française des Jeux
- 2000–2006: Bonjour
- 2009–2013: Bbox Bouygues Telecom

Major wins
- Tour du Limousin (2001); Tour de Vendée (2002); Paris–Camembert (2004)

Franck Bouyer (born 17 March 1974, in Beaupréau) is a French former professional road bicycle racer, who competed as a professional between 1995 and 2013. Bouyer competed for the Castorama, Agrigel–La Creuse–Fenioux, Française des Jeux, Bouygues Télécom and Team Europcar squads during his career. Bouyer has narcolepsy, resulting in sudden sleep attacks and cataplexy, and was unable to compete or train without Modafinil.

However, the UCI ruled in June 2004 that Bouyer could not be given a therapeutic use exemption to allow him to compete having taken the drug, so Bouyer was unable to race. The Court of Arbitration for Sport (CAS) upheld the decision of the UCI citing that it could not be determined that Modafinil did not provide an extra increase in performance and that the dosage was hard to measure. Despite the rulings by both the UCI and CAS, the World Anti-Doping Agency (WADA) gave Bouyer permission to return to racing in August 2005. Yet, following an appeal to CAS by the UCI, Bouyer was once again banned. In January 2007, Bouyer's contract with Bouygues Télécom expired and the team released him. Bouyer filed a civil lawsuit against the UCI and WADA in July 2007, arguing they were preventing him from working. After confirmation from the UCI that a new drug for treating narcolepsy (Xyrem) was not on the banned list, he signed again for the Bbox Bouygues Telecom team for the 2009 season.

Bouyer retired at the end of the 2013 season.

== Career achievements ==
=== Major results ===
1999
4th A Travers le Morbihan
8th Giro della Provincia di Siracusa
2000
4th Grand Prix de la Ville de Lillers
2001
1st Overall Tour du Limousin

1st Stage 1

3rd Overall Circuit de la Sarthe
4th GP de la Ville de Rennes
8th Boucles de l'Aulne
9th Grand Prix de Cholet-Pays de Loire
2002
1st Tour de Vendée
2nd Grand Prix de Cholet-Pays de Loire
3rd Trophée des Grimpeurs
5th Boucles de l'Aulne
10th Overall Tour du Limousin
10th Tour du Haut Var
2003
2nd Grand Prix de Cholet-Pays de Loire
3rd Overall Étoile de Bessèges
7th Tour du Finistère
2004
1st Paris–Camembert
2nd Overall Circuit de la Sarthe

1st Stage 1

4th Tour de Vendée
2010
1st Overall Tour de Bretagne
2011
9th Overall Boucles de la Mayenne
2013
7th Overall Boucles de la Mayenne

=== Grand Tour general classification results timeline ===
Grand Tour	1996	1997	1998	1999	2000	2001	2002	2003	2004	2005	2006	2007	2008	2009
Giro d'Italia	—	—	—	—	—	DNF	—	—	—	—	—	—	—	—
Tour de France	DNF	—	94	—	122	74	114	—	—	—	—	—	—	—
Vuelta a España	—	—	—	—	—	—	—	—	—	—	—	—	—	DNF

Legend
DSQ	Disqualified
DNF	Did not finish
