= Omar Pumar =

Venezuelan bicycle racer

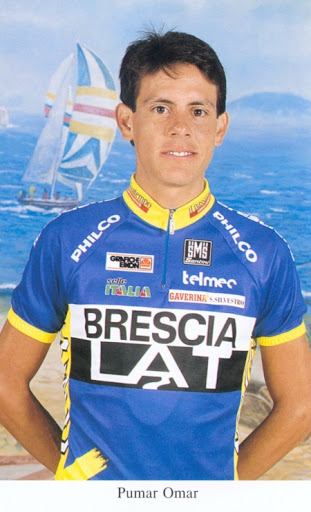

Personal information
- Full name: Omar Enrique Pumar Roldan
- Born: 18 May 1970 (age 56) Caracas, Venezuela

Cycling career
- Sport: Cycling
- Current team: Retired
- Discipline: Road
- Role: Rider
- Rider type: Sprinter

Amateur team
- 1994: Brescialat–Ceramiche Refin (stagiaire)

Professional teams
- 1995: Brescialat–Fago
- 1996: Sam Marco Group
- 1996–1997: Brescialat

Omar Pumar (born 18 September 1970 in Caracas) is a Venezuelan former cyclist.

== Career achievements ==
=== Major results ===
1992
1st Overall Clasico Ciclistico Banfoandes
1998
1st Stage 11 Vuelta al Táchira
2000
1st Stage 9 Vuelta al Táchira

=== Grand Tour general classification results timeline ===
Grand Tour	1995	1996	1997
Giro d'Italia	39	—	73
Tour de France	—	105	—
Vuelta a España	—	—	—

Legend
—	Did not compete
DNF	Did not finish
