= Jean-Luc Masdupuy =

French cyclist

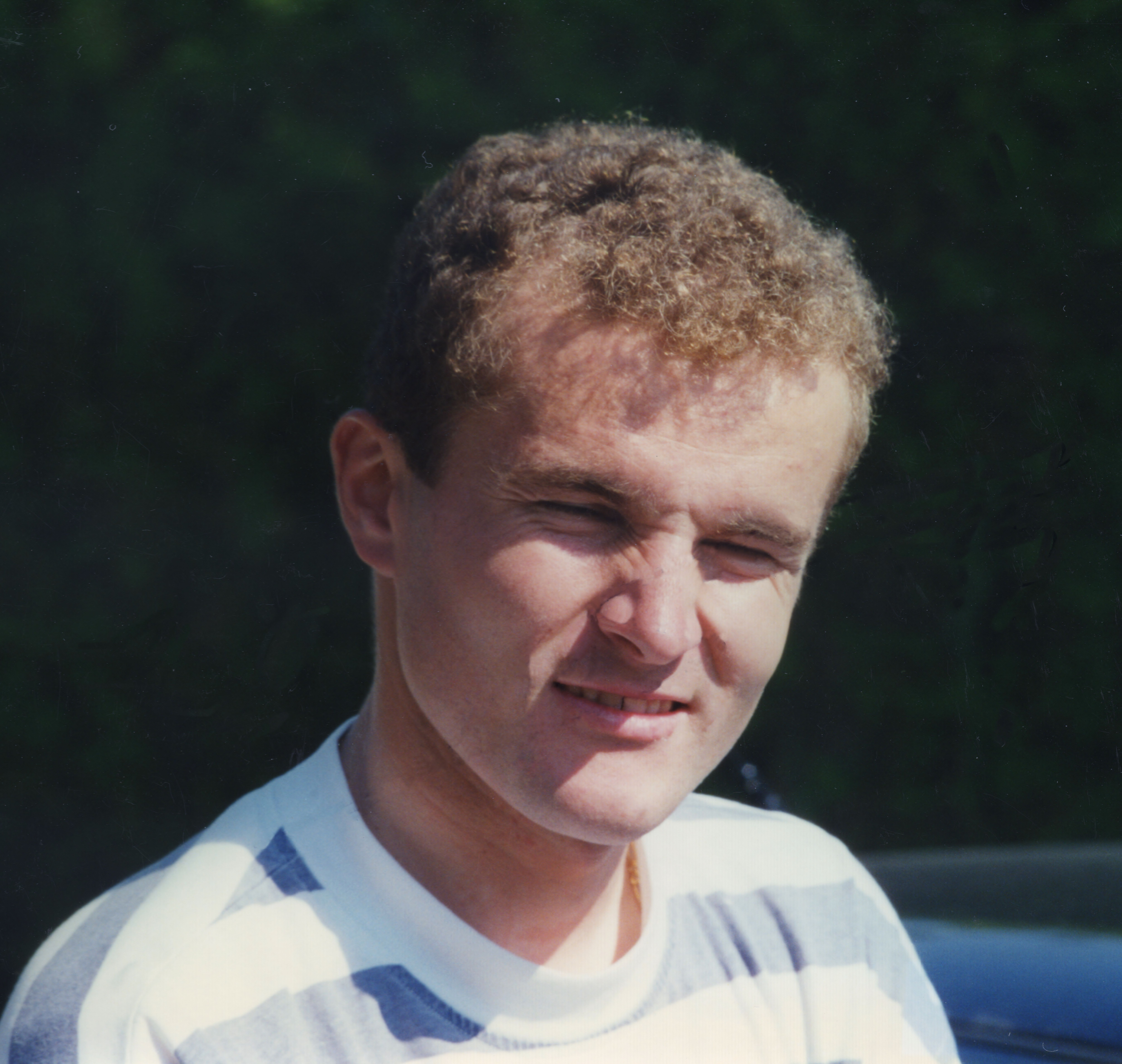
- Masdupuy in 1996

Personal information
- Full name: Jean-Luc Masdupuy
- Born: 14 April 1969 (age 57) Saint-Yrieix-la-Perche, France

Cycling career
- Sport: Cycling
- Discipline: Road
- Role: Rider

Amateur teams
- 1983–1990: AC Uzerche
- 1991: AC La Poste en Creuse
- 1991: ASPTT Guéret
- 1992: ASC Air
- 1993: AS Corbeil–Essonnes
- 2002–2004: VC Tulle
- 2005–2013: UC Felletin-en-Creuse
- 2014–2016: EC Felletin–Ussel Creuse–Corrèze
- 2017: UC Felletin-en-Creuse

Professional teams
- 1993: Festina–Lotus (stagiaire)
- 1994: Catavana–AS Corbeil–Essonnes–Cedico
- 1995: Aki–Gipiemme
- 1996: Agrigel–La Creuse–Fenioux
- 1996: Cédico–Ville de Charleroi

Jean-Luc Masdupuy (born 14 April 1969) is a French former racing cyclist. He finished in last place in the 1996 Tour de France.

== Major results ==
1993
1st Overall Tour de Corrèze

1st Stage 1

1st Overall Quatre Jours de l'Aisne

1st Stage 3

1st Grand Prix du Nord-Pas-de-Calais
1995
1st Stage 6 Circuit des Mines
1996
2nd Overall Tour de l'Ain

1st Stage 3

4th Overall Tour du Limousin
