= Hervé Garel =

French cyclist

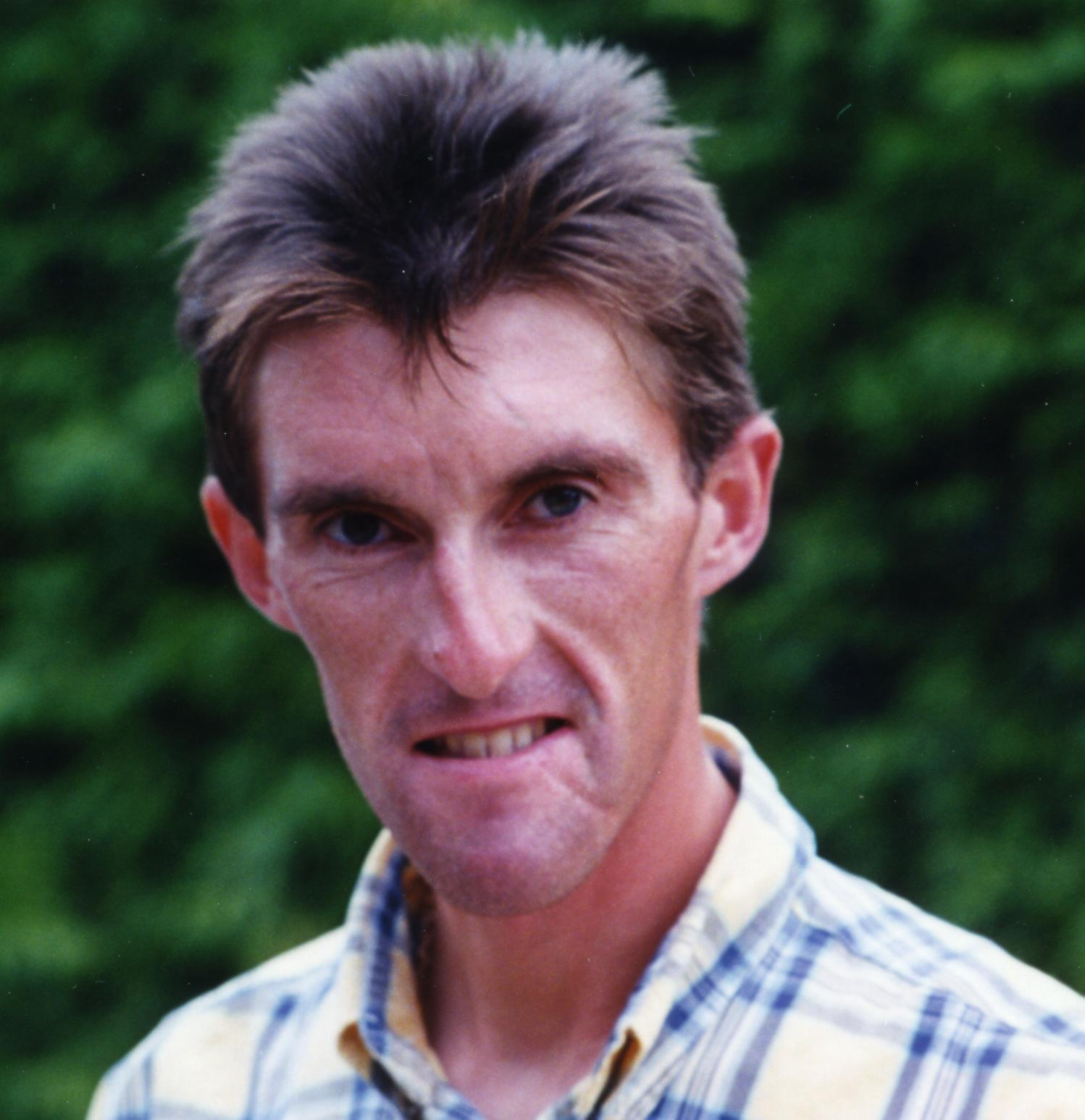

Personal information
- Born: 15 July 1967 (age 59) Rennes, France

Cycling career
- Sport: Cycling
- Current team: Retired
- Discipline: Road
- Role: Rider

Professional teams
- 1991–1992: RMO
- 1993–1994: GAN
- 1995: Le Groupement
- 1996: Agrigel–La Creuse

Major wins
- 1992 Tour de l'Avenir

Hervé Garel (born 15 July 1967 in Rennes) is a former French former professional road cyclist. He most notably won the Tour de l'Avenir in 1992.

== Major results ==
1990
1st Team time trial, National Road Championships
1st Tour d'Emeraude
1991
1st Team time trial, National Road Championships
1st Overall Tour d'Eure-et-Loir
1st Grand Prix de France (ITT)
1st Grand Prix des Nations Amateurs
1st Paris–Épernay
1st Créteil–Reims
1st Stages 3 & 4 Tour of Austria
1st Stage 5 Ruban Granitier Breton
3rd Chrono des Herbiers
1992
1st Overall Tour de l'Avenir

1st Stage 4

1993
5th Grand Prix d'Ouverture La Marseillaise
1994
5th Overall Tour du Limousin

=== Grand Tour results ===
| Grand Tour | 1993 |
|---|---|
| Giro d'Italia | DNF |
| Tour de France | — |
| Vuelta a España | — |

Legend
| — | Did not compete |
| DNF | Did not finish |
