= Dario Nicoletti =

Italian cyclist (born 1967)

Personal information
- Born: 7 March 1967 (age 59) Mariano Comense, Italy

Cycling career
- Sport: Cycling
- Current team: Retired
- Discipline: Road
- Role: Rider

Professional teams
- 1991–1992: Colnago–Lampre
- 1993–1996: Mapei–Viner
- 1997: MG Maglificio–Technogym

Dario Nicoletti (born 7 March 1967, in Mariano Comense) is an Italian former cyclist who was professional from 1991 to 1997.

== Major results ==
1990
1st GP Palio del Recioto
1st Piccolo Giro di Lombardia
1991
1st Giro di Campania
1997
1st Stage 2 Hofbrau Cup (TTT)

=== Grand Tour general classification results timeline ===
Grand Tour	1991	1992	1993	1994
Giro d'Italia	102	137	109	83
Tour de France	—	—	—	—
Vuelta a España	—	—	99	—

Legend
DSQ	Disqualified
DNF	Did not finish
