= René Foucachon =

French cyclist

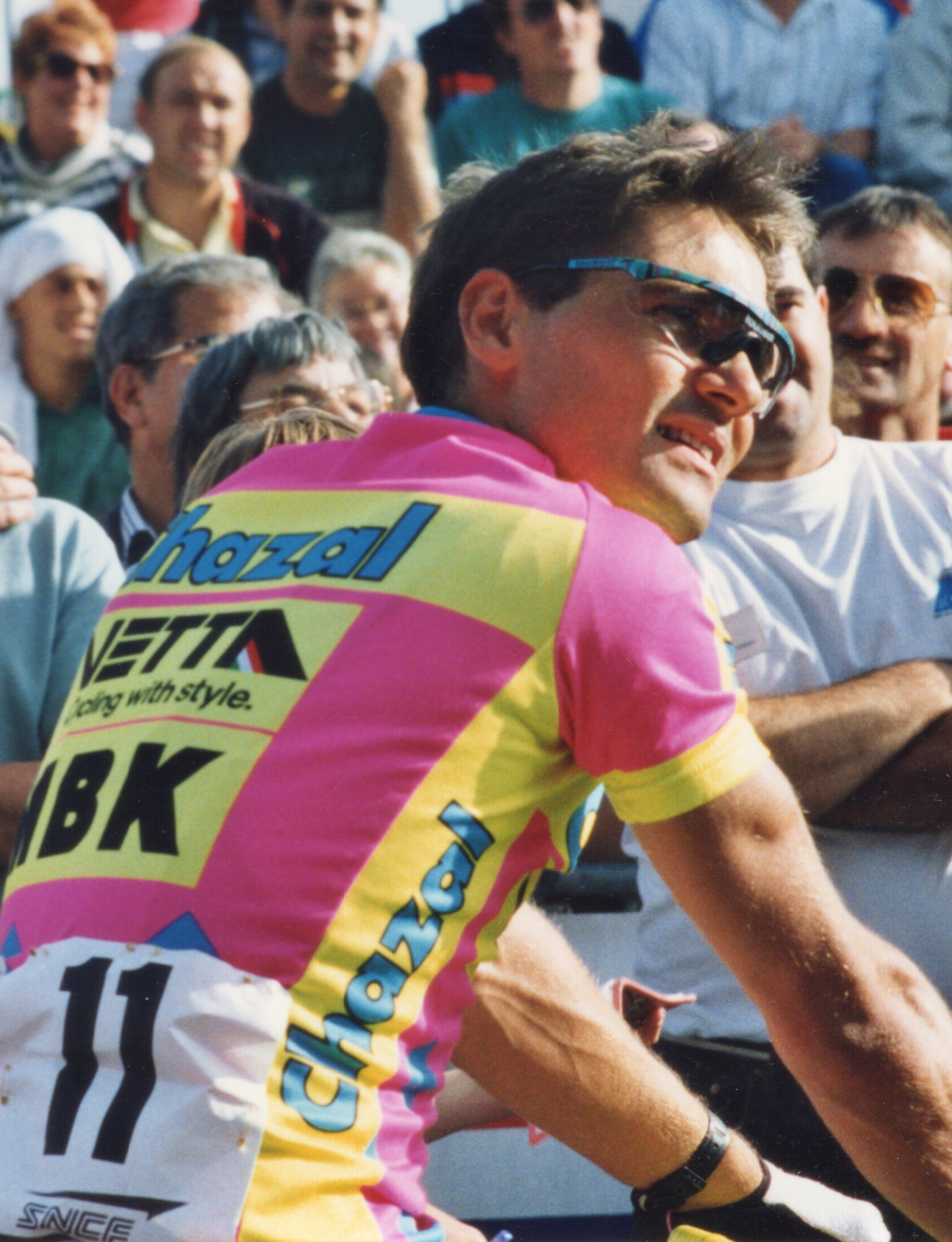
- Foucachon in 1993

Personal information
- Born: 6 January 1966 (age 60) Bezons, France

Cycling career
- Sport: Cycling
- Role: Rider

René Foucachon (born 6 January 1966) is a French former professional racing cyclist. He rode in the 1995 Tour de France.
