= Thierry Laurent =

French cyclist

Personal information
- Born: 13 September 1966 (age 60) Villefranche-sur-Saône, France

Cycling career
- Sport: Cycling
- Current team: Retired
- Discipline: Road
- Role: Rider

Professional teams
- 1989–1992: R.M.O.
- 1993–1994: Novemail–Histor–Laser Computer
- 1995: Castorama
- 1996: Agrigel–La Creuse
- 1997–1998: Festina–Lotus
- 1999: Lotto–Mobistar

Thierry Laurent (born 13 September 1966) is a retired French cyclist. He competed in the team time trial at the 1988 Summer Olympics.

== Major results ==
1987
2nd Essor Breton
1988
1st Tour de la Manche
1989
1st Circuit de la Sarthe

1st stage 1

1st stage 1 Grand Prix du Midi Libre
1st stage 5 Tour de l'Avenir
1990
1st stage 4 Tour de Bretagne
1991
1st stage 2A Route du Sud
3rd Grand Prix de Denain
4th Amstel Gold Race
1992
1st stage 5 Étoile de Bessèges
1st stage 3 Tour du Limousin
1993
3rd Grand Prix de Plouay
1995
3rd Grand Prix du Midi Libre
10th Critérium du Dauphiné
1996
1st stage 6 Tour de l'Ain
2nd Four Days of Dunkirk

1st stage 4

2nd Châteauroux Classic
