= Jean-Pierre Bourgeot =

French cyclist

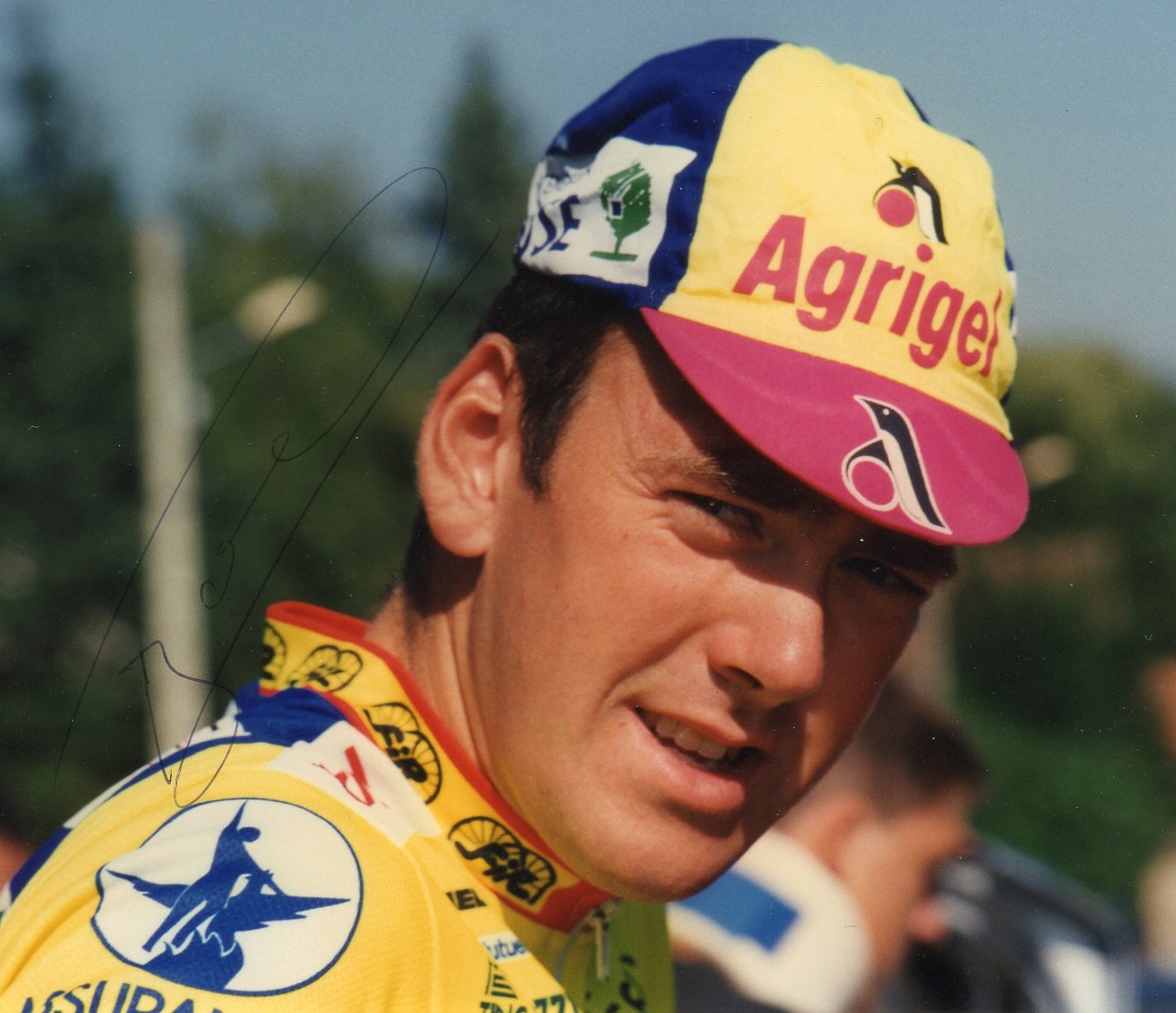

Personal information
- Born: 25 November 1968 (age 57) Moulins, Allier, France

Cycling career
- Sport: Cycling
- Discipline: Road
- Role: Rider

Professional teams
- 1992: Z
- 1993–1995: Chazal–Vetta–MBK
- 1996: Agrigel–La Creuse–Fenioux

Jean-Pierre Bourgeot (born 25 November 1968 in Moulins, Allier) is a French former cyclist. He participated in four editions of the Tour de France and one Vuelta a España.

== Major results ==
1991
1st Stage 1 Tour de Gironde
1992
1st Grand Prix Cristal Energie
2nd Circuit de Lorraine
8th Overall Peace Race
1993
4th Overall Circuit Cycliste Sarthe
1997
1st Road race, Auvergne Road Championships
