= Laurent Genty =

French cyclist (born 1971)

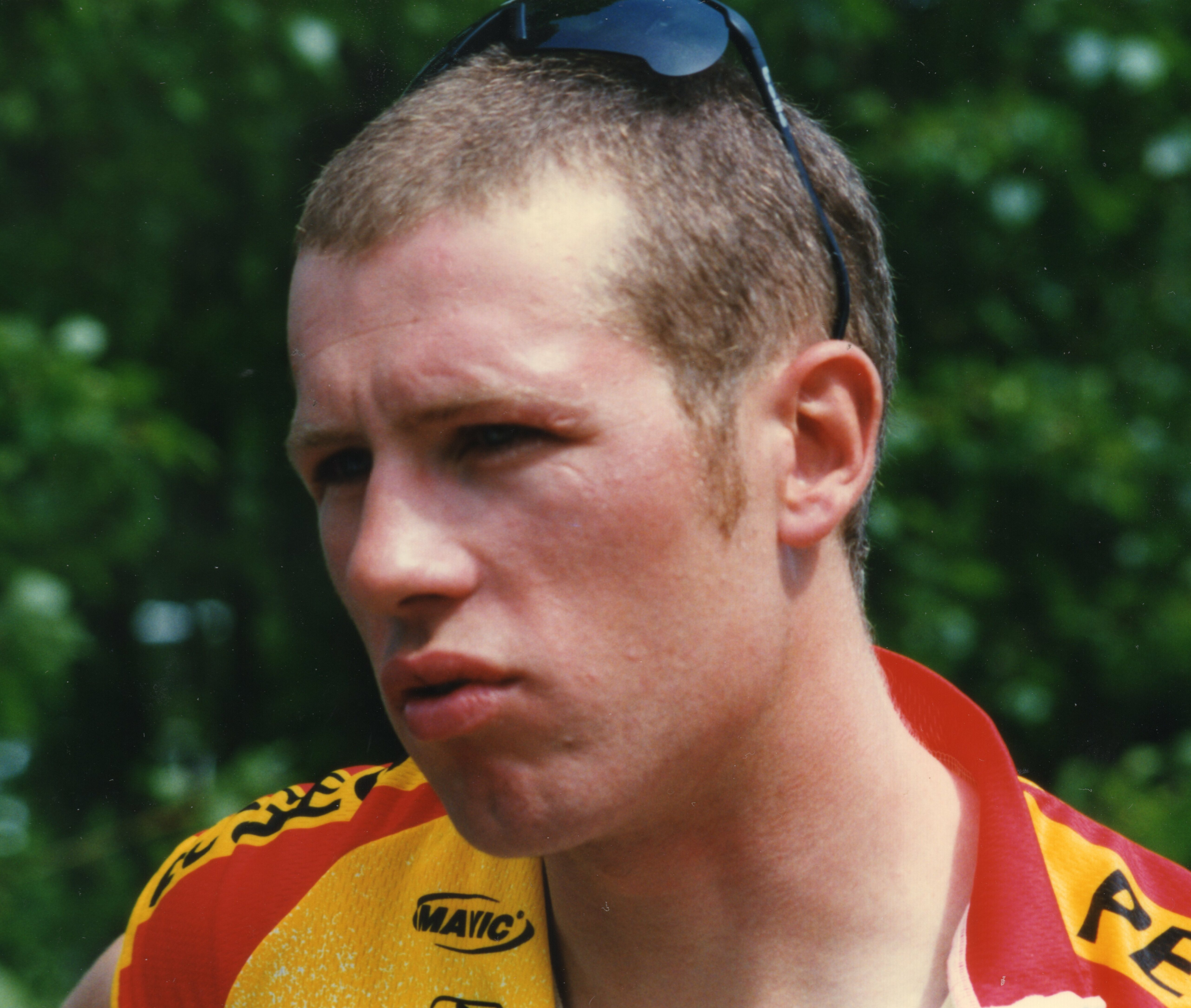

Personal information
- Born: 3 March 1971 (age 55)

Cycling career
- Sport: Cycling
- Role: Rider

Laurent Genty (born 3 March 1971) is a French racing cyclist. He rode in the 1996 Tour de France.
