= Marcello Siboni =

Italian cyclist

Personal information
- Born: 6 January 1965 (age 61) Cesena, Italy

Cycling career
- Sport: Cycling
- Discipline: Road
- Role: Rider

Professional teams
- 1987–1990: Ariostea–Gres
- 1991–1993: Jolly Componibili–Club 88
- 1995–1996: Carrera Jeans–Tassoni
- 1997–2002: Mercatone Uno

Marcello Siboni (born 6 January 1965) is an Italian former racing cyclist. He rode in five editions of the Tour de France and seven editions of the Giro d'Italia.

== Major results ==
1986
1st GP Capodarco
1987
5th Trofeo Matteotti
10th GP Industria & Artigianato
1988
10th Trofeo Pantalica
1989
7th Giro di Lombardia
1990
4th Gran Premio Città di Camaiore
1997
8th À travers Lausanne
1999
3rd Giro dell'Emilia
6th Criterium d'Abruzzo
8th Giro del Lazio
8th Gran Premio Bruno Beghelli
9th Giro del Veneto
9th GP Llodio
2000
8th Gran Premio Città di Camaiore

=== Grand Tour general classification results timeline ===
Grand Tour	1988	1989	1990	1991	1992	1993	1994	1995	1996	1997	1998	1999	2000	2001
Vuelta a España	—	—	—	—	—	—	—	—	—	—	—	—	—	—
Giro d'Italia	39	—	—	—	52	—	—	57	—	26	43	—	—	84
Tour de France	—	—	75	—	—	—	—	84	65	41	—	—	46	—
