= Prudencio Induráin =

Spanish cyclist

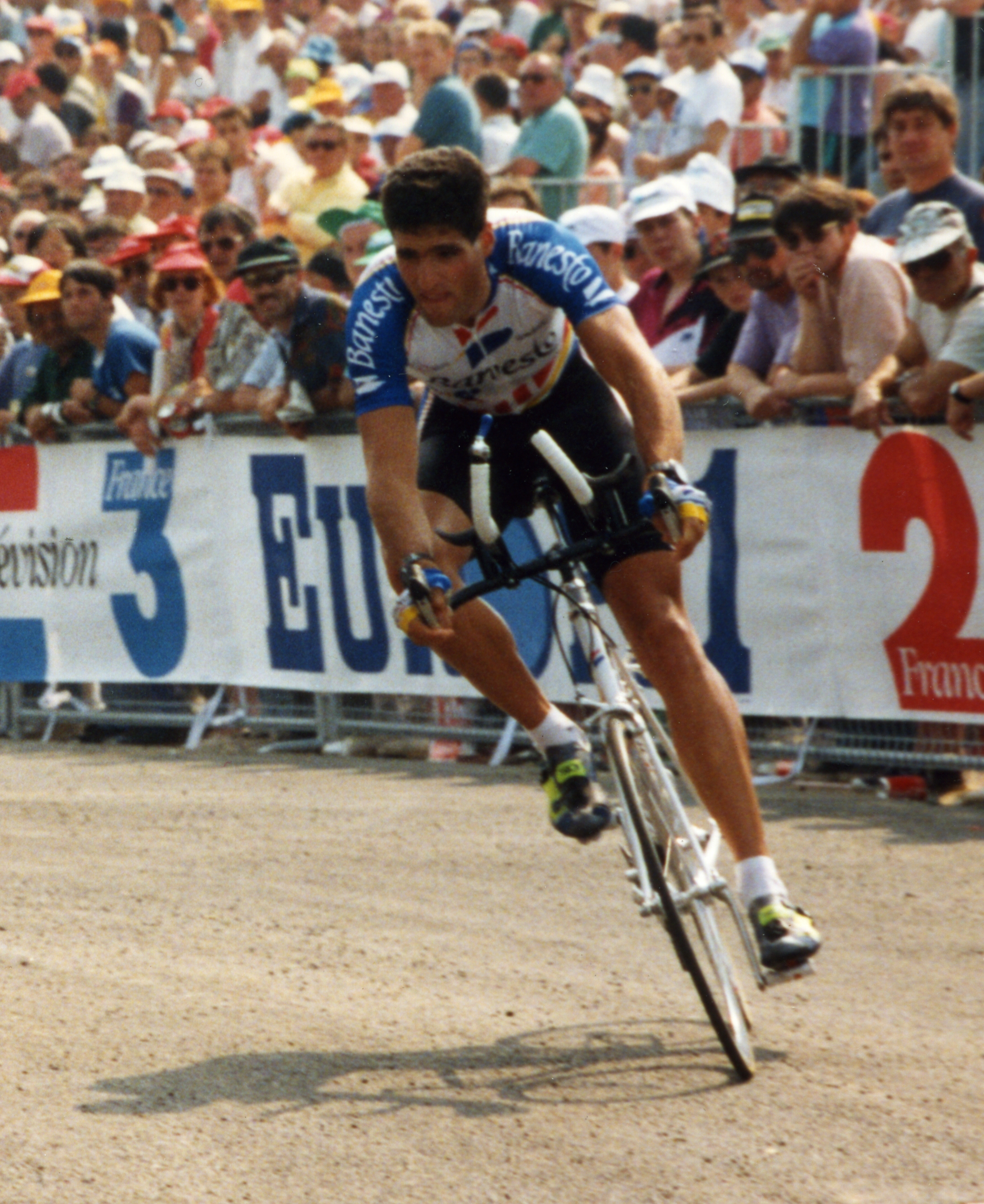

Personal information
- Full name: Prudencio Induráin Larraya
- Born: 9 June 1968 (age 58) Villava, Pamplona, Spain
- Height: 1.88 m (6 ft 2 in)
- Weight: 78 kg (172 lb; 12 st 4 lb)

Cycling career
- Sport: Cycling
- Discipline: Domestique
- Role: Rider

Professional teams
- 1991–1997: Banesto
- 1998–1999: Vitalicio Seguros

Prudencio Induráin Larraya (born 9 June 1968) is a Spanish retired road racing cyclist. He competed in four editions of the Tour de France. He is the brother of another retired professional cyclist, Miguel Induráin.

In 2011 he entered politics as a candidate for the Navarrese People's Union in the 2011 parliamentary election.

== Major results ==
1993
3rd Grand Prix of Aargau Canton
1994
5th Overall Circuit Cycliste Sarthe
1996
2nd Overall Volta ao Alentejo

1st Stages 1a, 2a & 5

3rd GP Villafranca de Ordizia

=== General classification results timeline ===
Grand Tour general classification results
| Grand Tour | 1992 | 1993 | 1994 | 1995 | 1996 | 1997 | 1998 | 1999 |
| Giro d'Italia | 132 | 63 | 50 | 97 | — | — | — | 45 |
| Tour de France | — | 126 | — | — | 58 | — | DNF | 76 |
| Vuelta a España | — | — | — | — | — | 44 | DNF | — |

Legend
| — | Did not compete |
| DNF | Did not finish |
