= José Ángel Vidal =

Spanish cyclist

Personal information
- Full name: José Ángel Vidal Martínez
- Born: 28 October 1969 (age 56) Padrón, Spain
- Height: 1.72 m (5 ft 7 1/2 in)
- Weight: 71 kg (157 lb; 11 st 3 lb)

Cycling career
- Sport: Cycling
- Current team: Retired
- Discipline: Road
- Role: Rider

Professional teams
- 1992: CHCS-Ciemar
- 1993-2004: Kelme

José Ángel Vidal Martínez (born 28 October 1969 in Padrón) is a former Spanish cyclist. He rode in 16 Grand Tours.

== Major results ==
1991
2nd Volta da Ascension
