= Dante Rezze =

French cyclist

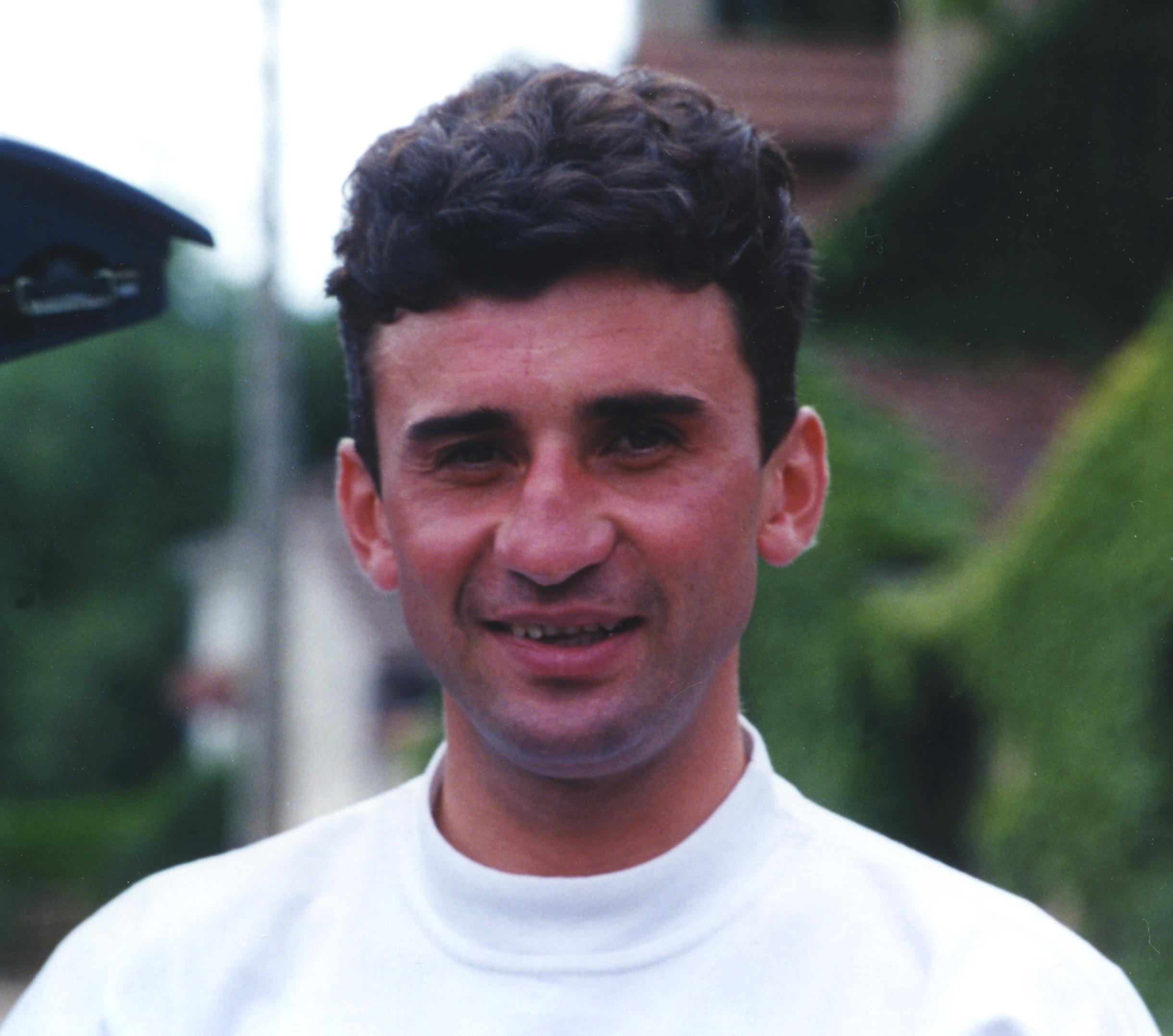
- Dante Rezze

Personal information
- Born: 27 April 1963 (age 63) Lyon, France

Cycling career
- Sport: Cycling
- Discipline: Road
- Role: Rider

Professional teams
- 1986–1992: RMO–Cycles Méral–Mavic
- 1993: Castorama
- 1994–1996: Jolly Componibili–Cage

Dante Rezze (born 27 April 1963) is a French former professional racing cyclist. He rode in three editions of the Tour de France and two editions of the Giro d'Italia.

During the 1995 Tour de France, he was one of five riders involved in the crash that killed Fabio Casartelli. Crashing into a ravine, Rezze suffered bruises and abandoned the Tour.

== Major results ==
1986
1st Prologue Tour de Luxembourg
1987
6th Bordeaux–Paris
1990
2nd Giro del Piemonte
1991
7th Giro di Lombardia
1992
3rd Classique des Alpes
3rd GP du canton d'Argovie
1993
10th Overall Etoile de Bessèges
