= Carmelo Miranda =

Spanish cyclist (born 1969)

Personal information
- Born: 20 December 1969 (age 56) Aranda de Duero, Spain

Cycling career
- Sport: Cycling
- Role: Rider

Carmelo Miranda (born 20 December 1969) is a Spanish former professional racing cyclist. He rode in two editions of the Tour de France.
