= Mario Chiesa (cyclist) =

Italian cyclist

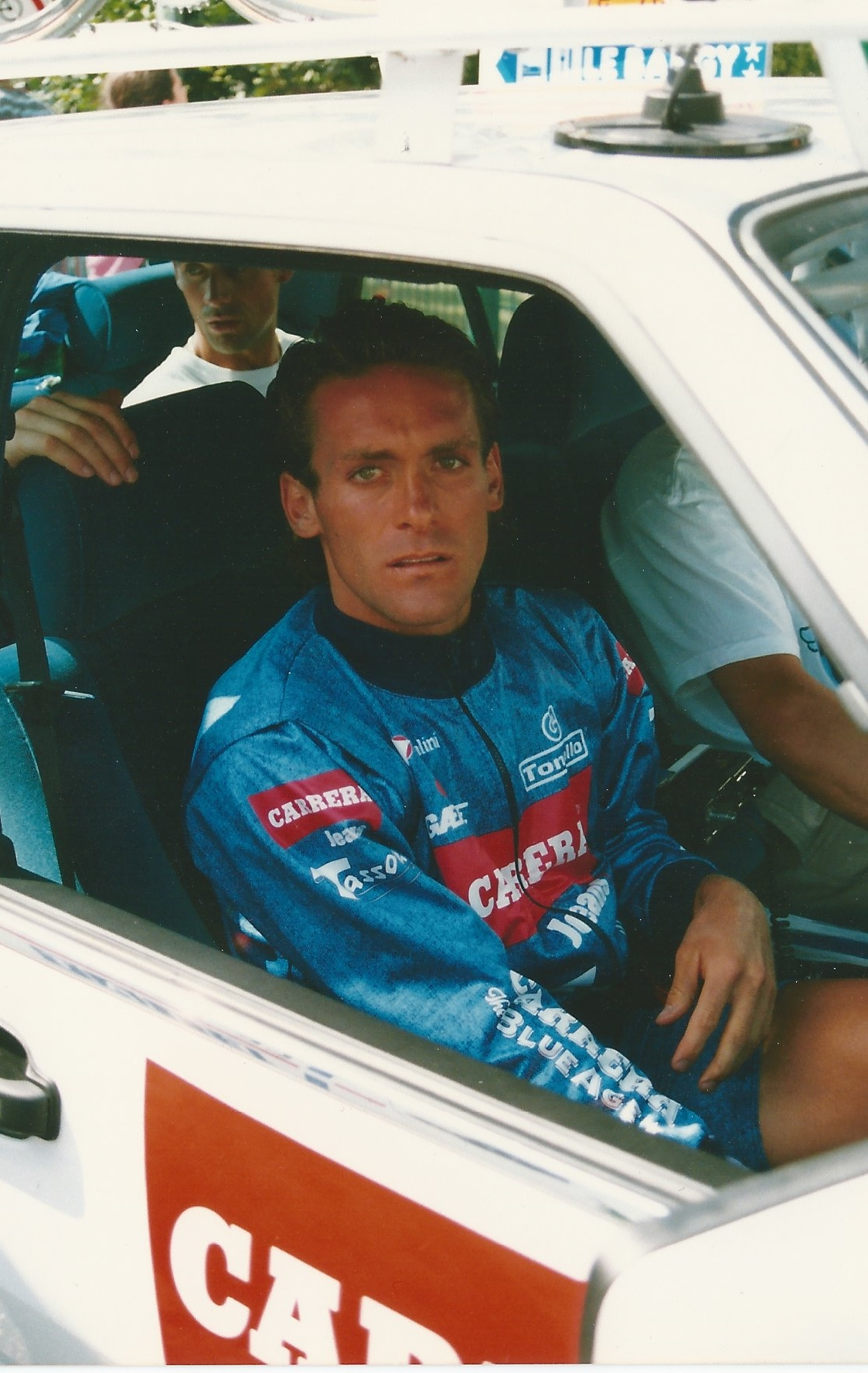
- Chiesa in 1992

Personal information
- Full name: Mario Chiesa
- Born: 17 November 1966 (age 59) Brescia, Italy

Cycling career
- Sport: Cycling
- Current team: Sias–Rime
- Discipline: Road
- Role: Rider (retired); Directeur sportif

Professional teams
- 1989–1996: Carrera Jeans–Vagabond
- 1997: Asics–CGA

Managerial teams
- 2001–2002: Fassa Bortolo
- 2003–2004: Tenax
- 2005: Fassa Bortolo
- 2006–2009: Liquigas
- 2010–2013: Team Katusha
- 2014–2016: IAM Cycling
- 2017: Bahrain–Merida
- 2019: IAM–Excelsior
- 2020–: Iseo Serrature–Rime–Carnovali

Mario Chiesa (Italian pronunciation: [ˈmaːrjo ˈkjɛːza]; born 17 November 1966) is an Italian former professional racing cyclist. He rode in five editions of the Tour de France, six editions of the Giro d'Italia and four editions of the Vuelta a España. He currently works as a directeur sportif for UCI Continental team Sias–Rime.

== Major results ==
1987
1st Stage 6 Giro della Valle d'Aosta
1990
1st Trofeo Matteotti
1994
3rd Giro del Friuli

=== Grand Tour general classification results timeline ===
Grand Tour	1988	1989	1990	1991	1992	1993	1994	1995	1996	1997
Giro d'Italia	—	DNF	137	—	—	64	59	81	—	82
Tour de France	—	—	—	—	117	92	114	DNF	125	—
Vuelta a España	82	—	—	DNF	118	—	—	112	—	—

Legend
—	Did not compete
DNF	Did not finish
