= 1992 Tour de France, Prologue to Stage 10 =

Cycling race stages

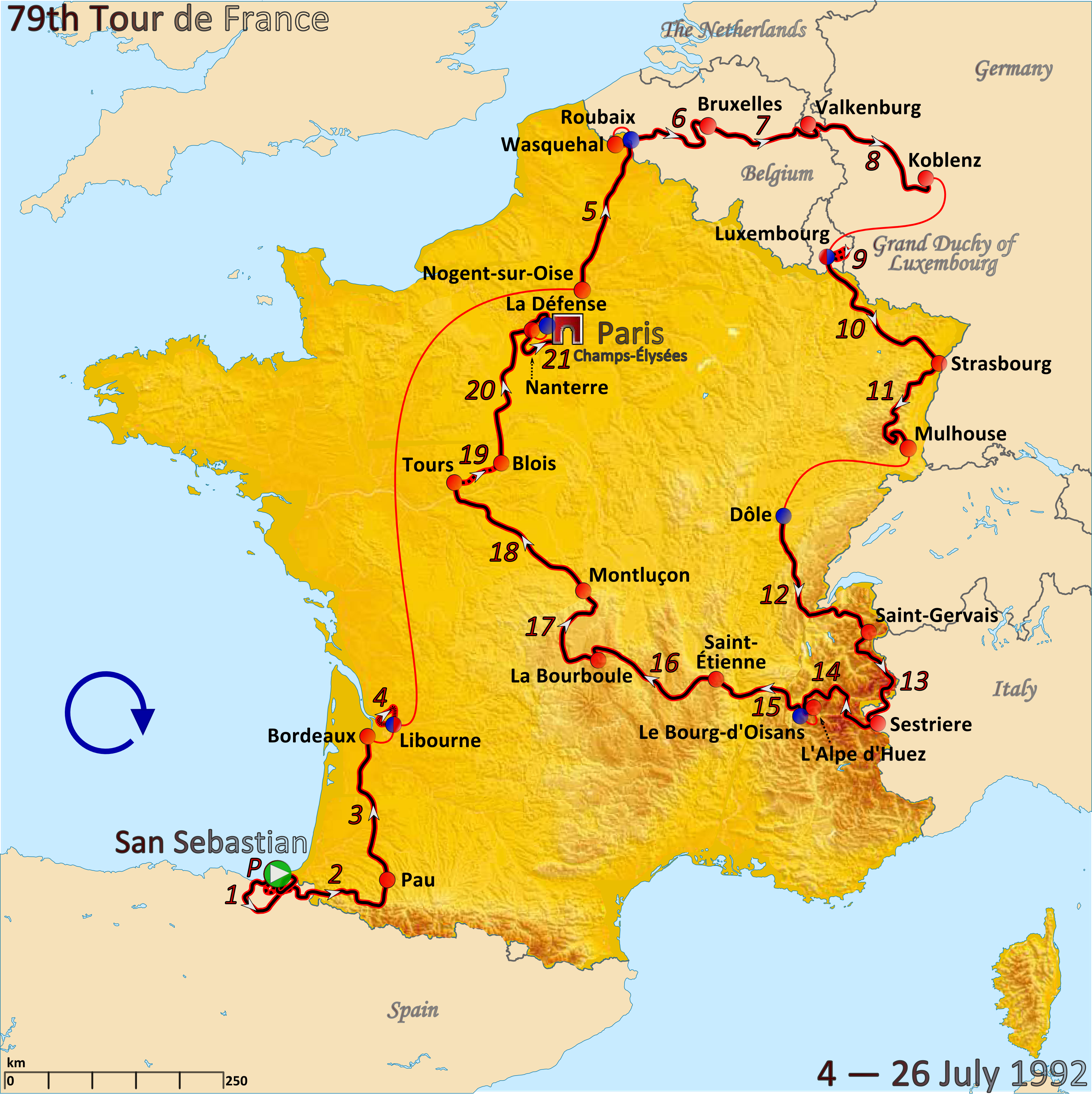
Route of the 1992 Tour de France

The 1992 Tour de France was the 79th edition of Tour de France, one of cycling's Grand Tours. The Tour began in San Sebastián in Spain with a prologue individual time trial on 4 July, and Stage 10 occurred on 14 July with a flat stage to Strasbourg. The race finished on the Champs-Élysées in Paris on 26 July.

== Prologue ==
4 July 1992 — San Sebastián (Spain), 8 km (5.0 mi) (ITT)

Prologue result and general classification after prologue

Rank	Rider	Team	Time
1	Miguel Indurain (ESP)	Banesto	9' 22"
2	Alex Zülle (SUI)	ONCE	+ 2"
3	Thierry Marie (FRA)	Castorama	+ 3"
4	Jelle Nijdam (NED)	Buckler–Colnago–Decca	+ 4"
5	Armand de Las Cuevas (FRA)	Banesto	+ 11"
6	Aitor Garmendia (ESP)	Banesto	+ 12"
7	Raúl Alcalá (MEX)	PDM–Ultima–Concorde	s.t.
8	Gianni Bugno (ITA)	Gatorade–Chateau d'Ax	s.t.
9	Edwig Van Hooydonck (BEL)	Buckler–Colnago–Decca	s.t.
10	Viatcheslav Ekimov (RUS)	Panasonic–Sportlife	+ 13"

== Stage 1 ==
5 July 1992 — San Sebastián (Spain), 194.5 km (120.9 mi)

Stage 1 result

Rank	Rider	Team	Time
1	Dominique Arnould (FRA)	Castorama	4h 37' 39"
2	Johan Museeuw (BEL)	Lotto–Mavic–MBK	s.t.
3	Max Sciandri (ITA)	Motorola	s.t.
4	Jesper Skibby (DEN)	TVM–Sanyo	s.t.
5	Harald Maier (AUT)	PDM–Ultima–Concorde	s.t.
6	Richard Virenque (FRA)	RMO	s.t.
7	Rolf Gölz (GER)	Ariostea	s.t.
8	Marc Sergeant (BEL)	Panasonic–Sportlife	s.t.
9	Sean Kelly (IRL)	Lotus–Festina	s.t.
10	Jens Heppner (GER)	Team Telekom	s.t.

General classification after stage 1

Rank	Rider	Team	Time
1	Alex Zülle (SUI)	ONCE	4h 46' 57"
2	Dominique Arnould (FRA)	Castorama	+ 2"
3	Miguel Indurain (ESP)	Banesto	+ 4"
4	Armand de Las Cuevas (FRA)	Banesto	+ 15"
5	Raúl Alcalá (MEX)	PDM–Ultima–Concorde	+ 16"
6	Gianni Bugno (ITA)	Gatorade–Chateau d'Ax	s.t.
7	Viatcheslav Ekimov (RUS)	Panasonic–Sportlife	+ 17"
8	Erik Breukink (NED)	PDM–Ultima–Concorde	+ 18"
9	Pascal Lino (FRA)	RMO	s.t.
10	Greg LeMond (USA)	Z	s.t.

== Stage 2 ==
6 July 1992 — San Sebastián (Spain) to Pau, 255 km (158.4 mi)

Stage 2 result

Rank	Rider	Team	Time
1	Javier Murguialday (ESP)	Amaya Seguros	6h 41' 56"
2	Richard Virenque (FRA)	RMO	+ 3"
3	Gianni Bugno (ITA)	Gatorade–Chateau d'Ax	+ 5' 05"
4	Claudio Chiappucci (ITA)	Carrera Jeans–Vagabond	s.t.
5	Charly Mottet (FRA)	RMO	s.t.
6	Miguel Indurain (ESP)	Banesto	s.t.
7	Dante Rezze (FRA)	RMO	s.t.
8	Maurizio Fondriest (ITA)	Panasonic–Sportlife	+ 5' 21"
9	Steve Bauer (CAN)	Motorola	s.t.
10	Jesper Skibby (DEN)	TVM–Sanyo	s.t.

General classification after stage 2

Rank	Rider	Team	Time
1	Richard Virenque (FRA)	RMO	11h 29' 28"
2	Miguel Indurain (ESP)	Banesto	+ 4' 34"
3	Gianni Bugno (ITA)	Gatorade–Chateau d'Ax	+ 4' 36"
4	Dominique Arnould (FRA)	Castorama	+ 4' 50"
5	Raúl Alcalá (MEX)	PDM–Ultima–Concorde	+ 5' 04"
6	Claudio Chiappucci (ITA)	Carrera Jeans–Vagabond	s.t.
7	Charly Mottet (FRA)	RMO	+ 5' 05"
8	Erik Breukink (NED)	PDM–Ultima–Concorde	+ 5' 06"
9	Pascal Lino (FRA)	RMO	s.t.
10	Greg LeMond (USA)	Z	s.t.

== Stage 3 ==
7 July 1992 — Pau to Bordeaux, 210 km (130 mi)

Stage 3 result

Rank	Rider	Team	Time
1	Rob Harmeling (NED)	TVM–Sanyo	5h 45' 17"
2	Sammie Moreels (BEL)	Lotto–Mavic–MBK	s.t.
3	Massimo Ghirotto (ITA)	Carrera Jeans–Vagabond	s.t.
4	Pascal Lino (FRA)	RMO	s.t.
5	Jérôme Simon (FRA)	Z	s.t.
6	Martin Kokkelkoren (NED)	Buckler–Colnago–Decca	s.t.
7	Eric Van Lancker (BEL)	Panasonic–Sportlife	s.t.
8	Noël Segers (BEL)	Buckler–Colnago–Decca	s.t.
9	Allan Peiper (AUS)	Tulip	+ 5"
10	Gerrit de Vries (NED)	Buckler–Colnago–Decca	+ 21"

General classification after stage 3

Rank	Rider	Team	Time
1	Pascal Lino (FRA)	RMO	17h 19' 51"
2	Richard Virenque (FRA)	RMO	+ 1' 54"
3	Miguel Indurain (ESP)	Banesto	+ 6' 28"
4	Gianni Bugno (ITA)	Gatorade–Chateau d'Ax	+ 6' 30"
5	Dominique Arnould (FRA)	Castorama	+ 6' 44"
6	Raúl Alcalá (MEX)	PDM–Ultima–Concorde	+ 6' 58"
7	Claudio Chiappucci (ITA)	Carrera Jeans–Vagabond	s.t.
8	Charly Mottet (FRA)	RMO	+ 6' 59"
9	Erik Breukink (NED)	PDM–Ultima–Concorde	+ 7' 00"
10	Greg LeMond (USA)	Z	s.t.

== Stage 4 ==
8 July 1992 — Libourne, 63.5 km (39.5 mi) (TTT)

Stage 4 result

Rank	Team	Time
1	Panasonic–Sportlife	1h 13' 15"
2	Carrera Jeans–Vagabond	+ 7"
3	Gatorade–Chateau d'Ax	+ 21"
4	Z	+ 40"
5	ONCE	+ 47"
6	Motorola	+ 48"
7	Banesto	+ 50"
8	GB–MG Maglificio	+ 59"
9	TVM–Sanyo	+ 1' 06"
10	PDM–Ultima–Concorde	+ 1' 14"

General classification after stage 4

Rank	Rider	Team	Time
1	Pascal Lino (FRA)	RMO	18h 34' 51"
2	Richard Virenque (FRA)	RMO	+ 1' 54"
3	Gianni Bugno (ITA)	Gatorade–Chateau d'Ax	+ 5' 06"
4	Claudio Chiappucci (ITA)	Carrera Jeans–Vagabond	+ 5' 20"
5	Stephen Roche (IRL)	Carrera Jeans–Vagabond	+ 5' 28"
6	Miguel Indurain (ESP)	Banesto	+ 5' 33"
7	Giancarlo Perini (ITA)	Carrera Jeans–Vagabond	+ 5' 35"
8	Eddy Bouwmans (NED)	Panasonic–Sportlife	+ 5' 40"
9	Dimitri Zhdanov (RUS)	Panasonic–Sportlife	+ 5' 42"
10	Laurent Fignon (FRA)	Gatorade–Chateau d'Ax	+ 5' 49"

== Stage 5 ==
9 July 1992 — Nogent-sur-Oise to Wasquehal, 196 km (122 mi)

Stage 5 result

Rank	Rider	Team	Time
1	Guido Bontempi (ITA)	Carrera Jeans–Vagabond	4h 06' 01"
2	Dimitri Konyshev (RUS)	TVM–Sanyo	+ 30"
3	Olaf Ludwig (GER)	Panasonic–Sportlife	+ 36"
4	Laurent Jalabert (FRA)	ONCE	s.t.
5	Bruno Cenghialta (ITA)	Ariostea	s.t.
6	Jim Van De Laer (BEL)	Tulip	s.t.
7	Frans Maassen (NED)	Buckler–Colnago–Decca	s.t.
8	Steve Bauer (CAN)	Motorola	+ 38"
9	Óscar de Jesús Vargas (COL)	Amaya Seguros	+ 39"
10	Jens Heppner (GER)	Team Telekom	s.t.

General classification after stage 5

Rank	Rider	Team	Time
1	Pascal Lino (FRA)	RMO	22h 44' 25"
2	Richard Virenque (FRA)	RMO	+ 1' 54"
3	Steve Bauer (CAN)	Motorola	+ 3' 11"
4	Jens Heppner (GER)	Team Telekom	+ 4' 37"
5	Gianni Bugno (ITA)	Gatorade–Chateau d'Ax	+ 5' 06"
6	Claudio Chiappucci (ITA)	Carrera Jeans–Vagabond	+ 5' 20"
7	Stephen Roche (IRL)	Carrera Jeans–Vagabond	+ 5' 28"
8	Dimitri Zhdanov (RUS)	Panasonic–Sportlife	+ 5' 31"
9	Miguel Indurain (ESP)	Banesto	+ 5' 33"
10	Giancarlo Perini (ITA)	Carrera Jeans–Vagabond	+ 5' 35"

== Stage 6 ==
10 July 1992 — Roubaix to Brussels (Belgium), 167 km (104 mi)

Stage 6 result

Rank	Rider	Team	Time
1	Laurent Jalabert (FRA)	ONCE	3h 37' 06"
2	Claudio Chiappucci (ITA)	Carrera Jeans–Vagabond	s.t.
3	Brian Holm (DEN)	Tulip	s.t.
4	Greg LeMond (USA)	Z	s.t.
5	Johan Museeuw (BEL)	Lotto–Mavic–MBK	+ 1' 22"
6	Wilfried Nelissen (BEL)	Panasonic–Sportlife	s.t.
7	Olaf Ludwig (GER)	Panasonic–Sportlife	s.t.
8	Dimitri Konyshev (RUS)	TVM–Sanyo	s.t.
9	Johan Capiot (BEL)	TVM–Sanyo	s.t.
10	Jelle Nijdam (NED)	Buckler–Colnago–Decca	s.t.

General classification after stage 6

Rank	Rider	Team	Time
1	Pascal Lino (FRA)	RMO	26h 22' 53"
2	Steve Bauer (CAN)	Motorola	+ 3' 11"
3	Claudio Chiappucci (ITA)	Carrera Jeans–Vagabond	+ 3' 34"
4	Richard Virenque (FRA)	RMO	+ 4' 02"
5	Greg LeMond (USA)	Z	+ 4' 29"
6	Jens Heppner (GER)	Team Telekom	+ 4' 37"
7	Gianni Bugno (ITA)	Gatorade–Chateau d'Ax	+ 5' 06"
8	Stephen Roche (IRL)	Carrera Jeans–Vagabond	+ 5' 28"
9	Miguel Indurain (ESP)	Banesto	+ 5' 33"
10	Giancarlo Perini (ITA)	Carrera Jeans–Vagabond	+ 5' 35"

== Stage 7 ==
11 July 1992 — Brussels (Belgium) to Valkenburg (Netherlands), 196.5 km (122.1 mi)

Stage 7 result

Rank	Rider	Team	Time
1	Gilles Delion (FRA)	Helvetia–Commodore	4h 21' 47"
2	Stephen Roche (IRL)	Carrera Jeans–Vagabond	s.t.
3	Rolf Järmann (SUI)	Ariostea	+ 4"
4	Valerio Tebaldi (ITA)	Gatorade–Chateau d'Ax	+ 8"
5	Massimo Ghirotto (ITA)	Carrera Jeans–Vagabond	+ 1' 00"
6	Dimitri Konyshev (RUS)	TVM–Sanyo	s.t.
7	Brian Holm (DEN)	Tulip	s.t.
8	Gert-Jan Theunisse (NED)	TVM–Sanyo	s.t.
9	Olaf Ludwig (GER)	Panasonic–Sportlife	s.t.
10	Laurent Jalabert (FRA)	ONCE	s.t.

General classification after stage 7

Rank	Rider	Team	Time
1	Pascal Lino (FRA)	RMO	30h 45' 45"
2	Steve Bauer (CAN)	Motorola	+ 3' 11"
3	Claudio Chiappucci (ITA)	Carrera Jeans–Vagabond	+ 3' 34"
4	Stephen Roche (IRL)	Carrera Jeans–Vagabond	+ 4' 11"
5	Richard Virenque (FRA)	RMO	+ 4' 15"
6	Greg LeMond (USA)	Z	+ 4' 29"
7	Jens Heppner (GER)	Team Telekom	+ 4' 37"
8	Valerio Tebaldi (ITA)	Gatorade–Chateau d'Ax	+ 4' 51"
9	Gianni Bugno (ITA)	Gatorade–Chateau d'Ax	+ 5' 06"
10	Miguel Indurain (ESP)	Banesto	+ 5' 33"

== Stage 8 ==
12 July 1992 — Valkenburg (Netherlands) to Koblenz (Germany), 206.5 km (128.3 mi)

Stage 8 result

Rank	Rider	Team	Time
1	Jan Nevens (BEL)	Lotto–Mavic–MBK	4h 45' 23"
2	Jesper Skibby (DEN)	TVM–Sanyo	+ 3"
3	Massimo Ghirotto (ITA)	Carrera Jeans–Vagabond	s.t.
4	Alberto Leanizbarrutia (ESP)	Clas-Cajastur	s.t.
5	Flavio Vanzella (ITA)	GB–MG Maglificio	+ 56"
6	Yvon Ledanois (FRA)	Castorama	s.t.
7	Alex Zülle (SUI)	ONCE	+ 2' 26"
8	Olaf Ludwig (GER)	Panasonic–Sportlife	+ 2' 30"
9	Frans Maassen (NED)	Buckler–Colnago–Decca	s.t.
10	Jens Heppner (GER)	Team Telekom	+ 2' 32"

General classification after stage 8

Rank	Rider	Team	Time
1	Pascal Lino (FRA)	RMO	35h 35' 26"
2	Jens Heppner (GER)	Team Telekom	+ 2' 51"
3	Jesper Skibby (DEN)	TVM–Sanyo	+ 2' 54"
4	Steve Bauer (CAN)	Motorola	+ 3' 11"
5	Yvon Ledanois (FRA)	Castorama	+ 3' 23"
6	Claudio Chiappucci (ITA)	Carrera Jeans–Vagabond	+ 3' 34"
7	Stephen Roche (IRL)	Carrera Jeans–Vagabond	+ 4' 11"
8	Richard Virenque (FRA)	RMO	+ 4' 15"
9	Alberto Leanizbarrutia (ESP)	Clas-Cajastur	+ 4' 24"
10	Greg LeMond (USA)	Z	+ 4' 29"

== Stage 9 ==
13 July 1992 — Luxembourg City (Luxembourg), 65 km (40 mi) (ITT)

Stage 9 result

Rank	Rider	Team	Time
1	Miguel Indurain (ESP)	Banesto	1h 19' 31"
2	Armand de Las Cuevas (FRA)	Banesto	+ 3' 00"
3	Gianni Bugno (ITA)	Gatorade–Chateau d'Ax	+ 3' 41"
4	Zenon Jaskuła (POL)	GB–MG Maglificio	+ 3' 47"
5	Greg LeMond (USA)	Z	+ 4' 04"
6	Pascal Lino (FRA)	RMO	+ 4' 06"
7	Stephen Roche (IRL)	Carrera Jeans–Vagabond	+ 4' 10"
8	Artūras Kasputis (LTU)	Ryalco-Postobón	+ 4' 26"
9	Alex Zülle (SUI)	ONCE	+ 4' 29"
10	Pedro Delgado (ESP)	Banesto	+ 4' 52"

General classification after stage 9

Rank	Rider	Team	Time
1	Pascal Lino (FRA)	RMO	36h 59' 03"
2	Miguel Indurain (ESP)	Banesto	+ 1' 27"
3	Jesper Skibby (DEN)	TVM–Sanyo	+ 3' 47"
4	Stephen Roche (IRL)	Carrera Jeans–Vagabond	+ 4' 15"
5	Greg LeMond (USA)	Z	+ 4' 27"
6	Gianni Bugno (ITA)	Gatorade–Chateau d'Ax	+ 4' 39"
7	Jens Heppner (GER)	Team Telekom	+ 4' 52"
8	Claudio Chiappucci (ITA)	Carrera Jeans–Vagabond	+ 4' 54"
9	Yvon Ledanois (FRA)	Castorama	+ 5' 52"
10	Alberto Leanizbarrutia (ESP)	Clas-Cajastur	+ 6' 15"

== Stage 10 ==
14 July 1992 — Luxembourg City (Luxembourg) to Strasbourg, 217 km (135 mi)

Stage 10 result

Rank	Rider	Team	Time
1	Jean-Paul van Poppel (NED)	PDM–Ultima–Concorde	5h 02' 45"
2	Djamolidine Abdoujaparov (UZB)	Carrera Jeans–Vagabond	s.t.
3	Laurent Jalabert (FRA)	ONCE	s.t.
4	Johan Museeuw (BEL)	Lotto–Mavic–MBK	s.t.
5	Olaf Ludwig (GER)	Panasonic–Sportlife	s.t.
6	Giovanni Fidanza (ITA)	Gatorade–Chateau d'Ax	s.t.
7	Adri van der Poel (NED)	Tulip	s.t.
8	Phil Anderson (AUS)	Motorola	s.t.
9	Eric Vanderaerden (BEL)	Buckler–Colnago–Decca	s.t.
10	Søren Lilholt (DEN)	Tulip	s.t.

General classification after stage 10

Rank	Rider	Team	Time
1	Pascal Lino (FRA)	RMO	42h 01' 48"
2	Miguel Indurain (ESP)	Banesto	+ 1' 27"
3	Jesper Skibby (DEN)	TVM–Sanyo	+ 3' 47"
4	Stephen Roche (IRL)	Carrera Jeans–Vagabond	+ 4' 15"
5	Greg LeMond (USA)	Z	+ 4' 27"
6	Gianni Bugno (ITA)	Gatorade–Chateau d'Ax	+ 4' 39"
7	Jens Heppner (GER)	Team Telekom	+ 4' 52"
8	Claudio Chiappucci (ITA)	Carrera Jeans–Vagabond	+ 4' 54"
9	Yvon Ledanois (FRA)	Castorama	+ 5' 52"
10	Alberto Leanizbarrutia (ESP)	Clas-Cajastur	+ 6' 15"
