= 1992 Tour de France, Stage 11 to Stage 21 =

Cycling race stages

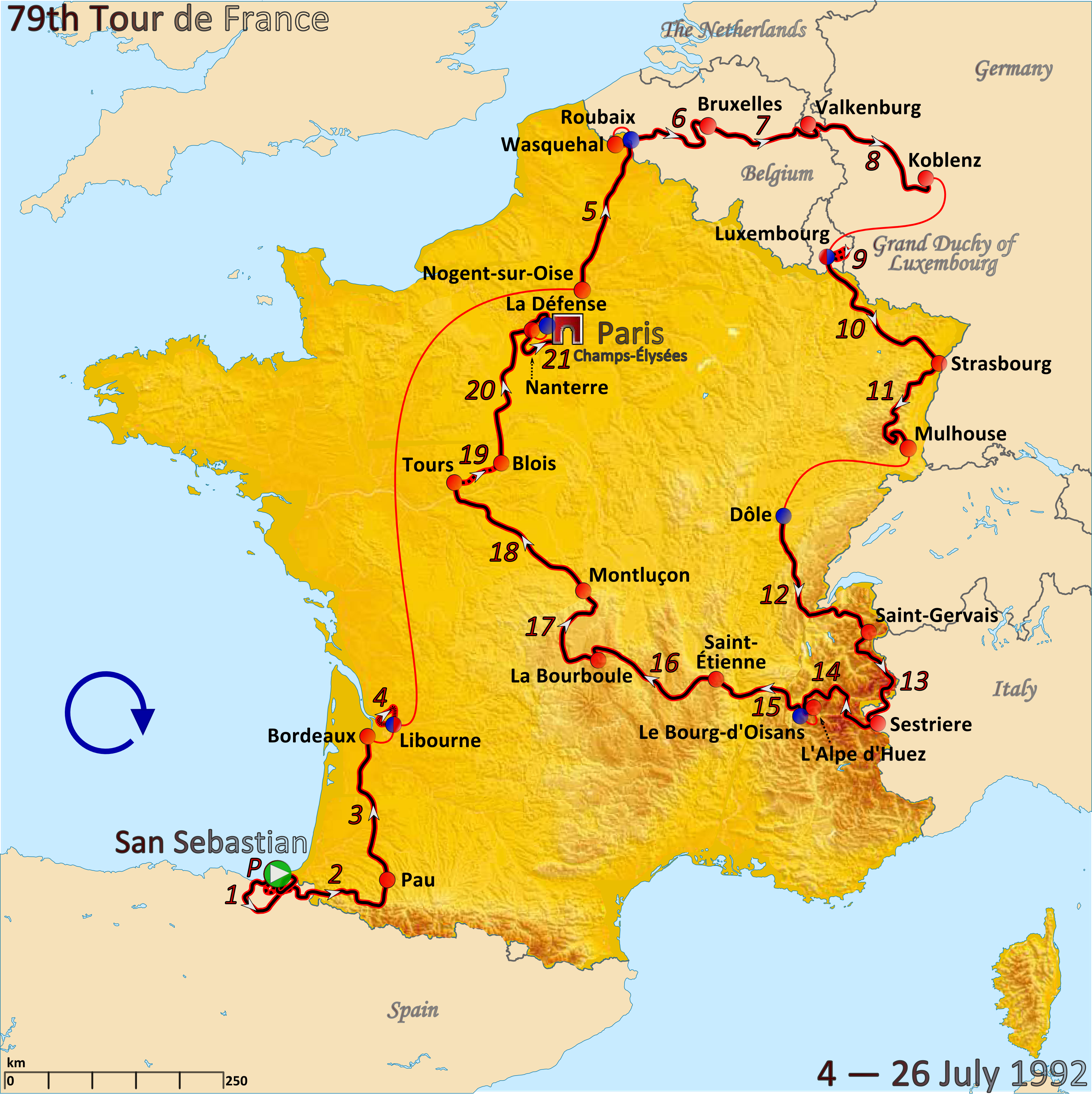
Route of the 1992 Tour de France

The 1992 Tour de France was the 79th edition of Tour de France, one of cycling's Grand Tours. The Tour began in San Sebastián in Spain with a prologue individual time trial on 4 July and Stage 11 occurred on 15 July with a hilly stage from Strasbourg. The race finished on the Champs-Élysées in Paris on 26 July.

== Stage 11 ==
15 July 1992 — Strasbourg to Mulhouse, 249.5 km (155.0 mi)

Stage 11 result

Rank	Rider	Team	Time
1	Laurent Fignon (FRA)	Gatorade–Chateau d'Ax	6h 30' 49"
2	Laurent Dufaux (SUI)	Helvetia-Commodore	+ 12"
3	Per Pedersen (DEN)	Amaya Seguros	s.t.
4	Alberto Elli (ITA)	Ariostea	s.t.
5	Dimitri Konyshev (RUS)	TVM–Sanyo	s.t.
6	Pedro Delgado (ESP)	Banesto	s.t.
7	Luc Leblanc (FRA)	Castorama	s.t.
8	Laurent Jalabert (FRA)	ONCE	+ 22"
9	Claudio Chiappucci (ITA)	Carrera Jeans–Vagabond	s.t.
10	Sean Kelly (IRL)	Lotus–Festina	s.t.

General classification after stage 11

Rank	Rider	Team	Time
1	Pascal Lino (FRA)	RMO	48h 32' 59"
2	Miguel Indurain (ESP)	Banesto	+ 1' 27"
3	Stephen Roche (IRL)	Carrera Jeans–Vagabond	+ 4' 15"
4	Greg LeMond (USA)	Z	+ 4' 27"
5	Gianni Bugno (ITA)	Gatorade–Chateau d'Ax	+ 4' 39"
6	Claudio Chiappucci (ITA)	Carrera Jeans–Vagabond	+ 4' 54"
7	Yvon Ledanois (FRA)	Castorama	+ 5' 52"
8	Giancarlo Perini (ITA)	Carrera Jeans–Vagabond	+ 6' 44"
9	Pedro Delgado (ESP)	Banesto	+ 7' 01"
10	Laurent Fignon (FRA)	Gatorade–Chateau d'Ax	+ 7' 32"

== Stage 12 ==
17 July 1992 — Dole to Saint Gervais-les-Bains, 267.5 km (166.2 mi)

Stage 12 result

Rank	Rider	Team	Time
1	Rolf Järmann (SUI)	Ariostea	7h 10' 56"
2	Pedro Delgado (ESP)	Banesto	+ 3"
3	Stephen Roche (IRL)	Carrera Jeans–Vagabond	+ 39"
4	Giancarlo Perini (ITA)	Carrera Jeans–Vagabond	+ 1' 43"
5	Fabrice Philipot (FRA)	Banesto	s.t.
6	Acácio da Silva (POR)	Lotus–Festina	+ 2' 42"
7	Francisco Javier Mauleón (ESP)	Clas-Cajastur	s.t.
8	Jean-Cyril Robin (FRA)	Castorama	s.t.
9	Jan Nevens (BEL)	Lotto–Mavic–MBK	+ 2' 45"
10	Arsenio González (ESP)	Clas-Cajastur	+ 2' 52"

General classification after stage 12

Rank	Rider	Team	Time
1	Pascal Lino (FRA)	RMO	55h 46' 51"
2	Miguel Indurain (ESP)	Banesto	+ 1' 27"
3	Stephen Roche (IRL)	Carrera Jeans–Vagabond	+ 1' 58"
4	Pedro Delgado (ESP)	Banesto	+ 4' 08"
5	Greg LeMond (USA)	Z	+ 4' 27"
6	Gianni Bugno (ITA)	Gatorade–Chateau d'Ax	+ 4' 39"
7	Claudio Chiappucci (ITA)	Carrera Jeans–Vagabond	+ 4' 54"
8	Giancarlo Perini (ITA)	Carrera Jeans–Vagabond	+ 5' 31"
9	Yvon Ledanois (FRA)	Castorama	+ 5' 52"
10	Laurent Fignon (FRA)	Gatorade–Chateau d'Ax	+ 7' 32"

== Stage 13 ==
18 July 1992 — Saint Gervais-les-Bains to Sestriere, 254.5 km (158.1 mi)

Stage 13 result

Rank	Rider	Team	Time
1	Claudio Chiappucci (ITA)	Carrera Jeans–Vagabond	7h 44' 51"
2	Franco Vona (ITA)	GB–MG Maglificio	+ 1' 34"
3	Miguel Indurain (ESP)	Banesto	+ 1' 45"
4	Gianni Bugno (ITA)	Gatorade–Chateau d'Ax	+ 2' 53"
5	Andrew Hampsten (USA)	Motorola	+ 3' 27"
6	Laurent Fignon (FRA)	Gatorade–Chateau d'Ax	+ 5' 51"
7	Gert-Jan Theunisse (NED)	TVM–Sanyo	+ 7' 36"
8	Pedro Delgado (ESP)	Banesto	+ 7' 51"
9	Steven Rooks (NED)	Buckler–Colnago–Decca	s.t.
10	Francisco Javier Mauleón (ESP)	Clas-Cajastur	+ 7' 53"

General classification after stage 13

Rank	Rider	Team	Time
1	Miguel Indurain (ESP)	Banesto	63h 34' 54"
2	Claudio Chiappucci (ITA)	Carrera Jeans–Vagabond	+ 1' 42"
3	Gianni Bugno (ITA)	Gatorade–Chateau d'Ax	+ 4' 20"
4	Pascal Lino (FRA)	RMO	+ 7' 21"
5	Pedro Delgado (ESP)	Banesto	+ 8' 47"
6	Stephen Roche (IRL)	Carrera Jeans–Vagabond	+ 9' 13"
7	Laurent Fignon (FRA)	Gatorade–Chateau d'Ax	+ 10' 11"
8	Andrew Hampsten (USA)	Motorola	+ 11' 16"
9	Giancarlo Perini (ITA)	Carrera Jeans–Vagabond	+ 12' 43"
10	Jens Heppner (GER)	Team Telekom	+ 13' 11"

== Stage 14 ==
19 July 1992 — Sestriere to Alpe d'Huez, 186.5 km (115.9 mi)

Stage 14 result

Rank	Rider	Team	Time
1	Andrew Hampsten (USA)	Motorola	5h 41' 58"
2	Franco Vona (ITA)	GB–MG Maglificio	+ 1' 17"
3	Éric Boyer (FRA)	Z	+ 2' 08"
4	Jan Nevens (BEL)	Lotto–Mavic–MBK	+ 2' 46"
5	Claudio Chiappucci (ITA)	Carrera Jeans–Vagabond	+ 3' 15"
6	Miguel Indurain (ESP)	Banesto	s.t.
7	Jon Unzaga (ESP)	Clas-Cajastur	+ 3' 28"
8	Richard Virenque (FRA)	RMO	+ 4' 04"
9	Gert-Jan Theunisse (NED)	TVM–Sanyo	+ 4' 13"
10	Erik Breukink (NED)	PDM–Ultima–Concorde	+ 4' 42"

General classification after stage 14

Rank	Rider	Team	Time
1	Miguel Indurain (ESP)	Banesto	69h 20' 07"
2	Claudio Chiappucci (ITA)	Carrera Jeans–Vagabond	+ 1' 42"
3	Andrew Hampsten (USA)	Motorola	+ 8' 01"
4	Pascal Lino (FRA)	RMO	+ 9' 16"
5	Gianni Bugno (ITA)	Gatorade–Chateau d'Ax	+ 10' 09"
6	Pedro Delgado (ESP)	Banesto	+ 11' 38"
7	Erik Breukink (NED)	PDM–Ultima–Concorde	+ 15' 48"
8	Giancarlo Perini (ITA)	Carrera Jeans–Vagabond	+ 15' 56"
9	Franco Vona (ITA)	GB–MG Maglificio	+ 16' 41"
10	Jens Heppner (GER)	Team Telekom	+ 17' 51"

== Stage 15 ==
20 July 1992 — Le Bourg-d'Oisans to Saint-Étienne, 198 km (123 mi)

Stage 15 result

Rank	Rider	Team	Time
1	Franco Chioccioli (ITA)	GB–MG Maglificio	4h 43' 59"
2	Dimitri Konyshev (RUS)	TVM–Sanyo	+ 42"
3	Giancarlo Perini (ITA)	Carrera Jeans–Vagabond	+ 43"
4	Laurent Jalabert (FRA)	ONCE	+ 49"
5	Claudio Chiappucci (ITA)	Carrera Jeans–Vagabond	s.t.
6	Pascal Lino (FRA)	RMO	s.t.
7	Massimo Ghirotto (ITA)	Carrera Jeans–Vagabond	s.t.
8	Jon Unzaga (ESP)	Clas-Cajastur	s.t.
9	Raúl Alcalá (MEX)	PDM–Ultima–Concorde	s.t.
10	Steven Rooks (NED)	Buckler–Colnago–Decca	s.t.

General classification after stage 15

Rank	Rider	Team	Time
1	Miguel Indurain (ESP)	Banesto	74h 04' 55"
2	Claudio Chiappucci (ITA)	Carrera Jeans–Vagabond	+ 1' 42"
3	Andrew Hampsten (USA)	Motorola	+ 8' 01"
4	Pascal Lino (FRA)	RMO	+ 9' 16"
5	Gianni Bugno (ITA)	Gatorade–Chateau d'Ax	+ 10' 09"
6	Pedro Delgado (ESP)	Banesto	+ 11' 38"
7	Erik Breukink (NED)	PDM–Ultima–Concorde	+ 15' 48"
8	Giancarlo Perini (ITA)	Carrera Jeans–Vagabond	+ 15' 50"
9	Stephen Roche (IRL)	Carrera Jeans–Vagabond	+ 18' 03"
10	Jens Heppner (GER)	Team Telekom	+ 18' 22"

== Stage 16 ==
21 July 1992 — Saint-Étienne to La Bourboule, 212 km (132 mi)

Stage 16 result

Rank	Rider	Team	Time
1	Stephen Roche (IRL)	Carrera Jeans–Vagabond	5h 52' 14"
2	Viatcheslav Ekimov (RUS)	Panasonic–Sportlife	+ 46"
3	Jon Unzaga (ESP)	Clas-Cajastur	+ 50"
4	Claudio Chiappucci (ITA)	Carrera Jeans–Vagabond	+ 51"
5	Steven Rooks (NED)	Buckler–Colnago–Decca	s.t.
6	Laurent Jalabert (FRA)	ONCE	s.t.
7	Miguel Indurain (ESP)	Banesto	s.t.
8	Gianni Bugno (ITA)	Gatorade–Chateau d'Ax	s.t.
9	Massimo Ghirotto (ITA)	Carrera Jeans–Vagabond	+ 55"
10	Erik Breukink (NED)	PDM–Ultima–Concorde	+ 57"

General classification after stage 16

Rank	Rider	Team	Time
1	Miguel Indurain (ESP)	Banesto	79h 58' 00"
2	Claudio Chiappucci (ITA)	Carrera Jeans–Vagabond	+ 1' 42"
3	Andrew Hampsten (USA)	Motorola	+ 8' 07"
4	Pascal Lino (FRA)	RMO	+ 9' 22"
5	Gianni Bugno (ITA)	Gatorade–Chateau d'Ax	+ 10' 09"
6	Pedro Delgado (ESP)	Banesto	+ 11' 50"
7	Erik Breukink (NED)	PDM–Ultima–Concorde	+ 15' 54"
8	Giancarlo Perini (ITA)	Carrera Jeans–Vagabond	+ 15' 56"
9	Stephen Roche (IRL)	Carrera Jeans–Vagabond	+ 17' 12"
10	Franco Vona (ITA)	GB–MG Maglificio	+ 19' 22"

== Stage 17 ==
22 July 1992 — La Bourboule to Montluçon, 189 km (117 mi)

Stage 17 result

Rank	Rider	Team	Time
1	Jean-Claude Colotti (FRA)	Z	4h 34' 55"
2	Frans Maassen (NED)	Buckler–Colnago–Decca	+ 3' 31"
3	Marc Sergeant (BEL)	Panasonic–Sportlife	s.t.
4	Philippe Louviot (FRA)	ONCE	+ 8' 34"
5	Guy Nulens (BEL)	Panasonic–Sportlife	s.t.
6	Søren Lilholt (DEN)	Tulip	+ 15' 43"
7	Johan Museeuw (BEL)	Lotto–Mavic–MBK	+ 16' 15"
8	Jean-Paul van Poppel (NED)	PDM–Ultima–Concorde	s.t.
9	Peter De Clercq (BEL)	Lotto–Mavic–MBK	s.t.
10	Laurent Jalabert (FRA)	ONCE	s.t.

General classification after stage 17

Rank	Rider	Team	Time
1	Miguel Indurain (ESP)	Banesto	84h 49' 10"
2	Claudio Chiappucci (ITA)	Carrera Jeans–Vagabond	+ 1' 42"
3	Andrew Hampsten (USA)	Motorola	+ 8' 07"
4	Pascal Lino (FRA)	RMO	+ 9' 22"
5	Gianni Bugno (ITA)	Gatorade–Chateau d'Ax	+ 10' 09"
6	Pedro Delgado (ESP)	Banesto	+ 11' 50"
7	Erik Breukink (NED)	PDM–Ultima–Concorde	+ 15' 54"
8	Giancarlo Perini (ITA)	Carrera Jeans–Vagabond	+ 15' 56"
9	Stephen Roche (IRL)	Carrera Jeans–Vagabond	+ 17' 12"
10	Franco Vona (ITA)	GB–MG Maglificio	+ 19' 22"

== Stage 18 ==
23 July 1992 — Montluçon to Tours, 212 km (132 mi)

Stage 18 result

Rank	Rider	Team	Time
1	Thierry Marie (FRA)	Castorama	5h 07' 15"
2	Jelle Nijdam (NED)	Buckler–Colnago–Decca	s.t.
3	Johan Museeuw (BEL)	Lotto–Mavic–MBK	s.t.
4	Olaf Ludwig (GER)	Panasonic–Sportlife	s.t.
5	Laurent Jalabert (FRA)	ONCE	s.t.
6	Acácio da Silva (POR)	Lotus–Festina	s.t.
7	Giovanni Fidanza (ITA)	Gatorade–Chateau d'Ax	s.t.
8	Søren Lilholt (DEN)	Tulip	s.t.
9	Phil Anderson (AUS)	Motorola	s.t.
10	Henri Manders (NED)	Helvetia-Commodore	s.t.

General classification after stage 18

Rank	Rider	Team	Time
1	Miguel Indurain (ESP)	Banesto	89h 56' 25"
2	Claudio Chiappucci (ITA)	Carrera Jeans–Vagabond	+ 1' 42"
3	Andrew Hampsten (USA)	Motorola	+ 8' 07"
4	Pascal Lino (FRA)	RMO	+ 9' 22"
5	Gianni Bugno (ITA)	Gatorade–Chateau d'Ax	+ 10' 09"
6	Pedro Delgado (ESP)	Banesto	+ 11' 50"
7	Erik Breukink (NED)	PDM–Ultima–Concorde	+ 15' 54"
8	Giancarlo Perini (ITA)	Carrera Jeans–Vagabond	+ 15' 56"
9	Stephen Roche (IRL)	Carrera Jeans–Vagabond	+ 17' 12"
10	Franco Vona (ITA)	GB–MG Maglificio	+ 19' 22"

== Stage 19 ==
24 July 1992 — Tours to Blois, 64 km (40 mi) (ITT)

Stage 19 result

Rank	Rider	Team	Time
1	Miguel Indurain (ESP)	Banesto	1h 13' 21"
2	Gianni Bugno (ITA)	Gatorade–Chateau d'Ax	+ 40"
3	Dimitri Zhdanov (RUS)	Panasonic–Sportlife	+ 2' 28"
4	Jean-François Bernard (FRA)	Banesto	+ 2' 37"
5	Viatcheslav Ekimov (RUS)	Panasonic–Sportlife	+ 2' 41"
6	Claudio Chiappucci (ITA)	Carrera Jeans–Vagabond	+ 2' 53"
7	Erik Breukink (NED)	PDM–Ultima–Concorde	+ 2' 57"
8	Stephen Roche (IRL)	Carrera Jeans–Vagabond	+ 3' 11"
9	Philippe Louviot (FRA)	ONCE	+ 3' 12"
10	Giancarlo Perini (ITA)	Carrera Jeans–Vagabond	+ 3' 20"

General classification after stage 19

Rank	Rider	Team	Time
1	Miguel Indurain (ESP)	Banesto	91h 09' 46"
2	Claudio Chiappucci (ITA)	Carrera Jeans–Vagabond	+ 4' 35"
3	Gianni Bugno (ITA)	Gatorade–Chateau d'Ax	+ 10' 49"
4	Andrew Hampsten (USA)	Motorola	+ 13' 40"
5	Pascal Lino (FRA)	RMO	+ 14' 37"
6	Pedro Delgado (ESP)	Banesto	+ 15' 16"
7	Erik Breukink (NED)	PDM–Ultima–Concorde	+ 18' 51"
8	Giancarlo Perini (ITA)	Carrera Jeans–Vagabond	+ 19' 16"
9	Stephen Roche (IRL)	Carrera Jeans–Vagabond	+ 20' 23"
10	Jens Heppner (GER)	Team Telekom	+ 25' 30"

== Stage 20 ==
25 July 1992 — Blois to Nanterre, 222 km (138 mi)

Stage 20 result

Rank	Rider	Team	Time
1	Peter De Clercq (BEL)	Lotto–Mavic–MBK	6h 03' 36"
2	Flavio Vanzella (ITA)	GB–MG Maglificio	s.t.
3	Thierry Laurent (FRA)	RMO	s.t.
4	Rolf Järmann (SUI)	Ariostea	s.t.
5	Dominik Krieger (GER)	Helvetia-Commodore	s.t.
6	José Ramón Uriarte (ESP)	Banesto	s.t.
7	Michel Dernies (BEL)	Motorola	s.t.
8	Maarten den Bakker (NED)	PDM–Ultima–Concorde	s.t.
9	Brian Holm (DEN)	Tulip	+ 3' 49"
10	Rik Van Slycke (BEL)	Lotto–Mavic–MBK	+ 3' 51"

General classification after stage 20

Rank	Rider	Team	Time
1	Miguel Indurain (ESP)	Banesto	97h 20' 53"
2	Claudio Chiappucci (ITA)	Carrera Jeans–Vagabond	+ 4' 35"
3	Gianni Bugno (ITA)	Gatorade–Chateau d'Ax	+ 10' 49"
4	Andrew Hampsten (USA)	Motorola	+ 13' 40"
5	Pascal Lino (FRA)	RMO	+ 14' 37"
6	Pedro Delgado (ESP)	Banesto	+ 15' 16"
7	Erik Breukink (NED)	PDM–Ultima–Concorde	+ 18' 51"
8	Giancarlo Perini (ITA)	Carrera Jeans–Vagabond	+ 19' 16"
9	Stephen Roche (IRL)	Carrera Jeans–Vagabond	+ 20' 23"
10	Jens Heppner (GER)	Team Telekom	+ 25' 30"

== Stage 21 ==
26 July 1992 — La Défense to Paris Champs-Élysées, 141 km (88 mi)

Stage 21 result

Rank	Rider	Team	Time
1	Olaf Ludwig (GER)	Panasonic–Sportlife	3h 28' 37"
2	Jean-Paul van Poppel (NED)	PDM–Ultima–Concorde	s.t.
3	Johan Museeuw (BEL)	Lotto–Mavic–MBK	s.t.
4	Laurent Jalabert (FRA)	ONCE	s.t.
5	Søren Lilholt (DEN)	Tulip	s.t.
6	Frankie Andreu (USA)	Motorola	s.t.
7	Allan Peiper (AUS)	Tulip	s.t.
8	Giovanni Fidanza (ITA)	Gatorade–Chateau d'Ax	s.t.
9	Etienne De Wilde (BEL)	Team Telekom	s.t.
10	Viatcheslav Ekimov (RUS)	Panasonic–Sportlife	s.t.

General classification after stage 21

Rank	Rider	Team	Time
1	Miguel Indurain (ESP)	Banesto	100h 49' 30"
2	Claudio Chiappucci (ITA)	Carrera Jeans–Vagabond	+ 4' 35"
3	Gianni Bugno (ITA)	Gatorade–Chateau d'Ax	+ 10' 49"
4	Andrew Hampsten (USA)	Motorola	+ 13' 40"
5	Pascal Lino (FRA)	RMO	+ 14' 37"
6	Pedro Delgado (ESP)	Banesto	+ 15' 16"
7	Erik Breukink (NED)	PDM–Ultima–Concorde	+ 18' 51"
8	Giancarlo Perini (ITA)	Carrera Jeans–Vagabond	+ 19' 16"
9	Stephen Roche (IRL)	Carrera Jeans–Vagabond	+ 20' 23"
10	Jens Heppner (GER)	Team Telekom	+ 25' 30"
