= 1993 UCI Cyclo-cross World Championships =

Cyclo-cross championship

- Venue: Corva, Italy
- Date: 30–31 January 1993
- Coordinates: 45°53′N 12°43′E
- Cyclists participating: 29 (Elite), 62 (Amateurs), 47 (Juniors)
- Events: 3

The 1990 UCI Cyclo-cross World Championships were held in Corva, Italy on 30 and 31 January 1993. It was the 44th edition of the UCI Cyclo-cross World Championships.

== Men's Elite results ==
| RANK | NAME | TIME |
|---|---|---|
| Gold medal | Dominique Arnould (FRA) | 1:03:17 |
| Silver medal | Mike Kluge (GER) | + 0:09 |
| Bronze medal | Wim de Vos (NED) | + 0:16 |
| 4. | David Pagnier (FRA) | + 0:47 |
| 5. | Adrie van der Poel (NED) | + 2:07 |
| 6. | Fabrizio Margon (ITA) | + 2:22 |
| 7. | Beat Wabel (SUI) | + 2:33 |
| 8. | Paul De Brauwer (BEL) | + 2:36 |
| 9. | Sandro Bono (ITA) | + 2:37 |
| 10. | Luca Bramati (ITA) | + 2:46 |

== Men's Amateurs results ==
| RANK | NAME | TIME |
|---|---|---|
| Gold medal | Henrik Djernis (DEN) | 46:23 |
| Silver medal | Ralph Berner (GER) | + 0:06 |
| Bronze medal | Daniele Pontoni (ITA) | + 0:30 |
| 4. | Ondřej Lukeš (CZE) | s.t. |
| 5. | Richard Groenendaal (NED) | + 0:36 |
| 6. | Thomas Frischknecht (SUI) | + 0:40 |
| 7. | Dariusz Gil (POL) | + 0:43 |
| 8. | Marc Janssens (BEL) | + 0:46 |
| 9. | Pavel Elsnic (CZE) | + 0:51 |
| 10. | Urs Markwalder (SUI) | + 1:08 |

== Men's Juniors results ==
| RANK | NAME | TIME |
|---|---|---|
| Gold medal | Kamil Ausbuher (CZE) | 45:18 |
| Silver medal | Jaromír Friede (CZE) | + 0:38 |
| Bronze medal | Miguel Martinez (FRA) | + 0:51 |
| 4. | Beat Blum (SUI) | + 0:53 |
| 5. | Urs Steinmann (GER) | + 1:05 |
| 6. | Elvis Zucchi (ITA) | + 1:26 |
| 7. | Gretenius Gommers (NED) | + 1:31 |
| 8. | Mark Eberhart (GER) | + 1:57 |
| 9. | Aleš Mudroch (CZE) | + 2:35 |
| 10. | Yader Zoli (ITA) | s.t. |
