= Pascal Lino =

French cyclist

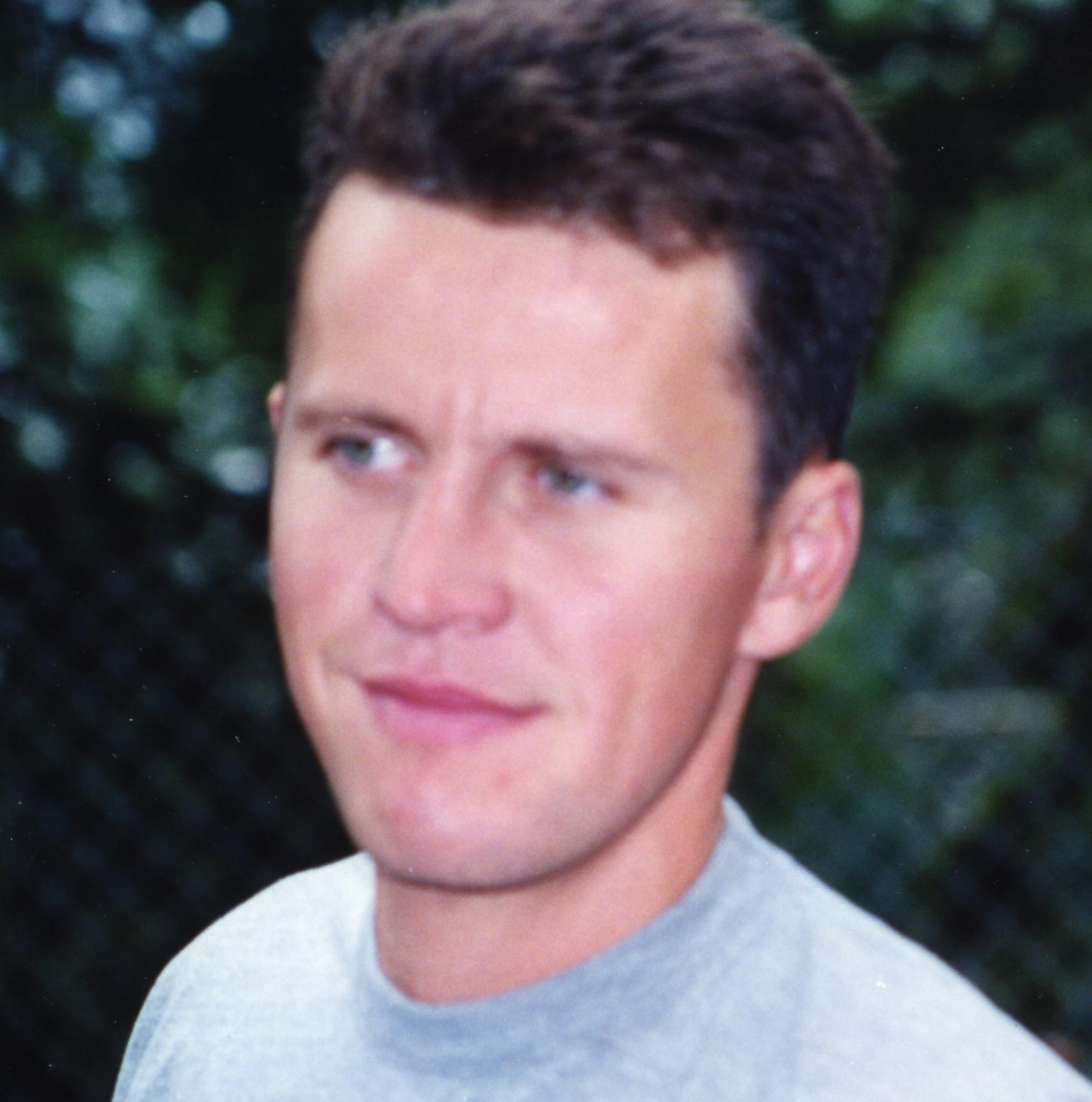

Personal information
- Full name: Pascal Lino
- Born: 13 August 1966 (age 60) Sartrouville, France
- Height: 1.86 m (6 ft 1 in)
- Weight: 72 kg (159 lb; 11 st 5 lb)

Cycling career
- Sport: Cycling
- Discipline: Road
- Role: Rider

Professional teams
- 1988–1992: RMO–Cycles Méral–Mavic
- 1993–1994: Festina–Lotus
- 1995: Le Groupement
- 1996: Roslotto–ZG Mobili
- 1997–1999: BigMat–Auber 93
- 2000–2001: Festina

Pascal Lino (born 13 August 1966) is a French former road racing cyclist. Lino turned professional in 1988, and is most famous for being the wearer of the yellow jersey of the 1992 Tour de France for 11 days. He represented his native country at the 1988 Summer Olympics in the Men's Points Race.

== Career ==
Lino was born on August 13, 1966, in Sartrouville, Yvelines. He started cycling in 1980, and was later based in Vannes, Brittany. Lino competed for France on the track in Seoul at the 1988 Olympic Games, placing fourth in the pursuit and seventh in the points race. Turning pro in 1989, Lino had success early in his professional road racing career in 1989 by winning the Tour of the European Community stage race in Luxembourg.

Riding for RMO during the 1992 Tour de France, Lino took over the leader's yellow jersey from his RMO teammate Richard Virenque at the conclusion of stage three from Pau to Bordeaux on 7 July 1992, having been the best placed rider in the overall standings in a ten-man breakaway which includes eventual stage winner Rob Harmeling, as well as riders such as Massimo Ghirotto, Jérôme Simon and Allan Peiper. Lino placed fourth on the stage, but had gained a +1:39 overall advantage over Virenque to gain yellow. After the sixth stage in Brussels, Lino had increased his lead at the top of the standings, and his overall advantage stood at over three minutes as the race headed into the individual time trial after he had spent a week in yellow. The time trial was expected to end his days in yellow, with Lino having finished more than six minutes behind race winner Miguel Indurain in both stages in the discipline during the previous year's Tour. However, Lino performed well enough in the time trial in Luxembourg to keep the yellow jersey by a +1:27 margin over Indurain, finishing with the sixth best time, only two seconds behind multiple-Tour winner Greg Lemond and ahead of a host of other race favourites and precious winners, such as Laurent Fignon, Pablo Delgado and Claudio Chiappucci. After 11 days in yellow, Lino lost the race lead to Indurain after the first Alpine stage on 19 July, which finished in Sestriere, won with a solo attack by Chiappucci, with Lino dropping to fourth overall. Lino ultimately finished the three week race in fifth place, having been overtaken in the standings by Italian Gianni Bugno in the final time trial.

At the 1993 Amstel Gold Race, Lino received a six-month suspended sentence for failing a doping control whilst riding for Festina. On 20 July, he was the first French stage winner at the 1993 Tour de France, winning a two-man sprint in Perpignan against Italian Giancarlo Perini, with the pair having escaped from a breakaway group which included Johan Bruyneel and Gianni Faresin. He later finished 11th overall in the 1994 Tour.

Lino won Paris–Camembert in 1998. He was suspended by Big Mat-Auber 93 in 1999 for the reported use of corticoids without the knowledge of the medical staff of the team, although he did not fail a test. He competed in the Tour de France for the tenth and final time in 2001, completing the race for the eighth time having only abandoned in 1996 and 1997.

=== Post-racing career ===
After retiring from racing in 2001, Lino returned to Vannes in Brittany, and worked as a race director for ASO, with responsibilities including working at the Tour de France as a driver in an organisation car following combatants in the race. His son Julian Lino also raced as a cyclist.

== Career achievements ==
=== Major results ===
1986
2nd Duo Normand
1987
2nd Overall Ruban Granitier Breton
10th Overall Tour Méditerranéen
1988
1st Prologue Tour of Greece
1989
1st Overall Tour de la Communauté Européenne
8th Grand Prix de la Libération
9th Overall Critérium International

1st Stage 2

1992
5th Overall Tour de France, Held for 11 days
1993
1st Stage 14 Tour de France
1994
8th Overall Route du Sud
1995
8th Chrono des Herbiers
1997
2nd Circuit de la Sarthe
2nd Cholet-Pays de Loire
3rd Critérium International
6th La Flèche Wallonne
6th GP de la Ville de Rennes
10th Overall Paris–Nice
1998
1st Overall French Road Cycling Cup
1st Paris–Camembert
2nd Cholet-Pays de Loire
3rd Route Adélie
3rd Polymultipliée de l'Hautil
5th Overall Tour du Limousin

=== Grand Tour general classification results timeline ===
Grand Tour	1990	1991	1992	1993	1994	1995	1996	1997	1998	1999	2000	2001
Giro d'Italia	—	—	—	—	—	—	—	—	—	—	—	—
Tour de France	23	70	5	43	11	—	DNF	DNF	78	—	112	87
Vuelta a España	—	35	—	—	14	—	—	—	—	—	—	—

Legend
DSQ	Disqualified
DNF	Did not finish
