= Jim Van De Laer =

Belgian cyclist

Personal information
- Full name: Jim Van De Laer
- Born: 11 April 1968 (age 58) Aarschot

Cycling career
- Sport: Cycling
- Current team: Retired
- Discipline: Road
- Role: Rider

Professional teams
- 1989: Humo-TW
- 1990–1992: IOC–Tulip Computers
- 1993–1995: Lotto
- 1996: TVM–Farm Frites
- 1997: Cofidis

Jim Van De Laer (born 11 April 1968 in Aarschot) is a former Belgian cyclist.

== Major results ==
1993
1st Stage 3 Vuelta a los Valles Mineros
1995
1st Overall Niederösterreich Rundfahrt

== Grand Tour Results ==
=== Tour de France ===
- 1992: 30th
- 1993: DNF
- 1994: 24th
- 1995: 76th

=== Giro d'Italia ===
- 1995: DNF

=== Vuelta a España ===
- 1991: 32nd
