= Martin Kokkelkoren =

Dutch cyclist

Personal information
- Born: 14 April 1969 (age 57)

Cycling career
- Sport: Cycling
- Role: Rider

Martin Kokkelkoren (born 14 April 1969) is a Dutch racing cyclist. He rode in the 1992 Tour de France.
