= Mark Eberhart =

American chemist

Mark Evan Eberhart is an author and a professor of chemistry and geochemistry at the Colorado School of Mines.

== Education and career ==
Eberhart holds a BS in chemistry and in applied mathematics from the University of Colorado, an MS in physical biochemistry from the University of Colorado, and a PhD in materials science and engineering from the Massachusetts Institute of Technology, supervised by Keith H. Johnson and earned in 1983. He became a scientist in the Materials Science and Technology Division of the Los Alamos National Laboratory before moving to the Colorado School of Mines in 1992. At the School of Mines, he has been president of the faculty senate; he has also been a Jefferson Science Fellow.

== Books ==
Eberhart has published two books: Why Things Break: Understanding the World By the Way It Comes Apart (Random House, 2003), an autobiographical book describing his education and his studies of stress and fracture and Feeding the Fire: The Lost History and Uncertain Future of Mankind's Energy Addiction (Random House, 2007).
