= Peter De Clercq =

Belgian cyclist

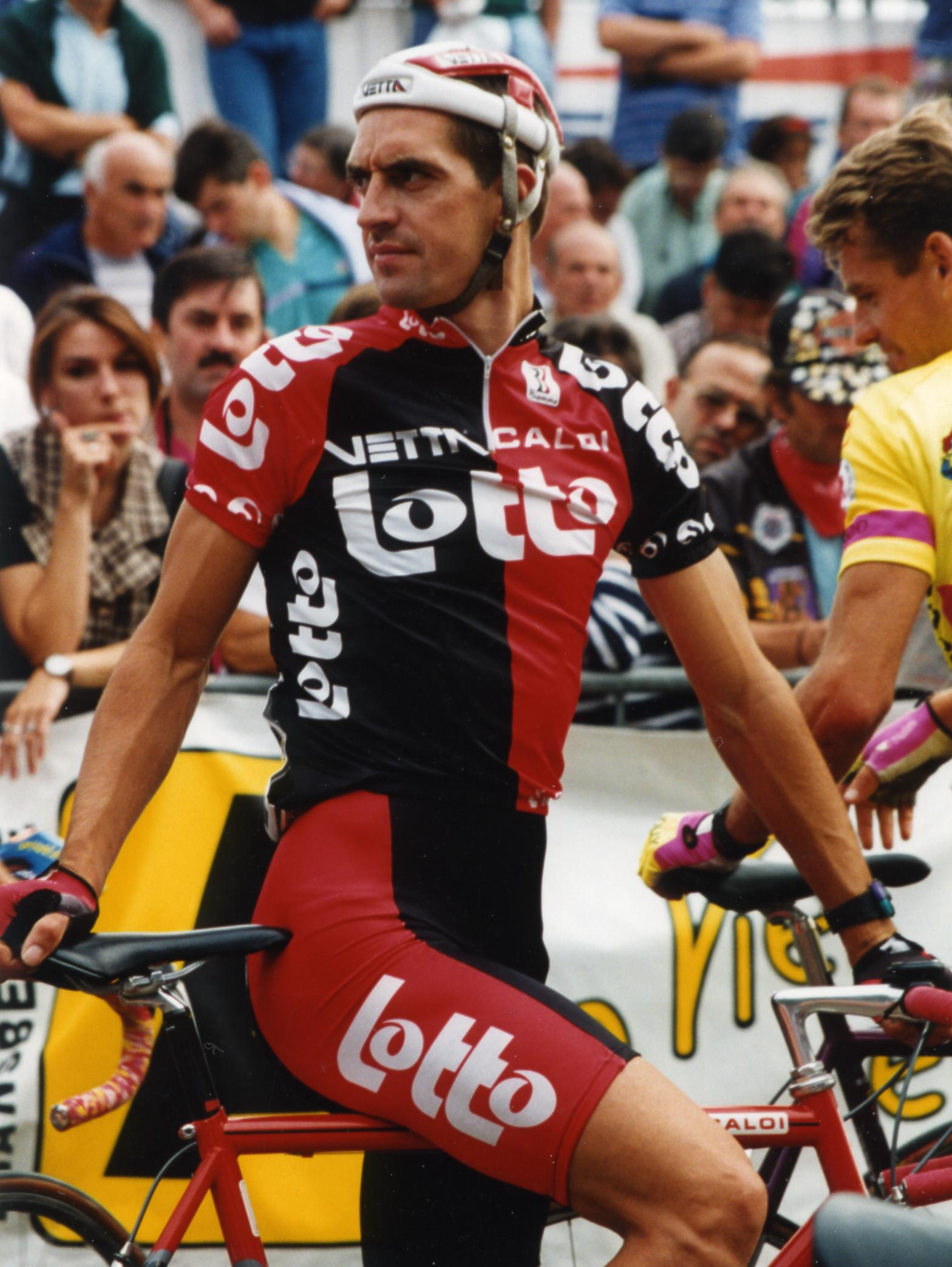

Personal information
- Full name: Peter De Clercq
- Born: 2 July 1966 (age 60) Belgium

Cycling career
- Sport: Cycling
- Current team: Retired
- Discipline: Road
- Role: Rider

Major wins
- 1 stage 1992 Tour de France

Peter De Clercq (Oudenaarde, 2 July 1966) is a Belgian former professional road bicycle racer. In the 1992 Tour de France, De Clercq was the winner of the 20th stage.

== Major results ==
1987
Internationale Wielertrofee Jong Maar Moedig
Circuit du Hainaut
1988
Aartrijke
Ninove
Temse
1989
Heusden Limburg
1990
Ruddervoorde
1991
Grote Prijs Stad Zottegem
1992
A Travers le Morbihan
Route Adélie
Mere
Tour de France:

Winner stage 20

1993
Deinze
1994
A Travers le Morbihan
Deinze
Nokere Koerse
La Louvière
1995
Grand Prix de Rennes
1996
Zwevezele
