= Franco Vona =

Italian cyclist

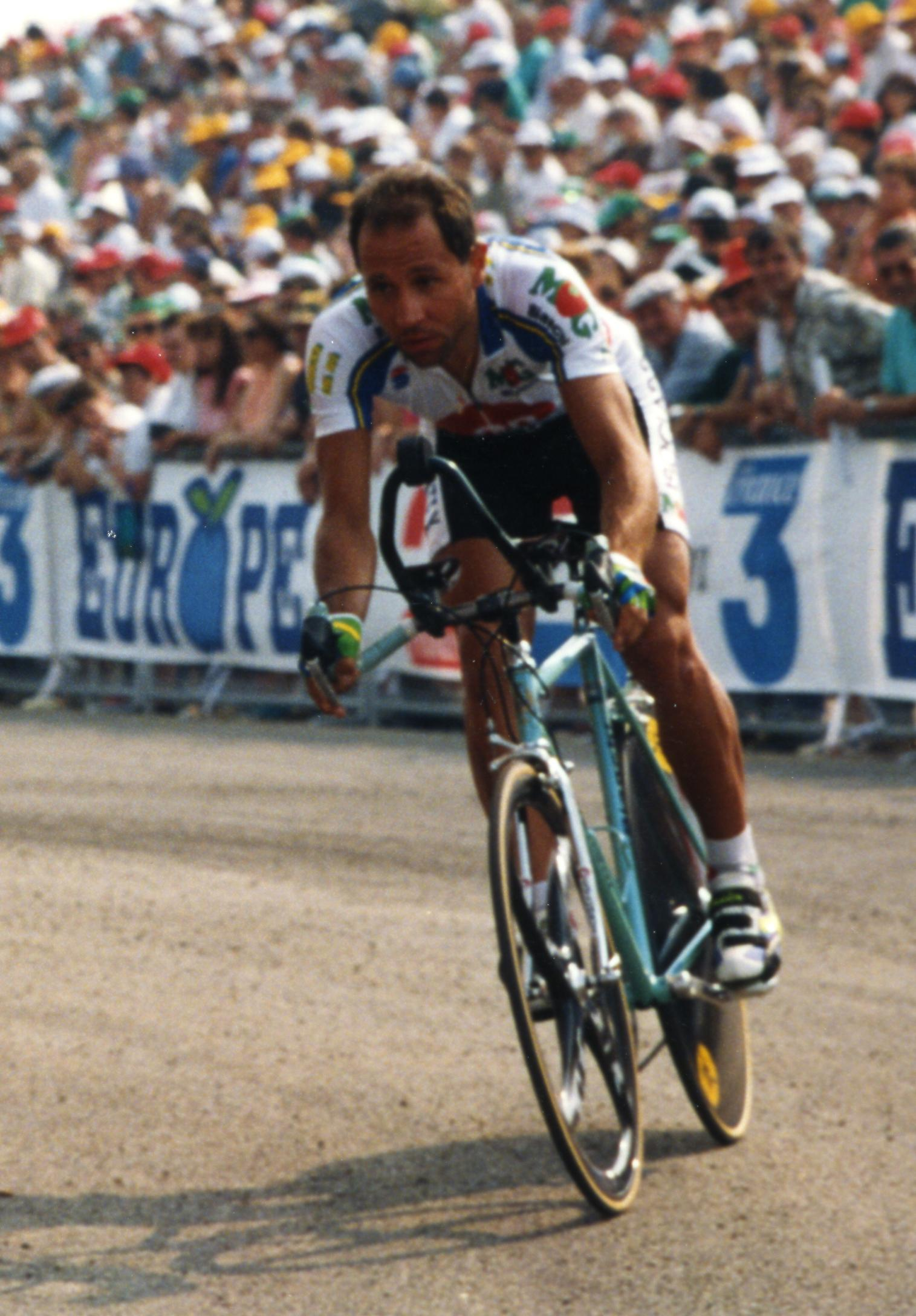
- Vona at the 1993 Tour de France

Personal information
- Full name: Franco Vona
- Born: 20 August 1964 (age 62) Frosinone, Italy

Cycling career
- Sport: Cycling
- Discipline: Road
- Role: Rider

Professional teams
- 1987–1990: Supermercati Brianzoli–Chateau d'Ax
- 1991: Jolly Componibili–Club 88
- 1992–1995: GB–MG Maglificio
- 1996: Aki–Gipiemme

Franco Vona (born 20 August 1964) is a former Italian racing cyclist. Vona won three stages of the Giro d'Italia and placed 6th overall in 1992. During the 1992 Tour de France he placed 2nd on the only two high mountain stages of the race and was inside the top 10 until the final ITT which dropped him to 11th. Later in his career he rode on the powerful Maglificio team of Patrick Lefevere and Roger De Vlaeminck and earned TTT stage victories in the 1993 and 1994 editions of the Tour de France.

== Major results ==
1988
1st Stage 16, Giro d'Italia
1989
3rd Overall, Vuelta a Venezuela

1st Stage 5

3rd Stage 19, Giro d'Italia
12th, Züri-Metzgete
1991
1st Stage 6, Tour de Suisse
1992
6th Overall, Giro d'Italia

1st Stages 5 & 12

11th Overall, Tour de France

2nd Stages 13 & 14

1993
21st Overall, Tour de France

1st Stage 4 (TTT)

1994
16th, Liège–Bastogne–Liège
37th Overall, Tour de France

1st Stage 3 (TTT)

1995
48th Overall, Tour de France
