= Dominique Arnould =

French cyclist (born 1966)

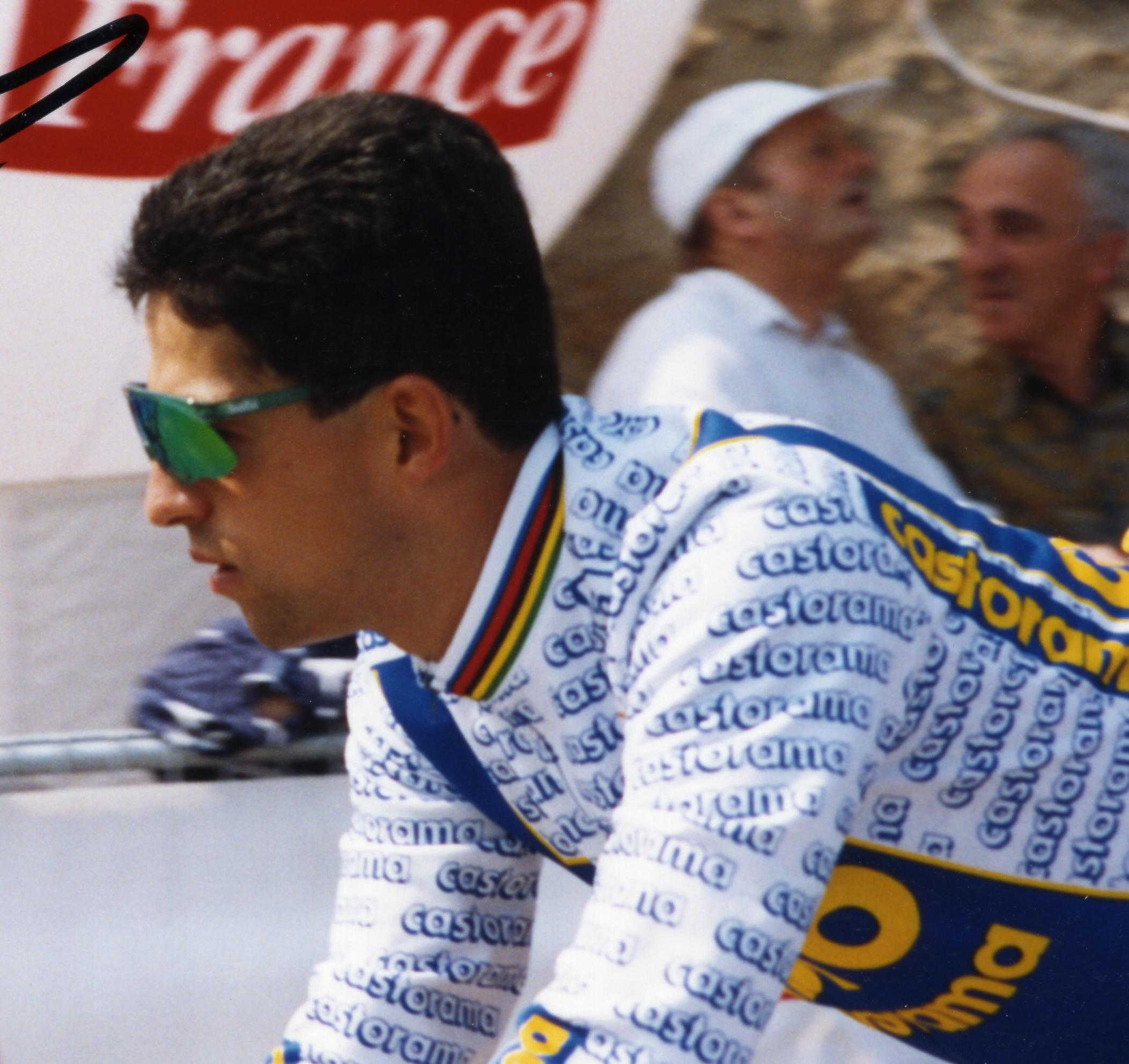
- Arnould at the 1993 Tour de France

Personal information
- Full name: Dominique Arnould
- Born: 19 November 1966 (age 59) Luxeuil-les-Bains, France

Cycling career
- Sport: Cycling
- Current team: Team TotalEnergies
- Disciplines: Road; Cyclo-cross; Mountain bike
- Role: Rider; Directeur sportif

Professional teams
- 1988–1989: Toshiba–Look
- 1990–1994: Castorama
- 1995: Le Groupement
- 1995: CSM Persan–Bic
- 1996: Force Sud
- 1996: Agrigel–La Creuse–Fenioux
- 1997: ProFlex–Mastercard

Managerial team
- 2005–: Bouygues Télécom

Major wins
- Cyclo-cross Championships UCI CX World Championship (1993)
Medal record
Representing France
Men's cyclo-cross
World Championships
Gold medal – first place	Corva 1993	Elite Race

Dominique Arnould (born 19 November 1966 in Luxeuil-les-Bains in Haute-Saône, France) is a French former professional road, cyclo-cross and mountain bike cyclist. As a professional, the greatest wins in Arnould's career were the UCI Cyclo-Cross World Championships in 1993 and a stage win in the 1992 Tour de France. In addition Arnould was the Cyclo-Cross Champion of France five times between 1989 and 2003. He also raced professionally for the Giant mountain bike team, earning several top ten results at world championships in this discipline as well. He retired from professional cycling in 2004 and assumed the position of Directeur Sportif for the French ProTour cycling team Bouygues Télécom, now known as Team TotalEnergies.

== Major results ==
=== Road ===
1987
1st Overall Ronde de l'Isard
1988
4th Overall Tour du Limousin
9th Grand Prix de Wallonie
1989
9th Overall Étoile de Bessèges
9th Trophée des Grimpeurs
1990
6th Grand Prix d'Isbergues
1991
9th GP Industria & Artigianato di Larciano
1992
1st Overall Giro di Puglia

1st Stage 2

1st Stage 1 Tour de France
2nd GP du canton d'Argovie
1993
1st Stage 2 Tour de l'Avenir
2nd Overall Grand Prix du Midi Libre
1994
2nd Bordeaux–Caudéran
7th Overall Four Days of Dunkirk

=== Grand Tour general classification results timeline ===
Grand Tour	1991	1992	1993	1994	1995	1996
Vuelta a España	—	—	—	—	—	—
Giro d'Italia	29	25	—	—	—	—
Tour de France	68	48	81	—	—	DNF

Legend
—	Did not compete
DNF	Did not finish

=== Cyclo-cross ===
1986–1987
1st National Under-23 Championships
1988–1989
1st National Championships
1989–1990
2nd National Championships
1991–1992
2nd National Championships
1992–1993
1st UCI World Championships
1st National Championships
1993–1994
1st National Championships
UCI World Cup

1st Saint-Herblain

1994–1995
1st Overall Coupe de France de cyclo-cross
UCI World Cup

1st Wangen
1st Sablé-sur-Sarthe

1996–1997
3rd National Championships
1997–1998
2nd National Championships
1999–2000
1st Challenge de la France Cycliste 1, Dercy
2nd National Championships
2001–2002
1st National Championships
1st Challenge de la France Cycliste 3, Dangu
2002–2003
1st National Championships
