= Javier Murguialday =

Spanish cyclist

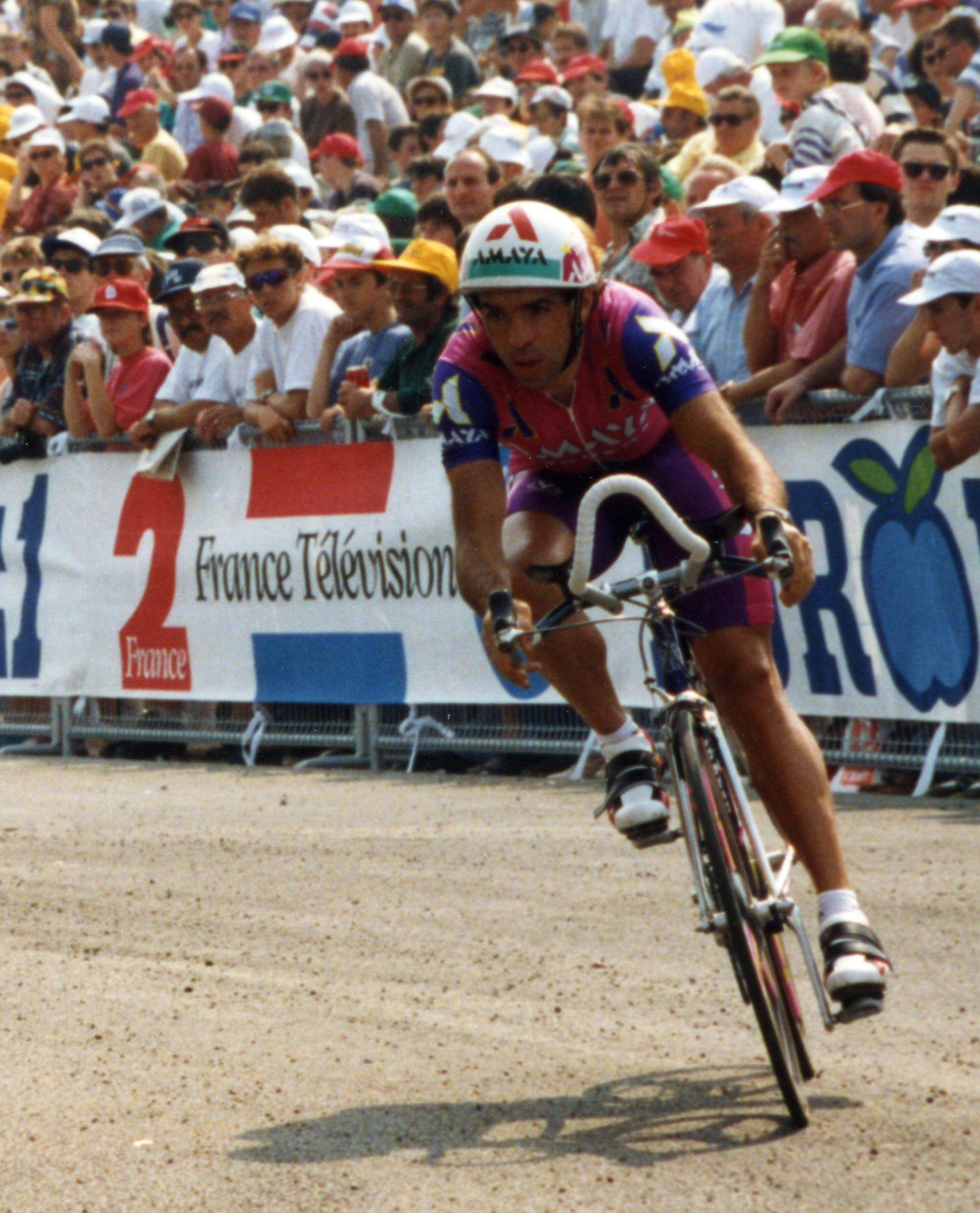
- Murguialday at the 1993 Tour de France

Personal information
- Full name: Javier Murguialday Chasco
- Born: February 4, 1962 (age 64) Salvatierra/Agurain, Spain

Cycling career
- Sport: Cycling
- Current team: Retired
- Discipline: Road
- Role: Rider

Major wins
- 1 stage 1992 Tour de France

Javier Murguialday Chasco (born 4 February 1962) is a Spanish former professional road bicycle racer, who won one stage in the 1992 Tour de France.

== Major results ==
1985
Memorial Valenciaga
1992
Vuelta a Mallorca
Tour de France:

Winner stage 2
