= Rob Harmeling =

Dutch cyclist

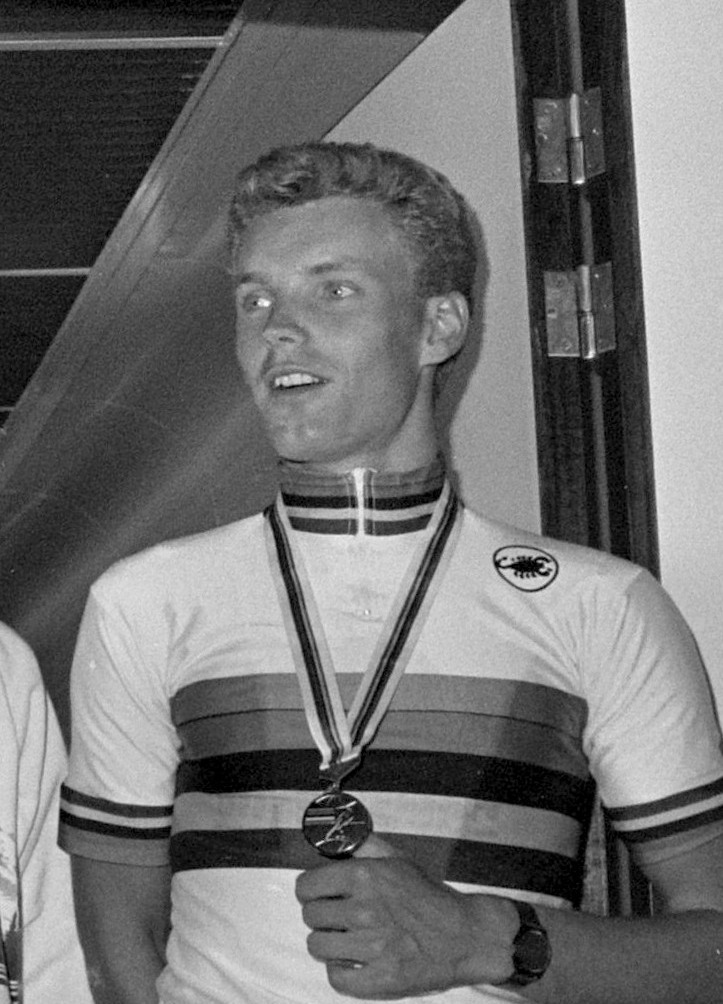
- Harmeling in 1986

Personal information
- Full name: Rob Harmeling
- Born: 4 December 1964 (age 61) Nijverdal, the Netherlands
- Height: 1.87 m (6 ft 2 in)
- Weight: 76 kg (168 lb)

Cycling career
- Sport: Cycling
- Current team: Retired
- Discipline: Road
- Role: Rider

Professional teams
- 1989 - 1990: Histor–Sigma
- 1991 - 1995: TVM

Major wins
- 100 km Team Time Trial World Championships; 1 stage 1992 Tour de France
Medal record
Men's road bicycle racing
Representing Netherlands
World Championships
| Gold medal – first place | 1986 Colorado Springs | Team time trial |

Rob Harmeling (born 4 December 1964) is a retired Dutch professional road bicycle racer. Harmeling rode the Tour de France three times: in 1991 he was the lanterne rouge, in 1992 he won a stage, and in 1994 he was disqualified for hanging onto the team car. As amateur, Harmeling competed in the road race at the 1988 Summer Olympics and finished in 38th place. He won the world title in team time trial at the 1986 UCI Road World Championships.

In 2023 Harmeling joined the new Dutch continental tour team Tour de Tietema-Unibet as directeur sportif.

== Major results ==
1986
Tijdrit Velddriel
World Amateur 100km Team Time Trial Championship
Ronde van Overijssel
Flèche du Sud
1991
Tiel
1992
Steenwijk
Tour de France:

Winner stage 3

== See also ==
- List of Dutch Olympic cyclists
