= Rolf Järmann =

Swiss cyclist (born 1966)

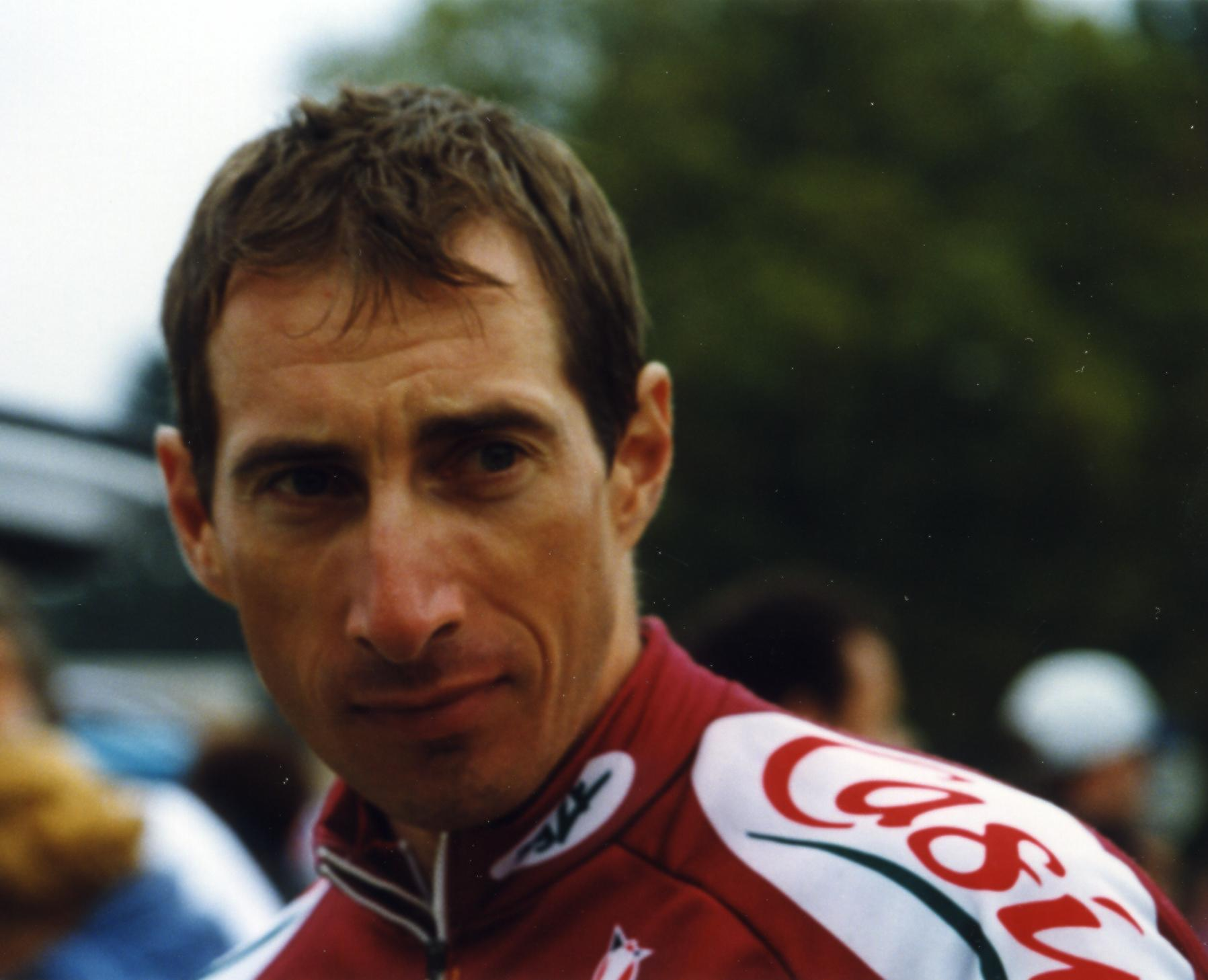

Personal information
- Full name: Rolf Järmann
- Born: 31 January 1966 (age 60) Arbon, Switzerland
- Height: 1.82 m (6 ft 0 in)
- Weight: 73 kg (161 lb; 11 st 7 lb)

Cycling career
- Sport: Cycling
- Current team: Retired
- Discipline: Road
- Role: Rider

Major wins
- Amstel Gold Race (1993, 1998)

Rolf Järmann (born 31 January 1966) is a retired road bicycle racer from Switzerland, who was a professional rider from 1988 to 1999. He twice won the Amstel Gold Race (1993 and 1998) during his career. He was the Swiss National Road Race champion in 1990. He won the Tour de Pologne in 1997. He won a stage in the 1989 Giro d'Italia, the 1992 Tour de France and also won the 1998 Tirreno-Adriatico.

According to a Cyclingnews.com report, in his book Doping, Spitzensport als gesellschaftliches Problem (Doping, Top Sport as a Social Problem), Järmann admits to using EPO.

== Teams ==
- 1988: Cyndarella-Isotonic (Switzerland)
- 1989: Frank-Toyo-Magniflex (Switzerland)
- 1990: Pneuhaus Frank-Toyo (Switzerland)
- 1991: Weinmann-Eddy Merckx (Switzerland)
- 1992: Ceramiche Ariostea (Italy)
- 1993: Ceramiche Ariostea (Italy)
- 1994: GB-MG Maglificio (Italy)
- 1995: MG Maglificio-Technogym (Italy)
- 1996: MG Maglificio-Technogym (Italy)
- 1997: Casino-C'est votre equipe (France)
- 1998: Casino-C'est votre equipe (France)
- 1999: Post Swiss Team (Switzerland)

== Tour de France ==
- 1991 – 83rd place
- 1992 – 62nd place (most combative rider on 3 stages, winner 12th stage)
- 1993 – 54th place
- 1994 – 73rd place
- 1995 – 67th place
- 1996 – 90th place

== Major results ==
1988
Stausee-Rundfahrt Klingnau
1989
Giro d'Italia:

Winner stage 4

1990
1st Road race, National Road Championships
1992
Tour de France:

Winner stage 12

1993
Amstel Gold Race
1995
GP Ouest-France
Tour de Luxembourg
1997
Tour de Pologne
1998
1st Overall Tirreno–Adriatico
Amstel Gold Race
