= Jan Nevens =

Belgian cyclist

Personal information
- Full name: Jan Nevens
- Born: 26 August 1958 (age 68) Ninove, Belgium

Cycling career
- Sport: Cycling
- Discipline: Road
- Role: Rider

Professional teams
- 1980–1981: Boston
- 1982–1983: Europ Décor
- 1984: Splendor-Marc
- 1985: Kwantum Hallen
- 1986–1987: Lotto
- 1988: Sigma-Fina
- 1989–1990: Histor-Sigma
- 1991–1993: Lotto
- 1994–1995: Vlaanderen 2002-Eddy Merckx

Major wins
- 1 stage, Tour de France (1992)

Jan Nevens (born 26 August 1958) is a Belgian former professional road bicycle racer. Nevens won the 8th stage of the 1992 Tour de France. He also competed in the individual road race event at the 1980 Summer Olympics.

== Major results ==
1982
Nederbrakel
1985
Stage 1, Clásico RCN
Wavre
1986
Stage 6, Tour de Romandie
1987
Liedekerkse Pijl
1988
Overall, Tour Méditerranéen
Stage 6, Vuelta Asturias
1990
Mere
1991
Stage 4, Tour de Suisse
Stage 2, Giro del Trentino
1992
Stage 8, Tour de France
Geraardsbergen
1994
Wavre
