= Giancarlo Perini =

Italian cyclist

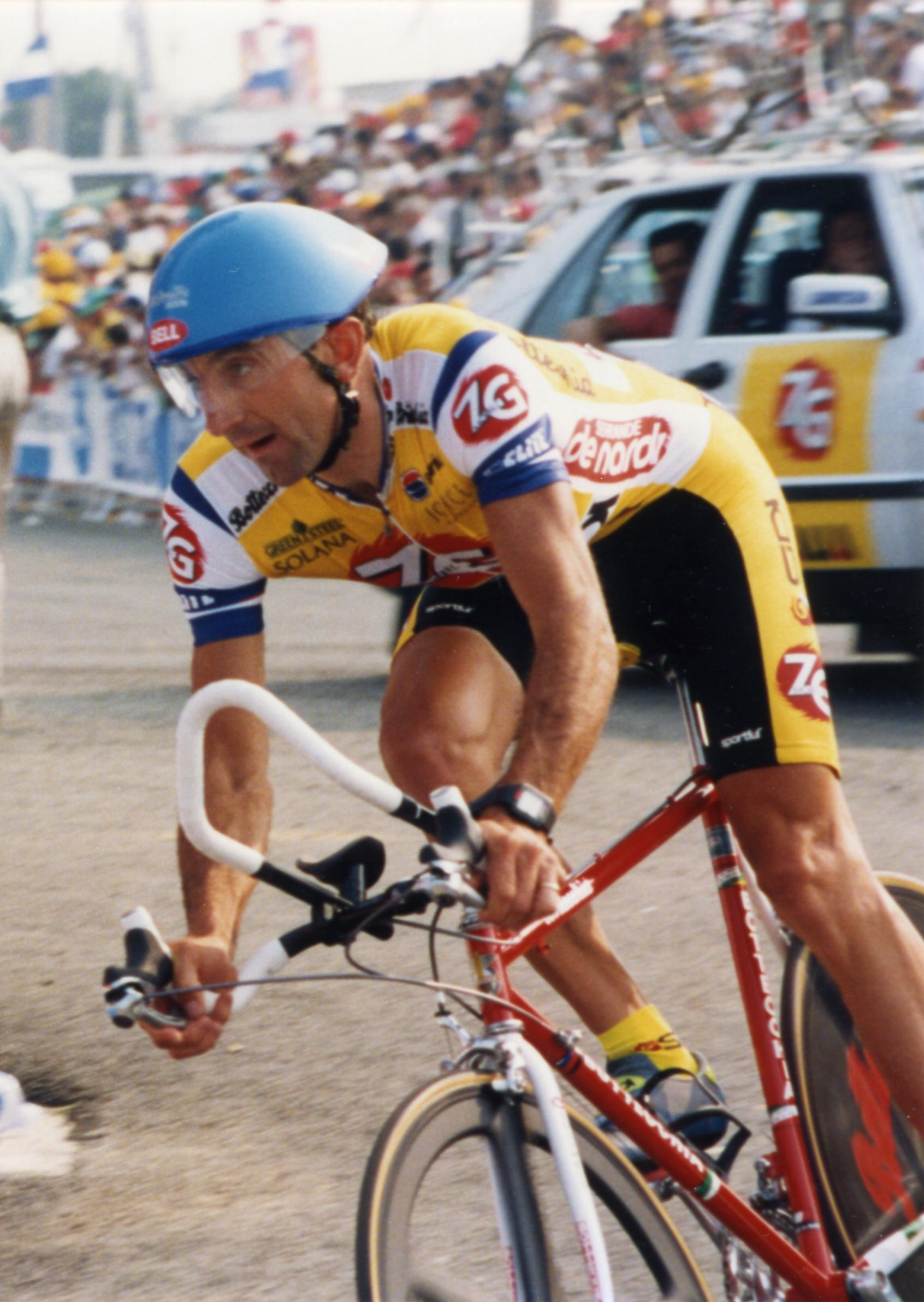

Personal information
- Born: 2 December 1959 (age 66) Carpaneto Piacentino

Cycling career
- Sport: Cycling
- Current team: Retired
- Discipline: Road
- Role: Rider

Professional teams
- 1981-83: Inoxpran
- 1984-1992: Carrera Jeans-Vagabond
- 1993-1994: ZG Mobili
- 1995: Brescialat
- 1996: San Marco Group

Giancarlo Perini (born 2 December 1959 in Carpaneto Piacentino) is a former Italian cyclist.

== Major results ==
1979
Gran Premio Industria e Commercio Artigianato Carnaghese
1987
2nd stage Tour de France (TTT)
1992
2nd Coppa Bernocchi
8th Tour de France
1993
3rd stage Giro di Puglia
2nd Gran Premio Città di Camaiore

== Grand Tour Results ==
=== Tour de France ===
- 1984: 81st
- 1985: 105th
- 1987: 102nd
- 1989: 102nd
- 1990: 99th
- 1991: 120th
- 1992: 8th
- 1993: 29th
- 1994: 54th
- 1995: 87th

=== Vuelta a España ===
- 1981: 45th

=== Giro d'Italia ===
- 1984: DNF
- 1985: 73rd
- 1989: 56th
- 1990: 36th
- 1991: 85th
- 1992: 42nd
- 1993: 76th
- 1994: 57th
- 1995: 63rd
